= List of Manchester United F.C. players (1–24 appearances) =

Manchester United players with less than 25 appearances

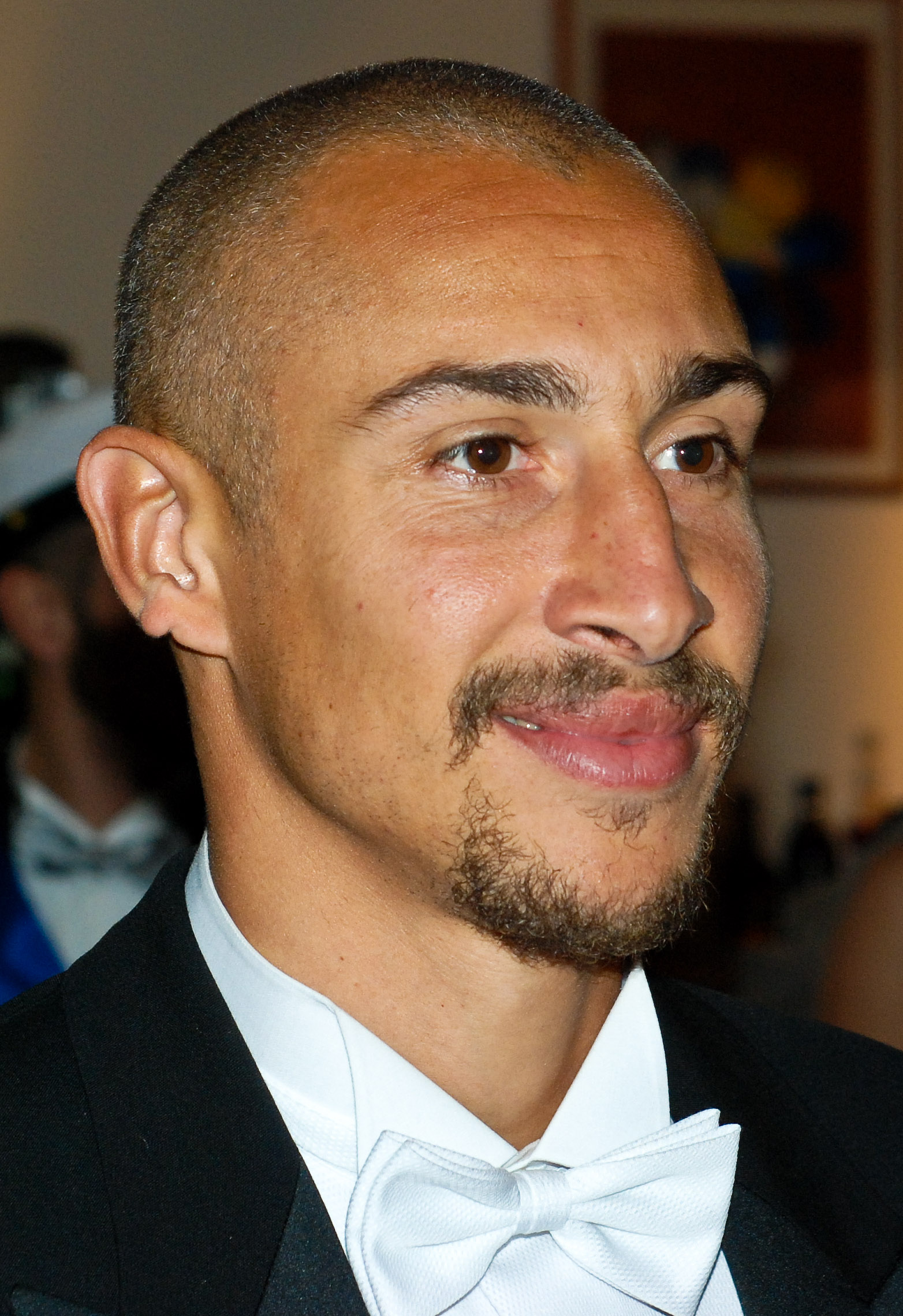
Henrik Larsson made 13 appearances in the Manchester United's title-winning 2006–07 season after being loaned to the club from Helsingborgs IF.

Manchester United Football Club is an English association football club based in Old Trafford, Greater Manchester. The club was formed in Newton Heath in 1878 as Newton Heath LYR F.C., and played their first competitive match in October 1886, when they entered the First Round of the 1886–87 FA Cup. The club was renamed Manchester United F.C. in 1902, and they moved to Old Trafford in 1910. The club won its first significant trophy in 1908, the First Division title. Since then, the club has won a further 19 league titles, along with 13 FA Cups and six League Cups. They have also been crowned champions of European football on three occasions by winning the European Cup. The club was one of 22 teams in the Premier League when it was formed in 1992. They experienced the most successful period in their history under the management of Alex Ferguson, who guided the team to 13 league titles in 21 years.

Since Manchester United's first competitive match, 989 players have made a competitive first-team appearance for the club. Many of these players have spent only a short period of their career at Manchester United before seeking opportunities in other teams. Peter Beardsley played just one match for Manchester United, but went on to have a very successful career at Newcastle United, Liverpool, and several other clubs; he also won 59 caps for the England national team. Gerard Piqué made 23 appearances across four seasons with Manchester United before departing for FC Barcelona, his boyhood club. He went on to have a decorated career with Barcelona and the Spanish national team. Some players had their careers cut short by injury, while others left for other reasons. Jimmy Davis was killed in a car accident in 2003 having made one first-team appearance, the first Manchester United player to die during his career since the Munich air disaster, which claimed the lives of many of the Busby Babes, including Geoff Bent. The First and Second World Wars also disrupted the careers of footballers across the United Kingdom. A handful of players, including Henrik Larsson, Odion Ighalo, Marcel Sabitzer, and Sergio Reguilón, spent only a short time at Manchester United on loan deals.

As of 11 October 2026, a total of 500 players have played fewer than 25 competitive matches for the club. Four former players — John Scott, Ted Buckle, Eddie Lewis, and Michael Clegg — each made 24 appearances during their time at Manchester United.

The most recent players to make their debuts for the club is Cameroonian midfielder Carlos Baleba, who came on as a substitute the 2026–27 Premier League match against Tottenham Hotspur. The current player closest to making his 25th appearance for the club is Turkish goalkeeper Altay Bayındır, who has made 17 appearances for Manchester United.

== List of players ==
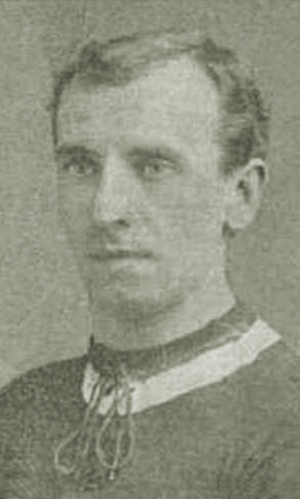
John Christie made one appearance for Manchester United.

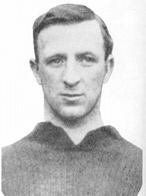
Tom Chorlton made four appearances for Manchester United.

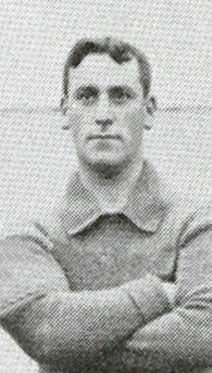
Walter Whittaker made three appearances for Manchester United.

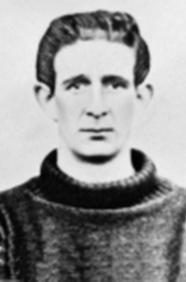
Harry Williams made five appearances for Manchester United.

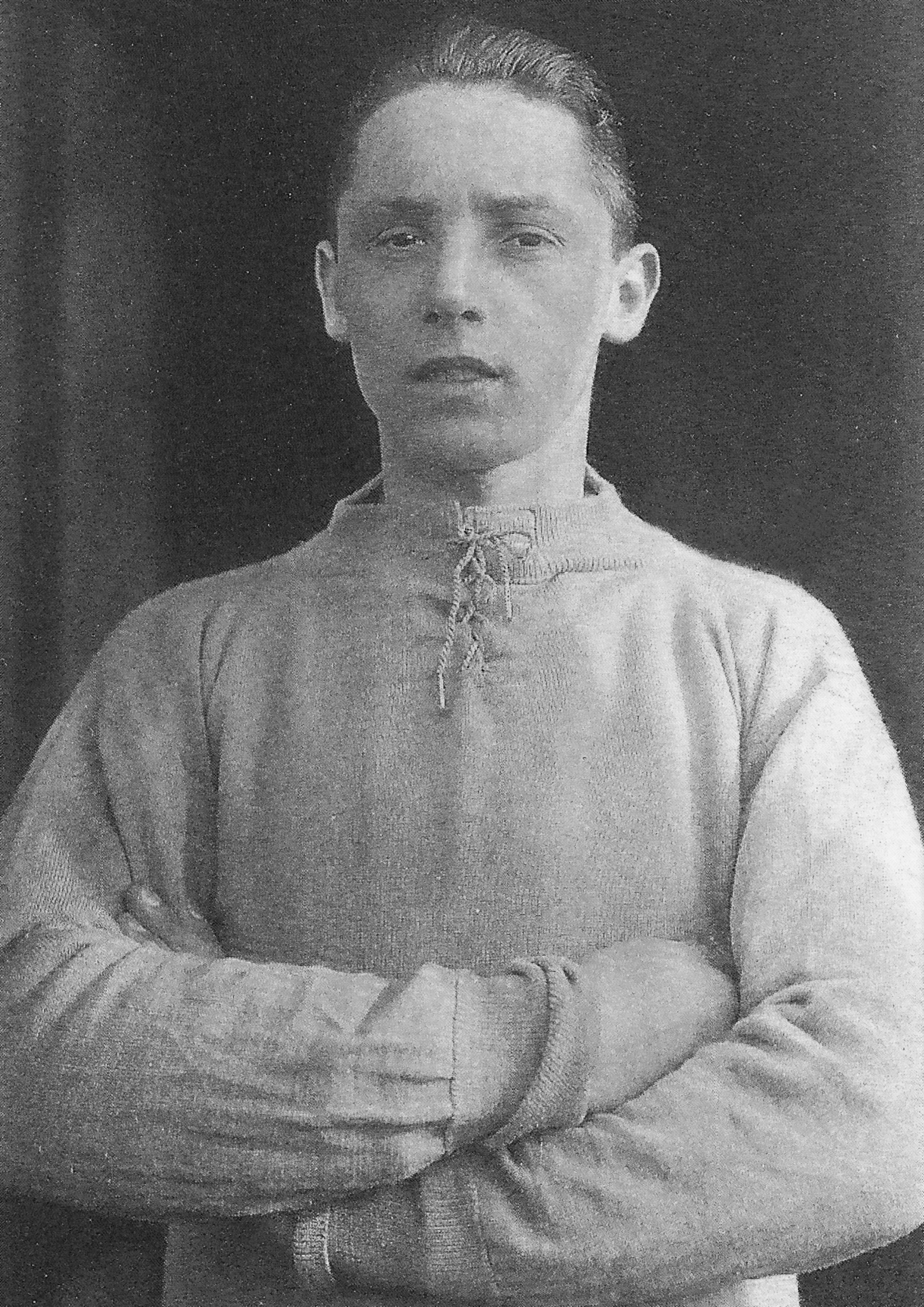
Tommy Jones made 22 appearances for Manchester United.

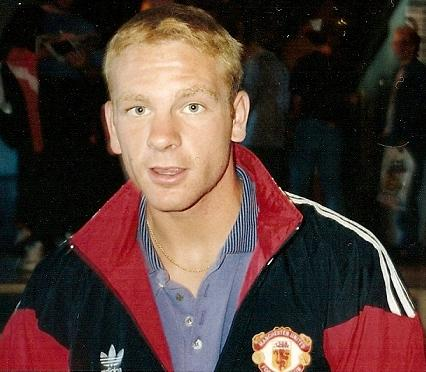
Neil Whitworth made one appearance for Manchester United.

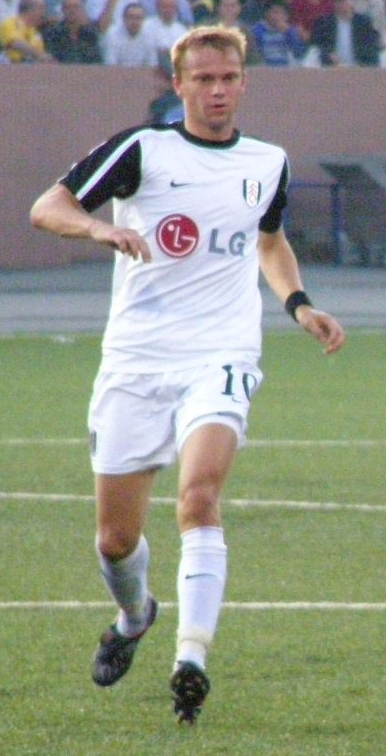
Erik Nevland made five appearances for Manchester United.

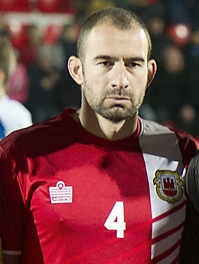
Danny Higginbotham made seven appearances for Manchester United.

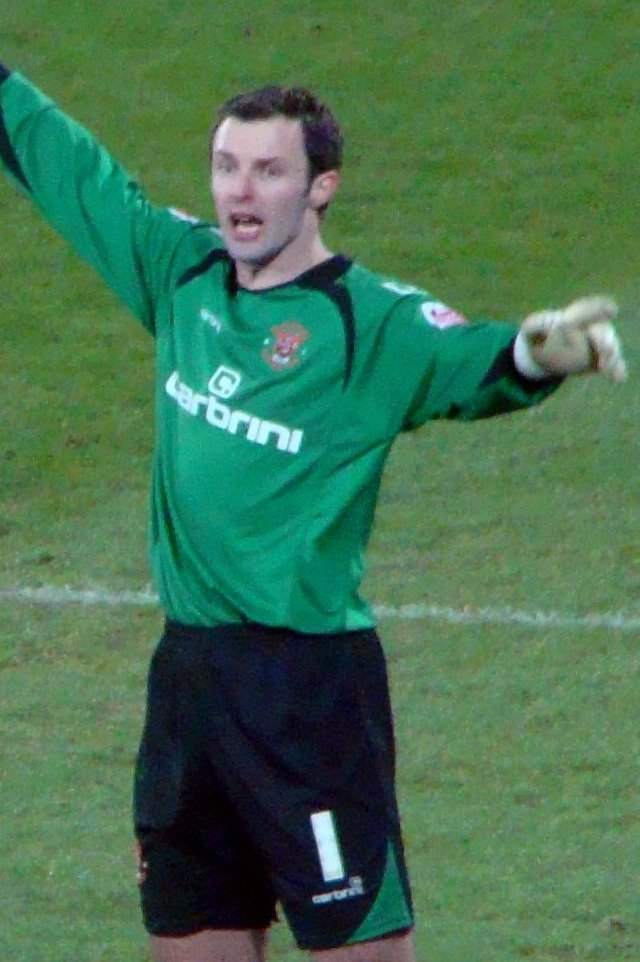
Paul Rachubka made three appearances for Manchester United.

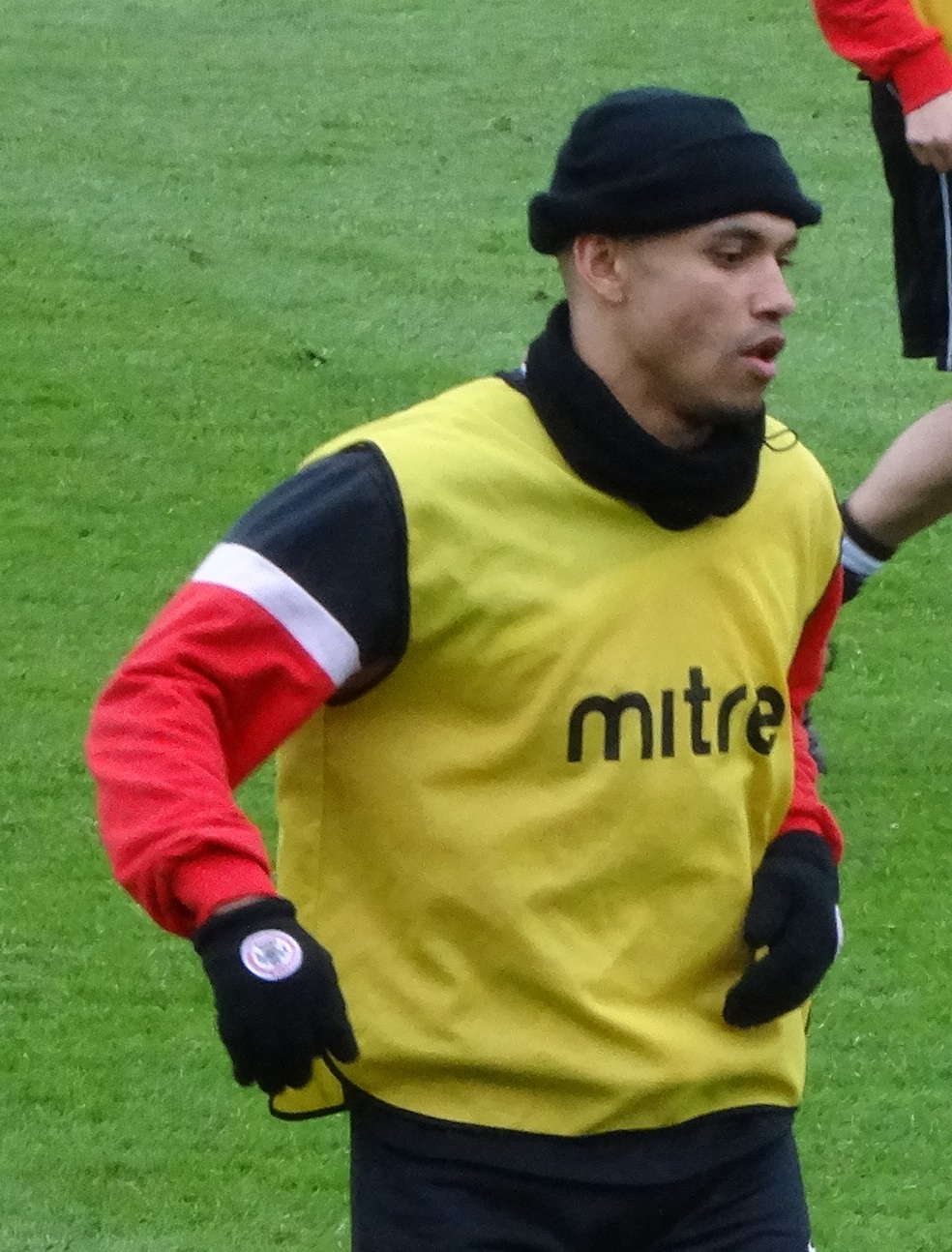
Danny Webber made three appearances for Manchester United.

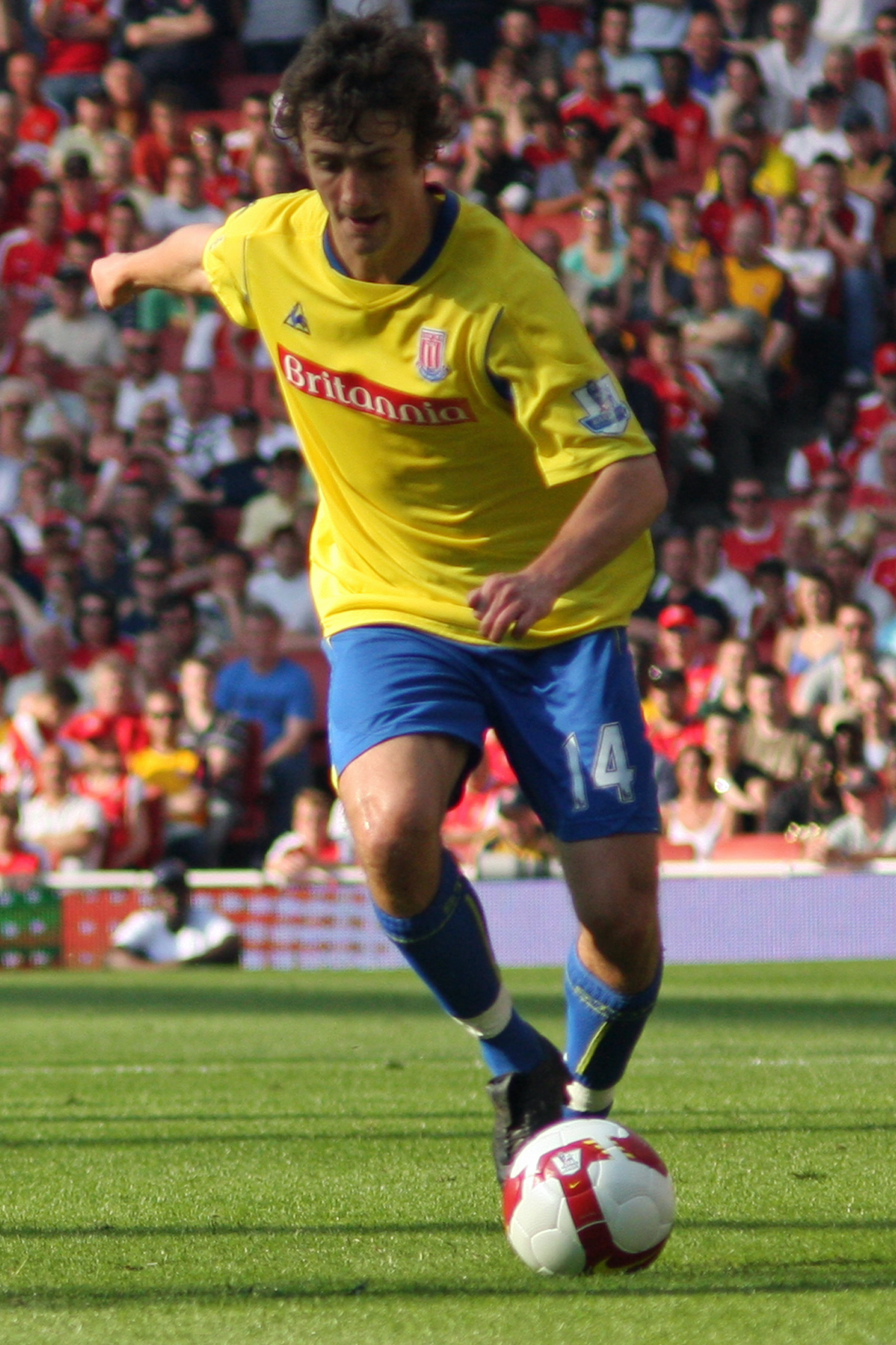
Danny Pugh made seven appearances for Manchester United.

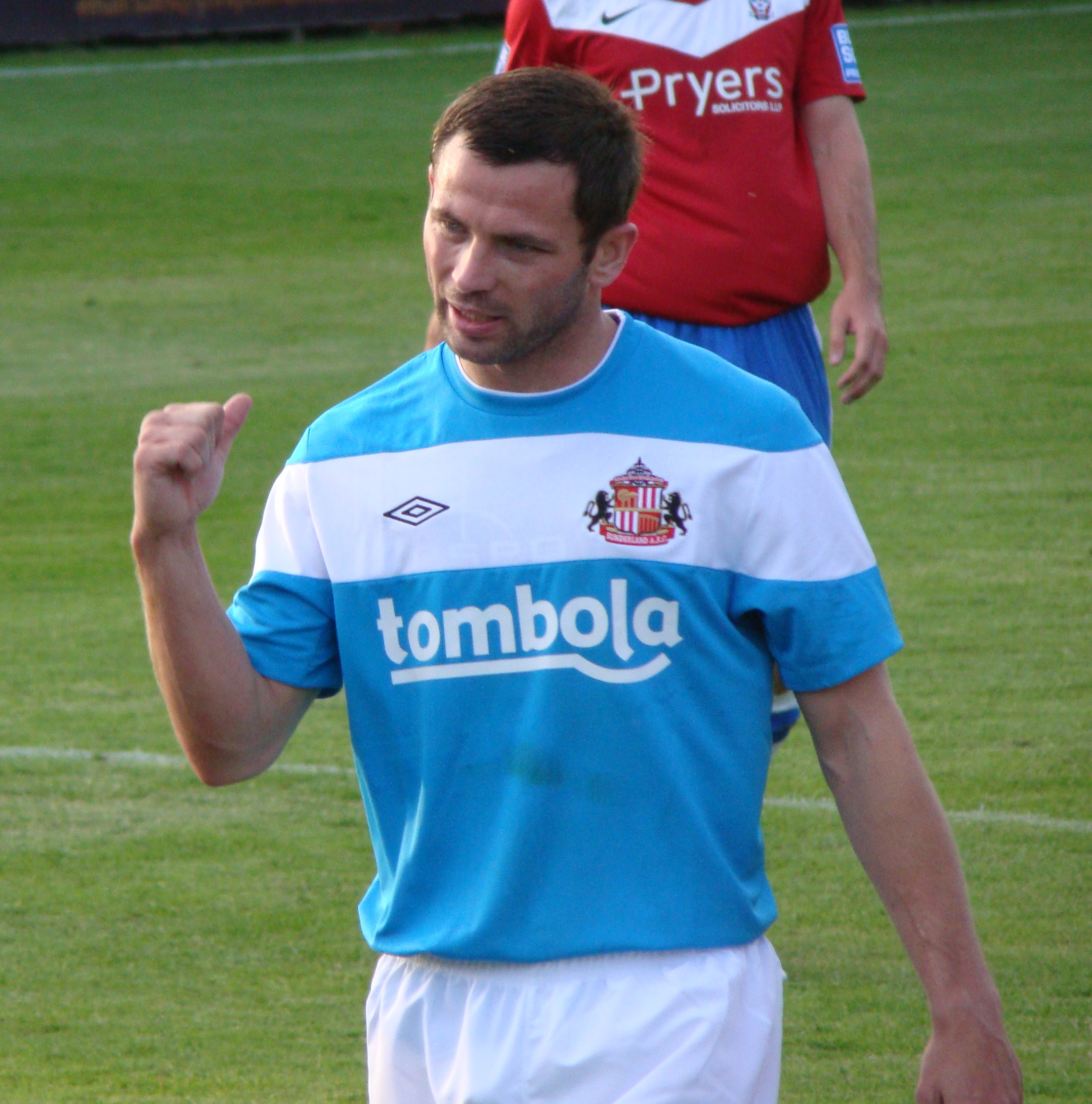
Phil Bardsley made 18 appearances for Manchester United.

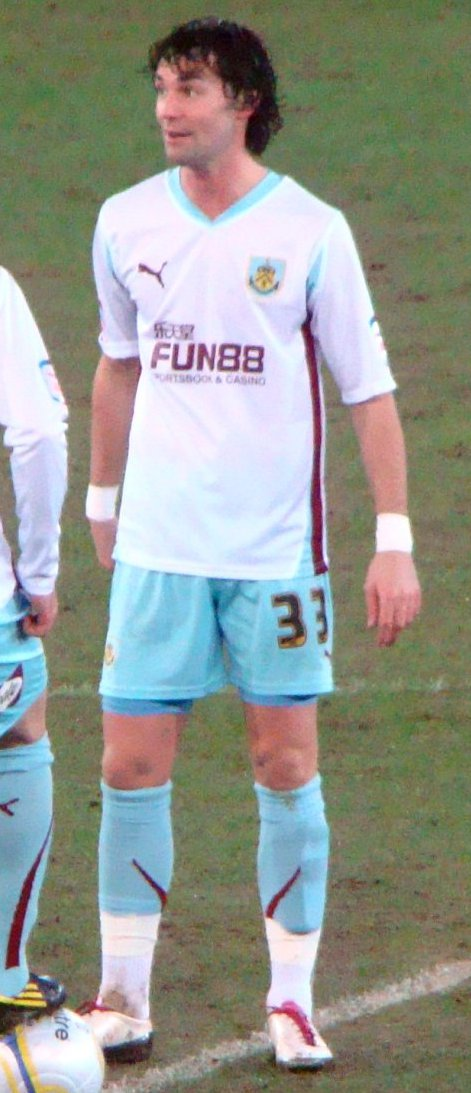
Chris Eagles made 17 appearances for Manchester United.

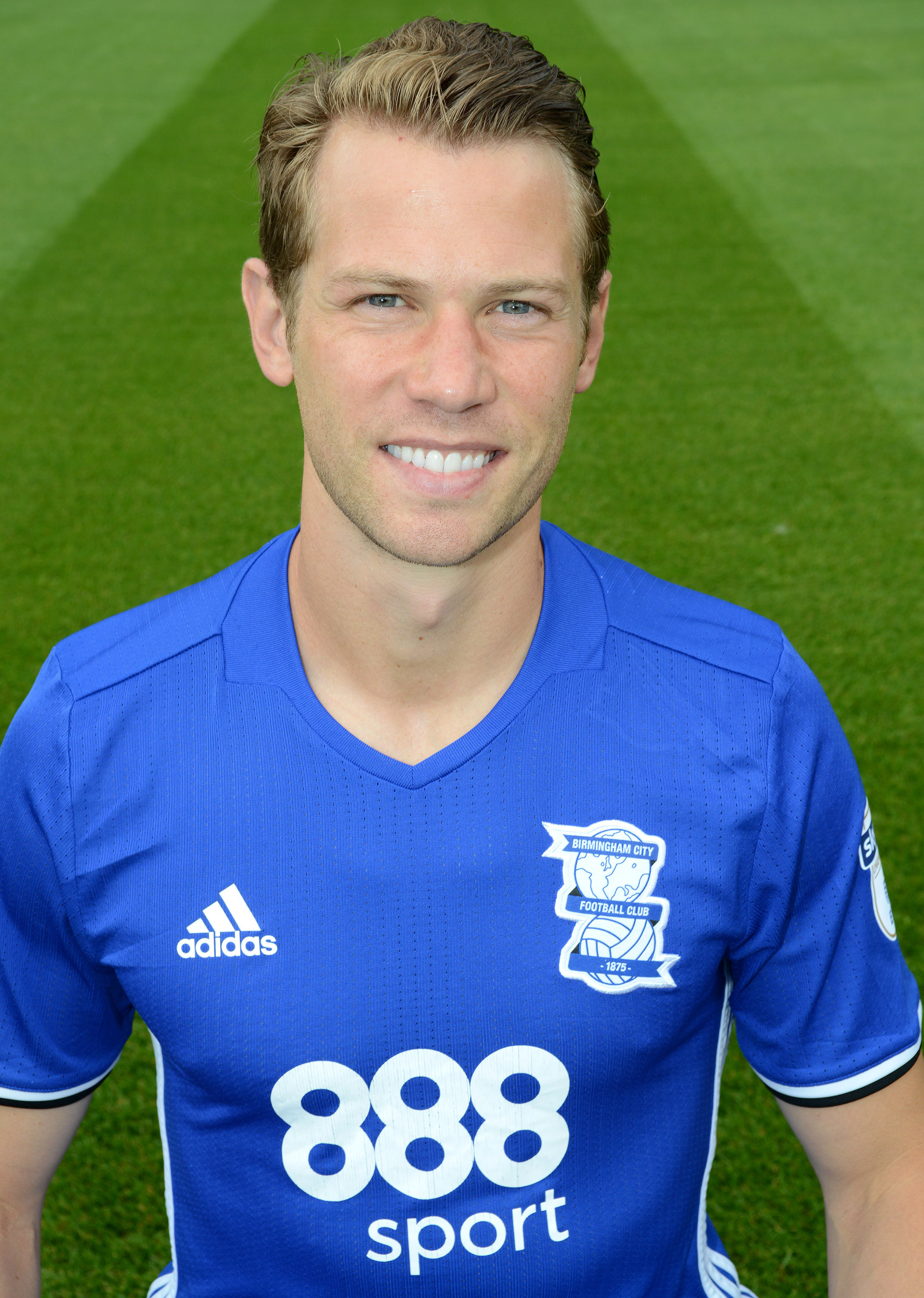
Jonathan Spector made eight appearances for Manchester United.

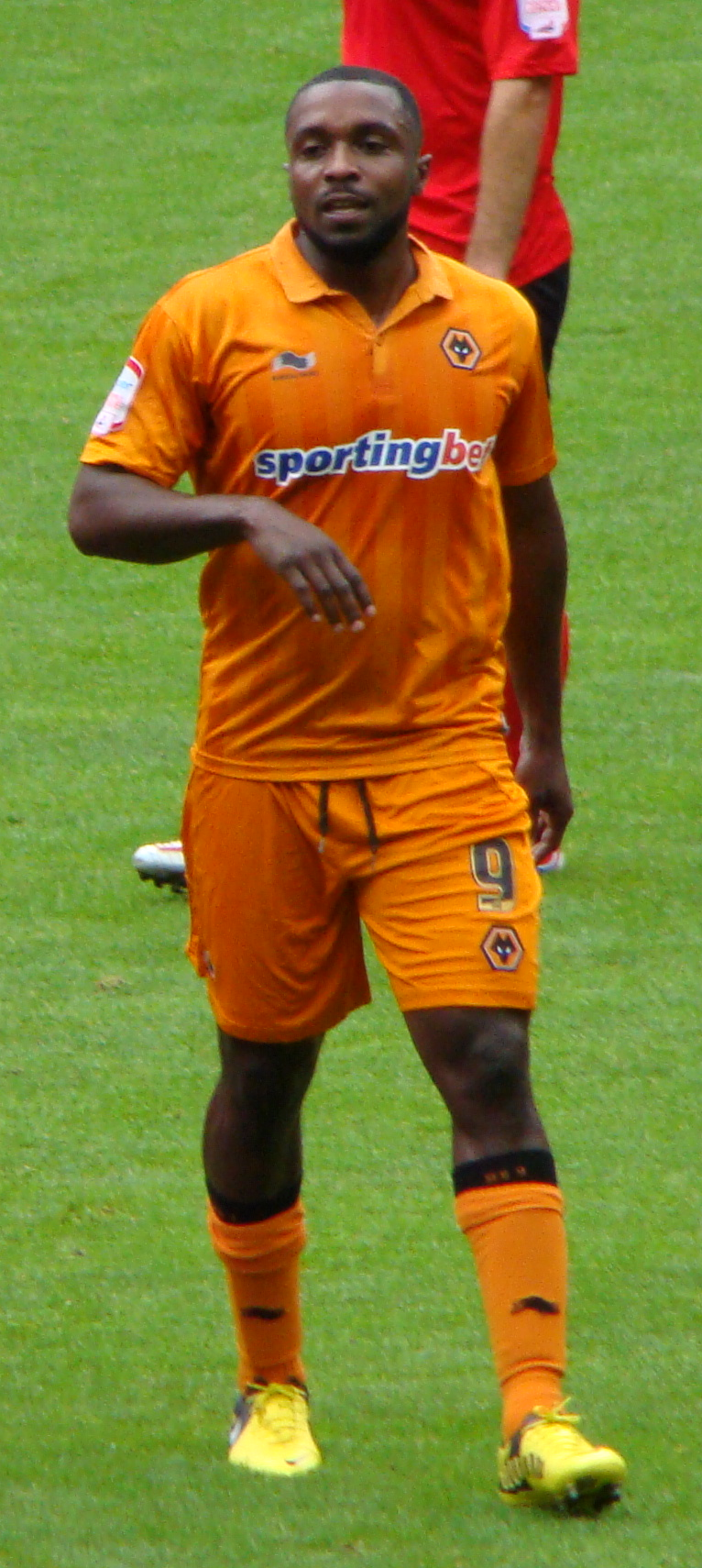
Sylvan Ebanks-Blake made two appearances for Manchester United.

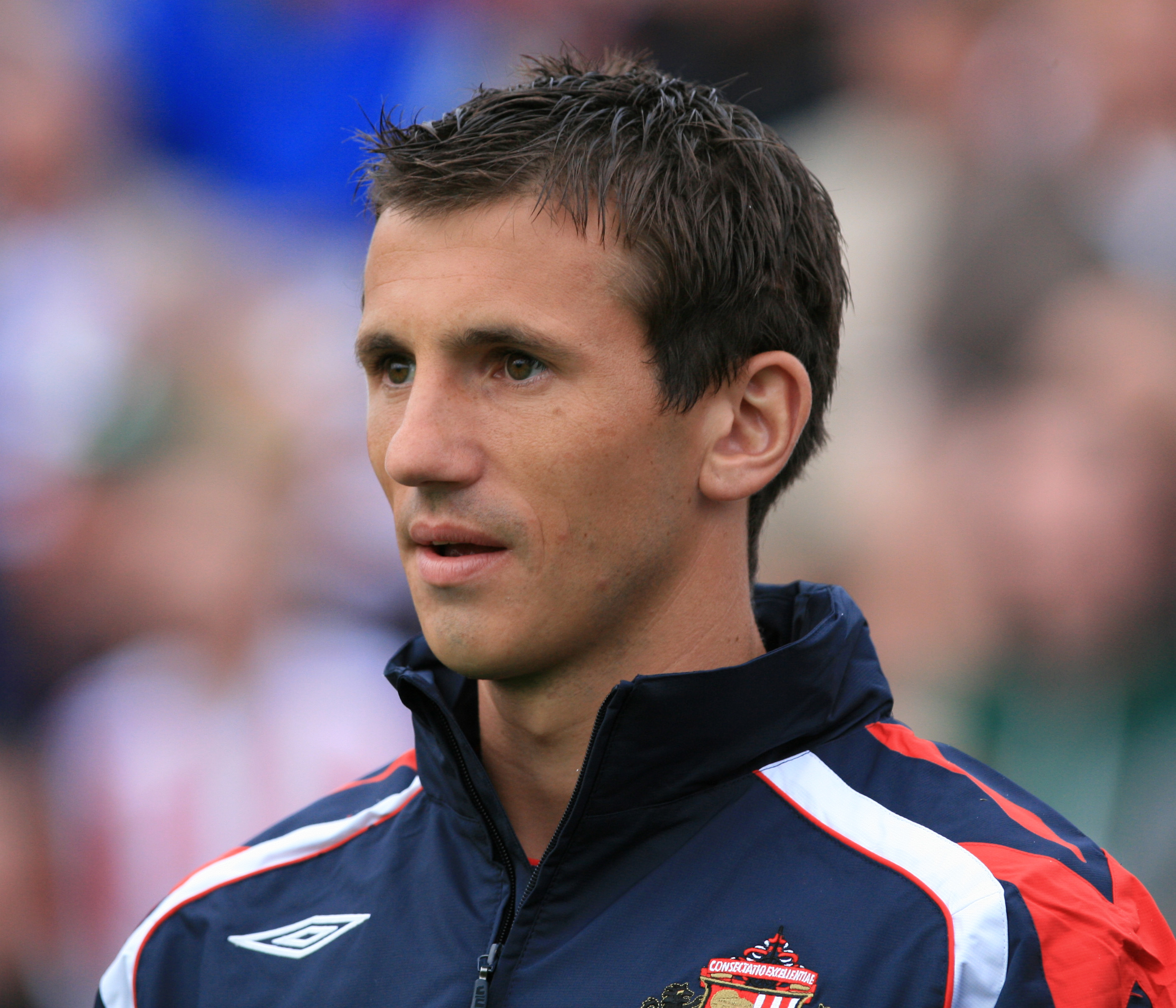
Liam Miller made 22 appearances for Manchester United.

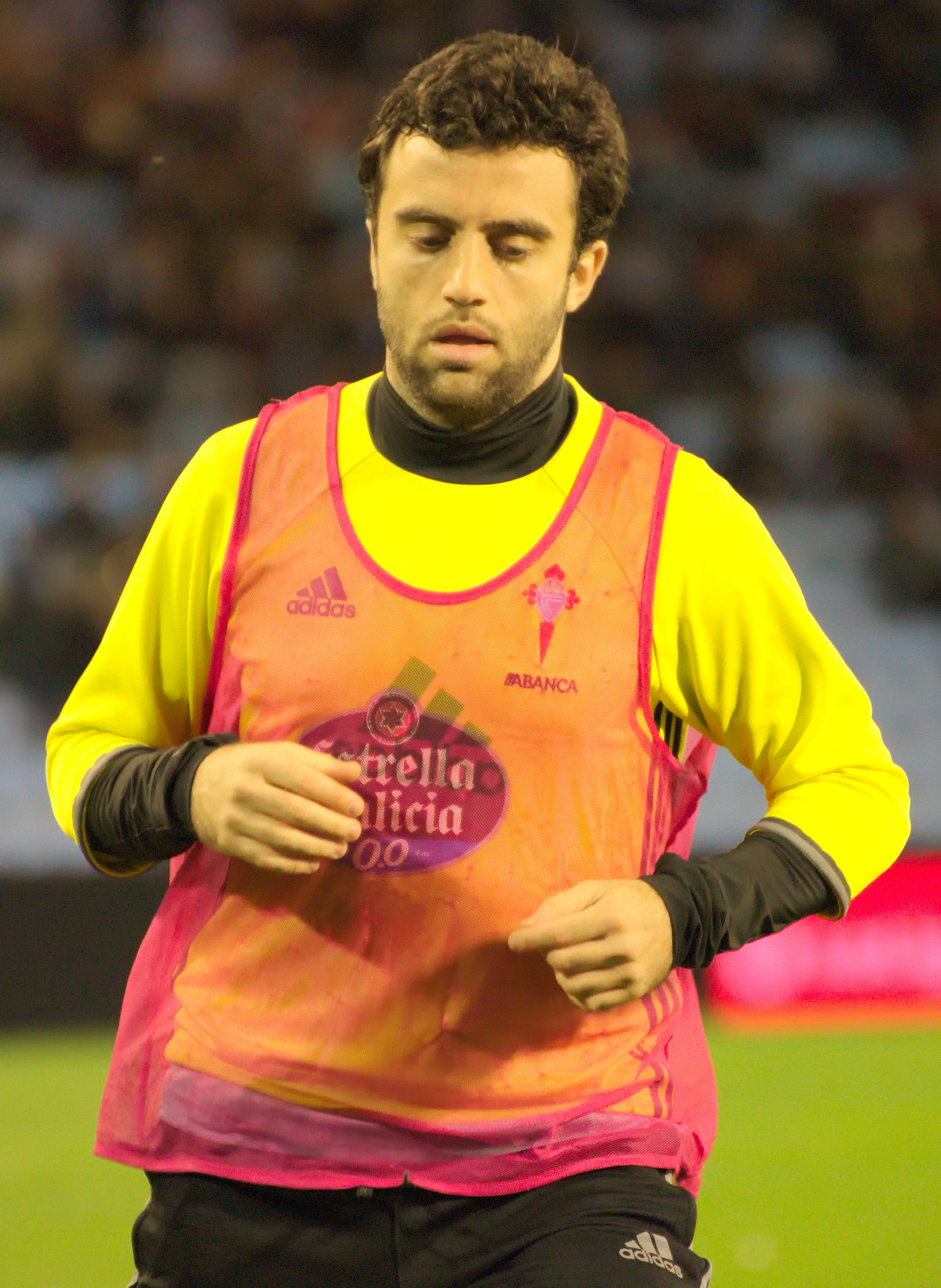
Giuseppe Rossi made 14 appearances for Manchester United.

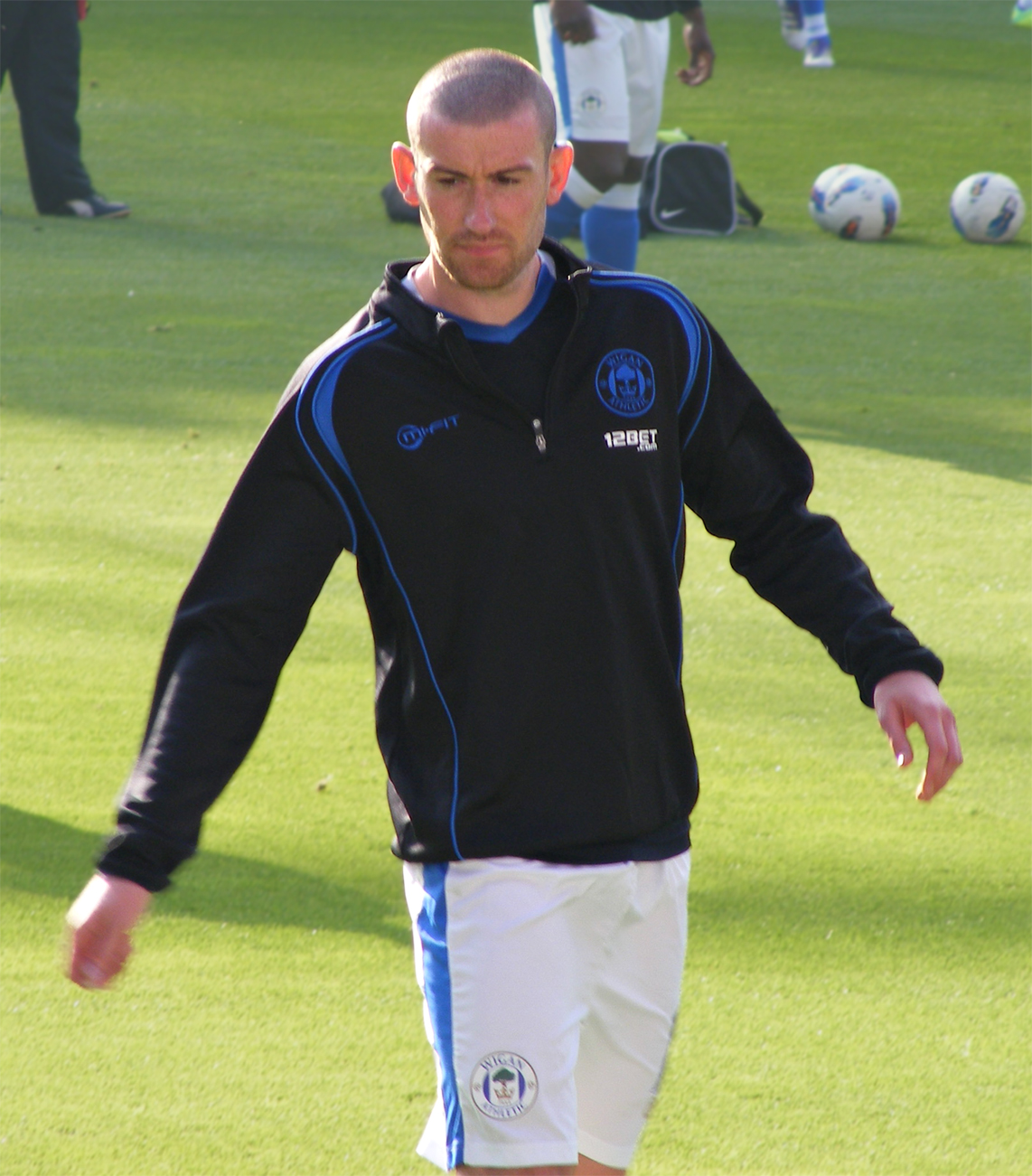
David Jones made four appearances for Manchester United.

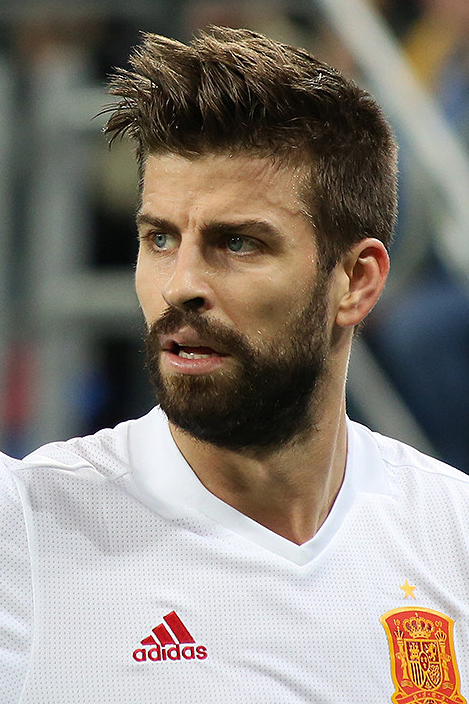
Gerard Piqué made 23 appearances for Manchester United and went on to have a decorated career with his boyhood club FC Barcelona and the Spain national team.

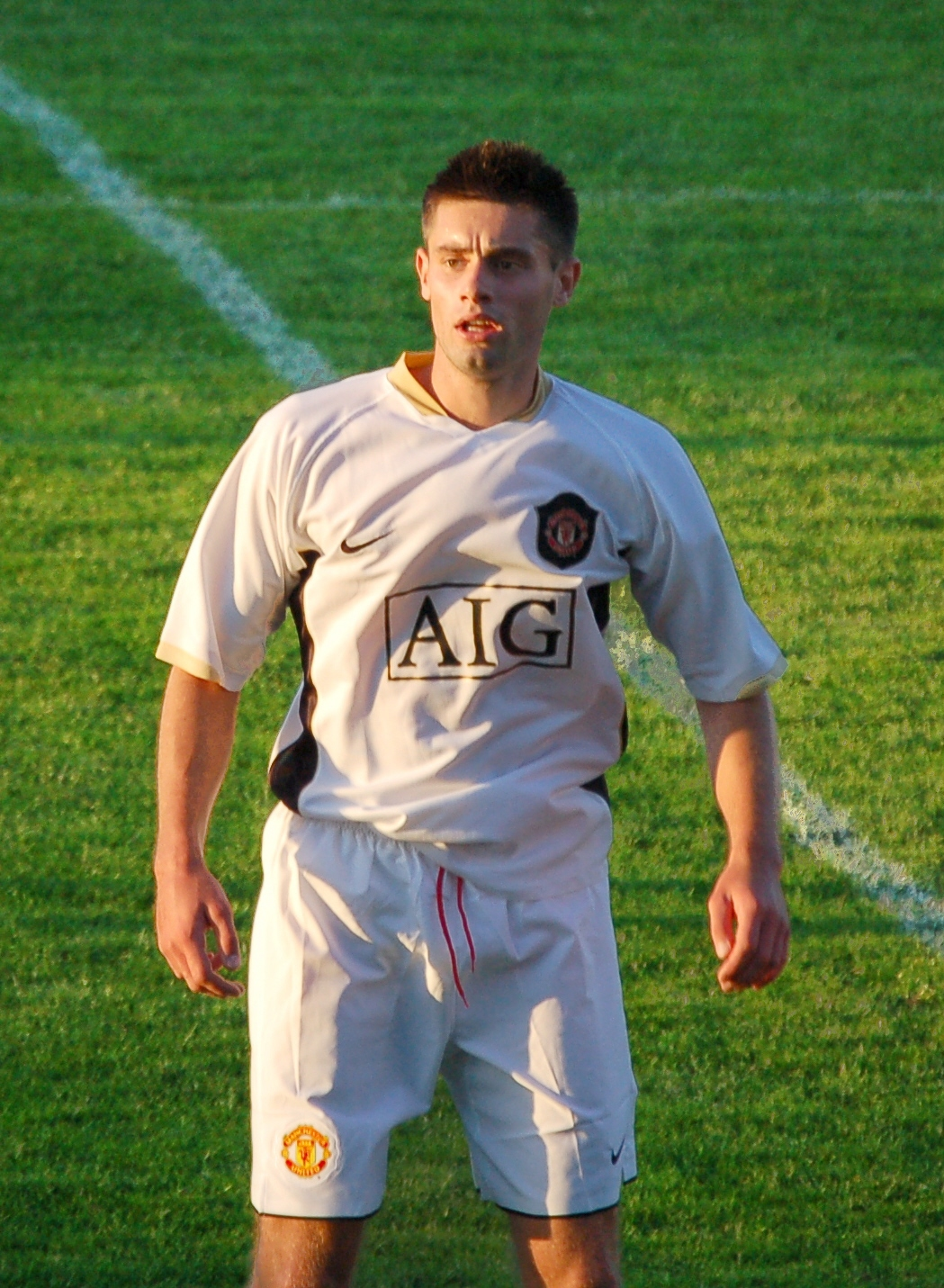
Ritchie Jones made five appearances for Manchester United.

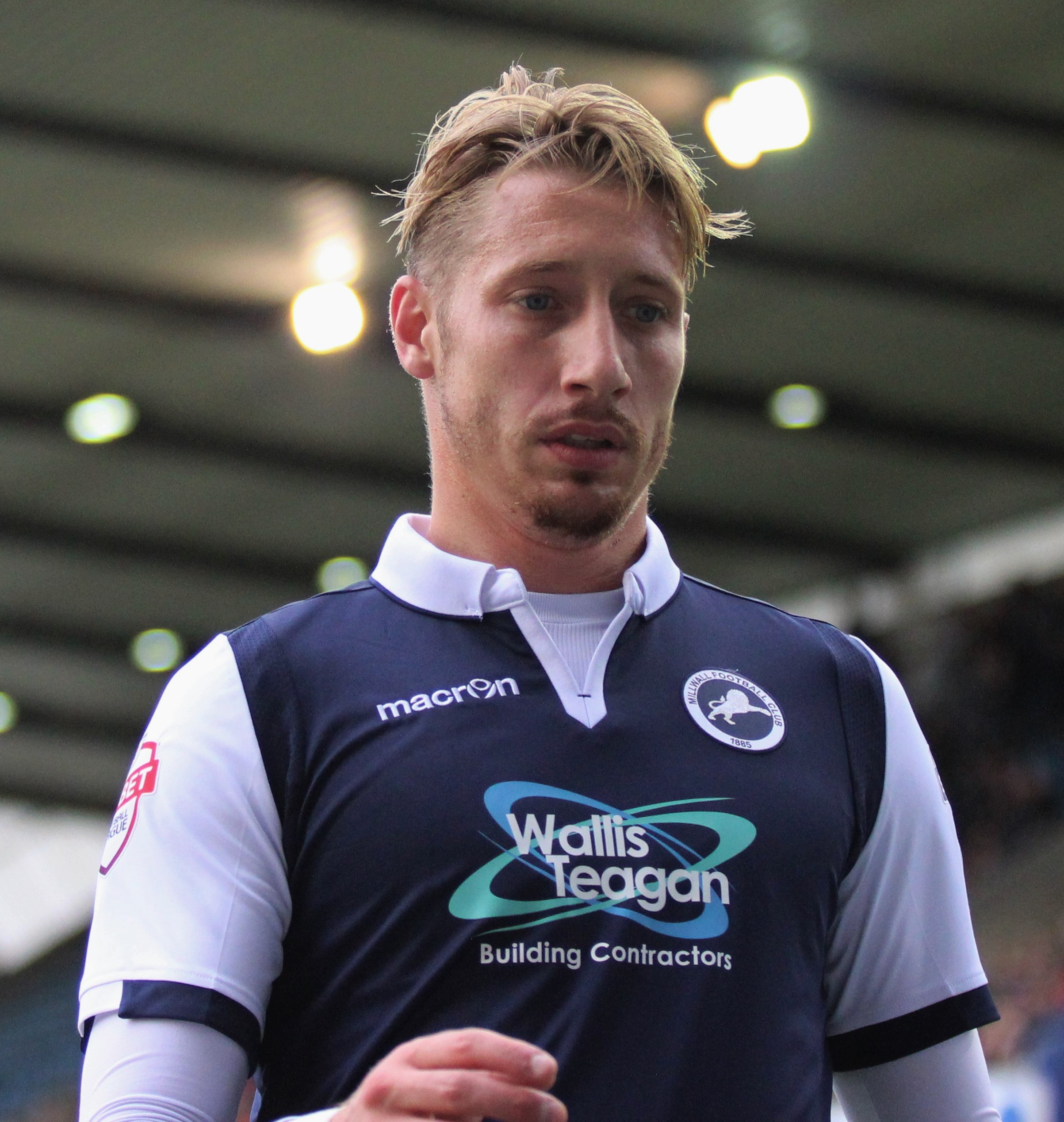
Lee Martin made three appearances for Manchester United.

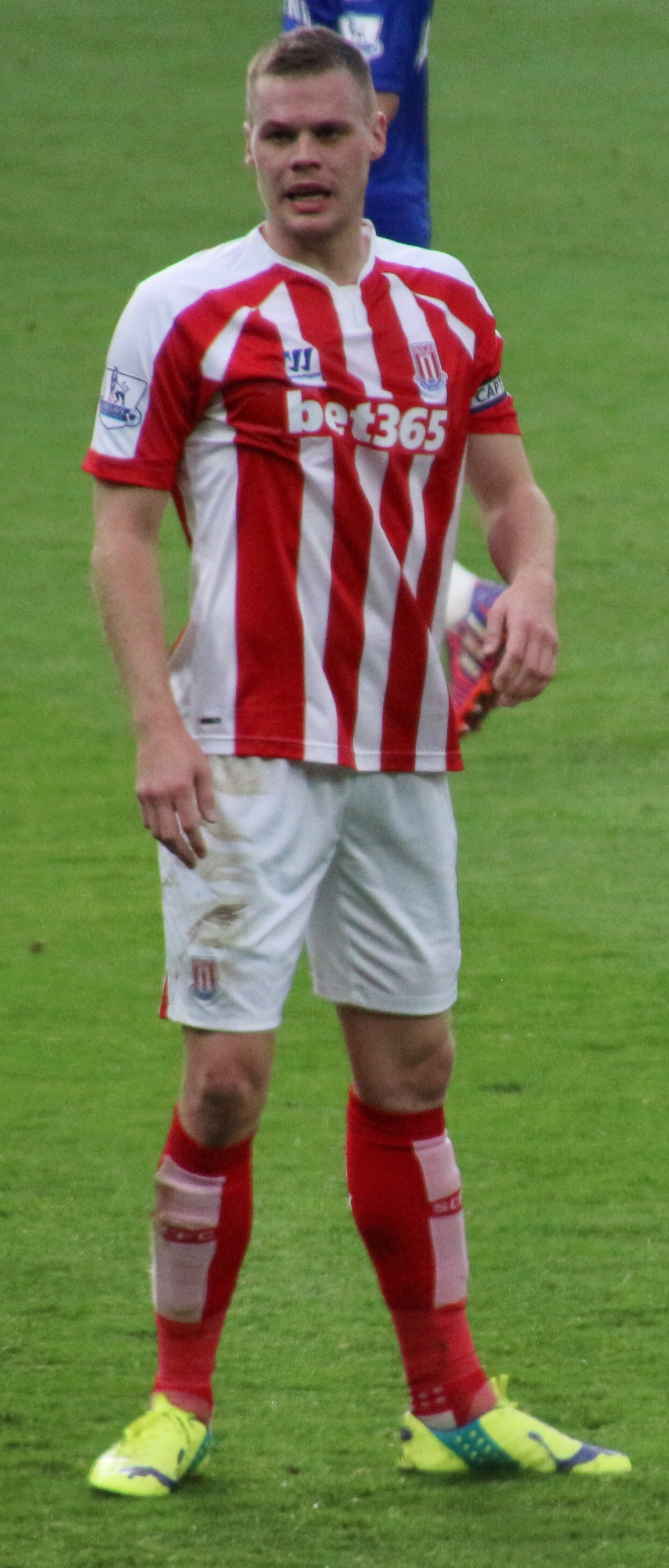
Ryan Shawcross made two appearances for Manchester United.

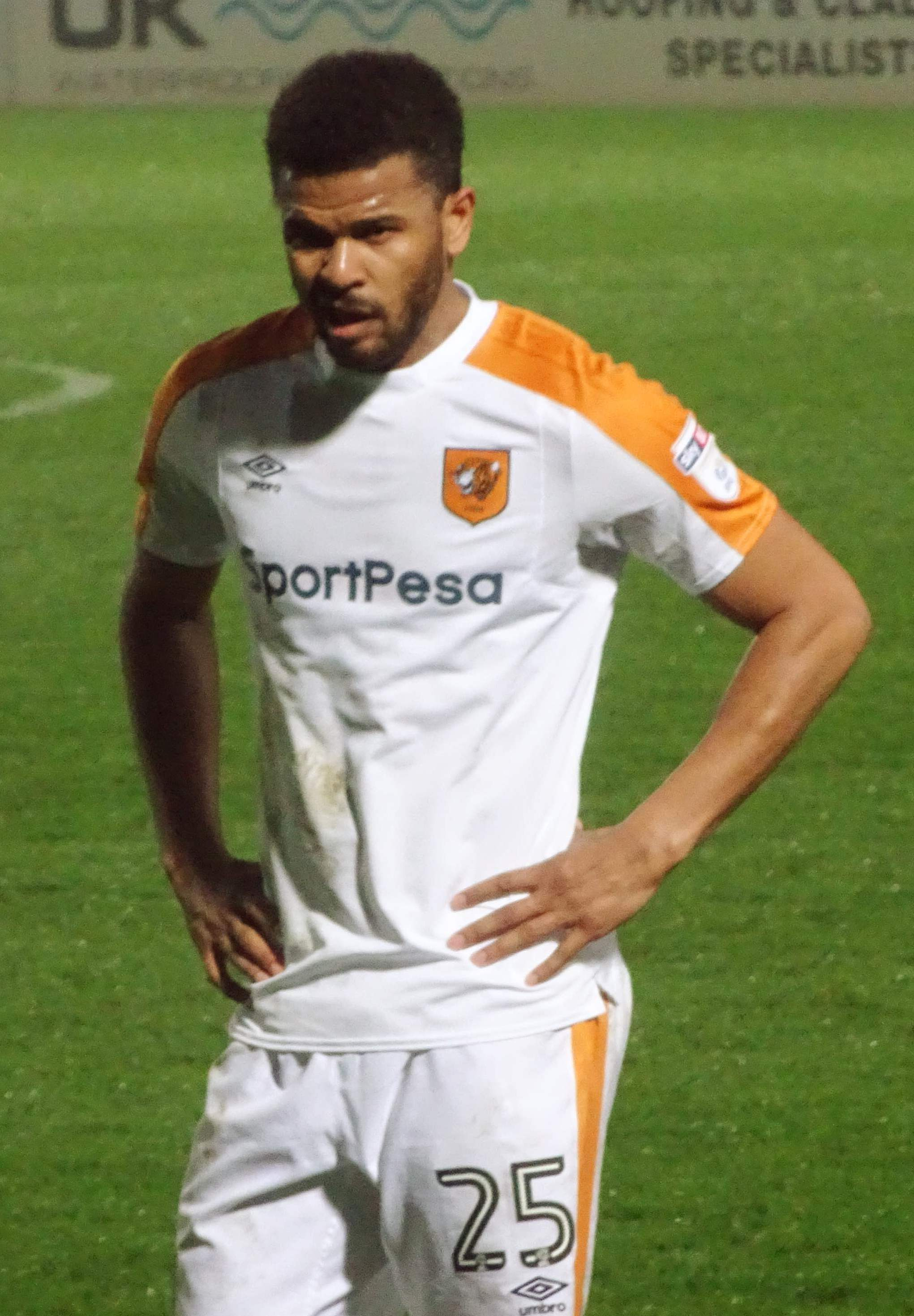
Fraizer Campbell made four appearances for Manchester United.

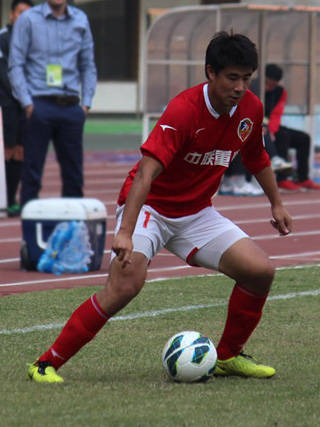
Dong Fangzhuo made three appearances for Manchester United.

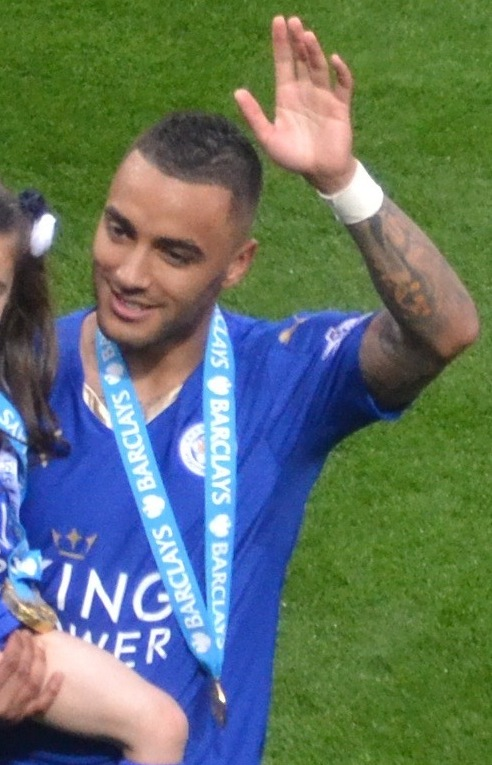
Danny Simpson made eight appearances for Manchester United.

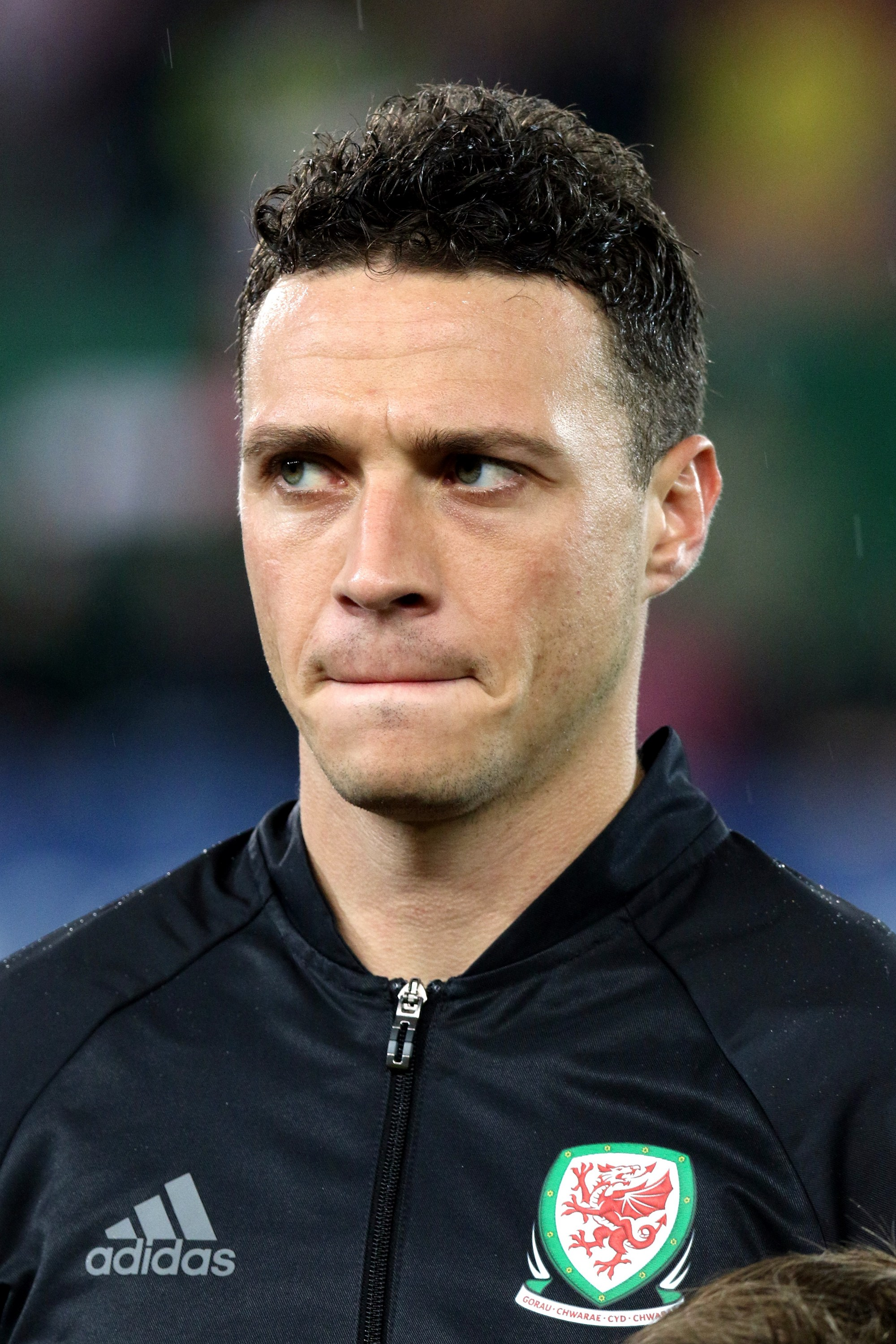
James Chester made one appearance for Manchester United.

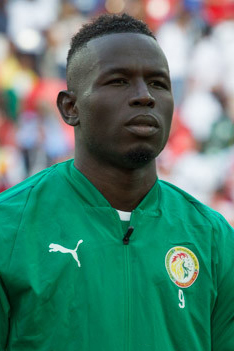
Mame Biram Diouf made eight appearances for Manchester United.

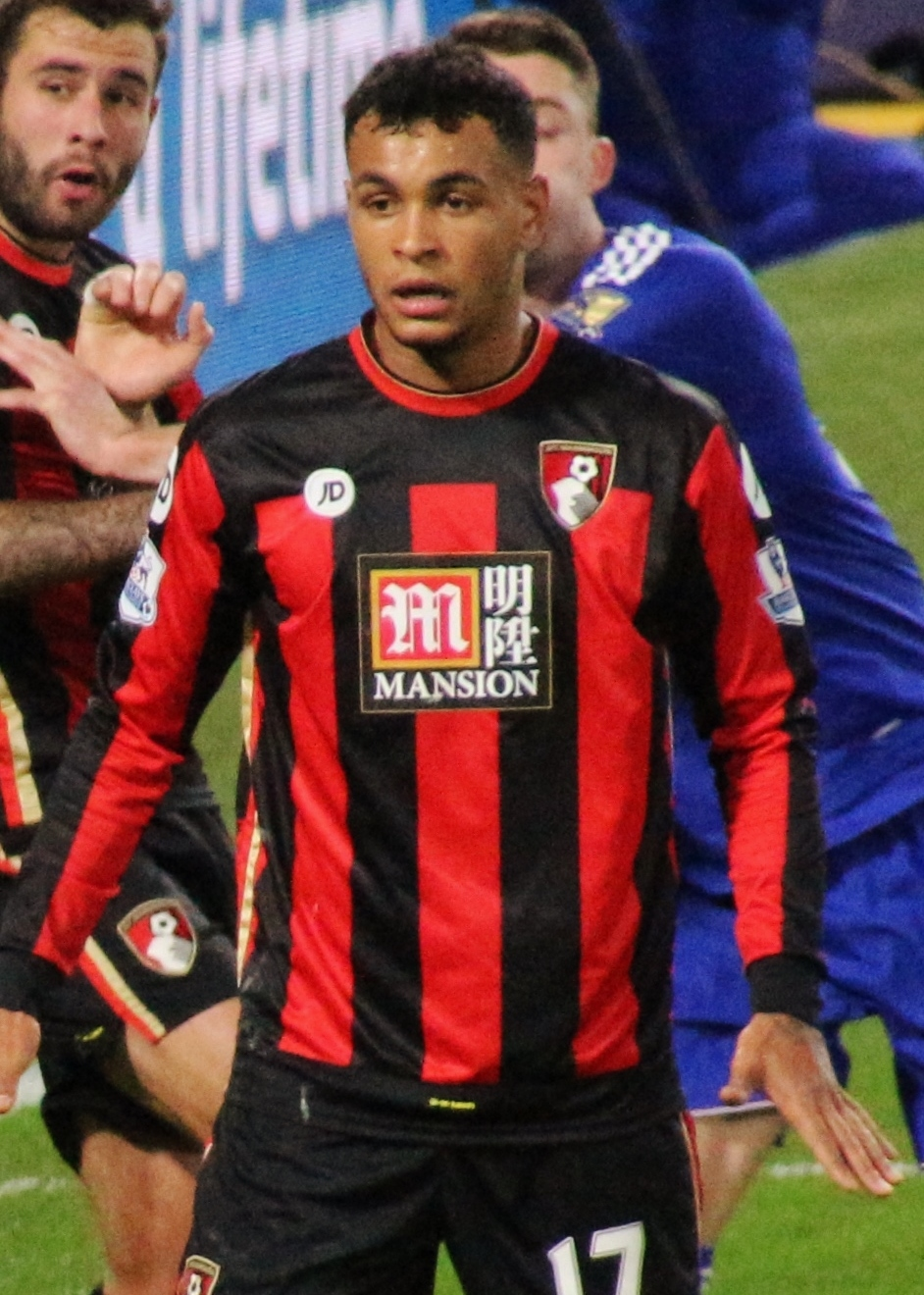
Joshua King made two appearances for Manchester United.

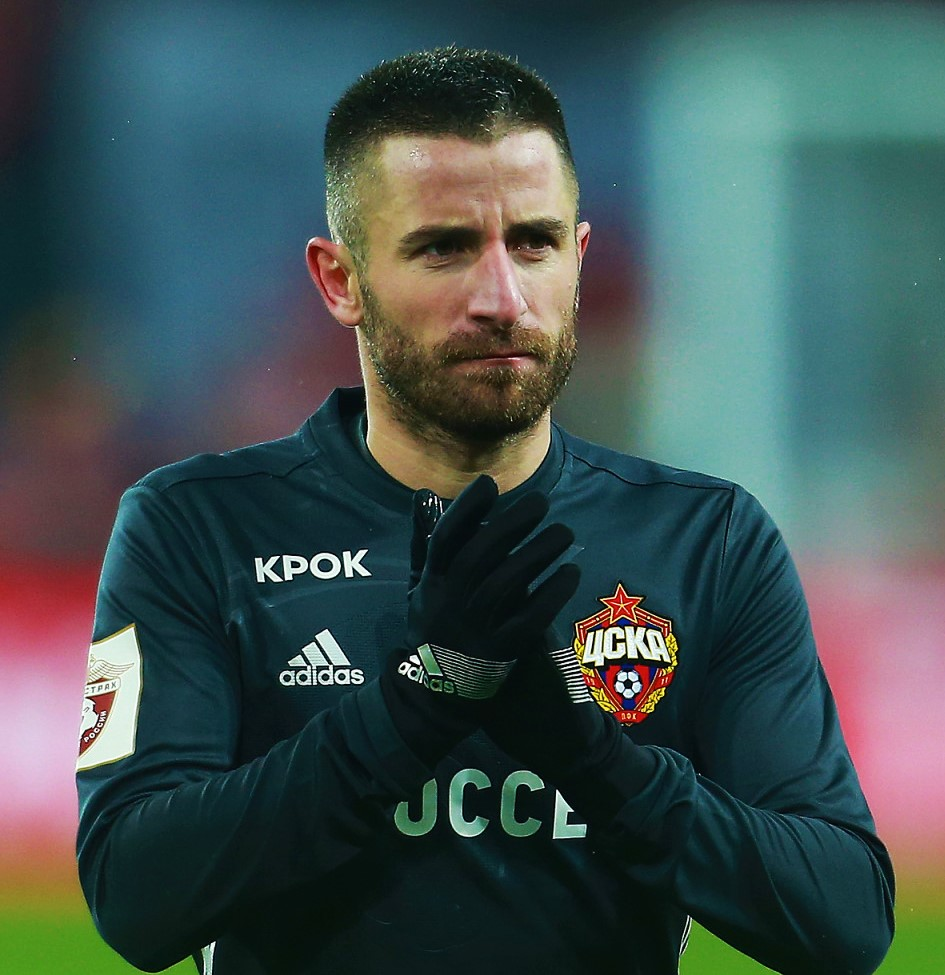
Zoran Tošić made five appearances for Manchester United.

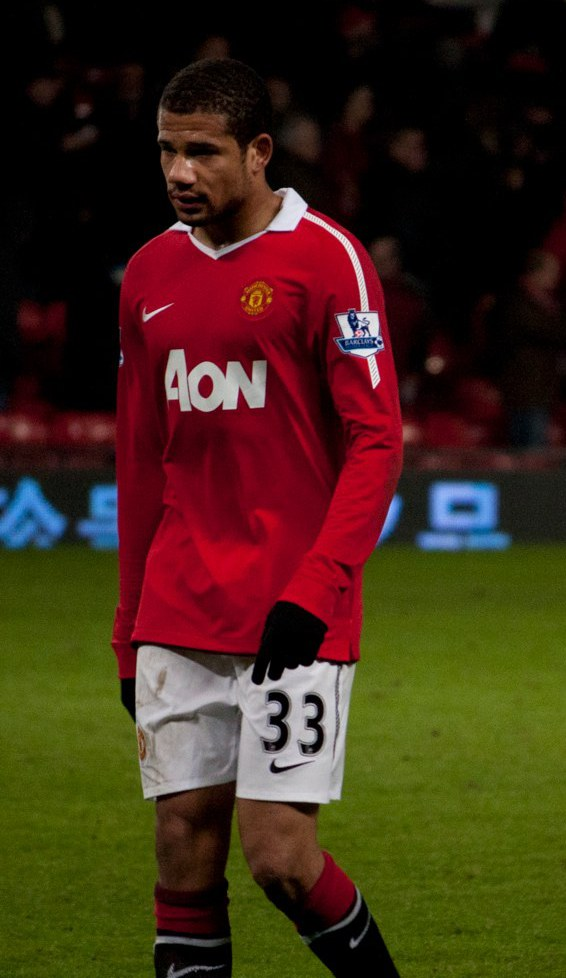
Bebé made seven appearances for Manchester United.

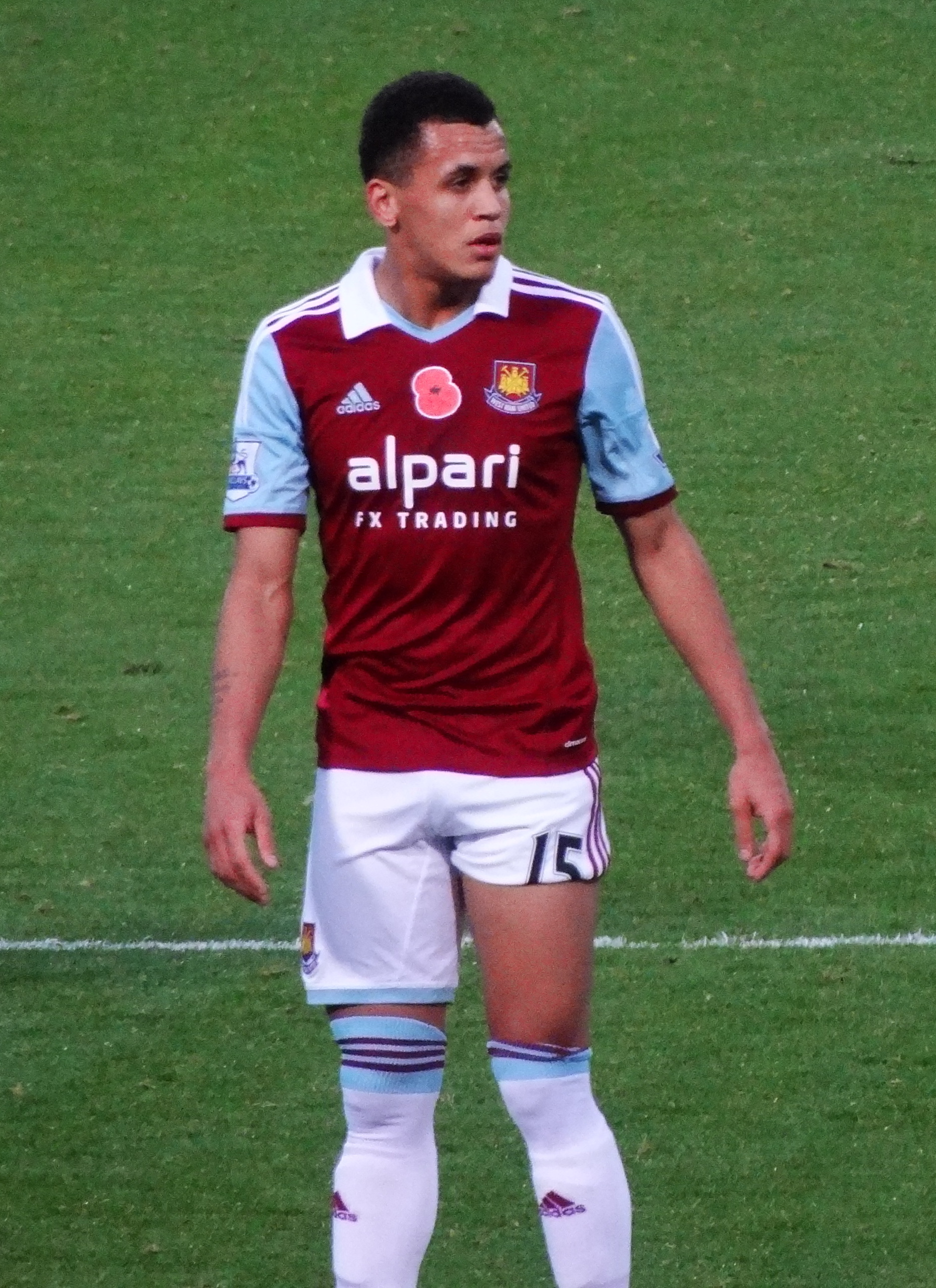
Ravel Morrison made two appearances for Manchester United.

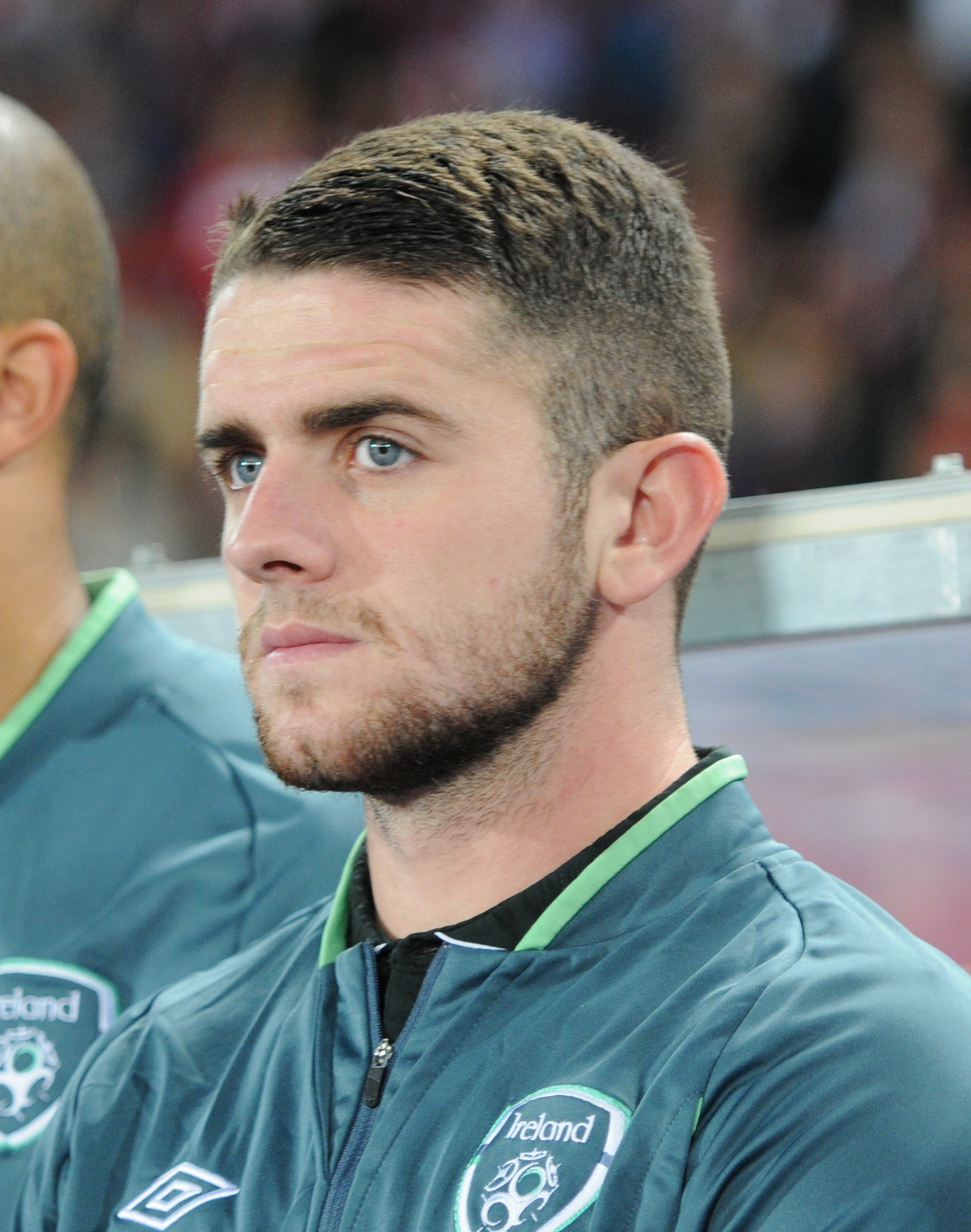
Robbie Brady made one appearance for Manchester United.

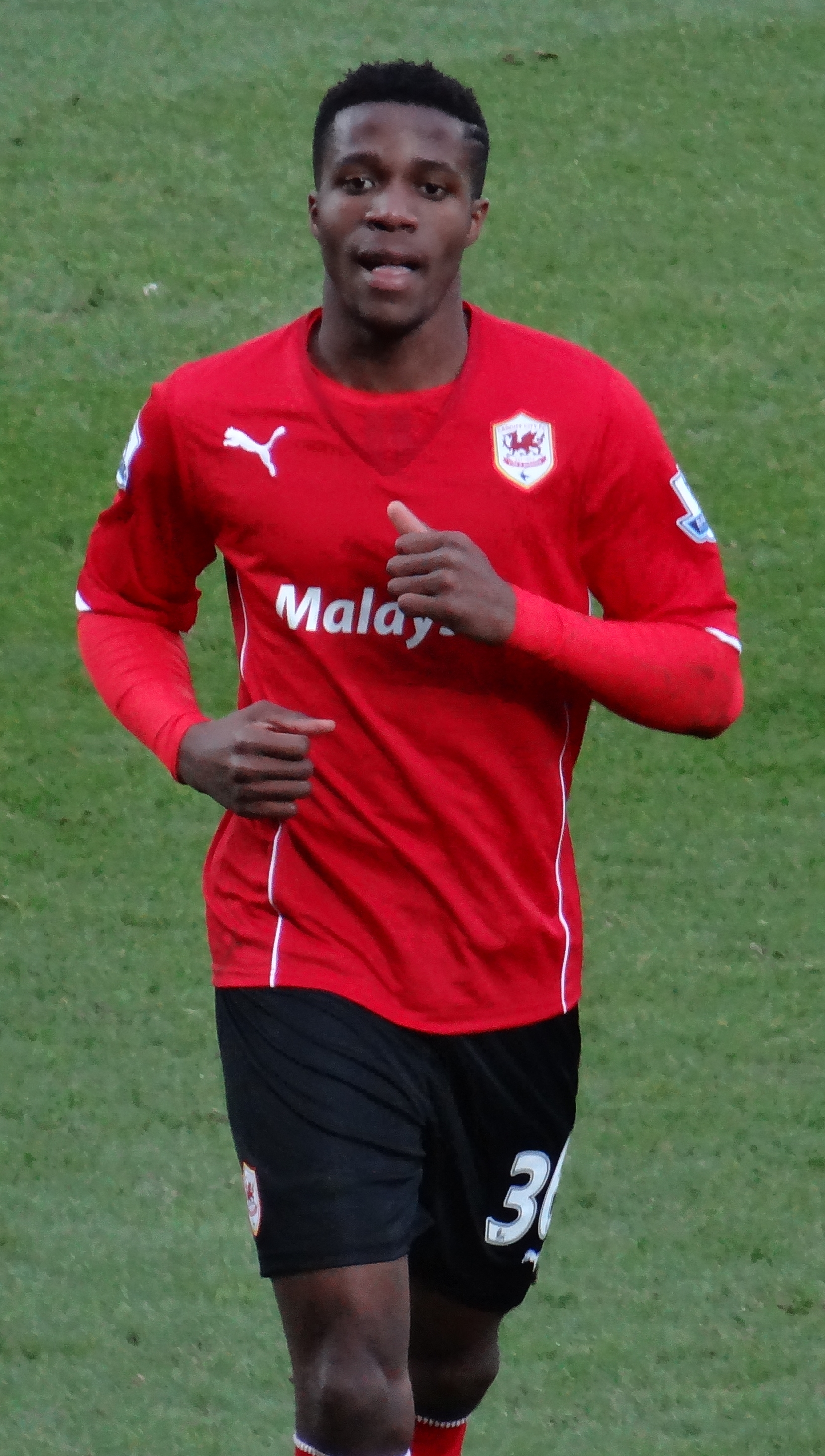
Wilfried Zaha made four appearances for Manchester United.

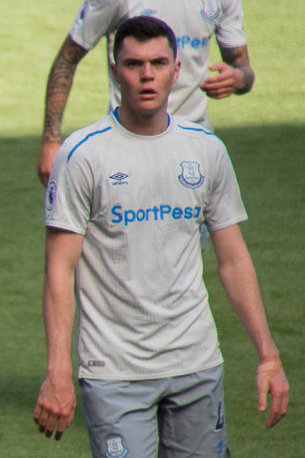
Michael Keane made five appearances for Manchester United.

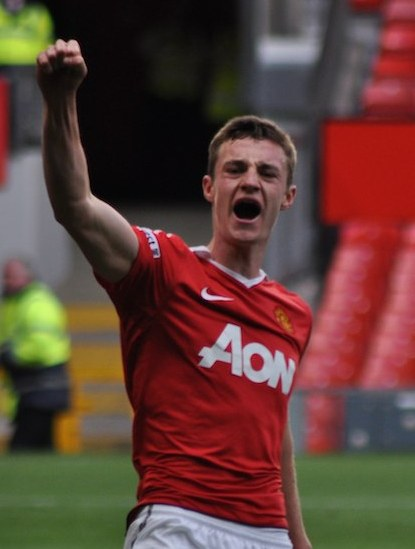
Will Keane made three appearances for Manchester United.

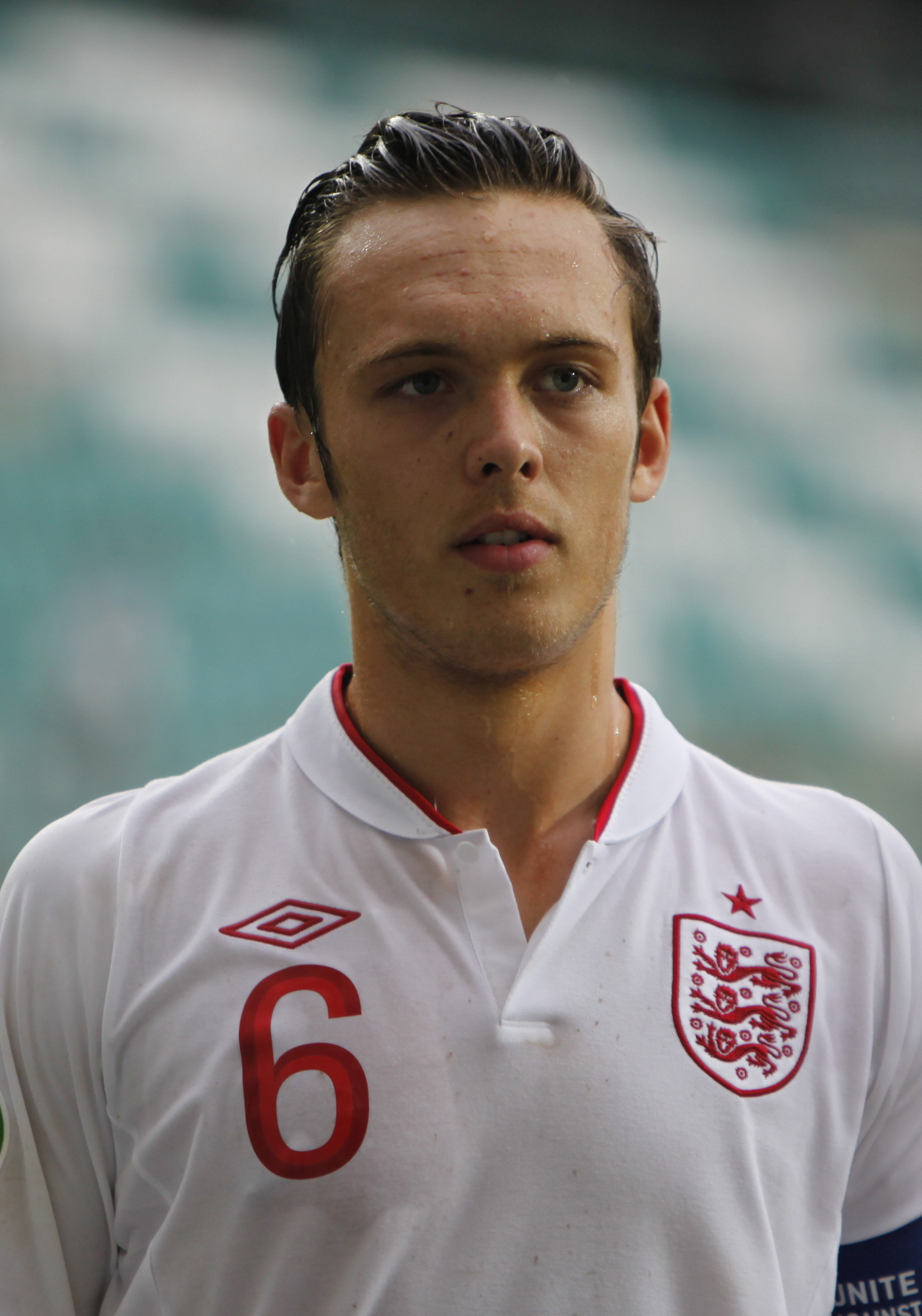
Tom Thorpe made one appearance for Manchester United.

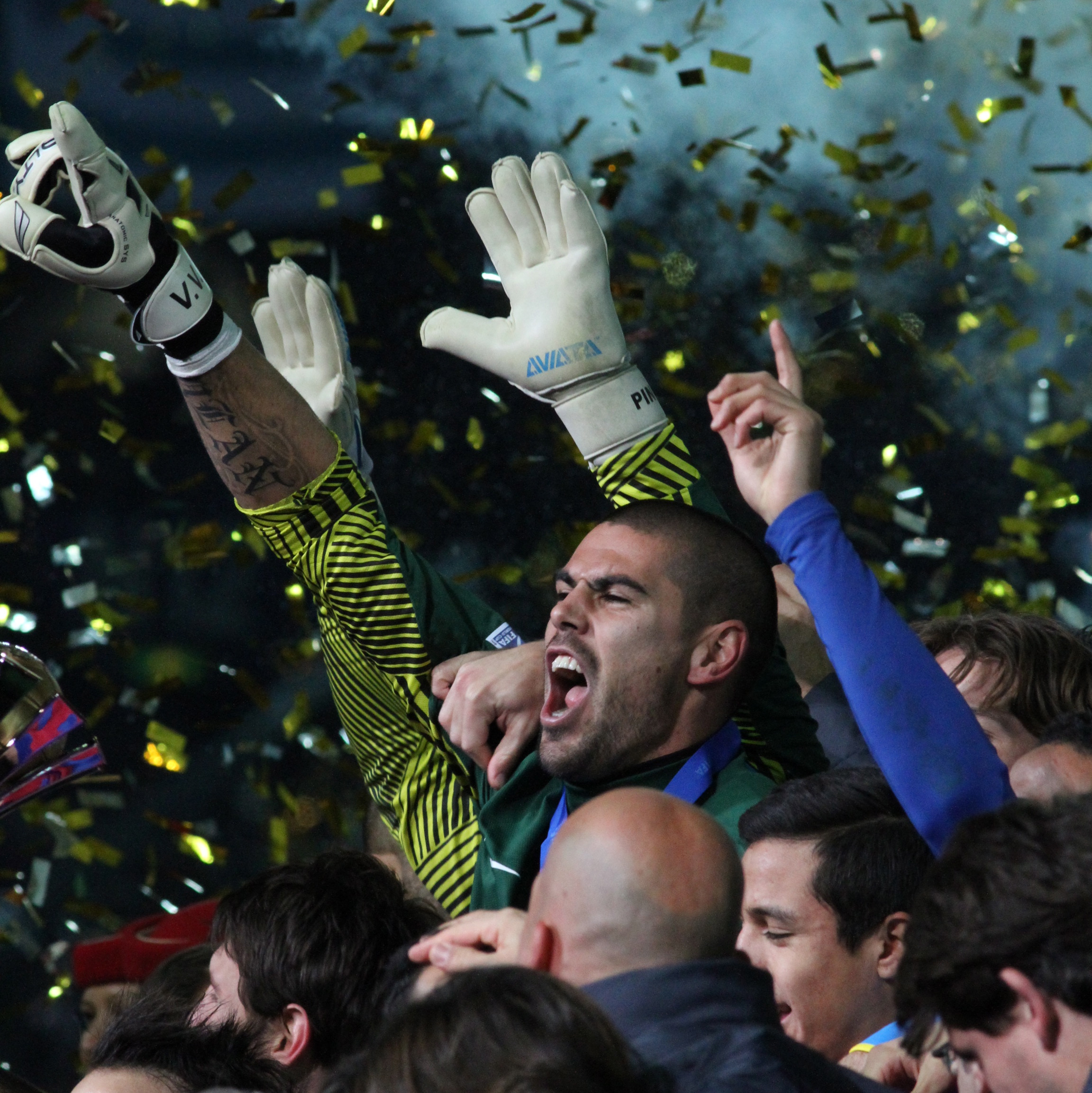
Víctor Valdés made two appearances for Manchester United.

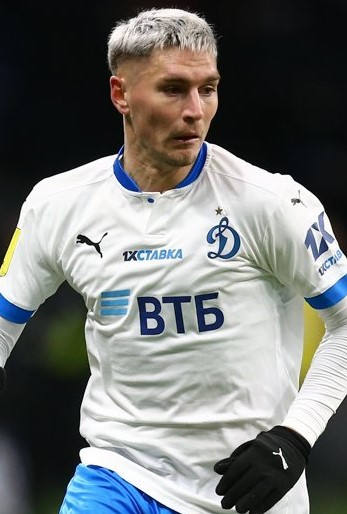
Guillermo Varela made 11 appearances for Manchester United.

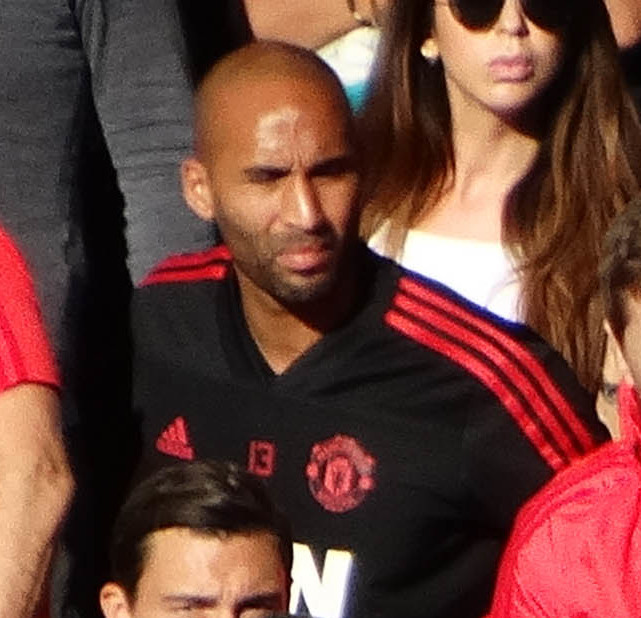
Lee Grant made two appearances for Manchester United.

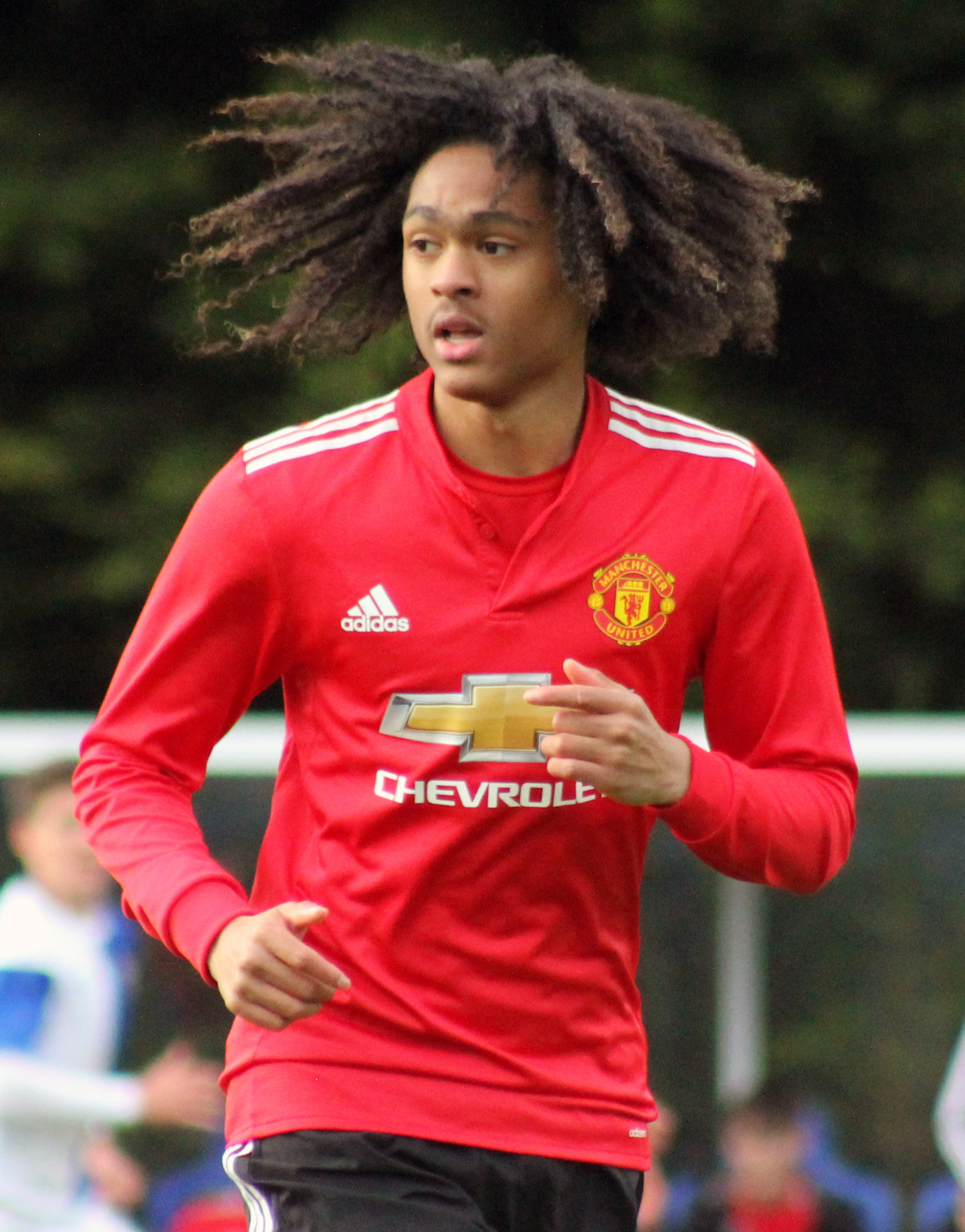
Tahith Chong made 16 appearances for Manchester United.

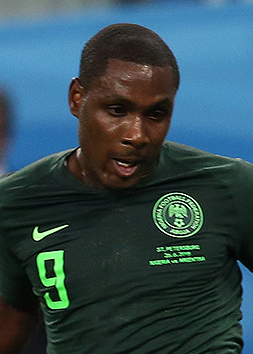
Odion Ighalo made 23 appearances during his loan spell with Manchester United.

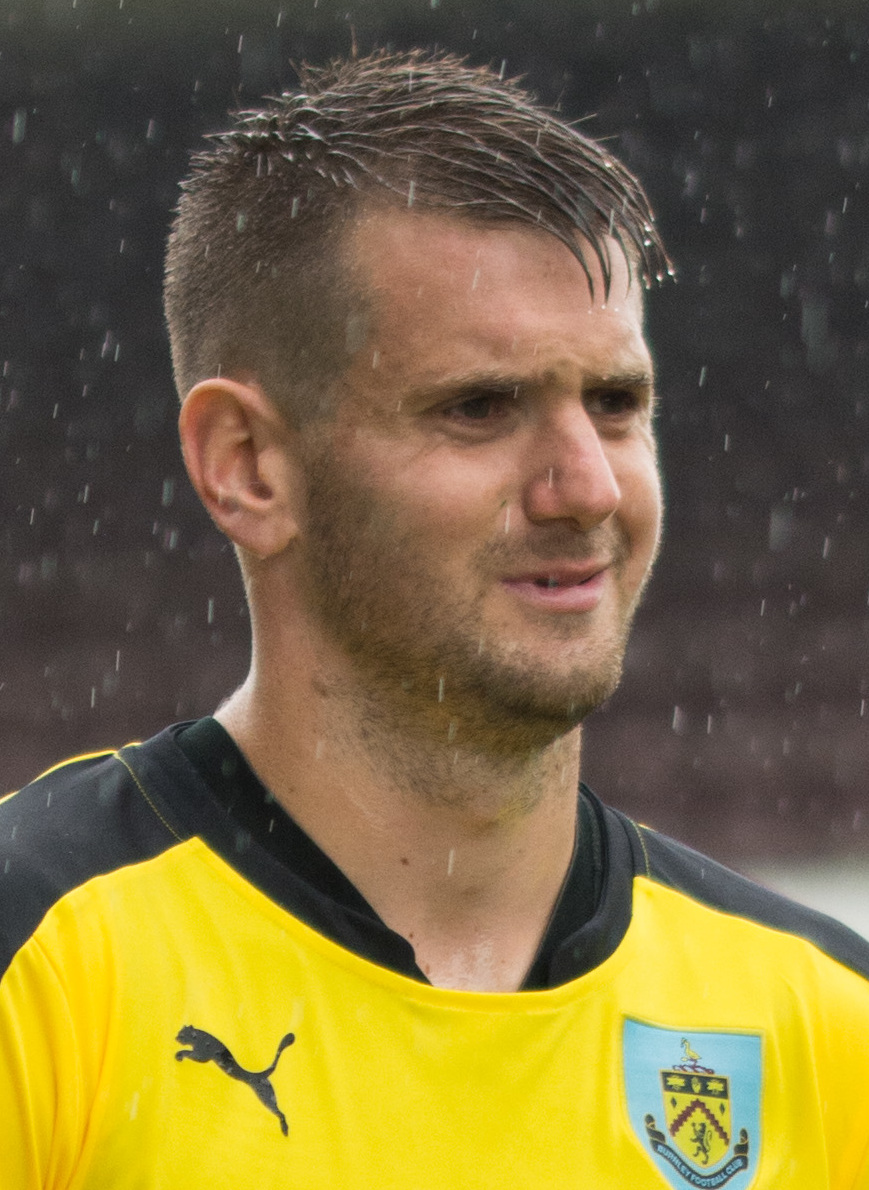
Tom Heaton has made three appearances for Manchester United.

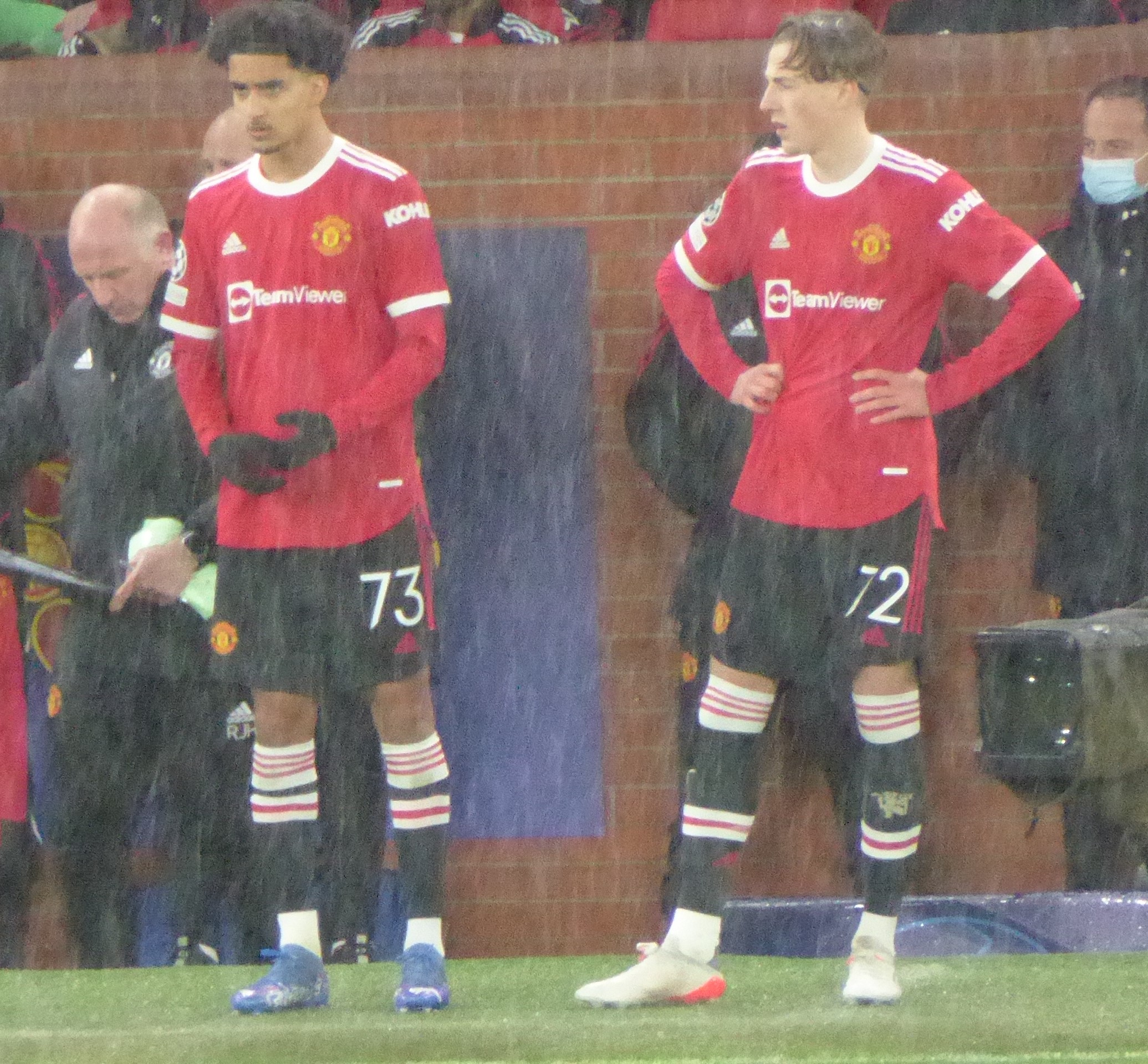
Zidane Iqbal (left) and Charlie Savage (right) each made their sole appearance for Manchester United as substitutes against BSC Young Boys in 2021.

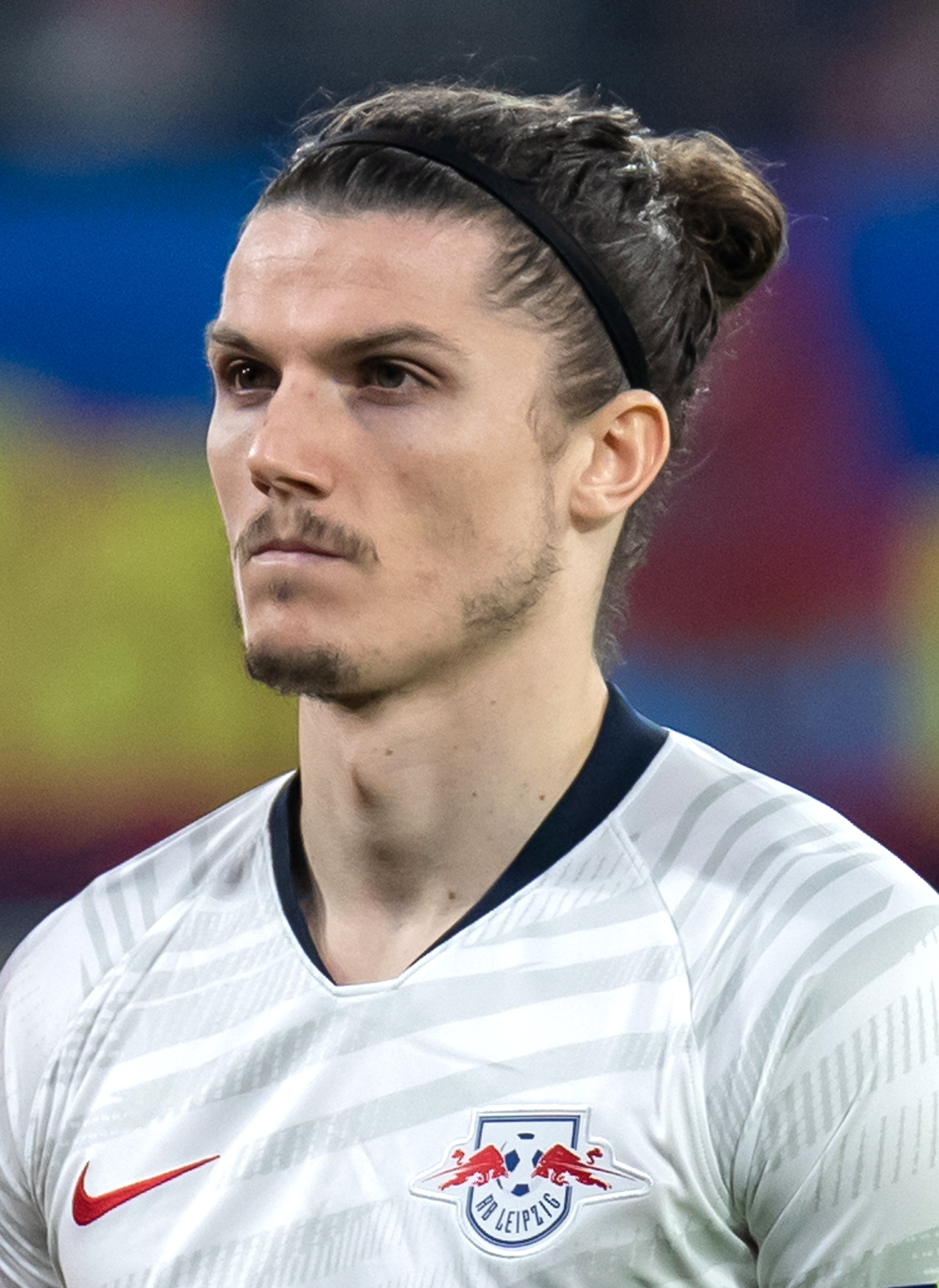
Marcel Sabitzer made 18 appearances during his loan spell with Manchester United.

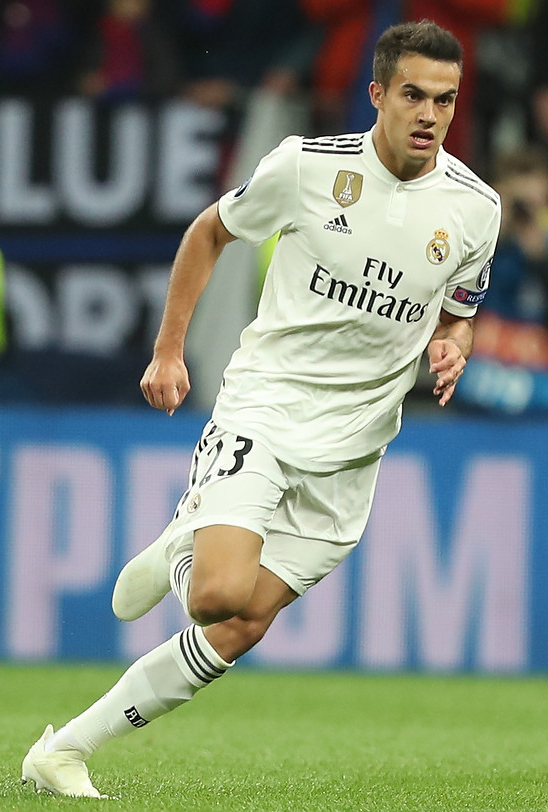
Sergio Reguilón made 12 appearances during his loan spell with Manchester United.

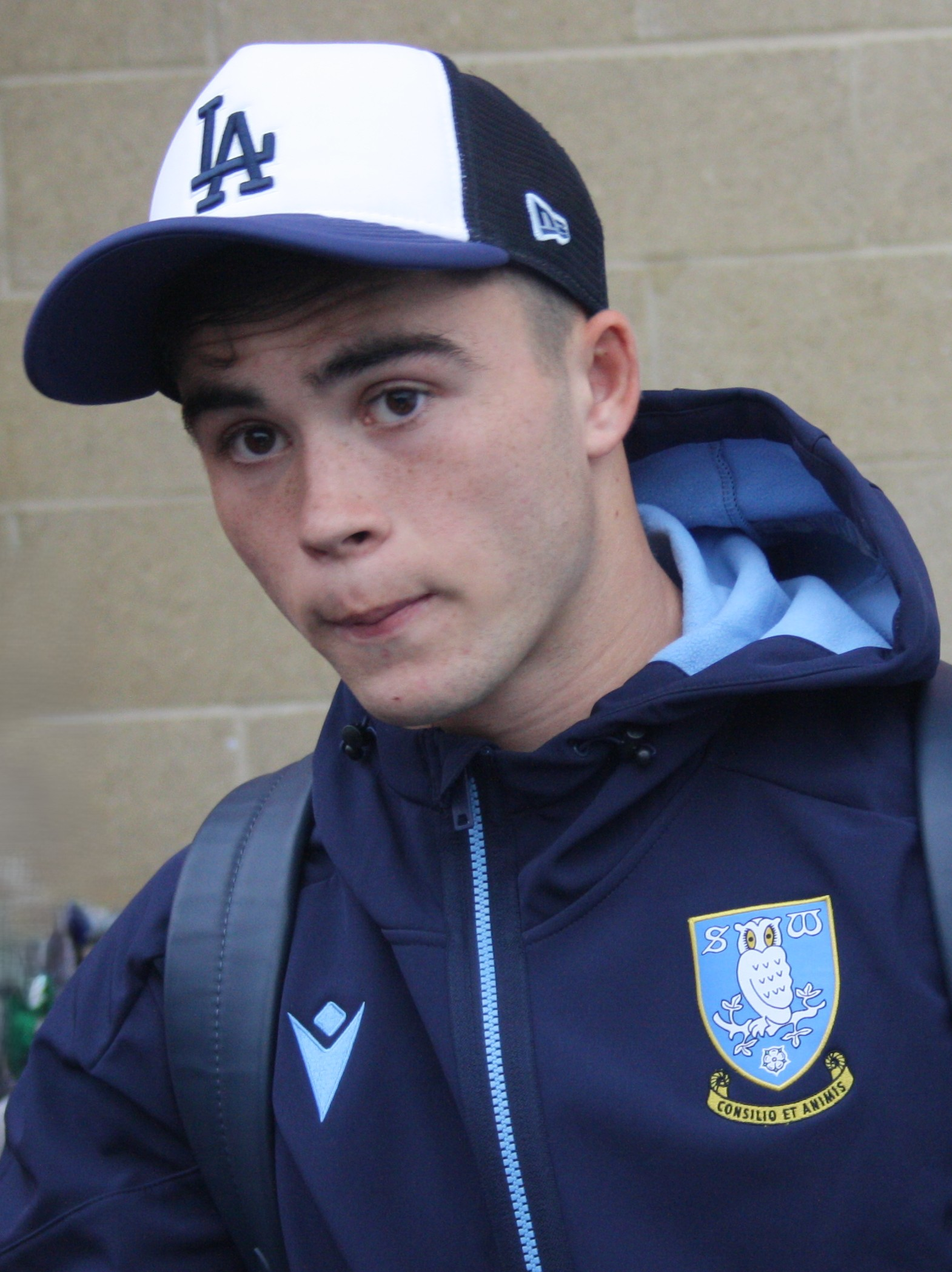
Harry Amass has made nine appearances for Manchester United.

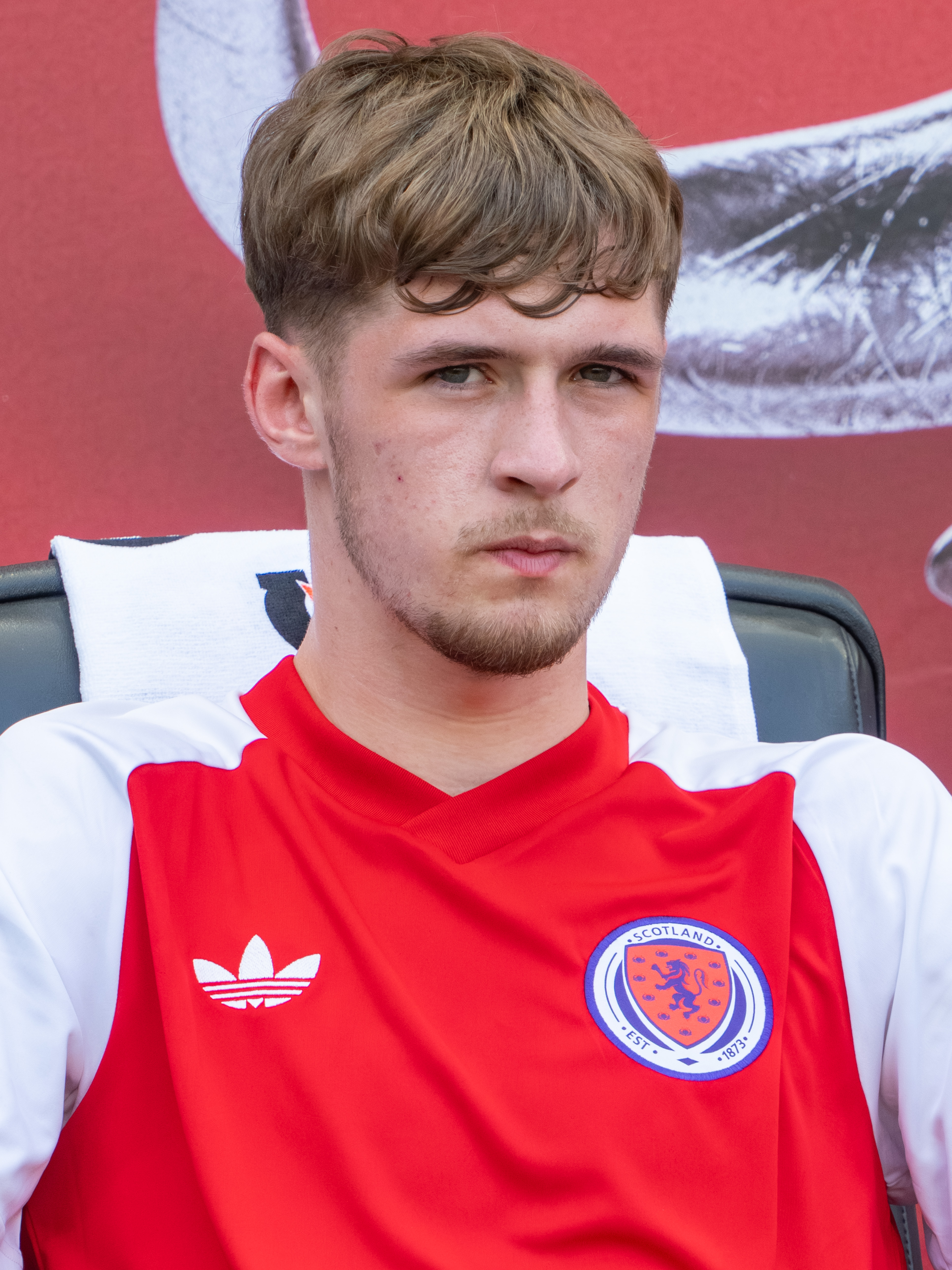
Tyler Fletcher has made two appearances for Manchester United.

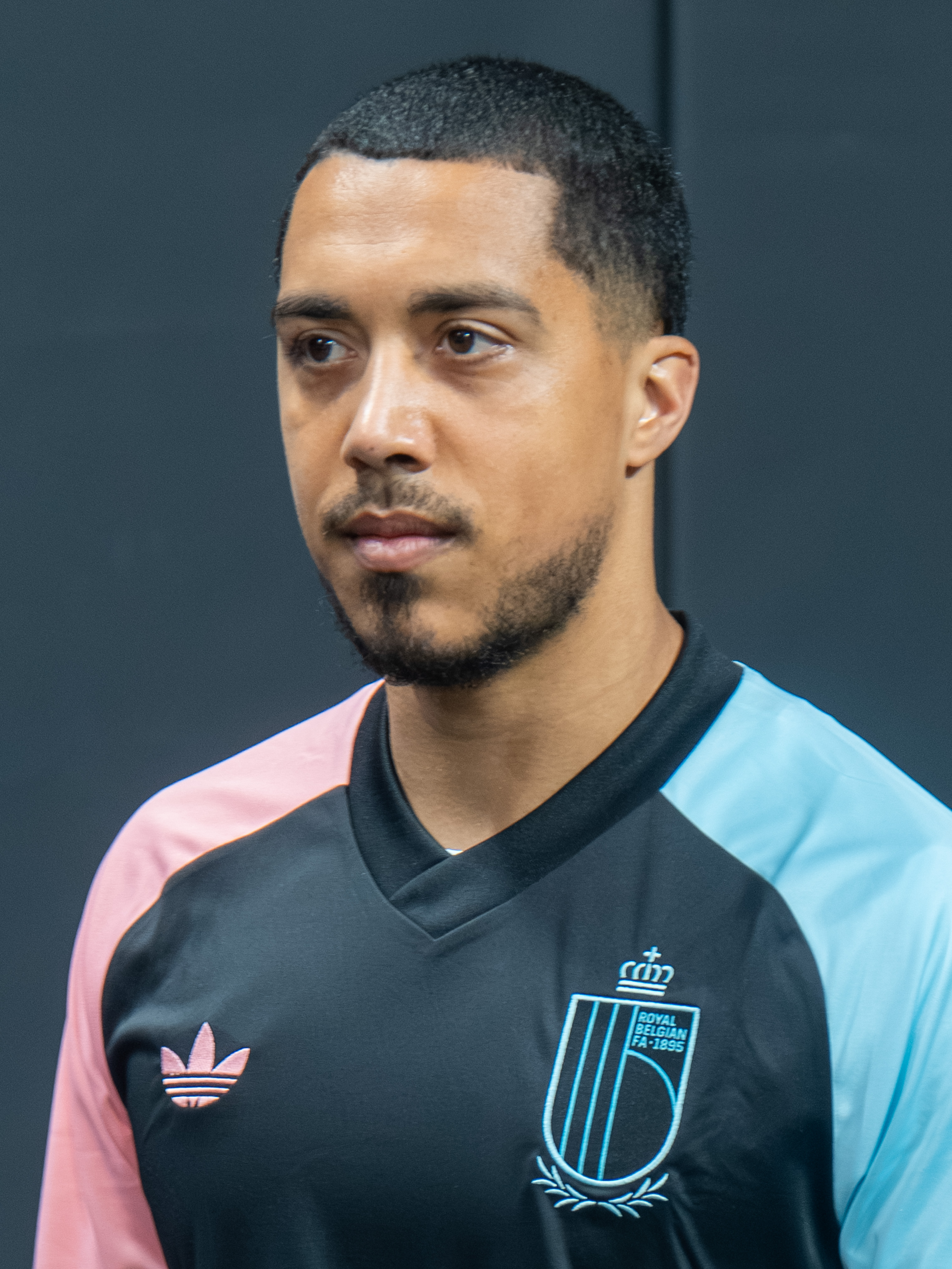
Youri Tielemans has made 13 appearances for Manchester United.
- Appearances and goals are for first-team competitive matches only, including Premier League, Football League, FA Cup, League Cup, Charity/Community Shield, European Cup/Champions League, UEFA Cup/Europa League, Cup Winners' Cup, Inter-Cities Fairs Cup, Super Cup and Club World Cup matches; wartime matches are regarded as unofficial and are excluded, as are matches from the abandoned 1939–40 season.
- Players are listed according to the date of their first-team debut for the club.
- Players in **bold** are currently under contract with Manchester United.

Statistics correct as of match played 8 November 2026

Table headers

- **Nationality** – If a player played international football, the country/countries he played for are shown. Otherwise, the player's nationality is given as their country of birth.
- **Manchester United career** – The year of the player's first appearance for Manchester United to the year of his last appearance.
- **Starts** – The number of matches started.
- **Sub** – The number of matches played as a substitute.
- **Total** – The total number of matches played, both as a starter and as a substitute.

Positions key
| Pre-1960s | | Post-1960s | |
|---|---|---|---|
| GK | Goalkeeper | | |
| FB | Full back | DF | Defender |
| HB | Half back | MF | Midfielder |
| FW | Forward | | |
| U | Utility player^{1} | | |

List of Manchester United F.C. players with fewer than 25 appearances
| Name | Nationality | Position | Manchester United career | Appearances | | | Goals | Ref |
| Name | Nationality | Position | Manchester United career | Starts | Subs | Total | Goals | Ref |
|---|---|---|---|---|---|---|---|---|
| Robert Beckett | England | GK | 1886 | 1 | 0 | 1 | 0 | |
| Tom Burke | Wales | HB | 1886 | 1 | 0 | 1 | 0 | |
| Joe Davies | Wales | HB | 1886; 1890 | 2 | 0 | 2 | 0 | |
| Heber Davies | Wales | FW | 1886 | 1 | 0 | 1 | 0 | |
| Jack Doughty | Wales | FW | 1886–1891 | 3 | 0 | 3 | 3 | |
| John Earp | England | FW | 1886 | 1 | 0 | 1 | 0 | |
| James Gotheridge | England | FW | 1886 | 1 | 0 | 1 | 0 | |
| Edward Howles | England | HB | 1886 | 1 | 0 | 1 | 0 | |
| A Longton | unknown | FW | 1886 | 1 | 0 | 1 | 0 | |
| John Mitchell | unknown | FB | 1886; 1890 | 3 | 0 | 3 | 0 | |
| Jack Powell | Wales | FB | 1886; 1890–1891 | 4 | 0 | 4 | 0 | |
| Thomas Craig | unknown | FW | 1890 | 2 | 0 | 2 | 1 | |
| Roger Doughty | Wales | FW | 1889–1892; 1897 | 8 | 0 | 8 | 1 | |
| Charlie Harrison | England | FB | 1890 | 1 | 0 | 1 | 0 | |
| Tom Hay | England | GK | 1890 | 1 | 0 | 1 | 0 | |
| George Owen | Wales | FW | 1890 | 1 | 0 | 1 | 0 | |
| Jack Owen | Wales | HB | 1890–1891 | 6 | 0 | 6 | 0 | |
| Edgar Wilson | England | FW | 1890 | 1 | 0 | 1 | 0 | |
| George Evans | England | FW | 1890 | 1 | 0 | 1 | 1 | |
| Bob Milarvie | Scotland | FW | 1890 | 1 | 0 | 1 | 0 | |
| Bob Ramsay | England | FB | 1890 | 1 | 0 | 1 | 0 | |
| William Sharpe | England | FW | 1890–1891 | 2 | 0 | 2 | 0 | |
| John Slater | England | GK | 1890–1891 | 4 | 0 | 4 | 0 | |
| Herbert Dale | England | FW | 1890 | 1 | 0 | 1 | 0 | |
| John Donnelly | England | FW | 1890 | 1 | 0 | 1 | 0 | |
| Charles Felton | England | HB | 1890 | 1 | 0 | 1 | 0 | |
| William Gyves | England | GK | 1890 | 1 | 0 | 1 | 0 | |
| Thomas O'Shaughnessy | Wales | FW | 1890 | 1 | 0 | 1 | 0 | |
| William Rattigan | England | HB | 1890 | 1 | 0 | 1 | 0 | |
| William Turner | England | FW | 1890 | 1 | 0 | 1 | 0 | |
| Alf Edge | England | FW | 1891 | 3 | 0 | 3 | 3 | |
| Arthur Henrys | Scotland | HB | 1891–1893 | 6 | 0 | 6 | 0 | |
| Bob McFarlane | Scotland | FB | 1891 | 3 | 0 | 3 | 0 | |
| John Sneddon | Scotland | FW | 1891 | 3 | 0 | 3 | 1 | |
| Joseph Denman | England | FB | 1891 | 1 | 0 | 1 | 0 | |
| James Brown | Scotland | FB | 1892–1893 | 7 | 0 | 7 | 0 | |
| Adam Carson | Scotland | FW | 1892–1893 | 13 | 0 | 13 | 3 | |
| James Colville | unknown | FW | 1892–1893 | 10 | 0 | 10 | 1 | |
| John Davies | England | GK | 1892–1893 | 10 | 0 | 10 | 0 | |
| James Hendry | Scotland | FW | 1892 | 2 | 0 | 2 | 1 | |
| Joe Kinloch | England | FW | 1892 | 1 | 0 | 1 | 0 | |
| William Mathieson | Scotland | FW | 1892–1894 | 10 | 0 | 10 | 2 | |
| Jimmy Warner | England | GK | 1892–1893 | 22 | 0 | 22 | 0 | |
| William Campbell | Scotland | FW | 1893–1894 | 5 | 0 | 5 | 1 | |
| John Graham | England | FW | 1893–1894 | 4 | 0 | 4 | 0 | |
| Samuel Parker | Scotland | FW | 1893–1894 | 11 | 0 | 11 | 0 | |
| S Prince | England | FW | 1893–1894 | 2 | 0 | 2 | 0 | |
| William Brady | Scotland | FW | 1893 | 1 | 0 | 1 | 0 | |
| William Thompson | Scotland | FW | 1893–1894 | 3 | 0 | 3 | 0 | |
| Herbert Stone | England | FB | 1893–1895 | 7 | 0 | 7 | 0 | |
| Charles Rothwell | England | FW | 1893–1897 | 3 | 0 | 3 | 3 | |
| John McCartney | Scotland | FB | 1894–1895 | 20 | 0 | 20 | 1 | |
| George Millar | Scotland | FW | 1894–1895 | 7 | 0 | 7 | 5 | |
| David McFetteridge | Scotland | FW | 1895 | 1 | 0 | 1 | 0 | |
| William Longair | Scotland | FB | 1895 | 1 | 0 | 1 | 0 | |
| James Cairns | unknown | FB | 1895 | 1 | 0 | 1 | 0 | |
| John Aitken | Scotland | FW | 1895 | 2 | 0 | 2 | 1 | |
| Robert Stephenson | unknown | FW | 1896 | 1 | 0 | 1 | 1 | |
| Walter Whittaker | England | GK | 1896 | 3 | 0 | 3 | 0 | |
| John Whitney | England | MF | 1896; 1901 | 3 | 0 | 3 | 0 | |
| James Vance | England | FW | 1895–1897 | 11 | 0 | 11 | 1 | |
| Joe Ridgway | England | GK | 1895–1898 | 17 | 0 | 17 | 0 | |
| Rimmer Brown | unknown | FW | 1896–1897 | 7 | 0 | 7 | 2 | |
| Joe Wetherell | England | GK | 1896 | 2 | 0 | 2 | 0 | |
| James Carman | England | FW | 1897–1898 | 3 | 0 | 3 | 1 | |
| William Dunn | England | FW | 1897–1898 | 12 | 0 | 12 | 0 | |
| Harry Erentz | Scotland | FB | 1897–1898 | 9 | 0 | 9 | 0 | |
| Frank Wedge | England | FW | 1897 | 2 | 0 | 2 | 2 | |
| William Brooks | England | FW | 1898 | 3 | 0 | 3 | 3 | |
| James Cairns | unknown | FW | 1898 | 1 | 0 | 1 | 0 | |
| James Connachan | Scotland | FW | 1898 | 4 | 0 | 4 | 1 | |
| John Cunningham | Scotland | FW | 1898–1899 | 17 | 0 | 17 | 2 | |
| Owen Jones | Wales | FW | 1898 | 2 | 0 | 2 | 0 | |
| William Owen | Wales | FW | 1898 | 1 | 0 | 1 | 0 | |
| Frank Pepper | England | FB | 1898–1899 | 8 | 0 | 8 | 0 | |
| Robert Turner | England | FB | 1898–1899 | 2 | 0 | 2 | 0 | |
| John Turner | England | HB | 1898; 1902 | 3 | 0 | 3 | 0 | |
| Edwin Lee | England | FW | 1898–1900 | 11 | 0 | 11 | 5 | |
| Bogie Roberts | unknown | FW | 1898–1900 | 10 | 0 | 10 | 2 | |
| George Radcliffe | England | FW | 1899 | 1 | 0 | 1 | 0 | |
| Robert Walker | unknown | FB | 1899 | 2 | 0 | 2 | 0 | |
| John Gourlay | Scotland | FW | 1899 | 1 | 0 | 1 | 0 | |
| Joe Heathcote | England | FW | 1899 | 8 | 0 | 8 | 0 | |
| James Hopkins | England | FW | 1899 | 1 | 0 | 1 | 0 | |
| James Bain | Scotland | FW | 1899 | 2 | 0 | 2 | 1 | |
| Peter Blackmore | England | FW | 1899 | 2 | 0 | 2 | 0 | |
| Joe Clark | Scotland | FW | 1899–1900 | 9 | 0 | 9 | 0 | |
| George Foley | England | FW | 1900 | 7 | 0 | 7 | 1 | |
| Gilbert Godsmark | England | FW | 1899–1900 | 9 | 0 | 9 | 4 | |
| Bob Parkinson | England | FW | 1899–1900 | 15 | 0 | 15 | 7 | |
| Thomas Sawyer | unknown | FW | 1899–1900 | 6 | 0 | 6 | 0 | |
| Alfred Ambler | England | HB | 1899–1901 | 10 | 0 | 10 | 1 | |
| Jack Grundy | England | MF | 1899–1901 | 11 | 0 | 11 | 3 | |
| Edward Holt | England | FW | 1900 | 1 | 0 | 1 | 1 | |
| William Booth | England | FW | 1900 | 2 | 0 | 2 | 0 | |
| James Garvey | England | GK | 1900–1901 | 6 | 0 | 6 | 0 | |
| Wilson Greenwood | England | FW | 1900 | 3 | 0 | 3 | 0 | |
| Reg Lawson | England | FW | 1900 | 3 | 0 | 3 | 0 | |
| Hugh Morgan | Scotland | FW | 1900–1901 | 23 | 0 | 23 | 4 | |
| Samuel Johnson | England | FW | 1901 | 1 | 0 | 1 | 0 | |
| Alexander Higgins | England | HB | 1901–1902 | 10 | 0 | 10 | 0 | |
| Billy Richards | England | FW | 1901–1902 | 9 | 0 | 9 | 1 | |
| Stockport Smith | England | FW | 1901–1902 | 17 | 0 | 17 | 0 | |
| Bill Williams | England | FW | 1901–1902 | 4 | 0 | 4 | 0 | |
| James Saunders | England | GK | 1901–1903 | 13 | 0 | 13 | 0 | |
| George O'Brien | England | FW | 1902 | 1 | 0 | 1 | 0 | |
| James Higson | England | FW | 1902 | 5 | 0 | 5 | 1 | |
| Billy Ball | England | FB | 1902–1903 | 4 | 0 | 4 | 0 | |
| Arthur Beadsworth | England | FW | 1902–1903 | 12 | 0 | 12 | 2 | |
| William Bunce | England | FB | 1902 | 2 | 0 | 2 | 0 | |
| Daniel Hurst | England | FW | 1902–1903 | 21 | 0 | 21 | 4 | |
| Arthur Marshall | England | FB | 1902–1903 | 6 | 0 | 6 | 0 | |
| Charlie Richards | England | FW | 1902–1903 | 11 | 0 | 11 | 2 | |
| Lawrence Smith | England | FW | 1902–1903 | 10 | 0 | 10 | 1 | |
| Ernest Street | England | FW | 1902–1903 | 3 | 0 | 3 | 0 | |
| Fred Williams | England | FW | 1902–1903 | 10 | 0 | 10 | 4 | |
| Jack Fitchett | England | FB | 1903; 1905 | 18 | 0 | 18 | 1 | |
| John Christie | England | FB | 1903 | 1 | 0 | 1 | 0 | |
| Harry Cleaver | England | FW | 1903 | 1 | 0 | 1 | 0 | |
| Ralph Gaudie | England | FW | 1903–1904 | 8 | 0 | 8 | 0 | |
| Proctor Hall | England | FW | 1903–1904 | 8 | 0 | 8 | 2 | |
| William McCartney | Scotland | FW | 1903–1904 | 13 | 0 | 13 | 1 | |
| Tommy Robertson | Scotland | FW | 1903 | 3 | 0 | 3 | 0 | |
| Harry Wilkinson | England | FW | 1903–1904 | 9 | 0 | 9 | 0 | |
| William Hartwell | England | FW | 1904–1905 | 4 | 0 | 4 | 0 | |
| Hugh Kerr | Scotland | FW | 1904 | 2 | 0 | 2 | 0 | |
| Joe Schofield | England | FW | 1904 | 2 | 0 | 2 | 0 | |
| Charles Mackie | Scotland | FB | 1904–1905 | 7 | 0 | 7 | 4 | |
| George Lyons | Scotland | FW | 1904–1906 | 5 | 0 | 5 | 0 | |
| Bob Valentine | England | GK | 1904–1906 | 10 | 0 | 10 | 0 | |
| Bernard Donaghey | Ireland | FW | 1905–1906 | 3 | 0 | 3 | 0 | |
| Jimmy Dyer | England | FW | 1905 | 1 | 0 | 1 | 0 | |
| Archie Montgomery | Scotland | GK | 1905 | 3 | 0 | 3 | 0 | |
| Horace Blew | Wales | FB | 1906 | 1 | 0 | 1 | 0 | |
| Frank Buckley | England | HB | 1906–1907 | 3 | 0 | 3 | 0 | |
| William Yates | England | FW | 1906 | 3 | 0 | 3 | 0 | |
| Arthur Young | Scotland | FW | 1906 | 2 | 0 | 2 | 0 | |
| Bill Berry | England | FW | 1906–1909 | 14 | 0 | 14 | 1 | |
| Joe Williams | England | FW | 1907 | 3 | 0 | 3 | 1 | |
| Herbert Broomfield | England | GK | 1907–1908 | 9 | 0 | 9 | 0 | |
| Ernest Thomson | England | HB | 1907–1909 | 4 | 0 | 4 | 0 | |
| Ted Dalton | England | FB | 1908 | 1 | 0 | 1 | 0 | |
| Kerr Whiteside | Scotland | MF | 1908 | 1 | 0 | 1 | 0 | |
| Aaron Hulme | England | FB | 1908 | 4 | 0 | 4 | 0 | |
| Tommy Wilson | England | FW | 1908 | 1 | 0 | 1 | 0 | |
| John McGillivray | England | HB | 1908–1909 | 4 | 0 | 4 | 0 | |
| David Christie | Scotland | FW | 1908–1909 | 2 | 0 | 2 | 0 | |
| Harold Hardman | England | FW | 1908 | 4 | 0 | 4 | 0 | |
| Tom Wilcox | England | GK | 1908–1909 | 2 | 0 | 2 | 0 | |
| Joe Curry | England | HB | 1908–1911 | 14 | 0 | 14 | 0 | |
| Ernest Payne | England | FW | 1909 | 2 | 0 | 2 | 1 | |
| Jack Quin | Scotland | FW | 1909–1910 | 2 | 0 | 2 | 0 | |
| Joe Ford | England | FW | 1909 | 5 | 0 | 5 | 0 | |
| Elijah Round | England | GK | 1909–1910 | 2 | 0 | 2 | 0 | |
| Ted Connor | England | FW | 1909–1911 | 15 | 0 | 15 | 2 | |
| Sam Blott | England | FW | 1909–1913 | 19 | 0 | 19 | 2 | |
| Arthur Hooper | England | FW | 1909–1914 | 7 | 0 | 7 | 1 | |
| Leslie Hofton | England | FB | 1910–1913; 1919–1922 | 19 | 0 | 19 | 0 | |
| Freddy Capper | England | FW | 1912 | 1 | 0 | 1 | 0 | |
| Pat McCarthy | Wales | FW | 1912 | 1 | 0 | 1 | 0 | |
| Tom Nuttall | England | FW | 1912–1913 | 16 | 0 | 16 | 4 | |
| Ezra Royals | England | GK | 1911–1914 | 7 | 0 | 7 | 0 | |
| Tommy Gipps | England | HB | 1912–1915 | 23 | 0 | 23 | 0 | |
| Edward Hudson | England | FB | 1912–1919 | 11 | 0 | 11 | 0 | |
| William Hunter | England | FW | 1913 | 3 | 0 | 3 | 2 | |
| Arthur Cashmore | England | FW | 1913–1914 | 3 | 0 | 3 | 0 | |
| Tom Chorlton | England | FB | 1913–1914 | 4 | 0 | 4 | 0 | |
| Robert Roberts | England | FB | 1913–1914 | 2 | 0 | 2 | 0 | |
| James Thomson | Scotland | FW | 1913–1914 | 6 | 0 | 6 | 1 | |
| George Travers | England | FW | 1913–1915 | 21 | 0 | 21 | 4 | |
| Jocelyn Rowe | England | FB | 1914 | 1 | 0 | 1 | 0 | |
| Arthur Allman | England | FB | 1914–1915 | 12 | 0 | 12 | 0 | |
| Sam Cookson | Wales | HB | 1914–1915 | 13 | 0 | 13 | 0 | |
| George Hunter | England | HB | 1914–1915 | 23 | 0 | 23 | 2 | |
| Walter Spratt | England | FB | 1914–1920 | 13 | 0 | 13 | 0 | |
| Albert Prince | England | FW | 1915 | 1 | 0 | 1 | 0 | |
| Frank Hodges | England | FW | 1919–1921 | 20 | 0 | 20 | 4 | |
| Billy Toms | Ireland | FW | 1919–1921 | 14 | 0 | 14 | 4 | |
| James Robinson | Ireland | FW | 1919–1922 | 21 | 0 | 21 | 3 | |
| John Prentice | England | FW | 1920 | 1 | 0 | 1 | 0 | |
| Harry Leonard | England | FW | 1920–1921 | 10 | 0 | 10 | 5 | |
| John Williamson | England | MF | 1920 | 2 | 0 | 2 | 0 | |
| Billy Goodwin | England | FW | 1920–1922 | 7 | 0 | 7 | 1 | |
| George Schofield | England | FW | 1920 | 1 | 0 | 1 | 0 | |
| George Albinson | England | FB | 1921 | 1 | 0 | 1 | 0 | |
| Frank Brett | England | FB | 1921–1922 | 10 | 0 | 10 | 0 | |
| Richard Gibson | England | MF | 1921–1922 | 12 | 0 | 12 | 0 | |
| Percy Schofield | England | FW | 1921 | 1 | 0 | 1 | 0 | |
| John Scott | Scotland | FB | 1921–1922 | 24 | 0 | 24 | 0 | |
| John Howarth | England | FB | 1922 | 4 | 0 | 4 | 0 | |
| James Pugh | England | FB | 1922 | 2 | 0 | 2 | 0 | |
| Walter Taylor | England | FW | 1922 | 1 | 0 | 1 | 0 | |
| Bert Cartman | England | FW | 1922 | 3 | 0 | 3 | 0 | |
| David Lyner | Ireland | FW | 1922 | 3 | 0 | 3 | 0 | |
| William Sarvis | Wales | FW | 1922 | 1 | 0 | 1 | 0 | |
| Harry Williams | England | FW | 1922 | 5 | 0 | 5 | 2 | |
| John Wood | Scotland | FW | 1922–1923 | 16 | 0 | 16 | 1 | |
| David Bain | Scotland | FW | 1922–1924 | 23 | 0 | 23 | 9 | |
| Ken MacDonald | Scotland | FW | 1922–1924 | 9 | 0 | 9 | 2 | |
| Jack Barber | England | FW | 1923 | 4 | 0 | 4 | 2 | |
| Albert Broome | England | FW | 1923 | 1 | 0 | 1 | 0 | |
| Wilfred Lievesley | England | FW | 1923 | 3 | 0 | 3 | 0 | |
| Billy Dennis | England | FB | 1923 | 3 | 0 | 3 | 0 | |
| David Ellis | Scotland | FW | 1923–1924 | 11 | 0 | 11 | 0 | |
| Sidney Evans | England | FW | 1923–1924 | 6 | 0 | 6 | 2 | |
| Syd Tyler | England | FB | 1923 | 1 | 0 | 1 | 0 | |
| Fred Kennedy | England | FW | 1923–1925 | 18 | 0 | 18 | 4 | |
| James Miller | Scotland | FW | 1924 | 4 | 0 | 4 | 1 | |
| Albert Pape | England | FW | 1924–1926 | 18 | 0 | 18 | 5 | |
| Jimmy Bain | Scotland | HB | 1924–1928 | 4 | 0 | 4 | 0 | |
| Charlie Hannaford | England | FW | 1925–1927 | 11 | 0 | 11 | 0 | |
| Richard Iddon | England | FW | 1925; 1927 | 2 | 0 | 2 | 0 | |
| James McCrae | Scotland | HB | 1926–1927 | 13 | 0 | 13 | 0 | |
| Jack Hall | England | FW | 1926 | 3 | 0 | 3 | 0 | |
| Joe Astley | England | FB | 1926–1927 | 2 | 0 | 2 | 0 | |
| Bill Inglis | Scotland | FB | 1926; 1928 | 14 | 0 | 14 | 1 | |
| Tom Harris | England | FW | 1926–1927 | 4 | 0 | 4 | 1 | |
| Ron Haworth | England | FW | 1926–1927 | 2 | 0 | 2 | 0 | |
| Albert Smith | Scotland | FW | 1926–1927 | 5 | 0 | 5 | 1 | |
| George Nicol | Scotland | FW | 1927–1929 | 7 | 0 | 7 | 2 | |
| Charlie Ramsden | England | FW | 1927–1931 | 16 | 0 | 16 | 3 | |
| Danny Ferguson | England | FW | 1928 | 4 | 0 | 4 | 0 | |
| Tommy Boyle | England | FW | 1929–1930 | 17 | 0 | 17 | 6 | |
| Arthur Thomson | England | FW | 1928–1931 | 5 | 0 | 5 | 1 | |
| Arthur Chesters | England | GK | 1929–1932 | 9 | 0 | 9 | 0 | |
| Jimmy Bullock | England | FW | 1930–1931 | 10 | 0 | 10 | 3 | |
| Frank Williams | England | MF | 1930 | 3 | 0 | 3 | 0 | |
| George Lydon | England | HB | 1930–1932 | 3 | 0 | 3 | 0 | |
| Thomas Parker | England | FB | 1930–1932 | 17 | 0 | 17 | 0 | |
| Harold Dean | England | FW | 1931 | 2 | 0 | 2 | 0 | |
| Leslie Lievesley | England | FB | 1932 | 3 | 0 | 3 | 0 | |
| John Ferguson | England | FW | 1931 | 8 | 0 | 8 | 1 | |
| Herbert Mann | England | FW | 1931–1932 | 13 | 0 | 13 | 2 | |
| Matt Robinson | England | FW | 1931–1932 | 10 | 0 | 10 | 0 | |
| John Whittle | England | FW | 1932 | 1 | 0 | 1 | 0 | |
| Louis Page | England | FW | 1931–1933 | 12 | 0 | 12 | 0 | |
| Dick Black | Scotland | FW | 1931–1934 | 8 | 0 | 8 | 3 | |
| Henry Topping | England | FB | 1932–1935 | 12 | 0 | 12 | 1 | |
| Andy Mitchell | England | FW | 1933 | 1 | 0 | 1 | 0 | |
| Arthur Fitton | England | FW | 1932 | 12 | 0 | 12 | 2 | |
| David Byrne | Republic of Ireland | FW | 1933 | 4 | 0 | 4 | 3 | |
| Eddie Green | England | FW | 1933–1934 | 9 | 0 | 9 | 4 | |
| Herbert Heywood | England | FW | 1933 | 4 | 0 | 4 | 2 | |
| Charlie Hillam | England | GK | 1933–1934 | 8 | 0 | 8 | 0 | |
| Charlie McGillivray | Scotland | FW | 1933–1934 | 9 | 0 | 9 | 0 | |
| George Nevin | England | FB | 1934 | 4 | 0 | 4 | 0 | |
| Percy Newton | England | FB | 1934 | 2 | 0 | 2 | 0 | |
| Alf Ainsworth | England | FW | 1934 | 2 | 0 | 2 | 0 | |
| Billy Behan | Republic of Ireland | GK | 1934 | 1 | 0 | 1 | 0 | |
| Tom Manns | England | HB | 1934 | 2 | 0 | 2 | 0 | |
| Billy Boyd | Scotland | FW | 1934–1935 | 6 | 0 | 6 | 4 | |
| Tommy Jones | Wales | FW | 1934–1935 | 22 | 0 | 22 | 4 | |
| Len Langford | England | GK | 1934–1936 | 15 | 0 | 15 | 0 | |
| Bill Owen | England | FW | 1934–1936 | 17 | 0 | 17 | 1 | |
| Ron Ferrier | England | FW | 1935–1938 | 19 | 0 | 19 | 4 | |
| Reg Chester | England | FW | 1935–1936 | 13 | 0 | 13 | 1 | |
| Tommy Lang | Scotland | FW | 1935–1936 | 13 | 0 | 13 | 1 | |
| Ben Morton | England | FB | 1935 | 1 | 0 | 1 | 0 | |
| David Robbie | Scotland | FW | 1935 | 1 | 0 | 1 | 0 | |
| Dick Gardner | England | FW | 1935–1937 | 18 | 0 | 18 | 1 | |
| Reg Halton | England | FW | 1936 | 4 | 0 | 4 | 1 | |
| Jimmy McClelland | Scotland | FW | 1936–1937 | 5 | 0 | 5 | 1 | |
| Roy John | Wales | GK | 1936–1937 | 15 | 0 | 15 | 0 | |
| Ernie Thompson | England | FW | 1936–1937 | 3 | 0 | 3 | 1 | |
| David Jones | Wales | FB | 1937 | 1 | 0 | 1 | 0 | |
| Robert Murray | Scotland | FW | 1937 | 4 | 0 | 4 | 0 | |
| Ted Savage | England | FB | 1937 | 5 | 0 | 5 | 0 | |
| Charlie Craven | England | FW | 1938 | 11 | 0 | 11 | 2 | |
| Tommy Dougan | Scotland | FW | 1939 | 4 | 0 | 4 | 0 | |
| Norman Tapken | England | GK | 1938–1939 | 16 | 0 | 16 | 0 | |
| Len Bradbury | England | FW | 1939 | 2 | 0 | 2 | 1 | |
| Beaumont Asquith | England | FW | 1939 | 1 | 0 | 1 | 0 | |
| Bill Bainbridge | England | FW | 1946 | 1 | 0 | 1 | 1 | |
| Joe Walton | England | FB | 1946–1947 | 23 | 0 | 23 | 0 | |
| John Roach | England | FB | 1946 | 2 | 0 | 2 | 0 | |
| Cliff Collinson | England | GK | 1946 | 7 | 0 | 7 | 0 | |
| Harry Worrall | England | FB | 1946–1947 | 6 | 0 | 6 | 0 | |
| Bill Fielding | England | GK | 1947 | 7 | 0 | 7 | 0 | |
| Ted Buckle | England | FW | 1947–1949 | 24 | 0 | 24 | 7 | |
| Joe Dale | England | FW | 1947 | 2 | 0 | 2 | 0 | |
| Jimmy Pegg | England | GK | 1947 | 2 | 0 | 2 | 0 | |
| John Ball | England | FB | 1948–1950 | 23 | 0 | 23 | 0 | |
| Berry Brown | England | GK | 1948 | 4 | 0 | 4 | 0 | |
| Sammy Lynn | England | FB | 1948–1949 | 13 | 0 | 13 | 0 | |
| Tommy Lowrie | Scotland | HB | 1948–1951 | 14 | 0 | 14 | 0 | |
| Laurie Cassidy | England | FW | 1948–1951 | 4 | 0 | 4 | 0 | |
| Sonny Feehan | Republic of Ireland | GK | 1949–1950 | 14 | 0 | 14 | 0 | |
| Brian Birch | England | FW | 1949–1951 | 15 | 0 | 15 | 5 | |
| Frank Clempson | England | FW | 1950–1952 | 15 | 0 | 15 | 2 | |
| Joe Lancaster | England | GK | 1950 | 4 | 0 | 4 | 0 | |
| Cliff Birkett | England | FW | 1950–1951 | 13 | 0 | 13 | 2 | |
| Ed McIlvenny | United States | HB | 1950 | 2 | 0 | 2 | 0 | |
| John Walton | England | FW | 1951 | 2 | 0 | 2 | 0 | |
| Ernie Bond | England | FW | 1951–1952 | 21 | 0 | 21 | 4 | |
| Eddie Lewis | England | FW | 1952–1955 | 24 | 0 | 24 | 11 | |
| Jackie Scott | Northern Ireland | FW | 1952–1956 | 3 | 0 | 3 | 0 | |
| Les Olive | England | GK | 1953 | 2 | 0 | 2 | 0 | |
| Noel McFarlane | Republic of Ireland | FW | 1954 | 1 | 0 | 1 | 0 | |
| Paddy Kennedy | Republic of Ireland | FB | 1954 | 1 | 0 | 1 | 0 | |
| Geoff Bent | England | FB | 1954–1957 | 12 | 0 | 12 | 0 | |
| Walter Whitehurst | England | FB | 1955 | 1 | 0 | 1 | 0 | |
| Tony Hawksworth | England | GK | 1956 | 1 | 0 | 1 | 0 | |
| Gordon Clayton | England | GK | 1957 | 2 | 0 | 2 | 0 | |
| Stan Crowther | England | HB | 1958 | 20 | 0 | 20 | 0 | |
| Bobby Harrop | England | HB | 1958–1959 | 11 | 0 | 11 | 0 | |
| Kenny Morgans | Wales | FW | 1957–1961 | 23 | 0 | 23 | 0 | |
| Peter Jones | England | FB | 1957 | 11 | 0 | 11 | 0 | |
| Tommy Heron | Scotland | FB | 1958–1960 | 3 | 0 | 3 | 0 | |
| Reg Hunter | Wales | FW | 1958 | 1 | 0 | 1 | 0 | |
| Harold Bratt | England | HB | 1960 | 1 | 0 | 1 | 0 | |
| Frank Haydock | England | FB | 1960–1963 | 6 | 0 | 6 | 0 | |
| Ronnie Briggs | Northern Ireland | GK | 1961–1962 | 11 | 0 | 11 | 0 | |
| Mike Pinner | England | GK | 1961 | 4 | 0 | 4 | 0 | |
| Sammy McMillan | Northern Ireland | FW | 1961–1962 | 15 | 0 | 15 | 6 | |
| Dennis Walker | England | FW | 1963 | 1 | 0 | 1 | 0 | |
| Graham Moore | Wales | MF | 1963–1964 | 19 | 0 | 19 | 5 | |
| Willie Anderson | England | FW | 1963–1966 | 10 | 3 | 13 | 0 | |
| Wilf Tranter | England | HB | 1964 | 1 | 0 | 1 | 0 | |
| Albert Kinsey | England | FW | 1965 | 1 | 0 | 1 | 1 | |
| Frank Kopel | Scotland | DF | 1967–1969 | 10 | 2 | 12 | 0 | |
| Don Givens | Republic of Ireland | FW | 1969 | 5 | 4 | 9 | 1 | |
| Willie Watson | Scotland | DF | 1970–1972 | 14 | 0 | 14 | 0 | |
| Ian Donald | Scotland | DF | 1970–1972 | 6 | 0 | 6 | 0 | |
| John Connaughton | England | GK | 1972 | 3 | 0 | 3 | 0 | |
| Wyn Davies | Wales | FW | 1972–1973 | 16 | 1 | 17 | 4 | |
| Ted MacDougall | Scotland | FW | 1972–1973 | 18 | 0 | 18 | 5 | |
| Trevor Anderson | Northern Ireland | FW | 1973 | 13 | 6 | 19 | 2 | |
| Peter Fletcher | England | FW | 1973–1974 | 2 | 5 | 7 | 0 | |
| Arnie Sidebottom | England | HB | 1973–1975 | 20 | 0 | 20 | 0 | |
| George Buchan | Scotland | FW | 1973 | 0 | 4 | 4 | 0 | |
| Clive Griffiths | Wales | DF | 1973 | 7 | 0 | 7 | 0 | |
| Paul Bielby | England | FW | 1974 | 2 | 2 | 4 | 0 | |
| Ron Davies | Wales | FW | 1974–1975 | 0 | 10 | 10 | 0 | |
| Tommy Baldwin | England | FW | 1975 | 2 | 0 | 2 | 0 | |
| Tony Grimshaw | England | MF | 1975 | 0 | 2 | 2 | 0 | |
| Jimmy Kelly | England | MF | 1975 | 0 | 1 | 1 | 0 | |
| Tommy Jackson | Northern Ireland | MF | 1975–1977 | 22 | 1 | 23 | 0 | |
| Peter Coyne | England | FW | 1976 | 1 | 1 | 2 | 1 | |
| Jonathan Clark | Wales | MF | 1976 | 0 | 1 | 1 | 0 | |
| Colin Waldron | England | DF | 1976 | 4 | 0 | 4 | 0 | |
| Steve Paterson | Scotland | DF | 1976–1979 | 5 | 5 | 10 | 0 | |
| Alan Foggon | England | FW | 1976 | 0 | 3 | 3 | 0 | |
| Martyn Rogers | England | DF | 1977 | 1 | 0 | 1 | 0 | |
| Tom Connell | Northern Ireland | DF | 1978 | 2 | 0 | 2 | 0 | |
| Tom Sloan | Northern Ireland | MF | 1978–1980 | 4 | 8 | 12 | 0 | |
| Anto Whelan | Republic of Ireland | DF | 1980 | 0 | 1 | 1 | 0 | |
| Alan Davies | Wales | FW | 1982–1984 | 8 | 2 | 10 | 1 | |
| Peter Beardsley | England | FW | 1982 | 1 | 0 | 1 | 0 | |
| Laurie Cunningham | England | FW | 1983 | 3 | 2 | 5 | 2 | |
| Jeff Wealands | England | GK | 1983 | 8 | 0 | 8 | 0 | |
| Garth Crooks | England | FW | 1983–1984 | 6 | 1 | 7 | 2 | |
| Mark Dempsey | England | MF | 1983–1985 | 1 | 1 | 2 | 0 | |
| Stephen Pears | England | GK | 1985 | 5 | 0 | 5 | 0 | |
| Nicky Wood | England | FW | 1985–1987 | 2 | 2 | 4 | 0 | |
| Mark Higgins | England | DF | 1986 | 8 | 0 | 8 | 0 | |
| Tony Gill | England | U | 1987–1989 | 7 | 7 | 14 | 2 | |
| Deiniol Graham | Wales | FW | 1987–1989 | 1 | 3 | 4 | 1 | |
| David Wilson | England | MF | 1988–1989 | 0 | 6 | 6 | 0 | |
| Derek Brazil | Republic of Ireland | DF | 1989–1990 | 0 | 2 | 2 | 0 | |
| Giuliano Maiorana | England | FW | 1989 | 2 | 6 | 8 | 0 | |
| Neil Whitworth | England | DF | 1991 | 1 | 0 | 1 | 0 | |
| Paul Wratten | England | MF | 1991 | 0 | 2 | 2 | 0 | |
| Ian Wilkinson | England | GK | 1991 | 1 | 0 | 1 | 0 | |
| Dion Dublin | England | FW | 1992–1994 | 6 | 11 | 17 | 3 | |
| Keith Gillespie | Northern Ireland | FW | 1993–1995 | 7 | 7 | 14 | 2 | |
| Colin McKee | Scotland | FW | 1994 | 1 | 0 | 1 | 0 | |
| Ben Thornley | England | FW | 1994–1998 | 6 | 8 | 14 | 0 | |
| Graeme Tomlinson | England | FW | 1994–1995 | 0 | 2 | 2 | 0 | |
| Chris Casper | England | DF | 1994–1997 | 4 | 3 | 7 | 0 | |
| Simon Davies | Wales | FW | 1994–1996 | 10 | 10 | 20 | 1 | |
| John O'Kane | England | DF | 1994–1997 | 5 | 2 | 7 | 0 | |
| Kevin Pilkington | England | GK | 1994–1997 | 6 | 2 | 8 | 0 | |
| Pat McGibbon | Northern Ireland | DF | 1995 | 1 | 0 | 1 | 0 | |
| William Prunier | France | DF | 1995–1996 | 2 | 0 | 2 | 0 | |
| Terry Cooke | England | FW | 1995–1996 | 2 | 6 | 8 | 1 | |
| Michael Appleton | England | MF | 1996–1997 | 1 | 1 | 2 | 0 | |
| Michael Clegg | England | DF | 1996–2001 | 15 | 9 | 24 | 0 | |
| Phil Mulryne | Northern Ireland | FW | 1997–1998 | 4 | 0 | 4 | 0 | |
| Erik Nevland | Norway | FW | 1997–1998 | 2 | 3 | 5 | 1 | |
| John Curtis | England | DF | 1997–1999 | 9 | 10 | 19 | 0 | |
| Danny Higginbotham | Gibraltar | DF | 1998–2000 | 4 | 3 | 7 | 0 | |
| Michael Twiss | England | MF | 1998–1999 | 1 | 1 | 2 | 0 | |
| Alex Notman | Scotland | FW | 1998 | 0 | 1 | 1 | 0 | |
| Mark Wilson | England | MF | 1998–2000 | 6 | 4 | 10 | 0 | |
| Nick Culkin | England | GK | 1999 | 0 | 1 | 1 | 0 | |
| Massimo Taibi | Italy | GK | 1999 | 4 | 0 | 4 | 0 | |
| Richie Wellens | England | MF | 1999 | 0 | 1 | 1 | 0 | |
| David Healy | Northern Ireland | FW | 1999–2000 | 0 | 3 | 3 | 0 | |
| Paul Rachubka | England | GK | 2000–2001 | 1 | 2 | 3 | 0 | |
| Michael Stewart | Scotland | MF | 2000–2003 | 7 | 7 | 14 | 0 | |
| Danny Webber | England | FW | 2000–2003 | 1 | 2 | 3 | 0 | |
| Andy Goram | Scotland | GK | 2001 | 2 | 0 | 2 | 0 | |
| Bojan Djordjic | Sweden | FW | 2001 | 1 | 1 | 2 | 0 | |
| Jimmy Davis | England | FW | 2001 | 1 | 0 | 1 | 0 | |
| Lee Roche | England | DF | 2001–2003 | 2 | 1 | 3 | 0 | |
| Daniel Nardiello | Wales | FW | 2001–2003 | 1 | 3 | 4 | 0 | |
| Mads Timm | Denmark | FW | 2002 | 0 | 1 | 1 | 0 | |
| Danny Pugh | England | MF | 2002–2004 | 3 | 4 | 7 | 0 | |
| Ricardo | Spain | GK | 2002–2003 | 3 | 2 | 5 | 0 | |
| Mark Lynch | England | DF | 2003 | 1 | 0 | 1 | 0 | |
| Paul Tierney | England | DF | 2003 | 1 | 0 | 1 | 0 | |
| Eddie Johnson | England | FW | 2003 | 0 | 1 | 1 | 0 | |
| Phil Bardsley | England | DF | 2003–2007 | 10 | 8 | 18 | 0 | |
| Chris Eagles | England | DF | 2003–2007 | 7 | 10 | 17 | 1 | |
| Jonathan Spector | United States | DF | 2004–2005 | 4 | 4 | 8 | 0 | |
| Sylvan Ebanks-Blake | England | FW | 2004–2005 | 1 | 1 | 2 | 1 | |
| Liam Miller | Republic of Ireland | MF | 2004–2006 | 11 | 11 | 22 | 2 | |
| Giuseppe Rossi | Italy | FW | 2004–2006 | 6 | 8 | 14 | 4 | |
| David Jones | England | MF | 2004–2006 | 3 | 1 | 4 | 0 | |
| Gerard Piqué | Spain | DF | 2004–2008 | 14 | 9 | 23 | 2 | |
| Adam Eckersley | England | DF | 2005 | 1 | 0 | 1 | 0 | |
| Ritchie Jones | England | MF | 2005–2006 | 3 | 2 | 5 | 0 | |
| Lee Martin | England | FW | 2005–2009 | 3 | 0 | 3 | 0 | |
| David Gray | Scotland | DF | 2006 | 1 | 0 | 1 | 0 | |
| Michael Barnes | England | FW | 2006 | 0 | 1 | 1 | 0 | |
| Kieran Lee | England | MF | 2006–2007 | 1 | 2 | 3 | 1 | |
| Phil Marsh | England | FW | 2006 | 1 | 0 | 1 | 0 | |
| Ryan Shawcross | England | DF | 2006 | 0 | 2 | 2 | 0 | |
| Henrik Larsson | Sweden | FW | 2007 | 10 | 3 | 13 | 3 | |
| Dong Fangzhuo | China | FW | 2007 | 2 | 1 | 3 | 0 | |
| Fraizer Campbell | England | FW | 2007–2008 | 1 | 3 | 4 | 0 | |
| Danny Simpson | England | DF | 2007–2008 | 4 | 4 | 8 | 0 | |
| Manucho | Angola | FW | 2008 | 0 | 3 | 3 | 0 | |
| Rodrigo Possebon | Italy | MF | 2008–2009 | 3 | 5 | 8 | 0 | |
| Ben Amos | England | GK | 2008–2012 | 7 | 0 | 7 | 0 | |
| Ben Foster | England | GK | 2008–2010 | 23 | 0 | 23 | 0 | |
| James Chester | Wales | DF | 2009 | 0 | 1 | 1 | 0 | |
| Richard Eckersley | England | DF | 2009 | 0 | 4 | 4 | 0 | |
| Ritchie De Laet | Belgium | DF | 2009 | 4 | 2 | 6 | 0 | |
| Mame Biram Diouf | Senegal | FW | 2009–2011 | 2 | 6 | 8 | 1 | |
| Joshua King | Norway | FW | 2009–2012 | 0 | 2 | 2 | 0 | |
| Zoran Tošić | Serbia | MF | 2009 | 0 | 5 | 5 | 0 | |
| Bebé | Cape Verde | FW | 2010–2011 | 3 | 4 | 7 | 2 | |
| Ravel Morrison | Jamaica | MF | 2010–2011 | 0 | 3 | 3 | 0 | |
| Zeki Fryers | England | DF | 2011 | 2 | 4 | 6 | 0 | |
| Larnell Cole | England | MF | 2011 | 0 | 1 | 1 | 0 | |
| Michael Keane | England | DF | 2011–2014 | 3 | 2 | 5 | 0 | |
| Will Keane | Republic of Ireland | FW | 2011–2016 | 0 | 3 | 3 | 0 | |
| Nick Powell | England | MF | 2012–2015 | 3 | 6 | 9 | 1 | |
| Marnick Vermijl | Belgium | DF | 2012–2014 | 2 | 0 | 2 | 0 | |
| Scott Wootton | England | DF | 2012 | 3 | 1 | 4 | 0 | |
| Ryan Tunnicliffe | England | MF | 2012 | 0 | 2 | 2 | 0 | |
| Robbie Brady | Republic of Ireland | MF | 2012 | 0 | 1 | 1 | 0 | |
| Wilfried Zaha | England; Ivory Coast^{2} | FW | 2013 | 2 | 2 | 4 | 0 | |
| James Wilson | England | FW | 2014–2015 | 6 | 14 | 20 | 4 | |
| Tom Lawrence | Wales | MF | 2014 | 1 | 0 | 1 | 0 | |
| Tyler Blackett | England | DF | 2014–2015 | 7 | 5 | 12 | 0 | |
| Saidy Janko | Gambia | DF | 2014 | 1 | 0 | 1 | 0 | |
| Reece James | England | DF | 2014 | 1 | 0 | 1 | 0 | |
| Tom Thorpe | England | DF | 2014 | 0 | 1 | 1 | 0 | |
| Víctor Valdés | Spain | GK | 2015 | 1 | 1 | 2 | 0 | |
| Cameron Borthwick-Jackson | England | DF | 2015–2016 | 9 | 5 | 14 | 0 | |
| Guillermo Varela | Uruguay | DF | 2015–2016 | 10 | 1 | 11 | 0 | |
| Donald Love | Scotland | DF | 2016 | 1 | 1 | 2 | 0 | |
| Joe Riley | England | DF | 2016 | 1 | 1 | 2 | 0 | |
| Regan Poole | Wales | DF | 2016 | 0 | 1 | 1 | 0 | |
| James Weir | England | MF | 2016 | 0 | 1 | 1 | 0 | |
| Joel Castro Pereira | Portugal | GK | 2017 | 1 | 2 | 3 | 0 | |
| Demetri Mitchell | England | DF | 2017 | 1 | 0 | 1 | 0 | |
| Josh Harrop | England | MF | 2017 | 1 | 0 | 1 | 1 | |
| Angel Gomes | England | MF | 2017–2020 | 3 | 7 | 10 | 0 | |
| Lee Grant | England | GK | 2018–2019 | 1 | 1 | 2 | 0 | |
| Tahith Chong | Curaçao | MF | 2019–2020 | 4 | 12 | 16 | 0 | |
| James Garner | England | MF | 2019 | 3 | 4 | 7 | 0 | |
| Di'Shon Bernard | Jamaica | DF | 2019 | 1 | 0 | 1 | 0 | |
| Ethan Laird | England | DF | 2019 | 1 | 1 | 2 | 0 | |
| Dylan Levitt | Wales | MF | 2019 | 1 | 0 | 1 | 0 | |
| D'Mani Mellor | England | FW | 2019 | 0 | 1 | 1 | 0 | |
| Largie Ramazani | Belgium | FW | 2019 | 0 | 1 | 1 | 0 | |
| Ethan Galbraith | Northern Ireland | MF | 2019 | 0 | 1 | 1 | 0 | |
| Odion Ighalo | Nigeria | FW | 2020 | 7 | 16 | 23 | 5 | |
| Teden Mengi | England | DF | 2020–2021 | 0 | 2 | 2 | 0 | |
| Shola Shoretire | England | FW | 2021–2022 | 0 | 5 | 5 | 0 | |
| Hannibal Mejbri | Tunisia | MF | 2021–2024 | 5 | 8 | 13 | 1 | |
| Will Fish | England | DF | 2021 | 0 | 1 | 1 | 0 | |
| **Tom Heaton** | England | GK | 2021– | 2 | 1 | 3 | 0 | |
| Zidane Iqbal | Iraq | MF | 2021 | 0 | 1 | 1 | 0 | |
| Charlie Savage | Wales | MF | 2021 | 0 | 1 | 1 | 0 | |
| Charlie McNeill | England | FW | 2022 | 0 | 1 | 1 | 0 | |
| Martin Dúbravka | Slovakia | GK | 2022 | 2 | 0 | 2 | 0 | |
| Marcel Sabitzer | Austria | MF | 2023 | 10 | 8 | 18 | 3 | |
| Sergio Reguilón | Spain | DF | 2023 | 7 | 5 | 12 | 0 | |
| **Dan Gore** | England | MF | 2023– | 0 | 2 | 2 | 0 | |
| Willy Kambwala | DR Congo | DF | 2023–2024 | 3 | 7 | 10 | 0 | |
| Omari Forson | England | FW | 2024 | 1 | 6 | 7 | 0 | |
| **Altay Bayındır** | Turkey | GK | 2024– | 17 | 0 | 17 | 0 | |
| **Ethan Wheatley** | England | FW | 2024– | 0 | 4 | 4 | 0 | |
| Toby Collyer | England | MF | 2024–2025 | 3 | 10 | 13 | 0 | |
| **Chido Obi** | Denmark | FW | 2025– | 1 | 7 | 8 | 0 | |
| **Harry Amass** | England | DF | 2025– | 4 | 5 | 9 | 0 | |
| Tyler Fredricson | England | DF | 2025 | 3 | 1 | 4 | 0 | |
| **Jack Fletcher** | England | MF | 2025– | 0 | 3 | 3 | 0 | |
| **Shea Lacey** | England | MF | 2025– | 1 | 10 | 11 | 1 | |
| **Bendito Mantato** | England | FW | 2025– | 0 | 1 | 1 | 0 | |
| **Tyler Fletcher** | Scotland | MF | 2026– | 0 | 2 | 2 | 0 | |
| **Youri Tielemans** | Belgium | MF | 2026– | 12 | 1 | 13 | 1 | |
| **Andrey Santos** | Brazil | MF | 2026– | 7 | 3 | 10 | 0 | |
| **Karl Darlow** | Wales | GK | 2026– | 1 | 0 | 1 | 0 | |
| **Carlos Baleba** | Cameroon | MF | 2026– | 5 | 2 | 7 | 0 | |

== Notes ==
- A utility player is one who is considered to play in more than one position.
- While Zaha was a player for Manchester United, he had multiple caps at various levels for the England national team, including the first team. After leaving Manchester United, Zaha subsequently declared for the Ivory Coast and became a full international for the Ivory Coast.
