= 1899–1900 Newton Heath F.C. season =

English football club season

Newton Heath
1899–1900 season
- Secretary: A. H. Albut
- Stadium: Bank Street Ground
- Second Division: 4th
- FA Cup: First round qualifying
- Top goalscorer: League: Joe Cassidy (16); All: Joe Cassidy (16)
- Highest home attendance: 12,000 vs Small Heath (17 February 1900); 12,000 vs Grimsby Town (3 March 1900)
- Lowest home attendance: 5,000 vs eight opponents
- Average home league attendance: 6,059
Home colours	Away colours	Third colours

The 1899–1900 season was Newton Heath's eighth season in the Football League and their sixth in the Second Division. They finished fourth in the league, which was not enough to earn promotion back to the First Division. In the FA Cup, the Heathens were knocked out in the first round qualifying by South Shore.

The club also entered teams in the Lancashire and Manchester Senior Cups in 1899–1900, but little progress was made in either competition. The club received a bye to the third round of the Manchester Senior Cup, but lost 5–0 to Bury. It was a similar story in the Lancashire Cup, as they beat Bolton Wanderers 3–2 in the first round before losing 1–0 to Southport Central in the second round.

== Second Division ==
Date	Opponents	H / A	Result F–A	Scorers	Attendance
2 September 1899	Gainsborough Trinity	H	2–2	Cassidy, Lee	8,000
9 September 1899	Bolton Wanderers	A	1–2	Ambler	5,000
16 September 1899	Loughborough	H	4–0	Bain, Cassidy, Griffiths, own goal	6,000
23 September 1899	Burton Swifts	A	0–0		2,000
30 September 1899	Sheffield Wednesday	A	1–2	Bryant	8,000
7 October 1899	Lincoln City	H	1–0	Cassidy	5,000
14 October 1899	Small Heath	A	0–1		10,000
21 October 1899	New Brighton Tower	H	2–1	Cassidy (2)	5,000
4 November 1899	Woolwich Arsenal	H	2–0	Jackson, Roberts	5,000
11 November 1899	Barnsley	A	0–0		3,000
25 November 1899	Luton Town	A	1–0	Jackson	3,000
2 December 1899	Burslem Port Vale	H	3–0	Cassidy (2), Jackson	5,000
16 December 1899	Middlesbrough	H	2–1	Erentz (pen.), Parkinson	5,000
23 December 1899	Chesterfield	A	1–2	Griffiths	2,000
26 December 1899	Grimsby Town	A	7–0	Bryant (2), Cassidy (2), Jackson, Parkinson, own goal	2,000
30 December 1899	Gainsborough Trinity	A	1–0	Parkinson	2,000
6 January 1900	Bolton Wanderers	H	1–2	Parkinson	5,000
13 January 1900	Loughborough	A	2–0	Jackson, Parkinson	800
20 January 1900	Burton Swifts	H	4–0	Gillespie (3), Parkinson	5,000
3 February 1900	Sheffield Wednesday	H	1–0	Bryant	10,000
10 February 1900	Lincoln City	A	0–1		3,000
17 February 1900	Small Heath	H	3–2	Cassidy, Godsmark, Parkinson	12,000
24 February 1900	New Brighton Tower	A	4–1	Collinson (2), Godsmark, Smith	8,000
3 March 1900	Grimsby Town	H	1–0	Smith	12,000
10 March 1900	Woolwich Arsenal	A	1–2	Cassidy	3,000
17 March 1900	Barnsley	H	3–0	Cassidy (2), Leigh	6,000
24 March 1900	Leicester Fosse	A	0–2		8,000
31 March 1900	Luton Town	H	5–0	Cassidy (3), Godsmark (2)	6,000
7 April 1900	Burslem Port Vale	A	0–1		3,000
13 April 1900	Leicester Fosse	H	3–2	Gillespie, Griffiths, unknown	10,000
14 April 1900	Walsall	H	5–0	Jackson (2), Erentz, Foley, Gillespie	5,000
17 April 1900	Walsall	A	0–0		3,000
21 April 1900	Middlesbrough	A	0–2		8,000
28 April 1900	Chesterfield	H	2–1	Holt, Grundy	6,000

Pos	Team	Pld	W	D	L	GF	GA	GAv	Pts	Promotion or relegation
2	Bolton Wanderers (P)	34	22	8	4	79	25	3.160	52	Promotion to the First Division
3	Small Heath	34	20	6	8	78	38	2.053	46	
4	Newton Heath	34	20	4	10	63	27	2.333	44	
5	Leicester Fosse	34	17	9	8	53	36	1.472	43	
6	Grimsby Town	34	17	6	11	67	46	1.457	40	

Rules for classification: 1) Points; 2) Goal average; 3) Goals scored
(P) Promoted

== FA Cup ==
Date	Round	Opponents	H / A	Result F–A	Scorers	Attendance
28 October 1899	First round qualifying	South Shore	A	1–3	Jackson	3,000
