= 1898–99 Newton Heath F.C. season =

English football club season

Newton Heath
1898–99 season
- Secretary: A. H. Albut
- Stadium: Bank Street Ground
- Second Division: 4th
- FA Cup: First Round
- Top goalscorer: League: Joe Cassidy (19); All: Joe Cassidy (20)
- Highest home attendance: 20,000 vs Manchester City (10 September 1898); 20,000 vs New Brighton Tower (18 March 1899)
- Lowest home attendance: 2,000 vs Loughborough (22 October 1898); 2,000 vs Darwen (24 December 1898); 2,000 vs Gainsborough Trinity (31 December 1898)
- Average home league attendance: 7,389
Home colours	Away colours

The 1898–99 season was Newton Heath's seventh season in the Football League and their fifth in the Second Division. They finished fourth in the league, which was not enough to earn promotion back to the First Division. In the FA Cup, the Heathens managed to take Tottenham Hotspur to a replay back at Bank Street after a 1–1 draw at Northumberland Park, before losing 5–3 in the replay.

The club also entered teams in the Lancashire and Manchester Senior Cups in 1898–99, but little progress was made in either competition. The club received a bye to the third round of the Manchester Senior Cup, but lost 4–1 to Bury. It was a similar story in the Lancashire Cup, as they beat Darwen 5–0 in the first round before losing 6–1 to Blackburn Rovers in the second round.

== Second Division ==
=== Results ===
Date	Opponents	H / A	Result F–A	Scorers	Attendance
3 September 1898	Gainsborough Trinity	A	2–0	Bryant, Cassidy	2,000
10 September 1898	Manchester City	H	3–0	Boyd, Cassidy (2, 1 pen.)	20,000
17 September 1898	Glossop	A	2–1	Bryant, Cassidy	6,000
24 September 1898	Walsall	H	1–0	Gillespie	8,000
1 October 1898	Burton Swifts	A	1–5	Boyd	2,000
8 October 1898	Burslem Port Vale	H	2–1	Bryant, Cassidy	10,000
15 October 1898	Small Heath	A	1–4	Cassidy	5,000
22 October 1898	Loughborough	H	6–1	Brooks (2), Cassidy (2), Collinson (2)	2,000
5 November 1898	Grimsby Town	H	3–2	Brooks, Cassidy, Gillespie	5,000
12 November 1898	Barnsley	H	0–0		6,000
19 November 1898	New Brighton Tower	A	3–0	Collinson (2), Cunningham	5,000
26 November 1898	Lincoln City	H	1–0	Bryant	4,000
3 December 1898	Woolwich Arsenal	A	1–5	Collinson	6,000
10 December 1898	Blackpool	H	3–1	Cassidy, Collinson, Cunningham	5,000
17 December 1898	Leicester Fosse	A	0–1		8,000
24 December 1898	Darwen	H	9–0	Bryant (3), Cassidy (3), Gillespie (2), Radcliffe (o.g.)	2,000
26 December 1898	Manchester City	A	0–4		25,000
31 December 1898	Gainsborough Trinity	H	6–1	Collinson (2), Bryant, Boyd, Cartwright, Draycott	2,000
2 January 1899	Burton Swifts	H	2–2	Boyd, Cassidy	6,000
14 January 1899	Glossop	H	3–0	Cunningham, Erentz, Gillespie	12,000
21 January 1899	Walsall	A	0–2		3,000
4 February 1899	Burslem Port Vale	A	0–1		6,000
18 February 1899	Loughborough	A	1–0	Bryant	1,500
25 February 1899	Small Heath	H	2–0	Boyd, Roberts	12,000
4 March 1899	Grimsby Town	A	0–3		4,000
18 March 1899	New Brighton Tower	H	1–2	Cassidy	20,000
25 March 1899	Lincoln City	A	0–2		3,000
1 April 1899	Woolwich Arsenal	H	2–2	Bryant, Cassidy	5,000
3 April 1899	Blackpool	A	1–0	Cassidy	3,000
4 April 1899	Barnsley	A	2–0	Lee (2)	4,000
8 April 1899	Luton Town	A	1–0	Lee	1,500
12 April 1899	Luton Town	H	5–0	Cartwright, Cassidy, Gillespie, Lee, Morgan	3,000
15 April 1899	Leicester Fosse	H	2–2	Cassidy, Gillespie	7,000
22 April 1899	Darwen	A	1–1	Morgan	1,000

=== Table ===
Pos	Team	Pld	W	D	L	GF	GA	GAv	Pts	Promotion or relegation
2	Glossop North End (P)	34	20	6	8	76	38	2.000	46	Promotion to the First Division
3	Leicester Fosse	34	18	9	7	64	42	1.524	45	
4	Newton Heath	34	19	5	10	67	43	1.558	43	
5	New Brighton Tower	34	18	7	9	71	52	1.365	43	
6	Walsall	34	15	12	7	79	36	2.194	42	

Rules for classification: 1) Points; 2) Goal average; 3) Goals scored
(P) Promoted

== FA Cup ==
Date	Round	Opponents	H / A	Result F–A	Scorers	Attendance
28 January 1899	First Round	Tottenham Hotspur	A	1–1	Cassidy	13,721
1 February 1899	First Round; Replay	Tottenham Hotspur	H	3–5	Bryant (3)	6,000
