= 1897–98 Newton Heath F.C. season =

English football club season

Newton Heath
1897–98 season
- Secretary: A. H. Albut
- Stadium: Bank Street Ground
- Second Division: 4th
- FA Cup: Second Round
- Top goalscorer: League: Henry Boyd (22); All: Henry Boyd (22)
- Highest home attendance: 20,000 vs Manchester City (16 October 1897)
- Lowest home attendance: 2,000 vs Loughborough (29 March 1898)
- Average home league attendance: 6,647
Home colours	Away colours

The 1897–98 season was Newton Heath's sixth season in the Football League and their fourth in the Second Division. They finished fourth in the league, which was not enough to earn them a chance for promotion back to the First Division. In the FA Cup, the Heathens were knocked out by Liverpool in the Second Round, after beating Walsall in the First Round.

The club also entered teams in the Lancashire and Manchester Senior Cups in 1897–98. They reached the semi-finals of the Manchester Senior Cup before being beaten 2–1 by Manchester City in a replay, but they went two better in the Lancashire Senior Cup, beating Blackburn Rovers 2–1 in the final.

== Second Division ==
Date	Opponents	H / A	Result F–A	Scorers	Attendance
4 September 1897	Lincoln City	H	5–0	Boyd (3), Cassidy, Bryant	5,000
11 September 1897	Burton Swifts	A	4–0	Boyd (3), Cassidy	2,000
18 September 1897	Luton Town	H	1–2	Cassidy	8,000
25 September 1897	Blackpool	A	1–0	Smith	2,000
2 October 1897	Leicester Fosse	H	2–0	Boyd (2)	6,000
9 October 1897	Newcastle United	A	0–2		12,000
16 October 1897	Manchester City	H	1–1	Gillespie	20,000
23 October 1897	Small Heath	A	1–2	Bryant	6,000
30 October 1897	Walsall	H	6–0	Cassidy (2), Donaldson (2), Bryant, Gillespie	6,000
6 November 1897	Lincoln City	A	0–1		2,000
13 November 1897	Newcastle United	H	0–1		7,000
20 November 1897	Leicester Fosse	A	1–1	Wedge	6,000
27 November 1897	Grimsby Town	H	2–1	Bryant, own goal	5,000
11 December 1897	Walsall	A	1–1	Boyd	2,000
25 December 1897	Manchester City	A	1–0	Cassidy	16,000
27 December 1897	Gainsborough Trinity	A	1–2	Carman	3,000
1 January 1898	Burton Swifts	H	4–0	Boyd, Bryant, Carman, McNaught	6,000
8 January 1898	Woolwich Arsenal	A	1–5	Erentz	8,000
12 January 1898	Burnley	H	0–0		7,000
15 January 1898	Blackpool	H	4–0	Boyd (2), Cartwright, Cassidy	4,000
26 February 1898	Woolwich Arsenal	H	5–1	Bryant, Cassidy (2), Collinson, Ord (o.g.)	6,000
7 March 1898	Burnley	A	3–6	Collinson, Bryant (2)	3,000
19 March 1898	Darwen	A	3–2	Boyd (2), McNaught	2,000
21 March 1898	Luton Town	A	2–2	Boyd, Cassidy	2,000
29 March 1898	Loughborough	H	5–1	Boyd (3), Cassidy (2)	2,000
2 April 1898	Grimsby Town	A	3–1	Cassidy (2), Boyd	2,000
8 April 1898	Gainsborough Trinity	H	1–0	Cassidy	5,000
9 April 1898	Small Heath	H	3–1	Boyd, Gillespie, Morgan	4,000
16 April 1898	Loughborough	A	0–0		1,200
23 April 1898	Darwen	H	3–2	Collinson (2), Bryant	4,000

Pos	Team	Pld	W	D	L	GF	GA	GAv	Pts	Qualification or relegation
2	Newcastle United (O, P)	30	21	3	6	64	32	2.000	45	Qualification for test matches
3	Manchester City	30	15	9	6	66	36	1.833	39	
4	Newton Heath	30	16	6	8	64	35	1.829	38	
5	Woolwich Arsenal	30	16	5	9	69	49	1.408	37	
6	Small Heath	30	16	4	10	58	50	1.160	36	

Rules for classification: 1) Points; 2) Goal average; 3) Goals scored
(O) Play-off winners; (P) Promoted

== FA Cup ==
Date	Round	Opponents	H / A	Result F–A	Scorers	Attendance
29 January 1898	First Round	Walsall	H	1–0	Pears (o.g.)	6,000
12 February 1898	Second Round	Liverpool	H	0–0		12,000
16 February 1898	Second Round; Replay	Liverpool	A	1–2	Jimmy Collinson	6,000
