= 1895–96 Newton Heath F.C. season =

English football club season

Newton Heath
1895–96 season
- Secretary: A. H. Albut
- Stadium: Bank Street Ground
- Second Division: 6th
- FA Cup: Second Round
- Top goalscorer: League: Joe Cassidy (16); All: Joe Cassidy (16)
- Highest home attendance: 20,000 vs Derby County (15 February 1896)
- Lowest home attendance: 1,000 vs Leicester Fosse (3 February 1896); 1,000 vs Burton Wanderers (29 February 1896); 1,000 vs Darwen (3 April 1896)
- Average home league attendance: 6,529
Home colours	Away colours

The 1895–96 season was Newton Heath's fourth season in the Football League and their second in the Second Division. They finished sixth in the league, which was not enough to earn a chance for promotion back to the First Division. In the FA Cup, the Heathens were knocked out in the Second Round, losing 5–1 in a replay against Derby County after vanquishing Kettering Town in the First Round.

The club also entered teams in the Lancashire and Manchester Senior Cups in 1895–96. They were knocked out of the Lancashire Cup in the first round, losing 2–1 at home to Bury. In the Manchester Cup, they received a bye to the third round, but were immediately knocked out by Fairfield, losing 5–2.

== Football League Second Division ==
Date	Opponents	H / A	Result F–A	Scorers	Attendance
7 September 1895	Crewe Alexandra	H	5–0	Cassidy (2), Aitken, Kennedy, Smith	6,000
14 September 1895	Loughborough	A	3–3	Cassidy (2), McNaught	3,000
21 September 1895	Burton Swifts	H	5–0	Donaldson (2), Cassidy (2), Kennedy	9,000
28 September 1895	Crewe Alexandra	A	2–0	Smith (2)	2,000
5 October 1895	Manchester City	H	1–1	Clarkin	12,000
12 October 1895	Liverpool	A	1–7	Cassidy	7,000
19 October 1895	Newcastle United	H	2–1	Cassidy, Peters	8,000
26 October 1895	Newcastle United	A	1–2	Kennedy	8,000
2 November 1895	Liverpool	H	5–2	Peters (3), Clarkin, Smith	10,000
9 November 1895	Woolwich Arsenal	A	1–2	Cassidy	9,000
16 November 1895	Lincoln City	H	5–5	Clarkin (2), Cassidy, Collinson, Peters	8,000
23 November 1895	Notts County	A	2–0	Cassidy, Kennedy	3,000
30 November 1895	Woolwich Arsenal	H	5–1	Cartwright (2), Clarkin, Kennedy, Peters	6,000
7 December 1895	Manchester City	A	1–2	Cassidy	18,000
14 December 1895	Notts County	H	3–0	Cassidy, Clarkin, Donaldson	3,000
21 December 1895	Darwen	A	0–3		3,000
1 January 1896	Grimsby Town	H	3–2	Cassidy (3, 1 pen)	8,000
4 January 1896	Leicester Fosse	A	0–3		7,000
11 January 1896	Rotherham Town	H	3–0	Donaldson (2), Stephenson	3,000
3 February 1896	Leicester Fosse	H	2–0	Kennedy, Smith	1,000
8 February 1896	Burton Swifts	A	1–4	Vance	2,000
29 February 1896	Burton Wanderers	H	1–2	McNaught	1,000
7 March 1896	Rotherham Town	A	3–2	Donaldson, Kennedy, Smith	1,500
14 March 1896	Grimsby Town	A	2–4	Kennedy, Smith	2,000
18 March 1896	Burton Wanderers	A	1–5	Dow	2,000
23 March 1896	Burslem Port Vale	A	0–3		3,000
3 April 1896	Darwen	H	4–0	Kennedy, McNaught	1,000
4 April 1896	Loughborough	H	2–0	Donaldson, Smith	4,000
6 April 1896	Burslem Port Vale	H	2–1	Clarkin, Smith	5,000
11 April 1896	Lincoln City	A	0–2		2,000

Pos	Team	Pld	W	D	L	GF	GA	GAv	Pts
4	Burton Wanderers	30	19	4	7	69	40	1.725	42
5	Newcastle United	30	16	2	12	73	50	1.460	34
6	Newton Heath	30	15	3	12	66	57	1.158	33
7	Woolwich Arsenal	30	14	4	12	58	42	1.381	32
8	Leicester Fosse	30	14	4	12	57	44	1.295	32

Rules for classification: 1) Points; 2) Goal average; 3) Goals scored

== FA Cup ==
Date	Round	Opponents	H / A	Result F–A	Scorers	Attendance
1 February 1896	Round 1	Kettering Town	H	2–1	Donaldson, Smith	6,000
15 February 1896	Round 2	Derby County	H	1–1	Kennedy	20,000
19 February 1896	Round 2 Replay	Derby County	A	1–5	Donaldson	6,000
