= 1894–95 Newton Heath F.C. season =

English football club season

Newton Heath
1894–95 season
- Secretary: A. H. Albut
- Stadium: Bank Street Ground
- Second Division: 3rd
- FA Cup: First Round
- Top goalscorer: League: Dick Smith (19); All: Dick Smith (20)
- Highest home attendance: 15,000 vs Bury (12 April 1895)
- Lowest home attendance: 2,000 vs Lincoln City (22 December 1894)
- Average home league attendance: 6,563
Home colours	Away colours

The 1894–95 season was Newton Heath's third season in the Football League and their first outside the top flight. They finished third in the Second Division, earning the right to play in a Test match against Stoke City in order to regain their top-flight status. They lost the match, which was played at Vale Park, Burslem, 3–0 and remained in the Second Division. In the FA Cup, the Heathens were knocked out in the First Round after losing 3–2 to Stoke City.

A league match against Walsall Town Swifts was played on 9 March, with Newton Heath winning 14–0. However, Walsall had complained about the state of the pitch before the game, and an extra layer of sand was added prior to kick-off. Walsall's protest was upheld by The Football League, the result was nullified and the match was replayed on 9 April; Newton Heath won the replay 9–0.

The club also entered teams in the Lancashire and Manchester Senior Cups in 1894–95, but were knocked out in the first round of both competitions. As in the previous season, a Newton Heath team also competed in the Lancashire Palatine League, along with Bury and Liverpool. They beat Liverpool at home, but drew at Anfield and lost both matches against Bury. It was to be Newton Heath's last entry in the Palatine League.

== Football League Second Division ==
Date	Opponents	H / A	Result F–A	Scorers	Attendance
8 September 1894	Burton Wanderers	A	0–1		3,000
15 September 1894	Crewe Alexandra	H	6–1	Dow (2), Smith (2), Clarkin, McCartney	6,000
22 September 1894	Leicester Fosse	A	3–2	Dow (2), Smith	6,000
6 October 1894	Darwen	A	1–1	Donaldson	6,000
13 October 1894	Woolwich Arsenal	H	3–3	Donaldson (2), Clarkin	4,000
20 October 1894	Burton Swifts	A	2–1	Donaldson (2)	5,000
27 October 1894	Leicester Fosse	H	2–2	McNaught, Smith	3,000
3 November 1894	Manchester City	A	5–2	Smith (4), Clarkin	14,000
10 November 1894	Rotherham Town	H	3–2	Davidson, Donaldson, Peters	4,000
17 November 1894	Grimsby Town	A	1–2	Clarkin	3,000
24 November 1894	Darwen	H	1–1	Donaldson	5,000
1 December 1894	Crewe Alexandra	A	2–0	Clarkin, Smith	600
8 December 1894	Burton Swifts	H	5–1	Peters (2), Smith (2), Dow	4,000
15 December 1894	Notts County	A	1–1	Donaldson	3,000
22 December 1894	Lincoln City	H	3–0	Donaldson, Millar, Smith	2,000
24 December 1894	Burslem Port Vale	A	5–2	Clarkin, Donaldson, McNaught, Millar, Smith	1,000
26 December 1894	Walsall Town Swifts	A	2–1	Millar, Stewart	1,000
29 December 1894	Lincoln City	A	0–3		3,000
1 January 1895	Burslem Port Vale	H	3–0	Millar (2), Rothwell	5,000
5 January 1895	Manchester City	H	4–1	Clarkin (2), Donaldson, Smith	12,000
12 January 1895	Rotherham Town	A	1–2	Erentz	2,000
2 March 1895	Burton Wanderers	H	1–1	Peters	6,000
23 March 1895	Grimsby Town	H	2–0	Cassidy (2)	9,000
30 March 1895	Woolwich Arsenal	A	2–3	Clarkin, Donaldson	6,000
3 April 1895	Walsall Town Swifts	H	9–0	Cassidy (2), Donaldson (2), Peters (2), Smith (2), Clarkin	6,000
6 April 1895	Newcastle United	H	5–1	Cassidy (2), Smith (2), McDermidd (o.g.)	5,000
12 April 1895	Bury	H	2–2	Cassidy, Donaldson	15,000
13 April 1895	Newcastle United	A	0–3		4,000
15 April 1895	Bury	A	1–2	Peters	10,000
20 April 1895	Notts County	H	3–3	Cassidy, Clarkin, Smith	4,000

Pos	Team	Pld	W	D	L	GF	GA	GAv	Pts	Qualification or relegation
1	Bury (C, O, P)	30	23	2	5	78	33	2.364	48	Qualification for test matches
2	Notts County	30	17	5	8	75	45	1.667	39	Qualification for test matches
3	Newton Heath	30	15	8	7	78	44	1.773	38	Qualification for test matches
4	Leicester Fosse	30	15	8	7	72	53	1.358	38	
5	Grimsby Town	30	18	1	11	79	52	1.519	37	

Rules for classification: 1) Points; 2) Goal average; 3) Goals scored
(C) Champions; (O) Play-off winners; (P) Promoted

=== Test match ===
Date	Opponents	H / A	Result F–A	Scorers	Attendance
27 April 1895	Stoke City	N	0–3		10,000

== FA Cup ==
Date	Round	Opponents	H / A	Result F–A	Scorers	Attendance
2 February 1895	Round 1	Stoke City	H	2–3	Smith, Peters	7,000
