= 1896–97 Newton Heath F.C. season =

English football club season

Newton Heath
1896–97 season
- Secretary: A. H. Albut
- Stadium: Bank Street
- Second Division: 2nd
- FA Cup: Third round
- Top goalscorer: League: Joe Cassidy (17); All: Joe Cassidy (25)
- Highest home attendance: 18,000 vs Manchester City (25 December 1896)
- Lowest home attendance: 3,000 vs Burton Swifts (9 January 1897); 3,000 vs Darwen (2 March 1897); 3,000 vs Woolwich Arsenal (22 March 1897)
- Average home league attendance: 6,636
Home colours	Away colours

The 1896–97 season was Newton Heath's fifth season in the Football League and their third in the Second Division. They finished second in the league, which earned them a chance for promotion back to the First Division. United played two Test matches against each of the bottom two teams from the First Division, but although they beat Burnley at Bank Street, they were unable to overcome Sunderland and remained in the Second Division. In the FA Cup, the Heathens managed to reach the third round, before losing 2–0 to Derby County for the second year in a row.

The club also entered teams in the Lancashire and Manchester Senior Cups in 1896–97. They were knocked out of the Lancashire Cup in the second round, losing 2–1 away to Burnley. In the Manchester Cup, they received a bye to the third round, where they beat Manchester City, before losing 2–0 to Bury in the semi-finals.

== Second Division ==
Date	Opponents	H / A	Result F–A	Scorers	Attendance
1 September 1896	Gainsborough Trinity	H	2–0	McNaught (2)	4,000
5 September 1896	Burton Swifts	A	5–3	Brown, Bryant, Cassidy, Draycott, McNaught	3,000
7 September 1896	Walsall	H	2–0	Cassidy, Donaldson	7,000
12 September 1896	Lincoln City	H	3–1	Cassidy (2), Donaldson	2,000
19 September 1896	Grimsby Town	A	0–2		3,000
21 September 1896	Walsall	A	3–2	Brown, Draycott, McNaught	7,000
26 September 1896	Newcastle United	H	4–0	Cassidy (3), Donaldson	7,000
3 October 1896	Manchester City	A	0–0		20,000
10 October 1896	Small Heath	H	1–1	Draycott	7,000
17 October 1896	Blackpool	A	2–4	Bryant, Draycott	5,000
21 October 1896	Gainsborough Trinity	A	0–2		4,000
24 October 1896	Burton Wanderers	H	3–0	Cassidy (3)	4,000
7 November 1896	Grimsby Town	H	4–2	Cassidy (2), Donaldson, Jenkyns	5,000
28 November 1896	Small Heath	A	0–1		4,000
19 December 1896	Notts County	A	0–3		5,000
25 December 1896	Manchester City	H	2–1	Donaldson, Smith	18,000
26 December 1896	Blackpool	H	2–0	Cassidy (2)	9,000
28 December 1896	Leicester Fosse	A	0–1		8,000
1 January 1897	Newcastle United	A	0–2		17,000
9 January 1897	Burton Swifts	H	1–1	Donaldson	3,000
6 February 1897	Loughborough	H	6–0	Smith (2), Boyd, Donaldson, Draycott, Jenkyns	5,000
20 February 1897	Leicester Fosse	H	2–1	Boyd, Donaldson	8,000
2 March 1897	Darwen	H	3–1	Cassidy (2), Boyd	3,000
13 March 1897	Darwen	A	2–0	Cassidy, Gillespie	2,000
20 March 1897	Burton Wanderers	A	2–1	Gillespie, Lowe (o.g.)	3,000
22 March 1897	Woolwich Arsenal	H	1–1	Boyd	3,000
27 March 1897	Notts County	H	1–1	Bryant	10,000
1 April 1897	Lincoln City	A	3–1	Jenkyns (3)	1,000
3 April 1897	Woolwich Arsenal	A	2–0	Boyd, Donaldson	6,000
10 April 1897	Loughborough	A	0–2		3,000

Pos	Team	Pld	W	D	L	GF	GA	GAv	Pts	Qualification or relegation
1	Notts County (C, O, P)	30	19	4	7	92	43	2.140	42	Qualification for test matches
2	Newton Heath	30	17	5	8	56	34	1.647	39	Qualification for test matches
3	Grimsby Town	30	17	4	9	66	45	1.467	38	
4	Small Heath	30	16	5	9	69	47	1.468	37	
5	Newcastle United	30	17	1	12	56	52	1.077	35	

Rules for classification: 1) Points; 2) Goal average; 3) Goals scored
(C) Champions; (O) Play-off winners; (P) Promoted

=== Test matches ===
Date	Opponents	H / A	Result F–A	Scorers	Attendance
19 April 1897	Burnley	A	0–2		10,000
21 April 1897	Burnley	H	2–0	Boyd, Jenkyns	7,000
24 April 1897	Sunderland	H	1–1	Boyd	18,000
26 April 1897	Sunderland	A	0–2		6,000

== FA Cup ==
Date	Round	Opponents	H / A	Result F–A	Scorers	Attendance
12 December 1896	First round qualifying	West Manchester	H	7–0	Cassidy (2), Gillespie (2), Rothwell (2), Bryant	6,000
2 January 1897	Second round qualifying	Nelson	H	3–0	Cassidy, Donaldson, Gillespie	5,000
15 January 1897	Third round qualifying	Blackpool	H	2–2	Gillespie, Donaldson	1,500
20 January 1897	Third round qualifying replay	Blackpool	A	2–1	Cassidy, Boyd	1,500
30 January 1897	First round	Kettering Town	H	5–1	Cassidy (3), Donaldson (2)	5,000
13 February 1897	Second round	Southampton St. Mary's	A	1–1	Donaldson	8,000
17 February 1897	Second round replay	Southampton St. Mary's	H	3–1	Bryant (2), Cassidy	7,000
27 February 1897	Third round	Derby County	A	0–2		12,000
