= 1891–92 Newton Heath LYR F.C. season =

English football club season

Newton Heath LYR
1891–92 season
- Manager: A. H. Albut
- Stadium: North Road Ground
- Football Alliance: 2nd
- FA Cup: Fourth round qualifying
- Lancashire Senior Cup: First round
- Manchester Senior Cup: Semi-finals
- Top goalscorer: League: Bob Donaldson (20); All: Alf Farman (22)
- Highest home attendance: 12,000 vs Nottingham Forest (1 January 1892)
- Lowest home attendance: 3,000 vs Crewe Alexandra (30 January 1892)
Home colours

The 1891–92 season was Newton Heath LYR's third and final season in the Football Alliance. They applied for election to the Football League towards the end of the season, and, due to their second-place finish in the Alliance, the League accepted the application. The club also took part in the FA Cup, reaching the Fourth Qualifying Round; the Lancashire Senior Cup, in which they were knocked out by Bury in the first round; and the Manchester Senior Cup, in which they reached the semi-finals before being knocked out by Bolton Wanderers.

== Football Alliance ==
Date	Opponents	H / A	Result F–A	Scorers	Attendance
12 September 1891	Burton Swifts	A	2–3	Donaldson, Farman	2,000
19 September 1891	Bootle	H	4–0	Farman, Edge (3)	5,000
26 September 1891	Birmingham St George's	A	3–1	Donaldson (2), Stewart	300
10 October 1891	Ardwick	H	3–1	Donaldson, Farman (2)	4,000
17 October 1891	Grimsby Town	A	2–2	Donaldson (2)	3,000
31 October 1891	Burton Swifts	H	3–1	J. Doughty, Edge, Farman	4,000
7 November 1891	Crewe Alexandra	A	2–0	Donaldson, Stafford (o.g.)	3,000
21 November 1891	Lincoln City	H	10–1	Donaldson (3), Hood (2), Stewart (2), Sneddon, Farman, Bates (o.g.)	6,000
28 November 1891	Walsall Town Swifts	A	4–1	Farman, Donaldson (3)	2,500
12 December 1891	Sheffield Wednesday	A	4–2	Farman (2), Owen, Sneddon	4,000
19 December 1891	Ardwick	A	2–2	Farman (2)	13,000
26 December 1891	Small Heath	H	3–3	Edge (2), Farman	7,000
1 January 1892	Nottingham Forest	H	1–1	Edge	12,000
9 January 1892	Bootle	A	1–1	Hood	2,000
30 January 1892	Crewe Alexandra	H	5–3	Donaldson (3), Sneddon, R. Doughty	3,000
20 February 1892	Sheffield Wednesday	H	1–1	Hood	6,000
27 February 1892	Small Heath	A	2–3	Farman, Sneddon	3,000
5 March 1892	Walsall Town Swifts	H	5–0	Farman (2), Sneddon (2), McFarlane	3,500
19 March 1892	Nottingham Forest	A	0–3		9,000
26 March 1892	Grimsby Town	H	3–3	Donaldson (2), Farman	6,000
2 April 1892	Lincoln City	A	6–1	Sneddon, Mathieson, unknown, unknown, unknown, unknown	2,000
9 April 1892	Birmingham St George's	H	3–0	Donaldson (2), Hood	4,000

Pos	Team	Pld	W	D	L	GF	GA	GAv	Pts	Qualification or relegation
1	Nottingham Forest (C, P)	22	14	5	3	59	22	2.682	33	Elected to the Football League First Division
2	Newton Heath (P)	22	12	7	3	69	33	2.091	31	Elected to the Football League First Division
3	Small Heath (E)	22	12	5	5	53	36	1.472	29	Elected to the Football League Second Division
4	The Wednesday (P)	22	12	4	6	65	35	1.857	28	Elected to the Football League First Division
5	Burton Swifts (E)	22	12	2	8	54	52	1.038	26	Elected to the Football League Second Division

Rules for classification: 1) points; 2) goal average.
(C) Champions; (E) Elected to the Football League Second Division; (P) Promoted

== FA Cup ==
Date	Round	Opponents	H / A	Result F–A	Scorers	Attendance
3 October 1891	First round qualifying	Ardwick	H	5–1	Farman (2), Edge, Sneddon, R. Doughty	11,000
24 October 1891	Second round qualifying	Heywood	H	3–2	Owen, Farman, Henrys	
14 November 1891	Third round qualifying	South Shore	A	2–0	J. Doughty, Farman	2,000
5 December 1891	Fourth round qualifying	Blackpool	H	3–4	Edge (2), Farman	4,000

== Lancashire Senior Cup ==
Date	Round	Opponents	H / A	Result F–A	Scorers	Attendance
6 February 1892	Round 1	Bury	H	2–3	Sneddon, Farman	6,000

== Manchester Senior Cup ==
Date	Round	Opponents	H / A	Result F–A	Scorers	Attendance
13 February 1892	Round 3	West Manchester	H	3–1	Stewart, Donaldson, Sneddon	
12 March 1892	Semi-final	Bolton Wanderers	N	1–3	Edge	
