= 1901–02 Newton Heath F.C. season =

English football club season

Newton Heath
1901–02 season
- President: William Healey
- Secretary: James West
- Stadium: Bank Street Ground
- Second Division: 15th place
- FA Cup: Intermediate Round
- Top goalscorer: League: Stephen Preston (11); All: Stephen Preston (11)
- Highest home attendance: 13,000 vs West Bromwich Albion (9 November 1901)
- Lowest home attendance: 500 vs Burton United (21 April 1902)
- Average home league attendance: 4,389
Home colours	Away colours

The 1901–02 season was Newton Heath's 10th season in the Football League and their 8th in the Second Division. They finished 15th place in the league, avoiding relegation by only five points. In the FA Cup, the Heathens were knocked out by Lincoln City, losing 2–1 in the Intermediate Round.

The club also entered teams in the Lancashire and Manchester Senior Cups in 1901–02. They only managed to reach the second round of the Lancashire Cup, before losing 5–0 to Southport Central, but the real success came in the Manchester Cup, in which they beat Bolton Wanderers after a replay in the semi-final, before beating Manchester City 2–1 in the final.

The season marked also the final season for the club under its original name Newton Heath. The club had been struggling financially during the season, and were taken to court by their president, William Healey, over a sum of £242 17s 10d owed to him by the club in January 1902. Unable to pay, as they were £2,670 in debt, the club was declared bankrupt. Two months later, club captain Harry Stafford managed to enlist the help of Manchester brewer John Henry Davies, who, in conjunction with three other local businessmen, invested a total of £1,000 in the club. Davies was installed as club president and the club was renamed "Manchester United".

== Second Division ==
Date	Opponents	H / A	Result F–A	Scorers	Attendance
7 September 1901	Gainsborough Trinity	H	3–0	Preston (2), Lappin	10,000
14 September 1901	Middlesbrough	A	0–5		12,000
21 September 1901	Bristol City	H	1–0	Griffiths	6,000
28 September 1901	Blackpool	A	4–2	Preston (2), Schofield, own goal	4,000
5 October 1901	Stockport County	H	3–3	Schofield, Smith, Preston	5,000
12 October 1901	Burton United	A	0–0		3,000
19 October 1901	Glossop	A	0–0		5,000
26 October 1901	Doncaster Rovers	H	6–0	Coupar (2), Schofield, Griffiths, Preston, own goal	7,000
9 November 1901	West Bromwich Albion	H	1–2	Fisher	13,000
16 November 1901	Woolwich Arsenal	A	0–2		3,000
23 November 1901	Barnsley	H	1–0	Griffiths	4,000
30 November 1901	Leicester Fosse	A	2–3	Cartwright (2)	4,000
7 December 1901	Preston North End	A	1–5	Preston	3,000
21 December 1901	Burslem Port Vale	H	1–0	Richards	3,000
26 December 1901	Lincoln City	A	0–2		4,000
1 January 1902	Preston North End	H	0–2		10,000
4 January 1902	Gainsborough Trinity	A	1–1	Lappin	2,000
18 January 1902	Bristol City	A	0–4		6,000
25 January 1902	Blackpool	H	0–1		3,000
1 February 1902	Stockport County	A	0–1		3,000
11 February 1902	Burnley	H	2–0	Lappin, Preston	1,000
15 February 1902	Glossop	H	1–0	Erentz	4,000
22 February 1902	Doncaster Rovers	A	0–4		3,000
1 March 1902	Lincoln City	H	0–0		6,000
8 March 1902	West Bromwich Albion	A	0–4		8,000
15 March 1902	Woolwich Arsenal	H	0–1		3,000
17 March 1902	Chesterfield	A	0–3		2,000
22 March 1902	Barnsley	A	2–3	Cartwright, Higson	2,500
28 March 1902	Burnley	A	0–1		3,000
29 March 1902	Leicester Fosse	H	2–0	Griffiths, Hayes	2,000
7 April 1902	Middlesbrough	H	1–2	Erentz (pen.)	2,000
19 April 1902	Burslem Port Vale	A	1–1	Coupar	2,000
21 April 1902	Burton United	H	3–1	Cartwright, Griffiths, Preston	500
23 April 1902	Chesterfield	H	2–0	Coupar, Preston	2,000

Pos	Team	Pld	W	D	L	GF	GA	GAv	Pts	Promotion or relegation
13	Blackpool	34	11	7	16	40	56	0.714	29	
14	Leicester Fosse	34	12	5	17	38	56	0.679	29	
15	Newton Heath	34	11	6	17	38	53	0.717	28	
16	Chesterfield Town	34	11	6	17	47	68	0.691	28	Re-elected
17	Stockport County	34	8	7	19	36	72	0.500	23	Re-elected

Rules for classification: 1) Points; 2) Goal average; 3) Goals scored

== FA Cup ==
Date	Round	Opponents	H / A	Result F–A	Scorers	Attendance
14 December 1901	Intermediate Round	Lincoln City	H	1–2	Fisher	4,000
