= George Perrins =

English footballer

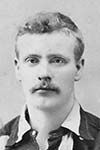

Personal information
- Date of birth: 24 February 1873
- Place of birth: Birmingham, England
- Date of death: 1947 (aged 73–74)
- Positions: Right-back; right-half

Senior career*
Years	Team	Apps	(Gls)
?–1892	Birmingham St George's	?	(?)
1892–1896	Newton Heath	96	(0)
1896–1898	Luton Town	6	(0)
1898–1901	Chatham Town	?	(?)
1901–1902	Stockport County	29	(0)
- * Club domestic league appearances and goals

George Perrins (24 February 1873 – 1947) was an English footballer. His regular position was at half back. He was born in Birmingham. He played for Birmingham St George's, Newton Heath, Luton Town, Chatham Town, and Stockport County.

== Career ==
Perrins made his Newton Heath debut on 3 September 1892 in their first ever league match, playing at right half in a 4–3 defeat by Blackburn Rovers. He established himself as Newton Heath's regular right-half, position he occupied for three seasons. 1895–96 season was Perrins' last as a Heathen – after one of his appearances it was reported that "he was weak and no one understood what he wanted to do with the ball. He caressed it and dribbled when he should rather have made sure to get rid of it."

He also played twice as an emergency goalkeeper in Second Division matches against Burton Wanderers, when Hugh Douglas had just been transferred to Derby County and Joe Ridgway was struggling with a broken finger. Both games were lost by Newton Heath 2–1 and 5–1, respectively. Perrins managed to make 102 appearances for Newton Heath, becoming just second player in club's history to achieve 100 appearances after Fred Erentz.

== Career statistics ==
Club	Season	Division	League		National Cup		Other		Total	
Club	Season	Division	Apps	Goals	Apps	Goals	Apps	Goals	Apps	Goals
Newton Heath	1892–93	First Division	30	0	1	0	–		31	0
Newton Heath	1893–94	First Division	28	0	3	0	–		31	0
Newton Heath	1894–95	Second Division	26	0	1	0	–		27	0
Newton Heath	1895–96	Second Division	12	0	1	0	–		13	0
Newton Heath	Total		96	0	6	0	–		102	0
Luton Town	1896–97	– (Note: Luton Town left the Southern League in 1896 to become founder members of the United League.)	–		–		6 (Note: Appearances in the United League.)	0	6	0
Luton Town	1897–98	Second Division (Note: Luton Town were elected to the Football League Second Division. They continued to field a second side in the United League for two more seasons.)	6	0	–		7	1	13	1
Luton Town	Total		6	0	–		13	1	19	1
Stockport County	1901–02	Second Division	29	0	3	0	–		32	0
Career total			131	0	9	0	13	1	153	1
