= 1889–90 Newton Heath LYR F.C. season =

English football club season

Newton Heath LYR
1889–90 season
- Manager: A. H. Albut
- Stadium: North Road Ground
- Football Alliance: 8th
- FA Cup: First Round
- Lancashire Senior Cup: First Round
- Manchester Cup: Winners
- Top goalscorer: League: Willie Stewart (10); All: Willie Stewart (11)
- Highest home attendance: 5,000 vs Darwen (29 March 1890)
- Lowest home attendance: 1,000 vs Walsall Town Swifts (21 April 1890)
Home colours

The 1889–90 season was Newton Heath LYR's first season in the Football Alliance; they finished in 8th position. The club also took part in the FA Cup and the Lancashire Senior Cup, failing to get past the First Round in both competitions, as well as the Manchester and District Challenge Cup, in which they came out winners.

== Football Alliance ==
Date	Opponents	H / A	Result F–A	Scorers	Attendance
21 September 1889	Sunderland Albion	H	4–1	Wilson, J. Doughty, Stewart, Tait	3,000
23 September 1889	Bootle	A	1–4	Tait	3,000
28 September 1889	Crewe Alexandra	A	2–2	Stewart, Osborne (o.g.)	2,000
19 October 1889	Walsall Town Swifts	A	0–4		600
26 October 1889	Birmingham St George's	A	1–5	J. Doughty	500
9 November 1889	Long Eaton Rangers	H	3–0	J. Doughty (2), Farman	2,500
30 November 1889	The Wednesday	A	1–3	J. Doughty	5,000
7 December 1889	Bootle	H	3–0	J. Doughty, Farman, Stewart	4,000
21 December 1889	Walsall Town Swifts	H	3–0	J. Doughty, Jones (o.g.), Farman	1,000
28 December 1889	Darwen	A	1–4	G. Owen	5,000
4 January 1890	Grimsby Town	H	4–1	Craig (2), Wilson, J. Doughty	4,000
25 January 1890	Sunderland Albion	A	0–2		4,000
8 February 1890	Grimsby Town	A	0–7		2,400
15 February 1890	Nottingham Forest	A	3–1	Stewart (2), Wilson	800
1 March 1890	Crewe Alexandra	H	1–2	G. Owen	2,000
15 March 1890	Small Heath	A	1–1	Wilson	2,000
22 March 1890	Long Eaton Rangers	A	3–1	Wilson (2), Farman	2,000
29 March 1890	Darwen	H	2–1	Davies, Stewart	5,000
5 April 1890	Nottingham Forest	H	0–1		4,000
7 April 1890	Small Heath	H	9–1	Stewart (3), J. Doughty (2), Craig, R. Doughty, Farman, Wilson	4,000
14 April 1890	Grimsby Town	H	0–1		3,000
19 April 1890	Birmingham St George's	H	2–1	Craig, J. Doughty	2,500
21 April 1890	Walsall Town Swifts	H	2–1	Davies, Stewart	1,000
26 April 1890	The Wednesday	H	1–2	Craig	4,000

Pos	Team	Pld	W	D	L	GF	GA	GAv	Pts
6	Darwen	22	10	2	10	70	75	0.933	22
7	Birmingham St George's	21	9	3	9	62	49	1.265	21 (Note: Sunderland Albion's point total includes two points awarded after Birmingham St George's refused to fulfil a fixture against them which had been ordered to be replayed by the management committee.)
8	Newton Heath LYR	22	9	2	11	40	44	0.909	20
9	Walsall Town Swifts	22	8	3	11	44	59	0.746	19
10	Small Heath	22	6	5	11	44	67	0.657	17

Rules for classification: 1) points; 2) goal average.

== FA Cup ==
Date	Round	Opponents	H / A	Result F–A	Scorers	Attendance
18 January 1890	Round 1	Preston North End	A	1–6	Craig	7,900

== Lancashire Senior Cup ==
Date	Round	Opponents	H / A	Result F–A	Scorers	Attendance
2 November 1889	Round 1	Halliwell	A	1–2	Stewart	2,000

== Manchester and District Challenge Cup ==
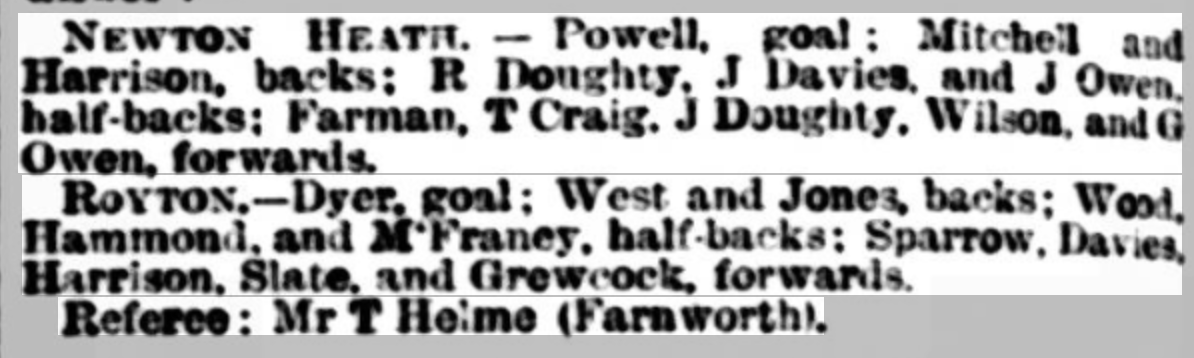
Line-ups for the 1890 Manchester Senior Cup Final

Date	Round	Opponents	H / A	Result F–A	Scorers	Attendance
12 April 1890	Semi-final	Denton	Hyde Road	4–1	Farman (2), Stewart, G. Owen	4,000
3 May 1890	Final	Royton	Brooke's Bar	5–2	Craig (3), G. Owen, Farman	4,000

== Squad statistics ==
Pos.	Name	Alliance		FA Cup		Total	
Pos.	Name	Apps	Goals	Apps	Goals	Apps	Goals
GK	(England) Tom Hay	15	0	1	0	16	0
GK	(England) James Pedley	1	0	0	0	1	0
FB	(England) Charlie Harrison	9	0	1	0	10	0
FB	(Scotland) Andrew Mitchell	19	0	0	0	19	0
FB	(Wales) Jack Powell	17	0	1	0	18	0
HB	(Wales) Tom Burke	5	0	0	0	5	0
HB	(Wales) Joe Davies	21	2	1	0	22	2
HB	G. Felton	5	0	0	0	5	0
HB	(Wales) Jack Owen	18	0	1	0	19	0
FW	T. Craig	11	3	1	1	12	4
FW	(Wales) Jack Doughty	22	9	1	0	23	9
FW	(Wales) Roger Doughty	20	1	1	0	21	1
FW	(England) Alf Farman	17	4	1	0	18	4
FW	(England) James Gotheridge	5	0	0	0	5	0
FW	(Wales) George Owen	12	2	1	0	13	2
FW	(Scotland) Willie Stewart	19	10	0	0	19	10
FW	(Scotland) William Tait	7	2	0	0	7	2
FW	(England) Edgar Wilson	19	6	1	0	20	6
