= 1893–94 Newton Heath F.C. season =

English football club season

Newton Heath
1893–94 season
- Secretary: A. H. Albut
- Stadium: Bank Street Ground
- First Division: 16th
- FA Cup: Second Round
- Top goalscorer: League: Alf Farman (8); All: Bob Donaldson (10)
- Highest home attendance: 18,000 vs Blackburn Rovers (10 February 1894)
- Lowest home attendance: 4,000 vs Preston North End (14 April 1894)
- Average home league attendance: 8,000
Home colours

The 1893–94 season was Newton Heath's second season in the Football League. They finished last in the First Division for the second consecutive season, meaning that they faced a Test match against Liverpool in order to retain their top-flight status. They lost the match, which was played at Ewood Park, Blackburn, 2–0 and were relegated to the Second Division. In the FA Cup, the Heathens managed to reach the Second Round before being knocked out by Blackburn Rovers, losing 5–1 in a replay.

The club also entered teams in the Lancashire and Manchester Senior Cups in 1893–94, but were knocked out in the first round of both competitions. In the latter half of the season, a Newton Heath team also competed in the County Palatine League in an attempt to add more league fixtures to the calendar. However, the experiment was unsuccessful, as the team lost four of their eight games.

== Football League First Division ==
Date	Opponents	H / A	Result F–A	Scorers	Attendance
2 September 1893	Burnley	H	3–2	Farman (3)	10,000
9 September 1893	West Bromwich Albion	A	1–3	Donaldson	4,500
16 September 1893	Sheffield Wednesday	A	1–0	Farman	7,000
23 September 1893	Nottingham Forest	H	1–1	Donaldson	10,000
30 September 1893	Darwen	A	0–1		4,000
7 October 1893	Derby County	A	0–2		7,000
14 October 1893	West Bromwich Albion	H	4–1	Peden (2), Donaldson, Erentz	8,000
21 October 1893	Burnley	A	1–4	Hood	7,000
28 October 1893	Wolverhampton Wanderers	A	0–2		4,000
4 November 1893	Darwen	H	0–1		8,000
11 November 1893	Wolverhampton Wanderers	H	1–0	Davidson	5,000
25 November 1893	Sheffield United	A	1–3	Fitzsimmons	2,000
2 December 1893	Everton	H	0–3		6,000
6 December 1893	Sunderland	A	1–4	Campbell	5,000
9 December 1893	Bolton Wanderers	A	0–2		5,000
16 December 1893	Aston Villa	H	1–3	Peden	8,000
23 December 1893	Preston North End	A	0–2		5,000
6 January 1894	Everton	A	0–2		8,000
13 January 1894	Sheffield Wednesday	H	1–2	Peden	9,000
3 February 1894	Aston Villa	A	1–5	Mathieson	5,000
3 March 1894	Sunderland	H	2–4	McNaught, Peden	10,000
10 March 1894	Sheffield United	H	0–2		5,000
12 March 1894	Blackburn Rovers	H	5–1	Donaldson (3), Clarkin, Farman	5,000
17 March 1894	Derby County	H	2–6	Clarkin	7,000
23 March 1894	Stoke City	H	6–2	Farman (2), Peden (2), Clarkin, Erentz	8,000
24 March 1894	Bolton Wanderers	H	2–2	Donaldson, Farman	10,000
26 March 1894	Blackburn Rovers	A	0–4		5,000
31 March 1894	Stoke City	A	1–3	Clarkin	4,000
7 April 1894	Nottingham Forest	A	0–2		4,000
14 April 1894	Preston North End	H	1–3	Mathieson	4,000

Pos	Team	Pld	W	D	L	GF	GA	GAv	Pts	Relegation
12	The Wednesday	30	9	8	13	48	57	0.842	26	
13	Bolton Wanderers	30	10	4	16	38	52	0.731	24	
14	Preston North End (O)	30	10	3	17	44	56	0.786	23	Qualification for test matches
15	Darwen (R)	30	7	5	18	37	83	0.446	19	Qualification for test matches
16	Newton Heath (R)	30	6	2	22	36	72	0.500	14	Qualification for test matches

Source: World Football
Rules for classification: 1) Points; 2) Goal average; 3) Goals scored
(O) Play-off winners; (R) Relegated

=== Test match ===
Date	Opponents	Venue	Result F–A	Scorers	Attendance
28 April 1894	Liverpool	Ewood Park	0–2		4,000

== FA Cup ==
Date	Round	Opponents	H / A	Result F–A	Scorers	Attendance
27 January 1894	Round 1	Middlesbrough	H	4–0	Donaldson (2), Farman, Peden	5,000
10 February 1894	Round 2	Blackburn Rovers	H	0–0		18,000
17 February 1894	Round 2 Replay	Blackburn Rovers	A	1–5	Donaldson	5,000

== Lancashire Senior Cup ==
Date	Round	Opponents	H / A	Result F–A	Scorers	Attendance
20 January 1894	Round 1	Everton	A	1–7	McNaught	10,000

== Manchester Senior Cup ==
Date	Round	Opponents	H / A	Result F–A	Scorers	Attendance
3 February 1894	Round 1	Bolton Wanderers	A	2–3	Farman, Graham	2,000
