= List of Manchester United F.C. captains =

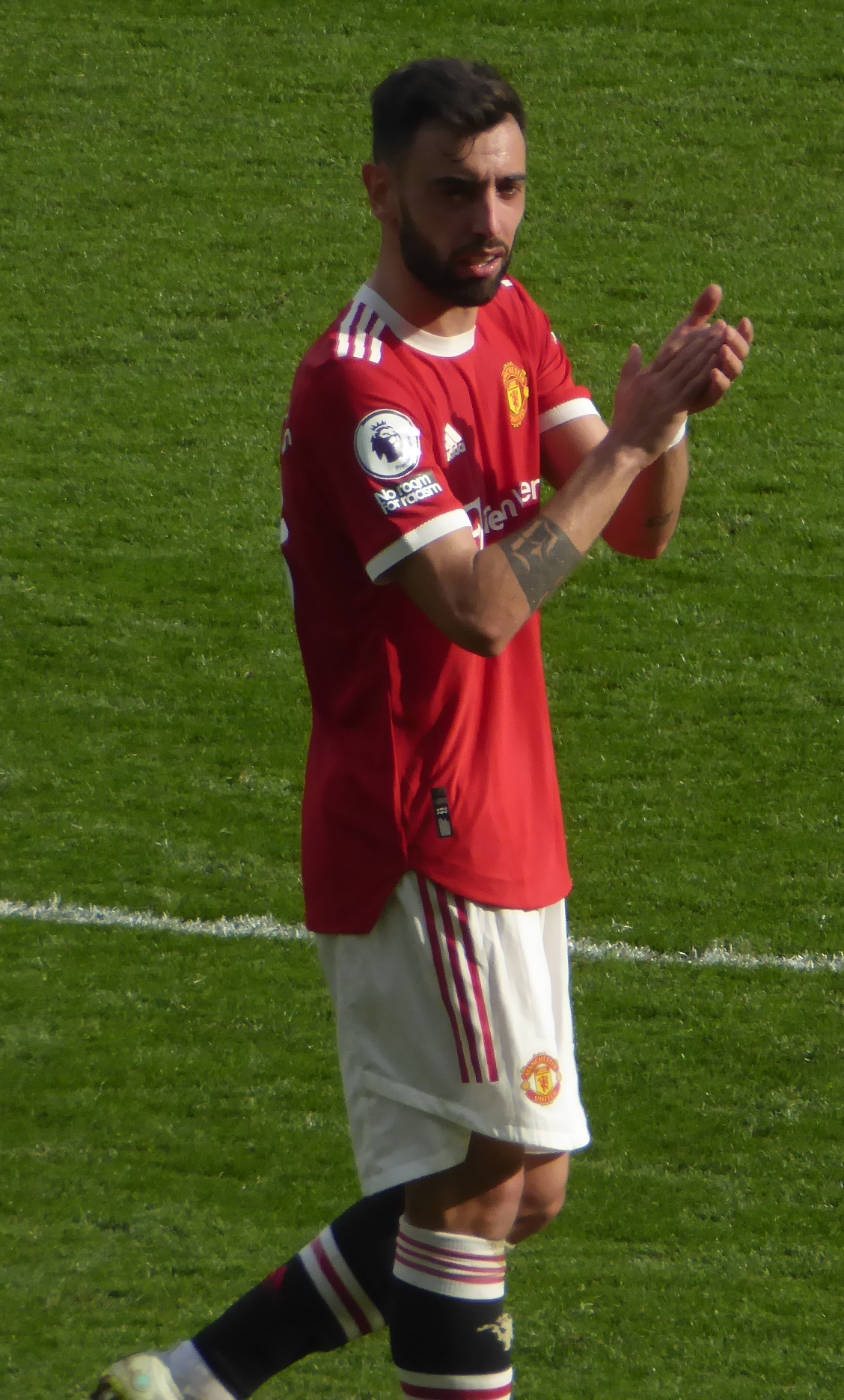
Bruno Fernandes was appointed captain of Manchester United on 20 July 2023.

Since 1882, 46 players have held the position of club captain for Newton Heath LYR F.C., Newton Heath F.C. or Manchester United F.C.

The first club captain was E. Thomas, who was captain from 1882 to 1883. The longest-serving captain is Bryan Robson, who was club captain from 1982 to 1994, although he held the position jointly with Steve Bruce for the last two years of his tenure. Roy Keane, who was captain from 1997 to 2005, has the distinction of having won the most trophies as captain; he won four Premier League titles, two FA Cups, one Community Shield, one UEFA Champions League and one Intercontinental Cup. Bruno Fernandes is the current Manchester United captain.

== Captains ==
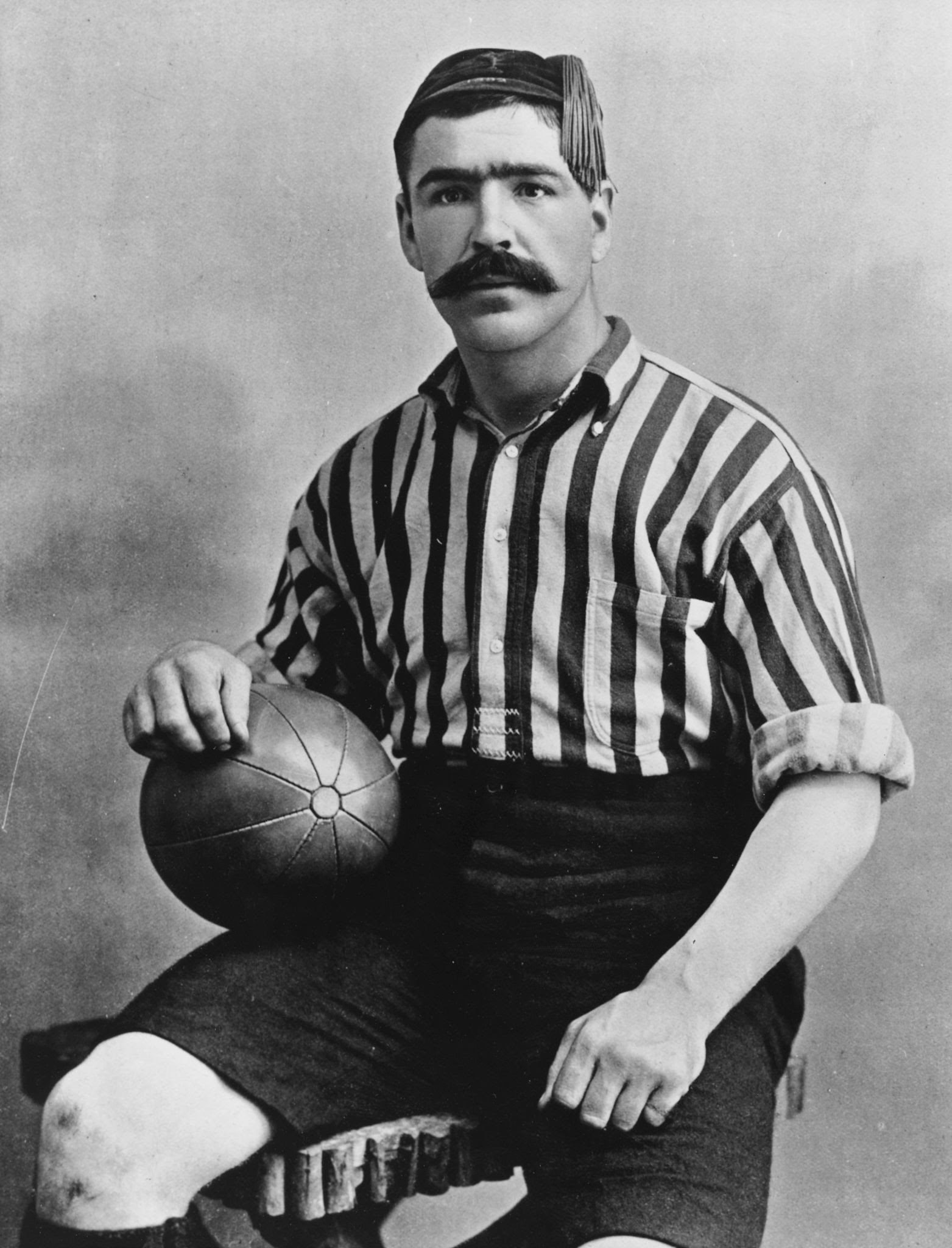
Caesar Jenkyns served as captain during the 1896–97 season.

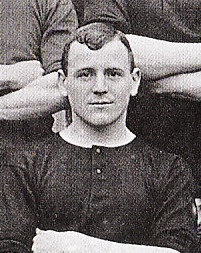
Charlie Roberts was captain when Manchester United won their first league title in 1907.

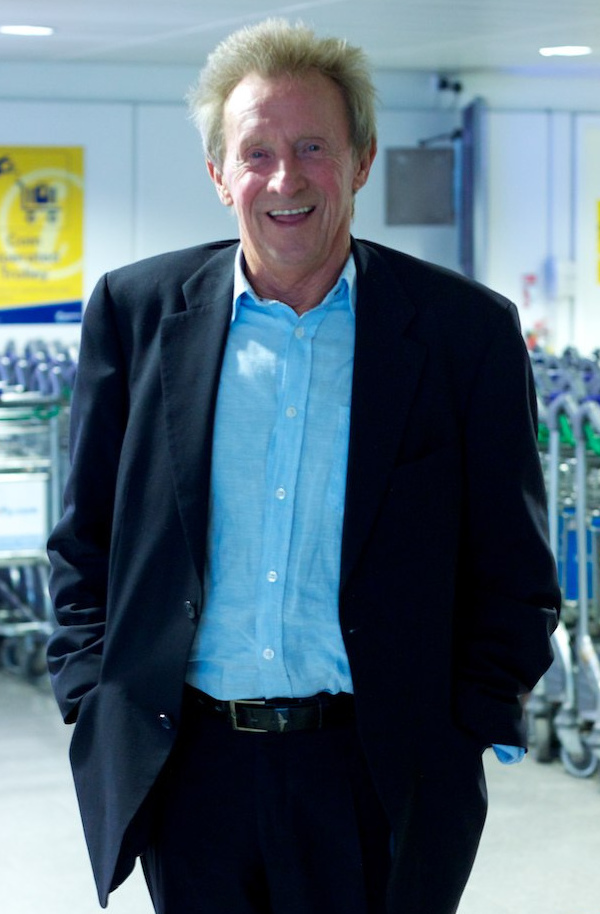
Denis Law captained Manchester United to their first European honour. He made 494 appearances for the club and scored 237 goals.

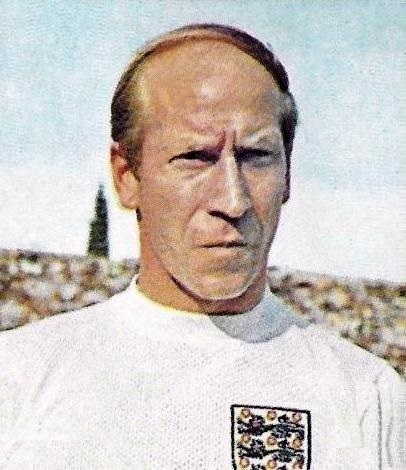
Bobby Charlton is United's second-highest goalscorer and has the second-most appearances for the club. He captained the club from 1968 to 1973.

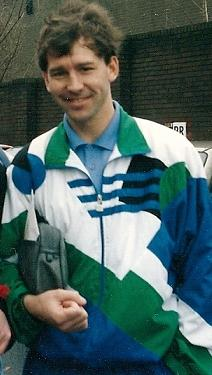
Bryan Robson made 461 appearances for Manchester United and is the longest serving captain in the club's history, serving for twelve years.

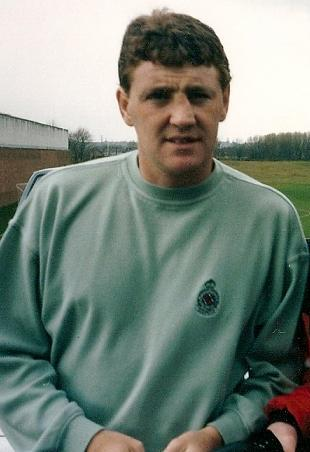
Steve Bruce served as captain from 1994 to 1996.

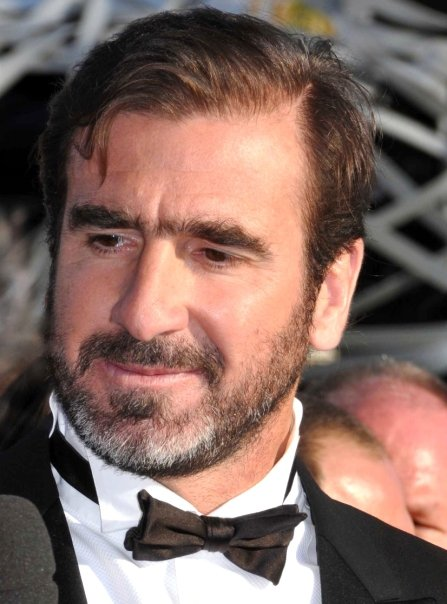
Eric Cantona made 185 appearances and scored 87 goals for Manchester United. He was the club's first captain from outside the United Kingdom and the Republic of Ireland.

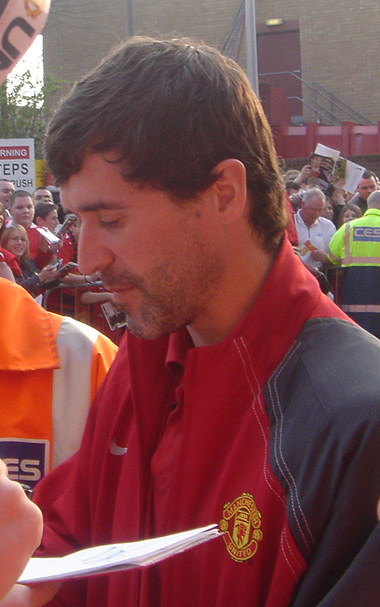
Roy Keane made 480 appearances with Manchester United and is the most decorated captain in club history, serving from 1997 to 2005.

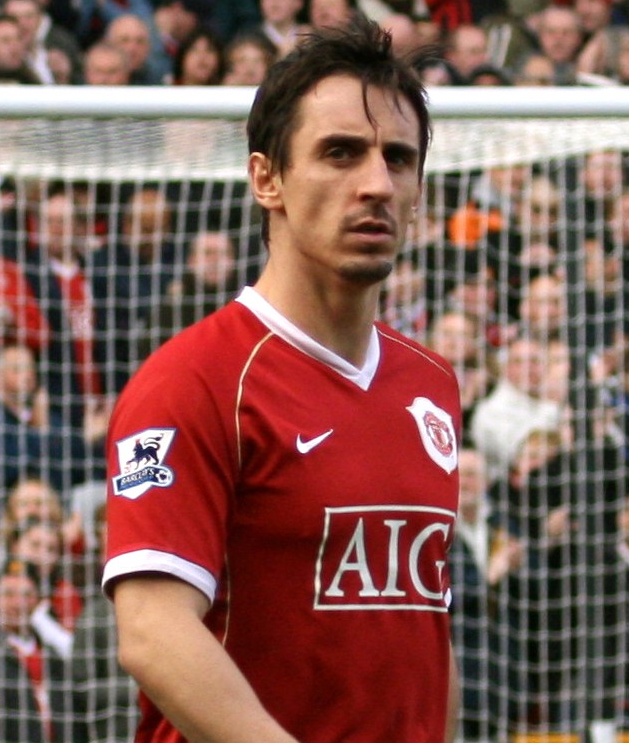
Gary Neville made 602 appearances for Manchester United and served as captain from 2005 to 2011.

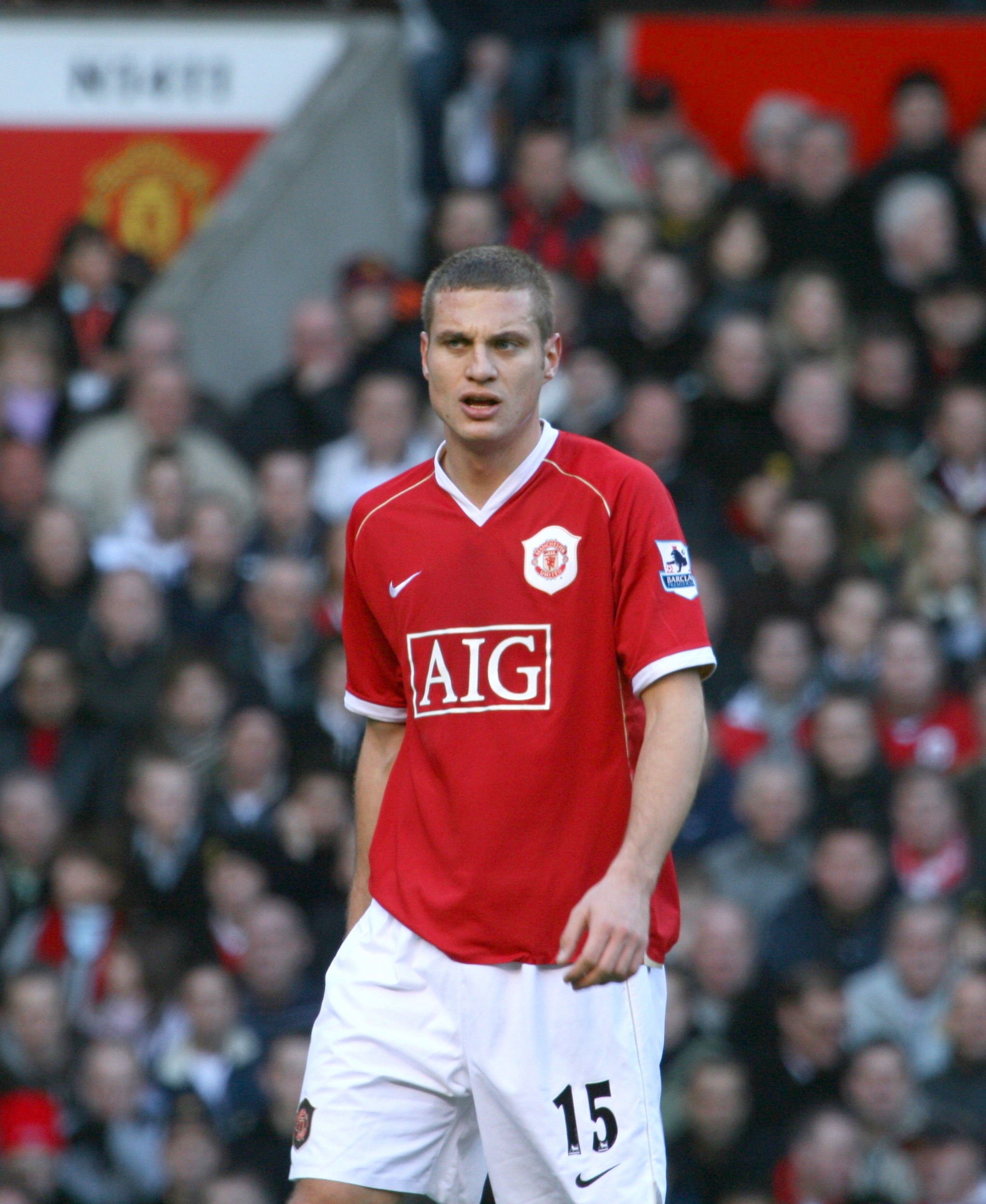
Nemanja Vidić made 300 appearances for Manchester United and served as captain from 2011 to 2014.

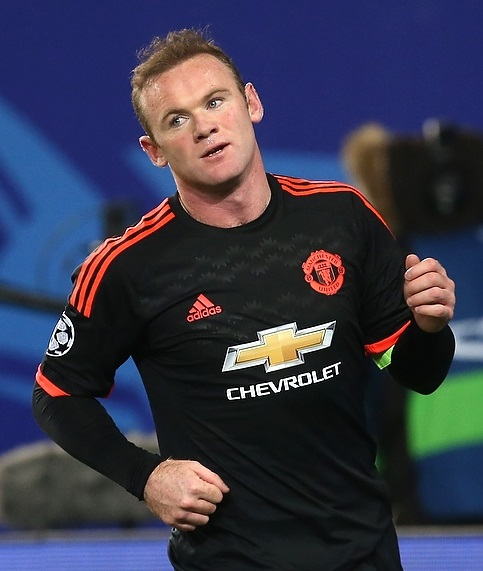
Wayne Rooney is the club's all-time top scorer with 253 goals. He captained the club from 2014 to 2017.

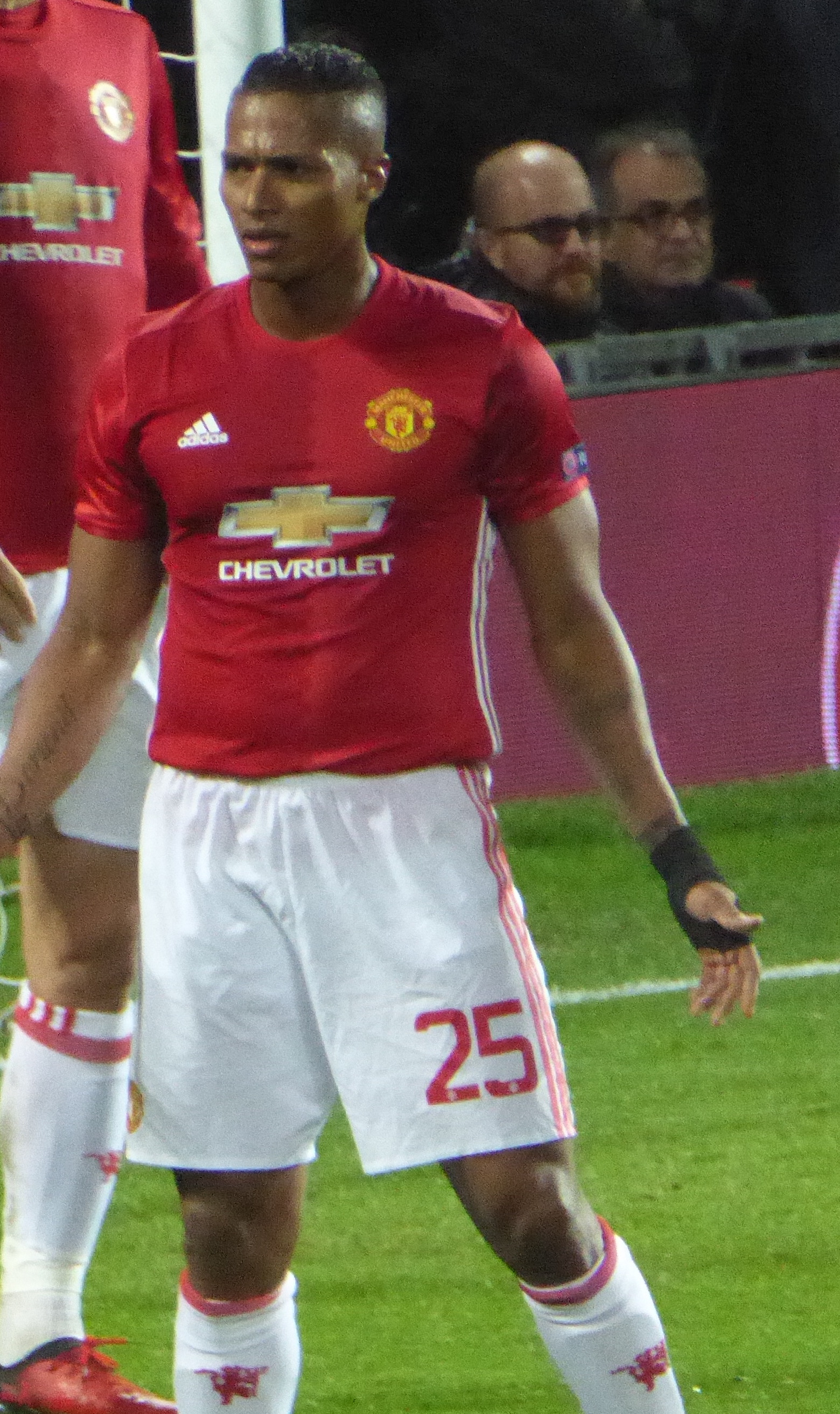
Antonio Valencia captained the Manchester United in his final season of his ten years with the club. He was United's first captain from outside of Europe.

Dates	Captain	Honours (Note: As captain only; Bold indicates the honour was part of a domestic or continental double, Bold italics indicates the honour was part of a treble.)	Ref.
1878–1882	Unknown		
1882–1883	E. Thomas		
1883–1887	(England) Sam Black		
1887–1891	(Wales) Jack Powell		
1891–1892	(Scotland) Bob McFarlane		
1892–1893	(Scotland) Joe Cassidy		
1893–1894	Unknown		
1894–1896	(Scotland) James McNaught		
1896–1897	(Wales) Caesar Jenkyns		
1897–1903	(England) Harry Stafford		
1903–1904	(England) John Willie Sutcliffe		
1904–1905	(Scotland) Jack Peddie		
1905–1913	(England) Charlie Roberts	1906–07 First Division; 1908 Charity Shield; 1908–09 FA Cup; 1910–11 First Division; 1911 Charity Shield	
1913–1914	(England) George Stacey		
1914–1915	(England) George Hunter		
1915–1917	(Ireland) Patrick O'Connell		
1917–1918	(England) George Anderson		
1918–1919	(England) Jack Mew		
1919–1922	(England) Lal Hilditch		
1922–1928	(England) Frank Barson		
1928–1929	(England) Jack Wilson		
1929–1930	(England) Charlie Spencer		
1930–1931	(England) Jack Silcock		
1931–1932	(Scotland) George McLachlan		
1932	(England) Louis Page		
1932–1934	(England) Jack Silcock		
1934–1935	(Scotland) Bill McKay		
1935–1937	(Scotland) James Brown	1935–36 Second Division	
1937–1939	(England) George Roughton		
1939–1940	(Scotland) Bill McKay		
1940–1944	No competitive football was played during the Second World War		
1944–1945	(England) George Roughton		
1945–1953	(Republic of Ireland) Johnny Carey (Note: First non-British captain)	1947–48 FA Cup; 1951–52 First Division; 1952 Charity Shield	
1953	(England) Stan Pearson		
1953–1955	(England) Allenby Chilton		
1955–1958	(England) Roger Byrne (Note: Byrne died in the Munich air disaster)	1955–56 First Division; 1956 Charity Shield; 1956–57 First Division; 1957 Charity Shield	
1958–1959	(England) Bill Foulkes		
1959–1960	(England) Dennis Viollet		
1960–1962	(England) Maurice Setters		
1962–1967	(Republic of Ireland) Noel Cantwell	1962–63 FA Cup; 1964–65 First Division; 1965 Charity Shield; 1966–67 First Division	
1967–1968	(Scotland) Denis Law	1967 Charity Shield; 1967–68 European Cup	
1968–1973	(England) Bobby Charlton		
1973–1974	(Scotland) George Graham		
1974–1975	(Scotland) Willie Morgan	1974–75 Second Division	
1975–1982	(Scotland) Martin Buchan	1976–77 FA Cup; 1977 Charity Shield	
1982–1994	(England) Bryan Robson (Note: Longest-serving captain in United's history)	1982–83 FA Cup; 1983 Charity Shield; 1984–85 FA Cup; 1989–90 FA Cup; 1990 Charity Shield; 1990–91 European Cup Winners' Cup; 1991 European Super Cup; 1991–92 Football League Cup; 1992–93 Premier League; 1993–94 Premier League; 1993–94 FA Cup	
1994–1996	(England) Steve Bruce	1994 Community Shield; 1995–96 Premier League; 1995–96 FA Cup	
1996–1997	(France) Eric Cantona (Note: First captain from outside the British Isles)	1996 Community Shield; 1996–97 Premier League	
1997–2005	(Republic of Ireland) Roy Keane	1997 Community Shield; 1998–99 Premier League; 1998–99 FA Cup; 1998–99 UEFA Champions League; 1999 Intercontinental Cup; 1999–2000 Premier League; 2000–01 Premier League; 2002–03 Premier League; 2003 Community Shield; 2003–04 FA Cup	
2005–2010	(England) Gary Neville	2005–06 Football League Cup; 2006–07 Premier League; 2007 Community Shield; 2007–08 Premier League; 2007–08 UEFA Champions League; 2008 Community Shield; 2008 FIFA Club World Cup; 2008–09 Football League Cup; 2008–09 Premier League; 2009–10 Football League Cup	
2010–2014	(Serbia) Nemanja Vidić	2010 Community Shield; 2010–11 Premier League; 2011 Community Shield; 2012–13 Premier League; 2013 Community Shield	
2014–2017	(England) Wayne Rooney	2015–16 FA Cup; 2016 Community Shield; 2016–17 EFL Cup; 2016–17 UEFA Europa League	
2017–2018	(England) Michael Carrick		
2018–2019	(Ecuador) Antonio Valencia (Note: First non-European captain)		
2019–2020	(England) Ashley Young (Note: Was only captain for half of the 19/20 campaign, before his move to Inter Milan in January 2020)		
2020–2023	(England) Harry Maguire	2022–23 EFL Cup	
2023–	(Portugal) Bruno Fernandes	2023–24 FA Cup	

== Vice-captains ==
The vice-captain position at Manchester United has been announced by managers after a player has been appointed on a de facto basis. In general, the vice-captain has succeeded the captain.

Dates	Vice-captain	Captain	Ref.
2010–2014	(France) Patrice Evra	(Serbia) Nemanja Vidic	
2014–2015	(Scotland) Darren Fletcher	(England) Wayne Rooney	
2015–2017	(England) Michael Carrick	(England) Wayne Rooney	
2017–2018	(Ecuador) Antonio Valencia	(England) Michael Carrick	
2018–2019	(France) Paul Pogba	(Ecuador) Antonio Valencia	
2019–2020	Position vacant	(England) Ashley Young	
2020–2023	(Portugal) Bruno Fernandes	(England) Harry Maguire	
2023–present	(England) Harry Maguire	(Portugal) Bruno Fernandes	
