= Higson =

Higson is an English surname. Notable people with the surname include:

- Allison Higson (born 1973), Canadian swimmer
- Charlie Higson, British actor, author and singer
- James Higson, English footballer
- Joanna Higson, English actress
- John Higson, English rugby player, father of Leonard
- Kenneth Higson, Canadian politician
- Leonard Higson, English rugby player, son of John
- Paddy Higson, Scottish film and television producer

== See also ==
- 3025 Higson, an asteroid
- Higsons (disambiguation)
