= James Vance (footballer) =

Scottish footballer

Personal information
- Full name: James Vance
- Date of birth: 1877
- Place of birth: Stevenston, Scotland
- Date of death: Unknown
- Height: 5 ft 10 1/2 in (1.79 m)
- Position: Inside left

Senior career*
Years	Team	Apps	(Gls)
?–1896	Annbank		
1896	Newton Heath	11	(1)
1896–1897	Fairfield		
1897–?	Annbank		
- * Club domestic league appearances and goals

James Vance (1877 – unknown) was a Scottish footballer who could play in any of the forward positions, preferring the inside left role. Born in Stevenston, he played for Annbank, Newton Heath and Fairfield.

Vance was part of the Annbank side that won the Scottish Qualifying Cup in 1895, beating East Stirlingshire in the final. He was one of several Annbank players signed by Newton Heath in the 1890s, moving to Manchester in January 1896 as cover for the injured Joe Cassidy. He made his debut for the club in a league game at home to Leicester Fosse on 3 February 1896, starting at inside left in a 2–0 win. Despite scoring Newton Heath's only goal in their next game – a 4–1 defeat away to Burton Swifts on 8 February – he then missed both matches of the FA Cup second round tie against Derby County, as well as a 2–1 league defeat at home to Burton Wanderers, before returning to the side for the final eight games of the 1895–96 season.

Cassidy's return from injury and the signings of Rimmer Brown and Matthew Gillespie meant Vance only made one more appearance for Newton Heath – a 3–0 win over Burton Wanderers on 24 October 1896 – and he was allowed to move to Lancashire League side Fairfield in December 1896, where he joined up with fellow former Annbank players Tommy and David Fitzsimmons. However, he spent just three months there before returning to Annbank.
