= Edwin Lee =

Edwin Lee may refer to:

- Edwin Lee (physician) (died 1870), English surgeon
- Edwin Gray Lee (1836–1870), American soldier and Confederate brigadier general during the American Civil War
- Edwin Ferdinand Lee (1884–1948), American Missionary Bishop of the Methodist Episcopal Church and the Methodist Church
- Ed Lee (Edwin M. Lee, 1952–2017), mayor of San Francisco, California
- Edwin Lee (footballer) (1879–?), English footballer
- Edwin W. Lee (1875–1942), American football player and coach

== See also ==
- Robert Edwin Lee (1918–1994), American playwright and lyricist
- Walter Edwin Lees (1887–1957), American aviator
