= John Dow =

John Dow may refer to:

- John Dow (Australian politician) (1837–1923), Australian politician
- John Dow (footballer) (1873–?), Scottish footballer
- John G. Dow (1905–2003), U.S. Representative from New York
- John K. Dow (1861–1961), American architect
- John T. Dow, Wisconsin legislator
