= Alf Farman =

English footballer

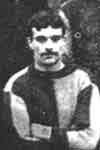

Personal information
- Date of birth: April 1869
- Place of birth: Kings Norton, Birmingham, England
- Date of death: November 1926 (aged 57)
- Positions: Outside right; inside right

Senior career*
Years	Team	Apps	(Gls)
- Birmingham Excelsior
?–1888	Aston Villa		
1888–1889	Bolton Wanderers	0	(0)
1889–1895	Newton Heath	51	(18)
Total		51	(18)
- * Club domestic league appearances and goals

Alfred H. Farman (April 1869 – November 1926) was an English footballer who played as a forward.

== Career ==
Born in Kings Norton, Birmingham, he played for Birmingham Excelsior, Aston Villa and Bolton Wanderers before joining Newton Heath in early 1889. He played in three friendlies before the end of the 1888–89 season, scoring a goal in each of them. He was in the Heathens' team that first joined the Football Alliance in the 1889–90 season, and finally made his competitive debut on 9 November 1889 in a 3–0 home win over Long Eaton Rangers, in which he scored a goal. At Newton Heath, which was later renamed Manchester United, he scored 53 goals in 121 appearances, before leaving in June 1895.

He played for them in their two seasons in the First Division and for one season after they were relegated to the Second Division. He scored a hat-trick in Newton Heath's first game at their new ground at Bank Street against Burnley on 2 September 1893, and also scored the first penalty in English football history during a friendly between Newton Heath and Blackpool on 5 September 1891.

== Career statistics ==
Club	Season	League		FA Cup		Other		Total	
Club	Season	Apps	Goals	Apps	Goals	Apps	Goals	Apps	Goals
Newton Heath
Newton Heath	1889–90	0	0	1	0	0	0	1	0
Newton Heath	1890–91	0	0	1	0	0	0	1	0
Newton Heath	1891–92	0	0	3	4	0	0	3	4
Newton Heath	1892–93	28	10	1	0	2	4	31	14
Newton Heath	1893–94	18	8	1	1	1	0	20	9
Newton Heath	1894–95	5	0	0	0	0	0	5	0
Total		51	18	7	6	3	4	61	28
