= Billy Draycott =

English footballer (1869–1943)

Personal information
- Full name: William Levi Draycott
- Date of birth: 15 February 1869
- Place of birth: Newhall, England
- Date of death: May 1943 (aged 74)
- Height: 5 ft 7 in (1.70 m)
- Position: Right half

Senior career*
Years	Team	Apps	(Gls)
1890–1891	Burslem Port Vale	2	(1)
1892–1894	Stoke	2	(0)
1894–1896	Burton Wanderers	47	(3)
1896–1899	Newton Heath	81	(6)
1889–1900	Bedminster	28	(0)
1900–1901	Bristol Rovers	14	(0)
1901–?	Wellingborough	?	(?)
	Luton Town	?	(?)
- * Club domestic league appearances and goals

William Levi Draycott (15 February 1869 – May 1943) was an English footballer who played as a right half for Burslem Port Vale, Stoke, Burton Wanderers, Newton Heath, Bedminster, Bristol Rovers, Wellingborough and Luton Town in the 1890s and early 1900s.

== Career ==
Draycott probably joined Burslem Port Vale in the summer of 1890. He made his debut at the Athletic Ground in a 2–1 friendly defeat to West Bromwich Albion on 29 September 1890. He made nine appearances for the club, scoring two goals, and was a member of the side that shared the North Staffordshire Charity Challenge Cup in 1891.

He transferred to local rivals Stoke in June 1891, where he played in just two the Football League matches in three seasons at the Victoria Ground. He then spent the 1894–95 and 1895–96 seasons with Football League newcomers Burton Wanderers, scoring three goals in 50 league games.

He joined Newton Heath in May 1896. He scored five goals in 1896–97 to help the club secure second place in the Second Division; however, they lost to Sunderland in the promotion/relegation Test Match. Newton Heath then finished fourth in 1897–98 and 1898–99, with Draycott scoring on only one further occasion. Over three years, he made 91 appearances for the Manchester club before transferring to Bedminster in 1899. Bedminster finished sixth in the Southern League in 1899–1900. He then spent the 1900–01 campaign with rivals Bristol Rovers before moving on to Wellingborough and Luton Town.

== Career statistics ==
Appearances and goals by club, season and competition
Club	Season	League			FA Cup		Test Matches		Total	
Club	Season	Division	Apps	Goals	Apps	Goals	Apps	Goals	Apps	Goals
Burslem Port Vale	1890–91	Midland League	2	1	1	0	0	0	3	1
Stoke	1891–92	Football League	1	0	0	0	0	0	1	0
Stoke	1892–93	First Division	0	0	0	0	0	0	0	0
Stoke	1893–94	First Division	1	0	0	0	0	0	1	0
Stoke	Total		2	0	0	0	0	0	2	0
Burton Wanderers	1894–95	Second Division	26	3	5	0	0	0	31	3
Burton Wanderers	1895–96	Second Division	21	0	2	0	0	0	23	0
Burton Wanderers	Total		47	3	7	0	0	0	54	3
Newton Heath	1896–97	Second Division	29	5	3	0	4	0	36	5
Newton Heath	1897–98	Second Division	21	0	3	0	0	0	24	0
Newton Heath	1898–99	Second Division	31	1	2	0	0	0	33	1
Newton Heath	Total		81	6	8	0	4	0	89	6
Career total			132	10	16	0	4	0	148	10

== Honours ==
Burslem Port Vale

- North Staffordshire Charity Challenge Cup: 1891
