= Fred Erentz =

Scottish footballer

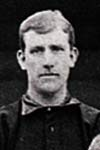

Personal information
- Full name: Frederick Charles Erentz
- Date of birth: 10 June 1870
- Place of birth: Broughty Ferry, Scotland
- Date of death: 6 April 1938 (aged 67)
- Place of death: Dundee, Scotland
- Height: 5 ft 10 1/2 in (1.79 m)
- Positions: Left-back; left-half

Senior career*
Years	Team	Apps	(Gls)
?–1892	Dundee Our Boys	?	(?)
1892–1902	Newton Heath	287	(9)
- * Club domestic league appearances and goals

Frederick Charles Erentz (10 June 1870 – 6 April 1938) was a Scottish footballer who played at half-back and full-back for Dundee Our Boys and Newton Heath in the 1880s, 1890s and early 1900s.

== Early life ==
Born in Broughty Ferry, near Dundee, to a Danish father, Erentz began his football career with Dundee Our Boys. Originally a half-back, Erentz was signed by Newton Heath in June 1892 in preparation for their first season in The Football League. He made his Newton Heath debut on 3 September 1892, playing at left half in a 4–3 defeat by Blackburn Rovers. Erentz was almost an ever-present during the 1892–93 season, missing only an away match against Derby County on 11 February 1893.

== Career ==
The following season, Erentz was deployed in several different positions, including right half and both right forward positions, from where he scored his first goal for the club, but he made most of his appearances in 1893–94 at left-back. Erentz was effectively ever-present at left-back over his next eight seasons at the club, and even rejected a sizeable contract offer from Tottenham Hotspur, where his brother Harry played at right-back. He was the first player to amass 100 appearances for Newton Heath, a feat he achieved on 14 December 1895 in a league match against Notts County. Additionally, he became club's first player to achieve 200 and 300 games.

Erentz retired from football at the end of the 1901–02 season as a result of a knee injury. His final appearance for the club was also the last match the club played as Newton Heath before becoming Manchester United, a 2–1 win over Manchester City in the final of the Manchester Senior Cup on 26 April 1902. With 310 matches he was club's record appearance maker until 21 November 1914, when George Wall played 311th of his 319 games for Manchester United.

== Career statistics ==
Club	Season	Division	League		National Cup		Total	
Club	Season	Division	Apps	Goals	Apps	Goals	Apps	Goals
Newton Heath	1892–93	First Division	31	0	1	0	32	0
Newton Heath	1893–94	First Division	23	3	3	0	26	3
Newton Heath	1894–95	Second Division	28	1	1	0	29	1
Newton Heath	1895–96	Second Division	24	0	2	0	26	0
Newton Heath	1896–97	Second Division	31	0	6	0	37	0
Newton Heath	1897–98	Second Division	28	1	3	0	31	1
Newton Heath	1898–99	Second Division	32	1	2	0	34	1
Newton Heath	1899–1900	Second Division	34	2	1	0	35	2
Newton Heath	1900–01	Second Division	31	0	3	0	34	0
Newton Heath	1901–02	Second Division	25	2	1	0	26	2
Newton Heath	Total		287	9	23	0	310	9
