= Godsmark (surname) =

Godsmark is a surname. Notable people with the surname include:

- Gilbert Godsmark (1877–1901), English professional footballer
- Jonny Godsmark (born 1989), retired English football player
- Nyle Godsmark (born 1902), Scottish rugby union player
