= Edgar Wilson (disambiguation) =

Edgar Wilson was a member of the US House of Representatives for Ohio between 1899–1903.

Edgar Wilson may also refer to:

- Edgar C. Wilson, member of the US House of Representatives for Virginia
- Edgar Bright Wilson (politician), Speaker of the Tennessee House of Representatives
- Edgar Bright Wilson, American chemist
- Edgar Wilson (footballer), English footballer
- Edgar Wilson (died 1976), American businessman, namesake of the Edgar Wilson Award
