= Charles Rothwell (footballer) =

English footballer

Charles Rothwell was an English footballer. His regular position was as a forward. He played for Newton Heath from 1893 to 1897.
