= Harry Lappin =

English footballer

Personal information
- Full name: Hubert Henry Lappin
- Date of birth: 16 January 1879
- Place of birth: Manchester, England
- Date of death: 1925 (aged 45–46)
- Place of death: Liverpool, England
- Position: Outside left

Senior career*
Years	Team	Apps	(Gls)
–1900	Springfield		
1900–1901	Oldham Athletic		
1901–1903	Manchester United	27	(4)
1903–1904	Grimsby Town	20	(4)
1904–1905	Rossendale United	27	(4)
1905–1906	Nelson		
1906	Rhyl		
1906–1907	Clapton Orient	38	(1)
1908–1909	Chester		
1909–1910	Birmingham	11	(2)
- Chirk
- Oswestry United
1910–1913	Hurst		
1912	Wrexham	5	(1)
1913–1914	Macclesfield	36	(2)
–1919	Hurst		
1919	Mossley		
1919–1920	Macclesfield	10	(0)
- * Club domestic league appearances and goals

Hubert Henry Lappin (16 January 1879 – 1925) was an English professional footballer who played as an outside left in the Football League for Clapton Orient, Manchester United, Grimsby Town and Birmingham.

== Personal life ==
Lappin had two brothers, was married to Elizabeth and had two sons. As of 1900, he worked as a yarn dyer. He served in the 1st Royal Lancashire Militia of the King's Own (Royal Lancaster Regiment) for a short period in 1900 and remained on the reserve list until 1910. In April 1915, 9 months after the breakout of the First World War, Lappin enlisted as a sergeant in the Royal Flying Corps. He became a Sergeant Mechanic in March 1918 and was discharged in April 1920.

== Career statistics ==
Appearances and goals by club, season and competition
Club	Season	League			FA Cup		Other		Total	
Club	Season	Division	Apps	Goals	Apps	Goals	Apps	Goals	Apps	Goals
Manchester United	1900–01	Second Division	1	0	—		—		1	0
Manchester United	1901–02	Second Division	21	3	0	0	—		21	3
Manchester United	1902–03	Second Division	5	1	0	0	—		5	1
Manchester United	Total		27	4	0	0	—		27	4
Grimsby Town	1903–04	Second Division	20	4	1	0	—		21	4
Clapton Orient	1906–07	Second Division	38	1	0	0	—		38	1
Birmingham	1909–10	Second Division	11	2	1	1	—		12	3
Wrexham	1911–12	Birmingham and District League	5	1	—		—		5	1
Macclesfield	1913–14	Lancashire Combination Second Division	31	1	2	0	1 (Note: Appearance in Cheshire Senior Cup)	0	34	1
Macclesfield	1914–15	Lancashire Combination First Division	5	1	4	2	0	0	9	2
Macclesfield	Total		36	2	6	2	1	0	43	4
Macclesfield	1919–20	Cheshire League	10	0	0	0	0	0	10	0
Macclesfield	Total		46	2	6	2	1	0	53	4
Career total			147	14	8	3	1	0	156	17

== Honours ==
Chester

- The Combination:1908–09
- Cheshire Senior Cup: 1908–09

Hurst

- Manchester League: 1911–12
- Manchester Junior Cup: 1910–11

Macclesfield

- Lancashire Combination Second Division second-place promotion: 1913–14
