= John Graham (forward) =

English footballer (born 1873)

Personal information
- Full name: John Graham
- Date of birth: 1873
- Place of birth: Northumberland, England
- Position: Centre forward

Senior career*
Years	Team	Apps	(Gls)
- Blyth
1893–1894	Newton Heath	4	(0)
- * Club domestic league appearances and goals

John Graham (born 1873, date of death unknown) was an English footballer. His regular position was as a centre forward. He played for Blyth and Newton Heath.

Graham played for Blyth in his native Northumberland before joining Newton Heath in October 1893. He made his debut on 11 October 1893 in the 1–1 draw with Wolverhampton Wanderers, but played only three further games before leaving league football.
