= James Carman =

English footballer

James Carman (born 1876) was an English footballer. His regular position was as a forward. He was born in Salford, Lancashire. He played for Manchester United and Oldham County.
