= James Fisher (footballer) =

Scottish footballer

James Fisher (1876 – unknown) was a Scottish footballer. His regular position was as a forward. He was born in Stirling. He played for East Stirlingshire, St Bernard's, Aston Villa, King's Park, and Manchester United.
