= John Cunningham (Scottish footballer) =

Scottish footballer

John Cunningham (1868 – unknown) was a Scottish footballer. His regular position was as a forward. He was born in Glasgow. He played for Benburb, Glasgow Hibernian, Celtic, Partick Thistle, Heart of Midlothian, Rangers, Thistle, Preston North End, Sheffield United, Aston Villa, Wigan County, and Manchester United.

== See also ==
- Played for Celtic and Rangers
