= George Millar (footballer) =

Scottish footballer

George Millar (1874 – unknown) was a Scottish footballer. His regular position was as a forward. He played for Glasgow Perthshire, Chatham Town, and Manchester United.
