= Bogie Roberts =

English footballer

Personal information
- Full name: W. A. Roberts
- Position: Outside left

Senior career*
Years	Team	Apps	(Gls)
1897–1899	Newton Heath	9	(2)
- * Club domestic league appearances and goals

W. A. Roberts, commonly known as Bogie Roberts, was a footballer who played in nine league matches for Newton Heath in 1899. He signed for the club in April 1897, but had to wait almost two years for his league debut; after scoring at home to Darwen in the first round of the Lancashire Senior Cup on 19 December 1898, he started at outside left away to Loughborough on 18 February 1899. He then scored on his next appearance – away to Small Heath on 25 February. Despite the goal, he was dropped from the side for the next game, a 3–0 defeat away to Grimsby Town on 4 March, but returned two weeks later for a 2–1 home defeat to New Brighton Tower. Nevertheless, he made no further appearances before the end of the season.

Roberts returned to the first-team for the fourth game of the 1899–1900 season, away to Burton Swifts on 23 September 1899, and retained his place for the away game against Sheffield Wednesday the following week, before switching to outside right for the 1–0 win over Lincoln City on 7 October. He then missed the 1–0 away defeat to Small Heath on 14 October, before returning to his outside left position for a 2–1 win at home to New Brighton Tower on 21 October. Roberts' FA Cup debut came the following week, as he played away to South Shore in the first qualifying round on 28 October 1899, but the Heathens lost 3–1. He scored his second goal for Newton Heath in the team's next league match: a 2–0 home win over Woolwich Arsenal on 4 November. However, he only made one more appearance for Newton Heath: a 2–1 away defeat to Chesterfield six weeks later on 23 December 1899.

== Career statistics ==
Club	Season	League		FA Cup		Other		Total	
Club	Season	Apps	Goals	Apps	Goals	Apps	Goals	Apps	Goals
Newton Heath
Newton Heath	1889–90	3	1	0	0	0	0	3	1
Newton Heath	1890–91	6	1	1	0	0	0	7	1
Total		9	1	1	0	0	0	10	2
