= Gilbert Godsmark =

English footballer

Personal information
- Full name: Gilbert Godsmark
- Date of birth: January 1877
- Place of birth: Derby, England
- Date of death: February 1901 (aged 24)
- Place of death: South Africa
- Position: Inside forward

Senior career*
Years	Team	Apps	(Gls)
- Ashford United
1900	Newton Heath	9	(4)
- * Club domestic league appearances and goals

Gilbert Godsmark (January 1877 – February 1901) was an English footballer who played as an inside forward. Born in Derby, he began his career at Ashford United. In January 1900, he became Newton Heath's first signing for which they paid a fee, joining the club for £40 on the recommendation of forward Bob Donaldson. Half of the fee was paid on signing, with the remainder due if Godsmark were kept on after an initial trial period. He made his debut on 3 February 1900, playing at inside right in a 1–0 home win over Sheffield Wednesday; his performance was well received, with the Athletic News reporting that "Godsmark proved a great success, he has any amount of dash and ability". However, his stay at Newton Heath was curtailed three months later by a call-up to be a reservist with the British Army in the Second Boer War, after just nine league appearances and four goals. After just nine months in South Africa, Godsmark died from an unknown disease. Because his death meant he was unable to return to Newton Heath after the war, despite them retaining his registration after he was enlisted, they withheld the remaining £20 of his fee, for which Ashford served them with a writ.
