= William Brooks (footballer) =

English footballer

William Henry Brooks (born July 1873) was an English footballer. His regular position was as a forward. He was born in Stalybridge, Cheshire. He played for Manchester United and Stalybridge Rovers.
