= Stephen Preston (footballer) =

English footballer (born 1879)

Stephen Preston (1879 – unknown) was an English footballer who played as a forward. Born in Manchester, he was first signed as a trainee by Newton Heath in 1901 for the first of two spells with the club. In 1903, he was transferred to Stockport County, before rejoining Newton Heath (by now known as Manchester United) that same year. In 33 matches for Newton Heath/Manchester United, he scored 34 goals.
