= Frank Wedge =

English footballer

Francis Edgar Wedge (28 July 1876 – after 1898) was an English footballer. His regular position was as a forward. He was born in Dudley, Worcestershire. He played for Manchester United, Manchester Talbot, and Chorlton-cum-Hardy.
