= William Jackson (footballer) =

Welsh footballer

William James Jackson (27 January 1876 – 25 March 1954) was a Welsh footballer. His regular position was as an inside forward. He was born in Flint, Flintshire. He played for Flint, Rhyl, St Helens Recs, Newton Heath, Barrow, Burnley, Wigan County and Chester, where he made his début in an 8–0 win over Rhyl in October 1905. He won one cap for the Welsh national team in March 1899.
