= Bob McFarlane (footballer, died 1898) =

Scottish footballer (1866–1898)

Personal information
- Full name: Robert McFarlane
- Date of birth: c. 1866
- Place of birth: Airdrie, Scotland
- Date of death: October 1898 (aged 31–32)
- Place of death: Airdrie, Scotland
- Position: Full-back

Senior career*
Years	Team	Apps	(Gls)
?–1888	Airdrieonians		
1888–1890	Bootle		
1890–1891	Sunderland Albion		
1891–1892	Newton Heath	18	(1)
1892–1898	Airdrieonians	66	(2)
- * Club domestic league appearances and goals

Robert McFarlane (c. 1866 – October 1898) was a Scottish footballer who played as a full-back.

Born in Airdrie, McFarlane began his career with local side Airdrieonians, before moving to England to play for Bootle. He was part of the Bootle side that took part in the inaugural season of the Football Alliance in 1889–90, helping them to second place behind The Wednesday. That summer, he joined Sunderland Albion, whom he also helped to a runners-up spot in 1890–91.

He moved on to Newton Heath in 1891–92, where he took over as captain from the departing Jack Powell. He immediately became the club's first-choice right-back and played in all but four league matches during the season, scoring once in a 5–0 win at home to Walsall Town Swifts on 5 March 1892, as he secured his third successive second-place finish. He also played in four FA Cup matches (although the second round qualifying match was technically a friendly after their opponents, Heywood, were disqualified from the competition) and the Manchester Senior Cup semi-final defeat to Bolton Wanderers.

At the end of the season, while on holiday back home in Airdrie, he re-signed for Airdrieonians after being allowed to resume his amateur status. To replace McFarlane, Newton Heath signed Airdrieonians full-back Andrew Mitchell, who had been set to partner McFarlane in defence for the Scottish club. McFarlane played a further 66 league games between 1894 (when the club joined the Scottish Football League) and 1898, when he contracted pneumonia and died. His final appearance for the club came against Morton at Cappielow on 8 October 1898, and he died later that month.

McFarlane was married to a sister of the Doughty brothers, Jack and Roger, who also played for Newton Heath in their pre-League days.

Sporting positions
Preceded by Jack Powell	Newton Heath captain 1891–1892	Succeeded by Joe Cassidy
