= Robert Stephenson (footballer) =

British footballer

Personal information
- Date of birth: 10 November 1875
- Position: Forward

Senior career*
Years	Team	Apps	(Gls)
- Talbot
1895–1896	Newton Heath	1	(1)
- * Club domestic league appearances and goals

Robert Stephenson (born 10 November 1875) was an English footballer. His regular position was as a forward.

He played for Talbot and Newton Heath. He scored on his debut in the Heathens' 3–0 victory against Rotherham Town on 11 January 1896. An amateur inside forward, while still a student, he returned to amateur football after a most promising League debut.
