= Joe Ridgway =

English footballer

Joseph Arthur Ridgway (born 25 April 1873) was an English footballer. His regular position was as a goalkeeper. He was born in Chorlton-cum-Hardy, Lancashire (now in the city of Manchester). He played for West Manchester, Manchester United, and Rochdale Town.
