= James Bain (footballer) =

Scottish footballer

James Bain (1878 – unknown) was a Scottish footballer. His regular position was as a forward. He was born in Dundee. He played for Dundee and Manchester United.
