= Edwin Lee (physician) =

English medical writer (died 1870)

- Died: 8 June 1870
- Occupation: Medical writer

Edwin Lee (died 8 June 1870) was an English medical writer.

== Biography ==
Lee was entered the profession as an articled pupil of the Royal College of Surgeons, London. He became a student at St. George's Hospital in 1824, and during his apprenticeship attended the medical schools of Paris. In 1829 he was elected member of the College of Surgeons, and soon afterwards was appointed house-surgeon to St. George's Hospital, an office which he resigned before 1833. Subsequently, he competed for the house-surgeoncy of the Birmingham Hospital, but was defeated by one vote. He then passed some time on the continent attending medical institutions and investigating points of practice which at that time were not much known in England. Among these subjects was lithotrity, upon which he gave public demonstrations in London and some of the larger provincial towns. For his dissertation upon the advantages of this method of operating as compared with lithotomy the College of Surgeons in 1838 awarded him the Jacksonian prize. In 1844 he became a candidate for the assistant-surgeoncy to St. George's Hospital, but withdrew in consequence, as he alleged, of the gross unfairness of the proceedings. Upon the occasion of another vacancy, in 1848, he refused to stand; but protested against the system of election by advertisements in the 'Times' and 'Morning Chronicle,' and by a pamphlet addressed to the governors of the hospital. The College of Surgeons declined to admit him to the fellowship, whereupon he attacked Sir Benjamin Brodie and the governing body. Failing to obtain settled practice he divided his time between London, which he generally visited during the season, and one or other watering-place in England or on the continent. Latterly he resided much abroad. By 1846 Lee had received the M.D. degree of Göttingen. He was subsequently elected member of various foreign medical associations, including those of Paris, Berlin, and Naples, and was for some years fellow of the Royal Medico-Chirurgical Society of London. He died on 8 June 1870.

Lee was a man of great industry. He was best known by his handbooks to continental health resorts. His earliest work on the subject was ‘An Account of the most frequented Watering Places on the Continent … and of the Medicinal Application of their Mineral Springs; with … an Appendix on English Mineral Waters,’ 8vo, London, 1836. ‘Additional Remarks on the Use of English Mineral Springs’ followed in 1837, and ‘Practical Observations on Mineral Waters and Baths’ in 1846. Similar information Lee published under a variety of titles. ‘The Baths of Nassau, Baden, and the Adjacent Districts. First Part. Thermal Springs,’ was issued in 1839, and the portion treating of Nassau reappeared in 1863 (5th edit. 1869). ‘The Principal Baths of Germany,’ 2 vols. 8vo, is dated 1840–1. Rhenish Germany was similarly treated in 1850 (5th edit. 1870); Homburg in 1853 (new edit. 1861); France, Germany, and Switzerland collectively (3rd edit. 1854, another 3rd edit. 1857 in 2 vols., 4th edit. 1863); Vichy in 1862; Switzerland and Savoy in 1865, and collectively with France in 1867; the Engadine (St. Moritz and St. Tarasp) in 1869; Baden and Würtemberg (1 vol.), Spa (1 vol.), France (1 vol.), and Rhenish Prussia (1 vol.), in 1870. A work by Lee on English mineral springs (1841) was reissued as ‘The Baths and Watering Places of England’ in 1848, and was followed by books on Brighton (1850), on the Undercliff and Bournemouth (1856), and on the southern watering-places—Hastings, St. Leonards, Dover, and Tunbridge Wells (1856). He translated a French account of Nice (1854); wrote of Hyères and Cannes (1857 in French, translated 1867); of Mentone (1861); and of the health resorts of southern France collectively (1860, 1865, 1868). He won also several valuable prizes, including the town committee prize for an essay on ‘Cheltenham and its Resources’ (printed in 1851); the Fiske fund prize (United States) for a dissertation on ‘The Effect of Climate on Tuberculous Disease’ (published in 1858, and reissued with additions in 1867); that awarded by the Milan Society for the encouragement of arts and sciences, for an essay on ‘Le Magnétisme Animal: ses applications à la Physiologie et à la Thérapeutique’ (issued in English and in a greatly enlarged form in 1866); and another essay-prize given by the Toulouse medical society about 1860 on ‘Des Paralysies sans lésion organique appréciable,’ an English translation of which appeared in 1866.

Lee's writings (exclusive of memoirs contributed to medical journals and ephemeral pamphlets on the position of his profession) are, besides those mentioned:

- ‘A Treatise on some Nervous Disorders,’ 8vo, London, 1833; 2nd edit. 1838.
- ‘Observations on the Principal Medical Institutions and Practice of France, Italy, and Germany; with … an Appendix on Animal Magnetism and Homœopathy,’ 8vo, London, 1835; 2nd edit. 1843. The appendix was issued separately in 1835, 1838, and 1843.
- ‘Notes on Italy and Rhenish Germany,’ 12mo, Edinburgh, 1835.
- ‘Two Lectures on Lithotrity and the bi-lateral operation … also an Essay on the Dissolution of Gravel and Stone in the Bladder, by A. Chevallier, translated from the French,’ 2 pts. 8vo, London, 1837.
- ‘On Stammering and Squinting,’ 8vo, London, 1841.
- ‘Memoranda on France, Italy, and Germany,’ 8vo, London, 1841 (reissued in 1861 with considerable additions as ‘Bradshaw's Invalid's Companion to the Continent,’ 1861).
- ‘Report upon the Phenomena of Clairvoyance or Lucid Somnambulism,’ 12mo, London, 1843.
- ‘Hydropathy and Homœopathy impartially appreciated,’ 3rd edit. 12mo, London, 1847; 4th edit. 1859 and 1866.
- ‘Continental Travel,’ 8vo, London, 1848 (republished in an enlarged form in 1851 as ‘Bradshaw's Companion to the Continent’).
- ‘Notes on Spain, with a special Account of Malaga,’ 12mo, London, 1854; another edit. 1855.
- ‘The Medical Profession in Great Britain and Ireland; with an Account of the Medical Organisation of France, Italy, Germany, and America,’ 2 pts. 8vo, London, 1857; supplements appeared in 1863 and 1867.
- A translation of L. Aimé Martin's ‘The Education of Mothers,’ 12mo, London, 1860.
- ‘Remarks on Homœopathy,’ 12mo, London, 1861.
