= John Sneddon =

Scottish footballer

Personal information
- Date of birth: 1867
- Position: Forward

Senior career*
Years	Team	Apps	(Gls)
1887–1890	Heart of Midlothian	0	(0)
1891–1892	Newton Heath	21	(6)
1890–1891	Accrington	1	(0)
- * Club domestic league appearances and goals

John Sneddon (1867 – unknown) was a Scottish professional footballer who played as a forward.

He played for Hearts (5 appearances and 2 goals in Scottish Cup), Accrington (1 appearance in 1890–91 season) and Newton Heath. He scored the first goal ever in a Manchester derby vs Ardwick on 3 October 1891. He played in 3 FA Cup matches (scoring 1 goal) and in 21 Alliance matches (scoring 6 goals) for Newton Heath.
