= William Kennedy (Scottish footballer) =

Scottish footballer

William John Kennedy was a Scottish footballer. His regular position was as an inside forward. He played for Ayr Parkhouse, Newton Heath, Stockport County and Greenock Morton.
