= Arthur Henrys =

English footballer

Arthur Henrys (born 1870) was an English footballer. His regular position was at full back. He was born in Newcastle. He played for Manchester United, Notts Jardines, and Leicester Fosse.
