= George Owen (footballer) =

Welsh footballer

George Alfred Owen (1865 – 29 January 1922) was a Welsh footballer who played as an inside forward for Newton Heath in the late 1880s. He also made four appearances for the Welsh national team.

Born in Chirk, Denbighshire, Owen began his career with his local team, Chirk, before joining Newton Heath in January 1889. At the time of his signing, he was one of three Owens at the club, the other two being brothers Jack and William Owen. Owen played for Newton Heath for 1½ seasons, during which time he made 19 competitive appearances and scored five goals. In June 1890, Owen was transferred to West Manchester, before moving back to Chirk the following season. Two years with Druids followed, before he returned to Chirk for the final time in 1895. He retired from professional football in 1896, at the age of 31.

Owen also made four appearances for the Welsh national team. He made his debut for Wales while still with Chirk on 10 March 1888 in a British Home Championship match against Scotland; Wales lost the match 5–1. His two Wales caps won as a Newton Heath player came in the 1889 British Home Championship, in which he played in Wales' last two games: a 0–0 draw with Scotland and a 3–1 win over Ireland. Owen had to wait a further three years for his final Wales appearance, a match in which he scored his only goals for his country: a hat-trick in a 4–3 loss to Ireland.
