= Alfred Ambler =

English footballer

Alfred Ambler (born 1 July 1879) was an English footballer who played as a half-back. Born in Ardwick, Manchester, he played for Hyde United, Newton Heath and Colne.
