= Halliwell Rovers F.C. =

Halliwell Rovers
- Full name: Halliwell Rovers Football Club
- Founded: 1887
- Dissolved: 1899
- Ground: Bennetts
- Secretary: J. T. Howarth
Home colours

Halliwell Rovers F.C. was an English association football club based in Halliwell, in north-west Bolton.

== History ==
The earliest record of the club is of a victory in a friendly against the Swiss Rangers in October 1887. The club was originally restricted to minor football, as the leading club in the district, Halliwell F.C., had a prominence on the national stage. The Rovers however was one of the strongest sides at that level, only losing 3 matches between 1890 and 1893.

In 1895 it joined the Lancashire League, and entered the FA Cup for the first time, although, after being drawn to visit Workington in the first qualifying round, the Rovers withdrew.

Rovers' best League season was its first, as it came 2nd of 16 clubs, albeit 9 points behind champions Nelson. The two clubs were level at the start of March, when Nelson entertained the Rovers (albeit Rovers had played more games), but Nelson's 5–1 win was decisive in the title race.

In the Cup the club only won one tie, 2–0 at Freetown of Bury in the 1898–99 first qualifying round. In the second qualifying round, Rovers scratched after drawing with South Shore, unable to get a team together for the replay.

The club planned to move for the 1899–1900 season, claiming to have found a better site with space for a cycle track, but instead the club was forced to disband in May 1899. A number of its players joined Astley Bridge Wanderers as a result.

== Colours ==
The club wore navy blue and white striped shirts.

== Ground ==
The club played at the Bennetts, the old Halliwell F.C. ground.

== See also ==
- Halliwell Rovers players
