= Higsons =

Higsons may refer to:

- The Higsons, a 1980s English funk-punk band
- Higsons Brewery, a brewery in Liverpool, England
