= William Healey =

English businessman

William Joseph Healey (31 March 1853 – 29 May 1909) was an English businessman and president of Newton Heath Football Club in the 1890s, when he served as one of the club's principal creditors.

Healey was born in Salford to William Healey, a builder from Wicklow, Ireland, and Ann Connaughton Healy. He had one son, William Joseph Healy Jr., and founded William Healy and Son, a successful construction firm in Salford.

In 1897, a friendly tournament was inaugurated for clubs in the Manchester and Salford area. Healey provided a trophy for the tournament the following year, and the competition became known as the Healey Charity Cup.

Around the turn of the 20th century, Newton Heath's fortunes began to diminish, both on the pitch and in their bank balance, and they found themselves more than £2,500 in debt. Eventually, Healey took the club to court in order to claim back the £242 17s 10d that he was owed. Due to their large debts, the club was unable to repay Healey and was declared bankrupt. They were soon rescued by local businessman John Henry Davies and renamed "Manchester United". Davies took over as club chairman, thus ending Healey's association with the club.

== Personal life ==
Healy was a devout Roman Catholic. In his retirement, he became a supporter of the Franciscan Capuchin Monastic Church at Pantasaph, Flintshire, and donated generously to the friars' cause. Prior to his death he was received in private audience by Pope Pius X in Rome. He died at his residence in Pantasaph in 1909.
