= Edgar Wilson (footballer) =

English footballer

Personal information
- Position: Left forward

Senior career*
| Years | Team | Apps | (Gls) |
| 1889–1890 | Newton Heath LYR | 19 | (6) |
- * Club domestic league appearances and goals

Edgar Wilson was an English footballer who played as a forward. He was a regular member of the Newton Heath LYR team (who would later become Manchester United) in the 1889–90 season, during which he scored six goals in 19 appearances in the Football Alliance, including Newton Heath's 9–1 win at home to Small Heath on 7 April 1890. He also played in Newton Heath's 6–1 defeat away to Preston North End in the first round of the FA Cup on 18 January 1890, and was part of the side that won a third consecutive Manchester and District Challenge Cup.
