= Charlie Harrison (Manchester United footballer) =

English footballer

Charlie Harrison was an English footballer who played as a full back for Manchester United.
