= William Mathieson =

Scottish footballer

William Mathieson (born 1870) was a Scottish footballer. His regular position was as a forward. He was born in Glasgow. He played for Clydesdale, Glasgow Thistle, and Manchester United.
