= Henry Boyd (footballer) =

Scottish footballer

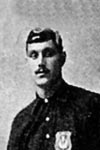

Personal information
- Date of birth: 29 April 1869
- Place of birth: Morningside, North Lanarkshire, Scotland
- Date of death: 14 September 1913 (aged 45)
- Place of death: Shotts, Scotland
- Position: Forward

Senior career*
Years	Team	Apps	(Gls)
1889–1890	Vale of Clyde		
1890–1891	Sunderland Albion		
1892	Burnley	4	(1)
1892–1893	West Bromwich Albion	7	(1)
1893–1894	Third Lanark	15	(6)
1894–1897	Woolwich Arsenal	40	(32)
1897–1899	Newton Heath	52	(32)
1899–1900	Falkirk		

International career
1894	Scottish Football League XI	1	(0)
- * Club domestic league appearances and goals

Henry Boyd (29 April 1869 – 14 September 1913) was a Scottish footballer.

== Career ==
A forward, Boyd was born in Lanarkshire and raised in Pollokshaws near Glasgow, but spent most of his career in England. He started out at Sunderland Albion and Burnley – spending some time in the United States in between – before joining West Bromwich Albion in 1892. After a year of sparing appearances for the Baggies he returned to Scotland, possibly to avoid a court summons for assault in the West Midlands. During an eventful 1893–94 season with Third Lanark he appeared in a Scottish Cup semi-final, was selected for the Scottish Football League XI, took part in a trial for the Scotland national team and became a father. He moved south again to join Second Division Woolwich Arsenal in May 1894.

He made an immediate impact at Arsenal, scoring on his debut against Grimsby Town on 10 September 1894, and scoring another seven goals in the next four matches. However, a little over a month later he broke his leg in a friendly match against Sunderland on 15 October and he was out of action for over a year, including some time AWOL back in Glasgow before being allowed to resume his Arsenal career. On his return, some seven matches into the 1895–96 season, he had recovered well enough to score prolifically, scoring 13 goals in 22 matches, and finishing the season as the club's top scorer. The following season, he was even more prolific, scoring 10 times in 12 league matches, which attracted the attention of other clubs, and he was allowed to leave Woolwich Arsenal at the end of 1896 after an incident involving club officials following an 8–0 defeat by Loughborough Town (still the club's record defeat in an official match); in all he played 41 matches for Woolwich Arsenal, scoring 32 times.

Newton Heath signed Boyd for £45 in January 1897. He spent two and a half years with the Manchester club, scoring three hat-tricks in the 1897–98 season, as he racked up 22 goals in total. However the following season, 1898–99, he only played five times, but still scored five goal). In August 1899 he left Newton Heath for disciplinary reasons; in total he had scored 35 goals in 62 games for the Bank Street club, which makes him one of their most prolific forwards in terms of goals per game. He joined Falkirk although his first weeks there were interrupted by the death of his infant daughter and no official appearances have been found for him.

Boyd's first wife died in 1904; he remarried again in 1906 and lived at various addresses in the east end of Glasgow. He died at Hartwood Hospital in September 1913, possibly due to syphilis.
