= James Higson =

English footballer

James Higson (born 1876) was an English footballer. His regular position was as a forward. He was born in Manchester. He played for Manchester Wednesday and Manchester United.
