= Bob Donaldson =

Scottish footballer

Personal information
- Full name: Robert Donaldson
- Date of birth: 27 August 1868
- Place of birth: Coatbridge, Scotland
- Date of death: 28 April 1947 (aged 78)
- Place of death: Airdrie, Scotland
- Position: Forward

Senior career*
| Years | Team | Apps | (Gls) |
| ?–1888 | Cliftonhill Rovers | ? | (?) |
| 1888–1891 | Airdrieonians | ? | (?) |
| 1891 | Blackburn Rovers | 0 | (0) |
| 1891–1897 | Newton Heath | 130 | (56) |
| 1897–1898 | Luton Town | 17 | (10) |
| 1898–1899 | Glossop North End | 32 | (18) |
| 1899–1900 | Ashford United | ? | (?) |
| Total | | 179 | (84) |
- * Club domestic league appearances and goals

Robert Donaldson (27 August 1868 – 28 April 1947) was a Scottish footballer. He played as a forward.

Donaldson signed with Scottish Football League Second Division Airdrieonians from Cliftonhill Rovers in December 1888. On leaving Airdrieonians in May 1891 he signed registration forms with both Blackburn Rovers and Newton Heath. The ensuing dispute between the two clubs was settled when he declared that as Blackburn had failed to register their form within the specified time he was therefore a Newton Heath player. The club were members of the Football Alliance for the 1891–92 season.

In the summer of 1892 Newton Heath were elected to the country's top league, the Football League First Division. He scored 66 goals in 147 Football League appearances for Newton Heath, the first of these goals scored against Blackburn Rovers on 3 September 1892 was the club's first ever Football League goal. Following Newton Heath's demotion to the Football League Second Division in 1894 he remained with the club for over three more seasons. In November 1897 he was suspended by Newton Heath for a breaching training regulations and placed on the transfer list and a month later for an £80 fee joined Football League Second Division club Luton Town.

His stay at Luton lasted only five months as at the end of the 1897–1898 season they were reconstructing their team and Donaldson was transferred with three other team-mates to Glossop North End. The transfers were the subject of a dispute between the clubs: a Football League tribunal set the fee at the £200 offered by Glossop rather than the £500 requested by Luton. In his single season with Glossop they were runners-up of the Football League Second Division and gained promotion to the First Division.

He left Glossop at the season's end before they played in their new league and signed-on at the start of the 1899–1900 season as a professional player with Kent League club Ashford United. In January 1900 owing to cost-cutting measures he was released by Ashford and in February was subject of negotiations between Glossop – who had continued to hold his Football League registration – and Newton Heath who were looking to appoint him as there reserve team coach.

== Career statistics ==
Appearances and goals by club, season and competition
| Club | Season | League | | FA Cup | | Other | | Total | |
| Club | Season | Apps | Goals | Apps | Goals | Apps | Goals | Apps | Goals |
|---|---|---|---|---|---|---|---|---|---|
| Newton Heath | 1892–93 | 26 | 16 | 1 | 0 | 2 | 0 | 29 | 16 |
| Newton Heath | 1893–94 | 24 | 7 | 3 | 3 | 1 | 0 | 28 | 10 |
| Newton Heath | 1894–95 | 27 | 15 | 1 | 0 | 1 | 0 | 29 | 15 |
| Newton Heath | 1895–96 | 17 | 7 | 3 | 2 | 0 | 0 | 20 | 9 |
| Newton Heath | 1896–97 | 29 | 9 | 8 | 5 | 4 | 0 | 41 | 14 |
| Newton Heath | 1897–98 | 8 | 2 | 0 | 0 | 0 | 0 | 8 | 2 |
| Total | | 131 | 56 | 16 | 10 | 8 | 0 | 155 | 66 |
