= Jack Peters =

English footballer

Personal information
- Full name: John Peters
- Position: Outside left

Senior career*
Years	Team	Apps	(Gls)
?–1894	Heywood Central		
1894–1896	Newton Heath	45	(13)
1896–1897	New Brompton	19	(4)
1897–?	Sheppey United		
- * Club domestic league appearances and goals

John "Jack" Peters was an association football player in the late nineteenth century. He played for Heywood Central of the Lancashire League until 1894, when he joined Newton Heath (the modern Manchester United). An outside left, he played 45 times for the "Heathens" in The Football League and scored 13 goals. In 1896 he joined New Brompton (the modern Gillingham) of the Southern Football League. He played in 19 of the club's 20 league matches in the 1896-97 season, scoring four goals, but moved on at the end of the season to Sheppey United. He married Elsie Frances Champness in Gillingham in 1897 and by 1910 had moved to Dennistoun in Glasgow where his daughter was born. By this time, Jack was working in the steel industry in Glasgow. During WWII he was living with Elsie in Ayr. No further details of his career are known.
