= Andrew Mitchell (full-back) =

Scottish footballer

Andrew Mitchell (before 1875 – after 1894) was a Scottish footballer who played at full back. He played for Airdrieonians, Newton Heath and Burton Swifts in the late 19th century.
