= Rimmer Brown =

English footballer

Personal information
- Full name: William Brown
- Position: Forward

Senior career*
Years	Team	Apps	(Gls)
- Chester
- Stalybridge Rovers
1896–1897	Newton Heath	7	(2)
1897–1898	Stockport County	28	(17)
- * Club domestic league appearances and goals

William "Rimmer" Brown was a footballer. His regular position was as a forward. He played for Newton Heath, Stalybridge Rovers, Chester, and Stockport County.
