= Willie Stewart =

Scottish footballer (1872–1945)

Personal information
- Date of birth: 11 February 1870
- Place of birth: Coupar Angus, Scotland
- Date of death: July 1945 (aged 74–75)
- Position: Half back

Senior career*
| Years | Team | Apps | (Gls) |
| | Dundee Our Boys | ? | (?) |
| ?–1890 | Warwick County | ? | (?) |
| 1890–1895 | Newton Heath | 74 | (5) |
| 1895–1898 | Luton Town | 30 | (10) |
| 1898–1899 | Millwall Athletic | 38 | (6) |
| 1899–1900 | Luton Town | 15 | (0) |
| 1900 | Thames Ironworks | 16 | (0) |
| 1900–? | Dundee | ? | (?) |
| Total | | 119 | (15) |
- * Club domestic league appearances and goals

William S. Stewart (11 February 1872 – July 1945) was a Scottish footballer who was born in Coupar Angus. He played as an inside forward before switching to his favoured half back position. He joined Newton Heath from Warwick County in July 1889. At Newton Heath, which was renamed Manchester United in 1902, he scored a goal in the club's first Football Alliance match against Sunderland Albion on 21 September 1889. On 7 April 1890, he scored Newton Heath's first ever hat-trick against Small Heath. In the 1892–93 season, he helped the club gain League status. After scoring 23 goals in 149 appearances for the Heathens, he left the club in May 1895 for Luton Town. At the end of the career, he joined Thames Ironworks.
