= John Dow (footballer) =

Scottish footballer

John M. Dow (1873 – unknown) was a Scottish footballer. His regular position was as a defender. He was born in Dundee. He played for Dundee, Manchester United, Dundee Old Boys, and Fairfield Athletic.
