= Edwin Lee (footballer) =

English footballer

Edwin Lee (born July 1879) was an English footballer. His regular position was as a forward. He was born in Altrincham, Cheshire. He played for Hurst Ramblers and Manchester United.
