= William Bryant (footballer, born 1874) =

English footballer

William Bryant (born 1874) was an English-born footballer who played as an outside forward in The Football League in the 1890s and 1900s.

He began his Football League career with Rotherham Town in the 1894–95 season.

Bryant subsequently moved to Manchester United, and made his debut for them on 1 September 1896 against Gainsborough Trinity. He went on to make 123 appearances for United, scoring 33 goals.

Bryant moved to Blackburn Rovers after his spell at United, and made his league debut for Rovers in the 1900–01 season, going on to play 25 league games for them over the next two seasons.
