= Walter Cartwright =

English footballer

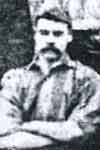

Walter G. Cartwright (born Nantwich, January 1871) was an English footballer who played at half-back.

He played for Nantwich, Heywood Central and Crewe Alexandra before signing for Newton Heath in June 1895. At Newton Heath, which was later renamed Manchester United, he played at every position, including goalkeeper and amassed 257 appearances (more than modern United heroes such as Brian Kidd, Harry Gregg, Frank Stapleton and Brian Greenhoff) in an era when the league season consisted of much fewer matches. He was one of the contributing factors in bringing Harry Stafford to the club, as well as helped support the team out of his own pocket to keep them afloat. The Nantwich man also scored eight goals for United in a spell with the club lasting from 1895 until his retirement in June 1905.

He was awarded a benefit match for 10 years' service but it came at a time when the club was in receivership. Rather than a bumper payout, he received only around £1.30 which was duly spent in the local pub before his journey home! Also an accomplished wicketkeeper for Nantwich Cricket Club. He later became publican of the Justice Birch Hotel in Hyde Road, Manchester. He died in Eccles in May 1929.
