= Dick Smith (footballer, died 1909) =

English footballer

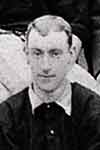

Personal information
- Full name: Richard Smith
- Place of birth: Halliwell, England
- Date of death: 18 November 1909
- Place of death: Brighton, England
- Position: Forward

Senior career*
Years	Team	Apps	(Gls)
	Halliwell Rovers	?	(?)
?–1894	Heywood Central	?	(?)
1894–1898	Newton Heath	77	(32)
1898–1899	Halliwell Rovers	?	(?)
1899–1900	Wigan County	?	(?)
1900–1901	Newton Heath	17	(2)
1901	Bolton Wanderers	0	(0)
1901–?	Wigan United	?	(?)
Total		94	(34)
- * Club domestic league appearances and goals

Richard Smith (died 18 November 1909) was an English footballer. He started his Newton Heath career in 1894. He played for the club for seven seasons, scoring 37 goals.
