= Jimmy Collinson =

English footballer

Personal information
- Full name: James Collinson
- Date of birth: 1876
- Place of birth: Prestwich, England
- Date of death: March 1940 (aged 63–64)
- Place of death: Newton Heath, England
- Positions: Full back; inside forward

Senior career*
Years	Team	Apps	(Gls)
1895–1901	Newton Heath	62	(16)
- * Club domestic league appearances and goals

Jimmy Collinson (1876 – March 1940) was an English footballer. He was born in Prestwich. Originally a full-back with the reserves of Newton Heath. Later had more success as a goalscoring inside forward. His debut came on 16 November 1895 against Lincoln City. He scored 17 goals in 71 league and cup appearances for Newton Heath. He killed himself in 1940 after losing his job as a glassblower.
