= Matthew Gillespie =

Scottish footballer

Personal information
- Date of birth: 24 December 1869
- Place of birth: Glasgow, Scotland
- Date of death: 1947 (aged 77–78)
- Place of death: Manchester, England
- Position: Forward

Senior career*
Years	Team	Apps	(Gls)
1891–1892	Thistle		
1892–1893	Blackburn Rovers		
1893–1894	Accrington		
1894–1895	Leith Athletic	14	(4)
1895–1896	Lincoln City		
1896–1900	Newton Heath	78	(17)
Total		92+	(21+)
- * Club domestic league appearances and goals

Matthew Gillespie (24 December 1869 – 1947) was a Scottish footballer whose regular position was as a forward. Born in Bridgeton, Glasgow, he played for Thistle, Blackburn Rovers, Accrington, Leith Athletic, Lincoln City and Newton Heath. His younger brother Billy was also a footballer – they were teammates at Lincoln and played on opposite sides in the Manchester derby.
