= James McNaught =

Scottish footballer (1870–1919)

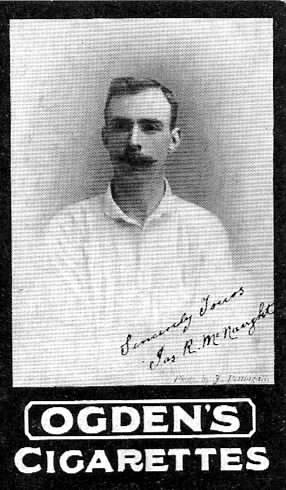

Personal information
- Full name: James Rankin McNaught
- Date of birth: 8 June 1870
- Place of birth: Dumbarton, Scotland
- Date of death: March 1919 (aged 48)
- Place of death: West Ham, London, England
- Positions: Half back; inside forward

Senior career*
Years	Team	Apps	(Gls)
1890–1893	Dumbarton	49	(10)
1893	Linfield	?	(?)
1893–1898	Newton Heath	140	(12)
1898–1907	Tottenham Hotspur	109	(0)
1907–1909	Maidstone United	?	(?)
Total		297	(24)
- * Club domestic league appearances and goals

James Rankin McNaught (8 June 1870 – March 1919) was a Scottish footballer who played as a half back.

== Career ==
McNaught began his career with his local club, Dumbarton F.C.

After a brief spell in Northern Ireland with Linfield, he joined English club Newton Heath in February 1893. Upon signing, he was given a job as a boilermaker at the Lancashire and Yorkshire Railway depot at Newton Heath, and paid £4 per week during the season and £2 per week in summer. After signing, he made three friendly appearances as an inside right in March 1893, before suffering a dislocated elbow in the third game against Ardwick. He finally made his competitive debut for Newton Heath in the first game of the 1893–94 Football League season on 2 September 1893, starting at inside right in a 3–2 win over Burnley. He played as a forward for most of the season, but was moved into the half-backs for his last four appearances of 1893–94, becoming the club's regular centre-half for the next four years.

After scoring 12 goals in 162 games for Newton Heath, he left for Tottenham Hotspur in May 1898. His contract with Tottenham drew criticism from The Cricket & Football Field, which referred to his weekly wage of £4.10s (with a signing bonus of £50 up front) as "ridiculously high". Nevertheless, while there, he helped Tottenham win the 1899–1900 Southern Football League. Towards the end of his nine-year spell with the London side, he joined their coaching staff, before moving to Maidstone United in 1907. He retired from football in 1909, but died 10 years later.

== Honours ==
Dumbarton

- Scottish League: 1890–91, 1891–92
- Dumbartonshire Cup: 1890–91, 1891–92, 1892–93
- League Charity Cup: 1890–91

Tottenham Hotspur

- Southern League: 1899–1900
- FA Cup winner: 1901

Sporting positions
Preceded by Unknown	Newton Heath captain 1894–1896	Succeeded by Caesar Jenkyns
