= Joe Cassidy (footballer, born 1872) =

Scottish footballer

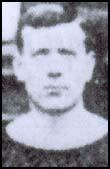

Personal information
- Full name: Joseph Cassidy
- Date of birth: 30 July 1872
- Place of birth: Dalziel, Lanarkshire, Scotland
- Date of death: 7 August 1941 (aged 69)
- Place of death: Chicago, Illinois, USA
- Height: 5 ft 10 in (1.78 m)
- Position: Forward

Senior career*
Years	Team	Apps	(Gls)
?–1890	Motherwell Athletic		
1890–1893	Blythe		
1893	Newton Heath	4	(0)
1893–1895	Celtic	28	(13)
1895–1900	Newton Heath	148	(90)
1900–1901	Manchester City	31	(14)
1901–1906	Middlesbrough	126	(33)
1906–?	Workington		
Total		337	(150)
- * Club domestic league appearances and goals

Joseph Cassidy (30 July 1872 - 7 August 1941) was a Scottish footballer who played as a forward. Born in Dalziel, Lanarkshire, Cassidy started his career with Motherwell Athletic before joining Blythe in 1890. In 1893, he was transferred to Newton Heath, where he played in the last four league games of the season, as well as a test match against Small Heath, in which he scored to keep Newton Heath in the First Division. After two months with the Heathens, he moved to Celtic. In 1895, he returned to Newton Heath, who had by now dropped into the Second Division. In seven seasons back with the club, Cassidy played 163 games and scored 99 goals. He went on to play for Manchester City and Middlesbrough. At the latter club, he would be captain for their first game at Ayresome Park, also scoring the first competitive goal at the new ground. He moved to Workington in 1906.

== Later life and death ==
Cassidy emigrated to the United States and died in Chicago on 7 August 1941

Sporting positions
Preceded by Bob McFarlane	Newton Heath captain 1892–1893	Succeeded by Unknown
