= Bank Street (football ground) =

Stadium in Clayton, Manchester, England

- Bank Lane
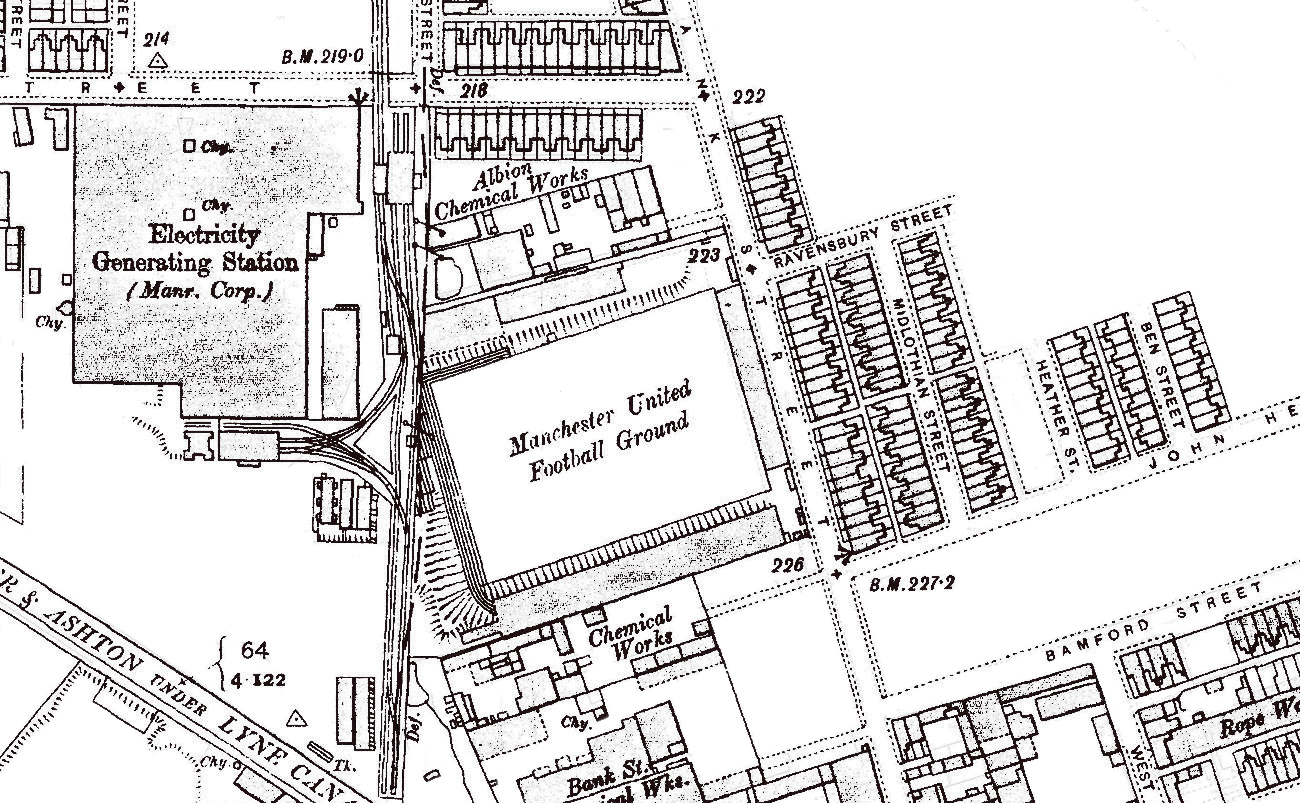
- An HM Land Registry map of Bank Street and the surrounding area (c. 1909)
- Interactive map of Bank Street
- Full name: Bradford and Clayton athletic ground
- Location: Clayton, Manchester
- Coordinates: 53°29′07″N 2°11′22″W
- Owner: Bradford and Clayton Athletic Company (–1898); Mr W. Crompton (1898–1910)
- Capacity: ~50,000
- Surface: Grass

Construction
- Demolished: 1910

Tenants
- Manchester United (1893–1910; known as Newton Heath, 1893–1902)

Bank Street, also known as Bank Lane, was a multi-purpose stadium in Clayton, Manchester, England. It was mostly used for football matches and was the second home ground of Manchester United Football Club (then known as Newton Heath Football Club), after North Road, which they left in 1893. The stadium had a capacity of around 50,000, but the club moved to Old Trafford in 1910 because club owner John Henry Davies believed he could not sufficiently expand the ground.

The stadium was in poor repair towards the end of its life and, shortly after the club moved out to Old Trafford, the main stand at Bank Street blew down in a storm. The site is now occupied by the BMX indoor arena of the National Cycling Centre, with a plaque on a house wall on Bank Street indicating the presence of the former ground. The site is close to the City of Manchester Stadium, the home of Manchester City Football Club.

== History ==
=== Early years ===
Also known as Bank Lane, the ground was located on Bank Street in the Manchester suburb of Clayton, opposite the junction with Ravensbury Street and between the railway line and the Albion Chemical works. Known locally as the Bradford and Clayton athletic ground, it was owned by the Bradford and Clayton Athletic Company. After Newton Heath F.C. (who became Manchester United in 1902) were evicted from their old ground at North Road by the Manchester Deans and Canons, who believed it to be inappropriate for the club to charge an entry fee to the ground, secretary A. H. Albut procured the use of the Bank Street ground in June 1893. The site was let to the club for eight months of the year, with pre-season training permitted on occasional nights in the summer. The ground was without stands, but, by the start of the 1893–94 season, two stands had been built; one spanning the full length of the pitch on one side and the other behind the goal at the "Bradford end". At the opposite end, the "Clayton end", the ground had been "built up, thousands thus being provided for".

Newton Heath's first Football League match at Bank Street was played against Burnley on 1 September 1893, when 10,000 people saw Alf Farman score a hat-trick, Newton Heath's only goals in a 3–2 win. The remaining stands were completed for the following league game against Nottingham Forest three weeks later. However, Newton Heath did not fare well in their first season at the new ground and were unable to retain their First Division status at the end of the season, finishing bottom of the 16-team division. At the time, the condition of the Bank Street pitch was well documented. On one occasion during the 1894–95 season, Walsall Town Swifts turned up at the ground and were greeted by what they regarded as a "toxic waste dump". After lodging an official complaint about the pitch to the referee, they were finally persuaded to take to the field, only to be beaten 14–0 (unofficially, the biggest win in the history of Manchester United). However, the Football League ruled in favour of Walsall and the match was ordered to be replayed, though the result was not much better for the visitors the second time round, this time losing 9–0.

=== Expansion ===
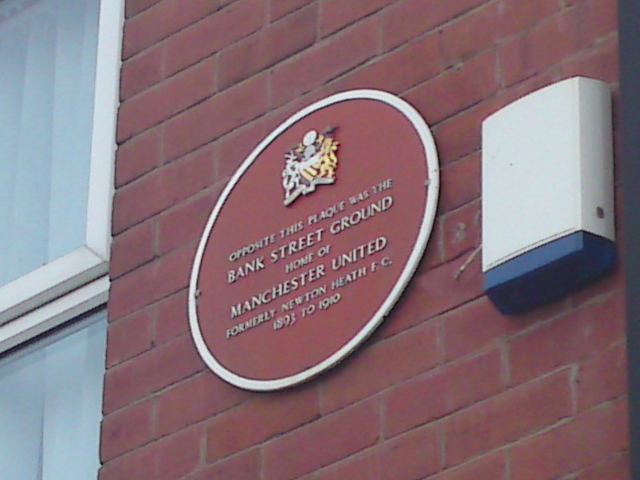
A plaque marking the former location of the ground

In October 1895, before the visit of Manchester City to Bank Street, the club purchased a 2,000-capacity stand from Broughton Rangers Rugby League Club, and put up another stand on the "reserved side" (as distinct from the "popular side"). However, weather restricted the attendance for the Manchester City match to just 12,000. Improvements to the ground were restricted by the running track that encompassed the pitch, which, by the request of the Bradford and Clayton Athletic Company, could not be removed. However, the ground came into the possession of the club's former president, Mr W. Crompton, in 1898, allowing them to make whatever improvements to it they desired. One report in the Manchester Courier predicted the addition of a 25-foot (7.6 m) tall stand on the side adjacent to Bank Street itself, with a refreshment stand underneath, while the opposite stand would be moved back 6 yards (5.5 m) and raised up on brickwork by around 16 feet (4.9 m), with the space underneath to be used as changing rooms for the players and referee and various rooms for the club committee.

These improvements would cost a lot of money, however, and this, in combination with the players' ever-increasing wages, sent the club into a period of financial turmoil. The club was presented with a winding up order in January 1902, and Bank Street was on the brink of being repossessed until they were saved at the eleventh hour by a wealthy local brewer, John Henry Davies. He and four other men, among them club captain Harry Stafford, invested a total of £2,000 in the club, now renamed Manchester United F.C., and Davies himself paid £500 for the erection of a new 1,000-seat stand at Bank Street. Within four years, the stadium had cover on all four sides, as well as the ability to hold approximately 50,000 spectators, some of whom could watch from the viewing gallery atop the Main Stand. The stadium was even deemed worthy enough to host a match between Football League and Scottish Football League representative sides in April 1904, hosting 25,000 spectators as the Football League side won 2–1.

Around the turn of the 20th century, Newton Heath pulled off a significant coup by persuading the Manchester Evening News to set up an office at Bank Street. In response to Manchester City's relationship with the Manchester Evening Chronicle, the Heathens believed that their partnership with the Evening News would cultivate interest in the club, while the newspaper would benefit from increased coverage of football.

=== Departure and destruction ===
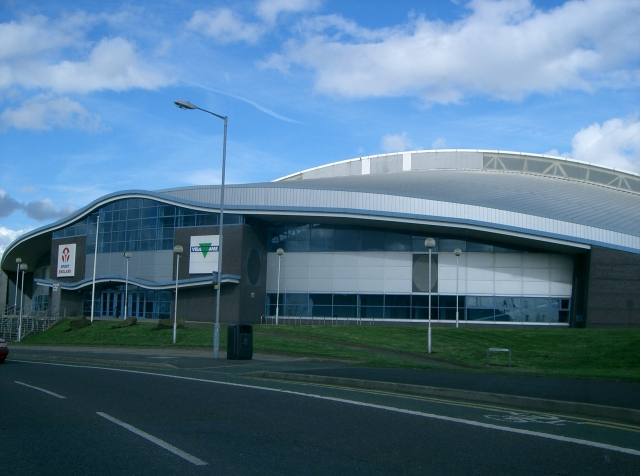
A BMX indoor arena – part of the National Cycling Centre – now occupies the site. This picture shows the neighbouring velodrome.

Following Manchester United's first league title in 1908 and the FA Cup a year later, it was decided that Bank Street was too restrictive for Davies' ambition and the club would have to move to a new stadium five miles away in Old Trafford. Bank Street was sold to the Manchester Corporation for £5,500 and leased back to the club on a monthly basis until the new stadium was complete. Bank Street played host to just 5,000 spectators for its final game on 22 January 1910; a 5–0 home win over Tottenham Hotspur. Manchester United's move away from Bank Street seemed to have come at the perfect time, as, only a few days after the Tottenham match, one of the stands was blown down in a storm. The roof of the grandstand was blown across the road, landing on the houses opposite, and the stand was left in tatters. The Tottenham match was meant to have been played at Old Trafford, but building problems at the new ground had caused the fixture to revert to Bank Street. Despite the destruction of the Bank Street End stand, the club's reserve team continued to use the ground for matches until the expiry of the lease on 1 January 1912. The remaining timber at the site was then sold to Keyley Bros. for £275. The site had various industrial uses for the next 80 years, until it was cleared in the early 1990s for inclusion in the new Manchester Velodrome (now the National Cycling Centre). It is occupied by a BMX indoor arena, opened in 2011, having previously served as a car park for the velodrome. A red plaque attached to a house opposite on Bank Street marks the site as part of United's history.
