= A. H. Albut =

English football manager

Personal information
- Full name: Alfred Hubert Albut
- Date of birth: 1849
- Place of birth: Bromsgrove, Worcestershire, England
- Date of death: 1916 (aged 67)
- Place of death: Aston, Warwickshire

Managerial career
- Years: Team
- 1892–1900: Newton Heath

Alfred Hubert Albut (1849–1916) was an English candy salesman best known for being the first full-time employee of Newton Heath, the club now known as Manchester United. He was made club secretary in 1892 and, in that capacity, took responsibility for all team affairs. Albut has been credited with keeping the club afloat during a lean financial decade.

In 1893, Albut helped the team move from North Road to the Bank Road ground.

He conducted his work from an office at 33 Oldham Road, Newton Heath, near the club's North Road ground. Albut remained in the post until 26 May 1900 and was eventually succeeded by James West after a search period. Prior to working for Newton Heath, Albut had been in the employ of Aston Villa, although in an unspecified capacity.
