= Newton Heath =

Area of Manchester, England

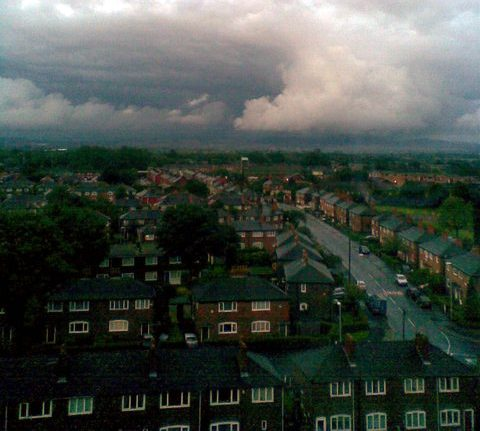
- A view over Newton Heath

- Location within Greater Manchester
- OS grid reference: SD878004
  - London: 163 mi (262 km) SSE
- Metropolitan borough: Manchester
- Metropolitan county: Greater Manchester
- Region: North West
- Country: England
- Sovereign state: United Kingdom
- Post town: MANCHESTER
- Postcode district: M40
- Dialling code: 0161
- Police: Greater Manchester
- Fire: Greater Manchester
- Ambulance: North West
- UK Parliament: Manchester Central

Newton Heath is an area of Manchester, England, 2.8 miles (4.5 km) north-east of Manchester city centre and with a population of 9,883.

Historically part of Lancashire, Newton was formerly a farming area, but adopted the factory system following the Industrial Revolution. The principal industry in the area became engineering, although many were employed in the mining and textiles industries in the thriving areas of Clayton Vale and Bradford.

Newton included what is now Miles Platting and it stretched to Failsworth. It was bounded by brooks and rivers on all four sides – the River Medlock, Moston Brook, Newton Brook and Shooters Brook. With the creation of Miles Platting the remainder of Newton became known as Newton Heath.

Manchester United has strong links with the area, having been formed from the Newton Heath Lancashire and Yorkshire Railway Football Club.

== History ==
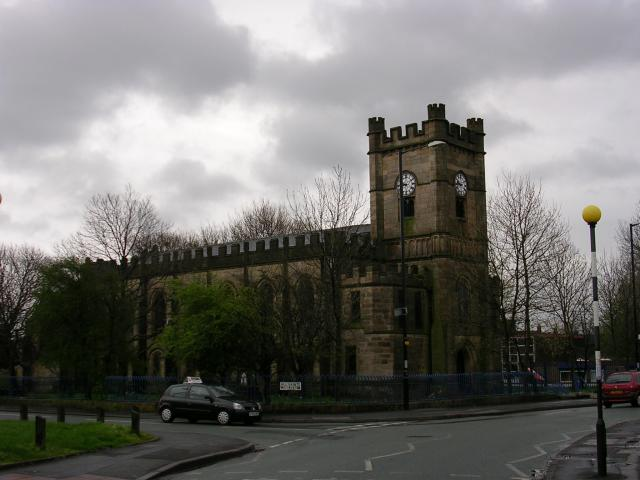
All Saints' Church

All Saints Church

Newton Chapel, later becoming the Parish Church of All Saints Newton Heath began as early as 1556, a time of great turbulence religious upheaval (Mary 1st, King Henry VIII daughter was on the throne), the inhabitants being mainly Puritan in their sympathies. It was built of wattle and daub; the first of some 8 Chapels of Ease under the Manchester Collegiate Church (MCC), the nearest other Chapel of Ease being at Gorton (later at St James). Lands owned at Newton formed part of the historic estates of the MCC.

Newton Chapel stood on a wild heath, on the highest ground and on the site of the ancient Roman Road from Chester to Manchester (this road is what is now Briscoe Lane, Gaskell Street and on a straight line through to Roman Road, Failsworth), and on to York, at its junction with the roads connecting the townships of Moston and Droylsden. Close by is the road linking the townships of Manchester, Failsworth and Oldham.

Newton Chapel was rebuilt in 1598 and an old timber found in the rubble when rebuilding in 1814, was found to have a date of 1556 carved upon it, thus 1556 being the probable date of the first building.

The first permanent Curate at Newton Chapel (All Saints), was appointed in 1598, those before 1598 being clergy sent from the Manchester Collegiate Church. This 1598 chapel was built of oak stanchions and small branches, plastered with mud, and whitewashed. The gallery was reached by a stone stairway on the outside of the building. The floor of the chapel was bare earth, and being of clay was very cold. Rushes were strewn over the floor in winter, brought in by rush carts. There were stocks close to the chapel for the use of male offenders, and from the centre of the gallery projected a circular stall where female offenders were made to stand through services as penance.

In 1738, the mud walls were replaced by brick, and interior repairs were carried out. In 1795 the building was declared unsafe as a place of worship. On Sunday 1 May 1808 an anniversary service was held in the chapel and the next morning at 6.00am, the building finally collapsed. Apparently it had been repaired some 4 years earlier and the reason for the final collapse was said to be that the repairs had been made in the winter season. Services continued amidst the dereliction, as no effort towards rebuilding was made for another 5 years.

The present neo-classical gothic building of 1814 was built to a design by William Atkinson, architect, of Manchester. An Act of Parliament authorised £3500 (equivalent to approximately £280,000 as of November 2020), to be raised by church rates on the chapelry property, and a supplementary Act authorised a further £3300 (£250,000; in total, £530,000), and pews were rented out to raise further money, The cracked bell from the old building was moved, to the new chapel of 1814 and in 1860 a new bell was installed. To show how exceptional All Saints Church is, please read below the Architects career, and it shows All Saints was his only design that was his from start to finish. The building was extended by a chancel in 1879, a gift of John Taylor of Brookdale Hall, in memory of his wife, Anne. It was adorned with an alabaster reredos completed in 1881 with fine alabaster carved panels. The church underwent major re-reordering in the late 1960s, work that probably would not be granted permission these days. Portions of the north and south galleries were removed at the east end of the nave, pews removed, a nave altar installed; choir and clergy stalls removed from the chancel to the nave; the pulpit was removed and buried in the churchyard. The nave vault and galleries were painted monochrome replacing the Victorian polychromatic scheme. This has been described by Historic England as "heritage crime". The building is currently on the "At Risk Register" of Listed Buildings maintained by Historic England. Granted by Faculty, in 1980, the church received a mid-14th century font which arrived from Covenham St Bartholomew, near Louth, Lincs.

French Huguenots settled in the area in the 16th century to avoid continental persecution, and brought cotton and linen weaving and bleaching skills with them. The arrival of textile mills saw Newton Heath's cottage industry change forever into a fully mechanised mass production system – in 1825 Newton Silk Mill (which exists to this day) was built and the Monsall Silk Dye Works followed soon afterwards.

The Rochdale Canal made movement of raw materials and finished products a practical reality. Later came other industries, including a soap works, Elijah Dixon's match manufacturing factory, and rope works as well as engineering and glass making works. Many small back-to-back low cost houses were built to house the new migrant work force. Thus was Newton changed irrevocably from a farming area into an industrial one.

The 18th century saw Oldham Road (A62) turnpiked and a toll bar installed at Lambs Lane; this road still forms the main artery through the district. With the Industrial Revolution, by the beginning of the 19th century the Rochdale Canal had been constructed and this brought industry and creeping urbanisation to the district. During the 19th century the local population increased nearly 20 fold.

From 10 February 1883 until the slum clearances of the 1970s there was a Salvation Army corps on Thorp Road.

=== Industrial history ===
Newton Heath was home to a number of famous companies such as Mather & Platt, who established a vast engineering works producing pumps, electrical machinery and fire sprinkler systems. The aircraft manufacturer Avro was also based in Newton Heath before relocating to sites at Chadderton and Woodford. Another local engineering company was Heenan & Froude, who designed and manufactured the structural steelwork for Blackpool Tower.

P. Frankenstein and Sons Ltd., a manufacturer of experimental rubberized fabrics and supplier of life vests to the Royal Air Force, had their head offices at Victoria Rubber Works, Culcheth lane on Stansfield street. The company also owned its RFD Beaufort Ltd division in Birkenhead.

The Wilson's & Co brewery on Monsall Road was founded in 1834. The company merged with rival brewer Walker & Homfrays in 1949. Wilson's and its estate of tied houses were acquired by Watney Mann in 1960. Wilson's brewery closed in 1987 when production was moved to Webster's Brewery, Halifax.

=== Manchester United ===
The parish was the birthplace of the Newton Heath Lancashire and Yorkshire Railway Football Club which was established in 1878 and later became Manchester United. It began life as a football team formed by Frederick Attock a Liverpudlian, who was a superintendent engineer of the Lancashire and Yorkshire Railway (L&YR). The team played on a pitch at North Road, and were initially outfitted in green and gold jerseys. By 1892, they had been admitted to the Football League. The club remained in the area until 1893, when it moved to new premises at Bank Street in nearby Clayton. The name was changed to Manchester United Football Club in 1902.

Newton Heath FC's biggest successes prior to the name change, were its election to the First Division on its expansion in 1892 and winning the Lancashire Cup in 1898.

=== FC United of Manchester ===
Ten Acres Lane was the proposed site of a new 5,000-capacity stadium for F.C. United of Manchester which the club intended to move into in time for the start of the 2012–13 season.

Manchester City Council gave planning permission for the stadium on 25 November 2010. However, due to local government funding cuts, the project was halted at the planning stage. Manchester City Council were forced to review their offer and the existing Ten Acres Lane site is now to be developed for other purposes. F.C. United instead moved into a partnership arrangement with Moston Juniors Football Club, building a new stadium, Broadhurst Park, in nearby Moston in 2015.

== Governance ==
An exclave known as Kirkmanshulme was part of the district. Belle Vue stands on that land, which is now only remembered in Kirkmanshulme Lane which borders it. The district was incorporated into the city of Manchester in 1890.

Newton Heath is in the parliamentary constituency of Manchester Central alongside Manchester city centre, Hulme, Beswick, Clayton, Openshaw and Moss Side. As of 2012, the seat is held by the Labour Party Member of Parliament, Lucy Powell. As of 2016, the local councillors are June Hitchen, John Flanagan and Carmine Grimshaw who are Labour Party members.

== Geography ==
Newton Heath is an urban area surrounded by Clayton, Monsall, Moston, Failsworth, Miles Platting, Bradford and Ancoats, south of the A62 (Oldham Road), the main road between Oldham and Manchester city centre.

To the south is Clayton Vale, a former centre of industry; the land has since become a rural wilderness.

== Economy ==
The town has several well-known businesses, although a number of companies have since relocated to other areas or disbanded. Princes Food & Drink Group has a soft drinks factory on Grimshaw Lane. Manchester Abattoir, on Riverpark Road, was the primary source of meat produce for the city but has gradually downsized over recent years. The 50,000-square-foot (4,600 m^{2}) central bakery of Martins Bakery is on Holyoak Street.

The town's main shopping area is on Church Street, where alongside small family-run stores there are also branches of Iceland, Asda and Lidl. The local market, once a local attraction, is now closed after a doomed attempt to upgrade the facilities led to the regular clientele finding other pitches.

== Landmarks ==
Two prominent landmarks are Philips Park and cemetery and Brookdale Park. Brookdale Park was formed in 1904 and spans over 44 acres (18 ha). The park has two bowling greens, tennis courts, and a children's play centre. Philips Park was opened on 22 August 1846 at a cost of £6,200 and was the first public park opened in Manchester. The park, covering 31 acres (13 ha), was named after Mark Philips MP who was committed to creating parks for the use of the working people of the city.

All Saints church is the oldest remaining structure in the area and can trace its history back to 1556.

Culcheth Hall, which stood alongside the River Medlock in Newton, was owned by the Byron family (of which the poet Lord Byron was a member). Other great houses once lay within the district, including Clayton Hall (owned by the Greaves family), Whitworth Hall and Hulme Hall.

== Transport ==
Railways arrived in Newton Heath during the 1840s and the Lancashire & Yorkshire Railway (L&YR) laid two main lines across the district. Steam locomotive repair sheds were opened in 1877 at the Newton Heath Motive Power Depot (now Traction Maintenance Depot), coded 26A by the London, Midland and Scottish Railway. These grew to become a major local employer which, by the 1860s, had been expanded to a 40-acre (16 ha) site with over 2,000 workers.

Both Newton Heath (closed on 3 January 1966) and Park railway stations (closed on 27 May 1995) were deemed by British Rail to be surplus to requirements following the decline of the local engineering industry.

Newton Heath is served by Newton Heath and Moston Metrolink station. It is located adjacent to the Newton Heath depot, which maintains diesel unit trains for Northern. Metrolink trams have served the area since 2012 using the Manchester-bound platform of the previous Dean Lane railway station. The line was converted from heavy rail to light rail operation as part of the Metrolink expansion project. A £35.6 million Metrolink station was built in 2005 at Central Park south of Newton Heath in anticipation of the network extension, but the project was cancelled by the Government due to funding problems until confirmation of the Metrolink conversion in 2007.

The majority of bus routes are operated by stagecoach manchester. Buses 74, 76 and 83 offer from Manchester city centre, via Oldham. Bus 171 offers from Newton Heath, via Withington Hospital. Bus 172 offers from Newton Heath, via Chorlton-cum-Hardy. Bus 184 offers from Huddersfield, via Manchester city centre. Bus 396 offers from Newton Heath, via Ashton-under-Lyne.

== Education ==
There are four primary schools, catering for children aged between 3 and 11. There are no secondary schools or facilities for further education in the area. The nearest secondary school is St Matthew's RC High School.

School	Type/status	OfSTED report	Location	Reference
All Saints School	Primary school	105505	53.499476°N 2.177171°W	
Briscoe Lane Academy	Primary school	105398	53.497950°N 2.185946°W	
Christ The King RC School	Primary school	105514	53.497949°N 2.177078°W	
St Wilfrid's CofE School	Primary & infant school	105496	53.497121°N 2.172560°W	

== Religious sites ==
Church	Religion/denomination	Leader	Location	Reference
Christ the King	Roman Catholic	Fr. Alan Denneny	53.494726°N 2.175421°W	
All Saints	Church of England	The Reverend Andrew Wickens LL.M, FRSA, ARCM	53.500109°N 2.177575°W	
Heathfield	Evangelical	???	53.500770°N 2.181289°W	
Culcheth Lane	Evangelical	???	53.499063°N 2.176947°W	
Culcheth	Methodist	???	53.499238°N 2.173188°W	
Ebenezer	Old Baptist Union	???	53.503491°N 2.176451°W	???
Strongtower	Redeemed Christian Church of God	Senior Pastor Yomi Obadimeji	53.501972°N 2.190660°W	

== Sport ==
Newton Heath Cricket club, which was established in 1859, is located on Mabel Street and affiliated with the Manchester & District and the Lancashire Cricket Associations.

Ten Acres Astro Centre is a council-run sport centre with a full-size outdoor AstroTurf pitch (marked for football and hockey) and an indoor sports hall (marked out for netball, basketball, volleyball, five-a-side football, and badminton).

A speedway training track operated in Newton Heath in the early 1950s.

== Public services ==
Policing in Newton Heath is provided by Greater Manchester Police, with a part-time station on Silk Street under the command of North Manchester (A) Division.

Newton Heath Library is on Old Church Street. It lends books and DVDs, and offers public computing facilities. The building is also used for a regular Councillors' Surgery and children's group.

Waste management is co-ordinated by the local authority via the North Manchester Household Waste and Recycling Centre which is the primary refuse depot for north Manchester.

== Notable people ==
Notable people of note who were either born and raised in the town include:

The area has produced a number of notable footballers who has distinguished careers in both the national and international game. Jimmy Collinson played for Newton Heath F.C.; George Lydon, Nobby Lawton, Cyril Barlow, Harold Hardman, played for Manchester United; Charlie Harrison played for the Bolton Wanderers; Ron Staniforth, who played in the 1954 World Cup in Switzerland, was born in the town and went on to play 107 games for Sheffield Wednesday. More recently, former Manchester United footballer Ronnie Wallwork and Blackpool F.C. Nathan Eccleston all came from Newton Heath.

Long serving Coronation Street actor Michael Le Vell was born in the area and attended Briscoe Lane school.

Artist John Houghton Hague was a principal member of The (Victorian) Manchester School of Painters in the 1870s.

Former England and Lancashire cricket captain Mike Atherton OBE was born in the town and attended Briscoe Lane school before moving to Failsworth and going on to Manchester Grammar School.

Television talkshow host and journalist Judy Finnigan was born in the parish and raised in the family home on Amos Avenue and also attended Briscoe Lane school.

Sir Harold Matthew Evans, a journalist, writer and former editor of The Sunday Times, attended Brookdale Park Junior School and then St. Mary's Rd. Central School.

Alfred Morris, Baron Morris of Manchester attended the now closed Brookdale Park High School, although Morris was originally from Ancoats.

Edith Ellis (née Lees; 1861–1916) the English writer, women's rights activist and spouse of sexologist Havelock Ellis was born in Clayton Bridge, Newton in 1861.

Buried in Philips Park cemetery is George Stringer. Stringer received a number of awards for valour including the Victoria Cross and the Serbian Milosh Obilich Gold Medal for Bravery, and was Mentioned in Despatches. Born in Newton Heath, he earned his awards at the Battle of Es Sinn during the Mesopotamian campaign of World War I.

== Cultural references ==
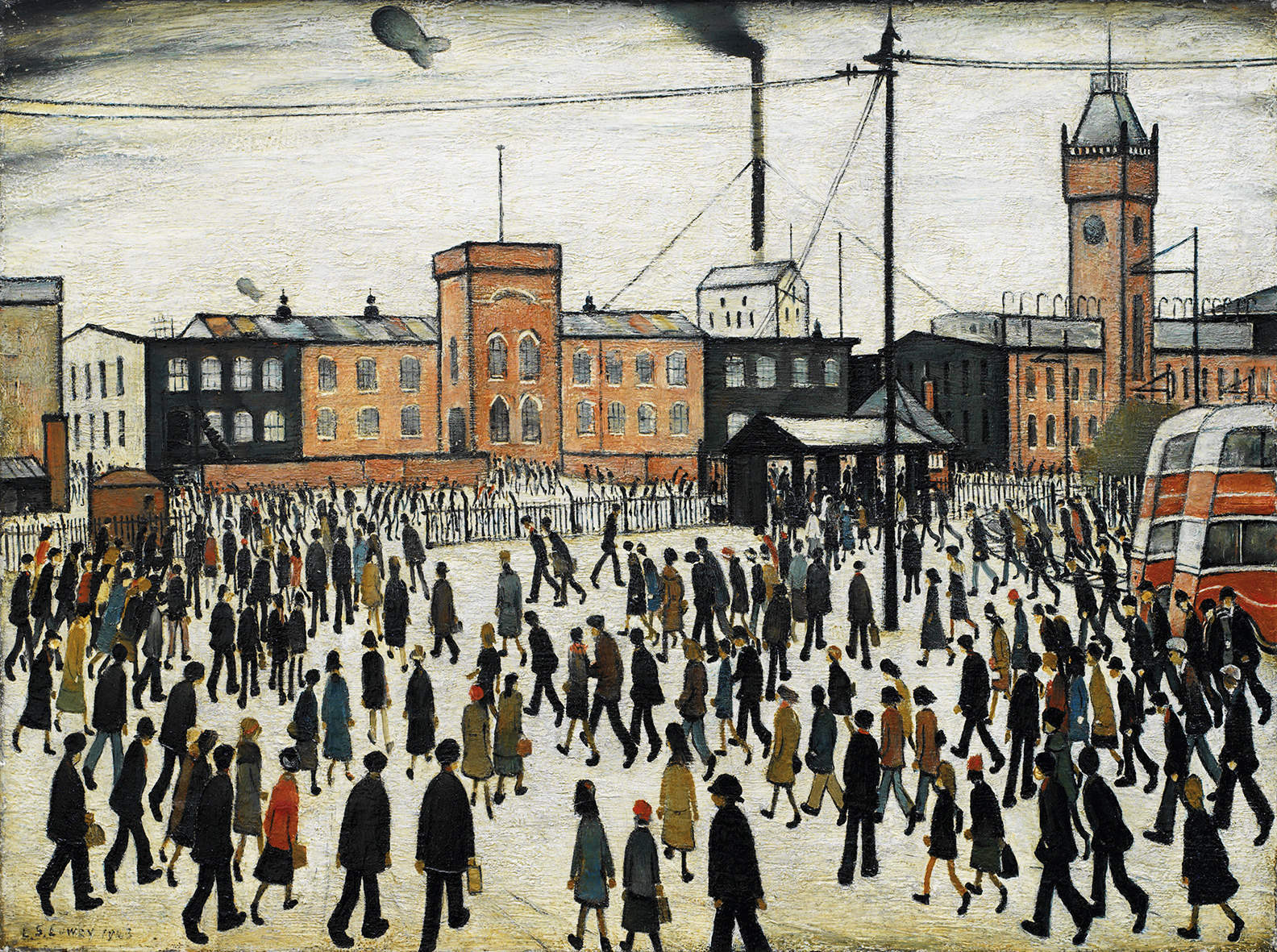
Going to Work by L. S. Lowry

In 1943, L. S. Lowry painted a picture of workers walking to the Mather & Platt's stainless steel foundry entitled Going to Work. Commissioned by the War Artists Advisory Committee, the picture is now owned by the Imperial War Museum.
