= New Moston =

Suburb of Manchester, England

Coordinates: 53.516°N 2.167°W

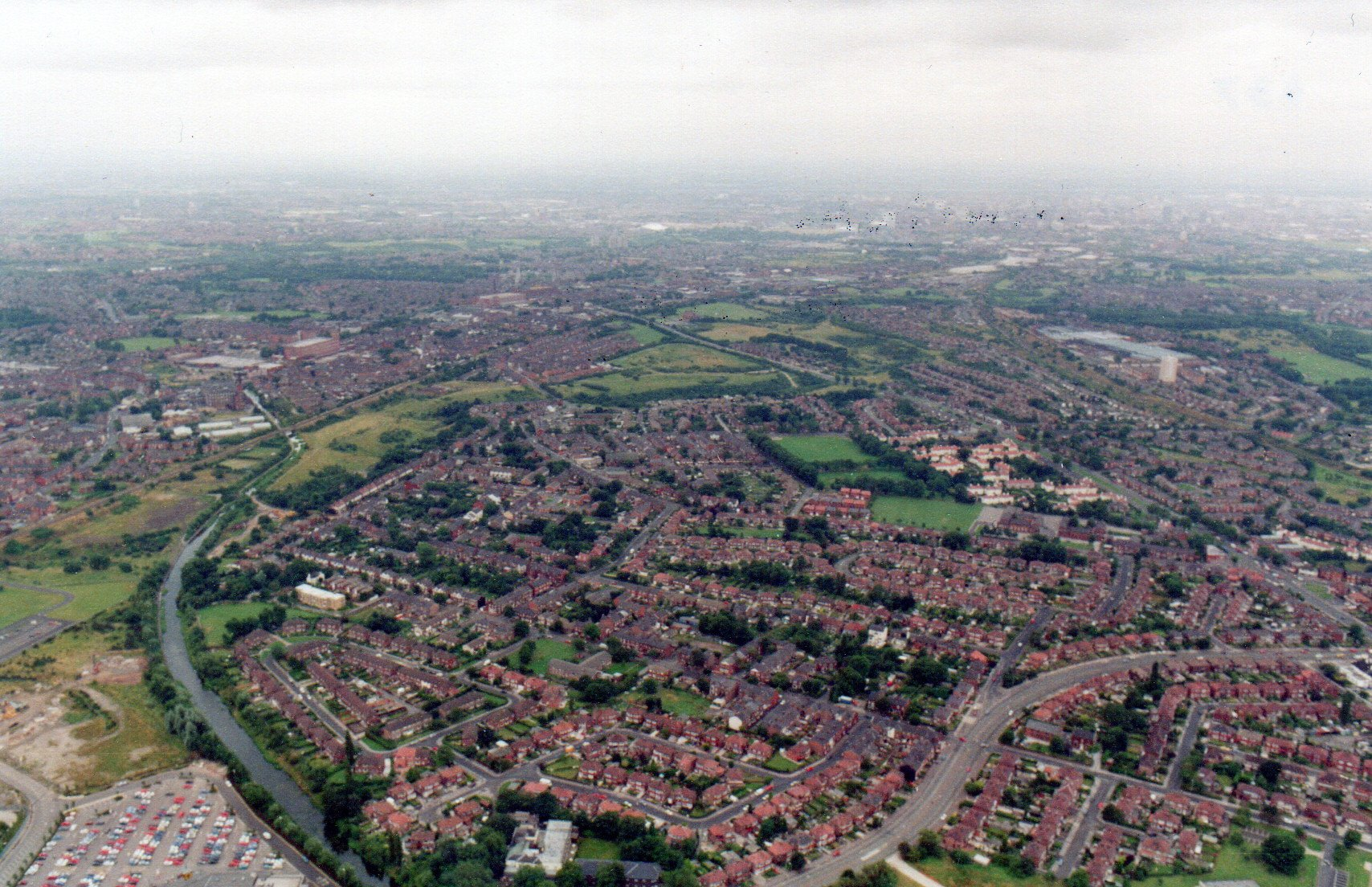
- Aerial view of New Moston in the 1990s

- Location within Greater Manchester
- Metropolitan borough: Manchester
- Metropolitan county: Greater Manchester
- Region: North West
- Country: England
- Sovereign state: United Kingdom
- Post town: Manchester
- Postcode district: M40
- Dialling code: 0161
- Police: Greater Manchester
- Fire: Greater Manchester
- Ambulance: North West
- UK Parliament: Manchester Central

New Moston is an area of north Manchester, England, four and a half miles northeast of Manchester city centre, between Moston, Failsworth and Chadderton.

New Moston Board School was founded in 1901. New Moston Primary School was later opened in the 1930s, after which the board school became the seniors. Nuthurst Park opened in 1915, following a campaign for a public park in the area by the New Moston Improvement Association. New Moston Library and Broadway Leisure Centre (formerly the "Broadway Baths"), designed by the Manchester City Architect G. Noel Hill, opened in 1932.

== History ==
The district was historically part of the Manor of Nuthurst, lying within the historic township of Moston, and was distinguished by its two manor houses, Great Nuthurst and Little Nuthurst Halls. The halls have long since been demolished but the placename Nuthurst still survives in the area in the guise of Nuthurst Road and Nuthurst Park. The archaic district of Theale Moor, lying partly in Chadderton, was also in this area. During the Middle Ages Theale Moor was the location of a violent land dispute that was only resolved when boundary stakes were set up on the common moorland.

The name 'New Moston' originates from 1850 when the Manchester Bridgewater Freehold Land Society was formed by Elijah Dixon and his colleagues, with the aim of allowing ordinary workers a chance to acquire land, for housing or allotments, away from the smoke and pollution of overcrowded industrial Manchester.

In March 1851, six holdings covering 57 acres at the “top end of Moston”, farmed by tenants of the Hilton family, of the medieval Great Nuthurst Hall, were purchased for £2,900 by the society, the aim being to divide the land into 230 plots.

A further £5,000 was invested by the society in laying out new streets to serve the plots. An access road was formed from Hale Lane in Failsworth to replace a footpath, known as Morris Lane, across the Moston Brook, which forms the boundary with Failsworth. Morris Lane ran into Moston Lane (now 'East'). The new road, connecting with Oldham Road, gave an easier route to Manchester, Oldham, or beyond.

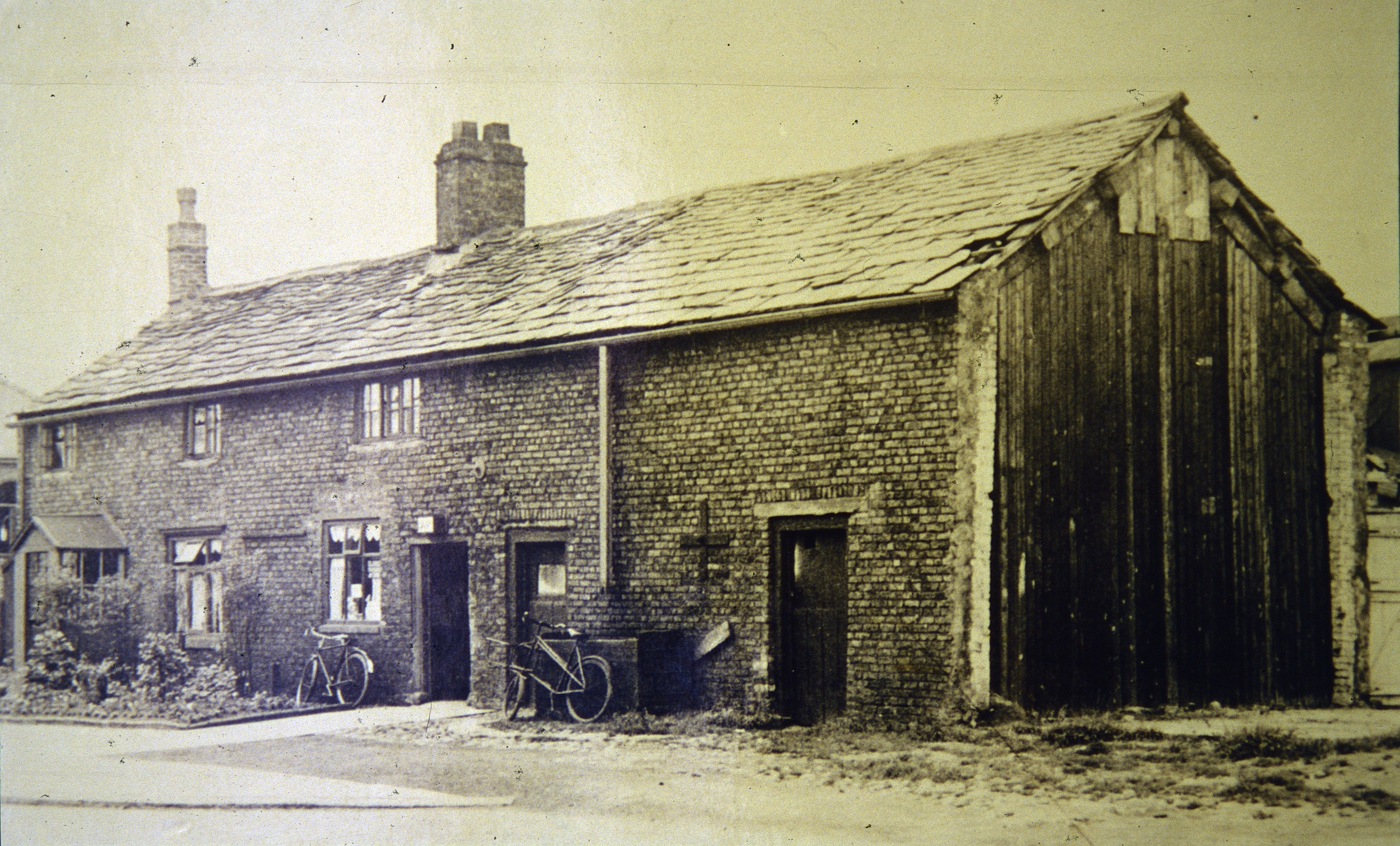
Pitts Farm, Hawthorn Road

The brook was culverted and the hollow filled in to permit a road wide, level, and firm enough to take carts and carriages into the estate at New Moston. The name chosen reflected Robert Owen's model housing schemes such as New Lanark and New Harmony.

The access road was opened in 1853 and was soon followed by the laying out of five streets: Dixon, Ricketts, Potts, Jones and Frost Streets. These were later renamed Belgrave, Parkfield, Northfield, Eastwood and – combined with the existing Scholes Lane, past Pitts Farm – Hawthorn Road(s) respectively.

By 1854, houses had begun to be built, some of the earliest surviving ones being Rose and Moss Cottages, Ivy Cottage and by 1863, a pair of cottages on Dixon Street, one of which was used as a beer house. By 1871 this was known as the New Moston Inn, and in the 20th century the two cottages were rebuilt and merged as one. The oldest building to still be standing (and in use) is Pitts Farm, Hawthorn Road, which is now two family cottages. This was believed to be built in the 18th century.

There was little change after Elijah's death, until Moston and New Moston became part of Manchester in 1890. Many little-used plots began to be sold to developers, and the next twenty years or so saw a massive expansion of housing, both within the original area, with the addition of side streets and avenues, and beyond, as neighbouring farms were gradually sold off.

Schools were built on what had been Brown's Farm, Slater Fold Farm gave way to Nuthurst Road, the park and the avenues around Hazeldene Road, and Crimbles Farm, the last to go, enabled further expansion along Moston Lane, extending right up to the Chadderton boundary.

From 1925 onwards, the building of Broadway spurred further expansion, such as the estates around West Avenue and Chatwood Road: New Moston is now much bigger than the original "top end of Moston".

== Religion ==
St Margaret Mary RC Church was founded in 1935. The current church building opened in 1957. This growing parish was formed in 1935, partly from St. Dunstan's, Failsworth, and Hollinwood parishes. It began with the celebration of Mass at the Broadway Baths until a hall was built and first occupied in June 1936. Part of the district served by the parish was given up in 1940 to help in the formation of the new parish of St. John Bosco.

St Chad (Church of England) on Hazeldene Road was founded in 1931.

Eastwood Road Primitive Methodist was founded before 1881, closing its doors in the early to mid-1970s. Since the mid 1970s the building has been used by the Full Gospel Church who celebrated 40 years at Eastwood Road in 2015.

== Failsworth Golf Club ==
Failsworth Golf Club, Nuthurst Road, New Moston was founded in 1895. It was an eighteen-hole course before and just after World War I. In about 1927, the course was reduced to nine holes when the LMS Railway (who owned the land) decided to sell a portion to Manchester City Council for housing around Chatwood Road, between Nuthurst Road and Hollinwood Avenue, which date from 1928 onward. The eighteen-hole course originally ran from Williams Road at the south end to Hollinwood Avenue at the north.

On 27 January 1914, the Manchester Courier published an article on the Failsworth Club, giving an insight into the club and a general course description at the time:

"On leaving Victoria on a stopping train one reaches Moston station in eleven minutes, and the clubhouse is only a niblick shot distant from the platform. Surely if one reckons by the time required to reach it, this must be the nearest golf to Manchester. The second impression is that the name of the club is apt to mislead strangers unfamiliar with the geography of the outlying parts of the city. Although this is the Failsworth club, the clubhouse alone is situated in that district, and, after crossing the road to the first tee, the whole of the course is in Moston."

Despite opposition from the local member of parliament a decision was made to sell the course in 1972. House building on what is now "The Fairway" commenced in 1973/4.

The original clubhouse (known locally as the 'Tin Hut') on Hollinwood Avenue still exists and is now New Moston Conservative Club, but all that remains of the northern end of the course is a path beside the railway leading to Nuthurst Road. The later clubhouse was on the south side of Nuthurst Road and lay next to the historic Little Nuthurst Hall.

== Transport ==
Multiple operators under the Bee Network operate the following bus services in the New Moston area:

- 117 bus to Piccadilly Gardens via New Moston.
- 149 bus to North Manchester General Hospital via Higher Blackley.
- 181/182 bus to Manchester city centre via Newton Heath.

Moston railway station provides journeys to the Manchester city centre and to Rochdale, Blackburn, and Clitheroe. The Hollinwood & Failsworth Metrolink tram stop are under the Oldham and Rochdale line and the South Manchester line.

== Notable residents ==
- Elijah Dixon (born 1790), the founding father of New Moston.
- Harrison Armstrong (born 1999), known professionally as Aitch, rapper, born in New Moston.
- Ian Curtis (born 1956), lead singer of Joy Division, lived in New Moston.
- James Tarkowski, footballer, born in New Moston in 1992. Attended New Moston Primary School
- Anthony Crolla boxer, brought up in New Moston
