= M postcode area =

Postcode area within the United Kingdom

Manchester
- Postcode area
- Location within the United Kingdom
- Coordinates: 53.477°N 2.270°W
- Sovereign state: United Kingdom
- Postcode area: M
- Postcode area name: Manchester
- Post towns: 3
- Postcode districts: 48
- Postcode sectors: 302
- Postcodes (live): 31,686
- Postcodes (total): 58,623
- Statistics as at May 2020

The M postcode area, also known as the Manchester postcode area, is a group of postcode districts in the North West of England.

The districts are subdivisions of three post towns: Manchester, Salford, and Sale, and cover parts of all ten boroughs of Greater Manchester, primarily the cities of Manchester and Salford and the majority of the borough of Trafford. The M postcode area is one of six with a population above 1 million.

Mail for the M postcode area is processed at Manchester Mail Centre, along with mail for the BL, OL, and SK postcode areas.

== Coverage ==
The approximate coverage of the postcode districts:

Postcode district	Post town	Coverage	Local authority area(s)
M1	MANCHESTER	Piccadilly, City Centre, Market Street, Gay Village	Manchester
M2	MANCHESTER	Deansgate, City Centre	Manchester
M3	MANCHESTER	City Centre, Deansgate, Castlefield	Manchester
M3	SALFORD	Blackfriars, Greengate, Trinity	Salford
M4	MANCHESTER	Arndale, Ancoats, Northern Quarter, Strangeways, Shudehill	Manchester
M5	SALFORD	Ordsall, Seedley, Weaste, University	Salford
M6	SALFORD	Pendleton, Irlams o' th' Height, Langworthy, Seedley, Charlestown	Salford
M7	SALFORD	Higher Broughton, Cheetwood, Lower Broughton, Kersal	Salford
M8	MANCHESTER	Crumpsall, Cheetham Hill	Manchester
M9	MANCHESTER	Harpurhey, Blackley	Manchester
M11	MANCHESTER	Clayton, Openshaw, Beswick	Manchester
M12	MANCHESTER	Ardwick, Longsight, Chorlton-on-Medlock	Manchester
M13	MANCHESTER	Ardwick, Longsight, Chorlton-on-Medlock	Manchester
M14	MANCHESTER	Fallowfield, Moss Side, Ladybarn, Rusholme, Victoria Park, Longsight	Manchester
M15	MANCHESTER	Hulme, Manchester Science Park, Old Trafford	Manchester, Trafford
M16	MANCHESTER	Firswood, Old Trafford, Whalley Range, Moss Side	Manchester, Trafford
M17	MANCHESTER	Trafford Park, The Trafford Centre	Trafford
M18	MANCHESTER	Abbey Hey, Gorton	Manchester
M19	MANCHESTER	Levenshulme, Burnage, Heaton Chapel	Manchester, Stockport
M20	MANCHESTER	Didsbury, Withington	Manchester
M21	MANCHESTER	Chorlton-cum-Hardy, Barlow Moor	Manchester
M22	MANCHESTER	Wythenshawe, Northenden, Sharston Industrial Area	Manchester
M23	MANCHESTER	Baguley, Brooklands, Roundthorn Industrial Estate	Manchester, Trafford
M24	MANCHESTER	Middleton, Alkrington, Chadderton	Rochdale, Oldham
M25	MANCHESTER	Prestwich, Sedgley Park, Simister	Bury
M26	MANCHESTER	Radcliffe, Stoneclough	Bury, Bolton
M27	MANCHESTER	Swinton, Clifton, Pendlebury, Wardley, Agecroft	Salford
M28	MANCHESTER	Worsley, Walkden, Boothstown, Mosley Common, Wardley Industrial Estate	Salford, Wigan
M29	MANCHESTER	Tyldesley, Astley	Wigan
M30	MANCHESTER	Eccles, Monton, Peel Green, Winton, Patricroft, Barton-upon-Irwell, Ellesmere Park	Salford
M31	MANCHESTER	Carrington, Partington	Trafford
M32	MANCHESTER	Stretford	Trafford
M33	SALE	Sale, Brooklands	Trafford, Manchester
M34	MANCHESTER	Denton, Audenshaw	Tameside
M35	MANCHESTER	Failsworth	Oldham
M38	MANCHESTER	Little Hulton	Salford
M40	MANCHESTER	Collyhurst, Miles Platting, Moston, New Moston, Newton Heath	Manchester
M41	MANCHESTER	Urmston, Davyhulme, Flixton, Trafford Park	Trafford
M43	MANCHESTER	Droylsden	Tameside
M44	MANCHESTER	Irlam, Cadishead	Salford
M45	MANCHESTER	Whitefield, Besses o' th' Barn	Bury
M46	MANCHESTER	Atherton, Over Hulton	Wigan, Bolton
M50	SALFORD	Salford Quays, MediaCityUK	Salford
M60 (Sectors 1 and 7)	MANCHESTER	Large user and PO Box (located geographically in M1)	Manchester
M60 (Sectors 2 and 8)	MANCHESTER	Large user and PO Box (located geographically in M2)	Manchester
M60 (Sectors 3 and 9)	MANCHESTER	Large user and PO Box (located geographically in M3)	Manchester
M60 (Sectors 4 and 0)	MANCHESTER	Large user and PO Box (located geographically in M4)	Manchester
M60 (Sectors 5 and 6)	MANCHESTER	Manchester X	Manchester
M60 (Sector 9)	SALFORD	Large user and PO Box	Salford
M61	MANCHESTER	Manchester X	Manchester
M90	MANCHESTER	Manchester Airport	Manchester
M99	MANCHESTER	Victoria, Manchester X	Manchester

== Changes ==
- M10 was recoded to M40 in 1993. Today, M10 is the postcode district for the fictional town of Weatherfield in the ITV soap opera Coronation Street, with the eponymous street having the postcode M10 9KC.
- Part of M30 was recoded to M44 in 1994 including Cadishead and Irlam.
- Part of M31 was recoded to M41 in 1994 including Davyhulme, Flixton and Urmston.
- The Trafford Centre was allocated the sector M17 8 (it is surrounded by the M41 district).
- The M90 designation has served Manchester Airport since 1994.

The M50 district of Salford was formed out of west of M5 in 2002.

== Map ==
M postcode area map, showing postcode districts in red and post towns in grey text, with links to nearby BL, OL, SK, WA and WN postcode areas.

== Former scheme ==
Before the introduction of postcodes in the 1960s, Manchester along with other major cities like Birmingham, Liverpool and Sheffield was divided into numbered postcode districts. With a few exceptions these numbers made up the outcode (the first part of the postcode). The districts were based on Manchester and Salford together and districts outside the city boundaries were also included.

For example, the City Centre had postcode districts 1–4 (north-east, south, west and north-west respectively: Manchester 1 was around Piccadilly and 4 was around Victoria). 5, 6, 7 and 8 were in Salford and then the sequence continued across north Manchester and so round to M17 (Trafford Park). M18 onwards were further out still.

== See also ==
- Postcode Address File
- List of postcode areas in the United Kingdom
