= Cyril Barlow =

English footballer

Personal information
- Date of birth: 22 January 1889
- Place of birth: Newton Heath, Manchester
- Date of death: Unknown
- Height: 1.73 m (5 ft 8 in)
- Positions: Centre-forward; full back

Cyril Barlow (22 January 1889 – ) was an English footballer who played for Manchester United. His regular position was at full back.

== Early life ==
Barlow was born in Newton Heath, Manchester, the youngest of three children of George Barlow, a baker, and his wife, Fanny. He had a sister, May, and brother, George. In 1911, he was articled to a chartered accountant.

== Career ==
Barlow began his career playing for the Manchester United junior team, playing in a match against the Irish Junior Alliance in Grosvenor Park, Belfast in 1908. He played for the amateur Northern Nomads as a centre-forward for several years, overlapping with his time on Manchester United's retained list. In 1912, he was part of the Nomads squad that went to the continent for matches in Holland and Belgium. He became a training signee for the United in 1914, but remained sidelined.

Barlow switched positions from forward to full back for the Nomads, and was set to play for Manchester United. However, his career was interrupted by the First World War. He was called up for service in March 1917 and was assigned to work in the army's accounting department. He was first sent to Scotland, where he continued training with the plan to join Heart of Midlothian. However, he was transferred to the Royal Norfolk Regiment and in September 1917 underwent surgery for a torn ligament. He was later sent to Rouen and was not discharged until December 1919. A week later he returned to training at Old Trafford, finally being signed as a professional. He was a standout player in the 1919–20 season playing right full-back.

Barlow was praised in the press for his smarts, being called "a most intelligent full back, for he relies on his skill in anticipation rather than physical powers to get him through".

He ended his career at New Cross.

== Later life ==
Barlow continued his career as a chartered accountant. He worked 45 years for Sinclair, an agricultural supplier based in Boston, Lincolnshire, and retired in 1974.
