= Broadhurst Park (public park) =

Park in Manchester, England

Coordinates: 53.514°N 2.183°W

Broadhurst Park is a large municipal park in Moston, a district of Manchester, England. It occupies approximately 80 acres.

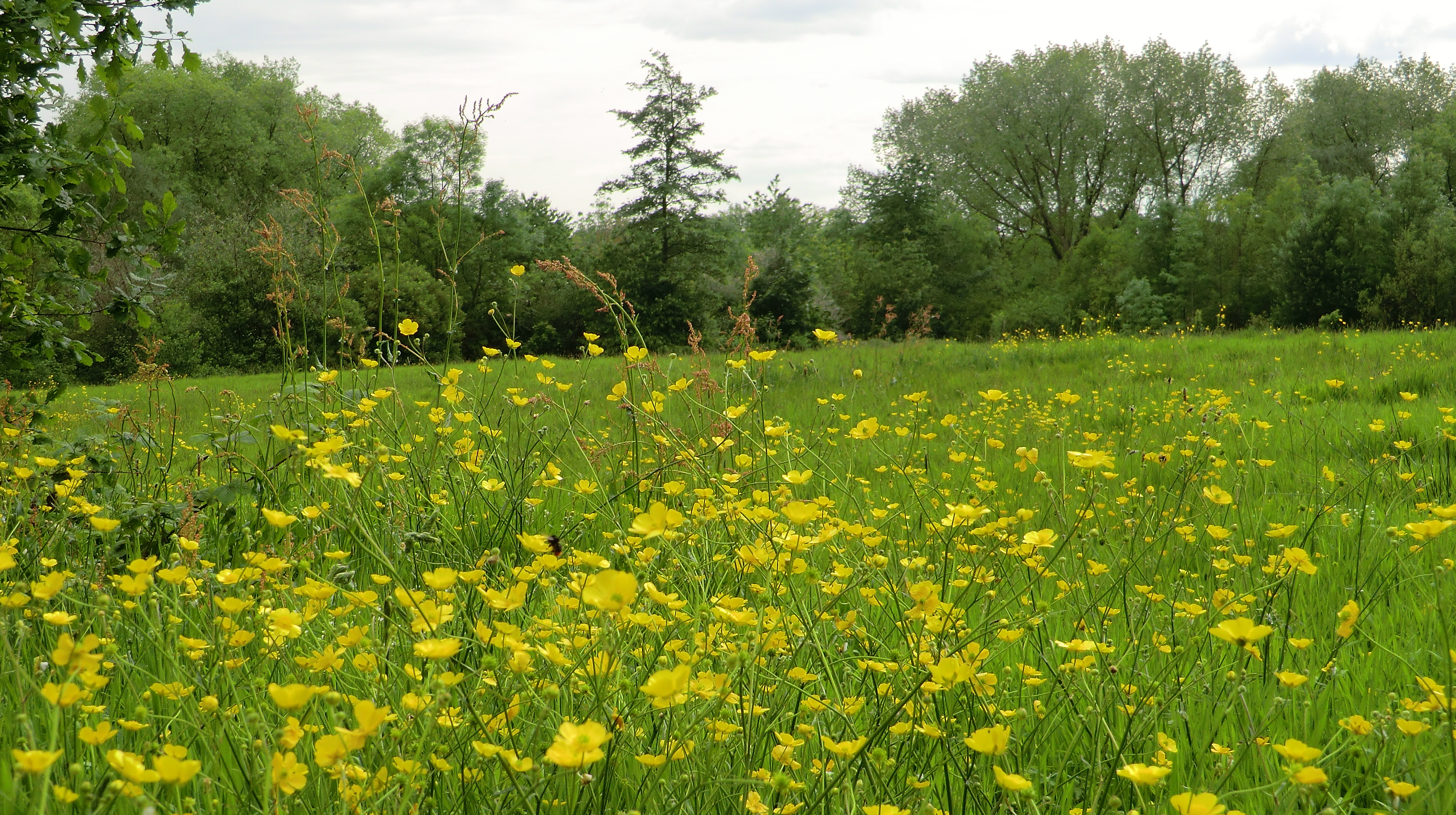
Wild flowers growing in meadow, Broadhurst Clough

== History ==
The land was donated to Manchester City Council by Sir Edward Tootal Broadhurst, a local cotton manufacturer, in gratitude for Manchester's efforts in the First World War. Sir Edward gave the land for use as playing fields and a park. The land was conveyed to the Council in June 1920.

== Description ==
The area has three parts:

- Broadhurst Park, at the north end of the site, is a formally laid out park, containing a bowling green, basketball court and playground.
- Broadhurst Playing Fields are large public playing fields to the west of the park, on the other side of Lightbowne Road.
- Broadhurst Clough is a more natural area at the southern end of the site.

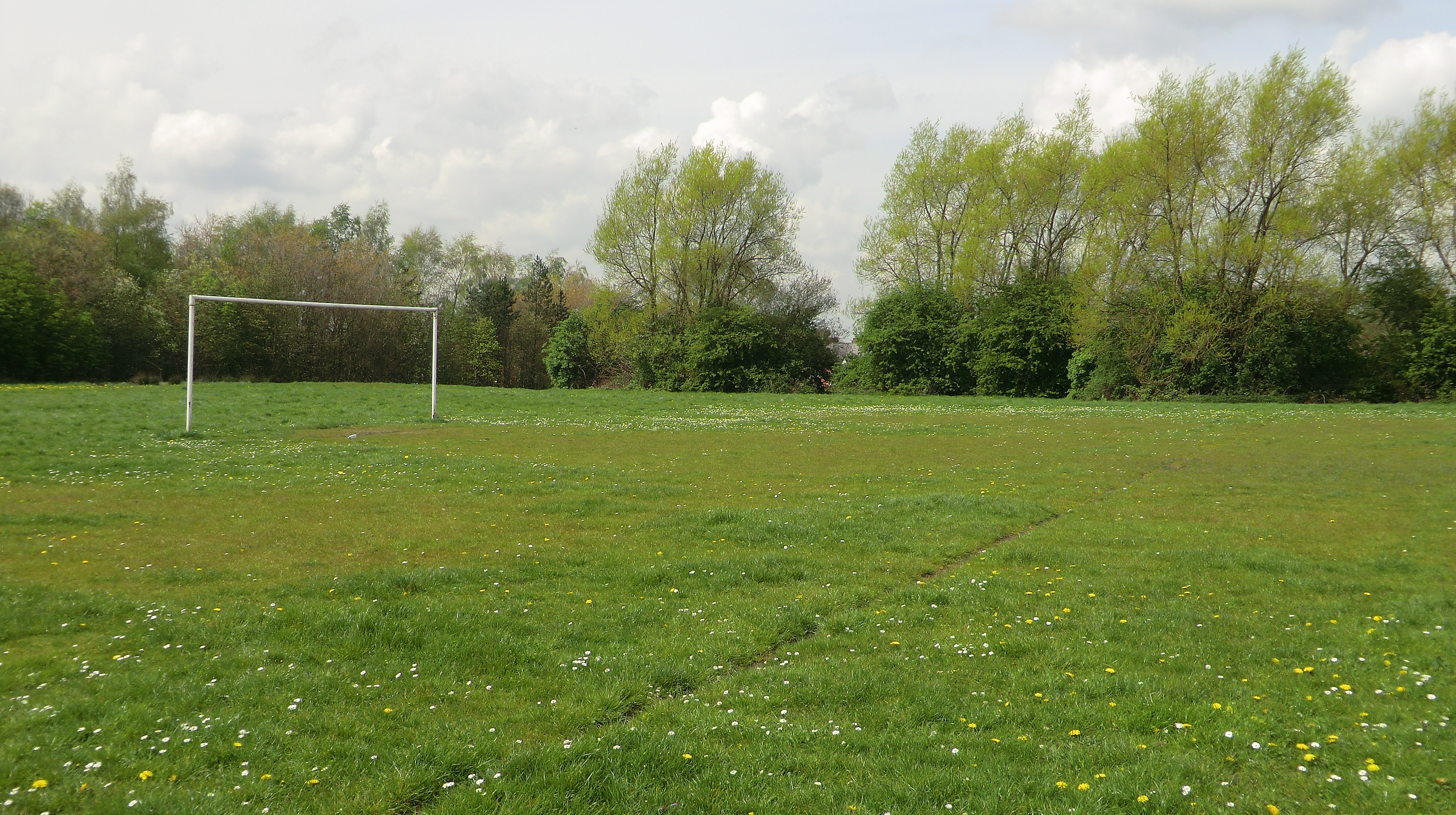
Broadhurst Playing Fields, Looking over the field towards the goalposts

Some of this area was leased by the council to local football club F.C. United of Manchester for use as a stadium of the same name and playing fields. The stadium was completed in 2015 following a controversial planning decision.

The remaining part of the Clough is a good place to walk and experience nature. Areas of grass and woodlandj, including a wetland, with over one hundred species of wildflowers. A dipping pond also hosts dragonflies. Dean Brook, a tributary of Moston Brook, runs through part of the site in a steep ravine ("clough" is a local dialect word for a steep-sided, wooded valley).

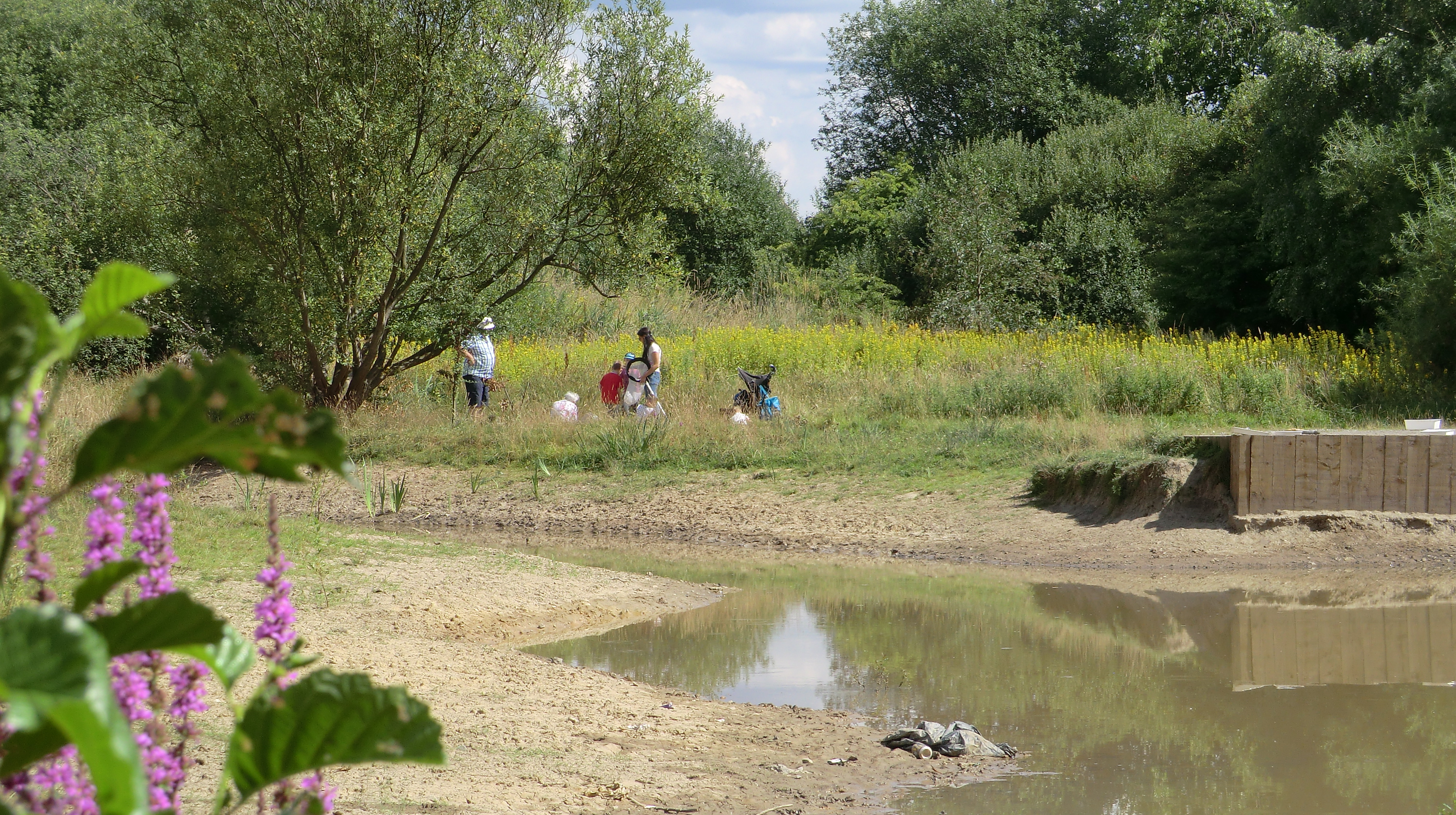
Looking across dipping pond to wooded area

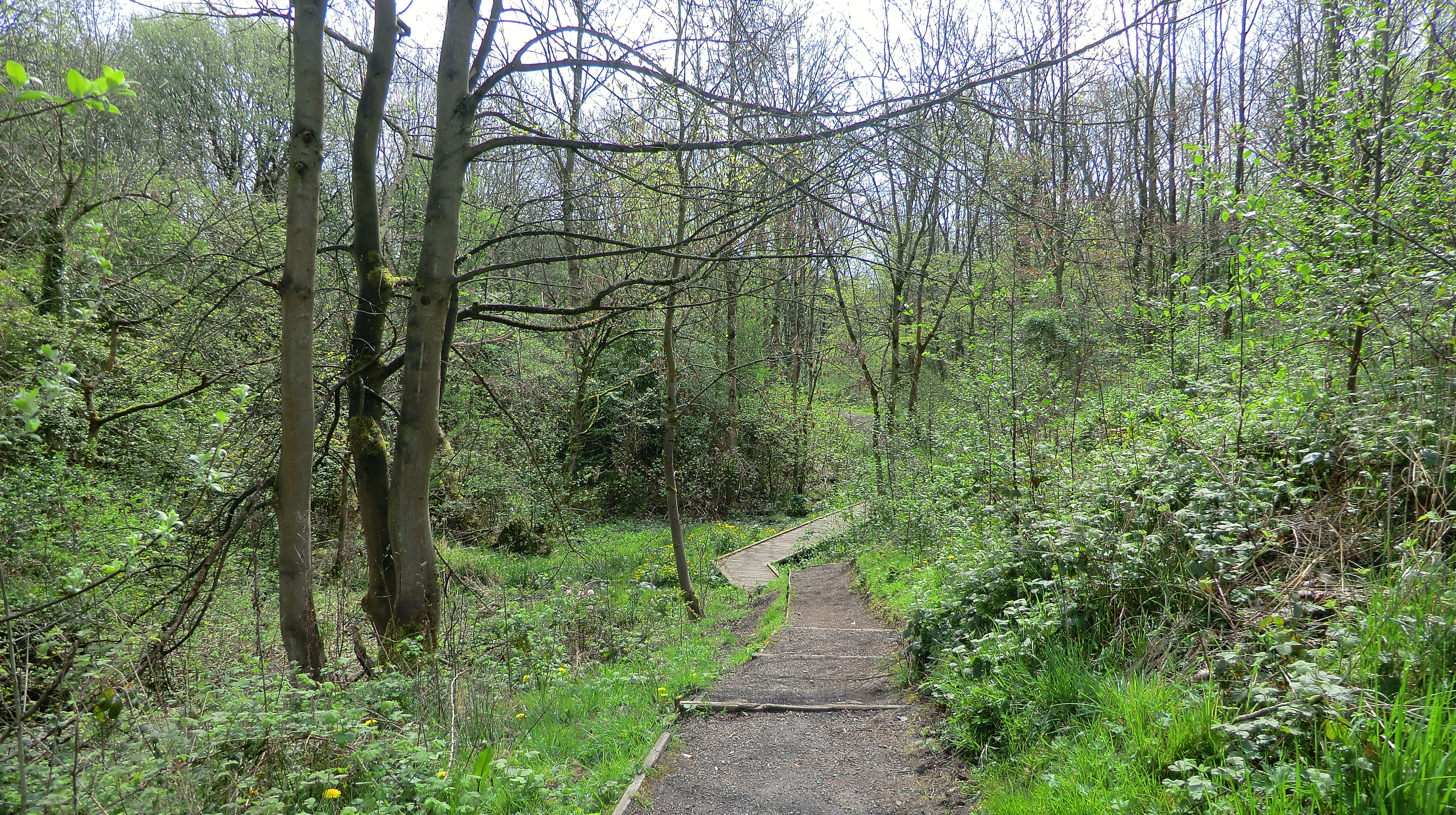
Wooded path by Dean Brook

The site is part of the Irk Valley Project Broadhurst Clough was designated a Site of Biological Importance (SBI) by the Greater Manchester Ecology Unit because of the rare wetland habitat.

The area includes the site of the former Moston Hall, which was the subject of an archaeological dig in 2003/5 by the Dig Manchester project.

The local Friends Group, The Friends of Broadhurst Park organises a summer festival in Broadhurst Fields and nature events including a bioblitz and pond dipping.
