= Elijah Dixon =

English textile worker (1790–1876)

Elijah Dixon (23 October 1790 – 26 July 1876) was a textile worker, businessman, and agitator for social and political reform from Newton Heath, Manchester, England. He was prominent in the 19th century Reform movement in industrial Lancashire, and an associate of some of its leading figures, including Ernest Jones, and his obituary claims that he was called "the Father of English Reformers". His activism led to arrest and detention for suspected high treason, alongside some other leading figures of the movement, and he was present at key events including the Blanketeers' March and the Peterloo massacre. In later life he became a successful and wealthy manufacturer. He was the uncle of William Hepworth Dixon.

== Career and activism ==
Dixon was born in Kirkburton, near Huddersfield. His family moved to Manchester in search of work, and during his youth Dixon was employed in various roles in the textile industry.

He was radicalised during the depression following the Napoleonic Wars, in which northern textile workers suffered considerable hardship.

By 1817, the authorities were sufficiently worried by rumours of an imminent workers’ uprising to suspend the Habeas Corpus Act. Dixon, who was present at the abortive Blanketeers' March on 10 March and who had been one of those behind recent petitions calling for universal suffrage, was immediately targeted as a suspected ringleader. He was arrested at his workplace, Houldsworth Mill, Newton Street, Manchester, on 12 March and transported in irons to London, where he was held in the Tothill Fields Bridewell and arraigned before the Home Secretary, the former Prime Minister Lord Sidmouth, accused of high treason.

Eventually released without trial in November 1817, he, like Samuel Bamford and Robert Pilkington who had been similarly imprisoned, petitioned Parliament individually without success for redress and recognition that the suspension of the Habeas Corpus Act had been unnecessary.

Dixon left the textile industry and tried to make a living in several other trades while continuing with his activism. He was a travelling milk-seller in August 1827 when he met the radical agitator and publisher Richard Carlile on the latter's visit to the North-West. Describing their meeting in his publication The Lion, Carlile declared that: "Elijah Dixon, separated from his religion, is one of the most benevolent and kind creatures that ever carried about him the milk of human kindness, and with the same exception, a very intelligent man."

Dixon's strong Freethinking Christian religious beliefs were, however, examined and repudiated as "insane mysticism" by the atheist Carlile, first in his initial account of their meeting and then in a subsequent issue of The Lion, in which he published and annotated a lengthy response from Dixon to the previous piece. Two years later, on 7 June 1829, Dixon attracted large crowds when he underwent public baptism by total immersion in the Peak Forest Canal.

Dixon found commercial success as a manufacturer, first of pill boxes, then of matchboxes and Lucifer matches. This latter enterprise evolved into a timber yard and match manufacturing business, known at various times as Dixon & Nightingale and Dixon Son & Evans, and later as George Evans & Son. It expanded rapidly, and by 1850 had around 450 employees.

Dixon espoused a number of popular causes of the day, including temperance and the abolition of slavery. He was a preacher and teacher, and had an interest in the developing Co-operative movement. He delivered lectures on the latter subject, including a series at Manchester Mechanics' Institution during August 1830, and on 26–27 May 1831 he chaired the first ever Co-operative Congress, held in Salford. His interest extended to Owenite-style land reform and he bought shares in at least one such project at New Moston aimed at providing building plots for homeowners who would then qualify to vote in parliamentary elections. He remained a prominent local figure in the cause of political reform; he was chairman of the Manchester Reform Association in 1832, campaigning against the proposed provisions for voter registration and Archibald Prentice records his addressing large public meetings on the subject around this time.

== Later years ==
Elijah Dixon remained politically and socially active into his later years. In 1871 he was asked to give the address at the dedication of the tomb of noted Chartist Ernest Jones, at whose funeral he had been a pallbearer two years previously alongside Sir Elkanah Armitage and the MPs Thomas Bayley Potter and Jacob Bright. He did not arrive in time for the main address, but is recorded as saying that he "had never known a man whose talents and position were so freely and distinctly sacrificed for the public good". He is also said to have remained physically fit into old age, climbing Snaefell at the age of eighty-five and dying the following year after a short illness.
