= Moston, Manchester =

Suburb of Manchester, England

Coordinates: 53.515637°N 2.184762°W

Moston
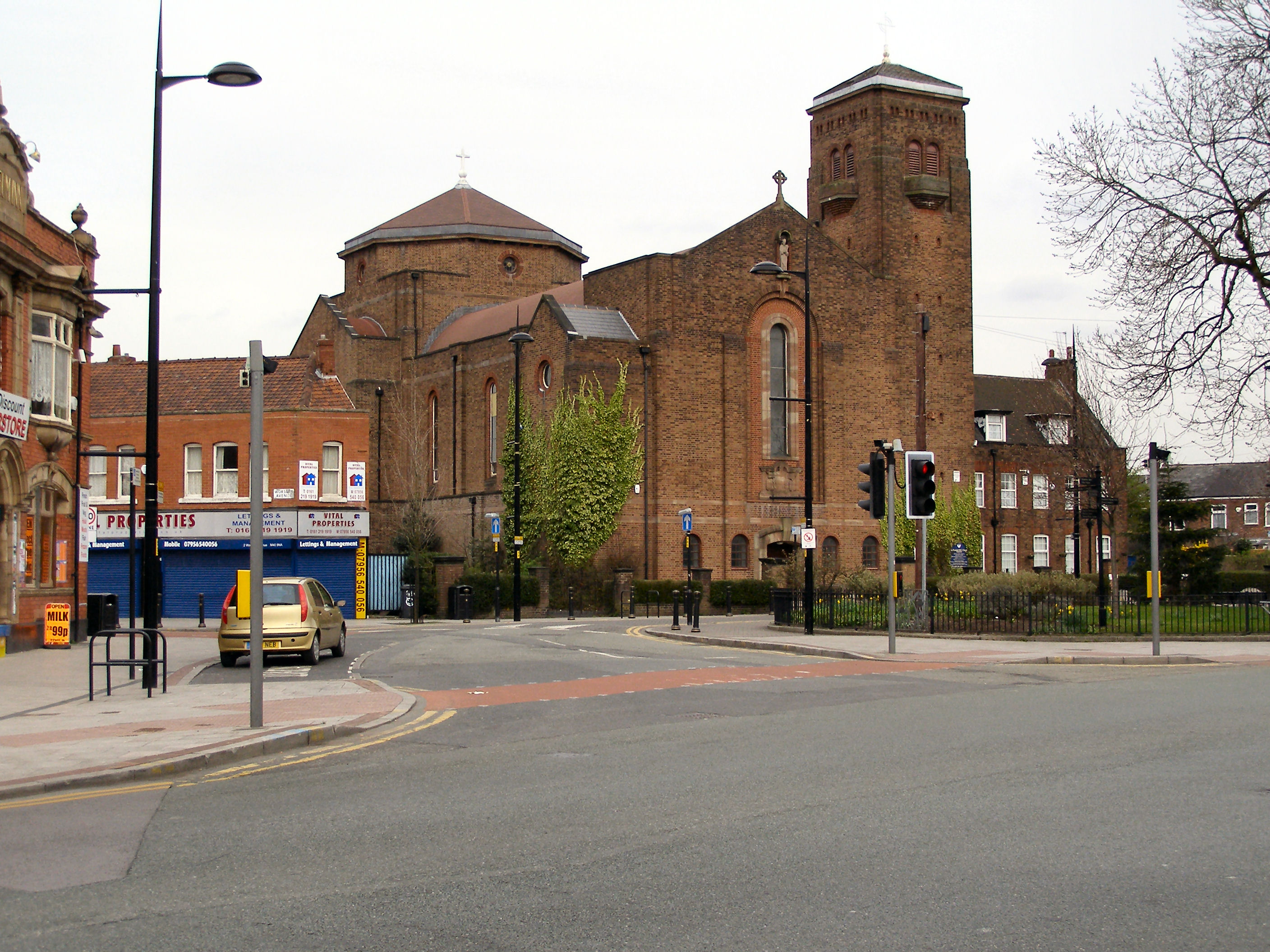
- St Dunstan's Church, Moston

- Location within Greater Manchester
- Population: 14,518 (2011)
- OS grid reference: SD877021
- Metropolitan borough: Manchester
- Metropolitan county: Greater Manchester
- Region: North West
- Country: England
- Sovereign state: United Kingdom
- Post town: MANCHESTER
- Postcode district: M40
- Dialling code: 0161
- Police: Greater Manchester
- Fire: Greater Manchester
- Ambulance: North West
- UK Parliament: Blackley and Middleton South
- Councillors: Blake Fisher (Reform); Yasmine Dar (Labour); Sherita Mandongwe (Labour)

Moston is a suburb of Manchester, in Greater Manchester, England, approximately 3 miles (4.8 km) north-east of the city centre. Historically in Lancashire, Moston is a predominantly residential area, with a population of 14,518 at the 2011 census and an area of approximately 1,300 acres (5.3 km^{2}).

== History ==
The name Moston may derive from the Old English words moss and ton, where moss usually referred to a place that was mossy, marshy or peat bog, and ton signified a town or settlement. The area of White Moss still retains these characteristics.

Historical records of Moston date back as far as 1301. The earliest historical archives are of a charter from the Lord of the Manor of Manchester, Thomas Grelle.

Although in 1320 Moston was called a hamlet of Manchester, in some deeds it is spoken of as lying within the township and parish of Ashton-under-Lyne. That the lords of Ashton had in early times rights in Moston also is shown by a fine of 1195, from which it appears that on a division Robert son of Bernard had Moston.

By the 14th century, Moston consisted of untamed countryside and agricultural settlements. In the 16th century the area saw the introduction of the linen treatment industry, with the washing and bleaching of the fabric boosting the economy throughout the area. Moston went on to become an integral part of the northern sector of 'Cottonopolis' during the 18th and 19th centuries.

The Moston Mill Print Works, which was on the junction of Williams Road and St Mary's Road, closed in 1848. Spring Valley Dye Works was sited in the area to the west to what is currently known as Lancaster Club. Extracting sand and clay from the local pits was another important industry alongside the brick works in Newton Heath. The area around Belgrave Road is known to local residents as the "White Stuff" or the "White Hills", in reference to the brickworks' waste that formed steep and unstable hills alongside the brook. These hills were reprofiled during landscaping works carried out in the early 1980s.

Increased population levels in the area resulted in the need for an increased number of residential developments.

== Governance ==
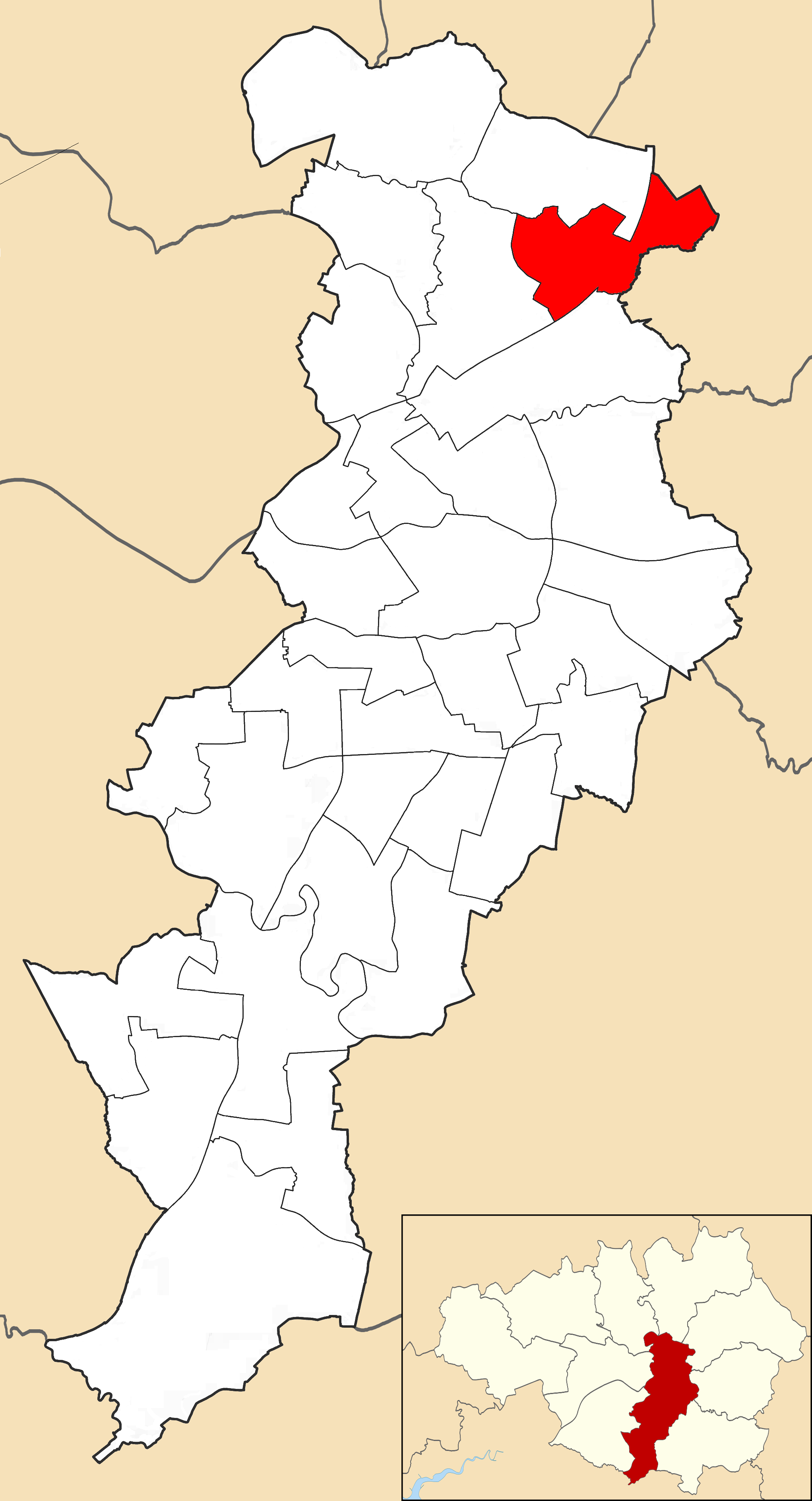
Moston electoral ward within Manchester City Council

Moston was formerly a township in the parish of Manchester, in 1866 Moston became a separate civil parish, on 26 March 1896 the parish was abolished to form North Manchester. In 1891 the parish had a population of 5179.

The town was incorporated into the parliamentary constituency of Manchester Central. Following boundary changes in 2018 part of the Moston electoral ward was within the Blackley and Broughton parliamentary constituency, represented by Graham Stringer MP of the Labour Party.

In 2024, the Blackley and Broughton constituency was abolished and replaced by Blackley and Middleton South with the parts of Moston in the Manchester Central constituency being transferred to the newly created constituency.

Councillors

Moston is represented on Manchester City Council by two Labour councillors; Yasmine Dar (Lab), and Sherita Mandongwe (Lab), and Reform councillor Blake Fisher (Ref).

Election	Councillor	Councillor	Councillor
2004	Bill Risby (Lab)	Henry Cooper (Lab)	Paul Murphy (Lab)
2006	Bill Risby (Lab)	Henry Cooper (Lab)	Paul Murphy (Lab)
2007	Bill Risby (Lab)	Henry Cooper (Lab)	Paul Murphy (Lab)
2008	Bill Risby (Lab)	Henry Cooper (Lab)	Paul Murphy (Lab)
By-election; 9 April 2009	Rita Tavernor (Lab)	Henry Cooper (Lab)	Paul Murphy (Lab)
2010	Rita Tavernor (Lab)	Henry Cooper (Lab)	Paul Murphy (Lab)
2011	Rita Tavernor (Lab)	Henry Cooper (Lab)	Paul Murphy (Lab)
2012	Rita Tavernor (Lab)	Henry Cooper (Ind Lab)	Paul Murphy (Lab)
2014	Yasmine Dar (Lab)	Henry Cooper (Ind Lab)	Paul Murphy (Lab)
2015	Yasmine Dar (Lab)	Paula Appleby (Lab)	Paul Murphy (Lab)
2016	Yasmine Dar (Lab)	Paula Appleby (Lab)	Carl Ollerhead (Lab)
2018	Yasmine Dar (Lab)	Carl Ollerhead (Lab)	Paula Appleby (Lab)
2019	Yasmine Dar (Lab)	Carl Ollerhead (Lab)	Paula Appleby (Lab)
June 2020	Yasmine Dar (Lab)	Carl Ollerhead (Ind)	Paula Appleby (Lab)
2021	Yasmine Dar (Lab)	Julie Connolly (Lab)	Paula Appleby (Lab)
2022	Yasmine Dar (Lab)	Julie Connolly (Lab)	Paula Appleby (Lab)
2023	Yasmine Dar (Lab)	Julie Connolly (Lab)	Paula Appleby (Lab)
2024	Yasmine Dar (Lab)	Sherita Mandongwe (Lab)	Paula Appleby (Lab)
2026	Yasmine Dar (Lab)	Sherita Mandongwe (Lab)	Blake Fisher (Ref)

indicates seat up for re-election. indicates councillor resigned party whip or suspended. indicates seat won in by-election.

== Geography ==
Moston is located above the midpoint of the Greater Manchester Urban Area, 3.2 miles (5.1 km) north-east of Manchester city centre. Moston is bordered by Harpurhey, to the east by Failsworth and by Newton Heath and Monsall to the south.

The town is built on a mixture of Bunter sandstone and Manchester marl (clay) that is Permo-Triassic in origin. The area is underlain with middle coal measures (mainly Carboniferous Westphalian B).

During the search for mineral deposits, geologists discovered a geological fault (known as the Moston Fault) running between Clayton Bridge and Alkrington.

Moston Brook flows through the district, forming the border with Failsworth and Newton Heath.

== Landmarks ==
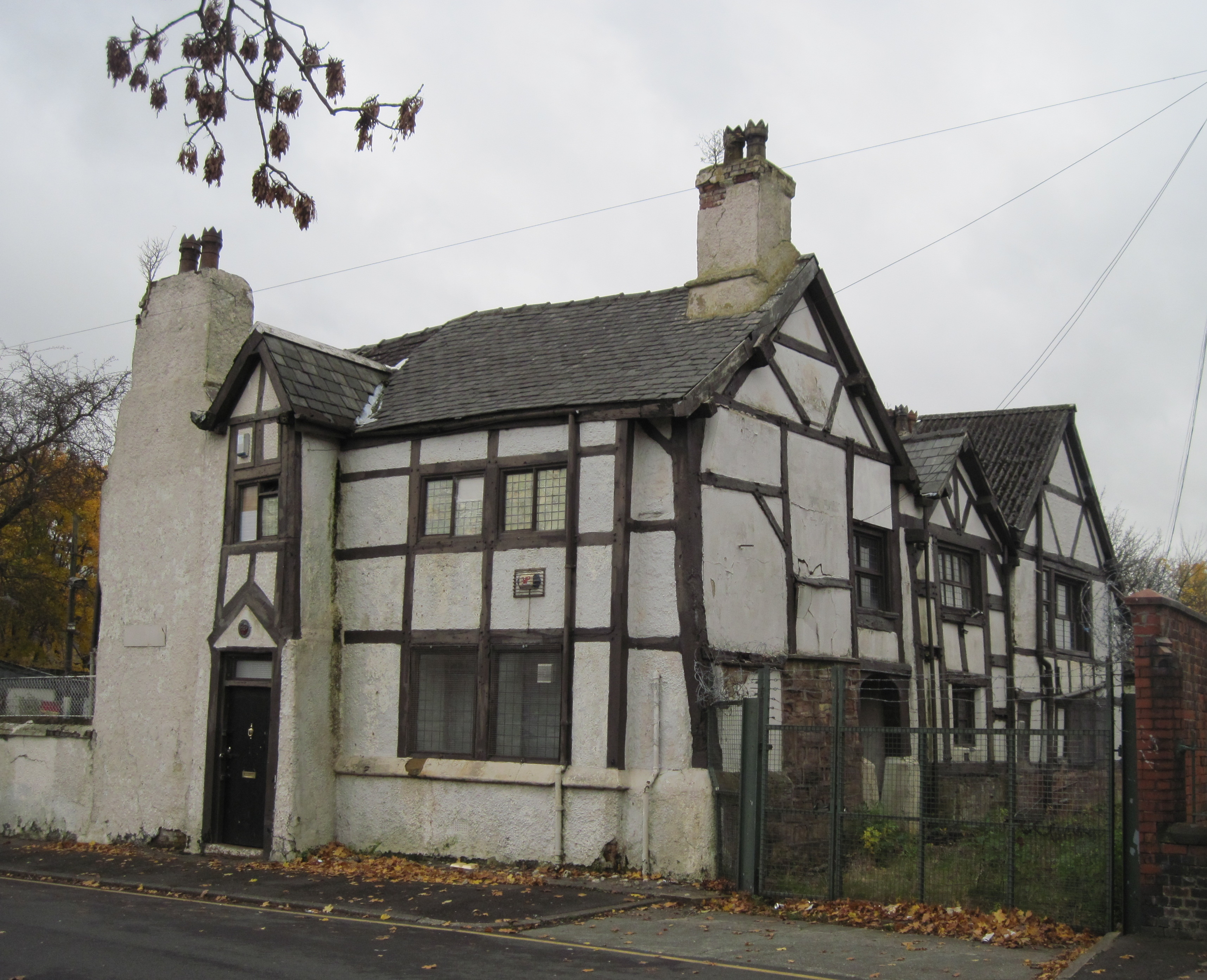
Hough Hall

Broadhurst Park was opened in 1920 and provides a range of activity opportunities and community events, including football. The park provides green space within the Irk Valley corridor. Broadhurst Park and Field stage summer funfairs and summer sports activities for children. The majority of the site is open grassland, and includes a landscaped area. The north of the park is home to recreation and community events, while the south contains woodland.

Recent drainage improvements to the football fields have greatly increased the biodiversity significance of the neighbouring Broadhurst Clough area, where the open water is home to a wide range of wildlife.

Nuthurst Park is a community park on Nuthurst Road, containing a children's playground, 5-a-side pitch, tennis court and basketball courts.

Hough Hall, on Hough Hall Road, is the oldest building in the Moston area. The Hall was listed as a Grade II listed building on 3 October 1974 and was erected in approximately the 16th–17th centuries.

== Transport ==
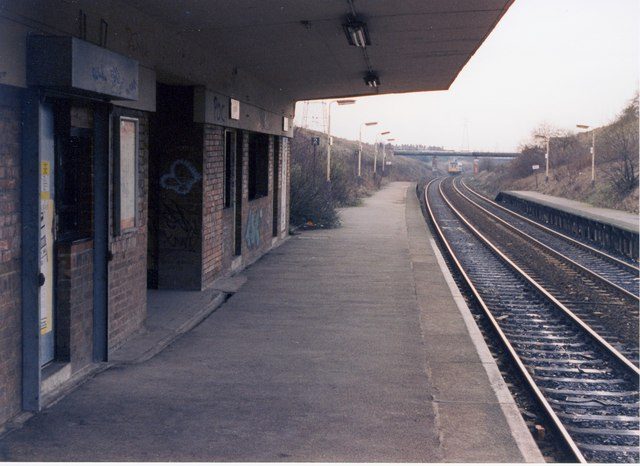
Moston railway station

Moston railway station is located off Hollinwood Avenue, in New Moston, and is unstaffed. Since the closure of the Oldham Loop Line in 2009, all trains calling at the station are on the Caldervale route managed by Northern. The area is also served by the Newton Heath and Moston Metrolink station, part of the Manchester Metrolink light rail service.

Moston is served by several bus services, primarily along Moston Lane directly to and from Manchester city centre. Bus routes from Moston also go to Middleton, Pendleton, Failsworth, Oldham, Cheetham Hill and Chadderton. The bus routes are managed by Transport for Greater Manchester (TfGM) and the Bee Network.

The road links in the area allow for easy transit to all of the surrounding districts and cities; the main thoroughfares are Broadway, which is technically part of New Moston, Lightbowne Road and Victoria Avenue. The M60 is an orbital motorway surrounding the majority of Greater Manchester; access can be gained onto it via junction 21 on Broadway.

== Education ==
School	Type/Status	OfSTED	Reference
Broadhurst School	Primary School	105451	
Lily Lane School	Primary School	105424	
Moston Fields County School	Primary School	105514	
Moston Lane Community School	Primary School	105428	
New Moston School	Primary School	105432	
St Dunstan's RC School	Primary School	105526	
St Mary's CofE School	Primary School	105496	
Lighthouse Christian School	Independent School	131354	
Manchester Creative & Media Academy	Secondary School	105562	
St Matthew's RC High School	Secondary School	105577	
One Central Park	College	N/A	
The Manchester College (Moston)	College	N/A	

The Manchester College (previously known as MANCAT (Manchester College of Arts and Technology) has a campus in Moston, which used to be known as Moston Technical College, and at One Central Park. These campuses offer further education facility for school leavers and adults. The One Central Park Campus offers courses run by Manchester NTI (New Technology Institute) in partnership with Manchester College, specialising in IT and Management and Enterprise skills.

== Religious sites ==
Religion	Percentage of population
Christian	70.4%
No religion	19.6%
Not stated	6.1%
Muslim	2.6%
Hindu	0.5%
Buddhist	0.4%
Sikh	0.2%
Jewish	0.1%
Other	0.2%

Church	Religion/Denomination	Leader	Reference
St Chad's	Church of England		
St John's	Church of England		
meeting at St John's	Christian Way of Life	Archbishop Doyé Agama and Reverend Helen Agama	
St Luke's (Lightbowne)	Church of England	Reverend John O'Connor	
St Mary's	Church of England	Reverend Matthew Calladine	
St Dunstan's	Roman Catholic	Father Martin Saunders	
St John Vianney's	Roman Catholic	Father Brian Seale	
St Margaret Mary's	Roman Catholic	Canon Kevin O'Conner	
Chain Bar	United Methodist Free	Reverend L Bishop	
Moston (Streetfold)	United Methodist Free	Reverend Margaret Mwailu	????
St Mary's Road	Methodist New Connexion		
Eastwood Road	Full Gospel	Pastor David Hughes	
Lightbowne	Evangelical		
Moston (Church Lane)	Spiritualist	Mrs A. Graham	
Deeper Life Bible	Deeper Life	Pastor Dele Adewunmi	

The oldest church still in use is Streetfold Methodist Church, which was founded in 1825. In 1907 the United Methodist Free Church merged with the Methodist New Connexion and the Bible Christians to form the United Methodist Church. In 1932, there was a further union in Britain (the 1932 Methodist Union), in which Primitive Methodists, Wesleyan Methodists and United Methodists came together as the Methodist Church.

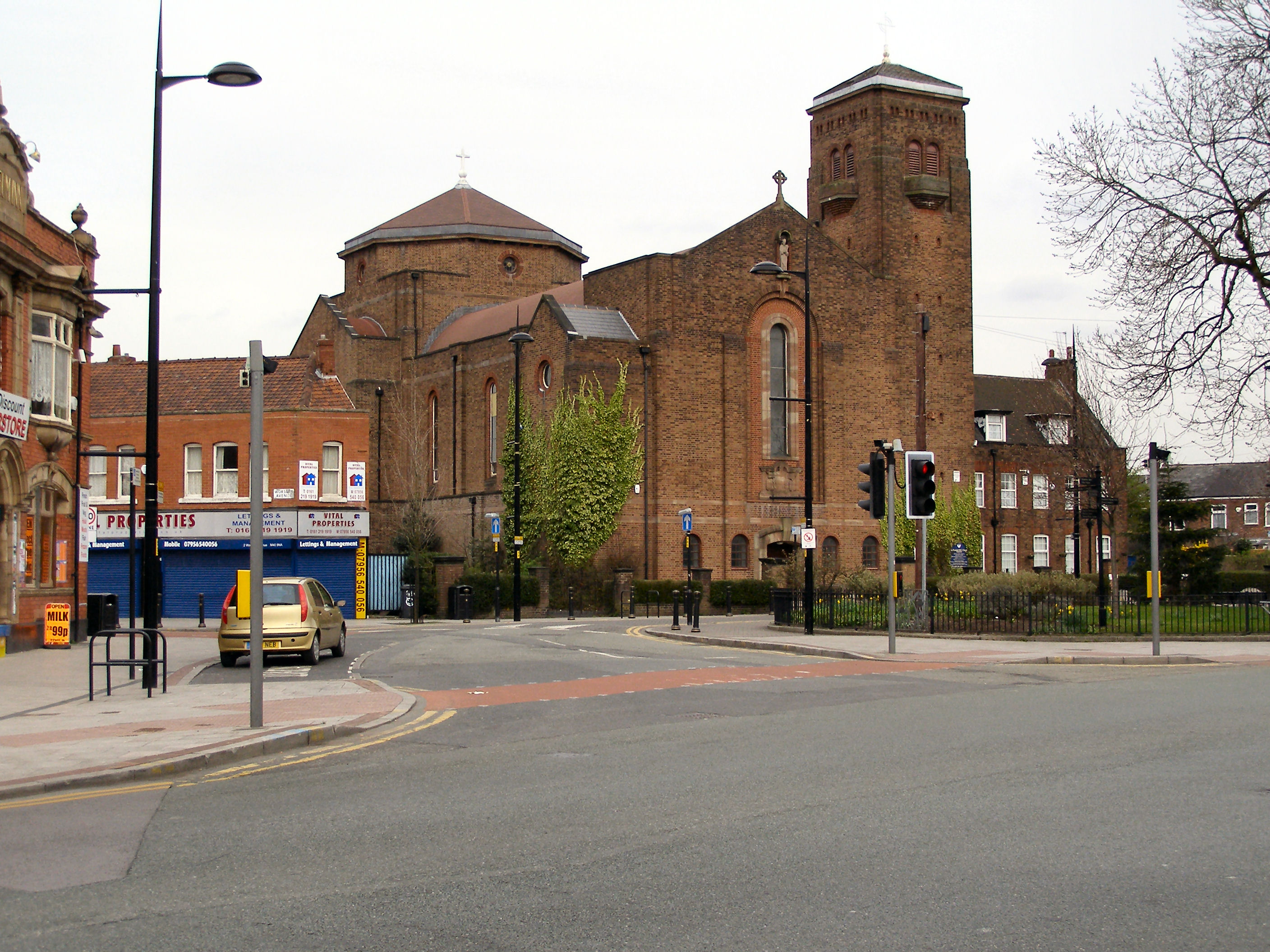
St Dunstan's Church

Roman Catholic churches in Moston fall under the control of the Roman Catholic Diocese of Salford whilst the Anglican churches, the Anglican Diocese of Manchester. Statistics state that Moston is not as religiously diverse as some other areas of Manchester.

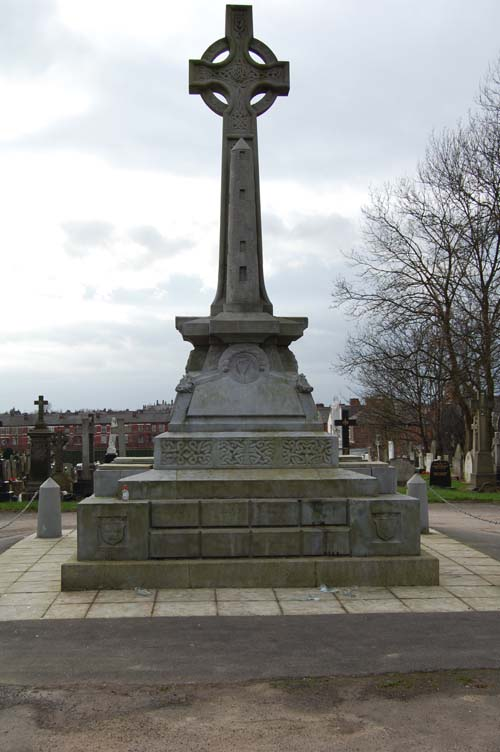
The monument in St Joseph's Cemetery in memory of the Manchester Martyrs

St Joseph's Cemetery (commonly known as Moston Cemetery) which opened in 1875, stretches out over a wide sloping site and is one of Manchester's principal Roman Catholic cemeteries. It contains the war graves of 214 Commonwealth service personnel from World War I and 144 from World War II; those whose graves have no headstones are listed on a Screen Wall memorial which also list 11 Belgian soldiers who were later exhumed and reburied in Belgium.

The Alexian Brothers Care Centre is a dual registered care home providing long-term care for older people requiring residential support and nursing care. The current building was completed in 1992 to replace the original hospital of the Alexian Brothers. The home is set within mature gardens in a secure, gated development.

The Alexian Brothers is a religious institute, originating in Belgium in the 14th century and has been closely involved with care of the elderly in the local community since first settling in Manchester in 1875. This work has continued on the same site in Moston since 1884. The Hospital Management Trust assumed responsibility for the operational management of the Care Centre in January 2006 in response to the Brothers need to step back from front line management.

== Sport ==
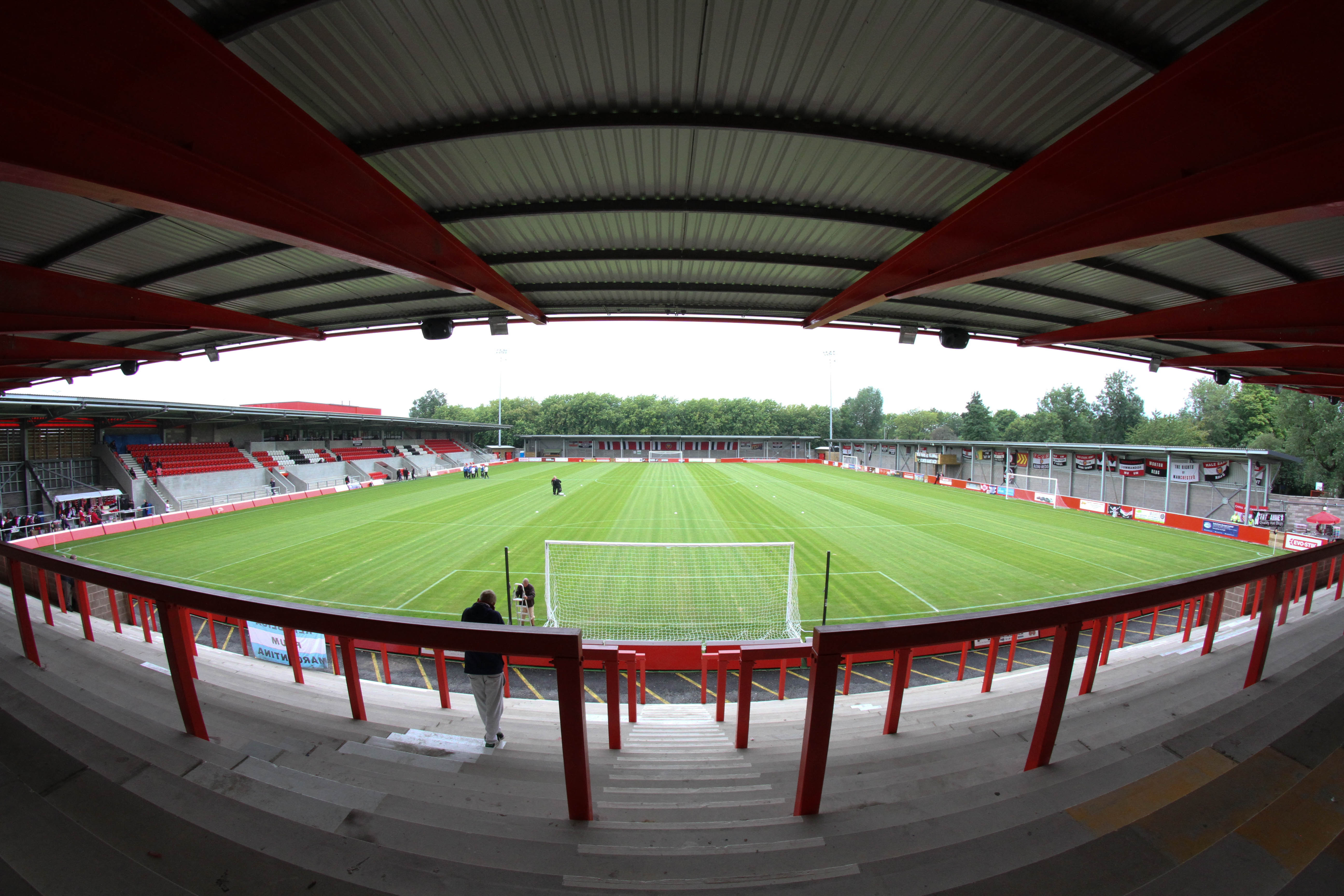
Broadhurst Park football ground

Broadhurst Park football stadium, built in 2015, is the home of F.C. United of Manchester; it is the area's non-League football club, which plays in the Northern Premier League Premier Division.

Broadway Leisure Centre has a 25m swimming pool, a fitness suite, workout studio, sun beds and sauna and steam rooms.

North Manchester Rugby Union Club are based at Tudor Lodge, Victoria Avenue East; the first team participate in the North Lancashire Division 1 league.

Moston Brook AFC is an amateur football club, which was formed in 1969 as an 'Old Boys' team to be made up of former pupils from Moston Brook High School, although the school was closed August 2000.

Moston Valley FC was established in 2002 and became an FA Charter Standard Club in 2005. The teams range from under 8s up to under 16s; all play in a variety of leagues around Manchester.

Broadhurst Bowling Club is located in Broadhurst Park and stages a summer charity competition annually of four or five bowling handicaps; this is in aid of Francis House Children's Cancer Charity and the Catholic Rescue Society.

== Public services ==
Policing in Moston is provided by Greater Manchester Police. A part-time station is located in Harpurhey on Moston Lane, under the command of North Manchester (A) Division.

New Moston Library is located on Nuthurst Road in New Moston, and aside from stocking books there are a vast number of other services and activities organised there. The site hosts a tai chi club and the Moston Midwifery Group children's groups, with the library also acting as a Parent and Carer Information point and a Health Information point.

Waste management is co-ordinated by the local authority via the North Manchester Household Waste and Recycling Centre.

== Notable people ==
Local Moston celebrities include television historian Michael Wood, social reformer and political reformer Samuel Bamford, actress Marsha Thomason who has found fame in such US shows as Las Vegas and Lost, the noted educationist Francis Smyth and Pete Mitchell from XFM, Kavana who is a singer and actor, rapper Aitch, influencer Tays , Nottingham Forest and former England Under 21 footballer, Ishmael Miller, is another notable Moston citizen. The former Manchester City attacking midfielder was known on the terraces as The Moston Menace due to his formidable physique. Another footballer, Charles Broadhurst, was also born in Moston.

Major Henry Kelly VC, MC & Bar was a Moston born officer in the Duke of Wellington's (West Riding) Regiment who saw action in the First World War. Kelly received his Victoria Cross for his action on the 4 October 1916 at Le Sars, France. He was awarded his Military Cross & Bar for subsequent acts of heroism in the war. After the war, Kelly moved to Ireland and went on to become the chief of staff for overseas operations in the Free State Army.

William Chaderton was born in the district around 1540 and was an English academic and Anglican bishop. He was the Bishop of Chester from 1579 to 1595 and then Bishop of Lincoln from 1595 to 1608 from where he went on to become Warden of Manchester College.

Indie rock band Northside is from Moston.

== See also ==
- Listed buildings in Manchester-M40

1808 – The Grand Orange Order of England was formed in Manchester with Colonel Samual Taylor of Moston as first Grand Master.

- Murder of Suzanne Capper
- Broadhurst Park (public park)
