= George Lydon =

English footballer

George Lydon (born 24 June 1902 – 12 August 1953) was an English footballer who played as a full-back. Born in Newton Heath, Manchester, he played for Nelson United, Mossley Manchester United, and Southport.
