= William Hepworth Dixon =

English historian and traveller (1821–1879)

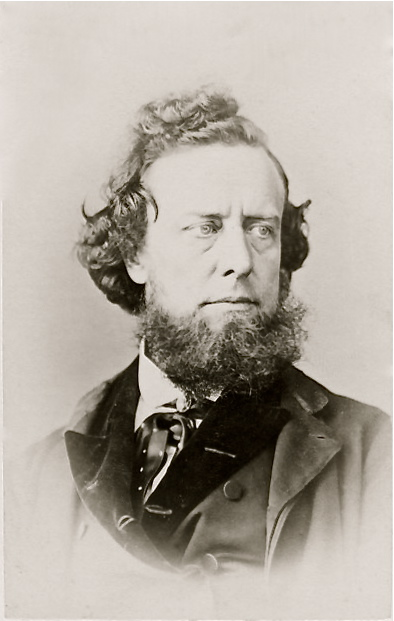
Carte de visite from about 1868

William Hepworth Dixon (30 June 1821 – 26 December 1879) was an English historian and traveller from Manchester. He was active in organizing London's Great Exhibition of 1851.

== Early life ==
Dixon was born on 30 June 1821, at Great Ancoats in Manchester to Abner Dixon of Holmfirth and Kirkburton in the West Riding of Yorkshire and Mary Cryer. His uncle, Elijah Dixon, was the reform campaigner and manufacturer. He spent his boyhood in the hill country of Over Darwen, being schooled by a great-uncle, Michael Beswick. As a lad he became clerk to a Manchester merchant named Thompson.

== Man of letters ==
Early in 1846 Dixon decided on a literary career. He was for two months editor of the Cheltenham Journal. While there he won two main essay prizes in Madden's Prize Essay Magazine. In the summer of 1846, he was advised by Douglas Jerrold to move to London. He entered the Inner Temple, but was not called to the bar until 1 May 1854 and never practised.

About 1850 Dixon became a deputy commissioner of the Great Exhibition of 1851 and started over 100 of 300 committees formed. After a tour in Europe, Dixon became in January 1853 editor of The Athenaeum, to which he had been contributing, and remained so until 1869.

== Traveller ==
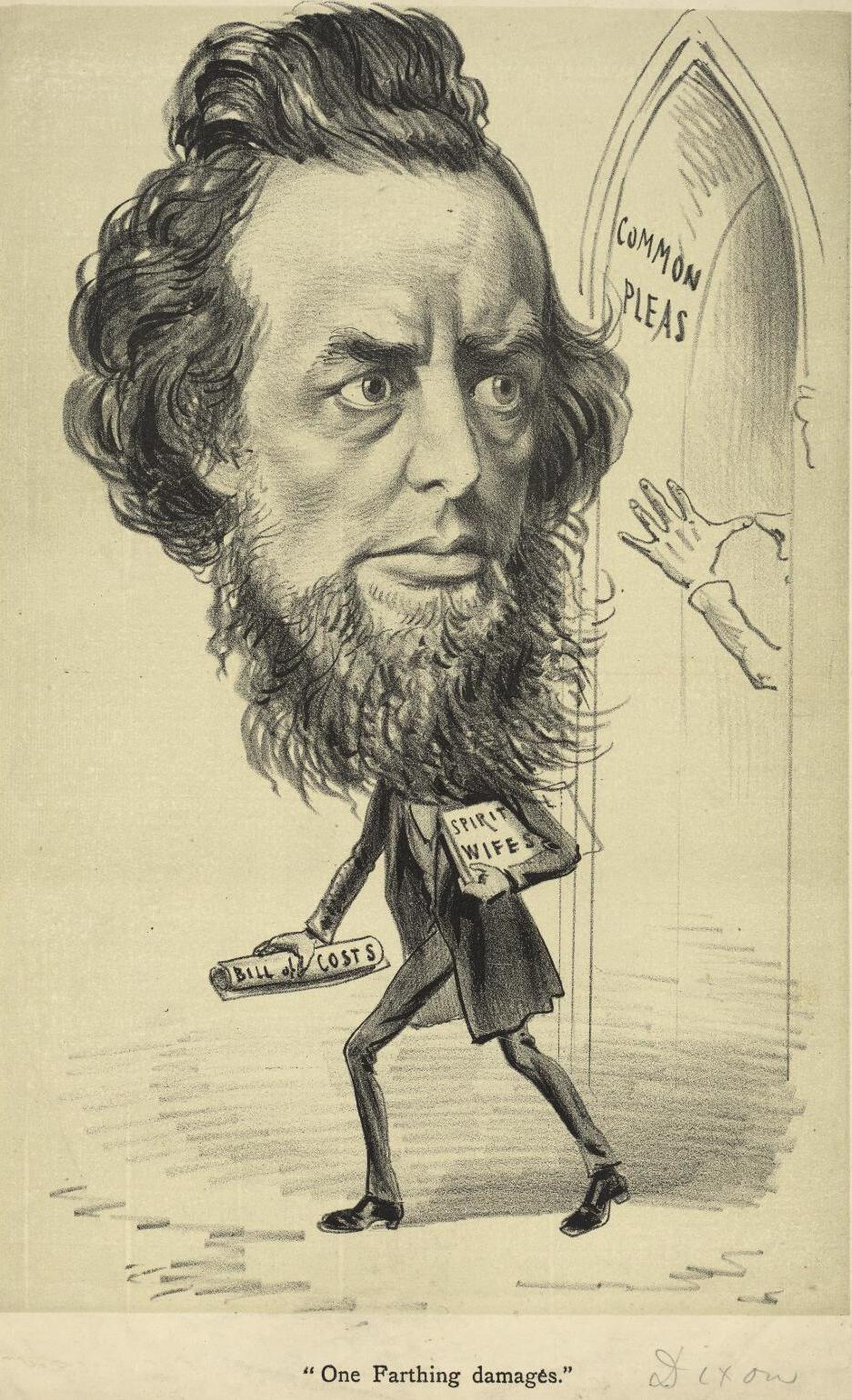
1872 caricature of Dixon entitled 'One farthing damages'

Dixon travelled in 1861 to Portugal, Spain and Morocco, and then in 1863 eastwards, returning to help in founding the Palestine Exploration Fund, of which he became an executive committee member and eventually chairman. In 1866 he travelled through the United States as far west as Salt Lake City. On the tour he lit upon a collection of state papers, originally Irish, in the public library at Philadelphia, which had been missing since the time of James II; on Dixon's suggestion it was passed to the British government.

In the autumn of 1867 Dixon travelled in the Baltic provinces, then in the latter part of 1869 spent some months in Russia and in 1871 mostly in Switzerland. Thereafter he was sent to Spain on a financial mission by a council of foreign bondholders. On 4 October 1872 he was created a knight commander of the Crown by Kaiser Wilhelm I. In September 1874 he travelled through North America, and in the latter part of 1875 once more in Italy and Germany.

== Politician and activist ==
At the general election of 1868 Dixon declined an invitation to stand for Marylebone, though he often addressed political meetings. In August 1869 he resigned the editorship of the Athenæum. Soon afterwards he was appointed a justice of the peace for Middlesex and Westminster.

Dixon took a lead in establishing the Shaftesbury Park Estate, begun in 1872. This was intended to improve housing conditions for working-class residents. He supported a number of similar projects aimed at providing low-cost dwellings of decent standard for the families of labourers, and was a member of the first School Board for London (1870), working intensively on it in the first three years of its existence. Opposing Lord Sandon, he managed to carry a resolution establishing military-style foot drill as a form of physical education in all rate-paid schools in London.

About 1873 Dixon began campaigning to open the Tower of London free of charge to the public. To this the prime minister Benjamin Disraeli assented, and on public holidays Dixon personally conducted crowds of working men through the building.

== Later life ==
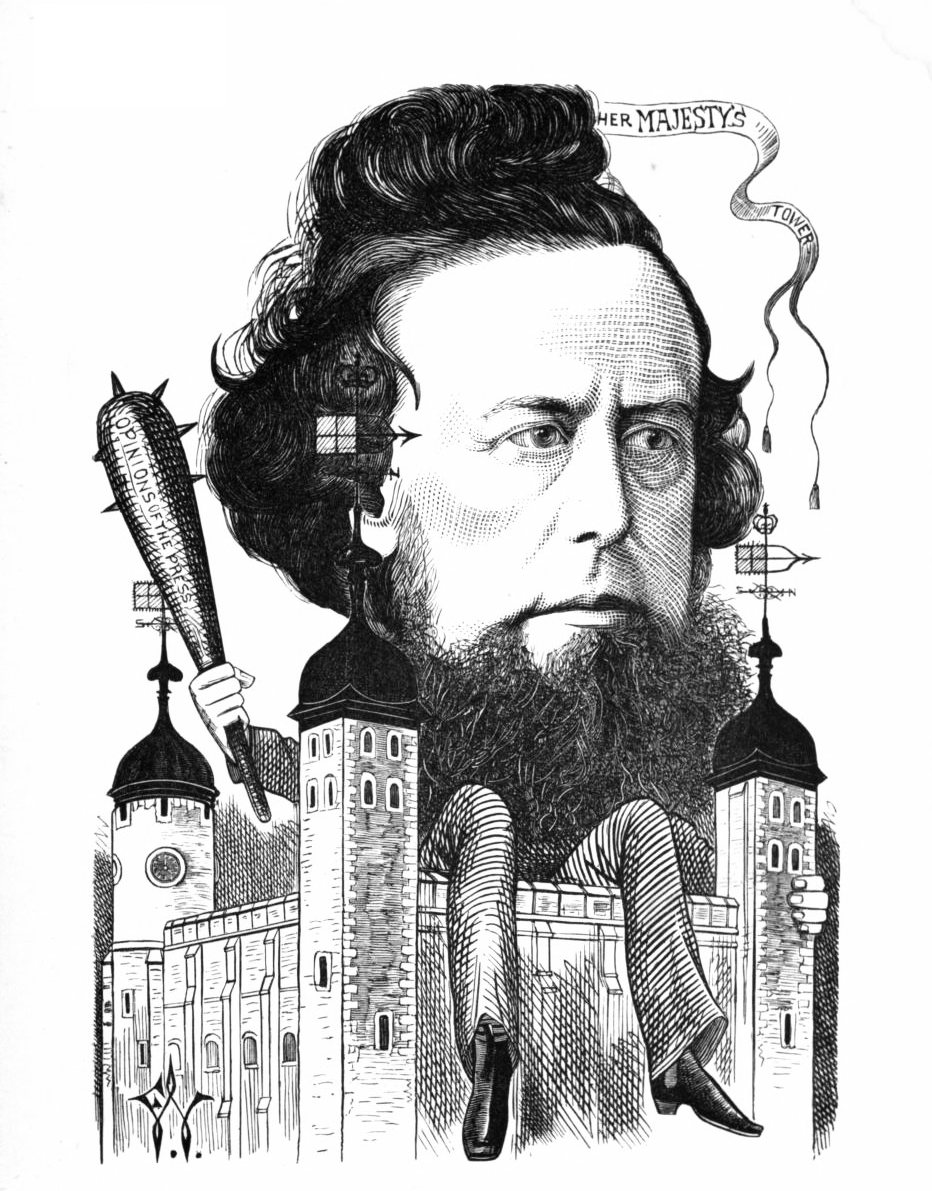
Caricature by Frederick Waddy

Dixon lost most of his savings, invested in Turkish stock. On 2 October 1874 his house near Regent's Park, 6 St. James's Terrace, was wrecked by an explosion of gunpowder on Regent's Canal. He lost his eldest daughter, and his eldest son, William Jerrold Dixon, to a sudden death in Dublin, on 20 October 1879. However, his youngest daughter, Ella Hepworth Dixon, became a writer, editor and novelist of repute.

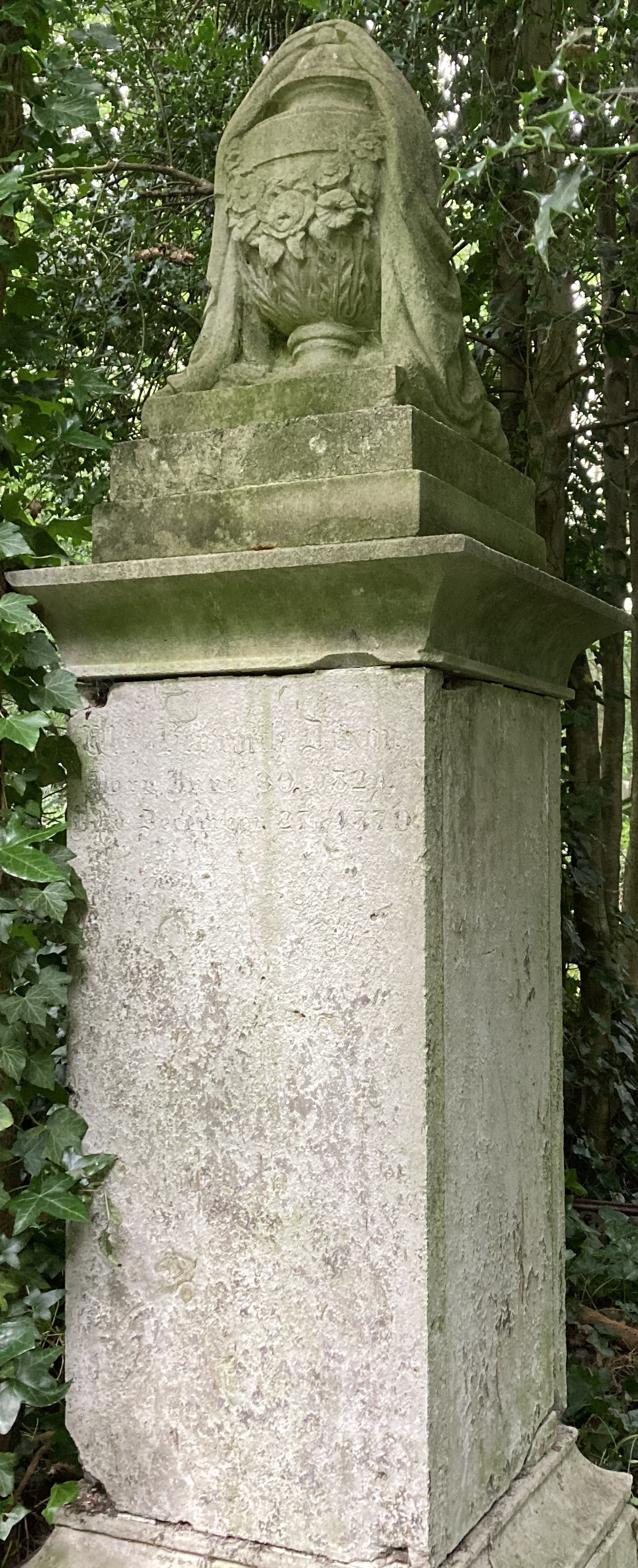
Grave of William Hepworth Dixon in Highgate Cemetery

Dixon was a fellow of the Royal Geographical Society, the Society of Antiquaries of London, the Pennsylvania Society and other learned bodies. Before the end of 1878 he visited Cyprus, where a fall from a horse broke his shoulder bone and left him an invalid. He was revising the proof sheets of the final volumes of Royal Windsor and on Friday 26 December 1879, made an effort to finish the work. He died in his bed on the following morning from a seizure. He was buried on 2 January 1880 on the western side of Highgate cemetery.

== Works ==
Before he was of age, Dixon wrote a five-act tragedy, The Azamoglan, which was privately printed. In 1842–1843 he wrote articles signed W. H. D. in the North of England Magazine. In December 1843 he first used his own name in Douglas Jerrold's Illuminated Magazine. He became a contributor to the Athenæum and the Daily News.

=== Discoveries and history ===
Dixon was criticised for inaccuracy as an author. However, he published in the Daily News a series of startling papers on The Literature of the Lower Orders, which may have suggested Henry Mayhew's London Labour and the London Poor. Another series, descriptive of the London Prisons, led to his work, John Howard and the Prison World of Europe, which appeared in 1849, and though declined by many publishers then passed through three editions.

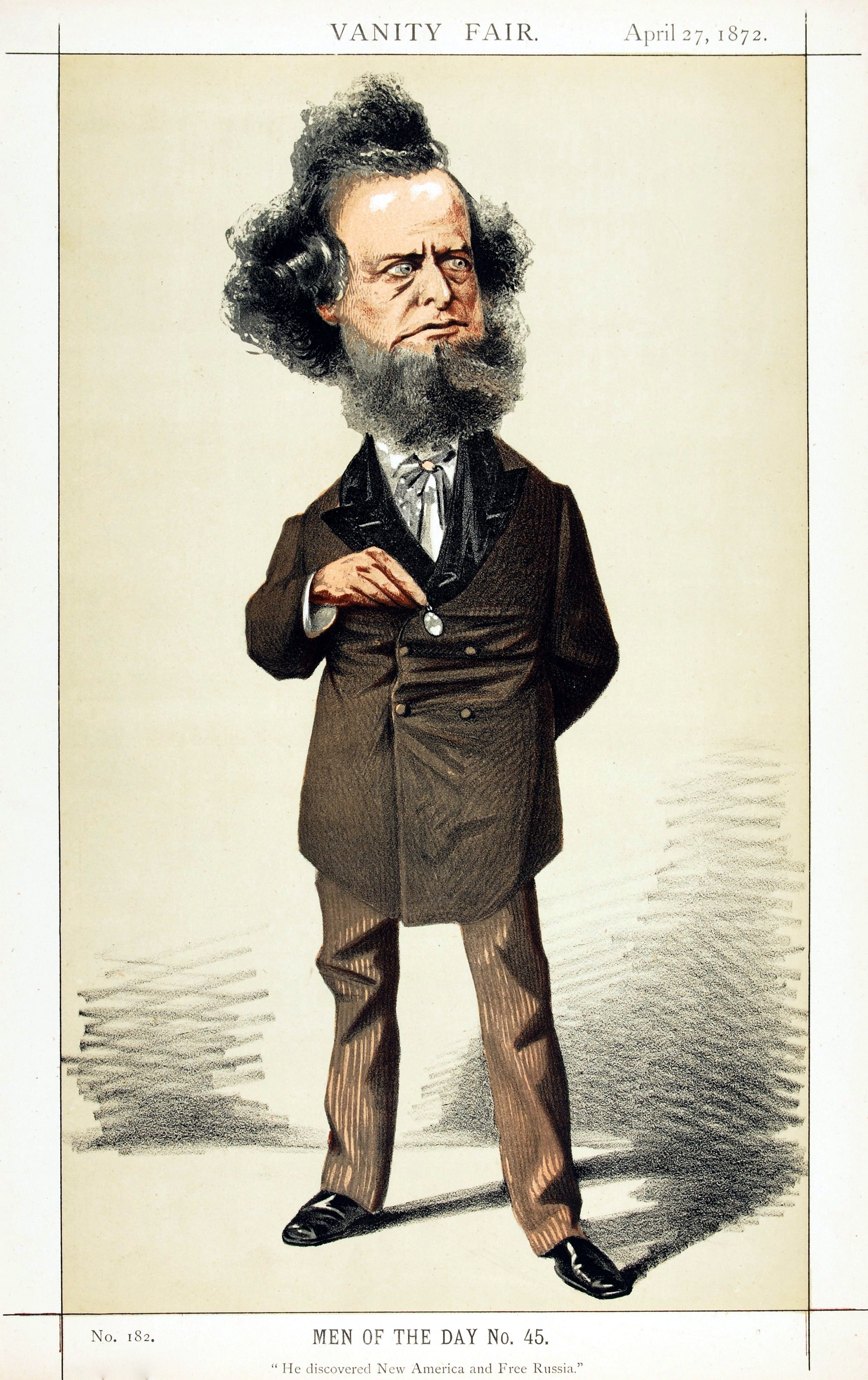
"He discovered New America and Free Russia" Dixon as caricatured by Adriano Cecioni in Vanity Fair, April 1872

Dixon's Life of William Penn was published in 1851; in a supplementary chapter, "Macaulay's charges against Penn", eight in number, were elaborately answered. Thomas Babington Macaulay never took note of these criticisms.

In 1852 Dixon published a life of Robert Blake, Admiral and General at Sea, based on Family and State Papers. In 1854 he began research on Francis Bacon. He had leave through Lord Stanley and Sir Edward Bulwer Lytton to inspect the "State Papers", until then guarded from general view by successive secretaries of state. He published four articles criticising John Campbell's Life of Bacon in the Athenæum for January 1860. These were expanded and republished as The Personal History of Lord Bacon from Unpublished Papers in 1861. He published separately as a pamphlet in 1861 A Statement of the Facts in regard to Lord Bacon's Confession, and a more elaborate volume called The Story of Lord Bacon's Life, 1862. Dixon's books on Bacon have not been valued by scholars.

Some of Dixon's Athenæum papers led to publication of the Auckland Memoirs and of Court and Society, edited by the Duke of Manchester. To the latter he contributed a memoir of Queen Catherine.

In 1869 Dixon brought out the first two volumes of Her Majesty's Tower, which he completed two years later third and fourth volumes. While in Spain Dixon wrote most of his History of Two Queens, i.e. Catherine of Aragon and Anne Boleyn. This expanded into four volumes, the first half, published in 1873, containing the life of Catherine of Aragon, and the second half in 1874 that of Anne Boleyn. In 1878 appeared the first two volumes of his four-volume Royal Windsor.

=== Religion ===
Dixon's Spiritual Wives (1868), treating partly on Mormonism, was accused of indecency. He brought a libel action against the Pall Mall Gazette, which had made the charge in a review of Free Russia. He was awarded a derogatory farthing in damages on 29 November 1872.

=== Travel ===
In 1865 Dixon published The Holy Land, a picturesque handbook to Palestine. In 1867 he published his New America, which went through eight editions in England, three in America, and several in France, Russia, Holland, Italy, and Germany. In 1872 came The Switzers. In March 1875 he wrote on North America in The White Conquest. Other books of travel were Free Russia (1870), and British Cyprus (1879).

=== Novels ===
In 1877 Dixon published his first romance, in 3 volumes: Diana, Lady Lyle. Another three-volume work of fiction followed in 1878: Ruby Grey.

=== Other works ===
During a panic in 1851 Dixon brought out an anonymous pamphlet, The French in England, or Both Sides of the Question on Both Sides of the Channel, arguing against the possibility of a French invasion. In 1861 he edited the Memoirs of Sydney, Lady Morgan, who had appointed him her literary executor. During 1876 he wrote in the Gentleman's Magazine "The Way to Egypt" and two other papers recommending the government to purchase its Egyptian suzerainty from the Ottoman Empire., In the same year 1876 he wrote a series of 5 articles about how and why Jew can and should recover Palestine, the articles are:

1- "!- Holy land and City"

2- "II - The Temple"

3- "III - Underground Jerusalem"

4- " Foundations of Zion"

5- " Scenarios of the Baptism"

In 1872 under the pseudonym Onslow Yorke he published an exposé of the International Workingmen's Association, The Secret History of "The International" Working Men's Association. After the Bolshevik Revolution it was republished by the British far right in 1921.

== Family life ==
Dixon's daughter, Ella Nora Hepworth Dixon, best known as Margaret Wynman, was a novelist and journalist.

== Collections ==
University College London holds letters from James Smith to Hepworth Dixon, editor of The Athenaeum, arguing against Augustus de Morgan's theory on the quadrature of the circle.
