= St Matthew's Roman Catholic High School =

St Matthew's RC High School

Location
- Nuthurst Road; Moston; Manchester, Greater Manchester, M40 0EW; England; 53.51901°N 2.17617°W

Information
- Type: Academy
- Religious affiliation: Roman Catholic
- Established: 1977
- Local authority: Manchester City Council
- Trust: Emmaus Catholic Academy Trust
- Department for Education URN: 148389 Tables
- Ofsted: Reports
- Headteacher: Andrew Nightingale
- Gender: Mixed
- Age: 11 to 16
- Enrolment: 1234 (as of November 2023)
- Capacity: 1,300
- Colours: Green, Gold and Purple
- Website: http://www.smrchs.com/

St Matthew's RC High School is a mixed Roman Catholic secondary school located in the Moston area of Manchester, England. The school is named after Saint Matthew, one of the Apostles and, according to Christian tradition, one of the four Evangelists.

== History ==
The school building was rebuilt during 2007-2009 and opened in September 2009. This was to replace the aging building built in the 1970s. The school celebrated 40 years open in September 2017.

Previously a voluntary aided school administered by Manchester City Council, in June 2021 St Matthew's RC High School converted to academy status. The school is now sponsored by the Emmaus Catholic Academy Trust. It continues to be a Catholic school under the jurisdiction of the Roman Catholic Diocese of Salford.

In January 2018 the school was placed into special measures by Ofsted, following the November 2017 inspection. This happened as a result of low pass rates in English and maths (in which the school ranked in the bottom 10% nationally), poor leadership, as well as behavioural and attendance issues. The school was previously judged as requires improvement in 2015, and as good in 2012. The school was reinspected in November 2022 following complaints about serious, school-wide issues, and was rated as "Inadequate" in all categories.

== Curricula ==
St Matthew's RC High School offers GCSEs, BTECs and Cambridge Nationals as programmes of study for pupils.

== Notable former pupils ==
- Peter Ash, actor
- Success Eduan, sprinter
