= Moston Brook =

Stream in Greater Manchester, England

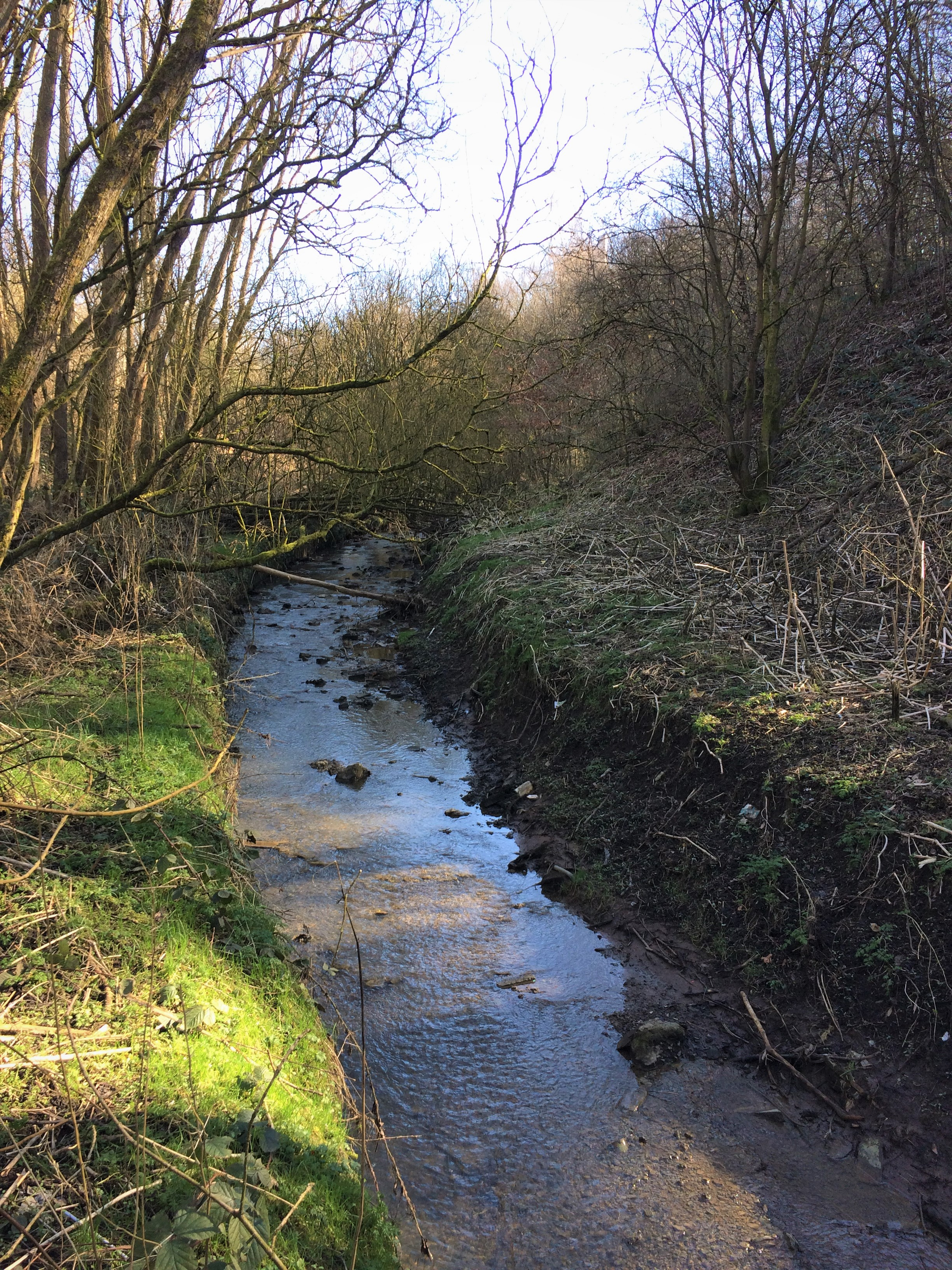
- Moston Brook near Williams Road, Manchester

- Location of the mouth within Greater Manchester

Location
- Country: England
- Region: Greater Manchester
- District: Manchester/Oldham

Physical characteristics
- Source
  - location: Failsworth, Oldham, Greater Manchester, United Kingdom
- Mouth
  - location: River Irk
  - coordinates: 53°29′47″N 2°13′39″W
- Length: 3.7 mi (6.0 km)

Moston Brook is a stream in Greater Manchester in north-west England and a tributary of the River Irk. The brook is formed at the confluence of Bower Brook and Hole Bottom Brook. This occurs near the Rochdale Canal in Failsworth in the Metropolitan Borough of Oldham. It flows southwest, forming the border between Moston, Manchester and Failsworth before being culverted almost all of the remaining route to its meeting the River Irk. It has a total length of about 3.7 miles (6 kilometres).

The river was used industrially during the Cottonopolis period of Manchester's history, such as for the washing, bleaching and dyeing of yarns, although Moston was mostly noted for silk weaving. Clay and sand pits, which once fed brickworks, were later used for landfill sites. These landfills were later expanded by culverting the brook, though the last one closed in the 1990s. The brook's heavy industrial use and urban location led to it becoming badly polluted. In the early 2000s, the brook was identified as one of the most polluted bodies of water in Greater Manchester, if not the whole of the North West of England. However, this was the beginning of an ongoing concerted effort to enhance the water quality of the brook. This included work to divert and renovate combined sewer overflows, and the installation of drainage channels to divert surface water from nearby industrial sites and leachate from historic landfills. Work continues to improve the environment around the brook. Reprofiling and landscaping in the 1980s and environmental improvements in the 21st century mean that the brook is now seen as a community asset and an area of biodiversity. The remaining parts of the brook that avoided being culverted are used for recreation by the local community.

== Course ==
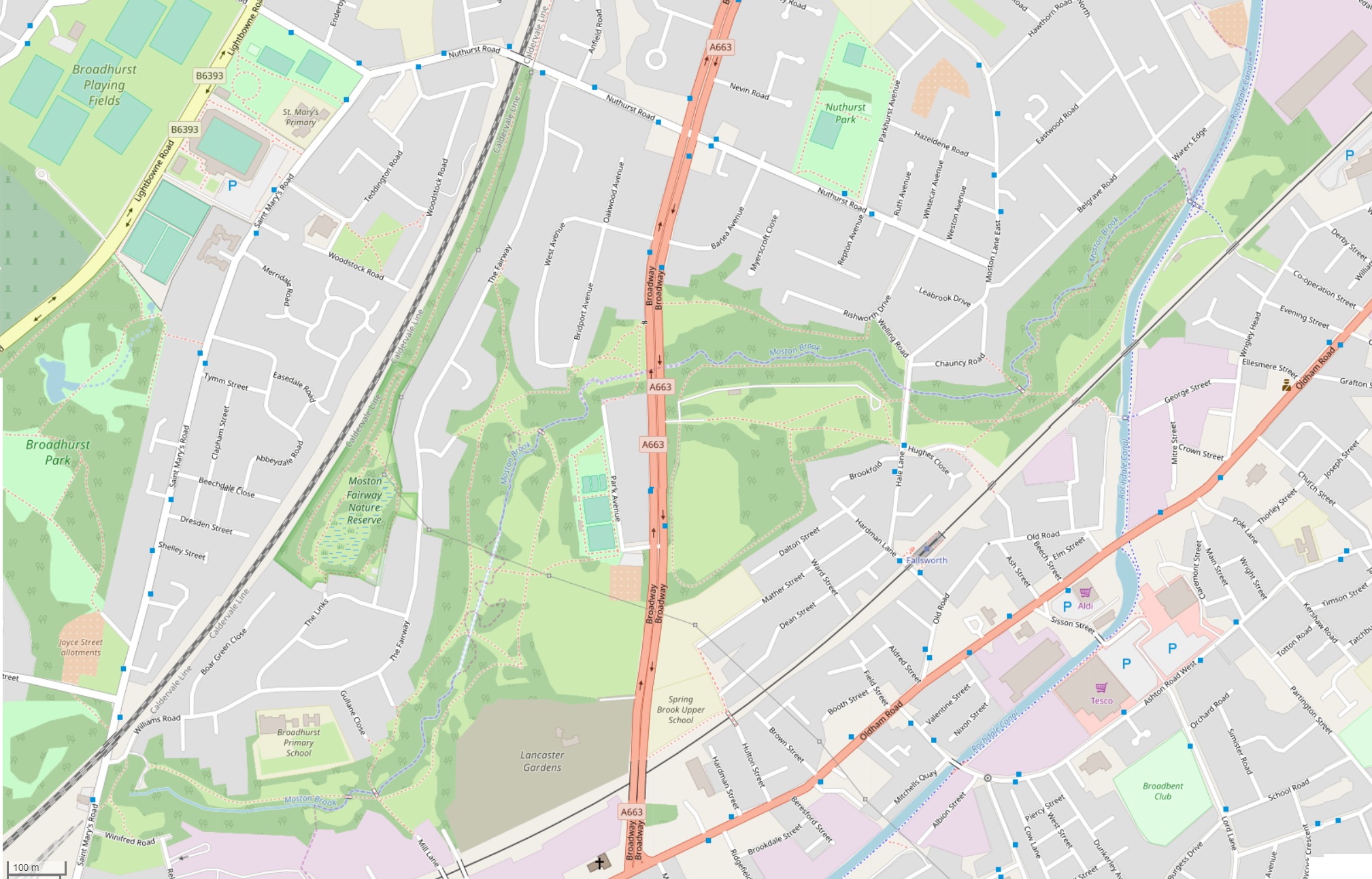
A map showing most of the non-culverted parts of Moston Brook

The brook flows approximately 3.7 miles (6.0 km) from its source (the confluence of Bower Brook and Hole Bottom Brook) to its confluence with the River Irk. It forms part of the River Irwell drainage basin.

The source of Moston Brook is now hidden. Its most upstream part is fully obscured in two culverts, the South Culvert and the North Culvert. The South Culvert is what remains of one of the brook's upstream tributaries, Bower Brook, which flows from the Werneth area and past a pumping station in South Chadderton. Another tributary, Hole Bottom Brook, rises in north Hollinwood and runs to the Failsworth boundary near the Rochdale Canal, where a short section is still in daylight. The North Culvert was connected in the 1990s in order to take run-off from a newly constructed part of the M60 motorway. The confluence of Bower Brook and Hole Bottom Brook is considered the start of Moston Brook proper.

The brook then flows southwest, forming the boundary between the City of Manchester and the Metropolitan Borough of Oldham, both of which are metropolitan boroughs of Greater Manchester. It is partly culverted at Broadway Common due to landfilling activities. The brook flows into Manchester at the southern boundary between Moston and Newton Heath, where it passes into another culvert which takes it underneath Moston Vale. Here it is joined by the Dean Brook, which flows past the site of Moston Hall in Broadhurst Park and is also culverted south of Joyce Street. Up to the early nineteenth century, the section between Failsworth and the Dean Brook was known as Morris Brook. The brook is briefly visible again in Collyhurst near Manchester Communication Academy, before again entering culverts which take it most of the way to its confluence with the River Irk.

The main part of the brook that is currently above ground is broken down into the following areas:

- Wrigley Head – part of the brook near the Rochdale Canal.
- Hardman Fold – once a farm, brickworks and clay-pit, and later a landfill, the area is now meadows, woodland and a waterside walk. Public footpath 79 also runs on the northern (Manchester) side of the valley.
- Broadway – incorporating Lower Failsworth Memorial Land which, after World War I, was purchased by public subscription for the people of Failsworth.
- Moston Fairway – a rare urban nature reserve, run by the Lancashire Wildlife Trust. Part of it was, until 1981, the site of Moston Exchange railway sidings on the Lancashire and Yorkshire Railway Although it does not directly connect with the brook valley, it is close by and is considered part of the same amenity area.

== History ==
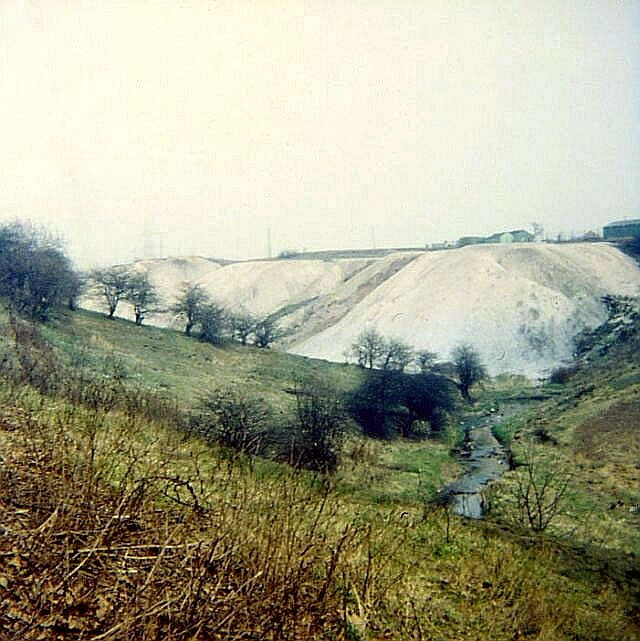
There were once "white hills" beside the brook near Wrigley Head, here shown in 1970.

The area was largely rural but had been engaged in the washing, bleaching and dyeing of yarns since the 16th century, although Moston itself was mostly noted for silk weaving. By 1848, Moston Mill Print Works had already sprung up next to the brook to make use of the running water, joined later by Spring Valley Dye Works in Failsworth. A mill pond, a mill race and a weir were constructed to feed the former, of which only the weir remains. Monsall Hospital was constructed on the banks of the brook in 1871. In 1878, North Road football stadium and cricket ground was built nearby for the use of Newton Heath LYR works team, the team that would later become Manchester United F.C.

There were "white hills" along the banks of the brook, formed from industrial waste. The origin of the hills is unclear, though the hills are shown in photographs dated 1913. Excavation of clay and sand pits alongside the brook fed brickworks on Hale Lane, Failsworth. From around 1949, these pits were used as landfills, the last of which (Hardman Fold) was closed in the 1990s. The brook was gradually culverted along much of its length, in some cases to make room for more landfill sites. For example, the part of the brook that was near Monsall Hospital was culverted to make way for a landfill in the mid-1970s. The hospital itself closed down in 1993 and was demolished soon after. Moston Brook High School, which was built on the former site of the North Road sports pitches, was closed in August 2000.

The remaining visible part of the brook between Failsworth and Moston was reprofiled and landscaped in the 1980s. Valley slopes were smoothed, paths and steps were incorporated, drainage channels were installed and stabilisation work was conducted.

== Environment ==
=== Pollution ===
The proliferation of factories and works in north Manchester, Failsworth and Oldham during and after the Industrial Revolution led to Moston Brook becoming badly polluted. Local children referred to it as the "Black Brook", though the brook changed colour depending on the dyes or pigments being discharged into the brook and its tributaries. At the time, children were known to have drowned in the brook while playing there. Other pollutants over the years included oil gas tar from Hollinwood Gas Works and waste from Failsworth tannery. Both the Rochdale and Hollinwood Canals discharged overflows into the streams, so pollution from the canal water would also find its way into the system.

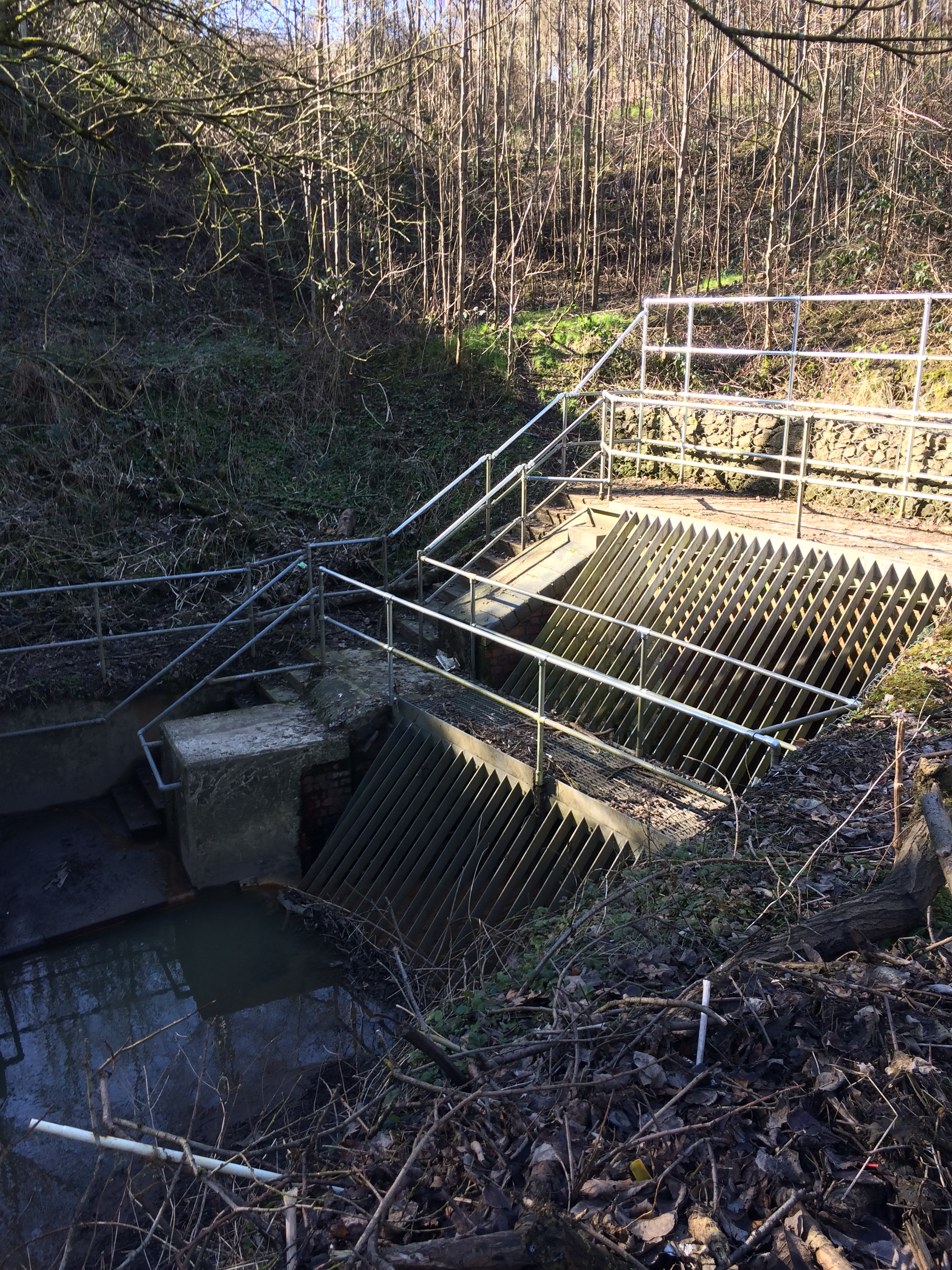
The inflow to one of Moston Brook's culverts

From 1990 to 2007, the brook consistently received the lowest possible grade from the Environment Agency, meaning it was very polluted and had a severely restricted ecosystem. Of all the bodies of water in the Water Framework Directive, it was considered one of the most challenging to improve. It was thus one of the most polluted bodies of water in Greater Manchester, possibly even in the whole North West of England. As part of the Water Framework Directive, it was given the Ecological Quality of Moderate Potential and the possibility of achieving good status by 2027. The brook was failing with regard to levels of ammonia, phosphate and dissolved oxygen.

=== Improvements ===
These poor results led to the Environment Agency and United Utilities agreeing to work together to improve the brook's water quality. This included screening of combined sewer overflows (CSOs). An assessment in 2013 found that the likely causes of pollution in the brook included: intermittent discharge from sewers during storm overflows; leachate from old landfill sites; and continuous sewage discharges from domestic properties due to wrong connections. Other factors investigated were leakage from St Josephs's Cemetery and runoff from the M60 motorway. The study found that fish are absent from the brook.

United Utilities has spent £2 million improving sewerage infrastructure near the brook and the Greater Manchester Waste Disposal Authority (GMWDA) has spent £400,000 on a methane-stripping plant for one of its former landfills. The Environment Agency has funded sustainable drainage systems to prevent surface water entering the brook from a nearby industrial site and former landfill areas. Both Oldham and Manchester Councils recognise the brook's potential as an area of biodiversity. In 2010, Oldham Council hired a member of staff as project officer, in charge of improving the quality of the Moston Brook corridor. Manchester Council has investigated fly tipping incidents.

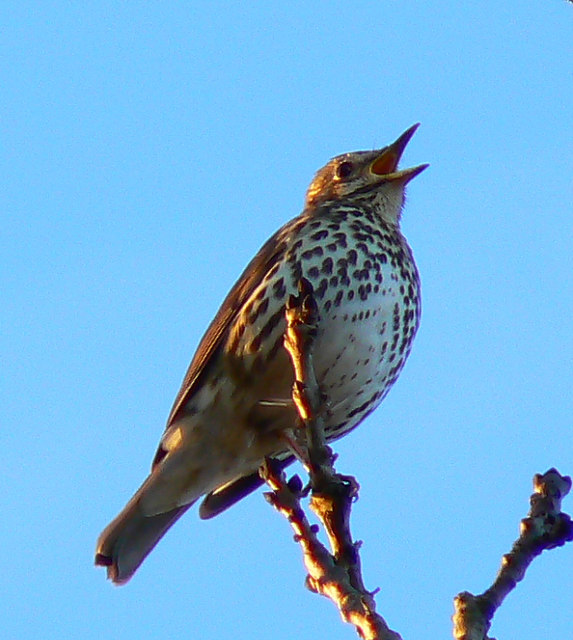
Song thrushes have been found around Moston Brook (illustrative)

There is a local friends group called Moston Brook Friends Group. The group meets to plan access improvements, events, volunteering sessions, guided walks and nature activities.

=== Wildlife ===
A habitat survey of the Moston Brook corridor was conducted by The Greater Manchester Ecology Unit in 2007. Important habitats identified include lowland broad leaved woodland, marshy grassland, reed bed and lowland heath/acid grassland, all of which are priority habitats for conservation listed in the national and Greater Manchester Biodiversity Action Plans. Important species identified included song thrush, house sparrow, starling, snipe and kestrel.

The Moston Brook corridor is bookended by two important sites designated for their nature conservation area. The first of the Rochdale Canal Special Area of Conservation (SAC) and Site of Special Scientific Interest (SSSI) which is a European Designated Site of international conservation importance. The second is the Moston Fairway Nature Reserve (former railway sidings at Moston), a Site of Biological Importance (SBI) which is a designated site of sub-regional nature conservation importance.

== Recreation ==
On the border between Moston and Failsworth, Moston Brook is a recreational resource for residents of both communities. The project officer for the site is tasked with coordinating activities and encouraging the local communities to make use of the corridor. For example, an annual Fun Day is held on Lower Failsworth Memorial Land, with activities such as falconry displays, bouncy castles, arts and crafts and model train rides. Lancashire Wildlife Trust has organised volunteering sessions around Moston Brook and the project officer has conducted bat spotting tours with the local community.

Entrances to the brook have been built along its route by Oldham and Manchester Councils. These allow access to paths and cycleways which can be used for walks, rides and educational activities.

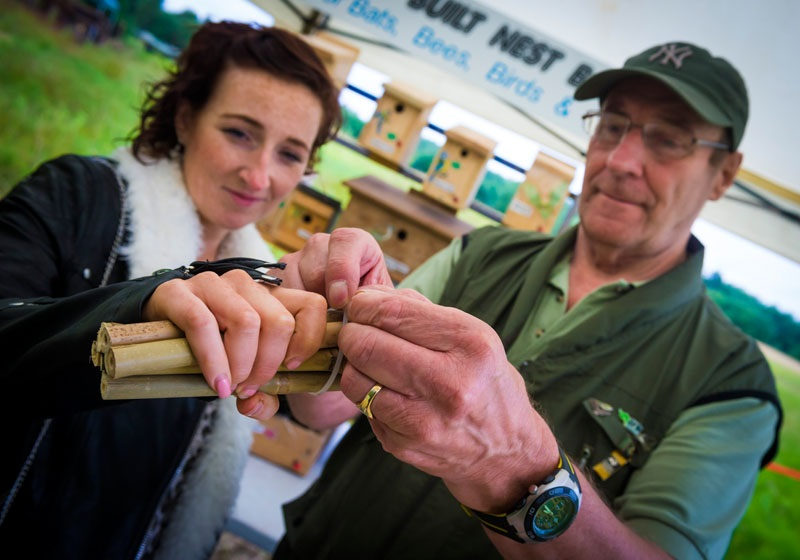
Creating an insect house – Moston Brook Fun Day 2013

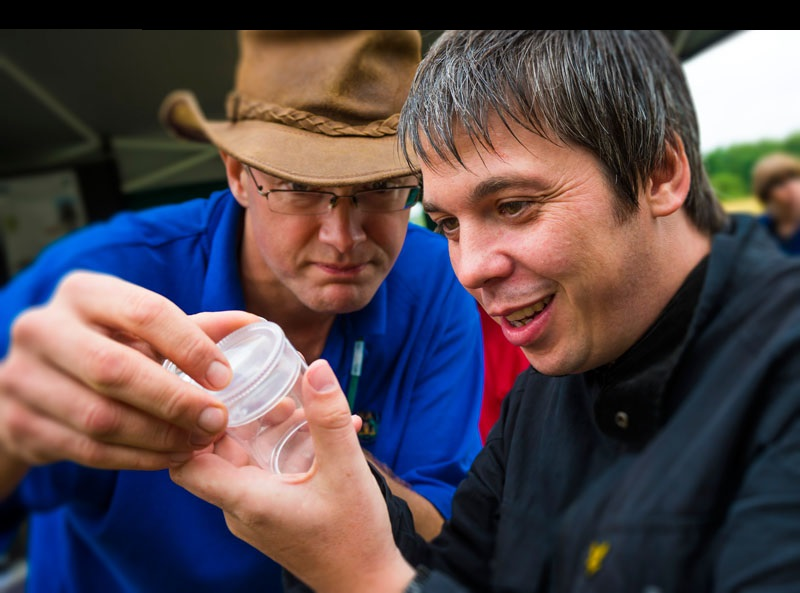
Moston Brook Fun Day 2013

== See also ==
- Boggart Hole Brook
- List of rivers of England
