= 1888–89 Bolton Wanderers F.C. season =

Bolton Wanderers
1888–89 season
- Football League: 5th (28 Points)
- FA Cup: Third Qualifying Round
- Top goalscorer: James Brogan (13)
Home colours

The 1888–89 season was Bolton Wanderers's first season in the Football League which had just been founded. Because of this they became one of the founder members of the Football League. They finished in 5th position with 22 points.

== Final league table ==
Pos	Team	Pld	W	D	L	GF	GA	GAv	Pts
3	Wolverhampton Wanderers	22	12	4	6	51	37	1.378	28
4	Blackburn Rovers	22	10	6	6	66	45	1.467	26
5	Bolton Wanderers	22	10	2	10	63	59	1.068	22
6	West Bromwich Albion	22	10	2	10	40	46	0.870	22
7	Accrington	22	6	8	8	48	48	1.000	20

Source: World Football
Rules for classification: 1) Points; 2) Goal average; 3) Goals scored

== Results ==
Bolton's score comes first

=== Legend ===
Win	Draw	Loss

=== Football League ===
Match	Date	Opponent	Venue	Result	Attendance	Scorers
1	8 September 1888	Derby County	H	3–6	3,000	Davenport (2), Brogan
2	15 September 1888	Burnley	H	3–4	4,000	Davenport, Brogan, Coupar
3	22 September 1888	Preston North End	A	1–3	5,000	Weir
4	29 September 1888	Everton	H	6–2	5,000	Davenport (2), Tyrer (2), Milne (2)
5	6 October 1888	Burnley	A	1–4	4,000	Roberts
6	13 October 1888	Stoke	H	2–1	5,000	Milne, Underwood (o.g.)
7	20 October 1888	Aston Villa	H	2–3	8,000	Weir, Barbour
8	3 November 1888	Everton	A	1–2	8,000	Barbour
9	5 November 1888	West Bromwich Albion	A	5–1	8,000	Barbour (2), Milne, Brogan, Weir
10	10 November 1888	Wolverhampton Wanderers	A	2–3	2,000	Brogan, McGuinness
11	17 November 1888	West Bromwich Albion	H	1–2	3,500	Bullough
12	24 November 1888	Preston North End	H	2–5	3,500	Brogan, Weir
13	8 December 1888	Blackburn Rovers	A	4–4	4,000	Brogan (2), Milne, Scowcroft
14	22 December 1888	Accrington	H	4–1	5,000	Weir (3), Owen
15	26 December 1888	Derby County	A	3–2	3,500	Brogan, Davenport, Milne
16	29 December 1888	Wolverhampton Wanderers	H	2–1	5,500	Weir, Own goal
17	12 January 1889	Aston Villa	A	2–6	2,000	Barbour
18	19 January 1889	Stoke	A	2–2	6,000	Owen, Brogan
19	26 January 1889	Blackburn Rovers	H	3–2	6,000	Owen, Weir
20	5 March 1889	Notts County	A	4–0	3,000	Brogan (2), Barbour, Davenport
21	9 March 1889	Notts County	H	7–3	3,000	Turner, Brogan, Barbour (2), Davenport (3)
22	23 March 1889	Accrington	A	3–2	3,000	Brogan, Roberts, Davenport

=== FA Cup ===
Round	Date	Opponent	Venue	Result	Scorers
1QR	6 October 1888	Hurst	A	0–0	
1QR Replay	Hurst withdrew from replay				
2QR	31 October 1888	West Manchester	H	9–0	Turner (3), Simmers (2), Knowles (2), Whittle, Own goal
3QR	17 November 1888	Linfield Athletic	A	0–4	

== Appearances ==
- Note: Bolton used their reserves in the FA Cup.

Pos.	Name	League		FA Cup		Total	
Pos.	Name	Apps	Goals	Apps	Goals	Apps	Goals
FW	(Scotland) Alexander Barbour	14	9	0	0	14	9
FW	(Scotland) James Brogan	22	13	0	0	22	13
HB	(England) Peter Bullough	15	1	1	0	16	1
FW	(Scotland) Thomas Coupar	3	1	0	0	3	1
FW	(England) Kenny Davenport	22	11	0	0	22	11
FW	(Scotland) Frank Dyer	1	0	0	0	1	0
FB	(England) W. Flitcroft	7	0	0	0	7	0
GK	(Wales) Sam Gillam	2	0	0	0	2	0
GK	(England) Charlie Harrison	19	0	0	0	19	0
FB	(Wales) Di Jones	12	0	0	0	12	0
FW	(England) H. McGuinness	1	1	0	0	1	1
FB	(England) D. Mercer	1	0	0	0	1	0
FW	(England) John Milne	22	6	0	0	22	6
FB	(England) John Mitchell	2	0	0	0	2	0
FW	(England) G. Owen	7	3	0	0	7	3
FB	(England) Jim Parkinson	2	0	0	0	2	0
HB	(Wales) Bob Roberts	22	2	0	0	22	2
FB	(England) Bethel Robinson	18	0	0	0	18	0
HB	(England) J. Scowcroft	9	1	0	0	9	1
FB	(England) E. Siddons	1	0	0	0	1	0
FB	(England) W. Simmers	2	0	2	0	4	0
FW	(England) Jimmy Turner	2	1	3	3	5	4
FW	(England) Harry Tyrer	14	2	0	0	14	2
FW	(England) David Weir	22	10	0	0	22	10

== See also ==
- 1888–89 in English football
- List of Bolton Wanderers F.C. seasons
