= 1892–93 Ardwick A.F.C. season =

English football club season

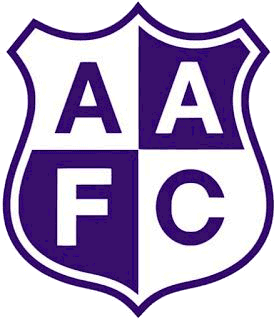
Ardwick A.F.C.
1892–93 season
- Manager: Lawrence Furniss
- Second Division: 5th
- FA Cup: Preliminary round
- Top goalscorer: League: Weir (8 goals); All: Weir (8 goals)
- Highest home attendance: 6,000 vs Small Heath (22 November 1892); 6,000 vs Darwen (17 December 1892)
- Lowest home attendance: 1,000 vs Grimsby (30 December 1892)
Home colours

The 1892–93 season was Ardwick A.F.C.'s second season of league football. Following the amalgamation of the Football Alliance with the Football League, Ardwick was elected to the new Second Division in the inaugural season of two-tier football in England, and the season marked the start of Ardwick (Manchester City)'s exactly 100-year stay in the Football League before leaving in 1992 to co-found the Premier League.

== Football League Second Division ==
Pos	Team	Pld	W	D	L	GF	GA	GAv	Pts	Qualification or relegation
3	Darwen (O, P)	22	14	2	6	60	36	1.667	30	Qualification for test matches
4	Grimsby Town	22	11	1	10	42	41	1.024	23	
5	Ardwick	22	9	3	10	45	40	1.125	21	
6	Burton Swifts	22	9	2	11	47	47	1.000	20	
7	Northwich Victoria	22	9	2	11	42	58	0.724	20	

Rules for classification: 1) Points; 2) Goal average; 3) Goals scored
(O) Play-off winners; (P) Promoted

=== Results summary ===
Overall								Home						Away					
Pld	W	D	L	GF	GA	GD	Pts	W	D	L	GF	GA	GD	W	D	L	GF	GA	GD
22	9	3	10	45	40	+5	20	6	3	2	27	14	+13	3	0	8	18	26	-8

N.B. Points awarded for a win: 2

=== Reports ===
3 September 1892	Ardwick	7–0	Bootle	Ardwick, Manchester
	Russell (penalty missed); Morris; Davies; Angus; Weir	Report		Stadium: Hyde Road; Attendance: 4,000
Note: HT: 5–0

10 September 1892	Northwich Victoria	0–3	Ardwick	Northwich
		Report	Russell; Morris	Stadium: The Drill Field; Attendance: 3,000
Note: HT: 0–0

12 September 1892	Ardwick	2–0	Burslem Port Vale	Ardwick, Manchester
	Weir; Angus	Report		Stadium: Hyde Road; Attendance: 2,000
Note: HT: 1–0

17 September 1892	Walsall Town Swifts	2–4	Ardwick	Walsall
	Marshall; Turner	Report	Angus; Davies; Lambie	Stadium: Chuckery Sports Ground; Attendance: 1,000
Note: HT: 1–3

24 September 1892	Ardwick	1–1	Northwich Victoria	Ardwick, Manchester
	Middleton 87'	Report	Bailey	Stadium: Hyde Road; Attendance: 2,000
Note: HT: 0–1

1 October 1892	Ardwick	2–0	Walsall Town Swifts	Ardwick, Manchester
	Weir; Davies	Report		Stadium: Hyde Road; Attendance: 4,000
Note: HT: 1–0

8 October 1892	Darwen	3–1	Ardwick	Darwen
	Maxwell; McKennie	Report	Davies 1'	Stadium: Barley Bank; Attendance: 6,000
Note: HT: 2–1

10 October 1892	Burslem Port Vale	1–2	Ardwick	Cobridge, Stoke-on-Trent
	Walker	Report	Weir	Stadium: Athletic Ground; Attendance: 1,000
Note: HT: 1–1

22 October 1892	Ardwick	2–2	Small Heath	Ardwick, Manchester
	Morris; Weir	Report	Whelden	Stadium: Hyde Road; Attendance: 3,000
Note: HT: 2–0

5 November 1892	Grimsby Town	2–0	Ardwick	Grimsby
	Mullen; Higgins	Report		Stadium: Abbey Park; Attendance: 2,000
Note: HT: 2–0

26 November 1892	Ardwick	1–1	Burton Swifts	Ardwick, Manchester
	Russell (pen.)	Report	Worrall	Stadium: Hyde Road; Attendance: 1,000
Note: HT: 1–1

17 December 1892	Ardwick	4–2	Darwen	Ardwick, Manchester
	Weir; Mooney; Milarvie	Report	Wade; McKennie	Stadium: Hyde Road; Attendance: 3,000
Note: HT: 3–1

24 December 1892	Lincoln City	2–1	Ardwick	Lincoln
	Smallman; Richardson	Report	Forrester	Stadium: John O'Gaunts; Attendance: 1,000
Note: HT: 1–0

14 January 1893	Burton Swifts	2–0	Ardwick	Burton
	Worrall	Report		Stadium: Peel Croft; Attendance: 1,000
Note: HT: 1–0

21 January 1893	Bootle	5–3	Ardwick	Bootle, Merseyside
	Grierson; Montgomery	Report	Mooney; Middleton	Stadium: Hawthorne Road; Attendance: 800
Note: HT: 3–0

30 January 1893	Ardwick	0–3	Grimsby Town	Ardwick, Manchester
		Report	Riddoch; Fletcher	Stadium: Hyde Road; Attendance: 1,000
Note: HT: 0–1

4 February 1893	Crewe Alexandra	4–1	Ardwick	Crewe
	Williams 6'; McDuff; Barnett	Report	Yates	Stadium: Alexandra Recreation Ground; Attendance: 1,000
Note: HT: 3–1

18 February 1893	Ardwick	3–1	Crewe Alexandra	Ardwick, Manchester
	Bowman; Yates; Milarvie	Report	Roberts	Stadium: Hyde Road; Attendance: 1,000
Note: HT: 1–0

4 March 1893	Ardwick	2–3	Sheffield United	Ardwick, Manchester
	Bowman; Whittle	Report	Gallacher; Drummond; Cain	Stadium: Hyde Road; Attendance: 3,000
Note: HT: 2–1

25 March 1893	Sheffield United	2–1	Ardwick	Sheffield
	Needham	Report	Yates	Stadium: Bramall Lane; Attendance: 2,000
Note: HT: 0–0

1 April 1893	Small Heath	3–2	Ardwick	Small Heath, Birmingham
	Walton; Hallam	Report	Yates; Carson	Stadium: Muntz Street; Attendance: 2,000
Note: HT: 1–1

17 April 1893	Ardwick	3–1	Lincoln City	Ardwick, Manchester
	Mooney; Morris; Yates	Report	Moore	Stadium: Hyde Road; Attendance: 2,000
Note: HT: 2–1

== Cup competitions ==
=== FA Cup ===
The draw for the preliminary round and first round of the FA Cup was held at a meeting of the Football Association on 29 August 1892. Ardwick were drawn away at Fleetwood Rangers in the preliminary round, although Ardwick made an offer to Fleetwood to transfer the game to their own stadium, which was accepted. A first round home tie against Workington awaited the winners. The first match was drawn and Fleetwood refused to play extra time, forcing a replay, which was also held at Hyde Road.

22 September 1892 Qualifying Round	Ardwick	1–1	Fleetwood Rangers	Ardwick, Manchester
	Milarvie	HT: 1–1	H. Wilson	Stadium: Hyde Road; Attendance: 600

5 October 1892 Qualifying Round replay	Ardwick	0–2	Fleetwood Rangers	Ardwick, Manchester
		HT: 0–0	Unknown; Brogan	Stadium: Hyde Road; Attendance: 2,000

=== Lancashire Senior Cup ===
28 January 1893 First Round	Ardwick	3–2	Rossendale United	Ardwick, Manchester
	Russell; Milarvie		Goal	Stadium: Hyde Road; Attendance: 3,000

11 March 1893 Second Round	Ardwick	3–1	Blackpool	Ardwick, Manchester
	Milarvie; Morris; Mooney		Goal	Stadium: Hyde Road; Attendance: 6,000

8 April 1893 Semi-final	Bolton Wanderers	5–1	Ardwick	Bolton
	Weir ? ?		Mooney	Stadium: Pike's Lane; Attendance: 4,000

=== Manchester Senior Cup ===
25 February 1893 First Round	Bury	3–0	Ardwick	Gigg Lane, Bury
	Goal			Stadium: Hyde Road; Attendance: 6,000

== Friendlies ==
1 September 1892	Ardwick	2–2	Nottingham Forest	Ardwick, Manchester
	Angus (?), (?)		? (?) ? (?)	Stadium: Hyde Road

28 September 1892	Middlesbrough Ironopolis	3–2	Ardwick	Middlesbrough
	? (?) ? (?) ? (?)		Angus (?), (?)	Stadium: Paradise Ground; Attendance: 1,000

18 October 1892	Ardwick	2–3	West Manchester	Ardwick, Manchester
	? (?) ? (?)		? (?) ? (?) ? (?)	Stadium: Hyde Road; Attendance: 3,000

29 October 1892	Ardwick	6–3	Middlesbrough	Ardwick, Manchester
	Weir (?), (?), (?); Morris (?), (?); Russell (?)		? (?) ? (?) ? (?)	Stadium: Hyde Road; Attendance: 2,500

12 November 1892	Ardwick	3–0	Bolton Wanderers	Ardwick, Manchester
	Milarvie (?); Morris (?); Davies (?)			Stadium: Hyde Road; Attendance: 5,000

19 November 1892	Middlesbrough	6–3	Ardwick	Middlesbrough
	? (?) ? (?) ? (?) ? (?) ? (?) ? (?)		Weir (?); Middleton (?); Mooney (?)	Stadium: Middlesbrough Cricket Club; Attendance: 2,000

3 December 1892	Ardwick	3–3	Notts County	Ardwick, Manchester
	Forrester (?), (?); Hopkins (?)		? (?) ? (?) ? (?)	Stadium: Hyde Road; Attendance: 2,000

10 December 1892	Ardwick	2–6	Stoke	Ardwick, Manchester
	Weir (?); Davies (?)		? (?) ? (?) ? (?) ? (?) ? (?) ? (?)	Stadium: Hyde Road; Attendance: 2,000

26 December 1892	Ardwick	0–5	(Scotland) Celtic	Ardwick, Manchester
			? (?) ? (?) ? (?) ? (?) ? (?)	Stadium: Hyde Road; Attendance: 8,500

31 December 1892	Ardwick	0–1	(Scotland) Thistle	Ardwick, Manchester
			? (?)	Stadium: Hyde Road

2 January 1893 Manchester derby	Ardwick	3–5	Newton Heath	Ardwick, Manchester
	Weir (?), (?); Morris (?)		? (?) ? (?) ? (?) ? (?) ? (?)	Stadium: Hyde Road; Attendance: 10,000

7 January 1893	Ardwick	5–1	Blackpool South Shore	Ardwick, Manchester
	Milne (?), (?); Milarvie (?); Morris (?); Davies (?)		? (?)	Stadium: Hyde Road; Attendance: 1,000

11 January 1893	Ardwick	0–5	Internationals XI	Ardwick, Manchester
			(?) ? (?) ? (?) ? (?) ? (?)	Stadium: Hyde Road; Attendance: 2,000

11 February 1893	Ardwick	1–3	Middlesbrough Ironopolis	Ardwick, Manchester
	Yates (?)		(?) ? (?) ? (?)	Stadium: Hyde Road; Attendance: 2,000

14 February 1893	Ardwick	2–7	Blackpool	Ardwick, Manchester
	? (?) ? (?)		? (?) ? (?) ? (?) ? (?) ? (?) ? (?) ? (?)	Stadium: Hyde Road

18 March 1893	Fairfield	1–2	Ardwick	Droylsden, Greater Manchester
	? (?)		Mooney (?) ? (?)	Stadium: Gransmoor Road; Attendance: 2,000

20 March 1893	Ardwick	2–2	Rotherham Town	Ardwick, Manchester
	Mooney (?); Milarvie (?)		? (?) ? (?)	Stadium: Hyde Road; Attendance: 1,000

27 March 1893 Manchester derby	Newton Heath	3–2	Ardwick	Newton Heath, Manchester
	? (?) ? (?) ? (?)		? (?) ? (?)	Stadium: North Road; Attendance: 2,000

31 March 1893	West Manchester	2–0	Ardwick	Whalley Range, Manchester
	? (?) ? (?)			Stadium: Brooks' Bar; Attendance: 5,000

3 April 1893	Blackpool	6–1	Ardwick	Blackpool
	? (?) ? (?) ? (?) ? (?) ? (?) ? (?)		? (?)	Stadium: Raikes Hall

10 April 1893 Manchester derby	Newton Heath	2–1	Ardwick	Newton Heath, Manchester
	? (?) ? (?)		Mooney (?)	Stadium: North Road; Attendance: 3,000

20 April 1893	Ardwick	1–1	Gorton Villa	Ardwick, Manchester
	? (?)		? (?)	Stadium: Hyde Road

22 April 1893	Ardwick	1–0	Northwich Victoria	Ardwick, Manchester
	Morris (?)			Stadium: Hyde Road; Attendance: 3,000

24 April 1893	Rotherham Town	1–0	Ardwick	Rotherham
	? (?)			Stadium: Clifton Grove

29 April 1893 Manchester derby	Ardwick	3–0	Newton Heath	Ardwick, Manchester
	Morris (?); Hopkins (?) ? (?)			Stadium: Hyde Road; Attendance: "Very moderate"

== Squad statistics ==
=== Appearances and goals ===
No.	Pos	Nat	Player	Total		Division 1		FA Cup	
No.	Pos	Nat	Player	Apps	Goals	Apps	Goals	Apps	Goals
	MF	(Scotland) SCO	Hugh/Harry Angus	2	0	2	0	0	0
	FW	(Scotland) SCO	Jack Angus	8	3	7	3	1	0
	MF	(England) ENG	Charles/George Armitt	1	0	1	0	0	0
	DF	(Canada) CAN	Walter Bowman	4	2	2	2	2	0
	FW	(Scotland) SCO	Adam Carson	3	1	3	1	0	0
	FW	(Wales) WAL	Joe Davies	14	7	12	7	2	0
	GK	(Scotland) SCO	William Douglas	22	0	20	0	2	0
	FW	(England) ENG	Tom Forrester	4	1	4	1	0	0
	MF	(England) ENG	William Hopkins	21	0	20	0	1	0
	FW	(Scotland) SCO	William Lambie	3	1	3	1	0	0
	DF	(Ireland) EIR	John McVicker	19	0	17	0	2	0
	MF	(England) ENG	Harry Middleton	23	2	21	2	2	0
	FW	(Scotland) SCO	Bob Milarvie	19	3	17	2	2	1
	FW	(England) ENG	John Milne	9	0	8	0	1	0
	FW	(England) ENG	Felix Mooney	9	4	9	4	0	0
	FW	(Wales) WAL	Hugh Morris	21	5	19	5	2	0
	DF	(Scotland) SCO	David Robson	24	0	22	0	2	0
	DF	(Scotland) SCO	Davie Russell	19	3	17	3	2	0
	DF		Fred Steele	4	0	4	0	0	0
	GK	(England) ENG	Herbert/Harry Stones	2	0	2	0	0	0
	FW	(England) ENG	Wilmot Turner	1	0	1	0	0	0
	FW	(England) ENG	Davie Weir	15	8	14	8	1	0
	DF	(England) ENG	Danny Whittle	9	1	9	1	0	0
	MF	(England) ENG	Jimmy Yates	8	5	8	5	0	0

=== Goals record ===
Rank	No.	Nat.	Po.	Name	League	FA Cup	Total
1		(England)	FW	David Weir	8	0	8
2		(Wales)	FW	Joe Davies	7	0	7
3		(Wales)	FW	Hugh Morris	5	0	5
3		(England)	MF	Jimmy Yates	5	0	5
5		(England)	FW	Felix Mooney	4	0	4
6		(Scotland)	FW	Jack Angus	3	0	3
6		(Scotland)	FW	Bob Milarvie	2	1	3
6		(Scotland)	DF	Davie Russell	3	0	3
9		(Canada)	DF	Walter Bowman	2	0	2
9		(England)	MF	Harry Middleton	2	0	2
11		(Scotland)	FW	Adam Carson	1	0	1
11		(England)	FW	Tom Forrester	1	0	1
11		(Scotland)	FW	William Lambie	1	0	1
11		(England)	DF	Danny Whittle	1	0	1
Total					45	1	46

== Transfers ==
=== Transfers in ===
First team
Date	Pos.	Player	From club
Pre-season	Full back	(Scotland) Archibald Ferguson	(Scotland) Heart of Midlothian
Pre-season	Forward	(Scotland) Bob Milarvie	(England) Newton Heath
Pre-season	Forward	(Scotland) J. Campbell	(Scotland) Celtic
Pre-season	Forward	(Scotland) D. Lafferty	(Scotland) Celtic
Pre-season	Forward	J. McCarthy	Unknown
Unknown	Full-back	Cooke	Unknown
Unknown	Full-back	John McVickers	Unknown
Unknown	Half-back	Baker	Unknown
Unknown	Half-back	William Hopkins	Unknown
Unknown	Half-back	S. Jackson	Unknown
Unknown	Half-back	Harry Middleton	Unknown
Unknown	Half-back	Charles Parry	Unknown
Unknown	Forward	(Scotland) Jack Angus	(Scotland) Third Lanark
Unknown	Forward	Alex Boggie	Unknown
Unknown	Forward	Powery	Unknown
Unknown	Forward	William Sharpe	Unknown

== See also ==
- Manchester City F.C. seasons
