= 1893–94 Ardwick A.F.C. season =

English football club season

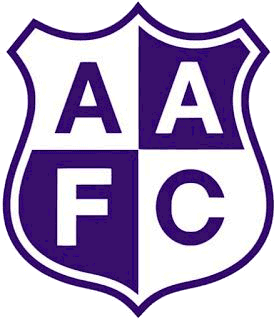
Ardwick A.F.C. / Manchester City F.C.
1893–94 season
- Manager: Joshua Parlby
- Second Division: 13th
- FA Cup: First qualifying round
- Top goalscorer: League: Morris (7 goals); All: Morris (7 goals)
- Highest home attendance: 6,000 vs Liverpool (16 Sept 1893)
- Lowest home attendance: 1,000 vs Burton (11 Sept 1893)

The 1893–94 season was Ardwick A.F.C.'s third season of league football and second season in the Football League. In the latter half of the season, financial difficulties forced the reorganisation of the club into the team Manchester City F.C. on the day of their last league game of the season. By this name the club have been known for the rest of their history.

The season saw the unusual event of Ardwick being forced to play one game – away versus Crewe Alexandra – with only ten players. In a season in which Ardwick lost two thirds of their games and recorded one of their worst ever league results, they drew the match 1–1.

== Team kit ==
Pre-consolidation as
Manchester City F.C.
Post-consolidation as Manchester City F.C.

== Football League Second Division ==
Pos	Team	Pld	W	D	L	GF	GA	GAv	Pts	Qualification or relegation
11	Middlesbrough Ironopolis (Note: Middlesbrough Ironopolis was liquidated at the end of the season.)	28	8	4	16	37	72	0.514	20	Dissolved
12	Crewe Alexandra	28	6	7	15	42	73	0.575	19	
13	Ardwick	28	8	2	18	47	71	0.662	18	Re-elected
14	Rotherham Town	28	6	3	19	44	91	0.484	15	Re-elected
15	Northwich Victoria (R)	28	3	3	22	30	98	0.306	9	Resigned from league

Rules for classification: 1) Points; 2) Goal average; 3) Goals scored
(R) Relegated

=== Results summary ===
Overall								Home						Away					
Pld	W	D	L	GF	GA	GD	Pts	W	D	L	GF	GA	GD	W	D	L	GF	GA	GD
28	8	2	18	47	71	-24	18	6	1	7	32	20	+12	2	1	11	15	51	-36

N.B. Points awarded for a win: 2

=== Reports ===
2 September 1893	Burslem Port Vale	4–2	Ardwick	Cobridge, Stoke-on-Trent
	Sands; Beats; Scarratt	Report	Carson; Robinson	Stadium: Athletic Ground; Attendance: 2,500
Note: HT: 3–1

9 September 1893	Ardwick	6–1	Middlesbrough Ironopolis	Ardwick, Manchester
	Morris, Bowman; Carson; Robinson; Jones	Report	Hunter	Stadium: Hyde Road; Attendance: 4,000
Note: HT: 4–1

11 September 1893	Ardwick	1–4	Burton Swifts	Ardwick, Manchester
	Morris	Report	Ekins; Boggie	Stadium: Hyde Road; Attendance: 1,000
Note: HT: 1–0

16 September 1893	Ardwick	0–1	Liverpool	Ardwick, Manchester
		Report	Stott 80'	Stadium: Hyde Road; Attendance: 6,000
Note: HT: 0–0

20 September 1893	Burton Swifts	5–0	Ardwick	Burton
	Boggie 7', 65'; Ekins ?', ?'; Dewey ?'	Report		Stadium: Peel Croft; Attendance: 3,000
Note: HT: 3–0

23 September 1893	Middlesbrough Ironopolis	2–0	Ardwick	Middlesbrough
	Allport; Adams	Report		Stadium: Paradise Ground; Attendance: 800
Note: HT: 1–0

30 September 1893	Ardwick	0–1	Small Heath	Ardwick, Manchester
		Report	Wheldon	Stadium: Hyde Road; Attendance: 5,000
Note: HT: 0–0

7 October 1893	Ardwick	8–1	Burslem Port Vale	Ardwick, Manchester
	Morris; Yates; Steele; Milarvie; Middleton; Youds (o.g.)	Report	Wood	Stadium: Hyde Road; Attendance: 4,000
Note: HT: 1–0

21 October 1893	Ardwick	2–3	Newcastle United	Ardwick, Manchester
	Morris; Yates	Report	Crate; Wallace; Unknown	Stadium: Hyde Road; Attendance: 3,000
Note: HT: 2–0

28 October 1893	Ardwick	0–0	Notts County	Ardwick, Manchester
		Report		Stadium: Hyde Road; Attendance: 4,000
Note: HT: 0–0

11 November 1893	Woolwich Arsenal	1–0	Ardwick	Plumstead, London
	Henderson	Report		Stadium: Manor Ground; Attendance: 4,000
Note: HT: 1–0

18 November 1893	Ardwick	3–0	Walsall Town Swifts	Ardwick, Manchester
	Robertson ?'; Yates ?', 90' (pen.)	Report		Stadium: Hyde Road; Attendance: 3,000
Note: HT: 2–0

2 December 1893	Liverpool	3–0	Ardwick	Liverpool
	Stott 35'; McQueen 75'; Henderson 85'	Report		Stadium: Anfield; Attendance: 4,000
Note: HT: 1–0

9 December 1893	Ardwick	4–1	Grimsby Town	Ardwick, Manchester
	Middleton; Whittle; Davies; Bennett	Report	McCairns	Stadium: Hyde Road; Attendance: 4,000
Note: HT: 1–0

26 December 1893	Ardwick	3–2	Rotherham Town	Ardwick, Manchester
	Pickford ?', ?'; Bennett ?'	Report	Sylvester 1'; Fairburn ?'	Stadium: Hyde Road; Attendance: 4,000
Note: HT: 2–1

30 December 1893	Ardwick	0–1	Woolwich Arsenal	Ardwick, Manchester
		Report	Henderson	Stadium: Hyde Road; Attendance: 4,000
Note: HT: 0–0

6 January 1894	Newcastle United	2–1	Ardwick	Newcastle
	Thompson; Graham	Report	Pickford	Stadium: St James' Park; Attendance: 800; Referee: WH Stacey
Note: HT: 1–1

13 January 1894	Grimsby Town	5–0	Ardwick	Grimsby
	McCairns; Robinson; Fletcher	Report	Pickford	Stadium: Abbey Park; Attendance: 1,000; Referee: H Shelton
Note: HT: 3–0

27 January 1894	Ardwick	4–2	Northwich Victoria	Ardwick, Manchester
	Bennett; Whittle; Dyer	Report	Drinkwater; Guest	Stadium: Hyde Road; Attendance: 3,000; Referee: R Kirkham
Note: HT: 1–2

10 February 1894	Northwich Victoria	1–4	Ardwick	Northwich
	Bailey	Report	Milarvie ?', 65'; Robertson; Milne	Stadium: The Drill Field; Attendance: 2,000
Note: HT: 0–3

24 February 1894	Crewe Alexandra	1–1	Ardwick	Crewe
	Jones 50'	Report	Bennett	Stadium: Alexandra Recreation Ground; Attendance: 1,000
Note: HT: 0–1

15 March 1894	Notts County	5–0	Ardwick	Nottingham
	Logan 1', ?'; Allsopp ?'; Bruce ?'; Kerr 45'	Report		Stadium: Trent Bridge; Attendance: 2,500
Note: HT: 5–0

17 March 1894	Small Heath	10–2	Ardwick	Birmingham
	Mobley; Hallam; Jenkyns; Walton; Wheldon; Hands	Report	Bennett; Robertson	Stadium: Muntz Street; Attendance: 2,000
Note: HT: 4–0

24 March 1894	Lincoln City	6–0	Ardwick	Lincoln
	Irving; Chadburn; Flewitt; Raby; Graham	Report		Stadium: John O'Gaunts; Attendance: 1,000
Note: HT: 4–0

26 March 1894	Rotherham Town	1–3	Ardwick	Rotherham
	Broadhead	Report	Milne; Milarvie; Baker	Stadium: Clifton Lane; Attendance: 2,000
Note: HT: 0–2

31 March 1894	Ardwick	0–1	Lincoln City	Ardwick, Manchester
		Report	Chadburn 45'	Stadium: Hyde Road; Attendance: 3,000
Note: HT: 0–1

7 April 1894	Ardwick	1–2	Crewe Alexandra	Ardwick, Manchester
	Spittle	Report	Woolfe; Sandham	Stadium: Hyde Road; Attendance: 2,500
Note: HT: 0–1

14 April 1894	Walsall Town Swifts	5–2	Ardwick	Walsall
	McWhinnie; Leatherbarrow; Copeland	Report	Milne 45'; Forrester 45'	Stadium: West Bromwich Road; Attendance: 2,000
Note: HT: 4–2

== Cup competitions ==
=== FA Cup ===
14 October 1893 Qualifying Round	West Manchester	3–0	Ardwick	Whalley Range, Manchester
	Walsh; Waring	HT: 2–0		Stadium: Brooks' Bar; Attendance: 6,000

=== Lancashire Senior Cup ===
20 January 1894 First Round	Ardwick	2–4	Rossendale	Ardwick, Manchester
	Pickford; Bennett		Goal	Stadium: Hyde Road; Attendance: 1,000

=== Manchester Senior Cup ===
3 February 1894 First Round	Ardwick	3–6	Bury	Ardwick, Manchester
	Hargreaves; Pickford		Goal	Stadium: Hyde Road; Attendance: 6,000

== Friendlies ==
4 September 1893	Ardwick	0–5	Bolton Wanderers	Ardwick, Manchester
			Goal	Stadium: Hyde Road; Attendance: 2,000

12 September 1893	Darwen	7–0	Ardwick	Darwen
	Goal			Stadium: Barley Bank; Attendance: 1,000

18 September 1893	Stoke	4–0	Ardwick	Stoke
	Goal			Stadium: Victoria Ground; Attendance: 1,000

25 September 1893	Ardwick	2–5	Darwen	Ardwick, Manchester
	Yates; O'Brien		Goal	Stadium: Hyde Road; Attendance: 1,000

16 October 1893	Ardwick	2–3	Everton	Ardwick, Manchester
	Yates; Morris		Goal	Stadium: Hyde Road; Attendance: 2,000

4 November 1893	Ardwick	1–1	Fairfield	Ardwick, Manchester
	Yates		Goal	Stadium: Hyde Road

6 November 1893	Ardwick	6–3	Stoke	Ardwick, Manchester
	Milarvie; Steele, Davies		Goal	Stadium: Hyde Road; Attendance: 1,000

25 November 1893 Abandoned	Ardwick	1–2	Derby County	Ardwick, Manchester
	Whittle		Goal	Stadium: Hyde Road
Note: Abandoned after 65 minutes due to downpour.

23 December 1893	Ardwick	2–6	Liverpool	Ardwick, Manchester
	Bennett; Whittle		McBride; McVean; Stott	Stadium: Hyde Road; Attendance: 3,000

25 December 1893	Newton Heath	2–1	Ardwick	Clayton, Greater Manchester
	Goal		Bennett	Stadium: Bank Street; Attendance: 6,000

1 January 1894	Ardwick	1–2	Wolverhampton Wanderers	Ardwick, Manchester
	Pickford		Goal	Stadium: Hyde Road; Attendance: 1,000

2 January 1894	Ardwick	1–0	West Manchester	Ardwick, Manchester
	Goal			Stadium: Hyde Road; Attendance: 1,500

17 February 1894	Ardwick	3–0	Stockport County	Ardwick, Manchester
	Milne; Robertson; Bennett			Stadium: Hyde Road; Attendance: 1,000

23 March 1894	Ardwick	2–2	West Manchester	Ardwick, Manchester
	Milne		Goal	Stadium: Hyde Road; Attendance: 3,000

9 April 1894	Ardwick	1–2	Newton Heath	Ardwick, Manchester
	Bowman		Goal	Stadium: Hyde Road; Attendance: 1,000

18 April 1894	Ardwick	0–2	Sheffield United	Ardwick, Manchester
			Morris	Stadium: Hyde Road; Attendance: 1,000

28 April 1894	Stockport County	0–0	Ardwick	Stockport
				Stadium: Green Lane

== Squad statistics ==
=== Appearances and goals ===
No.	Pos	Nat	Player	Total		Division 1		FA Cup	
No.	Pos	Nat	Player	Apps	Goals	Apps	Goals	Apps	Goals
	MF		James Baker	3	1	3	1	0	0
	FW		Arnold Bennett	12	6	12	6	0	0
	DF	(Canada) CAN	Walter Bowman	21	1	21	1	0	0
	DF		James Cairns	1	0	1	0	0	0
	FW	(Scotland) SCO	Adam Carson	6	2	6	2	0	0
	FW	(Wales) WAL	Joe Davies	4	1	4	1	0	0
	GK	(Scotland) SCO	William Douglas	17	0	16	0	1	0
	MF	(Scotland) SCO	Frank Dyer	21	1	20	1	1	0
	FW	(England) ENG	Alf Edge	1	0	1	0	0	0
	FW	(Wales) WAL	William Egan	7	0	7	0	0	0
	FW	(England) ENG	Tom Forrester	6	1	6	1	0	0
	MF		James/Joshua Hargreaves	8	0	8	0	0	0
	MF	(England) ENG	William Hopkins	3	0	3	0	0	0
	MF		John Hughes	2	0	2	0	0	0
	FW	(Wales) WAL	Arnold Jones	2	1	2	1	0	0
	DF		Arthur McDowell	4	0	4	0	0	0
	DF	(Ireland) EIR	John McVicker	10	0	9	0	1	0
	MF	(England) ENG	Harry Middleton	17	2	16	2	1	0
	FW	(Scotland) SCO	Bob Milarvie	22	4	21	4	1	0
	FW	(England) ENG	John Milne	10	3	10	3	0	0
	FW	(Wales) WAL	Hugh Morris	10	7	9	7	1	0
	MF		Joe O'Brien	2	0	2	0	0	0
	MF	(England) ENG	Ernie Pickford	8	3	8	3	0	0
	MF		Eric Regan	22	0	21	0	1	0
	FW		Douglas Robertson	7	3	7	3	0	0
	FW		Robert Robinson	4	2	4	2	0	0
	DF	(Scotland) SCO	David Robson	18	0	17	0	1	0
	MF	(England) ENG	William Saddington	7	0	7	0	0	0
	FW	(England) ENG	Arthur Spittle	1	1	1	1	0	0
	DF		Fred Steele	14	1	13	1	1	0
	DF		James Stenson	2	0	2	0	0	0
	GK	(England) ENG	Herbert/Harry Stones	10	0	10	0	0	0
	DF	(England) ENG	Danny Whittle	22	2	21	2	1	0
	FW		William Willey	1	0	1	0	0	0
	MF	(England) ENG	Jimmy Yates	13	4	12	4	1	0

=== Goals record ===
Rank	No.	Nat.	Po.	Name	League	FA Cup	Total
1		(Wales)	FW	Hugh Morris	7	0	7
2			FW	Arnold Bennett	6	0	6
3		(Scotland)	FW	Bob Milarvie	4	0	4
3		(England)	MF	Jimmy Yates	4	0	4
5		(England)	FW	John Milne	3	0	3
5		(England)	MF	Ernie Pickford	3	0	3
5			FW	Douglas Robertson	3	0	3
8		(England)	DF	Danny Whittle	2	0	2
8		(England)	MF	Harry Middleton	2	0	2
8		(Scotland)	FW	Adam Carson	2	0	2
8			FW	Robert Robinson	2	0	2
12		(Canada)	DF	Walter Bowman	1	0	1
12		(Scotland)	MF	Frank Dyer	1	0	1
12			DF	Fred Steele	1	0	1
12		(England)	FW	Tom Forrester	1	0	1
12		(Wales)	FW	Joe Davies	1	0	1
12			MF	James Baker	1	0	1
12		(Wales)	FW	Arnold Jones	1	0	1
12		(England)	FW	Arthur Spittle	1	0	1
Total					46	0	46

== Transfers ==
=== Transfers in ===
First team
Date	Pos.	Player	From club
May 1893	Left half	E. J. Regan	Unknown
Pre-season	Outside left	H. Saddington	Unknown
Pre-season	Inside left	Robert Robinson	Fleetwood Rangers
July 1893	Inside right	A. Jones	(England) Small Heath
28 July 1893	Right back	A. McDowell	Unknown
15 August 1893	Left back/left half	Frank Dyer	(England) Woolwich Arsenal
13 September 1893	Outside right	E. Pickford	Unknown
15 September 1893	Joseph O'Brien	Frank Dyer	Unknown
21 September 1893	Right back	James Stenson	Unknown
27 September 1893	Inside right	Arthur Spittle	Unknown
6 October 1893	Inside right	A. Bennett	Unknown
18 October 1893	Centre forward	D. Robertson	Unknown
15 November 1893	Centre forward/inside right	William Egan	(England) Fairfield
22 December 1893	Centre forward	William Willey	Unknown
15 January 1894	Inside/outside left	Alfred Edge	(England) Northwich Victoria
20 March 1894	Outside left	John Hughes	Unknown

=== Transfers out ===
First team
Exit Date	Pos.	Player	To club
1 December 1893	Winger	(England) Jimmy Yates	(England) Sheffield United
8 December 1893	Forward	(Wales) Hugh Morris	(England) Sheffield United
8 January 1894	Left back	(Scotland) David Robson	(England) Wolverhampton Wanderers
Late January 1894		(Wales) Joseph Davies	(England) Sheffield United
Late January 1894	Goalkeeper	(Scotland) William Douglas	(England) Newton Heath
February 1894	Half back	Harry Middleton	(England) Loughborough
28 February 1894	Centre forward	(Scotland) Adam Carson	(England) Liverpool
29 April 1894		Daniel Whittle	(England) Bolton Wanderers
29 April 1894		William Hopkins	(England) Burslem Port Vale
29 April 1894		John McVickers	(England) Macclesfield
29 April 1894		Eric Regan	(England) Liverpool
29 April 1894	Full back/wing half	James Cairns	(England) Liverpool
29 April 1894		Felix Mooney	(England) Bury
29 April 1894		J. Hargreaves	(England) Blackburn Rovers
29 April 1894	Goalkeeper	Harry Stones	(England) Newton Heath

== See also ==
- Manchester City F.C. seasons
