= 1892–93 Newton Heath F.C. season =

English football club season

Newton Heath
1892–93 season
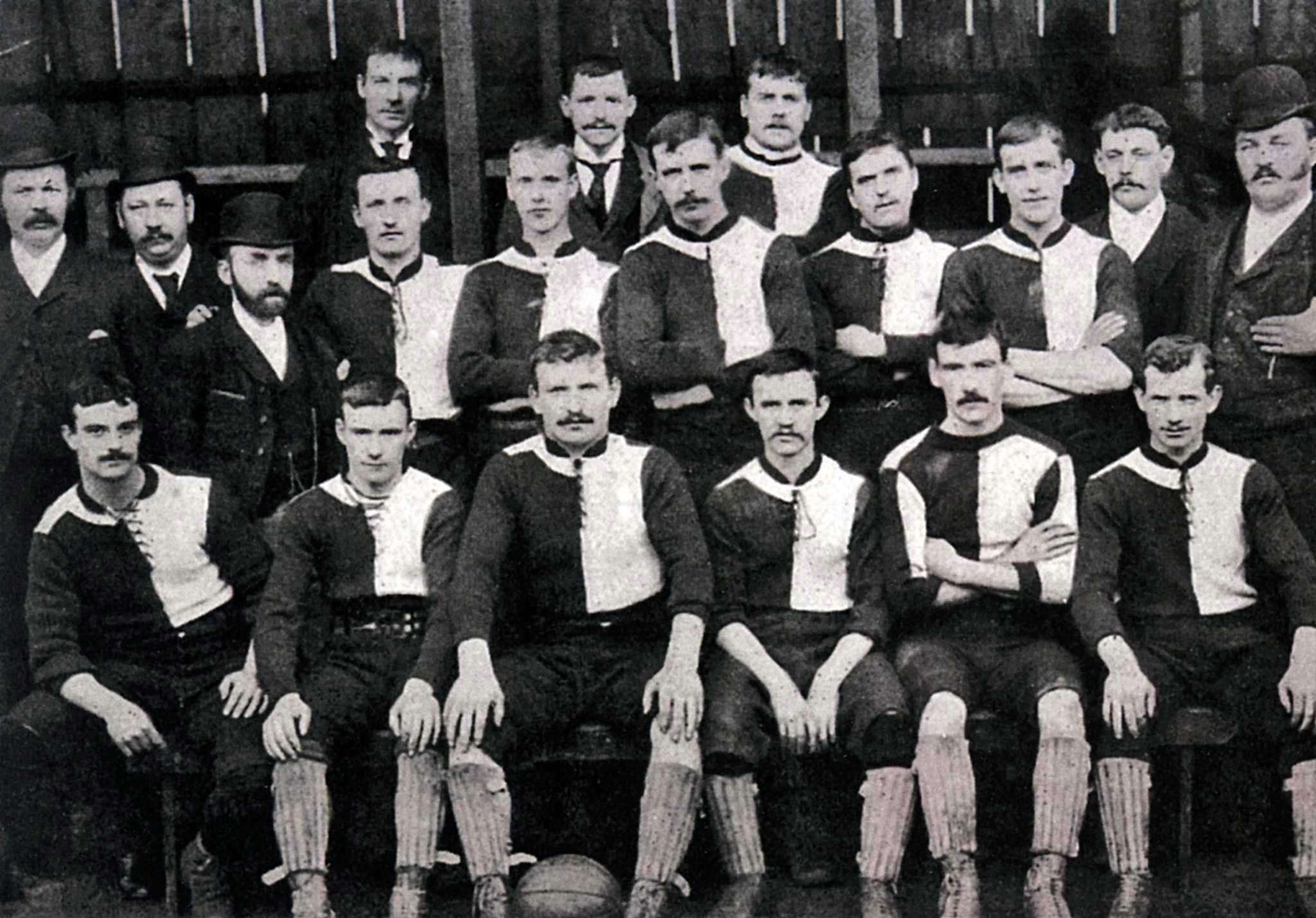
- Secretary: A. H. Albut
- Stadium: North Road Ground
- First Division: 16th
- FA Cup: Third Round
- Lancashire Senior Cup: First Round
- Manchester Senior Cup: Winners
- Top goalscorer: League: Bob Donaldson (16); All: Bob Donaldson (16)
- Highest home attendance: 15,000 vs Sunderland (4 March 1893)
- Lowest home attendance: 3,000 vs Derby County (31 December 1892); 3,000 vs Accrington (8 April 1893)
- Average home league attendance: 7,333
Home colours	Away colours

The 1892–93 season was Newton Heath's first season in the Football League. They finished last in Division One championship with 18 points and due to the absence of formal relegation from the league they were one of the teams that had to win a test match against a Second Division team in order to retain their place in the league for the following season. They beat Birmingham City after two matches to remain in the top division. Newton Heath lost to Blackburn Rovers in their opening match in the FA Cup this season.

== Football League First Division ==
Date	Opponents	H / A	Result F–A	Scorers	Attendance
3 September 1892	Blackburn Rovers	A	3–4	Coupar, Donaldson, Farman	8,000
10 September 1892	Burnley	H	1–1	Donaldson	10,000
17 September 1892	Burnley	A	1–4	Donaldson	7,000
24 September 1892	Everton	A	0–6		10,000
1 October 1892	West Bromwich Albion	A	0–0		4,000
8 October 1892	West Bromwich Albion	H	2–4	Donaldson, Hood	9,000
15 October 1892	Wolverhampton Wanderers	H	10–1	Donaldson (3), Stewart (3), Carson, Farman, Hendry, Hood	4,000
19 October 1892	Everton	H	3–4	Donaldson, Farman, Hood	4,000
22 October 1892	Sheffield Wednesday	A	0–1		6,000
29 October 1892	Nottingham Forest	A	1–1	Farman	6,000
5 November 1892	Blackburn Rovers	H	4–4	Farman (2), Carson, Hood	12,000
12 November 1892	Notts County	H	1–3	Carson	8,000
19 November 1892	Aston Villa	H	2–0	Coupar, Fitzsimmons	7,000
26 November 1892	Accrington	A	2–2	Colville, Fitzsimmons	3,000
3 December 1892	Bolton Wanderers	A	1–4	Coupar	3,000
10 December 1892	Bolton Wanderers	H	1–0	Donaldson	4,000
17 December 1892	Wolverhampton Wanderers	A	0–2		5,000
24 December 1892	Sheffield Wednesday	H	1–5	Hood	4,000
26 December 1892	Preston North End	A	1–2	Coupar	4,000
31 December 1892	Derby County	H	7–1	Donaldson (3), Farman (3), Fitzsimmons	3,000
7 January 1893	Stoke City	A	1–7	Coupar	1,000
14 January 1893	Nottingham Forest	H	1–3	Donaldson	8,000
26 January 1893	Notts County	A	0–4		1,000
11 February 1893	Derby County	A	1–5	Fitzsimmons	5,000
4 March 1893	Sunderland	H	0–5		15,000
6 March 1893	Aston Villa	A	0–2		4,000
31 March 1893	Stoke City	H	1–0	Farman	10,000
1 April 1893	Preston North End	H	2–1	Donaldson (2)	9,000
4 April 1893	Sunderland	A	0–6		3,500
8 April 1893	Accrington	H	3–3	Donaldson, Fitzsimmons, Stewart	3,000

Pos	Team	Pld	W	D	L	GF	GA	GAv	Pts	Relegation
12	The Wednesday	30	12	3	15	55	65	0.846	27	
13	Derby County	30	9	9	12	52	64	0.813	27	
14	Notts County (R)	30	10	4	16	53	61	0.869	24	Qualification for test matches
15	Accrington (R)	30	6	11	13	57	81	0.704	23	Resigned from league after test matches (Note: Accrington did not join the Second Division for the following season after losing their test match.)
16	Newton Heath (O)	30	6	6	18	50	85	0.588	18	Qualification for test matches

Source: World Football
Rules for classification: 1) Points; 2) Goal average; 3) Goals scored
(O) Play-off winners; (R) Relegated

=== Test match ===
As the last-placed finishers in the First Division, Newton Heath had to play a 'test match' on neutral ground against Small Heath, the winners of the Second Division, with the winners playing in the First Division next season. The game in Nottingham was drawn, necessitating a rematch in Sheffield, won by Newton Heath.

Date	Round	Opponents	Venue	Result F–A	Scorers	Attendance
22 April 1893	Test match	Small Heath	Victoria Ground	1–1	Farman	4,000
27 April 1893	Replay	Small Heath	Olive Grove	5–2	Farman (3), Cassidy, Coupar	6,000

== FA Cup ==
Date	Round	Opponents	Home/ Away	Result F–A	Scorers	Attendance
21 January 1893	Round 3	Blackburn Rovers	A	0–4		7,000

== Lancashire Senior Cup ==
Date	Round	Opponents	H / A	Result F–A	Scorers	Attendance
28 January 1893	Round 1	Bury	A	0–4		6,000

== Manchester Senior Cup ==
Date	Round	Opponents	H / A	Result F–A	Scorers	Attendance
25 February 1893	Round 3	West Manchester	A	2–1	Fitzsimmons (2)	10,000
18 March 1893	Semi-final	Bury	Hyde Road	3–1	Fitzsimmons (2), Donaldson	10,000
15 April 1893	Final	Bolton Wanderers	Hyde Road	2–1	Cassidy, Mitchell	6,000
