= 1890–91 Ardwick A.F.C. season =

English football club season

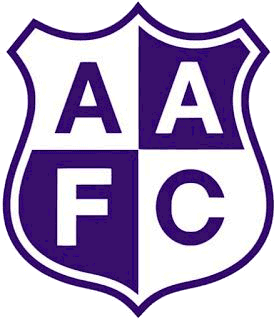
Ardwick A.F.C.
1890–91 season
- Manager: Lawrence Furniss
- FA Cup: Second qualifying round
- Top goalscorer: League: N/A; All: David Weir (3 goals)
- Highest home attendance: 4,000 vs Liverpool Stanley (4 October 1890)
Home colours

The 1890–91 season was the first season in which Ardwick A.F.C. competed in a national competitive football competition, having spent the first years of their existence playing friendly matches against local clubs, as well as recent participation in the Manchester Cup. The club entered the FA Cup in October 1890, comprehensively winning their first game, but were scratched from the tournament before their next game. Their 12–0 win over Liverpool Stanley remains their record biggest win in a competitive fixture.

== FA Cup ==
4 October 1890 Qualifying round 1	Ardwick	12–0	Liverpool Stanley	Manchester
	Weir; McWhinnie; Hodgetts; Campbell; Rushton; Whittle			Stadium: Hyde Road; Attendance: 4,000

25 October 1890 Qualifying round 2	Halliwell	Scratched	Ardwick	Bolton
				Stadium: Halliwell Cricket Field

== Squad statistics ==
=== Appearances and goals ===
No.	Pos	Nat	Player	Total		FA Cup	
No.	Pos	Nat	Player	Apps	Goals	Apps	Goals
			Campbell	1	2	1	2
	GK	(Scotland) SCO	William Douglas	1	0	1	0
	DF	(England) ENG	Tom Haydock	1	0	1	0
			Jack Hodgetts	1	2	1	2
			McWhinnie	1	2	1	2
	FW	(England) ENG	John Milne	1	0	1	0
	DF	(Scotland) SCO	David Robson	1	0	1	0
	MF	(England) ENG	Walter Rushton	1	2	1	2
			Simon	1	0	1	0
	FW	(England) ENG	David Weir	1	3	1	3
	DF	(England) ENG	Danny Whittle	1	1	1	1

=== Goals record ===
Rank	No.	Nat.	Po.	Name	FA Cup	Total
1		(England)	FW	David Weir	3	3
2				Campbell	2	2
2				Jack Hodgetts	2	2
2				McWhinnie	2	2
2		(England)	MF	Walter Rushton	2	2
6		(England)	DF	Danny Whittle	1	1
Total					12	12

== See also ==
- Manchester City F.C. seasons
