= Coupar =

Coupar may refer to

- Coupar Angus, a town in Perth and Kinross, Scotland
  - Coupar Angus Abbey
    - Abbot of Coupar Angus, the one-time head of the monastic community and lands of Coupar Angus Abbey
  - Coupar Angus F.C., a Scottish Junior football club
- Lord Coupar, a title associated with another title, Lord Balmerino

== People ==
- Paddy Coupar, a Scottish rugby league player
- Thomas Coupar, a Scottish football player born in 1862
- Jimmy Coupar, a Scottish football player born in 1869
- Peter Coupar, a Scottish football player born in 1866
