= Edwin Williams =

Edwin Williams may refer to:

- Edwin Williams (American football) (born 1986), American football offensive lineman
- Edwin Williams (rugby) (1898–1983), rugby union and rugby league footballer of the 1920s
- Edwin Williams (footballer) (1868–?), Welsh international footballer who played for Crewe Alexandra F.C.
- Edwin A. Williams (1847–1920), American politician
- Edwin Ross Williams (born 1942), physicist
- Edwin S. Williams (born 1948), American linguist
- Ed Williams (linebacker) (born 1961), American football linebacker
- Dib Williams (Edwin Dibrell Williams, 1910–1992), American second baseman and shortstop in Major League Baseball

== See also ==
- Edward Williams (disambiguation)
