= McKennie =

McKennie is a surname. Notable people with the surname include:

- William McKennie (1868–1902), Scottish footballer
- Weston McKennie (born 1998), American soccer player
