= John Wade =

John or Jonathan Wade may refer to:

- John Wade (MP for Lyme Regis) (14th century), English member of parliament for Lyme Regis in 1395
- John Wade (MP for City of London)
- John Wade (born 1893), American architect, designed the Buffalo City Hall
- John Wade (20th century), former Tennessee Commissioner of Tourist Development
- John Wade (American football) (born 1975), American football center
- John Wade (author) (1788–1875), British writer
- John Wade (miller) (1842 England–1931), Australian cornflour manufacturer
- John Wade (rower) (1928–2023), American Olympic rower
- John Chipman Wade (1817–1892), Canadian lawyer, politician
- John Donald Wade (1892–1963), American academic
- John Francis Wade (1711–1786), English hymnist
- John Wade (footballer) (1871–1937), English footballer
- John F.G. Wade (born 1968), United States Navy vice admiral
- Johnnie Wade (born 1932), British film and television actor
- Jonathan Wade (born 1984), American football cornerback
- Jonathan Wade (curler) (20th century), Australian curler

== See also ==
- Jack Wade (disambiguation)
- John Wade House, Massachusetts
