= Riddoch =

Riddoch may refer to:

- Riddoch syndrome
- Riddoch Highway
- Alexander Riddoch, eight times Provost of Dundee
- Dave Riddoch, Scottish footballer
- George Riddoch, Australian politician
- Greg Riddoch, American baseball player
- Ian Riddoch, Scottish chief executive
- John Riddoch, Australian politician
- Lesley Riddoch, British journalist
