= Edward Williams =

Edward, Ed or Eddie Williams may refer to:

== Entertainment ==
- Ed Williams (actor) (1926–2025), American actor
- Lil' Ed Williams (born 1955), American blues guitarist, singer and songwriter
- Edward Williams (engraver) (c. 1755–1797?), English engraver
- Edward Williams (painter) (1781–1855), English painter
- Eddie Williams (saxophonist) (1910–1977), American musician
- Edward Williams (composer) (1921–2013), British composer
- Edward Charles Williams (1807–1881), English landscape painter
- Edward Christopher Williams (1871–1929), African-American librarian and author

== Law ==
- Edward Vaughan Williams (1797–1875), English judge
- Edward Williams (Victorian judge) (1813–1880), judge from Victoria, Australia
- Edward Bennett Williams (1920–1988), American lawyer and sports team owner
- Edward Williams (Queensland judge) (1921–1999), judge from Queensland, Australia

== Military ==
- Edward Ellerker Williams (1793–1822), British Army officer
- Edward Williams (British Army officer) (1892–1977), British Army officer and cricketer
- Edward Thomas Williams (1901–1973), U.S. Army general
- Alexander Williams (British Army officer) (Edward Alexander Wilmot Williams, 1910–1994), British general

== Politics ==
- Edward Williams (died c. 1594), member (MP) of the Parliament of England for Camelford, 1571, and for St. Ives, 1572
- Edward Williams (died 1721) (1659–1721), English politician, MP for Breconshire
- Ted Williams (politician) (Edward John Williams, 1890–1963), British politician and diplomat
- Eddie Joe Williams (born 1954), American politician in Arkansas
- Edward David Williams (1842–1909), member of the Parliament of Victoria, Australia
- G. Edward Williams (1885–1940), American lawyer and member of the Mississippi Senate

== Sports ==
=== American football ===
- Ed Williams (running back) (born 1950), American football player for the Cincinnati Bengals and Tampa Bay Buccaneers
- Edward Williams (American football) (born 1982), American football wide receiver
- Eddie Williams (American football) (born 1987), American football fullback for the Washington Redskins and Chicago Bears
- Eddie Williams Jr. (born 2001), American football player
- Eddie Lee Williams (born 1979), American football player

=== Other sports ===
- Edward Williams (footballer) (fl. 1903–1905), soccer player
- Edward Williams (rower) (1888–1915), British rower
- Edward Williams (British Army officer) (1892–1977), English cricketer
- Edward Williams (bowls) (1911–?), South African lawn bowler
- Edward Williams (cricketer, born 1925) (1925–2013), English cricketer
- Edward Williams (biathlete) (born 1942), American Olympic biathlete
- Eddie Williams (baseball) (born 1964), American baseball player
- Eddie Williams (strongman), Australian strongman and singer

== Others ==
- Iolo Morganwg (born Edward Williams, 1747–1826), Welsh antiquarian
- Edward Williams (iron-master) (1826–1886), iron-master and grandson of Iolo Morganwg
- Edward Williams (businessman) (1843–1903), American businessman who co-founded Sherwin-Williams
- Edward Williams (minister) (1750–1813), Welsh nonconformist minister, theological writer, and tutor
- Edward Williams (antiquary) (1762–1833), English antiquary
- Edward Marsh Williams (1818–1908), missionary, interpreter, and judge
- Edward H. Williams (1824–1899), American physician and railroad executive
- Edward Leader Williams (1828–1910), English engineer
- Edward E. Williams (1945–2018), American economist
- Edward Wyckoff Williams (born 1978), African-American author and political and economic analyst
- Eddie Williams (activist) (1932–2017), black rights activist
- Edward F. Williams (shipbuilder) (1826–1902), American shipbuilder
- Edward F. Williams (pilot boat), a 19th-century Sandy Hook pilot boat
- Sir Edward Williams, 5th Baronet (1728–1804), Welsh landowner

== See also ==
- Ed Williams (disambiguation)
- Edwin Williams (disambiguation)
- Ted Williams (disambiguation)
- Teddy Williams (disambiguation)
