= Harry Tyrer (footballer, born 1868) =

English footballer

Personal information
- Full name: Henry Tyrer
- Date of birth: 26 July 1868
- Place of birth: Halsall, England
- Date of death: 1935 (aged 67)
- Position: Forward

Youth career
- 1887: Turton

Senior career*
Years	Team	Apps	(Gls)
1888–1889	Bolton Wanderers	14	(2)
1889	Blackpool		
1895–1898	Darwen	83	(21)
1898–1899	Newcastle United	0	(0)
1898	Turton		
- * Club domestic league appearances and goals

Henry Tyrer (26 July 1868 – 1935) was an English footballer who played in the Football League for Bolton Wanderers and Darwen.

== 1888-1889 ==
Harry Tyrer made his League debut on 15 September 1888, playing as a winger, at Pike's Lane, then home of Bolton Wanderers. The opposition were Burnley and Bolton Wanderers lost the match 4–3. When Harry Tyrer played as a winger against Burnley on 15 September 1888 he was 20 years 51 days old; which made him, on that second weekend of League football, Bolton Wanderers' youngest player in place of James Brogan. Harry Tyrer scored his debut League goal on 29 September 1888, playing as a winger, at Pike's Lane when the opposition were Everton. Harry Tyrer scored the second and third goals as Bolton Wanderers won the match 6–2. Harry Tyrer played in 14 of the 22 League games played by Bolton Wanderers in season 1888–89 and scored two League goals. Harry Tyrer played as a winger in a Bolton Wanderers midfield that assisted the team achieve big (three-League-goals-or-more) wins on two occasions. Harry Tyrer two League goals came in the same match
