= Rushton =

Rushton can refer to the following:

== People with the surname ==
- Dave Rushton (born 1973), English footballer
- Herbert J. Rushton (1877–1947), American politician
- J. Philippe Rushton (1943–2012), Canadian psychology professor
- Julian Rushton (born 1941), English musicologist
- Michael Rushton (born 1950), English blues-rock and indie drummer
- Tim Rushton, choreographer and artist director of the Danish Dance Theatre, Copenhagen
- W. A. H. Rushton, physiology professor in Cambridge and former president of the Society for Psychical Research
- Walter Rushton, English footballer
- Willie Rushton, William George Rushton, English cartoonist, satirist, comedian, actor and performer

== People with the given name ==
- Rushton Paray, Trinidad and Tobago politician

== Places ==
- Rushton, Cheshire
- Rushton, Northamptonshire
- Rushton, Staffordshire
- Rushton Triangular Lodge
- Rushton Park, Mandurah
- Tarrant Rushton

== Other ==
- Rushton Hall, home of James John Van Alen, in Rushton, Northamptonshire, England
- Rushton turbine, agitator designed for gas dispersion and high shear mixing

== See also ==
- Rushden (disambiguation)
