= James Colville =

James Colville may refer to:

- James Colville (footballer), played for Newton Heath during the 1892–93 season, for Anne Bank and Fairfield Athletic
- James Colville (judge) (died 1540), Scottish administrator, lord of session and diplomat
- James Colville, 1st Lord Colville of Culross (1551–1629), Scottish soldier and courtier
- James William Colvile (1810–1880), British lawyer, civil servant and judge
