= Ted Williams (disambiguation) =

Ted Williams (1918–2002) was an American baseball player

Ted Williams may also refer to:

- Ted Williams (back) (1916–1993), American football back
- Ted Williams (American football coach) (born 1943), American football coach
- Ted Williams (equestrian) (1912–1993), British show-jump rider, active in the 1950s and 1960s
- Ted Williams (Australian footballer) (1912–1964), Australian rules footballer
- Ted Williams (media personality) (born 1957), American radio announcer
- Ted Williams Tunnel, a tunnel in Boston named after the baseball player

== See also ==
- Edward Williams (disambiguation)
- Tad Williams (born 1957), American writer
- Teddy Williams (disambiguation)
