= Teddy Williams =

Teddy Williams may refer to:

- Teddy Williams (American football) (born 1988), American football cornerback
- Teddy Williams (rugby union) (born 2000), Welsh rugby union player.
- Teddy Williams (tennis) (1866–1911), British tennis player active in the 19th century.
- Luke Williams (wrestler) (born 1947)
- Eduardo Williams (born 1987), Argentine film director nicknamed "Teddy"

== See also ==
- Ted Williams (disambiguation)
- Edward Williams (disambiguation)
