= Jack Wade =

Jack Wade may refer to:

- Jack Wade (footballer) (1907–1941), Australian rules footballer
- Jack Wade (James Bond), a character in two James Bond films
- Jack Wade, Alaska, an unincorporated community

== See also ==
- John Wade (disambiguation)
