= David Fitzsimmons =

Scottish footballer

David Fitzsimmons (14 February 1875 – 1931) was a Scottish footballer. His regular position was as a half back. Born in Annbank, Ayrshire, he played for Annbank, Fairfield Athletic, Wigan County and two spells at Manchester United (then known as Newton Heath). His elder brother Tommy, a forward, also played for Newton Heath, Fairfield and Wigan.
