= Ed Williams =

Ed Williams may refer to:

- Ed Williams (actor) (1926–2025), American actor
- Ed Williams (running back) (born 1950), American football running back
- Ed Williams (linebacker) (born 1961), American football linebacker
- Ed Williams (wide receiver) (born 1991), American football wide receiver
- Ed Williams (footballer) (born 1995), English footballer
- Ed Williams (javelin thrower) (born 1954), American javelin thrower, 1975 NCAA runner-up for the Alabama Crimson Tide track and field team

== See also ==
- Edward Williams (disambiguation)
