= G. Owen =

English footballer

Personal information
- Position: Winger

Senior career*
Years	Team	Apps	(Gls)
1888–1889	Bolton Wanderers	7	(3)
- * Club domestic league appearances and goals

G. Owen was an English footballer who played in the Football League for Bolton Wanderers. He played in the inaugural Football League season of 1888–89 and played 7 matches and scored three goals. His debut was on 8 December 1888, at Leamington Road, Blackburn, then home of Blackburn Rovers. Owen replaced Davie Weir at centre-forward, the latter had moved to right-half. Within 8 minutes of the start Wanderers were 2–0 down and then got one back. As the half wore on both sides had chances to score but Wanderers got an equaliser to make it 2–2 at half-time. With the 2nd half under way again both teams could have taken the lead. However, Wanderers did get a grip on the match as they took a 4–2 lead. But Rovers, one of the best teams of 1888–89, came back and made it 4–4 at full-time. Owen's debut goal was scored on 22 December 1888 at Pike's Lane, Bolton, when the visitors were Accrington. The first half was tight and Wanderers' goal, to give them a 1–0 lead, was controversial, as Accrington players claimed the ball had gone over the bar, not under (there were no nets in those days). Accrington equalised early in the second half, but then Wanderers ran away with it with Owen's debut goal completing the scoring at 4–1. Owen's last game of the season was on 5 March 1889. He made 3 appearances at inside left, 3 at outside left and 1 at centre forward. Wanderers finished the season in 5th place. Owen scored 3 goals and assisted Wanderers to score 63 goals in 22 games, the 3rd highest of the season. Owen only played the one season.
