= James Parkinson (footballer) =

English footballer (1862–1927)

Personal information
- Date of birth: 9 November 1862
- Place of birth: Bolton, England
- Date of death: 6 December 1927 (aged 65)
- Position: Goalkeeper

Senior career*
Years	Team	Apps	(Gls)
1883–1891	Bolton Wanderers	26	(1)
- * Club domestic league appearances and goals

James Parkinson (9 November 1862 – 6 December 1927) was an English footballer who played in the Football League for Bolton Wanderers.

== 1883-1891 ==
James Parkinson made his League and Club debut, playing at full–back, on 15 September 1888 at Pike's Lane, then home of Bolton Wanderers. The opposition were Burnley and Bolton Wanderers lost the match 4–3. James Parkinson appeared in two of the 22 League games played by Bolton Wanderers in season 1888–89. James Parkinson, as goalkeeper, (one appearance) was part of a Bolton Wanderers defence that kept the opposition to one-League-goal-in-a-match once. Parkinson played for Bolton from 1883 winning the Bolton Charity Cup 4 times and the Lancashire Senior Cup once in 1885–86. He also won the Derbyshire Cup with the club. He represented the Lancashire select side on at least 3 occasions playing alongside fellow Bolton player Kenny Davenport. His full appearance recorded record is 38 games and 1 goal, though pre-league matches were not recorded and he would have played considerably more. Jeff Williamson BWFC RESEARCHER.
