= W. Flitcroft =

English footballer

Personal information
- Position: Full back

Senior career*
Years	Team	Apps	(Gls)
1888–1889	Bolton Wanderers	8	(0)
- * Club domestic league appearances and goals

W. Flitcroft was an English footballer who played in the Football League for Bolton Wanderers.

He played in the inaugural Football League season of 1888-1889 and played 7 matches. His debut was in the 2nd month of the season, October 1888. W Flitcroft, playing as a full-back, made his Bolton Wanderers and League debut on 20 October 1888, at Pike's Lane, the then home of Bolton Wanderers and the visitors were Aston Villa. The home team lost 3–2. Flitcroft appeared in seven of the 22 League Matches played by Bolton Wanderers in season 1888-89.

He was retained for season 1889-1890 but only played one match, his last for Bolton Wanderers and in the League.
