= Rushden (disambiguation) =

Rushden is a town in Northamptonshire, England.

Rushden may also refer to:

- Rushden, Hertfordshire, England, a village
- Rushden railway station in the Northamptonshire town
- Max Rushden (born 1979), English radio and television presenter

== See also ==
- Rushton (disambiguation)
