= Tom Forrester =

English footballer (1864–?)

Personal information
- Full name: Thomas Forrester
- Date of birth: June 1864
- Place of birth: Stoke-upon-Trent, England
- Position: Forward

Senior career*
Years	Team	Apps	(Gls)
1887	Trentham		
1888–1889	Stoke	0	(0)
1889–1892	Stoke St Peter's		
1892–1894	Ardwick	10	(2)
- * Club domestic league appearances and goals

Thomas Forrester (June 1864 – ?) was an English footballer who played as a forward for Ardwick and Stoke.

== Career ==
Forrester played for Trentham before he joined Stoke in 1888. He was a member of Stoke's reserve side the 'Swifts' and was overlooked by manager Harry Lockett for the first team. His only senior appearance came in the FA Cup against Warwick County. Stoke lost and most of the reserve players including Forrester were released. He later went on to play for Stoke St Peter's.

From there he joined Ardwick on 5 October 1892. He made his Football League debut on 26 November 1892 against Burton Swifts and went on to score twice in 10 appearances for Ardwick.

== Career statistics ==
Appearances and goals by club, season and competition
Club	Season	League			FA Cup		Total	
Club	Season	Division	Apps	Goals	Apps	Goals	Apps	Goals
Stoke	1888–89	The Football League	0	0	1	0	1	0
Ardwick	1892–93	Second Division	4	1	0	0	4	1
Ardwick	1893–94	Second Division	6	1	0	0	6	1
Career total			10	2	1	0	11	2
