= Jimmy Turner (English footballer) =

English footballer (1866–1903)

Personal information
- Full name: James Turner
- Date of birth: 6 October 1866
- Place of birth: Stoke-upon-Trent, England
- Date of death: 25 November 1903 (aged 37)
- Position: Left half

Youth career
- 1887: Black Lane Rovers

Senior career*
Years	Team	Apps	(Gls)
1889–1894	Bolton Wanderers	96	(8)
1894–1896	Stoke	52	(1)
1896–1898	Derby County	51	(1)
1898–1899	Stoke	7	(0)

International career
1893–1898	England	3	(0)
- * Club domestic league appearances and goals

James Turner (6 October 1866 – 25 November 1903) was an English footballer, who played in the Football League for Bolton Wanderers, Derby County and Stoke. He also gained three caps for England.

== Career ==
Turner was born in Stoke-upon-Trent but started his football career at Black Lane Rovers F.C. in 1887. The following year he moved to Bolton Wanderers where he spent six seasons making 103 appearances for the "Trotters" before joining his home town club Stoke in August 1894. In the 1894–95 season Stoke struggled and had to play a test match against Newton Heath to remain in the First Division, Stoke won the match 3–0 and stayed up. Turner established himself at left half for the 1895–96 season making 27 appearances. He joined Derby County in 1896 where he spent two seasons reaching the 1898 FA Cup Final losing out to Nottingham Forest before he re-joined Stoke in 1898. He played seven matches before retiring due to injury.

== Career statistics ==
=== Club ===
Appearances and goals by club, season and competition
Club	Season	League			FA Cup		Test Match		Total	
Club	Season	Division	Apps	Goals	Apps	Goals	Apps	Goals	Apps	Goals
Bolton Wanderers	1888–89	The Football League	2	1	3	3	–		5	4
Bolton Wanderers	1889–90	The Football League	6	1	0	0	–		6	1
Bolton Wanderers	1890–91	The Football League	12	4	1	0	–		13	4
Bolton Wanderers	1891–92	The Football League	23	2	1	0	–		24	2
Bolton Wanderers	1892–93	First Division	29	0	2	0	–		31	0
Bolton Wanderers	1893–94	First Division	24	0	0	0	–		24	0
Bolton Wanderers	Total		96	8	7	3	0	0	103	10
Stoke	1894–95	First Division	26	0	2	0	1	0	29	0
Stoke	1895–96	First Division	24	1	3	0	–		27	1
Stoke	Total		50	1	5	0	1	0	56	1
Derby County	1896–97	First Division	21	1	4	0	–		25	1
Derby County	1897–98	First Division	26	0	6	0	–		32	0
Derby County	Total		51	1	10	0	0	0	61	1
Stoke	1898–99	First Division	7	0	0	0	–		7	0
Career total			204	10	22	3	1	0	227	13

=== International ===
National team	Year	Apps	Goals
England	1893	1	0
England	1895	1	0
England	1898	1	0
Total		3	0

== Honours ==
Derby County

- FA Cup runner-up: 1897–98
