= Peter Bullough =

English footballer

Personal information
- Full name: Peter Adam Bullough
- Date of birth: Q2 1865
- Place of birth: Lostock, England
- Date of death: 1933 (aged 67–68)
- Position: Right-half

Senior career*
Years	Team	Apps	(Gls)
1888–1892	Bolton Wanderers	38	(4)
- * Club domestic league appearances and goals

Peter Adam Bullough (1865–1933) was an English footballer who played in the Football League for Bolton Wanderers.

Peter Bullough made his League debut on 8 September 1888 at Pike's Lane, then home of Bolton Wanderers, against Derby County. Bolton Wanderers lost the match 6–3. He scored his debut League goal on 17 November 1888 at Pike's Lane against West Bromwich Albion in a 2–1 defeat. He played 15 of the 22 League games played by Bolton Wanderers in the 1888–89 Football League season and scored once.
