= Robert Roberts (footballer, born 1864) =

Welsh footballer

Personal information
- Date of birth: July 1864
- Place of birth: Penycae, Wales
- Date of death: 15 March 1932 (aged 67)
- Place of death: Wrexham, Wales
- Position: Wing half

Youth career
- 1882-1884: Druids
- 1884-1885: Bolton Wanderers

Senior career*
Years	Team	Apps	(Gls)
1885–1892	Bolton Wanderers	71	(3)
1892	Preston North End	5	(0)
1892–1893	Lincoln City	16	(3)

International career
1884–1892	Wales	9	(1)
- * Club domestic league appearances and goals

Robert Roberts (July 1864 – 15 March 1932) was a Welsh professional footballer who played at wing half for several clubs, spending most of his career with Bolton Wanderers in the English Football League. He made a total of ten appearances for Wales.

== Playing career ==
Roberts was born at Penycae, near Wrexham and, on leaving school, obtained employment in a terracotta works. He joined Druids, based in the neighbouring village of Ruabon, as an amateur in 1882 and helped them reach the fifth round (last eight) of the F.A. Cup in 1883. Roberts replaced Jack Powell in the third round replay against Bolton Wanderers and retained his place for the quarter-final match, losing 4–1 to eventual winners Blackburn Olympic.

Druids also had a long run in the Welsh Cup, reaching the final for the fifth year out of the six since the competition was inaugurated in 1877. Roberts played in the final on 21 April 1883, with Druids losing 1–0 to Wrexham. Druids reached the Welsh Cup final again the following year, this time to lose 1–0 to Oswestry White Stars in a replay.

The week before the 1884 Welsh Cup Final, Roberts was called up for his first appearance for Wales, when he took the place of Jack Powell at right back for the final match of the 1884 British Home Championship against Scotland on 29 March. Although Roberts scored after seven minutes, Scotland equalised midway through the first half and ran out 4–1 winners to claim the trophy with three victories.

In April 1884, Roberts moved to Lancashire to join Bolton Wanderers in the Football League, where he was re-united with several former Druids players, including Jack Powell and Jackie Vaughan, both of whom had moved to Bolton the previous year.

Described as "a good athlete and an useful boxer", Roberts had a "burly frame" and soon became an established member of the Wanderers' eleven. Roberts scored on his debut, in a friendly match against Preston North End and was soon converted to a wing-half. In 1887, Bolton Wanderers were involved in a protracted first round F.A. Cup match against Everton. Roberts scored the only goal of the initial match played on 15 October 1887, but the result was declared invalid as Bolton had fielded an ineligible player, Robert Struthers. There then followed two drawn matches (with Roberts again scoring in the first), before Everton won the second replay (the fourth match altogether) 2–1. This time, however, Everton were disqualified for fielding two professional players who had been registered as amateurs, and the match was awarded to Bolton, who were then defeated 9–1 by Preston North End, with Jimmy Ross scoring six goals.

Bolton were one of the twelve founder members of the Football League, which formed in 1888. Bob Roberts made his League debut on 8 September 1888, playing at wing-half, at Pike's Lane, then home of Bolton Wanderers. The opposition were Derby County. Bolton Wanderers lost the match 6–3. His debut League goal was scored on 6 October 1888 at Turf Moor, home of Burnley Bob Roberts scored Bolton Wanderers only goal in a 4–1 defeat. In the inaugural Football League season, Roberts was ever-present, scoring twice. Bob Roberts was one of five Bolton Wanderers players, who, in season 1888–89 played in every (22) League game. The other four, apart from Roberts, were, James Brogan, Kenny Davenport, John Milne and Davie Weir. Bob Roberts played as a Full–Back (two appearances) in a Bolton Wanderers defence that kept the opposition down to one–League–goal–in–a–match once. Bob Roberts played as a wing–half (20 appearances) in a Bolton Wanderers midfield that achieved big (three–League–goals–or–more) wins on five occasions.

In 1889, Roberts was described as "a very fast man (120 yards in 13 seconds), a splendid dribbler and difficult to overcome in possession of the ball". One newspaper dubbed him "the best half back in England".

Roberts remained at Bolton until March 1892, when he moved to Preston North End where he played five league matches at the end of the 1891–92 season. Later that year, he dropped down to the Second Division, spending one season with Lincoln City before retiring.

== Later career ==
On completing his playing career, Roberts was briefly trainer to Leicester Fosse before returning to settle in the Wrexham area.

Towards the end of his life, he lived in the almshouses at Ruabon where he was known as "Bob Bolton". The walls of his room were said to be covered in photographs of Bolton, Preston and Wales, leaving little room for anything else.

== International appearances ==
Roberts made nine appearances for Wales in official international matches, as follows:

Date	Venue	Opponent	Result	Goals	Competition
29 March 1884	Cathkin Park, Glasgow	Scotland	1–4	1	British Home Championship
21 March 1887	Racecourse Ground, Wrexham	Scotland	0–2	0	British Home Championship
4 February 1888	Nantwich Road, Crewe	England	1–5	0	British Home Championship
10 March 1888	Easter Road, Edinburgh	Scotland	1–5	0	British Home Championship
23 February 1889	Victoria Ground, Stoke-on-Trent	England	1–4	0	British Home Championship
15 April 1889	Racecourse Ground, Wrexham	Scotland	0–0	0	British Home Championship
22 March 1890	Racecourse Ground, Wrexham	Scotland	0–5	0	British Home Championship
27 February 1892	Penrhyn Park, Bangor	Ireland	1–1	0	British Home Championship
26 March 1892	Tynecastle Park, Edinburgh	Scotland	1–6	0	British Home Championship

In addition, he appeared in the second match played against a visiting Canadian XI in 1891.

== Honours ==
Druids

- Welsh Cup finalist: 1883, 1884
