= James Colville (footballer) =

English footballer

Personal information
- Position: Forward

Senior career*
Years	Team	Apps	(Gls)
?–1892	Annbank		
1892–1893	Newton Heath	9	(1)
1893–?	Fairfield		
- * Club domestic league appearances and goals

James Colville was a footballer. His regular position was as a forward. He played for Newton Heath during the 1892–93 season, as well as for Annbank and Fairfield.
