= Bethell Robinson =

English footballer

Personal information
- Full name: Bethell Robinson
- Date of birth: May 1861
- Place of birth: Fleetwood, Lancashire, England
- Date of death: 26 October 1933 (aged 72)
- Place of death: Rochford, Essex, England
- Position: Defender

Senior career*
Years	Team	Apps	(Gls)
1887–1888	Preston North End	0	(0)
1888–1889	Bolton Wanderers	16	(0)
1889	West Bromwich Albion	0	(0)
1889	Bolton Wanderers	2	(0)
1889	West Bromwich Albion	0	(0)
1889–1891	Bolton Wanderers	20	(0)
	→ Newton Heath (loan)	0	(0)
1891	West Bromwich Albion	0	(0)
- Hyde
- Darwen
- Bootle
- * Club domestic league appearances and goals

Bethell Robinson (1861 – 26 October 1933) was an English footballer who played in the Football League for Bolton Wanderers. He also played for Preston North End (the season they reached the FA Cup Final; It is unknown if Harrison played in the Cup run), West Bromwich Albion, Newton Heath, Hyde, Darwen and Bootle.

== 1888-1889 ==
Bethell Robinson made his Football League debut on 8 September 1888, as a full-back, at Pike's Lane, the then home of Bolton Wanderers. The opposition were Derby County and Bolton Wanderers lost the match 6–3. When Robinson played at full–back on 20 October 1888 against Aston Villa he was approximately 27 years 158 days old; which made him, on the seventh weekend of League football, Bolton Wanderers' oldest player. Robinson played in 16 of the 22 League games played by Bolton Wanderers in season 1888–89. Robinson, as a full-back, played in Bolton Wanderers defence that achieved one League clean-sheet and kept the opposition to one-League-goal-in-a-match on four separate occasions. Even though a Bolton Wanderers player Bethel Robinson appeared for West Bromwich Albion in the 1888–89 FA Cup. Robinson played full-back including in the semi-final at Bramall Lane, against "The Invincibles" Preston North End. West Bromwich Albion lost the semi-final 1–0.
