= Sam Gillam =

Welsh footballer

Personal information
- Full name: Samuel Gladstone Gillam
- Date of birth: 17 February 1867
- Place of birth: Swindon, England
- Date of death: 13 October 1938
- Place of death: Chard, England
- Position: Goalkeeper

Senior career*
| Years | Team | Apps | (Gls) |
| 1884–1886 | Wrexham Lever | | |
| 1886–1888 | Wrexham Olympic | | |
| 1888 | Bolton Wanderers | 2 | (0) |
| 1888–1889 | Wrexham | | |
| 1889–1890 | Shrewsbury Town | | |
| 1890 | Chirk | | |
| 1890–1893 | London Welsh | | |
| 1893–189? | Clapton | | |
| 189?–189? | Brighton Athletic | | |
| 1898–1904 | West Hampstead | | |

International career
| 1889–1894 | Wales | 5 | (0) |
- * Club domestic league appearances and goals

Samuel Gladstone Gillam (17 February 1867 – 13 October 1938) was a Wales international football goalkeeper, who played for various clubs in England and Wales in the 1880s and 1890s, including a brief career in the Football League with Bolton Wanderers. He was the first player to come on as a substitute in international football.

== Football career ==
Gillam was born in Swindon, Wiltshire but started his football career in Wrexham in north Wales when he joined Wrexham Lever F.C. as a teenager. (No records for this club appear to exist). After two years, he moved to Wrexham Olympic for two years, before another, temporary move to England.

For the start of the inaugural Football League season, Gillam had agreed to join Everton but he "failed to turn up at the last minute" for Everton's first pre-season friendly. He subsequently joined Bolton Wanderers for whom he only made two appearances; ironically, his debut for Bolton came at Everton on 5 November when he stood in for Wanderers regular keeper Charlie Harrison. The match report in The Liverpool Mercury said "The visitors brought a strong eleven including Gillan (sic) who was to have kept goal for the home club this season." Another match report said that Gillam "defended his charge in marvellous fashion, accounting for shot after shot in a style that brought forth hearty cheers"; despite his efforts, Everton won the match 2–1. His only other Football League appearance came in a 5–2 defeat at home to Preston North End, who were to go through the season undefeated.

By the end of the year, he had returned to Wrexham. On 15 April 1889, Wales were playing their British Home Championship match against Scotland at the Racecourse Ground. Wrexham; the regular goalkeeper, Jim Trainer, failed to turn up for the match, as Preston North End refused to release him. The kick-off was delayed while a replacement was sought; eventually the match got underway with local amateur player Alf Pugh in goal, before Gillam arrived some twenty minutes into the match to take over. Neither 'keeper conceded a goal and the match ended 0–0; this was the first time in 14 matches between the countries that the Scots had failed to defeat the Welsh, and only the second international match in which neither team had managed to score, the first being the very first officially recognised international match, between Scotland and England on 30 November 1872. This was also the first use of a substitute in international football.

Gillam retained his place as the Welsh international 'keeper for the next three matches (two victories against Ireland and a defeat against England), before Trainer was recalled.

His connection with the Wrexham club ended in October 1889, after which he had brief spells with Shrewsbury Town and Chirk. In 1890, he moved to London and joined London Welsh for three years, becoming team captain. In 1893, he joined Clapton where he made his final international appearance, when he was called into the team as a replacement for the unavailable Trainer, in a 5–2 defeat against Scotland.

He later briefly moved to the Brighton Athletic club, before joining West Hampstead. Although his business commitments restricted his football appearances, he remained on West Hampstead's books until 1904.

=== International appearances ===
Gillam made five appearances for Wales as follows:

| Date | Venue | Opponent | Result | Goals | Competition |
|---|---|---|---|---|---|
| 15 April 1889 | Racecourse Ground, Wrexham | Scotland | 0–0 | 0 | British Home Championship |
| 27 April 1889 | Ulster Cricket Ground, Belfast | Ireland | 3–1 | 0 | British Home Championship |
| 8 February 1890 | Old Racecourse, Shrewsbury | Ireland | 5–2 | 0 | British Home Championship |
| 15 March 1890 | Racecourse Ground, Wrexham | England | 1–3 | 0 | British Home Championship |
| 24 March 1894 | Rugby Park, Kilmarnock | Scotland | 2–5 | 0 | British Home Championship |

| Win | Draw | Loss |

== Career after football ==
Gillam became a hotelier in Cullompton in Devon and later took charge of the Crown Hotel in Fore Street, Chard, Somerset, where he died in October 1938.
