= Edward Wyckoff Williams =

American journalist and banker

- Born: February 6, 1977 (age 49)
- Education: Yale (1998); Oxford (2003)
- Occupation: Journalist

Edward Wyckoff Williams (born 6 February 1978) is an American television producer, correspondent, columnist, political analyst and former investment banker; whose work has appeared on NBC, MSNBC, Al Jazeera, BuzzFeed, PBS, ABC, CNN, CBS, BBC, VICE Media, NPR and national syndicated radio.

== Early life and education ==
Williams was born in Newark, New Jersey, to Edward Wyckoff Williams (1951–2008) and Audrey (née Felton), and was educated at the preparatory school Newark Academy in Livingston, New Jersey, and then Yale University in New Haven, Connecticut, where he was president of the Freshman Class Council. He received his Bachelors in Economics and History from Yale in 1998. While at Yale, Williams interned at the White House in the office of Vice President Al Gore, serving on the staff of Gregory Simon, Gore's Domestic Policy Advisor. He later worked as a legislative aide for Senator Frank Lautenberg.

Williams attended the University of Oxford in England, where he was a member of Oriel College. He completed his Masters of Philosophy degree in Comparative Social Policy from Oxford in 2003 and then began his professional career, working in management consulting and investment banking in the City of London.

== Career ==
Williams has been a contributing editor to The Root, a magazine for African-American news and culture, and a featured columnist for The Washington Post, Slate, Salon, The Advocate, Out Magazine, VICE Media, Ebony Magazine, The Grio and The Huffington Post.

Williams' work has focused on a range of socio-political issues, with interviews of major political figures and notable personalities including U.S. Attorney General Eric Holder; New York City Mayor Bill de Blasio; President Barack Obama's Cabinet Secretary Julian Castro; comedian and actor Chris Rock; former Newark Mayor and current New Jersey Senator Cory Booker; Martin Luther King III activist and eldest son of the civil rights leader; Sybrina Fulton and Tracy Martin, the parents of slain teenager Trayvon Martin; Kentucky's Democratic Governor Steve Beshear on his role in the implementation of Obamacare; Congressman Steve Israel, chairman of the Democratic Congressional Campaign Committee; and National Football League wide receiver Laveranues Coles about his career and surviving childhood sexual abuse.

Williams was a regular guest on nationally syndicated radio programs, most notably Chicago's WVON 1690AM; NPR Baltimore Affiliate WEAA 88.9FM; Radio One Inside Detroit with Mildred Gaddis; California's KPFA 94.1FM, Hard Knock Radio and New York's Equality Pride Radio WWRL 1600AM. His work was also featured on National Public Radio by NPR's Talk of the Nation with Neal Conan.

Williams was a contributor to Al Jazeera America and appeared on Al Jazeera, MSNBC, ABC, CBS, BBC and CNN as a political commentator discussing a range of topics including gay and minority rights, healthcare, education, immigration reform, international affairs and President Barack Obama.

In January 2015, Williams received two GLAAD Media Award nominations, the first in Outstanding Television Journalism for "Gay and Muslim in America", a piece he produced and reported for AlJazeera; and the second in Outstanding Digital Journalism for a written piece, "Black Parents, Gay Sons and Redefining Masculinity". He was the only nominee that year whose work was honored twice.

That same year, the United Nations featured Williams in its United Nations Free & Equal campaign highlighting accomplished journalists, activists and laypersons for the International Day Against Homophobia, Transphobia and Biphobia. The historic video promotion appeared in New York's Times Square on the Reuters and NASDAQ screens and included then UN Secretary-General Ban Ki-moon.

In 2017, Williams was named senior producer for talent and booking at BuzzFeed ahead of the launch of their daily news and entertainment programming. During his tenure he produced segments with major celebrities and politicians, including Dolly Parton, Angela Bassett, Priyanka Chopra, Seth Rogen, Madeleine Albright, Jada Pinkett-Smith, Lena Waithe, Gina Rodriguez, Elijah Wood, Anthony Bourdain, Michael Phelps, Gabrielle Union, Rob Reiner, Sting, Clive Davis, Jim Gaffigan, Terry Crews, Lin-Manuel Miranda, Erykah Badu, Mark Ruffalo, Elizabeth Banks, Chrissy Teigen, Questlove, Senator Kamala Harris, Issa Rae and many others. His work was honored at the 10th Annual Shorty Awards as a finalist in Live News Coverage; and the 2018 Webby Awards for news on social platforms.

In 2019, Williams joined VICE Media as senior producer to head talent for its new expanded television and digital programming.
