= George Ekins =

English footballer

Personal information
- Full name: Frederick George Ekins
- Date of birth: 9 September 1871
- Place of birth: Gillingham, Kent, England
- Date of death: 12 December 1960 (aged 89)
- Position: Winger

Youth career
- New Brompton Rovers
- Chatham

Senior career*
Years	Team	Apps	(Gls)
1891–1893	Derby County	18	(3)
1893–1895	Burton Swifts	52	(17)
1895–1899	Luton Town	65	(20)
- * Club domestic league appearances and goals

Frederick George Ekins (9 September 1871 – 1960) was an English footballer.

== Career ==
Ekins started his career with two local teams; first New Brompton Rovers, and then Chatham. In 1891 he joined Football League side Derby County, where he spent two years before moving to Burton Swifts. After two seasons with Burton, he was transferred to Luton Town, of the Southern League. Two years later, Luton Town were elected to the Football League, and Ekins spent two more seasons with them before retiring.
