= Thomas Coupar =

Scottish footballer

Personal information
- Full name: Thomas Coupar
- Date of birth: 1862
- Place of birth: Dundee, Scotland
- Date of death: Unknown
- Position: Forward

Senior career*
Years	Team	Apps	(Gls)
1888–1890	Bolton Wanderers	5	(1)
- * Club domestic league appearances and goals

Thomas Coupar (1862 – unknown) was a Scottish footballer who played in the Football League for Bolton Wanderers.

== 1888-1889 ==
Thomas Coupar made his League debut, and played at centre-forward, on 8 September 1888 at Pike's Lane, the then home of Bolton Wanderers. The opposition was Derby County. Bolton Wanderers lost the match 6–3. Thomas Coupar scored his debut and only League goal on 15 September 1888 at Pike's Lane, when the opposition were Burnley. Thomas Coupar scored the third of Bolton Wanderers three goals in the match. Bolton Wanderers lost 4–3. Thomas Coupar played in three of 22 League games played by Bolton Wanderers in season 1888–89. He scored one League goal. He also played as a forward in a front-line that scored three-League-goals-or-more in a match on two occasions.

== Later life and death ==
Information about Coupar's life after leaving Bolton Wanderers is unknown. No public records have been found confirming his post-football occupation, emigration, or family life. His date of death remains undocumented.
