= Tommy McCairns =

English footballer (1873–1932)

Personal information
- Full name: Thomas McCairns
- Date of birth: 22 December 1873
- Place of birth: Dinsdale, Darlington, England
- Date of death: 1932 (aged 58–59)
- Place of death: Willesden, England
- Height: 5 ft 8 in (1.73 m)
- Position: Centre forward

Senior career*
Years	Team	Apps	(Gls)
–	Middlesbrough Ironopolis		
–	Whitby		
1893–1898	Grimsby Town	137	(86)
1898–1899	Bristol Rovers		
1899	Notts County	4	(0)
1899–1901	Lincoln City	35	(14)
1901–1902	Barnsley	23	(9)
1902–1903	Wellingborough		
1903	Queens Park Rangers	1	(0)
1903–1904	Brighton & Hove Albion	17	(5)
1904–1905	Southern United		
–	Kettering		
- * Club domestic league appearances and goals

Thomas McCairns (22 December 1873 – 1932) was an English footballer who scored 109 goals from 199 appearances in the Football League playing for Grimsby Town, Notts County, Lincoln City and Barnsley. He also played for Middlesbrough Ironopolis, Whitby, in the Birmingham & District League and the Western League for Bristol Rovers, in the Southern League for Wellingborough, Queens Park Rangers, and Brighton & Hove Albion, in the South-Eastern League for Southern United, and for Kettering.
