= Matthew Mullen (Scottish footballer) =

Scottish footballer

Personal information
- Place of birth: Scotland
- Position: Forward

Senior career*
Years	Team	Apps	(Gls)
1891–1892	St Mirren		
1892–1893	Grimsby Town	16	(6)
1893–1894	St Mirren		
1894–189?	Dunblane		
- * Club domestic league appearances and goals

Matthew Mullen was a Scottish professional footballer who played as a forward.
