= Fairfield F.C. =

Fairfield
- Full name: Fairfield Football Club
- Nickname(s): the Reds
- Founded: 1886
- Dissolved: 1897
- Ground: Gransmoor Road, Greater Manchester
- Secretary: J. Lee
Home colours

Fairfield Football Club was an Association football team from Fairfield, now a suburb of Droylsden, Greater Manchester.

== History ==
The first reference to a Fairfield Football Club is of a rugby union side playing in 1874 there is also a Liverpool rugby side (formerly known as Crescent Wanderers) which played under the Fairfield name in the early 1880s. However the earliest record for the association club is from the 1886–87 season.

The club took a major step forward in 1892, by forming itself as a limited company - £500 was raised through the initial share subscription - and gaining election to the Lancashire League. Two 9th out of 12 positions followed. It required re-election in 1892–93; local rivals Gorton Villa sought to replace the club, but the other members kept faith with Fairfield. Villa folded as a consequence and some of its supporters switched to Fairfield.

The club suffered a tragedy before the 1894–95 season, as 26-year-old Joseph Hillrick Barr, one of the club's players, was killed at work, when he was entangled in a machine strap; the inquest returned a verdict of accidental death, thus exonerating his employer (Messrs Marchington finishing works). Fairfield finished the season in triumph, as it won the Lancashire League title for the only time, 3 points ahead of defending champions Blackpool. It celebrated the title with a 3–2 win at Manchester City before 4,000 spectators.

The season also provided Fairfield's greatest progression in the FA Cup, winning through the qualifying rounds to the first round proper. The club was however drawn away to Sunderland, the reigning Football League champions, who would retain their title that season. The foregone conclusion of the tie ensured a "beggarly" crowd of 2,000, paying £67. who saw the home side dominate in appalling conditions, going in at half-time 6–0 up and winning 11–1, Clark netting the consolation when eight down with a shot that was so hard that it rebounded back into the pitch from the back of the net.

At the end of the season the club made its first attempt at entry to the Football League, losing out to Loughborough, who replaced Walsall Town Swifts. The following season another failed attempt was made with only 3 votes received. This was however more than Tottenham Hotspur. The 1896–97 season resulted in a runners-up spot and the last attempt to gain entry to the Football League. The club failed again but did gain more votes than Crewe Alexandra and Millwall Athletic.

However the attempt to join the League was a last throw of the dice; the club struggled for gates, with locals preferring to go to Bank Lane or Hyde Road to watch the other Manchester clubs. The final gate for the club (for a 1–1 draw with South Shore, the club starting the match with only 8 players) amounted to £12, as against an average weekly wage bill of £14, and, on 9 October 1897, after the South Shore match, the directors agreed to close up shop. The club's Lancashire League record for the season (three draws and a defeat) was expunged.

== Colours ==
The club played in red shirts.

== Ground ==
The club moved to its permanent enclosed ground, behind the Gransmoor Hotel, in 1892; it had ambitious plans to turn it into a 20,000 capacity stadium.

== Notable players ==
- Tom Fitzsimmons, who scored the club's last-ever goal
- David Fitzsimmons, Tom's brother, who joined Chorley on the dissolution of Fairfield
- Bill Regan, who joined Sheffield Wednesday in 1896

== Sources ==
- Twydell, Dave (2001). Denied F.C. Yore Publications. pp. 80–81. ISBN 1-874427-98-4.
