= Billy Hood =

English footballer

Personal information
- Full name: William Hood
- Date of birth: Q1 1873
- Place of birth: Ashton-under-Lyne, England
- Date of death: December 1947 (aged 73–74)
- Position: Inside right

Senior career*
Years	Team	Apps	(Gls)
1891–1894	Newton Heath	48	(11)
- Stalybridge Rovers
- * Club domestic league appearances and goals

William Hood (born Q1 1873; December 1947) was an English footballer who usually played as an inside right, but was also often used as an outside forward or a wing half. Born in Ashton-under-Lyne, Lancashire, he played for Newton Heath, making his debut at left-half in a Football Alliance match at home to Lincoln City on 21 November 1891; Hood scored twice in a 10–1 win, the first time the club had scored 10 goals in a league match. Hood finished the season with five goals in 15 Alliance appearances as Newton Heath finished second behind Nottingham Forest and were subsequently elected to the Football League for the 1892–93 season.

He scored another five goals in 21 appearances in the club's inaugural season in the First Division, including one goal in their record 10–1 win over Wolverhampton Wanderers on 15 October 1892. That was one of only six Newton Heath victories that season (all at home) as they finished in last place and only avoided relegation to the Second Division thanks to victory over Small Heath in the post-season Test match; Hood missed the original match, which finished in a 1–1 draw, but returned to the side at right-half for the replay at Bramall Lane in Sheffield, which Newton Heath won 5–2.

In 1893–94, Hood managed just 12 appearances (including two at right-back) and one goal as Newton Heath again finished bottom of the First Division; this time they lost 2–0 to Liverpool in their Test match and were relegated to the Second Division. With that, Hood took the opportunity to leave the club, but he never played in the Football League again and later found himself playing for Stalybridge Rovers in the Lancashire League.

== Bibliography ==
- Dykes, Garth (1994). The United Alphabet: A Complete Who's Who of Manchester United F.C. Leicester: ACL & Polar Publishing. ISBN 0-9514862-6-8.
- Joyce, Michael (2004). Football League Players' Records 1888 to 1939. Nottingham: Tony Brown. ISBN 978-1-899468-67-6.
- Shury, Alan; Landamore, Brian (2005). The Definitive Newton Heath F.C. Nottingham: Tony Brown. ISBN 1-899468-16-1.
