= Arthur Worrall =

English footballer

Personal information
- Full name: Arthur John Worrall
- Date of birth: 8 September 1869
- Place of birth: Wolverhampton, England
- Position: Forward

Senior career*
Years	Team	Apps	(Gls)
1889–1890	Wolverhampton Wanderers	20	(7)
1892–1893	Burton Swifts	17	(13)
- Leicester Fosse
1893–1894	Woolwich Arsenal	4	(1)
- Nelson
- Stockport County
- Crewe Alexandra
1898–1899	Barnsley	7	(0)
- * Club domestic league appearances and goals

Arthur Worrall (born 8 September 1869) was an English footballer who played as a forward. Worrall featured for clubs such as Barnsley, Leicester Fosse, Wolverhampton Wanderers and Woolwich Arsenal.

== Career ==
Worrall was a forward who started his playing career with Goldthorne Villa. He then followed up with spells at Wolverhampton Wanderers, Burton Swifts, and Leicester Fosse. Worrall then moved to Woolwich Arsenal where he brought his playing career to a close.

At Leicester Fosse he played four games, scoring three goals. His career at Leicester was cut short due to injury, and then a suspension by the club for poor conduct, and he moved on to Arsenal. While playing for Arsenal, Worrall played in ten games in 32 days in front of the public.

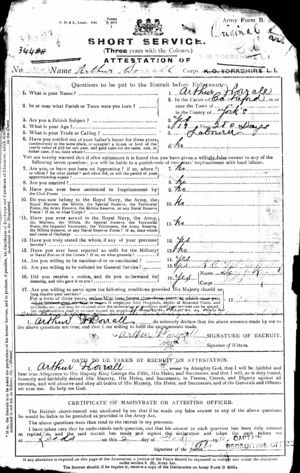
Arthur Worrall military service record

A surviving service record indicates Worrall served in the military.
