= Charlie Harrison (footballer, born 1861) =

English footballer

Personal information
- Full name: Charles Edwin Harrison
- Date of birth: Q3 1861
- Place of birth: Newton Heath, England
- Position: Goalkeeper

Senior career*
Years	Team	Apps	(Gls)
1886–1888	Newton Heath		
1888–1890	Bolton Wanderers	24	(0)
- * Club domestic league appearances and goals

Charles Edwin Harrison (born Q3 1861) was an English footballer who played in the Football League for Bolton Wanderers.

Charlie Harrison' first club was his local club, Newton Heath, at that time a non-League club based on railway works. He signed in 1886 and left Newton Heath after two seasons and joined Bolton Wanderers.

== 1888-1889 ==
Charlie Harrison, playing as goalkeeper, made his League and club debut on 8 September 1888, at Pike's Lane, the then home of Bolton Wanderers. The visitors were Derby County who won the match 6–3. Charlie Harrison appeared in 19 of the 22 League matches Bolton Wanderers played in season 1888–89. Charlie Harrison, as goalkeeper, was part of a Bolton Wanderers defence that kept one clean sheet and kept the opposition to one League goal in a match on four occasions.

The following year, 1889, Charlie Harrison played only five more League matches for Bolton Wanderers and then he left and returned to Newton Heath. He played 24 League matches for Bolton Wanderers in total. Newton Heath, when Harrison returned, were now members of the new formed Football Alliance League. Newton Heath finished eighth in that first season, 1889–1890. It is not recorded when Harrison retired or, when he died.
