= Jack Chadburn =

English footballer

Personal information
- Full name: John Chadburn
- Date of birth: 12 February 1873
- Place of birth: Mansfield, England
- Date of death: December 1923 (aged 50)
- Positions: Full back; outside forward

Youth career
- Mansfield & District Schools

Senior career*
Years	Team	Apps	(Gls)
- Leicester Fosse
- Mansfield Unitarians
- Mansfield Greenhalgh's
1892–1894	Lincoln City	25	(9)
1894–1897	Notts County	50	(15)
1897–1900	Wolverhampton Wanderers	11	(1)
1900–1903	West Bromwich Albion	43	(3)
1903–1904	Liverpool	2	(0)
1904–1905	Plymouth Argyle	15	(1)
	Swindon Town	0	(0)
–	Mansfield Mechanics		
- Woodhouse Rangers
- * Club domestic league appearances and goals

John Chadburn (12 February 1873 – December 1923) was an English footballer who played in the Football League for Lincoln City, Notts County, Wolverhampton Wanderers, West Bromwich Albion and Liverpool. He also played in the Southern League for Plymouth Argyle. Born in Mansfield, Chadburn could play as a full back and an outside forward.

== Career ==
Chadburn joined English Football League side Lincoln City in 1892. He made his first team debut on 7 September 1893 in a 1–1 draw against Rotherham Town. He scored 10 times during the season in 27 appearances in total. This earned him a move to First Division Notts County where he remained for three seasons.

He joined Wolverhampton Wanderers in October 1897, making his club debut on 27 November 1897 in a 2–1 win at Preston North End. Chadburn was unable to hold down a regular first team place at Molineux, and made just 12 appearances in total over two seasons.

He moved to their Black Country rivals West Bromwich Albion in January 1900. Here, he helped the club win promotion as champions back to the top flight in the 1901–02 campaign.

Liverpool signed him during the summer of 1903 but he only managed two first team appearances for the Merseyside club, the opening fixtures of the 1903–04 season. He joined Southern League side Plymouth Argyle towards the end of the campaign, their first as a professional club, and made his debut in March 1904. He appeared sporadically for the first team, scoring one goal in 15 appearances, before being released at the end of the 1904–05 season. He had a brief spell with Swindon Town and went on to play for Mansfield Mechanics and Woodhouse Rangers before retiring from competitive football in 1909.
