= Hervey Robinson =

English footballer

Personal information
- Full name: Herve Josse Robinson
- Date of birth: 1874
- Place of birth: Grimsby, England
- Date of death: 24 January 1954 (aged 79–80)
- Position: Inside forward

Senior career*
Years	Team	Apps	(Gls)
1892–1893	Grimsby All Saints		
1893–1899	Grimsby Town	2	(4)
- * Club domestic league appearances and goals

Herve Josse "Hervey" Robinson (1874 – 24 January 1954) was an English professional footballer who played as an inside forward.
