= Kenny Davenport =

English footballer (1862–1908)

Personal information
- Full name: James Kenyon Davenport
- Date of birth: 23 March 1862
- Place of birth: Bolton, England
- Date of death: 27 September 1908 (aged 46)
- Place of death: Bolton, England
- Position: Inside right

Senior career*
Years	Team	Apps	(Gls)
–1883	Gilnow Rangers		
1883–1893	Bolton Wanderers	56	(25)
1893	Southport Central		

International career
1885–1890	England	2	(0)
- * Club domestic league appearances and goals

James Kenyon "Kenny" Davenport (23 March 1862 – 27 September 1908) was an English international footballer who played as an inside right.

== Career ==
Born in the Deane area of Bolton, Davenport played for Bolton Wanderers, after joining them from local side Gilnow Rangers in 1883. He later played for Southport, and was capped twice by England, in 1885 and 1890. He retired from professional football in 1893, and returned to Bolton Wanderers to coach their reserve team.

Davenport was the scorer of the first Football League goal, scored at 3:47pm on 8 September 1888 against Derby County. Until 2013, it had been thought that the first goal had been an own goal by Aston Villa full-back Gershom Cox.

Davenport made his League debut on 8 September 1888, playing as a winger, at Pike's Lane, then home of Bolton Wanderers. The opposition were Derby County and Bolton lost 6–3, Davenport scoring the first and second of Bolton's three goals. In season 1888–89 Davenport appeared in all 22 League games played by Bolton and scored 11 goals. He was one of five Bolton players who played in every (22) League game; the other four were, James Brogan, John Milne, Bob Roberts and Davie Weir. Davenport's 11 League goals included one League hat-trick and he scored two-League-goals-in-a-match twice. Davenport twice played centre-half in a defence-line that kept the opposition to one-League-goal-in-a-match once. He also played as a forward 19 times in a front-line that scored three-League-goals-or-more in a match on nine occasions.

On 22 November 2016 a plaque was unveiled in Bolton that commemorates Davenport's achievement in scoring the first League goal.
