= Edwin Ross Williams =

Edwin Ross Williams (born 1942) is a physicist at the National Institute of Standards and Technology. He received a B.A. from Nebraska Wesleyan University in 1964, an M.S. in physics from University of Colorado Boulder in 1966, and a Ph.D. from Wesleyan University in 1970.

Williams was awarded the status of fellow in the American Physical Society in 1994, after being nominated by the Topical Group on Instrument and Measurement Science for "excellence in measurement research leading to an upper limit or the rest mass of the photon and precision determination of the gyromagnetic ratio of the proton and of the fine-structure constant, and for leadership in highly accurate realizations of the base electrical units, the ampere, volt, ohm, and farad."

== See also ==
- List of fellows of the American Physical Society (1972–1997)
