= Tommy Fitzsimmons =

Scottish footballer

Thomas Fitzsimmons (15 June 1872 – 1934) was a Scottish footballer. His regular position was as a forward. He was born in Annbank, Ayrshire. He played for Annbank (featuring for the village team at various between spells at other clubs), Celtic (playing a single trial match in the Scottish Football League – against Rangers), St Mirren, Glossop North End, Fairfield Athletic, Oldham County, Wigan County and two spells at Manchester United (then known as Newton Heath). His younger brother David, a half back, also played for Newton Heath, Fairfield and Wigan.

In 2021, his medal from the 1893 Manchester Senior Cup, believed to be the oldest such item relating to Manchester United to have been offered for sale, was auctioned for £24,000.
