= Walter Adams (footballer) =

English footballer

Personal information
- Full name: Walter Adams
- Place of birth: England
- Position: Winger

Senior career*
Years	Team	Apps	(Gls)
1893–1894	Middlesbrough Ironopolis	23	(6)
- * Club domestic league appearances and goals

Walter Adams was an English professional footballer who played as a winger. He played in the Football League for Middlesbrough Ironopolis.
