= James Cairns (footballer) =

English footballer

Personal information
- Full name: James Cairns
- Positions: Left back; right half

Senior career*
Years	Team	Apps	(Gls)
1892–1894	Ardwick	1	(0)
1894–1895	Newton Heath	1	(0)
- * Club domestic league appearances and goals

James Cairns was a footballer, who played as a full back or wing half for Ardwick and Newton Heath.

Cairns began his football career with Ardwick towards the end of their last season before joining the Football League, in March 1892. However, it was more than 18 months before he made his debut for Ardwick, playing at right half in a 3–2 home defeat to Newcastle United on 21 October 1893. That match turned out to be Cairns' only appearance for the club, and he joined Newton Heath in September 1894. Again, Cairns had a substantial wait before his debut for the Heathens, finally playing at left full back in a 2–1 defeat away to Bury on 15 April 1895. This was to be his only appearance for Newton Heath, and he left football at the end of the season.
