= Felix Mooney =

English footballer

Personal information
- Full name: Felix Mooney
- Date of birth: 1868
- Place of birth: Chester-le-Street, England
- Position: Inside forward

Senior career*
Years	Team	Apps	(Gls)
1891–1892	Bootle		
1892–1893	Ardwick	9	(4)
1895–1896	Bury	7	(2)
1896–1897	Walsall	0	(0)
1897–1900	Wellington Town		
1900–1902	Shrewsbury Town		
1902	Ironbridge		
Total		16	(6)
- * Club domestic league appearances and goals

Felix Mooney (1868–unknown) was an English footballer who played in the Football League for Ardwick and Bury.
