= James Hendry (footballer) =

Scottish footballer

James Hendry was a Scottish footballer who played as a forward. He played for Alloa Athletic and Manchester United.
