= Tom Haydock (English footballer) =

English footballer

Personal information
- Full name: Tom Haydock
- Position: Defender

Senior career*
Years	Team	Apps	(Gls)
1888–1889	Bolton Wanderers	2	(0)
1890	Ardwick		
- * Club domestic league appearances and goals

Thomas Haydock, known as Tom Haydock, was an English footballer who played in The Football League for Bolton Wanderers. Tom Haydock did not make his League debut until season 2, 1889–1890. However, Haydock was selected by Wanderers to play right-back in their 3 FA Cup ties in 1888–1889 season. In the first 2 ties against Hurst and West Manchester Haydock was part of a solid defence that kept clean-sheets. However, on 17-Nov-1888 Haydock and his team were well beaten by Irish club, Linfield Athletic. The final score was 4–0 to Linfield.
