= James Brogan (footballer, born 1865) =

Scottish footballer

Personal information
- Full name: James Brogan
- Date of birth: 17 June 1864
- Place of birth: Beith, Scotland
- Date of death: 1951
- Position: Forward

Youth career
- 1882-1883: Beith
- 1883-1884: Hibernian
- 1884-1885: Hearts

Senior career*
Years	Team	Apps	(Gls)
1885-1888	Hearts	0	(0)
1888–1892	Bolton Wanderers	74	(26)
1892	Fleetwood Rangers	0	(0)
- * Club domestic league appearances and goals

James Brogan (June 17, 1864 – 1951) was a Scottish footballer who played for the majority of his career at Bolton Wanderers. He played mostly as an inside-left or outside-left.

Having started his career in the amateur game with his local club Beith, he signed for Hibernian in 1883. He scored six goals on his senior debut for the club, in a 10–1 Scottish Cup win against Edina. He was then signed by Hibernian's Edinburgh derby rivals Hearts.

Brogan then moved to Bolton Wanderers from Hearts, after the Scottish club had toured Lancashire.

== 1888-1889 ==
When signing for Bolton in December 1884, James Brogan became one of the first professional footballers to play for Bolton Wanderers. James Brogan made his League debut, playing as a winger, on 8 September 1888 at Pike's Lane, then home of Bolton Wanderers, and their opponents were Derby County. Bolton Wanderers lost the match 6–3. James Brogan scored his debut League goal, scoring Bolton Wanderers third goal of the match. When James Brogan made his League debut he was approximately 23 years 70 days old; that made him, on that first day of League football, Bolton Wanderers' youngest player. Brogan played in all 22 League matches in season 1888-89 scoring 13 goals (Bolton Wanderers top scorer for the season), scoring two-League-goals-in-a-match twice. Brogan played as a winger in a midfield that achieved big (three-League-goals-or-more) wins on five occasions. James Brogan was one of five Bolton Wanderers players, who, in season 1888–89 played in every (22) League game. The other four, apart from Brogan, were, Kenny Davenport, John Milne, Bob Roberts and Davie Weir.

== 1892 ==
When Brogan lost his place in the Bolton team in 1892, he left football and went to work in the shipyards, eventually retiring at the age of 85.
