= John Milne (English footballer) =

English footballer

Personal information
- Position: Forward

Senior career*
Years	Team	Apps	(Gls)
1888–1890	Bolton Wanderers	39	(9)
1890–1894	Ardwick	18	(3)
- * Club domestic league appearances and goals

John Milne was an English footballer who played in the Football League for Ardwick and Bolton Wanderers.

== John Milne ==
Very little is known about this footballer of the Victorian era. John Milne made his League and, possibly, Club debut on 8 September 1888, as a forward, at Pike's Lane, then home of Bolton Wanderers. The opposition was Derby County and Bolton Wanderers lost the match 6–3. John Milne scored his debut League goal on 29 September 1888 at Pike's Lane when Everton were the visitors. Bolton Wanderers won the match 6–2 and John Milne scored the fourth and sixth goals of Bolton Wanderers six. John Milne played all 22 League games in season 1888–89 and scored six League goals. John Milne was one of five Bolton Wanderers players, who, in season 1888–89 played in every (22) League game. The other four, apart from Milne, were, James Brogan, Kenny Davenport, Bob Roberts and Davie Weir. John Milne as a centre-half (five appearances) was part of a Bolton Wanderers defence that kept one clean-sheet. John Milne also played as a forward (17 appearances) in a Bolton Wanderers front-line that scored three-League-goals-or-more in a match on seven occasions. In scoring six League goals John Milne scored two-League-goals-in-a-match once.
