= Dave Riddoch =

Scottish footballer

Personal information
- Full name: David Riddoch
- Date of birth: 1864
- Place of birth: Edinburgh, Scotland
- Date of death: September 1926 (aged 61–62)
- Place of death: Cleethorpes, England
- Position: Winger

Senior career*
Years	Team	Apps	(Gls)
1881–1882	Edina		
1882–1885	Heart of Midlothian		
1885–1886	St Bernard's		
1886–1887	Berwick Rangers		
1887–1895	Grimsby Town	59	(18)
- * Club domestic league appearances and goals

David Riddoch (1864 – September 1926) was a Scottish professional footballer who played as a winger. He drowned himself in 1926.
