= John Wade (footballer) =

English footballer (1871–1937)

Personal information
- Full name: John James Wade
- Date of birth: 7 June 1871
- Place of birth: Blackburn, England
- Date of death: 1937 (aged 65–66)
- Position: Winger

Senior career*
Years	Team	Apps	(Gls)
1891–1894	Darwen	47	(12)
1894–1895	Blackburn Rovers	1	(2)
1896–1897	Darwen	2	(1)
Total		50	(15)
- * Club domestic league appearances and goals

John James Wade (7 June 1871 – 1937) was an English footballer who played in the Football League for Blackburn Rovers and Darwen.
