= Walter Rushton =

English footballer

Personal information
- Position: Winger

Senior career*
Years	Team	Apps	(Gls)
1885	Blackburn Rovers		
1888–1890	Bolton Wanderers	2	(0)
1890	Ardwick		
- * Club domestic league appearances and goals

Walter Rushton was an English footballer who played in the Football League for Bolton Wanderers.

== Early career ==
Walter Rushton signed for Blackburn Rovers in 1885 for the 1885-1886 Season. The club had already won the Cup twice from 1883 to 1885 and became the last club to complete a FA Cup hat-trick (three in a row). Rushton did not play in the Final. It is unknown if he played in the earlier rounds. He left Blackburn in 1888 and joined Bolton Wanderers.

Walter Rushton did not make his League debut until season 2, 1889–1890. However, Rushton was selected by Wanderers to play outside-right in their 3 FA Cup ties in 1888–1889 season. In the first 2 ties against Hurst and West Manchester Rushton was part of a forward line unable to score. both matches ended 0-0. However, on 17-Nov-1888 Rushton and his team were well beaten by Irish club, Linfield Athletic. The final score was 4–0 to Linfield.

In October 1890, Walter played his only game for Ardwick in a 12-0 win in the first qualifying round of the FA Cup against Liverpool Stanley, scoring one of the goals.
