= Jimmy Coupar =

Scottish footballer

Jimmy Coupar (3 March 1869 – January 1953) was a Scottish footballer. His regular position was as a forward. He was born in Dundee. He played for Dundee Our Boys, St Johnstone, Rotherham Town, Luton Town, Swindon Town, Linfield, and Manchester United.
