= Fairfield Athletic F.C. =

Fairfield Athletic F.C. may refer to one of these association football (soccer) clubs:

- Fairfield F.C., English club from Manchester
- Fairfield F.C. (Scotland), Scottish club from Glasgow
