= William McKennie =

Scottish footballer

Personal information
- Full name: William McKennie
- Date of birth: 1868
- Place of birth: Renton, Scotland
- Date of death: 1902 (aged 34)
- Position: Winger

Senior career*
Years	Team	Apps	(Gls)
1890–1891	Preston North End	11	(2)
1892–1894	Darwen	70	(21)
- * Club domestic league appearances and goals

William McKennie (1868–1902) was a Scottish footballer who played in the Football League for Darwen and Preston North End.
