= Edwin Williams (footballer) =

Welsh footballer

Personal information
- Full name: Edwin Houghland Williams
- Date of birth: 5 November 1868
- Place of birth: Hawarden, Wales
- Date of death: 14 May 1950 (aged 81)
- Place of death: Nantwich, Cheshire

Senior career*
Years	Team	Apps	(Gls)
- Crewe Alexandra

International career
1893	Wales	2	(0)
- * Club domestic league appearances and goals

Edwin H. Williams (born 1868) was a Welsh international footballer. He was part of the Wales national football team, playing 2 matches. He played his first match on 13 March 1893 against England and his last match on 18 March 1893 against Scotland. At club level, he played for Saltney Victoria (1887/88), Over Wanderers (1888/89), Chester (1889/90) and Crewe Alexandra (1889–1893). He also turned out for Nantwich (1892/93), later becoming the local reporter for 'The Nantwich Chronicle' for over half a century.

== See also ==
- List of Wales international footballers (alphabetical)
