= E. Siddons =

English footballer

Personal information
- Position: Defender

Senior career*
Years	Team	Apps	(Gls)
1888–1889	Bolton Wanderers	1	(0)
- * Club domestic league appearances and goals

E. Siddons was an English footballer who played in The Football League for Bolton Wanderers, in the late 19th century.

Siddons played his one League match in the 3rd month of the inaugural Football League season of 1888–1889, November 1888. His debut and only top-flight game was on 5 November 1888, at Stoney Lane, West Bromwich, then home of West Bromwich Albion. He played at left-back in place of Bob Roberts, who was moved to right-half. The 1st half was close. Both teams had opportunities to score but Wanderers got the lead just before half-time. Wanderers dominated the 2nd half and were 5–1 up with 2 minutes left to play. However, Siddons struck Albion forward, Billy Hendry with his fist which caused a fight. Some of the crowd came onto the pitch and joined in. The referee and club officials were able to restore order without using the local Police service. The match was ended and Wanderers were given the win. Siddons was suspended by the Football Association for a month and never played top flight football again. Bolton finished the season in 5th place.
