= Davie Weir (footballer) =

English footballer

Personal information
- Full name: David Weir
- Date of birth: 29 August 1863
- Place of birth: Aldershot, England
- Date of death: 1 December 1933 (aged 70)
- Place of death: Bolton, England
- Height: 1.74 m (5 ft 9 in)

Senior career*
Years	Team	Apps	(Gls)
- Hampton
1885–1886	Maybole		
1886–1887	Thistle		
1887–1888	Halliwell		
1888–1890	Bolton Wanderers	43	(21)
1890–1892	Ardwick	14	(8)
1892–1895	Bolton Wanderers	43	(10)
- Maybole
Total		100	(39)

International career
1889	England	2	(0)

Managerial career
- 1909–1911: Glossop
- 1911: Stuttgarter Kickers
- * Club domestic league appearances and goals

David Weir (29 August 1863 – 1 December 1933) was an English footballer who played for several clubs in the 19th century, including Bolton Wanderers and Ardwick (Manchester City), and won two caps for England.

== Playing career ==
=== Club career ===
In the infancy of professional football, Weir played for a number of teams, and he learned his footballing skills at Hampton, Thistle, Maybole and Halliwell. He then signed for Bolton Wanderers in June 1888. Davie Weir made his Club & League debut on 8 September 1888, as a centre-half, at Pike's Lane, then home of Bolton Wanderers. The opposition was Derby County who won the match 6–3. Davie Weir scored his debut League goal on 22 September 1888, playing at centre-half, at Deepdale, the home of Preston North End. The home side won 3–1 and Davie Weir scored Bolton Wanderers solitary goal. Davie Weir played in all 22 League games played by Bolton Wanderers in season 1888–89. Davie Weir was one of five Bolton Wanderers players, who, in season 1888–89 played in every (22) League game. The other four, apart from Weir, were, James Brogan, Kenny Davenport, John Milne and Bob Roberts. Davie Weir scored two League goals, both in the same match. As a centre-half (six appearances) Davie Weir played in a Bolton Wanderers defence that conceded one-League-goal-in-a-match once. As a wing-half/winger (eight appearances) he played in a Bolton Wanderers midfield that achieved big (three-League-goals-or-more) wins by on two occasions. As a forward (eight appearances) he played in a Bolton Wanderers front-line that scored three-League-goals-or-more on three occasions.

Weir played in a number of positions. In his first spell at Bolton he was renowned for his ability as a centre-half, yet scored 31 times in two seasons. In an FA Cup tie against Sheffield United on 1 February 1890, Weir scored four goals in a 13–0 rout, with a further five goals coming from Jim Cassidy.

In May 1890 he joined Ardwick, the predecessor of Manchester City. The transfer was viewed as an unusual move as Ardwick were not a League club at that time, and did not join the Football Alliance until 1891. At Ardwick, Weir played primarily as a forward. On 4 October 1890, he scored the club's first ever FA Cup goal, part of a hat-trick. Retaining the services of a player with the standing of Weir was costly for a fledgling club such as Ardwick; in the 1891–92 season the club hosted a benefit match against a representative team of internationals to raise money for him.

In 1892, Ardwick joined the Football League as founder members of the Second Division. Weir was the club's top goalscorer in their first League season, scoring eight goals in 14 appearances. In January 1893, he returned to Bolton Wanderers where he made a further 45 appearances over three seasons.

=== International career ===
His performances for Bolton resulted in international recognition; he made his England debut on 2 March 1889, a 6–1 win against Ireland. He gained a second cap a month later in a 3–2 defeat to Scotland. Some observers credited him with England's second goal, which was officially recorded as a Billy Bassett goal.

== Managerial career ==
After his playing career, Weir had a brief period in football management, managing Glossop between 1909 and 1911.
