= Adam Carson (footballer) =

Scottish footballer

Adam Carson (unknown - 1935) was a Scottish footballer who played as a forward. He played for Glasgow Thistle, Newton Heath, Ardwick and Liverpool during the 1890s. At representative level, he played once for the Scottish Football Alliance XI against the rival Scottish Football League in 1892.

Adam played for Ardwick A.F.C. (later Manchester City) in the Second Division during seasons 1892-93 (3 app.s, 1 goal) and 1893-94 (6 app.s, 2 goals).
