= Pike's Lane =

Football ground in Bolton, England

- Interactive map of Pike's Lane
- Location: Bolton, England
- Coordinates: 53.5704°N 2.4499°W
- Surface: Grass
- Record attendance: 20,000

Construction
- Opened: 1880
- Closed: 1895

Tenant
- Bolton Wanderers

Pike's Lane was a football ground in Bolton, England. It was the home ground of Bolton Wanderers between 1880 and 1895, and the venue of the first goal scored in league football anywhere in the world.

== History ==
Pike's Lane opened in 1880, with the first match played against Great Lever on 10 September. The ground initially had embankments on both sides of the pitch, and later developments included a grandstand on the northern touchline and wooden terracing behind the eastern goal.

Bolton were founder members of the Football League in 1888, the world's first association football league. The first League match was played at Pike's Lane on 8 September 1888, with Bolton losing 6–3 to Derby County in front of 5,000 spectators. Bolton's Kenny Davenport scored the first goal after two minutes, the first goal scored in the Football League. The first Football League hat-trick was also scored at Pike's Lane a week later by Burnley's William Tait in a match that Burnley won 4–3.

The ground's record attendance of 20,000 was set for an FA Cup third round match against Liverpool on 24 February 1894. The highest attendance for a League match was 14,000 for a game against Blackburn Rovers on 28 March 1891. Pike's Lane hosted the first "inter-league" match between The Football League XI and the Scottish Football League XI, in April 1892.

At the end of the 1894–95 season the club moved to Burnden Park. Pike's Lane was unpopular with players and supporters due to a poor pitch and inadequate spectator facilities. The last match at the ground was played on 13 April 1895, as Bolton beat West Bromwich Albion 5–0 with 10,200 spectators in attendance. The site was later used to build terraced housing.
