= Joe Kinloch =

English footballer

Joseph Kinloch
Personal information
- Position: Forward

Senior career*
Years	Team	Apps	(Gls)
- Manchester United
- * Club domestic league appearances and goals

Joseph Kinloch was an English footballer. His regular position was as a forward. He was born in Blackburn. He played for Manchester United.
