= Ernest Street =

English footballer

Ernest Street (born 1878) was an English footballer. His regular position was as a forward. He was born in Altrincham, Cheshire. He played for Manchester United and Sale Homefield.
