= List of Manchester United F.C. seasons =

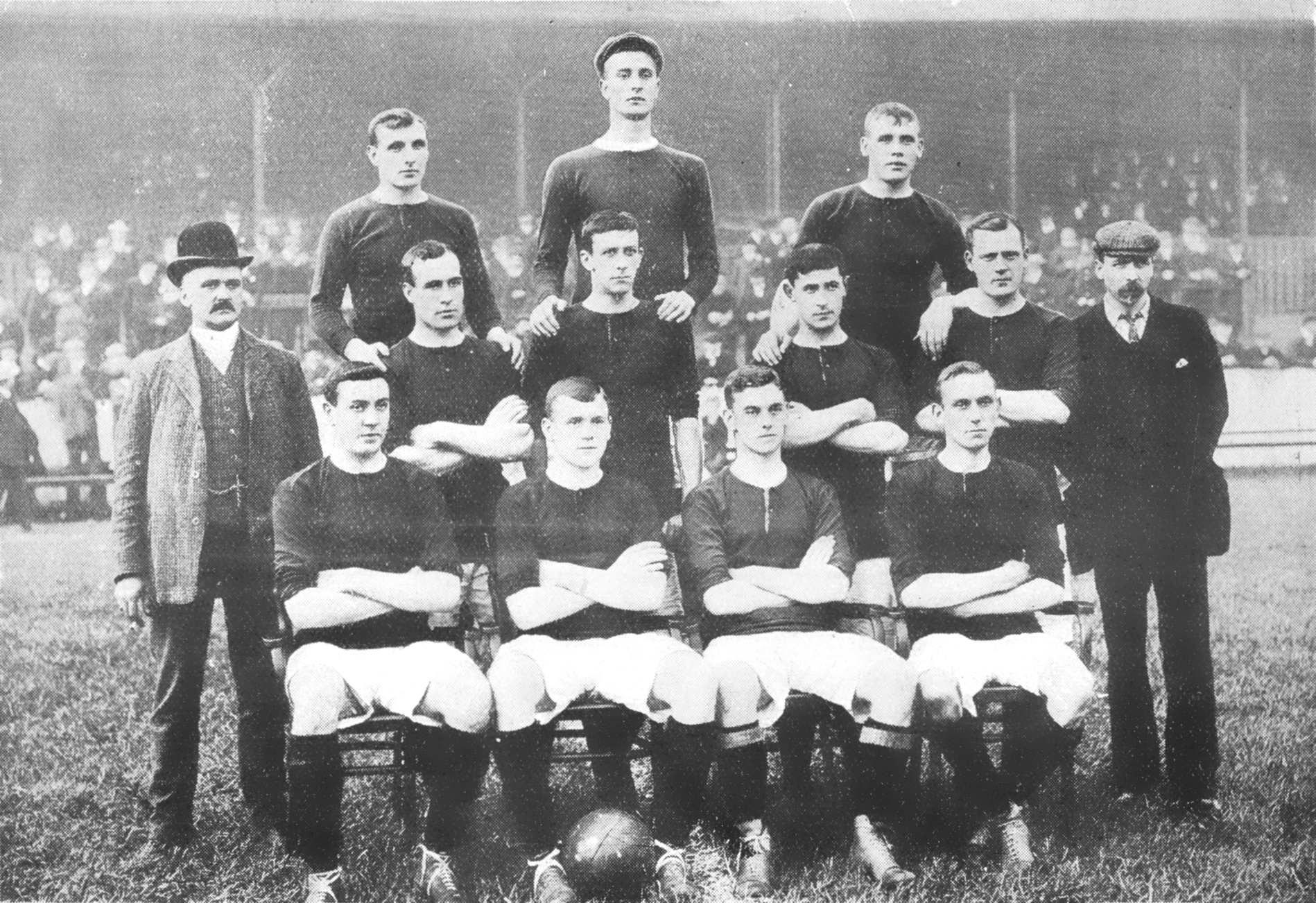
The Manchester United team at the start of the 1905–06 season, in which they were runners-up in the Second Division and were promoted.

Manchester United Football Club is an English professional football club based in Old Trafford, Greater Manchester. The club was formed in Newton Heath in 1878 as Newton Heath LYR F.C., and played their first competitive match in October 1886, when they entered the First Round of the 1886–87 FA Cup. The club was renamed Manchester United F.C. in 1902, and moved to Old Trafford in 1910.

The club has won a total of 68 major trophies: the League Championship a joint-record twenty times (seven times in the Football League era and a record thirteen times in the Premier League era), the FA Cup thirteen times, the League Cup six times, the Community Shield a record 21 times (including four shared titles), the European Cup three times, the UEFA Europa League once, the European Cup Winners' Cup once, the European Super Cup once, the Intercontinental Cup once and the FIFA Club World Cup once. The club has also never been out of the top two divisions of English football since entering the Football League. As of the end of the 2025–26 season, the club has played a total of 6,041 competitive matches, and has competed in the top flight for 101 of their 127 seasons.

This list details the club's achievements in major competitions, and the top scorers for each season. Top scorers in bold were also the top scorers in the English league that season. Records of competitions such as the Lancashire Cup and the Manchester and District Challenge Cup are not included due to them being considered of less importance than the FA Cup and the League Cup.

== History ==
The club formed in 1878 as Newton Heath LYR F.C. At this time organised League football did not exist; "first class matches" were arranged on a largely ad-hoc basis and supplemented by cup competitions. Official records from these matches are sketchy at best, and are often extrapolated from newspaper reports at the time. In 1886, the club entered the FA Cup for the first time, but were knocked out in the first round. They entered The Combination in 1888, but the league was wound up before the season could be completed. The club then joined the Football Alliance in 1889, and in 1892 were elected to the newly formed Football League First Division. Upon joining the Football League, the club dropped the "LYR" from their name, before financial troubles forced the club to restructure in 1902, including a change of name to Manchester United F.C.

In 1956–57, Manchester United became the first English club to enter European competition, entering the European Cup, following the Football Association's refusal to allow Chelsea to enter the previous year. Eleven years later, in 1968, they became the first English club to win the European Cup, and only the second British side after Celtic had won it the year before. Meanwhile, in 1960–61, Manchester United entered the inaugural Football League Cup, only to decline to enter for the next five years. In 1992–93, they became founder members and inaugural champions of the Premier League, and, in 1998–99, they won an unprecedented Treble of the Premier League, FA Cup and UEFA Champions League. This was followed by two more Premier League titles in 1999–2000 and 2000–01, making Manchester United only the fourth club to win three consecutive English league titles. The club picked up their 10th Premier League title in the 2007–08 season, and followed it with a third Champions League title 10 days later. The following season, Manchester United became the first British club to win the FIFA Club World Cup, before becoming the first English club to claim three consecutive league titles twice. In 2010–11, Manchester United won their 19th top division title, passing Liverpool's previous record of 18, before winning a 20th title in 2012–13. In 2016–17, Manchester United won their first UEFA Europa League trophy, making them only the fifth club to win the three main European club competitions.

== Key ==
- Pld = Matches played
- W = Matches won
- D = Matches drawn
- L = Matches lost
- GF = Goals for
- GA = Goals against
- Pts = Points
- Pos = Final position
- Alliance = Football Alliance
- Combination = The Combination
- Div 1 = Football League First Division
- Div 2 = Football League Second Division
- Prem = Premier League
- F = Final
- Group = Group stage
- QF = Quarter-finals
- QR1 = First qualifying round
- QR2 = Second qualifying round
- QR3 = Third qualifying round
- QR4 = Fourth qualifying round
- RInt = Intermediate round
- R1 = Round 1
- R2 = Round 2
- R3 = Round 3
- R4 = Round 4
- R5 = Round 5
- R6 = Round 6
- SF = Semi-finals

Winners	Runners-up	Promoted	Relegated

== Seasons ==
Results of league and cup competitions by season
Season	League										FA Cup	EFL Cup	Community Shield	UEFA FIFA	Top goalscorer(s) (Note: Goals in all competitions (Football League or Premier League, FA Cup, EFL Cup, European and FA Community Shield) are counted.)	
Season	Division	Tier	Pld	W	D	L	GF	GA	Pts	Pos	FA Cup	EFL Cup	Community Shield	UEFA FIFA	Player(s)	Goals
1886–87 (Note: The club did not start playing league football until 1888.)	—		—	—	—	—	—	—	—	—	R1	N/A (Note: The Football League Cup, later renamed the EFL Cup was first contested in 1960–61.)	N/A (Note: The Charity Shield, later renamed the FA Community Shield, was first held in 1908.)	N/A (Note: UEFA club competitions were first contested in 1955–56.)	Jack Doughty	4
1888–89 (Note: The 1888–89 season was cut short for Newton Heath, as the Combination was wound up in April 1889, and so the team was unable to complete its programme of 16 matches. However, records show that the club had the best record of all the teams in the league at that point.)	Combination		12	8	2	2	27	13	18	—	—	N/A	N/A	N/A	Jack Doughty Roger Doughty	6
1889–90	Alliance		22	9	2	11	40	45	20	8th	R1	N/A	N/A	N/A	Willie Stewart	10
1890–91	Alliance		22	7	3	12	37	55	17	9th	QR2	N/A	N/A	N/A	Bob Ramsay	7
1891–92	Alliance		22	12	7	3	69	33	31	2nd (Note: In 1892, the Football Alliance and the Football League decided to merge. Due to their second place finish in the 1891–92 Football Alliance, Newton Heath were elected to the Football League First Division for the following season.)	QR4	N/A	N/A	N/A	Bob Donaldson Alf Farman	20
1892–93	Div 1	1	30	6	6	18	50	85	18	16th (Note: Formal promotion and relegation had not yet been established, and so the bottom team in the Football League First Division would play a so-called "Test match" against the top team in the Second Division, Small Heath. Newton Heath drew the original Test match 1–1, then won the replay 5–2, and retained their place in the First Division.)	R1	N/A	N/A	N/A	Bob Donaldson	16
1893–94	Div 1 ↓	1	30	6	2	22	36	72	14	16th (Note: Formal promotion and relegation had still not been introduced, and so another Test match was played between Newton Heath and Liverpool, the winners of the Second Division. Newton Heath lost, and were relegated.)	R2	N/A	N/A	N/A	Bob Donaldson	10
1894–95	Div 2	2	30	15	8	7	78	44	38	3rd (Note: As a reward for finishing in 3rd place, Newton Heath played yet another Test match against the team that finished third from bottom in the First Division, Stoke City. They lost, and remained in the Second Division.)	R1	N/A	N/A	N/A	Dick Smith	20
1895–96	Div 2	2	30	15	3	12	66	57	33	6th	R2	N/A	N/A	N/A	Joe Cassidy	16
1896–97	Div 2	2	30	17	5	8	56	34	39	2nd (Note: For finishing in 2nd place, Newton Heath had to play Test matches against Burnley and Sunderland in order to gain promotion to Division One. They beat Burnley over two legs, but lost to Sunderland and remained in Division Two.)	R3	N/A	N/A	N/A	Joe Cassidy	25
1897–98	Div 2	2	30	16	6	8	64	35	38	4th	R2	N/A	N/A	N/A	Henry Boyd	22
1898–99	Div 2	2	34	19	5	10	67	43	43	4th	R1	N/A	N/A	N/A	Joe Cassidy	20
1899–1900	Div 2	2	34	20	4	10	63	27	44	4th	QR3	N/A	N/A	N/A	Joe Cassidy	16
1900–01	Div 2	2	34	14	4	16	42	38	32	10th	R1	N/A	N/A	N/A	Tommy Leigh	14
1901–02	Div 2	2	34	11	6	17	38	53	28	15th	RInt	N/A	N/A	N/A	Stephen Preston	11
1902–03	Div 2	2	34	15	8	11	53	38	38	5th	R2	N/A	N/A	N/A	Jack Peddie	15
1903–04	Div 2	2	34	20	8	6	65	33	48	3rd	R2	N/A	N/A	N/A	Tommy Arkesden	15
1904–05	Div 2	2	34	24	5	5	81	30	53	3rd	RInt	N/A	N/A	N/A	Jack Peddie	17
1905–06	Div 2 ↑	2	38	28	6	4	90	28	62	2nd	R4	N/A	N/A	N/A	Jack Picken	25
1906–07	Div 1	1	38	17	8	13	53	56	42	8th	R1	N/A	N/A	N/A	George Wall	13
1907–08	Div 1	1	38	23	6	9	81	48	52	**1st**	R4	N/A	**Winners**	N/A	Sandy Turnbull	27
1908–09	Div 1	1	38	15	7	16	58	68	37	13th	**Winners**	N/A		N/A	Jimmy Turnbull	22
1909–10	Div 1	1	38	19	7	12	69	61	45	5th	R1	N/A		N/A	George Wall	14
1910–11	Div 1	1	38	22	8	8	72	40	52	**1st**	R3	N/A		N/A	Enoch West	20
1911–12	Div 1	1	38	13	11	14	45	60	37	13th	R4	N/A	**Winners**	N/A	Enoch West	23
1912–13	Div 1	1	38	19	8	11	69	43	46	4th	R3	N/A		N/A	Enoch West	22
1913–14	Div 1	1	38	15	6	17	52	62	36	14th	R1	N/A	Not eligible	N/A	George Anderson	15
1914–15	Div 1	1	38	9	12	17	46	62	30	18th	R1	N/A		N/A	George Anderson	10
1915–19 (Note: No competitive football was played between 1915 and 1919 due to the First World War.)	—	1	—	—	—	—	—	—	—	—	—	N/A		N/A	—	—
1919–20	Div 1	1	42	13	14	15	54	50	40	12th	R2	N/A		N/A	Joe Spence	14
1920–21	Div 1	1	42	15	10	17	64	68	40	13th	R1	N/A		N/A	Tom Miller Teddy Partridge	8
1921–22	Div 1 ↓	1	42	8	12	22	41	73	28	22nd	R1	N/A		N/A	Joe Spence	15
1922–23	Div 2	2	42	17	14	11	51	36	48	4th	R2	N/A		N/A	Ernie Goldthorpe	14
1923–24	Div 2	2	42	13	14	15	52	44	40	14th	R2	N/A	Not eligible	N/A	Arthur Lochhead	14
1924–25	Div 2 ↑	2	42	23	11	8	57	23	57	2nd	R1	N/A	Not eligible	N/A	William Henderson	14
1925–26	Div 1	1	42	19	6	17	66	73	44	9th	SF	N/A	Not eligible	N/A	Frank McPherson	20
1926–27	Div 1	1	42	13	14	15	52	64	40	15th	R3	N/A	Not eligible	N/A	Joe Spence	19
1927–28	Div 1	1	42	16	7	19	72	80	39	18th	R6	N/A		N/A	Joe Spence	24
1928–29	Div 1	1	42	14	13	15	66	76	41	12th	R4	N/A		N/A	Jimmy Hanson	20
1929–30	Div 1	1	42	15	8	19	67	88	38	17th	R3	N/A	Not eligible	N/A	Harry Rowley Joe Spence	12
1930–31	Div 1 ↓	1	42	7	8	27	53	115	22	22nd	R4	N/A		N/A	Tommy Reid	20
1931–32	Div 2	2	42	17	8	17	71	72	42	12th	R3	N/A		N/A	Joe Spence	19
1932–33	Div 2	2	42	15	13	14	71	68	43	6th	R3	N/A		N/A	Bill Ridding	11
1933–34	Div 2	2	42	14	6	22	59	85	34	20th (Note: Lowest League finish)	R3	N/A		N/A	Neil Dewar	8
1934–35	Div 2	2	42	23	4	15	76	55	50	5th	R4	N/A		N/A	George Mutch	19
1935–36	Div 2 ↑	2	42	22	12	8	85	43	56	**1st**	R4	N/A		N/A	George Mutch	23
1936–37	Div 1 ↓	1	42	10	12	20	55	78	32	21st	R4	N/A		N/A	Tommy Bamford	15
1937–38	Div 2 ↑	2	42	22	9	11	82	50	53	2nd	R5	N/A		N/A	Harry Baird Tommy Bamford	15
1938–39	Div 1	1	42	11	16	15	57	65	38	14th	R3	N/A	Not eligible	N/A	Jimmy Hanlon	12
1939–40 (Note: The 1939–40 season was abandoned in early September and all results annulled, after only three matches had been played; Manchester United were tenth in the table at the time.)	Div 1	1	3	1	1	1	5	3	3	10th	—	N/A	—	N/A	**Billy Bryant**	2
1940–45 (Note: No competitive football was played between 1939 and 1946 due to the Second World War.)	—	1	—	—	—	—	—	—	—	—	—	N/A		N/A	—	—
1945–46 (Note: The FA Cup was contested in 1945–46 but the Football League did not resume until the following season.)	—	1	—	—	—	—	—	—	—	—	R4	N/A	—	N/A	Jimmy Hanlon Jack Rowley Billy Wrigglesworth	2
1946–47	Div 1	1	42	22	12	8	95	54	56	2nd	R4	N/A	—	N/A	Jack Rowley	28
1947–48	Div 1	1	42	19	14	9	81	48	52	2nd	**Winners**	N/A	—	N/A	Jack Rowley	28
1948–49	Div 1	1	42	21	11	10	77	44	53	2nd	SF	N/A	Runners-up	N/A	Jack Rowley	29
1949–50	Div 1	1	42	18	14	10	69	44	50	4th	R6	N/A		N/A	Jack Rowley	23
1950–51	Div 1	1	42	24	8	10	74	40	56	2nd	R6	N/A		N/A	Stan Pearson	23
1951–52	Div 1	1	42	23	11	8	95	52	57	**1st**	R3	N/A		N/A	Jack Rowley	30
1952–53	Div 1	1	42	18	10	14	69	72	46	8th	R5	N/A	**Winners**	N/A	Stan Pearson	18
1953–54	Div 1	1	42	18	12	12	73	58	48	4th	R3	N/A		N/A	Tommy Taylor	23
1954–55	Div 1	1	42	20	7	15	84	74	47	5th	R4	N/A		N/A	Dennis Viollet	21
1955–56	Div 1	1	42	25	10	7	83	51	60	**1st**	R3	N/A			Tommy Taylor	25
1956–57	Div 1	1	42	28	8	6	103	54	64	**1st**	Runners-up	N/A	**Winners**	European Cup – SF	Tommy Taylor	34
1957–58	Div 1	1	42	16	11	15	85	75	43	9th	Runners-up	N/A	**Winners**	European Cup – SF	Dennis Viollet	23
1958–59	Div 1	1	42	24	7	11	103	66	55	2nd	R3	N/A			Bobby Charlton	29
1959–60	Div 1	1	42	19	7	16	102	80	45	7th	R5	N/A			**Dennis Viollet**	**32** (Note: 32 goals in the First Division)
1960–61	Div 1	1	42	18	9	15	88	76	45	7th	R4	R2			Bobby Charlton	21
1961–62	Div 1	1	42	15	9	18	72	75	39	15th	SF	N/A (Note: Despite entering the first League Cup in 1960–61, like many other major clubs, Manchester United declined to take part again until the 1966–67 season. They then missed two consecutive seasons in 1967–68 and 1968–69.)			David Herd	17
1962–63	Div 1	1	42	12	10	20	67	81	34	19th	**Winners**	N/A			Denis Law	29
1963–64	Div 1	1	42	23	7	12	90	62	53	2nd	SF	N/A	Runners-up	Cup Winners' Cup – QF	Denis Law	46
1964–65	Div 1	1	42	26	9	7	89	39	61	**1st**	SF	N/A		Inter-Cities Fairs Cup – SF	Denis Law	39
1965–66	Div 1	1	42	18	15	9	84	59	51	4th	SF	N/A	Shared (Note: From 1939 to 1993, in the event of a draw, the Charity Shield was shared between the two competing teams, with each team having possession of the trophy for six months.)	European Cup – SF	David Herd	33
1966–67	Div 1	1	42	24	12	6	84	45	60	**1st**	R4	R2			Denis Law	25
1967–68	Div 1	1	42	24	8	10	89	55	56	2nd	R3	N/A	Shared	**European Cup – Winners**	**George Best** (Note: Joint top scorer with Ron Davies of Southampton)	**32** (Note: 28 goals in the First Division)
1968–69	Div 1	1	42	15	12	15	57	53	42	11th	R6	N/A		European Cup – SF; Intercontinental Cup – Runners-up	Denis Law	30
1969–70	Div 1	1	42	14	17	11	66	61	45	8th	Third place	SF			George Best	23
1970–71	Div 1	1	42	16	11	15	65	66	43	8th	R3	SF			George Best	21
1971–72	Div 1	1	42	19	10	13	69	61	48	8th	R6	R4			George Best	26
1972–73	Div 1	1	42	12	13	17	44	60	37	18th	R3	R3			Bobby Charlton	7
1973–74	Div 1 ↓	1	42	10	12	20	38	48	32	21st	R4	R2			Lou Macari Sammy McIlroy	6
1974–75	Div 2 ↑	2	42	26	9	7	66	30	61	**1st**	R3	SF			Lou Macari Stuart Pearson	18
1975–76	Div 1	1	42	23	10	9	68	42	56	3rd	Runners-up	R4			Lou Macari	15
1976–77	Div 1	1	42	18	11	13	71	62	47	6th	**Winners**	R5		UEFA Cup – R2	Gordon Hill	22
1977–78	Div 1	1	42	16	10	16	67	63	42	10th	R4	R2	Shared	Cup Winners' Cup – R2	Gordon Hill	19
1978–79	Div 1	1	42	15	15	12	60	63	45	9th	Runners-up	R3			Jimmy Greenhoff	17
1979–80	Div 1	1	42	24	10	8	65	35	58	2nd	R3	R3			Joe Jordan	13
1980–81	Div 1	1	42	15	18	9	51	36	48	8th	R4	R2		UEFA Cup – R1	Joe Jordan	15
1981–82 (Note: The 1981–82 season saw the introduction of three points for a win.)	Div 1	1	42	22	12	8	59	29	78	3rd	R3	R2			Frank Stapleton	13
1982–83	Div 1	1	42	19	13	10	56	38	70	3rd	**Winners**	Runners-up		UEFA Cup – R1	Frank Stapleton	19
1983–84	Div 1	1	42	20	14	8	71	41	74	4th	R3	R4	**Winners**	Cup Winners' Cup – SF	Frank Stapleton	19
1984–85	Div 1	1	42	22	10	10	77	47	76	4th	**Winners**	R3		UEFA Cup – QF	Mark Hughes	24
1985–86	Div 1	1	42	22	10	10	70	36	76	4th	R5	R4	Runners-up	Ban on English teams	Mark Hughes	18
1986–87	Div 1	1	42	14	14	14	52	45	56	11th	R4	R3		Ban on English teams	Peter Davenport	16
1987–88	Div 1	1	40	23	12	5	71	38	81	2nd	R5	R5		Ban on English teams	Brian McClair	31
1988–89	Div 1	1	38	13	12	13	45	35	51	11th	R6	R3		Ban on English teams	Mark Hughes Brian McClair	16
1989–90	Div 1	1	38	13	9	16	46	47	48	13th	**Winners**	R3		Ban on English teams	Mark Hughes	15
1990–91	Div 1	1	38	16	12	10	58	45	59 (Note: Manchester United were deducted one point after a brawl in a game with Arsenal on 20 October 1990.)	6th	R5	Runners-up	Shared	**Cup Winners' Cup – Winners**	Mark Hughes Brian McClair	21
1991–92	Div 1	1	42	21	15	6	63	33	78	2nd	R4	**Winners**		Cup Winners' Cup – R2; **Super Cup – Winners**	Brian McClair	24
1992–93	Prem (Note: The 22 top English clubs broke away from the Football League to form the FA Premier League as the new top tier of the English football pyramid.)	1	42	24	12	6	67	31	84	**1st**	R5	R3		UEFA Cup – R1	Mark Hughes	16
1993–94	Prem	1	42	27	11	4	80	38	92	**1st**	**Winners**	Runners-up	**Winners**	Champions League – R2	Eric Cantona	25
1994–95	Prem	1	42	26	10	6	77	28	88	2nd	Runners-up	R3	**Winners**	Champions League – Group	Andrei Kanchelskis	15
1995–96	Prem	1	38	25	7	6	73	35	82	**1st**	**Winners**	R2		UEFA Cup – R1	Eric Cantona	19
1996–97	Prem	1	38	21	12	5	76	44	75	**1st**	R4	R4	**Winners**	Champions League – SF	Ole Gunnar Solskjær	19
1997–98	Prem	1	38	23	8	7	73	26	77	2nd	R5	R3	**Winners**	Champions League – QF	Andy Cole	25
1998–99	Prem	1	38	22	13	3	80	37	79	**1st**	**Winners**	R5	Runners-up	**Champions League – Winners**	**Dwight Yorke** (Note: Joint top scorer with Jimmy Floyd Hasselbaink of Leeds United and Michael Owen of Liverpool)	**29** (Note: 18 goals in the Premier League)
1999–2000	Prem	1	38	28	7	3	97	45	91	**1st**	N/A (Note: Manchester United did not enter the 1999–2000 FA Cup due to their commitment to the 2000 FIFA Club World Championship in Brazil.)	R3	Runners-up	Champions League – QF; Super Cup – Runners-up; **Intercontinental Cup – Winners**; Club World Championship – Group	Dwight Yorke	24
2000–01	Prem	1	38	24	8	6	79	31	80	**1st**	R4	R4	Runners-up	Champions League – QF	Teddy Sheringham	21
2001–02	Prem	1	38	24	5	9	87	45	77	3rd	R4	R3	Runners-up	Champions League – SF	Ruud van Nistelrooy	36
2002–03	Prem	1	38	25	8	5	74	34	83	**1st**	R5	Runners-up		Champions League – QF	**Ruud van Nistelrooy**	**44** (Note: 25 goals in the Premier League)
2003–04	Prem	1	38	23	6	9	64	35	75	3rd	**Winners**	R4	**Winners**	Champions League – Round of 16	Ruud van Nistelrooy	30
2004–05	Prem	1	38	22	11	5	58	26	77	3rd	Runners-up	SF	Runners-up	Champions League – Round of 16	Wayne Rooney	17
2005–06	Prem	1	38	25	8	5	72	34	83	2nd	R5	**Winners**		Champions League – Group	Ruud van Nistelrooy	24
2006–07	Prem	1	38	28	5	5	83	27	89	**1st**	Runners-up	R4		Champions League – SF	Wayne Rooney Cristiano Ronaldo	23
2007–08	Prem	1	38	27	6	5	80	22	87	**1st**	R6	R3	**Winners**	**Champions League – Winners**	**Cristiano Ronaldo**	**42** (Note: 31 goals in the Premier League)
2008–09	Prem	1	38	28	6	4	68	24	90	**1st**	SF	**Winners**	**Winners**	Champions League – Runners-up; Super Cup – Runners-up; **Club World Cup – Winners**	Cristiano Ronaldo	26
2009–10	Prem	1	38	27	4	7	86	28	85	2nd	R3	**Winners**	Runners-up	Champions League – QF	Wayne Rooney	34
2010–11	Prem	1	38	23	11	4	78	37	80	**1st**	SF	R5	**Winners**	Champions League – Runners-up	**Dimitar Berbatov** (Note: Joint top scorer with Carlos Tevez of Manchester City)	**21** (Note: 20 goals in the Premier League)
2011–12	Prem	1	38	28	5	5	89	33	89	2nd	R4	R5	**Winners**	Champions League – Group; Europa League – Round of 16	Wayne Rooney	34
2012–13	Prem	1	38	28	5	5	86	43	89	**1st**	R6	R4		Champions League – Round of 16	**Robin van Persie**	**30** (Note: 26 goals in the Premier League)
2013–14	Prem	1	38	19	7	12	64	43	64	7th	R3	SF	**Winners**	Champions League – QF	Wayne Rooney	19
2014–15	Prem	1	38	20	10	8	62	37	70	4th	R6	R2			Wayne Rooney	14
2015–16	Prem	1	38	19	9	10	49	35	66	5th	**Winners**	R4		Champions League – Group; Europa League – Round of 16	Anthony Martial	17
2016–17	Prem	1	38	18	15	5	54	29	69	6th	R6	**Winners**	**Winners**	**Europa League – Winners**	Zlatan Ibrahimović	28
2017–18	Prem	1	38	25	6	7	68	28	81	2nd	Runners-up	R5		Champions League – Round of 16; Super Cup – Runners-up	Romelu Lukaku	27
2018–19	Prem	1	38	19	9	10	65	54	66	6th	R6	R3		Champions League – QF	Paul Pogba	16
2019–20	Prem	1	38	18	12	8	66	36	66	3rd	SF	SF		Europa League – SF	Anthony Martial	23
2020–21	Prem	1	38	21	11	6	73	44	74	2nd	R6	SF		Champions League – Group; Europa League – Runners-up	Bruno Fernandes	28
2021–22	Prem	1	38	16	10	12	57	57	58	6th	R4	R3		Champions League – Round of 16	Cristiano Ronaldo	24
2022–23	Prem	1	38	23	6	9	58	43	75	3rd	Runners-up	**Winners**		Europa League – QF	Marcus Rashford	30
2023–24	Prem	1	38	18	6	14	57	58	60	8th	**Winners**	R4		Champions League – Group	Rasmus Højlund	16
2024–25	Prem	1	38	11	9	18	44	54	42	15th	R5	R5	Runners-up	Europa League – Runners-up	Bruno Fernandes	19
2025–26	Prem	1	38	20	11	7	69	50	71	3rd	R3	R2			Bryan Mbeumo Benjamin Šeško	12
