= 1928–29 Manchester United F.C. season =

English football club season

Manchester United
1928–29 season
- Chairman: George Lawton
- Manager: Herbert Bamlett
- First Division: 12th
- FA Cup: Fourth Round
- Top goalscorer: League: Jimmy Hanson (19); All: Jimmy Hanson (20)
- Highest home attendance: 42,555 vs Manchester City (5 January 1929)
- Lowest home attendance: 12,020 vs West Ham United (2 February 1929)
- Average home league attendance: 24,460
Home colours	Away colours

The 1928–29 season was Manchester United's 33rd season in the Football League.

== First Division ==
Date	Opponents	H / A	Result F–A	Scorers	Attendance
25 August 1928	Leicester City	H	1–1	Rawlings	20,129
27 August 1928	Aston Villa	A	0–0		30,356
1 September 1928	Manchester City	A	2–2	Johnston, Wilson	61,007
8 September 1928	Leeds United	A	2–3	Johnston, Spence	28,723
15 September 1928	Liverpool	H	2–2	Hanson, Silcock	24,077
22 September 1928	West Ham United	A	1–3	Rawlings	20,788
29 September 1928	Newcastle United	H	5–0	Rawlings (2), Hanson, Johnston, Spence	25,243
6 October 1928	Burnley	A	4–3	Hanson (2), Spence (2)	17,493
13 October 1928	Cardiff City	H	1–1	Johnston	26,010
20 October 1928	Birmingham	H	1–0	Johnston	17,522
27 October 1928	Huddersfield Town	A	2–1	Hanson, Spence	13,648
3 November 1928	Bolton Wanderers	H	1–1	Hanson	31,185
10 November 1928	The Wednesday	A	1–2	Hanson	18,113
17 November 1928	Derby County	H	0–1		26,122
24 November 1928	Sunderland	A	1–5	Rowley	15,932
1 December 1928	Blackburn Rovers	H	1–4	Ramsden	19,589
8 December 1928	Arsenal	A	1–3	Hanson	18,923
15 December 1928	Everton	H	1–1	Hanson	17,080
22 December 1928	Portsmouth	A	0–3		12,836
25 December 1928	Sheffield United	H	1–1	Ramsden	22,202
26 December 1928	Sheffield United	A	1–6	Rawlings	34,696
29 December 1928	Leicester City	A	1–2	Hanson	21,535
1 January 1929	Aston Villa	H	2–2	Hilditch, Rowley	25,935
5 January 1929	Manchester City	H	1–2	Rawlings	42,555
19 January 1929	Leeds United	H	1–2	Sweeney	21,995
2 February 1929	West Ham United	H	2–3	Reid, Rowley	12,020
9 February 1929	Newcastle United	A	0–5		31,134
13 February 1929	Liverpool	A	3–2	Reid (2), Thomas	8,852
16 February 1929	Burnley	H	1–0	Rowley	12,516
23 February 1929	Cardiff City	A	2–2	Hanson, Reid	13,070
2 March 1929	Birmingham	A	1–1	Hanson	16,738
9 March 1929	Huddersfield Town	H	1–0	Hanson	28,183
16 March 1929	Bolton Wanderers	A	1–1	Hanson	17,354
23 March 1929	The Wednesday	H	2–1	Reid, Rowley	27,095
29 March 1929	Bury	A	3–1	Reid (2), Thomas	27,167
30 March 1929	Derby County	A	1–6	Hanson	14,619
1 April 1929	Bury	H	1–0	Thomas	29,742
6 April 1929	Sunderland	H	3–0	Hanson, Mann, Reid	27,772
13 April 1929	Blackburn Rovers	A	3–0	Reid (2), Ramsden	8,193
20 April 1929	Arsenal	H	4–1	Reid (2), Hanson, Thomas	22,858
27 April 1929	Everton	A	4–2	Hanson (2), Reid (2)	19,442
4 May 1929	Portsmouth	H	0–0		17,728

Pos	Team	Pld	W	D	L	GF	GA	GAv	Pts
10	Newcastle United	42	19	6	17	70	72	0.972	44
11	Sheffield United	42	15	11	16	86	85	1.012	41
12	Manchester United	42	14	13	15	66	76	0.868	41
13	Leeds United	42	16	9	17	71	84	0.845	41
14	Bolton Wanderers	42	14	12	16	73	80	0.913	40

Source: World Football
Rules for classification: 1) Points; 2) Goal average; 3) Goals scored

== FA Cup ==
Date	Round	Opponents	H / A	Result F–A	Scorers	Attendance
12 January 1929	Round 3	Port Vale	A	3–0	Hanson, Spence, Taylor	17,519
26 January 1929	Round 4	Bury	H	0–1		40,558
