= 1929–30 Manchester United F.C. season =

English football club season

Manchester United
1929–30 season
- Chairman: George Lawton
- Manager: Herbert Bamlett
- First Division: 17th
- FA Cup: Third Round
- Top goalscorer: League: Harry Rowley (12); Joe Spence (12); All: Harry Rowley (12); Joe Spence (12)
- Highest home attendance: 57,201 vs Manchester City (5 October 1929)
- Lowest home attendance: 5,656 vs Bolton Wanderers (7 December 1929)
- Average home league attendance: 19,223
Home colours	Away colours

The 1929–30 season was Manchester United's 34th season in the Football League.

== First Division ==
Date	Opponents	H / A	Result F–A	Scorers	Attendance
31 August 1929	Newcastle United	A	1–4	Spence	43,489
2 September 1929	Leicester City	A	1–4	Rowley	20,490
7 September 1929	Blackburn Rovers	H	1–0	Mann	22,362
11 September 1929	Leicester City	H	2–1	Ball, Spence	16,445
14 September 1929	Middlesbrough	A	3–2	Rawlings (3)	26,428
21 September 1929	Liverpool	H	1–2	Spence	20,788
28 September 1929	West Ham United	A	1–2	Hanson	20,695
5 October 1929	Manchester City	H	1–3	Thomas	57,201
7 October 1929	Sheffield United	A	1–3	Boyle	7,987
12 October 1929	Grimsby Town	H	2–5	Ball, Rowley	21,494
19 October 1929	Portsmouth	A	0–3		18,070
26 October 1929	Arsenal	H	1–0	Ball	12,662
2 November 1929	Aston Villa	A	0–1		24,292
9 November 1929	Derby County	H	3–2	Ball, Hanson, Rowley	15,174
16 November 1929	Sheffield Wednesday	A	2–7	Ball, Hanson	14,264
23 November 1929	Burnley	H	1–0	Rowley	9,060
30 November 1929	Sunderland	A	4–2	Spence (2), Ball, Hanson	11,508
7 December 1929	Bolton Wanderers	H	1–1	Ball	5,656
14 December 1929	Everton	A	0–0		18,182
21 December 1929	Leeds United	H	3–1	Ball (2), Hanson	15,054
25 December 1929	Birmingham	H	0–0		18,626
26 December 1929	Birmingham	A	1–0	Rowley	35,682
28 December 1929	Newcastle United	H	5–0	Boyle (2), McLachlan, Rowley, Spence	14,862
4 January 1930	Blackburn Rovers	A	4–5	Boyle (2), Ball, Rowley	23,923
18 January 1930	Middlesbrough	H	0–3		21,028
25 January 1930	Liverpool	A	0–1		28,592
1 February 1930	West Ham United	H	4–2	Spence (4)	15,424
8 February 1930	Manchester City	A	1–0	Reid	64,472
15 February 1930	Grimsby Town	A	2–2	Reid, Rowley	9,337
22 February 1930	Portsmouth	H	3–0	Reid (2), Boyle	17,317
1 March 1930	Bolton Wanderers	A	1–4	Reid	17,714
8 March 1930	Aston Villa	H	2–3	McLachlan, Warburton	25,407
12 March 1930	Arsenal	A	2–4	Ball, Wilson	18,082
15 March 1930	Derby County	A	1–1	Rowley	9,102
29 March 1930	Burnley	A	0–4		11,659
5 April 1930	Sunderland	H	2–1	McLenahan (2)	13,230
14 April 1930	Sheffield Wednesday	H	2–2	McLenahan, Rowley	12,806
18 April 1930	Huddersfield Town	H	1–0	McLenahan	26,496
19 April 1930	Everton	H	3–3	McLenahan, Rowley, Spence	13,320
22 April 1930	Huddersfield Town	A	2–2	Hilditch, McLenahan	20,716
26 April 1930	Leeds United	A	1–3	Spence	10,596
3 May 1930	Sheffield United	H	1–5	Rowley	15,268

Pos	Team	Pld	W	D	L	GF	GA	GAv	Pts
15	Bolton Wanderers	42	15	9	18	74	74	1.000	39
16	Middlesbrough	42	16	6	20	82	84	0.976	38
17	Manchester United	42	15	8	19	67	88	0.761	38
18	Grimsby Town	42	15	7	20	73	89	0.820	37
19	Newcastle United	42	15	7	20	71	92	0.772	37

Rules for classification: 1) Points; 2) Goal average; 3) Goals scored

== FA Cup ==
Date	Round	Opponents	H / A	Result F–A	Scorers	Attendance
11 January 1930	Round 3	Swindon Town	H	0–2		33,226
