= 1922–23 Manchester United F.C. season =

English football club season

Manchester United
1922–23 season
- Chairman: John Henry Davies
- Manager: John Chapman
- Second Division: 4th
- FA Cup: Second Round
- Top goalscorer: League: Ernie Goldthorpe (13); Arthur Lochhead (13); All: Ernie Goldthorpe (14)
- Highest home attendance: 30,000 vs Crystal Palace (26 August 1922); 30,000 vs Southampton (3 March 1923); 30,000 vs Leicester City (21 April 1923)
- Lowest home attendance: 12,100 vs Notts County (21 February 1923)
- Average home league attendance: 22,950
Home colours	Away colours

The 1922–23 season was Manchester United's 27th season in the Football League. Having been relegated from the First Division the previous season, they finished the season fourth in the Second Division, just missing out on promotion from the division in which they had not played for nearly 20 years.

== Second Division ==
Date	Opponents	H / A	Result F–A	Scorers	Attendance
26 August 1922	Crystal Palace	H	2–1	Spence, Wood	30,000
28 August 1922	The Wednesday	A	0–1		12,500
2 September 1922	Crystal Palace	A	3–2	Spence (2), Williams	8,500
4 September 1922	The Wednesday	H	1–0	Spence	22,000
9 September 1922	Wolverhampton Wanderers	A	1–0	Williams	18,000
16 September 1922	Wolverhampton Wanderers	H	1–0	Spence	28,000
23 September 1922	Coventry City	A	0–2		19,000
30 September 1922	Coventry City	H	2–1	Henderson, Spence	25,000
7 October 1922	Port Vale	H	1–2	Spence	25,000
14 October 1922	Port Vale	A	0–1		16,000
21 October 1922	Fulham	H	1–1	Myerscough	18,000
28 October 1922	Fulham	A	0–0		20,000
4 November 1922	Clapton Orient	H	0–0		16,500
11 November 1922	Clapton Orient	A	1–1	Goldthorpe	11,000
18 November 1922	Bury	A	2–2	Goldthorpe (2)	21,000
25 November 1922	Bury	H	0–1		28,000
2 December 1922	Rotherham County	H	3–0	Lochhead, McBain, Spence	13,500
9 December 1922	Rotherham County	A	1–1	Goldthorpe	7,500
16 December 1922	Stockport County	H	1–0	McBain	24,000
23 December 1922	Stockport County	A	0–1		15,500
25 December 1922	West Ham United	H	1–2	Lochhead	17,500
26 December 1922	West Ham United	A	2–0	Lochhead (2)	25,000
30 December 1922	Hull City	A	1–2	Lochhead	6,750
1 January 1923	Barnsley	H	1–0	Lochhead	29,000
6 January 1923	Hull City	H	3–2	Goldthorpe, Lochhead, own goal	15,000
20 January 1923	Leeds United	H	0–0		25,000
27 January 1923	Leeds United	A	1–0	Lochhead	24,500
10 February 1923	Notts County	A	6–1	Goldthorpe (4), Myerscough (2)	10,000
17 February 1923	Derby County	H	0–0		27,500
21 February 1923	Notts County	H	1–1	Lochhead	12,100
3 March 1923	Southampton	H	1–2	Lochhead	30,000
14 March 1923	Derby County	A	1–1	MacDonald	12,000
17 March 1923	Bradford City	A	1–1	Goldthorpe	10,000
21 March 1923	Bradford City	H	1–1	Spence	15,000
30 March 1923	South Shields	H	3–0	Goldthorpe (2), Lochhead	26,000
31 March 1923	Blackpool	A	0–1		21,000
2 April 1923	South Shields	A	3–0	Goldthorpe, Hilditch, Spence	6,500
7 April 1923	Blackpool	H	2–1	Lochhead, Radford	20,000
11 April 1923	Southampton	A	0–0		5,500
14 April 1923	Leicester City	A	1–0	Bain	25,000
21 April 1923	Leicester City	H	0–2		30,000
28 April 1923	Barnsley	A	2–2	Lochhead, Spence	8,000

Pos	Team	Pld	W	D	L	GF	GA	GAv	Pts	Promotion or relegation
2	West Ham United (P)	42	20	11	11	63	38	1.658	51	Promotion to the First Division
3	Leicester City	42	21	9	12	65	44	1.477	51	
4	Manchester United	42	17	14	11	51	36	1.417	48	
5	Blackpool	42	18	11	13	60	43	1.395	47	
6	Bury	42	18	11	13	55	46	1.196	47	

(P) Promoted

== FA Cup ==
Date	Round	Opponents	H / A	Result F–A	Scorers	Attendance
13 January 1923	First Round	Bradford City	A	1–1	Partridge	27,000
17 January 1923	First Round; Replay	Bradford City	H	2–0	Barber, Goldthorpe	27,791
3 February 1923	Second Round	Tottenham Hotspur	A	0–4		38,333
