= 1924–25 Manchester United F.C. season =

English football club season

Manchester United
1924–25 season
- Chairman: John Henry Davies
- Manager: John Chapman
- Second Division: 2nd (promoted)
- FA Cup: First Round
- Top goalscorer: League: William Henderson (14); All: William Henderson (14)
- Highest home attendance: 59,500 vs Derby County (29 November 1924)
- Lowest home attendance: 9,500 vs Barnsley (8 September 1924)
- Average home league attendance: 26,940
Home colours	Away colours

The 1924–25 season was Manchester United's 29th season in the Football League.

At the end of the season, United finished second and were promoted back to the First Division as runners-up after three seasons in the Second Division.

== Second Division ==
Date	Opponents	H / A	Result F–A	Scorers	Attendance
30 August 1924	Leicester City	H	1–0	Goldthorpe	21,250
1 September 1924	Stockport County	A	1–2	Lochhead	12,500
6 September 1924	Stoke	A	0–0		15,250
8 September 1924	Barnsley	H	1–0	Henderson	9,500
13 September 1924	Coventry City	H	5–1	Henderson (2), Lochhead, McPherson, Spence	12,000
20 September 1924	Oldham Athletic	A	3–0	Henderson (3)	14,500
27 September 1924	The Wednesday	H	2–0	McPherson, Smith	29,500
4 October 1924	Clapton Orient	A	1–0	Lochhead	15,000
11 October 1924	Crystal Palace	H	1–0	Lochhead	27,750
18 October 1924	Southampton	A	2–0	Lochhead (2)	10,000
25 October 1924	Wolverhampton Wanderers	A	0–0		17,500
1 November 1924	Fulham	H	2–0	Henderson, Lochhead	24,000
8 November 1924	Portsmouth	A	1–1	Smith	19,500
15 November 1924	Hull City	H	2–0	Hanson, McPherson	29,750
22 November 1924	Blackpool	A	1–1	Hanson	9,500
29 November 1924	Derby County	H	1–1	Hanson	59,500
6 December 1924	South Shields	A	2–1	Henderson, McPherson	6,500
13 December 1924	Bradford City	H	3–0	Henderson (2), McPherson	18,250
20 December 1924	Port Vale	A	1–2	Lochhead	11,000
25 December 1924	Middlesbrough	A	1–1	Henderson	18,500
26 December 1924	Middlesbrough	H	2–0	Henderson, Smith	44,500
27 December 1924	Leicester City	A	0–3		18,250
1 January 1925	Chelsea	H	1–0	Grimwood	30,500
3 January 1925	Stoke	H	2–0	Henderson (2)	24,500
17 January 1925	Coventry City	A	0–1		9,000
24 January 1925	Oldham Athletic	H	0–1		20,000
7 February 1925	Clapton Orient	H	4–2	Kennedy (2), McPherson, Pape	18,250
14 February 1925	Crystal Palace	A	1–2	Lochhead	11,250
23 February 1925	The Wednesday	A	1–1	Pape	3,000
28 February 1925	Wolverhampton Wanderers	H	3–0	Spence (2), Kennedy	21,250
7 March 1925	Fulham	A	0–1		16,000
14 March 1925	Portsmouth	H	2–0	Lochhead, Spence	22,000
21 March 1925	Hull City	A	1–0	Lochhead	6,250
28 March 1925	Blackpool	H	0–0		26,250
4 April 1925	Derby County	A	0–1		24,000
10 April 1925	Stockport County	H	2–0	Pape (2)	43,500
11 April 1925	South Shields	H	1–0	Lochhead	24,000
13 April 1925	Chelsea	A	0–0		16,500
18 April 1925	Bradford City	A	1–0	Smith	13,250
22 April 1925	Southampton	H	1–1	Pape	26,500
25 April 1925	Port Vale	H	4–0	Lochhead, McPherson, Smith, Spence	33,500
2 May 1925	Barnsley	A	0–0		11,250

Pos	Team	Pld	W	D	L	GF	GA	GAv	Pts	Promotion or relegation
1	Leicester City (C, P)	42	24	11	7	90	32	2.813	59	Promotion to the First Division
2	Manchester United (P)	42	23	11	8	57	23	2.478	57	Promotion to the First Division
3	Derby County	42	22	11	9	71	36	1.972	55	
4	Portsmouth	42	15	18	9	58	50	1.160	48	
5	Chelsea	42	16	15	11	51	37	1.378	47	

(C) Champions; (P) Promoted

== FA Cup ==
Date	Round	Opponents	H / A	Result F–A	Scorers	Attendance
10 January 1925	First Round	The Wednesday	A	0–2		35,079
