= Jimmy Bain (footballer, born 1899) =

Scottish footballer and manager

Personal information
- Full name: James Bain
- Date of birth: 6 February 1899
- Place of birth: Rutherglen, Scotland
- Date of death: 22 September 1969 (aged 70)
- Place of death: Polegate, England
- Height: 5 ft 9 in (1.75 m)
- Position: Centre half

Senior career*
Years	Team	Apps	(Gls)
- Rutherglen Glencairn
–1922	Strathclyde		
1922–1928	Manchester United	4	(0)
1928	Manchester Central		
1928–1934	Brentford	191	(2)
Total		195	(2)

Managerial career
- 1952–1953: Brentford
- * Club domestic league appearances and goals

James Bain (6 February 1899 – 22 September 1969) was a Scottish professional footballer and manager, best remembered for his 28 years as a player, manager and assistant manager at Brentford. In 2013, Bain placed fifth in a Football League 125th Anniversary poll of Brentford's best ever captains and was inducted into the club's Hall of Fame in May 2015.

== Club career ==
=== Early years and Manchester United ===
A centre half, Bain's began his career with hometown junior club Rutherglen Glencairn. He moved to Strathclyde and off the back of his performances earned a transfer to English Second Division club Manchester United in May 1922. Bain failed to make an appearance for the first team during the 1922–23 and 1923–24 seasons and finally made his professional debut in a 4–2 win over Leyton Orient on 7 February 1925. It proved to be his only appearance of the 1924–25 season, which meant he missed out on a Second Division winners' medal. Bain managed just two appearances during the 1925–26 First Division season and did not appear for the first team at all during 1926–27. His fourth and final appearance for the club came in a 3–0 defeat to Blackburn Rovers on 19 September 1927. Bain departed Old Trafford in July 1928.

=== Manchester Central and Brentford ===
Bain joined newly-formed Lancashire Combination club Manchester Central in 1928. After a six-month spell, Bain returned to the Football League as a £250 signing for Third Division South club Brentford in November 1928. An immediate hit with the Bees, he was awarded the captaincy and helped the club to the 1932–33 Third Division South title. He retired from playing in 1934, after making 201 appearances and scoring two goals for Brentford. In 2013, Bain placed fifth in a Football League 125th Anniversary poll of Brentford's best ever captains.

== Coaching and management ==
Bain became assistant to manager Harry Curtis at Brentford in 1934. Under Curtis, he was a part of the most successful period in the club's history, which saw the Bees crowned Second Division and London Challenge Cup champions in the 1934–35 season, finish fifth in the First Division in 1935–36 (the club's highest ever league placing) and win the 1942 London War Cup. After Curtis' departure in 1949, Bain served as assistant to Jackie Gibbons (1949–1952), Tommy Lawton (1953) and Bill Dodgin, Sr. (1953–1956).

Bain was named as successor to manager Jackie Gibbons in August 1952. He lasted until January 1953, before being replaced by player-manager Tommy Lawton. Prior to the dismissal of Eddie May in 1997, Bain's tenure was the shortest on record for a permanent Brentford manager. Bain retired from football at the end of the 1955–56 season and received a Football League Long Service Medal for the contribution he made at Griffin Park. He was awarded a testimonial in 1956, in which Brentford drew 1–1 with an All-Star XI. Bain was posthumously inducted into the club's Hall of Fame in May 2015.

== Personal life ==
Bain's younger brother David was also a professional footballer who played for Manchester United (the siblings coincided on the club staff for two years, but never appeared together in a competitive fixture).

== Career statistics ==
Appearances and goals by club, season and competition
Club	Season	League			FA Cup		Total	
Club	Season	Division	Apps	Goals	Apps	Goals	Apps	Goals
Manchester United	1924–25	Second Division	1	0	0	0	1	0
Manchester United	1925–26	First Division	2	0	0	0	2	0
Manchester United	1927–28	First Division	1	0	0	0	1	0
Manchester United	Total		4	0	0	0	4	0
Brentford	1928–29	Third Division South	26	0	—		26	0
Brentford	1929–30	Third Division South	41	2	1	0	42	2
Brentford	1930–31	Third Division South	42	0	5	0	47	0
Brentford	1931–32	Third Division South	37	0	3	0	40	0
Brentford	1932–33	Third Division South	37	0	1	0	38	0
Brentford	1933–34	Second Division	8	0	0	0	8	0
Brentford	Total		191	2	10	0	201	2
Career total			195	2	10	0	205	2

== Managerial statistics ==
Managerial record by team and tenure
Team	From	To	Record					Ref
Team	From	To	P	W	D	L	Win %	Ref
Brentford	August 1952	2 January 1953	23	7	5	11	30.4	
Total			23	7	5	11	30.4	—

== Honours ==
Brentford

- Football League Third Division South: 1932–33

Individual

- Brentford Hall of Fame
