= 1926–27 Manchester United F.C. season =

English football club season

Manchester United
1926–27 season
- Chairman: John Henry Davies
- Manager: John Chapman (until 8 October 1926); Lal Hilditch (8 October 1926–13 April 1927); Herbert Bamlett (from 13 April 1927)
- First Division: 15th
- FA Cup: Third Round
- Top goalscorer: League: Joe Spence (18); All: Joe Spence (19)
- Highest home attendance: 50,665 vs Tottenham Hotspur (27 December 1926)
- Lowest home attendance: 14,709 vs Bury (5 March 1927)
- Average home league attendance: 26,274
Home colours	Away colours

The 1926–27 season was Manchester United's 31st season in the Football League.

During the season on 7 October 1926, The Football Association announced that United manager John Chapman had been suspended from "taking part in football or football management for improper conduct in his position as Secretary-Manager of the Manchester United Football Club". No further explanation for the suspension was ever given. By the next match, two days later against Bolton Wanderers, Lal Hilditch had taken over on a temporary basis as player-manager. Hilditch managed the team until 13 April 1927 when Herbert Bamlett appointed as the new United manager.

== First Division ==
Date	Opponents	H / A	Result F–A	Scorers	Attendance
28 August 1926	Liverpool	A	2–4	McPherson (2)	34,795
30 August 1926	Sheffield United	A	2–2	McPherson (2)	14,844
4 September 1926	Leeds United	H	2–2	McPherson (2)	26,338
11 September 1926	Newcastle United	A	2–4	McPherson, Spence	28,050
15 September 1926	Arsenal	H	2–2	Hanson, Spence	15,259
18 September 1926	Burnley	H	2–1	Spence (2)	32,593
25 September 1926	Cardiff City	A	2–0	Rennox, Spence	17,267
2 October 1926	Aston Villa	H	2–1	Barson, Rennox	31,234
9 October 1926	Bolton Wanderers	A	0–4		17,869
16 October 1926	Bury	A	3–0	Spence (2), McPherson	22,728
23 October 1926	Birmingham	H	0–1		32,010
30 October 1926	West Ham United	A	0–4		17,733
6 November 1926	The Wednesday	H	0–0		16,166
13 November 1926	Leicester City	A	3–2	McPherson (2), Rennox	18,521
20 November 1926	Everton	H	2–1	Rennox (2)	24,361
27 November 1926	Blackburn Rovers	A	1–2	Spence	17,280
4 December 1926	Huddersfield Town	H	0–0		33,135
11 December 1926	Sunderland	A	0–6		15,385
18 December 1926	West Bromwich Albion	H	2–0	Sweeney (2)	18,585
25 December 1926	Tottenham Hotspur	A	1–1	Spence	37,287
27 December 1926	Tottenham Hotspur	H	2–1	McPherson (2)	50,665
28 December 1926	Arsenal	A	0–1		30,111
1 January 1927	Sheffield United	H	5–0	McPherson (2), Barson, Rennox, Sweeney	33,593
15 January 1927	Liverpool	H	0–1		30,304
22 January 1927	Leeds United	A	3–2	McPherson, Rennox, Spence	16,816
5 February 1927	Burnley	A	0–1		22,010
9 February 1927	Newcastle United	H	3–1	Hanson, Harris, Spence	25,402
12 February 1927	Cardiff City	H	1–1	Hanson	26,213
19 February 1927	Aston Villa	A	0–2		32,467
26 February 1927	Bolton Wanderers	H	0–0		29,618
5 March 1927	Bury	H	1–2	Smith	14,709
12 March 1927	Birmingham	A	0–4		14,392
19 March 1927	West Ham United	H	0–3		18,347
26 March 1927	The Wednesday	A	0–2		11,997
2 April 1927	Leicester City	H	1–0	Spence	17,119
9 April 1927	Everton	A	0–0		22,564
15 April 1927	Derby County	H	2–2	Spence (2)	31,110
16 April 1927	Blackburn Rovers	H	2–0	Hanson, Spence	24,845
18 April 1927	Derby County	A	2–2	Spence (2)	17,306
23 April 1927	Huddersfield Town	A	0–0		13,870
30 April 1927	Sunderland	H	0–0		17,300
7 May 1927	West Bromwich Albion	A	2–2	Hanson, Spence	6,668

Pos	Team	Pld	W	D	L	GF	GA	GAv	Pts
13	Tottenham Hotspur	42	16	9	17	76	78	0.974	41
14	Cardiff City	42	16	9	17	55	65	0.846	41
15	Manchester United	42	13	14	15	52	64	0.813	40
16	The Wednesday	42	15	9	18	75	92	0.815	39
17	Birmingham	42	17	4	21	64	73	0.877	38

Source: World Football
Rules for classification: 1) Points; 2) Goal average; 3) Goals scored

== FA Cup ==
Date	Round	Opponents	H / A	Result F–A	Scorers	Attendance
8 January 1927	Round 3	Reading	A	1–1	Bennion	28,918
12 January 1927	Round 3 Replay	Reading	H	2–2	Spence, Sweeney	29,122
17 January 1927	Round 3 Replay	Reading	N	1–2	McPherson	16,500
