= 1925–26 Manchester United F.C. season =

English football club season

Manchester United
1925–26 season
- Chairman: John Henry Davies
- Manager: John Chapman
- First Division: 9th
- FA Cup: Semi-finals
- Top goalscorer: League: Charlie Rennox (17); All: Frank McPherson (20)
- Highest home attendance: 58,661 vs Sunderland (24 February 1926)
- Lowest home attendance: 9,116 vs Cardiff City (28 April 1926)
- Average home league attendance: 29,749
Home colours	Away colours

The 1925–26 season was Manchester United's 30th in the Football League. Newly promoted to the First Division, they achieved their best finish since before the Great War by finishing ninth in the league.

== First Division ==
Date	Opponents	H / A	Result F–A	Scorers	Attendance
29 August 1925	West Ham United	A	0–1		25,630
2 September 1925	Aston Villa	H	3–0	Barson, Lochhead, Spence	41,717
5 September 1925	Arsenal	H	0–1		32,288
7 September 1925	Aston Villa	A	2–2	Hanson, Rennox	27,701
12 September 1925	Manchester City	A	1–1	Rennox	62,994
16 September 1925	Leicester City	H	3–2	Rennox (2), Lochhead	21,275
19 September 1925	Liverpool	A	0–5		18,824
26 September 1925	Burnley	H	6–1	Rennox (3), Hanson, Hilditch, Smith	17,259
3 October 1925	Leeds United	A	0–2		26,265
10 October 1925	Newcastle United	H	2–1	Rennox, Thomas	39,651
17 October 1925	Tottenham Hotspur	H	0–0		26,496
24 October 1925	Cardiff City	A	2–0	McPherson (2)	15,846
31 October 1925	Huddersfield Town	H	1–1	Thomas	37,213
7 November 1925	Everton	A	3–1	McPherson, Rennox, Spence	12,387
14 November 1925	Birmingham	H	3–1	Barson, Spence, Thomas	23,559
21 November 1925	Bury	A	3–1	McPherson (2), Spence	16,591
28 November 1925	Blackburn Rovers	H	2–0	McPherson, Thomas	33,660
5 December 1925	Sunderland	A	1–2	Rennox	25,507
12 December 1925	Sheffield United	H	1–2	McPherson	31,132
19 December 1925	West Bromwich Albion	A	1–5	McPherson	17,651
25 December 1925	Bolton Wanderers	H	2–1	Hanson, Spence	38,503
28 December 1925	Leicester City	A	3–1	McPherson (3)	28,367
2 January 1926	West Ham United	H	2–1	Rennox (2)	29,612
16 January 1926	Arsenal	A	2–3	McPherson, Spence	25,252
23 January 1926	Manchester City	H	1–6	Rennox	48,657
6 February 1926	Burnley	A	1–0	McPherson	17,141
13 February 1926	Leeds United	H	2–1	McPherson, Sweeney	29,584
27 February 1926	Tottenham Hotspur	A	1–0	Smith	25,466
10 March 1926	Liverpool	H	3–3	Hanson, Rennox, Spence	9,214
13 March 1926	Huddersfield Town	A	0–5		27,842
17 March 1926	Bolton Wanderers	A	1–3	McPherson	10,794
20 March 1926	Everton	H	0–0		30,058
2 April 1926	Notts County	A	3–0	Rennox (2), McPherson	18,453
3 April 1926	Bury	H	0–1		41,085
5 April 1926	Notts County	H	0–1		19,606
10 April 1926	Blackburn Rovers	A	0–7		15,870
14 April 1926	Newcastle United	A	1–4	Hanson	9,829
19 April 1926	Birmingham	A	1–2	Rennox	8,948
21 April 1926	Sunderland	H	5–1	Taylor (3), Smith, Thomas	10,918
24 April 1926	Sheffield United	A	0–2		15,571
28 April 1926	Cardiff City	H	1–0	Inglis	9,116
1 May 1926	West Bromwich Albion	H	3–2	Taylor (3)	9,974

Pos	Team	Pld	W	D	L	GF	GA	GAv	Pts
7	Liverpool	42	14	16	12	70	63	1.111	44
8	Bolton Wanderers	42	17	10	15	75	76	0.987	44
9	Manchester United	42	19	6	17	66	73	0.904	44
10	Newcastle United	42	16	10	16	84	75	1.120	42
11	Everton	42	12	18	12	72	70	1.029	42

Source: World Football
Rules for classification: 1) Points; 2) Goal average; 3) Goals scored

== FA Cup ==
Date	Round	Opponents	H / A	Result F–A	Scorers	Attendance
9 January 1926	Round 3	Port Vale	A	3–2	Spence (2), McPherson	14,841
30 January 1926	Round 4	Tottenham Hotspur	A	2–2	Spence, Thomas	40,000
3 February 1926	Round 4 Replay	Tottenham Hotspur	H	2–0	Rennox, Spence	45,000
20 February 1926	Round 5	Sunderland	A	3–3	Smith (2), McPherson	50,500
24 February 1926	Round 5 Replay	Sunderland	H	2–1	McPherson, Smith	58,661
6 March 1926	Round 6	Fulham	A	2–1	McPherson, Smith	28,699
27 March 1926	Semi-finals	Manchester City	N	0–3		46,450
