= 1921–22 Manchester United F.C. season =

English football club season

Manchester United
1921–22 season
- Chairman: John Henry Davies
- Manager: Jack Robson (until October 1921); John Chapman
- First Division: 22nd (relegated)
- FA Cup: Third Round
- Top goalscorer: League: Joe Spence (15); All: Joe Spence (15)
- Highest home attendance: 56,000 vs Manchester City (29 October 1921)
- Lowest home attendance: 9,000 vs Bradford City (10 December 1921)
- Average home league attendance: 27,215
Home colours	Away colours

The 1921–22 season was Manchester United's 26th in the Football League and their 11th in the First Division.

At the end of the season, United finished last in the league and were relegated to the Second Division, where they had not played since 1906.

== First Division ==
Date	Opponents	H/A	Result F–A	Scorers	Attendance	League position
27 August 1921	Everton	A	0–5		30,000	22nd
29 August 1921	West Bromwich Albion	H	2–3	Partridge, Robinson	20,000	21st
3 September 1921	Everton	H	2–1	Harrison, Spence	25,000	19th
7 September 1921	West Bromwich Albion	A	0–0		15,000	17th
10 September 1921	Chelsea	A	0–0		35,000	19th
17 September 1921	Chelsea	H	0–0		28,000	20th
24 September 1921	Preston North End	A	2–3	Lochhead, Partridge	25,000	19th
1 October 1921	Preston North End	H	1–1	Spence	30,000	19th
8 October 1921	Tottenham Hotspur	A	2–2	Sapsford, Spence	35,000	18th
15 October 1921	Tottenham Hotspur	H	2–1	Sapsford, Spence	30,000	14th
22 October 1921	Manchester City	A	1–4	Spence	24,000	17th
29 October 1921	Manchester City	H	3–1	Spence (3)	56,000	15th
5 November 1921	Middlesbrough	H	3–5	Lochhead, Sapsford, Spence	30,000	17th
12 November 1921	Middlesbrough	A	0–2		18,000	17th
19 November 1921	Aston Villa	A	1–3	Spence	30,000	20th
26 November 1921	Aston Villa	H	1–0	Henderson	33,000	19th
3 December 1921	Bradford City	A	1–2	Spence	15,000	20th
10 December 1921	Bradford City	H	1–1	Henderson	9,000	20th
17 December 1921	Liverpool	A	1–2	Sapsford	40,000	21st
24 December 1921	Liverpool	H	0–0		30,000	21st
26 December 1921	Burnley	H	0–1		15,000	21st
27 December 1921	Burnley	A	2–4	Lochhead, Sapsford	10,000	21st
31 December 1921	Newcastle United	A	0–3		20,000	22nd
2 January 1922	Sheffield United	A	0–3		18,000	22nd
14 January 1922	Newcastle United	H	0–1		20,000	22nd
21 January 1922	Sunderland	A	1–2	Sapsford	10,000	22nd
28 January 1922	Sunderland	H	3–1	Lochhead, Sapsford, Spence	18,000	22nd
11 February 1922	Huddersfield Town	H	1–1	Spence	30,000	22nd
18 February 1922	Birmingham	A	1–0	Spence	20,000	21st
25 February 1922	Birmingham	H	1–1	Sapsford	35,000	21st
27 February 1922	Huddersfield Town	A	1–1	Sapsford	30,000	20th
11 March 1922	Arsenal	H	1–0	Spence	30,000	20th
18 March 1922	Blackburn Rovers	H	0–1		30,000	21st
25 March 1922	Blackburn Rovers	A	0–3		15,000	22nd
1 April 1922	Bolton Wanderers	H	0–1		28,000	22nd
5 April 1922	Arsenal	A	1–3	Lochhead	25,000	22nd
8 April 1922	Bolton Wanderers	A	0–1		28,000	22nd
15 April 1922	Oldham Athletic	H	0–3		30,000	22nd
17 April 1922	Sheffield United	H	3–2	Harrison, Lochhead, Partridge	28,000	22nd
22 April 1922	Oldham Athletic	A	1–1	Lochhead	30,000	22nd
29 April 1922	Cardiff City	H	1–1	Partridge	18,000	22nd
6 May 1922	Cardiff City	A	1–3	Lochhead	16,000	22nd

Pos	Team	Pld	W	D	L	GF	GA	GAv	Pts	Relegation
18	Birmingham	42	15	7	20	48	60	0.800	37	
19	Oldham Athletic	42	13	11	18	38	50	0.760	37	
20	Everton	42	12	12	18	57	55	1.036	36	
21	Bradford City (R)	42	11	10	21	48	72	0.667	32	Relegation to the Second Division
22	Manchester United (R)	42	8	12	22	41	73	0.562	28	Relegation to the Second Division

Source: World Football
Rules for classification: 1) Points; 2) Goal average; 3) Goals scored
(R) Relegated

== FA Cup ==
Date	Round	Opponents	H/A	Result F–A	Scorers	Attendance
7 January 1922	Round 3	Cardiff City	H	1–4	Sapsford	25,726
