= 1927–28 Manchester United F.C. season =

English football club season

Manchester United
1927–28 season
- Chairman: George Lawton
- Manager: Herbert Bamlett
- First Division: 18th
- FA Cup: Sixth Round
- Top goalscorer: League: Joe Spence (22); All: Joe Spence (24)
- Highest home attendance: 52,568 vs Birmingham (18 February 1928)
- Lowest home attendance: 9,545 vs Sunderland (25 April 1928)
- Average home league attendance: 27,029
Home colours	Away colours

The 1927–28 season was Manchester United's 32nd season in the Football League.

== First Division ==
Date	Opponents	H / A	Result F–A	Scorers	Attendance
27 August 1927	Middlesbrough	H	3–0	Spence (2), Hanson	44,957
29 August 1927	The Wednesday	A	2–0	Hanson, Partridge	17,944
3 September 1927	Birmingham	A	0–0		25,863
7 September 1927	The Wednesday	H	1–1	McPherson	18,759
10 September 1927	Newcastle United	H	1–7	Spence	50,217
17 September 1927	Huddersfield Town	A	2–4	Spence (2)	17,307
19 September 1927	Blackburn Rovers	A	0–3		18,243
24 September 1927	Tottenham Hotspur	H	3–0	Hanson (2), Spence	13,952
1 October 1927	Leicester City	A	0–1		22,385
8 October 1927	Everton	A	2–5	Bennion, Spence	40,080
15 October 1927	Cardiff City	H	2–2	Spence, Sweeney	31,090
22 October 1927	Derby County	H	5–0	Spence (3), Johnston, McPherson	18,304
29 October 1927	West Ham United	A	2–1	McPherson, own goal	21,972
5 November 1927	Portsmouth	H	2–0	McPherson, own goal	13,119
12 November 1927	Sunderland	A	1–4	Spence	13,319
19 November 1927	Aston Villa	H	5–1	Partridge (2), Johnston, McPherson, Spence	25,991
26 November 1927	Burnley	A	0–4		18,509
3 December 1927	Bury	H	0–1		23,581
10 December 1927	Sheffield United	A	1–2	Spence	11,984
17 December 1927	Arsenal	H	4–1	Hanson, McPherson, Partridge, Spence	18,120
24 December 1927	Liverpool	A	0–2		14,971
26 December 1927	Blackburn Rovers	H	1–1	Spence	31,131
31 December 1927	Middlesbrough	A	2–1	Hanson, Johnston	19,652
7 January 1928	Birmingham	H	1–1	Hanson	16,853
21 January 1928	Newcastle United	A	1–4	Partridge	25,912
4 February 1928	Tottenham Hotspur	A	1–4	Johnston	23,545
11 February 1928	Leicester City	H	5–2	Nicol (2), Spence (2), Hanson	16,640
25 February 1928	Cardiff City	A	0–2		15,579
7 March 1928	Huddersfield Town	H	0–0		35,413
10 March 1928	West Ham United	H	1–1	Johnston	21,577
14 March 1928	Everton	H	1–0	Rawlings	25,667
17 March 1928	Portsmouth	A	0–1		25,400
28 March 1928	Derby County	A	0–5		8,323
31 March 1928	Aston Villa	A	1–3	Rawlings	24,691
6 April 1928	Bolton Wanderers	A	2–3	Spence, Thomas	23,795
7 April 1928	Burnley	H	4–3	Rawlings (3), Williams	28,311
9 April 1928	Bolton Wanderers	H	2–1	Johnston, Rawlings	28,590
14 April 1928	Bury	A	3–4	Johnston, McLenahan, Williams	17,440
21 April 1928	Sheffield United	H	2–3	Rawlings, Thomas	27,137
25 April 1928	Sunderland	H	2–1	Hanson, Johnston	9,545
28 April 1928	Arsenal	A	1–0	Rawlings	22,452
5 May 1928	Liverpool	H	6–1	Spence (3), Rawlings (2), Hanson	30,625

Pos	Team	Pld	W	D	L	GF	GA	GAv	Pts
16	Liverpool	42	13	13	16	84	87	0.966	39
17	West Ham United	42	14	11	17	81	88	0.920	39
18	Manchester United	42	16	7	19	72	80	0.900	39
19	Burnley	42	16	7	19	82	98	0.837	39
20	Portsmouth	42	16	7	19	66	90	0.733	39

Source: World Football
Rules for classification: 1) Points; 2) Goal average; 3) Goals scored

== FA Cup ==
Date	Round	Opponents	H / A	Result F–A	Scorers	Attendance
14 January 1928	Round 3	Brentford	H	7–1	Hanson (4), Johnston, McPherson, Spence	18,538
28 January 1928	Round 4	Bury	A	1–1	Johnston	25,000
1 February 1928	Round 4 Replay	Bury	H	1–0	Spence	48,001
18 February 1928	Round 5	Birmingham	H	1–0	Johnston	52,568
3 March 1928	Round 6	Blackburn Rovers	A	0–2		42,312
