= 1920–21 Manchester United F.C. season =

English football club season

Manchester United
1920–21 season
- Chairman: John Henry Davies
- Manager: Jack Robson
- First Division: 13th
- FA Cup: First round
- Top goalscorer: League: Tom Miller (7); Teddy Partridge (7); George Sapsford (7); Joe Spence (7); All: Tom Miller (8); Teddy Partridge (8)
- Highest home attendance: 70,504 vs Aston Villa (27 December 1920)
- Lowest home attendance: 10,000 vs Derby County (7 May 1921)
- Average home league attendance: 36,750
| Home colours | Away colours |

The 1920–21 season was Manchester United's 25th season in the Football League and 10th in the First Division.

== First Division ==
| Date | Opponents | H / A | Result F–A | Scorers | Attendance |
|---|---|---|---|---|---|
| 28 August 1920 | Bolton Wanderers | H | 2–3 | Hopkin, Meehan | 50,000 |
| 30 August 1920 | Arsenal | A | 0–2 | | 40,000 |
| 4 September 1920 | Bolton Wanderers | A | 1–1 | Sapsford | 35,000 |
| 6 September 1920 | Arsenal | H | 1–1 | Spence | 45,000 |
| 11 September 1920 | Chelsea | H | 3–1 | Meehan (2), Leonard | 40,000 |
| 18 September 1920 | Chelsea | A | 2–1 | Leonard (2) | 35,000 |
| 25 September 1920 | Tottenham Hotspur | H | 0–1 | | 50,000 |
| 2 October 1920 | Tottenham Hotspur | A | 1–4 | Spence | 45,000 |
| 9 October 1920 | Oldham Athletic | H | 4–1 | Sapsford (2), Meehan, Miller | 50,000 |
| 16 October 1920 | Oldham Athletic | A | 2–2 | Spence, own goal | 20,000 |
| 23 October 1920 | Preston North End | H | 1–0 | Miller | 42,000 |
| 30 October 1920 | Preston North End | A | 0–0 | | 25,000 |
| 6 November 1920 | Sheffield United | H | 2–1 | Leonard (2) | 30,000 |
| 13 November 1920 | Sheffield United | A | 0–0 | | 18,000 |
| 20 November 1920 | Manchester City | H | 1–1 | Miller | 63,000 |
| 27 November 1920 | Manchester City | A | 0–3 | | 35,000 |
| 4 December 1920 | Bradford Park Avenue | H | 5–1 | Miller (2), Myerscough (2), Partridge | 25,000 |
| 11 December 1920 | Bradford Park Avenue | A | 4–2 | Myerscough (2), Miller, Partridge | 10,000 |
| 18 December 1920 | Newcastle United | H | 2–0 | Hopkin, Miller | 40,000 |
| 25 December 1920 | Aston Villa | A | 4–3 | Grimwood (2), Harrison, Partridge | 38,000 |
| 27 December 1920 | Aston Villa | H | 1–3 | Harrison | 70,504 |
| 1 January 1921 | Newcastle United | A | 3–6 | Hopkin, Partridge, Silcock | 40,000 |
| 15 January 1921 | West Bromwich Albion | H | 1–4 | Partridge | 30,000 |
| 22 January 1921 | West Bromwich Albion | A | 2–0 | Myerscough, Partridge | 30,000 |
| 5 February 1921 | Liverpool | H | 1–1 | Grimwood | 30,000 |
| 9 February 1921 | Liverpool | A | 0–2 | | 35,000 |
| 12 February 1921 | Everton | H | 1–2 | Meredith | 30,000 |
| 26 February 1921 | Sunderland | H | 3–0 | Harrison, Hilditch, Robinson | 40,000 |
| 5 March 1921 | Sunderland | A | 3–2 | Sapsford (2), Goodwin | 25,000 |
| 9 March 1921 | Everton | A | 0–2 | | 38,000 |
| 12 March 1921 | Bradford City | H | 1–1 | Robinson | 30,000 |
| 19 March 1921 | Bradford City | A | 1–1 | Sapsford | 25,000 |
| 25 March 1921 | Burnley | A | 0–1 | | 20,000 |
| 26 March 1921 | Huddersfield Town | A | 2–5 | Harris, Partridge | 17,000 |
| 28 March 1921 | Burnley | H | 0–3 | | 28,000 |
| 2 April 1921 | Huddersfield Town | H | 2–0 | Bissett, (2) or unknown? or ?? | 30,000 |
| 9 April 1921 | Middlesbrough | A | 4–2 | Spence (2), Bissett, Grimwood | 15,000 |
| 16 April 1921 | Middlesbrough | H | 0–1 | | 25,000 |
| 23 April 1921 | Blackburn Rovers | A | 0–2 | | 18,000 |
| 30 April 1921 | Blackburn Rovers | H | 0–1 | | 20,000 |
| 2 May 1921 | Derby County | A | 1–1 | Bissett | 8,000 |
| 7 May 1921 | Derby County | H | 3–0 | Spence (2), Sapsford | 10,000 |

| Pos | Team | Pld | W | D | L | GF | GA | GAv | Pts |
|---|---|---|---|---|---|---|---|---|---|
| 11 | Blackburn Rovers | 42 | 13 | 15 | 14 | 57 | 59 | 0.966 | 41 |
| 12 | Sunderland | 42 | 14 | 13 | 15 | 57 | 60 | 0.950 | 41 |
| 13 | Manchester United | 42 | 15 | 10 | 17 | 64 | 68 | 0.941 | 40 |
| 14 | West Bromwich Albion | 42 | 13 | 14 | 15 | 54 | 58 | 0.931 | 40 |
| 15 | Bradford City | 42 | 12 | 15 | 15 | 61 | 63 | 0.968 | 39 |

Source: World Football
Rules for classification: 1) Points; 2) Goal average; 3) Goals scored

== FA Cup ==
| Date | Round | Opponents | H / A | Result F–A | Scorers | Attendance |
|---|---|---|---|---|---|---|
| 8 January 1921 | First round | Liverpool | A | 1–1 | Miller | 40,000 |
| 12 January 1921 | First round Replay | Liverpool | H | 1–2 | Partridge | 30,000 |
