= 1923–24 Manchester United F.C. season =

English football club season

Manchester United
1923–24 season
- Chairman: John Henry Davies
- Manager: John Chapman
- Second Division: 14th
- FA Cup: Second Round
- Top goalscorer: League: Arthur Lochhead (14); All: Arthur Lochhead (14)
- Highest home attendance: 66,673 vs Huddersfield Town (2 February 1924)
- Lowest home attendance: 7,000 vs Coventry City (2 January 1924)
- Average home league attendance: 21,951
Home colours	Away colours

The 1923–24 season was Manchester United's 28th in the Football League. It was their second successive season in the Second Division, and after narrowly missing out on promotion a year earlier, they finished a disappointing 14th in the league.

== Second Division ==
Date	Opponents	H / A	Result F–A	Scorers	Attendance
25 August 1923	Bristol City	A	2–1	Lochhead, MacDonald	20,500
27 August 1923	Southampton	H	1–0	Goldthorpe	21,750
1 September 1923	Bristol City	H	2–1	Lochhead, Spence	21,000
3 September 1923	Southampton	A	0–0		11,500
8 September 1923	Bury	A	0–2		19,000
15 September 1923	Bury	H	0–1		43,000
22 September 1923	South Shields	A	0–1		9,750
29 September 1923	South Shields	H	1–1	Lochhead	22,250
6 October 1923	Oldham Athletic	A	2–3	own goals (2)	12,250
13 October 1923	Oldham Athletic	H	2–0	Bain (2)	26,000
20 October 1923	Stockport County	H	3–0	Mann (2), Bain	31,500
27 October 1923	Stockport County	A	2–3	Barber, Lochhead	16,500
3 November 1923	Leicester City	A	2–2	Lochhead (2)	17,000
10 November 1923	Leicester City	H	3–0	Lochhead, Mann, Spence	20,000
17 November 1923	Coventry City	A	1–1	own goal	13,580
1 December 1923	Leeds United	A	0–0		20,000
8 December 1923	Leeds United	H	3–1	Lochhead (2), Spence	22,250
15 December 1923	Port Vale	A	1–0	Grimwood	7,500
22 December 1923	Port Vale	H	5–0	Bain (3), Lochhead, Spence	11,750
25 December 1923	Barnsley	H	1–2	Grimwood	34,000
26 December 1923	Barnsley	A	0–1		12,000
29 December 1923	Bradford City	A	0–0		15,500
2 January 1924	Coventry City	H	1–2	Bain	7,000
5 January 1924	Bradford City	H	3–0	Bain, Lochhead, McPherson	18,000
19 January 1924	Fulham	A	1–3	Lochhead	15,500
26 January 1924	Fulham	H	0–0		25,000
6 February 1924	Blackpool	A	0–1		6,000
9 February 1924	Blackpool	H	0–0		13,000
16 February 1924	Derby County	A	0–3		12,000
23 February 1924	Derby County	H	0–0		25,000
1 March 1924	Nelson	A	2–0	Kennedy, Spence	2,750
8 March 1924	Nelson	H	0–1		8,500
15 March 1924	Hull City	H	1–1	Lochhead	13,000
22 March 1924	Hull City	A	1–1	Miller	6,250
29 March 1924	Stoke	H	2–2	Smith (2)	13,000
5 April 1924	Stoke	A	0–3		11,000
12 April 1924	Crystal Palace	H	5–1	Spence (4), Smith	8,000
18 April 1924	Clapton Orient	A	0–1		18,000
19 April 1924	Crystal Palace	A	1–1	Spence	7,000
21 April 1924	Clapton Orient	H	2–2	Evans (2)	11,000
26 April 1924	The Wednesday	H	2–0	Lochhead, Smith	7,500
3 May 1924	The Wednesday	A	0–2		7,250

Pos	Team	Pld	W	D	L	GF	GA	GAv	Pts
12	Leicester City	42	17	8	17	64	54	1.185	42
13	Stockport County	42	13	16	13	44	52	0.846	42
14	Manchester United	42	13	14	15	52	44	1.182	40
15	Crystal Palace	42	13	13	16	53	65	0.815	39
16	Port Vale	42	13	12	17	50	66	0.758	38

== FA Cup ==
Date	Round	Opponents	H / A	Result F–A	Scorers	Attendance
12 January 1924	First Round	Plymouth Argyle	H	1–0	McPherson	35,700
2 February 1924	Second Round	Huddersfield Town	H	0–3		66,673
