= Frank McPherson =

English footballer

Personal information
- Full name: Francis Comber McPherson
- Date of birth: 14 May 1901
- Place of birth: Barrow-in-Furness, England
- Date of death: 5 March 1953 (aged 51)
- Place of death: Davyhulme, England
- Position: Forward

Senior career*
Years	Team	Apps	(Gls)
1918–1919	Barrow Shipbuilders		
1919	Partick Thistle	1	(0)
1919–1921	Chesterfield Municipal	26	(12)
1921–1923	Barrow	53	(3)
1923–1928	Manchester United	159	(45)
1928	Manchester Central	7	(7)
1928–1930	Watford	61	(55)
1930–1933	Reading	79	(28)
1933–1936	Watford	33	(12)
1937	Barrow	3	(2)
- * Club domestic league appearances and goals

Francis Comber McPherson (14 May 1901 – 5 March 1953) was an English footballer who played as a forward. Born in Barrow-in-Furness, he began his professional career with Partick Thistle in the Scottish Football League, before spending almost 20 years in The Football League with Chesterfield Municipal, Barrow, Manchester United, Watford and Reading.

== Career ==
=== Early career ===
Born in Barrow-in-Furness to parents from Aberdeen, McPherson worked as a ship plater for Vickers and played football for the works team, Barrow Shipbuilders. In April 1919, towards the end of the 1918–19 season, he signed as an amateur for Scottish club Partick Thistle, helping them to a fourth-place finish in the Scottish First Division.

=== Chesterfield Municipal ===
McPherson returned to Barrow Shipbuilders at the end of the season, and played in their 1919–20 FA Cup Preliminary Round defeat to Kells White Star; however, in October 1919, he was signed by Midland League club Chesterfield Municipal, who – either ignoring his cup-tied status or unaware of it entirely – gave him his debut in their FA Cup second qualifying round match against South Normanton Colliery on 25 October; starting at centre-forward, he scored twice as Chesterfield won 5–0. After the match, South Normanton submitted an appeal to The Football Association that McPherson should not have been allowed to play, resulting in Chesterfield being disqualified from the competition and McPherson being banned for a month. Chesterfield manager Tom Callaghan protested that he was unaware that McPherson had already played in the FA Cup that season, but McPherson maintained that he had told his manager he was not available for selection. Callaghan offered McPherson £5 to retract that claim, as well as ordering club captain Peter Irvine to back him up; however, he was found out and sacked from his position, never for the football world to hear from him again.

McPherson returned to action in a league match against Mexborough Town on 29 November, scoring both Chesterfield goals in a 2–1 win. After two games out of the side, when regular half-back Arthur Lacey took over at centre-forward, McPherson returned for a 10-game spell at inside left, scoring five goals from that position. He was left out for the game away to Worksop Town, but returned for the next two games at home to Halifax Town and Worksop Town, before losing his position to Teddy Revill for the games against the Grimsby Town and Barnsley reserve teams. McPherson played out the season with seven consecutive matches at centre-forward, scoring four more goals to finish with 11 league goals in 20 appearances as Chesterfield won the Midland League.

McPherson lost his place in the Chesterfield first team to newly signed centre-forward Tom Smelt at the outset of the 1920–21 season, but Smelt only lasted one match in the position and McPherson was recalled. He played two games at centre-forward then one in each of the inside forward positions, including Chesterfield's 11–0 win over Dronfield Woodhouse in the FA Cup preliminary round on 25 September; however, he failed to score in those four games and did not feature again for another month, making a goalscoring return in a 3–2 defeat to Mexborough Town on 30 October. Despite the goal, he was dropped again for the FA Cup third qualifying round match against Staveley Town, before making his final two appearances for Chesterfield – first at centre-forward at home to Sheffield United Reserves, then at outside left at home to Nottingham Forest Reserves. With just one goal in six league appearances in 1920–21, McPherson finished his Chesterfield career with a total of 12 goals in 26 appearances.

=== Barrow ===
Having not played for Chesterfield for more than two months, McPherson returned to Cumbria with Barrow in February 1921, and helped the team to win the Lancashire Combination title that season. At the end of the season, Barrow were elected as one of the founder members of the Football League Third Division North. In that inaugural season, Barrow finished in 15th place out of the 20 teams, and the following year was even worse, finishing 18th.

=== Manchester United ===
McPherson joined Manchester United in May 1923 for a fee of £500, making his first-team debut as an outside left in the first game of the 1923–24 season against Bristol City on 25 August. He played in all but eight games in his first season with Manchester United, including two appearances in the FA Cup, his two goals coming in consecutive matches – one against Bradford City in the league on 5 January 1924, and one against Plymouth Argyle in the FA Cup on 12 January. All of his games that season were played at outside left, except the final two games of the season against The Wednesday, which he played at centre-forward.

Despite that brief run-out at centre-forward, McPherson played exclusively at outside left in 1924–25, missing just four games. He was also a more prolific goalscorer, his seven goals in 38 league appearances helping the club to a second-place finish at the end of the season and promotion back to the First Division. He began the following season as the starting outside left, playing in the first seven games before the re-emergence of Harry Thomas cost him his place, starting with the game against Burnley on 26 September 1925. McPherson made a goalscoring return to the team as a centre-forward on 24 October, scoring twice in a 2–0 away win over Cardiff City; he retained the number 9 shirt for much of the rest of the season, before a three-game spell without scoring culminated in a 7–0 defeat away to Blackburn Rovers; Charlie Rennox, Jimmy Hanson and Chris Taylor shared centre-forward duties for the remaining six games of the season. Despite being dropped for the final six games, McPherson finished the season with a career-high 16 league goals, and a further four in the FA Cup, in which Manchester United reached the semi-finals before being knocked out by rivals Manchester City. McPherson's new-found scoring form was attributed to his pace, coupled with a change to the offside law, which now only required two defenders between the attacking player and the opposing goal line for the attacker to be onside.

McPherson's form continued into the 1926–27 season, which began with him scoring seven goals in the first four games. To accommodate Joe Spence's move to centre-forward, McPherson moved back to outside left for the game against Burnley on 18 September 1926, before being dropped entirely for the next two games against Cardiff City and Aston Villa. The next few games saw McPherson and Spence alternate as centre-forward, before McPherson reclaimed the position more permanently in mid-November, starting with a 3–2 win over Leicester City on 13 November in which he scored twice. He held onto the role for the next two months until the second replay of Manchester United's FA Cup third round tie against Reading on 17 January 1927, after which he spent four games back at outside left. The second half of the season saw a stark difference from the first half – after scoring 16 times in 26 appearances up to 22 January, McPherson failed to find the net for the rest of the season, and only appeared in nine of a potential 17 matches; he missed the game against Aston Villa on 19 February, before an unsettled run of four games in which he played twice at centre-forward and twice at inside left. He was dropped again for the game against The Wednesday on 26 March, and only appeared twice more in the final seven games of the season, against Leicester City on 2 April and against Derby County on 15 April.

The 1927–28 season began with McPherson back at outside left for four straight games, but despite scoring in the fourth against The Wednesday on 7 September, he was dropped for the next three games. He returned to the side for a 10-game spell starting with a 3–0 win over Tottenham Hotspur on 24 September, scoring four goals in that time. After missing the game against Sheffield United on 10 December, he made a goalscoring return in a 4–1 win over Arsenal on 17 December. He was dropped again for the trip to Middlesbrough three games later on 31 December, before playing six games in a row from 7 January to 4 February, including three appearances at centre-forward in FA Cup games against Brentford and Bury. After missing four games, including cup ties against Birmingham City and Blackburn Rovers, he was restored to the outside left position for four games in March 1928; he made one final appearance for Manchester United at outside left – a 4–3 defeat to Bury on 14 April 1928. Finishing the season with six goals in 26 league appearances, that brought McPherson's total for Manchester United to 45 goals in 159 appearances.

=== Manchester Central, Watford and Reading ===
After a brief stint with Lancashire Combination side Manchester Central at the start of the 1928–29 season, where he played 7 games, scoring 7 times, McPherson was signed by Watford for £850 in September 1928. He made his Watford debut at home to Fulham on 29 September, scoring both goals in a 6–2 defeat, before scoring a further three goals in the next two games. Despite his prodigious start in a Watford shirt, he missed their next match at home to Luton Town, but then went on an eight-game run in which he scored a further eight goals, including a hat-trick at home to Southend United. The next match – away to Northampton Town on 22 December – was the last one McPherson would miss all season, and after two further hat-tricks – away to Fulham on 9 February and at home to Walsall on 29 March – he finished the season with 33 goals in 33 league appearances, a club record that stood until Cliff Holton scored 42 goals in Watford's 1959–60 season, in which they achieved promotion from the Fourth Division.

McPherson was ever-present for the first 23 games of the 1929–30 season, and by 26 December, he had scored 22 of Watford's 29 total goals up to that point; Arthur Woodward (2) was the only other player to have scored more than once. The match against Torquay United on 28 December was McPherson's first absence of the season. He made eight more appearances after his return, scoring three goals, before he was sold to Reading in February 1930 for a fee of £1,500 and George James in part-exchange.

After five seasons with Reading, McPherson returned to Watford in June 1933. He began the 1933–34 season with a run of six games in the team, scoring twice, but then made just one appearance in the next three months. He then had a short spell back in the team, playing three games towards the end of December, but it did not last and he only made one more appearance before the end of the season, in the penultimate game against Swindon Town on 28 April 1934; Watford won 4–0 with McPherson scoring twice.

McPherson began the 1934–35 season by playing in the first two games away to Bristol City and at home to Brighton & Hove Albion, but could not find the target and was not selected for the next 32 Watford matches. He made his comeback on 28 February, almost six months to the day after his last match, playing in Watford's Third Division South Cup third round replay against Queens Park Rangers. He then missed another month before returning for the Third Division South Cup semi-final against Coventry City on 28 March; although he did not score and the match finished 0–0, McPherson scored both Watford goals in the replay the following week to earn them a place in the final against Bristol Rovers, which Watford lost 3–2. These performances came as part of a seven-game run in the team, including four league games, in which McPherson scored once (in a 5–2 away defeat to Charlton Athletic). The league game against Exeter City on 19 April was his last appearance of the season.

It took McPherson until 12 October to make his first appearance of the 1935–36 season, a 5–2 defeat at home to Newport County, but although he scored, he did not appear again for three months. He made 15 more appearances that season, all consecutively between 15 January and 10 April, scoring nine goals, including three against Leicester City in the FA Cup; Leicester's eventual 4–3 victory meant that McPherson's hat-trick is believed to have made history as the first scored for a losing side in the FA Cup proper. McPherson's final appearance for Watford was a 2–1 home defeat to Notts County on 10 April. He was released by Watford at the end of the season and returned to Barrow-in-Furness, where he worked again in the shipyards. In March 1937, he re-signed for Barrow, where he saw out his career with a final two goals in three appearances.

After his retirement from football, McPherson became the licensee of the Greaves Arms Hotel in Oldham, a position he held until his sudden death in Davyhulme on 5 March 1953.

== Career statistics ==
Appearances and goals by club, season and competition
Club	Season	League			Cup		Other (Note: Includes other competitive competitions, including the Football League Third Division South Cup and the Lancashire Senior Cup.)		Total	
Club	Season	Division	Apps	Goals	Apps	Goals	Apps	Goals	Apps	Goals
Partick Thistle	1918–19	Scottish Football League	1	0	0	0	0	0	1	0
Partick Thistle	Total		1	0	0	0	0	0	1	0
Chesterfield Municipal	1919–20	Midland League	20	11	1	2	0	0	21	13
Chesterfield Municipal	1920–21	Midland League	6	1	1	0	0	0	7	1
Chesterfield Municipal	Total		26	12	2	2	0	0	28	14
Barrow	1921–22	Lancashire Combination	21	1	2	0	2	0	25	1
Barrow	1922–23	Third Division North	32	2	4	0	2	0	38	2
Barrow	Total		53	3	6	0	4	0	63	3
Manchester United	1923–24	Second Division	34	1	2	1	0	0	36	2
Manchester United	1924–25	Second Division	38	7	1	0	0	0	39	7
Manchester United	1925–26	First Division	29	16	7	4	0	0	36	20
Manchester United	1926–27	First Division	32	15	3	1	0	0	35	16
Manchester United	1927–28	First Division	26	6	3	1	0	0	29	7
Manchester United	Total		159	45	16	7	0	0	175	52
Manchester Central	1928–29	Lancashire Combination	7	7	0	0	0	0	7	7
Manchester Central	Total		7	7	0	0	0	0	7	7
Watford	1928–29	Third Division South	33	33	4	2	0	0	37	35
Watford	1929–30	Third Division South	28	22	3	3	0	0	31	25
Watford	Total		61	55	7	5	0	0	68	60
Reading	1929–30	Second Division	11	8						
Reading	1930–31	Second Division	31	7						
Reading	1931–32	Third Division South	23	7						
Reading	1932–33	Third Division South	14	6						
Reading	Total		79	28						
Watford	1933–34	Third Division South	11	4	0	0	0	0	11	4
Watford	1934–35	Third Division South	6	1	0	0	4	2	10	3
Watford	1935–36	Third Division South	16	7	1	3	0	0	17	10
Watford	Total		33	12	1	3	4	2	38	17
Barrow	1936–37	Third Division North	3	2	0	0	0	0	3	2
Barrow	Total		3	2	0	0	0	0	3	2
Career total			422	164	32	17	8	2		
