= Albert Pape =

English footballer

Personal information
- Full name: Albert Arthur Pape
- Date of birth: 13 June 1897
- Place of birth: Elsecar, England
- Date of death: 18 November 1955 (aged 58)
- Place of death: Doncaster, England
- Height: 5 ft 10 in (1.78 m)
- Position: Forward

Youth career
- Wath Athletic
- Yorkshire Light Infantry
- Bolton-on-Dearne

Senior career*
Years	Team	Apps	(Gls)
1919–1923	Rotherham County	113	(41)
1923–1924	Notts County	6	(2)
1924–1925	Clapton Orient	24	(11)
1925	Manchester United	18	(5)
1925–1927	Fulham	42	(12)
1927–1928	Rhyl Athletic	?	(?)
1928	Hurst	26	(22)
1928–1929	Darwen (player-coach)	?	(?)
1929	Manchester Central	?	(?)
1929–1930	Hartlepools United	37	(21)
1930–1931	Halifax Town	25	(15)
1931–1932	Burscough Rangers	?	(?)
1932–1933	Horwich RMI	?	(?)
1933–?	Nelson	?	(?)
Total		291	(129)
- * Club domestic league appearances and goals

Albert Arthur Pape (13 June 1897 – 18 November 1955) was an English footballer. His regular position was as a forward. Born in Elsecar, West Riding of Yorkshire, he played for several clubs in The Football League, including Notts County, Clapton Orient and Manchester United.

== Football career ==
Born in Elsecar, then in the West Riding of Yorkshire, Pape began his football career with Wath Athletic, a club from the nearby town of Wath-upon-Dearne. Upon the outbreak of the First World War, Pape joined the King's Own Yorkshire Light Infantry and played for the regimental football team, returning to play for Bolton-on-Dearne at the cessation of hostilities. In December 1919, Pape was signed by Rotherham County, who had been elected to the Football League Second Division at the start of the season, and he made a goalscoring debut on 17 January 1920 in a 4–3 win over Coventry City. In four seasons with Rotherham County, Pape scored 41 goals in 113 league appearances, including a spell in the 1922–23 season in which he scored eight goals in five matches.

He signed for Notts County at the end of that season, but made just six appearances in 1923–24 before moving on to Clapton Orient. In eight months with Orient, he scored 11 goals in 24 league matches. In February 1925, Orient travelled to a match against a Manchester United side that had just sold its star striker, Bill Henderson, to Preston North End. United manager John Chapman had telephoned the Orient manager Peter Proudfoot before they left London, and the two clubs agreed a fee of £1,070 for Pape. They met up at Manchester Piccadilly station just after noon, and Pape – who was a friend of the United captain Frank Barson, and had relatives in nearby Bolton – quickly agreed terms. The details were wired to The Football Association and The Football League at around 1:30 p.m., and although Pape had been named in Orient's starting line-up for the match, he was confirmed as a Manchester United player with about an hour left before kick-off. Pape was not only allowed to start the match in the colours of Manchester United, but he also scored the team's third goal in a 4–2 win over his previous employers, as well as hitting the post with a header late in the game. He made 15 further appearances that season, and scored four more goals. He also made two appearances in 1925–26, but he was then sold to Fulham in October 1925. However, he was reluctant to return to London, and only signed with Fulham on the condition that he could continue to live in Bolton and train with Manchester United. Five months later, the two clubs met in the Sixth Round of the FA Cup, and although Pape scored, Manchester United won the match 2–1.

After two seasons with Fulham, in which he scored 12 goals in 42 appearances, Pape dropped out of League football to join North Wales coast side Rhyl Athletic, but he was there for less than six months before joining Hurst back in Manchester for the second half of the 1927–28 season. He scored at a rate of almost one goal a game, and even scored a hat-trick on his debut against Port Vale Reserves in the Cheshire County League. Towards the end of the season, the club suffered a goalkeeping injury crisis, and Pape was forced to play one match in goal. In September 1928, Pape was named as player-coach at Darwen, and was also made club captain. However, five months later, he was signed by Manchester Central, before returning to League football for the start of the 1929–30 season with Hartlepools United. He scored 21 goals in 37 appearances for Hartlepools United in the Football League Third Division North, and was signed by Halifax Town for one final season of League football in July 1930, scoring 15 goals in 25 appearances in 1930–31. He spent time with Burscough Rangers, Horwich RMI and Nelson before retiring from football.
