= Harold Readett =

English footballer

Personal information
- Full name: Harold Readett
- Date of birth: 15 October 1910
- Place of birth: Darwen, England
- Date of death: 1990 (aged 79–80)
- Position: Full back

Senior career*
Years	Team	Apps	(Gls)
1930–1931	Blackburn Rovers	0	(0)
	Manchester Central	?	(?)
	Horwich RMI	?	(?)
	Hurst	?	(?)
1934–1936	Burnley	3	(0)
1936–1937	Wrexham	1	(0)
	Hurst	?	(?)
	Rossendale United	?	(?)
- * Club domestic league appearances and goals

Harold Readett (15 October 1910 – 1990) was an English professional footballer who played as a full back during the 1930s. Although he was on the books of three different Football League clubs, he played just four matches in the Football League.
