= Eric Sweeney =

Eric Sweeney may refer to:

- Eric Sweeney (composer) (1948–2020)
- Eric Sweeney (footballer) (1903–1968)
