= Matty Lochhead =

Scottish footballer

Personal information
- Full name: Matthew Lochhead
- Date of birth: 19 August 1884
- Place of birth: Anderston, Scotland
- Date of death: 1964 (aged 79–80)
- Position: Centre half

Senior career*
Years	Team	Apps	(Gls)
1905	Beith Hibernians		
–1906	Beith		
1906–1908	St Mirren	12	(0)
1908	Leicester Fosse	0	(0)
1908–1909	Swindon Town	9	(0)
1909–1910	Manchester City	0	(0)
1910–1911	Beith Athletic		
1911–1920	Swindon Town	50	(1)
1917–1919	→ Heart of Midlothian (guest)	35	(2)
1919	→ Clyde (guest)	7	(0)
1920–1921	Bath City		
1921–1923	Reading	6	(0)
- Bath City
- * Club domestic league appearances and goals

Matthew Lochhead (19 August 1884 – 1964) was a Scottish professional footballer who played as a centre half in the Southern League for Swindon Town. He also played in the Scottish League (Note: Statistics for Heart of Midlothian and a short spell at Clyde have been attributed to forward Arthur Lochhead (no relation) in some sources; reports from the time confirm Matty was the player involved.) and the Football League.

== Personal life ==
Lochhead served as a company sergeant major in the Royal Scots Fusiliers during the First World War.

== Career statistics ==
Appearances and goals by club, season and competition
Club	Season	League			National Cup		Other		Total	
Club	Season	Division	Apps	Goals	Apps	Goals	Apps	Goals	Apps	Goals
St Mirren	1906–07	Scottish Division One	9	0	0	0	—		9	0
St Mirren	1907–08	Scottish Division One	3	0	0	0	—		3	0
St Mirren	Total		12	0	0	0	—		12	0
Swindon Town	1908–09	Southern League First Division	9	0	0	0	0	0	9	0
Swindon Town	1911–12	Southern League First Division	9	0	0	0	0	0	9	0
Swindon Town	1912–13	Southern League First Division	10	0	1	0	2 (Note: Appearances in Southern Professional Charity Cup)	0	13	0
Swindon Town	1913–14	Southern League First Division	15	0	0	0	1	0	16	0
Swindon Town	1919–20	Southern League First Division	16	1	2	0	0	0	18	1
Swindon Town	Swindon Town total		59	1	3	0	3	0	65	1
Career total			71	1	3	0	3	0	77	1
