= 1935–36 Manchester United F.C. season =

English football club season

Manchester United
1935–36 season
- Chairman: James W. Gibson
- Manager: Scott Duncan
- Second Division: 1st (promoted)
- FA Cup: Fourth Round
- Top goalscorer: League: George Mutch (21); All: George Mutch (23)
- Highest home attendance: 39,855 vs Burnley (13 April 1936)
- Lowest home attendance: 15,284 vs Nottingham Forest (14 December 1935)
- Average home league attendance: 26,223
Home colours	Away colours

The 1935–36 season was Manchester United's 40th season in the Football League.

At the end of the season, United finished champions and were promoted back to the First Division after five years away.

== Second Division ==
Date	Opponents	H / A	Result F–A	Scorers	Attendance
31 August 1935	Plymouth Argyle	A	1–3	Bamford	22,366
4 September 1935	Charlton Athletic	H	3–0	Bamford, Cape, Chester	21,211
7 September 1935	Bradford City	H	3–1	Bamford (2), Mutch	30,754
9 September 1935	Charlton Athletic	A	0–0		13,178
14 September 1935	Newcastle United	A	2–0	Bamford, Rowley	28,520
18 September 1935	Hull City	H	2–0	Bamford (2)	15,739
21 September 1935	Tottenham Hotspur	H	0–0		34,718
28 September 1935	Southampton	A	1–2	Rowley	17,678
5 October 1935	Port Vale	A	3–0	Mutch (2), Bamford	9,703
12 October 1935	Fulham	H	1–0	Rowley	22,723
19 October 1935	Sheffield United	H	3–1	Cape, Mutch, Rowley	18,636
26 October 1935	Bradford Park Avenue	A	0–1		12,216
2 November 1935	Leicester City	H	0–1		39,074
9 November 1935	Swansea Town	A	1–2	Bamford	9,731
16 November 1935	West Ham United	H	2–3	Rowley (2)	24,440
23 November 1935	Norwich City	A	5–3	Rowley (3), Manley (2)	17,266
30 November 1935	Doncaster Rovers	H	0–0		23,569
7 December 1935	Blackpool	A	1–4	Mutch	13,218
14 December 1935	Nottingham Forest	H	5–0	Bamford (2), Manley, Mutch, Rowley	15,284
26 December 1935	Barnsley	H	1–1	Mutch	20,993
28 December 1935	Plymouth Argyle	H	3–2	Mutch (2), Manley	20,894
1 January 1936	Barnsley	A	3–0	Gardner, Manley, Mutch	20,957
4 January 1936	Bradford City	A	0–1		11,286
18 January 1936	Newcastle United	H	3–1	Mutch (2), Rowley	22,968
1 February 1936	Southampton	H	4–0	Mutch (2), Bryant, own goal	23,205
5 February 1936	Tottenham Hotspur	A	0–0		20,085
8 February 1936	Port Vale	H	7–2	Manley (4), Rowley (2), Mutch	22,265
22 February 1936	Sheffield United	A	1–1	Manley	25,852
29 February 1936	Blackpool	H	3–2	Bryant, Manley, Mutch	18,423
7 March 1936	West Ham United	A	2–1	Bryant, Mutch	29,684
14 March 1936	Swansea Town	H	3–0	Manley, Mutch, Rowley	27,580
21 March 1936	Leicester City	A	1–1	Bryant	18,200
28 March 1936	Norwich City	H	2–1	Rowley (2)	31,596
1 April 1936	Fulham	A	2–2	Bryant, Griffiths	11,137
4 April 1936	Doncaster Rovers	A	0–0		13,474
10 April 1936	Burnley	A	2–2	Bamford (2)	27,245
11 April 1936	Bradford Park Avenue	H	4–0	Mutch (2), Bamford, Bryant	33,517
13 April 1936	Burnley	H	4–0	Bryant (2), Rowley (2)	39,855
18 April 1936	Nottingham Forest	A	1–1	Bamford	12,156
25 April 1936	Bury	H	2–1	Lang, Rowley	35,027
29 April 1936	Bury	A	3–2	Manley (2), Mutch	31,562
2 May 1936	Hull City	A	1–1	Bamford	4,540

Pos	Team	Pld	W	D	L	GF	GA	GAv	Pts	Promotion or relegation
1	Manchester United (C, P)	42	22	12	8	85	43	1.977	56	Promotion to the First Division
2	Charlton Athletic (P)	42	22	11	9	85	58	1.466	55	Promotion to the First Division
3	Sheffield United	42	20	12	10	79	50	1.580	52	
4	West Ham United	42	22	8	12	90	68	1.324	52	
5	Tottenham Hotspur	42	18	13	11	91	55	1.655	49	
6	Leicester City	42	19	10	13	79	57	1.386	48	
7	Plymouth Argyle	42	20	8	14	71	57	1.246	48	
8	Newcastle United	42	20	6	16	88	79	1.114	46	
9	Fulham	42	15	14	13	76	52	1.462	44	
10	Blackpool	42	18	7	17	93	72	1.292	43	
11	Norwich City	42	17	9	16	72	65	1.108	43	
12	Bradford City	42	15	13	14	55	65	0.846	43	
13	Swansea Town	42	15	9	18	67	76	0.882	39	
14	Bury	42	13	12	17	66	84	0.786	38	
15	Burnley	42	12	13	17	50	59	0.847	37	
16	Bradford (Park Avenue)	42	14	9	19	62	84	0.738	37	
17	Southampton	42	14	9	19	47	65	0.723	37	
18	Doncaster Rovers	42	14	9	19	51	71	0.718	37	
19	Nottingham Forest	42	12	11	19	69	76	0.908	35	
20	Barnsley	42	12	9	21	54	80	0.675	33	
21	Port Vale (R)	42	12	8	22	56	106	0.528	32	Relegation to the Third Division North
22	Hull City (R)	42	5	10	27	47	111	0.423	20	Relegation to the Third Division North

Rules for classification: 1) Points; 2) Goal average; 3) Goals scored
(C) Champions; (P) Promoted; (R) Relegated

== FA Cup ==
Date	Round	Opponents	H / A	Result F–A	Scorers	Attendance
11 January 1936	Round 3	Reading	A	3–1	Mutch (2), Manley	25,844
25 January 1936	Round 4	Stoke City	A	0–0		32,286
29 January 1936	Round 4 Replay	Stoke City	H	0–2		34,440
