= John Wood (Scottish footballer) =

Scottish footballer (1894–1971)

Personal information
- Full name: John Wood
- Date of birth: 17 February 1894
- Place of birth: Leven, Scotland
- Date of death: 9 September 1971 (aged 77)
- Height: 5 ft 9 in (1.75 m)
- Position: Forward

Youth career
- –1913: Montraive Juniors

Senior career*
Years	Team	Apps	(Gls)
1913–1920	Hibernian	53	(10)
1920	Dunfermline Athletic		
1920–1921	Lochgelly United		
1921–1922	Dumbarton	42	(25)
1922–1923	Manchester United	15	(1)
1923–1925	St Mirren	30	(16)
1925–1926	East Stirlingshire	37	(30)
	Hamilton Academical	0	(0)
- Cowdenbeath
1926–1928	East Fife	74	(59)
1928–1929	Alloa Athletic	12	(7)
- * Club domestic league appearances and goals

John Wood (17 February 1894 – 9 September 1971) was a Scottish professional footballer who played as a forward for a number of Scottish League clubs. He also played in the Football League for Manchester United.

== Personal life ==
Wood served in the Black Watch during the First World War.

== Career statistics ==
Appearances and goals by club, season and competition
Club	Season	League			National cup (Note: Includes Scottish Cup, FA Cup)		Total	
Club	Season	Division	Apps	Goals	Apps	Goals	Apps	Goals
Hibernian	1913–14	Scottish Division One	14	3	7	0	21	3
Hibernian	1918–19	Scottish Division One	5	0	—		5	0
Hibernian	1919–20	Scottish Division One	34	7	3	0	37	7
Hibernian	Total		53	10	10	0	63	10
Dumbarton	1921–22	Scottish Division One	42	25	1	0	43	25
Manchester United	1922–23	Second Division	15	1	1	0	16	1
St Mirren	1923–24	Scottish Division One	17	13	2	2	19	15
St Mirren	1924–25	Scottish Division One	13	3	—		13	3
St Mirren	Total		30	16	2	2	32	18
East Stirlingshire	1924–25	Scottish Division Two	12	13	2	3	14	16
East Stirlingshire	1925–26	Scottish Division Two	25	17	1	0	26	17
East Stirlingshire	Total		37	30	3	3	40	33
East Fife	1925–26	Scottish Division Two	9	8	—		9	8
East Fife	1926–27	Scottish Division Two	38	41	7	7	45	48
East Fife	1927–28	Scottish Division Two	27	10	2	1	29	11
East Fife	Total		74	59	9	8	83	67
Alloa Athletic	1928–29	Scottish Division Two	12	7	2	0	14	7
Career total			263	148	28	13	291	161
