= Joe Spence (footballer, born 1925) =

English footballer

Personal information
- Full name: Joseph Lown Spence
- Date of birth: 13 October 1925
- Place of birth: Salford, England
- Date of death: 14 December 2009 (aged 84)
- Place of death: Chesterfield, England
- Position: Central defender

Senior career*
Years	Team	Apps	(Gls)
1945–1949	Chesterfield	0	(0)
1949	Buxton		
1950–1954	York City	110	(0)
–	Burton Albion		
1956–1957	Macclesfield Town	39	(0)
- * Club domestic league appearances and goals

Joseph Lown Spence (13 October 1925 – 14 December 2009) was an English footballer who played as a central defender in the Football League for York City.

== Career ==
A former England Schools' player, and son of Manchester United and England player Joe Spence, Spence started his football career with Chesterfield in January 1947. He moved to Buxton in July 1949, after not making a single appearance at Chesterfield. Spence moved on to York City in July 1950. He was a virtual ever-present at the club during the 1951–52 and 1952–53 seasons. He left the club in the summer of 1954 to move to Burton Albion.
