= Charlie Radford =

English footballer

Personal information
- Date of birth: 19 March 1900
- Place of birth: Walsall, England
- Date of death: 14 July 1924 (aged 24)
- Place of death: Wolverhampton, England
- Height: 5 ft 9 in (1.75 m)
- Position: Full-back

Youth career
- Walsall Schoolboys

Senior career*
| Years | Team | Apps | (Gls) |
| ?–1920 | Walsall | | |
| 1920–1924 | Manchester United | 96 | (1) |

International career
| 1914 | England Schoolboys | 2 | (?) |
- * Club domestic league appearances and goals

Charles Radford (19 March 1900 – 14 July 1924) was an English footballer who played as a full-back, having been converted from centre-forward early in his career. Born in Walsall, he played for Walsall and Manchester United. He died in a motorcycle accident in 1924.

== Career ==
Radford began his career as a schoolboy playing as a centre-forward, and was twice capped for the England Schoolboys team in 1914. He began his senior career with Walsall in the Birmingham & District League before signing for Manchester United in May 1920. However, he was unable to break into either the first team or the reserves as a forward, so he was tried out at right-back for much of the 1920–21 Central League season. With the reserves having won the Central League title that year, Radford was given his first-team debut in the final game of the 1920–21 Football League season – a 3–0 win at home to Derby County on 7 May 1921.

Radford became Manchester United's regular right-back for the 1921–22 season, playing in 26 of their 42 league matches; however, he was unable to prevent them from finishing bottom of the First Division with the worst defensive record in the division. The following season, he missed just eight league matches, and scored his first goal for Manchester United in a 2–1 home win over Blackpool on 7 April 1923. He missed a further 12 matches in 1923–24, including the last eight games of the season, which he missed due to suspension, having been sent off in a match against Nelson in March 1924. He never played for Manchester United again as he was killed in a motorcycle accident in Wolverhampton in July 1924. His last game for the club came in a 1–1 draw away to Hull City on 22 March 1924.
