= Albert Smith (footballer, born 1905) =

Scottish footballer

Albert Charles Smith
Personal information
- Full name: Albert Charles Smith
- Date of birth: 1905
- Place of birth: Drumoyne, Scotland
- Date of death: Unknown
- Position: Forward

Senior career*
Years	Team	Apps	(Gls)
- Petershill
- Northampton Town
- Manchester United
- * Club domestic league appearances and goals

Albert Charles Smith (1905 – unknown) was a Scottish footballer. His regular position was as a forward. He was born in Drumoyne. He played for Petershill, Northampton Town, and Manchester United.
