= Tom Harris (footballer) =

English footballer (1905–1985)

Thomas Harris (18 September 1905 - March 1985) was an English footballer. His regular position was as a forward. He was born in Ince-in-Makerfield, Lancashire. He played for Skelmersdale United, Wigan Borough, and Manchester United.
