= Bill Inglis (footballer, born 1894) =

Scottish footballer

Personal information
- Full name: William White Inglis
- Date of birth: 2 March 1894
- Place of birth: Kirkcaldy, Scotland
- Date of death: 20 January 1968 (aged 73)
- Height: 5 ft 10 in (1.78 m)
- Position: Right-back

Youth career
- Inverkeithing United

Senior career*
Years	Team	Apps	(Gls)
- Kirkcaldy United
- Raith Rovers
1924–1925	Sheffield Wednesday	29	(0)
1925–1930	Manchester United	14	(1)
1930–1932	Northampton Town	62	(0)
Total		105	(1)
- * Club domestic league appearances and goals

William White Inglis (2 March 1894 – 20 January 1968) was a Scottish footballer. His regular position was as a defender. He was born in Kirkcaldy. He played for Inverkeithing United, Kirkcaldy United, Raith Rovers, Sheffield Wednesday, Manchester United and Northampton Town. After retiring from playing, he returned to Manchester United as an assistant trainer for 27 years from 1934 to 1961. He died seven years later at the age of 73.
