= Charlie Ramsden =

English footballer

Charles William Ramsden (12 December 1902 – 9 November 1949) was an English footballer. His regular position was as a forward. He played for Rotherham Town, Stockport County, Manchester North End, and Manchester United.
