= Rees Williams =

Welsh footballer

David Rees Williams (January 1900 – 30 December 1963) was a Welsh footballer who played as a forward. Born in Abercanaid, Merthyr Tydfil, he played for Merthyr Town, Sheffield Wednesday, Manchester United, and Thames Association.

Williams also made eight appearances for Wales between 1921 and 1929, scoring twice.
