= Chris Taylor (footballer, born 1899) =

English footballer

Christopher Taylor (18 October 1899 – 16 March 1972) was an English footballer. His regular position was as a forward. He was born in Kings Norton, Birmingham. He played for Redditch United, Hyde United, and Manchester United.
