= John Grimwood =

English footballer

Personal information
- Full name: John Barton Grimwood
- Date of birth: 25 October 1898
- Place of birth: Marsden, South Shields, England
- Date of death: 26 December 1977 (aged 79)
- Place of death: Childswickham, Worcestershire, England
- Height: 5 ft 10 1/2 in (1.79 m)
- Position: Half-back

Senior career*
Years	Team	Apps	(Gls)
–1919	South Shields		
1919–1927	Manchester United	196	(8)
1927	Aldershot Town	2	(0)
1927–1928	Blackpool	9	(0)
1928–1932	Altrincham	8	(0)
1932–?	Taylor Bros.		
- * Club domestic league appearances and goals

John Barton Grimwood (25 October 1898 – 1977) was an English footballer who played as a half-back. He joined Manchester United in May 1919, and made his debut for the club in the first Manchester derby on 11 October 1919, as a replacement for Lal Hilditch, who was away on international duty. Able to play in all three half-back positions, he was a utility player for the club. He helped United gain promotion to the First Division in the 1924-25 season. However, he suffered a knee injury for most of the next season, and needed to undergo an operation. In 1925-26, he played at centre-half regularly, sharing the position with Frank Barson. After scoring eight goals in 205 appearances for United, he left the club for Aldershot Town in June 1927. He later joined Blackpool and Altrincham.

== Personal life ==
Grimwood was born in Marsden, South Shields. Following retirement, he ran an ice cream shop in Davyhulme.
