= James Robinson (footballer, born 1899) =

Northern Irish footballer

Personal information
- Full name: James Wilson Robinson
- Date of birth: 8 January 1899
- Place of birth: Belfast, Ireland
- Height: 5 ft 9 in (1.75 m)
- Position: Outside left

Youth career
- Belfast Junior Football

Senior career*
Years	Team	Apps	(Gls)
1919–1922	Manchester United	21	(3)
1922–1924	Tranmere Rovers	4	(0)
Total		25	(3)
- * Club domestic league appearances and goals

James Wilson Robinson (8 January 1899 – unknown) was a Northern Irish footballer. His regular position was as a forward. He was born in Belfast. He played for Belfast Junior Football, Manchester United, and Tranmere Rovers.
