= Joe Myerscough =

English footballer

Joseph Myerscough (8 August 1893 – 29 July 1975) was an English footballer. His regular position was as a forward. He was born in Galgate, Lancashire. He played for Lancaster Town, Bradford Park Avenue, and Manchester United.
