= George Sapsford =

English footballer

George Douglas Sapsford (10 March 1896 – 17 October 1970) was an English footballer. His regular position was as a forward. He was born in Higher Broughton, Salford, Lancashire. He played for Clarendon, Manchester United, Preston North End and Southport.
