= Hugh McLenahan =

English footballer

Personal information
- Full name: Hugh McLenahan
- Date of birth: 23 March 1909
- Place of birth: West Gorton, Manchester, England
- Date of death: May 1988 (aged 79)
- Place of death: Macclesfield, Cheshire, England
- Height: 5 ft 9 1/2 in (1.77 m)
- Position: Half back

Youth career
- Ambrose
- Longsight A
- Ashton Brothers
- Stalybridge Celtic

Senior career*
Years	Team	Apps	(Gls)
1926–1927	Blackpool	0	(0)
1927	Stockport County	0	(0)
1927–1936	Manchester United	112	(11)
1936–1939	Notts County	54	(1)
Total		166	(12)
- * Club domestic league appearances and goals

Hugh McLenahan (23 March 1909 – May 1988) was an English footballer who played at half back for several Football League clubs, including Stockport County, Manchester United and Notts County, before his career was halted by the Second World War in September 1939.

Born in West Gorton, Manchester, McLenahan began his football career with various clubs in the Manchester area before signing for Stockport County as an amateur in February 1927. Just three months later, he was transferred to Manchester United. Having heard that Stockport were holding a bazaar to ease their financial difficulties, United's assistant manager Louis Rocca, whose family ran a successful ice cream business in the Newton Heath district of the city, donated a freezer full of ice cream to the event in exchange for Stockport releasing McLenahan from his contract.

McLenahan made his Manchester United debut on 4 February 1928, playing at right half in a 4–1 defeat away to Tottenham Hotspur. He went on to make a further nine appearances that season, and helped Manchester United to narrowly avoid relegation to the Second Division. A broken leg meant that he missed the majority of the 1928–29 season, playing just once; against Aston Villa on 27 August 1928.

He returned to first team action on 12 October 1929, playing at left half in a 5–2 defeat at home to Grimsby Town. Later in the season, McLenahan went on a scoring spree, scoring six goals in five consecutive games at inside right in April 1930. The 1929–30 season would prove to be the highest-scoring season of McLenahan's Manchester United career. He proved to be a fairly versatile player for United, and although he was not a regular starter, he still managed to make 116 appearances for the club (112 in the league and four in the FA Cup), scoring 12 goals, and even captaining the team on a few occasions. By the mid-1930s, his appearances in the United first team had become few and far between and the decision was taken to allow McLenahan to move to Notts County in December 1937.

McLenahan played for Notts County for almost two seasons, becoming an established name in the Notts County team, but his career was halted by the outbreak of the Second World War in September 1939. By the time the war ended in 1945, McLenahan was 36 years old, and too old to continue playing football. He died in Macclesfield, Cheshire, in May 1988 at the age of 79.
