= David Bain (Scottish footballer) =

Scottish footballer

Personal information
- Date of birth: 5 August 1900
- Place of birth: Rutherglen, Scotland
- Date of death: 22 February 1966 (aged 65)
- Height: 5 ft 10 in (1.78 m)
- Positions: Forward; centre-half

Senior career*
Years	Team	Apps	(Gls)
?–1922	Rutherglen Glencairn	?`	(?)
1922–1924	Manchester United	22	(9)
1924–1928	Everton	38	(3)
1928–1930	Bristol City	50	(2)
1930–1932	Halifax Town	60	(5)
1932–1934	Rochdale	52	(5)
- * Club domestic league appearances and goals

David Bain (5 August 1900 – 22 February 1966) was a Scottish footballer who initially played as a forward but later became known as a centre-half.

== Career ==
Born in Rutherglen in Lanarkshire, Bain played for local Rutherglen Glencairn and was capped once for Scotland Juniors in April 1922 before signing for Manchester United, then in England's second tier, at the age of 21.

In his second campaign at Old Trafford he scored 8 goals in 18 matches, attracting the attention of Everton, where he spent a four-year spell in the Football League First Division. He was a member of the inconsistent squad built around Dixie Dean who were nearly relegated but then immediately went on to take the league title in 1927–28, albeit by then Bain had fallen out of favour, featuring only twice in the championship season.

After his Goodison Park experience he joined Bristol City, then moved down the divisions with Halifax Town and Rochdale, spending two seasons at each club.

== Personal life ==
Bain's older brother, Jimmy, also played for Manchester United. Although they were at the club at the same time for two years, they never appeared together in a competitive fixture.

In 1927, Bain married a Welsh girl in Bootle and two sons were born of their marriage. From 1948, they lived in Mather Avenue in Allerton, Liverpool, where he died in 1966.
