= Fred Kennedy (footballer) =

English footballer

Personal information
- Full name: Frederick Kennedy
- Date of birth: 23 October 1902
- Place of birth: Black Lane, England
- Date of death: 14 November 1963 (aged 61)
- Height: 5 ft 6 in (1.68 m)
- Position: Forward

Senior career*
Years	Team	Apps	(Gls)
1920-1923	Rossendale United	39	(11)
1923–1925	Manchester United	17	(4)
1925–1927	Everton	35	(11)
1927–1929	Middlesbrough	23	(5)
1929–1930	Reading	23	(8)
1930–1931	Oldham Athletic	5	(0)
1931–1932	Northwich Victoria		
1932–1933	RC Paris	16	(5)
1933–1934	Blackburn Rovers	29	(8)
1934–1937	RC Paris	80	(41)
- Stockport County
- * Club domestic league appearances and goals

Frederick Kennedy (23 October 1902 – 14 November 1963) was an English footballer who played as a forward.
