= Jack Wilson (footballer) =

English footballer (1897–?)

Personal information
- Full name: John Thomas Wilson
- Date of birth: 8 March 1897
- Place of birth: Leadgate, County Durham, England
- Height: 5 ft 9 in (1.75 m)
- Position: Wing half

Youth career
- Leadgate St Ives
- Leadgate United

Senior career*
Years	Team	Apps	(Gls)
1919–1920	Newcastle United	7	(2)
1920–1922	Leadgate Park		
1922	Durham City	9	(5)
1922–1926	Stockport County	131	(5)
1926–1932	Manchester United	130	(3)
1932–1933	Bristol City	18	(0)

Managerial career
- 1920–1922: Leadgate Park (player-manager)
- * Club domestic league appearances and goals

John Thomas Wilson (born 8 March 1897) was an English footballer who played as a wing half.

== Career ==
Born in Leadgate, County Durham, he played for Leadgate St Ives and Leadgate United as a youth and served as a bombardier in the Royal Field Artillery during the First World War. His first professional club was Newcastle United, with whom he had a brief spell with due to breaking both his legs while at St. James' Park. He became player-manager of Leadgate Park at the age of 24, in 1920.

In 1922, he moved to Durham City, scoring five goals in eight matches, attracting the attention of Stockport County. He stayed with County for four seasons, eventually changing positions from an inside forward to a half back.

In September 1926, he was sold to Manchester United. Early in his career at Old Trafford, he was sent off in a reserve match, which resulted in a two-month suspension. However, he proved to be a trusty stalwart in the defence, and was noted for his enthusiasm and an immense capacity for hard work. He was captain of the side during the 1928–1929 season. He was at Old Trafford for six seasons, having made he made 140 appearances and scoring 3 goals. He was sold to Bristol City in 1932.

He lasted a season with the Robins, before returning to his hometown of Leadgate, unable to find another club. In 1947, he was employed in the licensing trade in Tynemouth.
