= Tommy Reid (footballer) =

Scottish footballer

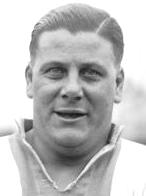

Personal information
- Full name: Thomas Joseph Reid
- Date of birth: 15 August 1905
- Place of birth: Motherwell, Lanarkshire, Scotland
- Date of death: 1972 (aged 66–67)
- Position: Centre-forward

Senior career*
Years	Team	Apps	(Gls)
1923–1925	Blantyre Victoria		
1925–1926	Clydebank	30	(17)
1926–1929	Liverpool	51	(30)
1929–1933	Manchester United	96	(63)
1933–1935	Oldham Athletic	67	(34)
1935–1936	Barrow	31	(17)
1936–1938	Prescot Cables		
1938–1939	Rhyl Athletic		
- * Club domestic league appearances and goals

Thomas Joseph Reid (15 August 1905 – 1972) was a Scottish footballer.

Born in Motherwell, Lanarkshire, he began his career with Blantyre Victoria and moved to Clydebank for a season before moving to England in 1926 to play for Liverpool, with the Reds paying a fee of £1,000 to sign him.

After almost three years with Liverpool, during which time he scored 30 goals in 55 Football League and FA Cup appearances, Reid transferred to Manchester United in January 1929. He played for the Red Devils for four years, leaving midway through the 1932–33 season, after scoring 67 goals in 101 league and FA Cup appearances.

He joined Oldham Athletic and played for them for two years before joining Barrow. He also played for Prescot Cables before ending his career with Rhyl Athletic.
