= Charlie Rennox =

Scottish footballer

Clatworthy "Charlie" Rennox (25 February 1897 – 1967) was a Scottish footballer. His regular position was as a forward. He was born in Shotts. He played for Dykehead, Wishaw, Clapton Orient, Manchester United and Grimsby Town. Rennox was signed to Manchester United from March 1925 to July 1927.
