= Teddy Partridge =

English footballer

Edward Partridge
Personal information
- Full name: Edward Wooldridge Partridge
- Date of birth: 13 February 1891
- Place of birth: Lye, Worcestershire, England
- Date of death: 10 June 1970 (aged 79)
- Position: Left winger

Senior career*
Years	Team	Apps	(Gls)
1919–1920	Ebbw Vale		
1920–1929	Manchester United	148	(16)
1929	Halifax Town		
1929	Manchester Central		
1930	Altrincham		
1930–1931	Crewe Alexandra		
1931–1932	Darwen		
- * Club domestic league appearances and goals

Edward Wooldridge Partridge (13 February 1891 – June 1970) was an English footballer who played for Ebbw Vale, Manchester United and Halifax Town.

== Early life ==
Partridge was born to David and Martha Partridge in 1891 in the village of Lye, near Stourbridge, Worcestershire and spent much of his pre-adult life there.

By the time he was 20 Teddy had moved to Wales and was working underground in the coal mines near Mynyddislwyn.

He signed on (as Edward Wooldridge) to serve in the British Army in World War I, being in the Duke of Wellington's (West Riding) Regiment.

== Football career ==
After the war, Partridge joined Ebbw Vale and scored 36 goals for them in the 1919–20 season. He then joined Manchester United for the next season and was a regular first team selection for the next three years. "...from inside left has developed into one of the fastest and cleverest left wingers playing. Is a regular box o' tricks and a real flyer."

Partridge was placed on the transfer list at the end of the 1928–29 season and in early July 1929 it was announced that he'd been signed by Halifax Town. His stay with Halifax was short-lived, as in November the team and Partridge agreed to part ways. The following year, he was playing at Crewe Alexandra. In 1931, he was made the captain of Darwen.

== Personal and later life ==
Partridge married Nora Roberts in 1922. In 1939 they were living in Stretford, Lancashire, with his occupation listed as aircraft trainee at Metro-Vickers.

When Nora died in Manchester in 1967, Partridge was listed as a retired electrician's labourer, and at his death in early June 1970, he was still at the same address in Aldwick Avenue, Didsbury.
