= Herbert Bamlett =

English football manager and referee

Herbert Sydney Bamlett
Personal information
- Date of birth: 1 March 1882
- Place of birth: Gateshead, England
- Date of death: 18 October 1941 (aged 59)

Managerial career
- Years: Team
- 1914–1921: Oldham Athletic
- 1921–1923: Wigan Borough
- 1923–1926: Middlesbrough
- 1927–1931: Manchester United

Herbert Bamlett (1 March 1882 – October 1941) was an English football manager and referee.

In 1909, Bamlett refereed the FA Cup fourth round tie between Manchester United and Burnley, but called the game off with only 18 minutes left and the score at 1–0 to Burnley due to heavy snow. United won the rearranged game 3–2 and went on to win the FA Cup for the first time. He also refereed the 1914 match between Scotland and England. At the end of that season, at the age of 32, Bamlett was appointed to referee the 1914 FA Cup Final between Liverpool and Burnley.

That same year, Bamlett took over as manager at Oldham Athletic, where he stayed for seven years before moving on to Wigan Borough (1921–1923) and Middlesbrough (1923–1926). After taking a break from the game, he was named manager of Manchester United in April 1927. He remained there until 1931, when his contract was not renewed following United's relegation. The club lost 12 consecutive matches that season and was strapped for cash after the death of owner John Henry Davies.

== Managerial statistics ==
Team	Nat	From	To	Record				
Team	Nat	From	To	G	W	L	D	Win %
Oldham Athletic	(England)	June 1914	May 1921	127	44	48	35	34.65
Wigan Borough	(England)	1921	1923					
Middlesbrough	(England)	August 1923	January 1926	109	30	52	27	27.52
Manchester United	(England)	April 1927	April 1931	182	57	82	43	31.32
