= Harry Rowley =

English footballer

Harry Rowley (23 January 1904 – 19 February 1982) was an English footballer. He played for many clubs during his career, including Manchester City, Manchester United, Shrewsbury Town, Oldham Athletic, and Burton Albion. During his United career, he scored 55 goals in seven seasons.
