= Ernie Goldthorpe =

English footballer (1898–1929)

Personal information
- Full name: Ernest Holroyde Goldthorpe
- Date of birth: 8 June 1898
- Place of birth: Middleton, Leeds, England
- Date of death: 5 November 1929 (aged 31)
- Place of death: Hunslet Carr, England
- Height: 5 ft 9 in (1.75 m)
- Position: Forward

Senior career*
Years	Team	Apps	(Gls)
- Tottenham Hotspur
1919–1920	Bradford City	15	(3)
	Leeds United	6	(2)
- Bradford City
1922–1925	Manchester United	27	(15)
- Rotherham United
- * Club domestic league appearances and goals

Ernest Holroyde Goldthorpe (8 June 1898 – 5 November 1929) was an English footballer who played as a forward. He was born in Middleton, Leeds. During the First World War he served with the pay corps of the Coldstream Guards and while stationed in London he joined Tottenham Hotspur, before moving back north to Bradford City, where he played 19 games and scored six goals. He played two injury-hit seasons with Leeds United, appearing in the club's first ever game. A brief return to Bradford City, was followed by a move to Manchester United in 1922, making his debut at Old Trafford against Fulham in October 1922. He scored four goals against Notts County in 1923, and a total of 15 goals in 27 matches. In 1925, he was transferred to Rotherham United.

== Personal life ==
Ernie Goldthorpe was the son of Walter Goldthorpe who played rugby union and rugby league in the late 19th and early 20th centuries, and the nephew of the rugby league footballer Albert Goldthorpe. Goldthorpe's marriage to Laura C. (née Jagger) was registered in Halifax district between April and June 1921, and the birth of their daughter, Beryl O. Goldthorpe, was registered in Hunslet district between January and March 1926.

== Death ==
Goldthorpe died of a heart attack at the age of 31 while suffering from double pneumonia as he attended to his poultry on his way home to Woodville Mount, Hunslet Carr, after playing badminton at St Oswald's Institute, Hunslet Carr.
