= Eric Sweeney (footballer) =

English footballer

Eric Edwin Sweeney (3 October 1903 – October 1968) was an English footballer. His regular position was as a forward. He was born in Birkenhead, Merseyside. He played for Charlton Athletic and Manchester United.
