= Bill Henderson (footballer, born 1898) =

Scottish footballer

William Henderson (1898–1964) was a Scottish footballer who played as a forward. Born in Edinburgh, he played for Airdrieonians before joining Manchester United in 1921. In 36 matches for Manchester United, he scored 17 goals.

In 1925, he was transferred to Preston North End, before spending time on the books of Clapton Orient, Heart of Midlothian, Morton, Torquay United and Exeter City.
