= Manchester Central F.C. =

Manchester Central
- Full name: Manchester Central Football Club
- Nickname(s): Magpies, Outcasts
- Founded: 1928
- Dissolved: 1935
- Ground: Belle Vue, Manchester (original club), Seashell Trust (current club)
- Manager: James McMahon
Home colours

Manchester Central was an English football club based in Manchester that was formed in 1928. The name was revived in 2015 by a new team in the Manchester Football League.

== History ==
The team was formed in 1928 by Manchester City director, John Ayrton and the owner of Belle Vue motorcycle Speedway, John Iles. Ayrton created Manchester Central because he felt East Manchester needed a League side. City had moved out of the area in 1923, but had initially considered moving to Belle Vue.

From 1928, the club played at the Belle Vue Athletics stadium, which from 1929, would be more commonly known as the Speedway Stadium. One of the coaches was Billy Meredith, the Welsh international and former Manchester City and Manchester United player. Their manager was James McMahon.

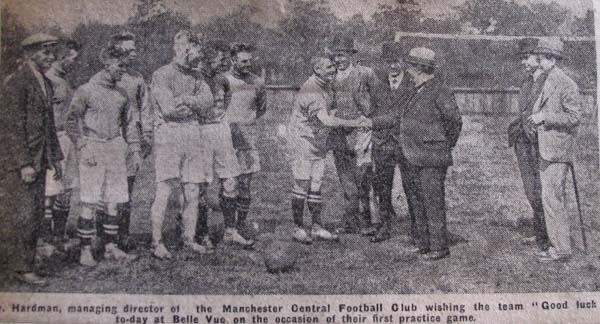
Players meeting Chairman before 1st practice match at Belle Vue in 1928

The club joined the Lancashire Combination in its first year finishing seventh in the twenty team competition. This led to an immediate application to join the Football League for the 1929–30 season; this bid failed.

The 1929–30 season, the club finished as runners up in the Combination and the reserves played in the Cheshire County League, the only other reserve teams in that league being from Football League clubs. After a successful season another application for League status was made and failed again.

The 1930–31 season was less successful finishing seventh in the Combination and the reserves bottom. A further application for League status failed with Chester gaining membership. This led to withdrawal from the Combination and focus solely on the Cheshire County League. After Wigan Borough had to resign from the Football League in October 1931, Central applied to take their place. This was initially accepted by the leaders of Division Three (North), but a formal complaint was made jointly by First Division Manchester City and Second Division Manchester United. They believed that a third Manchester side would seriously damage Manchester United, who were struggling for support and finance. The Football League backed the existing Manchester League sides and Central were denied. The Manchester clubs, in particular United, received significantly bad media coverage as a result and this act damaged their image and support further.

At the end of the season Central resigned from the Cheshire County League, realising their ambitions would be unfulfilled. They continued on for a few more seasons in the Manchester Amateur League.

Central were an ambitious side and attracted many significant crowds, such as 8,500 for the visit of Wrexham during 1929–30. They also signed international players, such as Welsh international Bert Gray.

== Common myths ==
It is widely believed that Manchester Central was considered as a new name for Newton Heath F.C. before becoming Manchester United in 1902, but there is no evidence to suggest this – all comments come from later histories, while detailed records and media reports from the period make no reference to this idea. In fact, it seems highly improbable as Manchester Central was already the name of another football side competing in Manchester in the 1890s. This first Manchester Central played at Alexandra Park and ceased to exist around the turn of the century. The directors of Newton Heath would not have selected that name for fear of confusion.

The name Manchester Central was considered as a name for F.C. United of Manchester.

== Colours ==
The club played in white shirts, black shorts, and black socks with white turnover.
