= Harry Thomas (footballer) =

Welsh footballer

Personal information
- Full name: Henry Thomas
- Date of birth: 28 February 1901
- Place of birth: Swansea, Wales
- Date of death: 1964 (aged 62–63)
- Place of death: Swansea, Wales
- Height: 5 ft 6 in (1.68 m)
- Position: Outside forward

Senior career*
Years	Team	Apps	(Gls)
1919–1920	Swansea Town	3	(0)
1920–1922	Porth		
1922–1930	Manchester United	128	(12)
1930–1932	Merthyr Town		

International career
1927	Wales	1	(0)
- * Club domestic league appearances and goals

Henry Thomas (born 28 February 1901) was a Welsh professional footballer who played as an outside left. He played for Swansea Town and Porth before joining Manchester United in 1922. He went on to make more than 100 appearances in the Football League for the club. He later played for Merthyr Town. During his career, he won a single cap for the Wales national football team.

== Career ==
Born in Swansea, Wales, Thomas began his career with his hometown side Swansea Town. He made his debut for the club in the Southern Football League but struggled to establish himself in the first team and left the side in 1920, having made three league appearances. He instead joined Welsh League side Porth where he helped the team win the Welsh League title in 1922, having formed a forward partnership with Evan Jones.

In April 1922, he was sold to Manchester United, where he made his debut against Oldham Athletic at Boundary Park on 22 April 1922. Thomas remained a reserve player for several years, making 30 appearances in his first four years at the club, before breaking into the first team during the 1925–26 season. He went on to play in Division One and Two for United. During his United career, he made 135 appearances and scored 13 goals.

During his time with United, he was capped by the Wales national football team on one occasion. His sole appearance came in a 3–3 draw with England, replacing Charlie Jones who was suffering from flu. After his spell at United he moved to Merthyr Town, spending two years with the side before finishing his career with Abercarn.
