= Arthur Lochhead =

Scottish footballer

Personal information
- Full name: Arthur William Lochhead
- Date of birth: 8 December 1897
- Place of birth: Busby, Scotland
- Date of death: 30 December 1966 (aged 69)
- Place of death: Edinburgh, Scotland
- Height: 5 ft 9 in (1.75 m)
- Position: Centre forward

Senior career*
Years	Team	Apps	(Gls)
1919–1921	Heart of Midlothian	25	(17)
1921–1925	Manchester United	147	(50)
1925–1934	Leicester City	303	(106)

Managerial career
- 1934–1936: Leicester City
- * Club domestic league appearances and goals

Arthur William Lochhead (8 December 1897 – 30 December 1966) was a Scottish footballer who played as a centre forward.

Having served in the Royal Garrison Artillery during World War I, Lochhead started his career with Heart of Midlothian, making his debut aged 21 in March 1919 (Note: Some sources list him as being loaned to Clyde in 1919, but checks of contemporary reports show the player involved was defender Matty Lochhead (no relation).) and soon came into consideration for the Scotland national team, taking part in the 1920 Home Scots v Anglo-Scots trial match before transferring to Manchester United in a swap deal in 1921, with Hearts exchanging him for £530 and Tom Miller.

After scoring 50 goals in 153 appearances for United, he transferred to Leicester City in 1925 for a club record fee, where he found the net over 100 times, played in another Scotland trial (the last of its kind) in 1928, and was part of the side who finished Football League First Division runners-up in 1928–29. He later managed the Foxes for two years.
