= Lal Hilditch =

English footballer (1894–1977)

Personal information
- Full name: Clarence George Hilditch
- Date of birth: 2 June 1894
- Place of birth: Hartford, England
- Date of death: 31 October 1977 (aged 83)
- Height: 5 ft 10 1/2 in (1.79 m)
- Positions: Outside left; wing half

Senior career*
Years	Team	Apps	(Gls)
- Hartford
- Witton Albion
1915–1916	Altrincham	17	(18)
1916–1932	Manchester United	301	(7)

Managerial career
- 1926–1927: Manchester United (player-manager)
- * Club domestic league appearances and goals

Clarence George "Lal" Hilditch (2 June 1894 – 31 October 1977), also known as Clarrie Hilditch, was an English footballer, and one of only two men to have been simultaneously a player and the manager at Manchester United (the other being Ryan Giggs).

Hilditch was born in Hartford, Cheshire, and began his playing career with Hartford, before moving on to Cheshire League sides Witton Albion and Altrincham. In January 1914 he joined Manchester United as an outside left, but soon changed to his favoured half back position. He featured three times during the 1913/14 season before establishing himself in the team the following term. Although he joined Manchester United during the First World War, he quickly established a name for himself as an astute halfback who was an incredibly clean tackler and read the game well.

In the summer of 1920 he was selected by the Football Association to be part of the 20-man squad that travelled to South Africa for a 14 match tour. Hilditch featured in all three 'tests' against South Africa but it was the closest he came to international recognition.

In October 1926, after John Chapman was suspended for unknown reasons, Hilditch took over the manager's job for the rest of the season in addition to his playing duties.

A stalwart in the United team for over a decade, he played 322 league games scoring 7 league goals before retiring in 1932 without winning any medals with the club.

== Managerial statistics ==
Team	Nat	From	To	Record				
Team	Nat	From	To	G	W	D	L	Win %
Manchester United	(England)	October 1926	April 1927	30	9	7	14	30.00
