= John Chapman (football manager) =

Scottish footballer and manager

Personal information
- Full name: John Albert Chapman
- Date of birth: 14 March 1882
- Place of birth: New Monkland, Scotland
- Date of death: 31 December 1948 (aged 66)

Senior career*
Years	Team	Apps	(Gls)
1904–1905	Rangers		
1905–1906	Albion Rovers		
1906–1907	Dumbarton	9	(3)

Managerial career
- 1910–1921: Airdrieonians
- 1921–1926: Manchester United
- * Club domestic league appearances and goals

John Albert Chapman (14 March 1882 – 31 December 1948) was a Scottish football player and manager. Born in New Monkland, Lanarkshire, he began his playing career with Rangers in 1904. A year later, he moved to Albion Rovers, before another transfer in 1906 to Dumbarton, where he scored three goals in nine appearances.

He later moved into management, and after 11 years as manager of Airdrieonians, he became the sixth manager in the history of Manchester United on 1 November 1921 after Jack Robson stepped down due to ill health. His first season in charge finished with United bottom of the league and relegated to the Second Division; however, Chapman guided them to second place to win promotion back to the top flight three years later.

On 7 October 1926, The Football Association announced that Chapman had been suspended from "taking part in football or football management" during the 1926–27 season "for improper conduct in his position as Secretary-Manager of the Manchester United Football Club". No further explanation for the suspension was ever given. By the next match, two days later against Bolton Wanderers, Lal Hilditch had taken over on a temporary basis as player-manager.

Following the end of his suspension, Chapman unsuccessfully applied to become manager of Leeds United and turned down two football management offers before taking up a position as the general manager of the Liverpool Greyhound Racing Club in August 1927.

== Managerial statistics ==
Team	Nat	From	To	Record				
Team	Nat	From	To	G	W	L	D	Win %
Airdrieonians	(Scotland)	14 July 1910	October 1921					
Manchester United	(England)	October 1921	October 1926	223	87	77	59	39.01
