= Jimmy Hanson (footballer, born 1904) =

English footballer

James Hanson (6 November 1904 – 14 January 1960) was an English football forward. Born in Manchester, he played for Bradford Parish Church in the Cheshire Amateur League early in his career. In December 1922, someone wrote in to the Manchester Football News, recommending Hanson to Manchester United. After trials in the 1923–24 season, he joined United in 1924. Hanson played his entire professional career with United. In a match against Birmingham on 25 December 1929, he suffered a broken fibula, and the injury forced him to retire in 1931. During his United career, he scored 52 goals in 147 appearances.

Hanson's long-awaited reappearance - and fourth appearance - finally came at Villa Park the following September and he did not disappoint, notching during a 2–2 draw against Aston Villa. His run of goals came to an end in the Manchester derby five days later, but he did make it five in six games by striking in a 6-1 thumping of Burnley.
