= Joe Spence (footballer, born 1898) =

English footballer

Personal information
- Full name: Joseph Waters Spence
- Date of birth: 15 December 1898
- Place of birth: Throckley, England
- Date of death: 31 December 1966 (aged 68)
- Height: 5 ft 8 1/2 in (1.74 m)
- Positions: Outside right; centre-forward

Youth career
- Blucher Juniors
- Throckley Celtic
- Newburn
- 1918–1919: Scotswood

Senior career*
Years	Team	Apps	(Gls)
1919–1933	Manchester United	481	(158)
1933–1935	Bradford City	75	(27)
1935–1938	Chesterfield	58	(10)
Total		614	(195)

International career
1926	The Football League XI	1	(1)
1926	England	2	(1)
- * Club domestic league appearances and goals

Joseph Waters Spence (15 December 1898 – 31 December 1966) was an English footballer. Manchester United purchased Spence from Scotswood in March 1919. His first game for the club came on 30 August 1919 against Derby County, at the start of the first Football League season after the First World War.

He scored 168 goals and made 510 appearances for Manchester United; at the time of his departure in 1933, both were club records. He was eventually overtaken by Jack Rowley as the club's top goalscorer on 8 March 1952, while his appearances record stood until 11 November 1964, when he was surpassed by Bill Foulkes.

One of United's few true stars between the wars, Spence's wing play made "Give it to Joe" the most commonly heard terrace chant during his 14 years at Old Trafford. His first season brought 14 goals in 32 First Division games, and in his best season at the club, 1927-28 season, he scored 24 goals; 22 in the league and two in the FA Cup. However, United were relegated to the Second Division twice during his 14 years there.

== Career ==
Born in Throckley, Newcastle, the young Spence played for Blucher Juniors and Throckley Celtic. While with the former, he scored an astonishing 42 of the team's 49 goals in his first season. At 13 he began work as a miner and was conscripted into the army at 17, where he served as a machine-gunner.

He guested for Liverpool, Newburn and Scotswood during his years in service and won the Army Cup with his battalion. But in March 1919, the year after the First World War ended, Spence signed for United from north-east amateur side, Scotswood.

He wasted no time making an impact: scoring four in a 5–1 Lancashire Section drubbing of Bury at Old Trafford on his debut. His official debut came in August when the league programme resumed and he was a model of consistency after that, making 510 appearances and scoring 168 goals.

Sadly for Spence, he failed to win any major honours and it was not until he left United in 1933 that he lifted any silverware – the Third Division North championship with Chesterfield, in 1936.

Spence played at Old Trafford during a difficult period in the club's history, when Manchester United won few major honours. His style of play made him a popular figure among supporters.

He left United to join Bradford City in 1933, where he played 75 games in two seasons, scoring 27 goals, including being top goal-scorer in the 1933–34 season. He left City to join Chesterfield in May 1935.

When the Second World War ended in 1945, newly appointed manager Matt Busby brought Spence back to Manchester United in a coaching and scouting role.

Despite his success at club level player, he was capped only twice by England, his chances of regular international recognition not helped by the fact that he spent several seasons playing outside the top flight.

His son, also named Joe, was on the books of Chesterfield, but didn't make an appearance for them before joining York City in 1950. In four years at York, he made 110 appearances before dropping into non-league football with Gainsborough Trinity.

He died on New Year's Eve 1966, at the age of 68.

== Honours ==
Manchester United

- Football League Second Division promotion: 1924–25

Chesterfield

- Football League Third Division North: 1935–36
