= 1939–40 Manchester United F.C. season =

English football club season

Manchester United
1939–40 season
- Chairman: James W. Gibson
- Manager: Walter Crickmer
- First Division: 10th
- War League Western Division: 4th
- War League Cup: Second Round
| Home colours | Away colours |

The 1939–40 season would have been Manchester United's 44th season in the Football League, and their second season back in the top flight after playing in the Second Division in 1937–38. However, due to the outbreak of war in Europe in September 1939, the league season was abandoned after just three games and the results expunged from the records. For this reason, appearances made and goals scored in the Football League matches that were played do not contribute to a player's overall appearances and goals record.

Many of Manchester United's players went off to fight in the war, but for those who remained, the Football League organised a special War League. The War League was originally split into ten regional divisions (Manchester United were placed in the Western Division), in accordance with the Government's 50-mile travel limit. A War League Cup was also set up to replace the FA Cup, which had also been interrupted at the preliminary round phase. United finished the league season with a record of 14 wins and 8 losses, and also reached the second round of the cup before losing to eventual runners-up, Blackburn Rovers.

== First Division ==
| Date | Opponents | H / A | Result F–A | Scorers | Attendance |
|---|---|---|---|---|---|
| 26 August 1939 | Grimsby Town | H | 4–0 | Bryant, Carey, Pearson, Wrigglesworth | 22,537 |
| 30 August 1939 | Chelsea | A | 1–1 | Bryant | 15,157 |
| 2 September 1939 | Charlton Athletic | A | 0–2 | | 8,608 |

| Pos | Team | Pld | W | D | L | GF | GA | GAv | Pts |
|---|---|---|---|---|---|---|---|---|---|
| 9 | Stoke City | 3 | 1 | 1 | 1 | 7 | 4 | 1.750 | 3 |
| 10 | Manchester United | 3 | 1 | 1 | 1 | 5 | 3 | 1.667 | 3 |
| 11 | Chelsea | 3 | 1 | 1 | 1 | 4 | 4 | 1.000 | 3 |

== War League Western Division ==
| Date | Opponents | H / A | Result F–A | Scorers | Attendance |
|---|---|---|---|---|---|
| 21 October 1939 | Manchester City | H | 0–4 | | |
| 28 October 1939 | Chester City | A | 4–0 | Pearson (2), Smith (2) | |
| 11 November 1939 | Crewe Alexandra | H | 5–1 | Carey, Hanlon, Pearson, Smith, Vose | |
| 18 November 1939 | Liverpool | A | 0–1 | | |
| 25 November 1939 | Port Vale | H | 8–1 | Wrigglesworth (5), Asquith, Pearson, Smith | |
| 2 December 1939 | Tranmere Rovers | A | 4–2 | Smith (2), Hanlon, Warner | |
| 9 December 1939 | Stockport County | A | 7–4 | Pearson (2), Smith (2), Hanlon, McKay, own goal | |
| 23 December 1939 | Wrexham | H | 5–1 | Pearson (2), Roughton, Hanlon, Butt | |
| 6 January 1940 | Everton | A | 2–3 | McKay, Smith | |
| 20 January 1940 | Stoke City | H | 4–3 | Jones (2), Butt, Pearson | |
| 10 February 1940 | Manchester City | A | 0–1 | | |
| 24 February 1940 | Chester City | H | 5–1 | Carey, Manley, Pearson, own goal (2) | |
| 9 March 1940 | Crewe Alexandra | A | 4–1 | Smith (2), Butt, Pearson | |
| 16 March 1940 | Liverpool | H | 1–0 | Pearson | |
| 23 March 1940 | Port Vale | A | 3–1 | McKay (2), Pearson | |
| 30 March 1940 | Tranmere Rovers | H | 6–1 | Smith (3), McKay, Roberts, Roughton | |
| 6 April 1940 | Stockport County | H | 6–1 | Butt (2), Pearson (2), Roughton, Wrigglesworth | |
| 6 May 1940 | New Brighton | H | 6–0 | Smith (2), Asquith, Butt, Whalley, Wrigglesworth | |
| 13 May 1940 | Wrexham | A | 2–3 | Butt (2) | |
| 18 May 1940 | New Brighton | A | 0–6 | | |
| 25 May 1940 | Stoke City | A | 2–3 | Burdett (2) | |
| 1 June 1940 | Everton | H | 0–3 | | |

| Pos | Club | Pld | W | D | L | GF | GA | GAvg | Pts |
|---|---|---|---|---|---|---|---|---|---|
| 3 | Everton | 22 | 12 | 4 | 6 | 64 | 33 | 1.94 | 28 |
| 4 | Manchester United | 22 | 14 | 0 | 8 | 74 | 41 | 1.80 | 28 |
| 5 | Manchester City | 22 | 12 | 4 | 16 | 73 | 41 | 1.78 | 28 |

Pld = Matches played; W = Matches won; D = Matches drawn; L = Matches lost; GF = Goals for; GA = Goals against; GAvg = Goal average; Pts = Points

== War League Cup ==
| Date | Round | Opponents | H / A | Result F–A | Scorers | Attendance |
|---|---|---|---|---|---|---|
| 20 April 1940 | First round First leg | Manchester City | H | 0–1 | | |
| 27 April 1940 | First round Second leg | Manchester City | A | 2–0 | Pearson, Wrigglesworth | |
| 4 May 1940 | Second round First leg | Blackburn Rovers | A | 2–1 | Carey, Smith | |
| 11 May 1940 | Second round Second leg | Blackburn Rovers | H | 1–3 | Carey | |
