= 1937–38 Manchester United F.C. season =

English football club season

Manchester United
1937–38 season
- Chairman: James W. Gibson
- Manager: Scott Duncan (until 7 November 1937); Walter Crickmer (from 9 November 1937)
- Second Division: 2nd (promoted)
- FA Cup: Fifth Round
- Top goalscorer: League: Tommy Bamford (14); All: Tommy Bamford (15); Harry Baird (15)
- Highest home attendance: 53,604 vs Bury (7 May 1938)
- Lowest home attendance: 14,572 vs West Ham United (23 February 1938)
- Average home league attendance: 27,944
Home colours	Away colours	Third colours

The 1937–38 season was Manchester United's 42nd season in the Football League.

The season began with Scott Duncan still manager after the club's relegation, but he was sacked on 7 November 1937 and two days later Walter Crickmer was appointed as the manager for the second time.

At the end of the season, United finished second in the league and were promoted back to the First Division, where they would remain for the next 36 years.

== Second Division ==
Date	Opponents	H / A	Result F–A	Scorers	Attendance
28 August 1937	Newcastle United	H	3–0	Manley (2), Bryant	29,446
30 August 1937	Coventry City	A	0–1		30,575
4 September 1937	Luton Town	A	0–1		20,610
8 September 1937	Coventry City	H	2–2	Bamford, Bryant	17,455
11 September 1937	Barnsley	H	4–1	Bamford (3), Manley	22,394
13 September 1937	Bury	A	2–1	Ferrier (2)	9,954
18 September 1937	Stockport County	A	0–1		24,386
25 September 1937	Southampton	H	1–2	Manley	22,729
2 October 1937	Sheffield United	H	0–1		20,105
9 October 1937	Tottenham Hotspur	A	1–0	Manley	31,189
16 October 1937	Blackburn Rovers	A	1–1	Bamford	19,580
23 October 1937	Sheffield Wednesday	H	1–0	Ferrier	16,379
30 October 1937	Fulham	A	0–1		17,350
6 November 1937	Plymouth Argyle	H	0–0		18,359
13 November 1937	Chesterfield	A	7–1	Bamford (4), Baird, Bryant, Manley	17,407
20 November 1937	Aston Villa	H	3–1	Bamford, Manley, Pearson	33,193
27 November 1937	Norwich City	A	3–2	Baird, Bryant, Pearson	17,397
4 December 1937	Swansea Town	H	5–1	Rowley (4), Bryant	17,782
11 December 1937	Bradford Park Avenue	A	0–4		12,004
27 December 1937	Nottingham Forest	H	4–3	Baird (2), McKay, Wrigglesworth	30,778
28 December 1937	Nottingham Forest	A	3–2	Bamford, Bryant, Carey	19,283
1 January 1938	Newcastle United	A	2–2	Bamford, Rowley	40,088
15 January 1938	Luton Town	H	4–2	Bamford, Bryant, Carey, McKay	16,845
29 January 1938	Stockport County	H	3–1	Bamford, Bryant, McKay	31,852
2 February 1938	Barnsley	A	2–2	Rowley, Smith	7,859
5 February 1938	Southampton	A	3–3	Redwood (2), Baird	20,354
17 February 1938	Sheffield United	A	2–1	Bryant, Smith	17,754
19 February 1938	Tottenham Hotspur	H	0–1		34,631
23 February 1938	West Ham United	H	4–0	Baird (2), Smith, Wassall	14,572
26 February 1938	Blackburn Rovers	H	2–1	Baird, Bryant	30,892
5 March 1938	Sheffield Wednesday	A	3–1	Baird, Brown, Rowley	37,156
12 March 1938	Fulham	H	1–0	Baird	30,363
19 March 1938	Plymouth Argyle	A	1–1	Rowley	20,311
26 March 1938	Chesterfield	H	4–1	Smith (2), Bryant, Carey	27,311
2 April 1938	Aston Villa	A	0–3		54,654
9 April 1938	Norwich City	H	0–0		25,879
15 April 1938	Burnley	A	0–1		28,459
16 April 1938	Swansea Town	A	2–2	Rowley, Smith	13,811
18 April 1938	Burnley	H	4–0	McKay (2), Baird, Bryant	35,808
23 April 1938	Bradford Park Avenue	H	3–1	Baird, McKay, Smith	28,919
30 April 1938	West Ham United	A	0–1		14,816
7 May 1938	Bury	H	2–0	McKay, Smith	53,604

Pos	Team	Pld	W	D	L	GF	GA	GAv	Pts	Qualification or relegation
1	Aston Villa (C, P)	42	25	7	10	73	35	2.086	57	Promotion to the First Division
2	Manchester United (P)	42	22	9	11	82	50	1.640	53	Promotion to the First Division
3	Sheffield United	42	22	9	11	73	56	1.304	53	
4	Coventry City	42	20	12	10	66	45	1.467	52	
5	Tottenham Hotspur	42	19	6	17	76	54	1.407	44	

Rules for classification: 1) Points; 2) Goal average; 3) Goals scored
(C) Champions; (P) Promoted

== FA Cup ==
Date	Round	Opponents	H / A	Result F–A	Scorers	Attendance
8 January 1938	Round 3	Yeovil Town	H	3–0	Baird, Bamford, Pearson	49,004
22 January 1938	Round 4	Barnsley	A	2–2	Baird, Carey	35,549
26 January 1938	Round 4 Replay	Barnsley	H	1–0	Baird	33,601
12 February 1938	Round 5	Brentford	A	0–2		24,147
