= 1934–35 Manchester United F.C. season =

English football club season

Manchester United
1934–35 season
- Chairman: James W. Gibson
- Manager: Scott Duncan
- Second Division: 5th
- FA Cup: Fourth Round
- Top goalscorer: League: George Mutch (18); All: George Mutch (19)
- Highest home attendance: 41,415 vs Bury (10 November 1934)
- Lowest home attendance: 7,372 vs Port Vale (6 February 1935)
- Average home league attendance: 23,370
Home colours	Away colours

The 1934–35 season was Manchester United's 39th season in the Football League. Having narrowly avoided relegation to the Third Division North the previous season, they progressed to fifth place, just six points short of promotion.

== Second Division ==
Date	Opponents	H / A	Result F–A	Scorers	Attendance
25 August 1934	Bradford City	H	2–0	Manley (2)	27,573
1 September 1934	Sheffield United	A	2–3	Ball, Manley	18,468
3 September 1934	Bolton Wanderers	A	1–3	own goal	16,238
8 September 1934	Barnsley	H	4–1	Mutch (3), Manley	22,315
12 September 1934	Bolton Wanderers	H	0–3		24,760
15 September 1934	Port Vale	A	2–3	T.J.Jones, Mutch	9,307
22 September 1934	Norwich City	H	5–0	Cape, T.J.Jones, McLenahan, Mutch, Owen	13,052
29 September 1934	Swansea Town	H	3–1	Cape (2), Mutch	14,865
6 October 1934	Burnley	A	2–1	Cape, Manley	16,757
13 October 1934	Oldham Athletic	H	4–0	Manley (2), McKay, Mutch	29,143
20 October 1934	Newcastle United	A	1–0	Bamford	24,752
27 October 1934	West Ham United	H	3–1	Mutch (2), McKay	31,950
3 November 1934	Blackpool	A	2–1	Bryant, McKay	15,663
10 November 1934	Bury	H	1–0	Mutch	41,415
17 November 1934	Hull City	A	2–3	Bamford (2)	6,494
24 November 1934	Nottingham Forest	H	3–2	Mutch (2), Hine	27,192
1 December 1934	Brentford	A	1–3	Bamford	21,744
8 December 1934	Fulham	H	1–0	Mutch	25,706
15 December 1934	Bradford Park Avenue	A	2–1	Manley, Mutch	8,405
22 December 1934	Plymouth Argyle	H	3–1	Bamford, Bryant, Rowley	24,896
25 December 1934	Notts County	H	2–1	Mutch, Rowley	32,965
26 December 1934	Notts County	A	0–1		24,599
29 December 1934	Bradford City	A	0–2		11,908
1 January 1935	Southampton	H	3–0	Cape (2), Rowley	15,174
5 January 1935	Sheffield United	H	3–3	Bryant, Mutch, Rowley	28,300
19 January 1935	Barnsley	A	2–0	Bryant, T.J.Jones	10,177
2 February 1935	Norwich City	A	2–3	Manley, Rowley	14,260
6 February 1935	Port Vale	H	2–1	T.J.Jones, Rowley	7,372
9 February 1935	Swansea Town	A	0–1		8,876
23 February 1935	Oldham Athletic	A	1–3	Mutch	14,432
2 March 1935	Newcastle United	H	0–1		20,728
9 March 1935	West Ham United	A	0–0		19,718
16 March 1935	Blackpool	H	3–2	Bamford, Mutch, Rowley	25,704
23 March 1935	Bury	A	1–0	Cape	7,229
27 March 1935	Burnley	H	3–4	Boyd, Cape, McMillen	10,247
30 March 1935	Hull City	H	3–0	Boyd (3)	15,358
6 April 1935	Nottingham Forest	A	2–2	Bryant (2)	8,618
13 April 1935	Brentford	H	0–0		32,969
20 April 1935	Fulham	A	1–3	Bamford	11,059
22 April 1935	Southampton	A	0–1		12,458
27 April 1935	Bradford Park Avenue	H	2–0	Bamford, Robertson	8,606
4 May 1935	Plymouth Argyle	A	2–0	Bamford, Rowley	10,767

Pos	Team	Pld	W	D	L	GF	GA	GAv	Pts
3	West Ham United	42	26	4	12	80	63	1.270	56
4	Blackpool	42	21	11	10	79	57	1.386	53
5	Manchester United	42	23	4	15	76	55	1.382	50
6	Newcastle United	42	22	4	16	89	68	1.309	48
7	Fulham	42	17	12	13	76	56	1.357	46

Rules for classification: 1) Points; 2) Goal average; 3) Goals scored

== FA Cup ==
Date	Round	Opponents	H / A	Result F–A	Scorers	Attendance
12 January 1935	Round 3	Bristol Rovers	A	3–1	Bamford (2), Mutch	20,400
26 January 1935	Round 4	Nottingham Forest	A	0–0		32,862
30 January 1935	Round 4 Replay	Nottingham Forest	H	0–3		33,851

== Squad statistics ==
Pos.	Name	League		FA Cup		Total	
Pos.	Name	Apps	Goals	Apps	Goals	Apps	Goals
GK	(England) Jack Hacking	22	0	2	0	24	0
GK	(England) Jack Hall	8	0	1	0	9	0
GK	(England) Len Langford	12	0	0	0	12	0
FB	(England) Jack Griffiths	40	0	3	0	43	0
FB	(Wales) Tom Jones	27	0	2	0	29	0
FB	(Ireland) Walter McMillen	4	1	0	0	4	1
FB	(England) Jack Mellor	1	0	0	0	1	0
FB	(England) Billy Porter	15	0	1	0	16	0
FB	(England) Henry Topping	1	0	0	0	1	0
HB	(England) Tom Manley	30	9	1	0	31	9
HB	(Scotland) Bill McKay	38	3	3	0	41	3
HB	(England) Hugh McLenahan	10	1	0	0	10	1
HB	(Scotland) William Robertson	36	1	3	0	39	1
HB	(England) George Vose	39	0	3	0	42	0
FW	(England) Jack Ball	6	1	0	0	6	1
FW	(Wales) Tommy Bamford	19	9	3	2	22	11
FW	(Scotland) Billy Boyd	6	4	0	0	6	4
FW	(England) Billy Bryant	24	6	2	0	26	6
FW	(England) Jack Cape	21	8	1	0	22	8
FW	(England) Ernie Hine	4	1	0	0	4	1
FW	(Wales) Tommy Jones	20	4	2	0	22	4
FW	(Scotland) George Mutch	40	18	3	1	43	19
FW	(England) Bill Owen	15	1	0	0	15	1
FW	(England) Harry Rowley	24	8	3	0	27	8
—	Own goal	—	1	—	0	—	1
