= 1940–41 Manchester United F.C. season =

English football club season

Manchester United
1940–41 season
- Chairman: James W. Gibson
- Manager: Walter Crickmer
- War League North Regional League: 8th
- War League Cup: First Round
Home colours	Away colours

The 1940–41 season was Manchester United's second season in the non-competitive War League during the Second World War.

Many of Manchester United's players went off to fight in the war, but for those who remained, the Football League organised a special War League. It was originally split into two regional divisions (Manchester United were placed in the North Division), with 36 clubs involved and positions were decided on goal average. Home and away games were not recognised as such and no points were awarded for draws or wins. United finished the league season with a record of 14 wins, 8 draws and 13 losses, and a goal average of 1.231, good enough for eighth place. To replace the FA Cup, a War League Cup was also set up, in which United lost to Everton in the First Round.

== War League North Regional League ==
Date	Opponents	H / A	Result F–A	Scorers	Attendance
31 August 1940	Rochdale	A	3–1	Aston, J. Carey, Smith	
7 September 1940	Bury	H	0–0		
14 September 1940	Oldham Athletic	A	1–2	Farrow	
21 September 1940	Oldham Athletic	H	2–3	Smith (2)	
28 September 1940	Manchester City	A	1–4	Smith	
5 October 1940	Manchester City	H	0–2		
12 October 1940	Burnley	A	1–0	Warner	
19 October 1940	Preston North End	H	4–1	Dodds (2), Buchan, J. Carey	
26 October 1940	Preston North End	A	1–3	Bryant	
2 November 1940	Burnley	H	4–1	Butt (2), J. Carey, Smith	
9 November 1940	Everton	A	2–5	Dodds, Smith	
16 November 1940	Everton	H	0–0		
23 November 1940	Liverpool	A	2–2	Smith, Warner	
30 November 1940	Liverpool	H	2–0	Butt, Smith	
7 December 1940	Blackburn Rovers	A	5–5	Dodds (2), Aston, Bryant, Mitten	
14 December 1940	Rochdale	H	3–4	Smith (2), J. Carey	
21 December 1940	Bury	A	1–4	McKay	
25 December 1940	Stockport County	A	3–1	Smith (2), Burrows	
28 December 1940	Blackburn Rovers	H	9–0	Smith (5), J. Carey (2), Aston, Mitten	
4 January 1941	Blackburn Rovers	A	2–0 (a.e.t.)	Smith (2)	
11 January 1941	Blackburn Rovers	H	0–0 (a.e.t.)		
18 January 1941	Bolton Wanderers	A	2–3 (a.e.t.)	Mears, Smith	
25 January 1941	Bolton Wanderers	H	4–1 (a.e.t.)	Pearson (2), J. Carey, Smith	
1 March 1941	Chesterfield	A	1–1	Smith	
8 March 1941	Bury	H	7–3	J. Carey (3), Rowley (3), Smith	
22 March 1941	Oldham Athletic	A	1–0	Smith	
29 March 1941	Blackpool	A	0–2		
5 April 1941	Blackpool	H	2–3	Mears, Smith	
12 April 1941	Everton	A	2–1	Rowley (2)	
14 April 1941	Manchester City	A	7–1	Rowley (4), Pearson (2), Smith	
19 April 1941	Chester	A	6–4 (a.e.t.)	Rowley (5), J. Carey	
26 April 1941	Liverpool	A	1–2	Rowley	
3 May 1941	Liverpool	H	1–1	Rowley	
10 May 1941	Bury	A	1–5	Rowley	
17 May 1941	Burnley	H	1–0	J. Carey	

Pos	Team	Pld	W	D	L	GF	GA	GAv
7	Halifax Town	30	10	13	7	64	51	1.255
8	Manchester United	35	14	8	13	80	65	1.231
9	Lincoln City	27	13	7	7	65	53	1.226

== War League Cup ==
Date	Round	Opponents	H / A	Result F–A	Scorers	Attendance
15 February 1941	First Round; First leg	Everton	H	2–2	Rowley, Whalley	
22 February 1941	First Round; Second leg	Everton	A	1–2	Rowley	
