= 1936–37 Manchester United F.C. season =

English football club season

Manchester United
1936–37 season
- Chairman: James W. Gibson
- Manager: Scott Duncan
- First Division: 21st (relegated)
- FA Cup: Fourth Round
- Top goalscorer: League: Tommy Bamford (14); All: Tommy Bamford (15)
- Highest home attendance: 68,796 vs Manchester City (12 September 1936)
- Lowest home attendance: 13,225 vs Preston North End (3 February 1937)
- Average home league attendance: 32,529
Home colours	Away colours

The 1936–37 season was Manchester United's 41st season in the Football League.

United finished the season in the 21st place and were relegated to the Second Division. A positive moment early in the season was the home win over neighbours Manchester City, watched by 69,000 in the stadium.

== First Division ==
Date	Opponents	H / A	Result F–A	Scorers	Attendance
29 August 1936	Wolverhampton Wanderers	H	1–1	Bamford	42,731
2 September 1936	Huddersfield Town	A	1–3	Manley	12,616
5 September 1936	Derby County	A	4–5	Bamford (3), Wassall	21,194
9 September 1936	Huddersfield Town	H	3–1	Bamford, Bryant, Mutch	26,839
12 September 1936	Manchester City	H	3–2	Bamford, Bryant, Manley	68,796
19 September 1936	Sheffield Wednesday	H	1–1	Bamford	40,933
26 September 1936	Preston North End	A	1–3	Bamford	24,149
3 October 1936	Arsenal	H	2–0	Bryant, Rowley	55,884
10 October 1936	Brentford	A	0–4		28,019
17 October 1936	Portsmouth	A	1–2	Manley	19,845
24 October 1936	Chelsea	H	0–0		29,859
31 October 1936	Stoke City	A	0–3		22,464
7 November 1936	Charlton Athletic	H	0–0		26,084
14 November 1936	Grimsby Town	A	2–6	Bryant, Mutch	9,844
21 November 1936	Liverpool	H	2–5	Manley, Thompson	26,419
28 November 1936	Leeds United	A	1–2	Bryant	17,610
5 December 1936	Birmingham	H	1–2	Mutch	16,544
12 December 1936	Middlesbrough	A	2–3	Halton, Manley	11,790
19 December 1936	West Bromwich Albion	H	2–2	McKay, Mutch	21,051
25 December 1936	Bolton Wanderers	H	1–0	Bamford	47,658
26 December 1936	Wolverhampton Wanderers	A	1–3	McKay	41,525
28 December 1936	Bolton Wanderers	A	4–0	Bryant (2), McKay (2)	11,801
1 January 1937	Sunderland	H	2–1	Bryant, Mutch	46,257
2 January 1937	Derby County	H	2–2	Rowley (2)	31,883
9 January 1937	Manchester City	A	0–1		64,862
23 January 1937	Sheffield Wednesday	A	0–1		8,658
3 February 1937	Preston North End	H	1–1	Wrigglesworth	13,225
6 February 1937	Arsenal	A	1–1	Rowley	37,236
13 February 1937	Brentford	H	1–3	Baird	31,942
20 February 1937	Portsmouth	H	0–1		19,416
27 February 1937	Chelsea	A	2–4	Bamford, Gladwin	16,382
6 March 1937	Stoke City	H	2–1	Baird, McClelland	24,660
13 March 1937	Charlton Athletic	A	0–3		25,943
20 March 1937	Grimsby Town	H	1–1	Cape	26,636
26 March 1937	Everton	H	2–1	Baird, Mutch	30,071
27 March 1937	Liverpool	A	0–2		25,319
29 March 1937	Everton	A	3–2	Bryant, Ferrier, Mutch	28,395
3 April 1937	Leeds United	H	0–0		34,429
10 April 1937	Birmingham	A	2–2	Bamford (2)	19,130
17 April 1937	Middlesbrough	H	2–1	Bamford, Bryant	17,656
21 April 1937	Sunderland	A	1–1	Bamford	12,876
24 April 1937	West Bromwich Albion	A	0–1		16,234

Pos	Team	Pld	W	D	L	GF	GA	GAv	Pts	Relegation
18	Liverpool	42	12	11	19	62	84	0.738	35	
19	Leeds United	42	15	4	23	60	80	0.750	34	
20	Bolton Wanderers	42	10	14	18	43	66	0.652	34	
21	Manchester United (R)	42	10	12	20	55	78	0.705	32	Relegation to the Second Division
22	Sheffield Wednesday (R)	42	9	12	21	53	69	0.768	30	Relegation to the Second Division

Source: World Football
Rules for classification: 1) Points; 2) Goal average; 3) Goals scored
(R) Relegated

== FA Cup ==
Date	Round	Opponents	H / A	Result F–A	Scorers	Attendance
16 January 1937	Round 3	Reading	H	1–0	Bamford	36,668
30 January 1937	Round 4	Arsenal	A	0–5		45,637
