= 1944–45 Manchester United F.C. season =

English football club season

Manchester United
1944–45 season
- Chairman: James W. Gibson
- Manager: Walter Crickmer (until 15 February 1945); Matt Busby (from 19 February 1945)
- War League North Regional League First Championship: 30th
- War League North Regional League Second Championship: 9th
Home colours	Away colours

The 1944–45 season was Manchester United's sixth season in the non-competitive War League during the Second World War.

On 15 February 1945, United manager Walter Crickmer had resigned and four days later on 19 February 1945, the Scottish manager Matt Busby was signed, but it was not until 1 October that Busby officially took over at the club.

Many of Manchester United's players went off to fight in the war, but for those who remained, the Football League organised a special War League.

== War League North Regional League First Championship ==
Date	Opponents	H / A	Result F–A	Scorers	Attendance
26 August 1944	Everton	A	2–1	Mycock, Currier	
2 September 1944	Everton	H	1–3	Bryant	
9 September 1944	Stockport County	H	3–4	Mycock (2), Bryant	
16 September 1944	Stockport County	A	4–4	Mycock (2), Bryant, Smith	
23 September 1944	Bury	H	2–2	Mycock, Walton	
30 September 1944	Bury	A	2–4	McCock, Woodcock	
7 October 1944	Chester	A	0–2		
14 October 1944	Chester	H	1–0	Freer	
21 October 1944	Tranmere Rovers	H	6–1	Mycock (2), Bryant, Chadwick, Dougan, Mitten	
28 October 1944	Tranmere Rovers	A	4–2	Bryant (2), Mycock, own goal	
4 November 1944	Liverpool	A	2–3	Mycock, Woodcock	
11 November 1944	Liverpool	H	2–5	Mitten, Mycock	
18 November 1944	Manchester City	H	3–2	Morris (2), Mycock	
25 November 1944	Manchester City	A	0–4		
2 December 1944	Crewe Alexandra	A	4–1	Bryant (2), Chadwick, Mycock	
9 December 1944	Crewe Alexandra	H	2–0	Bowden, Morris	
16 December 1944	Wrexham	H	1–0	Ireland	
23 December 1944	Wrexham	A	1–2	Morris	

Pos	Team	Pld	W	D	L	GF	GA	GAv	Pts
29	Blackburn Rovers	18	7	4	7	30	29	1.034	18
30	Manchester United	18	8	2	8	40	40	1.000	18
31	Preston North End	18	7	4	7	26	28	0.929	18

== War League North Regional League Second Championship ==
Date	Opponents	H / A	Result F–A	Scorers	Attendance
26 December 1944	Sheffield United	A	4–3	Morris (2), Bainbridge, Chadwick	
30 December 1944	Oldham Athletic	A	4–3	Mycock (2), Chadwick, Smith	
6 January 1945	Huddersfield Town	H	1–0	Smith	
13 January 1945	Huddersfield Town	A	2–2	Cockburn, Smith	
3 February 1945	Manchester City	H	1–3	Mitten	
10 February 1945	Manchester City	A	0–2		
17 February 1945	Bury	H	2–0	Mitten, Whalley	
24 February 1945	Bury	A	1–3	Bainbridge	
3 March 1945	Oldham Athletic	H	3–2	Chadwick, Rowley, Whalley	
10 March 1945	Halifax Town	A	0–1		
17 March 1945	Halifax Town	H	2–0	Chadwick, Roach	
24 March 1945	Burnley	A	3–2	Rowley (2), Chadwick	
31 March 1945	Burnley	H	4–0	Smith (3), Bryant	
2 April 1945	Blackpool	A	1–4		
7 April 1945	Stoke City	H	6–1	Rowley (2), Wrigglesworth (2), Bryant, Smith	
14 April 1945	Stoke City	A	4–1	Bryant (2), McCulloch, own goal	
21 April 1945	Doncaster Rovers	A	2–1	Bellis, Smith	
28 April 1945	Doncaster Rovers	H	3–1	Wrigglesworth (3)	
5 May 1945	Chesterfield	H	1–1	Bellis	
12 May 1945	Chesterfield	A	1–0	McDowell	
19 May 1945	Bolton Wanderers	A	0–1		
26 May 1945	Bolton Wanderers	H	2–2	Bryant, Wrigglesworth	

Pos	Team	Pld	W	D	L	GF	GA	GAv	Pts
8	Wolverhampton Wanderers	24	11	7	6	45	31	1.452	29
9	Manchester United	22	13	3	6	47	33	1.424	29
10	Darlington	24	13	3	8	61	45	1.356	29
