= 1943–44 Manchester United F.C. season =

English football club season

Manchester United F.C.
1943–44 season
- Chairman: James W. Gibson
- Manager: Walter Crickmer
- War League North Regional League First Championship: 2nd
- War League North Regional League Second Championship: 9th
Home colours	Away colours

The 1943–44 season was Manchester United's fifth season in the non-competitive War League during the Second World War.

Many of Manchester United's players went off to fight in the war, but for those who remained, the Football League organised a special War League.

== War League North Regional League First Championship ==
Date	Opponents	H / A	Result F–A	Scorers	Attendance
28 August 1943	Stockport County	H	6–0	Bellis (2), Smith (2), McDonald, McKay	
4 September 1943	Stockport County	A	3–3	McDonald (2), Bryant	
11 September 1943	Everton	H	4–1	McDonald (2), Broadis, Smith	
18 September 1943	Everton	A	1–6	Bellis	
25 September 1943	Blackburn Rovers	H	2–1	Bryant (2)	
2 October 1943	Blackburn Rovers	A	1–2	Roughton	
9 October 1943	Chester	H	3–1	Bellis (3)	
16 October 1943	Chester	A	4–5	Smith (2), McKay, own goal	
23 October 1943	Liverpool	A	4–3	Pearson (2), McDonald, Smith	
30 October 1943	Liverpool	H	1–0	McKay	
6 November 1943	Manchester City	A	2–2	S. Pearson, Smith	
13 November 1943	Manchester City	H	3–0	Bryant, Morris, Smith	
20 November 1943	Tranmere Rovers	H	6–3	Mitten (4), Smith (2)	
27 November 1943	Tranmere Rovers	A	1–0	McKay	
4 December 1943	Wrexham	A	4–1	Morris (2), Bryant, Smith	
11 December 1943	Wrexham	H	5–0	S. Pearson (3), Smith (2)	
18 December 1943	Bolton Wanderers	H	3–1	Morris, Smith, Warner	
25 December 1943	Bolton Wanderers	A	3–1	Smith (2), Bryant	

Pos	Team	Pld	W	D	L	GF	GA	GAv	Pts
1	Blackpool	18	12	4	2	56	20	2.800	28
2	Manchester United	18	13	2	3	56	30	1.867	28
3	Liverpool	18	13	1	4	72	26	2.769	27

== War League North Regional League Second Championship ==
Date	Opponents	H / A	Result F–A	Scorers	Attendance
27 December 1943	Halifax Town	H	6–2	S. Pearson (3), Smith (2), A. Rowley	
1 January 1944	Halifax Town	A	1–1	Smith	
8 January 1944	Stockport County	A	3–2	Brook (2), Bryant	
15 January 1944	Stockport County	H	4–2	Smith (3), Brook	
22 January 1944	Manchester City	H	1–3	Smith	
29 January 1944	Manchester City	A	3–2	J. Rowley (2), Smith	
5 February 1944	Bury	A	3–0	S. Pearson (2), Smith	
12 February 1944	Bury	H	3–3	Brook, Bryant, McKay	
19 February 1944	Oldham Athletic	H	3–2	Smith (3)	
26 February 1944	Oldham Athletic	A	1–1	Bryant	
4 March 1944	Wrexham	A	4–1	Bryant, Morris, J. Rowley, Smith	
11 March 1944	Wrexham	H	2–2	Pearson, Smith	
18 March 1944	Birmingham City	A	1–3	Smith	
25 March 1944	Birmingham City	H	1–1	J. Rowley	
1 April 1944	Bolton Wanderers	A	0–3		
8 April 1944	Bolton Wanderers	H	3–2	Bryant (2), Morris	
10 April 1944	Manchester City	A	1–4	Bryant	
15 April 1944	Burnley	H	9–0	Smith (3), Brook (2), Bryant (2), J. Rowley (2)	
22 April 1944	Burnley	A	3–3	Brook (2), Smith	
29 April 1944	Oldham Athletic	H	0–0		
6 May 1944	Oldham Athletic	A	3–1	Morris, Sloan, own goal	

Pos	Club	Pld	W	D	L	GF	GA	Pts
8	Cardiff City	21	13	1	7	53	28	27
9	Manchester United	21	10	7	4	55	38	27
10	Bradford Park Avenue	20	11	4	5	50	30	26

Pld = Matches played; W = Matches won; D = Matches drawn; L = Matches lost; GF = Goals for; GA = Goals against; Pts = Points
