= 1941–42 Manchester United F.C. season =

English football club season

Manchester United
1941–42 season
- Chairman: James W. Gibson
- Manager: Walter Crickmer
- War League North Regional League First Championship: 4th
- War League North Regional League Second Championship: 1st
Home colours	Away colours

The 1941–42 season was Manchester United's third season in the non-competitive War League during the Second World War.

Many of Manchester United's players went off to fight in the war, but for those who remained, the Football League organised a special War League.

== War League North Regional League First Championship ==
Date	Opponents	H / A	Result F–A	Scorers	Attendance
30 August 1941	New Brighton	H	13–1	J. Rowley (7), Smith (3), Bryant (2), Mitten	
6 September 1941	New Brighton	A	3–3	Carey, Morris, Whalley	
13 September 1941	Stockport County	A	5–1	J. Rowley (4), Mitten	
20 September 1941	Stockport County	H	7–1	J. Rowley (4), Carey, Mitten, Warner	
27 September 1941	Everton	H	2–3	J. Rowley, Smith	
4 October 1941	Everton	A	3–1	Carey, J. Rowley, Smith	
11 October 1941	Chester	A	7–0	Mitten (2), Smith (2), Morris, Warner, Whalley	
18 October 1941	Chester	H	8–1	J. Rowley (4), Smith (2), Bryant, Carey	
25 October 1941	Stoke City	A	1–1	Carey	
1 November 1941	Stoke City	H	3–0	Carey, Rowley, Whalley	
8 November 1941	Tranmere Rovers	H	6–1	J. Rowley (5), Smith	
15 November 1941	Tranmere Rovers	A	1–1	J. Rowley	
22 November 1941	Liverpool	A	1–1	Smith	
29 November 1941	Liverpool	H	2–2	J. Rowley (2)	
6 December 1941	Wrexham	H	10–3	Carey (4), J. Rowley (3), Smith (2), Bryant	
13 December 1941	Wrexham	A	4–3	Morris (4)	
20 December 1941	Manchester City	A	1–2	Morris	
25 December 1941	Manchester City	H	2–2	J. Rowley, Smith	

Pos	Team	Pld	W	D	L	GF	GA	GAv	Pts
3	Preston North End	18	13	1	4	58	18	3.222	27
4	Manchester United	18	10	6	2	79	27	2.926	26
5	Stoke City	18	12	2	4	75	36	2.083	26

== War League North Regional League Second Championship ==
Date	Opponents	H / A	Result F–A	Scorers	Attendance
27 December 1941	Bolton Wanderers	H	3–1	J. Rowley (2), Morris	
3 January 1942	Bolton Wanderers	A	2–2	Pearson, J. Rowley	
10 January 1942	Oldham Athletic	H	1–1	Morris	
17 January 1942	Oldham Athletic	A	3–1	Carey (2), J. Rowley	
31 January 1942	Southport	A	3–1	Carey, J. Rowley, Smith	
14 February 1942	Sheffield United	A	2–0	Carey, J. Rowley	
21 February 1942	Preston North End	H	0–2		
28 February 1942	Preston North End	A	3–1	J. Rowley (2), Carey	
21 March 1942	Sheffield United	H	2–2	Catterick, Smith	
28 March 1942	Southport	H	4–2	Catterick (2), Carey (2)	
4 April 1942	Blackburn Rovers	A	2–1	Catterick, Walker	
6 April 1942	Blackburn Rovers	H	3–1	Carey (2), Bryant	
11 April 1942	Wolverhampton Wanderers	H	5–4	Catterick (2), Carey, Morris, Smith	
18 April 1942	Wolverhampton Wanderers	A	0–2 (a.e.t.)		
25 April 1942	Oldham Athletic	H	5–1	Carey (2), Morris (2), Catterick	
2 May 1942	Oldham Athletic	A	2–1	Carey, Smith	
9 May 1942	Blackburn Rovers	A	1–1	Carey	
16 May 1942	Blackburn Rovers	H	0–1		
23 May 1942	Manchester City	A	3–1	Worrall (2), Whalley	

Pos	Team	Pld	W	D	L	GF	GA	GAv	PPG
1	Manchester United	19	12	4	3	44	25	1.760	1.47
2	Blackpool	22	14	4	4	108	34	3.176	1.45
3	Northampton Town	21	14	2	5	70	31	2.258	1.43
