= 1942–43 Manchester United F.C. season =

English football club season

Manchester United
1942–43 season
- Chairman: James W. Gibson
- Manager: Walter Crickmer
- War League North Regional League First Championship: 4th
- War League North Regional League Second Championship: 6th
Home colours	Away colours

The 1942–43 season was Manchester United's fourth season in the non-competitive War League during the Second World War.

Many of Manchester United's players went off to fight in the war, but for those who remained, the Football League organised a special War League.

== War League North Regional League First Championship ==
Date	Opponents	H / A	Result F–A	Scorers	Attendance
29 August 1942	Everton	A	2–2	Catterick, Pearson	
5 September 1942	Everton	H	2–1	Carey, Mitten	
12 September 1942	Chester	H	0–2		
19 September 1942	Chester	A	2–2	Catterick, Roughton	
26 September 1942	Blackburn Rovers	A	2–4	Bryant, Catterick	
3 October 1942	Blackburn Rovers	H	5–2	J. Smith (3), Mitten, Morris	
10 October 1942	Liverpool	H	3–4	J. Smith (2), Mitten	
17 October 1942	Liverpool	A	1–2	Carey	
24 October 1942	Stockport County	A	4–1	Bellis (2), Carey, own goal	
31 October 1942	Stockport County	H	3–1	J. Smith (2), Bellis	
11 November 1942	Manchester City	H	2–1	Pearson, own goal	
14 November 1942	Manchester City	A	5–0	J. Smith (3), Bryant (2)	
21 November 1942	Tranmere Rovers	A	5–0	Morris (2), J. Smith (2), own goal	
28 November 1942	Tranmere Rovers	H	5–1	Pearson (2), J. Rowley (2), J. Smith	
5 December 1942	Wrexham	H	6–1	J. Smith (3), Bellis (2), Bryant	
12 December 1942	Wrexham	A	5–2	J. Smith (3), Bryant, Carey	
19 December 1942	Bolton Wanderers	A	2–0	Carey, Mitten	
25 December 1942	Bolton Wanderers	H	4–0	Carey (2), Bryant, Roughton	

Pos	Team	Pld	W	D	L	GF	GA	GAv	Pts
3	Sheffield Wednesday	18	12	3	3	61	26	2.346	27
4	Manchester United	18	12	2	4	58	26	2.231	26
5	Huddersfield Town	18	10	6	2	52	32	1.625	26

== War League North Regional League Second Championship ==
Date	Opponents	H / A	Result F–A	Scorers	Attendance
26 December 1942	Chester	H	3–0	Bellis (2), Mitten	
2 January 1943	Chester	A	1–4	J. Smith	
9 January 1943	Blackpool	A	1–1	Pearson	
16 January 1943	Blackpool	H	5–3	Buchan (3), Bryant	
23 January 1943	Everton	H	1–4	J. Smith	
30 January 1943	Everton	A	5–0	J. Smith (3), Buchan, Pearson	
6 February 1943	Manchester City	A	0–0		
13 February 1943	Manchester City	H	1–1	J. Smith	
20 February 1943	Crewe Alexandra	H	7–0	J. Smith (3), Pearson (2), Bryant, Morris	
27 February 1943	Crewe Alexandra	A	3–2	Bryant (2), Broadis	
6 March 1943	Manchester City	H	0–1		
13 March 1943	Manchester City	A	0–2		
20 March 1943	Bury	H	4–1	J. Rowley (3), Broadis	
27 March 1943	Bury	H	5–3	Bellis, Hyde, McKay, J. Smith, own goal	
3 April 1943	Crewe Alexandra	H	4–1	J. Smith (2), McKay, Hyde	
10 April 1943	Crewe Alexandra	A	6–0	J. Smith (2), Black, Bryant, W. Griffiths, Pearson	
17 April 1943	Oldham Athletic	H	3–0	J. Smith, Bellis	
24 April 1943	Oldham Athletic	A	1–3	J. Smith	
1 May 1943	Sheffield United	H	2–0	Carey, J. Smith	
8 May 1943	Liverpool	A	3–1	Bellis, Pearson, J. Rowley	
15 May 1943	Liverpool	H	3–3	J. Rowley (2), Roughton	

Pos	Team	Pld	W	D	L	GF	GA	GR	Pts
5	Sheffield Wednesday	20	9	8	3	43	26	1.654	26
6	Manchester United	19	11	3	5	52	26	2.000	25
7	York City	18	11	3	4	52	30	1.733	25
