= 1938–39 Manchester United F.C. season =

English football club season

Manchester United
1938–39 season
- Chairman: James W. Gibson
- Manager: Walter Crickmer
- First Division: 14th
- FA Cup: Third Round
- Top goalscorer: League: Jimmy Hanlon (12); All: Jimmy Hanlon (12)
- Highest home attendance: 42,008 vs Arsenal (10 December 1938)
- Lowest home attendance: 12,073 vs Liverpool (6 May 1939)
- Average home league attendance: 29,791
Home colours	Away colours

The 1938–39 season was Manchester United's 43rd season in the Football League. Newly promoted back to the First Division, they secured their survival with a 14th-place finish.

== First Division ==
Date	Opponents	H / A	Result F–A	Scorers	Attendance
27 August 1938	Middlesbrough	A	1–3	Smith	25,539
31 August 1938	Bolton Wanderers	H	2–2	Craven, Own goal	37,950
3 September 1938	Birmingham	H	4–1	Smith (2), Bryant, Craven	22,228
7 September 1938	Liverpool	A	0–1		25,070
10 September 1938	Grimsby Town	A	0–1		14,077
17 September 1938	Stoke City	A	1–1	Smith	21,526
24 September 1938	Chelsea	H	5–1	Carey, Manley, Redwood, Rowley, Smith	34,557
1 October 1938	Preston North End	A	1–1	Bryant	25,964
8 October 1938	Charlton Athletic	H	0–2		35,730
15 October 1938	Blackpool	H	0–0		39,723
22 October 1938	Derby County	A	1–5	Smith	26,612
29 October 1938	Sunderland	H	0–1		33,565
5 November 1938	Aston Villa	A	2–0	Rowley, Wrigglesworth	38,357
12 November 1938	Wolverhampton Wanderers	H	1–3	Rowley	32,821
19 November 1938	Everton	A	0–3		31,809
26 November 1938	Huddersfield Town	H	1–1	Hanlon	23,164
3 December 1938	Portsmouth	A	0–0		18,692
10 December 1938	Arsenal	H	1–0	Bryant	42,008
17 December 1938	Brentford	A	5–2	Hanlon (2), Bryant, Manley, Rowley	14,919
24 December 1938	Middlesbrough	H	1–1	Wassall	33,235
26 December 1938	Leicester City	H	3–0	Wrigglesworth (2), Carey	26,332
27 December 1938	Leicester City	A	1–1	Hanlon	21,434
31 December 1938	Birmingham	A	3–3	Hanlon, McKay, Pearson	20,787
14 January 1939	Grimsby Town	H	3–1	Rowley (2), Wassall	25,654
21 January 1939	Stoke City	H	0–1		37,384
28 January 1939	Chelsea	A	1–0	Bradbury	31,265
4 February 1939	Preston North End	H	1–1	Rowley	41,061
11 February 1939	Charlton Athletic	A	1–7	Hanlon	23,721
18 February 1939	Blackpool	A	5–3	Hanlon (3), Bryant, Carey	15,253
25 February 1939	Derby County	H	1–1	Carey	37,166
4 March 1939	Sunderland	A	2–5	Manley, Rowley	11,078
11 March 1939	Aston Villa	H	1–1	Wassall	28,292
18 March 1939	Wolverhampton Wanderers	A	0–3		31,498
29 March 1939	Everton	H	0–2		18,348
1 April 1939	Huddersfield Town	A	1–1	Rowley	14,007
7 April 1939**	Leeds United	H	0–0		35,564
8 April 1939	Portsmouth	H	1–1	Rowley	25,457
10 April 1939	Leeds United	A	1–3	Carey	13,771
15 April 1939	Arsenal	A	1–2	Hanlon	25,741
22 April 1939	Brentford	H	3–0	Bryant, Carey, Wassall	15,353
29 April 1939	Bolton Wanderers	A	0–0		10,314
6 May 1939	Liverpool	H	2–0	Hanlon (2)	12,073

Pos	Team	Pld	W	D	L	GF	GA	GAv	Pts	Relegation
1	Everton (C)	42	27	5	10	88	52	1.692	59	
2	Wolverhampton Wanderers	42	22	11	9	88	39	2.256	55	
3	Charlton Athletic	42	22	6	14	75	59	1.271	50	
4	Middlesbrough	42	20	9	13	93	74	1.257	49	
5	Arsenal	42	19	9	14	55	41	1.341	47	
6	Derby County	42	19	8	15	66	55	1.200	46	
7	Stoke City	42	17	12	13	71	68	1.044	46	
8	Bolton Wanderers	42	15	15	12	67	58	1.155	45	
9	Preston North End	42	16	12	14	63	59	1.068	44	
10	Grimsby Town	42	16	11	15	61	69	0.884	43	
11	Liverpool	42	14	14	14	62	63	0.984	42	
12	Aston Villa	42	16	9	17	71	60	1.183	41	
13	Leeds United	42	16	9	17	59	67	0.881	41	
14	Manchester United	42	11	16	15	57	65	0.877	38	
15	Blackpool	42	12	14	16	56	68	0.824	38	
16	Sunderland	42	13	12	17	54	67	0.806	38	
17	Portsmouth	42	12	13	17	47	70	0.671	37	
18	Brentford	42	14	8	20	53	74	0.716	36	
19	Huddersfield Town	42	12	11	19	58	64	0.906	35	
20	Chelsea	42	12	9	21	64	80	0.800	33	
21	Birmingham (R)	42	12	8	22	62	84	0.738	32	Relegation to the Second Division
22	Leicester City (R)	42	9	11	22	48	82	0.585	29	Relegation to the Second Division

Source: World Football
Rules for classification: 1) Points; 2) Goal average; 3) Goals scored
(C) Champions; (R) Relegated

== FA Cup ==
Date	Round	Opponents	H / A	Result F–A	Scorers	Attendance
7 January 1939	Round 3	West Bromwich Albion	A	0–0		23,900
11 January 1939	Round 3 Replay	West Bromwich Albion	H	1–5	Redwood	17,641
