= Jack Griffiths =

English footballer

Personal information
- Full name: John Griffiths
- Date of birth: 15 September 1909
- Place of birth: Fenton, Staffordshire, England
- Date of death: 1975 (aged 65–66)
- Height: 5 ft 11 in (1.80 m)
- Position: Left-back

Youth career
- Shirebrook

Senior career*
Years	Team	Apps	(Gls)
1929–1932	Wolverhampton Wanderers	5	(0)
1932–1934	Bolton Wanderers	24	(0)
1934–1939	Manchester United	165	(1)
1945–1946	Hyde United	22	(0)
Total		216	(1)
- * Club domestic league appearances and goals

John Griffiths (15 September 1909 – 1975) was an English footballer who played at left-back for Wolverhampton Wanderers, Bolton Wanderers, and Manchester United in the 1930s. He won promotion out of the Second Division three times, once with Wolves and twice with Manchester United.

== Career ==
=== Wolverhampton Wanderers ===
Griffiths joined Wolverhampton Wanderers from Shirebrook in May 1929, making his debut on 26 April 1930 in a 4–4 draw with Bradford Park Avenue. This was one of just six appearances for the club, though. Wolves finished ninth in the Second Division in 1929–30, before finishing fourth in 1930–31 and winning the division in 1931–32.

=== Bolton Wanderers ===
He left Molineux, and moved to Bolton Wanderers in 1932, but did not make much of an impact as he had several injuries. The "Trotters" suffered relegation out of the First Division in 1932–33, and narrowly missed out on promotion back to the top-flight in 1933–34.

=== Manchester United ===
Griffiths left Burnden Park for Manchester United in March 1934, becoming a replacement for Jack Silcock, who left the club in August 1934. The "Red Devils" finished fifth in the Second Division in 1934–35, before going up as champions in 1935–36. He scored his only senior goal on 1 April 1936, in a 2–2 draw with Fulham at Craven Cottage. United were relegated straight out of the First Division in 1936–37, before winning promotion once again in 1937–38 with a second-place finish. United finished 14th in the top-flight in 1938–39. His professional footballing career was ended due to the Second World War, but he still played 58 games for the club during the war. He also guested for Notts County, Stoke City (16 appearances), Port Vale, West Bromwich Albion, Derby County.

=== Hyde United ===
After the war he became a player-coach of Cheshire County League side Hyde United. He played 22 league and two FA Cup games for Hyde. He also played in the 1946 Cheshire Senior Cup final victory over Witton Albion at Gresty Road on 30 March 1946. He later worked as a physiotherapist in Gee Cross, which was then in Cheshire.

== Career statistics ==
Appearances and goals by club, season and competition
Club	Season	League			FA Cup		Total	
Club	Season	Division	Apps	Goals	Apps	Goals	Apps	Goals
Wolverhampton Wanderers	1929–30	Second Division	1	0	0	0	1	0
Wolverhampton Wanderers	1930–31	Second Division	4	0	1	0	5	0
Wolverhampton Wanderers	Total		5	0	1	0	6	0
Bolton Wanderers	1932–33	First Division	21	0	1	0	22	0
Bolton Wanderers	1933–34	Second Division	3	0	0	0	3	0
Bolton Wanderers	Total		24	0	1	0	25	0
Manchester United	1933–34	Second Division	10	0	0	0	10	0
Manchester United	1934–35	Second Division	40	0	3	0	43	0
Manchester United	1935–36	Second Division	41	1	3	0	44	1
Manchester United	1936–37	First Division	21	0	0	0	21	0
Manchester United	1937–38	Second Division	18	0	0	0	18	0
Manchester United	1938–39	First Division	35	0	2	0	37	0
Manchester United	Total		165	1	8	0	173	1
Hyde United	1945–46	Cheshire County League	19	0	0	0	19	0
Hyde United	1946–47	Cheshire County League	3	0	2	0	5	0
Hyde United	Total		22	0	2	0	24	0
Career total			216	1	12	0	228	1

== Honours ==
Wolverhampton Wanderers

- Football League Second Division: 1931–32

Manchester United

- Football League Second Division: 1935–36
- Football League Second Division second-place promotion: 1937–38

Hyde United

- Cheshire Senior Cup: 1946
