= Louis Rocca =

Louis Rocca (15 September 1882–13 June 1950) was an English football administrator and scout who played a pivotal role in the development of Manchester United F.C. He had several roles within the club from the 1890s to the 1940s, most notably putting them in contact with Matt Busby in 1945; Busby would go on to manage the club for 25 years.

== Biography ==
=== Early years ===
A family of Italian gelato purveyors, Louis Rocca (senior) and his wife Mary, emigrated to England in the early 1870s and established an ice cream business at 64 Rochdale Road in the Newton Heath district of Manchester. Their son, Louis Rocca (junior), was born in Manchester between September and December 1882. He began his association with Manchester United (then known as Newton Heath F.C.) in the 1890s when he got a job as a tea boy at the club's Bank Street ground. He even played for the club's reserve team on a couple of occasions.

=== Manchester United ===
In 1902, the club was in severe financial difficulty but was saved at the 11th hour by local brewer John Henry Davies. He changed the club's colours from green and gold halves to red and white, but decided it would be more appropriate to convene a meeting of the club's fans, directors and other interested parties to determine a new name for the club. Rocca attended the meeting on 26 April 1902 and claims that, after hearing other people's suggestions of "Manchester Celtic" and "Manchester Central" be rejected for sounding "too Scottish" and "too industrial," he suggested the name "Manchester United." There is no documentary evidence that Rocca was actually the one to suggest the name "Manchester United," but Rocca maintained that Manchester United was his brainchild for the rest of his life. In 1903 Louis married Mary Emily Wrenshall and by 1911 he had taken over the family business and was living in Oldham Road in Manchester with his wife and four children. By the time of his mother's death in 1924, Louis was still managing the family ice cream and confectionery business and he was father to nine children.

=== Assistant manager and James Gibson ===
Over the years, Rocca came to be the club's chief "fixer" – if the club needed anything done, Rocca was the man for the job – until, in 1931, it was decided that he ought to be given some level of responsibility over the affairs of the team. With Herbert Bamlett's tenure as manager over, club secretary Walter Crickmer stepped into the breach as manager, with Rocca as his assistant. However, the club was yet again in financial turmoil at the time, and Rocca set about finding a new investor. The man he turned to was James W. Gibson, a partner in the clothing firm Briggs, Jones and Gibson, who had made their money in the manufacture of Army uniforms. As well as being an entrepreneur, Gibson was a fiercely proud Mancunian and unwilling to see such an integral part of the city's culture go under, so when club secretary Walter Crickmer visited Gibson at his Cheshire mansion, it didn't take much persuasion to convince Gibson to invest £2,000 in the club. Gibson then promised extra funds if other investors would match his £2,000 investment.

=== Chief scout ===
One of the legacies of the Gibson administration at Manchester United was the Manchester United Junior Athletic Club (MUJAC). Set up at the behest of the supporters', the MUJAC was charged with bringing the best young players in the local area to Manchester United, with the aim of eventually filling the first team with local talent. Rocca was appointed as the MUJAC's chief scout, and, through his connections to the Manchester Catholic Sportsman's Club, he appointed a network of scouts from the Catholic Church.

The two names that Rocca's scouting system is best known for discovering are Johnny Carey and Stan Pearson, and both go to show the breadth of the club's scouting network. Pearson was a local boy who Rocca spotted playing for Adelphi Lads' Club as a 16-year-old before signing for the club as an amateur on 1 December 1935, while Carey was a native of Dublin. Rocca had actually intended to scout another player when he went over to Ireland, but he was so impressed with Carey's air of authority that he immediately signed him for £250.

=== Busby ===
In 1932, United appointed Scott Duncan as manager, with Crickmer and Rocca reverting to their previous roles. However, Duncan resigned in 1937, and the two backroom men stepped into the breach again. They were in charge for two seasons before the outbreak of the Second World War and the suspension of all football in Britain. By the end of the war, the United board decided that a new permanent manager should be installed, and Rocca knew just the man, telling the board to "leave it to [him]". In 1930, Rocca had attempted to sign Manchester City wing-half Matt Busby for United, but the club was unable to pay the £150 transfer fee.

Nevertheless, Rocca and Busby stayed in touch, both being members of the Manchester Catholic Sportsman's Club, and when Rocca learned that Busby had been offered the manager's job at his then-club, Liverpool, he immediately wrote Busby a letter (addressed to his army regiment, in case it was intercepted by the Liverpool management) informing him of the job opportunity at United. Busby turned up at James Gibson's Trafford Park factory in February 1945 with demands for unprecedented control over the football team, but Rocca reassured his chairman that the Scot was the right man for the job and the contract was signed that day.

=== Later years, death and legacy ===
In the first few years after Busby's appointment as manager, the Manchester United team was almost entirely composed of players discovered by Rocca and his scouting system. Then, in 1948, Rocca had the ultimate honour bestowed upon him as his protégés won the FA Cup. In the team that day, Crompton, Carey, Aston, Anderson, Morris, Pearson and Mitten had all come through the youth system. However, this was to be his last major contribution to the club, as he died in 1950, bringing an association with the club of more than 50 years to an end. His legacy would continue, though, through Joe Armstrong, the man appointed as Rocca's replacement in the role of chief scout. Like Rocca, Armstrong would seek out the best young players in the Manchester area, and even further afield as the North East of England, where he discovered a 15-year-old Bobby Charlton in 1953.

In 2005, Rocca was honoured with the naming of an annual football match after him. The match was originally to be played between Salford Boys and Manchester Boys, but Manchester Boys were uninterested and Glasgow Boys were chosen as the opposition for the Salford side, in recognition of the ties between the cities of Manchester and Glasgow. The match, named "The Louis Rocca Trophy", was conceived by Salford-based artist Harold Riley, who had himself been a player for Salford Boys and a discovery of Rocca's for Manchester United, and Manchester-based restaurateur Bruno Cabrelli. Rocca was chosen as the inspiration for the match because, according to Riley, "one person never mentioned when people talk about United's history is Louis Rocca". Manchester United manager Alex Ferguson convinced Nike to provide both teams with kits for the occasion. Two matches were played on the inaugural occasion, one for the senior teams of both clubs and one for the juniors, with Glasgow Boys winning both; they won the senior match 1–0 and the junior match 5–4.
