= Hubert Redwood =

English footballer

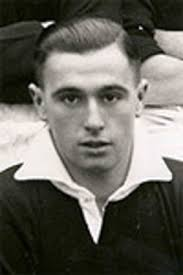

Personal information
- Date of birth: 13 June 1913
- Place of birth: St Helens, England
- Date of death: 28 October 1943 (aged 30)
- Place of death: St Helens, England
- Height: 1.73 m (5 ft 8 in)
- Position(s): Right-back

Senior career*
Years	Team	Apps	(Gls)
–1933	Sherdley Albion		
1933–1940	Manchester United	86	(3)
- * Club domestic league appearances and goals

Hubert Redwood (13 June 1913 – 28 October 1943) was an English professional footballer who played in the Football League for Manchester United as a right-back.

== Personal life ==
Redwood served as a corporal in the South Lancashire Regiment during the Second World War and died of tuberculosis on 28 October 1943. He was buried in St Helens Cemetery.

== Career statistics ==
Appearances and goals by club, season and competition
Club	Season	League			FA Cup		Total	
Club	Season	Division	Apps	Goals	Apps	Goals	Apps	Goals
Manchester United	1935–36	Second Division	1	0	0	0	1	0
Manchester United	1936–37	First Division	21	0	1	0	22	0
Manchester United	1937–38	Second Division	29	2	4	0	33	2
Manchester United	1938–39	First Division	35	1	2	1	37	2
Career total			86	3	7	1	93	4

== Honours ==
Manchester United

- Football League Second Division second-place promotion: 1937–38
