= Jack Smith (footballer, born 1915) =

English footballer and manager

Personal information
- Full name: John Smith
- Date of birth: 7 February 1915
- Place of birth: Batley, Yorkshire, England
- Date of death: 21 April 1975 (aged 60)
- Height: 6 ft 0 in (1.83 m)
- Position: Forward

Youth career
- Whitehall Printers
- Dewsbury Moor Welfare

Senior career*
Years	Team	Apps	(Gls)
1932–1934	Huddersfield Town	45	(24)
1934–1938	Newcastle United	104	(69)
1938–1946	Manchester United	36	(14)
1946–1947	Blackburn Rovers	30	(12)
1947–1948	Port Vale	29	(10)
1948–1950	Congleton Town	49	(21)
1950–1952	Macclesfield Town	38	(27)
Total		331	(177)

Managerial career
- 1951–1955: Macclesfield Town
- * Club domestic league appearances and goals

John Smith (7 February 1915 – 21 April 1975) was an English footballer and football manager. A forward, he scored 119 goals in 216 league games during nine seasons of peacetime football in the Football League.

He began his professional career at Huddersfield Town in 1932, helping the club to a second-place finish in the First Division in 1933–34, before he was signed by Newcastle United three years later. After scoring 73 goals in 112 Second Division games, he was sold to Manchester United for £6,500 in February 1938. He helped the Red Devils to win promotion in 1937–38, but then the outbreak of war in Europe robbed him of seven full seasons of First Division football. After the war he played for Blackburn Rovers. In May 1947, he transferred to Port Vale, before moving on to non-League Congleton Town in 1948 and Macclesfield Town in 1949, whom he managed from 1951 to 1955.

== Career ==
After spells with Whitehall Printers and Dewsbury Moor Welfare, Smith started his professional career with Huddersfield Town in 1932. He made his debut under Clem Stephenson in the 1932–33 campaign and scored his first First Division goal on 7 January, in a 1–0 win over Chelsea at Stamford Bridge. He then scored in a 4–0 win over Newcastle United at Leeds Road on 11 February, and seven days later bagged two goals against Aston Villa in a 3–0 win at Villa Park. He added to his tally with strikes against Sunderland, Sheffield Wednesday, Manchester City, and two against Arsenal, to finish his debut season with nine goals in 15 appearances.

He scored 15 goals in 24 league games in 1933–34, as the Terriers finished as runners-up, three points behind Arsenal. After just six goalless appearances in the 1934–35 campaign, he left Yorkshire to join Newcastle United, who had just recently lost their top-flight status. He was one of manager Tom Mather's first signings. Smith scored 16 goals to finish as the club's top scorer. However, they finished ten points short of Bolton Wanderers in the promotion places. Smith continued to be the Magpies' main target man in 1935–36, scoring 26 goals. However, Newcastle again finished with 46 points, nine behind second-placed Charlton Athletic. The 1936–37 season was his final full season at St James' Park, and Smith scored 24 goals; this time, Newcastle finished fourth, six points behind promoted Blackpool.

Newcastle faced a relegation battle in 1937–38, and Smith was transferred to Walter Crickmer's Manchester United for a club record £6,500 in February 1938. He scored on his debut in a win over Barnsley at Oakwell on 2 February. He totalled eight goals in 1937–38, as United finished in second place and were thus promoted back into the top flight. The Red Devils then consolidated their First Division status with a 14th-place finish in 1938–39, Smith scoring six goals. The outbreak of World War II then meant that the Football League was suspended for seven seasons. Smith was prolific in the War League Western Division in 1939–40, scoring 16 goals in United's 22 matches. He stayed at Old Trafford in 1940–41, bagging 26 goals in the War League North Regional League, including five against Blackburn Rovers on 28 December. In 1941–42, he hit 18 goals, as United finished fourth in the first edition of the War League North Regional League before winning the second instalment.

Smith hit 36 goals in 1942–43, hitting hat-tricks against Blackburn Rovers, Manchester City, Wrexham (home and away), Everton, and Crewe Alexandra. He stayed on for the 1943–44 season. He hit 35 goals, bagging hat-tricks against Stockport County, Oldham Athletic, and Burnley; United finished second behind Blackpool in the first instalment of the regional league. He scored nine goals in 1944–45 and hit a hat-trick past Burnley in front of newly appointed manager Matt Busby. Smith struck 17 times in 1945–46, including once against Accrington Stanley at Peel Park in first edition of the FA Cup since the outbreak of war. He did not, however, score a goal during the 1946–47 campaign, as Busby led his team to a second-place finish in the First Division, one point behind Liverpool.

Officially, Smith is recognised as having scored 15 league and cup goals for United during his career, but he also scored over 150 goals during the war. These goals are not counted towards the official total as they are classified as friendlies. He also guested for Burnley and Blackburn Rovers during the war. He left Manchester United after 15 goals in 41 league and cup games, and joined Eddie Hapgood's Blackburn Rovers for a £3,000 fee in March 1946. He was signed by Gordon Hodgson's Port Vale for a four-figure fee in May 1947. He scored on the penultimate day of the 1946–47 season, in a 4–2 win over Crystal Palace at the Old Recreation Ground. Smith enjoyed regular football until he pulled a stomach muscle in November 1947, which kept him out of action for four months. He recovered by March 1947 and regained his first-team spot but refused new terms at the end of the 1947–48 season and was transferred to Cheshire County League side Congleton Town, having scored 10 goals for the Valiants in 29 appearances in the Third Division South.

He moved on to Macclesfield Town and scored 33 goals in the 1950–51 season to become the club's top-scorer, lifting the Cheshire Senior Cup at the end of the campaign. He was appointed as manager in October 1951, and guided the Silkmen to the Cheshire County League title in 1952–53.

== Career statistics ==
Appearances and goals by club, season and competition
Club	Season	League			FA Cup		Other		Total	
Club	Season	Division	Apps	Goals	Apps	Goals	Apps	Goals	Apps	Goals
Huddersfield Town	1932–33	First Division	15	9	0	0	0	0	15	9
Huddersfield Town	1933–34	First Division	24	15	1	0	0	0	25	15
Huddersfield Town	1934–35	First Division	6	0	0	0	0	0	6	0
Huddersfield Town	Total		45	24	1	0	0	0	46	24
Newcastle United	1934–35	Second Division	27	16	1	0	0	0	28	16
Newcastle United	1935–36	Second Division	31	22	5	4	0	0	36	26
Newcastle United	1936–37	Second Division	28	24	1	0	0	0	29	24
Newcastle United	1937–38	Second Division	18	7	1	0	0	0	19	7
Newcastle United	Total		104	69	8	4	0	0	112	73
Manchester United	1937–38	Second Division	17	8	0	0	0	0	17	8
Manchester United	1938–39	First Division	19	6	1	0	0	0	20	6
Manchester United	1939–40	—	—		—		1	0	1	0
Manchester United	1945–46	—	—		4	1	0	0	4	1
Manchester United	Total		36	14	5	1	1	0	42	15
Blackburn Rovers	1946–47	First Division	30	12	4	0	0	0	34	12
Port Vale	1946–47	Third Division South	3	1	0	0	—		3	1
Port Vale	1947–48	Third Division South	26	9	1	1	—		27	10
Port Vale	Total		29	10	1	1	0	0	30	11
Macclesfield Town	1949–50	Cheshire County League	6	1	0	0	0	0	6	1
Macclesfield Town	1950–51	Cheshire County League	28	23	3	6	7	4	38	33
Macclesfield Town	1951–52	Cheshire County League	4	3	0	0	1	1	5	4
Macclesfield Town	Total		38	27	3	6	8	5	49	38
Career total			282	156	22	12	9	5	313	173

== Honours ==
Manchester United

- War League North Regional League Second Championship: 1941–42

Macclesfield Town

- Cheshire Senior Cup: 1951
- Cheshire County League: 1952–53
