= Wassall =

Wassall is a surname. Notable people with the surname include:

- Darren Wassall (born 1968), English football player and coach
- Grace Wassall Chadbourne (1870-1919), American composer, pianist, and singer
- Jackie Wassall (1917–1994), English football player
- Samuel Wassall (1856–1927), British Army personnel
