= Harry Baird (footballer) =

Northern Irish footballer

Personal information
- Date of birth: 17 August 1913
- Place of birth: Belfast, Ireland
- Date of death: 27 May 1973 (aged 59)
- Height: 5 ft 9 in (1.75 m)
- Positions: Centre-forward; midfielder

Youth career
- ?–1932: Dunmurry

Senior career*
Years	Team	Apps	(Gls)
1932–1933	Bangor		
1933–1937	Linfield		
- → Windsor Park Swifts
1937–1938	Manchester United	49	(15)
1938–1940	Huddersfield Town	19	(4)
- → Derby County (guest)
- → Grimsby Town (guest)
- → Halifax Town (guest)
- → Ipswich Town (guest)
- → Bradford Park Avenue (guest)
- → Linfield (guest)
1946–1952	Ipswich Town	216	(6)

International career
1936	Irish League XI	2	(1)
1937	Ireland	1	(0)
- * Club domestic league appearances and goals

Harry Baird (17 August 1913 – 22 May 1973) was a Northern Irish footballer who played for, among others, Linfield, Manchester United, Huddersfield Town and Ipswich Town. He was born in Belfast, at the time part of the country of Ireland. As an international, Baird was also called up by both Ireland teams – FAI XI and the IFA XI – but only played for the latter.

== Playing career ==
=== Club career ===
After a successful career with Linfield, where he won an Irish League title and Irish Cup, Baird was signed by Manchester United in January 1937 for a fee of £3,500. He joined a struggling side and could do little to prevent United from being relegated at the end of the 1936–37 season. However the following season, together with Johnny Carey, Jack Rowley, Tommy Breen, Stan Pearson and Tommy Bamford, he helped United gain promotion back to the First Division. Together with Bamford, he finished as United's joint top goalscorer that season, both players scoring 15 goals each. Baird then joined Huddersfield Town in September 1938 and while there helped them reach the semi-final of the FA Cup in 1939.

During the Second World War, Baird served in the RAF and guested with several clubs, including his former club Linfield and Ipswich Town, who he would eventually sign for when the war finished. At the time Ipswich were playing in the English Third Division South. Baird made his debut for Ipswich on 31 August 1946 in an away game against Leyton Orient. He went on to make 216 league appearances for Ipswich, scoring six goals. He also played a further 18 games and scored a further goal for them in the FA Cup. Baird retired as a player during the 1951–52 season, making his final appearance for Ipswich at Crystal Palace on 20 October 1951. He subsequently became a coach at the club.

=== Irish international ===
When Baird was playing there were, in effect, two Ireland teams, chosen by two rival associations. Both associations, the Northern Ireland-based IFA and the Irish Free State-based FAI claimed jurisdiction over the whole of Ireland and selected players from the whole island. As a result, several notable Irish players from this era played for both teams. However each association challenged the selection policy of their rival and Baird found himself caught in the middle of one of several disputes.

In May 1938, Baird, together with Jackie Brown and Walter McMillen, was one of three Northern Ireland-born players called up by the FAI XI to play in two friendlies against Czechoslovakia and Poland. However the IFA objected and Baird subsequently received a telegram from the English FA ordering him not to accept the offer on the grounds he was not born in the Irish Free State. Baird was bitterly disappointed at missing the chance of an international debut and was keen to play for financial reasons as much as anything. He was neutral about the dispute and was willing to play for either team. However facing suspension from the English FA, he eventually declined the FAI offer.

While playing for Huddersfield Town, Baird subsequently made his only appearance for the IFA XI on 16 November 1938, in a 7–0 defeat to England at Old Trafford. The Second World War effectively put an end to Baird's international career. Earlier while playing for Linfield, Baird also represented the Irish League XI on two occasions in 1936. He scored on his debut against the Scottish Football League XI at Ibrox and then later assisted them to a 3–2 win against the English League XI.

== Sources ==
- Sean Ryan (1997). The Boys in Green – The FAI International Story.
