= 1938 FA Cup final =

- Event: 1937–38 FA Cup
Preston North End	Huddersfield Town
1	0
- After extra time
- Date: 30 April 1938
- Venue: Wembley Stadium, London
- Referee: A. Jewell (London)
- Attendance: 93,497

The 1938 FA Cup final was contested by Preston North End and Huddersfield Town at Wembley Stadium. Preston, losing finalists the previous year, won by a single goal. This was their second win in the competition.

== Background ==
After 29 minutes of extra time it was still 0–0 and BBC commentator Thomas Woodrooffe said "if there's a goal scored now, I'll eat my hat". Seconds later, Preston were awarded a penalty, from which George Mutch scored the winning goal; Woodrooffe kept his promise, though it was one made of cake and marzipan. Bill Shankly (who played in that game for the Preston side) recalls that special moment in his autobiography from 1976: "The ball hit the bar, which was square then, took the paint off it, screamed into the middle of the goal and ran down the back of the net." And then adds: "The paint is on the ball to this day. I saw it again in 1971, when Liverpool reached the final and played Arsenal. When we were preparing for Wembley, Tommy Smith, who was the Preston captain in 1938, came to the training ground at Melwood and showed the ball to his namesake, Tommy Smith, the Liverpool captain in 1971."

This was the first FA Cup final to be broadcast on television, by the BBC. It was a repeat of the 1922 FA Cup Final. This time the scores were reversed but once again a penalty was needed to separate the two sides.

Three of the players who participated in the final (Andy Beattie and Bill Shankly of Preston and Eddie Boot of Huddersfield) would all manage Huddersfield within 20 years of this final.

The last surviving member of the winning team was Bobby Beattie, who died in September 2002 at the age of 86.

== Match details ==
30 April 1938
15:00 BST

Preston North End	1–0 (a.e.t.)	Huddersfield Town
Mutch 119' (pen.)	Report

Wembley Stadium, London
Attendance: 93,497
Referee: A. Jewell (London)

Preston	Huddersfield

GK	(England) George Holdcroft
RB	(England) Frank Gallimore
LB	(Scotland) Andy Beattie
RH	(Scotland) Bill Shankly
CH	(Scotland) Tom Smith (c)
LH	(England) Bob Batey
OR	(England) Dickie Watmough
IR	(Scotland) George Mutch
CF	(Scotland) Bud Maxwell
IL	(Scotland) Bobby Beattie
OL	(Scotland) Hugh O'Donnell
Manager:
(England) James Taylor (acting)

GK	(England) Bob Hesford
RB	(England) Benny Craig
LB	(England) Reg Mountford
RH	(England) Ken Willingham
CH	(England) Alf Young (c)
LH	(England) Eddie Boot
OR	(England) Joe Hulme
IR	(England) Jimmy Isaac
CF	(Scotland) Willie MacFadyen
IL	(England) Bobby Barclay
OL	(England) Pat Beasley
Manager:
(England) Clem Stephenson

Match rules

- 90 minutes.
- 30 minutes of extra-time if necessary.
- Replay if scores still level.

== Road to Wembley ==
=== Preston North End ===
8 Jan 1938
3rd Round

Preston North End	3 - 0	West Ham United

Deepdale, Preston
22 Jan 1938
4th Round

Preston North End	2 - 0	Leicester City

Deepdale, Preston
12 Feb 1938
5th Round

Arsenal	0 - 1	Preston North End

Highbury, London
5 Mar 1938
6th Round

Brentford	0 - 3	Preston North End

Griffin Park, London
26 Mar 1938
Semi-final

Preston North End	2 - 1	Aston Villa

Bramall Lane, Sheffield

=== Huddersfield Town ===
8 Jan 1938
3rd Round

Huddersfield Town	3 - 1	Hull City

Leeds Road, Huddersfield
22 Jan 1938
4th Round

Huddersfield Town	1 - 0	Notts County

Leeds Road, Huddersfield
12 Feb 1938
5th Round

Liverpool	0 - 1	Huddersfield Town

Anfield, Liverpool
5 Mar 1938
6th Round

York City	0 - 0	Huddersfield Town

Bootham Crescent, York
9 Mar 1938
6th Round Replay

Huddersfield Town	2 - 1	York City

Leeds Road, Huddersfield
26 Mar 1938
Semi-final

Huddersfield Town	3 - 1	Sunderland

Ewood Park, Blackburn
