= Joe Armstrong (football scout) =

English football scout

Joe Armstrong (1894–1975) succeeded Louis Rocca as chief scout of Manchester United after World War II. At United, Armstrong worked very closely alongside reserve team manager and fellow scout, Jimmy Murphy, and the youth players that made their debut from the early 1950s onwards are a tribute to their scouting skills.

Early in 1953, Joe Armstrong signed 15-year-old Bobby Charlton, who went on to be widely regarded as one of the best football players in the world, being part of Manchester United's European Cup winning team of 1968 and the 1966 England World Cup winning team.

Another notable signing was Duncan Edwards, who broke into the Manchester United first team at the age of 17, was capped for the England team at 18, and gained two Football League championship medals as well as 18 England caps before he died two weeks after being injured in the Munich air disaster of 1958.

Armstrong died in 1975 at the age of 81.
