= Jimmy Jewell (association football) =

English football manager and referee

Arthur James Jewell (1898–1952), also known as A. J. Jewell, was an English association football manager and referee who during his career coached Norwich City in 1939.

Jewell was born in West Hampstead, London in 1898. During the First World War, he served in the Royal Naval Air Service and became one of the first pilots of the Royal Air Force in 1918.

After a brief amateur football career, he became a referee, reaching Football League standard by 1932. He refereed the 1938 FA Cup Final as well as sixteen international matches, including a game between Austria and Egypt in the football tournament at the 1936 Summer Olympics in Berlin.

In January 1939 he became general manager and secretary of Norwich City in Division Two of the Football League.

At the outbreak of the Second World War, he rejoined the RAF, serving as a squadron leader and physical fitness officer.

He became a television commentator for the BBC in 1947 and commentated during the 1948 Summer Olympics as well as five FA Cup Finals before his sudden death in 1952.
