= Bill Fielding =

English footballer

Personal information
- Full name: William Fielding
- Date of birth: 17 June 1915
- Place of birth: Broadhurst, Congleton, Cheshire, England
- Date of death: May 2006 (age 90)
- Place of death: Lytham St Annes, Lancashire, England
- Height: 5 ft 11 in (1.80 m)
- Position: Goalkeeper

Senior career*
Years	Team	Apps	(Gls)
?–?	Broadbottom YMCA	?	(?)
?–1936	Hurst	?	(?)
1936–1944	Cardiff City	50	(0)
1944–1947	Bolton Wanderers	0	(0)
1947–1948	Manchester United	6	(0)
- * Club domestic league appearances and goals

William Fielding (17 June 1915 – May 2006) was an English footballer who played as a goalkeeper for Cardiff City, Bolton Wanderers and Manchester United in the 1930s and 1940s.

== Career ==
Born in Broadhurst, Congleton, Cheshire, Fielding began his football career playing for the Broadbottom YMCA's team, before joining Hurst. In May 1936, at the age of 20, Fielding joined Cardiff City, where he played until the outbreak of the Second World War in 1939, making a total of 50 appearances in that time. During the war, Fielding made guest appearances for Stockport County and Bolton Wanderers. He officially became a Bolton Wanderers player in June 1944, but never made a league appearance for them.

In January 1947, Fielding signed for Manchester United as cover for the injured Jack Crompton in a deal which saw Billy Wrigglesworth move to Bolton. He made his debut on 25 January 1947, playing in the club's FA Cup Fourth Round defeat to Nottingham Forest. He played in seven consecutive games for United, culminating with a 4–3 away defeat to Derby County on 15 March. However, he never played for the club again after that, and retired from football in 1948.
