= Tom Manley (footballer) =

English footballer and manager

- Manley while a Brentford player

Personal information
- Full name: Thomas Ronald Manley
- Date of birth: 7 October 1912
- Place of birth: Northwich, England
- Date of death: 4 July 1988 (aged 75)
- Place of death: Brentwood, England
- Height: 6 ft 1 1/2 in (1.87 m)
- Positions: Utility player; outside left

Youth career
- 1927–1928: Brunner Mond
- 1928–1929: Norley United

Senior career*
Years	Team	Apps	(Gls)
1929–1930	Northwich Victoria		
1930–1939	Manchester United	188	(40)
1939–1952	Brentford	116	(8)

Managerial career
- 1954: Northwich Victoria
- * Club domestic league appearances and goals

Thomas Ronald Manley (7 October 1912 – 4 July 1988) was an English professional footballer who made over 300 appearances in the Football League for Manchester United and Brentford as a utility player. He later managed hometown club Northwich Victoria in non-League football.

== Playing career ==
=== Early years ===
Manley began his career with junior clubs Brunner Mond and Norley United, before joining Cheshire County League club Northwich Victoria in 1929. He remained at Drill Field until September 1930.

=== Manchester United ===
Manley was brought to First Division club Manchester United by scout Louis Rocca on an amateur basis in September 1930. At the end of the 1930–31 season, after the club's relegation to the Second Division, he signed a professional contract. Manley broke into the team over the course of the 1932–33 and 1933–34 seasons and scored 15 goals in United's 1935–36 Second Division title-winning campaign. After suffering relegation straight back to the Second Division at the end of the 1936–37 season, he helped the team to an immediate return to the top-flight one season later. 1938–39 was Manley's final season at Old Trafford and he finished his Manchester United career having made 195 appearances and scored 41 goals. Predominantly an outside left, he also performed the role of a utility player at Old Trafford by also playing in half and full back positions.

=== Brentford ===
Manley joined First Division club Brentford for a "substantial fee" in August 1939 and was immediately named captain. Just three matches of the 1939–40 season were played before the season was abandoned and competitive football was suspended for the duration of the Second World War. Manley's duties with the RAF meant that he appeared sparingly for the club during the war, making just 36 appearances and scoring six goals by the end of the 1945–46 season. He also played as a guest player for Blackpool, Chester, Fulham, Manchester United, Norwich City, Nottingham Forest and Tottenham Hotspur during the war. Competitive football resumed for the 1946–47 season and Manley would go on to make 122 appearances and scored 8 goals for the club before making his final appearance in September 1950. He remained as Griffin Park as a reserve team player for the 1951–52 season (playing one match as a goalkeeper) before retiring at age 39 in May 1952. Manley was awarded a joint-testimonial with Ted Gaskell versus a Tommy Lawton XI in April 1954.

== Management career ==
Manley managed Cheshire County League club Northwich Victoria, with whom he began his career as a player, between March and October 1954.

== Personal life ==
Manley served in the RAF during the Second World War. After his retirement from football, he became the licensee of a pub in Northwich.

== Career statistics ==
Appearances and goals by club, season and competition
Club	Season	League			FA Cup		Total	
Club	Season	Division	Apps	Goals	Apps	Goals	Apps	Goals
Manchester United	1931–32	Second Division	3	0	0	0	3	0
Manchester United	1932–33	Second Division	19	0	0	0	19	0
Manchester United	1933–34	Second Division	30	2	2	0	32	2
Manchester United	1934–35	Second Division	30	9	1	0	31	9
Manchester United	1935–36	Second Division	31	14	3	1	34	15
Manchester United	1936–37	First Division	31	5	0	0	31	5
Manchester United	1937–38	Second Division	21	7	1	0	22	7
Manchester United	1938–39	First Division	23	3	0	0	23	3
Manchester United	Total		188	40	7	1	195	41
Brentford	1946–47	First Division	9	0	0	0	9	0
Brentford	1947–48	Second Division	27	0	2	0	29	0
Brentford	1948–49	Second Division	42	3	4	0	46	3
Brentford	1949–50	Second Division	33	2	0	0	33	2
Brentford	1950–51	Second Division	5	2	0	0	5	2
Brentford	Total		116	8	6	0	122	8
Career total			304	48	13	1	317	49

== Honours ==
Manchester United

- Football League Second Division: 1935–36
- Football League Second Division second-place promotion: 1937–38
