= Len Bradbury =

English footballer

Leonard Bradbury (July 1914 – 2007) was an English footballer. His regular position was as a forward. He was born in Northwich, Cheshire. He played for Manchester United, Old Wittonians, Northwich Victoria, and University of Manchester.
