= Jack McDonald (English footballer) =

English footballer (1921–2007)

Personal information
- Full name: John Christopher McDonald
- Date of birth: 27 August 1921
- Place of birth: Maltby, West Riding of Yorkshire, England
- Date of death: 28 June 2007 (aged 85)
- Place of death: Ryde, England
- Height: 5 ft 9 in (1.75 m)
- Position: Outside right

Youth career
- 1937–1938: Wolverhampton Wanderers

Senior career*
Years	Team	Apps	(Gls)
1938–1939	Wolverhampton Wanderers	2	(0)
1939–1948	Bournemouth & Boscombe Athletic	80	(36)
1948–1952	Fulham	75	(19)
1952–1953	Southampton	16	(4)
1953–1955	Southend United	28	(6)
1955–1957	Weymouth		
1957–19??	Poole Town		
- * Club domestic league appearances and goals

John Christopher McDonald (27 August 1921 – 28 June 2007) was an English footballer who played as an outside forward for various clubs in the 1940s and 1950s. During his spell at Fulham, he helped them claim the Football League Second Division championship title in 1949.

== Football career ==
McDonald was born in Maltby, West Riding of Yorkshire and joined Wolverhampton Wanderers as a trainee in May 1937, aged 15. Shortly after his 17th birthday, in September 1938, he signed professional papers before going on to make two appearances for "Wolves" in the First Division.

In May 1939, McDonald was transferred to Bournemouth & Boscombe Athletic, but the Second World War broke out and normal football was suspended before he made his debut. During the war, he made guest appearances for a whole host of clubs, including Bristol City, Cardiff City, Manchester United, Wolverhampton Wanderers, West Bromwich Albion, York City, Southampton and Chelsea. He won the southern Football League War Cup with Chelsea in 1945 and scored in the final at Wembley.

At the end of the war, he returned to Bournemouth and soon made a name for himself as a goal-scoring left-winger, scoring 36 goals in 80 appearances in the Football League Third Division South. In 1948, Bournemouth finished as runners-up, but missed out on the only promotion spot available. (It was to be nearly 40 years before the "Cherries" eventually reached the Second Division.)

McDonald's form soon attracted the attention of bigger teams, and in June 1948 he moved to London to join Fulham for a fee of £12,000. At the time of his transfer, Fulham's manager Jack Peart commented in the club's year book:

"For the present season 1948–9, we have made a few additions to our playing staff. No doubt chief interest will be focused on Jack McDonald, whose transfer we have secured from the Bournemouth and Boscombe Club in spite of very strong competition. I am certain Jack will prove a great acquisition."

McDonald only missed one match in the 1948–49 season, scoring nine goals. His crosses assisted the other forwards, including Arthur Rowley, who scored 19, and Bob Thomas, who was top scorer with 23, as the club claimed the Football League Second Division championship title by one point ahead of West Bromwich Albion and long-time leaders, Southampton.

In the First Division, McDonald's form was not so prolific and he eventually lost his place to Northern Ireland international Johnny Campbell, making only five appearances in each of the 1950–51 and 1951–52 seasons.

In August 1952, he was signed by Southampton as a replacement for Tom Lowder who was out with appendicitis. McDonald made his debut for the "Saints" in the opening match of the 1952–53 season and scored four goals in the first eight matches, before a sudden loss of form led to the recall of Lowder following his return to health. In a match against Bury at The Dell on 20 September, McDonald took a penalty; the first attempt was kicked straight at Jimmy Kirk in the Bury goal and he then lofted the rebound over the bar.

McDonald spent most of the rest of the season relegated to the reserves, although he was tried at centre-forward for four matches near the end of the season, with no conspicuous success.

In the summer of 1953, McDonald was transfer-listed and sold to Southend United for a fee of £800. The following year, he retired from league football, and returned to live in Bournemouth where he obtained employment as a P.E. teacher.

Whilst playing for Weymouth, then in the Southern League, McDonald returned to The Dell in December 1956 for an FA Cup match – his team put up a gallant fight, only going down 3–2, with Southampton's Jimmy Shields being sent off following a foul on the Weymouth goalkeeper. (This match was the first time Cup football had been played at the Dell under floodlights.)

== Later career ==
McDonald subsequently moved to Elgin in Scotland before returning to England to live in retirement on the Isle of Wight.

== Honours ==
Fulham

- Football League Second Division champions: 1949.
