= George Gladwin =

English footballer

Personal information
- Date of birth: 28 March 1907
- Place of birth: Worksop, Nottinghamshire, England
- Date of death: Unknown
- Place of death: Worksop, Nottinghamshire
- Height: 5 ft 7 1/2 in (1.71 m)
- Positions: Right-half; inside forward

Senior career*
Years	Team	Apps	(Gls)
- Worksop Town
1930–1937	Doncaster Rovers	226	(22)
1937–1943	Manchester United	27	(1)
1939–1940	→ Barnsley (guest)	2	(0)
1940–1941	→ Wrexham (guest)	1	(0)
1941–1943	→ Doncaster Rovers (guest)	6	(1)
1942–1943	→ West Ham United (guest)	7	(0)
Total		269	(24)
- * Club domestic league appearances and goals

George William E. Gladwin (born 28 March 1907) was an English footballer. His regular position was at right-half or inside forward. Born in Worksop, Nottinghamshire, he played for Worksop Town, Doncaster Rovers and Manchester United, as well as guesting for Barnsley, Wrexham, Doncaster Rovers and West Ham United during the Second World War.

== Career ==
Born in Worksop, Nottinghamshire, Gladwin began his football career with local Midland League club Worksop Town while also working as a bricklayer. At the end of the 1929–30 season, Doncaster Rovers were short on funds and were unable to pay summer wages to many of their players; as a result, they were only able to retain 16 players for the 1930–31 season. Gladwin was among those brought in to augment the threadbare side and soon became a regular in the team, playing in either inside forward position or at right-half. In 1934–35, he was part of the Doncaster team that won the Third Division North title and they were promoted to the Second Division. The club avoided relegation in their first season in the second tier, but despite leading the league after two games in 1936–37, they were firmly rooted to the bottom of the table by the end of October and were relegated at the end of the season.

After 226 league appearances in which he scored 22 goals, Gladwin was able to escape the sinking Doncaster ship in February 1937, only to join a Manchester United team that was in similarly dire straits in the First Division for a fee of £3,000. Including his debut against Chelsea on 27 February 1937, in which he scored, Gladwin played in eight of Manchester United's last 12 matches of the season – the first four as an inside right and the next four as a right half. They still had a chance to avoid relegation in their final game against West Bromwich Albion on 24 April 1937; however, a 1–0 defeat meant that they finished in 21st place and were relegated to the Second Division, where they had spent the last five seasons. Gladwin made just seven appearances the following season, as Manchester United won promotion back to the First Division after finishing in second place, ahead of Sheffield United by virtue of a better goal average. He was more involved again in 1938–39, helping Manchester United in his 12 appearances to a 14th-place finish in the league, ensuring that the club would still be in the First Division at the outbreak of the Second World War.

During the war, Gladwin made guest appearances in the Wartime League for various clubs, including Barnsley (1939–40; two appearances), Wrexham (1940–41; one appearance), his old club Doncaster Rovers (1941–43; six appearances, one goal) and West Ham United (1941–43; seven appearances).

In 1945, he suffered severe injuries to his right leg while serving with the Royal Berkshire Regiment in Burma, bringing his football career to an end.

== Honours ==
=== Club ===
Doncaster Rovers

- Third Division North: 1934–35
