= 1937–38 FA Cup =

Tournament details
- Country: England; Wales

Final positions
- Champions: Preston North End (2nd title)
- Runners-up: Huddersfield Town

The 1937–38 FA Cup was the 63rd staging of the world's oldest football cup competition, the Football Association Challenge Cup, commonly known as the FA Cup. Preston North End won the competition for the second time, beating Huddersfield Town 1–0 after extra time in the final at Wembley.

Matches were scheduled to be played at the stadium of the team named first on the date specified for each round, which was always a Saturday. Some matches, however, might be rescheduled for other days if there were clashes with games for other competitions or the weather was inclement. If scores were level after 90 minutes had been played, a replay would take place at the stadium of the second-named team later the same week. If the replayed match was drawn further replays would be held until a winner was determined. If scores were level after 90 minutes had been played in a replay, a 30-minute period of extra time would be played.

== Calendar ==
Round	Date
Extra preliminary round	Saturday 4 September 1937
Preliminary round	Saturday 18 September 1937
First round qualifying	Saturday 2 October 1937
Second round qualifying	Saturday 16 October 1937
Third round qualifying	Saturday 30 October 1937
Fourth round qualifying	Saturday 13 November 1937
First round proper	Saturday 27 November 1937
Second round proper	Saturday 11 December 1937
Third round proper	Saturday 8 January 1938
Fourth round proper	Saturday 22 January 1938
Fifth round proper	Saturday 12 February 1938
Sixth round proper	Saturday 5 March 1938
Semi-Finals	Saturday 26 March 1938
Final	Saturday 30 April 1938

== Qualifying rounds ==
Most participating clubs that were not members of the Football League competed in the qualifying rounds to secure one of 25 places available in the first round.

The 25 winners from this season's fourth qualifying round were Scarborough, Walker Celtic, Blyth Spartans, Workington, South Liverpool, Wigan Athletic, Lancaster Town, Gainsborough Trinity, Scunthorpe & Lindsey United, Kidderminster Harriers, Wellington Town, Burton Town, King's Lynn, Ipswich Town, Kettering Town, Enfield, Tunbridge Wells Rangers, Dartford, Folkestone, Corinthian, Bromley, Guildford City, Yeovil & Petter's United, Cheltenham Town and Westbury United.

Of those, Walker Celtic, Bromley and Westbury United were the only clubs appearing in the competition proper for the first time, although King's Lynn had not featured at this stage since 1905–06. Additionally, after more than a decade of receiving direct byes to various stages of the main draw, Corinthian had successfully navigated the qualifying rounds for the first time.

Bromley was the most successful club from this season's extra preliminary round, defeating Beckenham, Darenth Park, Aylesford Paper Mills, London Paper Mills, Sittingbourne, Wimbledon and King's Lynn before going out to Scarborough in the second round proper.

== First round proper ==
At this stage 41 clubs from the Football League Third Division North and South joined the 25 non-league clubs that came through the qualifying rounds. Chester, Millwall and Notts County were given byes to the third round. To make the number of matches up, non-league Dulwich Hamlet and Walthamstow Avenue were given byes to this round, with Dulwich Hamlet having won the previous season's FA Amateur Cup.

34 matches were scheduled to be played on Saturday, 27 November 1937. Nine were drawn and went to replays in the following midweek fixture, with one of these going to a second replay.

Tie no	Home team	Score	Away team	Date
1	Darlington	0–2	Scarborough	27 November 1937
2	Bournemouth & Boscombe Athletic	0–0	Dartford	27 November 1937
Replay	Dartford	0–6	Bournemouth & Boscombe Athletic	1 December 1937
3	Barrow	0–1	Crewe Alexandra	27 November 1937
4	Bristol City	3–0	Enfield	27 November 1937
5	Rochdale	1–1	Lincoln City	27 November 1937
Replay	Lincoln City	2–0	Rochdale	1 December 1937
6	Watford	3–0	Cheltenham Town	27 November 1937
7	Walsall	4–0	Gateshead	27 November 1937
8	Gillingham	3–4	Swindon Town	27 November 1937
9	Doncaster Rovers	7–0	Blyth Spartans	27 November 1937
10	Wrexham	2–1	Oldham Athletic	27 November 1937
11	Tranmere Rovers	2–1	Carlisle United	27 November 1937
12	Wellington Town	1–2	Mansfield Town	27 November 1937
13	Kidderminster Harriers	2–2	Newport County	27 November 1937
Replay	Newport County	4–1	Kidderminster Harriers	2 December 1937
14	Accrington Stanley	1–1	Lancaster Town	27 November 1937
Replay	Lancaster Town	1–1	Accrington Stanley	1 December 1937
Replay	Accrington Stanley	4–0	Lancaster Town	6 December 1937
15	Bristol Rovers	1–8	Queens Park Rangers	27 November 1937
16	Northampton Town	1–2	Cardiff City	27 November 1937
17	King's Lynn	0–4	Bromley	27 November 1937
18	Brighton & Hove Albion	5–1	Tunbridge Wells Rangers	27 November 1937
19	Hull City	4–0	Scunthorpe United	27 November 1937
20	Crystal Palace	2–2	Kettering Town	27 November 1937
Replay	Kettering Town	0–4	Crystal Palace	2 December 1937
21	Exeter City	1–0	Folkestone	27 November 1937
22	Hartlepools United	3–1	Southport	27 November 1937
23	Burton Town	1–1	Rotherham United	27 November 1937
Replay	Rotherham United	3–0	Burton Town	29 November 1937
24	Port Vale	1–1	Gainsborough Trinity	27 November 1937
Replay	Gainsborough Trinity	2–1	Port Vale	1 December 1937
25	Yeovil & Petter's United	2–1	Ipswich Town	27 November 1937
26	Dulwich Hamlet	1–2	Aldershot	27 November 1937
27	Walker Celtic	1–1	Bradford City	27 November 1937
Replay	Bradford City	11–3	Walker Celtic	1 December 1937
28	New Brighton	5–0	Workington	27 November 1937
29	Torquay United	1–2	Clapton Orient	27 November 1937
30	Westbury United	1–3	Walthamstow Avenue	27 November 1937
31	Corinthian	0–2	Southend United	27 November 1937
32	York City	1–1	Halifax Town	27 November 1937
Replay	Halifax Town	0–1	York City	1 December 1937
33	Guildford City	1–0	Reading	27 November 1937
34	Wigan Athletic	1–4	South Liverpool	27 November 1937

== Second round proper ==
The matches were played on Saturday, 11 December 1937, with two matches postponed until the 15th. Four matches were drawn, with replays taking place in the following midweek fixture.

Tie no	Home team	Score	Away team	Date
1	Watford	3–0	Walsall	11 December 1937
2	Crewe Alexandra	2–2	New Brighton	15 December 1937
Replay	New Brighton	4–1	Crewe Alexandra	20 December 1937
3	Swindon Town	2–1	Queens Park Rangers	11 December 1937
4	Scarborough	4–1	Bromley	11 December 1937
5	Doncaster Rovers	4–0	Guildford City	11 December 1937
6	Wrexham	1–2	Bradford City	11 December 1937
7	Tranmere Rovers	3–1	Hartlepools United	11 December 1937
8	Accrington Stanley	0–1	Crystal Palace	11 December 1937
9	South Liverpool	1–1	Brighton & Hove Albion	11 December 1937
Replay	Brighton & Hove Albion	6–0	South Liverpool	15 December 1937
10	Clapton Orient	2–2	York City	11 December 1937
Replay	York City	1–0	Clapton Orient	15 December 1937
11	Exeter City	1–2	Hull City	11 December 1937
12	Mansfield Town	2–1	Lincoln City	15 December 1937
13	Cardiff City	1–1	Bristol City	11 December 1937
Replay	Bristol City	0–2	Cardiff City	15 December 1937
14	Newport County	2–1	Bournemouth & Boscombe Athletic	11 December 1937
15	Yeovil & Petter's United	2–1	Gainsborough Trinity	11 December 1937
16	Walthamstow Avenue	0–1	Southend United	11 December 1937
17	Rotherham United	1–3	Aldershot	11 December 1937

== Third round proper ==
The 44 First and Second Division clubs entered the competition at this stage along with Chester, Millwall and Notts County.

The matches were scheduled for Saturday, 8 January 1938. Seven matches were drawn and went to replays, with one of these requiring a second replay to settle the fixture. Scarborough and Yeovil & Petter's United were the last non-league clubs remaining in the competition.

Tie no	Home team	Score	Away team	Date
1	Birmingham	0–1	Blackpool	8 January 1938
2	Bury	2–0	Brighton & Hove Albion	8 January 1938
3	Preston North End	3–0	West Ham United	8 January 1938
4	Nottingham Forest	3–1	Southampton	8 January 1938
5	Sheffield Wednesday	1–1	Burnley	8 January 1938
Replay	Burnley	3–1	Sheffield Wednesday	12 January 1938
6	Grimsby Town	1–1	Swindon Town	8 January 1938
Replay	Swindon Town	2–1	Grimsby Town	12 January 1938
7	Middlesbrough	2–0	Stockport County	8 January 1938
8	West Bromwich Albion	1–0	Newcastle United	8 January 1938
9	Sunderland	1–0	Watford	8 January 1938
10	Derby County	1–2	Stoke City	8 January 1938
11	Scarborough	1–1	Luton Town	8 January 1938
Replay	Luton Town	5–1	Scarborough	12 January 1938
12	Doncaster Rovers	0–2	Sheffield United	8 January 1938
13	Tranmere Rovers	1–2	Portsmouth	8 January 1938
14	Tottenham Hotspur	3–2	Blackburn Rovers	8 January 1938
15	Brentford	3–1	Fulham	8 January 1938
16	Manchester United	3–0	Yeovil & Petter's United	8 January 1938
17	Norwich City	2–3	Aston Villa	8 January 1938
18	Bradford City	1–1	Chesterfield	8 January 1938
Replay	Chesterfield	1–1	Bradford City	12 January 1938
Replay	Bradford City	0–2	Chesterfield	17 January 1938
19	Millwall	2–2	Manchester City	8 January 1938
Replay	Manchester City	3–1	Millwall	12 January 1938
20	Crystal Palace	0–0	Liverpool	8 January 1938
Replay	Liverpool	3–1	Crystal Palace	12 January 1938
21	Chelsea	0–1	Everton	8 January 1938
22	Southend United	2–2	Barnsley	8 January 1938
Replay	Barnsley	2–1	Southend United	11 January 1938
23	Bradford Park Avenue	7–4	Newport County	8 January 1938
24	Huddersfield Town	3–1	Hull City	8 January 1938
25	Mansfield Town	1–2	Leicester City	8 January 1938
26	Swansea Town	0–4	Wolverhampton Wanderers	8 January 1938
27	Charlton Athletic	5–0	Cardiff City	8 January 1938
28	Arsenal	3–1	Bolton Wanderers	8 January 1938
29	Leeds United	3–1	Chester	8 January 1938
30	New Brighton	1–0	Plymouth Argyle	8 January 1938
31	York City	3–2	Coventry City	8 January 1938
32	Aldershot	1–3	Notts County	8 January 1938

== Fourth round proper ==
The matches were scheduled for Saturday, 22 January 1938. Four games were drawn and went to replays.

Tie no	Home team	Score	Away team	Date
1	Chesterfield	3–2	Burnley	22 January 1938
2	Preston North End	2–0	Leicester City	22 January 1938
3	Nottingham Forest	1–3	Middlesbrough	22 January 1938
4	Aston Villa	4–0	Blackpool	22 January 1938
5	Wolverhampton Wanderers	1–2	Arsenal	22 January 1938
6	Luton Town	2–1	Swindon Town	22 January 1938
7	Everton	0–1	Sunderland	22 January 1938
8	Sheffield United	1–1	Liverpool	22 January 1938
Replay	Liverpool	1–0	Sheffield United	26 January 1938
9	Manchester City	3–1	Bury	22 January 1938
10	Barnsley	2–2	Manchester United	22 January 1938
Replay	Manchester United	1–0	Barnsley	26 January 1938
11	Brentford	2–1	Portsmouth	22 January 1938
12	Bradford Park Avenue	1–1	Stoke City	22 January 1938
Replay	Stoke City	1–2	Bradford Park Avenue	26 January 1938
13	Huddersfield Town	1–0	Notts County	22 January 1938
14	Charlton Athletic	2–1	Leeds United	22 January 1938
15	New Brighton	0–0	Tottenham Hotspur	22 January 1938
Replay	Tottenham Hotspur	5–2	New Brighton	26 January 1938
16	York City	3–2	West Bromwich Albion	22 January 1938

== Fifth round proper ==
The matches were scheduled for Saturday, 12 February 1938. There were two replays, of which one went to a second replay.

Tie no	Home team	Score	Away team	Date
1	Chesterfield	2–2	Tottenham Hotspur	12 February 1938
Replay	Tottenham Hotspur	2–1	Chesterfield	16 February 1938
2	Liverpool	0–1	Huddersfield Town	12 February 1938
3	Sunderland	1–0	Bradford Park Avenue	12 February 1938
4	Luton Town	1–3	Manchester City	12 February 1938
5	Brentford	2–0	Manchester United	12 February 1938
6	Charlton Athletic	1–1	Aston Villa	12 February 1938
Replay	Aston Villa	2–2	Charlton Athletic	16 February 1938
Replay	Aston Villa	4–1	Charlton Athletic	21 February 1938
7	Arsenal	0–1	Preston North End	12 February 1938
8	York City	1–0	Middlesbrough	12 February 1938

== Sixth round proper ==
The four quarter-final ties were scheduled to be played on Saturday, 5 March 1938. There was one replay, in the Huddersfield Town–York City match.

Tie no	Home team	Score	Away team	Date
1	Aston Villa	3–2	Manchester City	5 March 1938
2	Tottenham Hotspur	0–1	Sunderland	5 March 1938
3	Brentford	0–3	Preston North End	5 March 1938
4	York City	0–0	Huddersfield Town	5 March 1938
Replay	Huddersfield Town	2–1	York City	9 March 1938

== Semi-finals ==
The semi-final matches were played on Saturday, 26 March 1938. Preston North End and Huddersfield Town won their matches to meet in the final at Wembley.

26 March 1938
15:00

Preston North End	2–1	Aston Villa

Bramall Lane, Sheffield

26 March 1938
15:00

Huddersfield Town	3–1	Sunderland
Pat Beasley 19'; Tolley Wienand 62'; Willie MacFadyen 75'		Eddie Burbanks 80'

Ewood Park, Blackburn
Attendance: 47,904

== Final ==
The 1938 FA Cup Final was contested by Preston North End and Huddersfield Town at Wembley. Preston, losing finalists the previous year, won by a single goal. After 29 minutes of extra time it was still 0–0 and BBC commentator Thomas Woodrooffe said "if there's a goal scored now, I'll eat my hat". Seconds later, Preston were awarded a penalty, from which George Mutch scored the winning goal; Woodrooffe kept his promise.

=== Match details ===
1938-04-30

Preston North End	1 – 0	Huddersfield Town
Mutch 119' (pen.)

Wembley, London
Attendance: 93,497
Referee: Arthur James Jewell

Preston North End	Huddersfield Town

== See also ==
- FA Cup Final Results 1872-
