= Billy Porter (footballer, born 1905) =

English footballer

Billy Porter (July 1905 – 28 April 1946) was an English footballer. His regular position was at full back. He was born in Fleetwood, Lancashire. He played for Windsor Villa, Fleetwood, Oldham Athletic, Manchester United and Hyde United, as well as guesting for several teams during the Second World War.
