= John Roach (English footballer) =

English footballer

John E. Roach was an English footballer. His regular position was at full back. He played for Manchester United, FC Sète, and Accrington Stanley.
