= Billy Wrigglesworth =

English footballer

Personal information
- Full name: William Herbert Wrigglesworth
- Date of birth: 12 November 1912
- Place of birth: South Elmsall, England
- Date of death: 11 August 1980 (aged 67)
- Place of death: Accrington, England
- Height: 5 ft 4 in (1.63 m)
- Position: Outside forward

Senior career*
Years	Team	Apps	(Gls)
- Frickley Colliery
1932–1934	Chesterfield	34	(6)
1934–1937	Wolverhampton Wanderers	50	(21)
1937–1947	Manchester United	27	(7)
1945–1946	→ Queens Park Rangers (guest)	1	(0)
1947	Bolton Wanderers	13	(1)
1947–1948	Southampton	12	(4)
1948	Reading	5	(0)
- Burton Albion
- Scarborough
Total		141	(39)
- * Club domestic league appearances and goals

William Herbert Wrigglesworth (12 November 1912 – 11 August 1980) was an English footballer who played as a forward. He played for Chesterfield, before joining First Division Wolverhampton Wanderers in 1934. He was top scorer for Wolves in the 1935–36 season with 13 goals. Wrigglesworth joined Manchester United in 1937. He spent 10 years with Manchester United but for most of that time there was no competitive senior football due to the Second World War, meaning that he was restricted to 37 matches for the club, scoring 10 goals. In 1947, he was transferred to Bolton Wanderers in a swap deal that involved goalkeeper Bill Fielding going to Old Trafford.

== Personal life ==
Wrigglesworth's younger brother Bob was also a footballer and was killed during the Second World War.

== Honours ==
Chesterfield

- Derbyshire Senior Cup: 1932–33
- Chesterfield Hospital Senior Cup: 1933–34

== Career statistics ==
Appearances and goals by club, season and competition
Club	Season	League			FA Cup		Other		Total	
Club	Season	Division	Apps	Goals	Apps	Goals	Apps	Goals	Apps	Goals
Chesterfield	1932–33	Second Division	11	1	0	0	1 (Note: Appearance in Derbyshire Senior Cup)	0	12	1
Chesterfield	1933–34	Third Division North	9	2	0	0	2 (Note: 1 appearance in Third Division North Cup, 1 appearance in Chesterfield Hospital Senior Cup)	0	11	2
Chesterfield	Total		20	3	0	0	3	0	23	3
Manchester United	1936–37	First Division	7	1	1	0	—		8	1
Manchester United	1937–38	Second Division	4	1	0	0	—		4	1
Manchester United	1938–39	First Division	12	3	2	0	—		14	3
Manchester United	1945–46	—	—		4	2	—		4	2
Manchester United	1946–47	First Division	4	2	0	0	—		4	2
Manchester United	Total		27	7	7	2	—		34	9
Southampton	1947–48	Second Division	12	4	2	0	—		14	4
Career total			59	14	9	2	3	0	71	16
