= Jack Cape =

English footballer

Personal information
- Full name: John Phillips Cape
- Date of birth: 16 November 1911
- Place of birth: Carlisle, England
- Date of death: 6 June 1994 (aged 82)
- Height: 5 ft 8 in (1.73 m)
- Position: Forward

Youth career
- St John's School (Carlisle)

Senior career*
Years	Team	Apps	(Gls)
?–1929	Penrith		
1929–1930	Carlisle United	15	(2)
1930–1934	Newcastle United	51	(18)
1934–1937	Manchester United	59	(18)
1937–1946	Queens Park Rangers	61	(12)
- → Carlisle United (guest)
1946	Scarborough Town		
1946–1947	Carlisle United	3	(0)
- * Club domestic league appearances and goals

John Phillips Cape (16 November 1911 – 6 June 1994) was an English footballer who played as a forward. Born in Carlisle, he played for Penrith, Carlisle United, Newcastle United, Manchester United, Queens Park Rangers and Scarborough, as well as guesting for Carlisle United during the Second World War.

== Career ==
After playing for Penrith, Cape joined his hometown club, Third Division North side Carlisle United at the age of 17, and made his debut a month before his 18th birthday. Three months later, First Division side Newcastle United paid £1,750 to sign him, but he struggled to break into the first team on a regular basis due to the form of Jimmy Boyd; nevertheless, he managed 53 appearances in all competitions over the course of his four years with Newcastle, scoring 20 goals in that time.

In January 1934, Second Division side Manchester United paid £2,000 to sign him, and he made his debut in a 3–1 defeat at home to Brentford on 27 January. He scored his first goals for the club a week later, scoring twice in a 4–1 away win over Burnley. He finished the season with seven goals in 17 appearances for Manchester United, including one in a must-win game against Millwall on the final day; Manchester United won the match 2–0 to finish in 20th place and avoid relegation to the Third Division. The team improved dramatically in the 1934–35 season, with Cape scoring eight goals in 21 league appearances as United managed a fifth-place finish, and they improved again in 1935–36, winning the Second Division title, although Cape did not play from January 1936. His next appearance came almost exactly a year later, and he made just three more before the end of the 1936–37 season, scoring one goal.

In June 1937, Cape joined Third Division South side Queens Park Rangers, but he only played two seasons before the outbreak of the Second World War. During the war, he made guest appearances for Carlisle, and after a brief spell with Scarborough Town when league football resumed, he returned to his hometown club permanently in October 1946; however, he only played three times during the 1946–47 season, at the end of which he retired and was appointed Carlisle's reserve team trainer.
