= George Mutch =

Scottish footballer (1912–2001)

Personal information
- Full name: George Mutch
- Date of birth: 21 September 1912
- Place of birth: Aberdeen, Scotland
- Date of death: 30 March 2001 (aged 88)
- Place of death: Aberdeen, Scotland
- Position: Inside forward

Youth career
- Avondale
- Banks O' Dee

Senior career*
| Years | Team | Apps | (Gls) |
| ?–1934 | Arbroath | | |
| 1934–1937 | Manchester United | 112 | (46) |
| 1937–1946 | Preston North End | 83 | (24) |
| 1946–1947 | Bury | 21 | (8) |
| 1947–1948 | Southport (player-trainer) | 14 | (2) |
| Total | | 230 | (80) |

International career
| 1938 | Scotland | 1 | (0) |

Managerial career
- 1948–1950: Southport (trainer)
- 1950–?: Banks O' Dee
- * Club domestic league appearances and goals

George Mutch (21 September 1912 – 30 March 2001) was a Scottish footballer. He played as an inside forward. Born in Aberdeen, Mutch started his football career with Avondale before joining Banks O' Dee. He then moved on to Arbroath, and signed for Manchester United in 1934. He played for United for four years, scoring 49 goals. After leaving, he went to Preston North End, where he helped the club win the 1938 FA Cup final, the first to be shown on television. In the last minute of extra time, Mutch was fouled. He scored the resulting penalty kick, which rebounded from the underside of the bar, to win the match for Preston North End. Mutch remained with Preston throughout the Second World War, but joined Bury at the cessation of hostilities. After a season with Bury, he joined Southport as a player-trainer, before taking up his training responsibilities on a permanent basis in 1948. He then returned to Scotland as the manager of Banks O' Dee in 1950.

He earned one cap for the Scotland national football team, a 1–0 win over England at Wembley Stadium on 9 April 1938.

== Honours ==
Preston North End

- FA Cup: 1937–38
