= Walter McMillen =

Northern Irish footballer

Walter S. McMillen (24 November 1913 – 11 May 1987) was a Northern Irish footballer. His regular position was as a defender.

Born in Belfast, he played for Distillery, Manchester United, Cliftonville Strollers, Cliftonville Olympic, Chesterfield, Millwall, Glentoran and Linfield and also won 7 caps for Ireland (Irish Football Association).
