= Ron Ferrier =

English footballer

Personal information
- Full name: Ronald Johnson Ferrier
- Date of birth: 26 April 1914
- Place of birth: Cleethorpes, England
- Date of death: 11 October 1991 (aged 77)
- Place of death: Cleethorpes, England
- Height: 5 ft 10 1/2 in (1.79 m)
- Positions: Centre forward; inside forward

Senior career*
Years	Team	Apps	(Gls)
- Grimsby Wanderers
1933–1935	Grimsby Town	0	(0)
1935–1938	Manchester United	18	(4)
1938–1947	Oldham Athletic	48	(25)
1947	Lincoln City	0	(0)
- Lysaghts Sports
- * Club domestic league appearances and goals

Ronald Johnson Ferrier (26 April 1914 – 11 October 1991) was an English footballer who played in the Football League for Manchester United in the 1930s, and later for and Oldham Athletic. He played for Plymouth Argyle as a wartime guest, and also represented Grimsby Town and Lincoln City before retiring as a player in 1947.

He also played/ and scored once as a guest player for Mossley in the 1939–40 season whilst stationed with the army at Ladysmith Barracks.

He died in October 1991 at the age of 77. He could play at centre and inside forward.
