= George Vose =

English footballer

Personal information
- Date of birth: October 4, 1912
- Date of death: June 20, 1981 (aged 68)

George Vose (4 October 1912 – 20 June 1981) was an English footballer and coach who played as a halfback. He played for Manchester United in the Football League, also representing Stalybridge Celtic, Altrincham and Runcorn. He was 5 ft 9 1/2 in (1.77 m) tall.
