= Jackie Wassall =

English footballer (1917–1994)

Personal information
- Full name: John Victor Wassall
- Date of birth: 11 February 1917
- Place of birth: Shrewsbury, Shropshire, England
- Date of death: April 1994 (aged 77)
- Height: 5 ft 8 in (1.73 m)
- Position: Forward

Senior career*
Years	Team	Apps	(Gls)
?–1935	Wellington Town		
1935–1946	Manchester United	45	(6)
1946–?	Stockport County		
- * Club domestic league appearances and goals

John Victor Wassall (11 February 1917 – April 1994) was an English footballer who played as a forward. Born in Shrewsbury, Shropshire, he played for Wellington Town, Manchester United and Stockport County.
