= Scott Duncan (footballer) =

Scottish footballer and manager

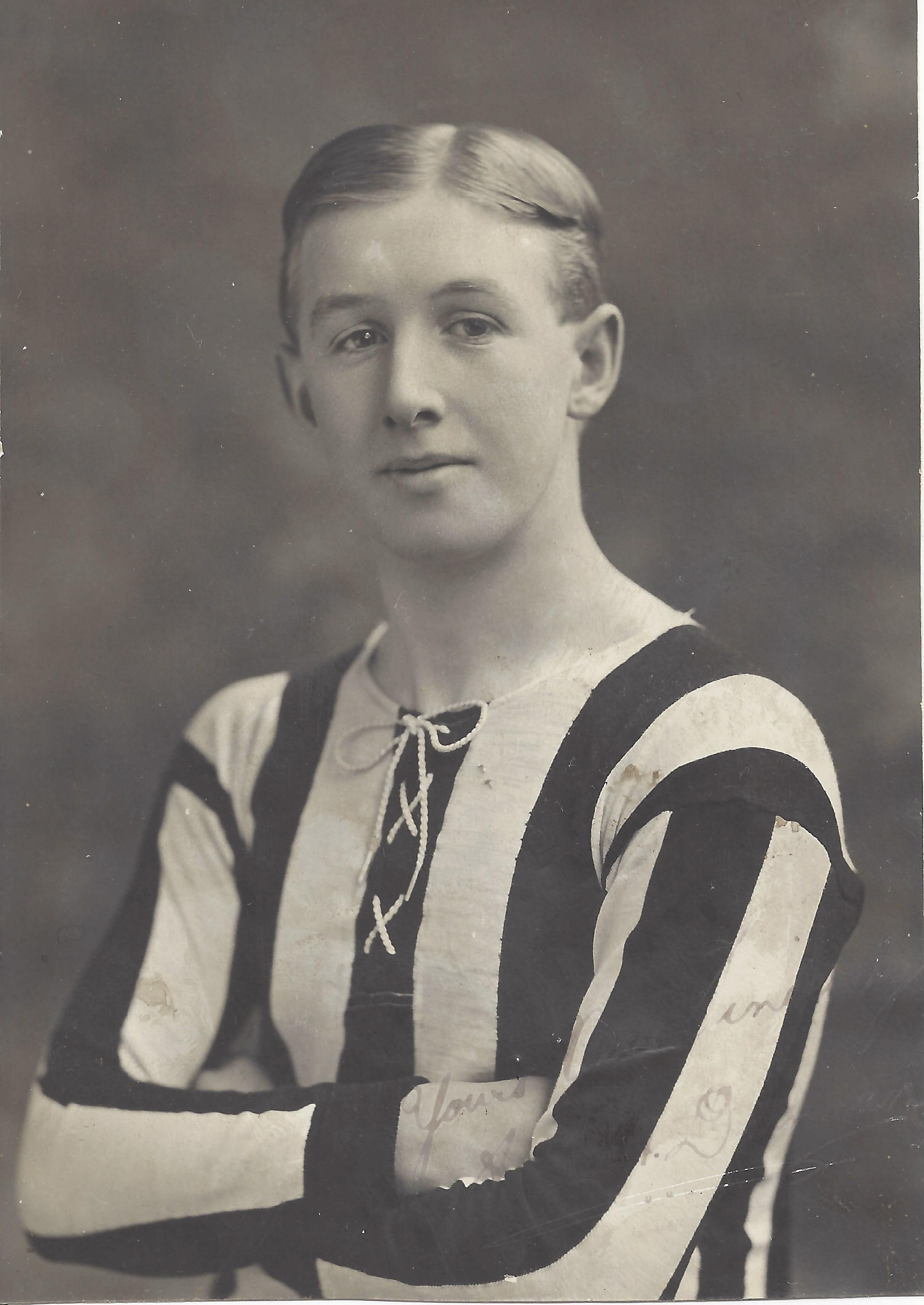
- Duncan with Newcastle United in 1908

Personal information
- Full name: Adam Scott Mathieson Duncan
- Date of birth: 2 November 1888
- Place of birth: Dumbarton, Scotland
- Date of death: 3 October 1976 (aged 87)
- Place of death: Helensburgh, Scotland
- Position: Outside right

Youth career
- Dumbarton Oakvale
- Dumbarton Corinthians
- Clydebank Juniors
- Shettleston Juniors

Senior career*
Years	Team	Apps	(Gls)
1906–1908	Dumbarton	30	(2)
1908–1913	Newcastle United	73	(10)
1913–1919	Rangers	101	(26)
	→ Celtic (guest)	2	(0)
1918–1920	Dumbarton	28	(2)
1920–1922	Cowdenbeath	?	(?)
1922–1923	Dumbarton	0	(0)

Managerial career
- 1923–1925: Hamilton Academical (secretary)
- 1925–1932: Cowdenbeath (secretary)
- 1932–1937: Manchester United (secretary)
- 1937–1955: Ipswich Town
- * Club domestic league appearances and goals

Adam Scott Mathieson Duncan (2 November 1888 – 3 October 1976) was a Scottish football player and manager, who played as an outside right. He made over 100 appearances for Rangers, played in England for Newcastle United, winning the Football League title in 1908–09. He also had three spells with Dumbarton, and played for Cowdenbeath and guested for Celtic. As a manager, he led Hamilton Academical and Cowdenbeath before going to England, where he managed Manchester United and then Ipswich Town, the latter for 18 years.

== Career ==
=== Playing career ===
Born in Dumbarton, Duncan was working as a law clerk when he joined his home-town club Dumbarton in 1906. He moved to Newcastle United in March 1908 for a fee of £200. A versatile forward, although primarily an outside-right, he scored 12 times in 81 league games for the Magpies and was a member of the 1908–09 English Football League championship winning side.

In May 1913, he returned to Scotland, moving to Rangers for a fee of £750. He remained with Rangers during World War I, in which he served as a signalling instructor in the Royal Field Artillery. He also played two wartime games for Celtic. In 1918 he rejoined Dumbarton and in the 1920 close season signed for Cowdenbeath. In 1922 he rejoined Dumbarton for a third time, but retired at the end of the 1922–23 season.

=== Managerial and coaching career ===
Duncan was appointed as secretary-manager of Hamilton Academical in the summer of 1923. He left in October 1925 to take over as secretary-manager of Cowdenbeath and had seven successful years at the club, keeping them in the Scottish First Division throughout his time in charge.

In June 1932 he was appointed as secretary-manager of Manchester United. Despite spending a lot of money on players, United were almost relegated to the Third Division in the 1933–34 season. However, Duncan turned things around and led United to the Second Division championship in the 1935–36 season. However, they were relegated the following season and, in November 1937, he resigned to become manager of Ipswich Town, who were then a Southern League side.

At the end of the 1938–39 season Ipswich were elected into the English Football League despite finishing third in the Southern League. Duncan remained with Ipswich Town as manager for 18 years, winning the Third Division (South) title in the 1953–54 season. However, Town were relegated the following season and Duncan stood down as manager in August 1955 season when Alf Ramsey took over. He remained as secretary for three further years.

He was honoured with a testimonial match at the end of the 1957–58 season against Norwich City at Portman Road, which Ipswich won 3–1.

He returned to live in Scotland in his retirement until his death in 1976, at the age of 87.

== Honours ==
=== As a player ===
Newcastle United

- First Division: 1908–09
- FA Charity Shield: 1909

=== As a manager ===
Manchester United

- Second Division: 1935–36

Ipswich Town

- Division Three South: 1953–54

== Managerial statistics ==
Team	Nat	From	To	Record					Refs
Team	Nat	From	To	G	W	D	L	Win %	Refs
Hamilton Academical	(Scotland)	July 1923	August 1925	88	36	13	39	40.9	
Cowdenbeath	(Scotland)	August 1925	June 1932	282	118	49	115	41.8	
Manchester United	(England)	June 1932	September 1937	223	88	85	50	39.5	
Ipswich Town	(England)	November 1937	August 1955	505	205	113	187	40.6	
Total				1,098	447	332	319	40.7	

== See also ==
- Played for Celtic and Rangers
