= Bert Whalley =

English footballer and coach

Personal information
- Full name: Herbert Whalley
- Date of birth: 6 August 1913
- Place of birth: Ashton-under-Lyne, Lancashire, England
- Date of death: 6 February 1958 (aged 44)
- Place of death: Munich, West Germany
- Height: 5 ft 9 in (1.75 m)
- Position: Half-back

Senior career*
Years	Team	Apps	(Gls)
1933–1934	Stalybridge Celtic	?	(?)
1934–1948	Manchester United	32	(0)
- * Club domestic league appearances and goals

Herbert Whalley (6 August 1913 – 6 February 1958) was a footballer who played as a half-back for Manchester United from 1934 to 1946, later serving on the coaching staff at the club. He died in the Munich air disaster in 1958, at the age of 44.

== Career ==
Born in Ashton-under-Lyne, Lancashire, Whalley began his career with nearby Stalybridge Celtic in 1933, before transferring to Manchester United on 7 May 1934. He made his debut on 30 November 1935 as a left-half in a 0–0 draw with Doncaster Rovers. The outbreak of the Second World War meant he was limited to 38 official appearances for the club; however, he played more than 200 times during the war, as well as making guest appearances for Oldham Athletic and Bolton Wanderers. He made just seven more appearances after the war, following the appointment of Matt Busby as manager.

In the latter years of his career, Whalley trained as a coach. In late 1947, while coaching a schoolboy side, he suffered an eye injury that put an end to his playing career. Busby visited him in the hospital and promised Whalley would always have a job at the club, and Whalley was soon appointed to the club's coaching staff, working predominantly with the youth teams. After Jimmy Murphy officially became assistant manager to Busby in 1955, Whalley was promoted to the role of chief trainer. In that capacity, he travelled with the team to Belgrade for a European Cup match against Red Star Belgrade in February 1958; on the journey back to England, the team's plane stopped in Munich to refuel. Bad weather meant the plane struggled to take off, and on the third attempt, it crashed through the end of the runway, killing 23 of the people on board, including Whalley, in what became known as the Munich air disaster.

== Legacy ==
Whalley was played by actor Dean Andrews in the 2011 television drama United, which centred on the successes of the Busby Babes and the decimation of the team in the Munich crash. In July 2021, Whalley was commemorated with a blue plaque at Stalybridge Celtic's ground, Bower Fold. In conjunction with the unveiling of the plaque, which was carried out by former Manchester United captain Bryan Robson, the Manchester United under-23s team played a friendly match against Stalybridge Celtic; Manchester United won the match 5–1.
