= Jack Warner (footballer, born 1911) =

Welsh footballer

Personal information
- Full name: John Warner
- Date of birth: 21 September 1911
- Place of birth: Tonyrefail
- Date of death: 1980 (aged 68–69)
- Height: 5 ft 7 in (1.70 m)
- Position: Wing half

Senior career*
Years	Team	Apps	(Gls)
1929	Treorchy Juniors		
1930	Trealaw Rangers		
1931	Treorchy Athletic		
1932	Aberaman Athletic		
1934–1938	Swansea Town	135	(9)
1938–1950	Manchester United	102	(1)
1951–1952	Oldham Athletic	34	(2)
1952–1953	Rochdale	21	(0)
Total		292	(12)

Managerial career
- 1952–1953: Rochdale
- * Club domestic league appearances and goals

John Warner (21 September 1911 – 1980) was a Welsh footballer who played as a wing half.

In his early days, he played for Swansea Town, and he went on to make 135 Football League appearances for the Welsh club before moving to Manchester United for 1938–39. He made over 100 league appearances for the Old Trafford club, and then transferred to Oldham Athletic.

Warner moved to Rochdale for the 1951-52 season, making 21 league appearances for the club. He then became manager of Rochdale for the 1952-53 season.

He also made two appearances for Wales, along with one wartime cap. His full caps came against England in 1936 at Ninian Park and against France in 1939, Wales's final international for seven years due to World War Two.
