= Bill McKay (footballer, born 1906) =

Scottish footballer

Personal information
- Full name: William McKay
- Date of birth: 24 August 1906
- Place of birth: West Benhar, North Lanarkshire, Scotland
- Date of death: 1977 (aged 70–71)
- Place of death: Manchester, England
- Height: 5 ft 7 in (1.70 m)
- Positions: Wing half; inside forward

Youth career
- Shotts Battlefield

Senior career*
Years	Team	Apps	(Gls)
1926–1927	East Stirlingshire	55	(23)
1927–1929	Hamilton Academicals	76	(22)
1929–1934	Bolton Wanderers	104	(17)
1934–1946	Manchester United	169	(15)
- Stalybridge Celtic
- * Club domestic league appearances and goals

William McKay (24 August 1906 – June 1977) was a Scottish footballer who played for Bolton Wanderers and Manchester United in the 1930s. He also played for East Stirlingshire, Hamilton Academical and Stalybridge Celtic. He helped Manchester United to win promotion out of the Football League Second Division in 1935–36 (as champions) and 1937–38.

== Career ==
McKay began his career with Shotts Battlefield, and played in the Scottish Football League for East Stirlingshire and Hamilton Academical, before moving down to England to play for Bolton Wanderers in December 1929. Bolton were a struggling First Division club, finishing 15th in 1929–30, 14th in 1930–31, and 17th in 1931–32, before being relegated in 21st-place in 1932–33. The "Trotters" finished one place and one point outside the Second Division promotion places in 1933–34. Remaining at Burnden Park for nearly four years, he scored 17 goals in 104 league appearances.

McKay joined Manchester United in March 1934. He helped United to avoid relegation from the Second Division at the tail end of the 1933–34 season and rise up the table to fifth position in 1934–35. He was part of the successful promotion campaign of 1935–36, as United won the Second Division title. However, they were relegated straight back down to the Second Division the following season, but McKay's four goals in four games at the end of the 1937–38 season helped the club regain to secure second place and therefore regain their First Division status. The "Red Devils" then finished 14th in 1938–39.

McKay's career was disrupted by the Second World War, which put an end to the Football League in the first half of the 1940s, though he did turn out for Manchester United in their wartime games. During the war, he also made guest appearances for Stockport County and Port Vale, playing in Port Vale's 4–2 defeat by rivals Stoke City at the Old Recreation Ground.

He was transferred to Cheshire County League club Stalybridge Celtic when football resumed in 1946, his 40-year-old body presumably not fit for action at Old Trafford. During his United career, he played in 182 games and scored 15 goals over all competitions.

== Career statistics ==
Appearances and goals by club, season and competition
Club	Season	League			FA Cup		Total	
Club	Season	Division	Apps	Goals	Apps	Goals	Apps	Goals
Bolton Wanderers	1929–30	First Division	22	5	1	0	23	5
Bolton Wanderers	1930–31	First Division	28	3	2	0	30	3
Bolton Wanderers	1931–32	First Division	13	0	1	0	14	0
Bolton Wanderers	1932–33	First Division	22	4	1	0	23	4
Bolton Wanderers	1933–34	Second Division	19	5	0	0	19	5
Bolton Wanderers	Total		104	17	5	0	109	17
Manchester United	1933–34	Second Division	10	0	0	0	10	0
Manchester United	1934–35	Second Division	38	3	3	0	41	3
Manchester United	1935–36	Second Division	35	0	3	0	38	0
Manchester United	1936–37	First Division	29	4	2	0	31	4
Manchester United	1937–38	Second Division	37	7	3	0	40	3
Manchester United	1938–39	First Division	20	1	2	0	22	1
Manchester United	Total		169	15	13	0	182	15

== Honours ==
Manchester United

- Football League Second Division: 1935–36
- Football League Second Division promotion: 1937–38
