= Billy Bryant =

English footballer

Personal information
- Full name: William Bryant
- Date of birth: 26 November 1913
- Place of birth: Shildon, County Durham, England
- Date of death: 25 December 1975 (aged 62)
- Height: 5 ft 10 in (1.78 m)
- Position: Outside right

Youth career
- Cockfield

Senior career*
Years	Team	Apps	(Gls)
1931–1933	Wolverhampton Wanderers	5	(0)
1933–1934	Wrexham	40	(11)
1934–1945	Manchester United	148	(44)
1941–1942	→ Chester (guest)		
1945–1946	Bradford City	0	(0)
- Altrincham
- Stalybridge Celtic
- * Club domestic league appearances and goals

William Bryant (26 November 1913 – 25 December 1975) was an English footballer.

Bryant started his career with Wolverhampton Wanderers after joining from his local side Cockfield, based in County Durham. He made his league debut for Wolves on 3 December 1932 in a 5–2 win over Blackburn Rovers, the first of a run of four starts. After one further appearance the following season, he left to join Wrexham.

He left Wrexham for Manchester United, and scored on his debut for them in a Second Division match against Blackpool on 3 November 1934. He went on to make 157 appearances for United, scoring 42 goals.

== Career statistics ==
Club	Season	League		FA Cup		Other		Total	
Club	Season	Apps	Goals	Apps	Goals	Apps	Goals	Apps	Goals
Manchester United	1934–35	24	6	2	0	0	0	26	6
Manchester United	1935–36	21	8	1	0	0	0	22	8
Manchester United	1936–37	37	10	2	0	0	0	39	10
Manchester United	1937–38	39	12	4	0	0	0	43	12
Manchester United	1938–39	27	6	0	0	0	0	27	6
Manchester United	Total	148	42	9	0	0	0	157	42
