= Walter Crickmer =

English football manager (1899–1958)

Personal information
- Full name: Walter Raymond Crickmer
- Date of birth: 17 December 1899
- Place of birth: Wigan, Lancashire, England
- Date of death: 6 February 1958 (age 58)
- Place of death: Munich, Germany

Managerial career
- Years: Team
- 1931–1932: Manchester United
- 1937–1945: Manchester United

Walter Raymond Crickmer (17 December 1899 – 6 February 1958) was an English football club secretary and manager.

He became Manchester United club secretary in 1926. He twice assumed managerial responsibility: from 1 April 1931 to 1 June 1932, and then again from 1 August 1937 to 1 February 1945.

Together with club owner James W. Gibson, he was responsible for instituting the youth development system at Manchester United. After 32 years of service as club secretary, Crickmer was killed in the Munich air disaster on 6 February 1958. He is buried at Stretford Cemetery.

He was married to Nellie Robertson from 1921 until his death. She outlived him by nine years, dying in 1967. They had one daughter, Beryl, who was born in 1921.

== Managerial statistics ==
Team	From	To	Record				
Team	From	To	G	W	D	L	Win %
Manchester United	April 1931	June 1932	43	17	8	18	39.53
Manchester United	November 1937	February 1945	76	30	24	22	39.47
