= Jack Rowley =

English footballer

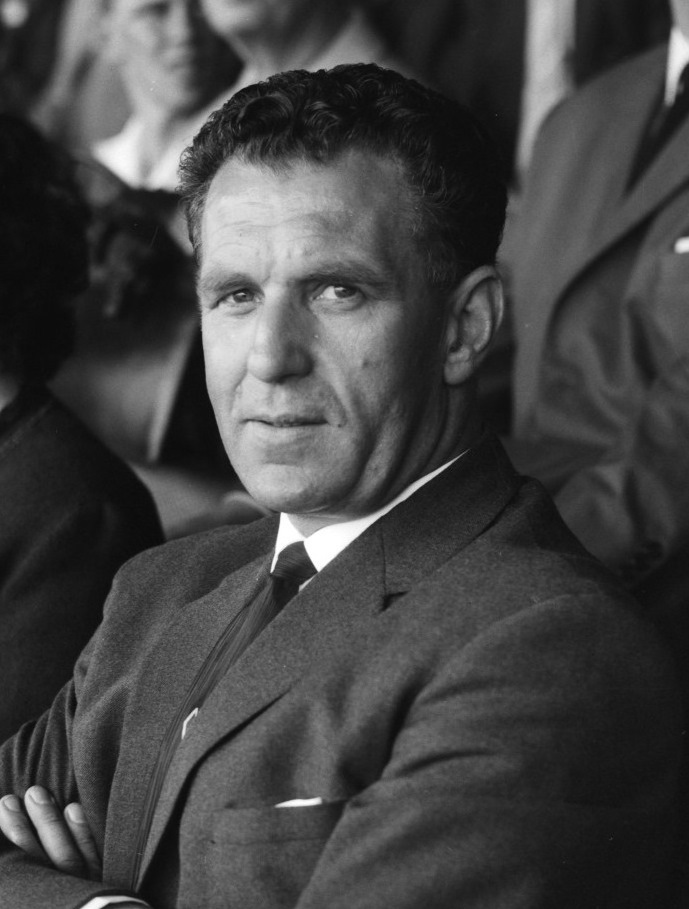
- Rowley in 1963

Personal information
- Full name: John Frederick Rowley
- Date of birth: 7 October 1918
- Place of birth: Wolverhampton, England
- Date of death: 28 June 1998 (aged 79)
- Place of death: Shaw and Crompton, England
- Height: 5 ft 9 in (1.75 m)
- Position: Forward

Youth career
- Wolverhampton Wanderers

Senior career*
Years	Team	Apps	(Gls)
1935–1937	Wolverhampton Wanderers	0	(0)
1936	→ Cradley Heath (loan)		
1937	Bournemouth & Boscombe Athletic	22	(12)
1937–1954	Manchester United	380	(182)
1954–1957	Plymouth Argyle	56	(14)
Total		458	(208)

International career
1948–1952	England	6	(6)
1949	England B	1	(3)

Managerial career
- 1955–1960: Plymouth Argyle
- 1960–1963: Oldham Athletic
- 1963–1964: Ajax
- 1966–1967: Wrexham
- 1967–1968: Bradford Park Avenue
- 1968–1969: Oldham Athletic
- * Club domestic league appearances and goals

John Frederick Rowley (7 October 1918 – 28 June 1998) was an English footballer who played as a forward from the 1930s to the 1950s, mainly remembered for a 17-year spell with Manchester United. He was nicknamed "The Gunner" because of his prolific goalscoring and explosive shooting, scoring 211 goals in 424 appearances for United. His younger brother, Arthur, still holds the record for the highest number of career goals scored in the Football League with 434.

== Career ==
Rowley started his professional career in 1935 with Wolverhampton Wanderers, although he never found a place in the first team. He soon moved on to Birmingham & District League club Cradley Heath, from where, in February 1937, he signed for Bournemouth & Boscombe Athletic, scoring ten goals in his first 11 games. His talent soon brought him to the attention of larger clubs and Rowley was purchased eight months later by Manchester United for £3,000. Still only 17, his debut for the club came on 23 October 1937 against Sheffield Wednesday. In his second game, he scored four goals against Swansea Town. By the time senior football was suspended due to the outbreak of World War II in September 1939, he had played 58 times for United, scoring 18 goals and helping them win promotion back to the First Division in his first season.

Initially bought as an outside left, he was to develop into a highly effective centre-forward in Matt Busby's first United team. He was part of the team that won the FA Cup in 1948, scoring two goals in the final, and the 1951–52 Football League. He became one of the club's few players to have scored five goals in a single game, when in February 1949 he scored five goals in an 8–0 win over Yeovil Town in an FA Cup tie.

Rowley is one of only four players in the history of Manchester United to score over 200 goals for the club, the others being Bobby Charlton, Denis Law and Wayne Rooney. He left the club in 1955 to become player–manager of Plymouth Argyle.

He later went on to manage Oldham Athletic, gaining promotion to the Third Division in 1963. From there, he went on to manage Dutch club Ajax for the 1963–64 season, before returning to Britain to manage Wrexham and Bradford Park Avenue, followed by a second spell at Oldham, where he finished his managerial career in December 1969.

Rowley was also capped six times for England scoring six goals, four of which came against Northern Ireland on 16 November 1949

Rowley died in June 1998, at the age of 79.

== Career statistics ==
=== Player ===
Appearances and goals by club, season and competition
Club	Season	League		FA Cup		Other		Total	
Club	Season	Apps	Goals	Apps	Goals	Apps	Goals	Apps	Goals
Bournemouth & Boscombe Athletic	1936–37								
Bournemouth & Boscombe Athletic	1937–38								
Bournemouth & Boscombe Athletic	Total	22	12					22	12
Manchester United	1937–38	29	9	4	0	0	0	29	9
Manchester United	1938–39	38	10	1	0	0	0	39	10
Manchester United	1945–46	0	0	4	2	0	0	4	2
Manchester United	1946–47	37	26	2	2	0	0	39	28
Manchester United	1947–48	39	23	6	5	0	0	45	28
Manchester United	1948–49	39	20	8	9	1	1	48	30
Manchester United	1949–50	39	20	5	3	0	0	44	23
Manchester United	1950–51	39	14	3	1	0	0	42	15
Manchester United	1951–52	40	30	1	0	0	0	41	30
Manchester United	1952–53	26	11	4	3	1	2	31	16
Manchester United	1953–54	36	12	1	0	0	0	37	12
Manchester United	1954–55	22	7	3	1	0	0	25	8
Manchester United	Total	380	182	42	26	2	3	424	211
Plymouth Argyle	1954–55	13	2	0	0	0	0	13	2
Plymouth Argyle	1955–56	16	6	0	0	0	0	16	6
Plymouth Argyle	1956–57	27	6	2	1	0	0	29	7
Plymouth Argyle	Total	56	14	2	1	0	0	58	15
Career total		458	208	44	27	2	3	504	238

=== Manager ===
Team	Nat	From	To	Record				
Team	Nat	From	To	G	W	D	L	Win %
Plymouth Argyle	(England)	February 1955	March 1960	238	93	52	93	39.08
Oldham Athletic	(England)	July 1960	May 1963	151	66	33	52	43.71
Ajax	(Netherlands)	1963	1964					
Wrexham	(Wales)	January 1966	April 1967	58	19	22	17	32.76
Bradford Park Avenue	(England)	March 1967	September 1968					
Oldham Athletic	(England)	October 1968	December 1969	57	16	14	27	28.07

== Honours ==
=== Player ===
Manchester United

- Football League First Division: 1951–52
- FA Cup: 1947–48
- FA Charity Shield: 1952

=== Manager ===
Plymouth Argyle

- Football League Third Division: 1958–59

Oldham Athletic

- Football League Fourth Division promotion: 1962–63
