= James W. Gibson =

British businessman

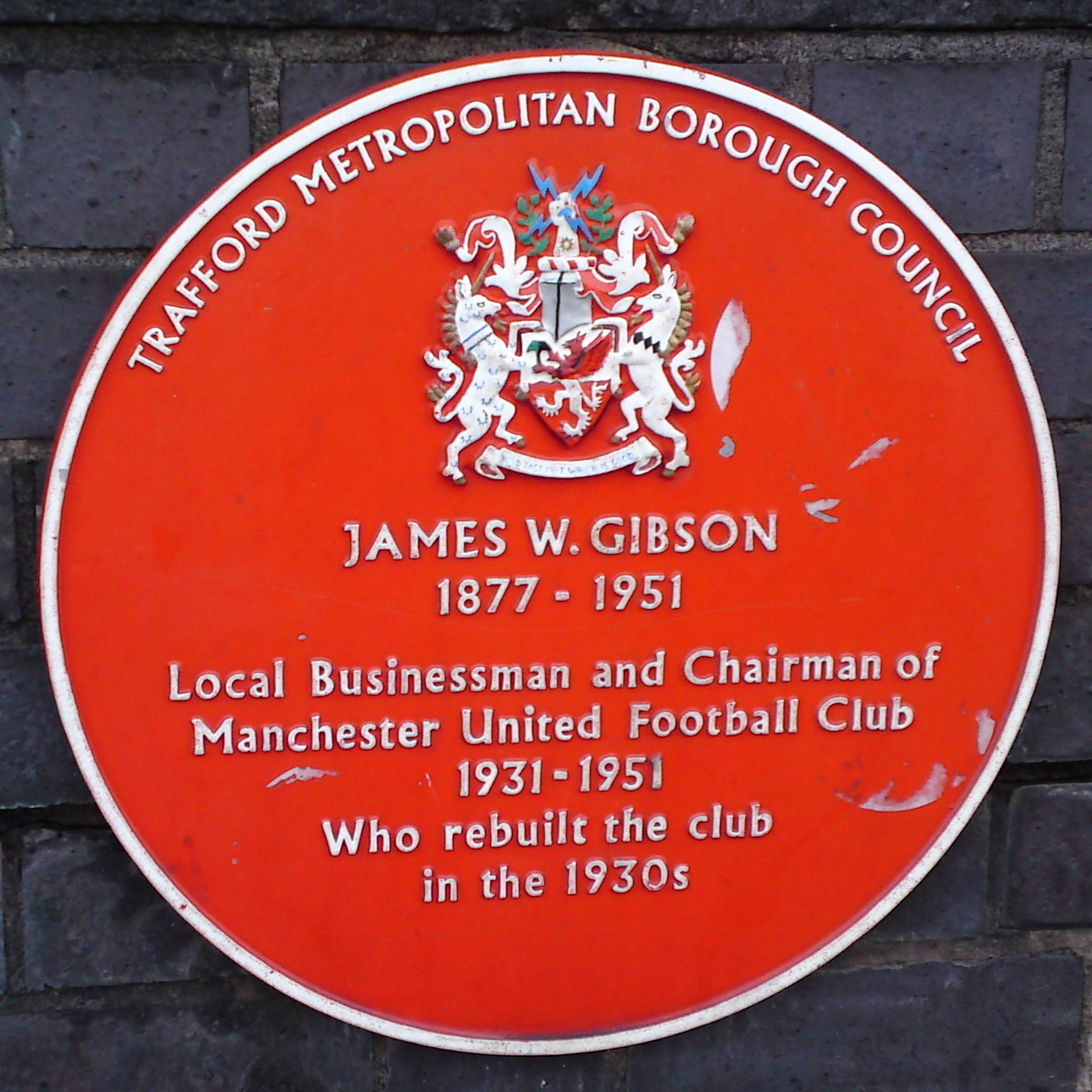
A plaque on Sir Matt Busby Way commemorating Gibson's work as chairman of Manchester United from 1931 to 1951

James William Gibson (21 October 1877 – September 1951) was a British businessman who was the owner of the English football club Manchester United from December 1931 until his death in September 1951.

== Biography ==
=== Early life ===
The son of a successful uniform manufacturer, Gibson was born in Salford but brought up in central Manchester with his younger brother, John, and their sister, Florence, who died at a very early age. Tragedy befell the family again when Gibson was 14, as both his parents contracted fatal illnesses and the children went to live with their paternal grandparents. The grandparents died soon after, and the children were taken in by their uncle, their mother's only brother, William Fell. Fell was himself a successful businessman, like the boys' father, and had become a famous corn merchant on the outskirts of the city. Gibson began working with Fell in the corn business, immersing himself in all aspects of the company, but excelling in sales.

=== Into the clothing industry ===
Just after the start of the 20th century, after 15 years working for his uncle, Gibson decided to set up his own company. The textiles industry in and around Manchester was booming at the time, so Gibson followed his father into the uniform business, and since his father's name was still fairly well known in the city, he quickly built up a portfolio of contacts. The business grew steadily for several years, before the outbreak of the First World War earned Gibson his first major contract; the company began manufacturing uniforms for the British Armed Forces on a daily basis. This deal forged Gibson's reputation and by the end of the war he had become a well-respected entrepreneur.

However, the end of the war also meant that the company was now selling less uniforms and needed a new source of revenue. Not content with anything small-scale, Gibson approached the city corporations with an offer to provide uniforms for the tram drivers and conductors, selling the idea that they would be proud to wear such a uniform. The idea proved a success, and Gibson was able to diversify into other fields outside clothing. Nevertheless, he continued to concentrate on the uniform business and, in 1924, he entered into a partnership with Messrs F. Jones and R. H. H. Briggs, forming Briggs, Jones and Gibson. They relocated the business to larger premises on Lostock Street, near Oldham Road in Collyhurst, and the combined talents of the three men meant further expansion, both in Manchester and in other cities. However, in 1926, Jones died, putting the business under pressure. For reasons thought to be related to his age, Briggs also decided to sell his share in the business, and Gibson took sole control of the company. This coincided with the onset of the Great Depression, which meant a massive downturn in trade. Gibson's interests in other fields meant that the business was able to survive the Depression.

=== Manchester United ===
A Salfordian by birth, Gibson was living in Old Trafford by 1911 and was aware of his 'local' football team, who had just moved into their new stadium in the district, although whether he was an active supporter at this time is not known.

Unlike the wealthy Gibson, Manchester United F.C. was being affected greatly by the Great Depression around the start of the 1930s. Their previous owner, John Henry Davies had died in 1927 after 25 years at the club. They had won the FA Cup and two league titles during the first 10 years of his chairmanship, but were less successful during the 1920s, enduring a spell in the Second Division, and were thousands of pounds in debt. In 1931, just before Gibson took over, United were relegated to the Second Division again.

Gibson injected around £40,000 more funds into the team during the Great Depression, and after five seasons in the Second Division, they were promoted as champions. Despite being relegated straight back from the First Division, they returned at the first attempt.

When Old Trafford was wrecked by German air raids on 11 March 1941, he also funded the rebuilding of the stadium, which was completed in 1949, and started the United Youth Academy that produced the great Busby Babes side of the mid-to-late 1950s. He also oversaw the arrival of players including Johnny Carey and Jack Rowley, who played a crucial part in the club’s successes of the late 1940s and early 1950s.

At the end of the Second World War, he appointed Matt Busby as manager, but only lived to see Busby guide the club to one major trophy – the 1948 FA Cup – as he died in 1951, a year before they won their first top division title since 1911. He did not live to see the revolution of the Busby Babes later in the decade.
