= List of Manchester United F.C. players (25–99 appearances) =

Manchester United players with 25 to 99 appearances

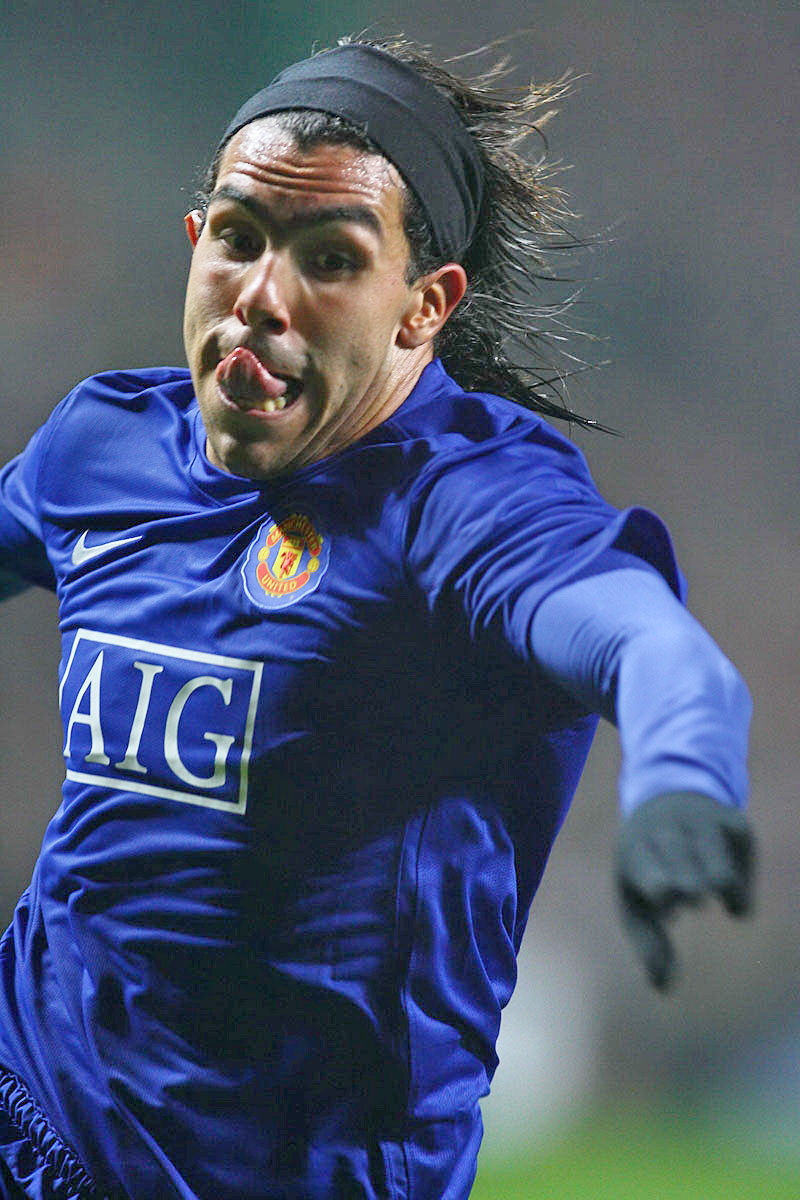
Carlos Tevez made 99 appearances in two seasons with Manchester United. He is the only United player to make exactly 99 appearances for the club.

Manchester United Football Club is an English association football club based in Old Trafford, Greater Manchester. The club was formed in Newton Heath in 1878 as Newton Heath LYR F.C., and played their first competitive match in October 1886, when they entered the First Round of the 1886–87 FA Cup. The club was renamed Manchester United F.C. in 1902, and they moved to Old Trafford in 1910. The club won its first significant trophy in 1908, the First Division title. Since then, the club has won a further 19 league titles, along with 13 FA Cups and six League Cups, among many other honours. They have also been crowned champions of Europe on three occasions by winning the European Cup. The club was one of 22 teams in the Premier League when it was formed in 1992. They experienced the most successful period in their history under the management of Alex Ferguson, who guided the team to 13 league titles in 21 years.

Since playing their first competitive match, 989 players have appeared in competitive first-team matches for the club, many of whom have played between 25 and 99 matches (including substitute appearances). Carlos Tevez fell one short of 100 appearances for Manchester United after he joined the club as a free agent in August 2007 before departing for rivals Manchester City in 2009, and is the only player to make exactly 99 appearances for the club. Billy Whelan, Arnold Mühren and Diego Forlán all played 98 matches in all competitions for Manchester United. Five players have appeared in exactly 25 matches for the club: Alex Menzies, Tom Homer, Scott McGarvey, Peter Barnes, and Facundo Pellistri.

Darren Ferguson, Jesper Blomqvist, Gabriel Heinze, and Owen Hargreaves are among the former players who have been awarded league medals; Hargreaves was also in Manchester United's victorious starting XI for the 2008 UEFA Champions League final. A number of other notable players have made between 25 and 99 appearances for the club, Michael Owen, a Ballon d'Or winner with rivals Liverpool, joined Manchester United late in his career and appeared in 52 matches. Laurent Blanc, Bastian Schweinsteiger, Zlatan Ibrahimović, Alexis Sánchez, Edinson Cavani, and Raphaël Varane are among the players who had decorated careers before joining Manchester United and reaching the 25 appearance milestone. Some players who were on loans with the club, such as Wout Weghorst and Sofyan Amrabat, have reached the 25 appearance milestone.

As of 18 October 2026, a total of 259 players have played between 25 and 99 competitive matches for the club. Among current players, Moroccan defender Noussair Mazraoui is the closest to 100 appearances; he has played in 84 matches for Manchester United. The most recent player to make his 25th appearance for the club is English defender Ayden Heaven, who reached that milestone on 22 August 2026.

== List of players ==
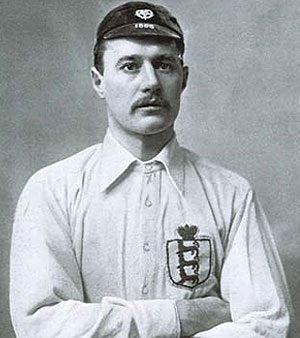
John Sutcliffe made 28 appearances for Manchester United.

Billy Grassam scored 14 goals for Manchester United.

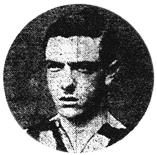
Oscar Linkson participated in Manchester United's first FA Cup-winning side in 1909.

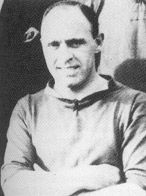
Fred Hopkin made 74 appearances for with Manchester United.

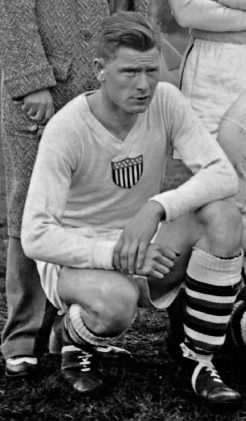
Jim Brown made 42 appearances across for United and was the club's first player to represent a nation from outside the British Isles, representing the United States in the 1930 World Cup.

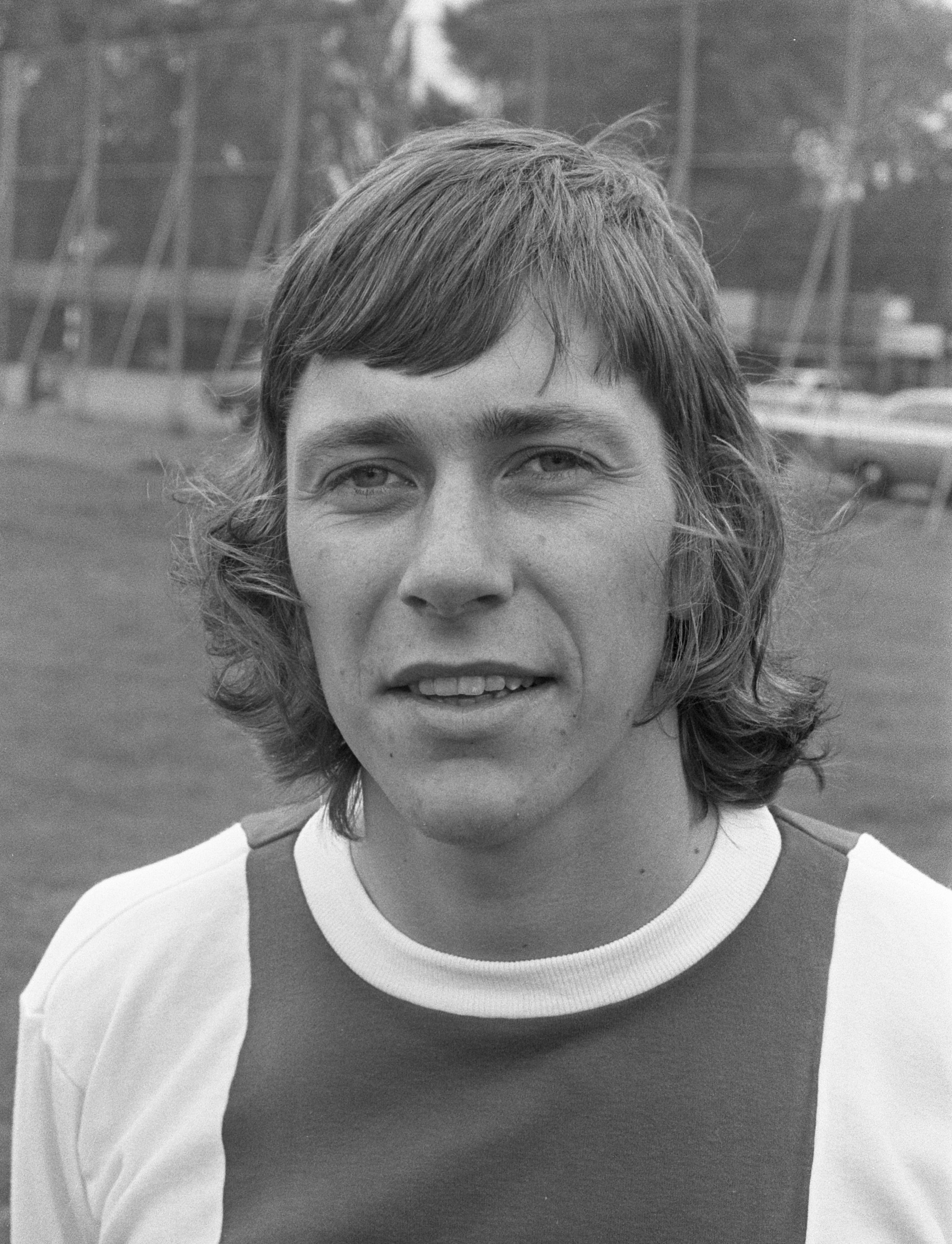
Arnold Mühren made 98 appearances for Manchester United.

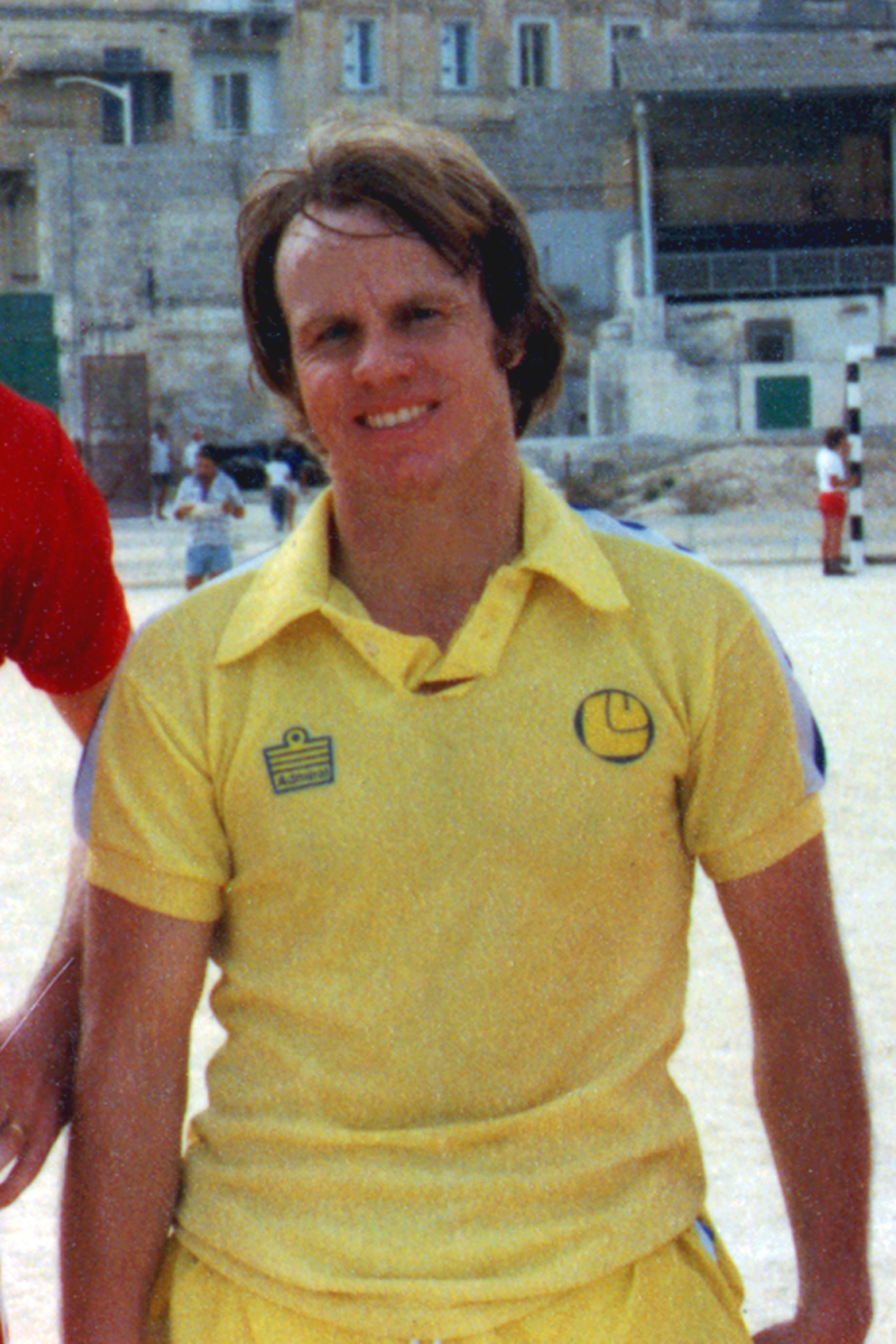
Arthur Graham made 52 appearances for Manchester United.

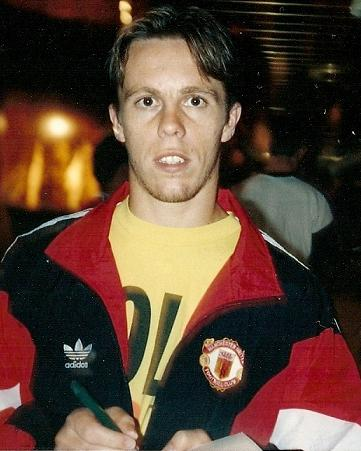
Russell Beardsmore won the 1991 European Super Cup medal as a non-playing substitute.

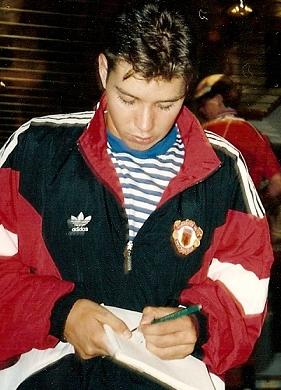
Darren Ferguson made 30 appearances, all of which during his father's managerial tenure.

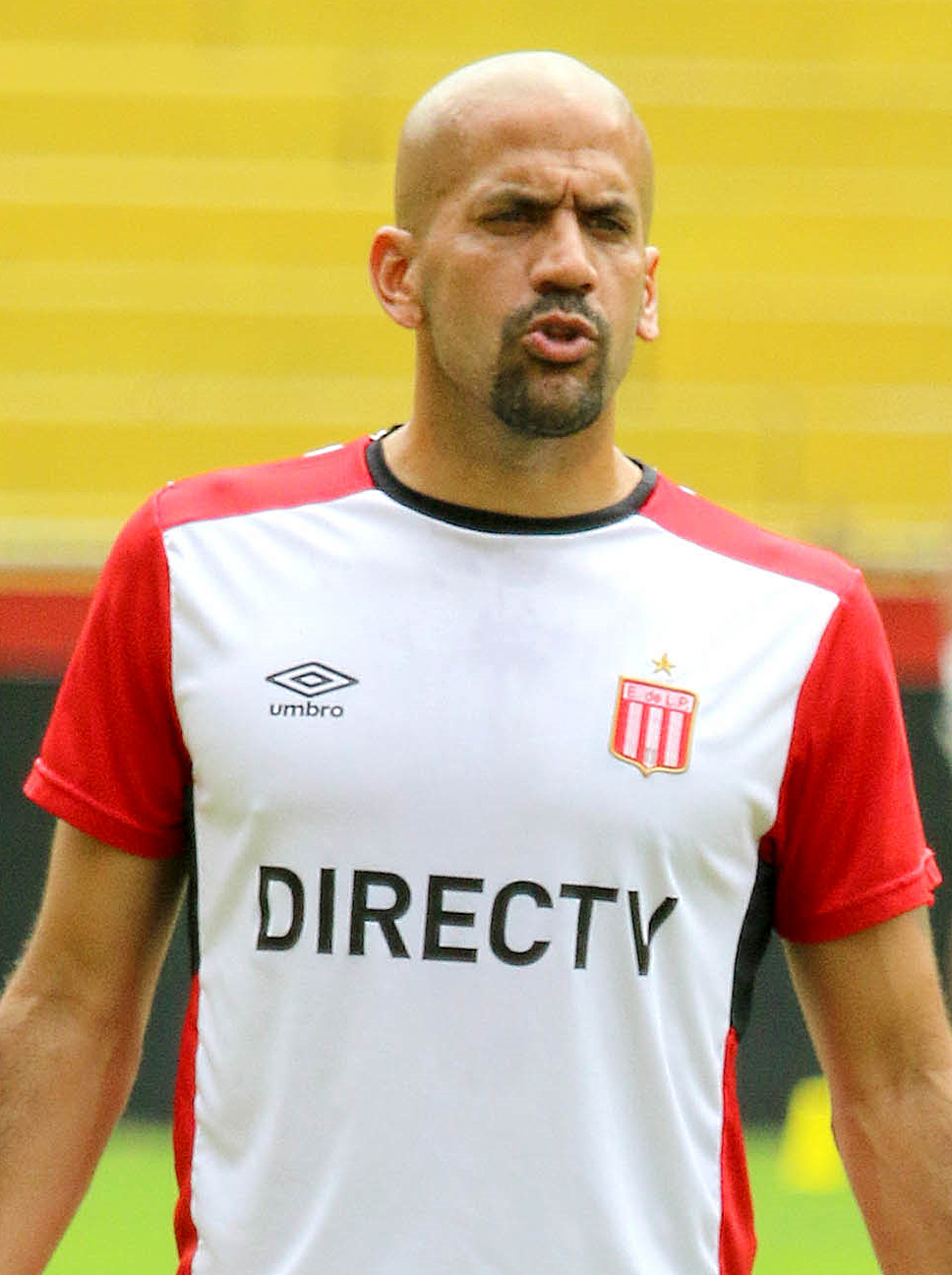
Juan Sebastián Verón made 82 appearances in two seasons with Manchester United. He cost the club £28.1 million, at that time the highest transfer fee ever paid by a British club.

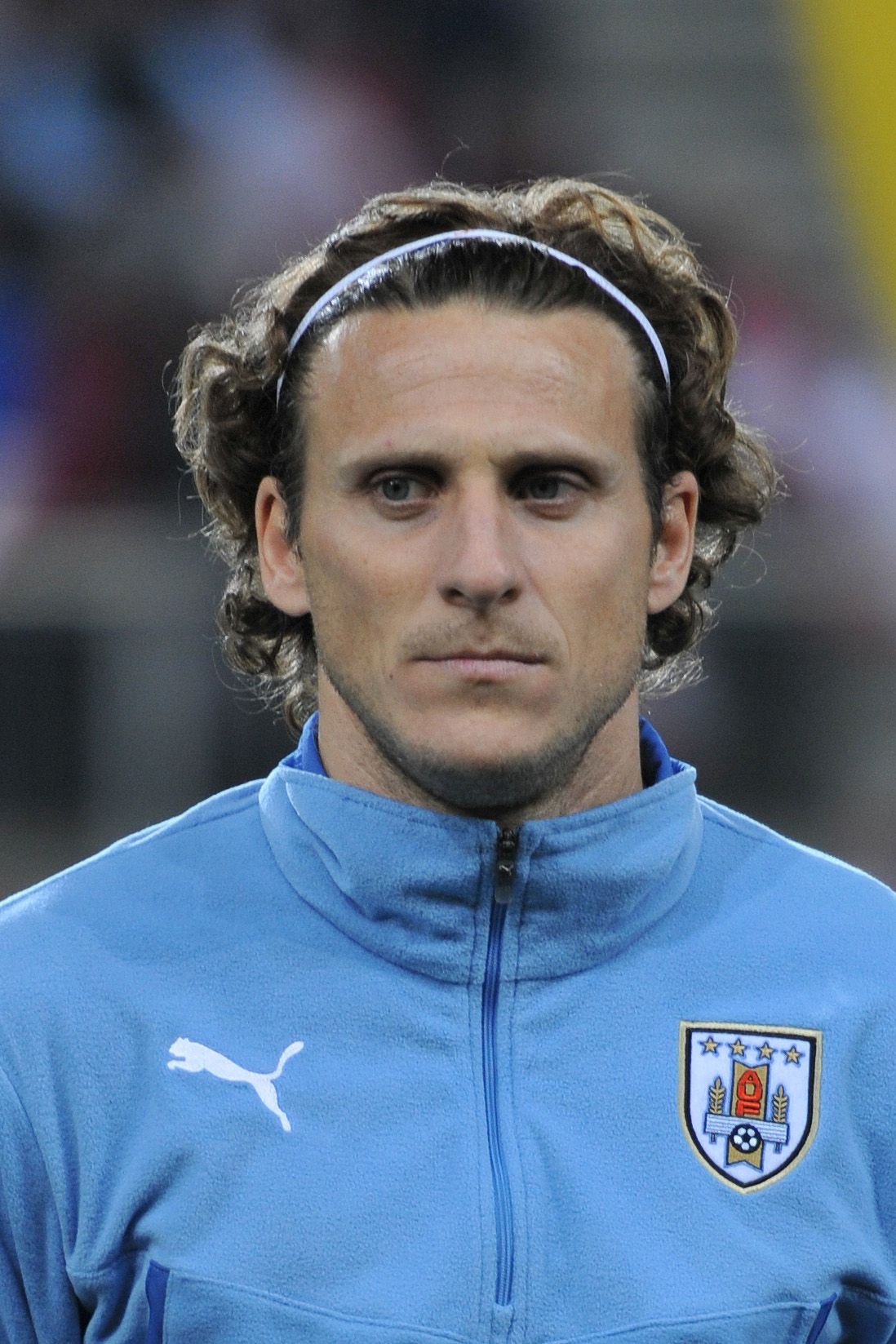
Diego Forlán made 98 appearances for Manchester United.

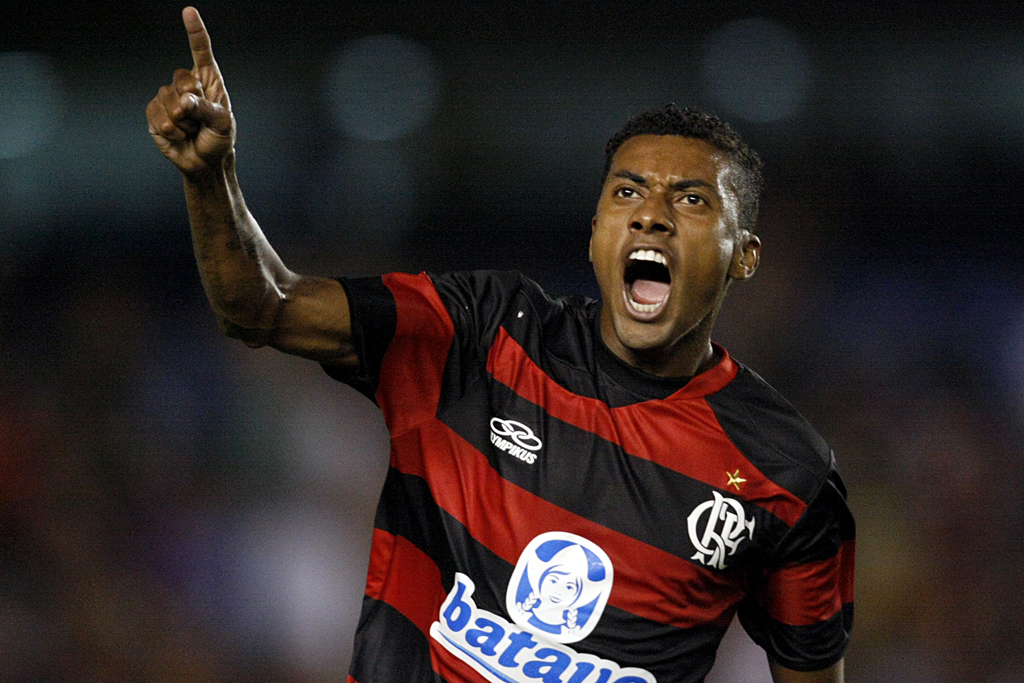
Kléberson made 30 appearances for Manchester United.

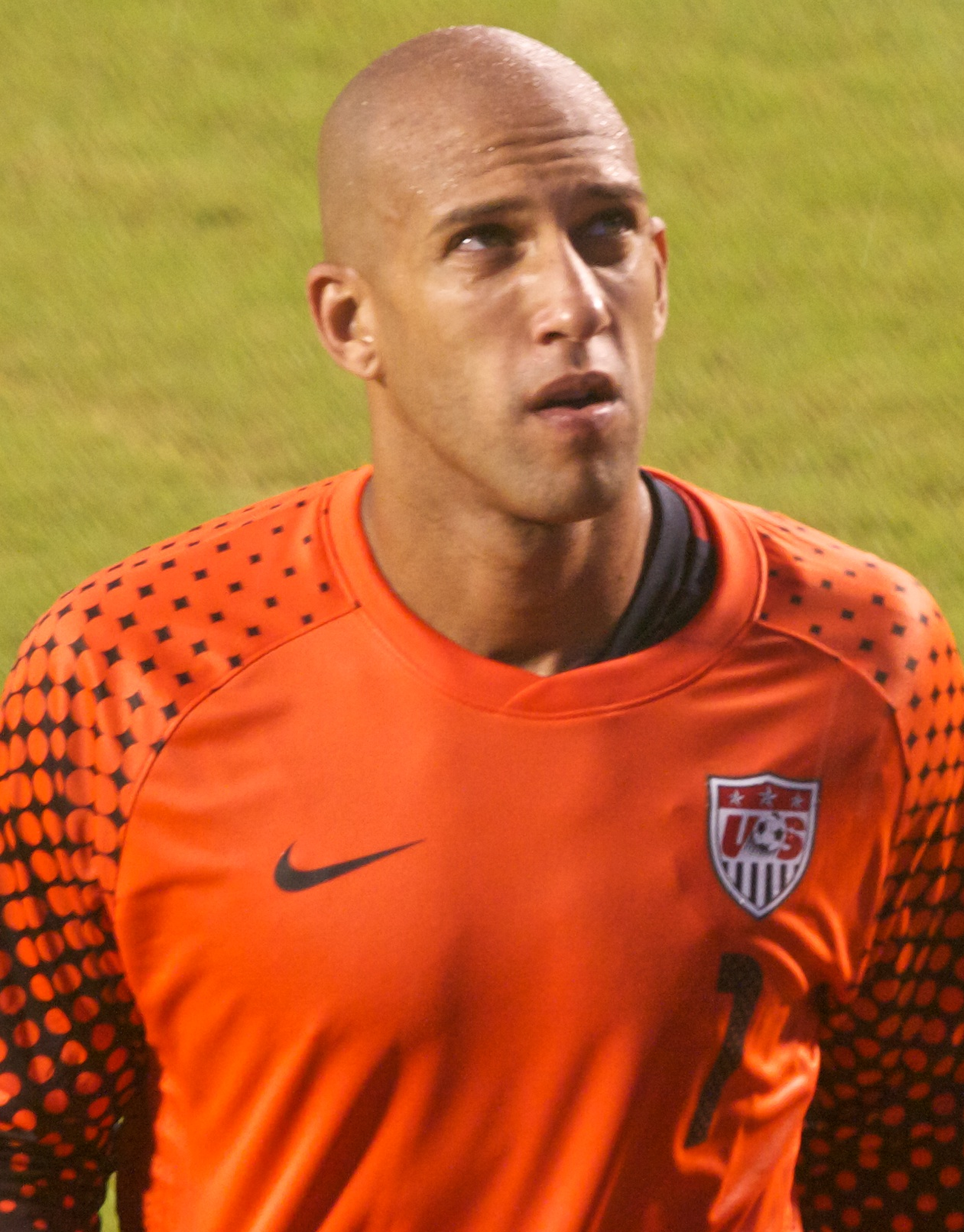
Tim Howard made 77 appearances for Manchester United.

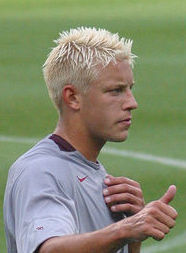
Alan Smith made 93 appearances for Manchester United.

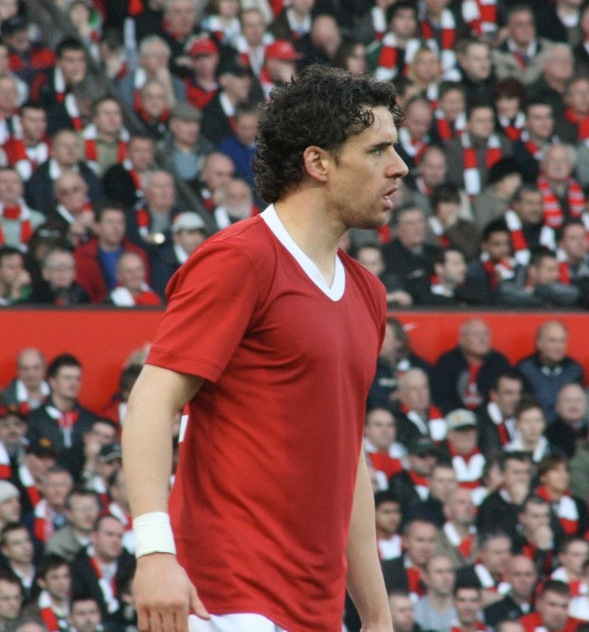
Owen Hargreaves made 39 appearances for Manchester United.

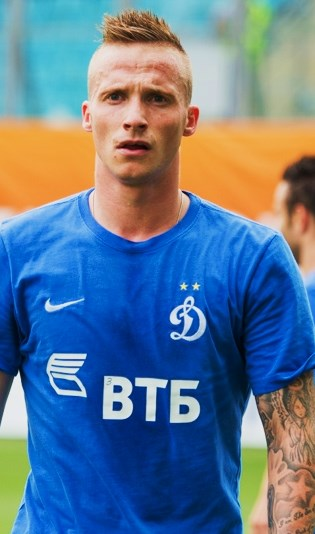
Alexander Büttner made 28 appearances for Manchester United.

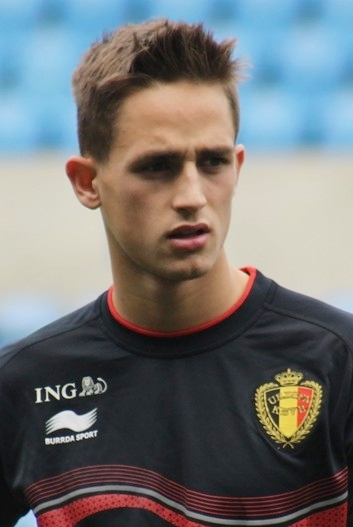
Adnan Januzaj made 63 appearances for Manchester United.

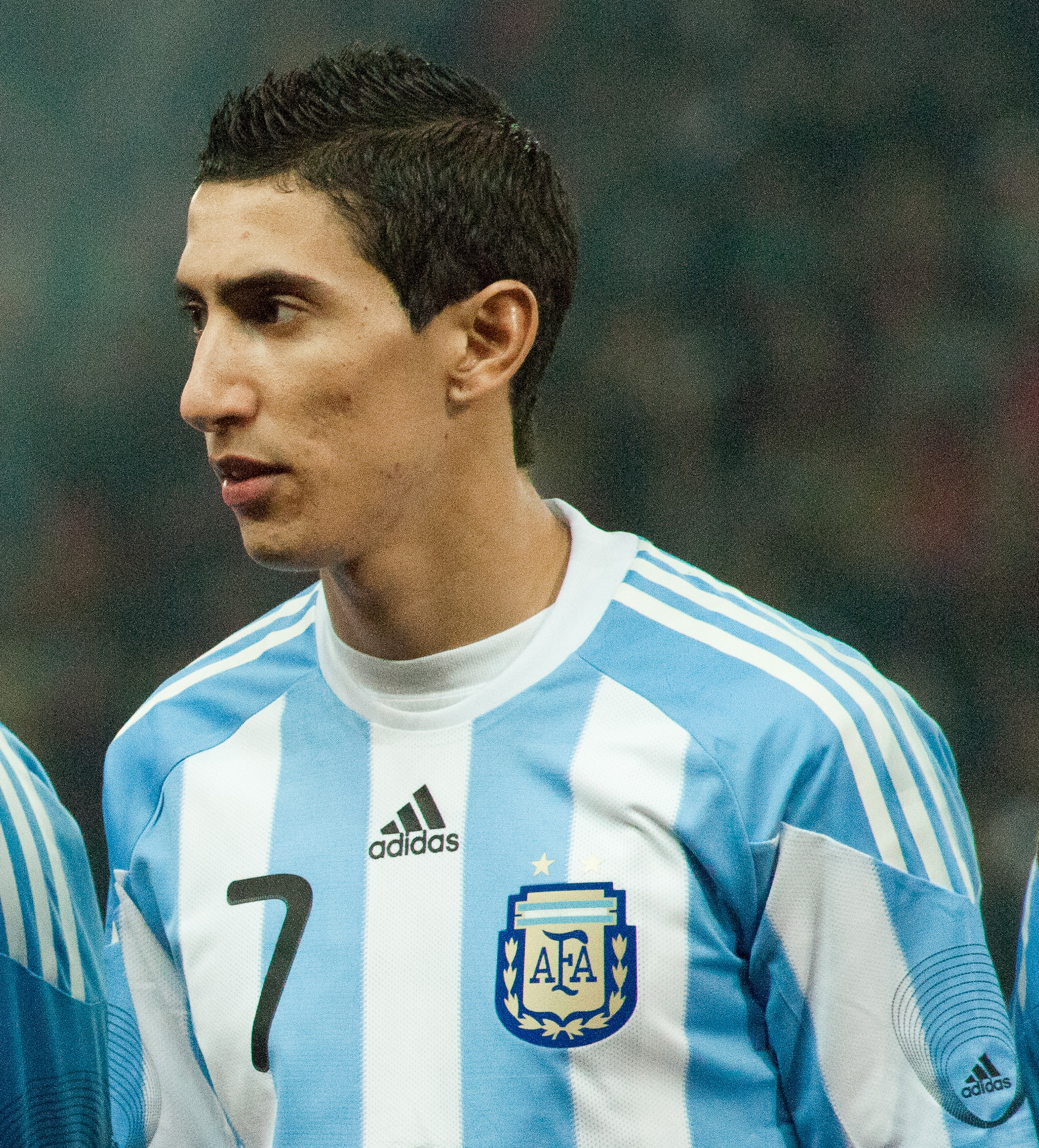
Ángel Di María made 32 appearances in one season with Manchester United. He cost the club £59.7 million, the then-highest transfer fee ever paid by a British club.

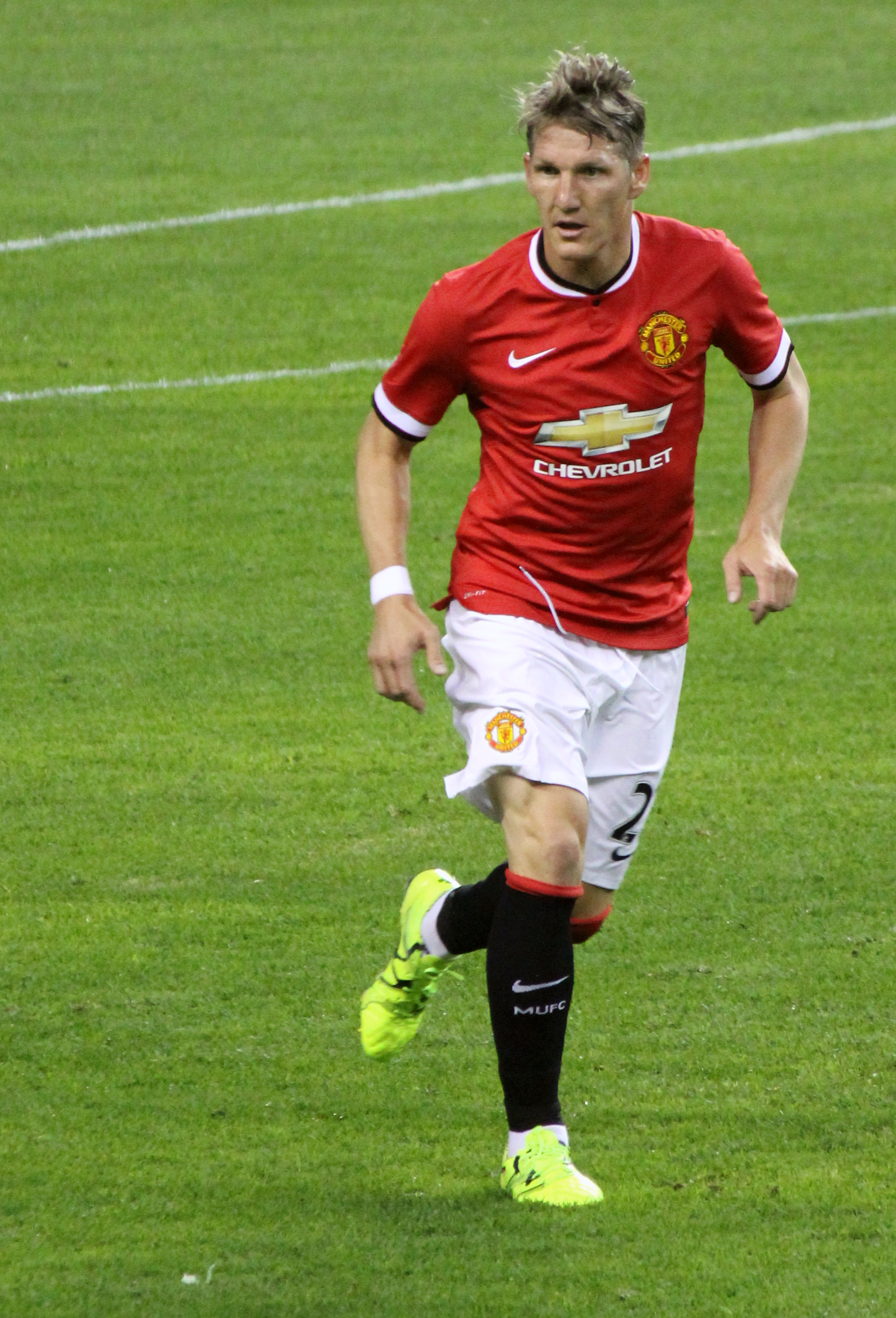
Bastian Schweinsteiger made 35 appearances for Manchester United and was the club's first senior German player.

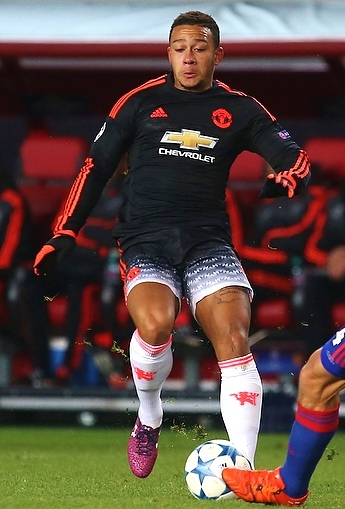
Memphis Depay made 53 appearances for Manchester United.

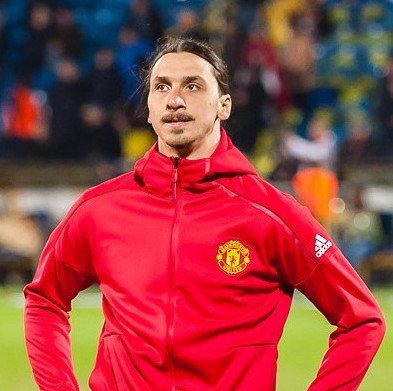
Zlatan Ibrahimović made 53 appearances for Manchester United.

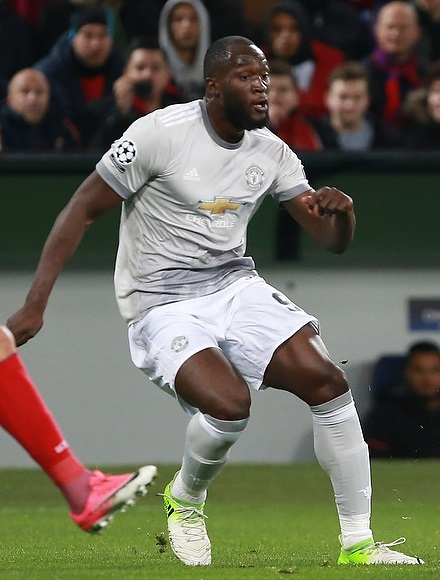
Romelu Lukaku made 96 appearances for Manchester United.

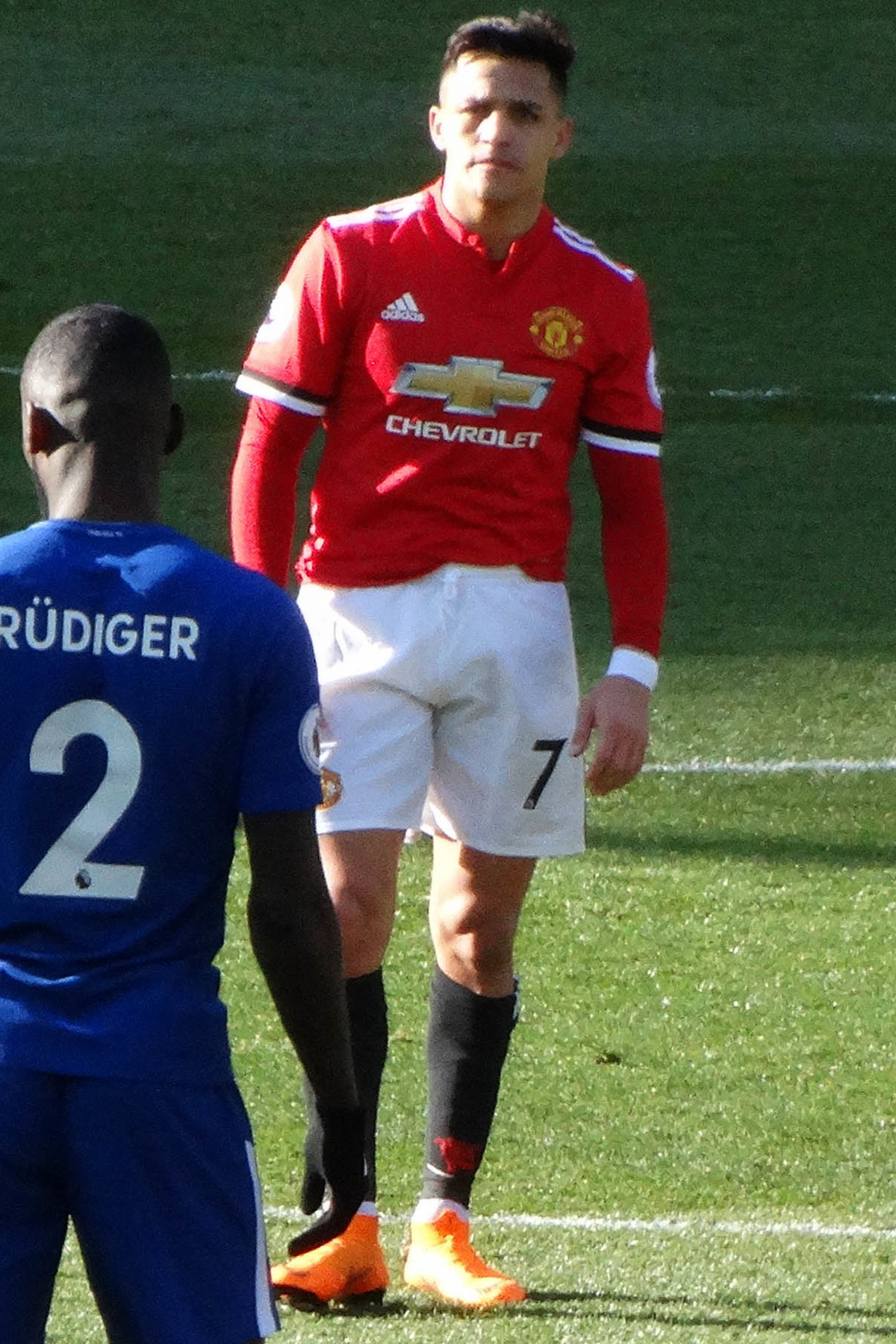
Alexis Sánchez made 45 appearances for Manchester United.

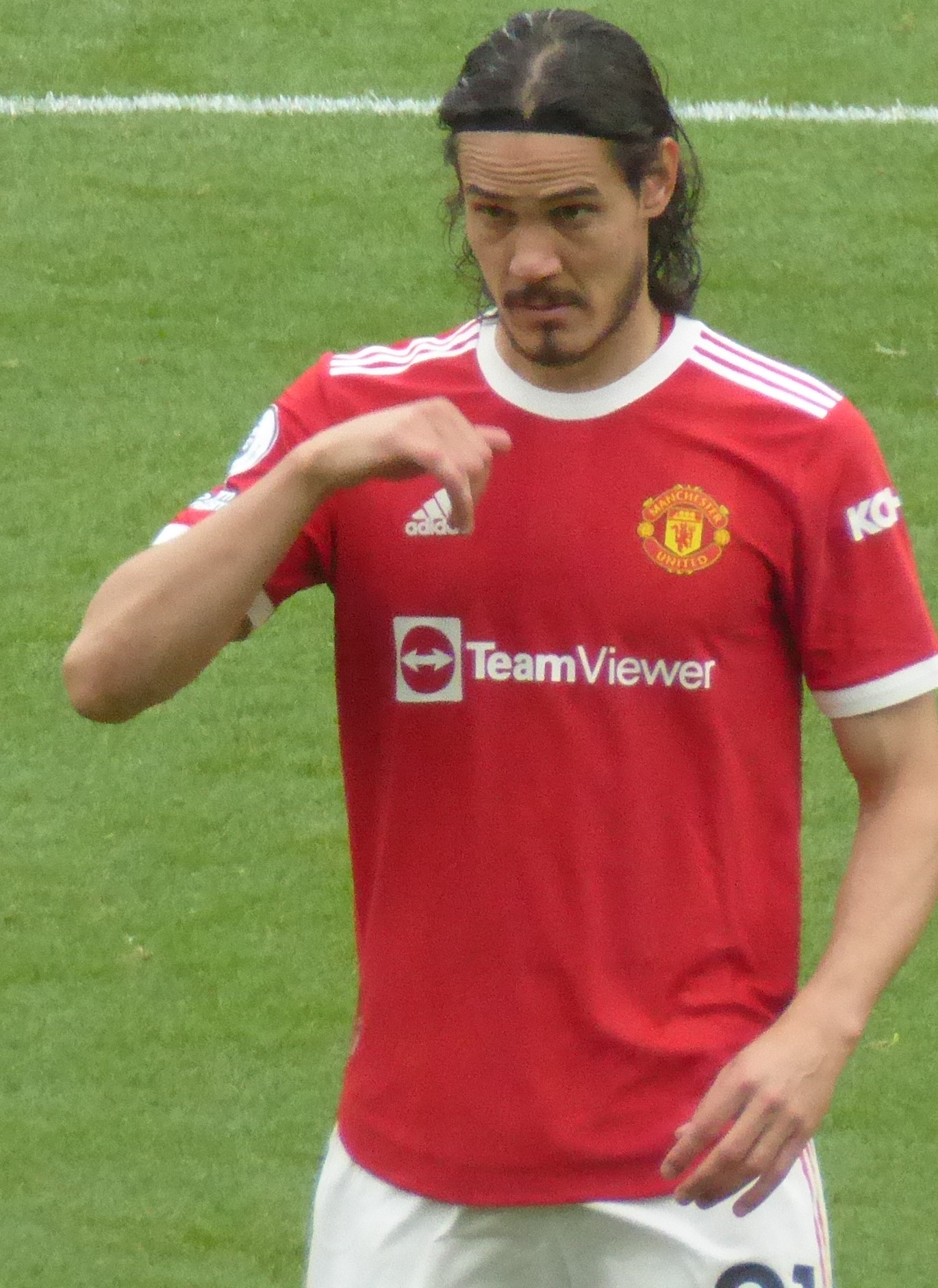
Edinson Cavani made 59 appearances for Manchester United.

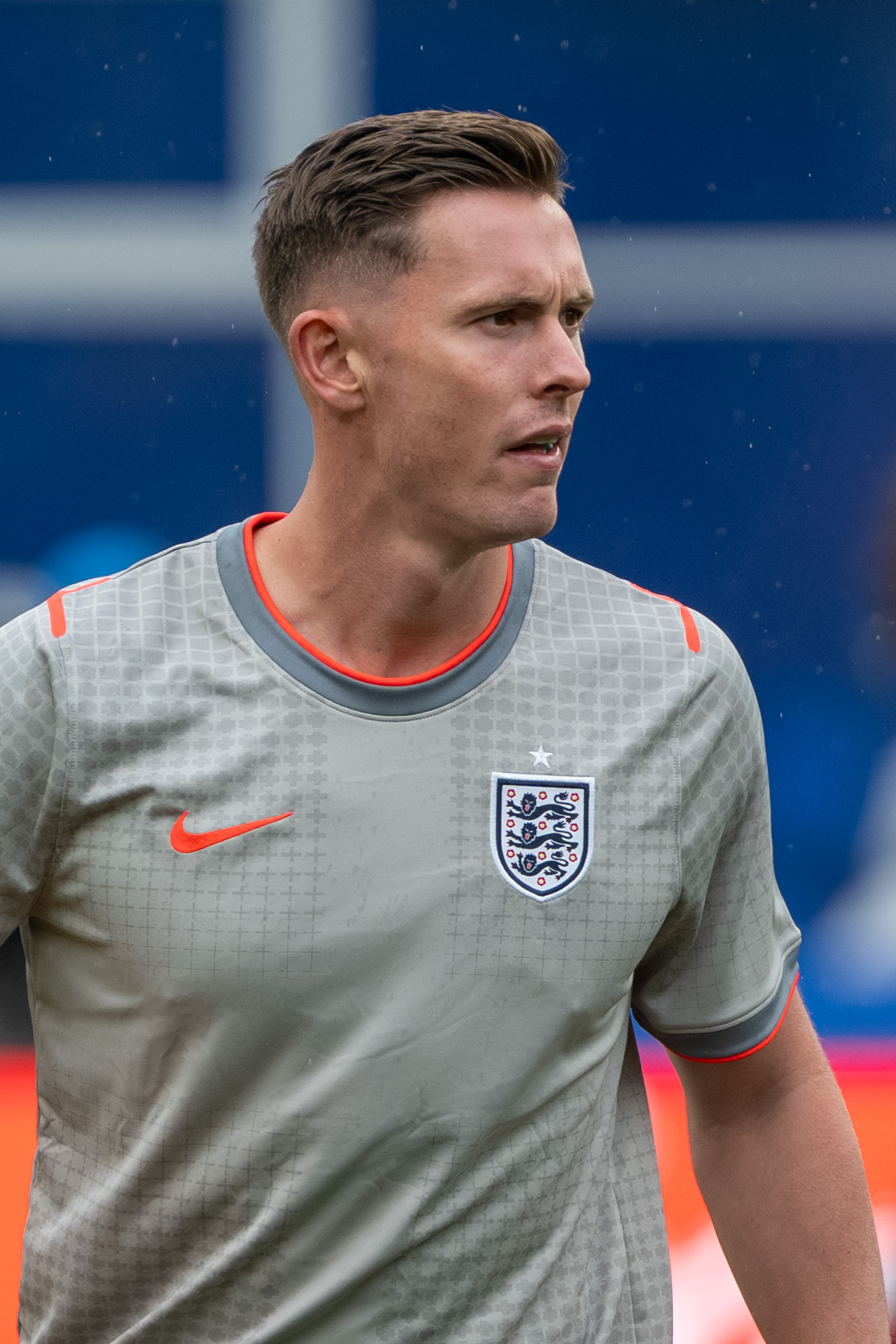
Dean Henderson made 29 appearances for Manchester United in parts of three seasons with the first team.

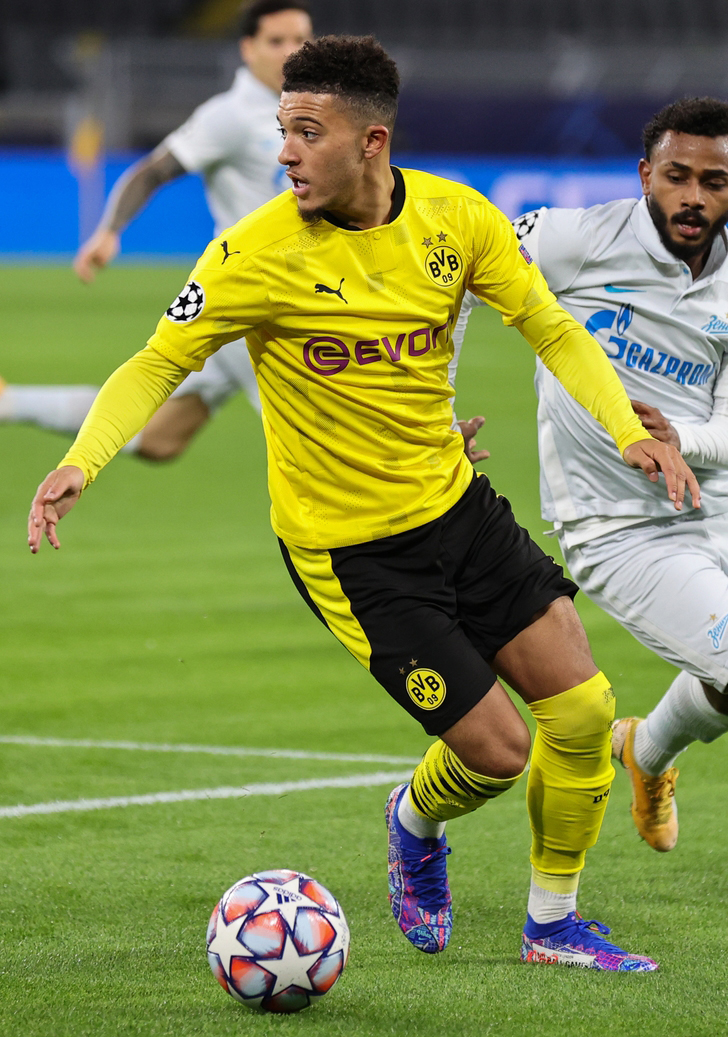
Jadon Sancho made 83 appearances for Manchester United.

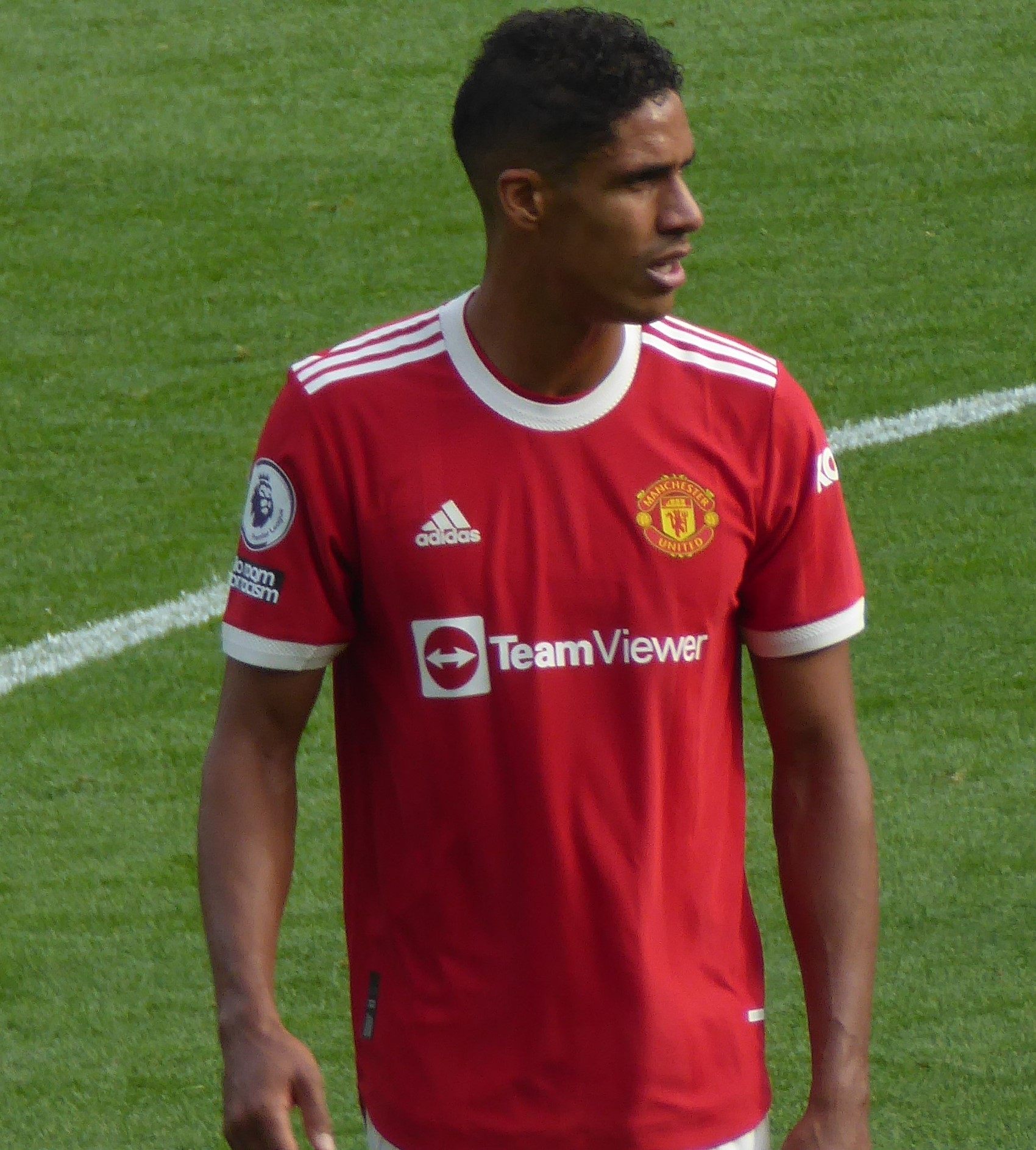
Raphaël Varane made 95 appearances for Manchester United.

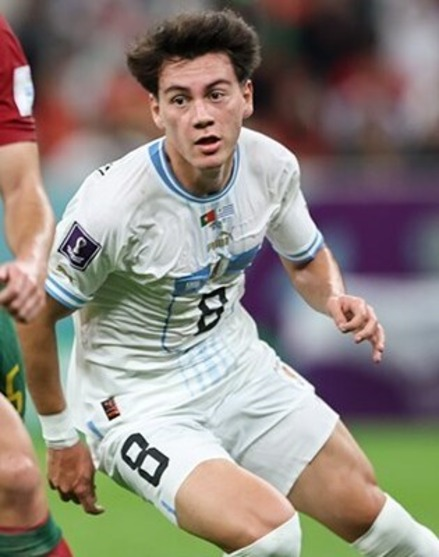
Facundo Pellistri made 25 appearances for Manchester United. Pellistri is one of five players to make exactly 25 appearances for the club.

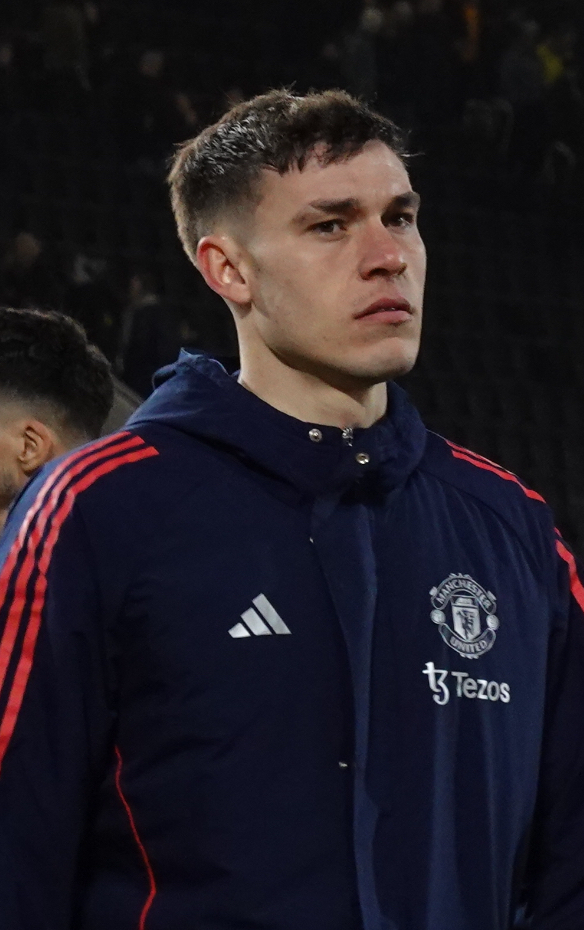
Manuel Ugarte has made over 50 appearances for Manchester United.

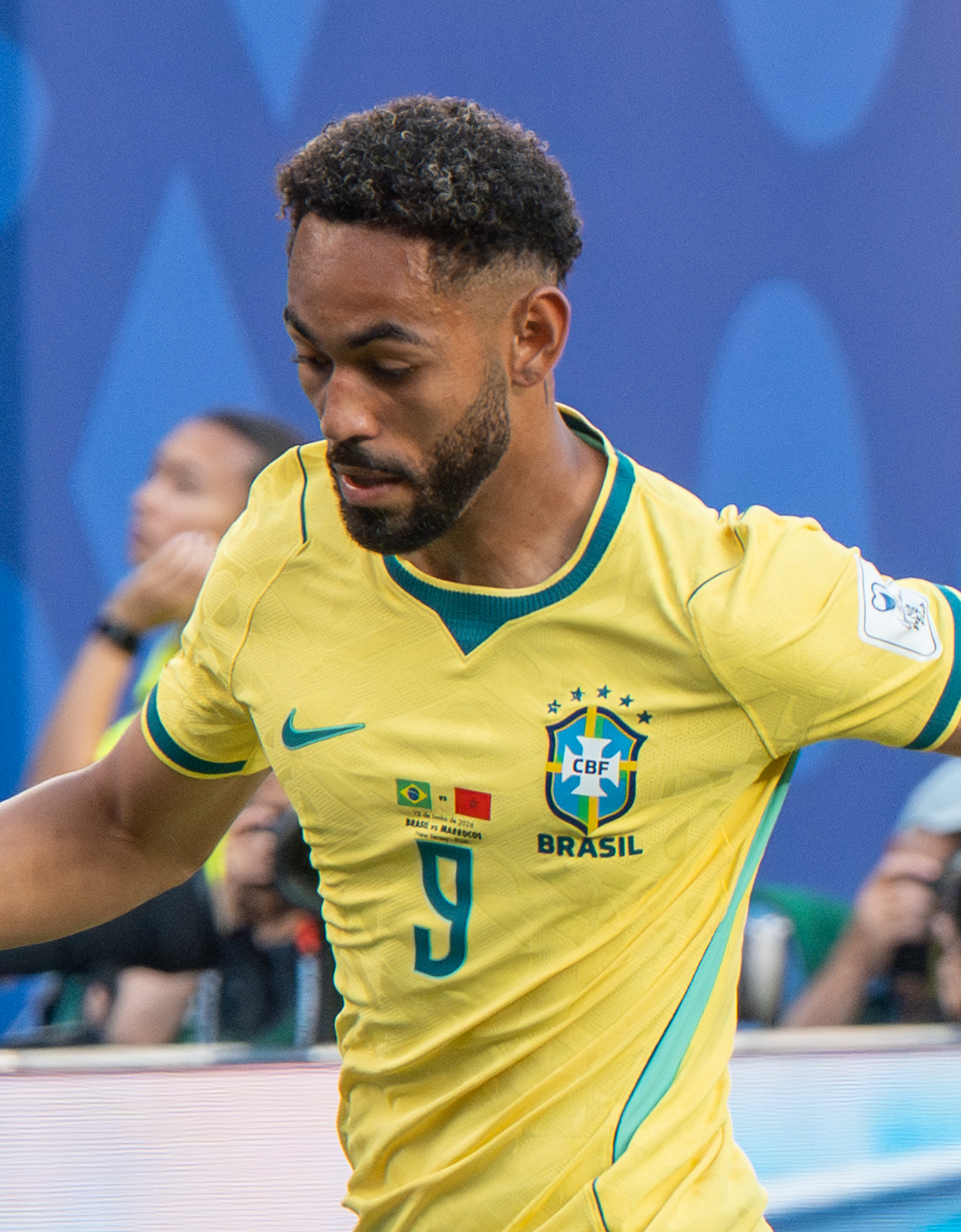
Matheus Cunha has made over 40 appearances for Manchester United.
- Appearances and goals are for first-team competitive matches only, including Premier League, Football League, FA Cup, League Cup, Charity/Community Shield, European Cup/Champions League, UEFA Cup/Europa League, Cup Winners' Cup, Inter-Cities Fairs Cup, Super Cup and Club World Cup matches; wartime matches are regarded as unofficial and are excluded, as are matches from the abandoned 1939–40 season.
- Players are listed according to the date of their first team debut for the club.
- Players in **bold** are currently under contract with Manchester United.

Statistics correct as of match played 8 November 2026

Table headers

- **Nationality** – If a player played international football, the country or countries he played for are shown. Otherwise, the player's nationality is given as his country of birth.
- **Manchester United career** – The year of the player's first appearance for Manchester United to the year of his last appearance.
- **Starts** – The number of matches started.
- **Sub** – The number of matches played as a substitute.
- **Total** – The total number of matches played, both as a starter and as a substitute.

Positions key
Pre-1960s		Post-1960s	
GK	Goalkeeper		
FB	Full-back	DF	Defender
HB	Half-back	MF	Midfielder
FW	Forward		
U	Utility player^{1}		

List of Manchester United F.C. players with between 25 and 99 appearances
Name	Nationality	Position	Manchester United career	Appearances			Goals	Ref
Name	Nationality	Position	Manchester United career	Starts	Subs	Total	Goals	Ref
Willie Stewart	Scotland	HB	1890–1895	87	0	87	5	
Jimmy Coupar	Scotland	FW	1892–1893; 1901–1902	34	0	34	10	
John Clements	England	FB	1892–1894	42	0	42	0	
Tommy Fitzsimmons	Scotland	FW	1892–1894	30	0	30	6	
Billy Hood	England	FW	1892–1894	38	0	38	6	
Andrew Mitchell	Scotland	FB	1892–1894	61	0	61	0	
Alf Farman	England	FW	1892–1895	61	0	61	28	
Will Davidson	Scotland	HB	1893–1894	44	0	44	2	
Joe Fall	England	GK	1893–1894	27	0	27	0	
Jack Peden	Ireland	FW	1893–1894	32	0	32	8	
John Clarkin	Scotland	FW	1893–1896	74	0	74	23	
William Douglas	Scotland	GK	1893–1896	57	0	57	0	
John Dow	Scotland	FB	1893–1896	50	0	50	6	
Jack Peters	England	FW	1894–1896	51	0	51	14	
William Kennedy	Scotland	FW	1895–1897	33	0	33	12	
David Fitzsimmons	Scotland	HB	1895–1900	31	0	31	0	
Jimmy Collinson	England	U	1895–1901	71	0	71	17	
Caesar Jenkyns	Wales	DF	1896–1898	47	0	47	6	
Henry Boyd	Scotland	FW	1896–1899	62	0	62	35	
Billy Draycott	England	HB	1896–1899	95	0	95	6	
Matthew Gillespie	Scotland	FW	1896–1900	89	0	89	21	
William Jackson	Wales	FW	1899–1901	64	0	64	14	
Tommy Leigh	England	FW	1899–1901	46	0	46	15	
James Fisher	Scotland	FW	1900–1902	46	0	46	3	
Harry Lappin	England	FW	1900–1903	27	0	27	4	
Jimmy Whitehouse	England	GK	1900–1903	64	0	64	0	
Jack Banks	England	HB	1901–1903	44	0	44	1	
Stephen Preston	England	FW	1901–1903	34	0	34	14	
Herbert Birchenough	England	GK	1902–1903	30	0	30	0	
Herbert Rothwell	England	FB	1902–1903	28	0	28	0	
Tommy Morrison	Ireland	FW	1902–1904	36	0	36	8	
Dick Pegg	England	FW	1902–1904	51	0	51	20	
Bert Read	England	FB	1902–1904	42	0	42	0	
Tommy Arkesden	England	FW	1902–1906	79	0	33	0	
John Willie Sutcliffe	England	GK	1903–1904	28	0	28	0	
Billy Grassam	Scotland	FW	1903–1905	37	0	37	14	
Sandy Robertson	Scotland	FW	1903–1905	34	0	34	10	
Alexander Robertson	Scotland	HB	1903–1906	35	0	35	1	
Tommy Blackstock	Scotland	FB	1903–1907	38	0	38	0	
Jack Allan	England	FW	1904–1906	36	0	36	22	
Henry Williams	England	FW	1904–1906	36	0	36	8	
Clem Beddow	England	FW	1904–1907	34	0	34	15	
Dick Wombwell	England	FW	1904–1907	51	0	51	3	
Charlie Sagar	England	FW	1905–1907	33	0	33	24	
Alex Menzies	Scotland	FW	1906–1908	25	0	25	4	
Jimmy Bannister	England	FW	1906–1910	63	0	63	8	
Herbert Burgess	England	FB	1906–1910	54	0	54	0	
Jimmy Turnbull	Scotland	FW	1907–1910	78	0	78	45	
Tony Donnelly	England	FB	1908–1913	37	0	37	0	
Oscar Linkson	England	FB	1908–1913	59	0	59	0	
George Livingstone	Scotland	U	1908–1914	46	0	46	14	
Tom Homer	England	FW	1909–1912	25	0	25	14	
Hugh Edmonds	Scotland	GK	1910–1912	51	0	51	0	
Jackie Sheldon	England	FW	1910–1913	26	0	26	0	
Jimmy Hodge	Scotland	U	1910–1920	86	0	86	2	
Mickey Hamill	Ireland	MF	1911–1914	60	0	60	2	
George Anderson	England	FW	1911–1915	86	0	86	39	
Frank Knowles	England	FB	1911–1915	47	0	47	1	
Joe Haywood	England	MF	1913–1915	26	0	26	0	
John Hodge	Scotland	DF	1913–1915	30	0	30	0	
Joe Norton	England	FW	1913–1915	37	0	37	3	
Arthur Potts	England	FW	1913–1920	29	0	29	5	
Wilf Woodcock	England	FW	1913–1920	61	0	61	21	
Patrick O'Connell	Ireland	DF	1914–1915	35	0	35	2	
James Montgomery	England	HB	1914–1921	27	0	27	1	
George Sapsford	England	FW	1919–1922	53	0	53	17	
Fred Hopkin	England	FW	1919–1921	74	0	74	8	
Tommy Meehan	England	HB	1919–1921	53	0	53	6	
Cyril Barlow	England	FB	1919–1922	30	0	30	0	
George Bissett	Scotland	FW	1919–1922	42	0	42	10	
Tommy Forster	England	MF	1919–1922	36	0	36	0	
Frank Harris	England	HB	1919–1922	49	0	49	2	
Tom Miller	Scotland	FW	1920–1921	27	0	27	8	
Billy Harrison	England	FW	1920–1922	46	0	46	5	
Joe Myerscough	England	FW	1920–1923	34	0	34	8	
Charlie Radford	England	FB	1920–1924	96	0	96	1	
Neil McBain	Scotland	HB	1921–1923	43	0	43	2	
Bill Henderson	Scotland	FW	1921–1925	36	0	36	17	
George Haslam	England	DF	1921–1928	27	0	27	0	
Ernie Goldthorpe	England	FW	1922–1925	30	0	30	16	
Tom Smith	England	FW	1923–1927	90	0	90	16	
Charlie Rennox	Scotland	FW	1924–1927	68	0	68	25	
Lance Richardson	England	GK	1924–1929	42	0	42	0	
Chris Taylor	England	FW	1924–1930	30	0	30	7	
Eric Sweeney	England	FW	1925–1930	32	0	32	7	
Billy Chapman	England	FW	1926–1928	26	0	26	0	
Rees Williams	Wales	FW	1927–1929	35	0	35	2	
Billy Johnston	Scotland	FW	1927–1929; 1930–1931	77	0	77	27	
Bill Rawlings	England	FW	1927–1930	36	0	36	19	
Charlie Spencer	England	DF	1928–1930	48	0	48	0	
Billy Dale	England	FB	1928–1932	68	0	68	0	
Jack Ball	England	FW	1929–1934; 1934–1935	50	0	50	18	
Arthur Warburton	England	FW	1929–1934	39	0	39	10	
Stanley Gallimore	England	FW	1930–1934	76	0	76	20	
Samuel Hopkinson	England	FW	1930–1934	53	0	53	12	
John Moody	England	GK	1931–1933	51	0	51	0	
Willie McDonald	Scotland	FW	1931–1934	27	0	27	4	
Bill Ridding	England	FW	1931–1934	44	0	44	14	
Ernest Vincent	England	HB	1931–1934	65	0	65	1	
Jim Brown	United States	FW	1932–1934	41	0	41	17	
Tommy Frame	Scotland	HB	1932–1936	52	0	52	4	
Stewart Chalmers	Scotland	FW	1932–1934	35	0	35	1	
Neil Dewar	Scotland	FW	1932–1934	36	0	36	14	
William Stewart	Scotland	FW	1932–1934	49	0	49	7	
Ernie Hine	England	FW	1932–1935	53	0	53	12	
Jack Hacking	England	GK	1933–1935	34	0	34	0	
Walter McMillen	Ireland	HB	1933–1935	29	0	29	2	
Jack Hall	England	GK	1933–1936	73	0	73	0	
William Robertson	Scotland	MF	1933–1936	50	0	50	1	
Jack Cape	England	FW	1933–1937	60	0	60	18	
Billy Porter	England	FB	1934–1938	65	0	65	0	
Jack Breedon	England	GK	1935–1940	35	0	35	0	
Hubert Redwood	England	FB	1935–1940	96	0	96	4	
Jackie Wassall	England	FW	1935–1940	48	0	48	6	
Bert Whalley	England	MF	1935–1947	39	0	39	0	
George Gladwin	England	MF	1936–1937	28	0	28	1	
Harry Baird	Ireland	FW	1936–1938	53	0	53	18	
Walter Winterbottom	England	HB	1936–1938	27	0	27	0	
Tommy Breen	Ireland; Republic of Ireland	GK	1936–1939	71	0	71	0	
George Roughton	England	FB	1936–1939	92	0	92	0	
Billy Wrigglesworth	England	FW	1936–1947	37	0	37	10	
Jack Smith	England	FW	1937–1946	42	0	42	15	
Jimmy Hanlon	England	FW	1938–1949	69	0	69	22	
Ronnie Burke	England	FW	1946–1949	35	0	35	23	
Johnny Morris	England	FW	1946–1949	93	0	93	35	
John Anderson	England	MF	1946–1949	40	0	40	2	
Tommy Bogan	Scotland	U	1949–1951	33	0	33	7	
Thomas McNulty	England	DF	1949–1954	59	0	59	0	
Jeff Whitefoot	England	MF	1950–1957	95	0	95	0	
Reg Allen	England	GK	1950–1953	80	0	80	0	
Harry McShane	Scotland	FW	1950–1954	57	0	57	8	
Billy Redman	England	FW	1950–1954	38	0	38	0	
John Doherty	England	FW	1952–1957	26	0	26	7	
Billy Whelan	Republic of Ireland	FW	1952–1958	98	0	98	52	
Colin Webster	Wales	FW	1953–1959	79	0	79	31	
Ian Greaves	England	FB	1954–1960	75	0	75	0	
Wilf McGuinness	England	MF	1955–1960	85	0	85	2	
Alex Dawson	Scotland	FW	1956–1962	93	0	93	54	
Ernie Taylor	England	FW	1957–1959	30	0	30	4	
Mark Pearson	England	FW	1957–1962	80	0	80	14	
Joe Carolan	Republic of Ireland	FB	1958–1961	71	0	71	0	
Warren Bradley	England	FW	1958–1962	67	0	67	21	
Nobby Lawton	England	MF	1959–1962	44	0	44	6	
Jimmy Nicholson	Northern Ireland	MF	1960–1962	68	0	68	6	
Ian Moir	Scotland	FW	1960–1965	45	0	45	5	
Phil Chisnall	England	FW	1961–1964	47	0	47	10	
Pat Dunne	Republic of Ireland	GK	1964–1966	67	0	67	0	
Bobby Noble	England	FB	1965–1967	33	0	33	0	
Jimmy Ryan	Scotland	FW	1965–1970	24	3	27	4	
Alan Gowling	England	FW	1967–1972	77	10	87	21	
Jimmy Rimmer	England	GK	1967–1973	45	1	46	0	
Carlo Sartori	Italy	MF	1968–1972	40	16	56	6	
Ian Ure	Scotland	DF	1969–1971	65	0	65	1	
Paul Edwards	England	DF	1969–1972	66	2	68	1	
Tommy O'Neil	England	DF	1970–1972	68	0	68	0	
Tony Young	England	FB	1970–1975	79	18	97	1	
Ian Storey-Moore	England	FW	1971–1974	43	0	43	12	
George Graham	Scotland	U	1972–1975	44	2	46	2	
Jim Holton	Scotland	DF	1972–1975	69	0	69	5	
Mick Martin	Republic of Ireland	MF	1972–1975	36	7	43	2	
Jim McCalliog	Scotland	MF	1973–1974	37	1	38	7	
Paddy Roche	Republic of Ireland	GK	1974–1982	53	0	53	0	
Chris McGrath	Northern Ireland	FW	1976–1981	15	19	34	1	
Andy Ritchie	England	FW	1977–1981	32	10	42	13	
Garry Birtles	England	FW	1980–1982	63	1	64	12	
Nikola Jovanović	Yugoslavia	DF	1980–1982	25	1	26	4	
Scott McGarvey	Scotland	FW	1980–1983	13	12	25	3	
Arnold Mühren	Netherlands	MF	1982–1985	93	5	98	18	
Arthur Graham	Scotland	FW	1983–1985	47	5	52	7	
Alan Brazil	Scotland	FW	1984–1986	24	17	41	12	
Billy Garton	England	DF	1984–1989	47	4	51	0	
Peter Barnes	England	FW	1985–1987	24	1	25	5	
Terry Gibson	England	FW	1985–1987	15	12	27	1	
John Sivebæk	Denmark	U	1985–1987	32	2	34	1	
Chris Turner	England	GK	1985–1988	79	0	79	0	
Colin Gibson	England	U	1985–1990	89	6	95	9	
Liam O'Brien	Republic of Ireland	MF	1986–1988	17	19	36	2	
Gary Walsh	England	GK	1986–1995	62	1	63	0	
Viv Anderson	England	DF	1987–1991	64	5	69	4	
Jim Leighton	Scotland	GK	1988–1990	94	0	94	0	
Ralph Milne	Scotland	FW	1988–1990	26	4	30	3	
Russell Beardsmore	England	U	1988–1992	39	34	73	4	
Mark Robins	England	FW	1988–1992	27	43	70	17	
Danny Wallace	England	FW	1989–1993	53	18	71	11	
Les Sealey	England	GK	1990–1991; 1994	55	1	56	0	
Mark Bosnich	Australia	GK	1990–1991; 1999–2000	38	0	38	0	
Darren Ferguson	Scotland	MF	1991–1994	22	8	30	0	
Karel Poborský	Czech Republic	FW	1996–1997	28	20	48	6	
Jordi Cruyff	Netherlands	FW	1996–2000	26	32	58	8	
Raimond van der Gouw	Netherlands	GK	1996–2001	48	12	60	0	
Ronnie Wallwork	England	MF	1997–2002	10	18	28	0	
Jesper Blomqvist	Sweden	FW	1998–1999	29	9	38	1	
Jonathan Greening	England	MF	1998–2001	13	14	27	0	
Luke Chadwick	England	FW	1999–2003	18	21	39	2	
Laurent Blanc	France	DF	2001–2003	71	4	75	4	
Juan Sebastián Verón	Argentina	MF	2001–2003	75	7	82	11	
Roy Carroll	Northern Ireland	GK	2001–2005	68	4	72	0	
Diego Forlán	Uruguay	FW	2001–2005	37	61	98	17	
Kieran Richardson	England	FW	2002–2007	44	37	81	11	
Kléberson	Brazil	MF	2003–2004	24	6	30	2	
David Bellion	France	FW	2003–2005	15	25	40	8	
Eric Djemba-Djemba	Cameroon	MF	2003–2005	27	12	39	2	
Tim Howard	United States	GK	2003–2006	76	1	77	0	
Gabriel Heinze	Argentina	DF	2004–2007	75	8	83	4	
Alan Smith	England	FW	2004–2007	61	32	93	12	
Darron Gibson	Republic of Ireland	MF	2005–2011	37	23	60	10	
Tomasz Kuszczak	Poland	GK	2006–2011	56	5	61	0	
Owen Hargreaves	England	MF	2007–2010	26	13	39	2	
Carlos Tevez	Argentina	FW	2007–2009	73	26	99	34	
Fábio	Brazil	DF	2009–2014	37	19	56	3	
Federico Macheda	Italy	FW	2009–2014	15	21	36	5	
Michael Owen	England	FW	2009–2011	18	34	52	17	
Gabriel Obertan	France	FW	2009–2011	13	15	28	1	
Anders Lindegaard	Denmark	GK	2011–2015	29	0	29	0	
Tom Cleverley	England	MF	2011–2015	63	16	79	5	
Shinji Kagawa	Japan	MF	2012–2014	46	11	57	6	
Alexander Büttner	Netherlands	DF	2012–2014	23	5	28	2	
Adnan Januzaj	Belgium	MF	2013–2016	31	32	63	5	
Ángel Di María	Argentina	MF	2014–2015	24	8	32	4	
Radamel Falcao	Colombia	FW	2014–2015	17	12	29	4	
Paddy McNair	Northern Ireland	DF	2014–2016	18	9	27	0	
Andreas Pereira	Brazil	MF	2014–2020	36	39	75	4	
Bastian Schweinsteiger	Germany	MF	2015–2017	22	13	35	2	
Memphis Depay	Netherlands	FW	2015–2017	28	25	53	7	
Matteo Darmian	Italy	DF	2015–2019	76	16	92	1	
Morgan Schneiderlin	France	MF	2015–2017	36	11	47	1	
Sergio Romero	Argentina	GK	2015–2020	61	0	61	0	
Zlatan Ibrahimović	Sweden	FW	2016–2017; 2017^{2}	43	10	53	29	
Henrikh Mkhitaryan	Armenia	MF	2016–2018	46	17	63	13	
Timothy Fosu-Mensah	Netherlands	DF	2016–2020	12	18	30	0	
Romelu Lukaku	Belgium	FW	2017–2019	77	19	96	42	
Axel Tuanzebe	DR Congo	DF	2017–2021	21	16	37	0	
Alexis Sánchez	Chile	FW	2018–2019	31	14	45	5	
Daniel James	Wales	MF	2019–2021	55	19	74	9	
Brandon Williams	England	DF	2019–2022	30	21	51	1	
Donny van de Beek	Netherlands	MF	2020–2023	23	39	62	2	
Edinson Cavani	Uruguay	FW	2020–2022	29	30	59	19	
Dean Henderson	England	GK	2020–2022	28	1	29	0	
Alex Telles	Brazil	DF	2020–2022	44	6	50	1	
Anthony Elanga	Sweden	FW	2021–2023	24	31	55	4	
Jadon Sancho	England	FW	2021–2024	57	26	83	12	
Raphaël Varane	France	DF	2021–2024	82	13	95	2	
Tyrell Malacia	Netherlands	DF	2022–2026	34	16	50	0	
Antony	Brazil	FW	2022–2025	63	33	96	12	
Wout Weghorst	Netherlands	FW	2023	22	9	31	2	
Rasmus Højlund	Denmark	FW	2023–2025	73	22	95	26	
Sofyan Amrabat	Morocco	MF	2023–2024	16	14	30	0	
Facundo Pellistri	Uruguay	MF	2023–2024	4	21	25	0	
**Mason Mount**	England	MF	2023–	35	46	81	8	
**Noussair Mazraoui**	Morocco	DF	2024–	68	17	85	0	
**Joshua Zirkzee**	Netherlands	FW	2024–	27	57	84	11	
**Matthijs de Ligt**	Netherlands	DF	2024–	50	8	58	3	
**Manuel Ugarte**	Uruguay	MF	2024–	46	23	69	2	
**Leny Yoro**	France	DF	2024–	51	27	78	1	
**Patrick Dorgu**	Denmark	DF	2025–	39	15	54	5	
**Ayden Heaven**	England	DF	2025–	20	11	31	0	
**Matheus Cunha**	Brazil	FW	2025–	42	7	49	14	
**Bryan Mbeumo**	Cameroon	FW	2025–	44	4	48	16	
**Benjamin Šeško**	Slovenia	FW	2025–	21	17	37	14	
**Senne Lammens**	Belgium	GK	2025–	46	0	46	0	

== Notes ==
- A utility player is one who is considered to play in more than one position.
- Zlatan Ibrahimović's first contract with Manchester United expired in June 2017. After suffering an injury, he rejoined the club in August 2017 and made seven more appearances for the club in November and December 2017 before departing in March 2018.
