= 1932–33 Manchester United F.C. season =

English football club season

Manchester United
1932–33 season
- Chairman: James W. Gibson
- Manager: Scott Duncan
- Second Division: 6th
- FA Cup: Third Round
- Top goalscorer: League: Bill Ridding (11); All: Bill Ridding (11)
- Highest home attendance: 65,988 vs Swansea Town (6 May 1933)
- Lowest home attendance: 9,480 vs Charlton Athletic (7 September 1932)
- Average home league attendance: 23,478
Home colours	Away colours

The 1932–33 season was Manchester United's 37th season in the Football League. They improved on the previous season's 12th-place finish, but sixth in the final table was not enough for promotion from the Second Division.

== Second Division ==
Date	Opponents	H / A	Result F–A	Scorers	Attendance
27 August 1932	Stoke City	H	0–2		24,996
29 August 1932	Charlton Athletic	A	1–0	Spence	12,946
3 September 1932	Southampton	A	2–4	Reid, own goal	7,978
7 September 1932	Charlton Athletic	H	1–1	McLenahan	9,480
10 September 1932	Tottenham Hotspur	A	1–6	Ridding	23,333
17 September 1932	Grimsby Town	H	1–1	Brown	17,662
24 September 1932	Oldham Athletic	A	1–1	Spence	14,403
1 October 1932	Preston North End	H	0–0		20,800
8 October 1932	Burnley	A	3–2	Brown, Gallimore, Spence	5,314
15 October 1932	Bradford Park Avenue	H	2–1	Reid (2)	18,918
22 October 1932	Millwall	H	7–1	Reid (3), Brown (2), Gallimore, Spence	15,860
29 October 1932	Port Vale	A	3–3	Ridding (2), Brown	7,138
5 November 1932	Notts County	H	2–0	Gallimore, Ridding	24,178
12 November 1932	Bury	A	2–2	Brown, Ridding	21,663
19 November 1932	Fulham	H	4–3	Gallimore (2), Brown, Ridding	28,803
26 November 1932	Chesterfield	A	1–1	Ridding	10,277
3 December 1932	Bradford City	H	0–1		28,513
10 December 1932	West Ham United	A	1–3	Ridding	13,435
17 December 1932	Lincoln City	H	4–1	Reid (3), own goal	18,021
24 December 1932	Swansea Town	A	1–2	Brown	10,727
26 December 1932	Plymouth Argyle	A	3–2	Spence (2), Reid	33,776
31 December 1932	Stoke City	A	0–0		14,115
2 January 1933	Plymouth Argyle	H	4–0	Ridding (2), Chalmers, Spence	30,257
7 January 1933	Southampton	H	1–2	McDonald	21,364
21 January 1933	Tottenham Hotspur	H	2–1	Frame, McDonald	20,661
31 January 1933	Grimsby Town	A	1–1	Stewart	4,020
4 February 1933	Oldham Athletic	H	2–0	Ridding, Stewart	15,275
11 February 1933	Preston North End	A	3–3	Dewar, Hopkinson, Stewart	15,662
22 February 1933	Burnley	H	2–1	McDonald, Warburton	18,533
4 March 1933	Millwall	A	0–2		22,587
11 March 1933	Port Vale	H	1–1	Hine	24,690
18 March 1933	Notts County	A	0–1		13,018
25 March 1933	Bury	H	1–3	McLenahan	27,687
1 April 1933	Fulham	A	1–3	Dewar	21,477
5 April 1933	Bradford Park Avenue	A	1–1	Vincent	6,314
8 April 1933	Chesterfield	H	2–1	Dewar, Frame	16,031
14 April 1933	Nottingham Forest	A	2–3	Brown, Dewar	12,963
15 April 1933	Bradford City	A	2–1	Brown, Hine	11,195
17 April 1933	Nottingham Forest	H	2–1	Hine, McDonald	16,849
22 April 1933	West Ham United	H	1–2	Dewar	14,958
29 April 1933	Lincoln City	A	2–3	Dewar, Hine	8,507
6 May 1933	Swansea Town	H	1–1	Hine	65,988

Pos	Team	Pld	W	D	L	GF	GA	GAv	Pts
4	Bury	42	20	9	13	84	59	1.424	49
5	Nottingham Forest	42	17	15	10	67	59	1.136	49
6	Manchester United	42	15	13	14	71	68	1.044	43
7	Millwall	42	16	11	15	59	57	1.035	43
8	Bradford (Park Avenue)	42	17	8	17	77	71	1.085	42

Rules for classification: 1) Points; 2) Goal average; 3) Goals scored

== FA Cup ==
Date	Round	Opponents	H / A	Result F–A	Scorers	Attendance
14 January 1933	Round 3	Middlesbrough	H	1–4	Spence	36,991

== Squad statistics ==
Pos.	Name	League		FA Cup		Total	
Pos.	Name	Apps	Goals	Apps	Goals	Apps	Goals
GK	(England) John Moody	42	0	1	0	43	0
FB	(Scotland) Tommy Frame	33	2	1	0	34	2
FB	(Wales) Tom Jones	10	0	0	0	10	0
FB	(England) Jack Mellor	40	0	1	0	41	0
FB	(England) Jack Silcock	27	0	1	0	28	0
FB	(England) Henry Topping	5	0	0	0	5	0
HB	(Scotland) George McLachlan	17	0	0	0	17	0
HB	(England) Hugh McLenahan	24	2	1	0	25	2
HB	(England) Tom Manley	19	0	0	0	19	0
HB	(England) Ernest Vincent	40	1	1	0	41	1
FW	(Scotland) Dick Black	1	0	0	0	1	0
FW	(Scotland) (United States) Jim Brown	25	10	0	0	25	10
FW	(Scotland) Stewart Chalmers	22	1	1	0	23	1
FW	(Scotland) Neil Dewar	15	6	0	0	15	6
FW	(England) Arthur Fitton	4	0	0	0	4	0
FW	(England) Stanley Gallimore	12	5	0	0	12	5
FW	(England) Herbert Heywood	1	0	0	0	1	0
FW	(England) Ernie Hine	14	5	0	0	14	5
FW	(England) Samuel Hopkinson	6	1	0	0	6	1
FW	(Scotland) Willie McDonald	21	4	0	0	21	4
FW	(England) Andy Mitchell	1	0	0	0	1	0
FW	(England) Louis Page	3	0	0	0	3	0
FW	(Scotland) Tommy Reid	11	10	1	0	12	10
FW	(England) Bill Ridding	23	11	1	0	24	11
FW	(England) Joe Spence	19	7	1	1	20	8
FW	(Scotland) William Stewart	21	3	1	0	22	3
FW	(England) Arthur Warburton	6	1	0	0	6	1
—	Own goals	—	2	—	0	—	2
