= 1933–34 Manchester United F.C. season =

English football club season

Manchester United
1933–34 season
- Chairman: James W. Gibson
- Manager: Scott Duncan
- Second Division: 20th
- FA Cup: Third Round
- Top goalscorer: League: Neil Dewar (8); All: Neil Dewar (8)
- Highest home attendance: 29,443 vs Grimsby Town (25 December 1933)
- Lowest home attendance: 11,176 vs Bury (3 March 1934)
- Average home league attendance: 18,563
| Home colours | Away colours |

The 1933–34 season was Manchester United's 38th season in the Football League.

5 May 1934 was one of the most important dates in the history of Manchester United. Going into the last game of the season the team were in 21st place in the Second Division, one point away from safety. However, their future was in their own hands, as in the last game of the season they played Millwall, the team just above them and keeping them in the relegation zone.

After taking the lead through Tom Manley, United's Jack Cape then put the game beyond doubt when he added a second. This result meant Millwall were relegated to the Third Division instead of Manchester United.

== Second Division ==
| Date | Opponents | H / A | Result F–A | Scorers | Attendance |
|---|---|---|---|---|---|
| 26 August 1933 | Plymouth Argyle | A | 0–4 | | 25,700 |
| 30 August 1933 | Nottingham Forest | H | 0–1 | | 16,934 |
| 2 September 1933 | Lincoln City | H | 1–1 | Green | 16,987 |
| 7 September 1933 | Nottingham Forest | A | 1–1 | Stewart | 10,650 |
| 9 September 1933 | Bolton Wanderers | H | 1–5 | Stewart | 21,779 |
| 16 September 1933 | Brentford | A | 4–3 | Brown (2), Frame, Hine | 17,180 |
| 23 September 1933 | Burnley | H | 5–2 | Dewar (4), Brown | 18,411 |
| 30 September 1933 | Oldham Athletic | A | 0–2 | | 22,736 |
| 7 October 1933 | Preston North End | H | 1–0 | Hine | 22,303 |
| 14 October 1933 | Bradford Park Avenue | A | 1–6 | Hine | 11,033 |
| 21 October 1933 | Bury | A | 1–2 | Byrne | 15,008 |
| 28 October 1933 | Hull City | H | 4–1 | Heywood (2), Green, Hine | 16,269 |
| 4 November 1933 | Fulham | A | 2–0 | Stewart, own goal | 17,049 |
| 11 November 1933 | Southampton | H | 1–0 | Manley | 18,149 |
| 18 November 1933 | Blackpool | A | 1–3 | Brown | 14,384 |
| 25 November 1933 | Bradford City | H | 2–1 | Dewar, own goal | 20,902 |
| 2 December 1933 | Port Vale | A | 3–2 | Black, Brown, Dewar | 10,316 |
| 9 December 1933 | Notts County | H | 1–2 | Dewar | 15,564 |
| 16 December 1933 | Swansea Town | A | 1–2 | Hine | 6,591 |
| 23 December 1933 | Millwall | H | 1–1 | Dewar | 12,043 |
| 25 December 1933 | Grimsby Town | H | 1–3 | Vose | 29,443 |
| 26 December 1933 | Grimsby Town | A | 3–7 | Byrne (2), Frame | 15,801 |
| 30 December 1933 | Plymouth Argyle | H | 0–3 | | 12,206 |
| 6 January 1934 | Lincoln City | A | 1–5 | Brown | 6,075 |
| 20 January 1934 | Bolton Wanderers | A | 1–3 | Ball | 11,887 |
| 27 January 1934 | Brentford | H | 1–3 | Ball | 16,891 |
| 3 February 1934 | Burnley | A | 4–1 | Cape (2), Green, Stewart | 9,906 |
| 10 February 1934 | Oldham Athletic | H | 2–3 | Cape, Green | 24,480 |
| 21 February 1934 | Preston North End | A | 2–3 | Gallimore (2) | 9,173 |
| 24 February 1934 | Bradford Park Avenue | H | 0–4 | | 13,389 |
| 3 March 1934 | Bury | H | 2–1 | Ball, Gallimore | 11,176 |
| 10 March 1934 | Hull City | A | 1–4 | Ball | 5,771 |
| 17 March 1934 | Fulham | H | 1–0 | Ball | 17,565 |
| 24 March 1934 | Southampton | A | 0–1 | | 4,840 |
| 30 March 1934 | West Ham United | H | 0–1 | | 29,114 |
| 31 March 1934 | Blackpool | H | 2–0 | Cape, Hine | 20,038 |
| 2 April 1934 | West Ham United | A | 1–2 | Cape | 20,085 |
| 7 April 1934 | Bradford City | A | 1–1 | Cape | 9,258 |
| 14 April 1934 | Port Vale | H | 2–0 | Brown, McMillen | 14,777 |
| 21 April 1934 | Notts County | A | 0–0 | | 9,645 |
| 28 April 1934 | Swansea Town | H | 1–1 | Topping | 16,678 |
| 5 May 1934 | Millwall | A | 2–0 | Cape, Manley | 24,003 |

| Pos | Team | Pld | W | D | L | GF | GA | GAv | Pts | Promotion or relegation |
|---|---|---|---|---|---|---|---|---|---|---|
| 18 | Notts County | 42 | 12 | 11 | 19 | 53 | 62 | 0.855 | 35 | |
| 19 | Swansea Town | 42 | 10 | 15 | 17 | 51 | 60 | 0.850 | 35 | |
| 20 | Manchester United | 42 | 14 | 6 | 22 | 59 | 85 | 0.694 | 34 | |
| 21 | Millwall (R) | 42 | 11 | 11 | 20 | 39 | 68 | 0.574 | 33 | Relegation to the Third Division South |
| 22 | Lincoln City (R) | 42 | 9 | 8 | 25 | 44 | 75 | 0.587 | 26 | Relegation to the Third Division North |

Rules for classification: 1) Points; 2) Goal average; 3) Goals scored
(R) Relegated

== FA Cup ==
| Date | Round | Opponents | H / A | Result F–A | Scorers | Attendance |
|---|---|---|---|---|---|---|
| 13 January 1934 | Round 3 | Portsmouth | H | 1–1 | McLenahan | 23,282 |
| 17 January 1934 | Round 3 Replay | Portsmouth | A | 1–4 | Ball | 18,748 |

== Squad statistics ==
| Pos. | Name | League | | FA Cup | | Total | |
| Pos. | Name | Apps | Goals | Apps | Goals | Apps | Goals |
|---|---|---|---|---|---|---|---|
| GK | (Republic of Ireland) Billy Behan | 1 | 0 | 0 | 0 | 1 | 0 |
| GK | (England) Jack Hacking | 10 | 0 | 0 | 0 | 10 | 0 |
| GK | (England) Jack Hall | 23 | 0 | 2 | 0 | 25 | 0 |
| GK | (England) Charlie Hillam | 8 | 0 | 0 | 0 | 8 | 0 |
| FB | (Scotland) Tommy Frame | 18 | 2 | 0 | 0 | 18 | 2 |
| FB | (England) Jack Griffiths | 10 | 0 | 0 | 0 | 10 | 0 |
| FB | (Wales) Tom Jones | 39 | 0 | 2 | 0 | 41 | 0 |
| FB | (England) Tom Manns | 2 | 0 | 0 | 0 | 2 | 0 |
| FB | (Ireland) Walter McMillen | 23 | 1 | 2 | 0 | 25 | 1 |
| FB | (England) Jack Mellor | 5 | 0 | 0 | 0 | 5 | 0 |
| FB | (England) George Nevin | 4 | 0 | 1 | 0 | 5 | 0 |
| FB | (England) Jack Silcock | 16 | 0 | 1 | 0 | 17 | 0 |
| FB | (England) Henry Topping | 6 | 1 | 0 | 0 | 6 | 1 |
| HB | (England) Tom Manley | 30 | 2 | 2 | 0 | 32 | 2 |
| HB | (Scotland) Bill McKay | 10 | 0 | 0 | 0 | 10 | 0 |
| HB | (England) Hugh McLenahan | 22 | 0 | 2 | 1 | 24 | 1 |
| HB | (England) Percy Newton | 2 | 0 | 0 | 0 | 2 | 0 |
| HB | (Scotland) William Robertson | 10 | 0 | 0 | 0 | 10 | 0 |
| HB | (England) Ernest Vincent | 8 | 0 | 0 | 0 | 8 | 0 |
| HB | (England) George Vose | 17 | 1 | 2 | 0 | 19 | 1 |
| FW | (England) Alf Ainsworth | 2 | 0 | 0 | 0 | 2 | 0 |
| FW | (England) Jack Ball | 18 | 5 | 2 | 1 | 20 | 6 |
| FW | (Scotland) Dick Black | 4 | 1 | 0 | 0 | 4 | 1 |
| FW | (United States) Jim Brown | 15 | 7 | 1 | 0 | 16 | 7 |
| FW | (Republic of Ireland) David Byrne | 4 | 3 | 0 | 0 | 4 | 3 |
| FW | (England) Jack Cape | 17 | 7 | 0 | 0 | 17 | 7 |
| FW | (Scotland) Stewart Chalmers | 12 | 0 | 0 | 0 | 12 | 0 |
| FW | (Scotland) Neil Dewar | 21 | 8 | 0 | 0 | 21 | 8 |
| FW | (England) Stanley Gallimore | 7 | 3 | 0 | 0 | 7 | 3 |
| FW | (England) Eddie Green | 9 | 4 | 0 | 0 | 9 | 4 |
| FW | (England) Herbert Heywood | 3 | 2 | 0 | 0 | 3 | 2 |
| FW | (England) Ernie Hine | 33 | 6 | 2 | 0 | 35 | 6 |
| FW | (England) Samuel Hopkinson | 9 | 0 | 0 | 0 | 9 | 0 |
| FW | (Scotland) Willie McDonald | 4 | 0 | 0 | 0 | 4 | 0 |
| FW | (Scotland) Charlie McGillivray | 8 | 0 | 1 | 0 | 9 | 0 |
| FW | (England) Bill Ridding | 5 | 0 | 0 | 0 | 5 | 0 |
| FW | (Scotland) William Stewart | 25 | 4 | 2 | 0 | 27 | 4 |
| FW | (England) Arthur Warburton | 2 | 0 | 0 | 0 | 2 | 0 |
| — | Own goals | — | 2 | — | 0 | — | 2 |
