= 1930–31 Manchester United F.C. season =

English football club season

Manchester United
1930–31 season
- Chairman: George Lawton
- Manager: Herbert Bamlett (until March 30); Walter Crickmer (from March 30)
- First Division: 22nd (relegated)
- FA Cup: Fourth Round
- Top goalscorer: League: Reid (17); All: Reid (20)
- Highest home attendance: 39,876 vs Manchester City (7 February 1931)
- Lowest home attendance: 3,969 vs Middlesbrough (2 May 1931)
- Average home league attendance: 12,155
Home colours	Away colours

The 1930–31 season was Manchester United's 35th season in the Football League.

At the end of the season, United finished last in the league and were relegated to the Second Division, having won just seven games all season and lost all of their opening 12 fixtures. Herbert Bamlett was sacked as manager with six games remaining and relegation looking virtually certain, with club secretary Walter Crickmer stepping in as acting manager for the rest of the season (though Crickmer would, in the event, stay in charge until the summer of 1932). The last game of the season, a 4–4 home draw with Middlesbrough, was watched by fewer than 4,000 spectators, as the Great Depression further affected attendances.

== First Division ==
Date	Opponents	H / A	Result F–A	Scorers	Attendance
30 August 1930	Aston Villa	H	3–4	Reid, Rowley, Warburton	18,004
3 September 1930	Middlesbrough	A	1–3	Rowley	15,712
6 September 1930	Chelsea	A	2–6	Reid, Spence	68,648
10 September 1930	Huddersfield Town	H	0–6		11,836
13 September 1930	Newcastle United	H	4–7	Reid (3), Rowley	10,907
15 September 1930	Huddersfield Town	A	0–3		14,028
20 September 1930	Sheffield Wednesday	A	0–3		18,705
27 September 1930	Grimsby Town	H	0–2		14,695
4 October 1930	Manchester City	A	1–4	Spence	41,757
11 October 1930	West Ham United	A	1–5	Reid	20,003
18 October 1930	Arsenal	H	1–2	McLachlan	23,406
25 October 1930	Portsmouth	A	1–4	Rowley	19,262
1 November 1930	Birmingham	H	2–0	Gallimore, Rowley	11,479
8 November 1930	Leicester City	A	4–5	Bullock (3), McLachlan	17,466
15 November 1930	Blackpool	H	0–0		14,765
22 November 1930	Sheffield United	A	1–3	Gallimore	12,698
29 November 1930	Sunderland	H	1–1	Gallimore	10,971
6 December 1930	Blackburn Rovers	A	1–4	Rowley	10,802
13 December 1930	Derby County	H	2–1	Reid, Spence	9,701
20 December 1930	Leeds United	A	0–5		11,282
25 December 1930	Bolton Wanderers	A	1–3	Reid	22,662
26 December 1930	Bolton Wanderers	H	1–1	Reid	12,741
27 December 1930	Aston Villa	A	0–7		32,505
1 January 1931	Leeds United	H	0–0		9,875
3 January 1931	Chelsea	H	1–0	Warburton	8,966
17 January 1931	Newcastle United	A	3–4	Warburton (2), Reid	24,835
28 January 1931	Sheffield Wednesday	H	4–1	Hopkinson, Reid, Spence, Warburton	6,077
31 January 1931	Grimsby Town	A	1–2	Reid	9,305
7 February 1931	Manchester City	H	1–3	Spence	39,876
14 February 1931	West Ham United	H	1–0	Gallimore	9,745
21 February 1931	Arsenal	A	1–4	Thomson	41,510
7 March 1931	Birmingham	A	0–0		17,678
16 March 1931	Portsmouth	H	0–1		4,808
21 March 1931	Blackpool	A	1–5	Hopkinson	13,162
25 March 1931	Leicester City	H	0–0		3,679
28 March 1931	Sheffield United	H	1–2	Hopkinson	5,420
3 April 1931	Liverpool	A	1–1	Wilson	27,782
4 April 1931	Sunderland	A	2–1	Hopkinson, Reid	13,590
6 April 1931	Liverpool	H	4–1	Reid (2), McLenahan, Rowley	8,058
11 April 1931	Blackburn Rovers	H	0–1		6,414
18 April 1931	Derby County	A	1–6	Spence	6,610
2 May 1931	Middlesbrough	H	4–4	Reid (2), Bennion, Gallimore	3,969

Pos	Team	Pld	W	D	L	GF	GA	GAv	Pts	Relegation
18	West Ham United	42	14	8	20	79	94	0.840	36	
19	Birmingham	42	13	10	19	55	70	0.786	36	
20	Blackpool	42	11	10	21	71	125	0.568	32	
21	Leeds United (R)	42	12	7	23	68	81	0.840	31	Relegation to the Second Division
22	Manchester United (R)	42	7	8	27	53	115	0.461	22	Relegation to the Second Division

Source: World Football
Rules for classification: 1) Points; 2) Goal average; 3) Goals scored
(R) Relegated

== FA Cup ==
Date	Round	Opponents	H / A	Result F–A	Scorers	Attendance
10 January 1931	Round 3	Stoke City	A	3–3	Reid (3)	23,415
14 January 1931	Round 3 Replay	Stoke City	H	0–0		22,013
19 January 1931	Round 3 Replay	Stoke City	N	4–2	Hopkinson (2), Gallimore, Spence	11,788
24 January 1931	Round 4	Grimsby Town	A	0–1		15,000

== Squad statistics ==
Pos.	Name	League		FA Cup		Total	
Pos.	Name	Apps	Goals	Apps	Goals	Apps	Goals
GK	(England) Arthur Chesters	4	0	0	0	4	0
GK	(England) Alf Steward	38	0	4	0	42	0
FB	(Wales) Thomas Jones	5	0	0	0	5	0
FB	(England) Jack Mellor	35	0	4	0	39	0
FB	(England) Jack Silcock	25	0	0	0	25	0
HB	(Wales) Ray Bennion	36	1	4	0	40	1
HB	(England) Bill Dale	22	0	4	0	26	0
HB	(England) Lal Hilditch	25	0	4	0	29	0
HB	(England) George Lydon	1	0	0	0	1	0
HB	(England) Hugh McLenahan	21	1	0	0	21	1
HB	(England) Thomas Parker	9	0	0	0	9	0
HB	(England) Frank Williams	3	0	0	0	3	0
HB	(England) Jack Wilson	20	1	2	0	22	1
FW	(England) Jimmy Bullock	10	3	0	0	10	3
FW	(England) Stanley Gallimore	28	5	4	1	32	6
FW	(England) Samuel Hopkinson	17	4	2	2	19	6
FW	(Scotland) George McLachlan	42	2	4	0	46	2
FW	(England) Charlie Ramsden	7	0	2	0	9	0
FW	(Scotland) Tommy Reid	30	17	3	3	33	20
FW	(England) Harry Rowley	29	7	0	0	29	7
FW	(England) Joe Spence	35	6	2	1	37	7
FW	(England) Arthur Thomson	2	1	1	0	3	1
FW	(England) Arthur Warburton	18	5	4	0	22	5
