= 1931–32 Manchester United F.C. season =

English football club season

Manchester United
1931–32 season
- Chairman: George Lawton (until December 1931); James W. Gibson (from December 1931)
- Manager: Herbert Bamlett (until 9 November 1931); Walter Crickmer (from 9 November 1931)
- Second Division: 12th
- FA Cup: Third Round
- Top goalscorer: League: Joe Spence (19); All: Joe Spence (19)
- Highest home attendance: 37,012 vs Charlton Athletic (25 March 1932)
- Lowest home attendance: 3,507 vs Southampton (2 September 1931)
- Average home league attendance: 12,915
Home colours

The 1931–32 season was Manchester United's 36th season in the Football League.

The season saw Herbert Bamlett sacked as manager on 9 November 1931 after a dismal run of form in the league, and Walter Crickmer recruited as his successor on the same day. United recovered well in the league after his appointment and finished 12th, banishing fears of a second successive relegation which would have pushed them into the Third Division North for the first time. At the end of the season Scott Duncan replaced Walter Crickmer as the full-time manager.

== Second Division ==
Date	Opponents	H / A	Result F–A	Scorers	Attendance
29 August 1931	Bradford Park Avenue	A	1–3	Reid	16,239
2 September 1931	Southampton	H	2–3	Ferguson, Johnston	3,507
5 September 1931	Swansea Town	H	2–1	Hopkinson, Reid	6,763
7 September 1931	Stoke City	A	0–3		10,518
12 September 1931	Tottenham Hotspur	H	1–1	Johnston	9,557
16 September 1931	Stoke City	H	1–1	Spence	5,025
19 September 1931	Nottingham Forest	A	1–2	Gallimore	10,166
26 September 1931	Chesterfield	H	3–1	Warburton (2), Johnston	10,834
3 October 1931	Burnley	A	0–2		9,719
10 October 1931	Preston North End	H	3–2	Gallimore, Johnston, Spence	8,496
17 October 1931	Barnsley	A	0–0		4,052
24 October 1931	Notts County	H	3–3	Gallimore, Mann, Spence	6,694
31 October 1931	Plymouth Argyle	A	1–3	Johnston	22,555
7 November 1931	Leeds United	H	2–5	Spence (2)	9,512
14 November 1931	Oldham Athletic	A	5–1	Johnston (2), Spence (2), Mann	10,922
21 November 1931	Bury	H	1–2	Spence	11,745
28 November 1931	Port Vale	A	2–1	Spence (2)	6,955
5 December 1931	Millwall	H	2–0	Gallimore, Spence	6,396
12 December 1931	Bradford City	A	3–4	Spence (2), Johnston	13,215
19 December 1931	Bristol City	H	0–1		4,697
25 December 1931	Wolverhampton Wanderers	H	3–2	Hopkinson, Reid, Spence	33,123
26 December 1931	Wolverhampton Wanderers	A	0–7		37,207
2 January 1932	Bradford Park Avenue	H	0–2		6,056
16 January 1932	Swansea Town	A	1–3	Warburton	5,888
23 January 1932	Tottenham Hotspur	A	1–4	Reid	19,139
30 January 1932	Nottingham Forest	H	3–2	Reid (3)	11,152
6 February 1932	Chesterfield	A	3–1	Reid (2), Spence	9,457
17 February 1932	Burnley	H	5–1	Johnston (2), Ridding (2), Gallimore	11,036
20 February 1932	Preston North End	A	0–0		13,353
27 February 1932	Barnsley	H	3–0	Hopkinson (2), Gallimore	18,223
5 March 1932	Notts County	A	2–1	Hopkinson, Reid	10,817
12 March 1932	Plymouth Argyle	H	2–1	Spence (2)	24,827
19 March 1932	Leeds United	A	4–1	Reid (2), Johnston, Ridding	13,644
25 March 1932	Charlton Athletic	H	0–2		37,012
26 March 1932	Oldham Athletic	H	5–1	Reid (3), Fitton, Spence	17,886
28 March 1932	Charlton Athletic	A	0–1		16,256
2 April 1932	Bury	A	0–0		12,592
9 April 1932	Port Vale	H	2–0	Reid, Spence	10,916
16 April 1932	Millwall	A	1–1	Reid	9,087
23 April 1932	Bradford City	H	1–0	Fitton	17,765
30 April 1932	Bristol City	A	1–2	Black	5,874
7 May 1932	Southampton	A	1–1	Black	6,128

Pos	Team	Pld	W	D	L	GF	GA	GAv	Pts
10	Charlton Athletic	42	17	9	16	61	66	0.924	43
11	Nottingham Forest	42	16	10	16	77	72	1.069	42
12	Manchester United	42	17	8	17	71	72	0.986	42
13	Preston North End	42	16	10	16	75	77	0.974	42
14	Southampton	42	17	7	18	66	77	0.857	41

Rules for classification: 1) Points; 2) Goal average; 3) Goals scored

== FA Cup ==
Date	Round	Opponents	H / A	Result F–A	Scorers	Attendance
9 January 1932	Round 3	Plymouth Argyle	A	1–4	Reid	28,000
