= Mellor =

Mellor is an English surname.

== Notable people with this surname ==
- Alan Mellor (born 1959), English cricketer
- Anne K. Mellor (born 1942), feminist scholar of Romantic literature
- Bernard Mellor (1917–1998), British academic
- Chip Mellor (born 1950), President and General Counsel of the Institute for Justice
- Corin Mellor (born 1966), English silverware designer
- Danie Mellor (born 1971), Australian artist
- David Mellor (born 1949), British former MP
- David Mellor (designer) (1930–2009), English designer
- David Alan Mellor, curator and art historian
- David Hugh Mellor (born 1938), English philosopher
- David Paver Mellor (1903–1980), Australian inorganic chemist
- Frank Mellor (1854–1925), English lawyer and cricketer
- Ian Mellor (1950–2024), English footballer
- Jack Mellor (born 1906, date of death unknown), English footballer
- Janine Mellor (born 1980), English actress
- Joe Mellor (born 1990), English rugby league player
- John Mellor (disambiguation), multiple people
- Joseph Mellor, founder of Mellor Brothers, a farm machinery manufacturer in South Australia
- Joseph Mellor (1869–1938), English chemist
- Julie Mellor DBE (born 1957), English Parliamentarian
- Karen Mellor (born 1963), winner of Miss United Kingdom
- Kay Mellor (1951–2022), English actress
- M. Mellor (active 1880s), English footballer
- Malcolm Mellor Australian glaciologist, after whom Mellor Glacier was named
- Marq Mellor (born 1968), American field hockey player
- Neil Mellor (born 1982), English footballer, son of Ian
- Oliver Mellor (born 1981), English actor
- Paul Mellor (priest), Kenneth Paul Mellor (born 1949), Anglican priest
- Paul Mellor (born 1974), Australian rugby league player
- Peter Mellor (born 1947), English-born American footballer and coach
- Robert B. Mellor (born Yorkshire), British scientist
- Salusbury Mellor (1863–1917), British sailor and Olympian
- Stan Mellor (1937–2020), English jockey
- Stephen J. Mellor, American computer scientist
- Steven Mellor (swimmer) (born 1973), British swimmer
- Syd Mellor (born 1989), English footballer
- Thomas Walton Mellor (1814–1902), British cotton manufacturer
- Will Mellor (born 1976), British actor
- William Mellor (1888–1942), British journalist
- William Mellor (footballer), English footballer
- William C. Mellor (1903–1963), American cinematographer

== See also ==
Personal name:

- Mellor Baronets

Place name:

- Mellor Glacier
- Mellor, Greater Manchester
- Mellor, Lancashire
