= Gallimore =

Gallimore is an English surname. Notable people with the surname include:

- Alec D. Gallimore, American aerospace engineer
- Angie Gallimore, English footballer
- Byron Gallimore, American record producer
- Dan Gallimore (born 2003), English footballer
- Eddie Gallimore (born 1964), American politician
- George Gallimore (1886–1949), British footballer
- Jamie Gallimore (born 1957), Canadian ice hockey player
- Lesle Gallimore (born 1963), American soccer coach
- María Gallimore (born 1989), Panamanian model
- Neville Gallimore (born 1997), American football player
- Neville Eden Gallimore, Jamaican politician
- Stanley Gallimore (1910–1994), British footballer
- Tony Gallimore (born 1972), British footballer

== See also ==
- Gallimore, Virginia
