= Tom Frame =

Tom Frame may refer to:

- Tom Frame (bishop) (born 1962), Australian Anglican bishop and author
- Tom Frame (letterer) (1931–2006), British comics letterer
- Tommy Frame (1902–1986), Scottish footballer
