= John Howarth =

John Howarth may refer to:

- John Howarth (politician) (born 1958), British Labour Party politician and MEP
- John Howarth (cricketer) (born 1945), English county cricketer
- John Howarth (footballer) (1899–?), English footballer

== See also ==
- John Haworth
