= William Dale =

William or Bill Dale may refer to:

- Bill Dale (footballer) (1905–1987), English footballer
- Bill Dale (athlete) (1917–2010), Canadian athlete
- Billy Dale (footballer) (born 1925), English footballer
- William Dale (politician) (c. 1830–1904), politician and teetotaler in South Australia
