= Frank Williams (footballer, born 1908) =

English footballer

Personal information
- Full name: Frank H. Williams
- Date of birth: 1908
- Place of birth: Kearsley, Lancashire, England
- Date of death: Unknown
- Height: 5 ft 9 in (1.75 m)
- Position: Wing-half

Senior career*
Years	Team	Apps	(Gls)
–1927	Stalybridge Celtic		
1927	Manchester United		
1927–1928	Stalybridge Celtic		
1928–?	Manchester United	3	(0)
- Altrincham
- * Club domestic league appearances and goals

Frank H. Williams (1908 – unknown) was an English footballer who played as a wing-half. Born in Kearsley, Lancashire, he played for Stalybridge Celtic, Manchester United and Altrincham. He originally signed for Manchester United as an amateur towards the end of the 1926–27 season, but then returned to Stalybridge for the 1927–28 season, before joining United as a professional in May 1928. He was reinstated as an amateur in September 1929 and became a regular in the Manchester United reserve team. Standing in for Ray Bennion in the half-back line, Williams' professional debut came on 13 September 1930, in a 7–4 defeat at home to Newcastle United, and was followed by two consecutive 3–0 defeats to Huddersfield Town and Sheffield Wednesday. United finished the 42-game league season bottom of the table with just 22 points, their worst total since their first two seasons in the Football League, when only 30 matches were played. Williams later moved to Altrincham, where he was also manager shortly after the Second World War.
