= Walter Rowley =

English footballer (1891–1976)

Personal information
- Full name: Walter James Rowley
- Date of birth: 14 April 1891
- Place of birth: Little Hulton, England
- Date of death: 22 March 1976 (aged 84)
- Place of death: Shrewsbury, England
- Height: 5 ft 9 3/4 in (1.77 m)
- Position: Right-half

Youth career
- Farnworth Wednesday
- Walkden Wednesday
- Little Hulton Wednesday

Senior career*
Years	Team	Apps	(Gls)
1910–1912	Oldham Athletic	0	(0)
1912–1925	Bolton Wanderers	175	(7)
Total		175	(7)

Managerial career
- 1944–1950: Bolton Wanderers
- 1952–1954: Middlesbrough
- 1955–1957: Shrewsbury Town
- * Club domestic league appearances and goals

Walter James Rowley (14 April 1891 – 22 March 1976) was an English footballer around World War I and a manager during and after World War II. He spent some 47 years playing and coaching in the Football League.

He played for Oldham Athletic and Bolton Wanderers, spending 13 years with the latter club. After spending many years as part of Bolton's backroom staff, he was appointed manager in August 1944. He spent six years in charge before retiring due to ill health. He coached Middlesbrough from June 1952 to February 1954 before again stepping aside due to illness. His final management role was at Shrewsbury Town from July 1955 until June 1957.

== Playing career ==
Rowley played village football before joining Oldham Athletic of the Football League First Division in 1910. The "Latics" finished seventh in 1910–11 and 18th in 1911–12 (just one place and one point above the relegation zone). He left Boundary Park and moved on to Bolton Wanderers in 1912, and made his debut against West Bromwich Albion in February 1913. The "Trotters" finished eighth in 1912–13, sixth in 1913–14, and 17th in 1914–15. During the war he played two games for Port Vale in 1919 in the war league, before returning to Burnden Park. Bolton finished sixth in 1919–20, third in 1920–21, sixth again in 1921–22, and 13th in 1922–23. Wanderers also won the FA Cup. However, Rowley missed the 1923 FA Cup final against West Ham United because he was serving a six-week suspension for being sent off against Huddersfield Town. They went on to finish in fourth place in 1923–24 and third place in 1924–25. He retired through injury in May 1925 and joined the club's coaching staff. He had made 191 league and FA Cup appearances for the club, scoring seven goals.

== Managerial career ==
=== Bolton Wanderers ===
Rowley became a coach with Bolton before he took over as manager at the latter end of World War II, before the Football League proper started, following Charles Foweraker's retirement in August 1944. During his reign the club won the Football League North War Cup, and made First Division league finishes of 18th in 1946–47, 17th in 1947–48, 14th in 1948–49, and 16th in 1949–50. Rowley had to resign due to ill health in October 1950. He was made a life member of the club for his 37 years of service as a player, coach and manager. His successor, Bill Ridding, led Bolton to eighth spot in 1950–51.

=== Middlesbrough ===
He fully recovered and took over at Middlesbrough in 1952. He led the Ayresome Park club to 13th in the First Division in 1952–53. Ill health again forced him to resign in March 1954, and his replacement, Bob Dennison, failed to steer the club away from the relegation zone by the end of the 1953–54 campaign.

=== Shrewsbury Town ===
Fully fit again, Rowley returned to management at Shrewsbury Town in 1955. Under his stewardship, the "Shrews" posted 13th and ninth-place finishes in the Third Division South in 1955–56 and 1956–57. He left the game after departing the Gay Meadow.

== Career statistics ==
=== Playing statistics ===
Appearances and goals by club, season and competition
Club	Season	First Division		FA Cup		Total	
Club	Season	Apps	Goals	Apps	Goals	Apps	Goals
Bolton Wanderers	1912–13	9	0	0	0	9	0
Bolton Wanderers	1913–14	24	1	3	0	27	1
Bolton Wanderers	1914–15	29	1	7	0	36	1
Bolton Wanderers	1919–20	26	2	0	0	26	2
Bolton Wanderers	1920–21	16	1	0	0	16	1
Bolton Wanderers	1921–22	13	1	1	0	14	1
Bolton Wanderers	1922–23	33	1	5	0	38	1
Bolton Wanderers	1923–24	14	0	0	0	14	0
Bolton Wanderers	1924–25	11	0	0	0	11	0
Bolton Wanderers	Total	175	7	16	0	191	7

=== Managerial statistics ===
Managerial record by team and tenure
Team	From	To	Record				
Team	From	To	G	W	D	L	Win %
Bolton Wanderers	1 August 1944	1 October 1950	197	64	44	89	32.49
Middlesbrough	1 June 1952	1 February 1954	73	22	16	35	30.14
Shrewsbury Town	1 July 1955	1 June 1957	97	33	32	32	34.02
Total			367	119	92	156	32.43
