= George Haslam (footballer) =

English footballer

Personal information
- Full name: George Haslam
- Date of birth: 23 March 1898
- Place of birth: Turton, Lancashire, England
- Date of death: 13 August 1980 (aged 82)
- Place of death: Bolton, England
- Height: 6 ft 1/2 in (1.84 m)
- Position: Centre-half

Senior career*
Years	Team	Apps	(Gls)
- Darwen
1921–1927	Manchester United	25	(0)
1927–1928	Portsmouth	4	(0)
1928	Ashton National		
1928–1929	Whitchurch		
1929–1930	Lancaster Town		
1930–1931	Chorley		
1931	Burscough Rangers		
1931–1932	Northwich Victoria		
- * Club domestic league appearances and goals

George Haslam (born 23 March 1898 – 13 August 1980) was an English footballer who played as a centre-half. Born in Turton, Lancashire, he began his career with Darwen before joining Manchester United in May 1921, signed along with John Howarth for a combined fee of £750. He made his debut nine months later in a 1–1 draw at home to Birmingham City on 25 February 1922. In just over six seasons with Manchester United, Haslam made just 27 appearances for the first team, although he was a regular for the reserves, whom he captained to second place in The Central League in 1926–27. In April 1927, he shared a benefit match against Sunderland with club veterans Lal Hilditch and Jack Silcock. Haslam was transferred to Portsmouth for a fee of £2,500 in November 1927, but left at the end of the season, returning to Lancashire to play for Cheshire County League side Ashton National. He became something of a journeyman in his later career, playing no more than a season for each of Whitchurch, Lancaster Town, Chorley, Burscough Rangers and Northwich Victoria.
