= John Mellor =

John Mellor may refer to:

- Sir John Mellor (judge) (1809–1887), English judge and politician
- John Graham Mellor (1952–2002), English musician who performed as Joe Strummer
- John James Mellor (1830–1916), English industrialist
- Sir John Mellor, 1st Baronet (1862–1929), English lawyer and Treasury Solicitor
- Sir John Mellor, 2nd Baronet (1893–1986), English politician
- John Seymour Mellor (1883-1962), Scottish officer in the British Army
- John William Mellor (1835–1911), English lawyer
- John Williams Mellor, (born 1928), French-born American economist
- John White Mellor (1868–1931), Australian ornithologist

== See also ==
- Jack Mellor (footballer, born 1896), English footballer
- Jack Mellor (born 1906), English footballer
