= John Howarth (footballer) =

English footballer

Personal information
- Full name: John Thomas Howarth
- Date of birth: 1899
- Place of birth: Darwen, Lancashire, England
- Height: 5 ft 8 1/2 in (1.74 m)
- Position: Full-back

Senior career*
Years	Team	Apps	(Gls)
- Darwen
1921–1923	Manchester United	4	(0)
- * Club domestic league appearances and goals

John Thomas Howarth (1899–unknown) was an English footballer who played as a full-back. Born in Darwen, Lancashire, he began his career with his hometown club, Darwen F.C., before moving to Manchester United in May 1921 in a £750 joint transfer that also brought George Haslam to Old Trafford. He made his debut in January 1922 in a 3–0 away defeat to Sheffield United, playing alongside Charlie Radford in the absence of Jack Silcock. Howarth played three more games that season, this time with Silcock in place of Radford, including a 3–2 win in the return fixture against Sheffield United. Manchester United were relegated at the end of the season, but although they used 29 players in the Second Division in 1922–23, Howarth never played for the club again. He was transfer-listed at the end of the season, but was reported to still be without a club by the start of the 1927–28 season.
