= Arthur Thomson (footballer, born 1903) =

English footballer

Arthur Thomson (July 1903 – June 1983) was an English footballer who played as a forward. Born in West Stanley, County Durham, he played for West Stanley, Craghead United, Morecambe, Southend United Tranmere Rovers and Manchester United.
