= Thomas Parker (footballer) =

English footballer

Personal information
- Full name: Thomas Albert Parker
- Date of birth: 22 November 1906
- Place of birth: Eccles, Lancashire, England
- Date of death: 11 November 1964 (aged 57)
- Height: 5 ft 10 in (1.78 m)
- Position: Centre-half

Senior career*
Years	Team	Apps	(Gls)
?–1930	Morton	?	(?)
1930–1932	Manchester United	17	(0)
1932–1934	Bristol City	54	(1)
1934–1935	Carlisle United	18	(0)
1935–?	Stalybridge Celtic	?	(?)
- * Club domestic league appearances and goals

Thomas Albert Parker (22 November 1906 – 11 November 1964) was an English footballer. His regular position was at centre-half. He was born in Eccles, Lancashire. He played for Manchester United, Bristol City, Carlisle United and Stalybridge Celtic.
