= John Ferguson (footballer, born 1904) =

English footballer (1904–1973)

Personal information
- Full name: John Joseph Ferguson
- Date of birth: 12 December 1904
- Place of birth: Rowlands Gill, County Durham, England
- Date of death: 23 February 1973 (aged 68)
- Position: Forward

Senior career*
Years	Team	Apps	(Gls)
1926–1927	Grimsby Town	3	(0)
- Workington
- Spen Black and White
1928–1929	Wolverhampton Wanderers	20	(4)
1929–1930	Watford	4	(0)
- Burton Town
1931	Manchester United	8	(1)
- Derry City
1934–1935	Gateshead	21	(5)
- * Club domestic league appearances and goals

John Joseph Ferguson (12 December 1904 – 23 February 1973) was an English footballer who played for a number of clubs as a forward.

== Clubs ==
He turned out for Grimsby Town, Workington, Spen Black and White, Wolverhampton Wanderers, Watford, Burton Town, Manchester United, Derry City, and Gateshead.
