= William Stewart (footballer, born 1910) =

Scottish footballer

Personal information
- Full name: William J. Todd Stewart
- Date of birth: 24 April 1910
- Place of birth: Glasgow, Scotland
- Height: 5 ft 6 in (1.68 m)
- Position: Outside left

Senior career*
Years	Team	Apps	(Gls)
–1931	Shettleston		
1931–1932	Cowdenbeath	51	(10)
1932–1934	Manchester United	46	(7)
1934–1939	Motherwell	30	(9)
1936–1937	→ Albion Rovers (loan)	11	(1)
1938	→ Alloa Athletic (loan)	10	(3)

Managerial career
- 1949: Clyde Pinelands
- * Club domestic league appearances and goals

William J. Todd Stewart was a Scottish professional footballer who played as an outside left in the Scottish League for Cowdenbeath, Motherwell, Albion Rovers and Alloa Athletic. He also played in the Football League for Manchester United. After his retirement from football, he managed South African club Clyde Pinelands.

== Personal life ==
After retiring from football, Stewart emigrated to South Africa.

== Career statistics ==
Appearances and goals by club, season and competition
Club	Season	League			National Cup		Total	
Club	Season	Division	Apps	Goals	Apps	Goals	Apps	Goals
Cowdenbeath	1931–32	Scottish First Division	35	6	2	3	37	9
Cowdenbeath	1932–33	Scottish First Division	16	4	—		16	4
Cowdenbeath	Total		51	10	2	3	53	13
Manchester United	1932–33	Second Division	21	3	1	0	22	3
Manchester United	1933–34	Second Division	25	4	2	0	27	4
Manchester United	Total		46	7	3	0	49	7
Motherwell	1933–34	Scottish First Division	3	4	1	0	4	4
Motherwell	1934–35	Scottish First Division	4	0	0	0	4	0
Motherwell	1935–36	Scottish First Division	11	3	0	0	11	3
Motherwell	1936–37	Scottish First Division	12	2	—		12	2
Motherwell	Total		30	9	1	0	31	9
Albion Rovers (loan)	1936–37	Scottish First Division	11	1	1	0	12	1
Alloa Athletic (loan)	1937–38	Scottish Second Division	10	3	1	0	11	3
Career total			148	30	8	0	156	30

== Honours ==
- Cowdenbeath Hall of Fame
