= Gallimore, Virginia =

Unincorporated community in Virginia, US

Coordinates: 37°04′48″N 80°46′14″W

Gallimore is an unincorporated community in Pulaski County, in the U.S. state of Virginia.
