= Alf Steward =

English footballer and manager

Alfred Steward (born 18 September 1896 in Manchester, Lancashire) was an English football player and manager. He also played cricket for Lancashire's second eleven, though he did not appear in first-class cricket.

Steward, a goalkeeper, played football in the army between 1915 and 1918, before joining Stalybridge Celtic. In 1919 he joined Manchester United as an amateur, as cover for United first choice keeper Jack Mew. While an amateur he also played for Heaton Park before turning professional with United in January 1920. His United debut came in October that year, keeping a clean sheet in a 1–0 win at home to Preston North End. He finally became a regular in the United side in the 1923–24 season, and was an ever-present the following season as United won promotion, as runners-up, to the First Division. Between April 1924 and September 1927 Steward missed only 7 league games out of a possible 139 for United, before losing his place to Lance Robinson. He regained his first team place in April 1928 and went on to play a further 149 games before leaving Old Trafford in June 1932, joining Manchester North End as player-manager.

He led North End to the final of the Cheshire County League Cup against Altrincham at the end of the 1932–33 season, a final in which he managed to play for both sides. The final finished in a 3–3 draw, but the replay was held over until the following season, by which time Steward had joined Altrincham as player-manager. Altrincham won the replay 4–1, and later that season made the 1st Round of the FA Cup for the first time, losing to Gainsborough Trinity. They also won the Cheshire Senior Cup.

He finally retired as a player during the 1937–38 season, making just two appearances that season. In May 1938 he took over as secretary-manager at Division Three (South) side Torquay United. Torquay finished 19th in his only full season with the club, World War II intervening. He remained at Torquay until the club closed for the war in May 1940.
