= Lance Richardson =

English footballer

Lancelot Holliday Richardson (1 April 1899 – 22 September 1958) was an English footballer. His regular position was as a goalkeeper. He was born in Tow Law, County Durham. He played for South Shields, Chopwell, Manchester United, Reading and Instituto Atlético Central Córdoba.
