= Herbert Mann =

English footballer

Herbert Harry Mann (30 December 1907 – 24 April 1977) was an English footballer. His regular position was as a forward. He was born in Nuneaton, Warwickshire. He played for Griff Colliery, Derby County, Grantham Town, Ripley Town, and Manchester United.
