= Tommy Frame =

Scottish footballer

Personal information
- Full name: Thomas Frame
- Date of birth: 5 September 1902
- Place of birth: Burnbank, Scotland
- Date of death: 17 January 1986 (aged 83)
- Place of death: Paisley, Scotland
- Height: 5 ft 11 in (1.80 m)
- Position: Centre half

Senior career*
Years	Team	Apps	(Gls)
1925–1926	Burnbank Athletic		
1926–1932	Cowdenbeath	162	(8)
1926–1927	→ Lochgelly United (loan)		
1932–1934	Manchester United	51	(4)
1936–1937	Southport	38	(0)
1937–1938	Rhyl Athletic		
- Bridgnorth Town
- Babcock & Wilcox
- * Club domestic league appearances and goals

Thomas Frame (5 September 1902 – 17 January 1986) was a Scottish professional footballer who made over 160 appearances as a centre half in the Scottish League for Cowdenbeath. He also played in the Football League for Manchester United and Southport.

== Career statistics ==
Appearances and goals by club, season and competition
Club	Season	League			National cup (Note: Includes Scottish Cup, FA Cup)		Other		Total	
Club	Season	Division	Apps	Goals	Apps	Goals	Apps	Goals	Apps	Goals
Cowdenbeath	1926–27	Scottish First Division	11	0	0	0	—		11	0
Cowdenbeath	1927–28	Scottish First Division	10	0	0	0	—		10	0
Cowdenbeath	1928–29	Scottish First Division	24	2	3	1	—		27	3
Cowdenbeath	1929–30	Scottish First Division	37	0	3	0	—		40	0
Cowdenbeath	1930–31	Scottish First Division	38	1	5	0	—		43	2
Cowdenbeath	1931–32	Scottish First Division	33	4	2	0	—		35	4
Cowdenbeath	1932–33	Scottish First Division	9	1	0	0	—		9	1
Cowdenbeath	Total		162	8	13	1	—		175	9
Manchester United	1932–33	Second Division	33	2	1	0	—		34	2
Manchester United	1933–34	Second Division	18	2	0	0	—		18	2
Manchester United	Total		51	4	1	0	—		52	4
Southport	1936–37	Third Division North	38	0	0	0	4 (Note: Appearances in Third Division North Cup)	0	42	0
Career total			251	12	14	1	4	0	269	13

== Honours ==
- Cowdenbeath Hall of Fame
