= Billy Dale (footballer) =

English footballer

Personal information
- Full name: Frederick William Dale
- Date of birth: 26 October 1925
- Place of birth: Balby, England
- Date of death: 26 November 2011 (aged 86)
- Position: Winger

Senior career*
Years	Team	Apps	(Gls)
- Scunthorpe United
1949–1952	Halifax Town	47	(5)
1952–1954	Southport	4	(0)
1954	Accrington Stanley	1	(0)
1954–1955	Crewe Alexandra	4	(3)
1955	Cheltenham Town	?	(?)
1955–1956	Retford United	?	(?)
Total		122	(24)
- * Club domestic league appearances and goals

Frederick William Dale (26 October 1925 – 26 November 2011) was an English professional footballer who played as a winger in the Football League.
