= Ray Bennion =

Welsh footballer

Personal information
- Full name: Samuel Raymond Bennion
- Date of birth: 1 September 1896
- Place of birth: Summerhill, Wrexham, Wales
- Date of death: 12 March 1968 (aged 71)
- Place of death: Burnley, England
- Height: 5 ft 8 in (1.73 m)
- Position: Right-half

Youth career
- Gwersyllt School
- Ragtimes
- 1919–1921: Crichton's Athletic

Senior career*
Years	Team	Apps	(Gls)
1921–1932	Manchester United	286	(2)
1932–1934	Burnley	31	(0)

International career
1925–1931	Wales	10	(0)
- * Club domestic league appearances and goals

Samuel Raymond Bennion (1 September 1896 – 12 March 1968) was a Welsh footballer who played as a right-half in the Football League during the 1920s and 1930s. In his early life, he played for Gwersyllt School. He then played for Ragtimes and Crichton's Athletic, winning the Cheshire County Challenge Cup with the latter before joining Manchester United in April 1921. His debut for United came on 27 August 1921 against Everton at Goodison Park. After scoring three goals in 301 appearances for the club, he moved to Burnley in November 1932 and was appointed as a coach there two years later. He was capped 10 times for Wales, making his debut on 31 October 1925 against Scotland at Ninian Park. He retired in 1964 due to ill health.
