= Arthur Fitton =

English footballer and cricketer

George Arthur Fitton (30 May 1902 – 10 September 1984) was an English footballer and cricketer. His regular position was as a forward. He was born in Melton Mowbray, Leicestershire. He played for West Bromwich Albion, Preston North End, and Manchester United.

He also played cricket for Staffordshire in the Minor Counties Championship, where as a left-handed batsman and occasional wicket-keeper, he played from 1927 to 1934, making 25 appearances.
