= Stewart Chalmers =

Scottish footballer (1907–1989)

Personal information
- Full name: William Stewart Chalmers
- Date of birth: 5 March 1907
- Place of birth: Cathcart, Scotland
- Date of death: 13 November 1989 (aged 82)
- Place of death: Saltcoats, Scotland
- Position: Inside right

Youth career
- Mount Florida

Senior career*
Years	Team	Apps	(Gls)
1924–1929	Queen's Park	92	(22)
1929–1932	Heart of Midlothian	55	(13)
1932–1934	Manchester United	34	(1)
1934–1938	Dunfermline Athletic	116	(20)
Total		297	(56)

International career
1929	Scotland	1	(0)
- * Club domestic league appearances and goals

William Stewart Chalmers (5 March 1907 – 13 November 1989) was a Scottish amateur football inside right who played for Queens Park, Heart of Midlothian, Manchester United, Dunfermline Athletic and the Scotland national team.

== Career ==
Chalmers was born and grew up in the southern Glasgow suburb of Mount Florida, in the vicinity of Hampden Park. He joined local side Queen's Park and played five seasons with them while he completed his studies. He turned professional in 1929, when he joined Edinburgh side Heart of Midlothian. He moved to Manchester United in September 1932 and then returned to Scotland with Dunfermline Athletic in 1934, where he finished his playing career.

Chalmers played once for the Scotland national football team, against Ireland at Windsor Park in front of 30,000 people. The game ended 7–3 to Scotland. He was one of the last players to be capped by the full national side while still an amateur.

Chalmers was a trained chartered accountant and continued in this profession after his playing retirement.
