= Ernest Vincent =

English footballer

Ernie Vincent
Personal information
- Full name: Ernest Vincent
- Date of birth: 28 October 1907
- Place of birth: Seaham Harbour, England
- Date of death: 2 June 1978 (aged 70)
- Position: Half back

Senior career*
| Years | Team | Apps | (Gls) |
| 1930–1932 | Southport | 58 | (0) |
| 1932–1935 | Manchester United | 64 | (1) |
| 1935–1937 | Queens Park Ranger | 28 | (0) |
| 1937–1938 | Doncaster Rovers | 1 | (0) |
- * Club domestic league appearances and goals

Ernest Vincent (28 October 1910 – 2 June 1978) was an English footballer. His regular position was at half back. He was born in Seaham, County Durham. He played for Dawdon Colliery, Ryhope Colliery, Seaham Harbour, Washington Colliery, Southport, Manchester United, Queens Park Rangers and Doncaster Rovers.
