= Willie McDonald =

Scottish footballer

Personal information
- Date of birth: 9 July 1905
- Place of birth: Coatbridge, Scotland
- Date of death: 1979 (aged 73–74)
- Height: 5 ft 9 in (1.75 m)
- Position: Inside forward

Senior career*
Years	Team	Apps	(Gls)
- Law Scotia
1925–1926	Dundee United	3	(0)
1926	Broxburn United		
1926–1927	Albion Rovers	2	(0)
1927–1928	Armadale	3	(2)
1928–1932	Airdrieonians	125	(25)
1932–1934	Manchester United	27	(4)
1934–1936	Tranmere Rovers	81	(19)
1936–1939	Coventry City	91	(24)
1939–1940	Plymouth Argyle	0	(0)
Total		329	(74)
- * Club domestic league appearances and goals

William McDonald (9 July 1905 – 1979) was a Scottish footballer who played as an inside forward. Born in Coatbridge, Lanarkshire, he played for Law Scotia, Dundee United, Broxburn United, Albion Rovers, Armadale, Airdrieonians, Manchester United, Tranmere Rovers, Coventry City and Plymouth Argyle.
