= Dick Black (footballer) =

Scottish footballer

Arthur Richard Black (18 February 1907 – unknown) was a Scottish footballer. His regular position was as a forward. He was born in Airdrie. He played for Stenhousemuir, Blantyre Victoria, Greenock Morton, St Mirren, and Manchester United.
