= Bill Ridding =

English footballer (1911–1981)

Personal information
- Full name: William Ridding
- Date of birth: 4 April 1911
- Place of birth: Heswall, Cheshire, England
- Date of death: 20 September 1981 (aged 70)
- Position: Forward

Youth career
- Heswall PSA

Senior career*
Years	Team	Apps	(Gls)
1928–1930	Tranmere Rovers	17	(13)
1930–1931	Manchester City	9	(4)
1931–1934	Manchester United	42	(14)
1934	Northampton Town	0	(0)
1935	Tranmere Rovers	1	(0)
1935–1936	Oldham Athletic	1	(0)

Managerial career
- 1942–1946: Tranmere Rovers
- 1950–1968: Bolton Wanderers
- * Club domestic league appearances and goals

William Ridding (4 April 1911 – 20 September 1981) also known as Nibbler Ridding, was an English football player and manager, most notably in a 17-year period managing Bolton Wanderers between 1951 and 1968, during which time the club won the 1958 FA Cup.

== Playing career ==
Ridding started his playing career at Tranmere Rovers in 1928, where he had his most successful run, scoring 12 goals in 13 games, before being transferred to Manchester City in early 1930, for £3,500. He only made a handful of appearances for City before, in 1931, he was transferred to cross-town rivals Manchester United, then playing in the Second Division.

In the 1932–33 season he was United's top scorer with eleven goals. He would go on to score league 14 goals for United in 42 matches before retiring due to injury in 1934 (aged 23), although he subsequently had brief spells at Northampton Town in 1934, Tranmere Rovers and Oldham Athletic in 1935.

== Managerial career ==
=== Tranmere Rovers ===
In 1942, Ridding was appointed manager of Tranmere Rovers. However, due to the Second World War he only took charge of twenty matches in his four-year spell as manager.

=== Bolton Wanderers ===
Ridding replaced Walter Rowley, who resigned due to ill health, in October 1950 as manager of Bolton Wanderers. The 1950–51 season saw a significant improvement in Bolton's league performance, finishing eighth, six places higher than the previous season. The following season 1951–52 they finished three places higher in fifth. An FA Cup Final appearance followed a year later; however they lost a thrilling encounter against a Stanley Matthews inspired Blackpool team 4–3. Another fifth-place finish came in the 1953–54 league season as well as a run to the quarter-finals of the cup. The 1954–55 season saw Bolton struggle for form in the league, narrowly escaping relegation, finishing the season in eighteenth place. Bill Ridding's men bounced back the following season to finish in a respectful eighth position, following that up with a ninth place in 1956–57.

The 1957–58 season saw Bolton win their fourth and, to date, last FA Cup with a victory over a post Munich Manchester United. Nat Lofthouse scored twice in a 2–0 win. The team that won the cup had cost just £110 in signing-on fees.

The FA Cup victory inspired Bolton in the league as they embarked on their finest league performance in 33 years, finishing the 1958–59 season in fourth position. The 1959–60 season saw Bolton finish sixth, a position it would take another forty five years to replicate. A slow and gradual demise in Bolton's fortunes started from here, linked somewhat to Lofthouse's retirement and respective finishes of eighteenth, eleventh and eighteenth foreshadowed what was to come. Ridding also missed out on signing Alan Ball, who joined Bolton on a trial in 1961. Ridding rejected Ball on the grounds that, at 5 ft 6 ins, he was too small to make the grade as a footballer, advising him that "You'll make a good little jockey!"

The 1963–64 season proved to be the nadir of Ridding's times at the club as a twenty first-place finish condemned Bolton to relegation, their first time out of the top flight since 1935. In the 1964–65 season Bolton narrowly missed out on promotion back to the top flight, finishing the season in third position. Positions became gradually worse, with Bolton finishing ninth, twice, and then twelfth, at the time the club's worst ever position. Ridding left Bolton just before the start of the next season and was replaced by Lofthouse.

== Honours ==
=== Manager ===
Bolton Wanderers

- FA Cup: 1957–58
- FA Charity Shield (1): 1958
