= Samuel Hopkinson (footballer) =

English footballer

Samuel Hopkinson (9 February 1903 – 9 May 1958) was an English footballer. His regular position was as a forward. He was born in Killamarsh, North East Derbyshire. He played for Shirebrook, Valley Road BC, Chesterfield, Ashton National, Manchester United and Tranmere Rovers.

He was 5 ft 7 1/2 in (1.71 m) tall.
