= Arthur Warburton =

English footballer

Arthur Warburton (10 September 1909 – 13 May 1972) was an English footballer. His regular position was as a forward. He was born in Bury, Greater Manchester. He played for Sedgley Park, Manchester United, Burnley, Nelson, Fulham and Queens Park Rangers, as well as guesting for several clubs during the Second World War. He was 5 ft 7 in (1.70 m) tall, and also played rugby.
