= Jack Mellor =

English footballer (born 1906)

Personal information
- Date of birth: July 1906
- Place of birth: Oldham, England
- Position: Full back

Senior career*
Years	Team	Apps	(Gls)
192x–1929	Witton Albion		
1929–1937	Manchester United	116	(0)
1937–1939	Cardiff City	28	(0)
- * Club domestic league appearances and goals

John Mellor (born July 1906, date of death unknown) was an English footballer who played as a full back in the Football League for Manchester United and Cardiff City. He was born in Oldham, Lancashire. In his early days, he played for Witton Albion. In June 1929, he was sold to Manchester United, where he made 122 appearances without scoring. He stayed with United until 1937 when he was sold to Cardiff City. He made his Cardiff debut in an 8–1 defeat of Luton Town and stayed for two seasons before being forced to retire from injury.
