= Jack Silcock =

English footballer (1898–1966)

Personal information
- Full name: John Silcock
- Date of birth: 15 January 1898
- Place of birth: Wigan, England
- Date of death: 28 June 1966 (aged 68)
- Height: 5 ft 10 in (1.78 m)
- Position: Left-back

Senior career*
Years	Team	Apps	(Gls)
1919–1934	Manchester United	423	(2)
1934–1935	Oldham Athletic	0	(0)
1936	Droylsden		

International career
1921–1923	England	3	(0)
- * Club domestic league appearances and goals

John Silcock (15 January 1898 – 28 June 1966) was an English footballer, who played at left-back, spending most of his career at Manchester United.

== Club career ==
As a youth, Silcock played for Aspull Juniors and Atherton, before signing for Manchester United as a trainee in 1916. He started his professional career with them in 1919. He made 423 appearances, scoring 2 goals for the club, before leaving in 1934 for Oldham Athletic, where he remained until retiring as a player. He briefly came out of retirement in 1936, to play for Droylsden.

== International career ==
Silcock won three caps for England between 1921 and 1923.

== Death ==
He died in 1966, at the age of 68.
