= Stanley Gallimore =

English footballer

Personal information
- Full name: Stanley Hugh Gallimore
- Date of birth: 14 April 1910
- Place of birth: Bucklow Hill, Cheshire, England
- Date of death: September 1994 (aged 95)
- Place of death: Northwich, Cheshire, England
- Position: Forward

Senior career*
Years	Team	Apps	(Gls)
1929-1930	Witton Albion		
1930-1934	Manchester United	72	(19)
1934-1938	Altrincham	159	(42)
1938	Northwich Victoria		
1938-1940	Altrincham	52	(17)
1945	Witton Albion		
- * Club domestic league appearances and goals

Stanley Hugh Gallimore (14 April 1910 – September 1994) was an English footballer. His regular position was as a forward. He was born in Bucklow Hill, Cheshire and died in the Trafford district of Cheshire. He played for Witton Albion, Manchester United, Altrincham and Northwich Victoria.

He joined Manchester United from Witton Albion in September 1929 and made his first team debut at West Ham United on 11 October 1930. He went on to make a total of 76 appearances scoring 20 goals of which 1 was scored in the 4 F.A. Cup ties he played in.
