= 1947–48 Manchester United F.C. season =

English football club season

Manchester United
1947–48 season
- Chairman: James W. Gibson
- Manager: Matt Busby
- Stadium: Maine Road
- First Division: 2nd
- FA Cup: Winners
- Top goalscorer: League: Jack Rowley (23); All: Jack Rowley (28)
- Highest home attendance: 81,962 vs Arsenal (17 January 1948)
- Lowest home attendance: 33,312 vs Charlton Athletic (7 February 1948)
- Average home league attendance: 54,484
Home colours	Away colours

The 1947–48 season was Manchester United's 46th season in the Football League and third back in the First Division since their promotion from the Second Division in 1938. They finished the season second in the league but most significantly won the FA Cup with a 4–2 win over Blackpool in their first appearance at Wembley Stadium, ending the club's 37-year wait for a major trophy.

== Pre-season and friendlies ==
Date	Opponents	H / A	Result F–A	Scorers	Attendance
12 May 1948	Bohemians Select XI	A	1–2	Mitten 32'	37,500
16 May 1948	Shelbourne Select XI	N	4–3	Buckle (2), Anderson, Leuty (o.g.)	25,000
19 May 1948	Linfield	A	3–2	Morris, Buckle, Rowley	30,000

== First Division ==
Date	Opponents	H / A	Result F–A	Scorers	Attendance	League position
23 August 1947	Middlesbrough	A	2–2	Rowley (2)	39,554	10th
27 August 1947	Liverpool	H	2–0	Morris, Pearson	52,385	4th
30 August 1947	Charlton Athletic	H	6–2	Rowley (4), Morris, Pearson	52,659	2nd
3 September 1947	Liverpool	A	2–2	Mitten, Pearson	48,081	4th
6 September 1947	Arsenal	A	1–2	Morris	64,905	6th
8 September 1947	Burnley	A	0–0		37,517	5th
13 September 1947	Sheffield United	H	0–1		49,808	8th
20 September 1947	Manchester City	A	0–0		71,364	12th
27 September 1947	Preston North End	A	1–2	Morris	34,372	14th
4 October 1947	Stoke City	H	1–1	Hanlon	45,745	14th
11 October 1947	Grimsby Town	H	3–4	Mitten, Morris, Rowley	40,035	17th
18 October 1947	Sunderland	A	0–1		37,148	18th
25 October 1947	Aston Villa	H	2–0	Delaney, Rowley	47,078	17th
1 November 1947	Wolverhampton Wanderers	A	6–2	Morris (2), Pearson (2), Delaney, Mitten	44,309	15th
8 November 1947	Huddersfield Town	H	4–4	Rowley (4)	59,772	15th
15 November 1947	Derby County	A	1–1	Carey	32,990	13th
22 November 1947	Everton	H	2–2	Cockburn, Morris	35,509	15th
29 November 1947	Chelsea	A	4–0	Morris (3), Rowley	43,617	11th
6 December 1947	Blackpool	H	1–1	Pearson	63,683	10th
13 December 1947	Blackburn Rovers	A	1–1	Morris	22,784	11th
20 December 1947	Middlesbrough	H	2–1	Pearson (2)	46,666	10th
25 December 1947	Portsmouth	H	3–2	Morris (2), Rowley	42,776	8th
27 December 1947	Portsmouth	A	3–1	Morris (2), Delaney	27,674	6th
1 January 1948	Burnley	H	5–0	Rowley (3), Mitten (2)	59,838	5th
3 January 1948	Charlton Athletic	A	2–1	Morris, Pearson	40,484	4th
17 January 1948	Arsenal	H	1–1	Rowley	81,962	5th
31 January 1948	Sheffield United	A	1–2	Rowley	45,189	5th
14 February 1948	Preston North End	H	1–1	Delaney	61,765	7th
21 February 1948	Stoke City	A	2–0	Buckle, Pearson	36,794	5th
6 March 1948	Sunderland	H	3–1	Delaney, Mitten, Rowley	55,160	4th
17 March 1948	Grimsby Town	A	1–1	Rowley	12,284	4th
20 March 1948	Wolverhampton Wanderers	H	3–2	Delaney, Mitten, Morris	50,667	4th
22 March 1948	Aston Villa	A	1–0	Pearson	52,368	3rd
26 March 1948	Bolton Wanderers	H	0–2		71,623	4th
27 March 1948	Huddersfield Town	A	2–0	Burke, Pearson	38,266	3rd
29 March 1948	Bolton Wanderers	A	1–0	Anderson	44,225	2nd
3 April 1948	Derby County	H	1–0	Pearson	49,609	2nd
7 April 1948	Manchester City	H	1–1	Rowley	71,690	2nd
10 April 1948	Everton	A	0–2		44,198	2nd
17 April 1948	Chelsea	H	5–0	Pearson (2), Delaney, Mitten, Rowley	43,225	2nd
28 April 1948	Blackpool	A	0–1		32,236	2nd
1 May 1948	Blackburn Rovers	H	4–1	Pearson (3), Delaney	44,439	2nd

Pos	Team	Pld	W	D	L	GF	GA	GAv	Pts	Relegation
1	Arsenal (C)	42	23	13	6	81	32	2.531	59	
2	Manchester United	42	19	14	9	81	48	1.688	52	
3	Burnley	42	20	12	10	56	43	1.302	52	
4	Derby County	42	19	12	11	77	57	1.351	50	
5	Wolverhampton Wanderers	42	19	9	14	83	70	1.186	47	
6	Aston Villa	42	19	9	14	65	57	1.140	47	
7	Preston North End	42	20	7	15	67	68	0.985	47	
8	Portsmouth	42	19	7	16	68	50	1.360	45	
9	Blackpool	42	17	10	15	57	41	1.390	44	
10	Manchester City	42	15	12	15	52	47	1.106	42	
11	Liverpool	42	16	10	16	65	61	1.066	42	
12	Sheffield United	42	16	10	16	65	70	0.929	42	
13	Charlton Athletic	42	17	6	19	57	66	0.864	40	
14	Everton	42	17	6	19	52	66	0.788	40	
15	Stoke City	42	14	10	18	41	55	0.745	38	
16	Middlesbrough	42	14	9	19	71	73	0.973	37	
17	Bolton Wanderers	42	16	5	21	46	58	0.793	37	
18	Chelsea	42	14	9	19	53	71	0.746	37	
19	Huddersfield Town	42	12	12	18	51	60	0.850	36	
20	Sunderland	42	13	10	19	56	67	0.836	36	
21	Blackburn Rovers (R)	42	11	10	21	54	72	0.750	32	Relegation to the Second Division
22	Grimsby Town (R)	42	8	6	28	45	111	0.405	22	Relegation to the Second Division

Source: World Football
Rules for classification: 1) Points; 2) Goal average; 3) Goals scored
(C) Champions; (R) Relegated

== FA Cup ==
Date	Round	Opponents	H / A	Result F–A	Scorers	Attendance
10 January 1948	Third Round	Aston Villa	A	6–4	Morris (2), Pearson (2), Delaney, Rowley	58,683
24 January 1948	Fourth Round	Liverpool	A (Note: Because Manchester United were sharing Maine Road with Manchester City at the time and City were also scheduled to play at home that day, the match was moved to Goodison Park in Liverpool.)	3–0	Mitten, Morris, Rowley	74,721
7 February 1948	Fifth Round	Charlton Athletic	H	2–0	Mitten, Warner	33,312
28 February 1948	Sixth Round	Preston North End	H	4–2	Pearson (2), Mitten, Rowley	74,213
13 March 1948	Semi-Final	Derby County	N	3–1	Pearson (3)	60,000
24 April 1948	Final	Blackpool	N	4–2	Rowley (2), Anderson, Pearson	99,000

== Squad statistics ==
Pos.	Name	League		FA Cup		Total	
Pos.	Name	Apps	Goals	Apps	Goals	Apps	Goals
GK	(England) Jack Crompton	37	0	6	0	43	0
GK	(England) Berry Brown	3	0	0	0	3	0
GK	(England) Jimmy Pegg	2	0	0	0	2	0
FB	(England) John Aston, Sr.	42	0	6	0	48	0
FB	(England) John Ball	1	0	0	0	1	0
FB	(Republic of Ireland) Johnny Carey	37	1	6	0	43	1
FB	(Scotland) Tommy Lowrie	2	0	0	0	2	0
FB	(England) Sammy Lynn	3	0	0	0	3	0
FB	(England) Joe Walton	6	0	0	0	6	0
FB	(England) Harry Worrall	5	0	0	0	5	0
HB	(England) Allenby Chilton	41	0	6	0	47	0
HB	(England) Henry Cockburn	26	1	6	0	32	1
HB	(England) Billy McGlen	13	0	0	0	13	0
HB	(Wales) Jack Warner	15	0	1	1	16	1
FW	(England) John Anderson	18	1	5	1	23	2
FW	(England) Ted Buckle	3	1	0	0	3	1
FW	(England) Ronnie Burke	6	1	0	0	6	1
FW	(England) Laurie Cassidy	1	0	0	0	1	0
FW	(England) Joe Dale	2	0	0	0	2	0
FW	(Scotland) Jimmy Delaney	36	8	6	1	42	9
FW	(England) Jimmy Hanlon	8	1	0	0	8	1
FW	(England) Charlie Mitten	38	8	6	3	44	11
FW	(England) Johnny Morris	38	18	6	3	44	21
FW	(England) Stan Pearson	40	18	6	8	46	26
FW	(England) Jack Rowley	39	23	6	5	45	28
–	Own goals	–	0	–	0	–	0
