= 1948–49 Manchester United F.C. season =

English football club season

Manchester United
1948–49 season
- Chairman: James W. Gibson
- Manager: Matt Busby
- Stadium: Maine Road
- First Division: 2nd
- FA Cup: Semi-final
- Charity Shield: Runners-up
- Top goalscorer: League: Jack Rowley (20); All: Jack Rowley (30)
- Highest home attendance: 82,771 vs Bradford Park Avenue (29 January 1949)
- Lowest home attendance: 20,158 vs Middlesbrough (2 May 1949)
- Average home league attendance: 50,427
Home colours	Away colours

The 1948–49 season was Manchester United's 47th season in the Football League. They finished second in the league and as FA Cup holders they reached the semi-finals.

== FA Charity Shield ==
Date	Opponents	H / A	Result F–A	Scorers	Attendance
6 October 1948	Arsenal	A	3–4	Rowley, Burke, own goal	31,000

== First Division ==
Date	Opponents	H / A	Result F–A	Scorers	Attendance
21 August 1948	Derby County	H	1–2	Pearson	52,620
23 August 1948	Blackpool	A	3–0	Rowley (2), Mitten	36,880
28 August 1948	Arsenal	A	1–0	Mitten	64,150
1 September 1948	Blackpool	H	3–4	Delaney, Mitten, Morris	51,187
4 September 1948	Huddersfield Town	H	4–1	Pearson (2), Delaney, Mitten	57,714
8 September 1948	Wolverhampton Wanderers	A	2–3	Morris, Rowley	42,617
11 September 1948	Manchester City	A	0–0		64,502
15 September 1948	Wolverhampton Wanderers	H	2–0	Buckle, Pearson	33,871
18 September 1948	Sheffield United	A	2–2	Buckle, Pearson	36,880
25 September 1948	Aston Villa	H	3–1	Mitten (2), Pearson	53,820
2 October 1948	Sunderland	A	1–2	Rowley	54,419
9 October 1948	Charlton Athletic	H	1–1	Burke	46,964
16 October 1948	Stoke City	A	1–2	Morris	45,830
23 October 1948	Burnley	H	1–1	Mitten	47,093
30 October 1948	Preston North End	A	6–1	Mitten (2), Pearson (2), Morris, Rowley	37,372
6 November 1948	Everton	H	2–0	Delaney, Morris	42,789
13 November 1948	Chelsea	A	1–1	Rowley	62,542
20 November 1948	Birmingham City	H	3–0	Morris, Pearson, Rowley	45,482
27 November 1948	Middlesbrough	A	4–1	Rowley (3), Delaney	31,331
4 December 1948	Newcastle United	H	1–1	Mitten	70,787
11 December 1948	Portsmouth	A	2–2	McGlen, Mitten	29,966
18 December 1948	Derby County	A	3–1	Burke (2), Mitten	31,498
25 December 1948	Liverpool	H	0–0		47,788
27 December 1948	Liverpool	A	2–0	Burke, Pearson	53,325
1 January 1949	Arsenal	H	2–0	Burke, Mitten	58,688
22 January 1949	Manchester City	H	0–0		66,485
19 February 1949	Aston Villa	A	1–2	Rowley	68,354
5 March 1949	Charlton Athletic	A	3–2	Pearson (2), Downie	55,291
12 March 1949	Stoke City	H	3–0	Downie, Mitten, Rowley	55,949
19 March 1949	Birmingham City	A	0–1		46,819
6 April 1949	Huddersfield Town	A	1–2	Rowley	17,256
9 April 1949	Chelsea	H	1–1	Mitten	27,304
15 April 1949	Bolton Wanderers	A	1–0	Carey	44,999
16 April 1949	Burnley	A	2–0	Rowley (2)	37,722
18 April 1949	Bolton Wanderers	H	3–0	Rowley (2), Mitten	47,653
21 April 1949	Sunderland	H	1–2	Mitten	30,640
23 April 1949	Preston North End	H	2–2	Downie (2)	43,214
27 April 1949	Everton	A	0–2		39,106
30 April 1949	Newcastle United	A	1–0	Burke	38,266
2 May 1949	Middlesbrough	H	1–0	Rowley	20,158
4 May 1949	Sheffield United	H	3–2	Downie, Mitten, Pearson	20,880
7 May 1949	Portsmouth	H	3–2	Rowley (2), Mitten	49,808

Pos	Team	Pld	W	D	L	GF	GA	GAv	Pts	Relegation
1	Portsmouth (C)	42	25	8	9	84	42	2.000	58	
2	Manchester United	42	21	11	10	77	44	1.750	53	
3	Derby County	42	22	9	11	74	55	1.345	53	
4	Newcastle United	42	20	12	10	70	56	1.250	52	
5	Arsenal	42	18	13	11	74	44	1.682	49	
6	Wolverhampton Wanderers	42	17	12	13	79	66	1.197	46	
7	Manchester City	42	15	15	12	47	51	0.922	45	
8	Sunderland	42	13	17	12	49	58	0.845	43	
9	Charlton Athletic	42	15	12	15	63	67	0.940	42	
10	Aston Villa	42	16	10	16	60	76	0.789	42	
11	Stoke City	42	16	9	17	66	68	0.971	41	
12	Liverpool	42	13	14	15	53	43	1.233	40	
13	Chelsea	42	12	14	16	69	68	1.015	38	
14	Bolton Wanderers	42	14	10	18	59	68	0.868	38	
15	Burnley	42	12	14	16	43	50	0.860	38	
16	Blackpool	42	11	16	15	54	67	0.806	38	
17	Birmingham City	42	11	15	16	36	38	0.947	37	
18	Everton	42	13	11	18	41	63	0.651	37	
19	Middlesbrough	42	11	12	19	46	57	0.807	34	
20	Huddersfield Town	42	12	10	20	40	69	0.580	34	
21	Preston North End (R)	42	11	11	20	62	75	0.827	33	Relegation to the Second Division
22	Sheffield United (R)	42	11	11	20	57	78	0.731	33	Relegation to the Second Division

Source: World Football
Rules for classification: 1) Points; 2) Goal average; 3) Goals scored
(C) Champions; (R) Relegated

== FA Cup ==
Date	Round	Opponents	H / A	Result F–A	Scorers	Attendance
8 January 1949	Round 3	Bournemouth & Boscombe AFC	H	6–0	Burke (2), Rowley (2), Pearson, Mitten	55,012
29 January 1949	Round 4	Bradford Park Avenue	H	1–1	Mitten	82,771
5 February 1949	Round 4 Replay	Bradford Park Avenue	A	1–1 (a.e.t.)	Mitten	30,000
7 February 1949	Round 4 Second Replay	Bradford Park Avenue	H	5–0	Burke (2), Rowley (2), Pearson	70,434
12 February 1949	Round 5	Yeovil Town	H	8–0	Rowley (5), Burke (2), Mitten	81,565
26 February 1949	Round 6	Hull City	A	1–0	Pearson	55,000
26 March 1949	Semi-final	Wolverhampton Wanderers	N	1–1 (a.e.t.)	Mitten	62,250
2 April 1949	Semi-final; Replay	Wolverhampton Wanderers	N	0–1		73,000

== Squad statistics ==
Pos.	Name	League		FA Cup		Charity Shield		Total	
Pos.	Name	Apps	Goals	Apps	Goals	Apps	Goals	Apps	Goals
GK	(England) Jack Crompton	41	0	8	0	1	0	50	0
GK	(England) Berry Brown	1	0	0	0	0	0	1	0
FB	(England) John Aston, Sr.	39	0	8	0	1	0	48	0
FB	(England) John Ball	9	0	1	0	0	0	10	0
FB	(Republic of Ireland) Johnny Carey	41	1	7	0	1	0	49	1
FB	(Scotland) Tommy Lowrie	8	0	0	0	0	0	8	0
HB	(England) Allenby Chilton	42	0	8	0	1	0	51	0
HB	(England) Henry Cockburn	36	0	8	0	0	0	44	0
HB	(England) Billy McGlen	23	1	8	0	0	0	31	1
HB	(Wales) Jack Warner	3	0	0	0	1	0	4	0
FW	(England) John Anderson	15	0	1	0	1	0	17	0
FW	(England) Ted Buckle	5	2	2	0	0	0	7	2
FW	(England) Ronnie Burke	9	6	6	6	1	1	16	13
FW	(England) Laurie Cassidy	1	0	0	0	0	0	1	0
FW	(Scotland) Jimmy Delaney	36	4	6	0	1	0	43	4
FW	(Scotland) John Downie	12	5	0	0	0	0	12	5
FW	(England) Charlie Mitten	42	18	8	5	1	0	51	23
FW	(England) Johnny Morris	21	6	1	0	1	0	23	6
FW	(England) Stan Pearson	39	14	8	3	0	0	47	17
FW	(England) Jack Rowley	39	20	8	9	1	1	48	30
–	Own goals	–	0	–	0	–	1	–	1
