= 1946–47 Manchester United F.C. season =

English football club season

Manchester United
1946–47 season
- Chairman: James W. Gibson
- Manager: Matt Busby
- Stadium: Maine Road
- First Division: 2nd
- FA Cup: Fourth Round
- Top goalscorer: League: Jack Rowley (26); All: Jack Rowley (28)
- Highest home attendance: 65,112 vs Middlesbrough (14 September 1946)
- Lowest home attendance: 8,456 vs Stoke City (5 February 1947)
- Average home league attendance: 43,327
Home colours	Away colours

The 1946–47 season was Manchester United's 45th season in the Football League and second back in the First Division since their promotion from the Second Division in 1938. It was the first season of Football League action following the end of World War II, and the club's first in the league under the management of Matt Busby. United failed to end their wait for a major trophy which began in 1911, but they had their best season since then, finishing runners-up in the First Division behind Liverpool.

== First Division ==
Date	Opponents	H / A	Result F–A	Scorers	Attendance
31 August 1946	Grimsby Town	H	2–1	Mitten, Rowley	41,025
4 September 1946	Chelsea	A	3–0	Mitten, Pearson, Rowley	27,750
7 September 1946	Charlton Athletic	A	3–1	Hanlon, Rowley, own goal	44,088
11 September 1946	Liverpool	H	5–0	Pearson (3), Mitten, Rowley	41,657
14 September 1946	Middlesbrough	H	1–0	Rowley	65,112
18 September 1946	Chelsea	H	1–1	Chilton	30,275
21 September 1946	Stoke City	A	2–3	Delaney, Hanlon	41,699
28 September 1946	Arsenal	H	5–2	Hanlon (2), Rowley (2), Wrigglesworth	62,718
5 October 1946	Preston North End	H	1–1	Wrigglesworth	55,395
12 October 1946	Sheffield United	A	2–2	Rowley (2)	35,543
19 October 1946	Blackpool	A	1–3	Delaney	26,307
26 October 1946	Sunderland	H	0–3		48,385
2 November 1946	Aston Villa	A	0–0		53,668
9 November 1946	Derby County	H	4–1	Pearson (2), Mitten, Rowley	57,340
16 November 1946	Everton	A	2–2	Pearson, Rowley	45,832
23 November 1946	Huddersfield Town	H	5–2	Mitten (2), Morris (2), Rowley	39,216
30 November 1946	Wolverhampton Wanderers	A	2–3	Hanlon, Delaney	46,704
7 December 1946	Brentford	H	4–1	Rowley (3), Mitten	31,962
14 December 1946	Blackburn Rovers	A	1–2	Morris	21,455
25 December 1946	Bolton Wanderers	A	2–2	Rowley (2)	28,505
26 December 1946	Bolton Wanderers	H	1–0	Pearson	57,186
28 December 1946	Grimsby Town	A	0–0		17,183
4 January 1947	Charlton Athletic	H	4–1	Burke (2), Buckle, Pearson	43,406
18 January 1947	Middlesbrough	A	4–2	Pearson (2), Buckle, Morris	37,435
1 February 1947	Arsenal	A	2–6	Morris, Pearson	29,415
5 February 1947	Stoke City	H	1–1	Buckle	8,456
22 February 1947	Blackpool	H	3–0	Rowley (2), Hanlon	29,993
1 March 1947	Sunderland	A	1–1	Delaney	25,038
8 March 1947	Aston Villa	H	2–1	Burke, Pearson	36,965
15 March 1947	Derby County	A	3–4	Burke (2), Pearson	19,579
22 March 1947	Everton	H	3–0	Burke, Delaney, Warner	43,441
29 March 1947	Huddersfield Town	A	2–2	Delaney, Pearson	18,509
5 April 1947	Wolverhampton Wanderers	H	3–1	Rowley (2), Hanlon	66,967
7 April 1947	Leeds United	H	3–1	Burke (2), Hanlon	41,772
8 April 1947	Leeds United	A	2–0	Burke, McGlen	15,528
12 April 1947	Brentford	A	0–0		21,714
19 April 1947	Blackburn Rovers	H	4–0	Pearson (2), Rowley, own goal	46,196
26 April 1947	Portsmouth	A	1–0	Delaney	30,623
3 May 1947	Liverpool	A	0–1		48,800
10 May 1947	Preston North End	A	1–1	Pearson	23,278
17 May 1947	Portsmouth	H	3–0	Mitten, Morris, Rowley	37,614
26 May 1947	Sheffield United	H	6–2	Rowley (3), Morris (2), Pearson	34,059

Pos	Team	Pld	W	D	L	GF	GA	GAv	Pts
1	Liverpool (C)	42	25	7	10	84	52	1.615	57
2	Manchester United	42	22	12	8	95	54	1.759	56
3	Wolverhampton Wanderers	42	25	6	11	98	56	1.750	56
4	Stoke City	42	24	7	11	90	53	1.698	55
5	Blackpool	42	22	6	14	71	70	1.014	50

Source: World Football
Rules for classification: 1) Points; 2) Goal average; 3) Goals scored
(C) Champions

== FA Cup ==
Date	Round	Opponents	H / A	Result F–A	Scorers	Attendance
11 January 1947	Round 3	Bradford Park Avenue	A	3–0	Rowley (2), Buckle	26,990
25 January 1947	Round 4	Nottingham Forest	H	0–2		34,059

== Squad statistics ==
Pos.	Name	League		FA Cup		Total	
Pos.	Name	Apps	Goals	Apps	Goals	Apps	Goals
GK	(England) Cliff Collinson	7	0	0	0	7	0
GK	(England) Jack Crompton	29	0	1	0	30	0
GK	(England) Bill Fielding	6	0	1	0	7	0
FB	(England) John Aston, Sr.	21	0	2	0	23	0
FB	(Republic of Ireland) Johnny Carey	31	0	2	0	33	0
FB	(England) Joe Walton	15	0	0	0	15	0
FB	(England) Harry Worrall	1	0	0	0	1	0
HB	(England) Allenby Chilton	41	1	2	0	43	1
HB	(England) Henry Cockburn	32	0	0	0	32	0
HB	(England) Billy McGlen	33	1	2	0	35	1
HB	(Wales) Jack Warner	34	1	2	0	36	1
HB	(England) Bert Whalley	3	0	0	0	3	0
FW	(England) Ted Buckle	5	3	2	1	7	4
FW	(England) Ronnie Burke	13	9	0	0	13	9
FW	(Scotland) Jimmy Delaney	37	8	2	0	39	8
FW	(England) Jimmy Hanlon	27	7	0	0	27	7
FW	(England) Charlie Mitten	20	8	0	0	20	8
FW	(England) Johnny Morris	24	8	2	0	26	8
FW	(England) Stan Pearson	42	19	2	0	44	19
FW	(England) Jack Rowley	37	26	2	2	39	28
FW	(England) Billy Wrigglesworth	4	2	0	0	4	2
–	Own goals	–	2	–	0	–	2
