= 1949–50 Manchester United F.C. season =

English football club season

Manchester United
1949–50 season
- Chairman: James W. Gibson
- Manager: Matt Busby
- Stadium: Old Trafford
- First Division: 4th
- FA Cup: Sixth round
- Top goalscorer: League: Jack Rowley (20); All: Jack Rowley (23)
- Highest home attendance: 53,928 vs Arsenal (26 December 1949)
- Lowest home attendance: 11,968 vs Fulham (29 April 1950)
- Average home league attendance: 42,064
Home colours	Away colours

The 1949–50 season was Manchester United's 48th season in the Football League. They finished fourth in the First Division and reached the sixth round proper of the FA Cup.

A notable acquisition by the club during this season was 18-year-old goalkeeper Ray Wood, who was signed from Darlington as manager Matt Busby looked to find a younger goalkeeper to provide competition for Jack Crompton and Reg Allen for the 1950s.

== First Division ==
Date	Opponents	H / A	Result F – A	Scorers	Attendance
20 August 1949	Derby County	A	1–0	Rowley	35,687
24 August 1949	Bolton Wanderers	H	3–0	Mitten, Rowley, own goal	41,748
27 August 1949	West Bromwich Albion	H	1–1	Pearson	44,655
31 August 1949	Bolton Wanderers	A	2–1	Mitten, Pearson	36,277
3 September 1949	Manchester City	H	2–1	Pearson (2)	47,760
7 September 1949	Liverpool	A	1–1	Mitten	51,587
10 September 1949	Chelsea	A	1–1	Rowley	61,357
17 September 1949	Stoke City	H	2–2	Rowley (2)	43,522
24 September 1949	Burnley	A	0–1		41,072
1 October 1949	Sunderland	H	1–3	Pearson	49,260
8 October 1949	Charlton Athletic	H	3–2	Mitten (2), Rowley	43,809
15 October 1949	Aston Villa	A	4–0	Mitten (2), Bogan, Rowley	47,483
22 October 1949	Wolverhampton Wanderers	H	3–0	Pearson (2), Bogan	51,427
29 October 1949	Portsmouth	A	0–0		41,098
5 November 1949	Huddersfield Town	H	6–0	Pearson (2), Rowley (2), Delaney, Mitten	40,295
12 November 1949	Everton	A	0–0		46,672
19 November 1949	Middlesbrough	H	2–0	Pearson, Rowley	42,626
26 November 1949	Blackpool	A	3–3	Pearson (2), Bogan	27,742
3 December 1949	Newcastle United	H	1–1	Mitten	30,343
10 December 1949	Fulham	A	0–1		35,362
17 December 1949	Derby County	H	0–1		33,753
24 December 1949	West Bromwich Albion	A	2–1	Bogan, Rowley	46,973
26 December 1949	Arsenal	H	2–0	Pearson (2)	53,928
27 December 1949	Arsenal	A	0–0		65,133
31 December 1949	Manchester City	A	2–1	Delaney, Pearson	63,704
14 January 1950	Chelsea	H	1–0	Mitten	46,954
21 January 1950	Stoke City	A	1–3	Mitten	38,877
4 February 1950	Burnley	H	3–2	Rowley (2), Mitten	46,702
18 February 1950	Sunderland	A	2–2	Chilton, Rowley	63,251
25 February 1950	Charlton Athletic	A	2–1	Carey, Rowley	44,920
8 March 1950	Aston Villa	H	7–0	Mitten (4), Downie (2), Rowley	22,149
11 March 1950	Middlesbrough	A	3–2	Downie (2), Rowley	46,702
15 March 1950	Liverpool	H	0–0		43,456
18 March 1950	Blackpool	H	1–2	Delaney	53,688
25 March 1950	Huddersfield Town	A	1–3	Downie	34,348
1 April 1950	Everton	H	1–1	Delaney	35,381
7 April 1950	Birmingham City	H	0–2		47,170
8 April 1950	Wolverhampton Wanderers	A	1–1	Rowley	54,296
10 April 1950	Birmingham City	A	0–0		35,863
15 April 1950	Portsmouth	H	0–2		44,908
22 April 1950	Newcastle United	A	1–2	Downie	52,203
29 April 1950	Fulham	H	3–0	Rowley (2), Cockburn	11,968

Pos	Team	Pld	W	D	L	GF	GA	GAv	Pts	Relegation
1	Portsmouth (C)	42	22	9	11	74	38	1.947	53	
2	Wolverhampton Wanderers	42	20	13	9	76	49	1.551	53	
3	Sunderland	42	21	10	11	83	62	1.339	52	
4	Manchester United	42	18	14	10	69	44	1.568	50	
5	Newcastle United	42	19	12	11	77	55	1.400	50	
6	Arsenal	42	19	11	12	79	55	1.436	49	
7	Blackpool	42	17	15	10	46	35	1.314	49	
8	Liverpool	42	17	14	11	64	54	1.185	48	
9	Middlesbrough	42	20	7	15	59	48	1.229	47	
10	Burnley	42	16	13	13	40	40	1.000	45	
11	Derby County	42	17	10	15	69	61	1.131	44	
12	Aston Villa	42	15	12	15	61	61	1.000	42	
13	Chelsea	42	12	16	14	58	65	0.892	40	
14	West Bromwich Albion	42	14	12	16	47	53	0.887	40	
15	Huddersfield Town	42	14	9	19	52	73	0.712	37	
16	Bolton Wanderers	42	10	14	18	45	59	0.763	34	
17	Fulham	42	10	14	18	41	54	0.759	34	
18	Everton	42	10	14	18	42	66	0.636	34	
19	Stoke City	42	11	12	19	45	75	0.600	34	
20	Charlton Athletic	42	13	6	23	53	65	0.815	32	
21	Manchester City (R)	42	8	13	21	36	68	0.529	29	Relegation to the Second Division
22	Birmingham City (R)	42	7	14	21	31	67	0.463	28	Relegation to the Second Division

Source: World Football
Rules for classification: 1) Points; 2) Goal average; 3) Goals scored
(C) Champions; (R) Relegated

== FA Cup ==
Date	Round	Opponents	H / A	Result F – A	Scorers	Attendance
7 January 1950	Round 3	Weymouth	H	4–0	Rowley (2), Delaney, Pearson	38,284
28 January 1950	Round 4	Watford	A	1–0	Rowley	32,800
11 February 1950	Round 5	Portsmouth	H	3–3	Mitten (2), Pearson	53,688
15 February 1950	Round 5 replay	Portsmouth	A	3–1	Delaney, Downie, Mitten	49,962
4 March 1950	Round 6	Chelsea	A	0–2		70,362

== Squad statistics ==
Pos.	Name	League		FA Cup		Total	
Pos.	Name	Apps	Goals	Apps	Goals	Apps	Goals
GK	(England) Jack Crompton	27	0	1	0	28	0
GK	(Republic of Ireland) Sonny Feehan	12	0	2	0	14	0
GK	(England) Joe Lancaster	2	0	2	0	4	0
GK	(England) Ray Wood	1	0	0	0	1	0
FB	(England) John Aston, Sr.	40	0	5	0	45	0
FB	(England) John Ball	13	0	0	0	13	0
FB	(Republic of Ireland) Johnny Carey	38	1	5	0	43	1
FB	(Scotland) Tommy Lowrie	3	0	0	0	3	0
FB	(England) Sammy Lynn	10	0	0	0	10	0
FB	(England) Thomas McNulty	2	0	0	0	2	0
HB	(England) Allenby Chilton	35	1	5	0	40	1
HB	(England) Henry Cockburn	35	1	5	0	40	1
HB	(England) Billy McGlen	13	0	1	0	14	0
HB	(Wales) Jack Warner	21	0	4	0	25	0
HB	(England) Jeff Whitefoot	1	0	0	0	1	0
FW	(England) Brian Birch	1	0	0	0	1	0
FW	(Scotland) Tommy Bogan	18	4	4	0	22	4
FW	(England) Ted Buckle	7	0	0	0	7	0
FW	(England) Frank Clempson	1	0	0	0	1	0
FW	(Scotland) Jimmy Delaney	42	4	5	2	47	6
FW	(Scotland) John Downie	18	6	2	1	20	7
FW	(England) Charlie Mitten	42	16	5	3	47	19
FW	(England) Stan Pearson	41	15	4	2	45	17
FW	(England) Jack Rowley	39	20	5	3	44	23
–	Own goals	–	1	–	0	–	1
