= List of Manchester United F.C. records and statistics =

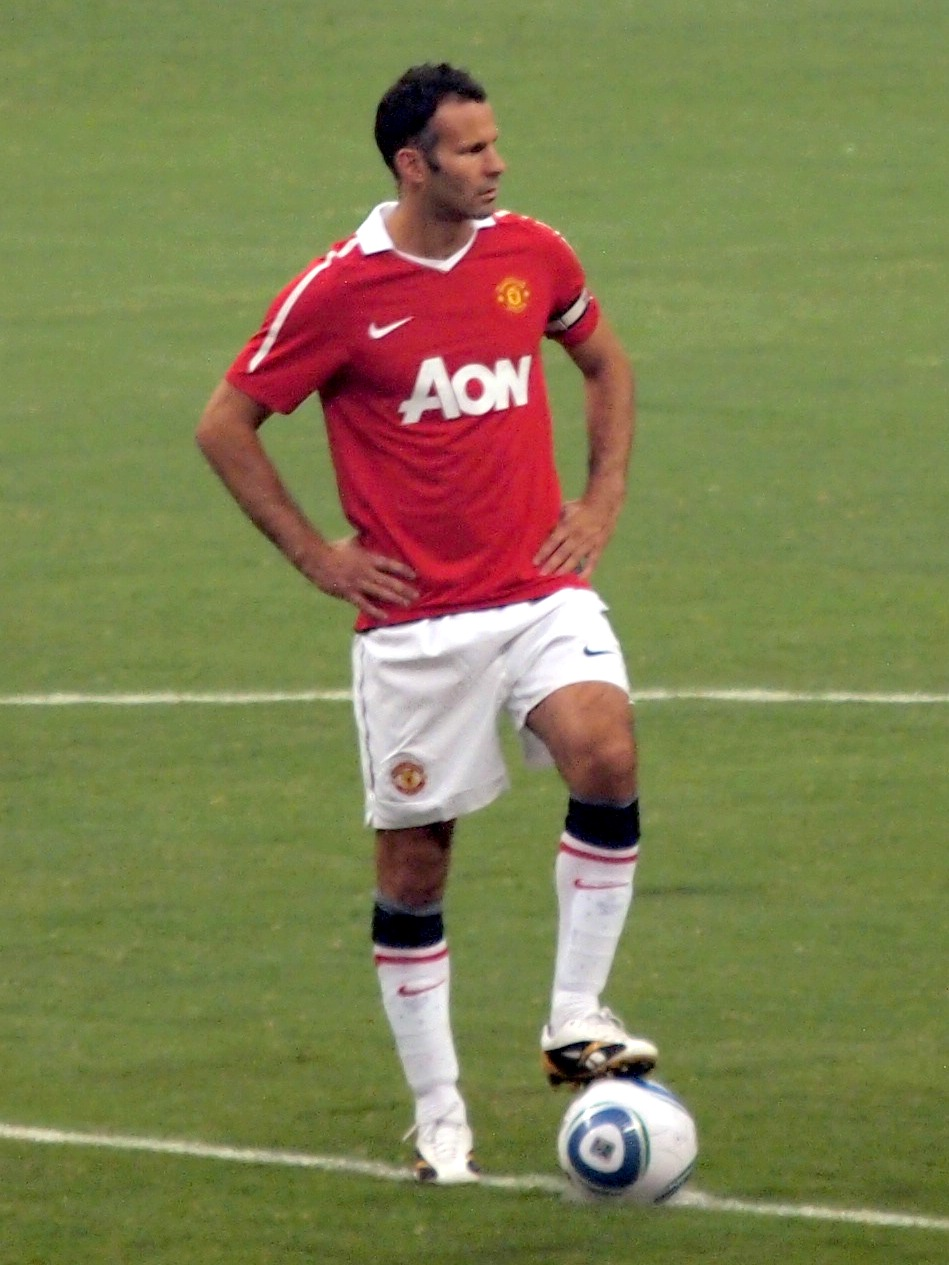
Ryan Giggs, Manchester United's record appearance maker

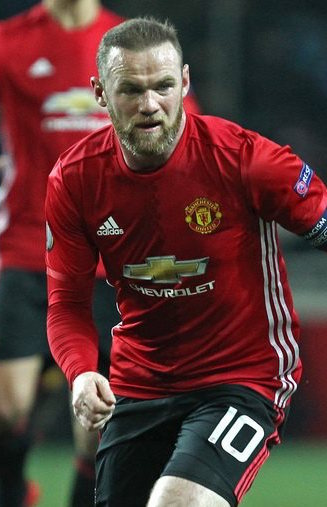
Wayne Rooney, Manchester United's record goalscorer

Manchester United Football Club is an English professional football club based in Old Trafford, Greater Manchester. The club was founded as Newton Heath LYR F.C. in 1878 and turned professional in 1885, before joining the Football League in 1892. After a brush with bankruptcy in 1901, the club reformed as Manchester United in 1902. Manchester United currently play in the Premier League, the top tier of English football. They have not been out of the top tier since 1975, and they have never been lower than the second tier. They have also been involved in European football ever since they became the first English club to enter the European Cup in 1956.

This list encompasses the major honours won by Manchester United and records set by the club, their managers and their players. The player records section includes details of the club's leading goalscorers and those who have made most appearances in first-team competitions. It also records notable achievements by Manchester United players on the international stage, and the highest transfer fees paid and received by the club. The club's attendance records, both at Old Trafford, their home since 1910, and Maine Road, their temporary home from 1946 to 1949, are also included in the list.

The club currently holds the record for the most Premier League titles with 13, and the highest number of English top-flight titles with 20. The club's record appearance maker is Ryan Giggs, who made 963 appearances between 1991 and 2014, and the club's record goalscorer is Wayne Rooney, who scored 253 goals in 559 appearances between 2004 and 2017.

== Honours ==
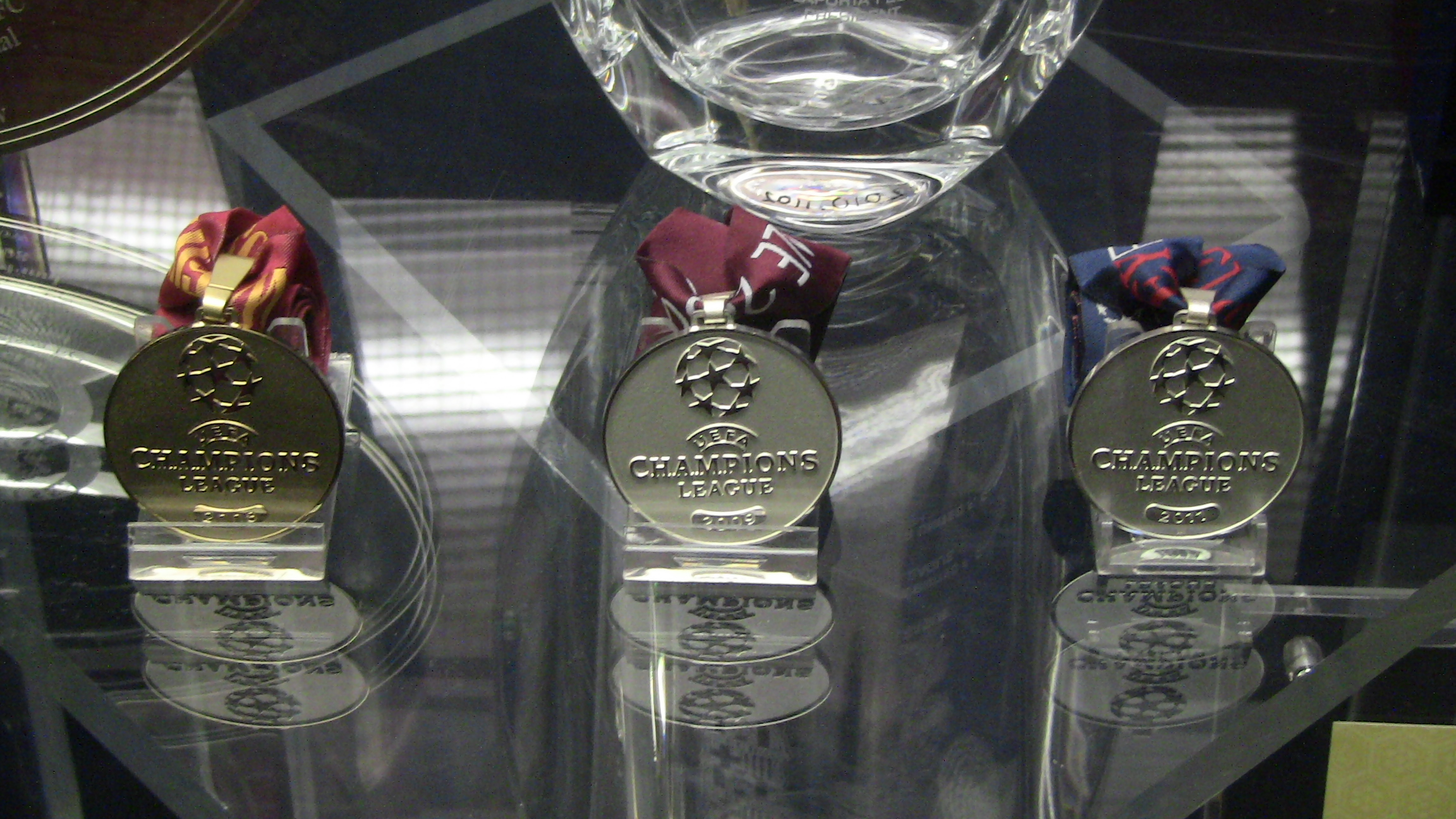
Winners' and runners-up medals from Manchester United's UEFA Champions League final appearances in 2008, 2009 and 2011

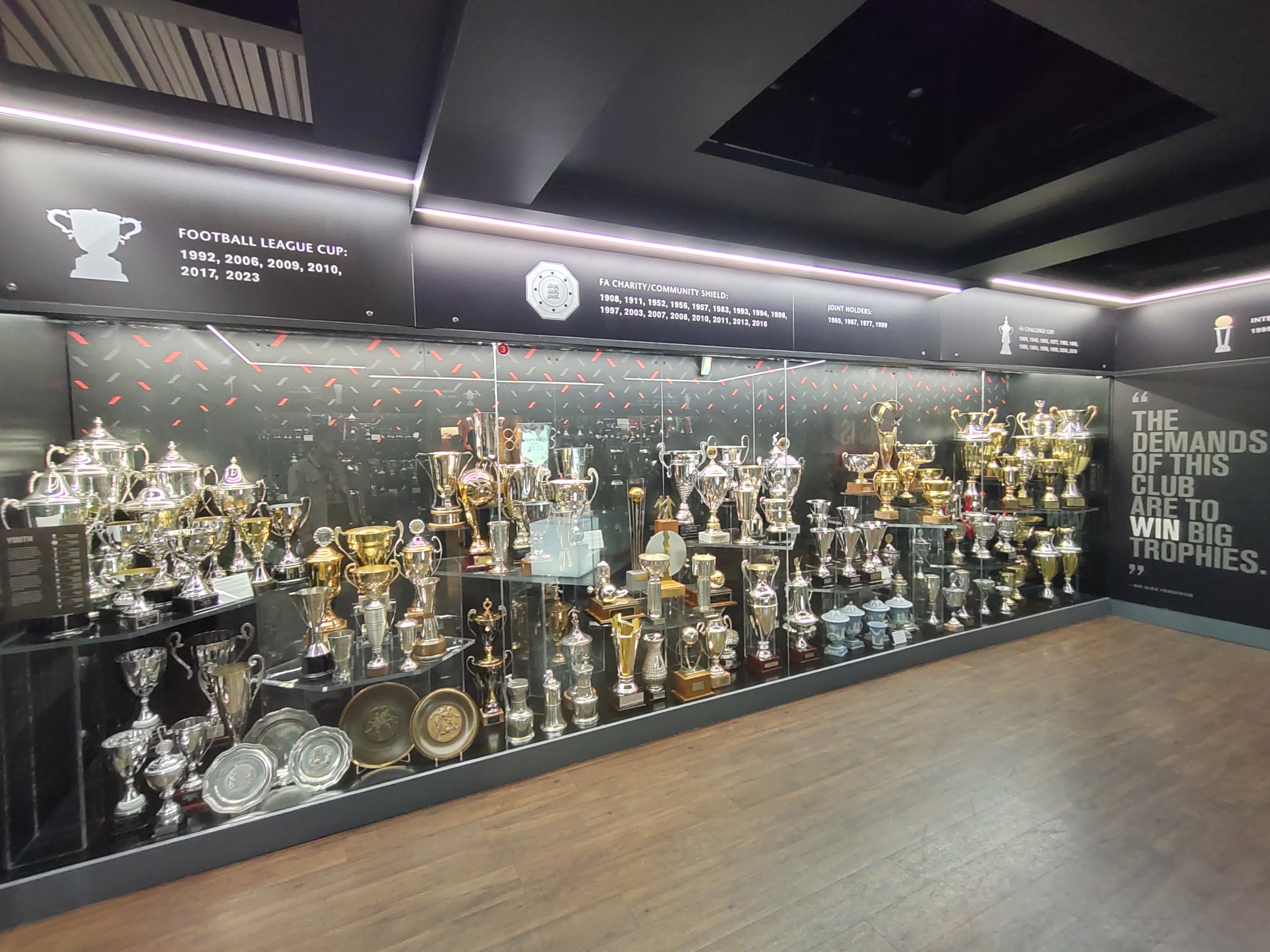
Trophy cabinet of United on display in the Old Trafford museum

Manchester United's first trophy was the Manchester Cup, which they won as Newton Heath LYR in 1886. Their first national senior honour came in 1908, when they won the 1907–08 Football League First Division title. The club won the FA Cup for the first time the following year. In terms of trophies won, the 1990s were Manchester United's most successful decade, during which time they won five league titles, four FA Cups, one League Cup, five Charity Shields (one shared)^{[A]}, one Champions League, one Cup Winners' Cup, one Super Cup and one Intercontinental Cup.

The club currently holds the record for most top-division titles, with 20. They were also the first team to win the Premier League, and hold the record for the most Premier League titles with 13. Manchester United became the first English team to win the European Cup when they won it in 1968. The club's most recent trophy came in May 2024, when they won the FA Cup.

=== Domestic ===
==== League ====
- First Division / Premier League (Level 1)^{[B]}: 20 – shared
  - 1907–08, 1910–11, 1951–52, 1955–56, 1956–57, 1964–65, 1966–67, 1992–93, 1993–94, 1995–96, 1996–97, 1998–99, 1999–2000, 2000–01, 2002–03, 2006–07, 2007–08, 2008–09, 2010–11, 2012–13
- Second Division (Level 2)^{[B]}: 2
  - 1935–36, 1974–75

==== Cups ====
- FA Cup: 13
  - 1908–09, 1947–48, 1962–63, 1976–77, 1982–83, 1984–85, 1989–90, 1993–94, 1995–96, 1998–99, 2003–04, 2015–16, 2023–24
- League/EFL Cup: 6
  - 1991–92, 2005–06, 2008–09, 2009–10, 2016–17, 2022–23
- FA Charity/Community Shield^{[A]}: 21 (17 outright, 4 shared) – record
  - 1908, 1911, 1952, 1956, 1957, 1965*, 1967*, 1977*, 1983, 1990*, 1993, 1994, 1996, 1997, 2003, 2007, 2008, 2010, 2011, 2013, 2016 (* joint holders)

=== European ===
- European Cup / UEFA Champions League: 3
  - 1967–68, 1998–99, 2007–08
- European Cup Winners' Cup: 1
  - 1990–91
- UEFA Europa League: 1
  - 2016–17
- European Super Cup: 1
  - 1991

=== Worldwide ===
- Intercontinental Cup: 1
  - 1999
- FIFA Club World Cup: 1
  - 2008

=== Regional ===
- Manchester Senior Cup: 23
  - 1886, 1888, 1889, 1890, 1893, 1902, 1908, 1910, 1912, 1913, 1920, 1924, 1926, 1931, 1934, 1936, 1937, 1939, 1948, 1955, 1957, 1959, 1964

=== Awards ===
- Laureus World Team of the Year
  - Winner: 2000
- IFFHS World Club Team of the Year
  - Winner: 1999, 2008
- PFA Merit Award
  - Winner: 1993, 2013
- BBC Sports Team of the Year Award
  - Winner: 1968, 1999

== Players ==
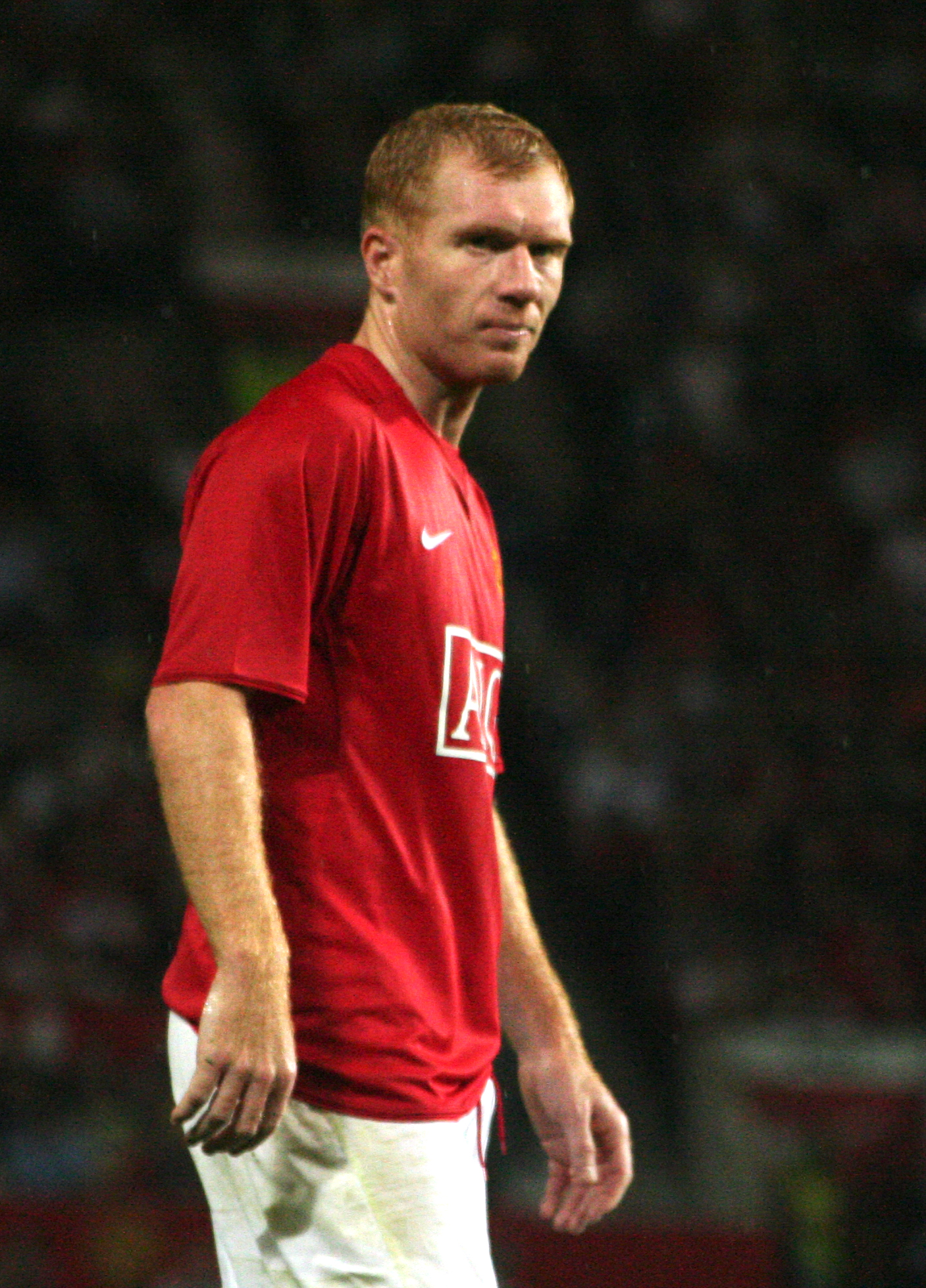
Paul Scholes has made the third-highest number of appearances for Manchester United.

All current players are in bold
All stats accurate as of match played 3 June 2023

=== Appearances ===
- Youngest first-team player: David Gaskell – 16 years, 19 days (against Manchester City, Charity Shield, 24 October 1956)
- Oldest first-team player: Billy Meredith – 46 years, 281 days (against Derby County, First Division, 7 May 1921)
- Oldest post-Second World War player: Edwin van der Sar – 40 years, 211 days (against Barcelona, UEFA Champions League, 28 May 2011)
- Most consecutive League appearances: **206** – Steve Coppell, 15 January 1977 – 7 November 1981
- Shortest appearance: **2 seconds** – Nick Culkin v Arsenal, Premier League, 22 August 1999

==== Most appearances ====
Competitive, professional matches only. Appearances as substitute (in parentheses) included in total.

Rank	Player	Years	League	FA Cup	League Cup	Europe	Other^{[C]}	Total
1	(Wales) Ryan Giggs	1991–2014	672 (117)	74 (12)	41 (6)	157 (23)	19 (3)	**963** (161)
2	(England) Bobby Charlton	1956–1973	606 (2)	78 (0)	24 (0)	45 (0)	5 (0)	**758** (2)
3	(England) Paul Scholes	1994–2011; 2012–2013	499 (95)	49 (17)	21 (7)	134 (21)	15 (1)	**718** (141)
4	(England) Bill Foulkes	1952–1970	566 (3)	61 (0)	3 (0)	52 (0)	6 (0)	**688** (3)
5	(England) Gary Neville	1992–2011	400 (21)	47 (3)	25 (2)	117 (8)	13 (2)	**602** (36)
6	(England) Wayne Rooney	2004–2017	393 (39)	40 (7)	20 (7)	98 (8)	8 (1)	**559** (62)
7	(Spain) David de Gea	2011–2023	415 (0)	28 (0)	16 (0)	82 (0)	4 (0)	**545** (0)
8	(England) Alex Stepney	1966–1978	433 (0)	44 (0)	35 (0)	23 (0)	4 (0)	**539** (0)
9	(Republic of Ireland) Tony Dunne	1960–1973	414 (0)	55 (1)	21 (0)	40 (0)	5 (0)	**535** (1)
10	(Republic of Ireland) Denis Irwin	1990–2002	368 (12)	43 (1)	31 (3)	75 (2)	12 (0)	**529** (18)
11	(England) Joe Spence	1919–1933	481 (0)	29 (0)	0 (0)	0 (0)	0 (0)	**510** (0)
12	(Scotland) Arthur Albiston	1974–1988	379 (16)	36 (0)	40 (1)	27 (1)	0 (0)	**485** (18)
13	(Republic of Ireland) Roy Keane	1993–2005	326 (17)	46 (2)	14 (2)	83 (1)	11 (0)	**480** (22)
14	(Scotland) Brian McClair	1987–1998	355 (59)	45 (7)	45 (1)	24 (6)	2 (0)	**471** (73)
15	(Northern Ireland) George Best	1963–1974	361 (0)	46 (0)	25 (0)	34 (0)	4 (0)	**470** (0)

=== Goalscorers ===
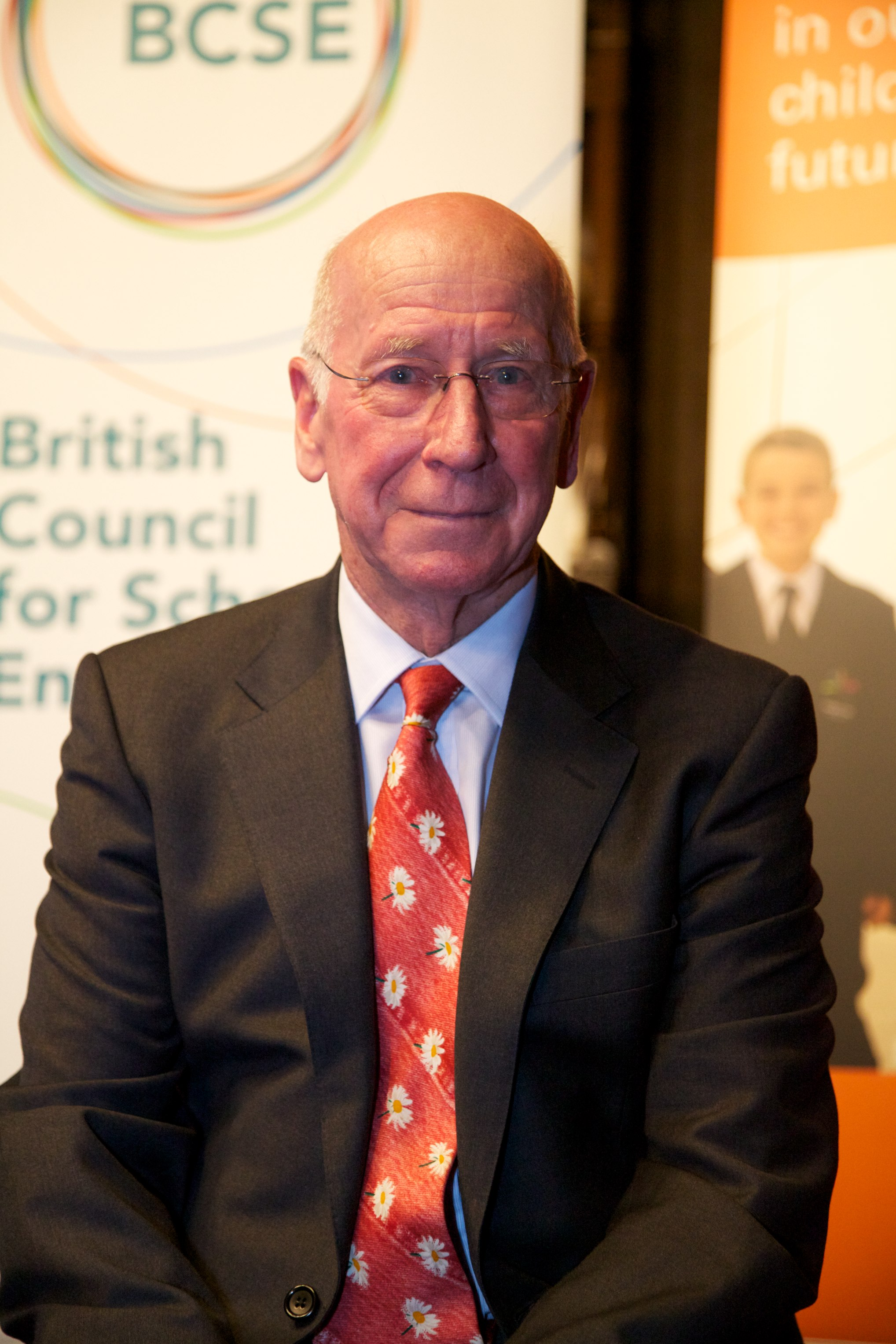
Bobby Charlton was Manchester United's all-time highest goalscorer until 2017, when his total of 249 goals was surpassed by club captain Wayne Rooney.

- Most goals in a season in all competitions: **46** – Denis Law, 1963–64
- Most League goals in a season: **32** – Dennis Viollet, Division 1, 1959–60
- Most League goals in a 38-game season: **31** – Cristiano Ronaldo, Premier League, 2007–08
- Top League scorer with fewest goals in a season: **6**
  - Bobby Charlton, 1972–73
  - Sammy McIlroy, 1973–74
- Most goals scored in a match: **6**
  - Harold Halse v Swindon Town, 25 September 1911
  - George Best v Northampton Town, 7 February 1970
- Goals in consecutive league matches: **10** consecutive matches – Ruud van Nistelrooy, 22 March 2003 to 23 August 2003
- Fastest goal: **12 seconds** – Bryan Robson v Burnley, League Cup, 26 September 1984
- Fastest hat-trick: **4 minutes** – Ernie Goldthorpe v Notts County, Second Division, 10 February 1923
- Fastest four goals: **13 minutes** – Ole Gunnar Solskjær v Nottingham Forest, Premier League, 6 February 1999
- Most hat-tricks: **18** – Denis Law (3 November 1962 – 17 April 1971)

==== Overall scorers ====
Competitive, professional matches only, appearances including substitutes appear in brackets.

Rank	Player	Years	League	FA Cup	League Cup	Europe	Other^{[C]}	Total	Goals per game
1	(England) Wayne Rooney	2004–2017	183 (393)	22 (40)	5 (20)	39 (98)	4 (8)	**253** (559)	0.452
2	(England) Bobby Charlton	1956–1973	199 (606)	19 (78)	7 (24)	22 (45)	2 (5)	**249** (758)	0.328
3	(Scotland) Denis Law	1962–1973	171 (309)	34 (46)	3 (11)	28 (33)	1 (5)	**237** (404)	0.587
4	(England) Jack Rowley	1937–1955	182 (380)	26 (42)	0 (0)	0 (0)	3 (2)	**211** (424)	0.498
5	(England) Dennis Viollet	1952–1962	159 (259)	5 (18)	1 (2)	13 (12)	1 (2)	**179** (293)	0.611
5	(Northern Ireland) George Best	1963–1974	137 (361)	21 (46)	9 (25)	11 (34)	1 (4)	**179** (470)	0.381
7	(England) Joe Spence	1919–1933	158 (481)	10 (29)	0 (0)	0 (0)	0 (0)	**168** (510)	0.329
7	(Wales) Ryan Giggs	1991–2014	114 (672)	12 (74)	12 (41)	29 (157)	1 (19)	**168** (963)	0.174
9	(Wales) Mark Hughes	1983–1986; 1988–1995	120 (345)	17 (46)	16 (38)	9 (33)	1 (5)	**163** (467)	0.349
10	(England) Paul Scholes	1994–2011; 2012–2013	107 (499)	13 (49)	9 (21)	26 (134)	0 (15)	**155** (718)	0.216
11	(Netherlands) Ruud van Nistelrooy	2001–2006	95 (150)	14 (14)	2 (6)	38 (47)	1 (2)	**150** (219)	0.685
12	(England) Stan Pearson	1937–1954	127 (312)	21 (30)	0 (0)	0 (0)	0 (1)	**148** (343)	0.431
13	(Scotland) David Herd	1961–1968	114 (202)	15 (35)	1 (1)	14 (25)	1 (2)	**145** (265)	0.547
13	(Portugal) Cristiano Ronaldo	2003–2009; 2021–2022	103 (236)	13 (27)	4 (12)	24 (68)	1 (3)	**145** (346)	0.419
15	(England) **Marcus Rashford**	2016–2025	87 (287)	9 (36)	16 (25)	26(75)	0 (3)	**138** (426)	0.324
16	(England) Tommy Taylor	1952–1958	112 (166)	5 (9)	0 (0)	11 (14)	3 (2)	**131** (191)	0.689

=== Assists ===
- Most League assists in a season: **21** – Bruno Fernandes, Premier League, 2025-2026

Rank	Player	Years	League	FA Cup	League Cup	Europe	Other^{[C]}	Total	Assists per game
1	(Wales) Ryan Giggs	1992–2014	171 (672)	32 (74)	9 (41)	50 (158)	8 (18)	**270** (963)	0.280
2	(England) Wayne Rooney	2004–2017	102 (393)	7 (40)	4 (20)	27 (99)	2 (7)	**142** (559)	0.254
3	(England) David Beckham	1992–2003	83 (263)	4 (24)	1 (12)	31 (84)	2 (9)	**121** (394)	0.307
4	**(Portugal) Bruno Fernandes**	2020–	72 (229)	7 (24)	4 (14)	22 (58)	1 (1)	**106** (326)	0.325
5	(England) Paul Scholes	1993–2011; 2012–2013	61 (499)	6 (47)	0 (21)	15 (136)	0 (13)	**82** (716)	0.112
6	(England) **Marcus Rashford**	2016–2025	49 (287)	6 (36)	8 (25)	15 (75)	0 (2)	**78** (426)	0.183
7	(England) Bobby Charlton	1956–1973	55 (606)	10 (66)	0 (24)	9 (34)	3 (16)	**77** (746)	0.103
8	(Portugal) Cristiano Ronaldo	2003–2009; 2021–2022	47 (236)	8 (27)	1 (12)	16 (66)	1 (3)	**73** (346)	0.210
9	(Portugal) Nani	2007–2014	48 (147)	4 (13)	0 (11)	12 (53)	1 (6)	**65** (230)	0.283
10	(France) Éric Cantona	1992–1997	52 (143)	3 (17)	1 (6)	4 (16)	3 (3)	**63** (185)	0.341

=== Clean sheets ===
- First clean sheet: John F. Slater vs. Higher Walton in the 1st qualifying round of the 1890–91 FA Cup (4 October 1890)
- Most clean sheets: **190** – David de Gea
- Most League clean sheets: **147** – David de Gea
- Most consecutive clean sheets: **12** – Edwin van der Sar (21 December 2008 – 24 February 2009)
- Most consecutive League clean sheets: **14** – Edwin van der Sar (15 November 2008 – 18 February 2009)

==== Overall clean sheets ====
Competitive, professional matches only, appearances including substitutes appear in brackets.

Rank	Player	Years	League	FA Cup	League Cup	Europe	Other^{[C]}	Total	Ratio
1	(Spain) David de Gea	2011–2023	147 (415)	6 (28)	8 (16)	28 (82)	1 (4)	**190** (545)	0.349
2	(Denmark) Peter Schmeichel	1991–1999	129 (292)	19 (41)	8 (17)	21 (42)	3 (6)	**180** (398)	0.452
3	(England) Alex Stepney	1966–1978	137 (433)	15 (44)	13 (35)	9 (19)	1 (4)	**175** (539)	0.325
4	(England) Gary Bailey	1978–1987	124 (294)	16 (31)	12 (28)	8 (20)	1 (2)	**161** (375)	0.429
5	(Netherlands) Edwin van der Sar	2005–2011	92 (186)	6 (13)	1 (5)	34 (56)	2 (6)	**135** (266)	0.508
6	(England) Alfred Steward	1920–1932	92 (309)	4 (17)	0 (0)	0 (0)	0 (0)	**96** (326)	0.294
7	(England) Harry Moger	1903–1912	83 (242)	8 (22)	0 (0)	0 (0)	1 (2)	**92** (266)	0.346
8	(England) Jack Crompton	1946–1955	59 (191)	8 (20)	0 (0)	0 (0)	0 (1)	**67** (212)	0.316
9	(England) Ray Wood	1949–1958	43 (178)	4 (15)	0 (0)	6 (12)	2 (3)	**55** (208)	0.264
10	(Scotland) Frank Barrett	1896–1900	50 (122)	4 (14)	0 (0)	0 (0)	0 (0)	**54** (136)	0.397
11	(England) Jack Mew	1912–1927	46 (186)	3 (13)	0 (0)	0 (0)	0 (0)	**49** (199)	0.246
11	(France) Fabien Barthez	2000–2004	33 (92)	1 (4)	1 (4)	14 (37)	0 (2)	**49** (139)	0.353
13	(Northern Ireland) Harry Gregg	1957–1967	34 (210)	8 (24)	0 (2)	2 (11)	0 (0)	**44** (247)	0.178
14	(Argentina) Sergio Romero	2015–2021	6 (7)	13 (17)	4 (9)	16 (28)	0 (0)	**39** (61)	0.639
15	(England) Bobby Beale	1912–1915	33 (105)	2 (7)	0 (0)	(0)	0 (0)	**35** (112)	0.313
15	(Northern Ireland) Roy Carroll	2001–2005	25 (49)	5 (8)	2 (5)	3 (10)	0 (0)	**35** (72)	0.486

=== Transfers ===
==== Highest transfer fees paid ====
Manchester United's record signing is Paul Pogba, who signed for the club from Juventus for a world record fee of £89.3 million in August 2016. The signing of Anthony Martial for £36 million in 2015 set a world record for the transfer of a teenager, and the £80 million paid for Harry Maguire in 2019 was a world record for a defender.

Rank	Player	From	Fee	Date
1	(France) Paul Pogba	(Italy) Juventus	£89.3 million	August 2016
2	(Brazil) Antony	(Netherlands) Ajax	£82 million	September 2022
3	(England) **Harry Maguire**	(England) Leicester City	£80 million	August 2019
4	(Belgium) Romelu Lukaku	(England) Everton	£75 million	July 2017
5	(England) **Jadon Sancho**	(Germany) Borussia Dortmund	£73 million	July 2021
6	(Denmark) **Rasmus Højlund**	(Italy) Atalanta	£72 million	August 2023
7	**(Slovenia) Benjamin Šeško**	(Germany) RB Leipzig	£66.3 million	August 2025
8	(Cameroon) **Bryan Mbeumo**	(England) Brentford	£65 million	July 2025
9	(Brazil) **Matheus Cunha**	(England) Wolverhampton Wanderers	£62.5 million	June 2025
10	(Brazil) **Casemiro**	(Spain) Real Madrid	£60 million	August 2022

==== Progression of record fee paid ====
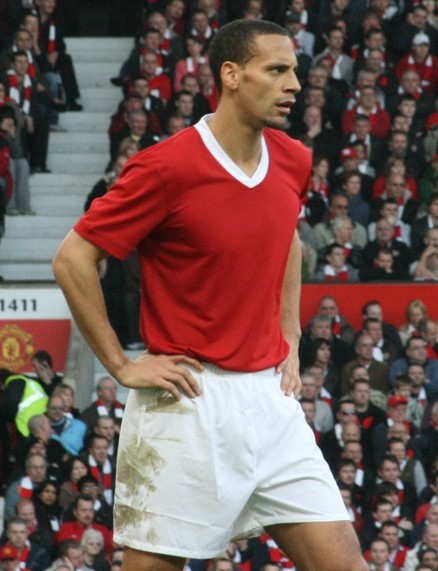
Rio Ferdinand, signed in July 2002 from Leeds United for £29.3 million, then Manchester United's most expensive purchase.

The first transfer for which Manchester United (then Newton Heath) had to pay a fee was the transfer of Gilbert Godsmark from Ashford in January 1900, paying £40 for the forward. The club's first £1,000 transfer came in 1910, when they signed Leslie Hofton from Glossop. When the club signed Tommy Taylor from Barnsley in 1953, the fee was intended to be £30,000. However, Matt Busby did not want to burden the young player with the "£30,000-man" tag, and Barnsley agreed for the fee to be reduced by £1 to £29,999. Busby then took the extra pound from his wallet and gave it to the lady who had been serving the teas.

Manchester United made their first six-figure signing in August 1962 with the transfer of Denis Law from Torino for £110,000, a new British record. The club broke the British transfer record again in 1981 with the £1.5 million signing of Bryan Robson from West Bromwich Albion. When Andy Cole signed for United in January 1995, the club paid £7 million, almost double their previous record of £3.75 million, which they paid for Roy Keane 18 months earlier. In the summer of 2001, the club broke their transfer record twice in the space of a month, first paying PSV Eindhoven £19 million for Ruud van Nistelrooy, and then £28.1 million to Lazio for Juan Sebastián Verón. Manchester United have broken the British transfer record three times since buying Verón, with the signings of Rio Ferdinand in July 2002, Ángel Di María in August 2014 and Paul Pogba, who was signed for £89.3 million in August 2016, a world record fee at the time.

Transfers in bold are also records for fees paid by British clubs

Date	Player	Bought from	Fee
January 1900	(England) Gilbert Godsmark	Ashford	£40
January 1903	(Scotland) Alex Bell	Ayr Parkhouse	£700
July 1910	(England) Leslie Hofton	Glossop	£1,000
March 1914	(England) George Hunter	Chelsea	£1,300
September 1920	(Scotland) Tom Miller	Liverpool	£2,000
November 1921	(Scotland) Neil McBain	Ayr United	£6,000
February 1938	(England) Jack Smith	Newcastle United	£6,500
March 1949	(Scotland) John Downie	Bradford Park Avenue	£18,000
March 1953	(England) Tommy Taylor	Barnsley	£29,999
September 1958	(England) Albert Quixall	Sheffield Wednesday	£45,000
August 1962	(Scotland) **Denis Law**	Torino	**£110,000**
August 1968	(Scotland) Willie Morgan	Burnley	£117,000
February 1972	(Scotland) Martin Buchan	Aberdeen	£125,000
March 1972	(England) Ian Storey-Moore	Nottingham Forest	£200,000
January 1978	(Scotland) Joe Jordan	Leeds United	£350,000
February 1978	(Scotland) **Gordon McQueen**	Leeds United	**£495,000**
August 1979	(England) Ray Wilkins	Chelsea	£825,000
October 1980	(England) Garry Birtles	Nottingham Forest	£1,250,000
October 1981	(England) **Bryan Robson**	West Bromwich Albion	**£1,500,000**
June 1988	(Wales) Mark Hughes	Barcelona	£1,800,000
August 1989	(England) Gary Pallister	Middlesbrough	£2,300,000
July 1993	(Republic of Ireland) **Roy Keane**	Nottingham Forest	**£3,750,000**
January 1995	(England) **Andy Cole**	Newcastle United	**£7,000,000**
July 1998	(Netherlands) Jaap Stam	PSV Eindhoven	£10,750,000
August 1998	(Trinidad and Tobago) Dwight Yorke	Aston Villa	£12,600,000
June 2001	(Netherlands) **Ruud van Nistelrooy**	PSV Eindhoven	**£19,000,000**
July 2001	(Argentina) **Juan Sebastián Verón**	Lazio	**£28,100,000**
July 2002	(England) **Rio Ferdinand**	Leeds United	**£29,300,000**
September 2008	(Bulgaria) Dimitar Berbatov	Tottenham Hotspur	£30,750,000
January 2014	(Spain) Juan Mata	Chelsea	£37,100,000
August 2014	(Argentina) **Ángel Di María**	Real Madrid	**£59,700,000**
August 2016	(France) **Paul Pogba**	Juventus	**£89,300,000**

==== Highest transfer fees received ====
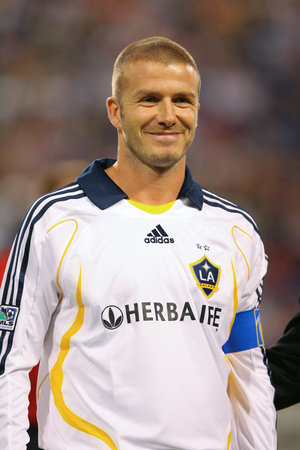
David Beckham was sold to Real Madrid for a then club record of £24.5 million in July 2003.

The club's record sale came in July 2009, when they sold Cristiano Ronaldo to Real Madrid for £80 million.

Rank	Player	To	Fee	Date
1	(Portugal) Cristiano Ronaldo	(Spain) Real Madrid	£80 million	July 2009
2	(Belgium) Romelu Lukaku	(Italy) Inter Milan	£74 million	August 2019
3	(Argentina) Ángel Di María	(France) Paris Saint-Germain	£44.3 million	August 2015
4	(Argentina) Alejandro Garnacho	(England) Chelsea	£40 million	August 2025
5	(England) Mason Greenwood	(France) Marseille	£26.6 million	July 2024
6	(Scotland) Scott McTominay	(Italy) Napoli	£25.7 million	August 2024
7	(Wales) Daniel James	(England) Leeds United	£25 million	August 2021
8	(England) David Beckham	(Spain) Real Madrid	£24.5 million	June 2003
9	(France) Morgan Schneiderlin	(England) Everton	£24 million	January 2017
10	(Netherlands) Memphis Depay	(France) Lyon	£16 million	January 2017

==== Progression of record fee received ====
The first player for whom Manchester United, then Newton Heath, received a fee was William Bryant, who moved to Blackburn Rovers for just £50 in April 1900. That same month, Manchester City paid five times more for Scottish forward Joe Cassidy. The club's first £1,000 sale came 12 years later with the sale of Harold Halse to Aston Villa.

The club's first British record sale came in March 1949, when Derby County paid £24,500 for Johnny Morris. However, 35 years passed before Manchester United next broke the record for the biggest sale by a British club; the sale of Ray Wilkins to Milan for £1.5 million in June 1984 was also the club's first million-pound sale. Another British record followed two years later with the sale of Mark Hughes to Barcelona for £2.5 million. The club's record sale increased fivefold in the space of two transfers over the next 15 years; first with the £7 million sale of Paul Ince to Internazionale in 1995, and then the 2001 transfer of Jaap Stam to Lazio for £15.25 million. Manchester United broke the world transfer record for the first time in July 2009 with the £80 million sale of Cristiano Ronaldo to Real Madrid.

Transfers in bold are also British record transfers

Date	Player	Sold to	Fee
April 1900	(England) William Bryant	Blackburn Rovers	£50
April 1900	(Scotland) Joe Cassidy	Manchester City	£250
October 1909	(Scotland) Alex Downie	Oldham Athletic	£600
June 1911	(England) Ted Connor	Sheffield United	£750
July 1912	(England) Harold Halse	Aston Villa	£1,200
August 1913	(England) Charlie Roberts	Oldham Athletic	£1,750
December 1920	(England) Tommy Meehan	Chelsea	£3,300
September 1937	(Scotland) George Mutch	Preston North End	£5,000
March 1948	(England) Joe Walton	Preston North End	£10,000
March 1949	(England) **Johnny Morris**	Derby County	**£24,500**
January 1962	(England) Dennis Viollet	Stoke City	£25,000
March 1962	(England) Warren Bradley	Bury	£40,000
June 1972	(Scotland) Francis Burns	Southampton	£50,000
June 1972	(England) Alan Gowling	Huddersfield Town	£60,000
March 1973	(Scotland) Ted MacDougall	West Ham United	£130,000
March 1977	(Republic of Ireland) Gerry Daly	Derby County	£175,000
April 1978	(England) Gordon Hill	Derby County	£250,000
August 1979	(England) Brian Greenhoff	Leeds United	£350,000
October 1980	(England) Andy Ritchie	Brighton & Hove Albion	£500,000
June 1984	(England) **Ray Wilkins**	Milan	**£1,500,000**
August 1986	(Wales) **Mark Hughes**	Barcelona	**£2,500,000**
July 1995	(England) Paul Ince	Internazionale	£7,000,000
August 2001	(Netherlands) Jaap Stam	Lazio	£15,250,000
June 2003	(England) David Beckham	Real Madrid	£24,500,000
July 2009	(Portugal) **Cristiano Ronaldo**	Real Madrid	**£80,000,000**

=== Honours ===
==== Players with the most titles won at the club ====
Rank	Player	Years	League	FA Cup	League Cup	FA Community Shield	Europe	Worldwide	Total
1	(Wales) Ryan Giggs	1991–2014	13	4	4	9	3	2	35
2	(England) Paul Scholes	1994–2011; 2012–2013	11	3	2	5	2	2	25
3	(England) Gary Neville	1992–2011	8	3	3	3	2	2	21
4	(Republic of Ireland) Denis Irwin	1990–2002	7	2	1	4	3	1	18
5	(Republic of Ireland) Roy Keane	1993–2005	7	4	0	4	1	1	17
5	(England) Michael Carrick	2006–2018	5	1	2	6	2	1	17
7	(England) Wayne Rooney	2004–2017	5	1	3	4	2	1	16
8	(England) Gary Pallister	1989–1998	4	3	3	5	2	0	15
8	(Denmark) Peter Schmeichel	1991–1999	5	3	1	4	1	1	15
8	(England) Nicky Butt	1992–2004	6	3	0	4	1	1	15
8	(Serbia) Nemanja Vidić	2006–2014	5	0	3	5	1	1	15

=== Individual awards ===
==== Laureus World Sports Awards ====
The following players have won Laureus World Sports Awards while playing for Manchester United:

- Laureus World Sports Award for Comeback of the Year
  - (Denmark) Christian Eriksen – 2023

==== Ballon d'Or ====
The following players have won the Ballon d'Or while playing for Manchester United:

- (Scotland) Denis Law – 1964
- (England) Bobby Charlton – 1966
- (Northern Ireland) George Best – 1968
- (Portugal) Cristiano Ronaldo – 2008

==== Golden Boy ====
The following players have won the Golden Boy while playing for Manchester United:

- (England) Wayne Rooney – 2004
- (Brazil) Anderson – 2008
- (France) Anthony Martial – 2015

==== European Golden Shoe ====
The following players have won the European Golden Shoe while playing for Manchester United:

- (Portugal) Cristiano Ronaldo (31 goals) – 2008

==== FIFA awards ====
The following players have won FIFA awards while playing for Manchester United:

- FIFA World Player of the Year
  - (Portugal) Cristiano Ronaldo – 2008
- FIFA Club World Cup Golden Ball
  - (England) Wayne Rooney – 2008
- FIFA Puskás Award
  - (Portugal) Cristiano Ronaldo – 2009
  - (Argentina) Alejandro Garnacho – 2024
- FIFA Foundation Award
  - (England) Marcus Rashford – 2020

==== UEFA awards ====
The following players have won the UEFA awards while playing for Manchester United:

- UEFA Club Footballer of the Year
  - (England) David Beckham – 1999
  - (Portugal) Cristiano Ronaldo – 2008
- UEFA Club Goalkeeper of the Year
  - (Denmark) Peter Schmeichel – 1997–98
  - (Netherlands) Edwin van der Sar – 2008–09
- UEFA Club Defender of the Year
  - (Netherlands) Jaap Stam (2) – 1998–99, 1999–2000
- UEFA Club Midfielder of the Year
  - (England) David Beckham – 1998–99
- UEFA Club Forward of the Year
  - (Netherlands) Ruud van Nistelrooy – 2002–03
  - (Portugal) Cristiano Ronaldo – 2007–08
- UEFA Team of the Year
  - (Portugal) Cristiano Ronaldo (4) – 2004, 2007, 2008, 2009
  - (England) David Beckham (2) – 2001, 2003
  - (Netherlands) Ruud van Nistelrooy – 2003
  - (France) Patrice Evra – 2009
  - (Argentina) Ángel Di María – 2014

==== AFC awards ====
The following players have won the AFC awards while playing for Manchester United:

- AFC Asian International Player of the Year
  - (Japan) Shinji Kagawa – 2012

==== CAF awards ====
The following players have won the CAF awards while playing for Manchester United:

- CAF Team of the Year
  - (Ivory Coast) Eric Bailly (3) – 2016, 2017, 2018
  - (Cameroon) André Onana – 2024

==== FIFPRO awards ====
The following players have won FIFPRO awards while playing for Manchester United:

- FIFPRO Special Young Player of the Year
  - (Portugal) Cristiano Ronaldo (2) – 2004, 2005
- FIFPRO Young Player of the Year
  - (England) Wayne Rooney – 2005
- FIFPRO World Player of the Year
  - (Portugal) Cristiano Ronaldo – 2008
- FIFPRO Player Impact Award
  - (England) Marcus Rashford – 2020
  - (Cameroon) Andre Onana – 2024
- FIFPRO World 11
  - (Portugal) Cristiano Ronaldo (4) – 2007, 2008, 2009, 2021
  - (Serbia) Nemanja Vidić (2) – 2009, 2011
  - (England) Rio Ferdinand – 2008
  - (France) Patrice Evra – 2009
  - (England) Wayne Rooney – 2011
  - (Argentina) Ángel Di María – 2014
  - (Spain) David de Gea – 2018
  - (Brazil) Casemiro – 2022

==== International Federation of Football History & Statistics (IFFHS) awards ====
The following players have won International Federation of Football History & Statistics awards while playing for Manchester United:

- IFFHS World's Best Goalkeeper
  - (Denmark) Peter Schmeichel (2) – 1992, 1993
  - (France) Fabien Barthez – 2000
- IFFHS World Team
  - (Portugal) Cristiano Ronaldo – 2021
- IFFHS Men's Youth (U20) World Team
  - (Argentina) Alejandro Garnacho (2) – 2023, 2024
  - (England) Mason Greenwood – 2021
  - (Denmark) Rasmus Hojlund – 2023
  - (France) Leny Yoro – 2024
  - (England) Kobbie Mainoo – 2024

==== Professional Footballers' Association (PFA) awards ====
The following players have won PFA awards while playing for Manchester United:

- PFA Merit Award
  - (Wales) Ryan Giggs – 2015–16
  - (England) Marcus Rashford – 2019–20
- PFA Community Champion Award
  - (England) Marcus Rashford – 2019–20
- PFA Players' Player of the Year
  - (Wales) Mark Hughes (2) – 1988–89, 1990–91
  - (Portugal) Cristiano Ronaldo (2) – 2006–07, 2007–08
  - (England) Gary Pallister – 1991–92
  - (France) Eric Cantona – 1993–94
  - (Republic of Ireland) Roy Keane – 1999–2000
  - (England) Teddy Sheringham – 2000–01
  - (Netherlands) Ruud van Nistelrooy – 2001–02
  - (Wales) Ryan Giggs – 2008–09
  - (England) Wayne Rooney – 2009–10
  - (Portugal) Bruno Fernandes – 2025–26
- PFA Young Player of the Year
  - (Wales) Ryan Giggs (2) – 1991–92, 1992–93
  - (England) Wayne Rooney (2) – 2004–05, 2005–06
  - (Wales) Mark Hughes – 1984–85
  - (England) Lee Sharpe – 1990–91
  - (England) David Beckham – 1996–97
  - (Portugal) Cristiano Ronaldo – 2006–07
- PFA Fans' Player of the Year
  - (Portugal) Cristiano Ronaldo (2) – 2007, 2008
  - (England) Wayne Rooney (2) – 2006, 2010
  - (Netherlands) Ruud van Nistelrooy – 2002
  - (England) Marcus Rashford – 2023
- PFA Team of the Year

==== Football Writers' Association (FWA) awards ====
The following players have won FWA awards while playing for Manchester United:

- FWA Tribute Award
  - (Wales) Ryan Giggs – 2006–07
  - (England) Wayne Rooney – 2016–17
  - (England) Marcus Rashford – 2020–21
- FWA Footballer of the Year
  - (Portugal) Cristiano Ronaldo (2) – 2006–07, 2007–08
  - (Republic of Ireland) Johnny Carey – 1948–49
  - (England) Bobby Charlton – 1965–66
  - (Northern Ireland) George Best – 1967–68
  - (France) Eric Cantona – 1995–96
  - (Republic of Ireland) Roy Keane – 1999–2000
  - (England) Teddy Sheringham – 2000–01
  - (England) Wayne Rooney – 2009–10
  - (Portugal) Bruno Fernandes – 2025–26

==== Premier League awards ====
The following players have won Premier League awards while playing for Manchester United:

- Premier League Hall of Fame
  - 2021 – (England) David Beckham, (France) Eric Cantona, (Republic of Ireland) Roy Keane
  - 2022 – (England) Wayne Rooney, (Denmark) Peter Schmeichel, (England) Paul Scholes
  - 2023 – (England) Rio Ferdinand
  - 2024 – (England) Andy Cole
  - 2025 – (England) Gary Neville
- Premier League Merit Award
  - (Wales) Ryan Giggs – 2006–07
  - (Portugal) Cristiano Ronaldo – 2007–08
  - (Netherlands) Edwin van der Sar – 2008–09
- Premier League Player of the Season
  - (Portugal) Cristiano Ronaldo (2) – 2006–07, 2007–08
  - (Serbia) Nemanja Vidić (2) – 2008–09, 2010–11
  - (Denmark) Peter Schmeichel – 1995–96
  - (Trinidad and Tobago) Dwight Yorke – 1998–99
  - (Netherlands) Ruud van Nistelrooy – 2002–03
  - (England) Wayne Rooney – 2009–10
  - (Portugal) Bruno Fernandes – 2025–26
- Premier League Golden Glove
  - (Spain) David de Gea (2) – 2017–18, 2022–23
  - (Netherlands) Edwin van der Sar – 2008–09
- Premier League Golden Boot
  - (Trinidad and Tobago) Dwight Yorke – 1998–99
  - (Netherlands) Ruud van Nistelrooy – 2002–03
  - (Portugal) Cristiano Ronaldo – 2007–08
  - (Bulgaria) Dimitar Berbatov – 2010–11
  - (Netherlands) Robin van Persie – 2012–13
- Premier League Playmaker of the Season
  - (Portugal) Bruno Fernandes (21 assists) – 2025–26
- Premier League Transfer of the Season
  - (Belgium) Senne Lammens – 2025–26
- Premier League Goal of the Season
  - 1996–97 – (England) David Beckham vs Wimbledon on 17 August 1996
  - 2006–07 – (England) Wayne Rooney vs Bolton Wanderers on 17 March 2007
  - 2010–11 – (England) Wayne Rooney vs Manchester City on 12 February 2011
  - 2012–13 – (Netherlands) Robin van Persie vs Aston Villa on 22 April 2013
  - 2023–24 – (Argentina) Alejandro Garnacho vs Everton on 26 November 2023
- Premier League 10 Seasons Awards
  - Teams of the Decade (10 of 22 players) – (Denmark) Peter Schmeichel, (England) Gary Neville, (Netherlands) Jaap Stam, (England) Steve Bruce, (Republic of Ireland) Denis Irwin, (England) David Beckham, (England) Paul Scholes, (Republic of Ireland) Roy Keane, (Wales) Ryan Giggs, (France) Eric Cantona
  - Overseas Player of the Decade – (France) Eric Cantona
  - Goal of the Decade – (England) David Beckham vs Wimbledon on 17 August 1996
  - Save of the Decade – (Denmark) Peter Schmeichel vs Newcastle United on 21 December 1997
- Premier League 20 Seasons Awards
  - Best Player – (Wales) Ryan Giggs
  - Best Goal – (England) Wayne Rooney vs Manchester City on 12 February 2011
  - Best Goal Celebration – (France) Eric Cantona vs Sunderland on 21 December 1996
- Premier League Player of the Month
- Premier League Save of the Month
- Premier League Goal of the Month

==== British honours ====
The following players were awarded British honours while playing for Manchester United:

- **Order of the British Empire (OBE)**
  - (England) Bryan Robson – 1990
  - (Wales) Ryan Giggs – 2007
- **Member of the Order of the British Empire (MBE)**
  - (England) Marcus Rashford – 2020

==== BBC Sports Awards ====
The following players were awarded BBC Sports Awards while playing for Manchester United:

- **BBC Sports Personality of the Year Award**
  - (England) David Beckham – 2001
  - (Wales) Ryan Giggs – 2009
- **BBC Goal of the Season**
  - (England) Wayne Rooney – (3) 2004–05, 2006–07, 2010–11
  - (Wales) Ryan Giggs – 1998–99
  - (Netherlands) Robin van Persie – 2012–13
  - (Argentina) Alejandro Garnacho – 2023–24

=== International ===
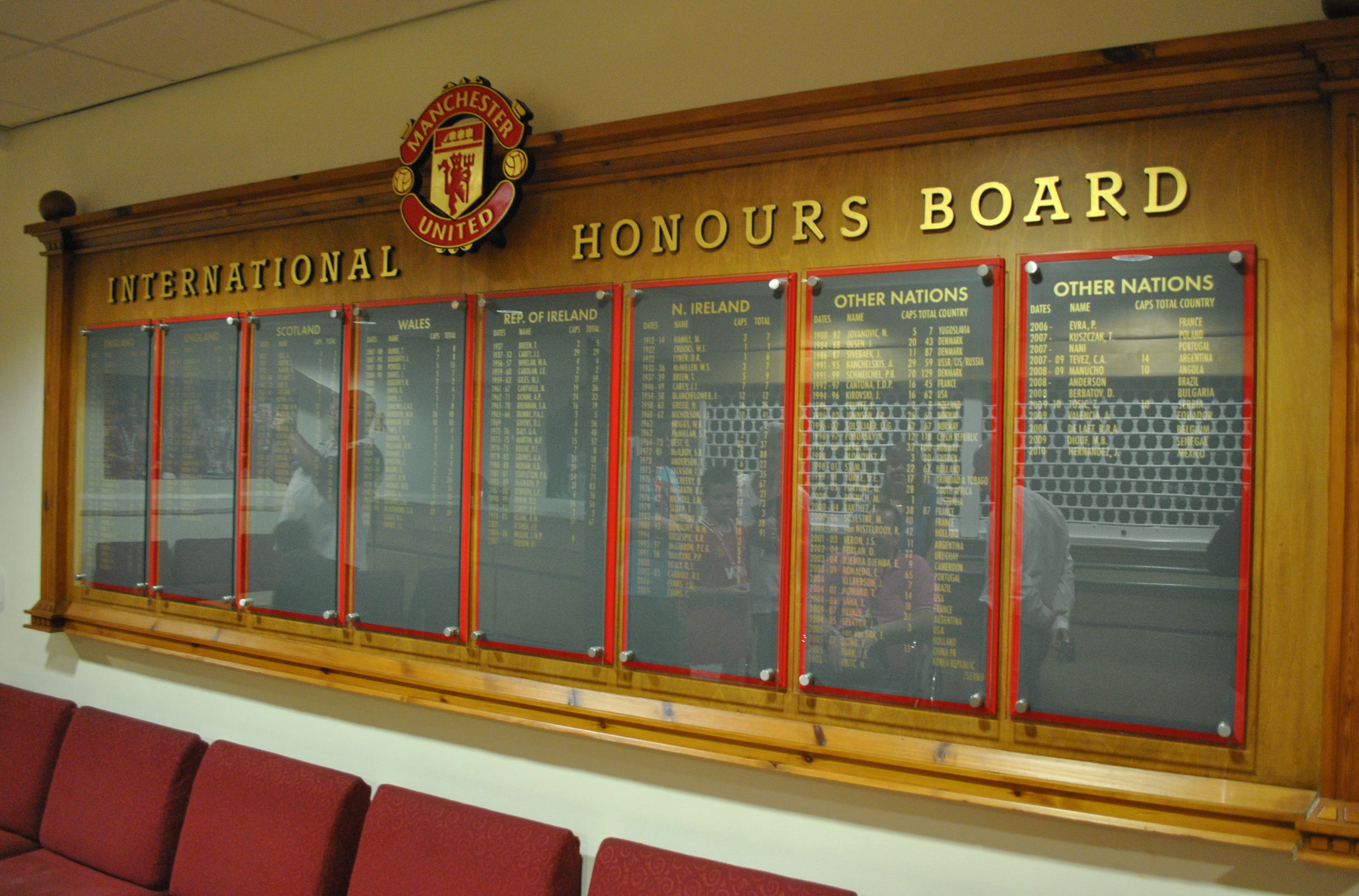
Manchester United's international players are listed in the players' lounge at Old Trafford.

- First international: Jack Powell and Tom Burke for Wales against England (26 February 1887)
  - All nine of Newton Heath's international players played for Wales. The first non-Welshman to be capped, and the first after the club's change of name to Manchester United, was Charlie Roberts, who was capped for England against Ireland on 25 February 1905.
- Most international caps (total): **201** – Cristiano Ronaldo – Portugal (82 while with the club)
- Most international caps as a United player: **106** – Bobby Charlton – England

==== Honours ====
Current Manchester United players in bold. Last updated 14 July 2024.

FIFA World Cup

The following players have won the FIFA World Cup while playing for Manchester United:

- (England) Bobby Charlton – 1966
- (England) John Connelly – 1966
- (England) Nobby Stiles – 1966
- (France) Paul Pogba – 2018
- (Argentina) **Lisandro Martínez** – 2022

FIFA Confederations Cup

The following players have won the FIFA Confederations Cup while playing for Manchester United:

- (France) Mikaël Silvestre – 2001, 2003
- (France) Fabien Barthez – 2003

UEFA European Championship

The following players have won the UEFA European Championship while playing for Manchester United:

- (Denmark) Peter Schmeichel – 1992
- (France) Fabien Barthez^{[F]} – 2000

UEFA Nations League

The following players have won the UEFA Nations League while playing for Manchester United:

- (France) Anthony Martial – 2021
- (France) Paul Pogba – 2021
- (France) Raphaël Varane – 2021
- (Portugal) **Bruno Fernandes** – 2025
- (Portugal) **Diogo Dalot** – 2025

Copa América

The following players have won the Copa América while playing for Manchester United:

- (Brazil) Kléberson – 2004
- (Argentina) Alejandro Garnacho – 2024
- (Argentina) **Lisandro Martínez** – 2024

Africa Cup of Nations

The following players have won the Africa Cup of Nations while playing for Manchester United:

- (Morocco) Noussair Mazraoui – 2025

CONCACAF Gold Cup

The following players have won the CONCACAF Gold Cup while playing for Manchester United:

- (Mexico) Javier Hernández – 2011

Olympic Games

The following players have won a gold medal in football at the Olympic Games while playing for Manchester United:

- (United Kingdom) Harold Hardman – 1908
- (Argentina) Gabriel Heinze^{[G]} – 2004

==== Individual awards ====
CONCACAF Gold Cup

The following players have won CONCACAF Gold Cup awards while playing for Manchester United:

- CONCACAF Gold Cup Golden Ball
  - (Mexico) Javier Hernández – 2011
- CONCACAF Gold Cup Golden Boot
  - (Mexico) Javier Hernández (7 goals) – 2011

== Managers ==
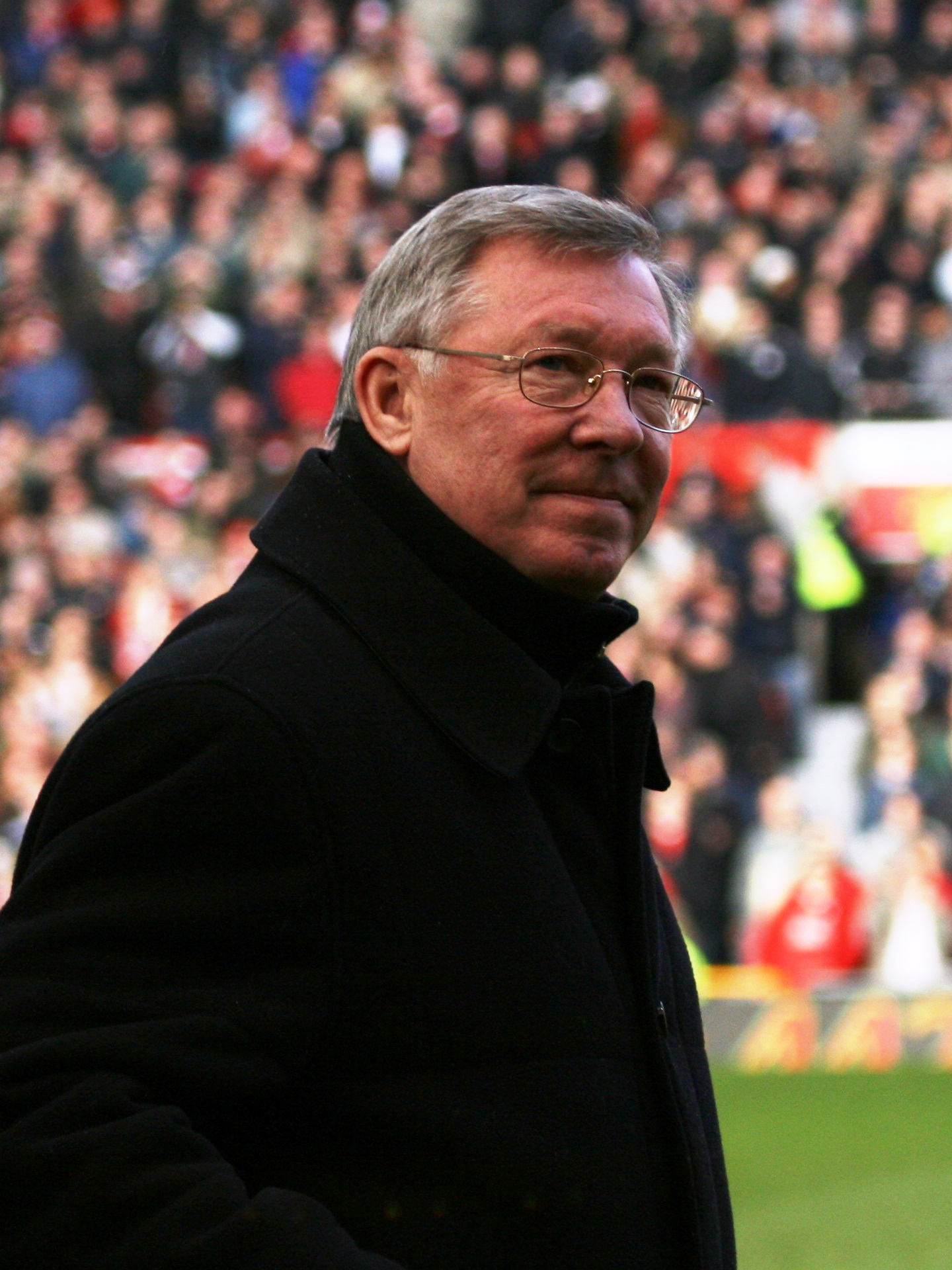
Sir Alex Ferguson was the manager of Manchester United for 1,500 matches, more than any other manager.

- First full-time manager: Jack Robson – Robson was manager of Manchester United for 6 years and 10 months, starting on 28 December 1914, before pneumonia forced his retirement in October 1921.
- Longest-serving manager: Sir Alex Ferguson – 26 years, 194 days (1,500 matches; 6 November 1986 to 19 May 2013)

=== Individual awards ===
FIFA awards

The following managers have won FIFA awards while managing Manchester United:

- FIFA Presidential Award
  - (Scotland) Sir Alex Ferguson – 2011

UEFA awards

The following managers have won UEFA awards while managing Manchester United:

- UEFA Manager of the Year
  - (Scotland) Sir Alex Ferguson – 1998–99
- UEFA Team of the Year
  - (Scotland) Sir Alex Ferguson – 2007, 2008

International Federation of Football History & Statistics (IFFHS) awards

The following managers have won IFFHS awards while managing Manchester United:

- IFFHS World's Best Club Coach
  - (Scotland) Sir Alex Ferguson – 1999, 2008
- IFFHS All Time World's Best Coach 1996–2020
  - (Scotland) Sir Alex Ferguson

League Managers Association (LMA) awards

The following managers have won LMA awards while managing Manchester United:

- LMA Manager of the Year
  - (Scotland) Sir Alex Ferguson – 1992–93, 1998–99, 2007–08, 2010–11, 2012–13
- LMA Special Merit Award
  - (Scotland) Sir Alex Ferguson – 2009, 2011

Football Writers' Association (FWA) awards

The following managers have won the FWA awards while managing Manchester United:

- FWA Tribute Award
  - (Scotland) Sir Alex Ferguson – 1996

Professional Footballers' Association (PFA) awards

The following managers have won PFA awards while managing Manchester United:

- PFA Merit Award
  - (Scotland) Sir Alex Ferguson – 2007

Premier League awards

The following managers have won Premier League awards while managing Manchester United:

- Premier League Hall of Fame
  - (Scotland) Sir Alex Ferguson – 2023
- Premier League Merit Award
  - (Scotland) Sir Alex Ferguson – 2012–13
- Premier League 10 Seasons Awards
  - (Scotland) Sir Alex Ferguson – Best Manager
- Premier League 20 Seasons Awards
  - (Scotland) Sir Alex Ferguson – Manager of the Decade
- Premier League Manager of the Season
  - (Scotland) Sir Alex Ferguson – 1993–94, 1995–96, 1997–98, 1998–99, 1999– 2000, 2002–03, 2006–07, 2007–08, 2008–09, 2010–11, 2012–13
- Premier League Manager of the Month

British honours

The following managers were awarded British honours while managing Manchester United:

- Commander of the Most Excellent Order of the British Empire (CBE)
  - (Scotland) Sir Matt Busby – 1958
  - (Scotland) Sir Alex Ferguson – 1995
- Knight Bachelor
  - (Scotland) Sir Matt Busby – 1968
  - (Scotland) Sir Alex Ferguson – 1999

BBC Sports Awards

The following managers were awarded BBC Sports Awards while playing for Manchester United:

- BBC Sports Personality Diamond Award
  - (Scotland) Sir Alex Ferguson – 2013
- BBC Sports Personality of the Year Lifetime Achievement Award
  - (Scotland) Sir Alex Ferguson – 2001
- BBC Sports Personality of the Year Coach Award
  - (Scotland) Sir Alex Ferguson – 1999

== Team records ==
=== Matches ===
- First competitive match: Newton Heath 2–7 Blackburn Olympic Reserves, Lancashire Cup, 27 October 1883
- First FA Cup match: Fleetwood Rangers 2–2 Newton Heath, first round, 30 October 1886
- First Combination match: Newton Heath 4–3 Darwen, 22 September 1888
- First Football Alliance match: Newton Heath 4–1 Sunderland Albion, 21 September 1889
- First Football League match: Blackburn Rovers 4–3 Newton Heath, 3 September 1892
- First match at Old Trafford: Manchester United 3–4 Liverpool, 19 February 1910
- First European match: Anderlecht 0–2 Manchester United, European Cup preliminary round, first leg, 12 September 1956
- First League Cup match: Exeter City 1–1 Manchester United, first round, 19 October 1960

==== Record wins ====
- Record win: 10–0 v Anderlecht, European Cup preliminary round, second leg, 26 September 1956
- Record League win:

10–1 v Wolverhampton Wanderers, First Division, 15 October 1892
9–0 v Walsall, Second Division, 3 April 1895
9–0 v Darwen, Second Division, 24 December 1898
9–0 v Ipswich Town, Premier League, 4 March 1995
9–0 v Southampton, Premier League, 2 February 2021

- Record FA Cup win: 8–0 v Yeovil Town, 12 February 1949
- Record European win: 10–0 v Anderlecht, European Cup preliminary round, second leg, 26 September 1956
- Record Champions League win: 7–1 v Roma, Champions League quarter-final, second leg, 10 April 2007
- Record home win: 10–0 v Anderlecht, European Cup preliminary round, second leg, 26 September 1956
- Record away win:

7–0 v Grimsby Town, Second Division, 26 December 1899
8–1 v Nottingham Forest, Premier League, 6 February 1999

==== Record defeats ====
- Record defeat: 0–7

v Blackburn Rovers, First Division, 10 April 1926
v Aston Villa, First Division, 27 December 1930
v Wolverhampton Wanderers, Second Division, 26 December 1931
v Liverpool, Premier League, 5 March 2023

- Record League defeat: 0–7

v Blackburn Rovers, First Division, 10 April 1926
v Aston Villa, First Division, 27 December 1930
v Wolverhampton Wanderers, Second Division, 26 December 1931
v Liverpool, Premier League, 5 March 2023

- Record Premier League defeat:

0–7 v Liverpool, 5 March 2023

- Record FA Cup defeat:

1–7 v Burnley, first round, 13 February 1901
0–6 v Sheffield Wednesday, second round, 20 February 1904

- Record European defeat: 0–5 v Sporting CP, Cup Winners' Cup quarter-final, 18 March 1964
- Record home defeat:

0–6 v Aston Villa, First Division, 14 March 1914
1–7 v Newcastle United, First Division, 10 September 1927
0–6 v Huddersfield Town, First Division, 10 September 1930

- Record away defeat: 0–7

v Blackburn Rovers, First Division, 10 April 1926
v Aston Villa, First Division, 27 December 1930
v Wolverhampton Wanderers, Second Division, 26 December 1931
v Liverpool, Premier League, 5 March 2023

==== Streaks ====
- Longest unbeaten run (all major competitions)^{[D]}: 45 matches, 26 December 1998 to 3 October 1999
- Longest unbeaten run (League): 29 matches
  - 26 December 1998 to 25 September 1999
  - 11 April 2010 to 5 February 2011
- Longest unbeaten home run (all major competitions): 40 matches
  - 16 December 1964 to 30 March 1966
  - 24 September 2016 to 5 December 2017
- Longest unbeaten home run (League): 36 matches, 26 December 1998 to 17 December 2000
- Longest unbeaten away run (all major competitions): 21 Matches, 5 December 1998 to 22 September 1999
- Longest unbeaten away run (League): 29 matches, 17 February 2020 to 16 October 2021
- Longest winning streak (League): 14 matches, 15 October 1904 to 3 January 1905
- Longest losing streak (League): 14 matches, 26 April 1930 to 25 October 1930
- Longest drawing streak (League): 6 matches, 30 October 1988 to 27 November 1988
- Longest streak without a win (League): 16 matches, 19 April 1930 to 25 October 1930
- Longest scoring run (League): 36 matches, 3 December 2007 to 15 November 2008
- Longest non-scoring run (League): 5 matches
  - 22 February 1902 to 17 March 1902;
  - 7 February 1981 to 14 March 1981
- Longest unbeaten run from half-time leads: 12 May 1984 to date
- Longest streak without conceding a goal (League): 14 matches, 15 November 2008 to 18 February 2009

==== Wins/draws/losses in a season ====
- Most wins in a league season: 28 – 1905–06, 1956–57, 1999–2000, 2006–07, 2008–09, 2011–12, 2012–13
- Most draws in a league season: 18 – 1980–81
- Most defeats in a league season: 27 – 1930–31
- Fewest wins in a league season: 6 – 1892–93, 1893–94
- Fewest draws in a league season: 2 – 1893–94
- Fewest defeats in a league season: 3 – 1998–99, 1999–2000

=== Goals ===
- Most League goals scored in a season: 103 – 1956–57, 1958–59
- Most Premier League goals scored in a season: 97 – 1999–2000
- Fewest League goals scored in a season: 36 – 1893–94
- Most League goals conceded in a season: 115 – 1930–31
- Fewest League goals conceded in a season: 22 – 2007–08

=== Points ===
- Most points in a season:

Two points for a win: 64 in 42 matches, First Division, 1956–57
Three points for a win:

92 in 42 matches, Premier League, 1993–94
91 in 38 matches, Premier League, 1999–2000

- Fewest points in a season:

Two points for a win:

22 in 42 matches, First Division, 1930–31
14 in 30 matches, First Division, 1893–94

Three points for a win: 48 in 38 matches, First Division, 1989–90

=== Attendances ===
- Highest home attendance: 83,260 v Arsenal at Maine Road,^{[E]} First Division, 17 January 1948
- Highest home attendance at Old Trafford: 76,098 v Blackburn Rovers, 31 March 2007
- Highest away attendance: 135,000 v Real Madrid, European Cup, 11 April 1957
- Lowest post-War home league attendance: 8,456 v Stoke City at Maine Road,^{[E]} First Division, 5 February 1947

== See also ==
- List of Manchester United W.F.C. records and statistics

== Footnotes ==
A. Between 1949 and 1993, when the Charity Shield finished in a draw, the Shield would be shared by the two teams. In the 1980s and early 1990s, the Shield itself was held by each club for six months.
B. The Premier League took over from the First Division as the top tier of the English football league system upon its formation in 1992. The First Division then became the second tier of English football, the Second Division became the third tier, and so on. The First Division is now known as the Football League Championship, while the Second Division is now known as Football League One.
C. The "Other" column constitutes goals and appearances in the FA Community Shield, the UEFA Super Cup, the Intercontinental Cup and the FIFA Club World Cup.
D. Major competitions include the Premier League, the FA Cup, the League Cup and the UEFA Champions League.
E. Due to bomb damage to Old Trafford, in the period between the end of the Second World War and 1949, Manchester United played their home games at Maine Road, the home of Manchester City, with the exception of two FA Cup matches in the 1947–48 season, which were played at Goodison Park, Liverpool, and Leeds Road, Huddersfield, respectively.
F. Barthez had just sealed his move from Monaco before the tournament had begun and had yet to make his United debut.
G. Heinze had moved from Paris Saint-Germain before the tournament had begun and had yet to make his United debut.
