= Charlie Mitten =

English footballer (1921–2002)

Personal information
- Full name: Charles Mitten
- Date of birth: 17 January 1921
- Place of birth: Rangoon, Burma, British India
- Date of death: 2 January 2002 (aged 80)
- Position: Outside forward

Senior career*
Years	Team	Apps	(Gls)
1946–1950	Manchester United	142	(50)
1950–1951	Independiente Santa Fe	34	(15)
1951–1955	Fulham	154	(33)
1955–1958	Mansfield Town	100	(25)
Total		396	(121)

Managerial career
- 1955–1958: Mansfield Town
- 1958–1961: Newcastle United
- 1962–1963: Altrincham
- * Club domestic league appearances and goals

Charles Mitten (17 January 1921 – 2 January 2002) was an English football player and manager who came through the junior ranks at Manchester United. Over his career, Mitten also played for Fulham, Mansfield Town and Altrincham in England, and for Independiente Santa Fe in Colombia, where he had a notable stint, and where he and a number of other players left to escape the maximum wage that was imposed for footballers in England at the time. After his playing career finished, he was involved in football management.

== Playing career ==
Mitten signed with Manchester United in 1936, and was in the junior side with future colleagues Stan Pearson and Johnny Carey. However, due to the suspension of league football owing to the outbreak of war, his first professional appearance did not come until 1946.

During the war, Mitten served in the Royal Air Force, guesting for whatever club was nearest his station. He had two seasons playing for Chelsea and made 22 guest appearances for Southampton, scoring five goals.

After the war, Mitten rejoined Manchester United and proved himself as an excellent winger during the early years of Matt Busby's time at the club. He was part of a talented forward line alongside Jimmy Delaney, Stan Pearson, Jack Rowley and Johnny Morris, which became known as the 'Famous Five' of Old Trafford.

In his four years at United, he helped the club finish as runners-up in the league three times and in fourth place once. He also played in the 4–2 win over Blackpool in the 1948 FA Cup Final. Over the course of his United career, he made 152 appearances in total, scoring 61 goals.

=== The "Bogota Bandit" ===
In 1950, United went on a 12-game tour of America, where they played in front of massive, sell-out crowds. It was at this point that Mitten questioned the small amount of money footballers received – the maximum wage in Britain was £12 a week – compared to their evident global popularity. This point was underlined when two other British footballers, Neil Franklin and George Mountford, signed for the same Independiente Santa Fe in Colombia, where the league had broken away from FIFA control, which meant that clubs did not have to pay transfer fees to foreign clubs, resulting in many top players from abroad playing in Colombia in a period nicknamed El Dorado. During the tour, Mitten was approached by a wealthy Colombian businessmen to play for Independiente Santa Fe in Bogotá. Mitten's signing-on fee was reputedly £5,000 plus a weekly wage of at least £40. For this, he was given the nickname "The Bogotá Bandit", which later became the title of his autobiography. He played in Colombia for a year, scoring fifteen times in 34 games, and United's form suffered in his absence.

At the end of his first year Colombia joined FIFA and became subject to FIFA regulations. As Manchester United still held his registration, Mitten was unable to play for anyone but them and had to return to England. He was, however, offered a contract by Santiago Bernabéu, the manager of Real Madrid, who was in the process of forming the all-conquering team that would feature Alfredo Di Stéfano, Francisco Gento and Héctor Rial. He turned down this offer, and later stated his regret at not being able to be a part of the successful Real side.

=== Return to England ===
Upon his return, Mitten was subject to a ban by The Football Association, who fined him six months' wages and banned him from playing for the same period. He was also ostracised by Busby, who sold him to Fulham for £22,000 in December 1951. Now aged 31, Mitten made 16 appearances and scored six goals in his first season at Craven Cottage, but could not save the club from relegation to the Second Division. The next season, he played 40 times for another six goals, forming a pair with the young Johnny Haynes. During his time at Fulham, he was picked for the London XI in the Inter-Cities Fairs Cup.

=== International career ===
Mitten made one appearance for England in an unofficial charity match against Scotland in 1946.

== Managerial career ==
While still a player, Mitten was appointed player-coach of Mansfield Town. Mitten joined the club in February 1956 and remained there for over two years until June 1958. He played 100 league games, scoring 25 league goals. His reign was a success and Mitten's side was praised for their entertaining football. In the 1957–58 season, his side scored 100 goals in League. In his biography, Mitten stated: "The Mansfield job was the best I ever had in football". At Mansfield, he also gave a debut his 16-year-old son, John, who later went on to play for a number of clubs, including Coventry City.

In June 1958, Mitten left Mansfield and joined Newcastle United. Initially, he enjoyed success at the club and steered the club to a pair of solid mid-table finishes, despite an ongoing power struggle between chairman William McKeag (who had installed Mitten and gave him full control over the team) and director and former manager Stan Seymour (who felt the board should be able to veto Mitten's tactics and team selections). Newcastle gained a reputation for free-scoring football under Mitten, but they also proved to be defensively frail, and they ultimately paid the price for this in 1961, when they were relegated after a season in which they scored 86 goals but conceded 109. Mitten was allowed to remain in charge and attempt to steer the club back into the First Division, but instead they found themselves fighting relegation to the Third Division, eventually resulting in Mitten's dismissal a few months into the season. While at Newcastle, he was also involved in the George Eastham affair, which involved another player who challenged the authorities on player's rights.

Subsequent to this, he made a brief playing comeback, serving as player-manager at non-league Altrincham before retiring to the sport of greyhound racing, taking up the position of Assistant Racing Manager at White City Stadium in 1977.

== Personal life ==
Several of Mitten's brothers also played professional football, and many male members of his extended family, into the next generation or two, were at least semi-professional.

Mitten died in January 2002, shortly before his 81st birthday.

His nephew Albert Scanlon (1935–2009), signed for Manchester United soon after Mitten's departure in the early 1950s and remained with the club until 1960. He was a survivor of the Munich air disaster.

His great-nephew, Andy Mitten, is a football journalist and has been editor of the Manchester United fanzine United We Stand since the late 1980s, while another great-nephew, Sam Mitten, is on the books at Stockport County. Jonathan Mitten, also a great-nephew, was the first signing for F.C. United of Manchester.

== Career statistics ==
Appearances and goals by club, season and competition
Club	Season	League		FA Cup		Other		Total	
Club	Season	Apps	Goals	Apps	Goals	Apps	Goals	Apps	Goals
Manchester United	1946–47	20	8	0	0	0	0	20	8
Manchester United	1947–48	38	8	6	3	0	0	44	11
Manchester United	1948–49	42	18	8	5	1	0	51	23
Manchester United	1949–50	42	16	5	3	0	0	47	19
Manchester United	Total	142	50	19	11	1	0	162	61

== Honours ==
Manchester United

- FA Cup: 1947–48
