= John Mitten =

English cricketer and footballer

John Mitten (born 30 March 1941) is an English former sportsman who played both football and cricket during the 1950s, '60s and '70s.

== Football career ==
John Mitten
Personal information
- Date of birth: 30 March 1941 (age 85)
- Place of birth: Manchester, England
- Position: Left winger

Senior career*
Years	Team	Apps	(Gls)
1957–1958	Mansfield Town	3	(0)
1958–1961	Newcastle United	9	(3)
1961–1963	Leicester City	12	(0)
1963–1967	Coventry City	36	(5)
1967–1968	Plymouth Argyle	43	(8)
1968–1971	Exeter City	100	(17)
- Bath City
- Trowbridge Town
Total		203	(33)

Managerial career
- Tiverton Town
- Sidmouth Town
- * Club domestic league appearances and goals

Born in Manchester, Mitten played as a left winger for Mansfield Town, Newcastle United, Leicester City, Coventry City, Plymouth Argyle, Exeter City, Bath City and Trowbridge Town, making 203 appearances in the Football League. After retiring as a player, Mitten became a manager, and was in charge of Tiverton Town and Sidmouth Town.

He is the son of fellow footballer Charlie Mitten.

== Cricket career ==
He was active from 1958 to 1963 for Leicestershire. He appeared in 14 first-class matches as a right-handed batsman who kept wicket. He scored 259 runs with a highest score of 50* and completed 23 catches.
