= Cliff Collinson =

English footballer

Personal information
- Full name: Clifford Collinson
- Date of birth: 3 March 1920
- Place of birth: Middlesbrough, England
- Date of death: September 1990 (age 70)
- Height: 5 ft 11 in (1.80 m)
- Position: Goalkeeper

Youth career
- 1946: Manchester United

Senior career*
Years	Team	Apps	(Gls)
1946–1947	Manchester United	7	(0)
- * Club domestic league appearances and goals

Clifford Collinson (3 March 1920 – September 1990) was an English footballer who played as a goalkeeper for Manchester United during the 1946–47 season.

Born in Middlesbrough, in north-east England, Collinson was spotted playing for Urmston Boys Club towards the end of the Second World War and joined Manchester United as an amateur in May 1946. He turned professional in September 1946, before making his debut for the club in a scoreless draw away to Aston Villa on 2 November 1946. He went on a run of seven consecutive games, culminating with a 2–1 defeat to Blackburn Rovers at Ewood Park on 14 December 1946. However, he was not able to claim the "number one" jersey from Jack Crompton on a regular basis and never played for the club again.
