= Joe Lancaster (footballer) =

English footballer (1926–2024)

Personal information
- Date of birth: 28 April 1926
- Place of birth: Stockport, England
- Date of death: 8 October 2024 (aged 98)
- Place of death: Stockport, England
- Position: Goalkeeper

Senior career*
Years	Team	Apps	(Gls)
1949–1950	Manchester United	4	(0)
1950–	Accrington Stanley		
- * Club domestic league appearances and goals

Joseph Gerard Lancaster (28 April 1926 – 8 October 2024) was an English footballer who played as a goalkeeper. He played for Manchester United and Accrington Stanley in The Football League in the late 1940s and early 1950s. He was born in Stockport. In November 2016, he was noted as being Manchester United's oldest living former player. Lancaster died in Stockport on 8 October 2024, at the age of 98.
