= Leslie Hofton =

English footballer (1888–1971)

Personal information
- Full name: Leslie Brown Hofton
- Date of birth: 3 March 1888
- Place of birth: Sheffield, England
- Date of death: 3 February 1971 (aged 82)
- Position: Full back

Senior career*
Years	Team	Apps	(Gls)
1904–1906	Kiveton Park		
1906–1907	Worksop Town		
1907–1908	Denaby United		
1908–1910	Glossop	53	(6)
1910–1913	Manchester United	16	(0)
1913–1914	Mexborough Town		
1919–1921	Manchester United	1	(0)
- * Club domestic league appearances and goals

Leslie Brown Hofton (3 March 1888 – January 1971) was an English footballer who played as a full-back for Manchester United in two spells in the 1910s. Born in Sheffield, Hofton began his career at Kiveton Park, before moving to Glossop via Worksop Town and Denaby United in April 1908.

In July 1910, Hofton became Manchester United's first £1,000 signing, beating the previous club record of £700, which was spent on Alex Bell in 1903. However, despite his record price tag, it took Hofton seven months to make his United debut, appearing for the first time away to Newcastle United on 18 February 1911. He then left the club on a free transfer in May 1913. The First World War broke out just over a year later, but one year after its conclusion, in September 1919, Hofton re-signed for Manchester United. He continued to play for the club for two-and-a-half more years, amassing a total of 18 appearances for the club, before being sold to Denaby United in February 1922.
