= Tommy Bogan =

Scottish footballer (1920–1993)

Personal information
- Date of birth: 18 May 1920
- Place of birth: Glasgow, Scotland
- Date of death: 23 September 1993 (aged 73)
- Place of death: Alderley Edge, England
- Position: Outside right

Youth career
- Strathclyde
- Blantyre Celtic
- Renfrew

Senior career*
Years	Team	Apps	(Gls)
1943–1946	Hibernian	0	(0)
1946–1948	Celtic	34	(5)
1948–1949	Preston North End	11	(0)
1949–1951	Manchester United	29	(7)
1951	Aberdeen	4	(1)
1951–1953	Southampton	8	(2)
1953–1954	Blackburn Rovers	1	(0)
1954–1955	Macclesfield Town	27	(14)

International career
1948	Scottish Football League XI	1	(0)
1945	Scotland (wartime)	1	(0)
- * Club domestic league appearances and goals

Thomas Bogan (18 May 1920 – 23 September 1993) was a Scottish footballer, who played as a forward for several clubs in both Scotland and England. Born in Glasgow, Bogan played for Strathclyde, Blantyre Celtic, Renfrew and Hibernian before moving to Celtic after the end of the Second World War.

After two and a half years with Celtic, Bogan moved to England to play for Preston North End in September 1948. He played for Preston for one season, before moving to Manchester United in September 1949. However, it was apparent that Bogan had not adapted to the English game and moved back to Scotland to play for Aberdeen in March 1951. A move back to England soon followed, with Bogan moving to Southampton after just four appearances for Aberdeen. Again, though, he struggled to fit in and he moved to Blackburn Rovers and then Macclesfield Town before retiring from professional football.
