= Jimmy Pegg =

English footballer

Personal information
- Full name: James Kenneth Pegg
- Date of birth: 4 January 1926
- Place of birth: Salford, Lancashire, England
- Date of death: 25 August 1999 (aged 73)
- Place of death: Manchester, England
- Height: 6 ft 0 in (1.83 m)
- Position: Goalkeeper

Senior career*
Years	Team	Apps	(Gls)
1947–1949	Manchester United	2	(0)
1949–1950	Torquay United	2	(0)
1950	York City	1	(0)
Total		5	(0)
- * Club domestic league appearances and goals

James Kenneth Pegg (4 January 1926 – 25 August 1999) was an English professional footballer who played as a goalkeeper in the Football League for Manchester United, Torquay United and York City.
