= Berry Brown =

English footballer

Personal information
- Full name: Robert Beresford Brown
- Date of birth: 6 September 1927
- Place of birth: West Hartlepool, England
- Date of death: July 2001 (age 73)
- Height: 6 ft 1 in (1.85 m)
- Position: Goalkeeper

Youth career
- 1946: Manchester United

Senior career*
Years	Team	Apps	(Gls)
1946–1949	Manchester United	4	(0)
1949–1951	Doncaster Rovers	4	(0)
1951–1956	Hartlepools United	126	(0)
- * Club domestic league appearances and goals

Robert Beresford Brown (6 September 1927 – July 2001), known as Berry Brown, was an English footballer who played as a goalkeeper for Manchester United, Doncaster Rovers and Hartlepools United in the late 1940s and 1950s.

== Career ==
Born in West Hartlepool, County Durham, Brown signed for Manchester United as an 18-year-old in May 1946, just as football was getting going again after the Second World War. He turned professional three months later, in August 1946, but it was not until January 1948 that he made his debut for the club, saving a penalty in a 2–1 defeat away to Sheffield United on 31 January 1948. After making way for Jack Crompton, Brown returned to the first team for two successive away wins in March 1948, keeping clean sheets against both Huddersfield Town and Bolton Wanderers.

Brown had to wait until the following season to make his next appearance for the club, which also happened to be his last. In the only game missed by Jack Crompton during the 1948–49 season, Brown kept goal at home to Blackpool on 1 September 1948. However, he was unable to prevent the team from succumbing to a 4–3 defeat. He was transferred to Doncaster Rovers the following January.

In two-and-a-half seasons with Doncaster, Brown made just four appearances and he left for Hartlepools United – via Stockton – in August 1951. Berry was much more suited to football in the lower divisions and became Hartlepools United's regular goalkeeper; he made 126 league appearances for the club before retiring from football in June 1956, at the age of 28.
