= Ted Buckle =

English footballer

Personal information
- Full name: Herbert Edward William Buckle
- Date of birth: 28 October 1924
- Place of birth: Southwark, Greater London, England
- Date of death: 14 June 1990 (aged 65)
- Place of death: Manchester, England
- Position: Outside forward

Senior career*
Years	Team	Apps	(Gls)
1945–1949	Manchester United	20	(6)
1949–1955	Everton	97	(31)
1955–1957	Exeter City	65	(12)
1957–1958	Wigan Athletic	20	(11)
1958–?	Prestatyn	?	(?)
1961–1962	Dolgellau	?	(?)

Managerial career
- 1958–?: Prestatyn (player-manager)
- * Club domestic league appearances and goals

Herbert Edward William Buckle (28 October 1924 – 14 June 1990) was an English footballer who played as an outside forward for Manchester United, Everton and Exeter City in the late 1940s and 1950s. At the end of his career, he also had the role of player-manager at Prestatyn, and temporarily came out of retirement to play for Dolgellau in the 1961–62 season.

Born in Southwark, Greater London, Buckle joined the Royal Navy at the age of 18 and participated in the closing stages of the Second World War. While playing for the Navy football team, Buckle was spotted by Manchester United, who signed him on an amateur contract soon after the war ended. He turned professional a month later, and scored on his professional debut against Charlton Athletic on 4 January 1947. In his first season, he scored four goals in seven games, but with Jimmy Delaney and Charlie Mitten in the United side, Buckle remained a fringe player at the club and was transferred to Everton in November 1949.

He flourished at Everton, scoring 31 goals in 97 games over the span of a five-and-a-half-year career with the Toffees. In 1955, at the age of 30, Buckle was transferred to Exeter City, where he played as a first team regular for two seasons, making 65 appearances. He also spent one season at Wigan Athletic, scoring 11 goals in 20 Lancashire Combination appearances. He later took the post of player-manager at Prestatyn, but he retired not long after. However, he did come out of retirement for one season in 1961 to play for Dolgellau in the Welsh league.

Buckle died on 14 June 1990 at the age of 65.
