= Sammy Lynn =

English footballer

Personal information
- Full name: Samuel Lynn
- Date of birth: 25 December 1920
- Place of birth: St Helens, Lancashire, England
- Date of death: January 1995 (aged 74)
- Place of death: Salford, England
- Position: Wing half

Youth career
- 1935–1938: Manchester United

Senior career*
Years	Team	Apps	(Gls)
1938–1951	Manchester United	13	(0)
1951–1953	Bradford Park Avenue	73	(0)
- Wigan Athletic
- * Club domestic league appearances and goals

Samuel Lynn (25 December 1920 – January 1995) was an English footballer. His regular position was at wing half. He was born in St Helens, Lancashire. He played for Manchester United and Bradford Park Avenue in The Football League, and also played for Wigan Athletic in the Lancashire Combination.
