= Laurie Cassidy =

English footballer

Personal information
- Full name: Laurence Cassidy
- Date of birth: 10 March 1923
- Place of birth: Manchester, England
- Date of death: November 2010 (aged 87)
- Place of death: Stafford, England
- Position: Inside forward

Senior career*
Years	Team	Apps	(Gls)
1947–1956	Manchester United	4	(0)
1956–?	Oldham Athletic	4	(1)
- * Club domestic league appearances and goals

Laurence Cassidy (10 March 1923 – November 2010) was an English footballer who played as a forward.

== Career ==
Born in Manchester, he played for Manchester United and Oldham Athletic.

== Later life ==
Cassidy worked for Manchester United and also as a teacher, being headteacher of a primary school in Collyhurst and teaching future Manchester United players Nobby Stiles and Brian Kidd.
