= Ronnie Burke =

English footballer

Personal information
- Full name: Ronald Stewart Burke
- Date of birth: 13 August 1921
- Place of birth: Dormo, Redcar, England
- Date of death: December 2003 (aged 82)
- Place of death: Watford, England
- Position: Forward

Youth career
- St Albans City
- 1941–1946: Luton Town
- 1946: Manchester United

Senior career*
Years	Team	Apps	(Gls)
1946–1949	Manchester United	28	(16)
1949–1953	Huddersfield Town	27	(6)
1953–1955	Rotherham United	73	(56)
1955–1957	Exeter City	42	(14)
1957–1959	Tunbridge Wells United		
1959–1961	Biggleswade Town		
Total		170	(92)
- * Club domestic league appearances and goals

Ronald Stewart Burke (13 August 1921 – December 2003) was a footballer who played for Manchester United, Huddersfield Town, Rotherham United & Exeter City.

== Career ==
Rotherham United made several attempts to sign Ronnie Burke during the World War II years, but Manchester United got his signature. He made his debut for United against Sunderland on the 26 October 1946. Despite a great goals per game ratio (34 appearances and 22 goals) he was called upon infrequently due to the consistently good form of Morris, Rowley and Pearson. Frustrated by lack of first team opportunities and following a number of transfer requests he was allowed to leave. He then moved to Huddersfield Town, but suffered a serious knee injury, and lost his place in the Terriers team.

=== Rotherham ===
He made his debut for Rotherham in Division 2 (now Championship), scoring two goals in a 4–3 defeat at Nottingham Forest on Good Friday 1953, and was unlucky not to get a hat-trick in his first Millers appearance.

In the next season he scored a hat-trick in the Millers 5–2 victory over Derby County on 5 December 1953, and repeated his achievement in a 7-0 thrashing of Oldham Athletic in March 1954. He finished the 1953/54 season with 33 goals, and was second highest goalscorer in Division 2.

In the 1954/55 season he scored all four Millers goals in a 4–2 victory against Bury in September 1954, but his knee injury problems flared up again and he was made available for transfer in summer 1955.

=== Later clubs ===
He then moved to Exeter City. His career at Millmoor was very successful, but was cut short by injury. After this, he moved to non-League football, first in 1957 with Tunbridge Wells United then on to Biggleswade Town.
