= Allenby Chilton =

English footballer and manager

Personal information
- Date of birth: 16 September 1918
- Place of birth: South Hylton, England
- Date of death: 15 June 1996 (aged 77)
- Position: Centre-half

Youth career
- Hylton Colliery
- Seaham Colliery

Senior career*
Years	Team	Apps	(Gls)
1938	Liverpool	0	(0)
1938–1955	Manchester United	352	(3)
1955–1956	Grimsby Town	63	(0)
Total		415	(3)

International career
1950–1951	England	2	(0)

Managerial career
- 1955–1959: Grimsby Town
- 1960–1961: Wigan Athletic
- 1962–1963: Hartlepools United
- * Club domestic league appearances and goals

Allenby C. Chilton (16 September 1918 – 15 June 1996) was an English footballer.

== Playing career ==
Chilton started his career with Seaham Colliery before joining Liverpool as an amateur in the summer of 1938, but he never played a senior game for the Anfield club.

Chilton transferred to Manchester United soon after in November 1938 and made his first team debut against Charlton Athletic in September 1939. Chilton's early career was cut short by the Second World War although he made guest appearances for Airdrieonians, Cardiff City, Hartlepools United, Middlesbrough, Newcastle United and Charlton Athletic who he helped to win the War Cup South Final in 1944. He served in the Durham Light Infantry and saw active service in the Normandy Landings also in 1944.

Chilton established himself as a centre half in Matt Busby's first post-war team and helped United to triumph in the 1947–48 FA Cup and was a key member of the 1951–52 league championship winning team. He was made club captain during the 1953–54 season. Having missed just 13 games in nine seasons at United and with 175 consecutive appearances to his name, Chilton requested a rest from first team action in early 1955. He was replaced by Mark Jones, one of the rising Busby Babes, and never returned to first team action.

== Management career ==
=== Grimsby Town ===
He left the club in March 1955 to become player-manager with Grimsby Town. He joined the Mariners late in the 1954–55 season and was unable to stop them having to apply for re-election, but the following season under his management they were champions of Division Three North – the only club ever to go from re-election to promotion in one season.

=== Wigan Athletic ===
Chilton continued as manager at Grimsby Town until April 1959 when he joined Wigan Athletic as manager for one season during 1960–61.

=== Hartlepools United ===
Chilton joined Hartlepools United as a scout for the 1961–62 season and became manager during 1962–63.

== Honours ==
Manchester United

- FA Cup: 1947–48

Sporting positions
Preceded by Stan Pearson	Manchester United captain 1953–1955	Succeeded by Roger Byrne
