= Billy McGlen =

English footballer

Personal information
- Full name: William McGlen
- Date of birth: 27 April 1921
- Place of birth: Bedlington, Northumberland, England
- Date of death: 23 December 1999 (aged 78)
- Place of death: Lincolnshire, England
- Height: 5 ft 8 in (1.73 m)
- Position: Midfielder

Senior career*
Years	Team	Apps	(Gls)
1945-1946	Blyth Spartans		
1946-1952	Manchester United	122	(2)
1952-1952	Oldham Athletic	68	(3)
1953-1953	Lincoln City	14	
- * Club domestic league appearances and goals

William McGlen (27 April 1921 – 23 December 1999) was an English professional footballer who played as a wing half and midfielder. He played for Blyth Spartans, Manchester United, Oldham Athletic and Lincoln City. McGlen played 110 times in the Football League, scoring two goals. McGlen lived in Manchester for most of his life until retiring to Burgh le Marsh in Lincolnshire, where he died in December 1999 at the age of 78.

== Early life ==
McGlen was born in Bedlington, Northumberland on 27 April 1921. His father Daniel McGlen was a coal hewer. His mother was Mary Ann McGlen. He served an apprenticeship as a bricklayer.

== Career ==
During World War II, McGlen served in the Royal Air Force, and was spotted by Manchester United scouts whilst playing football for his division in Italy. On returning to the UK in 1946, he signed as a professional with Manchester United, the second signing of new manager Matt Busby. He married his wife Dorothy in 1948 and they had a daughter in 1949, who was also called Dorothy.

McGlen stayed with United until July 1952, when he was sold to Lincoln City for £8,000. He earned the nickname "Killer" McGlen in his career. He spent three seasons at Oldham Athletic, making 68 appearances, winning the Third Division North title, before signing to Lincoln City, where he spent one season, making 14 appearances. Whilst in Oldham his second daughter, Janet was born. He retired from professional football in 1956, when he returned to Lincoln City as a trainer in 1957 before becoming manager of Skegness Town. He moved back to Manchester after leaving Lincoln but returned to live in Lincolnshire where he spent his retirement and died.

== Archived Interview ==
Broadcast interview of McGlen speaking about Matt Busby in January 1994 shortly after his death.
