= Johnny Morris (footballer) =

English footballer

Personal information
- Full name: John Morris
- Date of birth: 27 September 1923
- Place of birth: Radcliffe, England
- Date of death: 6 April 2011 (aged 87)
- Place of death: Manchester, England
- Position: Inside forward

Youth career
- 1939–1941: Manchester United

Senior career*
Years	Team	Apps	(Gls)
1941–1949	Manchester United	83	(32)
1949–1952	Derby County	130	(44)
1952–1958	Leicester City	206	(33)
1958–1961	Corby Town	?	(?)
1961–1962	Kettering Town	37	(14)
Total		456	(123)

International career
1949	England	3	(3)

Managerial career
- 1958–1961: Corby Town (player-manager)
- 1962–1964: Rugby Town
- 1964–1967: Great Harwood
- 1967–1969: Oswestry Town
- * Club domestic league appearances and goals

John Morris (27 September 1923 – 6 April 2011) was an English footballer who played as an inside forward in the Football League for Manchester United, Derby County and Leicester City.

== Career ==
Morris was born in Radcliffe, Lancashire. He started his career as a trainee with Manchester United in 1939, and turned professional in 1941. He guested for clubs including Bolton Wanderers, Charlton Athletic, Wrexham, and Everton during the Second World War, and made his debut for Manchester United on 26 October 1946 in a 3–0 home win against Sunderland in the First Division. He helped the club win the 1948 FA Cup, then, after scoring 35 goals from 93 appearances in all competitions, he was transferred to Derby County in March 1949 for a world record fee of £24,000. After three seasons at Derby, he finished his League career with Leicester City, where he made more than 200 appearances, and then became player-manager of non-league club Corby Town.

Morris was capped three times for England. He scored on his debut, on 18 May 1949 in a 4–1 win against Norway, and scored twice in his second game four days later against France.

== Later life and death ==
Morris continued to attend functions for the Former Players' Association of Derby County and also played golf regularly into his 80s. He died on 6 April 2011 in a Manchester Nursing home at the age of 87. He was survived by his wife Marian and his two sons, and outlived his only daughter.

== Honours ==
Manchester United

- FA Cup: 1947–48
