= Jimmy Delaney =

Scottish footballer and manager

Personal information
- Full name: James Delaney
- Date of birth: 3 September 1914
- Place of birth: Cleland, Scotland
- Date of death: 26 September 1989 (aged 75)
- Place of death: Cleland, Scotland
- Position: Outside right

Youth career
- St Mary's

Senior career*
Years	Team	Apps	(Gls)
1933	Stoneyburn Juniors		
1933–1946	Celtic	143	(68)
1946–1950	Manchester United	164	(25)
1950–1951	Aberdeen	31	(7)
1951–1954	Falkirk	40	(20)
1954–1955	Derry City		
1955–1956	Cork Athletic	14	(4)
1956–1957	Elgin City		
Total		392	(124)

International career
1935–1948	Scotland	15	(6)
1936–1939	Scottish League XI	6	(3)
1944–1946	Scotland (wartime)	3	(2)

Managerial career
- 1955–1956: Cork Athletic
- * Club domestic league appearances and goals

James Delaney (3 September 1914 – 26 September 1989) was a Scottish footballer who played as an outside right. He had a 24-year playing career interrupted by World War II, his longest spells at club level were spent with Celtic in Scotland and Manchester United in England. He was capped 15 times for the Scotland national team, scoring six goals.

== Career ==
=== Club ===
==== Celtic ====
Delaney joined Celtic on provisional forms in 1933 from Stoneyburn Juniors, signing a permanent contract the following year. Delaney suffered the misfortune of a badly broken arm in a home game against Arbroath in April 1939. The injury sustained being further exacerbated by the opposition player Attilio Becchi (who was apparently a Celtic fan) accidentally stepping on Delaney's arm. Delaney's torn football shirt was sold at auction for £564 in 2002. He spent 13 years with the Glasgow club, making 327 appearances in all competitions including wartime tournaments.

==== Manchester United ====
Delaney was held in high regard as a player by Matt Busby who, when the war ended in 1946, signed him for Manchester United in a £4,000 deal. Delaney helped United win the 1948 FA Cup Final and finished his United career with 28 goals from 184 total appearances.

==== Late career in Scotland and Ireland ====
He moved back to Scotland at the age of 36, joining Aberdeen in November 1950 and made his Dons debut in a 5–1 defeat of Falkirk. A year later he joined the Bairns, where he spent three seasons. In January 1954, Derry City paid £1,500 to sign him, a record fee for the Irish Football League, remarkable in that he was by this stage 39 years old. Two years later he joined Cork Athletic as player-manager before eventually retiring after a season with Highland League Elgin City in 1957.

Delaney has the distinction of having won the Scottish Cup with Celtic in 1937, the English FA Cup with Manchester United in 1948, and the Irish Cup with Derry City in 1954. He also came close to a fourth different national trophy in the Republic of Ireland, earning a FAI Cup runners-up medal with Cork Athletic in 1956.

=== International ===
Delaney won 15 caps for Scotland and scored six goals. He also represented the Scottish League XI six times. On 15 November 2009, he was inducted into the Scottish Football Hall of Fame.

== Personal life ==
Son of Patrick Delaney and Bridget Nash from Crettyard, Queen's County (now County Laois) in Ireland, Jimmy was born in Cleland, North Lanarkshire. His son Pat Delaney was also a footballer whose longest spell was with Motherwell, and his grandson John Kennedy played as a defender for Celtic, Norwich City and Scotland.

Delaney died in September 1989.

== Honours ==
Celtic

- Scottish Division One: 1935–36, 1937–38
- Scottish Cup: 1936–37
- Empire Exhibition Trophy: 1938
- Glasgow Cup: 1938–39

Manchester United

- FA Cup: 1947–48

Falkirk

- Scottish Division Two promotion: 1951–52

Derry City

- IFA Cup: 1953–54
- North West Senior Cup: 1953–54

Scotland

- British Home Championship: 1935–36, 1938–39 (shared)

Individual

- Ulster Footballer of the Year: 1953–54
- Scottish Football Hall of Fame: 2009
