= Jack Crompton =

English footballer (1921–2013)

Personal information
- Full name: John Crompton
- Date of birth: 18 December 1921
- Place of birth: Hulme, Manchester, England
- Date of death: 4 July 2013 (aged 91)
- Place of death: Oldham, England
- Height: 1.75 m (5 ft 9 in)
- Position: Goalkeeper

Youth career
- Newton Heath Loco
- Gosling's
- 1942–1944: Oldham Athletic
- 1944: Manchester City
- 1944–1945: Manchester United

Senior career*
Years	Team	Apps	(Gls)
1945–1956	Manchester United	191	(0)
1944–1945	Stockport County (guest)		

Managerial career
- 1958–1962: Manchester United (assistant)
- 1962: Luton Town
- 1962–1971: Manchester United (assistant)
- 1971–1972: Barrow
- * Club domestic league appearances and goals

John Crompton (18 December 1921 – 4 July 2013) was an English professional footballer. Born in Hulme, Manchester, Lancashire, he was a goalkeeper for Manchester United between 1944 and 1956. He was part of the team that won the FA Cup in 1948 and the league title in 1952. During the Second World War, he played as a guest for Stockport County.

After his retirement from playing at the end of the 1955–56 season, Crompton was hired as a trainer by Luton Town, before returning to Manchester United in the wake of the Munich air disaster two years later. Luton rehired him as their manager in 1962 as a replacement for the departing Sam Bartram, but his tenure lasted just seven days and he returned to his position at Manchester United. In 1971, Crompton was named as manager of Barrow, replacing Don McEvoy, but he only lasted until the end of the season and in June 1972, he was hired by Bury as a coach. In 1973, Crompton joined Preston North End as part of fellow former Manchester United man Bobby Charlton's coaching staff. After a year with Preston, Crompton made his final return to Manchester United to take charge of the club's reserve team, a position he held for seven years before ultimately retiring from the game.

As one of the last surviving members of the 1948 FA Cup-winning team going into the 21st century, Crompton was often invited to events commemorating the club's history, including the opening of an exhibit in the club museum marking the 100th anniversary of Old Trafford. He was also president of Curzon Ashton, who in 2012 played in a friendly against a Manchester United reserve XI for the "Jack Crompton Trophy".

Crompton died on 4 July 2013, aged 91.

== Honours ==
Manchester United

- Football League First Division: 1951–52, 1955–56
- FA Cup: 1947–48
