= Stan Pearson =

English footballer (1919–1997)

Personal information
- Full name: Stanley Clare Pearson
- Date of birth: 11 January 1919
- Place of birth: Salford, England
- Date of death: 20 February 1997 (aged 78)
- Place of death: Alderley Edge, England
- Height: 5 ft 9 in (1.75 m)
- Position: Inside forward

Youth career
- 1935–1937: Manchester United

Senior career*
Years	Team	Apps	(Gls)
1936–1954	Manchester United	312	(127)
1954–1957	Bury	121	(56)
1957–1959	Chester	57	(16)
Total		490	(199)

International career
1948–1952	England	8	(5)

Managerial career
- 1959–1961: Chester
- * Club domestic league appearances and goals

Stanley Clare Pearson (11 January 1919 – 20 February 1997) was an English footballer.

Born in Salford, Lancashire, Pearson was signed by Manchester United as an amateur in December 1935 and turned professional in May 1937. His first senior game came against Chesterfield in 1937. When his career was interrupted by the Second World War, he served with the 2nd/4th Lancashires. He helped United win the 1948 FA Cup (scoring in the final) and 1952 league championship. He retired in 1953 with 148 career goals (good for 9th in team history) in 343 appearances; just two goals behind Ruud van Nistelrooy. During his time at Manchester United, he scored five hat-tricks; four in the league and one in the FA Cup. His first came in a 5–0 victory over Liverpool in 1946, and in the 1948 FA Cup semi-final he scored all the goals when United won 3–1 against Derby County at Hillsborough in Sheffield. His hat-trick against Liverpool in September 1946 occurred at Maine Road (due to bomb damage to Old Trafford), and would be the last hat-trick by a Manchester United player against the Anfield club until September 2010, when Bulgarian Dimitar Berbatov scored all three of United's goals in a 3–2 league win at Old Trafford.

Pearson went on to average more than one goal every two games in three years at Bury before his playing career ended with two years at Chester from 1957 to 1959. At 40 years, 101 days, Pearson remains the oldest player to make a Football League appearance for the club when he played his final match against Crewe Alexandra on 22 April 1959.

Upon his retirement, Pearson was a popular appointment as Chester manager after John Harris moved to Sheffield United. Despite making signings such as his former Manchester United colleague Frank Clempson, Chester struggled during Pearson's reign in charge. After finishing 20th and 24th in successive Division Four seasons, Pearson left the club following a 1–0 home defeat to non-league Morecambe in November 1961 in the FA Cup.

After retiring from football Pearson became sub-postmaster of Prestbury Post Office in Cheshire. He died at Alderley Edge, Cheshire, in February 1997, aged 78.

== Honours ==
Manchester United

- FA Cup: 1947–48
