= 1978–79 Manchester United F.C. season =

English football club season

Manchester United
1978–79 season
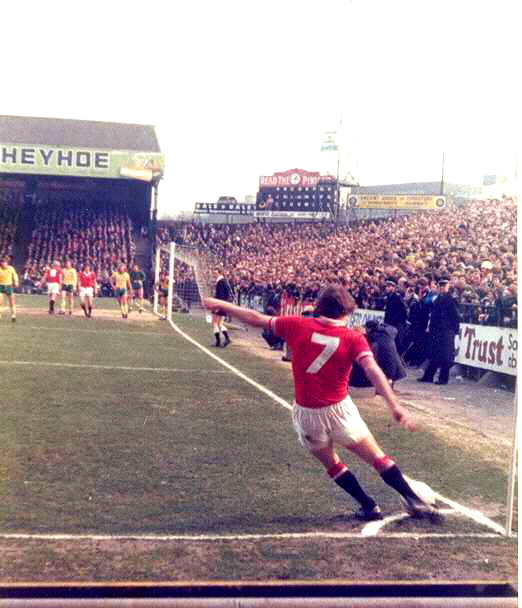
- Steve Coppell taking a corner against Norwich City, 7 April 1979
- Chairman: Louis Edwards
- Manager: Dave Sexton
- First Division: 9th
- FA Cup: Runners-up
- League Cup: Third Round
- Top goalscorer: League: Steve Coppell (11); Jimmy Greenhoff (11); All: Jimmy Greenhoff (17)
- Highest home attendance: 56,139 vs Birmingham City (19 August 1978)
- Lowest home attendance: 33,678 vs Norwich City (25 April 1979)
- Average home league attendance: 46,164
Home colours	Away colours	Third colours

The 1978–79 season was Manchester United's 77th season in the Football League, and their fourth consecutive season in the top division of English football. They finished the season ninth in the league, but were more successful in the FA Cup, reaching the final where they lost 3–2 to Arsenal at Wembley, conceding a late goal from Alan Sunderland in the final minute of the game after coming from 2–0 down make it 2–2 in the closing minutes of the game.

== First Division ==
Date	Opponents	H / A	Result F–A	Scorers	Attendance
19 August 1978	Birmingham City	H	1–0	Jordan	56,139
23 August 1978	Leeds United	A	3–2	Macari, McIlroy, McQueen	36,845
26 August 1978	Ipswich Town	A	0–3		21,802
2 September 1978	Everton	H	1–1	Buchan	53,982
9 September 1978	Queens Park Rangers	A	1–1	J. Greenhoff	23,477
16 September 1978	Nottingham Forest	H	1–1	J. Greenhoff	53,039
23 September 1978	Arsenal	A	1–1	Coppell	45,393
30 September 1978	Manchester City	H	1–0	Jordan	55,301
7 October 1978	Middlesbrough	H	3–2	Macari (2), Jordan	45,402
14 October 1978	Aston Villa	A	2–2	Macari, McIlroy	36,204
21 October 1978	Bristol City	H	1–3	J. Greenhoff	47,211
28 October 1978	Wolverhampton Wanderers	A	4–2	J. Greenhoff (2), B. Greenhoff, Jordan	23,141
4 November 1978	Southampton	H	1–1	J. Greenhoff	46,259
11 November 1978	Birmingham City	A	1–5	Jordan	23,550
18 November 1978	Ipswich Town	H	2–0	Coppell, J. Greenhoff	42,109
21 November 1978	Everton	A	0–3		42,126
25 November 1978	Chelsea	A	1–0	J. Greenhoff	28,162
9 December 1978	Derby County	A	3–1	Ritchie (2), J. Greenhoff	23,180
16 December 1978	Tottenham Hotspur	H	2–0	McIlroy, Ritchie	52,026
22 December 1978	Bolton Wanderers	A	0–3		32,390
26 December 1978	Liverpool	H	0–3		54,910
30 December 1978	West Bromwich Albion	H	3–5	B. Greenhoff, McIlroy, McQueen	45,091
3 February 1979	Arsenal	H	0–2		45,460
10 February 1979	Manchester City	A	3–0	Coppell (2), Ritchie	46,151
24 February 1979	Aston Villa	H	1–1	J. Greenhoff	44,437
28 February 1979	Queens Park Rangers	H	2–0	Coppell, J. Greenhoff	36,085
3 March 1979	Bristol City	A	2–1	McQueen, Ritchie	24,583
20 March 1979	Coventry City	A	3–4	Coppell (2), McIlroy	25,382
24 March 1979	Leeds United	H	4–1	Ritchie (3), Thomas	51,191
27 March 1979	Middlesbrough	A	2–2	Coppell, McQueen	20,138
7 April 1979	Norwich City	A	2–2	Macari, McQueen	19,382
11 April 1979	Bolton Wanderers	H	1–2	Buchan	49,617
14 April 1979	Liverpool	A	0–2		46,608
16 April 1979	Coventry City	H	0–0		43,035
18 April 1979	Nottingham Forest	A	1–1	Jordan	33,074
21 April 1979	Tottenham Hotspur	A	1–1	McQueen	36,665
25 April 1979	Norwich City	H	1–0	Macari	33,678
28 April 1979	Derby County	H	0–0		42,546
30 April 1979	Southampton	A	1–1	Ritchie	21,616
5 May 1979	West Bromwich Albion	A	0–1		27,960
7 May 1979	Wolverhampton Wanderers	H	3–2	Coppell (2), Ritchie	39,402
16 May 1979	Chelsea	H	1–1	Coppell	38,109

Pos	Team	Pld	W	D	L	GF	GA	GD	Pts	Qualification or relegation
7	Arsenal	42	17	14	11	61	48	+13	48	Qualification for the European Cup Winners' Cup first round (Note: Arsenal qualified for the European Cup Winners' Cup first round as the 1978–79 FA Cup winners.)
8	Aston Villa	42	15	16	11	59	49	+10	46	
9	Manchester United	42	15	15	12	60	63	−3	45	
10	Coventry City	42	14	16	12	58	68	−10	44	
11	Tottenham Hotspur	42	13	15	14	48	61	−13	41	

Source: World Football
Rules for classification: 1) Points; 2) Goal difference; 3) Goals scored

== FA Cup ==
Date	Round	Opponents	H / A	Result F–A	Scorers	Attendance
15 January 1979	Round 3	Chelsea	H	3–0	Coppell, J. Greenhoff, Grimes	38,743
31 January 1979	Round 4	Fulham	A	1–1	J. Greenhoff	25,229
12 February 1979	Round 4 Replay	Fulham	H	1–0	J. Greenhoff	41,200
20 February 1979	Round 5	Colchester United	A	1–0	J. Greenhoff	13,171
10 March 1979	Round 6	Tottenham Hotspur	A	1–1	Thomas	51,800
14 March 1979	Round 6 Replay	Tottenham Hotspur	H	2–0	McIlroy, Jordan	55,584
31 March 1979	Semi-Final	Liverpool	N	2–2	Jordan, B. Greenhoff	52,524
4 April 1979	Semi-Final; Replay	Liverpool	N	1–0	J. Greenhoff	53,069
12 May 1979	Final	Arsenal	N	2–3	McQueen, McIlroy	100,000

== League Cup ==
Date	Round	Opponents	H / A	Result F–A	Scorers	Attendance
30 August 1978	Round 2	Stockport County	H	3–2	McIlroy, J. Greenhoff, Jordan	41,761
4 October 1978	Round 3	Watford	H	1–2	Jordan	40,534

== Squad statistics ==
Pos.	Name	League		FA Cup		League Cup		Total	
Pos.	Name	Apps	Goals	Apps	Goals	Apps	Goals	Apps	Goals
GK	(England) Gary Bailey	28	0	9	0	0	0	37	0
GK	(Republic of Ireland) Paddy Roche	14	0	0	0	2	0	16	0
DF	(Scotland) Arthur Albiston	32(1)	0	7	0	2	0	41(1)	0
DF	(Scotland) Martin Buchan	37	2	9	0	2	0	48	2
DF	(Northern Ireland) Tom Connell	2	0	0	0	0	0	2	0
DF	(Scotland) Stewart Houston	21(1)	0	2	0	1	0	24(1)	0
DF	(Scotland) Gordon McQueen	36	6	9	1	2	0	47	7
DF	(Republic of Ireland) Kevin Moran	1	0	0	0	0	0	1	0
DF	(Northern Ireland) Jimmy Nicholl	19(2)	0	6(2)	0	0	0	25(4)	0
DF	(Scotland) Steve Paterson	1(2)	0	0	0	0	0	1(2)	0
MF	(England) Steve Coppell	42	11	9	1	2	0	53	12
MF	(England) Brian Greenhoff	32(1)	2	5	1	2	0	39(1)	3
MF	(Republic of Ireland) Ashley Grimes	5(11)	0	3	1	2	0	10(11)	1
MF	(Scotland) Lou Macari	31(1)	6	5	0	1	0	37(1)	6
MF	(Northern Ireland) David McCreery	14(1)	0	0	0	0(1)	0	14(2)	0
MF	(Northern Ireland) Chris McGrath	0(2)	0	0	0	0	0	0(2)	0
MF	(Northern Ireland) Sammy McIlroy	40	5	9	2	2	1	51	8
MF	(Northern Ireland) Tom Sloan	3(1)	0	0	0	0	0	3(1)	0
MF	(Wales) Mickey Thomas	25	1	8	1	0	0	33	2
FW	(England) Jimmy Greenhoff	33	11	9	5	2	1	44	17
FW	(Scotland) Joe Jordan	30	6	4(1)	2	2	2	36(1)	10
FW	(England) Stuart Pearson	0	0	2	0	0	0	2	0
FW	(England) Andy Ritchie	16(1)	10	3(1)	0	0	0	19(2)	10
