= 1980–81 Manchester United F.C. season =

English football club season

Manchester United
1980–81 season
- Chairman: Martin Edwards
- Manager: Dave Sexton
- First Division: 8th
- FA Cup: Fourth round
- League Cup: Second round
- UEFA Cup: First round
- Top goalscorer: League: Joe Jordan (15); All: Joe Jordan (15)
- Highest home attendance: 57,049 vs Liverpool (26 December 1980)
- Lowest home attendance: 31,656 vs Coventry City (27 August 1980)
- Average home league attendance: 44,099
Home colours	Away colours	Third colours

The 1980–81 season was Manchester United's 79th season in the Football League, and their 6th consecutive season in the top division of English football. It was the last of their four seasons under the management of Dave Sexton, who was sacked after the end of the season after failing to win the club a major trophy. The likes of Lawrie McMenemy, Brian Clough, Bobby Robson and Ron Saunders were all linked with the job, before Sexton was succeeded by West Bromwich Albion manager Ron Atkinson.

The club also paid a club record of more than £1 million for Nottingham Forest striker Garry Birtles, but the player was a huge disappointment and ended the season with just one goal from 28 appearances. The club's top scorer was Joe Jordan, who found the back of the net 15 times.

United were indeed one of the hardest teams to beat in the First Division this season, losing just nine out of 42 games and winning their final seven, but they were also held to a draw on 18 occasions. This restricted them to eighth-place finish.

== First Division ==
Date	Opponents	H / A	Result F–A	Scorers	Attendance
16 August 1980	Middlesbrough	H	3–0	Macari, Grimes, Thomas	54,394
19 August 1980	Wolverhampton Wanderers	A	0–1		31,955
23 August 1980	Birmingham City	A	0–0		28,661
30 August 1980	Sunderland	H	1–1	Jovanović	51,498
6 September 1980	Tottenham Hotspur	A	0–0		40,995
13 September 1980	Leicester City	H	5–0	Coppell, Grimes, Jovanović (2), Macari	43,229
20 September 1980	Leeds United	A	0–0		32,539
27 September 1980	Manchester City	H	2–2	Coppell, Albiston	55,918
4 October 1980	Nottingham Forest	A	2–1	Macari, Coppell	29,801
8 October 1980	Aston Villa	H	3–3	McIlroy (2; 1 pen.), Coppell	38,831
11 October 1980	Arsenal	H	0–0		49,036
18 October 1980	Ipswich Town	A	1–1	McIlroy (pen.)	28,572
22 October 1980	Stoke City	A	2–1	Jordan, Macari	24,534
25 October 1980	Everton	H	2–0	Jordan, Coppell	54,260
1 November 1980	Crystal Palace	A	0–1		31,449
8 November 1980	Coventry City	H	0–0		42,794
12 November 1980	Wolverhampton Wanderers	H	0–0		37,959
15 November 1980	Middlesbrough	A	1–1	Jordan	20,606
22 November 1980	Brighton & Hove Albion	A	4–1	Jordan (2), McIlroy, Duxbury	23,923
29 November 1980	Southampton	H	1–1	Jordan	47,783
6 December 1980	Norwich City	A	2–2	Bond (o.g.), Coppell	18,780
13 December 1980	Stoke City	H	2–2	Macari, Jordan	39,568
20 December 1980	Arsenal	A	1–2	Macari	33,730
26 December 1980	Liverpool	H	0–0		57,049
27 December 1980	West Bromwich Albion	A	1–3	Jovanović	38,615
10 January 1981	Brighton & Hove Albion	H	2–1	McQueen, Macari	42,208
28 January 1981	Sunderland	A	0–2		31,910
31 January 1981	Birmingham City	H	2–0	Jordan, Macari	39,081
7 February 1981	Leicester City	A	0–1		26,085
17 February 1981	Tottenham Hotspur	H	0–0		40,642
21 February 1981	Manchester City	A	0–1		50,114
28 February 1981	Leeds United	H	0–1		45,733
7 March 1981	Southampton	A	0–1		22,698
14 March 1981	Aston Villa	A	3–3	Jordan (2), McIlroy (pen.)	42,182
18 March 1981	Nottingham Forest	H	1–1	Burns (o.g.)	38,205
21 March 1981	Ipswich Town	H	2–1	Thomas, Nicholl	46,685
28 March 1981	Everton	A	1–0	Jordan	25,856
4 April 1981	Crystal Palace	H	1–0	Duxbury	37,954
11 April 1981	Coventry City	A	2–0	Jordan (2)	20,201
14 April 1981	Liverpool	A	1–0	McQueen	31,276
18 April 1981	West Bromwich Albion	H	2–1	Jordan, Macari	44,442
25 April 1981	Norwich City	H	1–0	Jordan	40,165

Pos	Team	Pld	W	D	L	GF	GA	GD	Pts	Qualification or relegation
6	Southampton	42	20	10	12	76	56	+20	50	Qualification for the UEFA Cup first round
7	Nottingham Forest	42	19	12	11	62	44	+18	50	
8	Manchester United	42	15	18	9	51	36	+15	48	
9	Leeds United	42	17	10	15	39	47	−8	44	
10	Tottenham Hotspur	42	14	15	13	70	68	+2	43	Qualification for the European Cup Winners' Cup first round (Note: Tottenham Hotspur qualified for the European Cup Winners' Cup first round as the 1980–81 FA Cup winners.)

Source: World Football
Rules for classification: 1) Points; 2) Goal difference; 3) Goals scored

== FA Cup ==
Date	Round	Opponents	H / A	Result F–A	Scorers	Attendance
3 January 1981	Round 3	Brighton & Hove Albion	H	2–2	Duxbury, Thomas	42,199
7 January 1981	Round 3 Replay	Brighton & Hove Albion	A	2–0	Nicholl, Birtles	26,915
24 January 1981	Round 4	Nottingham Forest	A	0–1		34,110

== League Cup ==
Date	Round	Opponents	H / A	Result F–A	Scorers	Attendance
27 August 1980	Round 2 First leg	Coventry City	H	0–1		31,656
2 September 1980	Round 2 Second leg	Coventry City	A	0–1		18,946

== UEFA Cup ==
Date	Round	Opponents	H / A	Result F–A	Scorers	Attendance
17 September 1980	Round 1 First leg	Widzew Łódź	H	1–1	McIlroy	38,037
1 October 1980	Round 1 Second leg	Widzew Łódź	A	0–0		40,000

== Squad statistics ==
Pos.	Name	League		FA Cup		League Cup		UEFA Cup		Total	
Pos.	Name	Apps	Goals	Apps	Goals	Apps	Goals	Apps	Goals	Apps	Goals
GK	(England) Gary Bailey	40	0	3	0	2	0	2	0	47	0
GK	(Republic of Ireland) Paddy Roche	2	0	0	0	0	0	0	0	2	0
DF	(Scotland) Arthur Albiston	42	1	3	0	2	0	2	0	49	1
DF	(Scotland) Martin Buchan	26	0	2	0	2	0	2	0	32	0
DF	(England) Mike Duxbury	27(6)	2	0(2)	1	0	0	1(1)	0	28(9)	3
DF	(Socialist Federal Republic of Yugoslavia) Nikola Jovanović	19	4	1	0	2	0	2	0	24	4
DF	(Scotland) Gordon McQueen	11	2	2	0	0	0	0	0	13	2
DF	(Republic of Ireland) Kevin Moran	32	0	1	0	0	0	0(1)	0	33(1)	0
DF	(Northern Ireland) Jimmy Nicholl	36	1	3	1	2	0	2	0	43	2
DF	(Republic of Ireland) Anthony Whelan	0(1)	0	0	0	0	0	0	0	0(1)	0
MF	(England) Steve Coppell	42	6	3	0	2	0	2	0	49	6
MF	(Republic of Ireland) Ashley Grimes	6(2)	2	0	0	0	0	2	0	8(2)	2
MF	(Scotland) Lou Macari	37(1)	9	3	0	2	0	1	0	43(1)	9
MF	(Northern Ireland) Chris McGrath	1	0	0	0	0	0	0	0	1	0
MF	(Northern Ireland) Sammy McIlroy	31(1)	5	1	0	2	0	2	1	36(1)	6
MF	(Northern Ireland) Tom Sloan	0(2)	0	0	0	0(1)	0	0	0	0(3)	0
MF	(Wales) Mickey Thomas	30	2	3	1	2	0	2	0	37	3
MF	(England) Ray Wilkins	11(2)	0	2	0	0	0	0	0	13(2)	0
FW	(England) Garry Birtles	25	0	3	1	0	0	0	0	28	1
FW	(England) Jimmy Greenhoff	8(1)	0	0	0	2	0	1	0	11(1)	0
FW	(Scotland) Joe Jordan	33	15	3	0	0	0	1	0	37	15
FW	(Scotland) Scott McGarvey	0(2)	0	0	0	0	0	0	0	0(2)	0
FW	(England) Andy Ritchie	3(1)	0	0	0	2	0	0	0	5(1)	0
