= 1977–78 Manchester United F.C. season =

English football club season

Manchester United
1977–78 season
- Chairman: Louis Edwards
- Manager: Dave Sexton
- First Division: 10th
- FA Cup: Fourth Round
- League Cup: Second Round
- Cup Winners' Cup: Second Round
- Charity Shield: Shared
- Top goalscorer: League: Gordon Hill (17); All: Gordon Hill (19)
- Highest home attendance: 58,398 vs Manchester City (15 March 1978)
- Lowest home attendance: 31,634 vs Saint-Étienne (5 October 1977)
- Average home league attendance: 51,349
Home colours	Away colours	Third colours

The 1977–78 season was Manchester United's 76th season in the Football League, and their third consecutive season in the top division of English football. It was their first season under the management of Dave Sexton, following the dismissal of Tommy Docherty in the close season after he made public his love affair with the wife of the club's physiotherapist. As FA Cup holders they contested the Charity Shield and were joint holders with league champions Liverpool, but failed to make an impact in Europe or on either of the domestic cups and finished only 10th in the league – lower than in either of their previous two seasons since promotion.

They were in fact expelled from the Cup Winners' Cup after their fans ran riot in France after the first leg of their first round tie with Saint-Etienne; they were reinstated to the competition on appeal but had to play the return leg at a neutral venue.

Winger Gordon Hill, who was transferred to Derby County (then managed by Tommy Docherty) at the end of the season, bowed out of Old Trafford in style as the club's top scorer once again with 17 goals in the league and 19 in all competitions.

== FA Charity Shield ==
Date	Opponents	H / A	Result F–A	Scorers	Attendance
13 August 1977	Liverpool	N	0–0		82,000

== First Division ==
Date	Opponents	H / A	Result F–A	Scorers	Attendance
20 August 1977	Birmingham City	A	4–1	Macari (3), Hill	28,005
24 August 1977	Coventry City	H	2–1	Hill, McCreery	55,726
27 August 1977	Ipswich Town	H	0–0		57,904
3 September 1977	Derby County	A	1–0	Macari	21,279
10 September 1977	Manchester City	A	1–3	Nicholl	50,856
17 September 1977	Chelsea	H	0–1		54,951
24 September 1977	Leeds United	A	1–1	Hill	33,517
1 October 1977	Liverpool	H	2–0	Macari, McIlroy	55,089
8 October 1977	Middlesbrough	A	1–2	Coppell	26,882
15 October 1977	Newcastle United	H	3–2	Coppell, J. Greenhoff, Macari	55,056
22 October 1977	West Bromwich Albion	A	0–4		27,526
29 October 1977	Aston Villa	A	1–2	Nicholl	39,144
5 November 1977	Arsenal	H	1–2	Hill	53,055
12 November 1977	Nottingham Forest	A	1–2	Pearson	30,183
19 November 1977	Norwich City	H	1–0	Pearson	48,729
26 November 1977	Queens Park Rangers	A	2–2	Hill (2)	25,367
3 December 1977	Wolverhampton Wanderers	H	3–1	J. Greenhoff, McIlroy, Pearson	48,874
10 December 1977	West Ham United	A	1–2	McGrath	20,242
17 December 1977	Nottingham Forest	H	0–4		54,374
26 December 1977	Everton	A	6–2	J. Greenhoff (2), Coppell, Hill, Macari, McIlroy	48,335
27 December 1977	Leicester City	H	3–1	Coppell, J. Greenhoff, Hill	57,396
31 December 1977	Coventry City	A	0–3		24,706
2 January 1978	Birmingham City	H	1–2	J. Greenhoff	53,501
14 January 1978	Ipswich Town	A	2–1	McIlroy, Pearson	23,321
21 January 1978	Derby County	H	4–0	Hill (2), Buchan, Pearson	57,115
8 February 1978	Bristol City	H	1–1	Hill	43,457
11 February 1978	Chelsea	A	2–2	Hill, McIlroy	32,849
25 February 1978	Liverpool	A	1–3	McIlroy	49,095
1 March 1978	Leeds United	H	0–1		49,101
4 March 1978	Middlesbrough	H	0–0		46,322
11 March 1978	Newcastle United	A	2–2	Hill, Jordan	25,825
15 March 1978	Manchester City	H	2–2	Hill (2)	58,398
18 March 1978	West Bromwich Albion	H	1–1	McQueen	46,329
25 March 1978	Leicester City	A	3–2	J. Greenhoff, Hill, Pearson	20,299
27 March 1978	Everton	H	1–2	Hill	55,277
29 March 1978	Aston Villa	H	1–1	McIlroy	41,625
1 April 1978	Arsenal	A	1–3	Jordan	40,829
8 April 1978	Queens Park Rangers	H	3–1	Pearson (2), Grimes	42,677
15 April 1978	Norwich City	A	3–1	Coppell, Jordan, McIlroy	19,778
22 April 1978	West Ham United	H	3–0	Grimes, McIlroy, Pearson	54,089
25 April 1978	Bristol City	A	1–0	Pearson	26,035
29 April 1978	Wolverhampton Wanderers	A	1–2	B. Greenhoff	24,774

Pos	Team	Pld	W	D	L	GF	GA	GD	Pts
8	Aston Villa	42	18	10	14	57	42	+15	46
9	Leeds United	42	18	10	14	63	53	+10	46
10	Manchester United	42	16	10	16	67	63	+4	42
11	Birmingham City	42	16	9	17	55	60	−5	41
12	Derby County	42	14	13	15	54	59	−5	41

Source: World Football
Rules for classification: 1) Points; 2) Goal difference; 3) Goals scored

== FA Cup ==
Date	Round	Opponents	H / A	Result F–A	Scorers	Attendance
7 January 1978	Round 3	Carlisle United	A	1–1	Macari	21,710
11 January 1978	Round 3 Replay	Carlisle United	H	4–2	Macari (2), Pearson (2)	54,156
28 January 1978	Round 4	West Bromwich Albion	H	1–1	Coppell	57,056
1 February 1978	Round 4 Replay	West Bromwich Albion	A	2–3	Hill, Pearson	37,086

== League Cup ==
Date	Round	Opponents	H / A	Result F–A	Scorers	Attendance
30 August 1977	Round 2	Arsenal	A	2–3	McCreery, Pearson	36,171

== Cup Winners' Cup ==
Date	Round	Opponents	H / A	Result F–A	Scorers	Attendance
14 September 1977	Round 1 First leg	Saint-Étienne	A	1–1	Hill	33,678
5 October 1977	Round 1 Second leg	Saint-Étienne	H	2–0	Coppell, Pearson	31,634
19 October 1977	Round 2 First leg	Porto	A	0–4		70,000
2 November 1977	Round 2 Second leg	Porto	H	5–2	Coppell (2), Nicholl, Murça (2 o.g.)	51,831

== Squad statistics ==
Pos.	Name	League		FA Cup		League Cup		Cup Winners' Cup		Other		Total	
Pos.	Name	Apps	Goals	Apps	Goals	Apps	Goals	Apps	Goals	Apps	Goals	Apps	Goals
GK	(Republic of Ireland) Paddy Roche	19	0	4	0	0	0	0	0	0	0	23	0
GK	(England) Alex Stepney	23	0	0	0	1	0	4	0	1	0	29	0
DF	(Scotland) Arthur Albiston	27(1)	0	4	0	1	0	4	0	1	0	37(1)	0
DF	(Scotland) Martin Buchan	28	1	4	0	1	0	4	0	1	0	38	1
DF	(Scotland) Alex Forsyth	3	0	0	0	0	0	0(1)	0	0	0	3(1)	0
DF	(England) Brian Greenhoff	31	1	1	0	1	0	2	0	1	0	36	1
DF	(Scotland) Stewart Houston	31	0	3	0	0	0	2(1)	0	0	0	36(1)	0
DF	(Scotland) Gordon McQueen	14	1	0	0	0	0	0	0	0	0	14	1
DF	(Northern Ireland) Jimmy Nicholl	37	2	4	0	1	0	4	1	1	0	47	3
DF	(England) Martyn Rogers	1	0	0	0	0	0	0	0	0	0	1	0
MF	(England) Steve Coppell	42	5	4	1	1	0	4	3	1	0	52	9
MF	(Republic of Ireland) Ashley Grimes	7(6)	2	1	0	1	0	0(2)	0	0	0	9(8)	2
MF	(England) Gordon Hill	36	17	3	1	1	0	4	1	1	0	45	19
MF	(Scotland) Lou Macari	32	8	4	3	1	0	2	0	1	0	40	11
MF	(Northern Ireland) David McCreery	13(4)	1	0(1)	0	1	1	3	0	0(1)	0	17(6)	2
MF	(Northern Ireland) Chris McGrath	9(9)	1	0	0	0(1)	0	3(1)	0	0	0	12(11)	1
MF	(Northern Ireland) Sammy McIlroy	39	9	4	0	0	0	4	0	1	0	48	9
FW	(England) Jimmy Greenhoff	22(1)	6	2(1)	0	0	0	1	0	1	0	26(2)	6
FW	(Scotland) Joe Jordan	14	3	2	0	0	0	0	0	0	0	16	3
FW	(England) Stuart Pearson	30	10	4	3	1	1	3	1	1	0	39	15
FW	(England) Andy Ritchie	4	0	0	0	0	0	0	0	0	0	4	0
–	Own goals	–	0	–	0	–	0	–	2	–	0	–	2
