= 1981–82 Manchester United F.C. season =

English football club season

Manchester United
1981–82 season
- Chairman: Martin Edwards
- Manager: Ron Atkinson
- First Division: 3rd
- FA Cup: Third round
- League Cup: Second round
- Top goalscorer: League: Frank Stapleton (13); All: Frank Stapleton (13)
- Highest home attendance: 57,830 (v. Manchester City, 27 February 1982)
- Lowest home attendance: 34,499 (v. Coventry City, 17 March 1982)
- Average home league attendance: 42,744
| Home colours | Away colours | Third colours |

The 1981–82 season was Manchester United's 80th season in the Football League, and their 7th consecutive season in the top division of English football.

United had finished eighth in the league the previous season, with manager Dave Sexton being sacked after his four-year spell in charge had failed to deliver a major trophy. His successor was West Bromwich Albion manager Ron Atkinson. One of Atkinson's first moves as manager was to bolster the club's attack with the £950,000 signing of Frank Stapleton from Arsenal, while the previous season's top scorer Joe Jordan was sold to AC Milan. Atkinson retained the services of Garry Birtles, who had been a disappointment in his first season with United, scoring just once in his first 28 games. Birtles had a more successful second season at Old Trafford, finding the net 11 times.

In early October, he brought midfielder Bryan Robson to Old Trafford from his former club West Bromwich Albion for a British record fee of £1.5million. He also signed fellow Albion midfielder Remi Moses for £500,000. Long-serving Northern Ireland international, Sammy McIlroy, left the club after 13 years when he signed for Stoke City in February.

After constantly leading the league during the first half of the season, United finished the season third in the league and qualified for the UEFA Cup, while the league title went to Liverpool (who surged in the second half of the season after being mid table at Christmas) and Ipswich Town finished second. Late in the season came the debut of teenage forward Norman Whiteside, who at the age of 17 was selected for the Northern Ireland squad at the FIFA World Cup. He also scored for United on the last day of the league season in only his second senior appearance for the club.

== First Division ==
| Date | Opponents | H / A | Result F–A | Scorers | Attendance |
|---|---|---|---|---|---|
| 29 August 1981 | Coventry City | A | 1–2 | Macari | 19,329 |
| 31 August 1981 | Nottingham Forest | H | 0–0 | | 51,496 |
| 5 September 1981 | Ipswich Town | H | 1–2 | Stapleton | 45,555 |
| 12 September 1981 | Aston Villa | A | 1–1 | Stapleton | 37,661 |
| 19 September 1981 | Swansea City | H | 1–0 | Birtles | 47,309 |
| 22 September 1981 | Middlesbrough | A | 2–0 | Stapleton, Birtles | 19,895 |
| 26 September 1981 | Arsenal | A | 0–0 | | 39,795 |
| 30 September 1981 | Leeds United | H | 1–0 | Stapleton | 47,019 |
| 3 October 1981 | Wolverhampton Wanderers | H | 5–0 | Stapleton, McIlroy (3), Birtles | 46,837 |
| 10 October 1981 | Manchester City | A | 0–0 | | 52,037 |
| 17 October 1981 | Birmingham City | H | 1–1 | Coppell | 48,800 |
| 21 October 1981 | Middlesbrough | H | 1–0 | Moses | 38,342 |
| 24 October 1981 | Liverpool | A | 2–1 | Moran, Albiston | 41,438 |
| 31 October 1981 | Notts County | H | 2–1 | Birtles, Moses | 45,928 |
| 7 November 1981 | Sunderland | A | 5–1 | Moran, Robson, Stapleton (2), Birtles | 27,070 |
| 21 November 1981 | Tottenham Hotspur | A | 1–3 | Birtles | 35,534 |
| 28 November 1981 | Brighton & Hove Albion | H | 2–0 | Birtles, Stapleton | 41,911 |
| 5 December 1981 | Southampton | A | 2–3 | Stapleton, Robson | 24,404 |
| 6 January 1982 | Everton | H | 1–1 | Stapleton | 40,451 |
| 23 January 1982 | Stoke City | A | 3–0 | Coppell, Stapleton (pen.), Birtles | 19,793 |
| 27 January 1982 | West Ham United | H | 1–0 | Macari | 41,291 |
| 30 January 1982 | Swansea City | A | 0–2 | | 24,115 |
| 6 February 1982 | Aston Villa | H | 4–1 | Moran (2), Robson, Coppell | 43,184 |
| 13 February 1982 | Wolverhampton Wanderers | A | 1–0 | Birtles | 22,481 |
| 20 February 1982 | Arsenal | H | 0–0 | | 43,833 |
| 27 February 1982 | Manchester City | H | 1–1 | Moran | 57,830 |
| 6 March 1982 | Birmingham City | A | 1–0 | Birtles | 19,637 |
| 17 March 1982 | Coventry City | H | 0–1 | | 34,499 |
| 20 March 1982 | Notts County | A | 3–1 | Coppell (2), Stapleton | 17,048 |
| 27 March 1982 | Sunderland | H | 0–0 | | 40,776 |
| 3 April 1982 | Leeds United | A | 0–0 | | 30,953 |
| 7 April 1982 | Liverpool | H | 0–1 | | 48,371 |
| 10 April 1982 | Everton | A | 3–3 | Coppell (2), Grimes | 29,306 |
| 12 April 1982 | West Bromwich Albion | H | 1–0 | Moran | 38,717 |
| 17 April 1982 | Tottenham Hotspur | H | 2–0 | Coppell (pen.), McGarvey | 50,724 |
| 20 April 1982 | Ipswich Town | A | 1–2 | Gidman | 25,744 |
| 24 April 1982 | Brighton & Hove Albion | A | 1–0 | Wilkins | 20,750 |
| 1 May 1982 | Southampton | H | 1–0 | McGarvey | 40,038 |
| 5 May 1982 | Nottingham Forest | A | 1–0 | Stapleton | 18,449 |
| 8 May 1982 | West Ham United | A | 1–1 | Moran | 26,337 |
| 12 May 1982 | West Bromwich Albion | A | 3–0 | Robson, Birtles, Coppell | 19,707 |
| 15 May 1982 | Stoke City | H | 2–0 | Robson, Whiteside | 43,072 |

| Pos | Team | Pld | W | D | L | GF | GA | GD | Pts | Qualification or relegation |
|---|---|---|---|---|---|---|---|---|---|---|
| 1 | Liverpool (C) | 42 | 26 | 9 | 7 | 80 | 32 | +48 | 87 | Qualification for the European Cup first round |
| 2 | Ipswich Town | 42 | 26 | 5 | 11 | 75 | 53 | +22 | 83 | Qualification for the UEFA Cup first round |
| 3 | Manchester United | 42 | 22 | 12 | 8 | 59 | 29 | +30 | 78 | Qualification for the UEFA Cup first round |
| 4 | Tottenham Hotspur | 42 | 20 | 11 | 11 | 67 | 48 | +19 | 71 | Qualification for the Cup Winners' Cup first round (Note: Tottenham Hotspur qualified for the European Cup Winners' Cup first round as the 1981–82 FA Cup winners.) |
| 5 | Arsenal | 42 | 20 | 11 | 11 | 48 | 37 | +11 | 71 | Qualification for the UEFA Cup first round |

Source: World Football
Rules for classification: 1) Points; 2) Goal difference; 3) Goals scored
(C) Champions

== FA Cup ==
| Date | Round | Opponents | H / A | Result F–A | Scorers | Attendance |
|---|---|---|---|---|---|---|
| 2 January 1982 | Round 3 | Watford | A | 0–1 | | 26,104 |

== League Cup ==
| Date | Round | Opponents | H / A | Result F–A | Scorers | Attendance |
|---|---|---|---|---|---|---|
| 7 October 1981 | Round 2 First leg | Tottenham Hotspur | A | 0–1 | | 39,333 |
| 28 October 1981 | Round 2 Second leg | Tottenham Hotspur | H | 0–1 | | 55,890 |

== Squad statistics ==
| Pos. | Name | League | | FA Cup | | Milk Cup | | Total | |
| Pos. | Name | Apps | Goals | Apps | Goals | Apps | Goals | Apps | Goals |
|---|---|---|---|---|---|---|---|---|---|
| GK | (England) Gary Bailey | 39 | 0 | 1 | 0 | 2 | 0 | 42 | 0 |
| GK | (Republic of Ireland) Paddy Roche | 3 | 0 | 0 | 0 | 0 | 0 | 3 | 0 |
| DF | (Scotland) Arthur Albiston | 42 | 1 | 1 | 0 | 2 | 0 | 45 | 1 |
| DF | (Scotland) Martin Buchan | 27 | 0 | 1 | 0 | 2 | 0 | 30 | 0 |
| DF | (England) Mike Duxbury | 19(5) | 0 | 0 | 0 | 0(1) | 0 | 19(6) | 0 |
| DF | (England) John Gidman | 36(1) | 1 | 1 | 0 | 2 | 0 | 39(1) | 1 |
| DF | (Scotland) Gordon McQueen | 21 | 0 | 0 | 0 | 0 | 0 | 21 | 0 |
| DF | (Republic of Ireland) Kevin Moran | 30 | 7 | 1 | 0 | 2 | 0 | 33 | 7 |
| DF | (Northern Ireland) Jimmy Nicholl | 0(1) | 0 | 0 | 0 | 0 | 0 | 0(1) | 0 |
| MF | (England) Steve Coppell | 35(1) | 9 | 0 | 0 | 2 | 0 | 37(1) | 9 |
| MF | (Wales) Alan Davies | 1 | 0 | 0 | 0 | 0 | 0 | 1 | 0 |
| MF | (Republic of Ireland) Ashley Grimes | 9(1) | 1 | 0 | 0 | 0 | 0 | 9(1) | 1 |
| MF | (Scotland) Lou Macari | 10(1) | 2 | 0(1) | 0 | 0 | 0 | 10(2) | 2 |
| MF | (Northern Ireland) Sammy McIlroy | 12 | 3 | 1 | 0 | 1 | 0 | 14 | 3 |
| MF | (England) Remi Moses | 20(1) | 2 | 1 | 0 | 1 | 0 | 22(1) | 2 |
| MF | (England) Bryan Robson | 32 | 5 | 1 | 0 | 2 | 0 | 35 | 5 |
| MF | (England) Ray Wilkins | 42 | 1 | 1 | 0 | 2 | 0 | 45 | 1 |
| FW | (England) Garry Birtles | 32(1) | 11 | 1 | 0 | 2 | 0 | 35(1) | 11 |
| FW | (Scotland) Scott McGarvey | 10(6) | 2 | 0 | 0 | 0 | 0 | 10(6) | 2 |
| FW | (Republic of Ireland) Frank Stapleton | 41 | 13 | 1 | 0 | 2 | 0 | 44 | 13 |
| FW | (Northern Ireland) Norman Whiteside | 1(1) | 1 | 0 | 0 | 0 | 0 | 1(1) | 1 |
