= 1979–80 Manchester United F.C. season =

English football club season

Manchester United
1979–80 season
- Chairman: Louis Edwards (until 25 February 1980); Martin Edwards (from 22 March 1980)
- Manager: Dave Sexton
- First Division: 2nd
- FA Cup: Third Round
- League Cup: Third Round
- Top goalscorer: League: Joe Jordan (13); All: Joe Jordan (13)
- Highest home attendance: 57,471 vs Leeds United (8 December 1979)
- Lowest home attendance: 43,329 vs Bristol City (23 February 1980)
- Average home league attendance: 51,557
Home colours	Away colours

The 1979–80 season was Manchester United's 78th season in the Football League, and their fifth consecutive season in the top division of English football. They finished the season second in the league, just two points behind champions Liverpool, and qualified for the 1980–81 UEFA Cup. It was the first season at the club for new midfielder Ray Wilkins, signed in the 1979 close season for a club record fee of £750,000. However, United had gained a reputation for playing relatively dull football under Sexton after the more entertaining style of play under Tommy Docherty, and by the end of his third season as manager they had still yet to win a major trophy, as Liverpool won a fifth title in eight seasons.

On 25 February 1980 United's chairman since 1965, Louis Edwards died suddenly and unexpectedly of a heart attack. His son Martin Edwards replaced him as chairman on 22 March 1980.

== First Division ==
Date	Opponents	H / A	Result F–A	Scorers	Attendance
18 August 1979	Southampton	A	1–1	McQueen	21,768
22 August 1979	West Bromwich Albion	H	2–0	McQueen, Coppell	53,393
25 August 1979	Arsenal	A	0–0		44,380
1 September 1979	Middlesbrough	H	2–1	Macari (2)	51,015
8 September 1979	Aston Villa	A	3–0	Coppell, Thomas (pen.), Grimes	36,183
15 September 1979	Derby County	H	1–0	Grimes	54,308
22 September 1979	Wolverhampton Wanderers	A	1–3	Macari	35,503
29 September 1979	Stoke City	H	4–0	Wilkins, McQueen (2), McIlroy	52,596
6 October 1979	Brighton & Hove Albion	H	2–0	Coppell, Macari	52,641
10 October 1979	West Bromwich Albion	A	0–2		27,713
13 October 1979	Bristol City	A	1–1	Macari	28,305
20 October 1979	Ipswich Town	H	1–0	Grimes	50,826
27 October 1979	Everton	A	0–0		37,708
3 November 1979	Southampton	H	1–0	Macari	50,215
10 November 1979	Manchester City	A	0–2		50,567
17 November 1979	Crystal Palace	H	1–1	Jordan	52,800
24 November 1979	Norwich City	H	5–0	Macari, Moran, Coppell, Jordan (2)	46,540
1 December 1979	Tottenham Hotspur	A	2–1	Macari, Coppell	51,389
8 December 1979	Leeds United	H	1–1	Thomas	57,471
15 December 1979	Coventry City	A	2–1	McQueen, Macari	25,541
22 December 1979	Nottingham Forest	H	3–0	Jordan (2), McQueen	54,607
26 December 1979	Liverpool	A	0–2		51,073
29 December 1979	Arsenal	H	3–0	McQueen, Jordan, McIlroy (pen.)	54,295
12 January 1980	Middlesbrough	A	1–1	Thomas	30,587
2 February 1980	Derby County	A	3–1	Thomas, McIlroy, B. Powell (o.g.)	27,783
9 February 1980	Wolverhampton Wanderers	H	0–1		51,568
16 February 1980	Stoke City	A	1–1	Coppell	28,389
23 February 1980	Bristol City	H	4–0	Jordan (2), McIlroy, Merrick (o.g.)	43,329
27 February 1980	Bolton Wanderers	H	2–0	McQueen, Coppell	47,546
1 March 1980	Ipswich Town	A	0–6		30,229
12 March 1980	Everton	H	0–0		45,515
15 March 1980	Brighton & Hove Albion	A	0–0		30,243
22 March 1980	Manchester City	H	1–0	Thomas	56,387
29 March 1980	Crystal Palace	A	2–0	Jordan, Thomas	33,056
2 April 1980	Nottingham Forest	A	0–2		31,417
5 April 1980	Liverpool	H	2–1	Thomas, Greenhoff	57,342
7 April 1980	Bolton Wanderers	A	3–1	McQueen, Thomas, Coppell	31,902
12 April 1980	Tottenham Hotspur	H	4–1	Ritchie (3), Wilkins	53,151
19 April 1980	Norwich City	A	2–0	Jordan (2)	24,697
23 April 1980	Aston Villa	H	2–1	Jordan (2)	45,201
26 April 1980	Coventry City	H	2–1	McIlroy (2; 1 pen)	52,154
3 May 1980	Leeds United	A	0–2		39,625

Pos	Team	Pld	W	D	L	GF	GA	GD	Pts	Qualification or relegation
1	Liverpool (C)	42	25	10	7	81	30	+51	60	Qualification for the European Cup first round
2	Manchester United	42	24	10	8	65	35	+30	58	Qualification for the UEFA Cup first round
3	Ipswich Town	42	22	9	11	68	39	+29	53	Qualification for the UEFA Cup first round
4	Arsenal	42	18	16	8	52	36	+16	52	
5	Nottingham Forest	42	20	8	14	63	43	+20	48	Qualification for the European Cup first round (Note: Nottingham Forest qualified for the European Cup first round as the 1979–80 European Cup winners.)

Source: World Football
Rules for classification: 1) Points; 2) Goal difference; 3) Goals scored
(C) Champions

== FA Cup ==
Date	Round	Opponents	H / A	Result F–A	Scorers	Attendance
5 January 1980	Round 3	Tottenham Hotspur	A	1–1	McIlroy (pen.)	45,207
9 January 1980	Round 3 Replay	Tottenham Hotspur	H	0–1		53,762

== League Cup ==
Date	Round	Opponents	H / A	Result F–A	Scorers	Attendance
29 August 1979	Round 2 First leg	Tottenham Hotspur	A	1–2	Thomas	29,163
5 September 1979	Round 2 Second leg	Tottenham Hotspur	H	3–1	Thomas, Coppell, Miller (o.g.)	48,292
26 September 1979	Round 3	Norwich City	A	1–4	McIlroy	18,312

== Squad statistics ==
Pos.	Name	League		FA Cup		League Cup		Total	
Pos.	Name	Apps	Goals	Apps	Goals	Apps	Goals	Apps	Goals
GK	(England) Gary Bailey	42	0	2	0	3	0	47	0
DF	(Scotland) Arthur Albiston	25	0	0	0	3	0	28	0
DF	(Scotland) Martin Buchan	42	0	2	0	3	0	47	0
DF	(Scotland) Stewart Houston	14	0	2	0	1	0	17	0
DF	(Socialist Federal Republic of Yugoslavia) Nikola Jovanović	1(1)	0	0	0	0	0	1(1)	0
DF	(Scotland) Gordon McQueen	33	9	2	0	2	0	37	9
DF	(Republic of Ireland) Kevin Moran	9	1	0	0	0	0	9	1
DF	(Northern Ireland) Jimmy Nicholl	42	0	2	0	3	0	47	0
DF	(Scotland) Steve Paterson	0(1)	0	0	0	1	0	1(1)	0
MF	(England) Steve Coppell	42	8	2	0	2	1	46	9
MF	(Republic of Ireland) Ashley Grimes	20(6)	3	0	0	1	0	21(6)	3
MF	(Scotland) Lou Macari	39	9	2	0	3	0	44	9
MF	(Northern Ireland) Chris McGrath	0(1)	0	0	0	0	0	0(1)	0
MF	(Northern Ireland) Sammy McIlroy	41	6	2	1	2	1	45	8
MF	(Northern Ireland) Tom Sloan	1(4)	0	0	0	0	0	1(4)	0
MF	(Wales) Mickey Thomas	35	8	2	0	3	2	40	10
MF	(England) Ray Wilkins	37	2	2	0	3	0	42	2
FW	(England) Jimmy Greenhoff	4(1)	1	0	0	0	0	4(1)	1
FW	(Scotland) Joe Jordan	32	13	2	0	2	0	36	13
FW	(England) Andy Ritchie	3(5)	3	0	0	1(2)	0	4(7)	3
—	Own goals	—	2	—	0	—	1	—	3
