= 1976–77 Manchester United F.C. season =

English football club season

Manchester United
1976–77 season
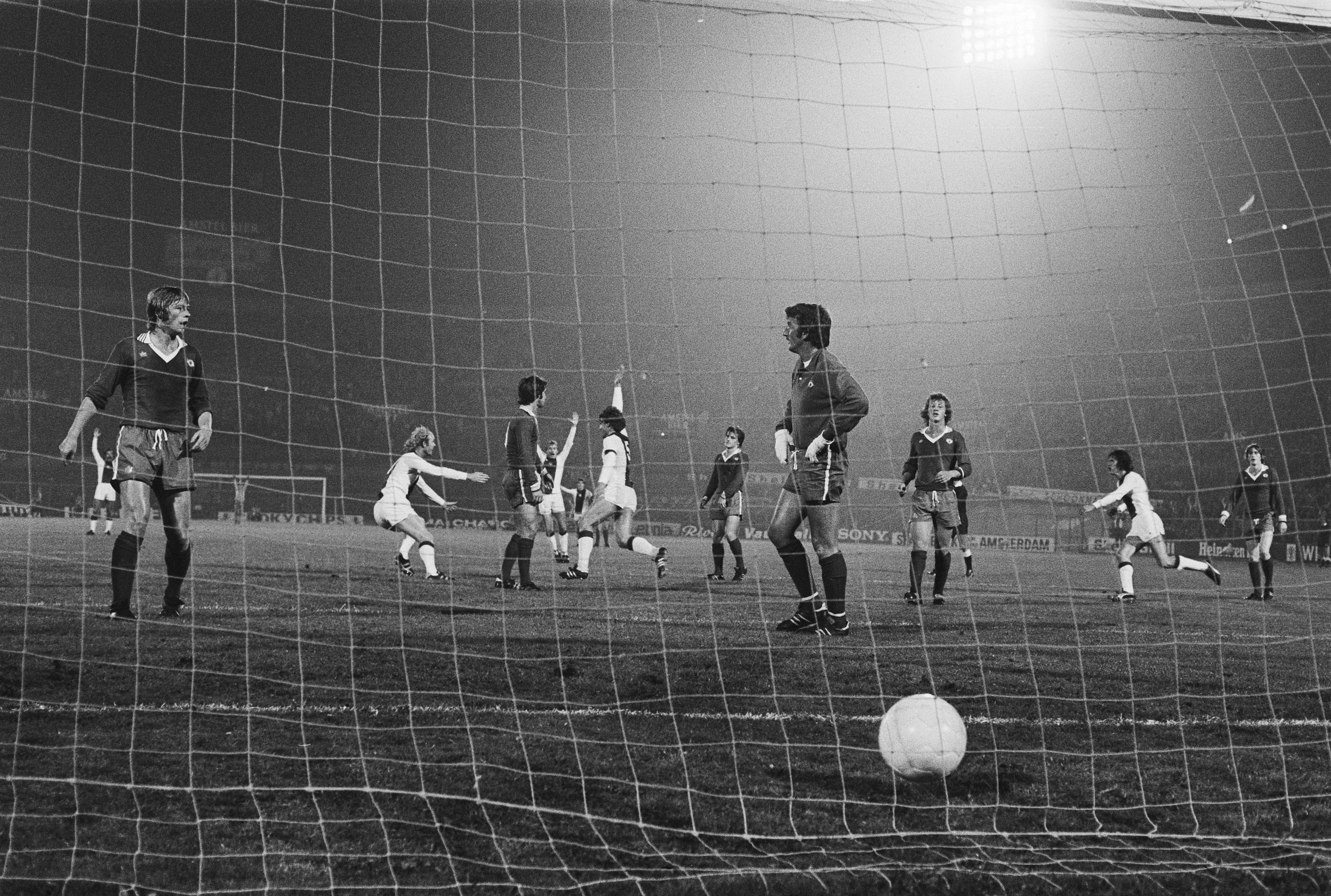
- Ruud Krol celebrates after scoring for Ajax against United in the UEFA Cup, 15 September 1976
- Chairman: Louis Edwards
- Manager: Tommy Docherty
- First Division: 6th
- FA Cup: Winners
- League Cup: Fifth Round
- UEFA Cup: Second Round
- Top goalscorer: League: Gordon Hill (15); Stuart Pearson (15); All: Gordon Hill (22)
- Highest home attendance: 60,723 vs Tottenham Hotspur (4 September 1976)
- Lowest home attendance: 37,586 vs Tranmere Rovers (1 September 1976)
- Average home league attendance: 53,390
Home colours	Away colours	Third colours

The 1976–77 season was Manchester United's 75th season in the Football League, and their second consecutive season in the top division of English football. They finished sixth in the league and won the FA Cup, beating rivals Liverpool in the final to win their first major trophy since the European Cup triumph nine years prior. Despite this success, it was to be their last season under the management of Tommy Docherty, who had been at the helm for four-and-a-half years and revived United following several years of decline. During the close season, he was dismissed by the club after revealing his love affair with the wife of the club's physiotherapist.

== First Division ==
Date	Opponents	H / A	Result F–A	Scorers	Attendance
21 August 1976	Birmingham City	H	2–2	Coppell, Pearson	58,898
24 August 1976	Coventry City	A	2–0	Macari, Hill	26,775
28 August 1976	Derby County	A	0–0		30,054
4 September 1976	Tottenham Hotspur	H	2–3	Coppell, Pearson	60,723
11 September 1976	Newcastle United	A	2–2	B. Greenhoff, Pearson	39,037
18 September 1976	Middlesbrough	H	2–0	McAndrew (o.g.), Pearson	56,712
25 September 1976	Manchester City	A	3–1	Coppell, McCreery, Daly	48,861
2 October 1976	Leeds United	A	2–0	Daly, Coppell	44,512
16 October 1976	West Bromwich Albion	A	0–4		36,615
23 October 1976	Norwich City	H	2–2	Daly (pen.), Hill	54,356
30 October 1976	Ipswich Town	H	0–1		57,416
6 November 1976	Aston Villa	A	2–3	Pearson. Hill	44,789
10 November 1976	Sunderland	H	3–3	Hill, Pearson, B. Greenhoff	42,685
20 November 1976	Leicester City	A	1–1	Daly (pen.)	26,421
27 November 1976	West Ham United	H	0–2		55,366
18 December 1976	Arsenal	A	1–3	McIlroy	39,572
27 December 1976	Everton	H	4–0	Pearson, J. Greenhoff, Hill, Macari	56,786
1 January 1977	Aston Villa	H	2–0	Pearson (2)	55,446
3 January 1977	Ipswich Town	A	1–2	Pearson	30,105
15 January 1977	Coventry City	H	2–0	Macari (2)	46,567
19 January 1977	Bristol City	H	2–1	Pearson, B. Greenhoff	43,051
22 January 1977	Birmingham City	A	3–2	J. Greenhoff, Pearson, Houston	35,316
5 February 1977	Derby County	H	3–1	Macari, Houston, Powell (o.g.)	54,044
12 February 1977	Tottenham Hotspur	A	3–1	Macari, McIlroy, Hill	46,946
16 February 1977	Liverpool	H	0–0		57,487
19 February 1977	Newcastle United	H	3–1	J. Greenhoff (3)	51,828
5 March 1977	Manchester City	H	3–1	Pearson, Hill, Coppell	58,595
12 March 1977	Leeds United	H	1–0	Cherry (o.g.)	60,612
23 March 1977	West Bromwich Albion	H	2–2	Hill (pen.), Coppell	51,053
2 April 1977	Norwich City	A	1–2	Powell (o.g.)	24,161
5 April 1977	Everton	A	2–1	Hill (2)	38,216
9 April 1977	Stoke City	H	3–0	Houston, Macari, Pearson	53,102
11 April 1977	Sunderland	A	1–2	Hill (pen.)	38,785
16 April 1977	Leicester City	H	1–1	J. Greenhoff	49,161
19 April 1977	Queens Park Rangers	A	0–4		28,848
26 April 1977	Middlesbrough	A	0–3		21,744
30 April 1977	Queens Park Rangers	H	1–0	Macari	50,788
3 May 1977	Liverpool	A	0–1		53,046
7 May 1977	Bristol City	A	1–1	J. Greenhoff (pen.)	28,864
11 May 1977	Stoke City	A	3–3	Hill (2), McCreery	24,204
14 May 1977	Arsenal	H	3–2	J. Greenhoff, Macari, Hill	53,232
16 May 1977	West Ham United	A	2–4	Hill, Pearson	29,904

Pos	Team	Pld	W	D	L	GF	GA	GD	Pts	Qualification or relegation
4	Aston Villa	42	22	7	13	76	50	+26	51	Qualification for the UEFA Cup first round
5	Newcastle United	42	18	13	11	64	49	+15	49	Qualification for the UEFA Cup first round
6	Manchester United	42	18	11	13	71	62	+9	47	Qualification for the European Cup Winners' Cup first round (Note: Manchester United qualified for the European Cup Winners' Cup first round as the 1976–77 FA Cup winners.)
7	West Bromwich Albion	42	16	13	13	62	56	+6	45	
8	Arsenal	42	16	11	15	64	59	+5	43	

Source: World Football
Rules for classification: 1) Points; 2) Goal difference; 3) Goals scored

== FA Cup ==
Date	Round	Opponents	H / A	Result F–A	Scorers	Attendance
8 January 1977	Round 3	Walsall	H	1–0	Hill	48,870
29 January 1977	Round 4	Queens Park Rangers	H	1–0	Macari	57,422
26 February 1977	Round 5	Southampton	A	2–2	Macari, Hill	29,137
8 March 1977	Round 5 Replay	Southampton	H	2–1	J. Greenhoff (2)	58,103
19 March 1977	Round 6	Aston Villa	H	2–1	Houston, Macari	57,089
23 April 1977	Semi-final	Leeds United	N	2–1	J. Greenhoff, Coppell	55,000
21 May 1977	Final	Liverpool	N	2–1	Pearson, J. Greenhoff	100,000

== League Cup ==
Date	Round	Opponents	H / A	Result F–A	Scorers	Attendance
1 September 1976	Round 2	Tranmere Rovers	H	5–0	Daly (2), Macari, Pearson, Hill	37,586
22 September 1976	Round 3	Sunderland	H	2–2	Pearson, Clarke (o.g.)	46,170
4 October 1976	Round 3 Replay	Sunderland	A	2–2	B. Greenhoff, Daly (pen.)	46,170
6 October 1976	Round 3; 2nd Replay	Sunderland	H	1–0	B. Greenhoff	47,689
27 October 1976	Round 4	Newcastle United	H	7–2	Houston, Hill (3), Pearson, Nicholl, Coppell	52,002
1 December 1976	Round 5	Everton	H	0–3		57,738

== UEFA Cup ==
Date	Round	Opponents	H / A	Result F–A	Scorers	Attendance
15 September 1976	Round 1 First leg	Ajax	A	0–1		30,000
29 September 1976	Round 1 Second leg	Ajax	H	2–0	Macari, McIlroy	58,918
20 October 1976	Round 2 First leg	Juventus	H	1–0	Hill	59,021
3 November 1976	Round 2 Second leg	Juventus	A	0–3		66,632

== Squad statistics ==
Pos.	Name	League		FA Cup		League Cup		UEFA Cup		Total	
Pos.	Name	Apps	Goals	Apps	Goals	Apps	Goals	Apps	Goals	Apps	Goals
GK	(Republic of Ireland) Paddy Roche	2	0	0	0	0	0	0	0	2	0
GK	(England) Alex Stepney	40	0	7	0	6	0	4	0	57	0
DF	(Scotland) Arthur Albiston	14(3)	0	1	0	2(2)	0	2(1)	0	19(6)	0
DF	(Scotland) Martin Buchan	33	0	7	0	4	0	2	0	46	0
DF	(Scotland) Alex Forsyth	3(1)	0	0	0	1	0	0	0	4(1)	0
DF	(England) Brian Greenhoff	40	3	7	0	6	2	4	0	57	5
DF	(Scotland) Stewart Houston	36	3	6	1	5	1	4	0	51	5
DF	(Northern Ireland) Jimmy Nicholl	39	0	7	0	5	1	4	0	55	1
DF	(Scotland) Steve Paterson	2	0	0	0	1	0	0(2)	0	3(2)	0
DF	(England) Colin Waldron	3	0	0	0	1	0	0	0	4	0
MF	(Wales) Jonathan Clark	0(1)	0	0	0	0	0	0	0	0(1)	0
MF	(England) Steve Coppell	40	6	7	1	5	1	4	0	56	8
MF	(Republic of Ireland) Gerry Daly	16(1)	4	0(1)	0	6	3	4	0	26(2)	7
MF	(Northern Ireland) Tommy Jackson	2	0	0	0	1	0	0	0	3	0
MF	(Northern Ireland) David McCreery	9(16)	2	0(3)	0	3(2)	0	1(3)	0	13(24)	2
MF	(Northern Ireland) Chris McGrath	2(4)	0	0	0	0(1)	0	0	0	2(5)	0
MF	(Northern Ireland) Sammy McIlroy	39(1)	2	7	0	6	0	4	1	56(1)	3
FW	(England) Alan Foggon	0(3)	0	0	0	0	0	0	0	0(3)	0
FW	(England) Jimmy Greenhoff	27	8	7	4	0	0	0	0	34	12
FW	(England) Gordon Hill	38(1)	15	7	2	6	4	4	1	55(1)	22
FW	(Scotland) Lou Macari	38	9	7	3	4	1	4	1	53	14
FW	(England) Stuart Pearson	39	15	7	1	4	3	3	0	53	19
–	Own goals	–	4	–	0	–	1	–	0	–	5
