= 1979 FA Cup final =

Football match in London, England

- Match programme cover
- Event: 1978–79 FA Cup
Arsenal	Manchester United
3	2
- Date: 12 May 1979
- Venue: Wembley Stadium, London
- Referee: Ron Challis (Kent)
- Attendance: 99,219

The 1979 FA Cup final was a football match played on 12 May 1979 at Wembley Stadium. The match was contested by Arsenal and Manchester United. It is regarded as one of the greatest-ever finishes in an FA Cup final. For over 85 minutes the game had been unremarkable, with Arsenal taking a 2–0 half time lead through goals from Brian Talbot and Frank Stapleton. In the 86th minute, however, Gordon McQueen scored following a set-piece, and two minutes later Sammy McIlroy dribbled past two Arsenal players to score a dramatic equaliser. With the game poised for extra time, United's celebrations proved short-lived, as Alan Sunderland scored a last-minute winner, making the final result Arsenal 3–2 Manchester United. This match is often referred to as the "Five-minute Final".

The 1979 FA Cup was the only major trophy that Arsenal won during the seven-year management of Terry Neill, who was appointed in 1976 after Bertie Mee's retirement. He was dismissed in 1983.

It was also the only cup final that Manchester United reached under the management of Dave Sexton, who had been appointed as manager in 1977 and remained there until 1981 when he was sacked having failed to bring a major trophy to the club.

== Match details ==
12 May 1979

Arsenal	3–2	Manchester United
Talbot 12'; Stapleton 43'; Sunderland 89'	Report	McQueen 86'; McIlroy 88'

Wembley, London
Attendance: 99,219
Referee: Ron Challis (Kent)

Arsenal	Manchester United

GK	1	(Northern Ireland) Pat Jennings
RB	2	(Northern Ireland) Pat Rice (c)
LB	3	(Northern Ireland) Sammy Nelson
CM	4	(England) Brian Talbot
CB	5	(Republic of Ireland) David O'Leary
CB	6	(Scotland) Willie Young
RM	7	(Republic of Ireland) Liam Brady
CF	8	(England) Alan Sunderland
CF	9	(Republic of Ireland) Frank Stapleton
CM	10	(England) David Price	(substituted off) 83'
LM	11	(England) Graham Rix
Substitute:
DF	12	(England) Steve Walford	(substituted on) 83'
Manager:
(Northern Ireland) Terry Neill

GK	1	(England) Gary Bailey
RB	2	(Northern Ireland) Jimmy Nicholl
LB	3	(Scotland) Arthur Albiston
CM	4	(Northern Ireland) Sammy McIlroy
CB	5	(Scotland) Gordon McQueen
CB	6	(Scotland) Martin Buchan (c)
RM	7	(England) Steve Coppell
CF	8	(England) Jimmy Greenhoff
CF	9	(Scotland) Joe Jordan
CM	10	(Scotland) Lou Macari
LM	11	(Wales) Mickey Thomas
Substitute:
CB	12	(England) Brian Greenhoff
Manager:
(England) Dave Sexton
