= 1992–93 Chester City F.C. season =

Chester City
1992–93 season
- Manager: Harry McNally; Graham Barrow
- Stadium: Deva Stadium
- Football League Second Division: 24th (relegated)
- FA Cup: Round 1
- Football League Cup: Round 1
- Football League Trophy: Group
- Top goalscorer: League: Stuart Rimmer (20); All: Stuart Rimmer (20)
- Highest home attendance: 5,237 vs Stoke City (3 October)
- Lowest home attendance: 1,614 vs Bournemouth (9 March)
- Average home league attendance: 3,035; 23rd in division

The 1992–93 season was the 55th season of competitive association football in the Football League played by Chester City, an English club based in Chester, Cheshire.

Also, it was the seventh season spent in the Third Division, which was renamed the Second Division before the season started, after the promotion from the Fourth Division in 1986. Alongside competing in the Football League the club also participated in the FA Cup, the Football League Cup and the Football League Trophy.

== Football League ==
Pos	Team	Pld	W	D	L	GF	GA	GD	Pts	Qualification or relegation
1	Stoke City (C, P)	46	27	12	7	73	34	+39	93	Promotion to the First Division
2	Bolton Wanderers (P)	46	27	9	10	80	41	+39	90	Promotion to the First Division
3	Port Vale	46	26	11	9	79	44	+35	89	Qualification for the Second Division play-offs
4	West Bromwich Albion (O, P)	46	25	10	11	88	54	+34	85	Qualification for the Second Division play-offs
5	Swansea City	46	20	13	13	65	47	+18	73	Qualification for the Second Division play-offs
6	Stockport County	46	19	15	12	81	57	+24	72	Qualification for the Second Division play-offs
7	Leyton Orient	46	21	9	16	69	53	+16	72	
8	Reading	46	18	15	13	66	51	+15	69	
9	Brighton & Hove Albion	46	20	9	17	63	59	+4	69	
10	Bradford City	46	18	14	14	69	67	+2	68	
11	Rotherham United	46	17	14	15	60	60	0	65	
12	Fulham	46	16	17	13	57	55	+2	65	
13	Burnley	46	15	16	15	57	59	−2	61	
14	Plymouth Argyle	46	16	12	18	59	64	−5	60	
15	Huddersfield Town	46	17	9	20	54	61	−7	60	
16	Hartlepool United	46	14	12	20	42	60	−18	54	
17	Bournemouth	46	12	17	17	45	52	−7	53	
18	Blackpool	46	12	15	19	63	75	−12	51	
19	Exeter City	46	11	17	18	54	69	−15	50	
20	Hull City	46	13	11	22	46	69	−23	50	
21	Preston North End (R)	46	13	8	25	65	94	−29	47	Relegation to the Third Division
22	Mansfield Town (R)	46	11	11	24	52	80	−28	44	Relegation to the Third Division
23	Wigan Athletic (R)	46	10	11	25	43	72	−29	41	Relegation to the Third Division
24	Chester City (R)	46	8	5	33	49	102	−53	29	Relegation to the Third Division

Rules for classification: 1) Points; 2) Goals scored; 3) Goal difference
(C) Champions; (O) Play-off winners; (P) Promoted; (R) Relegated

=== Results summary ===
Overall								Home						Away					
Pld	W	D	L	GF	GA	GD	Pts	W	D	L	GF	GA	GD	W	D	L	GF	GA	GD
46	8	5	33	49	102	−53	29	6	2	15	30	47	−17	2	3	18	19	55	−36

Source: rsssf.com

=== Results by matchday ===
Round	1	2	3	4	5	6	7	8	9	10	11	12	13	14	15	16	17	18	19	20	21	22	23	24	25	26	27	28	29	30	31	32	33	34	35	36	37	38	39	40	41	42	43	44	45	46
Result	L	D	L	L	W	L	L	L	L	D	L	D	L	W	D	W	L	L	L	W	L	L	L	L	L	L	L	W	L	L	W	L	L	W	L	L	W	L	D	L	L	L	L	L	L	L
Position	22	20	20	20	16	18	21	23	23	23	24	24	24	22	22	21	22	22	22	21	21	23	23	23	23	23	23	23	23	23	24	24	24	23	24	24	24	24	24	24	24	24	24	24	24	24

Source: 11v11.com
W = Win; D = Draw; L = Loss

=== Matches ===
Date	Opponents	Venue	Result	Score	Scorers	Attendance
15 August	Bradford City	A	L	1–3	Bishop	5,780
22 August	Hull City	A	D	1–1	Rimmer	4,906
29 August	Preston North End	A	L	3–4	Bishop, Rimmer, Morton	4,471
1 September	Hartlepool United	A	L	0–2		3,061
5 September	Burnley	H	W	3–0	Morton, Lightfoot, Comstive	4,981
12 September	Leyton Orient	A	L	3–4	Barrow, Rimmer, Ryan	4,158
15 September	Mansfield Town	H	L	1–2	Rimmer	3,326
19 September	Stockport County	H	L	0–3		3,627
26 September	Port Vale	A	L	0–2		6,392
3 October	Stoke City	H	D	1–1	Bishop	5,237
10 October	Plymouth Argyle	A	L	0–2		7,182
17 October	Bolton Wanderers	H	D	2–2	Ryan, Comstive (pen)	3,394
24 October	Fulham	A	L	0–1		3,753
31 October	Brighton & Hove Albion	H	W	2–1	Rimmer, Morton	2,735
3 November	Rotherham United	A	D	3–3	Rimmer, Pugh (2)	4,188
7 November	Swansea City	H	W	3–2	Lightfoot, Pugh (2)	2,861
21 November	Exeter City	A	L	0–2		2,452
28 November	Wigan Athletic	H	L	1–2	Rimmer (pen)	2,395
12 December	Reading	H	L	0–3		2,011
19 December	Huddersfield Town	A	W	2–0	Rimmer, Kelly	4,626
26 December	West Bromwich Albion	A	L	0–2		15,209
28 December	Blackpool	H	L	1–2	Barrow	3,787
2 January	Leyton Orient	H	L	1–3	Bishop	2,510
9 January	Mansfield Town	A	L	0–2		2,659
16 January	Port Vale	H	L	1–2	Pugh	4,367
22 January	Stockport County	A	L	0–2		4,427
26 January	Preston North End	H	L	2–4	Rimmer (2, 1pen)	2,901
30 January	Hull City	H	W	3–0	Rimmer (2), Bishop	2,232
6 February	Bradford City	H	L	2–5	Rimmer, Bishop	2,594
13 February	Burnley	A	L	0–5		9,434
20 February	Hartlepool United	H	W	1–0	Rimmer (pen)	1,912
27 February	Plymouth Argyle	H	L	1–2	Rimmer	2,163
6 March	Stoke City	A	L	0–4		14,534
9 March	Bournemouth	H	W	1–0	Abel	1,614
13 March	Swansea City	A	L	2–4	Rimmer (2)	4,056
19 March	Rotherham United	H	L	1–2	Thompson	2,265
23 March	Wigan Athletic	A	W	2–1	Comstive, Rimmer	1,861
27 March	Exeter City	H	L	0–3		2,047
3 April	Bournemouth	A	D	0–0		2,829
7 April	Reading	A	L	0–1		3,754
10 April	West Bromwich Albion	H	L	1–3	Morton	4,812
13 April	Blackpool	A	L	0–2		5,078
17 April	Huddersfield Town	H	L	0–2		3,019
24 April	Bolton Wanderers	A	L	0–5		8,514
1 May	Fulham	H	L	2–3	Rimmer, Thompson	2,016
8 May	Brighton & Hove Albion	A	L	2–3	Thompson, Rimmer	6,247

== FA Cup ==
Round	Date	Opponents	Venue	Result	Score	Scorers	Attendance
First round	14 November	Altrincham (5)	H	D	1–1	Ryan	4,033
First round replay	25 November	Altrincham (5)	A	L	0–2		3,000

== League Cup ==
Round	Date	Opponents	Venue	Result	Score	Scorers	Attendance
First round first leg	18 August	Stockport County (3)	A	D	1–1	Comstive	2,785
First round second leg	25 August	Stockport County (3)	H	L	1–2	Bishop	4,505

== Football League Trophy ==
Round	Date	Opponents	Venue	Result	Score	Scorers	Attendance
Group stage	5 December	Chesterfield (3)	H	L	0–1		1,276
Group stage	15 December	Stockport County (2)	A	L	0–2		2,064

== Season statistics ==
Nat	Player	Total		League		FA Cup		League Cup		FL Trophy	
Nat	Player	A	G	A	G	A	G	A	G	A	G
Goalkeepers
(England)	John Keeley	4	–	4	–	–	–	–	–	–	–
(England)	Billy Stewart	48	–	42	–	2	–	2	–	2	–
Field players
(England)	Graham Abel	32+6	1	28+5	1	2	–	2	–	0+1	–
(Scotland)	Arthur Albiston	25+1	–	23+1	–	–	–	–	–	2	–
(England)	Graham Barrow	36+1	2	32+1	2	2	–	–	–	2	–
(England)	Eddie Bishop	28+4	7	25+4	6	–	–	2	1	1	–
(England)	Barry Butler	34+1	–	30+1	–	1	–	1	–	2	–
(England)	Mark Came	19	–	17	–	–	–	–	–	2	–
(England)	Paul Comstive	31+2	4	26+2	3	2	–	2	1	1	–
(England)	Shaun Garnett	9	–	9	–	–	–	–	–	–	–
(Wales)	Craig Goodwin	3+4	–	3+2	–	0+1	–	0+1	–	–	–
(Republic of Ireland)	John Kelly	26+8	1	24+7	1	1	–	–	–	1+1	–
(England)	Chris Lightfoot	45	2	39	2	2	–	2	–	2	–
(Wales)	Marc Limbert	12+2	–	12+2	–	–	–	–	–	–	–
(England)	Neil Morton	22+9	4	20+7	4	0+1	–	0+1	–	2	–
(England)	Roger Preece	28	–	23	–	2	–	2	–	1	–
(England)	David Pugh	40	5	35	5	2	–	2	–	1	–
(England)	Stuart Rimmer	47	20	43	20	2	–	2	–	–	–
(England)	Darren Ryan	9+14	3	5+12	2	1+1	1	2	–	1+1	–
(England)	David Thompson	35+9	3	30+9	3	2	–	2	–	1	–
(Wales)	Paul Wheeler (footballer)	12+3	–	12+3	–	–	–	–	–	–	–
(England)	Spencer Whelan	27+5	–	24+4	–	1	–	1+1	–	1	–
	Total	52	52	46	49	2	1	2	2	2	0
