= 1977 FA Charity Shield =

Liverpool	Manchester United
0	0
- Date: 13 August 1977
- Venue: Wembley Stadium, London
- Referee: Keith Styles (Barnsley)
- Attendance: 82,000

The 1977 FA Charity Shield was the 55th FA Charity Shield, an annual football match played between the winners of the previous season's First Division and FA Cup competitions. The match was played on 13 August 1977 at Wembley Stadium and contested by Liverpool, who had won the 1976–77 First Division, and Manchester United, who had won the 1976–77 FA Cup. The teams played out a goalless draw and shared the Charity Shield.

== Match details ==
13 August 1977
15:00 BST

Liverpool	0–0	Manchester United
	Report

Wembley, London
Attendance: 82,000

Liverpool	Manchester United

GK	1	(England) Ray Clemence
RB	2	(England) Phil Neal
LB	3	(Wales) Joey Jones
CB	4	(England) Phil Thompson
LM	5	(England) Ray Kennedy
CB	6	(England) Emlyn Hughes (c)
CF	7	(Scotland) Kenny Dalglish
CM	8	(England) Jimmy Case
CF	9	(England) David Fairclough
CM	10	(England) Terry McDermott
RM	11	(England) Ian Callaghan
Substitutes:
DF	12	(England) Tommy Smith
FW	13	(England) David Johnson
DF	14	(Scotland) Alan Hansen
MF	15	(Republic of Ireland) Steve Heighway
GK	16	(England) Peter McDonnell
Manager:
(England) Bob Paisley

GK	1	(England) Alex Stepney
DF	2	(Northern Ireland) Jimmy Nicholl
DF	3	(Scotland) Arthur Albiston
MF	4	(Northern Ireland) Sammy McIlroy
DF	5	(England) Brian Greenhoff
DF	6	(Scotland) Martin Buchan (c)
MF	7	(England) Steve Coppell
MF	8	(England) Jimmy Greenhoff	Substituted off
FW	9	(England) Stuart Pearson
FW	10	(Scotland) Lou Macari
MF	11	(England) Gordon Hill
Substitutes:
MF	12	(Northern Ireland) David McCreery	Substituted on
GK	13	(Republic of Ireland) Paddy Roche
DF	14	(Scotland) Alex Forsyth
MF	15	(Northern Ireland) Chris McGrath
MF	16	(Republic of Ireland) Ashley Grimes
Manager:
(England) Dave Sexton

Match rules

- 90 minutes, no extra time
- Five named substitutes
- Maximum of three substitutions

== See also ==
- 1976–77 Football League
- 1976–77 FA Cup
