= Martin Buchan =

Scottish footballer (born 1949)

Personal information
- Full name: Martin McLean Buchan
- Date of birth: 6 March 1949 (age 77)
- Place of birth: Aberdeen, Scotland
- Height: 5 ft 9 in (1.75 m)
- Position: Centre-back

Senior career*
| Years | Team | Apps | (Gls) |
- Banks O' Dee
| 1965–1972 | Aberdeen | 133 | (9) |
| 1967 | → Washington Whips (guest) | 8 | (1) |
| 1972–1983 | Manchester United | 376 | (4) |
| 1983–1985 | Oldham Athletic | 28 | (0) |
| Total | | 545 | (14) |

International career
| 1971–1978 | Scotland | 34 | (0) |

Managerial career
- 1985: Burnley
- * Club domestic league appearances and goals

Martin McLean Buchan (born 6 March 1949) is a Scottish former professional footballer who played as a centre back. Born in Aberdeen, he played for Aberdeen, Manchester United and Oldham Athletic. He also played in 34 international matches for Scotland between 1971 and 1978 including at two World Cups. Buchan later managed Burnley.

== Playing career ==
=== Aberdeen ===
Buchan started his professional career with his hometown club Aberdeen. He captained the team when they won the 1970 Scottish Cup Final 3–1 against Jock Stein's Celtic.

=== Manchester United ===
Buchan was signed by Manchester United manager Frank O'Farrell on 29 February 1972 for £120,000, and at the time was the club's record signing. His first game for United came on 4 March 1972 against Tottenham in the First Division. He was unable to prevent United from suffering relegation to the Second Division in 1973–74. However, United bounced back at the first attempt as Second Division champions. Buchan became club captain in 1975 following the departure of Willie Morgan.

Buchan helped United win the 1977 FA Cup Final against Liverpool, which they won 2–1. This meant that Buchan became the only player to captain both Scottish and English FA Cup-winning sides. He also helped United reach another FA Cup final in 1979, where they lost 3–2 to Arsenal. He was still with United when they beat Brighton 4–0 in the replayed 1983 FA Cup Final, but he did not make the team for the final. Buchan left the club in August 1983 after injuries caught up with him, signing for Oldham Athletic on a free transfer. He had played in 456 games, scoring 4 goals, one of which was a superb, yet somewhat uncharacteristic, long-range drive against Everton.

=== International ===
Buchan won 34 caps for Scotland, making his international debut in 1971 against Portugal and his last appearance in 1978 against the same country. He played in the 1974 and 1978 World Cup finals and captained Scotland twice: in 1975 against Romania and in 1977 against Argentina.

== After playing ==
On 22 June 1985, Buchan was appointed manager of Burnley, who had just been relegated to the Fourth Division for the first time in their history – 25 years after being league champions. Buchan lasted less than four months at Turf Moor, resigning on 10 October 1985.

Buchan worked for the Professional Footballers' Association (PFA) in Manchester for 17 years before retiring in 2017.

== Personal life ==
Buchan's brother George and father Martin senior both played for Aberdeen, the latter only in unofficial competitions during World War II. His son Jamie played with Aberdeen, Dundee United and Partick Thistle.

== Career statistics ==
=== Club ===
Appearances and goals by club, season and competition
| Club | Season | League | | | National cup (Note: Includes Scottish Cup, FA Cup) | | League cup (Note: Includes Scottish League Cup, Football League Cup) | | Europe | | Other | | Total | |
| Club | Season | Division | Apps | Goals | Apps | Goals | Apps | Goals | Apps | Goals | Apps | Goals | Apps | Goals |
|---|---|---|---|---|---|---|---|---|---|---|---|---|---|---|
| Aberdeen | 1966–67 | Scottish Division One | 4 | 0 | 0 | 0 | 0 | 0 | – | | – | | 4 | 0 |
| Aberdeen | 1967–68 | Scottish Division One | 24 | 2 | 3 | 0 | 5 | 0 | 2 (Note: Appearances in European Cup Winners' Cup) | 1 | – | | 34 | 3 |
| Aberdeen | 1968–69 | Scottish Division One | 27 | 2 | 6 | 0 | 6 | 1 | 4 (Note: Appearances in Inter-Cities Fairs Cup) | 0 | – | | 43 | 3 |
| Aberdeen | 1969–70 | Scottish Division One | 19 | 2 | 5 | 0 | 0 | 0 | – | | – | | 24 | 2 |
| Aberdeen | 1970–71 | Scottish Division One | 34 | 2 | 4 | 0 | 6 | 0 | 2 | 0 | – | | 46 | 2 |
| Aberdeen | 1971–72 | Scottish Division One | 25 | 1 | 2 | 0 | 6 | 0 | 4 (Note: Appearances in UEFA Cup) | 0 | – | | 37 | 1 |
| Aberdeen | Total | | 133 | 9 | 20 | 0 | 23 | 1 | 12 | 1 | – | | 188 | 11 |
| Washington Whips (loan) | 1967 | United Soccer Association | 8 | 1 | – | | – | | – | | – | | 8 | 1 |
| Manchester United | 1971–72 | First Division | 13 | 1 | 2 | 0 | 0 | 0 | – | | – | | 15 | 1 |
| Manchester United | 1972–73 | First Division | 42 | 0 | 1 | 0 | 4 | 0 | 0 | 0 | – | | 47 | 0 |
| Manchester United | 1973–74 | First Division | 42 | 0 | 2 | 0 | 1 | 0 | – | | – | | 45 | 0 |
| Manchester United | 1974–75 | Second Division | 41 | 0 | 2 | 0 | 7 | 0 | – | | – | | 50 | 0 |
| Manchester United | 1975–76 | First Division | 42 | 0 | 7 | 0 | 3 | 0 | – | | – | | 52 | 0 |
| Manchester United | 1976–77 | First Division | 33 | 0 | 7 | 0 | 4 | 0 | 2 | 0 | – | | 46 | 0 |
| Manchester United | 1977–78 | First Division | 28 | 1 | 4 | 0 | 1 | 0 | 4 | 0 | 1 (Note: Appearance in FA Charity Shield) | 0 | 38 | 1 |
| Manchester United | 1978–79 | First Division | 37 | 2 | 9 | 0 | 2 | 0 | – | | – | | 48 | 2 |
| Manchester United | 1979–80 | First Division | 42 | 0 | 2 | 0 | 3 | 0 | – | | – | | 47 | 0 |
| Manchester United | 1980–81 | First Division | 26 | 0 | 2 | 0 | 2 | 0 | 2 | 0 | – | | 32 | 0 |
| Manchester United | 1981–82 | First Division | 27 | 0 | 1 | 0 | 2 | 0 | 0 | 0 | – | | 30 | 0 |
| Manchester United | 1982–83 | First Division | 3 | 0 | 0 | 0 | 1 | 0 | 2 | 0 | – | | 6 | 0 |
| Manchester United | Total | | 376 | 4 | 39 | 0 | 30 | 0 | 10 | 0 | 1 | 0 | 456 | 4 |
| Oldham Athletic | 1983–84 | Second Division | 28 | 0 | | 0 | | 0 | – | | – | | 30 | 0 |
| Career total | | | 545 | 14 | 59 | 0 | 53 | 1 | 22 | 1 | 1 | 0 | 682 | 16 |

=== International ===
Appearances and goals by national team and year
| National team | Year | Apps | Goals |
|---|---|---|---|
| Scotland | 1971 | 2 | 0 |
| Scotland | 1972 | 6 | 0 |
| Scotland | 1973 | 1 | 0 |
| Scotland | 1974 | 7 | 0 |
| Scotland | 1975 | 4 | 0 |
| Scotland | 1976 | 2 | 0 |
| Scotland | 1977 | 5 | 0 |
| Scotland | 1978 | 7 | 0 |
| Total | | 34 | 0 |

== Managerial record ==
| Team | From | To | Record | | | | |
| Team | From | To | P | W | L | D | Win % |
|---|---|---|---|---|---|---|---|
| Burnley | June 1985 | October 1985 | 13 | 5 | 2 | 6 | 38.46% |

== Honours ==
=== As a player ===
Aberdeen

- Scottish Cup: 1969–70

Manchester United

- Football League Second Division: 1974–75
- FA Cup: 1976–77; runner-up: 1975–76, 1978–79
- FA Charity Shield: 1977

== See also ==
- List of Scotland national football team captains
- List of Scottish football families
