= Garry Birtles =

English football player and manager (born 1956)

Personal information
- Date of birth: 27 July 1956 (age 70)
- Place of birth: Nottingham, England
- Height: 6 ft 0 in (1.83 m)
- Position: Forward

Youth career
- Long Eaton Rovers
- Long Eaton United

Senior career*
| Years | Team | Apps | (Gls) |
| 1976–1980 | Nottingham Forest | 87 | (32) |
| 1980–1982 | Manchester United | 58 | (11) |
| 1982–1987 | Nottingham Forest | 125 | (38) |
| 1987–1988 | Notts County | 33 | (9) |
| 1989–1991 | Grimsby Town | 69 | (9) |
| Total | | 402 | (99) |

International career
| 1979–1980 | England U21 | 2 | (1) |
| 1980 | England B | 1 | (0) |
| 1980 | England | 3 | (0) |

Managerial career
- 1997–1999: Gresley Rovers
- * Club domestic league appearances and goals

Garry Birtles (born 27 July 1956) is an English retired professional footballer who played as a forward in the Football League between the 1970s and 1990s. He is best known for his time at Nottingham Forest, during which he won the 1979 and 1980 European Cup Finals. He was also capped three times by England. He is the cousin of actress Sherrie Hewson.

== Club career ==
=== Nottingham Forest ===
Birtles was signed by Nottingham Forest from non-league Long Eaton United for £2,000. He made his Forest debut as a winger in March 1977 in the old Second Division against Hull City. His second competitive first team appearance was not until 18 months later in September 1978. Peter Withe had been sold to Newcastle and Steve Elliott failed to make the grade. This allowed Birtles a chance that he grasped. He scored his first goal for the club in his third match, a first round 1978–79 European Cup tie against holders Liverpool. Birtles kept his place for the rest of the season capping his success with two goals in the 3–2 win over Southampton in the 1979 League Cup Final. He also won a 1979 European Cup winner's medal via the 1–0 victory over Malmö FF of Sweden in Munich's Olympic Stadium. He scored 14 times in the league alone that season.

He gained another winner's medal in the following season's European Cup against Hamburg providing the return pass from which John Robertson scored the only goal. Birtles also played in every First Division game for Forest that season scoring 12 goals.

He began the 1980–81 season in fine form, scoring six goals in nine league games for Forest, before a £1.25 million fee took him to Manchester United.

=== Manchester United ===
Under manager Dave Sexton, Birtles made his debut for Manchester United in a First Division victory over Stoke City at the Victoria Ground on 22 October 1980. He made 28 appearances in his first season with the club.

He scored his first league goal for United in the 1981–82 season, and went on to score 11 times for them that season.

His Manchester United spell ended where it began – against Stoke City. His final appearance for them came on the last day of the season, when they beat the Potters 2–0 at Old Trafford. He began the 1982–83 season still with Manchester United, but was not selected for a first team game, and returned to play for Nottingham Forest.

=== Return to Forest ===
His second tenure at Forest included a spell at centre-half. However, he still proved himself to be a competent goalscorer, particularly with 15 league goals in the 1983–84 season and 14 in the 1986–87 season, the last of which he was joint top goalscorer alongside midfield star Neil Webb and up-and-coming striker Nigel Clough. However, Forest manager Brian Clough allowed Birtles to part from the club on a free transfer in June 1987.

=== Notts County and Grimsby Town ===
He spent 18 months with Notts County, during which he appeared in almost every league game. Birtles ended his career with Grimsby Town. They won two successive promotions during his time there, and by the end of his career he had accumulated more than 400 professional league appearances.

== International career ==
During the final months of his first spell at Nottingham Forest, when he was still reputed as one of the English league's finest strikers, he was capped three times at senior level for England. His first cap came on 13 May 1980 in a 3–1 friendly win over Argentina. His last came on 15 October that year in a 2–1 defeat against Romania in a 1982 World Cup qualifier.

== Career statistics ==
Appearances and goals by club, season and competition
| Club | Season | League | | | FA Cup | | League Cup | | Europe | | Other | | Total | |
| Club | Season | Division | Apps | Goals | Apps | Goals | Apps | Goals | Apps | Goals | Apps | Goals | Apps | Goals |
|---|---|---|---|---|---|---|---|---|---|---|---|---|---|---|
| Nottingham Forest | 1976–77 | Second Division | 1 | 0 | 0 | 0 | 0 | 0 | — | | 0 | 0 | 1 | 0 |
| Nottingham Forest | 1977–78 | First Division | 0 | 0 | 0 | 0 | 0 | 0 | — | | — | | 0 | 0 |
| Nottingham Forest | 1978–79 | First Division | 35 | 14 | 3 | 0 | 6 | 5 | 9 (Note: Appearances in European Cup) | 6 | 0 | 0 | 50 | 25 |
| Nottingham Forest | 1979–80 | First Division | 42 | 12 | 2 | 1 | 9 | 1 | 9 | 2 | 2 (Note: Appearances in European Super Cup) | 0 | 64 | 16 |
| Nottingham Forest | 1980–81 | First Division | 9 | 6 | 0 | 0 | 3 | 3 | 2 | 0 | 0 | 0 | 14 | 9 |
| Nottingham Forest | Total | | 87 | 32 | 5 | 1 | 18 | 9 | 20 | 8 | 2 | 0 | 129 | 50 |
| Manchester United | 1980–81 | First Division | 25 | 0 | 3 | 1 | 0 | 0 | — | | — | | 28 | 1 |
| Manchester United | 1981–82 | First Division | 33 | 11 | 1 | 0 | 2 | 0 | — | | — | | 36 | 11 |
| Manchester United | Total | | 58 | 11 | 4 | 1 | 2 | 0 | — | | — | | 64 | 12 |
| Nottingham Forest | 1982–83 | First Division | 25 | 7 | 1 | 0 | 4 | 4 | — | | — | | 30 | 11 |
| Nottingham Forest | 1983–84 | First Division | 34 | 16 | 1 | 0 | 1 | 0 | 7 (Note: Appearances in UEFA Cup) | 0 | — | | 43 | 16 |
| Nottingham Forest | 1984–85 | First Division | 13 | 2 | 2 | 0 | 0 | 0 | 0 | 0 | — | | 15 | 2 |
| Nottingham Forest | 1985–86 | First Division | 25 | 0 | 2 | 2 | 3 | 0 | — | | — | | 30 | 2 |
| Nottingham Forest | 1986–87 | First Division | 28 | 14 | 0 | 0 | 5 | 1 | — | | — | | 33 | 15 |
| Nottingham Forest | Total | | 125 | 39 | 6 | 2 | 13 | 5 | 7 | 0 | — | | 151 | 46 |
| Notts County | 1987–88 | Third Division | 43 | 7 | 2 | 1 | 2 | 0 | — | | 9 | 1 | 56 | 9 |
| Notts County | 1988–89 | Third Division | 20 | 2 | 2 | 0 | 4 | 1 | — | | 0 | 0 | 26 | 3 |
| Notts County | Total | | 63 | 9 | 4 | 1 | 6 | 1 | — | | 9 | 1 | 82 | 12 |
| Grimsby Town | 1989–90 | Fourth Division | 38 | 8 | 3 | 0 | 3 | 1 | — | | 2 | 0 | 46 | 9 |
| Grimsby Town | 1990–91 | Third Division | 23 | 1 | 1 | 0 | 0 | 0 | — | | 0 | 0 | 24 | 1 |
| Grimsby Town | 1991–92 | Second Division | 8 | 0 | 1 | 0 | 2 | 1 | — | | 1 | 0 | 12 | 1 |
| Grimsby Town | Total | | 69 | 9 | 5 | 0 | 5 | 2 | — | | 3 | 0 | 82 | 11 |
| Career total | | | 402 | 100 | 24 | 5 | 44 | 17 | 27 | 8 | 14 | 1 | 511 | 131 |

== Honours ==
Nottingham Forest

- Football League Cup: 1978–79; runner-up: 1979–80
- European Cup: 1978–79, 1979–80
- European Super Cup: 1979

Grimsby Town

- Lincolnshire Senior Cup: 1989–90

Individual

- Nottingham Forest Player of the Year: 1978–79
- Bravo Award: 1979
- Grimsby Town Supporters Player of the Year: 1989–90
