= Mickey Thomas (footballer) =

Welsh footballer

Personal information
- Full name: Michael Reginald Thomas
- Date of birth: 7 July 1954 (age 72)
- Place of birth: Mochdre, Wales
- Height: 5 ft 6 in (1.68 m)
- Position: Winger

Senior career*
Years	Team	Apps	(Gls)
1972–1978	Wrexham	230	(33)
1978–1981	Manchester United	90	(11)
1981	Everton	10	(0)
1981–1982	Brighton & Hove Albion	20	(0)
1982–1984	Stoke City	57	(14)
1984–1985	Chelsea	44	(9)
1985–1986	West Bromwich Albion	20	(0)
1986	→ Derby County (loan)	9	(0)
1986–1988	Wichita Wings	76	(28)
1988–1989	Shrewsbury Town	40	(1)
1989–1990	Leeds United	3	(0)
1990–1991	Stoke City	46	(7)
1991–1993	Wrexham	34	(2)
1994	Porthmadog	?	(?)
Total		679	(105)

International career
1976–1986	Wales	51	(4)

Managerial career
- 1994: Porthmadog
- * Club domestic league appearances and goals

Michael Reginald Thomas (born 7 July 1954) is a Welsh former footballer who played as a winger. At club level, he played for Wrexham, Manchester United, Everton, Brighton & Hove Albion, Stoke City, Chelsea, West Bromwich Albion, Derby County, Shrewsbury Town and Leeds United. As a Welsh international, he made 51 appearances and scored four goals.

Thomas began his career with local side Wrexham where he spent eight seasons and earned a move to Manchester United in 1978. After three seasons at Old Trafford, Thomas had short spells at Everton and Brighton & Hove Albion before joining Stoke City in August 1982. After one and a half seasons at the Victoria Ground, he moved on to Chelsea, with whom he helped gain promotion in 1983–84. He then played for West Bromwich Albion and Derby County and also spent two years in the United States playing indoor football for Wichita Wings. He moved back to England in 1988 to play for Shrewsbury Town and Leeds United before making returns to Stoke City and Wrexham.

== Playing career ==
Thomas was born in Mochdre, Conwy, Wales, and was among a group of notable footballers to come out of North West Wales during the 1970s and 1980s. Local factory Quinton Hazell bought him a pair of boots when he was at school in the mid-1960s, and at the age of 13 Thomas was a success as left wing on the factory's Conwy League men's team. By 15, he and friend Joey Jones were taken on by Wrexham. Though the first two years were spent cleaning boots, the changing rooms and the whole stadium, Thomas made his first-team debut in the 1971–72 season, when still only 17. Under manager John Neal he helped Wrexham establish their giant-killing reputation by reaching the quarter finals of the FA Cup in 1974 and the quarter finals of the European Cup Winners' Cup in 1976, when they lost to the eventual winners, Anderlecht of Belgium. After helping Wrexham storm to the Third Division title in 1977–78, Thomas crossed the border to England and joined Manchester United. He played 110 games and scored 15 goals for the Red Devils, collecting an FA Cup runners-up medal in 1979.

He then moved to Everton in August 1981 but lasted just three months at Everton, his contract terminated by manager Howard Kendall in the autumn of 1981 after he refused to play in the reserves. He moved to Brighton & Hove Albion where he saw out the 1981–82 season but his wife struggled to settle in Brighton and so he moved on again this time to Stoke City for a fee of £200,000. He instantly became a favourite at the Victoria Ground and top-scored in 1982–83 with 12 goals coming from left wing and he won the player of the year award. In the summer of 1983 manager Richie Barker decided to alter his style of play to the long ball game. This decision did not go down well with the players and most of them signalled their intent to leave and Thomas left in January 1984, after scoring three goals in 21 matches in 1983–84.

He joined promotion-chasing Chelsea in January 1984, signed by the manager who had given him his debut at Wrexham, John Neal. Thomas made an immediate impact, scoring twice on his debut and helping the club become Second Division champions in 1983–84. He was sold to West Bromwich Albion in 1985 for £100,000 where he played 28 times scoring once and also had a short loan spell at Derby County. In 1986 Thomas moved to the United States where he lent his skills to the Wichita Wings in the Major Indoor Soccer League. After two seasons in the United States he returned to England with Shrewsbury Town and Leeds United before making a return to Stoke City in March 1990. He could do little to prevent Alan Ball's Stoke suffering relegation in 1989–90 but at the age of 36 he played in 44 matches in 1990–91 and won the player of the year award again as Stoke failed to mount a promotion challenge. He was released at the end of the season by Lou Macari and returned to Wrexham in 1991, where in the memorable FA Cup defeat of Arsenal in January 1992, 37-year-old Thomas scored the equalising goal from a free kick.

He joined Welsh League side Porthmadog in 1994 under the management of former Wales international teammate Ian Edwards. When Edwards was sacked Thomas took over as a player-manager however in his three months in charge the side only picked up one point and Thomas decided to leave.

== International career ==
Thomas gained 51 caps for Wales, and counts scoring a goal for Wales in their win over England as one of the most memorable moments of his career.

== Personal life ==
During his football career, Thomas became involved in a counterfeit currency scam, whereby he laundered the money through Wrexham's trainees. North Wales Police arrested him in 1993 and following a conviction he was sentenced to 18 months in jail.

In August 1992, Thomas was attacked by two men in a country lane at Dyserth, Clwyd. He was sitting in his Volkswagen with a 29-year-old woman, when his window was smashed and he was assaulted with a hammer and a screwdriver. Thomas was admitted to hospital with 15 stab wounds to his left buttock, back, and left leg.

In February 2019, Thomas made public that he had stomach cancer.

== After football ==
Thomas never played at senior level after his imprisonment, although he did continue playing for a while at non-league level with Porthmadog and Amlwch Town in Wales, until he finally retired from playing in 1995 at the age of 41. Thomas later provided analysis on all Manchester United matches on "Total Football" on Key 103 and Piccadilly Magic 1152. He also worked as an after-dinner speaker.

== Career statistics ==
=== Club ===
Appearances and goals by club, season and competition
Club	Season	League			FA Cup		League Cup		Other^{[A]}		Total	
Club	Season	Division	Apps	Goals	Apps	Goals	Apps	Goals	Apps	Goals	Apps	Goals
Wrexham	1971–72	Third Division	20	3	0	0	0	0	0	0	20	3
Wrexham	1972–73	Third Division	26	0	2	1	2	0	4	0	32	1
Wrexham	1973–74	Third Division	19	4	3	0	1	0	0	0	23	4
Wrexham	1974–75	Third Division	31	5	0	0	1	0	0	0	32	5
Wrexham	1975–76	Third Division	30	2	2	0	3	0	4	0	39	2
Wrexham	1976–77	Third Division	45	6	6	0	5	2	0	0	56	8
Wrexham	1977–78	Third Division	43	7	9	1	6	0	0	0	58	8
Wrexham	1978–79	Second Division	16	6	0	0	3	0	2	0	21	6
Wrexham	Total		230	33	22	2	21	2	10	0	283	37
Manchester United	1978–79	First Division	25	1	8	1	0	0	0	0	33	2
Manchester United	1979–80	First Division	35	8	2	0	3	2	0	0	40	10
Manchester United	1980–81	First Division	30	2	3	1	2	0	2	0	37	3
Manchester United	Total		90	11	13	2	5	2	2	0	110	15
Everton	1981–82	First Division	10	0	0	0	1	0	0	0	11	0
Brighton & Hove Albion	1981–82	First Division	20	0	3	1	0	0	0	0	23	1
Stoke City	1982–83	First Division	41	11	3	0	2	1	0	0	46	12
Stoke City	1983–84	First Division	16	3	0	0	5	0	0	0	21	3
Stoke City	Total		57	14	3	0	7	1	0	0	67	15
Chelsea	1983–84	Second Division	17	4	0	0	0	0	0	0	17	4
Chelsea	1984–85	First Division	27	5	3	0	7	2	0	0	37	7
Chelsea	Total		44	9	3	0	7	2	0	0	54	11
West Bromwich Albion	1985–86	First Division	20	0	2	1	5	0	1	0	28	1
Derby County (loan)	1985–86	Third Division	9	0	0	0	0	0	0	0	9	0
Shrewsbury Town	1988–89	Second Division	40	1	1	0	1	0	0	0	42	1
Leeds United	1989–90	Second Division	3	0	0	0	0	0	0	0	3	0
Stoke City	1989–90	Second Division	8	0	0	0	0	0	0	0	8	0
Stoke City	1990–91	Third Division	38	7	3	0	3	0	1	0	45	7
Stoke City	Total		46	7	3	0	3	0	1	0	53	7
Wrexham	1991–92	Fourth Division	26	1	5	2	2	0	1	0	33	3
Wrexham	1992–93	Third Division	8	1	1	0	1	0	0	0	10	0
Wrexham	Total		34	2	6	2	3	0	1	0	43	3
Career Total			603	77	56	8	53	7	16	0	728	92

A. The "Other" column constitutes appearances and goals in the Full Members Cup, Football League Trophy, UEFA Cup, UEFA Cup Winners' Cup.

=== International ===
National team	Year	Apps	Goals
Wales	1976	2	0
Wales	1977	5	0
Wales	1978	5	1
Wales	1979	5	0
Wales	1980	4	1
Wales	1981	5	0
Wales	1982	6	0
Wales	1983	8	1
Wales	1984	5	1
Wales	1985	5	0
Wales	1986	1	0
Total		51	4

== Honours ==
Wrexham

- Football League Third Division: 1977–78
- Football League Fourth Division promotion: 1992–93
- Welsh Cup: 1974–75, 1977–78

Manchester United

- FA Cup runner-up: 1978–79

Chelsea

- Football League Second Division: 1983–84

Individual

- Stoke City Player of the Year: 1983, 1991
