= Steve Coppell =

English footballer & manager (born 1955)

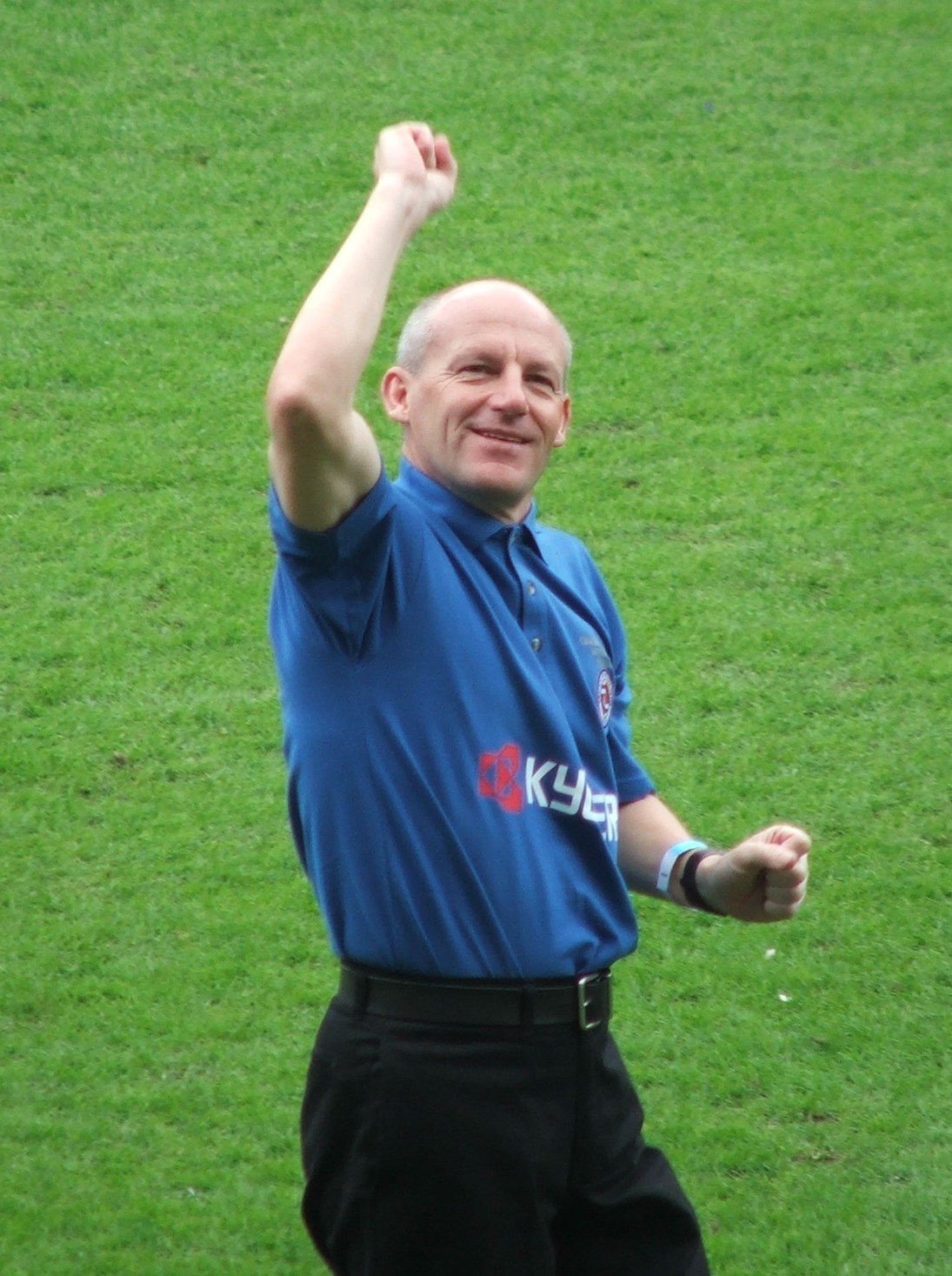
- Coppell as Reading manager in 2006

Personal information
- Full name: Stephen James Coppell
- Date of birth: 9 July 1955 (age 71)
- Place of birth: Liverpool, England
- Height: 5 ft 6 in (1.68 m)
- Position: Right winger

Senior career*
Years	Team	Apps	(Gls)
1973–1975	Tranmere Rovers	38	(10)
1975–1983	Manchester United	322	(54)
Total		360	(64)

International career
1976	England U23	1	(0)
1977–1983	England	42	(7)

Managerial career
- 1984–1993: Crystal Palace
- 1995–1996: Crystal Palace
- 1996: Manchester City
- 1997–1998: Crystal Palace
- 1999–2000: Crystal Palace
- 2001–2002: Brentford
- 2002–2003: Brighton & Hove Albion
- 2003–2009: Reading
- 2010: Bristol City
- 2012–2013: Crawley Town (director of football)
- 2013–2014: Portsmouth (director of football)
- 2016–2017: Kerala Blasters
- 2017–2018: Jamshedpur
- 2018–2019: ATK
- * Club domestic league appearances and goals

Stephen James Coppell (born 9 July 1955) is an English professional football manager and former player.

As a player, Coppell was a highly regarded right winger known for his speed, technical ability and work rate. He won domestic honours with Manchester United and represented England at the World Cup. After a knee injury ended his playing career, he went into management.

Coppell has managed several English clubs, most notably Crystal Palace and Reading, both of which he took from the English second tier to achieve each club's greatest-ever successes in the top flight. He has also managed Manchester City, Bristol City, Brighton & Hove Albion and Brentford. He is credited with discovering Ian Wright, a striker he signed from non-league football, and who became a household name and international footballer.

== Playing career ==
=== Early days ===
Coppell attended Quarry Bank High School in south Liverpool, where musician John Lennon, footballer Joe Royle, and writer and filmmaker Clive Barker had previously been pupils. Just one year ahead of Coppell were Les Dennis and Brian Barwick, the chief executive of the FA from January 2005 until the end of 2008.

Coppell was a nippy, incisive wide player in his youth but despite interest from some top clubs, he chose to join lower league Merseyside club Tranmere Rovers as he wanted to study for a degree in economic history at the University of Liverpool.

By 1974, Coppell was playing for Tranmere, studying for his degree and coaching the university team. But in 1975 his life changed when Manchester United made an offer of £60000 for him. His prospective new club instantly offered to double his wage and Coppell signed.

Coppell was able to complete his degree while playing on the right wing for Manchester United, making his debut as a substitute in a 4–0 win over Cardiff City on 1 March 1975, as his new club stormed back to the First Division after a season in the Second. Coppell ended that season with ten games and one goal.

The following season, Coppell played 39 times and scored ten goals, one of which was at the Kop end of his boyhood club Liverpool's Anfield ground. He also won honours for the England under-23 team.

The young Manchester United team put together by manager Tommy Docherty progressed in the First Division and reached the 1976 FA Cup Final, where they were favourites to beat Southampton, who were from the Second Division. But Southampton won the final 1–0.

Afterwards, Coppell said: "I didn't feel too bad, as I appreciated being in the FA Cup final at all. It was only afterwards I realised it might have been the only chance I'd ever get. But the next season gave me another go."

In 1977, Manchester United fell short in the League but reached the FA Cup Final again, where this time they played Liverpool, who were chasing a "treble" of First Division championship, FA Cup and European Cup. Liverpool had already won the title by the time the two sides met at Wembley, but it was Manchester United who performed on the day and won 2–1. Coppell was one of nine United players in the team who had lost in the final to Southampton the year before.

=== Representing England ===
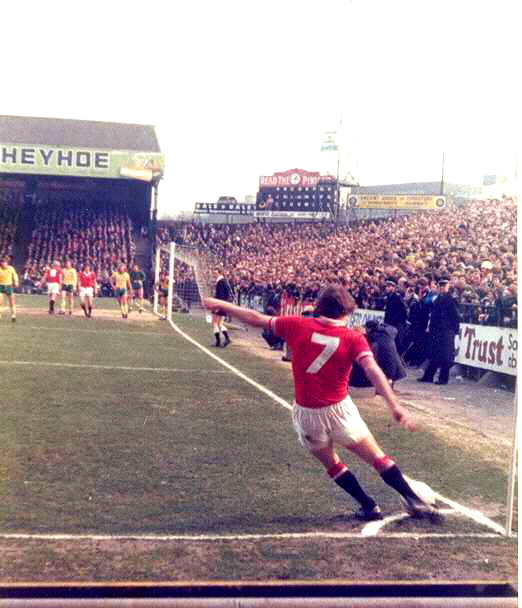
Coppell taking a corner kick for Manchester United in 1979

Later in 1977, Coppell received a call-up to the England team for the country's final qualifying game for the 1978 FIFA World Cup against Italy at Wembley. Coppell played and England won 2–0 but the damage had been done earlier in the campaign and England did not qualify for the finals in Argentina. Coppell stayed in the plans of new England coach Ron Greenwood, playing in a number of friendly matches through 1978 and scoring the only goal of the game – his first for England – in a victory over Scotland at Hampden Park.

Coppell remained a constant for club and country over the next 12 months, scoring for his country against Czechoslovakia and Northern Ireland while also adding goals from the wing for Manchester United, who reached another FA Cup final in 1979 following a season during which Coppell did not miss a game. Arsenal beat Manchester United 3–2 in the final.

A week later, Coppell had a better experience at Wembley as he scored one and made another as England beat Scotland 3–1. He continued to impress for his country while also remaining an ever-present for Manchester United for the next two years. His habit of scoring against Scotland continued in 1980 with a goal in a 2–0 win at Hampden prior to the 1980 European Championships, during which he featured in the opening two group matches, though England failed to progress further.

=== Injury ===
Tragedy struck Coppell while playing for England in a vital qualifier for the 1982 FIFA World Cup against Hungary. Coppell was the victim of a vicious high challenge from József Tóth which shattered his knee. Coppell said the effect was "like someone had put a firework in my knee and it had gone off" and underwent an operation which allowed him a temporary fix so he could carry on playing.

Coppell nursed the injury through the 1982 World Cup in Spain, playing in all three of England's group games and the goalless draw against West Germany in the second pool. England went out in the next game against Spain and Coppell underwent a second operation.

He continued to play for Manchester United as much as he could after suffering the injury, playing 36 times in the 1981–82 season and 29 times in the 1982–83 campaign. He made two more appearances for England after the World Cup ended, scoring in the former as England beat Luxembourg 9–0.

Coppell was fit enough to play in the League Cup final of 1983 which – in a reverse of events in 1977 – opponents Liverpool won 2–1. But as Manchester United progressed also to the FA Cup final in the same year, Coppell's knee had broken down again and he missed the final against Brighton & Hove Albion, which ended 2–2 and ultimately concluded in a 4–0 victory for Manchester United in the replay.

Another operation followed but to no avail, and Coppell announced his retirement from the game in October 1983, aged just 28. He had broken the record for the most consecutive appearances for an outfield Manchester United player – 207 from 1977 to 1981 – which still stands to this day. His Manchester United career ended with 373 appearances and 70 goals; his England career had concluded with 42 caps and seven goals. He also scored the quickest recorded goal at under 18 level in a cup final against Notts County. The goal time was 12 seconds.

He has since stated that he recently discovered, thanks to advances in technology, that his ACL had only been connected at one end since the tackle, something which had been missed in previous surgeries. He has now had his ACL removed.

== Managerial career ==
=== Crystal Palace (first spell; 1984–1993) ===
In June 1984, Coppell became manager of Crystal Palace. Aged just 28 years and 10 months upon his appointment, he became one of the youngest men to ever manage a club in the Football League. Coppell made budget signings of unwanted players from the First Division, as well as signing Ian Wright from non-league football. The club's fortunes greatly improved, and Palace won promotion to the top flight through the play-offs in 1989. Palace reached the FA Cup final in 1990, losing to Manchester United in a replay, after Coppell's inspired substitution of bringing on Ian Wright nearly won the first game for Palace. Their semi-final victory over Liverpool helped make up for the horrific 9–0 drubbing that they had received in a league match at Anfield early in the season.

The following season, Crystal Palace finished in third place in the top flight (their highest ever league finish) and won the Full Members Cup. The club's fortunes declined after that, and in May 1993, Coppell resigned after they were relegated from the Premier League. However, his name was linked with the England national coach's job six months later when Graham Taylor resigned, but he swiftly ruled out any interest in the job. In May 1994, he was also linked with the manager's job at Middlesbrough, but the job went to his former Manchester United teammate Bryan Robson instead.

=== Crystal Palace (second spell; 1995–1996) ===
Coppell returned to Palace in June 1995 as Director of Football, with Ray Lewington and Peter Nicholas working alongside him as first team coaches. In February 1996, Dave Bassett was appointed manager and the club reached the final of the First Division Play-offs where they lost 2–1 to Leicester City after extra time.

=== Manchester City (1996) ===
Coppell left Palace in October 1996 to become manager of Manchester City, a job that he would quit after only six games and 33 days in charge. He cited the pressure of the job as his reason for leaving the club. His reign at the club is the shortest of any City manager to date.

=== Crystal Palace (third spell; 1997–1998) ===
After leaving Manchester City, Coppell returned to Palace as Chief Scout. Following the resignation of manager Dave Bassett in February 1997, Coppell was promoted once again to the role of manager. He secured another promotion via the play-offs after only 6 months in the job, and he remained in charge of the club for the first seven months of the 1997–98 season. Despite signing the likes of Attilio Lombardo and Tomas Brolin, Crystal Palace struggled. With relegation confirmed, a boardroom takeover by Palace fan Mark Goldberg led to him again becoming Director of Football, with Terry Venables being appointed first team manager.

=== Crystal Palace (fourth spell; 1999–2000) ===
Following the resignation of manager Terry Venables in January 1999, Coppell once again returned as the manager of Palace. By that time the club had severe financial problems. High earners like Venables and Lombardo had been removed to try and cut spending, and the club was close to going bankrupt. With relegation seeming a realistic possibility, he guided the club to respectable finishes of 14th and 15th in the league. In the 2000 close season Simon Jordan bought the club and replaced Coppell with Alan Smith, who had taken over from Coppell on his first resignation seven years earlier. Jordan said Coppell had done a "fantastic job", but the club needed to "evolve or die".

All in all, Coppell's exploits in SE25, from promotion to the Cup Final, to third place, even to First Division survival, made him a favourite, and in 2005, he was voted as the manager for Palace's Centenary XI.

=== Brentford (2001–2002) ===
Coppell was appointed manager of Brentford in 2001 by his former Palace chairman, Ron Noades. It was Brentford's best ever start to a season, losing only once in their first 10 matches, and that was to Sir Bobby Robson's Newcastle United side at St James' Park. Coppell's side spent most of the season behind Brighton & Hove Albion and Reading in the table. Coppell took them to the Division Two play-off final in 2002 after they had narrowly missed out on automatic promotion, conceding a late equaliser to Coppell's future side Reading in the end-of-season decider. They lost in the play-off final to Stoke City. After this, Coppell resigned, citing the club's lack of finances.

=== Brighton & Hove Albion (2002–2003) ===
After a brief stint as assistant manager to Andy King at Swindon Town, Coppell took over as manager at Brighton. He fell asleep during his initial job interview, but after a poor start to the season by a Brighton side managed by Martin Hinshelwood, Coppell was given a second chance and took it. Brighton were struggling in Division One and on a 10 match losing streak.

During Coppell's first match, Brighton fans were accused of racially taunting referee Phil Prosser after he awarded two penalties against them, which helped Neil Warnock's Sheffield United come from 2–1 behind to win. The police, stewards accompanying Mr Prosser and Sheffield United player Peter Ndlovu, who the referee also claimed was abused, all stated that they did not hear any racist abuse. No evidence was found to support Prosser's claim and the FA took no further action.

Coppell did get an emotional return to Palace, being applauded into his dugout, despite taking charge of Palace's arch-rivals in the game. Palace won the match 5–0. Some Brighton fans accused Coppell of deliberately capitulating which he denied.

Although their performances improved, they were relegated on the final day of the season, five points behind Stoke.

In the next season, Brighton pushed hard for promotion, but Coppell received a job offer from Reading, which he accepted, despite the Seagulls topping the Division Two table. Coppell cited the apparent lack of progress on the Falmer stadium project, which was a major factor in his decision to join the club. Without a modern stadium, Coppell felt Brighton had little chance of getting to the Premier League, which was where Coppell wanted to be managing. Reading had recently completed the Madejski Stadium, making them an ideal employer.

=== Reading (2003–2009) ===
On 9 October 2003, Coppell was appointed manager of Reading, succeeding West Ham bound Alan Pardew (who had played under Coppell at Palace, in the late 1980s and early 1990s, and had scored 'that' goal against Liverpool, in the FA Cup Semi-final). His first season in charge, 2003–04, was somewhat hampered by the season's transfer budget already having been spent by his predecessor. His second season in charge began well, and Reading raced to second place in the Championship but a run of eleven matches without a win between Boxing Day 2004 and the 3–1 home victory over Pardew's West Ham United on 12 March 2005 helped end their hopes of promotion as they finished seventh, narrowly missing out on a playoff place.

Reading dominated the Championship in the 2005–06 season, setting a new league record of 33 league games unbeaten between the opening day defeat by Plymouth Argyle and the loss at Luton Town in February; these were the only league defeats the team would suffer that season. On 25 March 2006 they clinched promotion to the top flight for the first time in their 135-year history thanks to a 1–1 draw away to Leicester City. Coppell's team secured the league title in the following week, with a 5–0 drubbing of Derby County, and they would go on to set a new English league record for the number of points won in a season, with 106. Following such an outstanding season in charge of Reading, Coppell was voted League Managers Association's Manager of the Year for both the Championship and the entire league, and he also topped the Tissot League For Managers' Performance.

On 26 March 2007, Coppell broke with his usual tradition and signed a new two-year contract to keep him as Reading's manager until the end of the 2008–09 season. Coppell is well known for not voicing controversial opinions, but he broke with this habit on 9 April 2007, when he accused Charlton's Talal El Karkouri of cheating and faking a "death roll" to get Leroy Lita sent off after Lita appeared to headbutt him. Lita received a 3 match ban for the incident.

Reading finished their first season in the English top flight in eighth place, just one point short of UEFA Cup qualification. In recognition of this performance, Coppell won the Manager of the Year award for the second season in succession. Speaking earlier in the season, Manchester United manager Sir Alex Ferguson said of Coppell: "I think it's totally deserved. It's a marvellous contribution he's made. And what's encouraging for the Premiership is that it's mostly British-based players in his side, with some Irish players thrown in. I think that says a lot for the way he has gathered his team together".

Reading's second season was not as good as their first season and it ended in relegation back to the Championship. Coppell said he would consider his future as Reading manager. However, at a press conference on 20 May 2008 he cited the fans as an important factor in committing his future to the club for the 2008–09 season. Unusually for a club just relegated, Reading fans were so concerned that Coppell may feel honour-bound to resign that they launched a successful protest to convince Coppell to stay at the club.

Their initial form was promising, with Reading playing the free flowing football that got them promoted in record-breaking fashion in 2005–06. Reading equalled their highest win under Coppell with a 6–0 victory over Sheffield Wednesday. They also beat the then league leaders Wolves 3–0 at Molineux. The latter half of the season was less impressive however, particularly at home where they failed to win a single match after January. Eventually they finished the league in 4th place after failing to secure a win against Birmingham that would have seen them promoted automatically. In Coppell's final game in charge, Reading lost their playoff semi-final against Burnley. He resigned as manager immediately after the game.

=== Bristol City (2010) ===
On 22 April 2010 Coppell was named as the new manager of Bristol City, with former caretaker manager Keith Millen staying on as his assistant. He began a 12-month rolling contract with the club on 11 May 2010 but, on 11 August 2010 after only four months in charge, Coppell resigned as Bristol City manager, saying that he would retire from football management altogether citing a lack of passion for the job.

However, on 9 September 2011 he said he was interested in becoming the next manager of Iceland. He had previously coached Icelandic players Brynjar Gunnarsson, Ívar Ingimarsson and Gylfi Sigurðsson.

=== Crawley Town (2012–2013) ===
On 10 April 2012, Coppell was announced as the Director of Football at Crawley Town. The appointment was made days after previous manager Steve Evans left to manage Rotherham United, with former assistant manager Craig Brewster placed in temporary charge. Coppell continued in his role when Richie Barker was appointed as the new manager. On 2 December 2013, following the departure of Barker, Coppell left his position as director of football.

=== Portsmouth (2013–2014) ===
After the dismissal of Guy Whittingham on 25 November, Portsmouth appointed Richie Barker as the new manager. Coppell joined his former Crawley Town colleague as director of football on 9 December, with the club sitting 17th in the table. On 27 March 2014, following the departure of Barker, Coppell left his position.

=== Kerala Blasters (2016) ===
On 21 June 2016, Coppell was announced as the manager of Kerala Blasters FC in 2016 Indian Super League. His team secured a spot in the finals after finishing second in the league matches with 22 points.

Kerala Blasters lost the final in spite of getting the lead as ATK came from behind and then won on penalties by 4–3 in Kerala's home stadium.

On 12 July 2017, it was announced that Coppell would not return to the Kerala Blasters for the 2017–18 season.

=== Jamshedpur FC (2017–2018) ===
On 14 July 2017, it was announced that Coppell would become the first head coach of the ISL side Jamshedpur.

=== ATK (2018–19) ===
After spending just one season with Jamshedpur, Coppell moved again to another Indian Super League club, ATK, on 18 June 2018.

His new season with ATK started with a 2–0 defeat to his former club Kerala Blasters, coached by David James. ATK finished sixth and failed to reach the playoffs again. In the Indian Super Cup 2019 ATK reached the semi-finals but lost to Chennaiyin FC. Coppell was sacked after the defeat.

== Career statistics ==
=== Club ===
Appearances and goals by club, season and competition
Club	Season	League			FA Cup		League Cup		Continental		Other		Total	
Club	Season	Division	Apps	Goals	Apps	Goals	Apps	Goals	Apps	Goals	Apps	Goals	Apps	Goals
Tranmere Rovers	1973–74	Third Division	9	0	0	0	0	0	—		—		9	0
Tranmere Rovers	1974–75	Third Division	29	10	4	1	3	0	—		—		36	11
Tranmere Rovers	Total		38	10	4	1	3	0	0	0	0	0	45	11
Manchester United	1974–75	Second Division	10	1	—		—		—		—		10	1
Manchester United	1975–76	First Division	39	4	7	0	3	1	—		—		49	5
Manchester United	1976–77	First Division	40	6	7	1	5	1	4 (Note: Appearances in UEFA Cup)	0	—		56	8
Manchester United	1977–78	First Division	42	5	4	1	1	0	4 (Note: Appearances in European Cup Winners' Cup)	3	1 (Note: Appearance in FA Charity Shield)	0	52	9
Manchester United	1978–79	First Division	42	11	9	1	2	0	—		—		53	12
Manchester United	1979–80	First Division	42	8	2	0	2	1	—		—		46	9
Manchester United	1980–81	First Division	42	6	3	0	2	0	2	0	—		49	6
Manchester United	1981–82	First Division	36	9	0	0	2	0	—		—		38	9
Manchester United	1982–83	First Division	29	4	4	1	8	6	2	0	—		43	11
Manchester United	Total		322	54	36	4	25	9	12	3	1	0	396	70
Career total			360	64	40	5	28	9	12	3	1	0	441	81

=== International ===
Appearances and goals by national team and year
National team	Year	Apps	Goals
England	1977	1	0
England	1978	9	2
England	1979	8	3
England	1980	9	1
England	1981	7	0
England	1982	7	1
England	1983	1	0
Total		42	7

Scores and results list England's goal tally first, score column indicates score after each Coppell goal.

List of international goals scored by Steve Coppell
No.	Date	Venue	Opponent	Score	Result	Competition
1	20 May 1978	Hampden Park, Glasgow, Scotland	Scotland	1–0	1–0	1977–78 British Home Championship
2	29 November 1978	Wembley Stadium, London, England	Czechoslovakia	1–0	1–0	Friendly
3	19 May 1979	Windsor Park, Belfast, Northern Ireland	Northern Ireland	2–0	2–0	1978–79 British Home Championship
4	26 May 1979	Wembley Stadium, London, England	Scotland	2–1	3–1	1978–79 British Home Championship
5	13 June 1979	Praterstadion, Vienna, Austria	Austria	2–3	3–4	Friendly
6	24 May 1980	Hampden Park, Glasgow, Scotland	Scotland	2–0	2–0	1979–80 British Home Championship
7	15 December 1982	Wembley Stadium, London, England	Luxembourg	2–0	9–0	UEFA Euro 1984 qualification

== Managerial statistics ==
As of 10 February 2018

Team	Years	Record				
Team	Years	P	W	D	L	Win %
Crystal Palace	1984–93	442	179	113	150	40.5
Crystal Palace	1995–96	32	9	14	9	28.1
Manchester City	1996	6	2	1	3	33.33
Crystal Palace	1997–98	51	16	13	22	31.4
Crystal Palace	1999–2000	71	19	26	26	26.8
Brentford	2001–02	54	27	12	15	50.0
Brighton & Hove Albion	2002–03	49	18	14	17	36.7
Reading	2003–09	282	125	68	89	44.3
Bristol City	2010	2	0	0	2	0.0
Kerala Blasters	2016	17	7	4	6	41.2
Jamshedpur	2017–2018	20	8	5	7	40.0
ATK	2018–19	21	8	6	7	38.1
Total		1,047	418	276	353	39.9

== Honours ==
=== As a player ===
Manchester United

- Football League Second Division: 1974–75
- FA Cup: 1976–77; runner-up: 1975–76, 1978–79
- FA Charity Shield: 1977 (shared)
- Football League Cup runner-up: 1982–83

=== As a manager ===
Crystal Palace

- Football League First / Second Division play-offs: 1989, 1997
- Full Members' Cup: 1990–91
- FA Cup runner-up: 1989–90

Reading

- Football League Championship: 2005–06

Individual

- Premier League Manager of the Month: September 2006, November 2006
- Football League Championship Manager of the Month: December 2008
- Inducted into LMA Hall of Fame 1000 Club: 2008
- Football League Championship Manager of the Year: March 2006
- LMA Manager of the Year: 2006, 2007
- Football League Championship Manager of the Month: October 2005, November 2005
- Football League Second Division Manager of the Month: October 2001

== See also ==
- List of football managers with the most matches
