= Arthur Albiston =

Scottish footballer

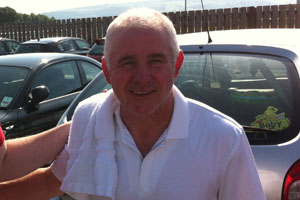
- Albiston in 2013

Personal information
- Full name: Arthur Richard Albiston
- Date of birth: 14 July 1957 (age 69)
- Place of birth: Edinburgh, Scotland
- Height: 5 ft 7 in (1.70 m)
- Position: Left-back

Youth career
- 1972–1974: Manchester United

Senior career*
Years	Team	Apps	(Gls)
1974–1988	Manchester United	379	(6)
1988–1989	West Bromwich Albion	43	(2)
1989–1991	Dundee	10	(0)
1990	→ Chesterfield (loan)	3	(1)
1991–1993	Chester City	68	(0)
1992	→ Molde (loan)	15	(3)
1993	Molde	9	(0)
1993–1994	Ayr United	1	(0)
1994	Sittingbourne	0	(0)
1994	Witton Albion		
1994	Droylsden		
Total		528	(12)

International career
1976–1977	Scotland U21	5	(0)
1982–1986	Scotland	14	(0)

Managerial career
- 1996–1997: Droylsden
- * Club domestic league appearances and goals

Arthur Richard Albiston (born 14 July 1957) is a Scottish former footballer. Albiston played for Manchester United for most of his career, making almost 500 appearances for the club. He also made 14 international appearances for Scotland and was selected for their 1986 FIFA World Cup squad.

== Career ==
Albiston joined Manchester United as an apprentice in July 1972, turning professional in July 1974. He made his debut in a League Cup Third Round match against local rivals Manchester City in 1974. He made 485 appearances in 14 years, playing at left back, and scored six goals. He helped the club win the FA Cup in 1977, 1983 and 1985.

Albiston left Manchester United in August 1988 for West Bromwich Albion, managed by ex-Red Devils boss Ron Atkinson, on a free transfer. By the time of his departure from Old Trafford he was the longest-serving player at the squad and the only player remaining from the Tommy Docherty era. Albiston was also the earliest-debuting player to appear for Manchester United under Alex Ferguson, beginning a 51-year period in which the club always had in its squad a player who would appear or had appeared under Ferguson, which only came to an end with the retirement of Jonny Evans in May 2025.

Albiston made his Albion debut in a league match away at Leicester City early in the 1988–89 season, and went on to make 47 appearances and score two goals that season, after which he returned to his homeland to sign for Dundee, and went on to play for Chesterfield, Chester City, Molde in Norway and Ayr United. He retired from senior football in 1994.

In his professional career, he made 464 appearances and scored seven goals. He also later joined non-League sides Sittingbourne, Witton Albion and Droylsden.

Albiston also earned 14 caps for Scotland, making his debut on 28 April 1982 against Northern Ireland. His total includes one game at the 1986 FIFA World Cup, a 0–0 draw against Uruguay on 13 June 1986.

Following his retirement from playing, Albiston managed Droylsden (1996–97), was a junior coach at Manchester United (2000–04) and has also worked as a radio summariser for Manchester Independent. He works for MUTV, Manchester United's official television channel, acting as match summariser during live coverage of the club's reserve and academy teams.

== Career statistics ==
=== Club ===
Appearances and goals by club, season and competition
Club	Season	League			National cup (Note: Includes FA Cup, Norwegian Cup)		League cup (Note: Includes Football League Cup, Scottish League Cup)		Continental		Other		Total	
Club	Season	Division	Apps	Goals	Apps	Goals	Apps	Goals	Apps	Goals	Apps	Goals	Apps	Goals
Manchester United	1974–75	Second Division	2	0	0	0	1	0	—		—		3	0
Manchester United	1975–76	First Division	3	0	0	0	0	0	—		—		3	0
Manchester United	1976–77	First Division	17	0	1	0	4	0	3 (Note: Appearances in UEFA Cup)	0	—		25	0
Manchester United	1977–78	First Division	28	0	4	0	1	0	4 (Note: Appearances in European Cup Winners' Cup)	0	1 (Note: Appearance in FA Charity Shield)	0	38	0
Manchester United	1978–79	First Division	33	0	7	0	2	0	—		—		42	0
Manchester United	1979–80	First Division	25	0	0	0	3	0	—		—		28	0
Manchester United	1980–81	First Division	42	1	3	0	2	0	2	0	—		49	1
Manchester United	1981–82	First Division	42	1	1	0	2	0	—		—		45	1
Manchester United	1982–83	First Division	38	1	7	0	9	1	2	0	—		56	2
Manchester United	1983–84	First Division	40	2	1	0	6	0	8	0	1	0	56	2
Manchester United	1984–85	First Division	39	0	7	0	3	0	8	0	—		57	0
Manchester United	1985–86	First Division	37	1	5	0	3	0	—		3 (Note: One appearance in FA Charity Shield, two appearances in Screen Sport Super Cup)	1	48	1
Manchester United	1986–87	First Division	22	0	0	0	4	0	—		—		26	0
Manchester United	1987–88	First Division	11	0	0	0	0	0	—		—		11	0
Manchester United	Total		379	6	36	0	40	1	27	0	5	0	487	7
West Bromwich Albion	1988–89	Second Division	43	2	2	0	1	0	—		1 (Note: Appearance in Full Members' Cup)	0	47	2
Dundee	1989–90	Scottish Premier Division	10	0	0	0	2	0	—		—		12	0
Dundee	1990–91	Scottish First Division	0	0	0	0	0	0	—		—		0	0
Dundee	Total		10	0	0	0	2	0	0	0	0	0	12	0
Chesterfield (loan)	1990–91	Fourth Division	3	1	1	0	—		—		1 (Note: Appearance(s) in Associate Members' Cup / Football League Trophy)	0	5	1
Chester City	1991–92	Third Division	44	0	2	0	4	0	—		1	0	51	0
Chester City	1992–93	Second Division	24	0	0	0	0	0	—		2	0	26	0
Chester City	Total		68	0	2	0	4	0	0	0	3	0	77	0
Molde (loan)	1992	Tippeligaen	15	3	1	0	—		—		—		16	3
Molde	1993	Tippeligaen	9	0	0	0	—		—		1 (Note: Appearance in Tippeligaen Relegation play-offs)	0	10	0
Molde	Total		24	3	1	0	0	0	0	0	1	0	26	3
Ayr United	1993–94	Scottish First Division	1	0	0	0	—		—		—		1	0
Career total			528	12	42	0	47	1	27	0	11	0	655	13

=== International ===
Appearances and goals by national team and year
National team	Year	Apps	Goals
Scotland	1982	1	0
Scotland	1983	3	0
Scotland	1984	5	0
Scotland	1985	3	0
Scotland	1986	2	0
Total		14	0

== Honours ==
=== As a player ===
Manchester United

- Football League Second Division: 1974–75
- FA Cup: 1976–77, 1982–83, 1984–85; runner-up: 1978–79
- FA Charity Shield: 1977 (shared), 1983
- Football League Cup runner-up: 1982–83
