= Ashley Grimes (footballer, born 1957) =

Irish footballer

Personal information
- Full name: Augustine Ashley Grimes
- Date of birth: 2 August 1957 (age 69)
- Place of birth: Dublin, Republic of Ireland
- Height: 5 ft 11 in (1.80 m)
- Positions: Midfielder; left-back

Youth career
- Stella Maris

Senior career*
Years	Team	Apps	(Gls)
1974–1977	Bohemians		(3)
1977–1983	Manchester United	90	(10)
1983–1984	Coventry City	32	(1)
1984–1989	Luton Town	87	(3)
1989–1991	Osasuna	15	(0)
1991–1992	Stoke City	10	(1)
Total		234	(18)

International career
1978–1979	Republic of Ireland U21	6	(2)
1978–1988	Republic of Ireland	18	(1)
- * Club domestic league appearances and goals

Augustine Ashley Grimes (born 2 August 1957) is an Irish former footballer. He played for Manchester United, Coventry City, Luton Town, Stoke City and Osasuna (Spain). He won 18 caps for the Republic of Ireland and scored one goal, a long-range strike against Spain in a Euro 84 qualifier at Lansdowne Road in November 1982.

== Career ==
On 8 March 1978 at Dalymount Park, Dublin, Grimes played in the first ever Republic of Ireland U21 game; he went on to win six under-21 caps, scoring two goals, both from penalty kicks. Grimes, who played as a defender and midfielder, began his career with junior side Villa United before joining Stella Maris Football club. He had a trial with Manchester United in August 1972, but returned to Bohemians. After a second trial, he joined Manchester United in March 1977 for £35,000.

Between 1977 and 1983, Grimes made 107 first-team appearances and scored 11 goals for Manchester United, where he won an FA Cup-winner's medal as a non-playing substitute in the 1983 final against Brighton. He subsequently joined Coventry City for a fee of £200,000. After only one season he moved to Luton Town where he made 117 appearances and scored 4 goals. In 1988, he won a League Cup winners medal, coming on a substitute and crossing the ball to set up Luton's last-minute winning goal as they achieved a shock 3–2 victory over Arsenal to secure the first major trophy in their history.

In 1989, he joined Osasuna, making his La Liga debut on 8 November 1989 against Celta Vigo. Grimes played 15 games for CA Osasuna in total before returning to England to play for Stoke City where he made 15 appearances in 1991–92.

He retired from playing in May 1992 and became youth team manager at Stoke and Celtic under Lou Macari and later at Huddersfield Town. He joined the coaching staff at Welsh side Colwyn Bay in February 2013.

== Career statistics ==
=== Club ===
Sourced from Ashley Grimes at the English National Football Archive (subscription required)

Club	Season	League			FA Cup		League Cup		Other^{[A]}		Total	
Club	Season	Division	Apps	Goals	Apps	Goals	Apps	Goals	Apps	Goals	Apps	Goals
Manchester United	1977–78	First Division	13	2	1	0	1	0	2	0	17	2
Manchester United	1978–79	First Division	16	0	3	1	2	0	0	0	21	1
Manchester United	1979–80	First Division	26	3	0	0	1	0	0	0	27	3
Manchester United	1980–81	First Division	8	0	0	0	0	0	2	0	10	0
Manchester United	1981–82	First Division	11	1	0	0	0	0	0	0	11	1
Manchester United	1982–83	First Division	16	2	1	0	2	0	2	0	21	2
Manchester United	Total		90	10	5	1	6	0	6	0	107	11
Coventry City	1983–84	First Division	32	1	0	0	3	1	0	0	35	2
Luton Town	1984–85	First Division	9	0	0	0	2	0	0	0	11	0
Luton Town	1985–86	First Division	3	0	1	0	1	0	0	0	5	0
Luton Town	1986–87	First Division	31	2	5	0	0	0	0	0	36	2
Luton Town	1987–88	First Division	32	1	5	0	4	1	4	0	45	2
Luton Town	1988–89	First Division	12	0	0	0	5	0	0	0	17	0
Luton Town	Total		87	3	11	0	12	1	4	0	114	4
Osasuna	1989–90	La Liga	15	0	0	0	0	0	0	0	15	0
Osasuna	1990–91	La Liga	0	0	0	0	0	0	0	0	0	0
Osasuna	Total		15	0	0	0	0	0	0	0	15	0
Stoke City	1991–92	Third Division	10	1	0	0	0	0	5	0	15	1
Career total			234	15	16	1	21	2	15	0	286	18

A. The "Other" column constitutes appearances and goals in the Full Members Cup, Football League Trophy, Football League play-offs, UEFA Cup and UEFA Cup Winners' Cup.

=== International ===
National team	Year	Apps	Goals
Republic of Ireland	1978	3	0
Republic of Ireland	1979	3	0
Republic of Ireland	1980	2	0
Republic of Ireland	1981	3	0
Republic of Ireland	1982	2	1
Republic of Ireland	1983	1	0
Republic of Ireland	1984	2	0
Republic of Ireland	1987	1	0
Republic of Ireland	1988	1	0
Total		18	1

== Honours ==
Bohemians

- League of Ireland: 1974–75
- League of Ireland Cup: 1974–75
- FAI Cup: 1975–76

Manchester United

- FA Cup: 1982–83

Luton Town

- Football League Cup: 1987–88; runner-up: 1988–89
- Full Members' Cup runner-up: 1987–88

Stoke City

- Associate Members' Cup: 1991–92
