= Darren Ryan =

English footballer (born 1972)

Personal information
- Date of birth: 3 July 1972 (age 54)
- Place of birth: Oswestry, England
- Position: Midfielder

Team information
- Current team: Dubai Irish (Head of Youth Development)

Senior career*
Years	Team	Apps	(Gls)
1990–1992	Shrewsbury Town	4	(0)
1992–1993	Chester City	17	(2)
1993–1994	Stockport County	36	(6)
1994–1996	Rochdale	32	(2)
1996	Chester City	4	(1)
1996–1998	Barry Town	70	(28)
1998–1999	Total Network Solutions	31	(4)
1999–2001	Merthyr Tydfil	?	(?)
2000	→ Newport County (loan)	6	(1)
2001–2002	Newport County	31	(1)
2002–2003	Carmarthen Town	22	(1)
2003–2005	Haverfordwest County	42	(8)
2005	Cardiff Grange Quins	4	(1)
2005–2009	Newtown	27	(1)

Managerial career
- 2006–2010: Newtown
- 2011: Airbus UK
- 2011: Newtown
- * Club domestic league appearances and goals as of 00:20, 11 February 2010 (UTC)

Darren Ryan (born 3 July 1972) is an English former footballer. He is currently Head of Youth Development at UAE Third Division League club Dubai Irish.

== Career ==
Ryan began his professional career with Shrewsbury Town, as he progressed through the youth system and made four Football League appearances for them from 1990 to 1992. He later had two spells with Chester City and also played for Stockport County and Rochdale before drifting out of the English Football League in 1996. He has since become an established figure in Welsh football, through clubs including a successful period with professional club Barry Town and later Total Network Solutions and Newtown. He replaced his former Chester teammate Roger Preece as Newtown manager in October 2006. He remained with the club for four years, stepping down in August 2010. He joined Airbus UK as manager in March 2011 before returning to Newtown in June, but quit after just seventeen days in charge to become First Team Coach at Northwich Victoria.

He resigned from the club on 16 January 2012 along with the rest of Andy Preece's management, with the club reporting that Preece was expected to be appointed Director of Football at Welsh Premier League side Airbus UK Broughton the next day. The next day he was appointed as Head Coach at Airbus UK.

Ryan initially joined the Wolverhampton Wanderers Academy on a part-time basis before being appointed Under-18s coach in July 2017.

In July 2025, Ryan joined UAE Third Division League club Dubai Irish in the role of Head of Youth Development.
