= Tom Connell (footballer) =

Association footballer from Northern Ireland

Personal information
- Full name: Thomas Eugene Connell
- Date of birth: 25 November 1957 (age 68)
- Place of birth: Newry, Northern Ireland
- Position: Defender

Senior career*
Years	Team	Apps	(Gls)
- Newry Town
1975-1978	Coleraine		
1978-1982	Manchester United	2	(0)
1982-1987	Glentoran		
1987-1989	Portadown		

International career
1978	Northern Ireland	1	(0)
- * Club domestic league appearances and goals

Thomas Eugene Connell (born 25 November 1957) is a Northern Irish former footballer, who played as a defender.

Born in Newry, he played for Newry Town, Manchester United, Coleraine, Portadown and Glentoran.
