= Scott McGarvey =

Scottish footballer

Personal information
- Full name: Scott Thomas McGarvey
- Date of birth: 22 April 1963 (age 63)
- Place of birth: Glasgow, Scotland
- Height: 6 ft 0 in (1.83 m)
- Position: Forward

Senior career*
Years	Team	Apps	(Gls)
1980–1984	Manchester United	35	(5)
1984	→ Wolverhampton Wanderers (loan)	13	(2)
1984–1986	Portsmouth	28	(9)
1986	→ Carlisle United (loan)	20	(6)
1986–1987	Carlisle United	35	(12)
1987–1988	Grimsby Town	65	(14)
1988–1989	Bristol City	33	(14)
1989–1990	Oldham Athletic	14	(3)
1989	→ Wigan Athletic (loan)	23	(6)
1990–1992	Mazda	25	(12)
1992–1993	Aris Limassol	32	(15)
Total		323	(98)

International career
1981–1983	Scotland U21	15	(6)
- * Club domestic league appearances and goals

Scott Thomas McGarvey (born 22 April 1963) is a Scottish former footballer who played as a forward.

McGarvey played for Manchester United, and made his debut for the Red Devils on 13 September 1980. Between 1980 and 1983 he made 35 appearances for the club and 12 as a substitute, scoring 5 goals. Left in July 1984 for a sum of £85,000.

Wolverhampton Wanderers, Portsmouth, Bristol City, Carlisle United, Grimsby Town, Oldham Athletic, Derry City of the League of Ireland, non-league Witton Albion and Mazda SC in the Japan Soccer League, Aris Limassol in Cypriot First Division were McGarvey's other clubs. Scott is now managing director of Readies Limited.
