= Nikola Jovanović (footballer, born 1952) =

Montenegrin footballer

Personal information
- Full name: Nikola Jovanović
- Date of birth: 18 September 1952 (age 74)
- Place of birth: Cetinje, PR Montenegro, FPR Yugoslavia
- Height: 6 ft 3 in (1.91 m)
- Position: Defender

Senior career*
Years	Team	Apps	(Gls)
1972–1975	Budućnost Titograd		
1975–1979	Red Star Belgrade	75	(1)
1980–1982	Manchester United	21	(4)
1981–1982	→ Budućnost Titograd (loan)	12	(1)
1982–1984	Budućnost Titograd		

International career
1979–1982	Yugoslavia	7	(0)

Managerial career
- 2003-2007: Domžale (sports dir)
- 2013-: Budućnost Podgorica (sports dir)
- * Club domestic league appearances and goals

Nikola Jovanović (Cyrillic: Никола Joвaнoвић; born 18 September 1952) is a retired Montenegrin footballer. Representing Yugoslavia during his career, he is known for being second player from outside the British Isles and Ireland to join Manchester United. The first player was Carlo Sartori. He is now a sports director of FK Budućnost Podgorica.

== Club career ==
Jovanović was one of the most successful players of, then Yugoslav, giant Red Star, Belgrade, Serbia where he played as a defender and had an impressive overall record of 359 matches and 50 goals for the Red Star team. He then made history when he became the first Yugoslav footballer to play for leading English league side Manchester United, where he made 21 Football League appearances in the early 1980s after being signed by manager Dave Sexton. In addition, he was the first non-British Isles or Irish player to be signed by the club — Italian-born Carlo Sartori, who played for United during the 1960s and 1970s, moved to Manchester as a child and came through the club's youth system. Before signing for Manchester United he turned down an offer from Bayern Munich and decided in favour of the English side. In January 1980, Manchester United made Jovanović one of the club's most expensively signed players at the time by paying £300,000 for his services to Red Star (it was Red Star's and Yugoslav First League record transfer fee at the time). However, his time at Old Trafford was short lived and he failed to justify his transfer fee. By the end of his first season he began suffering from chronic back pain and before long was on his way back to his native Yugoslavia. After being injured for almost two seasons he retired at the age of 31. Before he returned to Yugoslavia, he went to Hong Kong joined Sea Bees football team from quarter 4 1982 to February 1983.

== International career ==
Jovanović made his debut for Yugoslavia in an April 1979 European Championship qualification away against Cyprus and has earned a total of 7 caps, scoring no goals. He was part of the squad at the 1982 FIFA World Cup and his final international was a June 1982 World Cup match against Honduras in Zaragoza.

== Personal life ==
Born in Cetinje, present day Montenegro, he resides with his family in Mengeš, Slovenia. He has worked as sports director at Slovenian club NK Domžale and was offered jobs as Montenegrin national team coach and as sports director at former club Budućnost. He took up the latter role in summer 2013.
