= 1977 FA Cup final =

1977 FA Cup Final
- Match programme cover
- Event: 1976–77 FA Cup
Liverpool	Manchester United
1	2
- Date: 21 May 1977
- Venue: Wembley Stadium, London
- Referee: Bob Matthewson (Bolton)
- Attendance: 99,252

The 1977 FA Cup final was the final match of the 1976–77 FA Cup, the 96th season of England's premier cup football competition. The match was played on 21 May 1977 at Wembley Stadium, London, and it was contested by Liverpool and Manchester United. United won the game 2–1. All three goals came in a five-minute period early in the second half. Stuart Pearson opened the scoring when he latched onto a long ball forward and drove a hard shot past Ray Clemence. Liverpool equalised through Jimmy Case soon after, as he turned and hooked a right foot half-volley into the top corner, giving Stepney no chance. However, just three minutes later, United regained the lead when Lou Macari's shot deflected off teammate Jimmy Greenhoff's chest and looped into the net past Clemence and Phil Neal on the line. Jimmy Greenhoff's brother Brian was also in the United line-up, making them the first pair of brothers to play in a winning FA Cup final team since George and Ted Robledo played for Newcastle United in 1952.

Liverpool had already won the league title, which meant Manchester United qualified for the 1977–78 European Cup Winners' Cup regardless of the result. Liverpool then won the European Cup just four days later, so United's victory prevented them from becoming the first English club to win the continental treble of League, FA Cup, and European Cup titles; United would achieve this feat instead 22 years later.

For Tommy Docherty, this was his first FA Cup final win in four attempts: he had lost as a player with Preston in 1954, as a manager with Chelsea in 1967 and with Manchester United in 1976.

== Match details ==
21 May 1977
15:00 BST

Liverpool	1–2	Manchester United
Case 53'	Report	Pearson 51'; J. Greenhoff 55'

Wembley Stadium, London
Attendance: 99,252
Referee: Bob Matthewson (Lancashire)

Liverpool	Manchester United

GK	1	(England) Ray Clemence
RB	2	(England) Phil Neal
LB	3	(Wales) Joey Jones
CB	4	(England) Tommy Smith
MF	5	(England) Ray Kennedy
CB	6	(England) Emlyn Hughes (c)
FW	7	(England) Kevin Keegan
MF	8	(England) Jimmy Case
MF	9	(Republic of Ireland) Steve Heighway
FW	10	(England) David Johnson	(substituted off) 64'
MF	11	(England) Terry McDermott
Substitute:
MF	12	(England) Ian Callaghan	(substituted on) 64'
Manager:
(England) Bob Paisley

GK	1	(England) Alex Stepney
RB	2	(Northern Ireland) Jimmy Nicholl
LB	3	(Scotland) Arthur Albiston
CM	4	(Northern Ireland) Sammy McIlroy
CB	5	(England) Brian Greenhoff
CB	6	(Scotland) Martin Buchan (c)
RM	7	(England) Steve Coppell
CF	8	(England) Jimmy Greenhoff
CF	9	(England) Stuart Pearson
CM	10	(Scotland) Lou Macari
LM	11	(England) Gordon Hill	(substituted off) 81'
Substitute:
MF	12	(Northern Ireland) David McCreery	(substituted on) 81'
Manager:
(Scotland) Tommy Docherty

Match officials

- Assistant referees:
  - Clive White
  - R. Rodell
- Fourth official: C. J. Riley

Match rules

- 90 minutes
- 30 minutes of extra-time if necessary
- Replay if scores still level
- One named substitute
