= Tom Sloan (footballer, born 1959) =

Northern Irish footballer

Personal information
- Full name: Thomas Sloan
- Date of birth: 10 July 1959 (age 67)
- Place of birth: Ballymena, County Antrim, Northern Ireland
- Position: Midfielder

Senior career*
Years	Team	Apps	(Gls)
1977–1978	Ballymena United	40	(1)
1978–1982	Manchester United	11	(0)
1982–1983	Chester	44	(3)
1983–1986	Linfield	66	(12)
1987–1988	Carrick Rangers F.C.		
1989–1990	Coleraine F.C.	41	(5)
1991–1992	Larne F.C.		
1993–1995	Raglan Homers F.C.		

International career
1978	Northern Ireland U21	1	(0)
1979	Northern Ireland	3	(0)
- * Club domestic league appearances and goals

Thomas Sloan (born 10 July 1959) is a Northern Irish ex-footballer who played as a midfielder in both Northern Ireland and England in the late 1970s, the 1980s and even the early 1990s.

Born in Ballymena, County Antrim, Sloan began his football career with his local club, Ballymena United. In 1978, he was part of the Ballymena United team that reached the final of the Irish Cup only to lose to Linfield. His role as a key player in that team earned him a selection for the Northern Irish under-21 team for a match against the Republic of Ireland.

That summer, Manchester United and Tottenham Hotspur were locked in a battle for Sloan's signature, but it was United who eventually won out, paying Ballymena United £20,000 for the transfer. Sloan's influence in the heart of the United midfield was not sufficient for him to earn a regular place in the team, but his four appearances in his first season at Old Trafford were enough to attract a call from the Northern Irish senior team at the end of the season. In the space of 15 days, Sloan won his only three caps; two came in the 1979 British Home Championship, against Scotland and Wales, while the other was a UEFA Euro 1980 qualifying match against Denmark.

Sloan's involvement with the Manchester United first team gradually decreased over the next three seasons – he made just eight appearances in total in 1979–80 and 1980–81, and none at all in 1981–82 – and he was released to Chester in July 1982. At Chester, Sloan found his niche, making nearly 50 appearances in the one season he spent there before he returned to Northern Ireland to play for Linfield.

After a three-year stint with Linfield, he was transferred to Carrick Rangers f.c. and then moved on to Coleraine for a further season before moving to his last Irish league club Larne FC. He then got reinstated as an amateur and returned to his first amateur club; Raglan Homers in the Ballymena Sunday Morning League.
