= Paddy Roche =

Irish footballer

Personal information
- Full name: Patrick Joseph Christopher Roche
- Date of birth: 4 January 1951 (age 75)
- Place of birth: Dublin, Ireland
- Height: 6 ft 1 in (1.85 m)
- Position: Goalkeeper

Senior career*
Years	Team	Apps	(Gls)
1970–1973	Shelbourne	100	(1)
1973–1982	Manchester United	46	(0)
1982–1984	Brentford	71	(0)
1984–1989	Halifax Town	189	(0)
1989–1990	Chester City		
- Northwich Victoria

International career
1971–1975	Republic of Ireland	8	(0)
- * Club domestic league appearances and goals

Patrick Joseph Christopher Roche (born 4 January 1951) is an Irish former football goalkeeper.

Born in Dublin, Roche started his career with Shelbourne with whom he won the first of his eight full international caps. During his time with Shelbourne he made 100 League of Ireland appearances and scored one league goal. He was on the losing side in the 1973 FAI Cup Final as they lost to Cork Hibernians in a replay. He transferred to Manchester United in 1973 for a fee of £15,000.

Roche made 46 league appearances for United, largely playing second-fiddle to Alex Stepney and then Gary Bailey. In 1982, he transferred to Brentford, before joining Halifax Town two years later. He moved on in 1989 after 184 Football League appearances for the Shaymen, briefly spending time with Chester City as cover for Billy Stewart. However, he left after failing to make any first-team appearances for the Cheshire side. Once retired, he returned to Halifax to take on a role coaching youngsters for their Football in the Community scheme.

Roche's brother Willie played for St. Patrick's Athletic and his nephew Paul played for University College Dublin.

Roche played 8 games for the Republic of Ireland national football team, keeping three clean sheets.
