= United Kingdom 2035 FIFA Women's World Cup bid =

Football World Cup host nation bid

England, Northern Ireland, Scotland, Wales bid
- for the 2035 FIFA Women's World Cup

Bid details
- Bidding nation: England, Northern Ireland, Scotland, Wales
- Bidding federation: FA, IFA, SFA, FAW
- Proposed venues: 22 (in 16 cities)

The United Kingdom bid for the 2035 FIFA Women's World Cup is a joint bid to host the 2035 FIFA Women's World Cup by the football associations of England, Northern Ireland, Scotland, and Wales. The bid was announced on 3 April 2025. The slogan of the bid is titled: "All Together".

== Background ==
In May 2023, The Football Association announced their intention to bid following the success of their women's team at the UEFA Women's Euro 2022 and the large attendance at Wembley Stadium for the 2022 Women's FA Cup final. This would be England's first time hosting the women's tournament, though they have significant hosting experience including the 1963 UEFA U-18, 1966 FIFA World Cup, 1983 UEFA U-18, 1993 UEFA U-18, UEFA Euro 1996, 2001 UEFA U-16, 2018 UEFA U-17, and several matches of UEFA Euro 2020. A bid alongside Scotland, Wales, Ireland and Northern Ireland similar to their successful UEFA Euro 2028 bid was also proposed. The home nations of the United Kingdom (England, Northern Ireland, Scotland, and Wales) pushed their bid from 2031 to 2035 following the confirmation of hosting restrictions on 5 March 2025. On 3 April 2025, FIFA declared the United Kingdom bid the sole valid bid for 2035. Due to UEFA's boycott of FIFA competitions due to the FIFA Forward Enterprise proposal, it is unknown if an alternative host, which would have to be from CAF, will be selected if the boycott is maintained by the 10th Extraordinary FIFA Congress on 23 November 2026, when the hosts will be officially announced.

England have previously hosted the FIFA World Cup in 1966, while Scotland had hosted matches for the UEFA Euro in 2020. England, Scotland and Wales will co-host the UEFA Euro in 2028 along with the Republic of Ireland.

== Proposed venues ==
Shortlisted locations

In its hosting requirements document, FIFA stipulated that the 32-team competition will have a minimum of eight stadiums—of which at least five were existing venues. The stadiums would have minimum seating capacities of 20,000 for most matches, 40,000 for semifinal matches, and 65,000 for the opening match and final. However, additional changes will be made to accommodate the expansion to 48.

Manchester United have expressed interest in hosting this final in their yet-to-be built 100,000 seater stadium, though reports have indicated the FA prefers Wembley Stadium. Other interested cities currently include Belfast, Birmingham, Brighton and Hove, Bristol, Cardiff, Edinburgh, Glasgow, Leeds, Liverpool, London, Newcastle upon Tyne, Nottingham, Sunderland, and Wrexham.

No venue in Northern Ireland currently meets the minimum capacity requirement, with the largest existing stadium, Windsor Park, having only 18,500 capacity. Plans for the redevelopment of Casement Park into a 34,500 capacity venue for the UEFA Euro 2028 were stalled and resulted in Northern Ireland withdrawing from hosting the tournament.

On 28 November 2025, the formal bid submission proposed 22 venues in 16 cities, including some planned and provisional stadiums. It's not known yet how many venues will be used for the tournament. The bid submission also highlights that 63 million people live within two hours of any proposed venue.

List of host cities and stadiums
Country	City	Stadium	Capacity	Image
England	London	Wembley Stadium	90,000	
England	London	Tottenham Hotspur Stadium	62,850	
England	London	Emirates Stadium	60,704	
England	London	Stamford Bridge (Note: Provisional, the stadium does not meet FIFA’s technical requirements, and will either be renovated or moved to a newly built stadium.)	40,022	
England	London	Selhurst Park	25,486 (to be renovated)	
England	Manchester	Old Trafford (Note: Provisional, may switch to New Trafford Stadium.)	74,197	
England	Manchester	Etihad Stadium	61,470 (after renovation)	
England	Birmingham	New Birmingham City Stadium	62,000	
England	Birmingham	Villa Park	50,000 (after renovation)	
England	Leeds	Elland Road	53,000 (after renovation)	
England	Liverpool	Hill Dickinson Stadium	52,769	
England	Newcastle	St James' Park	52,305	
England	Sunderland	Stadium of Light	49,000	
England	Brighton & Hove	American Express Stadium	31,876	
England	Nottingham	City Ground	30,404 (to be renovated)	
England	Bristol	Ashton Gate	26,462	
Northern Ireland	Belfast	Windsor Park	18,500 (to be renovated)	
Scotland	Glasgow	Hampden Park	51,866	
Scotland	Edinburgh	Easter Road	20,421	
Wales	Cardiff	Millennium Stadium	73,931	
Wales	Cardiff	Cardiff City Stadium	33,280	
Wales	Wrexham	Racecourse Ground	15,500 (to be renovated)	

== See also ==
- 2035 FIFA Women's World Cup
- England women's national football team
- Northern Ireland women's national football team
- Scotland women's national football team
- Wales women's national football team
