= New Trafford Stadium =

Planned football stadium in Trafford, England

- Wembley of the North
- Interactive map of New Trafford Stadium
- Location: Old Trafford; Greater Manchester, England; M16 0RA
- Coordinates: 53.463333°N 2.296667°W
- Owner: Manchester United
- Operator: Manchester United
- Capacity: 100,000

Construction
- Cost: £2 billion (estimated)
- Architect: Foster + Partners

New Trafford Stadium is the name given by the architects Foster + Partners to a potential new stadium for Manchester United that would replace Old Trafford, their home stadium since 1910.

In 2025 the club announced plans designed by Foster + Partners for a 100,000-seater stadium under a canopy. Manchester United hope to move to the stadium in time for the 2030–31 football season. Foster + Partners referred to the new stadium as "New Trafford Stadium" in a fact sheet, while the club is officially designating the project as "Old Trafford Regeneration".

The area around the stadium is likely to be subject to regeneration and development, possibly involving a public–private partnership. Jim Ratcliffe said that the construction would depend on "how quickly the government get going with their regeneration programme". Omar Berrada, the chief executive of Manchester United, said that "the stadium in isolation doesn't make sense without the wider regeneration project". The Chancellor of the Exchequer, Rachel Reeves, said in January 2025 that she supported the regeneration of the area around Old Trafford.

== Location ==
The new stadium will be built next to Old Trafford, approximately 350m to the north west of the current stadium.

== History ==
In 2021, Manchester United looked into redeveloping Old Trafford, having not done any major work since 2006. In 2023, the stadium was left off the list for hosting UEFA Euro 2028 matches, due to being unable to say whether it would be available for the competition. The stadium had a roof leak against Arsenal in May 2024, with similar occurrences in 2012, 2019 and 2023.

In February 2024, Sir Jim Ratcliffe purchased a 27.7% stake in Manchester United. In the same month, Trafford Council announced plans to redevelop the area around Old Trafford as part of the Trafford Wharfside Development Framework. Following his purchase, Ratcliffe stated that he wanted to see a "national stadium in the north of England", rather than refurbish the existing stadium as it would not be perfect. A taskforce made up of Lord Coe, Andy Burnham, Gary Neville, Sara Todd, academics and members of a fans group explored whether to renovate the existing stadium or construct a new one. When fans were surveyed, 52% were in favour of a new stadium rather than redevelopment. In September 2024, the first images of the new stadium were published and it was reported that it could bring in £7.3 billion each year to the UK economy.

The Mayor of Greater Manchester, Andy Burnham, said that no public money would fund the stadium. The area around the stadium is likely to be subject to regeneration and development, possibly involving a public–private partnership. Ratcliffe said that the construction would depend on "how quickly the government get going with their regeneration programme". Omar Berrada, the chief executive of Manchester United, said that "the stadium in isolation doesn't make sense without the wider regeneration project". The Chancellor of the Exchequer, Rachel Reeves, said in January 2025 that she supported the regeneration of the area around Old Trafford.

In March 2025, it was announced that the club would build a proposed 100,000-seater arena, costing around £2 billion ($2.6 billion) designed by British architect Norman Foster. The club claims they are consulting with fans on key aspects of the build.

In June 2026, the club secured most of the land needed to build the new stadium from Indurent (part of investment firm Blackstone) for an undisclosed price. The wider 370-acre regeneration project, to a masterplan created by Allies and Morrison, was expected to create around 15,000 new homes, including affordable housing, plus commercial, cultural and transport uses and green space.

The new stadium is under consideration as a host venue for the 2035 FIFA Women's World Cup.

== Design ==
The new stadium will be one of the tallest structures in Greater Manchester and the second-largest football stadium in Europe after the Nou Camp in Barcelona. It will have 100,000 seats, but its gross seating capacity will reach 104,000. Hospitality will account for 15.5% of the seats. It will feature a 'trident' of three masts; the central mast will be 200 metres (660 ft) tall and feature a viewing platform. The designs for the stadium feature a vast 126,000-square-metre (1,360,000 sq ft) canopy under which would be a commercial quarter of entertainment and commercial venues. The pitch of the stadium will be 15.9 metres (52 ft) below ground level.

The proposed design by Foster + Partners led to comparisons with the one for the Hassan II Stadium, proposed by Populous and Oualalou + Choi. Both stadiums feature large, tent-like roofs. The perceived resemblance attracted media attention when unveiled in March 2025. However, the two projects also have significant differences in their structure and architectural style.

== Construction ==
Norman Foster of Foster + Partners has estimated that the construction will take five years. It is planned to build the stadium with a modular construction, transporting materials along the Manchester Ship Canal.
