= Jean-Claude Blanc =

French sports executive

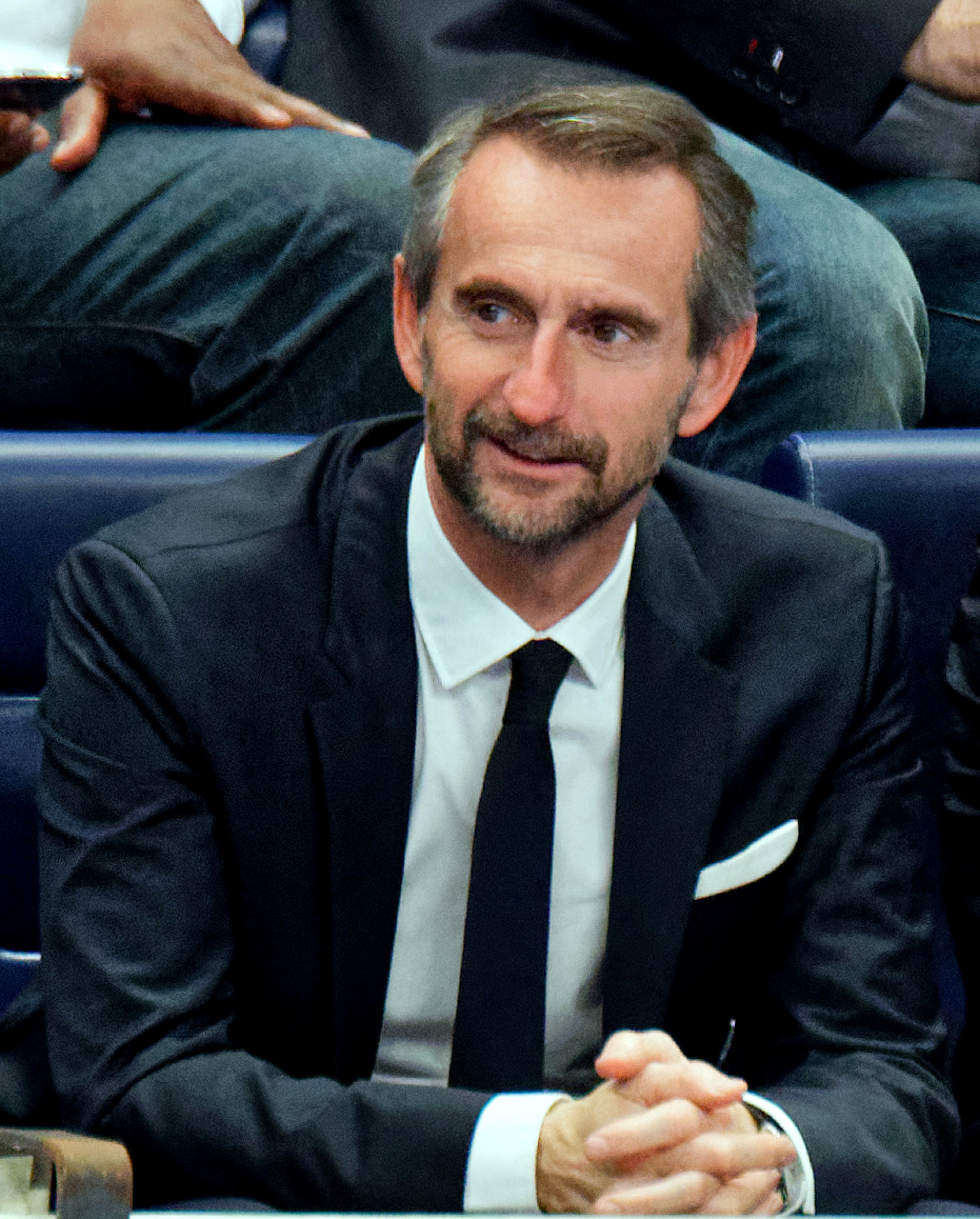
Blanc in 2015

Jean-Claude Blanc (French pronunciation: [ʒɑ̃klod blɑ̃]; born 9 April 1963) is a French sports executive and former marketing director of Paris Saint-Germain and former CEO of Juventus.

Blanc is currently the CEO of Ineos Sport. He joined the Manchester United board in December 2023 following INEOS Sport's acquisition of a 25% stake in the club, initially serving as interim director. He later took on a strategic position as head of international football relations and special advisor to the board of directors. He also serves on the European Club Association (ECA) and UEFA's Club Competition (UCC) Board of Administration.

== Education ==
Blanc holds an International Business and Marketing degree from Skema Business School and an MBA from Harvard Business School.

== Career ==
Blanc is an experienced sports marketing executive. He managed the Olympics, the (Winter Games), the Tour de France, the Paris Dakar, the French Open, the Davis Cup and has been the chairman and CEO of Juventus.

Between 1987 and 1992, Blanc was sales and marketing/opening and closing ceremony director for the Albertville Olympic Games in France, and worked very close to Jean-Claude Killy, chairman of the Organizing Committee. After earning his MBA at Harvard, Blanc then became the CEO between 1994 and 2000 of Amauy Sport Organization (ASO), a branch of a media company owning and operating the main sporting events in France in cycling, motor racing, and athletics (Tour de France, Paris/Roubaix, the Paris Dakar race, Paris Marathon, etc.) Blanc boosted ASO's revenues and international reach as well as created an all news TV network, L'Equipe TV.

Between 2001 and June 2006, Blanc was CEO of the French Tennis Association and, as such, was the manager in charge of organizing the French Open (Roland-Garros), the Paris Master Series and the Davis Cup/Fed Cup tennis events when staged in France. During his tenure, the French Open added an extra weekend of Grand Slam tennis by starting the tournament on a Sunday instead of a Monday.

Before becoming chairman of the board of Juventus in October 2009, Blanc was brought in as a board member during the club's worst period in history, when it was relegated to Serie B, due to the Calciopoli scandal.

Blanc also worked on the new Juventus arena. This arena, along with a 35,000 square meters mall, is the first to be built in Italy since 1990, and is the only one privately owned by an Italian football club. Blanc has stated many times that the stadium is the future for Juventus, a major revenue-booster and the new soul of the team.

On 19 May 2010 Blanc left his role as chairman of the board of Juventus to Andrea Agnelli, son of former Chairman Umberto Agnelli. Blanc retained his role as general manager and CEO. Agnelli's response to Blanc's confirmed responsibilities was, "He will take care of the operations management of the club at 360 degrees and focus mainly on the development of revenues, managed our international relations with UEFA and FIFA as well as follow up on the stadium project strategic for the future of the club."

On 11 May 2011, in line with his working contract and in agreement with the owners of the club, Blanc released his executive powers to the Board of Juventus, and resigned as CEO. Instead, he became a member of the Board of Directors. However, Blanc tendered his resignation and left the Board of Directors post on 15 October 2011.

On 7 October 2011, Qatar Sports Investments (QSI), the owner of Paris Saint-Germain (PSG), announced that Jean-Claude Blanc was appointed as the club's deputy chief executive officer.

Considered one of the leading figures in sports management in France, he had authority over all non-sporting matters: stadium management, external relations, sponsorship, merchandise, and finances. He increased the club's budget fivefold in 4 years. He effectively served as a co-President, initiating major projects, such as the renovation of the Parc des Princes and the construction of the new training centre.

On 26 December 2022, Paris Saint-Germain announced in a statement that Jean-Claude Blanc would leave his position at the club.

On 27 December 2022, Blanc was announced as CEO of Ineos Sport, tasked with overseeing all of INEOS sports portfolio including football, Formula 1, cycling, sailing, rugby and running.

Shortly after his appointment, INEOS publicly announced its entry into the formal process of purchasing shares in Manchester United, the club that INEOS owner, Jim Ratcliffe, has supported since childhood.

On 24 December 2023, Manchester United announced that INEOS Sport had acquired a quarter of the club's shares, in order to gain control of sporting operations. Jean-Claude Blanc was then appointed interim director of Manchester United. He subsequently maintained a strategic role with the club, as head of international football relations and special advisor to the board of directors. On 31 March 2025, Blanc's role as a director of Manchester United PLC was terminated, according to filings at Companies House, although the club has not issued a public statement on the matter.

In April 2024, Blanc was appointed interim CEO of Manchester United, serving until the arrival of Omar Berrada as permanent CEO in July 2024.

After July 2024, he transitioned from a directorial role to a more strategic position, becoming chief of International Football Relations and special adviser to the Manchester United board.

According to official filings, Blanc’s tenure as a director of Manchester United plc formally ended on 31 March 2025, although the club did not make a public announcement regarding the change.

In July 2025, OGC Nice confirmed a governance update in which new president/CEO Fabrice Bocquet assumed full executive responsibility, while Blanc remained involved in a coordinating capacity alongside INEOS.
