= Collette Roche =

British sports administrator

- Education: BBA Management with German, Lancaster University
- Occupations: Chief Executive Officer, New Stadium Development
- Employer: Manchester United

Collette Roche is the Chief Executive Officer, New Stadium Development, at Manchester United. She held a number of senior HR positions at large companies before becoming one of the small number of women who hold boardroom roles with Premier League football teams. In 2018, she was listed by Vogue as one of the 25 "most influential women working in Britain".

== Career ==
Roche grew up in Lancashire, and attended Lancaster University, graduating from BBA Management with German in 1997. After her studies, she took up a role in employee relations at Ford Motor Company in Dagenham, as part of the company's HR graduate scheme. In 1999, she moved to Siemens, where she was a HR executive, then in 2002 she became a HR Manager for commercial and international business at United Utilities. After seven years at United Utilities, Roche joined Manchester Airports Group, holding positions as chief of staff and acting managing director.

In spring 2018, Roche was appointed Chief Operating Officer at Manchester United. and in 2023 was also appointed Chair of the Manchester United Foundation. During her career Roche has also held several non-executive board roles including Northern Powerhouse, Manchester Metropolitan University, JW Lees Brewery and was a founding member of the new UK Board of Trade in 2016.

In March 2025, Roche was reported as a leading candidate for the chief executive officer position at Newcastle United, highlighting her growing profile within English football management.

In January 2026, Roche was appointed as Chief Executive Officer, New Stadium Development, at Manchester United. This is a new role in the club, with a focus on the regeneration of Old Trafford. She continues to report to Chief Executive Officer Omar Berrada.

== Recognition ==
- 2015: Ranked at 31 in Northwest Business Insider Women 100 list.
- 2017: Listed as one of "100 inspirational women from Greater Manchester" by the Manchester Evening News.
- 2018: Listed as one of the 25 "most influential women working in Britain" in Vogue.
