= 2035 FIFA Women's World Cup =

Upcoming edition of the FIFA Women's World Cup

Tournament details
- Host country: England; Northern Ireland; Scotland; Wales
- Dates: 2035
- Teams: 48 (from 6 confederations)

The 2035 FIFA Women's World Cup is scheduled to be the 12th edition of the FIFA Women's World Cup, the quadrennial international women's football championship contested by the national teams that represent the member associations of FIFA. The tournament will be hosted by England, Northern Ireland, Scotland and Wales, as they are the sole bidders. This will be the second tournament to feature 48 national teams.

The tournament will be the first time England, Northern Ireland, Scotland, and Wales host the FIFA Women's World Cup, as well as the fourth FIFA Women's World Cup in Europe after Sweden in 1995, Germany in 2011, and France in 2019. England will also become the eighth country to host both the men's and women's World Cup, having hosted the former in 1966. It is also the first FIFA tournament to be held in Northern Ireland and Wales, and the second to be held in Scotland. (Note: Scotland held the 1989 FIFA U-16 World Championship.)

== Host selection ==
The host nation for the 2031 Women's World Cup is scheduled to be officially decided by the tenth extraordinary FIFA Congress on 23 November 2026 in Zurich, two years after the host selection for the 2027 edition. On 5 March 2025 the FIFA Council approved the bid regulations which restricted bids to UEFA and CAF members. The key dates include:

- 31 March 2025: Member associations to submit their expressions of interest to host the 2031 and 2035 Women's World Cup
- 30 April 2025: Member associations to confirm their interest in bidding to host the Women's World Cup by submitting the bidding agreement
- Q2 2025: Bid workshop and observer programme to take place
- 28 November 2025: Member associations to submit their bids to FIFA
- February 2026: FIFA to organise on-site inspection visits to bidding countries
- 11 November 2026: Publication of FIFA's bid evaluation report
- 23 November 2026: Appointment of the 2031 and 2035 Women's World Cup host(s) by the tenth extraordinary FIFA Congress in Zurich, Switzerland.

Although the host nation has not been confirmed, the submitted sole bid was unveiled. On 3 April 2025, FIFA announced that the United Kingdom home nations bid was the only valid bid. Due to UEFA's boycott of FIFA competitions due to the FIFA Forward Enterprise proposal, it is unknown if an alternative host, which would have to be from CAF, will be selected if the boycott is maintained by 23 November 2026.

== Format ==
The 2035 FIFA Women's World Cup will be contested by 48 teams as part of an expansion starting with the 2031 edition.

== Venues ==
In its hosting requirements document, FIFA stipulated that the 32-team competition will have a minimum of eight stadiums—of which at least five were existing venues. The stadiums would have minimum seating capacities of 20,000 for most matches, 40,000 for semifinal matches, and 65,000 for the opening match and final. However, additional changes will be made to accommodate the expansion to 48. Manchester United have expressed interest in hosting this final in their yet-to-be built 100,000 seater stadium, though reports have indicated the FA prefers Wembley Stadium. Other interested cities currently include Belfast, Birmingham, Brighton and Hove, Bristol, Cardiff, Edinburgh, Glasgow, Leeds, Liverpool, London, Newcastle upon Tyne, Nottingham, Sunderland, and Wrexham.

No venue in Northern Ireland currently meets the minimum capacity requirement, with the largest existing stadium, Windsor Park, having only 18,500 capacity. Plans for the redevelopment of Casement Park into a 34,500 capacity venue for the UEFA Euro 2028 were stalled and resulted in Northern Ireland withdrawing from hosting the tournament.

On 28 November 2025, the formal bid submission proposed 22 venues in 16 cities, including some planned and provisional stadiums. It's not known yet how many venues will be used for the tournament. The bid submission also highlights that 63 million people live within two hours of any proposed venue.

Shortlisted locations

List of host cities and stadiums
Country	City	Stadium	Capacity	Image
England	London	Wembley Stadium	90,000	
England	London	Tottenham Hotspur Stadium	62,850	
England	London	Emirates Stadium	60,704	
England	London	Stamford Bridge (Note: Provisional, the stadium does not meet FIFA’s technical requirements, and will either be renovated or moved to a newly built stadium.)	40,022	
England	London	Selhurst Park	25,486 (to be renovated)	
England	Manchester	Old Trafford (Note: Provisional, may switch to New Trafford Stadium.)	74,197	
England	Manchester	Etihad Stadium	61,470	
England	Birmingham	New Birmingham City Stadium	62,000	
England	Birmingham	Villa Park	50,000 (after renovation)	
England	Leeds	Elland Road	53,000 (after renovation)	
England	Liverpool	Hill Dickinson Stadium	52,769	
England	Newcastle	St James' Park	52,305	
England	Sunderland	Stadium of Light	49,000	
England	Brighton & Hove	Falmer Stadium	31,876	
England	Nottingham	City Ground	30,404 (to be renovated)	
England	Bristol	Ashton Gate	26,462	
Northern Ireland	Belfast	Windsor Park	18,500 (to be renovated)	
Scotland	Glasgow	Hampden Park	51,866	
Scotland	Edinburgh	Easter Road	20,421	
Wales	Cardiff	Millennium Stadium	73,931	
Wales	Cardiff	Cardiff City Stadium	33,280	
Wales	Wrexham	Racecourse Ground	15,500 (to be renovated)	

== Teams ==
=== Qualification ===
FIFA's confederations organise their own qualifying competitions, with the exception of CAF and CONCACAF which qualify teams through continental championships. The hosts England, Scotland, Wales and Northern Ireland receive automatic qualification for the tournament, leaving most of the remaining FIFA member associations eligible to enter qualification if they chose to do so. Wales and Northern Ireland will participate for the first time ever, but may still qualify for 2027 or 2031.

The allocation of slots below was announced by the FIFA Council in April 2025. The slot for the host nation will be taken directly from the quotas allocated to their confederation.

- AFC (Asia): TBD
- CAF (Africa): TBD
- CONCACAF (North America, Central America and the Caribbean): TBD
- CONMEBOL (South America): TBD
- OFC (Oceania): TBD
- UEFA (Europe): TBD (including co-hosts England, Northern Ireland, Scotland, and Wales)
- Inter-confederation play-off tournament: TBD

=== Qualified teams ===
Team	Qualified as	Qualification date	Appearance in finals	Last appearance	Consecutive streak	Previous best performance
England	Co-hosts	3 April 2025 (Note: On 3 April 2025, FIFA announced that the England–Northern Ireland–Scotland–Wales bid was the only valid bid, however, the hosts will be officially appointed on 23 November 2026.)	7th/8th/9th	2023/2027/2031	1/2/8	Runners-up (2023)
Northern Ireland	Co-hosts	3 April 2025	1st/2nd/3rd	None/2027/2031	1/2/3	Debut
Scotland	Co-hosts	3 April 2025	2nd/3rd/4th	2019/2027/2031	1/2/3	Group stage (2019)
Wales	Co-hosts	3 April 2025	1st/2nd/3rd	None/2027/2031	1/2/3	Debut

== UEFA boycott ==
On 30 July 2026, following FIFA's announcement of FIFA Forward Enterprise (a proposal to sell stakes in FIFA's tournament operations, including for the FIFA Women's World Cup, to private investors), all 55 UEFA member associations agreed on an indefinite boycott of FIFA competitions until the proposal was shelved and assurances were made that such a proposal would not be tabulated again. All four host nations in the 2035 FIFA Women's World Cup bid are part of the boycott. A day later on 31 July, the proposal was scrapped, although UEFA stated that, regardless, it no longer trusts FIFA's governance. UEFA provisionally suspended its boycott on August 26 following written assurances that a similar proposal would not be brought up in the future, though the UEFA Executive Committee will monitor events and reinstate the boycott if deemed necessary.
