= Christopher Vivell =

German football executive (born 1986)

Personal information
- Date of birth: 15 December 1986 (age 39)
- Place of birth: Karlsruhe, Germany
- Position: Forward

Youth career
- –2005: Karlsruher SC

Senior career*
Years	Team	Apps	(Gls)
2005–2010	ASV Durlach	91	(13)
2011	SV Spielberg		
2011–2013	FV Graben		
2013–2015	FV Ettlingenweier II		

Managerial career
- 2010–2015: TSG Hoffenheim (scout)
- 2015–2020: Red Bull Salzburg (scout)
- 2020–2022: RB Leipzig (technical director)
- 2022–2023: Chelsea (technical director)
- 2024–: Manchester United (director of recruitment)
- * Club domestic league appearances and goals

Christopher Vivell (born 15 December 1986) is a German professional football executive and former player who is currently the director of recruitment at Manchester United.

== Early life ==
Vivell was born on 15 December 1986 in Karlsruhe, Germany and is a native of the city. Growing up, he attended the Karlsruhe Institute of Technology in Germany.His brother is Markus Vivell, who works in a school.

== Playing career ==
As a youth player, Vivell joined the youth academy of German side Karlsruher SC. Following his stint there, he signed for German side ASV Durlach in 2005, where he made ninety-three league appearances and scored thirteen goals.

Afterwards, he signed for German side SV Spielberg in 2011. The same year, he signed for German side FV Graben. During the summer of 2013, he signed for German side FV Ettlingenweier II. At the age of twenty-eight, he retired from playing football.

== Recruitment career ==
In 2010, Vivell was appointed as a scout of German side TSG Hoffenheim. Five years later, he was appointed as a scout of Austrian side Red Bull Salzburg, where he helped the club sign Norway international Erling Haaland, Zambia international Patson Daka and Germany international Karim Adeyemi.

Subsequently, he served as technical director of German Bundesliga side RB Leipzig in 2020, and in 2022 was appointed technical director of English Premier League club Chelsea. Ahead of the 2024–25 season, he joined Manchester United as interim director of recruitment on a short-term deal, with the possibility of a permanent appointment. In February 2025, he was appointed to the position on a full-time basis, signing a multi-year contract.
