= Manchester United F.C. =

Association football club in England

Manchester United
- Full name: Manchester United Football Club
- Nickname: The Red Devils United
- Short name: Man United; Man Utd; MUFC
- Founded: 5 March 1878; 148 years ago (as Newton Heath LYR F.C.); 24 April 1902; 124 years ago (as Manchester United F.C.)
- Ground: Old Trafford
- Capacity: 74,158
- Owner(s): Manchester United plc (71.06%); Ineos (28.94%)
- Executive co-chairmen: Joel Glazer; Avram Glazer
- Head coach: Mauricio Pochettino
- League: Premier League
- 2025–26: Premier League, 3rd of 20
- Website: manutd.com
Home colours	Away colours	Third colours

Manchester United Football Club, commonly referred to as Man United (often stylised as Man Utd) or simply United, is a professional football club based in Old Trafford, Greater Manchester, England. They compete in the Premier League, the top tier of English football. Manchester United are among the most successful football clubs in England, as well as one of the most successful football clubs in the world. Domestically, they have won a joint-record twenty top-flight league titles, thirteen FA Cups, six League Cups and a record twenty-one FA Community Shields. Additionally, in international football, they have won the European Cup/UEFA Champions League three times, and the UEFA Europa League, the UEFA Cup Winners' Cup, the UEFA Super Cup, the Intercontinental Cup and the FIFA Club World Cup once each.

Nicknamed the Red Devils, they were founded as Newton Heath LYR Football Club in 1878, but changed their name to Manchester United in 1902. After a spell playing in Clayton, Manchester, the club moved to their current stadium, Old Trafford, in 1910. Appointed as manager in 1945, Matt Busby built a team with an average age of just 22 – nicknamed the Busby Babes – that won successive league titles in the 1950s, and became the first English club to compete in the European Cup. Eight players were killed in the Munich air disaster, but Busby rebuilt the team around star players George Best, Denis Law and Bobby Charlton (known as the United Trinity). They won two more league titles before becoming the first English club to win the European Cup in 1968.

After Busby's retirement, Manchester United were unable to produce sustained success until the arrival of Alex Ferguson, who became the club's longest-serving and most successful manager, winning 38 trophies including 13 league titles, five FA Cups and two Champions League titles between 1986 and 2013. In the 1998–99 season, under Ferguson, the club became the first in the history of English football to achieve the continental treble of the Premier League, FA Cup and UEFA Champions League. In winning the UEFA Europa League under José Mourinho in 2016–17, they became one of five clubs to have won the original three main UEFA club competitions (the Champions League, Europa League and Cup Winners' Cup).

Manchester United is one of the most widely supported football clubs in the world and have rivalries with Liverpool, Manchester City, Leeds United and Arsenal. Manchester United was the highest-earning football club in the world for 2016–17, with an annual revenue of €676.3 million, and the world's second-most-valuable football club in 2024, valued at £6.55 billion ($5.22 billion). After being floated on the London Stock Exchange in 1991, the club was taken private in 2005 after a purchase by American businessman Malcolm Glazer valued at almost £800 million, of which over £500 million of borrowed money became the club's debt. From 2012, some shares of the club were listed on the New York Stock Exchange, although the Glazer family retains overall ownership and control of the club.

== History ==
A chart showing the progress of Manchester United through the English football league system, from joining as Newton Heath in 1892–93 to the present

=== Early years (1878–1945) ===
Manchester United were formed in 1878 as Newton Heath LYR Football Club by the Carriage and Wagon department of the Lancashire and Yorkshire Railway (LYR) depot at Newton Heath. The team initially played games against other departments and railway companies, but on 20 November 1880, they competed in their first recorded match; wearing the colours of the railway company - green and gold - they were defeated 6–0 by Bolton Wanderers' reserve team. By 1888, the club had become a founding member of The Combination, a regional football league. Following the league's dissolution after only one season, Newton Heath joined the newly formed Football Alliance, which ran for three seasons before being merged with The Football League. This resulted in the club starting the 1892–93 season in the First Division, by which time it had become independent of the railway company and dropped the "LYR" from its name. After two seasons, the club was relegated to the Second Division.

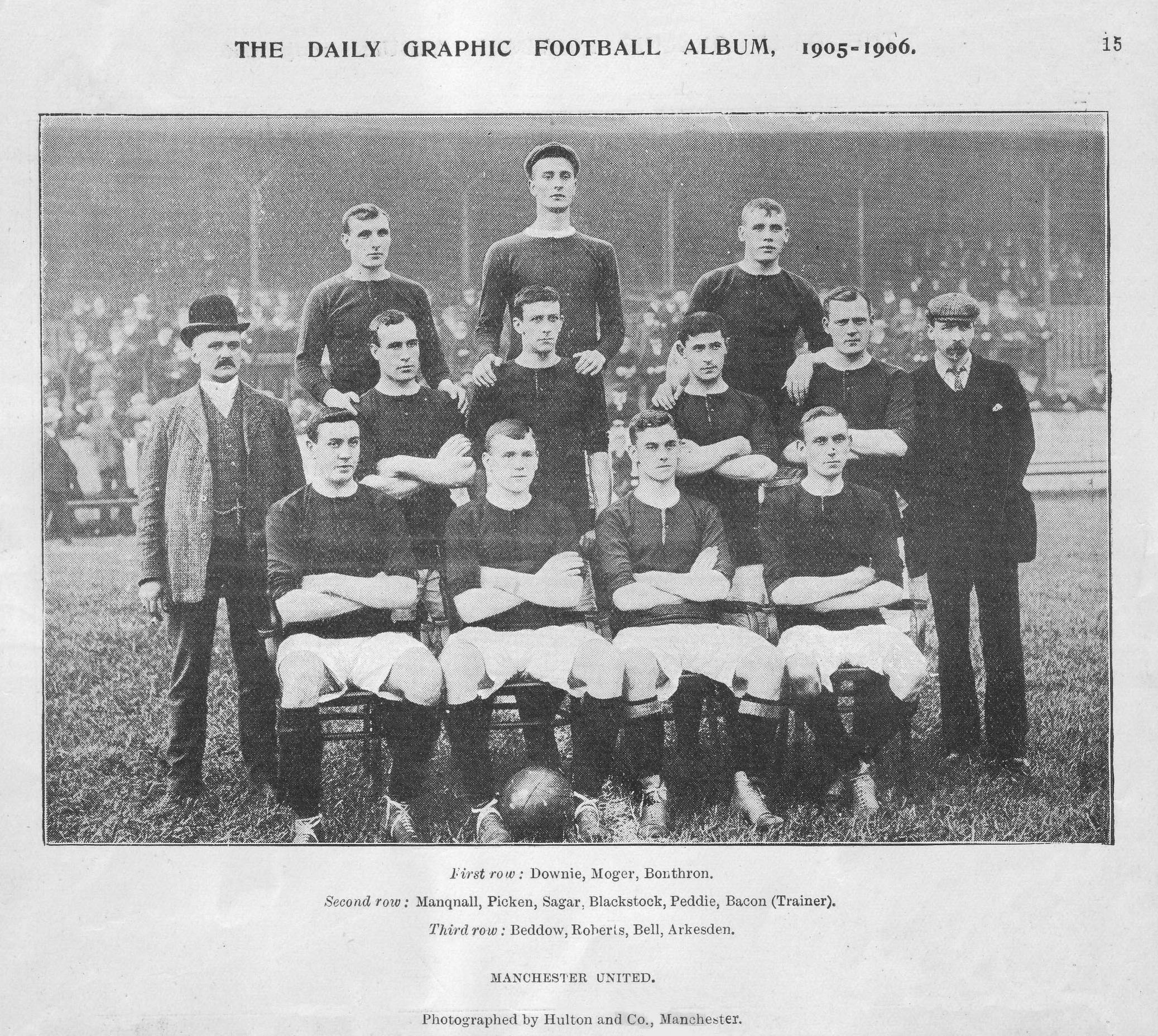
The Manchester United team at the start of the 1905–06 season, in which they were runners-up in the Second Division

In January 1902, with debts of £2,670 – equivalent to £280,000 in 2025 (Note: UK Consumer Price Index inflation figures from 1209–2024 based on data from "Inflation calculator". Bank of England. London. 18 February 2026.) – the club was served with a winding-up order. Captain Harry Stafford found four local businessmen, including John Henry Davies (who became club president), each willing to invest £500 in return for a direct interest in running the club and who subsequently changed the name; on 24 April 1902, Manchester United was officially born. (Note: Sources are divided on the exact date of the meeting and subsequent name change. Whilst official club sources claim that it occurred on 26 April, the meeting was reported by the Manchester Evening Chronicle in its edition of 25 April, suggesting it was indeed on 24 April.) Under Ernest Mangnall, who assumed managerial duties in 1903, Manchester United finished as Second Division runners-up in 1906 and secured promotion to the First Division, which they won in 1908 – the club's first league title. The following season began with victory in the first ever Charity Shield and ended with the club's first FA Cup title. Mangnall was considered a significant influence behind the team's move to Old Trafford in 1910, and Manchester United won the First Division for the second time in 1911. At the end of the following season, however, Mangnall left the club to join Manchester City.

In 1922, three years after the resumption of football following the First World War, the club was relegated to the Second Division, where it remained until regaining promotion in 1925. Relegated again in 1931, Manchester United became a yo-yo club, achieving its all-time lowest position of 20th place in the Second Division in 1934, under secretary-manager Scott Duncan, narrowly avoiding relegation to the Third Division. Two years later, Duncan led the club to promotion before another relegation followed in 1937, which led to his resignation in November of that year. Following the death of principal benefactor John Henry Davies in October 1927, the club's finances deteriorated to the extent that Manchester United would likely have gone bankrupt had it not been for James W. Gibson, who, in December 1931, invested £2,000 and assumed control of the club. In the 1938–39 season, the last year of football before the Second World War, the club finished 14th in the First Division.

=== Busby years (1945–1969) ===
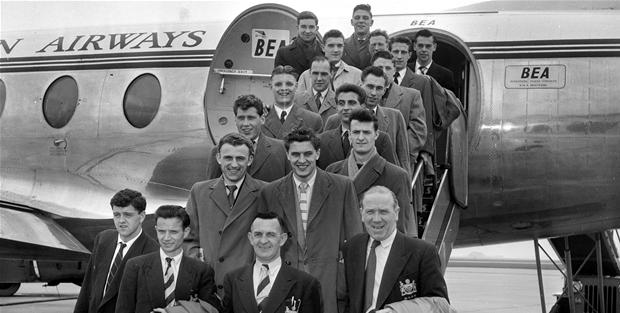
The Busby Babes in 1955. Manager Matt Busby is pictured front right.

In October 1945, the impending resumption of football after the war led to the managerial appointment of Matt Busby, who demanded an unprecedented level of control over team selection, player transfers. and training sessions. Busby led the team to second-place league finishes in 1947, 1948, and 1949, and to FA Cup victory in 1948. In 1952, the club won the First Division, its first league title for 41 years. They then won back-to-back league titles in 1956 and 1957; the squad, which had an average age of 22, was nicknamed "the Busby Babes" by the media, a testament to Busby's faith in his youth players. In 1957, Manchester United became the first English team to compete in the European Cup, despite objections from The Football League, who had denied Chelsea the same opportunity the previous season. En route to the semi-final, which they lost to Real Madrid, the team recorded a 10–0 victory over Belgian champions Anderlecht, which remains the club's biggest victory on record.

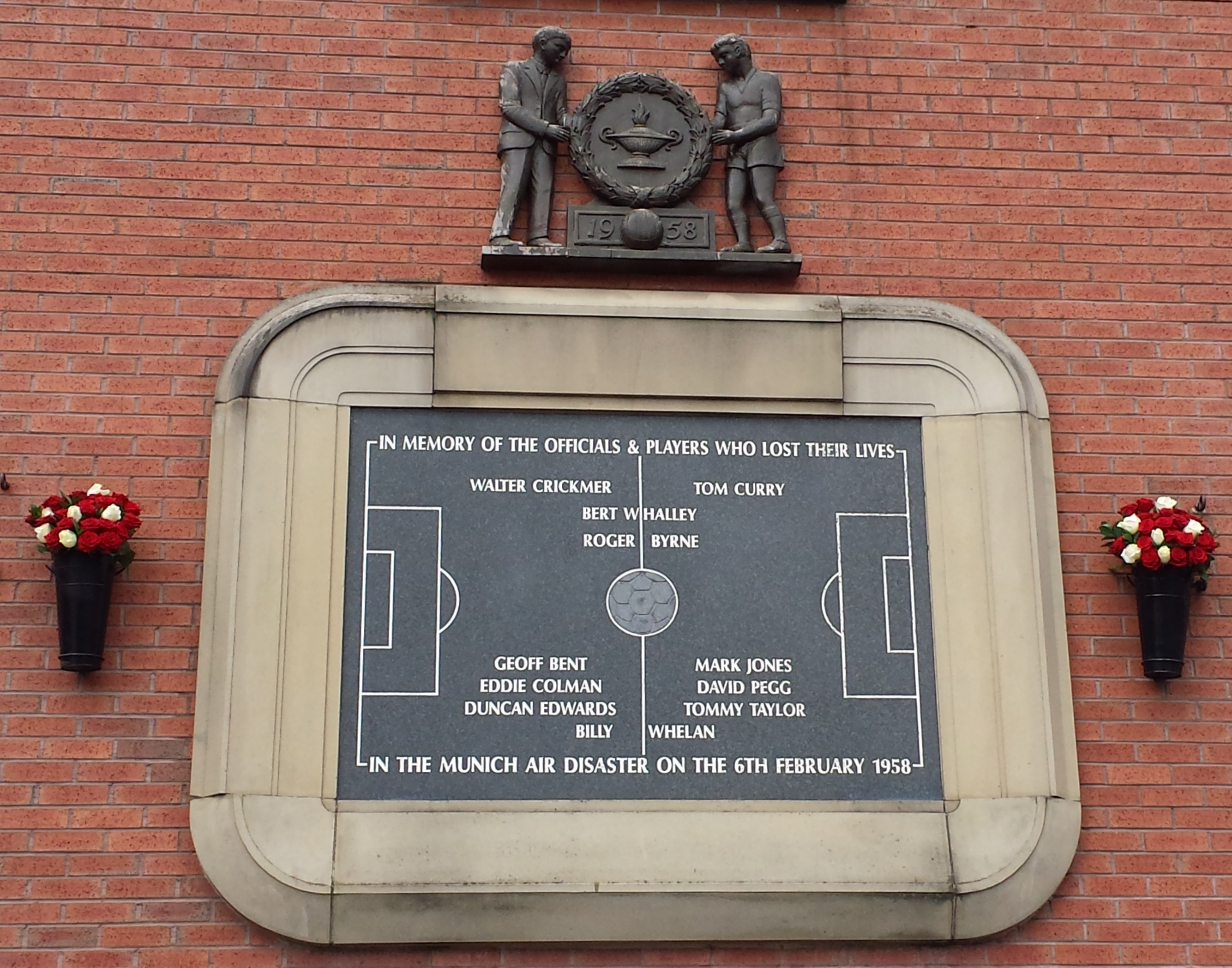
A plaque at Old Trafford in memory of those who died in the Munich air disaster, including players' names

The following season, on the way home from a European Cup quarter-final victory against Red Star Belgrade, the aircraft carrying the Manchester United players, officials, and journalists crashed while attempting to take off after refuelling in Munich, Germany. The Munich air disaster of 6 February 1958 claimed 23 lives, including those of eight players – Geoff Bent, Roger Byrne, Eddie Colman, Duncan Edwards, Mark Jones, David Pegg, Tommy Taylor and Billy Whelan – and injured several more.

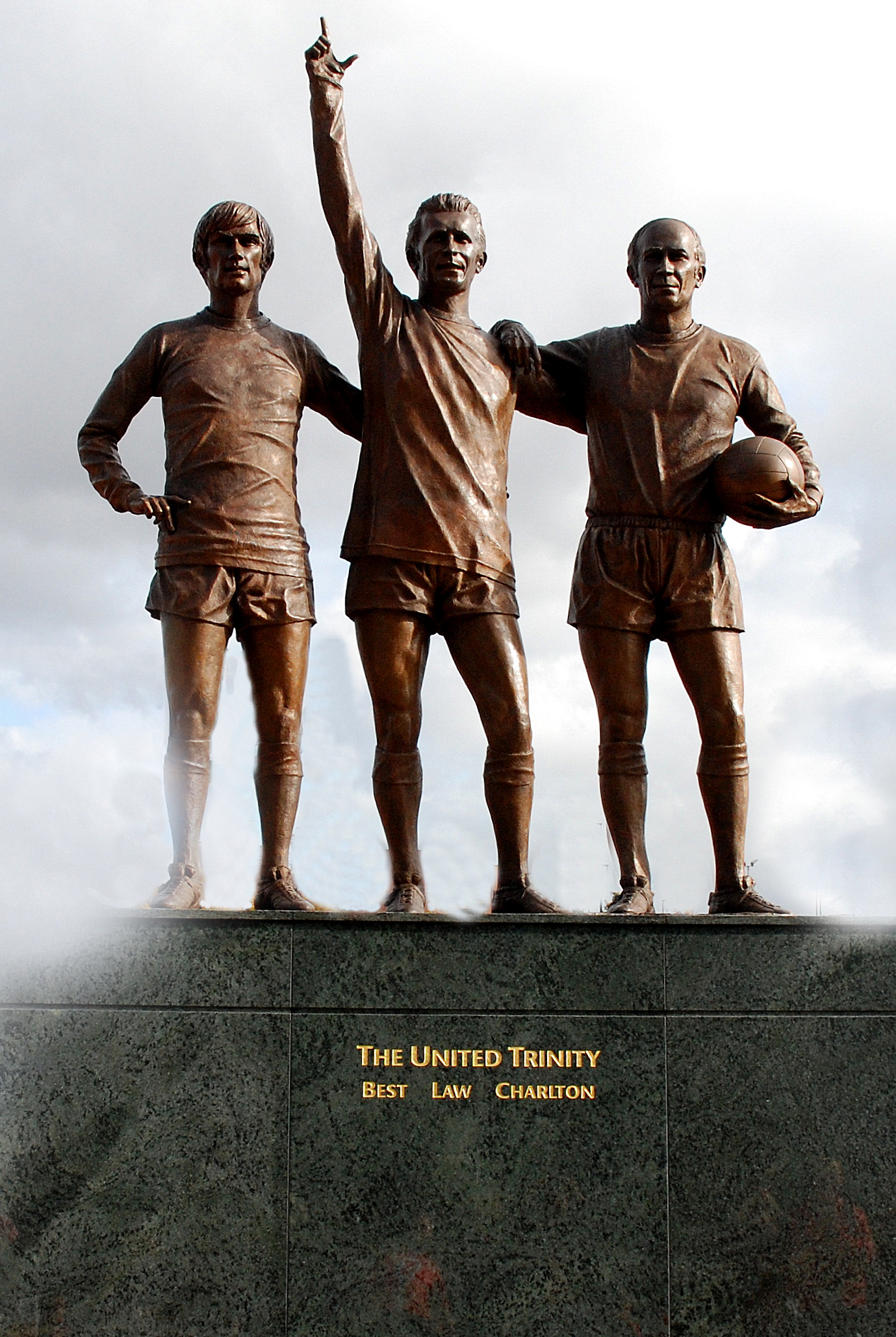
The United Trinity statue of George Best (left), Denis Law (centre) and Bobby Charlton (right) outside Old Trafford

Assistant manager Jimmy Murphy took over as manager while Busby recovered from his injuries and the club's makeshift side reached the FA Cup final, which they lost to Bolton Wanderers. In recognition of the team's tragedy, UEFA invited the club to compete in the 1958–59 European Cup alongside eventual League champions Wolverhampton Wanderers. Despite approval from The Football Association, The Football League determined that the club should not enter the competition, since it had not qualified. Busby rebuilt the team through the 1960s by signing players such as Denis Law and Paddy Crerand, who combined with the next generation of youth players – including George Best – to win the FA Cup in 1963. Busby rested several key players for the League game before the Cup Final, which gave Dennis Walker the chance to make his debut against Nottingham Forest on 20 May. Walker thus became the first Black player to represent United. The following season, they finished second in the league, then won the title in 1965 and 1967. In 1968, Manchester United became the first English club to win the European Cup, beating Benfica 4–1 in the final with a team that contained three European Footballers of the Year: Bobby Charlton, Denis Law and George Best. They then represented Europe in the 1968 Intercontinental Cup against Estudiantes of Argentina, but defeat in the first leg in Buenos Aires meant a 1–1 draw at Old Trafford three weeks later was not enough to claim the title. Busby resigned as manager in 1969 before being replaced by the reserve team coach, former Manchester United player Wilf McGuinness.

=== Post-Busby decline (1969–1986) ===
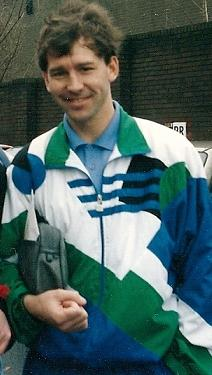
Bryan Robson was the captain of Manchester United for 12 years, longer than any other player.

Following an eighth-place finish in the 1969–70 season and a poor start to the 1970–71 season, Busby was persuaded to temporarily resume managerial duties, and McGuinness returned to his position as reserve team coach. In June 1971, Frank O'Farrell was appointed as manager, but lasted less than 18 months before being replaced by Tommy Docherty in December 1972. Docherty saved Manchester United from relegation that season, only to see them relegated in 1974; by that time, the trio of Best, Law, and Charlton had left the club. The team won promotion at the first attempt and reached the FA Cup final in 1976, but were beaten by Southampton. They reached the final again in 1977, beating Liverpool 2–1. Docherty was dismissed shortly afterwards, following the revelation of his affair with the club physiotherapist's wife.

Dave Sexton replaced Docherty as manager in the summer of 1977. Despite major signings, including Joe Jordan, Gordon McQueen, Gary Bailey, and Ray Wilkins, the team failed to win any trophies; they finished second in 1979–80 and lost to Arsenal in the 1979 FA Cup final. Sexton was dismissed in 1981, even though the team won the last seven games under his direction. He was replaced by Ron Atkinson, who immediately broke the British record transfer fee to sign Bryan Robson from his former club West Bromwich Albion. Under Atkinson, Manchester United won the FA Cup in 1983 and 1985 and beat rivals Liverpool to win the 1983 Charity Shield. In 1985–86, after 13 wins and two draws in its first 15 matches, the club was favourite to win the league but finished in fourth place. The following season, with the club in danger of relegation by November, Atkinson was dismissed.

=== Ferguson years (1986–2013) ===
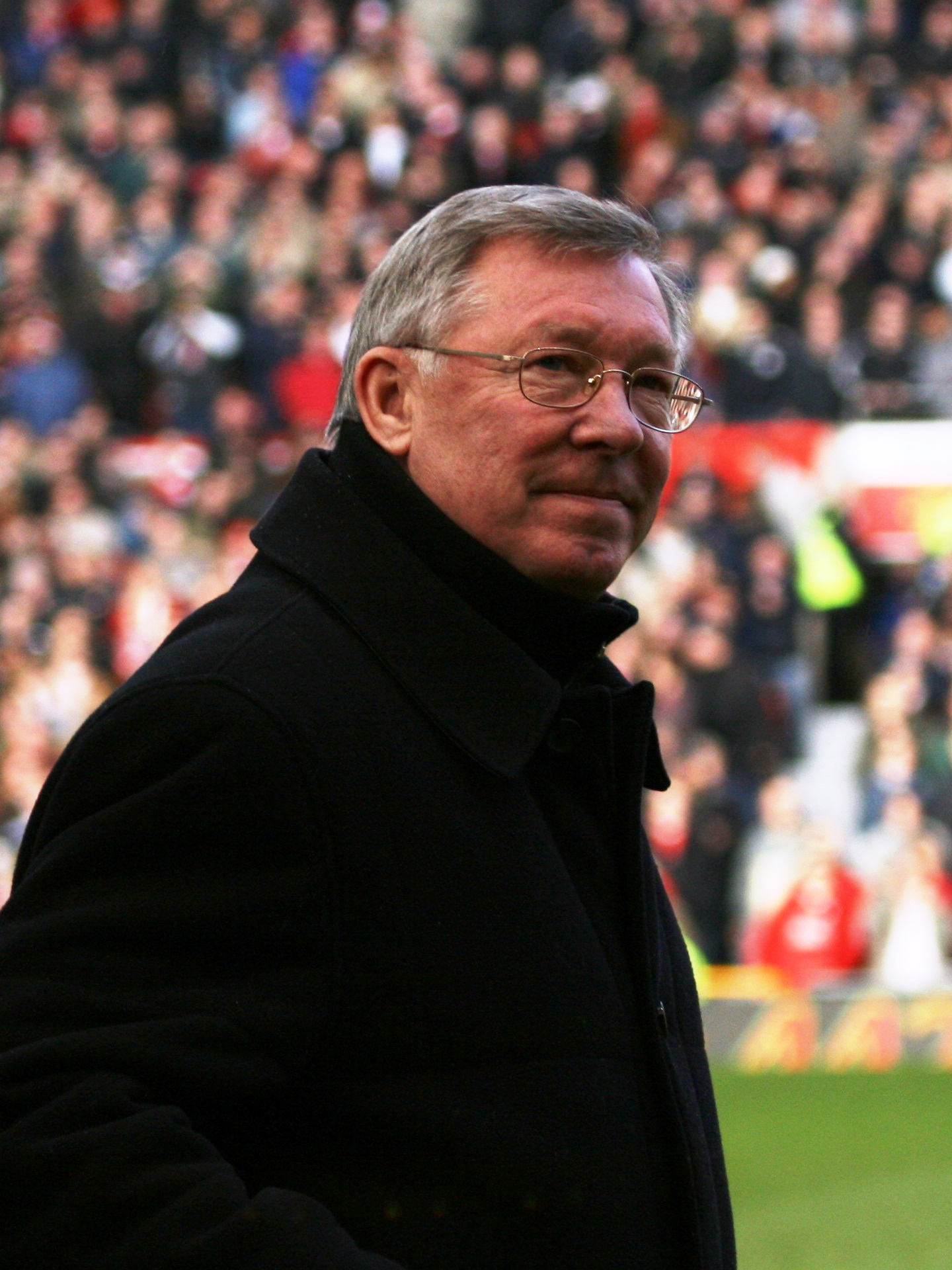
Alex Ferguson managed the team between 1986 and 2013.

Alex Ferguson and his assistant Archie Knox arrived from Aberdeen on 6 November 1986, and guided the club to an 11th-place finish in the league. Despite a second-place finish in 1987–88, the club was back in 11th place the following season. Reportedly on the verge of being dismissed, Ferguson's job was saved by victory over Crystal Palace in the 1990 FA Cup final. The following season, Manchester United claimed their first UEFA Cup Winners' Cup title. That triumph allowed the club to compete in the European Super Cup for the first time, where United beat European Cup holders Red Star Belgrade 1–0 at Old Trafford. The club appeared in two consecutive League Cup finals in 1991 and 1992, beating Nottingham Forest 1–0 in the second to win that competition for the first time as well. In 1993, in the first season of the newly founded Premier League, the club won their first league title since 1967, and a year later, for the first time since 1957, they won a second consecutive title – alongside the FA Cup – to complete the first "Double" in the club's history. United then became the first English club to do the Double twice when they won both competitions again in 1995–96, before retaining the league title once more in 1996–97 with a game to spare.

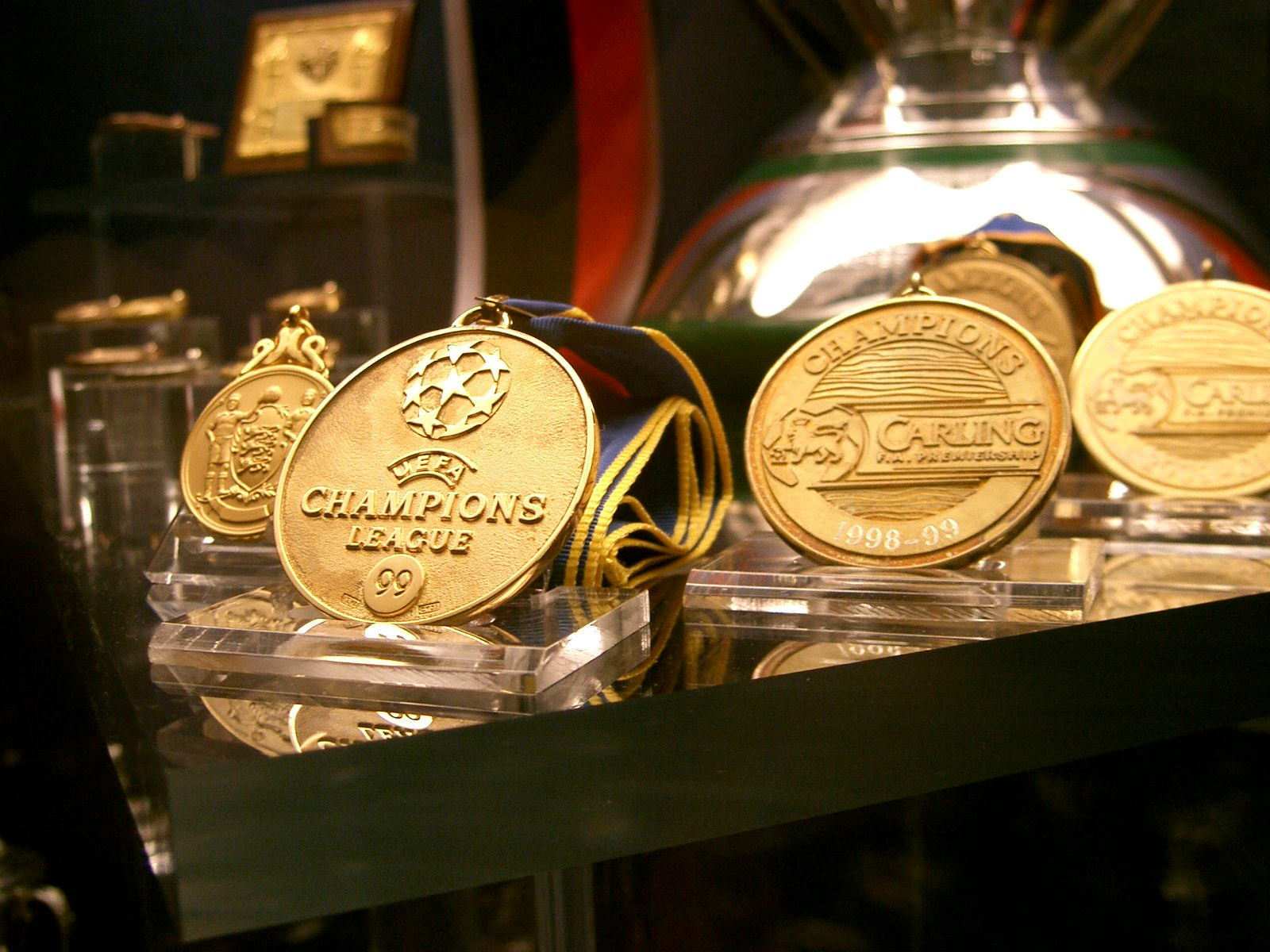
Front three: Manchester United's treble medals of the 1998–99 season are displayed at the club's museum.

In the 1998–99 season, Manchester United became the first team to win the Premier League, FA Cup, and UEFA Champions League – "The Treble" – in the same season. Trailing 1–0 going into injury time in the 1999 UEFA Champions League final, Teddy Sheringham and Ole Gunnar Solskjær scored late goals to claim a dramatic victory over Bayern Munich, in what is considered one of the greatest comebacks of all time. That summer, Ferguson received a knighthood for his services to football. In November 1999, the club became the only British team to ever win the Intercontinental Cup with a 1–0 victory over the Libertadores winners Palmeiras in Tokyo.

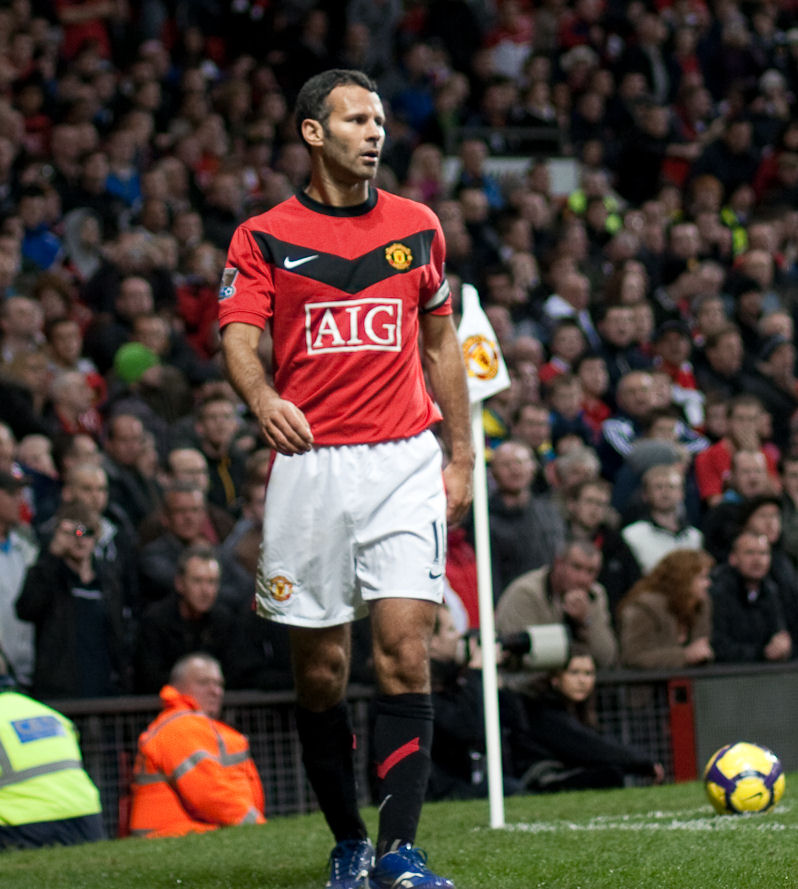
Ryan Giggs is the most decorated player in English football history.

Manchester United won the league again in the 1999–2000 and 2000–01 seasons, becoming only the fourth club to win the English title three times in a row. The team finished third in 2001–02, before regaining the title in 2002–03. They won the 2003–04 FA Cup, beating Millwall 3–0 in the final at the Millennium Stadium in Cardiff to lift the trophy for a record 11th time. In the 2005–06 season, Manchester United failed to qualify for the knockout phase of the UEFA Champions League for the first time in over a decade, but recovered to secure a second-place league finish and victory over Wigan Athletic in the 2006 Football League Cup final. The club regained the Premier League title in the 2006–07 season, before completing the European double in 2007–08 with a 6–5 penalty shoot-out victory over Chelsea in the 2008 UEFA Champions League final in Moscow to go with their 17th English league title. Ryan Giggs made a record 759th appearance for the club in that game, overtaking previous record holder Bobby Charlton. In December 2008, the club became the first British team to win the FIFA Club World Cup after beating LDU Quito 1–0 in the final. Manchester United followed this with the 2008–09 Football League Cup, and its third successive Premier League title. That summer, forward Cristiano Ronaldo was sold to Real Madrid for a world record £80 million. In 2010, Manchester United defeated Aston Villa 2–1 at Wembley to retain the League Cup, its first successful defence of a knockout cup competition.

After finishing as runners-up to Chelsea in the 2009–10 season, United achieved a record 19th league title in 2010–11, securing the championship with a 1–1 away draw against Blackburn Rovers on 14 May 2011. This was extended to 20 league titles in 2012–13, securing the championship with a 3–0 home win against Aston Villa on 22 April 2013.

=== Post-Ferguson decline (2013–present) ===
On 8 May 2013, Ferguson announced that he was to retire as manager at the end of the football season, but would remain at the club as a director and club ambassador. He retired as the most decorated manager in football history. The club announced the next day that Everton manager David Moyes would replace him from 1 July, having signed a six-year contract. Ryan Giggs took over as interim player-manager 10 months later, on 22 April 2014, when Moyes was sacked after a poor season in which the club failed to defend their Premier League title and failed to qualify for the UEFA Champions League for the first time since 1995–96. They also failed to qualify for the UEFA Europa League, the first time Manchester United had not qualified for a European competition since 1990. On 19 May 2014, it was confirmed that Louis van Gaal would replace Moyes as Manchester United manager on a three-year deal, with Giggs as his assistant. Malcolm Glazer, the patriarch of the family that owns the club, died on 28 May 2014.

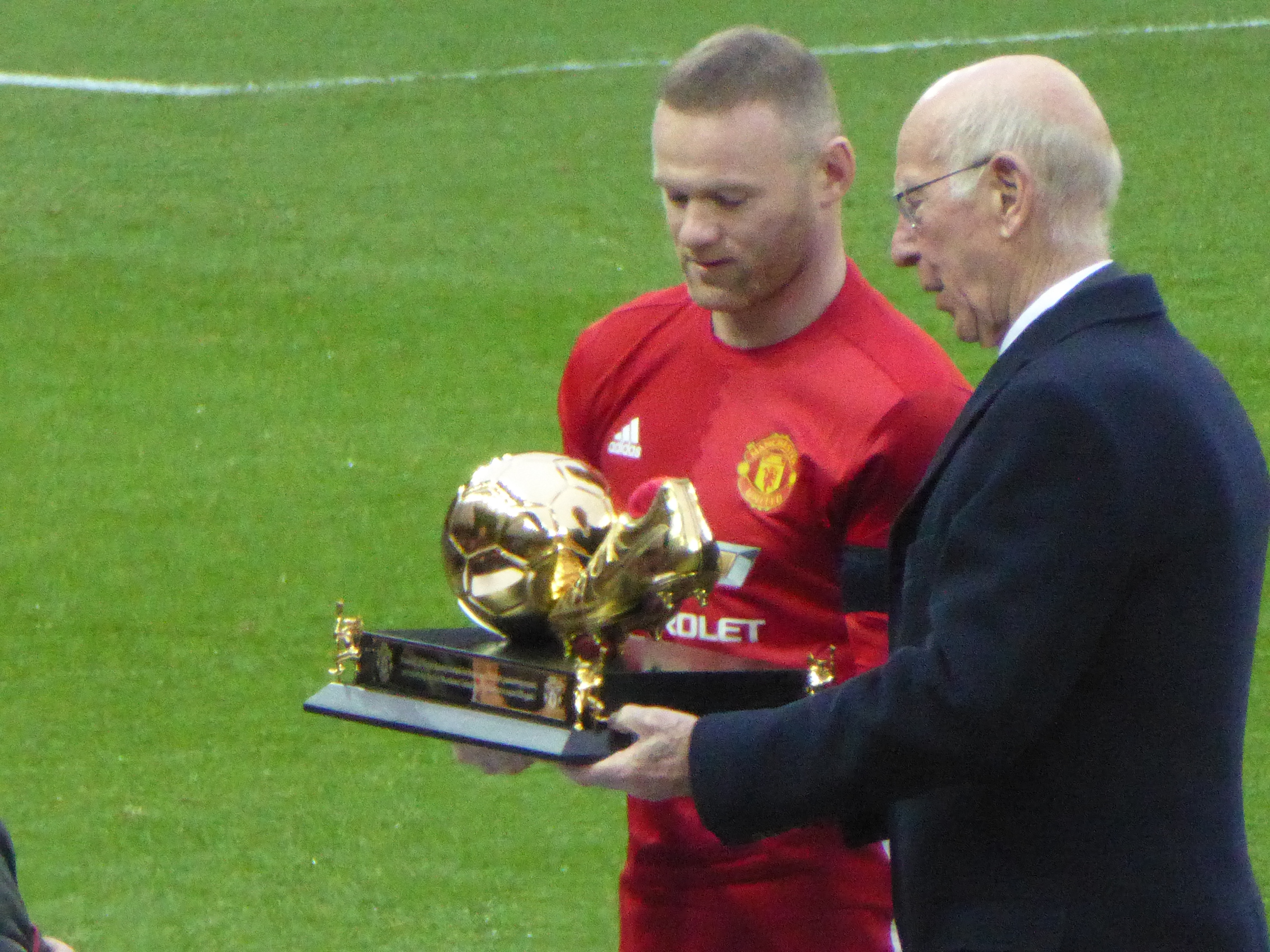
Wayne Rooney receiving an award for becoming the club's record goalscorer from previous record holder Bobby Charlton in January 2017

Under Van Gaal, United won a 12th FA Cup, but a disappointing slump in the middle of his second season led to his sacking with United having finished fifth in the league. José Mourinho was appointed in his place on 27 May 2016. In his first season he won the EFL Cup and the UEFA Europa League. In January 2017, Wayne Rooney scored his 250th goal for United, surpassing Bobby Charlton as the club's all-time top scorer. The following season, United finished second in the league, their highest league placing since 2013, and Mourinho also guided the club to a 19th FA Cup final, but they lost 1–0 to Chelsea. On 18 December 2018, with United in sixth, Mourinho was sacked. Former United striker Ole Gunnar Solskjær was appointed as caretaker manager until the end of the season. On 28 March 2019, after winning 14 of his first 19 matches in charge, Solskjær was appointed permanent manager on a three-year deal.

On 18 April 2021, Manchester United announced they were joining 11 other European clubs as founding members of the European Super League, a proposed 20-team competition intended to rival the UEFA Champions League. The announcement drew a significant backlash from supporters, other clubs, media partners, sponsors, players and the UK Government, forcing the club to withdraw just two days later. The failure of the project led to the resignation of executive vice-chairman Ed Woodward, while resultant protests against Woodward and the Glazer family led to a pitch invasion ahead of a league match against Liverpool on 2 May 2021, which saw the first postponement of a Premier League game due to supporter protests in the competition's history. On the pitch, United equalled their own record for the biggest win in Premier League history with a 9–0 win over Southampton on 2 February 2021, but ended the season with defeat on penalties in the UEFA Europa League final against Villarreal, going four straight seasons without a trophy. On 20 November 2021, Solskjær left his role as manager. Former midfielder Michael Carrick took charge for the following three games, before the appointment of Ralf Rangnick as interim manager until the end of the season.

On 21 April 2022, Erik ten Hag was appointed as the manager from the end of the 2021–22 season, and in his first season Manchester United won the 2022–23 EFL Cup, defeating Newcastle United in the final to end their longest period without a trophy since a six-year span between 1977 and 1983. On 5 March 2023, the club suffered their joint-heaviest defeat, losing 7–0 to rivals Liverpool at Anfield. At the end of the following season, the club finished eighth in the Premier League, their lowest league finish since the 1989–90 season, but went on to beat cross-city rivals Manchester City 2–1 in the FA Cup final, to win their 13th FA Cup title. On 28 October 2024, Ten Hag was sacked with the club 14th in the league and having recorded just four wins all season. The club appointed Sporting CP manager Ruben Amorim as head coach on 1 November 2024. They finished the season 15th in the Premier League, their worst league campaign since their relegation in 1973–74. The club reached the UEFA Europa League final, but lost 1–0 to Tottenham Hotspur. On 5 January 2026, Amorim was sacked, with under-18s manager and former United midfielder Darren Fletcher taking over on an interim basis, before Carrick was appointed as head coach until the end of the 2025–26 Premier League season. Following a successful spell that saw United finish third in the Premier League, in turn qualifying for next season's Champions League, Carrick was appointed head coach on a permanent basis until at least 2028. However, on 12 November 2026, with the team in the relegation zone for the first time after 40 years, Carrick was sacked. The next day on 13 November, United would then announce Mauricio Pochettino as their new head coach from 18 November, following the conclusion of his role as a head coach of the United States national team.

== Crest and colours ==
Manchester United badge in the 1960s

The club crest is derived from the Manchester City Council coat of arms, although all that remains of it on the current crest is the ship in full sail. The devil stems from the club's nickname "The Red Devils" inspired from Salford Rugby Club; it was included on club programmes and scarves in the 1960s, and incorporated into the club crest in 1970, although the crest was not included on the chest of the shirt until 1971. In 1975, the red devil ("A devil facing the sinister guardant supporting with both hands a trident gules") was granted as a heraldic badge by the College of Arms to the English Football League for use by Manchester United.

Newton Heath's uniform in 1879, four years before the club played its first competitive match, has been documented as "white with blue cord". A photograph of the Newton Heath team, taken in 1892, is believed to show the players wearing red-and-white quartered jerseys and navy blue knickerbockers. Between 1894 and 1896, the players wore green and gold jerseys which were replaced in 1896 by white shirts, which were worn with navy blue shorts.

After the name change in 1902, the club colours were changed to red shirts, white shorts, and black socks, which has become the standard Manchester United home kit. Very few changes were made to the kit until 1922 when the club adopted white shirts bearing a deep red "V" around the neck, similar to the shirt worn in the 1909 FA Cup final. They remained part of their home kits until 1927. For a period in 1934, the cherry and white hooped change shirt became the home colours, but the following season the red shirt was recalled after the club's lowest ever league placing of 20th in the Second Division and the hooped shirt dropped back to being the change.

The black socks were changed to white from 1959 to 1965, where they were replaced with red socks up until 1971 with white used on occasion, when the club reverted to black. Black shorts and white socks are sometimes worn with the home strip, most often in away games, if there is a clash with the opponent's kit. For 2018–19, black shorts and red socks became the primary choice for the home kit. Since 1997–98, white socks have been the preferred choice for European games, which are typically played on weeknights, to aid with player visibility. The current home kit is a red shirt with Adidas' trademark three stripes in red on the shoulders, white shorts, and black socks.

The Manchester United away strip has often been a white shirt, black shorts and white socks, but there have been several exceptions. These include an all-black strip with blue and gold trimmings between 1993 and 1995, the navy blue shirt with silver horizontal pinstripes worn during the 1999–2000 season, and the 2011–12 away kit, which had a royal blue body and sleeves with hoops made of small midnight navy blue and black stripes, with black shorts and blue socks. An all-grey away kit worn during the 1995–96 season was dropped after just five games; in its final outing against Southampton, Alex Ferguson instructed the team to change into the third kit during half-time. The reason for dropping it being that the players claimed to have trouble finding their teammates against the crowd, United failed to win a competitive game in the kit in five attempts. In 2001, to celebrate 100 years as "Manchester United", a reversible white and gold away kit was released, although the actual match day shirts were not reversible.

The club's third kit was traditionally all-blue; this was most recently the case during the 2014–15 season. Exceptions include a green-and-gold halved shirt worn between 1992 and 1994, a blue-and-white striped shirt worn during the 1994–95 and 1995–96 seasons and once in 1996–97, an all-black kit worn during the Treble-winning 1998–99 season, and a white shirt with black-and-red horizontal pinstripes worn between 2003–04 and 2005–06. From 2006–07 to 2013–14, the third kit was the previous season's away kit, albeit updated with the new club sponsor in 2006–07 and 2010–11, apart from the 2008–09 season, when an all-blue kit was launched to mark the 40th anniversary of the 1967–68 European Cup success.

== Grounds ==
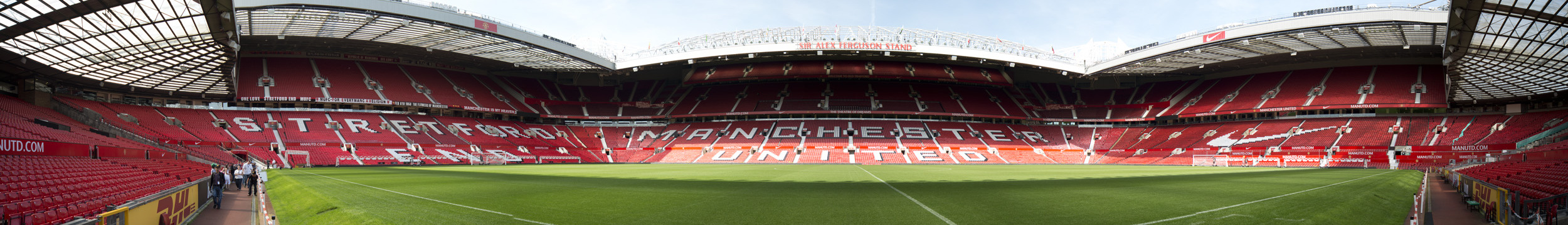
United's current ground, Old Trafford, after its expansion in 2006

=== 1878–1893: North Road ===
Newton Heath initially played on a field on North Road, close to the railway yard; the original capacity was about 12,000, but club officials deemed the facilities inadequate for a club hoping to join The Football League. Some expansion took place in 1887, and in 1891, Newton Heath used its minimal financial reserves to purchase two grandstands, each able to hold 1,000 spectators. Although attendances were not recorded for many of the earliest matches at North Road, the highest documented attendance was approximately 15,000 for a First Division match against Sunderland on 4 March 1893. A similar attendance was also recorded for a friendly match against Gorton Villa on 5 September 1889.

=== 1893–1910: Bank Street ===
In June 1893, after the club was evicted from North Road by its owners, Manchester Deans and Canons, who felt it was inappropriate for the club to charge an entry fee to the ground, secretary A. H. Albut procured the use of the Bank Street ground in Clayton. It initially had no stands, by the start of the 1893–94 season, two had been built; one spanning the full length of the pitch on one side and the other behind the goal at the "Bradford end". At the opposite end, the "Clayton end", the ground had been "built up, thousands thus being provided for". Newton Heath's first league match at Bank Street was played against Burnley on 1 September 1893, when 10,000 people saw Alf Farman score a hat-trick, Newton Heath's only goals in a 3–2 win. The remaining stands were completed for the following league game against Nottingham Forest three weeks later. In October 1895, before the visit of Manchester City, the club purchased a 2,000-capacity stand from the Broughton Rangers rugby league club, and put up another stand on the "reserved side" (as distinct from the "popular side"); however, weather restricted the attendance for the Manchester City match to just 12,000.

When the Bank Street ground was temporarily closed by bailiffs in 1902, club captain Harry Stafford raised enough money to pay for the club's next away game at Bristol City and found a temporary ground at Harpurhey for the next reserves game against Padiham. Following financial investment, new club president John Henry Davies paid £500 for the erection of a new 1,000-seat stand at Bank Street. Within four years, the stadium had cover on all four sides, as well as the ability to hold approximately 50,000 spectators, some of whom could watch from the viewing gallery atop the Main Stand.

=== 1910–present: Old Trafford ===
Following Manchester United's first league title in 1908 and the FA Cup a year later, it was decided that Bank Street was too restrictive for Davies' ambition; in February 1909, six weeks before the club's first FA Cup title, Old Trafford was named as the home of Manchester United, following the purchase of land for around £60,000. Architect Archibald Leitch was given a budget of £30,000 for construction; original plans called for seating capacity of 100,000, though budget constraints forced a revision to 77,000. The building was constructed by Messrs Brameld and Smith of Manchester. The stadium's record attendance was registered on 25 March 1939, when an FA Cup semi-final between Wolverhampton Wanderers and Grimsby Town drew 76,962 spectators.

Bombing in the Second World War destroyed much of the stadium; the central tunnel in the South Stand was all that remained of that quarter. After the war, the club received compensation from the War Damage Commission in the amount of £22,278. While reconstruction took place, the team played its "home" games at Manchester City's Maine Road ground; Manchester United was charged £5,000 per year, plus a nominal percentage of gate receipts. Later improvements included the addition of roofs, first to the Stretford End and then to the North and East Stands. The roofs were supported by pillars that obstructed many fans' views, and they were eventually replaced with a cantilevered structure. The Stretford End was the last stand to receive a cantilevered roof, completed in time for the 1993–94 season. First used on 25 March 1957 and costing £40,000, four 180-foot (55 m) pylons were erected, each housing 54 individual floodlights. These were dismantled in 1987 and replaced by a lighting system embedded in the roof of each stand, which remains in use today.

The Taylor Report's requirement for an all-seater stadium lowered capacity at Old Trafford to around 44,000 by 1993. In 1995, the North Stand was redeveloped into three tiers, restoring capacity to approximately 55,000. At the end of the 1998–99 season, second tiers were added to the East and West Stands, raising capacity to around 67,000, and between July 2005 and May 2006, 8,000 more seats were added via second tiers in the north-west and north-east quadrants. Part of the new seating was used for the first time on 26 March 2006, when an attendance of 69,070 became a new Premier League record. The record was pushed steadily upwards before reaching its peak on 31 March 2007, when 76,098 spectators saw Manchester United beat Blackburn Rovers 4–1, with just 114 seats (0.15 per cent of the total capacity of 76,212) unoccupied. In 2009, reorganisation of the seating resulted in a reduction of capacity by 255 to 75,957. In the 2023–24 season, Manchester United had the highest aggregate attendance in domestic league games at home among European clubs, with Borussia Dortmund recording the highest average attendance having played two fewer fixtures.

=== Proposed new ground ===
In 2021, United co-chairman Joel Glazer said that "early-stage planning work" for the redevelopment of Old Trafford was underway. This followed "increasing criticism" over the lack of development of the ground since 2006. After the club's takeover by Jim Ratcliffe in 2024, it emerged that plans were being made for the construction of a new, 100,000-capacity stadium near Old Trafford and that the current stadium would be downsized to serve as the home for the women's team and the club's academy. In November 2024, it was revealed that the majority of fans surveyed are in favour of a new-build rather than redevelopment.

On 11 March 2025, the club announced that it had retained Foster and Partners to construct a new, 100,000-capacity stadium adjacent to Old Trafford. The club claims they are consulting with fans on key aspects of the build. The new stadium is under consideration as a host venue for the 2035 FIFA Women's World Cup.

== Support ==
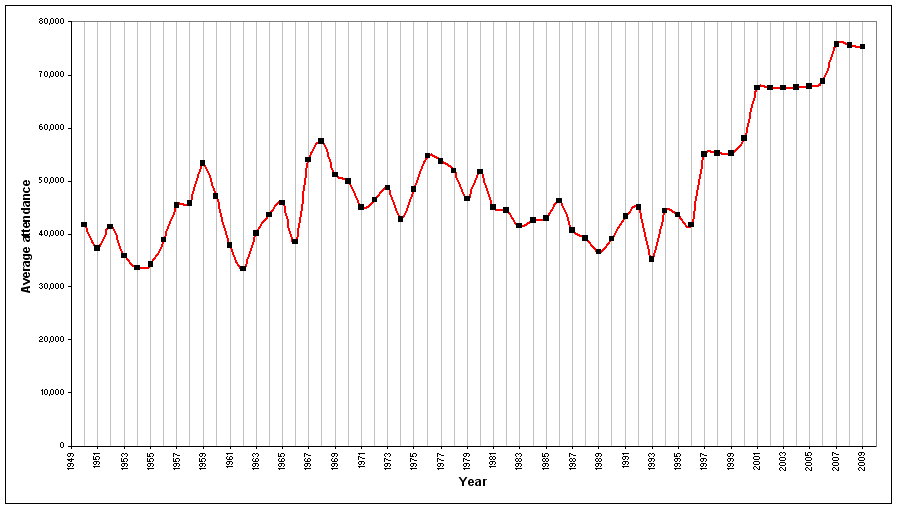
Average Old Trafford Manchester United attendance, 1949–2009

Manchester United is one of the most popular football clubs in the world, with one of the highest average home attendances in Europe. The club states that its worldwide fan base includes more than 200 officially recognised branches of the Manchester United Supporters Club (MUSC), in at least 24 countries. The club takes advantage of this support through its worldwide summer tours. Accountancy firm and sports industry consultants Deloitte estimate that Manchester United has 75 million fans worldwide. The club has the third highest social media following in the world among sports teams (after Barcelona and Real Madrid), with over 82 million Facebook followers as of July 2023. A 2014 study showed that Manchester United had the loudest fans in the Premier League.

Supporters are represented by two independent bodies; the Independent Manchester United Supporters' Association (IMUSA), which maintains close links to the club through the MUFC Fans Forum, and the Manchester United Supporters' Trust (MUST). After the Glazer family's takeover in 2005, a group of fans formed a splinter club, F.C. United of Manchester. The West Stand of Old Trafford – the "Stretford End" – is the home end and the traditional source of the club's most vocal support.

In March 2025, Manchester United officially launched their first Jewish supporters’ club. During the same year, the club also welcomed the "Stretford Sikhs", a non-geographic official supporters' club for Sikhs.

=== Rivalries ===
Manchester United has high-profile rivalries with Liverpool and local neighbours Manchester City. The club has also had rivalries throughout its history with the likes of Arsenal, Leeds United and Chelsea.

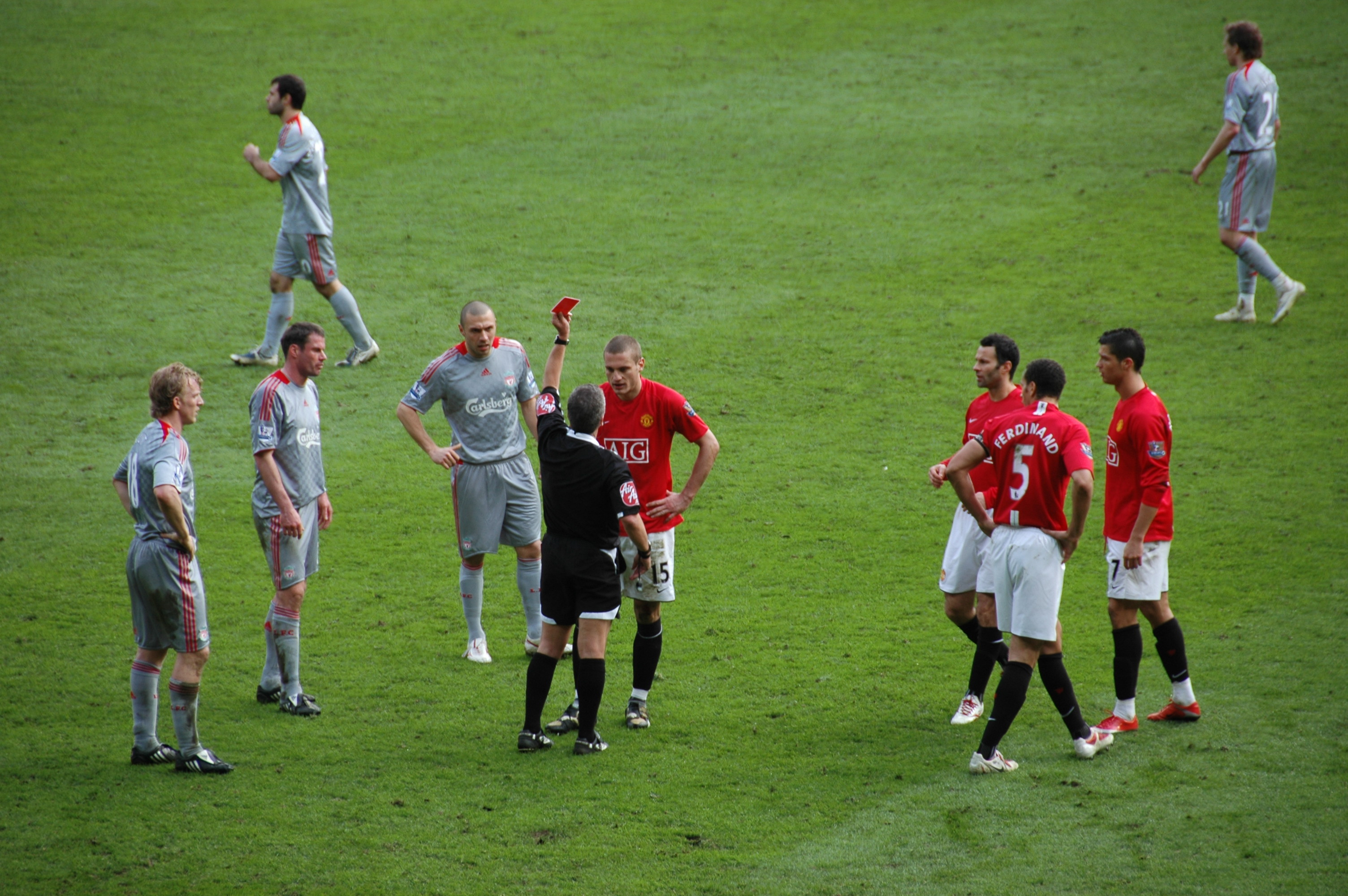
Liverpool v Manchester United at Old Trafford on 14 March 2009

The matches against Manchester City are known as the Manchester derby, as they are the two most important teams in the city of Manchester. It is considered one of the biggest local derbies in British football, particularly after City's rise to prominence in the 2010s and the two clubs fighting for trophies, such as the league title in 2012 and 2013, as well as two consecutive FA Cup finals in 2023 and 2024.

The rivalry with Liverpool is rooted in competition between the cities during the Industrial Revolution, when Manchester was famous for its textile industry while Liverpool was a major port. The two clubs are the most successful in the history of English football; between them they have won 40 league titles, 9 European Cups, 21 FA Cups, 16 League Cups, 4 UEFA Cup/Europa Leagues, 2 FIFA Club World Cups, 1 Intercontinental Cup, 37 FA Community Shields and 5 UEFA Super Cups. Ranked the two biggest clubs in England by France Football magazine based on metrics such as fanbase and historical importance, matches between Manchester United and Liverpool are considered to be the most famous fixture in English football and one of the biggest rivalries in the football world. As a result of the intensity of the rivalry no player has transferred directly between the clubs since 1964. Former Manchester United manager Alex Ferguson said in 2002, "My greatest challenge was knocking Liverpool right off their fucking perch".

The "Roses Rivalry" with Leeds stems from the Wars of the Roses, fought between the House of Lancaster and the House of York, with Manchester United representing Lancashire and Leeds representing Yorkshire.

The rivalry with Arsenal arose from the numerous times the two teams battled for the Premier League title, especially under managers Alex Ferguson and Arsène Wenger, who also had a heated personal rivalry. The fixture for part of this period was described as a "blockbuster".

== Global brand ==
Manchester United has been described as a global brand; a 2011 report by Brand Finance, valued the club's trademarks and associated intellectual property at £412 million – an increase of £39 million on the previous year, valuing it at £11 million more than the second best brand, Real Madrid – and gave the brand a strength rating of AAA (Extremely Strong). In July 2012, Manchester United was ranked first by Forbes magazine in its list of the ten most valuable sports team brands, valuing the Manchester United brand at $2.23 billion. The club is ranked third in the Deloitte Football Money League (behind Real Madrid and Barcelona). In January 2013, the club became the first sports team in the world to be valued at $3 billion. Forbes magazine valued the club at $3.3 billion – $1.2 billion higher than the next most valuable sports team. They were overtaken by Real Madrid for the next four years, but Manchester United returned to the top of the Forbes list in June 2017, with a valuation of $3.689 billion.

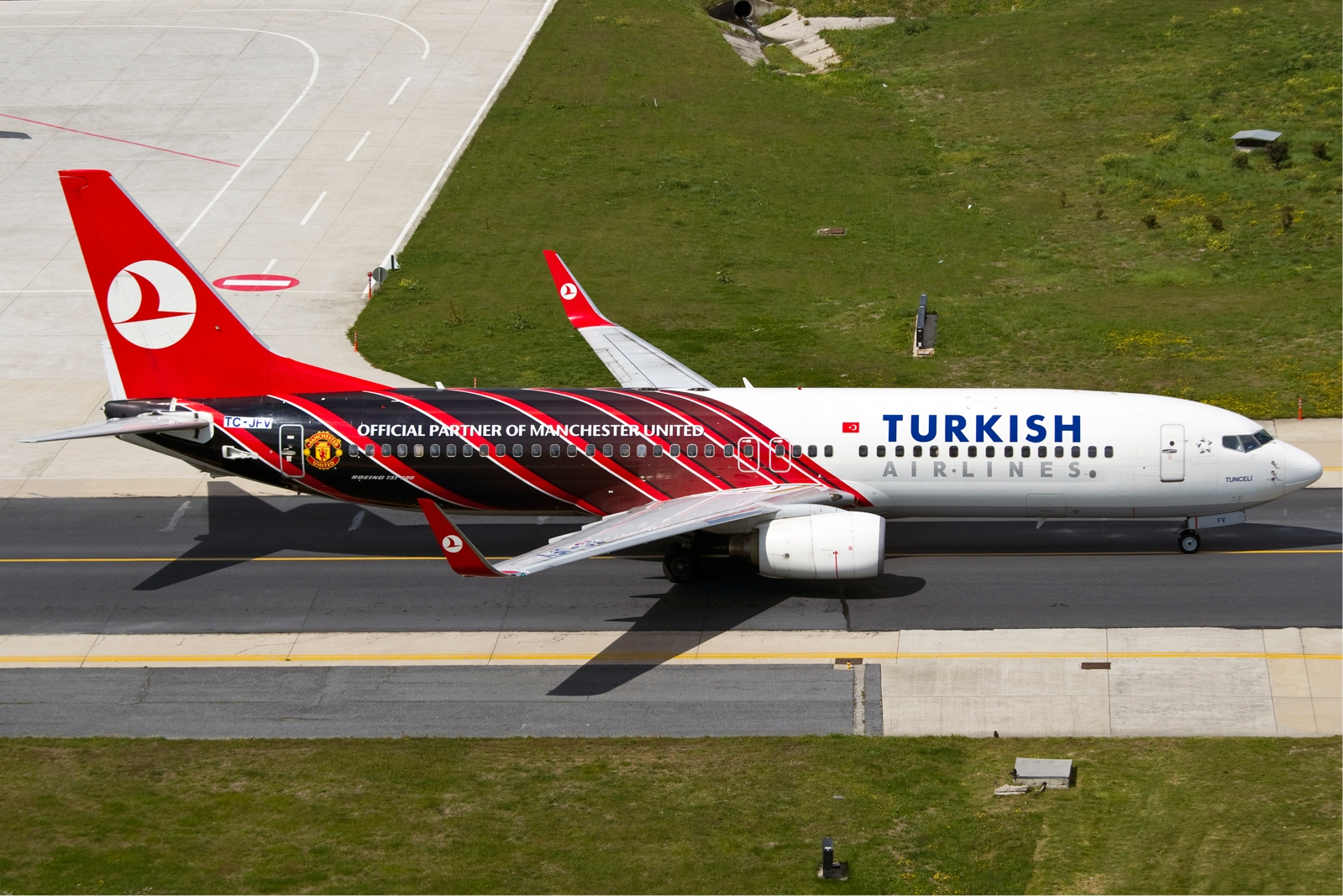
An official partner of the club, Turkish Airlines, in Manchester United livery

The core strength of Manchester United's global brand is often attributed to Matt Busby's rebuilding of the team and subsequent success following the Munich air disaster, which drew worldwide acclaim. The "iconic" team included Bobby Charlton and Nobby Stiles (members of England's World Cup-winning team), Denis Law and George Best. The attacking style of play adopted by this team (in contrast to the defensive-minded "catenaccio" approach favoured by the leading Italian teams of the era) "captured the imagination of the English footballing public". Busby's team also became associated with the liberalisation of Western society during the 1960s; George Best, known as the "Fifth Beatle" for his iconic haircut, was the first footballer to significantly develop an off-the-field media profile.

As the second English football club to float on the London Stock Exchange in 1991, the club raised significant capital, with which it further developed its commercial strategy. The club's focus on commercial and sporting success brought significant profits in an industry often characterised by chronic losses. The strength of the Manchester United brand was bolstered by intense off-the-field media attention to individual players, most notably David Beckham (who quickly developed his own global brand). This attention often generates greater interest in on-the-field activities, and hence generates sponsorship opportunities – the value of which is driven by television exposure. During his time with the club, Beckham's popularity across Asia was integral to the club's commercial success in that part of the world.

Because higher league placement results in a greater share of television rights, success on the field generates greater income for the club. Since the inception of the Premier League, Manchester United has received the largest share of the revenue generated from the BSkyB broadcasting deal. Manchester United has also consistently enjoyed the highest commercial income of any English club; in 2005–06, the club's commercial arm generated £51 million, compared to £42.5 million at Chelsea, £39.3 million at Liverpool, £34 million at Arsenal and £27.9 million at Newcastle United. A key sponsorship relationship was with sportswear company Nike, who managed the club's merchandising operation as part of a £303 million 13-year partnership between 2002 and 2015. Through Manchester United Finance and the club's membership scheme, One United, those with an affinity for the club can purchase a range of branded goods and services. Additionally, Manchester United-branded media services – such as the club's dedicated television channel, MUTV – have allowed the club to expand its fan base to those beyond the reach of its Old Trafford stadium.

=== Sponsorship ===
Period	Kit manufacturer	Shirt sponsor		
Period	Kit manufacturer	Chest	Sleeve	Back
1945–1975	Umbro	—	—	—
1975–1980	Admiral	—	—	—
1980–1982	Adidas	—	—	—
1982–1992	Adidas	Sharp Electronics	—	—
1992–2000	Umbro	Sharp Electronics	—	—
2000–2002	Umbro	Vodafone	—	—
2002–2006	Nike	Vodafone	—	—
2006–2010	Nike	AIG	—	—
2010–2014	Nike	Aon	—	—
2014–2015	Nike	Chevrolet	—	—
2015–2018	Adidas	Chevrolet	—	—
2018–2021	Adidas	Chevrolet	Kohler	—
2021–2022	Adidas	TeamViewer	Kohler	—
2022–2024	Adidas	TeamViewer	DXC Technology	—
2024–2026	Adidas	Snapdragon	DXC Technology	Microsoft Copilot+ PC (League Cup)
2026–	Adidas	Snapdragon	Sumup	Microsoft Surface (League Cup); Manchester United Foundation (Europe)

In an initial five-year deal worth £500,000, Sharp Electronics became the club's first shirt sponsor at the beginning of the 1982–83 season, a relationship that lasted until the end of the 1999–2000 season, when Vodafone agreed a four-year, £30 million deal. Vodafone agreed to pay £36 million to extend the deal by four years, but after two seasons triggered a break clause in order to concentrate on its sponsorship of the Champions League.

To commence at the start of the 2006–07 season, American insurance corporation AIG agreed a four-year £56.5 million deal which in September 2006 became the most valuable in the world. At the beginning of the 2010–11 season, American reinsurance company Aon became the club's principal sponsor in a four-year deal reputed to be worth approximately £80 million, making it the most lucrative shirt sponsorship deal in football history. Manchester United announced their first training kit sponsor in August 2011, agreeing a four-year deal with DHL reported to be worth £40 million; it is believed to be the first instance of training kit sponsorship in English football. The DHL contract lasted for over a year before the club bought back the contract in October 2012, although they remained the club's official logistics partner. The contract for the training kit sponsorship was then sold to Aon in April 2013 for a deal worth £180 million over eight years, which also included purchasing the naming rights for the Trafford Training Centre.

The club's first kit manufacturer was Umbro, until a five-year deal was agreed with Admiral Sportswear in 1975. Adidas won the contract in 1980, before Umbro started a second spell in 1992. That sponsorship lasted for ten years, followed by Nike's record-breaking £302.9 million deal, which lasted until 2015; 3.8 million replica shirts were sold in the first 22 months with the company. In addition to Nike and Chevrolet, the club also has several lower-level "platinum" sponsors, including Aon and Budweiser.

On 30 July 2012, United signed a seven-year deal with American automotive corporation General Motors, which replaced Aon as the shirt sponsor from the 2014–15 season. The new $80m-a-year shirt deal is worth $559m over seven years and features the logo of General Motors brand Chevrolet. Nike announced that they would not renew their kit supply deal with Manchester United after the 2014–15 season, citing rising costs. Since the start of the 2015–16 season, Adidas has manufactured Manchester United's kit as part of a world-record 10-year deal worth a minimum of £750 million. Plumbing products manufacturer Kohler became the club's first sleeve sponsor ahead of the 2018–19 season. Manchester United and General Motors did not renew their sponsorship deal, and the club subsequently signed a five-year, £235 million sponsorship deal with TeamViewer ahead of the 2021–22 season. At the end of the 2023–24 season, TeamViewer were replaced by Snapdragon, who agreed a deal worth more than £60 million a year to take over as the club's main sponsor. In August 2024, Snapdragon's parent company Qualcomm triggered an option to extend the deal by two years, taking it through to 2029.

== Ownership and finances ==
Originally funded by the Lancashire and Yorkshire Railway Company, the club became a limited company in 1892 and sold shares to local supporters for £1 via an application form. In 1902, majority ownership passed to the four local businessmen who invested £500 to save the club from bankruptcy, including future club president John Henry Davies. After his death in 1927, the club faced bankruptcy yet again, but was saved in December 1931 by James W. Gibson, who assumed control of the club after an investment of £2,000. Gibson promoted his son, Alan, to the board in 1948, but died three years later; the Gibson family retained ownership of the club through James' wife, Lillian, but the position of chairman passed to former player Harold Hardman.

Promoted to the board a few days after the Munich air disaster, Louis Edwards, a friend of Matt Busby, began acquiring shares in the club; for an investment of approximately £40,000, he accumulated a 54 per cent shareholding and took control in January 1964. When Lillian Gibson died in January 1971, her shares passed to Alan Gibson who sold a percentage of his shares to Louis Edwards' son, Martin, in 1978; Martin Edwards went on to become chairman upon his father's death in 1980. Media tycoon Robert Maxwell attempted to buy the club in 1984, but did not meet Edwards' asking price. In 1989, chairman Martin Edwards attempted to sell the club to Michael Knighton for £20 million, but the sale fell through and Knighton joined the board of directors instead.

Manchester United was floated on the stock market in June 1991 (raising £6.7 million), and received yet another takeover bid in 1998, this time from Rupert Murdoch's British Sky Broadcasting Corporation. This resulted in the formation of Shareholders United Against Murdoch – now the Manchester United Supporters' Trust – who encouraged supporters to buy shares in the club in an attempt to block any hostile takeover. The Manchester United board accepted a £623 million offer, but the takeover was blocked by the Monopolies and Mergers Commission at the final hurdle in April 1999. A few years later, a power struggle emerged between the club's manager, Alex Ferguson, and his horse-racing partners, John Magnier and J. P. McManus, who had gradually become the majority shareholders. In a dispute that stemmed from contested ownership of the horse Rock of Gibraltar, Magnier and McManus attempted to have Ferguson removed from his position as manager, and the board responded by approaching investors to attempt to reduce the Irishmen's majority.

=== Glazer ownership ===
In May 2005, Malcolm Glazer purchased the 28.7 per cent stake held by McManus and Magnier, thus acquiring a controlling interest through his investment vehicle Red Football Ltd in a highly leveraged takeover valuing the club at approximately £800 million (then approx. $1.5 billion). Once the purchase was complete, the club was taken off the stock exchange. Much of the takeover money was borrowed by the Glazers; the debts were transferred to the club. As a result, the club went from being debt-free to being saddled with debts of £540 million, at interest rates of between 7% and 20%.

In July 2006, the club announced a £660 million debt refinancing package, resulting in a 30 per cent reduction in annual interest payments to £62 million a year. In January 2010, with debts of £716.5 million ($1.17 billion), Manchester United further refinanced through a bond issue worth £504 million, enabling them to pay off most of the £509 million owed to international banks. The annual interest payable on the bonds – which were to mature on 1 February 2017 – is approximately £45 million per annum. Despite restructuring, the club's debt prompted protests from fans on 23 January 2010, at Old Trafford and the club's Trafford Training Centre. Supporter groups encouraged match-going fans to wear green and gold, the colours of Newton Heath. On 30 January, reports emerged that the Manchester United Supporters' Trust had held meetings with a group of wealthy fans, dubbed the "Red Knights", with plans to buying out the Glazers' controlling interest. The club's debts reached a high of £777 million in June 2007.

In August 2011, the Glazers were believed to have approached Credit Suisse in preparation for a $1 billion (approx. £600 million) initial public offering (IPO) on the Singapore stock exchange that would value the club at more than £2 billion; however, in July 2012, the club announced plans to list its IPO on the New York Stock Exchange instead. Shares were originally set to go on sale for between $16 and $20 each, but the price was cut to $14 by the launch of the IPO on 10 August, following negative comments from Wall Street analysts and Facebook's disappointing stock market debut in May. Even after the cut, Manchester United was valued at $2.3 billion, making it the most valuable football club in the world.

The New York Stock Exchange allows for different shareholders to enjoy different voting rights over the club. Shares offered to the public ("Class A") had 10 times lesser voting rights than shares retained by the Glazers ("Class B"). Initially in 2012, only 10% of shares were offered to the public. As of 2019, the Glazers retain ultimate control over the club, with over 70% of shares, and even higher voting power.

In 2012, The Guardian estimated that the club had paid a total of over £500 million in debt interest and other fees on behalf of the Glazers, and in 2019, reported that the total sum paid by the club for such fees had risen to £1 billion. At the end of 2019, the club had a net debt of nearly £400 million.

In 2023, the Glazers began soliciting bids for the sale of the club, and several bids were received. Jim Ratcliffe, who owns Ineos, and Hamad bin Jassim bin Jaber Al Thani, a Qatari sheikh, were the only bidders who had publicly declared their interest in a controlling share of the club. In March 2023, Finnish entrepreneur Thomas Zilliacus also made his interest in Manchester United public.

On 24 December 2023, it was announced that Ratcliffe had purchased 25 per cent of Manchester United, and that his Ineos Sport company was taking control of football operations. Ratcliffe's shareholdings increased to 28.94% in December 2024. The Glazers remain as majority shareholders.

Manchester United reported record revenues of £666.5 million in the year to June 2025 (up 0.7% from previous), but still a net loss of £33 million.

== Players ==
=== First-team squad ===
As of 1 September 2026

Note: Flags indicate national team as defined under FIFA eligibility rules; some limited exceptions apply. Players may hold more than one non-FIFA nationality.

No.	Pos.	Nation	Player
1	GK	BEL	Senne Lammens
2	DF	POR	Diogo Dalot
3	DF	MAR	Noussair Mazraoui
4	DF	NED	Matthijs de Ligt
5	DF	ENG	Harry Maguire
6	DF	ARG	Lisandro Martínez
7	MF	ENG	Mason Mount
8	MF	POR	Bruno Fernandes (captain)
9	FW	ENG	Marcus Rashford
10	FW	BRA	Matheus Cunha
11	FW	NED	Joshua Zirkzee
12	GK	WAL	Karl Darlow
13	DF	DEN	Patrick Dorgu
15	DF	FRA	Leny Yoro
16	FW	CIV	Amad Diallo

No.	Pos.	Nation	Player
17	MF	BRA	Andrey Santos
18	MF	BEL	Youri Tielemans
19	FW	CMR	Bryan Mbeumo
20	MF	CMR	Carlos Baleba
22	GK	ENG	Tom Heaton
23	DF	ENG	Luke Shaw
25	MF	URU	Manuel Ugarte
26	DF	ENG	Ayden Heaven
30	FW	SLO	Benjamin Šeško
31	FW	ENG	Shea Lacey
37	MF	ENG	Kobbie Mainoo
38	MF	ENG	Jack Fletcher
39	MF	SCO	Tyler Fletcher
41	DF	ENG	Harry Amass
45	GK	NIR	Dermot Mee

==== Out on loan ====
Note: Flags indicate national team as defined under FIFA eligibility rules; some limited exceptions apply. Players may hold more than one non-FIFA nationality.

No.	Pos.	Nation	Player
24	GK	CMR	André Onana (at Trabzonspor until 30 June 2027)
—	GK	TUR	Altay Bayındır (at Celta Vigo until 30 June 2027)

=== Under-21s and Academy ===
Players with at least one first-team appearance for Manchester United.

Note: Flags indicate national team as defined under FIFA eligibility rules; some limited exceptions apply. Players may hold more than one non-FIFA nationality.

No.	Pos.	Nation	Player
62	FW	ENG	Bendito Mantato

Out on loan

Note: Flags indicate national team as defined under FIFA eligibility rules; some limited exceptions apply. Players may hold more than one non-FIFA nationality.

No.	Pos.	Nation	Player
32	FW	DEN	Chido Obi (at Willem II until 30 June 2027)
36	FW	ENG	Ethan Wheatley (at Lincoln City until 30 June 2027)
44	MF	ENG	Dan Gore (at Luton Town until 30 June 2027)

=== Player of the Year awards ===
Team	First team		U21s (Note: U-23s (2016–2022))	U18s
Award	Sir Matt Busby Player of the Year	Players' Player of the Year	Denzil Haroun Reserve Team Player of the Year	Jimmy Murphy Young Player of the Year
Inaugurated	1987–88	2005–06	1989–90	1989–90
Holder (2025–26)	(Portugal) Bruno Fernandes	(Portugal) Bruno Fernandes	(Scotland) Tyler Fletcher	(England) JJ Gabriel

== First-team coaching staff ==
Mauricio Pochettino, the current head coach of Manchester United.

Position	Staff
Head coach	(Argentina) Mauricio Pochettino
Assistant head coaches	(Spain) Jesús Pérez (Argentina) Miguel D'Agostino
First-team coach & analyst	(England) Dr. Alec Scott
First-team goalkeeping coach	(Spain) Toni Jiménez
Assistant first-team goalkeeping coach	(England) Connor King
First-team and operations manager	(Portugal) Acácio Valentim
Performance director	(England) Dr. Sam Erith
Head of sports medicine	(England) Dr. Imtiaz Ahmad
Senior first-team doctor	(England) Dr. William Fotherby
Assistant first-team doctor	(England) Dr. Tony Gill
Head physiotherapist	(England) Jordan Reece
First-team physiotherapists	(Australia) Ibrahim Kerem (Portugal) António Lóio (England) Scott McAuley (England) Matt Konopinski
First-team lead soft tissue therapist	(England) Will Storey
First-team soft tissue therapists	(England) Alan Watmough (England) Andy Caveney (Brazil) Abner Bruzzichessi
Head of physical performance	(England) Dr. Ed Leng
First-team lead physical performance coach	(England) Charlie Owen
First-team strength and power coach	(England) Michael Clegg
First-team physical performance and reconditioning coach	(England) Michael Eglon
Sports scientists	(England) Alistair McBurnie (England) Thomas Bowley (Argentina) (Spain) Sebastiano Pochettino
Head of sports nutrition	(England) Marcus Hannon
First-team nutritionist	(Portugal) Filipe Sousa
Senior kit manager	(England) Stephen Aziz
Head of first-team performance analysis	(England) Ben Parker
First-team performance analysts	(England) Luke Lazenby (Japan) Kaita Hasegawa (England) Luke Wright (England) Lewis Rhodes

=== Managerial history ===
Dates	Name	Notes
1878–1892	Unknown	
1892–1900	(England) A. H. Albut	
1900–1903	(England) James West	
1903–1912	(England) Ernest Mangnall	
1912–1914	(England) John Bentley	
1914–1921	(England) Jack Robson	
1921–1926	(Scotland) John Chapman	
1926–1927	(England) Lal Hilditch	Player-manager
1927–1931	(England) Herbert Bamlett	
1931–1932	(England) Walter Crickmer	
1932–1937	(Scotland) Scott Duncan	
1937–1945	(England) Walter Crickmer	
1945–1969	(Scotland) Sir Matt Busby	
1958	(Wales) Jimmy Murphy	Caretaker manager
1969–1970	(England) Wilf McGuinness	
1970–1971	(Scotland) Sir Matt Busby	
1971–1972	(Republic of Ireland) Frank O'Farrell	
1972–1977	(Scotland) Tommy Docherty	
1977–1981	(England) Dave Sexton	
1981–1986	(England) Ron Atkinson	
1986–2013	(Scotland) Sir Alex Ferguson	
2013–2014	(Scotland) David Moyes	
2014	(Wales) Ryan Giggs	Interim player-manager
2014–2016	(Netherlands) Louis van Gaal	
2016–2018	(Portugal) José Mourinho	
2018–2021	(Norway) Ole Gunnar Solskjær	(Note: Solskjaer was initially appointed as interim manager; he was given the job permanently on 28 March 2019.)
2021	(England) Michael Carrick	Caretaker manager
2021–2022	(Germany) Ralf Rangnick	Interim manager
2022–2024	(Netherlands) Erik ten Hag	
2024	(Netherlands) Ruud van Nistelrooy	Interim head coach
2024–2026	(Portugal) Ruben Amorim	
2026	(Scotland) Darren Fletcher	Caretaker head coach
2026	(England) Michael Carrick	(Note: Carrick was initially appointed as interim head coach; he was given the job permanently on 21 May 2026.)
2026–present	(Argentina) Mauricio Pochettino	

== Management ==
=== Ownership ===
Person / People	Associated company	Shares	Ref.
Glazer Family	Red Football Shareholder Limited	71.06%	
Jim Ratcliffe	Ineos	28.94%	

=== Manchester United plc ===
Position	Name
Executive co-chairmen & directors	Avram Glazer; Joel Glazer
Chief executive officer	Omar Berrada
Chief executive officer, new stadium development	Collette Roche
Chief financial officer	Roger Bell
Chief operations officer	Gary Hemingway
Chief communications officer	Toby Craig
Chief business officer	Marc Armstrong
General counsel	Martin Mosley
Directors	Kevin Glazer; Bryan Glazer; Darcie Glazer Kassewitz; Edward Glazer; John Reece; Rob Nevin
Independent directors	Robert Leitão; John Hooks

=== Manchester United Football Club ===
Office	Name
Life president	Martin Edwards
Directors	Avram Glazer; Joel Glazer; Kevin Glazer; Bryan Glazer; Darcie Glazer Kassewitz; Edward Glazer; John Reece; Rob Nevin; Omar Berrada; Michael Edelson; Sir Alex Ferguson; David Gill
Head of international football relations	Jean-Claude Blanc
Director of football	Jason Wilcox
Director of recruitment	Christopher Vivell
Head of senior scouting	Kyle Macaulay
Head of academy scouting	Connor Hunter
Head of loans & pathways	Gareth Whalley
Director of football negotiations	Matt Hargreaves
Director of football operations	Ameesh Manek
Director of performance	Sam Erith
Director of data & AI	Mike Sansoni
People director	Kirstin Furber
Club secretary	Rebecca Britain

== Honours ==
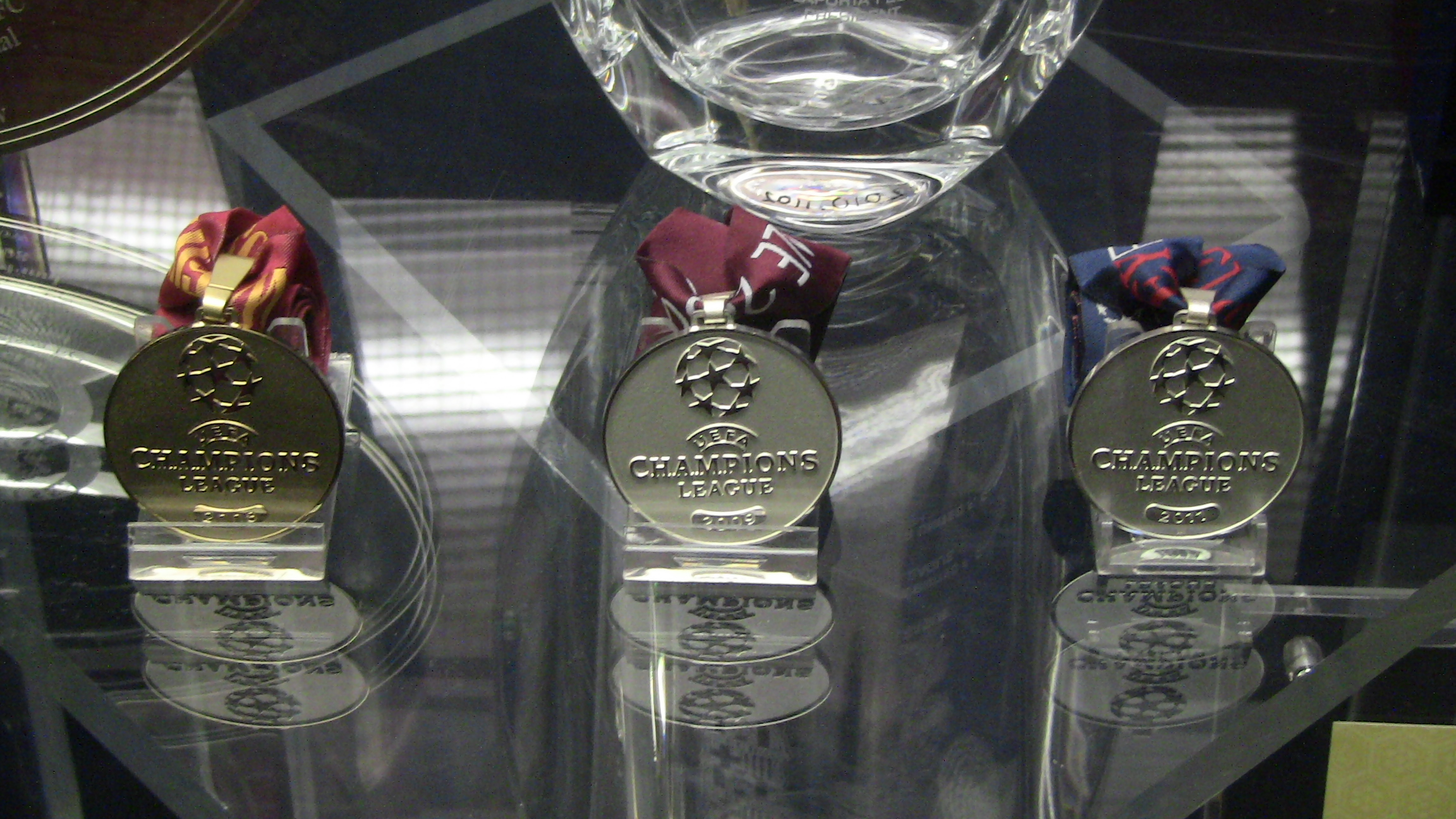
Winner's and runners'-up medals from Manchester United's UEFA Champions League final appearances in 2008, 2009 and 2011

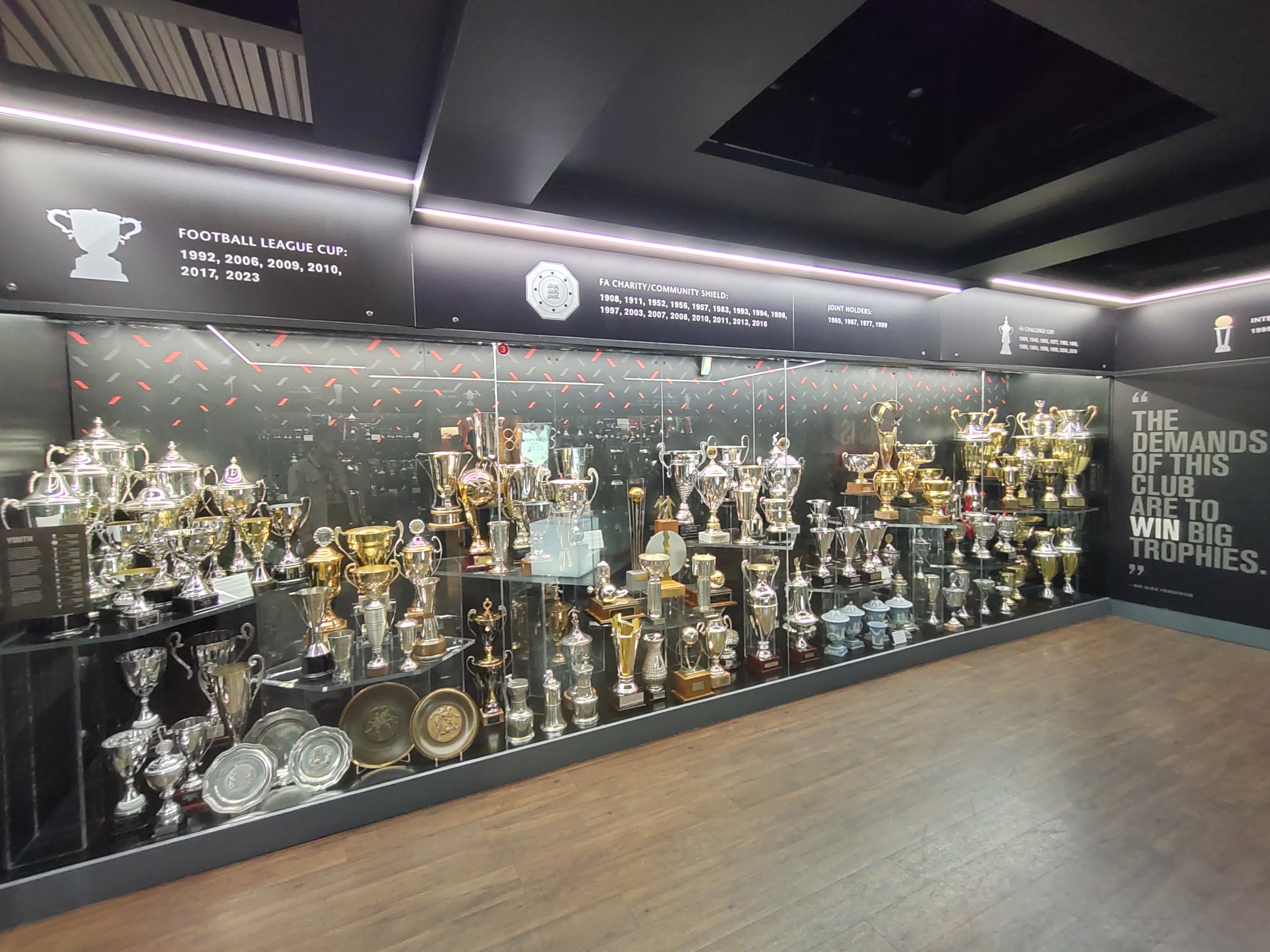
Trophies won by Manchester United on display in the club museum

Manchester United is one of the most successful clubs in Europe in terms of trophies won. The club's first trophy was the Manchester Cup, which they won as Newton Heath LYR in 1886. In 1908, the club won their first league title, and won the FA Cup for the first time the following year. Since then, they have gone on to win a joint-record 20 top-division titles – including a record 13 Premier League titles – and their total of 13 FA Cups is second only to Arsenal (14). Those titles have meant the club has appeared a record 30 times in the FA Community Shield (formerly the FA Charity Shield), which is played at the start of each season between the winners of the league and FA Cup from the previous season; of those 30 appearances, Manchester United have won a record 21, including four times when the match was drawn and the trophy shared by the two clubs.

The club had a successful period under the management of Matt Busby, starting with the FA Cup in 1948 and culminating with becoming the first English club to win the European Cup in 1968, winning five league titles and two FA Cups in the intervening years. The club's most successful decade, however, came in the 1990s under Alex Ferguson; five league titles, four FA Cups, one League Cup, five Charity Shields (one shared), one UEFA Champions League, one UEFA Cup Winners' Cup, one UEFA Super Cup and one Intercontinental Cup. The club has won the Double (winning the Premier League and FA Cup in the same season) three times; the second in 1995–96 saw them become the first club to do so twice, and it became referred to as the "Double Double". United became the sole British club to win the Intercontinental Cup in 1999 and are one of only three British clubs to have won the FIFA Club World Cup, in 2008. In 1999, United became the first English club to win the Treble. In 2017, United won the 2016–17 UEFA Europa League, beating Ajax in the final. In winning that title, United became the fifth club to have won the "European Treble" of European Cup/UEFA Champions League, Cup Winners' Cup, and UEFA Cup/Europa League after Juventus, Ajax, Bayern Munich and Chelsea.

The club's most recent trophy is the 2023–24 FA Cup.

Manchester United's honours
Type	Competition	Titles	Seasons
Domestic	First Division/Premier League (Note: Upon its formation in 1992, the Premier League became the top tier of English football; the Football League First and Second Divisions then became the second and third tiers, respectively. From 2004, the First Division became the Championship and the Second Division became League One.)	20^{s}	1907–08, 1910–11, 1951–52, 1955–56, 1956–57, 1964–65, 1966–67, 1992–93, 1993–94, 1995–96, 1996–97, 1998–99, 1999–2000, 2000–01, 2002–03, 2006–07, 2007–08, 2008–09, 2010–11, 2012–13
Domestic	Second Division	2	1935–36, 1974–75
Domestic	FA Cup	13	1908–09, 1947–48, 1962–63, 1976–77, 1982–83, 1984–85, 1989–90, 1993–94, 1995–96, 1998–99, 2003–04, 2015–16, 2023–24
Domestic	Football League Cup/EFL Cup	6	1991–92, 2005–06, 2008–09, 2009–10, 2016–17, 2022–23
Domestic	FA Charity Shield/FA Community Shield	21	1908, 1911, 1952, 1956, 1957, 1965*, 1967*, 1977*, 1983, 1990*, 1993, 1994, 1996, 1997, 2003, 2007, 2008, 2010, 2011, 2013, 2016 (* shared)
Continental	European Cup/UEFA Champions League	3	1967–68, 1998–99, 2007–08
Continental	European Cup Winners' Cup	1	1990–91
Continental	UEFA Europa League	1	2016–17
Continental	UEFA Super Cup	1	1991
Worldwide	FIFA Club World Cup	1	2008
Worldwide	Intercontinental Cup	1	1999

- record
- ^{s} shared record

=== Doubles and Trebles ===
- Doubles
  - League and FA Cup (3): 1993–94, 1995–96, 1998–99
  - League and UEFA Champions League (2): 1998–99, 2007–08
  - League and EFL Cup (1): 2008–09
  - EFL Cup and UEFA Europa League (1): 2016–17
- Trebles
  - League, FA Cup and UEFA Champions League (1): 1998–99

Short competitions, comprising a single or two games – such as the FA Charity/Community Shield, Intercontinental Cup (now defunct), FIFA Club World Cup or UEFA Super Cup – are not generally considered to contribute towards a Double or Treble.

== Manchester United Women ==
Manchester United Supporters Club Ladies began operations in the late 1970s and was unofficially recognised as the club's senior women's team. They became founding members of the North West Women's Regional Football League in 1989. The team made an official partnership with Manchester United in 2001, becoming the club's official women's team; however, in 2005, following Malcolm Glazer's takeover, the club was disbanded as it was seen to be "unprofitable". In 2018, Manchester United formed a new women's football team, which entered the second division of women's football in England for their debut season. The women's football team won their first trophy on 12 May 2024 as they lifted the Women's FA Cup as they defeated Tottenham Hotspur 4–0.

== See also ==
- List of world champion football clubs
- List of football clubs in England
