= New Birmingham City Stadium =

Planned football stadium in Birmingham, England

- Interactive map of New Birmingham City Stadium
- Location: Bordesley Green, Birmingham, England
- Coordinates: 52.480833°N 1.862778°W
- Owner: Birmingham City F.C.
- Operator: Birmingham City F.C.
- Capacity: 62,000

Construction
- Opened: 2029 (planned)
- Cost: £3bn (estimated)
- Architects: Heatherwick Studio & MANICA

Tenant
- Birmingham City (planned)

The New Birmingham City Stadium is a proposed multi-purpose stadium to be built in Bordesley Green, Birmingham. It would become the new home of EFL Championship club Birmingham City, replacing the club's current stadium, St Andrew's, where they have played since 1906.

== Planning history ==
=== City of Birmingham Stadium ===
In 2004, a 55,000-capacity City of Birmingham Stadium was suggested as a part of a proposed "sports village" in Birmingham. The stadium was to house Birmingham City, who would help to fund the project along with Birmingham City Council and casino group Las Vegas Sands. The feasibility of the plan depended on the government issuing a licence for a super casino, but this did not happen, and the project was abandoned.

=== Current proposal ===
On 13 July 2023, Shelby Companies Limited (SCL) became part-owners of Birmingham City. Since then, plans to replace the club's current home, St Andrew's, began resurfacing. On 9 April 2024, SCL acquired a plot of land in Bordesley Green to use for a new stadium. The 48-acre site is the former home of Birmingham Wheels, a local short-track motor racing park.

The plan is to create a "Sports Quarter" around the ground, similar to the Etihad Campus at Manchester City. This idea was sparked by former NFL player and Birmingham City minority investor Tom Brady, who visited the complex in Manchester in December 2023. If completed, the Sports Quarter will create as many as 8,400 jobs. The new stadium itself has been described as a "super stadium" with a capacity of approximately 60,000 spectators. This will make it the largest stadium in the Midlands, and rank amongst some of the largest in England. It will not only house Birmingham City men's team, but their women's team and academy teams too. Furthermore, the Sports Quarter will include training pitches for the entire club. The hope is that the project will be completed in time for the 2029–30 season, but Birmingham City co-owner Tom Wagner has admitted that this goal is optimistic.

On 5 February 2025, a £100m investment was injected into the project, whilst also receiving government backing from Lisa Nandy, the Secretary of State for Culture, Media and Sport, who announced that it would be an "exciting venture that highlights how sport can be an important driver for regeneration and growth". On 21 October 2025, Wagner announced that the stadium would be designed by the London-based Heatherwick Studio and Kansas-based architects MANICA. The design prominently features 12 brick chimneys, reflecting a brickworks that once stood on the site, as well as a retractable roof, a movable pitch, and a sky bar. In May 2026, a corporation aimed with speeding up the development of the stadium named the Birmingham East Mayoral Development Corporation (BEMDC) was created, the largest mayoral development corporation in the United Kingdom since the London Legacy Development Corporation that was set up for the 2012 Summer Olympics.

== Naming rights ==
On 23 October 2025, Tom Wagner announced that the stadium's naming rights would "go to the highest bidder".

== Transport ==
The current plan for transport links to the new stadium is to greatly improve the tram network in the area. However, there is also an idea to build a £20m tunnel that runs electric buses from the railway at Birmingham New Street to the stadium complex. This would help to connect the project to the new HS2 line that is set to be completed by 2035.
