= Jim Ratcliffe =

British engineer and businessman (born 1952)

Sir Jim Ratcliffe FIChemE
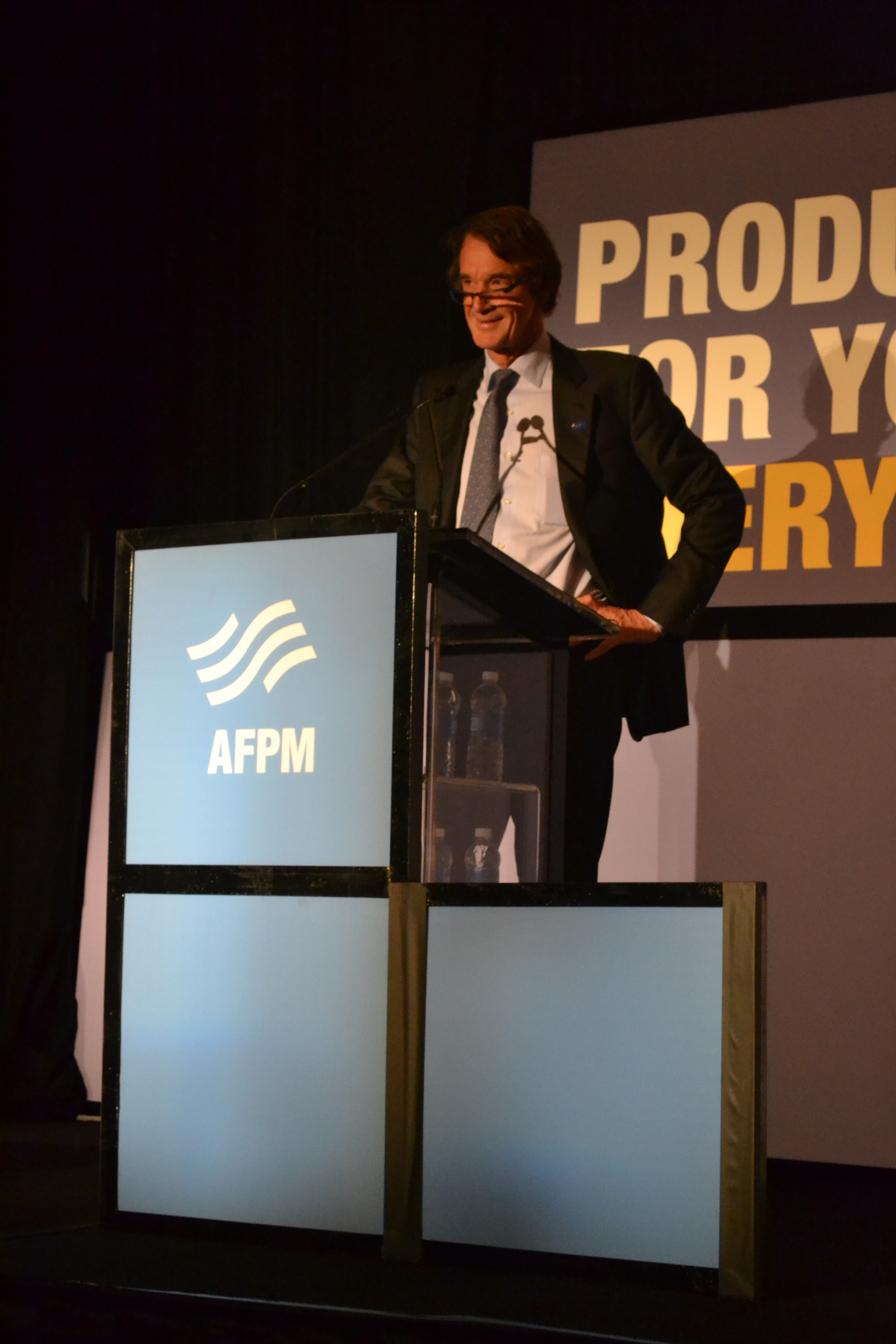
- Ratcliffe in 2013
- Born: James Arthur Ratcliffe; 18 October 1952 (age 73); Failsworth, Lancashire, England
- Education: University of Birmingham (BSc); London Business School (MBA)
- Occupations: Chairman, CEO and founder of INEOS
- Spouse: Catherine Polli
- Children: 3

Sir James Arthur Ratcliffe (born 18 October 1952) is a British billionaire, chemical engineer, and businessman. Ratcliffe is the chairman and chief executive officer (CEO) of the INEOS chemicals group, which he founded in 1998.

In May 2018, Ratcliffe was the richest person in the UK, with a net worth of £21.05 billion. As of May 2023, the Sunday Times Rich List 2023 estimated his net worth at £29.6 billion, making him the second wealthiest figure in the UK. In September 2020, Ratcliffe officially changed his tax residence from Hampshire to Monaco, a move that it is estimated will save him £4 billion in tax.

In February 2024, Ratcliffe became a minority shareholder in the English football club Manchester United and gained control over sporting operations.

== Early life and education ==
Ratcliffe was born in Failsworth, Lancashire (now in Greater Manchester), where his father worked as a joiner and went on to run a factory that made laboratory furniture. His mother worked in an accounts office. He was raised in a council house in the town until the age of 10, when the family moved to East Yorkshire. He was educated at Beverley Grammar School. In 1974, he graduated with a 2:1 in chemical engineering from the University of Birmingham.

== Career ==
After graduating, Ratcliffe worked at the oil firm BP but was fired after 3 days. The reason given for his dismissal was that he had eczema, which made him unfit to work around toxic chemicals. This was a medical condition that BP had overlooked prior to Ratcliffe joining. After leaving BP he took up a position as a trainee accountant at a pharmaceuticals company.

A few years later, Ratcliffe joined oil giant Esso. From 1978 to 1980, Esso funded his MBA at the London Business School. Ratcliffe went on to work for the fabric and chemicals producer Courtaulds, where he stayed until his mid-thirties. In 1989, he joined US private equity group Advent International.

=== INEOS ===
Ratcliffe was a co-founder of Inspec, which leased the former BP Chemicals site in Antwerp, Belgium. In 1998, Ratcliffe formed INEOS in Hampshire to buy-out Inspec and the freehold of the Antwerp site.

From this small base, using high-yield debt to finance deals, Ratcliffe started buying unwanted operations from groups such as ICI and BP, selecting targets based on their potential to double their earnings over a five-year period. In 2006, INEOS bought BP's refining and petrochemical arm Innovene, giving INEOS refineries and plants in Scotland, Italy, Germany, France, Belgium and Canada.

The company acquired Norsk Hydro's polymers business in 2007, allowing INEOS to expand its presence in the European polymers market, particularly in polyvinyl chloride (PVC) production, significantly strengthening its market position.

In April 2010, Ratcliffe moved INEOS's head office from Hampshire to Rolle, Switzerland, cutting the amount of tax the company paid by £100 million a year.

In 2015, Ratcliffe opened the UK headquarters of the chemicals and energy group in Knightsbridge, London, along with gas and oil trading, and other functions, saying he was "very cheerful about coming back to the UK". He was pleased with UK policy and London as a business base, and untroubled by the prospect of Brexit. Full year 2015 EBITDA was €577 million compared to €253 million for 2014.

In the Sunday Times Rich List 2018, he was named as the richest man in the UK, with a net worth of £21.05 billion.

In February 2019, it was announced that INEOS would invest £1bn in the UK oil and chemical industries, to include an overhaul of the Forties pipeline system that is responsible for transporting a significant percentage of the UK's North Sea oil and gas.

On 1 May 2019, Ratcliffe criticised the current government rules that say fracking in Britain must be suspended every time a 0.5 magnitude tremor is detected, which has led to a de facto ban on fracking, calling the government "pathetic".

Ineos Automotive was founded by Ratcliffe, initially to build a replacement for his Land Rover Defender. He unsuccessfully approached Jaguar Land Rover to buy the tooling to continue production after the original model was cancelled. Instead, in 2019 Ratcliffe formed partnerships with BMW and Magna Steyr to design and build a similar vehicle under the codename Projekt Grenadier. The 5-door Grenadier Station Wagon went into production in October 2022, followed by the launch of the Quartermaster utility vehicle in 2023.

=== Energy transition ===
In October 2021, Ratcliffe announced plans to invest more than €2 billion (£1.7 billion) into electrolysis projects to make zero-carbon green hydrogen across Europe. He said the first units will produce clean hydrogen through the electrolysis of water in Norway, powered by renewable electricity, and will serve as a hub to provide gas for the country's transport industry. This will be followed by projects in Germany and Belgium. Ratcliffe also intends to invest in France and the UK, where his hydrogen business will be headquartered.

=== Environmental pollution ===
In March 2019, INEOS said it would close its Middlesbrough manufacturing plant, unless it is allowed to "defer compliance" with EU rules designed to prevent air and water pollution. An analysis of data from the Environment Agency (EA) also reveals the plant clocked up 176 permit violations between 2014 and 2017. An EA spokesperson said: "Air emissions are well over legal limits and this poses a risk to the environment". INEOS director Tom Crotty said the firm "cannot justify" the investment required to comply with EU air and water pollution rules due to come into force in the coming years.

INEOS has carried out small projects in bio ethanol production using Clostridium bacteria, but it has had problems because the syngas has levels of hydrogen cyanide too high for the bacteria to survive. INEOS sold its US plant to Alliance Bio-Products in 2017.

== Sport ==
Ratcliffe is keen on sport, and in 2013, he completed the Marathon Des Sables across the Sahara Desert. He has founded a charity "Go Run for Fun", encouraging thousands of children aged between five and ten to get active by creating celebrity-driven events. He supported the 2019 INEOS 1:59 Challenge, a successful effort by Eliud Kipchoge to run the classic marathon distance (42.195 kilometres or 26 miles 385 yards) under 2 hours.

He purchased Lausanne-Sport, a Swiss Super League club, in 2017. Through INEOS, he bought Nice in 2019 from Chinese-American entrepreneur Chien Lee.

Following the 2022 Russian invasion of Ukraine, sanctions on Roman Abramovich, long-term owner of Premier League side Chelsea, forced him to put the club up for sale. Ratcliffe made a £4.25 billion bid to buy the club but this was rejected. Chelsea FC were eventually sold to US businessman Todd Boehly.

In August 2022, Ratcliffe expressed interest in buying the Premier League club Manchester United, a team he has supported since childhood. The following January, INEOS announced publicly that it had entered into the formal process of bidding for Manchester United, after the current owners announced it was looking for new investors. On 24 December 2023, Manchester United announced that Ratcliffe had acquired a 25 percent stake in the club, marking a significant development, as INEOS Sport assumed control over football operations. The purchase was completed in February 2024. He went on to oversee the culling of up to 450 jobs, as well as stopping the policy of free meals for club staff.

In sailing, Ratcliffe partnered with Ben Ainslie to form INEOS Team UK to compete (unsuccessfully) for the 36th America's Cup in 2021, with Ratcliffe reportedly investing over £110 million in the project. INEOS Britannia is the British Challenger of Record representing Royal Yacht Squadron Ltd for the 37th America's Cup, being held in Barcelona in October 2024.

In January 2025 Ben Ainslie split from Ineos Britannia America's Cup sailing team.

Ratcliffe purchased the Team Sky cycling franchise in 2019, subsequently rebranded Team INEOS. Their first competitive race under the new INEOS sponsorship, was the 2019 Tour de Yorkshire. They subsequently won the 2019 Tour de France and 2021 Giro d'Italia with the Colombian rider Egan Bernal.

In July 2025, David Rozman, a long-serving carer for the INEOS Grenadiers cycling team, left the Tour de France following an International Testing Agency (ITA) investigation. The investigation concerns alleged 2012 text messages between him and convicted doping doctor Mark Schmidt.

In 2020, INEOS became principal partners of Mercedes AMG F1, signing a five-year agreement with the team.

In 2021, Greenpeace criticised a decision by New Zealand Rugby to accept six years of sponsorship from INEOS as being inconsistent with the country's "clean green" values.

In February 2025, New Zealand Rugby initiated legal proceedings against INEOS for breach of contract, threatening to sue for damages when INEOS wanted to end their sponsorship agreement early. Both parties announced a settlement to avoid a lengthy court battle, with The Guardian reporting that they are satisfied with the outcome.

In May 2025, The New York Times reported that INEOS was exploring the sale of Ligue 1 club Nice.

== Honours and awards ==
In May 2009, Ratcliffe was granted an honorary fellowship by the Institution of Chemical Engineers citing "his sustained leadership in building the INEOS Group." In 2013, he received the Petrochemical Heritage Award. Ratcliffe was appointed Knight Bachelor in the 2018 Birthday Honours for services to business and to investment.

== Personal life ==
Ratcliffe has two sons with previous wife Amanda Townson, and one daughter from a previous relationship with Italian tax lawyer Maria Alessia Maresca. He is married to Catherine Polli.

Ratcliffe enjoys sport and physical adventure, and has made expeditions to the North and South Poles, as well as a three-month motorbike trek in South Africa. In 2013, he completed the Marathon Des Sables across the Sahara Desert, and founded the charity Go Run for Fun, which creates celebrity-led events to encourage five-to-ten-year-olds to get physically active. Another charity, the Jim Ratcliffe Foundation, helped build a new ski clubhouse in Courchevel to help underprivileged children learn to ski. The Charity Commission for England and Wales has opened an investigation into this charity over a regulatory compliance concern after a donation to a private ski resort.

Ratcliffe splits his time between Hampshire and Monaco. In 2017, he submitted his fifth plan to build a luxury home at Thorns Beach near Beaulieu in Hampshire, which would replace an existing two-bedroom bungalow. In September 2020, he officially changed his tax residence from Hampshire to Monaco, which was estimated to save him £4 billion in tax. He owns an estate on the shores of Lake Geneva in Switzerland, as well as the hotels Le Portetta in Courchevel and Lime Wood in Hampshire.

Ratcliffe has owned two super yachts by Feadship: Hampshire and Hampshire II. His first yacht was built by Feadship under the name Barbara Jean, and was later sold. In 2012, he took delivery of the 78-metre (256 ft) Hampshire II, built by Royal Van Lent, which he still owns.

== Political views ==
=== Brexit ===
Ratcliffe supported the UK leaving the European Union. Ratcliffe is a Eurosceptic and said in 2019, "As a business, INEOS supported the common market, but not a United States of Europe". He is opposed to the "layers and layers" of European legislation that he feels is making European economies increasingly cumbersome and inefficient. He has publicly expressed his disdain for politicians, criticising them for the way they negotiated the Brexit withdrawal agreement, and how they are often "happy to lunch around bankers" but less keen to discuss economic issues with industrialists and business owners.

=== Immigration ===
On 12 February 2026, Ratcliffe stated that the UK has been "colonised by immigrants" during an interview by Ed Conway of Sky News. Ratcliffe also criticised the number of people receiving state benefits. His claim was criticised by some football fans, union leaders, anti-racism campaigners and politicians. Manchester United put out a statement in response to his claims and their Sikh fan group stated that his claims were offensive. Government ministers including Keir Starmer and Rachel Reeves labelled Ratcliffe's comments 'offensive and wrong' and 'disgusting' respectively, and asked Ratcliffe to apologise.

Ratcliffe later apologised that his "choice of language has offended some people in the UK and Europe," but qualified his apology saying "it is important to raise the issue of controlled and well-managed immigration that supports economic growth."

== See also ==
- Ineos Group Limited
- List of British billionaires by net worth
