= Omar Berrada =

Moroccan and French businessman (born 1978)

- عمر برادة
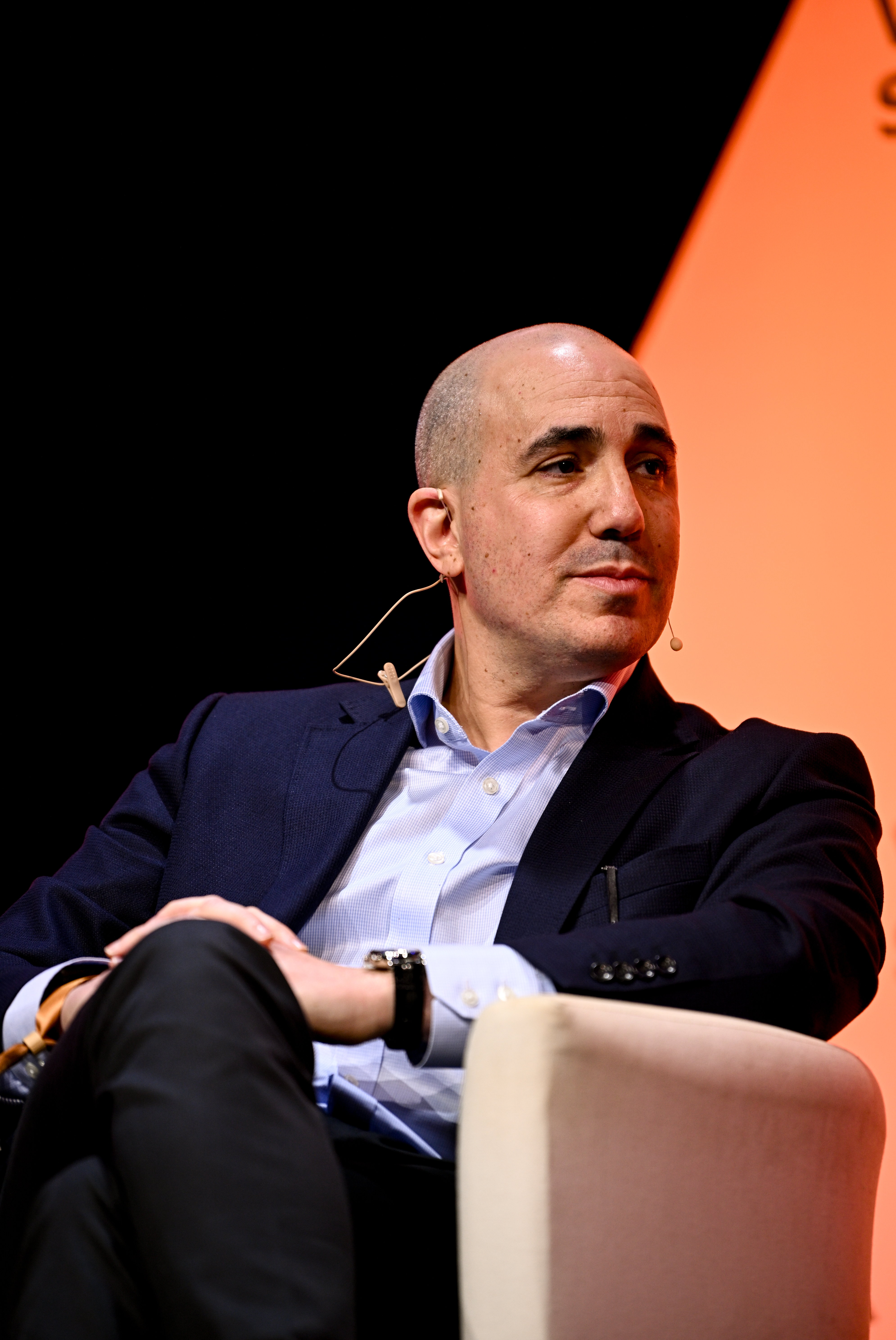
- Berrada in 2024
- Born: 18 April 1978 (age 48); Paris, France
- Education: EU Business School
- Occupation: Football club chief executive officer
- Organization: Manchester United

Omar Berrada (Arabic: عمر برادة; born 18 April 1978) is a Moroccan and French businessman who has been the chief executive officer of English Premier League side Manchester United since July 2024.

== Early life and education ==
Berrada was born in Paris to Moroccan parents and raised in the United States. He briefly attended a university in Massachusetts, intending to pursue an engineering degree, but withdrew after six months. In 2001, at the age of 23, he relocated to Barcelona, citing a desire to live in Europe and his support for the club as key motivations. He later graduated with a degree in Business Administration from EU Business School in Spain.

== Career ==
Before entering the football industry, Berrada worked in the telecommunications sector, beginning his career at Tiscali, where he first encountered opportunities that would later lead him into sport. In 2004, he joined Barcelona as marketing manager after being recruited by the club’s newly appointed chief marketing officer, formerly the CEO of Tiscali Spain. Berrada remained at Barcelona until 2011, during a period that overlapped with the tenure of Pep Guardiola and the involvement of Ferran Soriano and Txiki Begiristain.

In 2011, Berrada joined Manchester City after being approached by a London-based headhunter. He initially led the club’s international business department, organizing preseason tours and managing regional partnerships. He was soon promoted to Director of Partnerships, working closely with Soriano, who had joined the club as CEO of City Football Group. In 2016, Berrada was appointed Chief Operating Officer, relocating from London to Manchester. In this role, he managed City’s daily operations and was considered a key deputy to Soriano.

Though his remit was primarily administrative, Berrada began assisting sporting director Begiristain in football operations, including player acquisitions. He was involved in the 2018 transfer of Aymeric Laporte and was reportedly present during final contract negotiations. In 2020, Berrada was appointed Chief Football Operations Officer. This marked a shift away from commercial responsibilities toward direct involvement in football-related matters, including recruitment strategy.

According to The Athletic, Berrada was approached by NFL franchises in 2023, though he remained committed to Manchester City at the time. In 2024, he was appointed Chief Executive Officer of Manchester United, becoming what some outlets described as "United's first outside hire for the CEO role".

== Personal life ==
Berrada met his wife while working at telecommunications company Tiscali.
