= 1984–85 Manchester United F.C. season =

English football club season

Manchester United
1984–85 season
- Chairman: Martin Edwards
- Manager: Ron Atkinson
- First Division: 4th
- FA Cup: Winners
- League Cup: Third round
- UEFA Cup: Quarter-finals
- Top goalscorer: League: Mark Hughes (16); All: Mark Hughes (24)
- Highest home attendance: 56,638 vs Liverpool (22 September 1984)
- Lowest home attendance: 28,383 vs Burnley (26 September 1984)
- Average home league attendance: 41,772
Home colours	Away colours	Third colours

The 1984–85 season was Manchester United's 83rd season in the Football League, and their 10th consecutive season in the top division of English football. They defeated Everton 1–0 in the FA Cup Final to win the trophy for the sixth time, and finished fourth in the league. It was the first season at the club for new signings Gordon Strachan, Jesper Olsen and Alan Brazil, while Mark Hughes became established in the forward line alongside Frank Stapleton, with Norman Whiteside moving into central midfield to replace the departed Ray Wilkins. Hughes ended the season as United's top scorer with 24 goals (16 in the league) and was also voted PFA Young Player of the Year. Brazil, however, failed to establish himself as a regular player, with Atkinson alternating between him and Frank Stapleton as the club's second striker to play alongside the prolific Hughes.

United began the season with four successive draws, having led in three of them, and remained unbeaten in their opening 11 matches (eight in the league) before going down 3–0 at Aston Villa. Their next away trip resulted in a 5–0 thrashing at Everton, and league form was somewhat erratic throughout the season. Before Christmas, United squandered 2–0 leads in further defeats at Sunderland and Nottingham Forest, and on Boxing Day they were beaten 2–1 at bottom club Stoke City, again after taking the lead.

United entered 1985 unbeaten at Old Trafford to stay in contention at the top of the table, but lost successive home matches to Sheffield Wednesday and Coventry City, before embarking on a 10-match unbeaten run which took in big wins over Villa (Hughes scoring a hat-trick) and Stoke. Defeats at Hillsborough and Luton – not to mention the exceptional form of a resurgent Everton – effectively ended United's title hopes, and a 5–1 defeat at Watford in their final fixture saw them overhauled by both Liverpool and Tottenham Hotspur to finish fourth.

By that stage, the players' thoughts were probably elsewhere as they prepared for an FA Cup Final showdown with champions Everton. United's path to Wembley had seen them ease past Bournemouth, Coventry, Blackburn Rovers and West Ham United to set up a semi-final clash with Liverpool. United led twice but had to settle for a 2–2 draw, and a Paul McGrath own goal left them trailing at half-time in the replay before fine goals by Bryan Robson and Hughes saw them through.

An uneventful final came to life 12 minutes from time when, with the score goalless, Kevin Moran was dismissed by referee Peter Willis for a 'professional foul' on Peter Reid – the first ever sending-off in an FA Cup final. United's ten men held on to force extra time, where they found extra reserves of energy and won the trophy thanks to Whiteside's brilliant curling effort in the 110th minute.

United exited the Milk Cup at the third round stage as Everton came from behind to beat them 2–1 at Old Trafford. The UEFA Cup campaign took United to the quarter-final but defeat on penalties against Videoton of Hungary would prove to be their final European fixture for five years. They had qualified to compete in the 1985–86 European Cup Winners' Cup, as the Heysel disaster involving Liverpool and Juventus fans at the European Cup final 11 days later resulted in all English clubs being banned from European competitions for an indefinite period. The ban would not be lifted until 1990.

== First Division ==
Date	Opponents	H / A	Result F–A	Scorers	Attendance
25 August 1984	Watford	H	1–1	Strachan (pen)	53,668
28 August 1984	Southampton	A	0–0		22,183
1 September 1984	Ipswich Town	A	1–1	Hughes	20,876
5 September 1984	Chelsea	H	1–1	Olsen	48,398
8 September 1984	Newcastle United	H	5–0	Olsen, Strachan 2 (1 pen), Hughes, Moses	54,915
15 September 1984	Coventry City	A	3–0	Whiteside 2, Robson	18,312
22 September 1984	Liverpool	H	1–1	Strachan (pen)	56,638
29 September 1984	West Bromwich Albion	A	2–1	Robson, Strachan (pen)	26,292
6 October 1984	Aston Villa	A	0–3		37,131
13 October 1984	West Ham United	H	5–1	McQueen, Brazil, Strachan, Moses, Hughes	47,559
20 October 1984	Tottenham Hotspur	H	1–0	Hughes	54,516
27 October 1984	Everton	A	0–5		40,742
2 November 1984	Arsenal	H	4–2	Robson, Strachan 2, Hughes	32,279
10 November 1984	Leicester City	A	3–2	Brazil, Hughes, Strachan (pen)	23,840
17 November 1984	Luton Town	H	2–0	Whiteside 2	41,630
24 November 1984	Sunderland	A	2–3	Robson, Hughes	25,405
1 December 1984	Norwich City	H	2–0	Robson, Hughes	36,635
8 December 1984	Nottingham Forest	A	2–3	Strachan 2 (1 pen)	25,902
15 December 1984	Queens Park Rangers	H	3–0	Brazil, Duxbury, Gidman	36,134
22 December 1984	Ipswich Town	H	3–0	Gidman, Robson, Strachan (pen)	35,168
26 December 1984	Stoke City	A	1–2	Stapleton	20,985
29 December 1984	Chelsea	A	3–1	Hughes, Moses, Stapleton	42,197
1 January 1985	Sheffield Wednesday	H	1–2	Hughes	47,625
12 January 1985	Coventry City	H	0–1		35,992
2 February 1985	West Bromwich Albion	H	2–0	Strachan 2	36,681
9 February 1985	Newcastle United	A	1–1	Moran	32,555
23 February 1985	Arsenal	A	1–0	Whiteside	48,612
2 March 1985	Everton	H	1–1	Olsen	51,150
12 March 1985	Tottenham Hotspur	A	2–1	Hughes, Whiteside	42,908
15 March 1985	West Ham United	A	2–2	Stapleton, Robson	16,674
23 March 1985	Aston Villa	H	4–0	Hughes 3, Whiteside	40,941
31 March 1985	Liverpool	A	1–0	Stapleton	34,886
3 April 1985	Leicester City	H	2–1	Robson, Stapleton	35,950
6 April 1985	Stoke City	H	5–0	Hughes 2, Olsen 2, Whiteside	42,940
9 April 1985	Sheffield Wednesday	A	0–1		39,380
21 April 1985	Luton Town	A	1–2	Whiteside	10,320
24 April 1985	Southampton	H	0–0		31,291
27 April 1985	Sunderland	H	2–2	Robson, Moran	38,979
4 May 1985	Norwich City	A	1–0	Moran	15,502
6 May 1985	Nottingham Forest	H	2–0	Gidman, Stapleton	41,775
11 May 1985	Queens Park Rangers	A	3–1	Brazil 2, Strachan	20,483
13 May 1985	Watford	A	1–5	Moran	20,500

Pos	Team	Pld	W	D	L	GF	GA	GD	Pts	Qualification or relegation
2	Liverpool	42	22	11	9	68	35	+33	77	Qualified for the Football League Super Cup and disqualified from the UEFA Cup
3	Tottenham Hotspur	42	23	8	11	78	51	+27	77	Qualified for the Football League Super Cup and disqualified from the UEFA Cup
4	Manchester United (Note: Manchester United would have qualified for the Cup Winners' Cup as FA Cup winners.)	42	22	10	10	77	47	+30	76	Qualified for the Football League Super Cup and disqualified from the European Cup Winners' Cup
5	Southampton	42	19	11	12	56	47	+9	68	Qualified for the Football League Super Cup and disqualified from the UEFA Cup
6	Chelsea	42	18	12	12	63	48	+15	66	

Source: World Football
Rules for classification: 1) Points; 2) Goal difference; 3) Goals scored

== FA Cup ==
Date	Round	Opponents	H / A	Result F–A	Scorers	Attendance
5 January 1985	Round 3	Bournemouth	H	3–0	McQueen, Stapleton, Strachan	32,080
26 January 1985	Round 4	Coventry City	H	2–1	Hughes, McGrath	38,039
15 February 1985	Round 5	Blackburn Rovers	A	2–0	Strachan, McGrath	22,692
9 March 1985	Round 6	West Ham United	H	4–2	Hughes, Whiteside 3 (1 pen)	46,769
13 April 1985	Semi-final	Liverpool	N	2–2	Robson, Stapleton	51,690
17 April 1985	Semi-final; Replay	Liverpool	N	2–1	Robson, Hughes	45,775
18 May 1985	Final	Everton	N	1–0	Whiteside	100,000

== League Cup ==
Date	Round	Opponents	H / A	Result F–A	Scorers	Attendance
26 September 1984	Round 2 First leg	Burnley	H	4–0	Robson, Hughes 3	28,383
9 October 1984	Round 2 Second leg	Burnley	A	3–0	Brazil 2, Olsen	12,690
30 October 1984	Round 3	Everton	H	1–2	Brazil	50,918

== UEFA Cup ==
Date	Round	Opponents	H / A	Result F–A	Scorers	Attendance
19 September 1984	Round 1 First leg	Rába ETO Győr	H	3–0	Robson, Mühren, Hughes	33,119
3 October 1984	Round 1 Second leg	Rába ETO Győr	A	2–2	Brazil, Mühren (pen)	26,000
24 October 1984	Round 2 First leg	PSV Eindhoven	A	0–0		27,500
7 November 1984	Round 2 Second leg	PSV Eindhoven	H	1–0	Strachan (pen)	39,281
28 November 1984	Round 3 First leg	Dundee United	H	2–2	Strachan (pen), Robson	48,278
12 December 1984	Round 3 Second leg	Dundee United	A	3–2	Hughes, McGinnis (og), Mühren	21,821
6 March 1985	Quarter-final; First leg	Videoton	H	1–0	Stapleton	35,432
20 March 1985	Quarter-final; Second leg	Videoton	A	0–1 (4–5 p)		25,000

== Squad statistics ==
Pos.	Name	League		FA Cup		League Cup		UEFA Cup		Total	
Pos.	Name	Apps	Goals	Apps	Goals	Apps	Goals	Apps	Goals	Apps	Goals
GK	(England) Gary Bailey	38	0	6	0	3	0	8	0	55	0
GK	(England) Stephen Pears	4	0	1	0	0	0	0	0	5	0
DF	(Scotland) Arthur Albiston	39	0	7	0	3	0	8	0	57	0
DF	(England) Mike Duxbury	27(3)	1	2(1)	0	2	0	6	0	37(4)	1
DF	(England) Billy Garton	2	0	0	0	1	0	0(1)	0	3(1)	0
DF	(England) John Gidman	27	3	6	0	1	0	6(1)	0	40(1)	3
DF	(Scotland) Graeme Hogg	29	0	5	0	3	0	6	0	43	0
DF	(Republic of Ireland) Paul McGrath	23	0	7	2	0	0	2	0	32	2
DF	(Scotland) Gordon McQueen	12	1	1	1	0	0	2	0	15	2
DF	(Republic of Ireland) Kevin Moran	19	4	3	0	2	0	4	0	28	4
MF	(Wales) Clayton Blackmore	1	0	0	0	1	0	0	0	2	0
MF	(Scotland) Arthur Graham	0	0	0	0	1	0	0	0	1	0
MF	(England) Remi Moses	26	3	3	0	3	0	6	0	38	3
MF	(Netherlands) Arnold Mühren	7(5)	0	1	0	1	0	3	3	12(5)	3
MF	(Denmark) Jesper Olsen	36	5	6	0	2	1	6(1)	0	50(1)	6
MF	(England) Bryan Robson	32(1)	9	4	2	2	1	7	2	45(1)	14
MF	(Scotland) Gordon Strachan	41	15	7	2	2	0	6	2	56	19
MF	(Northern Ireland) Norman Whiteside	23(4)	9	6	4	1	0	4(1)	0	34(5)	13
FW	(Scotland) Alan Brazil	17(3)	5	0(1)	0	2(1)	3	2	1	21(5)	9
FW	(Wales) Mark Hughes	38	16	7	3	2	3	8	2	55	24
FW	(Republic of Ireland) Frank Stapleton	21(3)	6	5	2	1(1)	0	4(1)	1	31(5)	9
–	Own goals	–	0	–	0	–	0	–	1	–	1

== Transfers ==
=== In ===
Date	Pos.	Name	From	Fee	Ref.
June 1984	FW	(Scotland) Alan Brazil	Tottenham Hotspur	£625k	
29 June 1984	MF	(Denmark) Jesper Olsen	(Netherlands) Ajax	£350k	
1 July 1984	MF	(Scotland) Gordon Strachan	(Scotland) Aberdeen	£600k	

=== Out ===
Date	Pos.	Name	To	Fee	Ref.
May 1984	MF	(England) Ray Wilkins	(Italy) Milan	£1.5m	
July 1984	FW	(Scotland) Scott McGarvey	Portsmouth	£85k	
July 1984	FW	(Scotland) Lou Macari	Swindon Town	Free	
May 1985	GK	(England) Jeff Wealands	Altrincham		
