= 1985–86 Manchester United F.C. season =

English football club season

Manchester United
1985–86 season
- Chairman: Martin Edwards
- Manager: Ron Atkinson
- First Division: 4th
- FA Cup: Fifth round
- League Cup: Fourth round
- Football League Super Cup: Group stage
- Charity Shield: Runners-up
- Top goalscorer: League: Mark Hughes (17); All: Mark Hughes (18)
- Highest home attendance: 54,575 vs Tottenham Hotspur (16 November 1985)
- Lowest home attendance: 20,130 vs Norwich City (6 November 1985)
- Average home league attendance: 42,821
Home colours	Away colours	Third colours

The 1985–86 season was Manchester United's 84th season in the Football League, and their 11th consecutive season in the top division of English football.

Despite having won the FA Cup the previous season, the team was unable to compete in the 1985–86 European Cup Winners' Cup due to the five-year ban on English clubs competing in European competitions that was imposed following the Heysel Stadium disaster at the 1985 European Cup Final. Instead, the clubs who would have qualified for Europe all competed in the Football League Super Cup.

With no European action to distract them, they got off to a 10-match winning start in the league. They were unbeaten from their first 15 games with 41 points as at 2 November with 13 wins and 2 draws. The size of their lead at that point helped them stay top of the league until the beginning of February, despite taking only 35 points from their last 27 games and finishing fourth in the league on 76 points, 12 points behind champions Liverpool. There was no success in the cup competitions to fall back on, leading to doubts about the future of Ron Atkinson as manager. He had completed five seasons as manager without them finishing outside the top four and had won two FA Cups, but the wait for a league title was now entering its 20th season.

Media reports linked two managers with a move to Old Trafford: Terry Venables, who had just rejected an offer to return to England from Barcelona to take charge at Arsenal; and Alex Ferguson, whose Aberdeen side had broken the Old Firm dominance of Celtic and Rangers in recent seasons. Despite this speculation, Atkinson remained in charge of United into the following season, but the pressure on him to deliver success to the club remained intense.

The ban on English clubs in European competitions was extended to a second season, meaning that United would not be able to compete in the 1986–87 UEFA Cup.

Mark Hughes was once again United's top scorer, scoring 17 goals in the league and 18 in all competitions. However, he was less prolific during the second half of the season after scoring 11 times before Christmas, and on 21 March 1986 it was announced that he would be leaving United at the end of the season to sign for FC Barcelona of Spain in a £2million deal. United had already signed Nottingham Forest striker Peter Davenport as his successor. United had signed another striker, Terry Gibson from Coventry City, just after the turn of the new year.

United's title challenge was also not helped by the fact that captain Bryan Robson was only available for half of the club's league games this season due to injuries.

== FA Charity Shield ==
Date	Opponents	H / A	Result F–A	Scorers	Attendance
10 August 1985	Everton	N	0–2		82,000

== First Division ==
Date	Opponents	H / A	Result F–A	Scorers	Attendance	League position
17 August 1985	Aston Villa	H	4–0	Whiteside 48', Hughes (2) 50', 75', Olsen 84'	49,743	1st
20 August 1985	Ipswich Town	A	1–0	Robson 63'	18,777	1st
24 August 1985	Arsenal	A	2–1	Hughes 20', McGrath 65'	37,145	1st
26 August 1985	West Ham United	H	2–0	Strachan 47', Hughes 55'	50,773	1st
31 August 1985	Nottingham Forest	A	3–1	Hughes 2', Barnes 5', Stapleton 41'	26,274	1st
4 September 1985	Newcastle United	H	3–0	Stapleton (2) 5', 11', Hughes 62'	51,102	1st
7 September 1985	Oxford United	H	3–0	Whiteside 29', Robson 44', Barnes 72'	51,820	1st
14 September 1985	Manchester City	A	3–0	Robson 8' (pen.), Albiston 19', Duxbury 73'	48,773	1st
21 September 1985	West Bromwich Albion	A	5–1	Brazil (2) 6', 80', Strachan 22', Blackmore 71', Stapleton 73'	25,068	1st
28 September 1985	Southampton	H	1–0	Hughes 75'	52,449	1st
5 October 1985	Luton Town	A	1–1	Hughes 61'	17,454	1st
12 October 1985	Queens Park Rangers	H	2–0	Hughes 31', Olsen 52'	48,845	1st
19 October 1985	Liverpool	H	1–1	McGrath 65'	54,492	1st
26 October 1985	Chelsea	A	2–1	Olsen 41', Hughes 76'	42,485	1st
2 November 1985	Coventry City	H	2–0	Olsen (2) 18', 41'	46,748	1st
9 November 1985	Sheffield Wednesday	A	0–1		48,105	1st
16 November 1985	Tottenham Hotspur	H	0–0		54,575	1st
23 November 1985	Leicester City	A	0–3		22,008	1st
30 November 1985	Watford	H	1–1	Brazil 68'	42,181	1st
7 December 1985	Ipswich Town	H	1–0	Stapleton 30'	37,981	1st
14 December 1985	Aston Villa	A	3–1	Blackmore 19', Strachan 67', Hughes 71'	27,626	1st
21 December 1985	Arsenal	H	0–1		44,386	1st
26 December 1985	Everton	A	1–3	Stapleton 14'	42,551	1st
1 January 1986	Birmingham City	H	1–0	C. Gibson 50'	43,095	1st
11 January 1986	Oxford United	A	3–1	Whiteside 11', Hughes 74', C. Gibson 83'	13,280	1st
18 January 1986	Nottingham Forest	H	2–3	Olsen (2) 46' (pen.), 67'	46,717	1st
2 February 1986	West Ham United	A	1–2	Robson 26'	22,642	2nd
9 February 1986	Liverpool	A	1–1	C. Gibson 15'	35,064	2nd
22 February 1986	West Bromwich Albion	H	3–0	Olsen (3) 26' (pen.), 53' (pen.), 70'	45,193	2nd
1 March 1986	Southampton	A	0–1		19,012	2nd
15 March 1986	Queens Park Rangers	A	0–1		23,407	3rd
19 March 1986	Luton Town	H	2–0	Hughes 37', McGrath 76'	33,668	3rd
22 March 1986	Manchester City	H	2–2	C. Gibson 2', Strachan 58' (pen.)	51,274	3rd
29 March 1986	Birmingham City	A	1–1	Robson 84'	22,551	3rd
31 March 1986	Everton	H	0–0		51,189	3rd
5 April 1986	Coventry City	A	3–1	C. Gibson 13', Robson 28', Strachan 82'	17,160	3rd
9 April 1986	Chelsea	H	1–2	Olsen 68' (pen.)	45,355	3rd
13 April 1986	Sheffield Wednesday	H	0–2		32,331	3rd
16 April 1986	Newcastle United	A	4–2	Robson 2' (pen.), Hughes (2) 17', 44', Whiteside 50'	31,840	3rd
19 April 1986	Tottenham Hotspur	A	0–0		32,357	3rd
26 April 1986	Leicester City	H	4–0	Stapleton 17', Hughes 83', Blackmore 85', Davenport 87' (pen.)	38,840	3rd
3 May 1986	Watford	A	1–1	Hughes 23'	18,414	4th

Pos	Team	Pld	W	D	L	GF	GA	GD	Pts	Qualification or relegation
2	Everton (Note: Since the FA Cup winners, Liverpool, would have instead qualified for the European Cup, qualification would have instead been passed down to runners-up Everton.)	42	26	8	8	87	41	+46	86	Disqualified from the European Cup Winners' Cup
3	West Ham United	42	26	6	10	74	40	+34	84	Disqualified from the UEFA Cup
4	Manchester United	42	22	10	10	70	36	+34	76	Disqualified from the UEFA Cup
5	Sheffield Wednesday (Note: Since Everton would have instead qualified for the European Cup Winners' Cup, UEFA Cup qualification would have been passed down to Sheffield Wednesday.)	42	21	10	11	63	54	+9	73	Disqualified from the UEFA Cup
6	Chelsea	42	20	11	11	57	56	+1	71	

Source: World Football
Rules for classification: 1) Points; 2) Goal difference; 3) Goals scored

== FA Cup ==
Date	Round	Opponents	H / A	Result F–A	Scorers	Attendance
9 January 1986	Round 3	Rochdale	H	2–0	Stapleton 15', Hughes 68'	40,223
25 January 1986	Round 4	Sunderland	A	0–0		35,484
29 January 1986	Round 4 Replay	Sunderland	H	3–0	Whiteside 28', Olsen (2) 38', 54' (pen.)	43,402
5 March 1986	Round 5	West Ham United	A	1–1	Stapleton 73'	26,441
9 March 1986	Round 5 Replay	West Ham United	H	0–2		30,441

== Football League Cup ==
Date	Round	Opponents	H / A	Result F–A	Scorers	Attendance
24 September 1985	Round 2 First leg	Crystal Palace	A	1–0	Barnes 59'	21,507
9 October 1985	Round 2 Second leg	Crystal Palace	H	1–0	Whiteside 1'	26,118
29 October 1985	Round 3	West Ham United	H	1–0	Whiteside 77'	32,056
26 November 1985	Round 4	Liverpool	A	1–2	McGrath 7'	41,291

== Football League Super Cup ==
Date	Round	Opponents	H / A	Result F–A	Scorers	Attendance
18 September 1985	Group stage	Everton	H	2–4	Robson 45' (pen.), Stapleton 61'	33,859
6 November 1985	Group stage	Norwich City	H	1–1	Whiteside 68' (pen.)	20,130
4 December 1985	Group stage	Everton	A	0–1		20,542
11 December 1985	Group stage	Norwich City	A	1–1	C. Gibson 64'	15,449

Group 1
Pos.	Team	Pld.	W	D	L	GF	GA	GD	Pts.
1	Everton	4	3	0	1	6	3	+3	9
2	Norwich City	4	1	2	1	3	3	0	5
3	Manchester United	4	0	2	2	4	7	–3	2

Pld = Matches played; W = Matches won; D = Matches drawn; L = Matches lost; GF = Goals for; GA = Goals against; GD = Goal difference; Pts = Points

== Squad statistics ==
Pos.	Name	League		FA Cup		League Cup		Other		Total	
Pos.	Name	Apps	Goals	Apps	Goals	Apps	Goals	Apps	Goals	Apps	Goals
GK	(England) Gary Bailey	25	0	2	0	4	0	3	0	34	0
GK	(England) Chris Turner	17	0	3	0	0	0	2	0	22	0
DF	(Scotland) Arthur Albiston	37	1	5	0	3	0	3	0	48	1
DF	(Wales) Clayton Blackmore	12	3	2(2)	0	2	0	4	0	20(2)	3
DF	(England) Mike Duxbury	21(2)	1	3	0	3	0	2	0	29(2)	1
DF	(England) Billy Garton	10	0	1	0	0	0	1	0	12	0
DF	(England) John Gidman	24	0	2	0	1	0	3	0	30	0
DF	(England) Mark Higgins	6	0	2	0	0	0	0	0	8	0
DF	(Scotland) Graeme Hogg	17	0	0	0	2	0	2	0	21	0
DF	(Republic of Ireland) Paul McGrath	40	3	4	0	4	1	5	0	53	4
DF	(Denmark) John Sivebæk	2(1)	0	0	0	0	0	0	0	2(1)	0
MF	(England) Mark Dempsey	1	0	0	0	0	0	1(1)	0	2(1)	0
MF	(England) Colin Gibson	18	5	4	0	0	0	2	1	24	6
MF	(Republic of Ireland) Kevin Moran	18(1)	0	3	0	4	0	1	0	26(1)	0
MF	(England) Remi Moses	4	0	0	0	0	0	0(1)	0	4(1)	0
MF	(Denmark) Jesper Olsen	25(3)	11	3(2)	2	3	0	3	0	34(5)	13
MF	(England) Bryan Robson	21	7	3	0	2	0	2	1	28	8
MF	(Scotland) Gordon Strachan	27(1)	5	5	0	1	0	3(1)	0	36(2)	5
MF	(Northern Ireland) Norman Whiteside	37	4	5	1	4	2	5	1	51	8
FW	(England) Peter Barnes	12(1)	2	0	0	3	1	2	0	17(1)	3
FW	(Scotland) Alan Brazil	1(10)	3	0	0	2(2)	0	3	0	6(12)	3
FW	(England) Peter Davenport	11	1	0	0	0	0	0	0	11	1
FW	(England) Terry Gibson	2(5)	0	0	0	0	0	0	0	2(5)	0
FW	(Wales) Mark Hughes	40	17	3	1	2	0	4	0	49	18
FW	(Republic of Ireland) Frank Stapleton	34(7)	7	5	2	4	0	4	1	47(7)	10
FW	(England) Nicky Wood	0(1)	0	0	0	0	0	0	0	0(1)	0
