= 1986–87 Manchester United F.C. season =

English football club season

Manchester United
1986–87 season
- Chairman: Martin Edwards
- Manager: Ron Atkinson (until 4 November); Alex Ferguson (from 6 November)
- First Division: 11th
- FA Cup: Fourth round
- League Cup: Third round
- Top goalscorer: League: Peter Davenport (14); All: Peter Davenport (16)
- Highest home attendance: 54,294 vs Manchester City (10 January 1987)
- Lowest home attendance: 18,906 vs Port Vale (24 September 1986)
- Average home league attendance: 40,626
Home colours	Away colours	Third colours

The 1986–87 season was Manchester United's 85th season in the Football League, and their 12th consecutive season in the top division of English football.

The pressure on manager Ron Atkinson after last season's failed title challenge remained strong after United lost their opening three games of the season, and despite some decent results in the following few weeks, United bowed out of the League Cup in a fourth round replay defeat at Southampton, prompting the dismissal of Atkinson on 4 November 1986 after more than five years in charge.

Alex Ferguson was confirmed as Atkinson's successor within hours, recruited from Scottish side Aberdeen, where he had enjoyed considerable success in the previous seven years. United recovered well in the league after his appointment and finished 11th, managing to scratch up some impressive results including winning both of their league clashes with Liverpool (results which helped deprive Kenny Dalglish's side of the league title), a 4–1 home win over Newcastle United on New Year's Day 1987, a 2–0 home win over a resurgent Arsenal and a 2–0 win at Old Trafford in the Manchester derby which helped push City towards relegation.

However, United were prevented from finishing even higher in the league by a few disappointing results after Ferguson's arrival, beginning with a 2–0 defeat in their first game under Ferguson at Oxford United, losing both of their clashes with newly promoted Wimbledon, being beaten at Old Trafford by Norwich City just after Christmas and suffering a 4–0 defeat at Tottenham near the end of the season, although by the time of the Tottenham game it was mathematically impossible for United to either win the title or suffer relegation (there was no prospect of European qualification due to the ongoing ban on English clubs in Europe following the Heysel disaster two years earlier). United also failed to win any other away games in the league apart from the visit to Liverpool on Boxing Day.

United's improvement under Ferguson during the season was achieved without making any major signings, although it was widely expected that he would spend heavily on new players during the 1987 close season. He went on to pay Celtic £850,000 for high-scoring striker Brian McClair. He strengthened the defence by paying Arsenal £250,000 for experienced full-back Viv Anderson. Unsuccessful bids were also made for several other players: Ferguson expressed an interest in bringing striker Mark Hateley back to England from Milan, but the player opted to remain overseas and signed for AS Monaco instead. He also made a bid to bring Peter Beardsley back to the club from Newcastle United, but the England international forward instead joined Liverpool for a British record fee. Ferguson was offered the chance to sign Watford winger John Barnes, but declined to make an approach for the player due to his faith in Jesper Olsen in the same position.

== Pre-season and friendlies ==
Date	Opponents	H / A	Result F–A	Scorers	Attendance
6 August 1986	Fluminense	H	0–0 (4–3p)		32,275
8 August 1986	Dynamo Kyiv	N	1–1 (1–4p)	Blackmore	27,500
10 August 1986	Ajax	A	0–1		23,000
14 August 1986	Shamrock Rovers	A	0–2		10,200
17 August 1986	Real Sociedad	H	1–1	Blackmore	12,826
2 September 1986	Hearts	A	2–2	Olsen (pen.), T. Gibson	10,438
10 September 1986	Linfield	A	3–0	Robson (2), Davenport	10,919
15 December 1986	GCC All-Stars	N	1–0	Whiteside	4,000
21 January 1987	Red Star Belgrade	H	0–1		10,652
24 February 1987	Swansea City	A	3–1	T. Gibson, Whiteside, Davenport	6,467
18 March 1987	Shamrock Rovers	A	1–2	Robson	8,000
25 March 1987	Celtic	A	0–1		36,000
10 May 1987	England XI	H	7–2	Hughes (4; 1 pen.), Martin, Gibson, Bond (o.g.)	16,907
16 May 1987	Naxxar Lions	N	9–0	Whiteside (3), O'Brien (2), Blackmore, Davenport (pen.), Duxbury, Stapleton	4,000

== First Division ==
Date	Opponents	H / A	Result F–A	Scorers	Attendance	League position
23 August 1986	Arsenal	A	0–1		41,382	15th
25 August 1986	West Ham United	H	2–3	Stapleton 40', Davenport 46'	43,306	18th
30 August 1986	Charlton Athletic	H	0–1		37,544	21st
6 September 1986	Leicester City	A	1–1	Whiteside 52'	16,785	22nd
13 September 1986	Southampton	H	5–1	Olsen 22' (pen.), Davenport 25', Stapleton (2) 36', 83', Whiteside 53'	40,135	19th
16 September 1986	Watford	A	0–1		21,650	19th
21 September 1986	Everton	A	1–3	Robson 12'	25,843	21st
28 September 1986	Chelsea	H	0–1		33,340	21st
4 October 1986	Nottingham Forest	A	1–1	Robson 73'	34,828	21st
11 October 1986	Sheffield Wednesday	H	3–1	Davenport (2) 35' (pen.), 85', Whiteside 83'	45,890	20th
18 October 1986	Luton Town	H	1–0	Stapleton 9'	39,927	19th
25 October 1986	Manchester City	A	1–1	Stapleton 47'	32,440	20th
1 November 1986	Coventry City	H	1–1	Davenport 31'	36,946	19th
8 November 1986	Oxford United	A	0–2		13,545	20th
15 November 1986	Norwich City	A	0–0		22,684	21st
22 November 1986	Queens Park Rangers	H	1–0	Sivebæk 32'	42,235	17th
29 November 1986	Wimbledon	A	0–1		12,112	17th
7 December 1986	Tottenham Hotspur	H	3–3	Whiteside 11', Davenport (2) 36', 88' (pen.)	35,957	16th
13 December 1986	Aston Villa	A	3–3	Davenport (2) 18', 55', Whiteside 54'	29,205	17th
20 December 1986	Leicester City	H	2–0	C. Gibson 11', Stapleton 67'	34,150	15th
26 December 1986	Liverpool	A	1–0	Whiteside 78'	40,663	14th
27 December 1986	Norwich City	H	0–1		44,610	15th
1 January 1987	Newcastle United	H	4–1	P. Jackson 4' (o.g.), Whiteside 9', Stapleton 56', Olsen 90'	43,334	14th
3 January 1987	Southampton	A	1–1	Olsen 11'	20,409	13th
24 January 1987	Arsenal	H	2–0	Strachan 55', T. Gibson 90'	51,367	13th
7 February 1987	Charlton Athletic	A	0–0		15,482	13th
14 February 1987	Watford	H	3–1	McGrath 26', Davenport 48' (pen.), Strachan 65'	35,763	11th
21 February 1987	Chelsea	A	1–1	Davenport 61' (pen.)	26,516	12th
28 February 1987	Everton	H	0–0		47,421	12th
7 March 1987	Manchester City	H	2–0	Reid 62' (o.g.), Robson 85'	48,619	10th
14 March 1987	Luton Town	A	1–2	Robson 88'	12,509	13th
21 March 1987	Sheffield Wednesday	A	0–1		29,888	13th
28 March 1987	Nottingham Forest	H	2–0	McGrath 12', Robson 44'	39,182	12th
4 April 1987	Oxford United	H	3–2	Davenport (2) 25', 35', Robson 90'	32,443	11th
14 April 1987	West Ham United	A	0–0		23,486	11th
18 April 1987	Newcastle United	A	1–2	Strachan 41'	32,706	12th
20 April 1987	Liverpool	H	1–0	Davenport 88'	54,103	11th
25 April 1987	Queens Park Rangers	A	1–1	Strachan 49'	17,414	11th
2 May 1987	Wimbledon	H	0–1		31,686	11th
4 May 1987	Tottenham Hotspur	A	0–4		36,692	11th
6 May 1987	Coventry City	A	1–1	Whiteside 25'	23,407	11th
9 May 1987	Aston Villa	H	3–1	Blackmore 55', Duxbury 63', Robson 65'	35,179	11th

Pos	Team	Pld	W	D	L	GF	GA	GD	Pts	Qualification or relegation
9	Watford	42	18	9	15	67	54	+13	63	
10	Coventry City (Note: Coventry City would have qualified as FA Cup winners.)	42	17	12	13	50	45	+5	63	Disqualified from the European Cup Winners' Cup
11	Manchester United	42	14	14	14	52	45	+7	56	
12	Southampton	42	14	10	18	69	68	+1	52	
13	Sheffield Wednesday	42	13	13	16	58	59	−1	52	

Source: World Football
Rules for classification: 1) Points; 2) Goal difference; 3) Goals scored

== FA Cup ==
Date	Round	Opponents	H / A	Result F–A	Scorers	Attendance
10 January 1987	Round 3	Manchester City	H	1–0	Whiteside 66'	54,294
31 January 1987	Round 4	Coventry City	H	0–1		49,082

== League Cup ==
Date	Round	Opponents	H / A	Result F–A	Scorers	Attendance
24 September 1986	Round 2 First leg	Port Vale	H	2–0	Stapleton 51', Whiteside 81'	18,906
7 October 1986	Round 2 Second leg	Port Vale	A	5–2	Stapleton 34', Barnes 71', Moses (2) 75', 89', Davenport 77' (pen.)	10,486
29 October 1986	Round 3	Southampton	H	0–0		23,639
4 November 1986	Round 3 Replay	Southampton	A	1–4	Davenport 88'	17,915

== Events of the season ==
During the close season, there was speculation that manager Ron Atkinson was about to be sacked and that Aberdeen manager Alex Ferguson was going to be appointed in his place. Atkinson tried to fight back and prove the critics wrong. He attempted to sign the England defender Terry Butcher from Ipswich Town, but lost out to Rangers (who were managed by the former Liverpool midfielder Graeme Souness).

On 8 August, dozens of Manchester United and West Ham United fans were arrested following clashes on a Sealink ferry bound for the Netherlands. This sparked fears that English clubs could even be banned from contesting friendlies with foreign sides, on top of their ban from UEFA matches.

The First Division campaign kicked off on 23 August, with Manchester United losing 1–0 to Arsenal. All of United's first three league games ended in defeat, placing them second from bottom in the First Division with only Aston Villa below them.

Their first league win of the season finally came on 13 September, when they demolished Southampton 5–1 at Old Trafford, which lifted them to 19th of 22, in a division in which they had not finished lower than fourth in any of the five previous campaigns.

A dismal league game at Old Trafford on 28 September saw United lose 1–0 at home to Chelsea, and more frustratingly United missed both of the two penalties they were awarded in the game; the first from Jesper Olsen, the second from Gordon Strachan.

In late October, experienced defender John Gidman joined neighbours Manchester City on a free transfer, but there was no talk of new additions to a hard pressed squad. There were also fears that Gary Bailey, still only 28 but out of action for nearly a year due to a knee injury, could retire from football in the near future if he failed to make a good recovery from the injury.

On 1 November, Manchester United completed a six-match unbeaten run in the league (their last defeat being against Chelsea on 28 September) by drawing 1–1 with Coventry City, but they were still fourth from bottom and speculation over Atkinson's future as manager continued to mount.

Atkinson was finally dismissed on 5 November, the day after his team were beaten 4–1 by Southampton in a Football League Cup third round replay. It was their first defeat in a competitive game since 28 September, and their heaviest in a competitive game for 18 months. Within 24 hours, Alex Ferguson agreed to take over as Manchester United's new manager on a four-year contract. His first game in charge took place three days later, when Manchester United's six-match unbeaten run in the league came to an end with a 2–0 defeat to Oxford United. His first win at the helm came on 22 November when they beat Queen's Park Rangers 1–0 in the league at Old Trafford.

Their good progress continued in December as they gained their first away league win of the season with a 1–0 win over Liverpool at Anfield. It was the first time that Liverpool lost a home game in the 1986–87 league season. Norman Whiteside scored the only goal of the game for a side who have climbed from 21st to 14th in the league since Ferguson's appointment.

There was a setback two days later, however, when captain Bryan Robson suffered a hamstring injury in Manchester United's 1–0 home defeat by Norwich City in the league.

The quest for the FA Cup began on 10 January at Old Trafford, in a Manchester derby which United won 1–0, the only goal of the game scored by Norman Whiteside.

Four days after the FA Cup win, winger Peter Barnes became the second Manchester United player to join Manchester City that season, moving to Maine Road in a £20,000 deal.

The club's name was tarnished again on 20 January when 26 suspected football hooligans (some of them Manchester United supporters) were arrested in police raids across England.

Manchester United blew their final chance of silverware this season by losing 1–0 at home to Coventry City in the FA Cup fourth round at the end of January.

The 110th Manchester derby (a league clash at Old Trafford on 7 March) saw Manchester United win 2–0, taking them to 10th place, while Manchester City sink into 19th place (the relegation playoff place).

Later that month, Alex Ferguson expressed interest in bringing Mark Hughes back to Old Trafford after a spell in Spain that had so far been disappointing.

Plans were unveiled around this time for Old Trafford to be expanded into a world class modern stadium which to resemble Barcelona's Nou Camp.

In April, chairman Martin Edwards announced plans to introduce a ground-breaking new membership scheme to combat football hooliganism.

April also saw Manchester United complete a double over Liverpool in the North West derby with a 1–0 win at Old Trafford, counting against the red half of Merseyside's title hopes as the title was heading for Everton.

Gary Bailey finally announced his retirement from playing on 23 April 1987, having failed to make a full recovery from the knee injury he had suffered 17 months earlier.

Manchester United's season ended with a 3–1 home win over relegated Aston Villa, which secured them an 11th-place finish in the First Division - their lowest since relegation from the top flight 13 years ago.

Goalkeeper Chris Turner and defender Graeme Hogg were put on the transfer list at the end of the season.

Bids were made for the Celtic and Scotland striker Brian McClair as well as the AC Milan and England striker Mark Hateley. A potential record breaking bid was made for the Newcastle United and England striker Peter Beardsley, who had a brief and unsuccessful spell at Old Trafford five years earlier.

A less significant signing was made by Ferguson when he pays £250,000 for Arsenal defender Viv Anderson. Striker Frank Stapleton was on his way out of the Old Trafford exit door that summer, moving to Ajax of the Netherlands in a £100,000 deal.

Brian McClair finally agreed to sign for Manchester United in a deal which a tribunal set at £850,000, while Beardsley joined Liverpool for a national record fee of £1.9 million and Hateley remained on the continent in a transfer to AS Monaco.

United also made an approach for Norwich City striker Kevin Drinkell, but the player rejected Alex Ferguson's terms and decided to remain at Carrow Road instead.

== Squad statistics ==
Pos.	Name	League		FA Cup		Littlewoods Cup		Total	
Pos.	Name	Apps	Goals	Apps	Goals	Apps	Goals	Apps	Goals
GK	(England) Gary Bailey	5	0	0	0	0	0	5	0
GK	(England) Chris Turner	23	0	2	0	4	0	29	0
GK	(England) Gary Walsh	14	0	0	0	0	0	14	0
DF	(Scotland) Arthur Albiston	19(3)	0	0	0	4	0	23(3)	0
DF	(Wales) Clayton Blackmore	10(2)	1	1	0	0	0	11(2)	1
DF	(England) Mike Duxbury	32	1	2	0	3	0	37	1
DF	(England) Billy Garton	9	0	2	0	0	0	11	0
DF	(England) Colin Gibson	24	1	1	0	1	0	26	1
DF	(Scotland) Graeme Hogg	11	0	0	0	2	0	13	0
DF	(Republic of Ireland) Paul McGrath	34(1)	2	0(1)	0	4	0	38(2)	2
DF	(Republic of Ireland) Kevin Moran	32(1)	0	2	0	2(1)	0	36(2)	0
DF	(Denmark) John Sivebæk	27(1)	1	2	0	1	0	30(1)	1
MF	(England) Peter Barnes	7	0	0	0	2	1	9	1
MF	(England) Tony Gill	1	0	0	0	0	0	1	0
MF	(England) Remi Moses	17(1)	0	0	0	4	2	21(1)	2
MF	(Republic of Ireland) Liam O'Brien	9(2)	0	0	0	0	0	9(2)	0
MF	(Denmark) Jesper Olsen	22(6)	3	2	0	1(1)	0	25(7)	3
MF	(England) Bryan Robson	29(1)	7	0	0	3	0	32(1)	7
MF	(Scotland) Gordon Strachan	33(1)	4	2	0	2	0	37(1)	4
FW	(England) Peter Davenport	34(5)	14	1(1)	0	4	2	39(6)	16
FW	(England) Terry Gibson	12(4)	1	1(1)	0	0(2)	0	13(7)	1
FW	(Republic of Ireland) Frank Stapleton	25(9)	7	2	0	4	2	31(9)	9
FW	(Northern Ireland) Norman Whiteside	31	8	2	1	3(1)	1	36(1)	10
FW	(England) Nicky Wood	2	0	0	0	0(1)	0	2(1)	0
