= 1983–84 Manchester United F.C. season =

English football club season

Manchester United
1983–84 season
- Chairman: Martin Edwards
- Manager: Ron Atkinson
- First Division: 4th
- FA Cup: Third round
- League Cup: Fourth round
- Cup Winners' Cup: Semi-finals
- Charity Shield: Winners
- Top goalscorer: League: Frank Stapleton (13); All: Frank Stapleton (19)
- Highest home attendance: 58,547 vs Barcelona (21 March 1984)
- Lowest home attendance: 23,589 vs Port Vale (26 October 1983)
- Average home league attendance: 42,215
Home colours	Away colours

The 1983–84 season was Manchester United's 82nd season in the Football League, and their 9th consecutive season in the top division of English football. As FA Cup holders they suffered a shock exit at the hands of Third Division underdogs Bournemouth in the third round, but did reach the semi-finals of the European Cup Winners' Cup and were narrowly defeated by Juventus. They frequently led the league during the season but eventually finish fourth, having been held to a draw in 14 out of 42 games despite losing just eight times. Perhaps the most memorable game of the season was the European Cup Winners' Cup quarter-final clash with Barcelona of Spain, a side featuring Diego Maradona. After going 2–0 down in the first leg, United achieved a remarkable 3–0 win in the return leg at Old Trafford.

It was the breakthrough season at the club for young striker Mark Hughes, who scored four times late in the season, and the final season at the club for midfielder Ray Wilkins who exited Old Trafford at the end of the campaign to sign for Milan. Captain Bryan Robson stayed at the club despite an attempt to sign him by Italian side Juventus.

The close season saw the arrival of wingers Gordon Strachan and Jesper Olsen and the departure of Lou Macari to Swindon Town.

== Pre-season ==
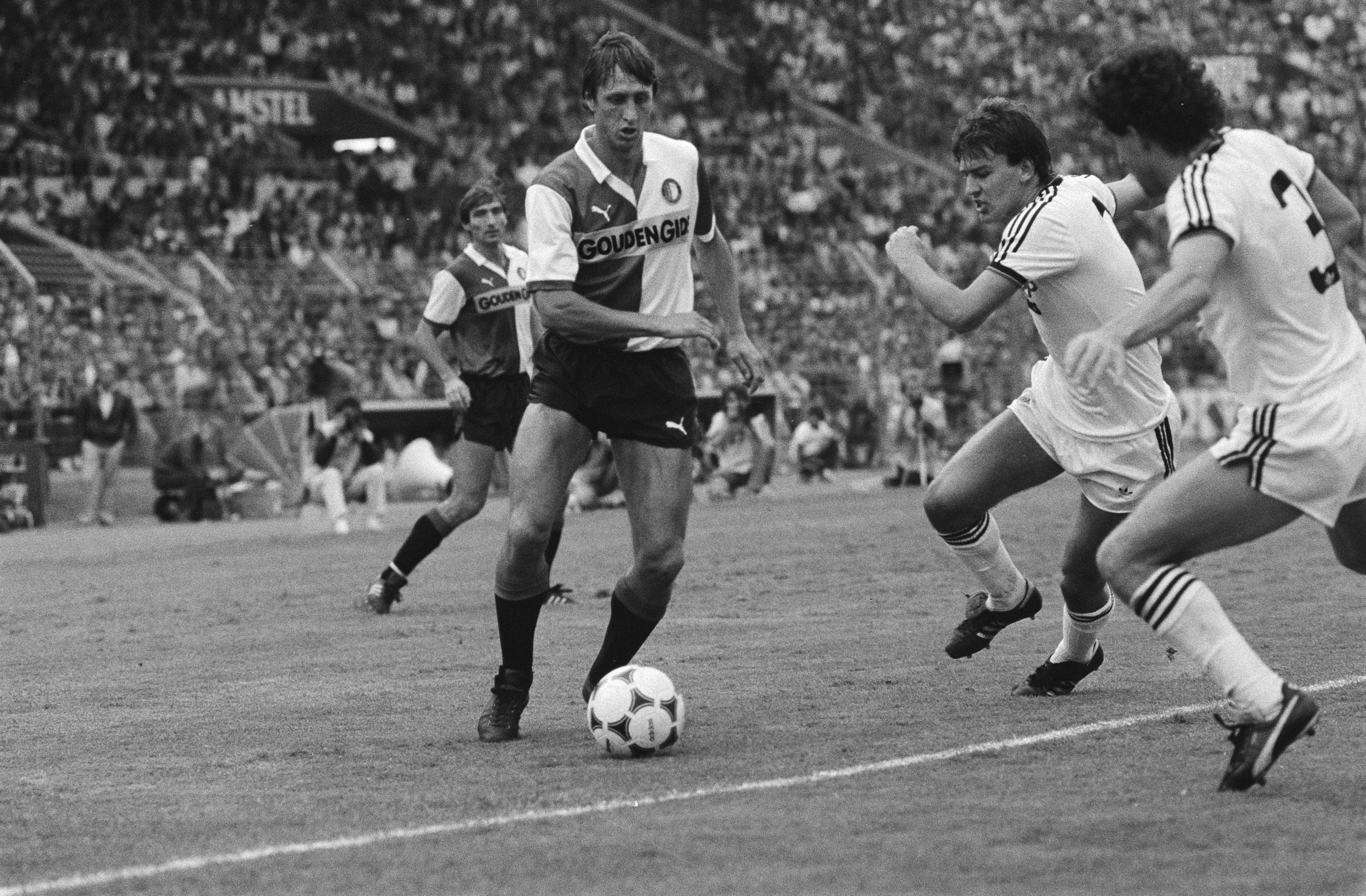
Action from the preseason game against Feyenoord; Johan Cruyff at centre.

United competed in the 1983 Amsterdam Tournament.

Date	Round	Opponents	H / A	Result F–A	Scorers	Attendance
12 August 1983	Semi-final	Feyenoord	N	1–2	Stapleton 44'	
14 August 1983	Third-place playoff	Ajax	A	0–1		

== FA Charity Shield ==
Date	Opponents	H / A	Result F–A	Scorers	Attendance
20 August 1983	Liverpool	N	2–0	Robson (2)	92,000

== First Division ==
Date	Opponents	H / A	Result F–A	Scorers	Attendance
27 August 1983	Queens Park Rangers	H	3–1	Mühren (2), Stapleton	48,742
29 August 1983	Nottingham Forest	H	1–2	Moran	43,005
3 September 1983	Stoke City	A	1–0	Mühren	23,704
6 September 1983	Arsenal	A	3–2	Moran, Robson, Stapleton	42,703
10 September 1983	Luton Town	H	2–0	Albiston, Mühren	41,013
17 September 1983	Southampton	A	0–3		20,674
24 September 1983	Liverpool	H	1–0	Stapleton	56,121
1 October 1983	Norwich City	A	3–3	Whiteside (2), Stapleton	19,290
15 October 1983	West Bromwich Albion	H	3–0	Albiston, Graham, Whiteside	42,221
22 October 1983	Sunderland	A	1–0	Wilkins	26,826
29 October 1983	Wolverhampton Wanderers	H	3–0	Stapleton (2), Robson	41,880
5 November 1983	Aston Villa	H	1–2	Robson	45,077
12 November 1983	Leicester City	A	1–1	Robson	24,409
19 November 1983	Watford	H	4–1	Stapleton (3), Robson	43,111
27 November 1983	West Ham United	A	1–1	Wilkins	23,355
3 December 1983	Everton	H	0–1		43,664
10 December 1983	Ipswich Town	A	2–0	Crooks, Graham	19,779
16 December 1983	Tottenham Hotspur	H	4–2	Graham (2), Moran (2)	33,616
26 December 1983	Coventry City	A	1–1	Mühren	21,553
27 December 1983	Notts County	H	3–3	Crooks, McQueen, Moran	41,544
31 December 1983	Stoke City	H	1–0	Graham	40,164
2 January 1984	Liverpool	A	1–1	Whiteside	44,622
13 January 1984	Queens Park Rangers	A	1–1	Robson	16,308
21 January 1984	Southampton	H	3–2	Mühren, Robson, Stapleton	40,371
4 February 1984	Norwich City	H	0–0		36,851
7 February 1984	Birmingham City	A	2–2	Hogg, Whiteside	19,957
12 February 1984	Luton Town	A	5–0	Robson (2), Whiteside (2), Stapleton	11,265
18 February 1984	Wolverhampton Wanderers	A	1–1	Whiteside	20,676
25 February 1984	Sunderland	H	2–1	Moran (2)	40,615
3 March 1984	Aston Villa	A	3–0	Moses, Robson, Whiteside	32,874
10 March 1984	Leicester City	H	2–0	Hughes, Moses	39,473
17 March 1984	Arsenal	H	4–0	Mühren (2), Robson, Stapleton	48,942
31 March 1984	West Bromwich Albion	A	0–2		28,104
7 April 1984	Birmingham City	H	1–0	Robson	39,896
14 April 1984	Notts County	A	0–1		13,911
17 April 1984	Watford	A	0–0		20,764
21 April 1984	Coventry City	H	4–1	Hughes (2), McGrath, Wilkins	38,524
28 April 1984	West Ham United	H	0–0		44,124
5 May 1984	Everton	A	1–1	Stapleton	28,802
7 May 1984	Ipswich Town	H	1–2	Hughes	44,257
12 May 1984	Tottenham Hotspur	A	1–1	Whiteside	39,790
16 May 1984	Nottingham Forest	A	0–2		23,651

Pos	Team	Pld	W	D	L	GF	GA	GD	Pts	Qualification or relegation
2	Southampton	42	22	11	9	66	38	+28	77	Qualification for the UEFA Cup first round
3	Nottingham Forest	42	22	8	12	76	45	+31	74	Qualification for the UEFA Cup first round
4	Manchester United	42	20	14	8	71	41	+30	74	Qualification for the UEFA Cup first round
5	Queens Park Rangers	42	22	7	13	67	37	+30	73	Qualification for the UEFA Cup first round
6	Arsenal	42	18	9	15	74	60	+14	63	

Source: World Football
Rules for classification: 1) Points; 2) Goal difference; 3) Goals scored

== FA Cup ==
Date	Round	Opponents	H / A	Result F–A	Scorers	Attendance
7 January 1984	Round 3	Bournemouth	A	0–2		14,782

== League Cup ==
Date	Round	Opponents	H / A	Result F–A	Scorers	Attendance
3 October 1983	Round 2 First leg	Port Vale	A	1–0	Stapleton	19,885
26 October 1983	Round 2 Second leg	Port Vale	H	2–0	Whiteside, Wilkins	23,589
8 November 1983	Round 3	Colchester United	A	2–0	McQueen, Moses	13,031
30 November 1983	Round 4	Oxford United	A	1–1	Hughes	13,739
7 December 1983	Round 4 Replay	Oxford United	H	1–1	Stapleton	27,459
19 December 1983	Round 4; 2nd Replay	Oxford United	A	1–2	Graham	13,912

== Cup Winners' Cup ==
Date	Round	Opponents	H / A	Result F–A	Scorers	Attendance
14 September 1983	Round 1 First leg	Dukla Prague	H	1–1	Wilkins	39,745
27 September 1983	Round 1 Second leg	Dukla Prague	A	2–2	Robson, Stapleton	28,850
19 October 1983	Round 2 First leg	Spartak Varna	A	2–1	Graham, Robson	40,000
2 November 1983	Round 2 Second leg	Spartak Varna	H	2–0	Stapleton (2)	39,079
7 March 1984	Round 3 First leg	Barcelona	A	0–2		70,000
21 March 1984	Round 3 Second leg	Barcelona	H	3–0	Robson (2), Stapleton	58,547
11 April 1984	Semi-final; First leg	Juventus	H	1–1	Davies	58,171
25 April 1984	Semi-final; Second leg	Juventus	A	1–2	Whiteside	64,655

== Squad statistics ==
Pos.	Name	League		FA Cup		League Cup		UEFA Cup		Other		Total	
Pos.	Name	Apps	Goals	Apps	Goals	Apps	Goals	Apps	Goals	Apps	Goals	Apps	Goals
GK	(England) Gary Bailey	40	0	1	0	5	0	8	0	1	0	55	0
GK	(England) Jeff Wealands	2	0	0	0	1	0	0	0	0	0	3	0
DF	(Scotland) Arthur Albiston	40	2	1	0	6	0	8	0	1	0	56	2
DF	(Wales) Clayton Blackmore	1	0	0	0	0	0	0	0	0	0	1	0
DF	(England) Mike Duxbury	39	0	1	0	6	0	8	0	1	0	55	0
DF	(England) John Gidman	4	0	0	0	1	0	1(1)	0	0(1)	0	6(2)	0
DF	(Scotland) Graeme Hogg	16	1	1	0	0	0	4	0	0	0	21	1
DF	(Republic of Ireland) Paul McGrath	9	1	0	0	1	0	2	0	0	0	12	1
DF	(Scotland) Gordon McQueen	20	1	0	0	4	1	4	0	1	0	29	2
DF	(Republic of Ireland) Kevin Moran	38	7	0	0	5	0	8	0	1	0	52	7
MF	(Wales) Alan Davies	3	0	0	0	0	0	0(1)	1	0	0	3(1)	1
MF	(England) Mark Dempsey	0	0	0	0	0	0	0(1)	0	0	0	0(1)	0
MF	(Scotland) Arthur Graham	33(4)	5	1	0	5	1	6(1)	1	1	0	46(5)	7
MF	(Scotland) Lou Macari	0(5)	0	0(1)	0	0(2)	0	2	0	0	0	2(8)	0
MF	(England) Remi Moses	31(4)	2	1	0	5(1)	1	5(1)	0	0	0	42(6)	3
MF	(Netherlands) Arnold Mühren	26	8	1	0	2	0	5	0	1	0	35	8
MF	(England) Bryan Robson	33	12	1	0	6	0	6	4	1	2	47	18
MF	(England) Ray Wilkins	42	3	1	0	6	1	6	1	1	0	56	5
FW	(England) Garth Crooks	6(1)	2	0	0	0	0	0	0	0	0	6(1)	2
FW	(Wales) Mark Hughes	7(4)	4	0	0	1(1)	1	2(2)	0	0	0	10(7)	5
FW	(Republic of Ireland) Frank Stapleton	42	13	1	0	6	2	8	4	1	0	58	19
FW	(Northern Ireland) Norman Whiteside	30(7)	10	1	0	6	1	5(1)	1	1	0	43(8)	12
