= 1985 FA Charity Shield =

- The match programme cover
Everton	Manchester United
2	0
- Date: 10 August 1985
- Venue: Wembley Stadium, London
- Referee: Joe Worrall (Cheshire)
- Attendance: 82,000

The 1985 FA Charity Shield (also known as the General Motors FA Charity Shield for sponsorship reasons) was the 63rd FA Charity Shield, an annual football match played between the winners of the previous season's First Division and FA Cup competitions. The match was played on 10 August 1985 at Wembley Stadium and contested by Everton, who had won the 1984–85 First Division, and Manchester United, who had won the 1984–85 FA Cup. Everton won 2–0 with goals from Trevor Steven and Adrian Heath. Trevor Steven put Everton into the lead when he swept home from six yards after a cross from the left in the first half. The second goal came in the second half when Manchester United goalkeeper Gary Bailey dropped a cross from the left to allow Adrian Heath to tip the ball past him into the left corner of the net.

The Charity Shield was the first competitive game that new striker Gary Lineker played for Everton, and although he failed to get on the scoresheet in the game, he made up for it by scoring 40 goals in all competitions that season. He took the place in the team previously occupied by Andy Gray. Kevin Moran of Manchester United had been sent off in the final and he was suspended for this game, with his place in the side being taken by understudy Graeme Hogg, and Gordon Strachan was replaced by Mike Duxbury. These were the only differences between the first XI of this game and the FA Cup final earlier in May 1985.

== Match details ==
10 August 1985
15:00 UTC+1

Everton	2–0	Manchester United
Steven 28; Heath 82	Report

Wembley Stadium, London
Attendance: 82,000
Referee: Joe Worrall (Cheshire)

Everton	Manchester United

GK	1	(Wales) Neville Southall
DF	2	(England) Gary Stevens
DF	4	(Wales) Kevin Ratcliffe (c)
DF	5	(England) Derek Mountfield
DF	3	(Wales) Pat Van Den Hauwe	Substituted off
MF	7	(England) Trevor Steven
MF	10	(England) Paul Bracewell
MF	6	(England) Peter Reid
MF	11	(Republic of Ireland) Kevin Sheedy
FW	9	(Scotland) Graeme Sharp
FW	8	(England) Gary Lineker	Substituted off
Substitutes:
DF	12	(England) Alan Harper
DF	13	(England) John Bailey	Substituted on
MF	15	(England) Adrian Heath	Substituted on
Manager:
(England) Howard Kendall

GK	1	(England) Gary Bailey
DF	2	(England) John Gidman
DF	3	(Scotland) Arthur Albiston
MF	4	(Northern Ireland) Norman Whiteside
DF	5	(Republic of Ireland) Paul McGrath
DF	6	(Scotland) Graeme Hogg
MF	7	(England) Bryan Robson (c)
MF	8	(England) Mike Duxbury	(substituted off) 61'
FW	9	(Wales) Mark Hughes
FW	10	(Republic of Ireland) Frank Stapleton
MF	11	(Denmark) Jesper Olsen
Substitutes:
FW	12	(Scotland) Alan Brazil
GK	13	(England) Chris Turner
MF	14	(England) Remi Moses	(substituted on) 61'
MF	15	(England) Peter Barnes
DF	16	(Wales) Clayton Blackmore
Manager:
(England) Ron Atkinson

Match rules

- 90 minutes, no extra time
- Five named substitutes
- Maximum of three substitutions

== See also ==
- 1984–85 Football League
- 1984–85 FA Cup
