= 1982–83 Manchester United F.C. season =

English football club season

Manchester United
1982–83 season
- Chairman: Martin Edwards
- Manager: Ron Atkinson
- First Division: 3rd
- FA Cup: Winners
- League Cup: Runners-up
- UEFA Cup: First Round
- Top goalscorer: League: Frank Stapleton (14); All: Frank Stapleton (19)
- Highest home attendance: 58,198 vs Everton (12 March 1983)
- Lowest home attendance: 22,091 vs Bournemouth (6 October 1982)
- Average home league attendance: 41,295
Home colours	Away colours	Third colours

The 1982–83 season was Manchester United's 81st season in the Football League, and their 8th consecutive season in the top division of English football. It was also the very first season in which they had a shirt sponsor, in this case, Sharp Corporation. They finished the season third in the league and won the FA Cup for the fifth time in their history, beating relegated Brighton 4–0 in the replay after drawing the first game 2–2. It was the breakthrough season for teenage striker Norman Whiteside, who was a regular first team player and scored 14 goals in all competitions, including one in the FA Cup final replay.

Atkinson had also added Dutch winger Arnold Muhren to the club's ranks on a free transfer from Ipswich Town before the start of the season, and the new signing was a success, establishing himself as United's regular left winger and scoring a penalty in the FA Cup final replay.

It was also a good second season at United for Frank Stapleton, who was the club's top scorer with 14 goals in the league and 19 in all competitions.

United reached their first League Cup final, but lost 2-1 to Liverpool.

== First Division ==
Date	Opponents	H / A	Result F–A	Scorers	Attendance
28 August 1982	Birmingham City	H	3–0	Coppell, Moran, Stapleton	48,673
1 September 1982	Nottingham Forest	A	3–0	Wilkins, Whiteside, Robson	23,956
4 September 1982	West Bromwich Albion	A	1–3	Robson	24,928
8 September 1982	Everton	H	2–1	Robson, Whiteside	43,186
11 September 1982	Ipswich Town	H	3–1	Whiteside (2), Coppell	43,140
18 September 1982	Southampton	A	1–0	Macari	21,700
25 September 1982	Arsenal	H	0–0		43,198
2 October 1982	Luton Town	A	1–1	Grimes	17,009
9 October 1982	Stoke City	H	1–0	Robson	43,132
16 October 1982	Liverpool	A	0–0		40,853
23 October 1982	Manchester City	H	2–2	Stapleton (2)	57,334
30 October 1982	West Ham United	A	1–3	Moran	31,684
6 November 1982	Brighton & Hove Albion	A	0–1		18,379
13 November 1982	Tottenham Hotspur	H	1–0	Mühren	47,869
20 November 1982	Aston Villa	A	1–2	Stapleton	35,487
27 November 1982	Norwich City	H	3–0	Robson (2), Mühren	34,579
4 December 1982	Watford	A	1–0	Whiteside	25,669
11 December 1982	Notts County	H	4–0	Whiteside, Stapleton, Robson, Duxbury	33,618
18 December 1982	Swansea City	A	0–0		15,748
27 December 1982	Sunderland	H	0–0		47,783
28 December 1982	Coventry City	A	0–3		18,945
1 January 1983	Aston Villa	H	3–1	Stapleton (2), Coppell	41,545
3 January 1983	West Bromwich Albion	H	0–0		39,123
15 January 1983	Birmingham City	A	2–1	Whiteside, Robson	19,333
22 January 1983	Nottingham Forest	H	2–0	Coppell (pen.), Mühren	38,615
5 February 1983	Ipswich Town	A	1–1	Stapleton	23,804
26 February 1983	Liverpool	H	1–1	Mühren	57,397
2 March 1983	Stoke City	A	0–1		21,266
5 March 1983	Manchester City	A	2–1	Stapleton (2)	45,400
19 March 1983	Brighton & Hove Albion	H	1–1	Albiston	36,264
22 March 1983	West Ham United	H	2–1	McGarvey, Stapleton	30,227
2 April 1983	Coventry City	H	3–0	Stapleton, Gillespie (o.g.), Macari	36,814
4 April 1983	Sunderland	A	0–0		31,486
9 April 1983	Southampton	H	1–1	Robson	37,120
19 April 1983	Everton	A	0–2		21,715
23 April 1983	Watford	H	2–0	Cunningham, Grimes (pen.)	43,048
30 April 1983	Norwich City	A	1–1	Whiteside	22,233
2 May 1983	Arsenal	A	0–3		23,602
7 May 1983	Swansea City	H	2–1	Robson, Stapleton	35,724
9 May 1983	Luton Town	H	3–0	McGrath (2), Stapleton	34,213
11 May 1983	Tottenham Hotspur	A	0–2		32,803
14 May 1983	Notts County	A	2–3	McGrath, Mühren	14,395

Pos	Team	Pld	W	D	L	GF	GA	GD	Pts	Qualification or relegation
1	Liverpool (C)	42	24	10	8	87	37	+50	82	Qualification for the European Cup first round
2	Watford	42	22	5	15	74	57	+17	71	Qualification for the UEFA Cup first round
3	Manchester United	42	19	13	10	56	38	+18	70	Qualification for the Cup Winners' Cup first round (Note: Manchester United qualified for the European Cup Winners' Cup first round as the 1982–83 FA Cup winners.)
4	Tottenham Hotspur	42	20	9	13	65	50	+15	69	Qualification for the UEFA Cup first round
5	Nottingham Forest	42	20	9	13	62	50	+12	69	Qualification for the UEFA Cup first round

Source: World Football
Rules for classification: 1) Points; 2) Goal difference; 3) Goals scored
(C) Champions

== FA Cup ==
Date	Round	Opponents	H / A	Result F–A	Scorers	Attendance
8 January 1983	Round 3	West Ham United	H	2–0	Coppell, Stapleton	44,143
29 January 1983	Round 4	Luton Town	A	2–0	Moran, Moses	20,516
19 February 1983	Round 5	Derby County	A	1–0	Whiteside	33,022
12 March 1983	Round 6	Everton	H	1–0	Stapleton	58,198
16 April 1983	Semi-final	Arsenal	N	2–1	Robson, Whiteside	46,535
21 May 1983	Final	Brighton & Hove Albion	N	2–2	Stapleton, Wilkins	100,000
26 May 1983	Final; Replay	Brighton & Hove Albion	N	4–0	Robson (2), Whiteside, Mühren (pen.)	92,000

== League Cup ==
Date	Round	Opponents	H / A	Result F–A	Scorers	Attendance
6 October 1982	Round 2 First leg	Bournemouth	H	2–0	Redknapp (o.g.), Stapleton	22,091
26 October 1982	Round 2 Second leg	Bournemouth	A	2–2	Coppell (pen.), Mühren	13,226
10 November 1982	Round 3	Bradford City	A	0–0		15,568
24 November 1982	Round 3 Replay	Bradford City	H	4–1	Albiston, Coppell, Moran, Moses	24,507
1 December 1982	Round 4	Southampton	H	2–0	McQueen, Whiteside	28,378
19 January 1983	Round 5	Nottingham Forest	H	4–0	McQueen (2), Coppell, Robson	44,413
15 February 1983	Semi-final; First leg	Arsenal	A	4–2	Whiteside, Stapleton, Coppell (2)	43,136
23 February 1983	Semi-final; Second leg	Arsenal	H	2–1	Coppell, Moran	56,635
26 March 1983	Final	Liverpool	N	1–2	Whiteside	100,000

== UEFA Cup ==
Date	Round	Opponents	H / A	Result F–A	Scorers	Attendance
15 September 1982	Round 1 First leg	Valencia	H	0–0		46,588
29 September 1982	Round 1 Second leg	Valencia	A	1–2	Robson	35,000

== Squad statistics ==
Pos.	Name	League		FA Cup		League Cup		UEFA Cup		Total	
Pos.	Name	Apps	Goals	Apps	Goals	Apps	Goals	Apps	Goals	Apps	Goals
GK	(England) Gary Bailey	37	0	7	0	9	0	2	0	55	0
GK	(England) Jeff Wealands	5	0	0	0	0	0	0	0	5	0
DF	(Scotland) Arthur Albiston	38	1	7	0	9	1	2	0	56	2
DF	(Scotland) Martin Buchan	3	0	0	0	1	0	2	0	6	0
DF	(England) Mike Duxbury	42	1	7	0	9	0	2	0	60	1
DF	(England) John Gidman	3	0	0	0	0	0	0	0	3	0
DF	(Republic of Ireland) Paul McGrath	14	3	0(1)	0	1	0	0	0	15(1)	3
DF	(Scotland) Gordon McQueen	37	0	7	0	8	3	1	0	53	3
DF	(Republic of Ireland) Kevin Moran	29	2	7	1	7	2	1	0	44	5
MF	(England) Steve Coppell	29	4	4	1	8	6	1(1)	0	42(1)	11
MF	(England) Laurie Cunningham	3(2)	1	0	0	0	0	0	0	3(2)	1
MF	(Wales) Alan Davies	2(1)	0	2	0	0	0	0	0	4(1)	0
MF	(Republic of Ireland) Ashley Grimes	15(1)	2	1	0	2	0	2	0	20(1)	2
MF	(England) Remi Moses	29	0	5	1	8	1	1	0	43	2
MF	(Netherlands) Arnold Mühren	32	5	6	1	8	1	0	0	46	7
MF	(England) Bryan Robson	33	10	6	3	8	1	2	1	49	15
MF	(England) Ray Wilkins	26	1	4	1	3(1)	0	2	0	35(1)	2
FW	(England) Peter Beardsley	0	0	0	0	1	0	0	0	1	0
FW	(Scotland) Lou Macari	2(7)	2	0(1)	0	1(2)	0	0(1)	0	3(11)	2
FW	(Scotland) Scott McGarvey	3(4)	1	0	0	0	0	0	0	3(4)	1
FW	(Republic of Ireland) Frank Stapleton	41	14	7	3	9	2	2	0	59	19
FW	(Northern Ireland) Norman Whiteside	39	8	7	3	7(2)	3	2	0	55(2)	14
