= 1987–88 Manchester United F.C. season =

English football club season

Manchester United
1987–88 season
- Chairman: Martin Edwards
- Manager: Alex Ferguson
- First Division: 2nd
- FA Cup: Fifth round
- League Cup: Fifth round
- Top goalscorer: League: Brian McClair (24); All: Brian McClair (31)
- Highest home attendance: 50,716 vs Chelsea (30 January 1988)
- Lowest home attendance: 25,041 vs Hull City (23 September 1987)
- Average home league attendance: 39,244
Home colours	Away colours	Third colours

The 1987–88 season was Manchester United's 86th season in the Football League, and their 13th consecutive season in the top division of English football.

The season was a relative success, with the club finishing second in the league, but they did not play in the UEFA Cup the following season due to the ban on English clubs in Europe after the Heysel Stadium disaster. They finished nine points behind champions Liverpool, who lost just twice all season and for much of the campaign looked uncatchable. Perhaps the most memorable game of the season was in the league at Anfield just before Liverpool's title was confirmed, when United were 3–1 down at half time but fought back to hold the hosts to a 3–3 draw, denying them two points and delaying their bid to seal the title.

United lost just five times in the league in 40 games, and lost only once at Old Trafford, but a few disappointing draws against relatively unfancied sides including Charlton and Luton led to crucial points being dropped and prevented them from mounting a serious threat to Liverpool.

It was Alex Ferguson's first full season as United manager, and it was the first season at the club for new signings Brian McClair (who finished the season as one of the First Division's top scorers with 24 goals) and Viv Anderson. December also saw the arrival of defender Steve Bruce from Norwich City for £900,000, after an approach for Rangers and England defender Terry Butcher collapsed when the player suffered a broken leg.

After the season's end, Ferguson brought Mark Hughes back to Old Trafford from Barcelona in a £1.8 million deal that made him United's record signing. He also replaced Chris Turner in goal by paying £500,000 for Jim Leighton, who played under Ferguson at Aberdeen. He also attempted to sign Paul Gascoigne from Newcastle United, and a deal was agreed, but while Ferguson was on holiday, Gascoigne agreed to join Tottenham Hotspur in the first £2 million fee to be paid by a British club.

It was the last season at United for long-serving defender Kevin Moran, who was transferred to Sporting Gijon after losing his place in the team to Steve Bruce. Remi Moses played his last game for the club before ongoing injury problems forced his retirement from playing, when still in his twenties.

== Pre-season and friendlies ==
Date	Opponents	H / A	Result F–A	Scorers	Attendance
22 July 1987	Næstved	A	2–0	Moran, Robson	6,500
24 July 1987	IS Halmia	A	9–1	Whiteside (4), Davenport (2), Strachan, Olsen, Marshall (o.g.)	2,607
26 July 1987	B 1903	A	3–2	Robson, Davenport, McClair (pen.)	2,500
28 July 1987	Vejle	A	4–1	Anderson, Davenport, Olsen, McClair	7,000
4 August 1987	Manchester City	A	3–1	McClair (2), Robson	20,250
5 August 1987	Atlético Mineiro	N	3–1	McClair (3)	7,150
10 August 1987	Irish League	N	0–0		10,000
21 October 1987	Weymouth	A	0–1		4,904
28 November 1987	Bermuda	A	4–1	Robson, McClair (pen.), Whiteside, Davenport	4,200
1 December 1987	Somerset Trojans	A	4–1	Wilson, McClair, Knox, Olsen	2,000
28 March 1988	Tottenham Hotspur	A	3–2	Strachan (2), Davenport	20,190
22 April 1988	Walsall	A	3–1	Whiteside, Strachan, McClair	6,141
8 May 1988	Manchester City	H	0–2		14,898
17 May 1988	Milan	H	2–3	McClair, Olsen	37,392

=== Football League Centenary Tournament ===
Date	Round	Opponents	H / A	Result F–A	Scorers	Attendance
16 April 1988	Round 1	Luton Town	N	2–0	McClair, Davenport	
16 April 1988	Quarter-final	Everton	N	1–0	Bruce	
17 April 1988	Semi-final	Sheffield Wednesday	N	1–2	Davenport (pen.)	

== First Division ==
Date	Opponents	H / A	Result F–A	Scorers	Attendance	League position
15 August 1987	Southampton	A	2–2	Whiteside (2) 25', 31'	21,214	10th
19 August 1987	Arsenal	H	0–0		43,893	12th
22 August 1987	Watford	H	2–0	McGrath 10', McClair 20'	38,769	7th
29 August 1987	Charlton Athletic	A	3–1	McClair 10', Robson 22', McGrath 45'	14,046	5th
31 August 1987	Chelsea	H	3–1	McClair 25', Strachan 48', Whiteside 83'	46,616	1st
5 September 1987	Coventry City	A	0–0		27,125	2nd
12 September 1987	Newcastle United	H	2–2	Olsen 8', McClair 45' (pen.)	45,619	3rd
19 September 1987	Everton	A	1–2	Whiteside 59'	38,439	6th
26 September 1987	Tottenham Hotspur	H	1–0	McClair 44' (pen.)	48,087	6th
3 October 1987	Luton Town	A	1–1	McClair 54'	9,137	6th
10 October 1987	Sheffield Wednesday	A	4–2	Robson 40', McClair (2) 53', 78', Blackmore 60'	32,779	4th
17 October 1987	Norwich City	H	2–1	Davenport 46', Robson 80'	39,821	4th
24 October 1987	West Ham United	A	1–1	Gibson 45'	19,863	5th
31 October 1987	Nottingham Forest	H	2–2	Robson 54', Whiteside 59'	44,669	5th
15 November 1987	Liverpool	H	1–1	Whiteside 50'	47,106	5th
21 November 1987	Wimbledon	A	1–2	Blackmore 65'	11,532	6th
5 December 1987	Queens Park Rangers	A	2–0	Davenport 35', Robson 74'	20,632	6th
12 December 1987	Oxford United	H	3–1	Strachan (2) 23', 31', Olsen 50'	34,709	4th
19 December 1987	Portsmouth	A	2–1	Robson 35', McClair 48'	22,207	4th
26 December 1987	Newcastle United	A	0–1		26,461	5th
28 December 1987	Everton	H	2–1	McClair (2) 50', 73' (pen.)	47,024	4th
1 January 1988	Charlton Athletic	H	0–0		37,257	4th
2 January 1988	Watford	A	1–0	McClair 39'	18,038	4th
16 January 1988	Southampton	H	0–2		35,716	5th
24 January 1988	Arsenal	A	2–1	Strachan 11', McClair 67'	29,392	3rd
6 February 1988	Coventry City	H	1–0	O'Brien 5'	37,144	3rd
10 February 1988	Derby County	A	2–1	Strachan 71', Whiteside 88'	20,016	2nd
13 February 1988	Chelsea	A	2–1	Bruce 50', O'Brien 52'	25,014	2nd
23 February 1988	Tottenham Hotspur	A	1–1	McClair 82'	25,731	2nd
5 March 1988	Norwich City	A	0–1		19,129	2nd
12 March 1988	Sheffield Wednesday	H	4–1	Blackmore 1', McClair (2) 7', 53', Davenport 79'	33,318	2nd
19 March 1988	Nottingham Forest	A	0–0		27,598	2nd
26 March 1988	West Ham United	H	3–1	Strachan 58', Anderson 83', Robson 90'	37,269	2nd
2 April 1988	Derby County	H	4–1	McClair (3) 16', 23', 64', Gibson 51'	40,146	2nd
4 April 1988	Liverpool	A	3–3	Robson (2) 3', 66', Strachan 77'	43,497	2nd
12 April 1988	Luton Town	H	3–0	McClair 44', Robson 66', Davenport 68'	28,830	2nd
30 April 1988	Queens Park Rangers	H	2–1	Bruce 10', Parker 83' (o.g.)	35,733	2nd
2 May 1988	Oxford United	A	2–0	Anderson 7', Strachan 37'	8,966	2nd
7 May 1988	Portsmouth	H	4–1	McClair (2) 5', 58', Davenport 25', Robson 35'	35,105	2nd
9 May 1988	Wimbledon	H	2–1	McClair (2) 50', 75' (pen.)	28,040	2nd

Pos	Team	Pld	W	D	L	GF	GA	GD	Pts	Qualification or relegation
1	Liverpool (C)	40	26	12	2	87	24	+63	90	Qualified for the Football League Centenary Trophy and disqualified from the European Cup
2	Manchester United	40	23	12	5	71	38	+33	81	Qualified for the Football League Centenary Trophy and disqualified from UEFA Cup
3	Nottingham Forest	40	20	13	7	67	39	+28	73	Qualified for the Football League Centenary Trophy
4	Everton	40	19	13	8	53	27	+26	70	Qualified for the Football League Centenary Trophy
5	Queens Park Rangers	40	19	10	11	48	38	+10	67	Qualified for the Football League Centenary Trophy

Source: World Football
Rules for classification: 1) Points; 2) Goal difference; 3) Goals scored
(C) Champions

== FA Cup ==
Date	Round	Opponents	H / A	Result F–A	Scorers	Attendance
10 January 1988	Round 3	Ipswich Town	A	2–1	D'Avray 28' (o.g.), Anderson 64'	23,012
30 January 1988	Round 4	Chelsea	H	2–0	Whiteside 42', McClair 70'	50,716
20 February 1988	Round 5	Arsenal	A	1–2	McClair 52'	54,161

== League Cup ==
Date	Round	Opponents	H / A	Result F–A	Scorers	Attendance
23 September 1987	Round 2 First leg	Hull City	H	5–0	McGrath 38', Davenport 71', Whiteside 74', Strachan 81', McClair 85'	25,041
7 October 1987	Round 2 Second leg	Hull City	A	1–0	McClair 62'	13,586
28 October 1987	Round 3	Crystal Palace	H	2–1	McClair (2) 7' (pen.), 28'	27,283
18 November 1987	Round 4	Bury	H	2–1	Whiteside 63', McClair 68'	33,519
20 January 1988	Round 5	Oxford United	A	0–2		12,658

== Events of the season ==
Manchester United began the 1987–88 season (the first full season under the management of Alex Ferguson) with new signings in the shape of defender Viv Anderson and striker Brian McClair, while Frank Stapleton and Terry Gibson were both on their way out of Old Trafford.

The First Division season began with Manchester United drawing 2–2 at Southampton, with Norman Whiteside scores both of United's goals, with Southampton's Danny Wallace scoring both of the home side's goals.

Bryan Robson was sent off on 29 August as Manchester United beat Charlton Athletic 3–1 away in their fourth league game of the season, placing them fifth in the First Division.

18 September 1987: Manchester United also made a bid to sign Wales striker Andy Jones from Port Vale, but the player instead opted for Charlton Athletic in a £300,000 deal.

The good progress which saw Manchester United climb to mid table from near the foot of the First Division following Alex Ferguson's appointment last season continued into this season as they soon established themselves as a top five force and the nearest serious challengers to traditional title favourites Liverpool.

Alex Ferguson had long been known to be keen to secure the signing of Mark Hughes, who had to stay outside Britain until at least April 1988 to avoid taxation on money earned since his move from Manchester United to FC Barcelona in June 1986, was reported to be on the verge of signing a permanent contract with Bayern Munich of West Germany after a successful start to his loan spell at the Olympiastadion.

His hopes of signing the Rangers and England defender Terry Butcher were dashed when Rangers manager Graeme Souness offered him a lucrative contract to stay at Ibrox until at least 1993.

On a tour of Bermuda in late November, winger Clayton Blackmore was arrested on allegations of rape but swiftly released from custody after no charges were brought against him.

Alex Ferguson then made a £750,000 bid to bring Steve Bruce to Manchester United from Norwich City, but the offer was rejected. Ferguson had turned his attention back to Bruce following his failure to secure Terry Butcher, having originally been put off Bruce by Norwich's £1 million price tag. A second bid for Steve Bruce - reported to be in the region of £850,000 - was then made, but again rejected. The transfer was finally completed on 18 December at a cost of £900,000 transfer from Norwich City to Manchester United.

Ferguson then looked to boost his attack with an offer for Luton Town striker Mick Harford, but the player decided to remain at Kenilworth Road after manager Ray Harford offered him a four-year contract.

On 10 January 1988, Manchester United's FA Cup quest began with a 2–1 over Ipswich Town in the third round at Portman Road. 10 days later, their hopes of Football League Cup glory were ended by a 2–0 defeat at Oxford United in the quarter-final.

By the end of the month, however, they had progressed to the FA Cup fifth round with a 2–0 home win over Chelsea.

The FA Cup dream ended, however, on 20 February, when they suffered a 2–1 defeat at Arsenal in the fifth round. Brian McClair, the club's leading goalscorer, missed a late penalty that would have forced a replay.

Norman Whiteside, who had spent his whole seven-year playing career at Manchester United, handed in a transfer request near the end of March and spoke of his desire to play football in a foreign country.

On 4 April, Manchester United pulled off a remarkable 3–3 draw with Liverpool at Anfield in a First Division game which Liverpool had led 3–1 at half time. Manchester United trailed Liverpool, who have two games in hand, by 11 points as they still had five games left to play, so Liverpool inevitably clinched the title within three weeks of this game and United had to settle for second place.

On 18 April, Ferguson agreed a deal for Lee Sharpe, the 16-year-old Torquay United winger, for £200,000 - a record fee for a YTS player.

After the end of the season, Ferguson brought Mark Hughes back to Manchester United for a club record fee of £1.8 million and also signed Aberdeen and Scotland goalkeeper Jim Leighton for £500,000. Newcastle United midfielder Paul Gascoigne had looked set to join Manchester United, but then spurned them for a national record £2 million move to Tottenham Hotspur.

== Squad statistics ==
Pos.	Name	League		FA Cup		Littlewoods Cup		Total	
Pos.	Name	Apps	Goals	Apps	Goals	Apps	Goals	Apps	Goals
GK	(England) Chris Turner	24	0	3	0	3	0	30	0
GK	(England) Gary Walsh	16	0	0	0	2	0	18	0
DF	(Scotland) Arthur Albiston	5(6)	0	0	0	0	0	5(6)	0
DF	(England) Viv Anderson	30(1)	2	3	1	4	0	37(1)	3
DF	(Wales) Clayton Blackmore	15(7)	3	1(1)	0	3(1)	0	19(9)	3
DF	(England) Steve Bruce	21	2	3	0	0	0	24	2
DF	(England) Mike Duxbury	39	0	3	0	5	0	47	0
DF	(England) Billy Garton	5(1)	0	0	0	2(1)	0	7(2)	0
DF	(England) Colin Gibson	26(3)	2	2	0	5	0	33(3)	2
DF	(Scotland) Graeme Hogg	9(1)	0	2	0	0(1)	0	11(2)	0
DF	(England) Lee Martin	0(1)	0	0	0	0	0	0(1)	0
DF	(Republic of Ireland) Paul McGrath	21(1)	2	0	0	2	1	23(1)	3
DF	(Republic of Ireland) Kevin Moran	20(1)	0	1	0	2	0	23(1)	0
MF	(England) Remi Moses	16(1)	0	1	0	1(1)	0	18(2)	0
MF	(Republic of Ireland) Liam O'Brien	6(11)	2	0(2)	0	0(2)	0	6(15)	2
MF	(Denmark) Jesper Olsen	30(7)	2	2(1)	0	3(1)	0	35(9)	2
MF	(England) Bryan Robson	36	11	2	0	5	0	43	11
MF	(Scotland) Gordon Strachan	33(3)	8	3	0	5	1	41(3)	9
FW	(England) Peter Davenport	21(13)	5	1(1)	0	3(1)	1	25(15)	6
FW	(Wales) Deiniol Graham	1	0	0	0	0(1)	0	1(1)	0
FW	(Scotland) Brian McClair	40	24	3	2	5	5	48	31
FW	(Northern Ireland) Norman Whiteside	26(1)	7	3	1	5	2	34(1)	10
