= 1983 FA Charity Shield =

- Match programme cover
Manchester United	Liverpool
2	0
- Date: 20 August 1983
- Venue: Wembley Stadium, London
- Referee: Alan Robinson (Hampshire)
- Attendance: 92,000

The 1983 FA Charity Shield was the 61st FA Charity Shield, an annual football match played between the winners of the previous season's First Division and FA Cup competitions. The match was played on 20 August 1983 at Wembley Stadium and contested by Liverpool, who had won the 1982–83 First Division, and Manchester United, who had won the 1982–83 FA Cup. Manchester United won 2–0 with a brace from captain Bryan Robson. It was Liverpool's first competitive game under the management of Joe Fagan, who had been promoted from the coaching staff to replace the retiring Bob Paisley.

== Match details ==
20 August 1983
15:00 UTC+1

Manchester United	2–0	Liverpool
Robson 23', 60'	Report

Wembley Stadium, London
Attendance: 92,000
Referee: Alan Robinson (Hampshire)

Manchester United	Liverpool

GK	1	(England) Gary Bailey
DF	2	(England) Mike Duxbury
DF	3	(Scotland) Arthur Albiston
MF	4	(England) Ray Wilkins
DF	5	(Republic of Ireland) Kevin Moran
DF	6	(Scotland) Gordon McQueen
MF	7	(England) Bryan Robson (c)
MF	8	(Netherlands) Arnold Mühren	(substituted off) 65'
FW	9	(Republic of Ireland) Frank Stapleton
FW	10	(Northern Ireland) Norman Whiteside
MF	11	(Scotland) Arthur Graham
Substitutes:
DF	12	(England) John Gidman	(substituted on) 65'
MF	13	(Scotland) Lou Macari
GK	14	(England) Jeff Wealands
MF	15	(England) Remi Moses
Manager:
(England) Ron Atkinson

GK	1	(Zimbabwe) Bruce Grobbelaar
RB	2	(England) Phil Neal
LB	3	(England) Alan Kennedy
CM	4	(Republic of Ireland) Mark Lawrenson
CB	5	(England) Phil Thompson	(substituted off) 61'
CB	6	(Scotland) Alan Hansen
CF	7	(Scotland) Kenny Dalglish
RM	8	(England) Sammy Lee
CF	9	(Wales) Ian Rush
LM	10	(Republic of Ireland) Michael Robinson	(substituted off) 61'
CM	11	(Scotland) Graeme Souness (c)
Substitutes:
MF	12	(Australia) Craig Johnston	(substituted on) 61'
FW	13	(England) David Hodgson	(substituted on) 61'
GK	14	(England) Bob Bolder
Manager:
(England) Joe Fagan

Match rules

- 90 minutes, no extra time
- Four named substitutes
- Maximum of two substitutions

== See also ==
- 1982–83 Football League
- 1982–83 FA Cup
