= 1983 Football League Cup final =

- Event: 1982–83 Football League Cup
Liverpool	Manchester United
2	1
- After extra time
- Date: 26 March 1983
- Venue: Wembley Stadium, London
- Referee: George Courtney (County Durham)
- Attendance: 99,304

The 1983 Football League Cup final was a football match held on 26 March 1983 between League Cup holders Liverpool and first-time finalists Manchester United, who won the FA Cup later that year. Liverpool won the match 2–1; Norman Whiteside scored the opener for Manchester United, before Alan Kennedy equalised with 15 minutes to go. The winner was scored in the eighth minute of extra-time by Ronnie Whelan.

Had Manchester United won the League Cup as well as the FA Cup that year, they would have become the first team ever to have won the two competitions in the same season. Instead, Liverpool won their third successive League Cup, and the second of three successive League and League Cup Doubles.

The match was played at Wembley Stadium in front of approximately 100,000 spectators.

Liverpool manager Bob Paisley collected the trophy, as it was his last major final in charge of Liverpool.

== Match details ==
26 March 1983
15:00

Liverpool	2–1 (a.e.t.)	Manchester United
Kennedy 75'; Whelan 98'	Report	Whiteside 12'

Wembley Stadium, London
Attendance: 99,304
Referee: George Courtney (County Durham)

Liverpool	Manchester United

GK	1	(Zimbabwe) Bruce Grobbelaar
RB	2	(England) Phil Neal
LB	3	(England) Alan Kennedy
CB	4	(Republic of Ireland) Mark Lawrenson
LM	5	(Republic of Ireland) Ronnie Whelan
CB	6	(Scotland) Alan Hansen
CF	7	(Scotland) Kenny Dalglish
RM	8	(England) Sammy Lee
CF	9	(Wales) Ian Rush
CM	10	(Australia) Craig Johnston	(substituted off) 83'
CM	11	(Scotland) Graeme Souness (c)
Substitute:
FW	12	(England) David Fairclough	(substituted on) 83'
Manager:
(England) Bob Paisley

GK	1	(England) Gary Bailey
RB	2	(England) Mike Duxbury
LB	3	(Scotland) Arthur Albiston
CM	4	(England) Remi Moses
CB	5	(Republic of Ireland) Kevin Moran	(substituted off) 69'
CB	6	(Scotland) Gordon McQueen
CM	7	(England) Ray Wilkins (c)
LM	8	(Netherlands) Arnold Mühren
CF	9	(Republic of Ireland) Frank Stapleton
CF	10	(Northern Ireland) Norman Whiteside
RM	11	(England) Steve Coppell
Substitute:
FW	12	(Scotland) Lou Macari	(substituted on) 69'
Manager:
(England) Ron Atkinson

Match rules

- 90 minutes.
- 30 minutes of extra-time if necessary.
- Replay if scores still level.
- One named substitute.
- Maximum of one substitution.
