= 1993–94 Leicester City F.C. season =

1993–94 season of Leicester City

Leicester City
1993–94 season
- Chairman: Martin George
- Manager: Brian Little
- Stadium: Filbert Street
- First Division: 4th (promoted via playoffs)
- FA Cup: Third round
- League Cup: Third round
- Top goalscorer: Roberts (13)
- Highest home attendance: 21,744 vs. Watford (27 December 1993)
- Lowest home attendance: 10,366 vs. Birmingham City (12 September 1993)
- Average home league attendance: 16,005

During the 1993–94 English football season, Leicester City F.C. competed in the Football League First Division.

== Season summary ==
In the 1993–1994 season, it was third time lucky for Leicester as they beat East Midlands rivals Derby County 2–1 in the final to secure promotion to the FA Premier League after seven years outside the top division. Striker David Speedie was suspended for the final, having been sent off in the semi-final against Tranmere Rovers.

== Final league table ==
Pos	Team	Pld	W	D	L	GF	GA	GD	Pts	Qualification or relegation
2	Nottingham Forest (P)	46	23	14	9	74	49	+25	83	Promotion to the Premier League
3	Millwall	46	19	17	10	58	49	+9	74	Qualification for the First Division play-offs
4	Leicester City (O, P)	46	19	16	11	72	59	+13	73	Qualification for the First Division play-offs
5	Tranmere Rovers	46	21	9	16	69	53	+16	72	Qualification for the First Division play-offs
6	Derby County	46	20	11	15	73	68	+5	71	Qualification for the First Division play-offs

Source: rsssf.com
Rules for classification: 1) Points; 2) Goals scored; 3) Goal difference
(O) Play-off winners; (P) Promoted

== Results ==
Leicester City's score comes first

=== Legend ===
Win	Draw	Loss

=== Football League First Division ===
Date	Opponent	Venue	Result	Attendance	Scorers
14 August 1993	Peterborough United	H	2–1	13,671	Thompson, James
21 August 1993	Tranmere Rovers	A	0–1	8,766	
28 August 1993	Millwall	H	4–0	12,219	Agnew, Walsh (2), Joachim
12 September 1993	Birmingham City	H	1–1	10,366	Walsh
14 September 1993	Bristol City	A	3–1	7,899	Speedie (2), Walsh
18 September 1993	Bolton Wanderers	A	2–1	12,049	Speedie (2)
25 September 1993	Barnsley	A	1–0	10,392	Oldfield
29 September 1993	Middlesbrough	A	0–2	11,871	
2 October 1993	Notts County	H	3–2	16,319	Speedie (2), Thompson (pen)
16 October 1993	Charlton Athletic	A	1–2	8,316	Agnew
24 October 1993	Nottingham Forest	H	1–0	17,624	Speedie
30 October 1993	Luton Town	A	2–0	8,813	Thompson (pen), Speedie
2 November 1993	Grimsby Town	A	0–0	6,346	
6 November 1993	Southend United	H	3–0	15,387	Joachim, Oldfield, Thompson (pen)
14 November 1993	Stoke City	A	0–1	15,984	
20 November 1993	Oxford United	H	2–3	14,070	Thompson (pen), Whitlow
27 November 1993	Wolverhampton Wanderers	H	2–2	18,395	Roberts (2)
5 December 1993	Southend United	A	0–0	6,114	
8 December 1993	Crystal Palace	H	1–1	16,706	Roberts
11 December 1993	Bristol City	H	3–0	13,394	Speedie (2), Joachim
19 December 1993	Peterborough United	A	1–1	8,595	Bradshaw (own goal)
27 December 1993	Watford	H	4–4	21,744	Thompson (pen), Oldfield (2), Ormondroyd
28 December 1993	Derby County	A	2–3	17,372	Joachim, Roberts
1 January 1994	Sunderland	H	2–1	19,615	Speedie, Joachim
12 January 1994	West Bromwich Albion	H	4–2	15,640	Roberts (2), Whitlow, Mardon (own goal)
16 January 1994	Charlton Athletic	H	2–1	12,577	Grayson, Roberts
22 January 1994	Crystal Palace	A	1–2	17,045	Thompson
6 February 1994	Nottingham Forest	A	0–4	26,616	
12 February 1994	Luton Town	H	2–1	16,149	Coatsworth, Roberts
19 February 1994	West Bromwich Albion	A	2–1	18,153	Roberts, Ormondroyd
23 February 1994	Tranmere Rovers	H	1–1	14,028	McGreal (own goal)
6 March 1994	Millwall	A	0–0	8,085	
12 March 1994	Middlesbrough	H	2–0	16,116	Joachim, Speedie
15 March 1994	Birmingham City	A	3–0	14,681	Joachim, Ormondroyd, Roberts
19 March 1994	Barnsley	H	0–1	15,640	
26 March 1994	Notts County	A	1–4	11,907	Ormondroyd
30 March 1994	Portsmouth	H	0–3	15,146	
2 April 1994	Watford	A	1–1	8,645	Agnew
5 April 1994	Derby County	H	3–3	20,050	Roberts (3)
9 April 1994	Sunderland	A	3–2	17,198	Joachim (2), Kerr (pen)
16 April 1994	Grimsby Town	H	1–1	15,859	Joachim
23 April 1994	Oxford United	A	2–2	8,818	Blake, Joachim
26 April 1994	Portsmouth	A	1–0	7,869	Kerr
30 April 1994	Stoke City	H	1–1	19,219	Willis
3 May 1994	Bolton Wanderers	H	1–1	18,145	Gee
8 May 1994	Wolverhampton Wanderers	A	1–1	27,229	Coatsworth

=== First Division play-offs ===
Round	Date	Opponent	Venue	Result	Attendance	Scorers
SF 1st Leg	15 May 1994	Tranmere Rovers	A	0–0	14,962	
SF 2nd Leg	18 May 1994	Tranmere Rovers	H	2–1 (won 2–1 on agg)	22,593	Ormondroyd, Speedie
F	30 May 1994	Derby County	N	2–1	73,671	Walsh (2)

=== FA Cup ===
Round	Date	Opponent	Venue	Result	Attendance	Goalscorers
R3	8 January 1994	Manchester City	A	1–4	22,613	Oldfield

=== League Cup ===
Round	Date	Opponent	Venue	Result	Attendance	Goalscorers
R2 1st Leg	21 September 1993	Rochdale	A	6–1	4,491	Whitlow, Walsh, Thompson, Oldfield, Speedie, Ormondroyd
R2 2nd Leg	6 October 1993	Rochdale	H	2–1	7,612	Ormondroyd, Joachim
R3	27 October 1993	Manchester United	A	1–5	41,344	Hill

=== Anglo-Italian Cup ===
Round	Date	Opponent	Venue	Result	Attendance	Goalscorers
PR Group 4	31 August 1993	Peterborough United	A	3–4	3,830	Oldfield (pen), Gee (2)
PR Group 4	8 September 1993	West Bromwich Albion	H	0–0	3,588	

== Squad ==
Note: Flags indicate national team as defined under FIFA eligibility rules; some limited exceptions apply. Players may hold more than one non-FIFA nationality.

No.	Pos.	Nation	Player
-	GK	(England) ENG	Gavin Ward
-	DF	(England) ENG	Colin Hill
-	DF	(England) ENG	Mike Whitlow
-	DF	(Republic of Ireland) IRL	Brian Carey
-	DF	(England) ENG	Steve Walsh
-	DF	(England) ENG	Tony James
-	MF	(England) ENG	Gary Mills
-	MF	(England) ENG	Steve Thompson
-	FW	(Scotland) SCO	David Speedie
-	MF	(England) ENG	Steve Agnew
-	MF	(England) ENG	Lee Philpott
-	FW	(England) ENG	Julian Joachim
-	DF	(England) ENG	Richard Smith
-	GK	(England) ENG	Kevin Poole

No.	Pos.	Nation	Player
-	MF	(England) ENG	Colin Gibson
-	FW	(England) ENG	Ian Ormondroyd
-	DF	(England) ENG	Simon Grayson
-	DF	(England) ENG	Neil Lewis
-	DF	(England) ENG	Jimmy Willis
-	MF	(England) ENG	David Lowe
-	FW	(England) ENG	Phil Gee
-	MF	(England) ENG	David Oldfield
-	DF	(England) ENG	Gary Coatsworth
-	FW	(Wales) WAL	Iwan Roberts
-	DF	(England) ENG	Scott Eustace
-	MF	(England) ENG	Mark Blake
-	MF	(England) ENG	Paul Kerr (on loan from Port Vale)

=== Left club during the season ===
Note: Flags indicate national team as defined under FIFA eligibility rules; some limited exceptions apply. Players may hold more than one non-FIFA nationality.

No. / Pos. / Nation / Player; - / FW / (England) ENG / Bobby Davison (to Sheffield United)	No. / Pos. / Nation / Player; - / GK / (England) ENG / Carl Muggleton (to Celtic)
