= 1985 FA Cup final =

English association football match

1985 FA Cup Final
- Event: 1984–85 FA Cup
Everton	Manchester United
0	1
- After extra time
- Date: 18 May 1985
- Venue: Wembley Stadium, London
- Referee: Peter Willis (County Durham)
- Attendance: 100,000

The 1985 FA Cup final was the 104th final of the FA Cup. It took place on 18 May 1985 at Wembley Stadium, and was contested by Manchester United and holders Everton. United won by a single goal, scored in extra time by Norman Whiteside, when he curled the ball into the net past the reach of Neville Southall after a run from the right.

== Match ==
=== Summary ===
Everton were playing for the opportunity to win an unprecedented treble, having won the First Division title by a margin of 13 points with three games to spare and beaten Rapid Wien in the 1985 European Cup Winners' Cup Final in Rotterdam just three days earlier. Meanwhile, Manchester United had finished fourth in the league and reached the quarter-finals of the UEFA Cup. The two sides met three times during the 1984–85 season prior to the FA Cup final; first, a 5–0 Everton win in the league at Goodison Park on 27 October 1984, followed by a 2–1 Everton win in the third round of the League Cup at Old Trafford three days later (Everton were ultimately knocked out of the League Cup by Grimsby Town in the following round). The third meeting, also at Old Trafford, was a 1–1 league draw on 2 March 1985.

Eight of United's starting 11 had been members of the cup-winning side from two years earlier, while Arthur Albiston was the only remaining player from the team that won the 1977 FA Cup Final. When United next won the trophy in 1990, Mark Hughes and Bryan Robson were the only players from the 1985 side to feature in the winning team. Everton's last remaining player from this match was Neville Southall, who stayed with them until 1998 and helped them win a league title in 1987 and the FA Cup in 1995, also against United – where he and Welsh compatriot Hughes were the only survivors from the 1985 final.

The match was preceded by a minute's silence in memory of those who had died in the Bradford City stadium fire a week earlier.

Everton's Peter Reid had the first chance of the game after about 15 minutes; Manchester United goalkeeper Gary Bailey came to meet a long throw-in from Gary Stevens, but his punch was poor and only went as far as Reid on the edge of the penalty area. Reid volleyed the ball goalwards, but it was deflected onto the post by a sliding John Gidman.

With just under 15 minutes left in the second half, Kevin Moran of Manchester United became the first player to be sent off in an FA Cup Final, for committing a professional foul on Peter Reid, who was clean through on goal.

The match remained goalless after 90 minutes and went to extra time. Five minutes after half-time in extra time, Manchester United's Norman Whiteside scored the winner, curling a low shot around Everton's Pat Van Den Hauwe and past goalkeeper Neville Southall into the bottom corner of the net.

Having been sent off, Moran was not allowed to collect his medal with the rest of the Manchester United team as they received the trophy, although The Football Association later voted to allow him to receive one while the team was on holiday in Trinidad.

Two weeks after the match, rioting by Liverpool fans towards Juventus fans at the 1985 European Cup Final caused the Heysel disaster, in which 39 Juventus fans were unlawfully killed. As a result, UEFA banned all English clubs from competing in European competitions indefinitely, which meant United were unable to compete in the following season's Cup Winners' Cup. Everton were also banned from competing as league winners in the 1985–86 European Cup. The ban stood for five years, with Liverpool receiving a further year's exclusion.

=== Details ===
18 May 1985
15:00 BST

Everton	0–1 (a.e.t.)	Manchester United
	Report	Whiteside 110'

Wembley Stadium, London
Attendance: 100,000
Referee: Peter Willis (County Durham)

Everton	Manchester United

GK	1	(Wales) Neville Southall
RB	2	(England) Gary Stevens
LB	3	(Wales) Pat Van Den Hauwe
CB	4	(Wales) Kevin Ratcliffe (c)
CB	5	(England) Derek Mountfield
CM	6	(England) Peter Reid
RM	7	(England) Trevor Steven
CF	8	(Scotland) Graeme Sharp
CF	9	(Scotland) Andy Gray
CM	10	(England) Paul Bracewell
LM	11	(Republic of Ireland) Kevin Sheedy
Substitute:
DF	12	(England) Alan Harper
Manager:
(England) Howard Kendall

GK	1	(England) Gary Bailey
RB	2	(England) John Gidman
LB	3	(Scotland) Arthur Albiston		(substituted off) 91'
CM	4	(Northern Ireland) Norman Whiteside
CB	5	(Republic of Ireland) Paul McGrath
CB	6	(Republic of Ireland) Kevin Moran	(red card) 78'
CM	7	(England) Bryan Robson (c)	Booked
RM	8	(Scotland) Gordon Strachan
CF	9	(Wales) Mark Hughes
CF	10	(Republic of Ireland) Frank Stapleton
LM	11	(Denmark) Jesper Olsen
Substitute:
DF	12	(England) Mike Duxbury		(substituted on) 91'
Manager:
(England) Ron Atkinson

Match officials

- Linesmen:
  - Terry Holbrook (Staffordshire)
  - D. Keen (Berks & Bucks)
- Reserve linesman: J. R. Harris (Suffolk)

Match rules

- 90 minutes
- 30 minutes of extra-time if necessary
- Replay if scores still level
- One named substitute
- Maximum of one substitution
