= Norman Whiteside =

Northern Irish footballer (born 1965)

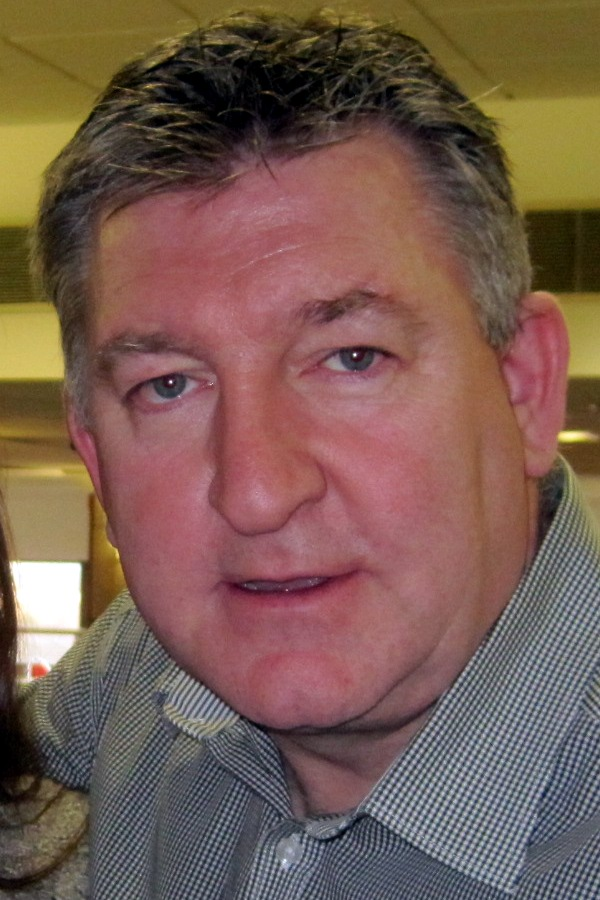
- Whiteside in 2013

Personal information
- Full name: Norman Whiteside
- Date of birth: 7 May 1965 (age 61)
- Place of birth: Belfast, Northern Ireland
- Height: 6 ft 2 in (1.88 m)
- Positions: Midfielder; forward

Youth career
- 1978–1982: Manchester United

Senior career*
Years	Team	Apps	(Gls)
1982–1989	Manchester United	206	(47)
1989–1991	Everton	29	(9)
Total		235	(56)

International career
	Northern Ireland Schoolboys	8	(0)
1989	Northern Ireland U23	1	(0)
1982–1989	Northern Ireland	38	(9)
- * Club domestic league appearances and goals

Norman Whiteside (born 7 May 1965) is a Northern Irish former professional footballer who played as a midfielder and forward.

Whiteside began his career at Manchester United, signing professional forms in 1982 at the age of 17 and quickly became a key member of the side. He scored 68 goals in 278 league and cup appearances for the club over the next seven years, picking up two FA Cup winner's medals in 1983 and 1985, as well as playing in the 1982 FA Youth Cup final, the 1983 League Cup final, and the FA Charity Shield in 1983.

He remained with United until July 1989, when he was sold to Everton for £600,000. However, he retired from playing two years later, aged only 26, due to a knee injury.

Whiteside holds records as the youngest player to take part in a FIFA World Cup, the youngest player to score in a League Cup and FA Cup final, and the youngest player to score a senior goal for Manchester United. Winning 38 caps for Northern Ireland, he played at the 1982 and 1986 World Cups, and also helped his country to win the last British Home Championship in 1983–84. After retiring as a player he became a podiatrist, and still works at the corporate hospitality department at Old Trafford.

== Early years ==
Born in Belfast to Norman and Aileen Whiteside, he grew up on Shankill Road; because of this and his aggressive, physical playing style, he was later nicknamed the "Shankill Skinhead" by Manchester United supporters. The family later moved to 10 Danube Street, and the family's poverty meant that Whiteside had to share a bed with his two brothers. He remained relatively unscathed by The Troubles, for his Protestant parents kept a firm watch on their children to ensure that they did not stray far from home and that none of them became involved with Ulster loyalism. At the age of around seven he joined the Boys' Brigade, and quickly showed his natural talent for football, scoring ten goals in a game against boys almost twice his age. He was educated at Cairnmartin High School, and became famous in the Shankill area as a footballing prodigy by the age of 11.

He was said to have been discovered by Ipswich Town scout Jim Rodgers (his goals at schoolboy level meant that he was already well known to all the football scouts in Northern Ireland), who was told by manager Bobby Robson to wait until Whiteside grew older. Instead, it was Manchester United's 80-year-old Ulster scout Bob Bishop, who previously unearthed Belfast-born George Best and Sammy McIlroy for the club, who first offered him a trial at an English club. Whiteside's family were Manchester United supporters, though the youngster himself held no particular allegiance. He found that he had been offered schoolboy terms at the club during a school trip to the United States; on the trip, he and his classmates met President Jimmy Carter at the Oval Office, a rare and extraordinary occasion for children from a disadvantaged background.

== Club career ==
=== Manchester United ===
A few days before Whiteside was old enough to sign schoolboy terms with Manchester United, he was offered a trial at Liverpool, causing United's chief scout Joe Brown to fly over to Belfast to immediately offer him the schoolboy contract to sign. Whiteside remained in Belfast, and flew over to Manchester every weekend for training. From the age of 14 he was constantly compared to George Best (by that time in the twilight of his career), and Whiteside did little to discourage such comparisons when he told a journalist that "the only thing I have in common with George Best is that we come from the same place, play for the same club and were discovered by the same man".

His injury problems started as early as 1980, when he was 15 years old and saw Glentoran's physio Bobby McGregor to resolve a groin strain; Whiteside said that the highly physical massage to which he was subjected damaged his pelvis and robbed him of his natural pace. His lack of pace was later seen as the one weakness in his game. Six weeks into his apprenticeship, in July 1981, and an innocuous looking challenge by a Preston North End player in an 'A' team game saw Whiteside requiring an operation on his right knee. Had the injury occurred a couple of years later he would have been able to have pioneering keyhole surgery, which could potentially have saved his career. After a seven-month lay-off and a further operation to remove cartilage, he returned to fitness in January 1982. He had to adapt his playing style to compensate for his damaged knee and pelvis, and developed well under youth team coach Eric Harrison.

Whiteside became United's youngest first-team player since Duncan Edwards in 1953, when he made his debut as a substitute against Brighton & Hove Albion in a 1–0 league win at the Goldstone Ground on 24 April 1982, two weeks before his 17th birthday. He later played in the FA Youth Cup final defeat to Watford, though it would be just another year before he appeared in the final of the senior competition. He turned professional at Old Trafford on his 17th birthday, signing a three-year contract, and he shared a room with Steve Coppell, who was heading into retirement due to a knee injury of his own. He also struck up a close friendship with Paul McGrath, who would also face similar problems with his knee. On the final day of the season, eight days after his 17th birthday, he became the club's youngest goalscorer in a 2–0 home win over Stoke City.

His performances at the World Cup convinced manager Ron Atkinson to start Whiteside alongside Frank Stapleton at the front of United's attack for the 1982–83 season. The pair were similar players in that they held the ball up and made frequent runs into the box, allowing midfielder Bryan Robson to join in the attack. Whiteside scored four goals in the first five games of the campaign, before entering a seventeen-game drought. He scored six goals in 16 games in domestic cup competitions that season, helping Manchester United to the finals of both the League Cup and FA Cup, notably by scoring past Arsenal in the FA Cup semi-finals. At the age of 17 years and 323 days, he beat Liverpool centre-half Alan Hansen to score in the League Cup final defeat at Wembley, making him the youngest player to score in a League Cup final; his consistent performances against Liverpool during the 1980s earned him the moniker of the "Scourge of the Scousers" from United supporters. He gave an assist to Stapleton in the FA Cup Final, which finished as a 2–2 draw with Brighton & Hove Albion. At the age of 18 years and 18 days, he then scored a headed goal in the replay, which United won 4–0, to become the youngest player to score in an FA Cup Final. He also became the first player to score in both domestic cup finals in the same season. He played 57 times in all competitions that season and missed just three league games, scoring a total of 14 goals.

Manchester United later accepted a £1.5 million offer for Whiteside from A.C. Milan, and offered him £100,000 in cash to accept the transfer. He refused the move, for he felt he still had a good future with Manchester United and because he was given only a brief time to consider whether or not to relocate to a club and location about which he knew little. He continued to impress, despite on-loan striker Garth Crooks being tipped to take his first-team place and sign a permanent contract (which never happened). United were trophyless however in 1983–84, exiting both domestic cup competitions to Third Division sides. He did though play a part in the 3–0 win over Barcelona at Old Trafford in the Third Round of the European Cup Winners' Cup, which overturned a 2–0 deficit from the first leg. He lost his starting place to Mark Hughes for the semi-final clash with Juventus at the Stadio Olimpico di Torino, which ended in a 2–1 defeat.

By February 1985, he had started just eight games in the 1984–85 season, having fallen behind in the pecking order to Stapleton, Hughes, and new signing Alan Brazil. However, injury to midfielder Remi Moses left an opening at the centre of the field, and Whiteside proved to be a revelation in the role with his intelligent play and positioning skills, and stayed in midfield for the rest of manager Ron Atkinson's time at the club. He formed a solid partnership with Bryan Robson, despite the two being similarly attacking players, and United lost just one of their first 15 games with this new midfield partnership in operation. Whiteside scored the only hat-trick of his professional career in a 4–2 home win over West Ham United on 9 March 1985, in the FA Cup quarter-finals; it was a 'perfect hat-trick' in that he scored once with each foot and once with his head. He went on to score the winning goal in the 1985 FA Cup Final, curling a shot in from the right hand side in the 20th minute of extra time, to give ten-man United victory over Everton, and Whiteside his second FA Cup winner's medal. The goal required vision, timing, and precise shooting; and The Guardian praised his "cool footballing brain" and "clever concealment of the shot". After this success he negotiated a new contract of £60,000 a year.

United won their first 10 league games of the 1985–86 campaign, and unbeaten from their first 15, and seemed destined to win the First Division title. However they dropped off in mid-season and won just six of their final 18 games to end the season in fourth place, 12 points behind champions Liverpool. The press blamed the decline in form on the club's drinking culture and Ron Atkinson's lax disciplinary attitude, though in his autobiography Whiteside denies that this was to blame, and states that stories of the player's drinking sessions were exaggerated.

That summer, a 21-year-old Whiteside played in his second World Cup.

Then came a decline in his career at an early age, which started to around the time of the arrival of new manager Alex Ferguson in November 1986, the change of manager coming after a dismal start to the season led to the decision to sack Ron Atkinson. Whiteside, still only 21, was facing trouble from his right knee which was now beginning to require serious medical procedures to prevent it from causing his retirement. Ferguson put Whiteside back up front, and in turn he scored three times in his first four games back from injury. Ferguson did though have to rebuke Whiteside after some of his numerous drinking sessions. He ended the 1986–87 season with 10 goals in 37 appearances, however United could only manage an 11th-place finish.

"I felt the excitement that is felt by watching a player of the highest class. He had self-assurance that was extraordinary in a 21-year-old. The excellence of his technique gave him easy mastery of the ball and he had the gift of making time for himself in the stamp of quality. He was an island of composure, looking up and unhurriedly making his decisions. He rarely surrendered possession and he increased the angle and weight of his passes so well that the receiver never had to fight the ball. His eyes were as cold as steel and he had the temperament to match. As a player, he was close to the genius category."

— The media reported that Ferguson did not like Whiteside, but "Fergie" had nothing but praise for the player in his autobiography.

At the start of the 1987–88 season, Whiteside represented the Football League in a game against the 'Rest of the World' to celebrate the league's centenary. He formed a solid partnership with new signing Brian McClair, scoring 10 goals in 35 appearances, though United finished second in the league behind Liverpool, and he often found himself back in midfield or on the bench when Peter Davenport was selected to play alongside McClair. However, he felt that he was due a better contract, and decided to 'call the bluff' of the club by handing in a transfer request. Recovering from injury and abuse from some supporters for his transfer request, he put what many United fans call the best performance of his career at Anfield on 4 April 1988, when he came off a substitute with his team 3–1 down to help United to salvage a point.

He ruptured his Achilles midway through the 1987–88 season, and missed almost a year of first-team action. Whiteside's goal in a 2–1 win over Derby County in a league match at the Baseball Ground on 10 February 1988 would prove to be his last for Manchester United.

In the summer of 1988, he was put on the transfer list and came close to joining American club Portland Timbers, before injury put negotiations on hold. A £1million price tag also deterred a great deal of potential interest.

In the summer of 1988, Ferguson brought striker Mark Hughes back to Old Trafford after two years away, further limiting Whiteside's opportunities for the first team. His continued fitness problems, and the growing competition for places in the first team, meant that Whiteside played just six league games in the 1988–89 season.

In view of Whiteside's medical reports, Ferguson rejected bids of £500,000 from Osasuna of Spain and from Ron Atkinson's new club Sheffield Wednesday, before accepting a bid of £600,000 (with £150,000 to follow if Whiteside reached 50 games) from Everton in July 1989. This was to the dismay of some of the club's supporters, who felt that there was still a way back for Whiteside at Old Trafford. Ferguson intended to build his own team having signed midfield duo Neil Webb and Mike Phelan, and also in the hunt for other players including Paul Ince, Gary Pallister and Danny Wallace.

He had played a total of 274 games in all competitions for United, scoring 67 goals, and collected two winner's medals in the FA Cup, despite only being 24 years old when he left.

=== Everton ===
Whiteside signed a four-year contract with Everton, and Alex Ferguson helped him to negotiate a pay deal that would see him earn more in two years at Goodison Park than he had done during his eight years in Manchester. He was also offered £50,000 to put his name to a tabloid article criticising Ferguson, but he declined the offer. At the time Everton boasted more recent success than Manchester United, having won two league titles, an FA Cup and the European Cup Winners' Cup. Manager Colin Harvey was planning to boost the "Toffees" chances of more silverware, and also in 1989 signed Mike Newell, Martin Keown, Stefan Rehn and Raymond Atteveld. Whiteside became Everton's playmaker in 1989–90, and formed an effective partnership with Stuart McCall in midfield to score 13 goals in his 35 appearances. Everton finished the season in sixth place, some 20 points behind rivals Liverpool.

However intense running sessions run by coach Mick Lyons took their toll on his right knee, and on 20 September 1990 he took a knock in a practice match, which required him to have yet another operation on his right knee. After the return of Howard Kendall as manager in November 1990, Whiteside managed to appear in a few reserve team games, but this only delayed the inevitable, and he was forced to retire from the game at the age of 26 in June 1991. He had a testimonial game between Manchester United and Everton at Old Trafford in May 1992, but as United lost the title the previous week, only 7,434 turned out for the occasion.

== International career ==
Whiteside broke Pelé's record as the youngest player to appear in a World Cup, when he debuted for Northern Ireland aged 17 years and 41 days at the 1982 World Cup in Spain. When selected for the World Cup squad by manager Billy Bingham, he had played just two competitive games at club level. The opening game against Yugoslavia at the La Romareda in Zaragoza on 17 June was his international debut; he received a yellow card in the second half for a challenge on Nenad Stojković, and the game finished goalless. Five days later he helped his side to a 1–1 draw with Honduras, which was a disappointment, and many believed had doomed Northern Ireland's chances of advancing in the competition. They needed a win against hosts Spain in the third and final group game at the Mestalla Stadium in Valencia. They faced a partisan atmosphere with a mostly Spanish crowd and a Spanish speaking referee in Héctor Ortiz who was unwilling to punish dirty play from the Spanish players. However a mistake from goalkeeper Luis Arconada gifted Gerry Armstrong the only goal of the game, and despite having Mal Donaghy sent off on 60 minutes, Northern Ireland went on to record a 1–0 win. Whiteside played at left-midfielder for the 2–2 draw with Austria at the Vicente Calderón Stadium. A win against France would take them into the semi-finals, however a French team inspired by Michel Platini won 4–1 and therefore eliminated Northern Ireland from the competition.

He featured in qualifying for UEFA Euro 1984. They won their final group game 1–0 over West Germany, Whiteside managing to get the better of one of the world's best man-markers in Karlheinz Förster. However the Germans secured the only qualification place in the group in their final match of the group with a late winner over Albania.

Whiteside helped Northern Ireland win the centenary, and last, edition of the British Home Championship in 1983–84.

Northern Ireland won qualification to the World Cup for a second successive tournament with a goalless draw with England in their final group game; Whiteside scored three goals during the qualification process, with his strike again Romania at Windsor Park proving to be crucial as they ended up qualifying at the Romanians' expense. At the 1986 FIFA World Cup finals in Mexico, he scored with a deflected free-kick in the 1–1 draw against Algeria at the Estadio Tres de Marzo. They were beaten in their other two group games, losing 2–1 to Spain and 3–0 to Brazil. Whiteside won a total of 38 caps and scored nine times in eight years playing for Northern Ireland.

== Personal life and post-retirement ==
He married English-born wife Julie on 4 October 1987; the two had met when Whiteside was 16 and she was 20. The couple had three children: Della, Blaine and Clodagh. The marriage ended in 2001 and Whiteside subsequently remarried, to Denise. He became a grandfather in 2023 when Blaine had a daughter.

Upon retirement, Whiteside studied to become a podiatrist, graduating with a degree from the University of Salford, and served Northwich Victoria as their assistant manager and physiotherapist from October 1991 until March 1992. He quit the role as he did not enjoy the amount of time spent travelling between games. During his playing career, he had attended courses at Lilleshall to qualify for his coaching badges, but he did not wish to go into coaching. He instead became an after-dinner speaker. He also worked for the Professional Footballers' Association, while taking a postgraduate course at Manchester Metropolitan University. He later took up private practice as a podiatrist in Manchester. Since 1994, he has also worked at the corporate hospitality department at Old Trafford. In 2003, he released a book entitled My Memories of Manchester United. With the help of writer Rob Bagchi, he released his autobiography entitled Determined in August 2007, published by Headline, and with a foreword by actor James Nesbitt.

When Saturday Comes magazine reviewer Joyce Woolridge wrote that "Determined is an entertaining, well written account of one of the less ordinary 1980s footballers, with the added twist of how Whiteside was able to rebuild his life, if not his knee." The next month it was reported that Whiteside had been diagnosed with irregular heart rhythms. Whiteside worked as a pundit on ITV's coverage of UEFA Euro 2016.

== Career statistics ==
=== Club ===
Appearances and goals by club, season and competition
Club	Season	League			FA Cup		League Cup		Europe		Other		Total	
Club	Season	Division	Apps	Goals	Apps	Goals	Apps	Goals	Apps	Goals	Apps	Goals	Apps	Goals
Manchester United	1981–82	First Division	2	1	0	0	0	0	—		—		2	1
Manchester United	1982–83	First Division	39	8	7	3	9	3	2 (Note: Appearances in UEFA Cup)	0	—		57	14
Manchester United	1983–84	First Division	37	10	1	0	6	1	6 (Note: Appearances in European Cup Winners' Cup)	1	1 (Note: Appearance in FA Charity Shield)	0	51	12
Manchester United	1984–85	First Division	27	9	6	4	1	0	5	0	—		39	13
Manchester United	1985–86	First Division	37	4	5	1	4	2	0	0	5 (Note: One appearance in FA Charity Shield, four appearances and one goal in Football League Super Cup)	1	51	8
Manchester United	1986–87	First Division	31	8	2	1	4	1	—		—		37	10
Manchester United	1987–88	First Division	27	7	3	1	5	2	—		—		35	10
Manchester United	1988–89	First Division	6	0	0	0	0	0	—		0	0	6	0
Manchester United	Total		206	47	24	10	29	9	13	1	6	1	278	68
Everton	1989–90	First Division	27	9	6	3	2	1	—		—		35	13
Everton	1990–91	First Division	2	0	0	0	0	0	—		0	0	2	0
Everton	Total		29	9	6	3	2	1	0	0	0	0	37	13
Career total			235	56	30	13	31	10	13	1	6	1	315	81

=== International ===
Appearances and goals by national team and year
National team	Year	Apps	Goals
Northern Ireland	1982	7	0
Northern Ireland	1983	5	3
Northern Ireland	1984	6	2
Northern Ireland	1985	5	2
Northern Ireland	1986	7	1
Northern Ireland	1987	4	0
Northern Ireland	1988	2	0
Northern Ireland	1989	2	1
Total		38	9

Scores and results list Northern Ireland's goal tally first, score column indicates score after each Whiteside goal.

List of international goals scored by Norman Whiteside
No.	Date	Venue	Opponent	Score	Result	Competition
1	21 September 1983	Belfast, Northern Ireland	Austria	2–0	3–1	UEFA Euro 1984 qualifying
2	16 November 1983	Hamburg, West Germany	West Germany	1–0	1–0	UEFA Euro 1984 qualifying
3	13 December 1983	Belfast, Northern Ireland	Scotland	1–0	2–0	1983–84 British Home Championship
4	12 September 1984	Belfast, Northern Ireland	Romania	2–1	3–2	1986 FIFA World Cup qualification
5	16 October 1984	Belfast, Northern Ireland	Israel	1–0	3–0	Friendly
6	1 May 1985	Belfast, Northern Ireland	Turkey	1–0	2–0	1986 FIFA World Cup qualification
7	1 May 1985	Belfast, Northern Ireland	Turkey	2–0	2–0	1986 FIFA World Cup qualification
8	3 June 1986	Guadalajara, Mexico	Algeria	1–0	1–1	1986 FIFA World Cup
9	6 September 1989	Belfast, Northern Ireland	Hungary	1–2	1–2	1990 FIFA World Cup qualification

== Honours ==
Manchester United

- FA Cup: 1982–83, 1984–85
- FA Charity Shield: 1983
- Football League Cup runner-up: 1982–83

Northern Ireland

- British Home Championship: 1983–84
