= Jeff Wealands =

English footballer

Personal information
- Full name: Jeffrey Andrew Wealands
- Date of birth: 26 August 1951 (age 75)
- Place of birth: Darlington, England
- Height: 6 ft 1/2 in (1.84 m)
- Position: Goalkeeper

Youth career
- Star Juniors
- Darlington Cleveland Bridge
- 1968: Wolverhampton Wanderers

Senior career*
Years	Team	Apps	(Gls)
1968–1970	Wolverhampton Wanderers	0	(0)
1970	→ Northampton Town (loan)	0	(0)
1970–1972	Darlington	28	(0)
1972–1979	Hull City	240	(0)
1979–1983	Birmingham City	102	(0)
1983	→ Manchester United (loan)	5	(0)
1983–1985	Manchester United	2	(0)
1984	→ Oldham Athletic (loan)	10	(0)
1984–1985	→ Preston North End (loan)	4	(0)
1985–1987	Altrincham	75	(0)
1987–1988	Barrow		
1988–1992	Altrincham	127	(0)
Total		593	(0)
- * Club domestic league appearances and goals

Jeffrey Andrew Wealands (born 26 August 1951) is an English former footballer who played as a goalkeeper. He made nearly 400 appearances in the Football League, and over 200 more in the Conference. He played in the Altrincham team which knocked his former club, Birmingham City of the First Division, out of the FA Cup in 1986, only the second time a non-league club has eliminated a top-flight club on their own ground.

== Biography ==
Wealands was born in Darlington, County Durham. As a boy he played for Star Juniors, moving on to Darlington Cleveland Bridge. At 17 he signed professional forms for Wolverhampton Wanderers, but was unable to break through to the first team, and in 1970 moved back home to join Darlington in the Fourth Division. After 18 months he was transferred to Second Division side Hull City. He established himself as first choice goalkeeper a year later, and starting from the 1973–74 season missed only three games in four years. Injury restricted his appearances in the next season, when Hull were relegated to the Third Division.

In July 1979 Wealands joined Birmingham City, then in the Second Division, for a fee of £30,000. His first season at Birmingham saw them promoted to the First Division. He kept 16 clean sheets and was chosen Player of the Year. He kept his place as first choice goalkeeper, despite competition from promising youngster Tony Coton, and played more than 100 games before a difference of views with new manager Ron Saunders saw him out of contention. He joined Manchester United as cover for Gary Bailey, initially on loan, in 1983, and was an unused substitute in the 1983 FA Charity Shield, but a recurring back injury restricted his chances. Periods on loan at Oldham Athletic and Preston North End preceded his leaving the Football League altogether to join Altrincham in the Alliance Premier League (soon to be renamed the Football Conference).

Wealands' first season at Altrincham brought considerable success, culminating in a trip to Wembley where the club beat Runcorn 1–0 to win the 1985–86 FA Trophy. In that season's FA Cup, Altrincham reached the Third Round and were drawn away to Birmingham City, still in the First Division and still managed by Saunders. Wealands helped his new club become only the second non-league team to eliminate top-flight opponents on their own ground when they won 2–1, a result which gave the player considerable personal satisfaction, and which was followed two days later by Saunders' resignation. The next season Wealands helped the club reach the final of the Cheshire Senior Cup. He then had a spell at Barrow before returning to Altrincham in 1988. The last of his 273 games in all competitions for the club was in 1992, by which time he was 41 years old.

After finally retiring from playing, he served briefly on the board of Altrincham, and has coached goalkeepers at Bury. In his early days with Altrincham he worked in insurance, and later was involved with a property development company.

== Honours ==
=== Club ===
Hull City

- Watney Cup runner-up: 1973

Birmingham City

- Football League Second Division promotion: 1979–80

Manchester United

- FA Charity Shield winners: 1983

Altrincham

- FA Trophy winners: 1985–86
- Cheshire Senior Cup runners up: 1986–87

=== Individual ===
- Birmingham City F.C. Player of the Year: 1979–80
