= Nicky Wood =

English footballer

Personal information
- Full name: Nicholas Anthony Wood
- Date of birth: 6 January 1966 (age 60)
- Place of birth: Oldham, Lancashire
- Height: 5 ft 11 in (1.80 m)
- Position: Forward

Senior career*
Years	Team	Apps	(Gls)
1985–1987	Manchester United	3	(0)
- * Club domestic league appearances and goals

Nicholas Anthony Wood (born 6 January 1966) is an English former professional footballer who played as a forward. Born in Oldham, Lancashire, he played for Manchester United between 1985 and 1987. He made three first-team appearances, but was forced to retire from the game at the age of 22, having sustained a back injury.
