= Billy Garton =

English footballer (born 1965)

Personal information
- Full name: William Francis Garton
- Date of birth: 15 March 1965 (age 61)
- Place of birth: Salford, England
- Height: 5 ft 11 in (1.80 m)
- Position: Centre-back

Team information
- Current team: San Diego Surf (youth coach)

Senior career*
Years	Team	Apps	(Gls)
1984–1990	Manchester United	41	(0)
1986	→ Birmingham City (loan)	5	(0)
1992–1993	Salford City		
1993–1994	Witton Albion		
1994–1998	Hyde United	100	(1)
2000–2001	Salford City		

Managerial career
- 1992–1993: Salford City
- * Club domestic league appearances and goals

William Francis Garton (born 15 March 1965) is an English football coach and former professional player who played as a centre-back, most notably for Manchester United and Birmingham City. He works as a youth coach for San Diego Surf SC in the United States.

== Career ==
Garton made his Manchester United debut in 1984, and played 51 games over the next five years. The first half of his career was marred by injury, and he was forced to retire from full-time football in May 1990 after being diagnosed with chronic fatigue syndrome. He later returned to playing at non-league level, before becoming manager of Salford City, and taught in local schools during the 1990s.

Garton immigrated to San Diego, California, in 2001 and co-founded the Carmel Valley Manchester youth soccer club. He continued his involvement with youth soccer in the San Diego area with clubs including the Del Mar Carmel Valley Sharks, Albion SC and San Diego Surf SC.
