= John Gidman =

English footballer

Personal information
- Date of birth: 10 January 1954 (age 72)
- Place of birth: Liverpool, England
- Height: 5 ft 11 in (1.80 m)
- Position: Right-back

Youth career
- 1970–1971: Liverpool
- 1971–1972: Aston Villa

Senior career*
Years	Team	Apps	(Gls)
1972–1979	Aston Villa	197	(9)
1979–1981	Everton	64	(2)
1981–1986	Manchester United	95	(4)
1986–1988	Manchester City	53	(1)
1988–1989	Stoke City	10	(0)
1989	Darlington	13	(1)
Total		432	(17)

International career
1972	England Youth	5	(0)
1974–1976	England U23	4	(0)
1977	England	1	(0)
1978	England B	2	(0)
- * Club domestic league appearances and goals

John Gidman (born 10 January 1954) is an English former footballer who played for Aston Villa, Everton, Manchester United, Manchester City, Stoke City and Darlington. Gidman was a product of the Liverpool and Aston Villa youth systems. He represented England at youth, under-23, B international and senior levels.

== Career ==
Gidman played for the Liverpool youth team without ever playing for their first team, before he joined Aston Villa in 1971, playing in his first season in their youth side that won the 1972 FA Youth Cup, beating his former side Liverpool in the final. He was later a member of the 1977 League Cup winning side. In August 1979 Gidman demanded better terms, despite two years remaining on his existing contract; Ron Saunders agreed that he could leave the club. He was subsequently signed by Everton for £650,000 in a deal which saw midfielder Pat Heard move the other way at a valuation of £100,000.

Gidman then became Manchester United's new manager Ron Atkinson's first signing as he moved to United in 1981 as part of a £450,000 swap deal, with Mickey Thomas moving to Everton. He helped United win the FA Cup in 1985. After scoring 4 goals in 120 appearances for United (including 4 substitute appearances), he left the club for rivals Manchester City in 1986. During his two seasons at City, the club was relegated to the Second Division. He then moved to Stoke City and Darlington, and retired after seeing his final club relegated to the Football Conference in 1989.

Gidman made his solitary appearance for England in March 1977 against Luxembourg.

== Career statistics ==
Appearances and goals by club, season and competition
Club	Season	League			FA Cup		League Cup		Other^{[A]}		Total	
Club	Season	Division	Apps	Goals	Apps	Goals	Apps	Goals	Apps	Goals	Apps	Goals
Aston Villa	1972–73	Second Division	13	0	0	0	3	0	0	0	16	0
Aston Villa	1973–74	Second Division	30	0	4	0	0	0	0	0	34	0
Aston Villa	1974–75	Second Division	14	1	0	0	3	0	0	0	17	1
Aston Villa	1975–76	First Division	39	0	2	0	1	0	2	0	44	0
Aston Villa	1976–77	First Division	27	4	4	0	10	0	0	0	41	4
Aston Villa	1977–78	First Division	34	1	1	0	2	0	7	0	44	1
Aston Villa	1978–79	First Division	36	3	1	0	3	0	0	0	40	3
Aston Villa	1979–80	First Division	4	0	0	0	3	0	0	0	7	0
Aston Villa	Total		197	9	12	0	25	0	9	0	243	9
Everton	1979–80	First Division	29	1	6	0	0	0	0	0	35	1
Everton	1980–81	First Division	35	1	5	0	3	1	0	0	43	2
Everton	Total		64	2	11	0	3	1	0	0	78	3
Manchester United	1981–82	First Division	37	1	1	0	2	0	0	0	40	1
Manchester United	1982–83	First Division	3	0	0	0	0	0	0	0	3	0
Manchester United	1983–84	First Division	4	0	0	0	1	0	3	0	8	0
Manchester United	1984–85	First Division	27	3	6	0	1	0	7	0	41	3
Manchester United	1985–86	First Division	24	0	2	0	1	0	4	0	31	0
Manchester United	Total		95	4	9	0	5	0	14	0	123	4
Manchester City	1986–87	First Division	22	0	1	0	1	0	2	0	26	0
Manchester City	1987–88	Second Division	31	1	7	1	5	1	2	0	45	0
Manchester City	Total		53	1	8	1	6	1	4	0	71	0
Stoke City	1988–89	Second Division	10	0	0	0	2	0	1	0	13	0
Darlington	1988–89	Fourth Division	13	1	0	0	0	0	0	0	13	1
Career total			432	17	40	1	41	2	28	0	541	20

A. The "Other" column constitutes appearances and goals in the FA Charity Shield, Full Members' Cup, Screen Sport Super Cup, UEFA Cup and UEFA Cup Winners' Cup.

=== International ===
National team	Year	Apps	Goals
England	1977	1	0
Total		1	0

== Honours ==
Aston Villa

- Football League Cup: 1976–77

Manchester United

- FA Cup: 1984–85
