= Graeme Hogg =

Scottish footballer

Personal information
- Full name: Graeme James Hogg
- Date of birth: 17 June 1964 (age 62)
- Place of birth: Aberdeen, Scotland
- Height: 6 ft 1 in (1.85 m)
- Position: Centre-back

Youth career
- Manchester United

Senior career*
Years	Team	Apps	(Gls)
1984–1988	Manchester United	83	(1)
1987	→ West Bromwich Albion (loan)	7	(0)
1988–1991	Portsmouth	100	(2)
1991–1995	Heart of Midlothian	57	(3)
1995–1998	Notts County	66	(0)
1998	Brentford	25	(3)
1998–1999	Linlithgow Rose		

International career
1984–1985	Scotland U21	4	(0)
- * Club domestic league appearances and goals

Graeme James Hogg (born 17 June 1964) is a Scottish former footballer who played as a defender.

== Career ==
He began his career with Manchester United in 1984 and went on to play 83 league games for the club before joining Portsmouth in 1988. During his time at Old Trafford, United were FA Cup winners in 1985, but Hogg was not part of the squad that beat Everton 1–0 at Wembley.

When he played for Heart of Midlothian, his nose was broken when team captain Craig Levein punched him after an on-field dispute during a pre-season friendly match.

He also played for West Bromwich Albion, Notts County (where he won the Anglo-Italian Cup) and Brentford.

Hogg finished his career with Linlithgow Rose between 1998 and 1999.

Hogg made four appearances for the Scotland under-21s team between 1984 and 1985.
