= Gary Bailey =

English footballer (born 1958)

Personal information
- Full name: Gary Richard Bailey
- Date of birth: 9 August 1958 (age 68)
- Place of birth: Ipswich, England
- Height: 6 ft 1 in (1.85 m)
- Position: Goalkeeper

Senior career*
Years	Team	Apps	(Gls)
1975	Cape Town City	0	(0)
1976–1979	Wits University		
1978–1987	Manchester United	294	(0)
1988–1990	Kaizer Chiefs		

International career
1979–1984	England U21	14	(0)
1980	England B	2	(0)
1985	England	2	(0)
- * Club domestic league appearances and goals

Gary Richard Bailey (born 9 August 1958) is a former footballer who made nearly 300 appearances in the Football League playing as a goalkeeper for Manchester United. Born in Ipswich, Suffolk, he grew up in South Africa, but went on to be capped twice for England.

== Playing career ==
Although born in Ipswich, England, Bailey grew up in South Africa and started his career with Wits University in Johannesburg. In the late 1970s, Bailey paid his own fare to Manchester for a trial with Manchester United. He made his debut against Ipswich Town (who his father, Roy Bailey, had played for, and also his birthplace), on 18 November 1978. He went on to play 294 games for the Red Devils between 1978 and 1987.

He established himself as United goalkeeper in the late 1970s following the retirement of Alex Stepney. He was considered to be one of the best goalkeepers in England in the early to mid-1980s. During his time with Manchester United, Bailey won FA Cup medals in 1983 and 1985. He played under three United managers: Dave Sexton, Ron Atkinson, and Alex Ferguson.

He represented the England national team twice at senior level, but was unable to establish himself in the first XI due to the form of the more-experienced Peter Shilton and Ray Clemence. He was first capped against the Republic of Ireland on 26 March 1985, won by England 2–1, with his other international appearance coming on 9 June that year in a 1–0 loss against Mexico.

However, he developed a serious knee injury during training at the 1986 FIFA World Cup and missed most of the 1986–87 season, after which he retired and returned to South Africa.

He subsequently resumed his career with Kaizer Chiefs in 1988, winning a quadruple in 1989 before retiring in 1990.

Peter Schmeichel said on BBC Match of the Day 3 that Gary Bailey was his favourite goalkeeper of all time and he idolised him as a youngster growing up in Denmark.

== Post-playing career ==
After retiring in England, Gary Bailey returned to South Africa, and after resting his knee, decided to return to play for glamour club Kaizer Chiefs with whom he won the league in 1989 and amassed five trophies in two years.

He retired for a final time, and became a radio presenter on Talk Radio 702. He worked as a TV analyst and football presenter at SuperSport, where he spent 25 years as the face of English football to the continent of Africa.

At the same time as living the dream of playing professional football, Gary completed a BSc in physics at Manchester Polytechnic (now Manchester Metropolitan University). Whilst working full-time at SuperSport, he managed to complete an MBA from Henley in Oxford.

He was an ambassador in South Africa's successful bid to host the 2010 FIFA World Cup.

Besides being a TV soccer expert, he was also a top keynote speaker on the subject of "Success under Pressure" and travelled the world speaking to many of the top companies such as Microsoft, IBM, Nike, Coca-Cola, Mercedes Benz and many more. He was recognised for his speaking success by being inducted into the Speakers Hall of Fame in 2010.

He has written two books – Success under Pressure, with the foreword written by former manager Alex Ferguson, and a personal book to help society on divorce called "Putting the Kids first".

He currently works for BeIN sports TV in Miami, Florida, covering Spanish and French football, and also does commentary for USL games (USA 2nd division).

As of 2023, Bailey is serving as a broadcast analyst for the National Women's Soccer League.

== Personal life ==
He is the son of former Ipswich Town goalkeeper Roy Bailey.

On returning to South Africa in 1987, Bailey married Kate Saunders in 1990 and had three children, Lara, Jenna and Ross. The couple divorced in 2006.

He met his current wife Michelle McLean (Miss Universe 1992) in 2010, married in March 2013, and then emigrated in December 2013 to USA and currently lives on Miami Beach in Florida.

== Honours ==
Manchester United

- FA Cup: 1982–83, 1984–85; runner-up: 1978–79
- FA Charity Shield: 1983
- Football League Cup runner-up: 1982–83

Kaizer Chiefs

- National Soccer League: 1989
- BP Top 8: 1989
- JPS Knockout: 1989
- Charity Spectacular: 1989
- Ohlsson's Challenge Cup: 1989

England

- UEFA European Under-21 Championship: 1984
