= Mike Duxbury =

English footballer (born 1959)

Personal information
- Full name: Michael Duxbury
- Date of birth: 1 September 1959 (age 67)
- Place of birth: Accrington, Lancashire, England
- Height: 1.75 m (5 ft 9 in)
- Position: Full back

Youth career
- ?–1975: Everton
- 1975–1976: Manchester United

Senior career*
Years	Team	Apps	(Gls)
1976–1990	Manchester United	299	(6)
1990–1992	Blackburn Rovers	27	(0)
1992–1994	Bradford City	65	(0)
1994–1996	Golden		
Total		391	(6)

International career
1980–1982	England U21	7	(1)
1983–1984	England	10	(0)
- * Club domestic league appearances and goals

Michael Duxbury (born 1 September 1959) is a former footballer who won ten caps for England. At club level, he played in the Football League for Manchester United, Blackburn Rovers and Bradford City, and in the Hong Kong First Division League for Golden.

== Career ==
Born in Accrington, Lancashire, Duxbury began his career as a right back with Everton, but he signed for Manchester United as a schoolboy in 1975. He signed trainee forms in July 1976, and then went professional three months later. Duxbury made his Manchester United debut on 23 August 1980, coming on as a substitute for Kevin Moran against Birmingham City. Duxbury became a semi-regular in the first team over the next couple of seasons, although – due to the form of first-choice full backs John Gidman and Arthur Albiston – he spent most of his time playing at centre-back; it was not until towards the end of the 1981–82 season that Duxbury began to play in his favoured right back position. The following season, he won his first FA Cup medal with Manchester United, playing in both matches of the 1983 final against Brighton & Hove Albion. Another FA Cup medal followed in 1985, after Duxbury came on as a substitute for Arthur Albiston. He continued at Manchester United for another five years, but he found his first-team opportunities increasingly limited as he began to play more reserve matches. After being left out of the side for the 1990 FA Cup final against Crystal Palace, Duxbury left United for Blackburn Rovers for free at the end of the season.

He later played for Bradford City and for Golden FC in Hong Kong before retiring in 1994. Duxbury was capped ten times by England, making his debut in November 1983 and earning his last cap in October 1984. While in Hong Kong, he played for his club's Select XI against England in their warm-up games for Euro 1996.

Since his retirement from playing, Duxbury moved into the coaching side of the game. He worked with the Manchester United Soccer Schools programme in Hong Kong and Dubai, and coached football and taught physical education in the junior department of independent school Bolton School.

== Honours ==
Manchester United

- FA Cup: 1982–83, 1984–85
- Football League Cup runner-up: 1982–83
