= Remi Moses =

English footballer

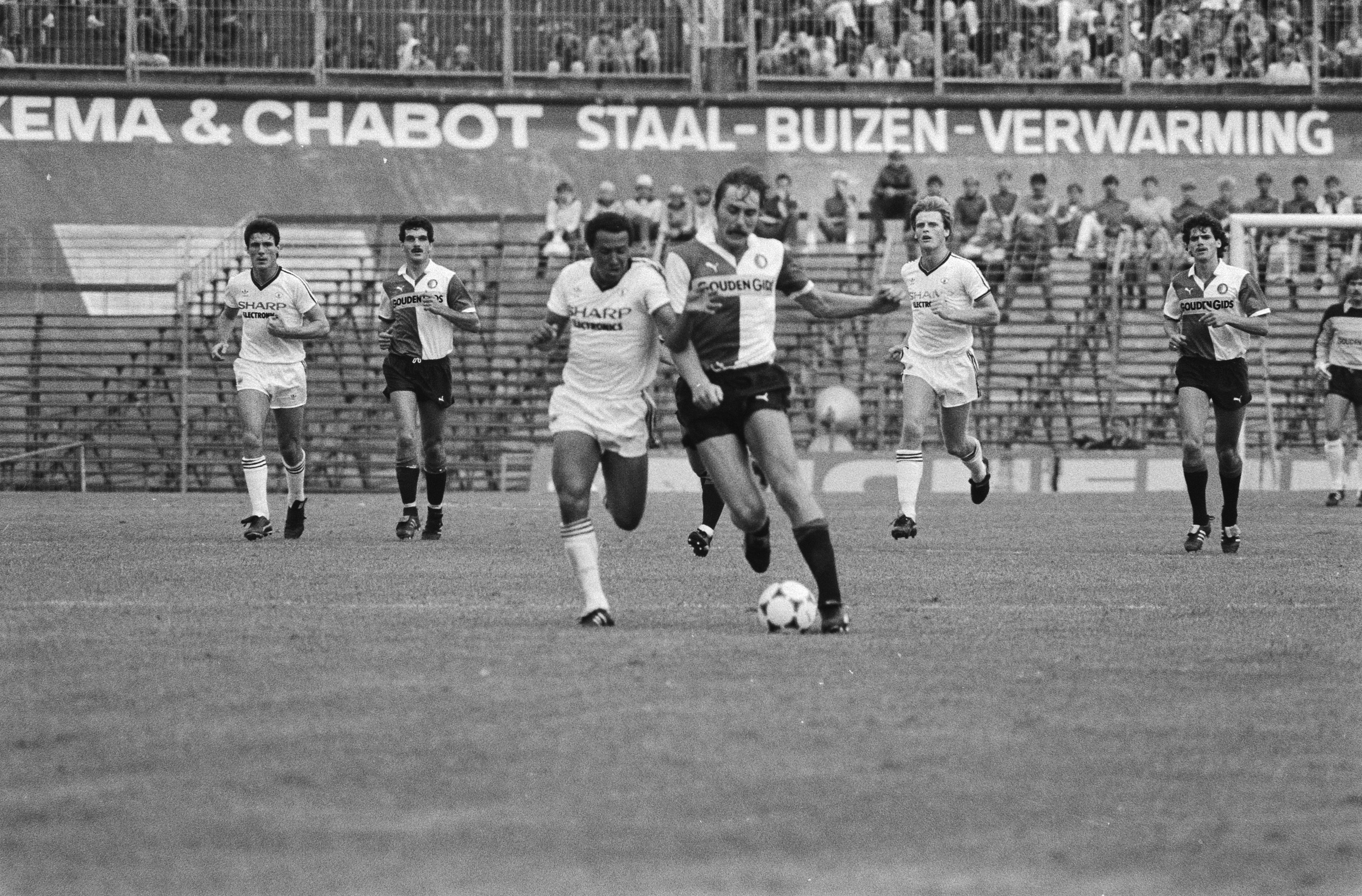
- Moses (foreground) playing for Manchester United in 1983

Personal information
- Full name: Remi Mark Moses
- Date of birth: 14 November 1960 (age 65)
- Place of birth: Miles Platting, Manchester, England
- Height: 1.68 m (5 ft 6 in)
- Position: Midfielder

Youth career
- West Bromwich Albion

Senior career*
Years	Team	Apps	(Gls)
1979–1981	West Bromwich Albion	63	(5)
1981–1989	Manchester United	150	(7)
Total		213	(12)

International career
1980–1981	England U21	8	(0)
- * Club domestic league appearances and goals

Remi Mark Moses (born 14 November 1960) is an English former professional footballer who played as a midfielder.

== Career ==
Moses broke into the first team at West Bromwich Albion under the management of Ron Atkinson in the late 1970s, when Albion were enjoying a strong run of form which saw them finish in the top five for all but one season between 1977 and 1981, and also reached a UEFA Cup quarter-final.

Whilst a West Bromwich Albion player he played in a benefit match for Len Cantello, that saw a team of white players play against a team of black players.

In the autumn of 1981, Moses was transferred from West Bromwich Albion to Manchester United for £500,000, arriving at Old Trafford a month before Bryan Robson who went for a club record £1.5 million.

He made his United debut on 19 September 1981 against Swansea City. He scored his first goal for United in the same season, and in doing so became the first black player to score for the club.

Moses was a key midfielder for United during the 1980s, but suffered a succession of serious injuries. He missed the FA Cup final triumphs of 1983 due to suspension and 1985 due to injury, and played his last game for the club in the 1987–88 season.

He was on the verge of being capped for the England team in 1985 before an injury ruled him out of action, causing him to miss most of the 1985–86 season. He also faced competition from Norman Whiteside for a place in central midfield, after Whiteside was converted from a striker to a midfielder.

Injuries gradually forced him out of the team and he finally announced his retirement from playing in the 1988–89 season at the age of just 28.

== Personal life ==
In 2000, Moses was working as a property dealer in Alkrington, Greater Manchester, and in his spare time, coaching the Manchester Warriors under-20 inline skating side, which had just won the GB Inline Hockey League and "every other trophy going".

== Honours ==
Manchester United

- Football League Cup runner-up: 1982–83
