= 1973–74 Manchester United F.C. season =

English football club season

Manchester United
1973–74 season
- Chairman: Louis Edwards
- Manager: Tommy Docherty
- First Division: 21st (relegated)
- FA Cup: Fourth Round
- League Cup: Second Round
- Top goalscorer: League: Sammy McIlroy (6); All: Lou Macari (6); Sammy McIlroy (6)
- Highest home attendance: 60,025 vs Leeds United (9 February 1974)
- Lowest home attendance: 23,906 vs Middlesbrough (8 October 1973)
- Average home league attendance: 41,251
Home colours	Away colours	Third colours

The 1973–74 season was Manchester United's 72nd season in the Football League, and their 29th consecutive season in the top division of English football. It was the first full season in charge for manager Tommy Docherty, who had been appointed the previous December following the dismissal of Frank O'Farrell. Only six seasons after winning the European Cup, United were relegated, meaning that they would be a Second Division club for the first time since 1938.

Having been persuaded to return to the team after walking out during the previous season, the troubled George Best briefly returned to the side, but played his last game for the club on New Year's Day, and his contract was cancelled the following season after more than a decade at Old Trafford.

Docherty took the unusual step of appointing goalkeeper Alex Stepney as the team's penalty taker. After 12 games, Stepney had converted two penalties, which made him the club's joint top scorer, a position he held for ten matches.

United began the season with two victories in their first three games, but then recorded only four wins in twenty League games between September and March. A late-season run of victories raised the prospect of survival, but United stumbled as the season drew to an end. On the last full day of the season, United could survive only by winning their home game against Manchester City and then their rearranged game at Stoke City, provided that points were dropped by other relegation candidates, all of which had only one game remaining. In the event, United lost both games whilst their rivals' results meant that they would have been relegated anyway.

The scorer of what proved to be the winning goal for Manchester City in United's penultimate game was former United player Denis Law, who scored with a back-heel in the 81st minute. He did not celebrate the goal, and was substituted shortly afterwards. The goal triggered a series of pitch invasions by Manchester United fans, perhaps hoping to get the match replayed, that forced the referee to abandon the game in the 85th minute. After a review, the Football League decided that the result should stand.

This was the season in which the Football League increased the number of relegation places from two to three, and it is sometimes incorrectly stated that by scoring that goal Law "relegated" United. In fact, it was Birmingham City's win over Norwich City and West Ham United's point against Liverpool that sealed United's fate, since, with a win still worth only two points, United could not have caught Birmingham and West Ham even if they had won their last two fixtures. However, City's victory and Southampton's win at Everton meant that United finished in 21st place, and would still have been relegated under the old system.

Already relegated, United then lost their last game of the season, against sixth-placed Stoke City.

In spite of the relegation to the Second Division, the club's directors decided not to sack Docherty, placing their confidence in him to restore the club's First Division status at the first attempt.

== First Division ==
Date	Opponents	H / A	Result F–A	Scorers	Attendance
25 August 1973	Arsenal	A	0–3		51,501
29 August 1973	Stoke City	H	1–0	James	43,614
1 September 1973	Queens Park Rangers	H	2–1	Holton, McIlroy	44,156
5 September 1973	Leicester City	A	0–1		29,152
8 September 1973	Ipswich Town	A	1–2	Anderson	22,023
12 September 1973	Leicester City	H	1–2	Stepney (pen.)	40,793
15 September 1973	West Ham United	H	3–1	Kidd (2), Storey-Moore	44,757
22 September 1973	Leeds United	A	0–0		47,058
29 September 1973	Liverpool	H	0–0		53,882
6 October 1973	Wolverhampton Wanderers	A	1–2	McIlroy	32,962
13 October 1973	Derby County	H	0–1		43,724
20 October 1973	Birmingham City	H	1–0	Stepney (pen.)	48,937
27 October 1973	Burnley	A	0–0		31,976
3 November 1973	Chelsea	H	2–2	Greenhoff, Young	48,036
10 November 1973	Tottenham Hotspur	A	1–2	Best	42,756
17 November 1973	Newcastle United	A	2–3	Graham, Macari	41,768
24 November 1973	Norwich City	H	0–0		36,338
8 December 1973	Southampton	H	0–0		31,648
15 December 1973	Coventry City	H	2–3	Best, Morgan	28,589
22 December 1973	Liverpool	A	0–2		40,420
26 December 1973	Sheffield United	H	1–2	Macari	38,653
29 December 1973	Ipswich Town	H	2–0	Macari, McIlroy	36,365
1 January 1974	Queens Park Rangers	A	0–3		32,339
12 January 1974	West Ham United	A	1–2	McIlroy	34,147
19 January 1974	Arsenal	H	1–1	James	38,589
2 February 1974	Coventry City	A	0–1		25,313
9 February 1974	Leeds United	H	0–2		60,025
16 February 1974	Derby County	A	2–2	Greenhoff, Houston	29,987
23 February 1974	Wolverhampton Wanderers	H	0–0		39,260
2 March 1974	Sheffield United	A	1–0	Macari	29,203
13 March 1974	Manchester City	A	0–0		51,331
16 March 1974	Birmingham City	A	0–1		37,768
23 March 1974	Tottenham Hotspur	H	0–1		36,278
30 March 1974	Chelsea	A	3–1	Daly, McIlroy, Morgan	29,602
3 April 1974	Burnley	H	3–3	Forsyth, Holton, McIlroy	33,336
6 April 1974	Norwich City	A	2–0	Greenhoff, Macari	28,223
13 April 1974	Newcastle United	H	1–0	McCalliog	44,751
15 April 1974	Everton	H	3–0	McCalliog (2), Houston	48,424
20 April 1974	Southampton	A	1–1	McCalliog	30,789
23 April 1974	Everton	A	0–1		46,093
27 April 1974	Manchester City	H	0–1		56,996
29 April 1974	Stoke City	A	0–1		27,392

Pos	Team	Pld	W	D	L	GF	GA	GAv	Pts	Qualification or relegation
18	West Ham United	42	11	15	16	55	60	0.917	37	
19	Birmingham City	42	12	13	17	52	64	0.813	37	
20	Southampton (R)	42	11	14	17	47	68	0.691	36	Relegation to the Second Division
21	Manchester United (R)	42	10	12	20	38	48	0.792	32	Relegation to the Second Division
22	Norwich City (R)	42	7	15	20	37	62	0.597	29	Relegation to the Second Division

Source: World Football
Rules for classification: 1) Points; 2) Goal average; 3) Goals scored
(R) Relegated

== FA Cup ==
Date	Round	Opponents	H / A	Result F–A	Scorers	Attendance
5 January 1974	Round 3	Plymouth Argyle	H	1–0	Macari	31,810
26 January 1974	Round 4	Ipswich Town	H	0–1		37,177

== League Cup ==
Date	Round	Opponents	H / A	Result F–A	Scorers	Attendance
8 October 1973	Round 2	Middlesbrough	H	0–1		23,906

== Squad statistics ==
Pos.	Name	League		FA Cup		League Cup		Total	
Pos.	Name	Apps	Goals	Apps	Goals	Apps	Goals	Apps	Goals
GK	(England) Alex Stepney	42	2	2	0	1	0	45	2
DF	(Scotland) Martin Buchan	42	0	2	0	1	0	45	0
DF	(Scotland) Alex Forsyth	18(1)	1	2	0	0	0	20(1)	0
DF	(England) Brian Greenhoff	36	3	2	0	1	0	39	3
DF	(Wales) Clive Griffiths	7	0	0	0	0	0	7	0
DF	(Scotland) Jim Holton	34	2	2	0	1	0	37	2
DF	(Scotland) Stewart Houston	20	2	0	0	0	0	20	2
DF	(England) Steve James	21	2	1	0	1	0	23	2
DF	(England) David Sadler	2(1)	0	0	0	0	0	2(1)	0
DF	(England) Arnie Sidebottom	2	0	0	0	0	0	2	0
DF	(England) Tony Young	29	1	2	0	1	0	32	1
MF	(Northern Ireland) George Best	12	2	0	0	0	0	12	2
MF	(England) Paul Bielby	2(2)	0	0	0	0	0	2(2)	0
MF	(Republic of Ireland) Gerry Daly	14(2)	1	0	0	1	0	15(2)	1
MF	(Scotland) George Graham	23(1)	1	1	0	1	0	25(1)	0
MF	(Republic of Ireland) Mick Martin	12(4)	0	2	0	0	0	14(4)	0
MF	(Scotland) Jim McCalliog	11	4	0	0	0	0	11	4
MF	(Northern Ireland) Sammy McIlroy	24(5)	6	1(1)	0	0	0	25(6)	6
FW	(Northern Ireland) Trevor Anderson	11(1)	1	0	0	0	0	11(1)	1
FW	(Scotland) George Buchan	0(3)	0	0	0	0(1)	0	0(4)	0
FW	(England) Peter Fletcher	2(3)	0	0	0	0	0	2(3)	0
FW	(England) Brian Kidd	21	2	1(1)	0	1	0	23(1)	2
FW	(Scotland) Lou Macari	34(1)	5	2	1	1	0	37(1)	6
FW	(Scotland) Willie Morgan	41	2	2	0	1	0	44	2
FW	(England) Ian Storey-Moore	2	1	0	0	0	0	2	1
–	Own goals	–	0	–	0	–	0	–	0
