= 1974–75 Manchester United F.C. season =

English football club season

Manchester United
1974–75 season
- Chairman: Louis Edwards
- Manager: Tommy Docherty
- Second Division: 1st (promoted)
- FA Cup: Third Round
- League Cup: Semi-finals
- Top goalscorer: League: Stuart Pearson (17); All: Lou Macari (18); Stuart Pearson (18)
- Highest home attendance: 60,585 vs Sunderland (30 November 1974)
- Lowest home attendance: 21,616 vs Charlton Athletic (11 September 1974)
- Average home league attendance: 47,781
| Home colours | Away colours | Third colours |

The 1974–75 season was Manchester United's 73rd season in the Football League, and their first as a Second Division team since 1937–38, following relegation from the First Division at the end of the previous season.

The board of directors had kept faith in manager Tommy Docherty despite United's relegation, and he delivered an instant return to the First Division by guiding United to the Second Division title. Despite being a second division side, their average home attendance of 47,781 was still the highest in the country that season. To date, this is the last United season spent outside of English football's top flight.

== Second Division ==
| Date | Opponents | H / A | Result F–A | Scorers | Attendance |
|---|---|---|---|---|---|
| 17 August 1974 | Orient | A | 2–0 | Morgan, Houston | 17,772 |
| 24 August 1974 | Millwall | H | 4–0 | Daly (3; 2 pen.), Pearson | 44,756 |
| 28 August 1974 | Portsmouth | H | 2–1 | Daly (pen.), McIlroy | 42,547 |
| 31 August 1974 | Cardiff City | A | 1–0 | Daly (pen.) | 22,344 |
| 7 September 1974 | Nottingham Forest | H | 2–2 | Greenhoff, McIlroy | 40,671 |
| 14 September 1974 | West Bromwich Albion | A | 1–1 | Pearson | 28,666 |
| 16 September 1974 | Millwall | A | 1–0 | Daly (pen.) | 16,988 |
| 21 September 1974 | Bristol Rovers | H | 2–0 | Greenhoff, Prince (o.g.) | 42,948 |
| 25 September 1974 | Bolton Wanderers | H | 3–0 | Macari, Houston, McAllister (o.g.) | 47,084 |
| 28 September 1974 | Norwich City | A | 0–2 | | 24,586 |
| 5 October 1974 | Fulham | A | 2–1 | Pearson (2) | 25,513 |
| 12 October 1974 | Notts County | H | 1–0 | McIlroy | 46,565 |
| 15 October 1974 | Portsmouth | A | 0–0 | | 25,608 |
| 19 October 1974 | Blackpool | A | 3–0 | Forsyth, Macari, McCalliog | 25,370 |
| 26 October 1974 | Southampton | H | 1–0 | Pearson | 48,724 |
| 2 November 1974 | Oxford United | H | 4–0 | Pearson (3), Macari | 41,909 |
| 9 November 1974 | Bristol City | A | 0–1 | | 28,104 |
| 16 November 1974 | Aston Villa | H | 2–1 | Daly (2; 1 pen.) | 55,615 |
| 23 November 1974 | Hull City | A | 0–2 | | 23,287 |
| 30 November 1974 | Sunderland | H | 3–2 | Pearson, Morgan, McIlroy | 60,585 |
| 7 December 1974 | Sheffield Wednesday | A | 4–4 | Houston, Macari (2), Pearson | 35,230 |
| 14 December 1974 | Orient | H | 0–0 | | 41,200 |
| 21 December 1974 | York City | A | 1–0 | Pearson | 15,314 |
| 26 December 1974 | West Bromwich Albion | H | 2–1 | McIlroy, Daly (pen.) | 51,104 |
| 28 December 1974 | Oldham Athletic | A | 0–1 | | 26,356 |
| 11 January 1975 | Sheffield Wednesday | H | 2–0 | McCalliog (2; 1 pen.) | 45,662 |
| 18 January 1975 | Sunderland | A | 0–0 | | 45,976 |
| 1 February 1975 | Bristol City | H | 0–1 | | 47,118 |
| 8 February 1975 | Oxford United | A | 0–1 | | 15,959 |
| 15 February 1975 | Hull City | H | 2–0 | Houston, Pearson | 44,712 |
| 22 February 1975 | Aston Villa | A | 0–2 | | 40,353 |
| 1 March 1975 | Cardiff City | H | 4–0 | Houston, Pearson, McIlroy, Macari | 43,601 |
| 8 March 1975 | Bolton Wanderers | A | 1–0 | Pearson | 38,152 |
| 15 March 1975 | Norwich City | H | 1–1 | Pearson | 56,202 |
| 22 March 1975 | Nottingham Forest | A | 1–0 | Daly | 21,893 |
| 28 March 1975 | Bristol Rovers | A | 1–1 | Macari | 19,337 |
| 29 March 1975 | York City | H | 2–1 | Morgan, Macari | 46,802 |
| 31 March 1975 | Oldham Athletic | H | 3–2 | McIlroy, Macari, Coppell | 56,618 |
| 5 April 1975 | Southampton | A | 1–0 | Macari | 21,866 |
| 12 April 1975 | Fulham | H | 1–0 | Daly | 52,971 |
| 19 April 1975 | Notts County | A | 2–2 | Houston, Greenhoff | 17,832 |
| 26 April 1975 | Blackpool | H | 4–0 | Pearson (2), Macari, Greenhoff | 58,769 |

| Pos | Team | Pld | W | D | L | GF | GA | GAv | Pts | Qualification or relegation |
|---|---|---|---|---|---|---|---|---|---|---|
| 1 | Manchester United (C, P) | 42 | 26 | 9 | 7 | 66 | 30 | 2.200 | 61 | Promotion to the First Division |
| 2 | Aston Villa (P) | 42 | 25 | 8 | 9 | 79 | 32 | 2.469 | 58 | UEFA Cup first round and promotion to the First Division (Note: Aston Villa qualified for the UEFA Cup as the 1974–75 Football League Cup winners.) |
| 3 | Norwich City (P) | 42 | 20 | 13 | 9 | 58 | 37 | 1.568 | 53 | Promotion to the First Division |
| 4 | Sunderland | 42 | 19 | 13 | 10 | 65 | 35 | 1.857 | 51 | |
| 5 | Bristol City | 42 | 21 | 8 | 13 | 47 | 33 | 1.424 | 50 | |

Rules for classification: 1) Points; 2) Goal average; 3) Goals scored
(C) Champions; (P) Promoted

== FA Cup ==
| Date | Round | Opponents | H / A | Result F–A | Scorers | Attendance |
|---|---|---|---|---|---|---|
| 4 January 1975 | Round 3 | Walsall | H | 0–0 | | 43,353 |
| 7 January 1975 | Round 3 Replay | Walsall | A | 2–3 (aet) | Daly (pen.), McIlroy | 18,105 |

== League Cup ==
| Date | Round | Opponents | H / A | Result F–A | Scorers | Attendance |
|---|---|---|---|---|---|---|
| 11 September 1974 | Round 2 | Charlton Athletic | H | 5–1 | Macari (2), McIlroy, Houston, Bowman (o.g.) | 21,616 |
| 9 October 1974 | Round 3 | Manchester City | H | 1–0 | Daly (pen.) | 55,159 |
| 13 November 1974 | Round 4 | Burnley | H | 3–2 | Macari (2), Morgan | 46,275 |
| 4 December 1974 | Round 5 | Middlesbrough | A | 0–0 | | 36,005 |
| 18 December 1974 | Round 5 Replay | Middlesbrough | H | 3–0 | Pearson, McIlroy, Macari | 49,501 |
| 15 January 1975 | Semi-Final; First leg | Norwich City | H | 2–2 | Macari (2) | 58,010 |
| 22 January 1975 | Semi-Final; Second leg | Norwich City | A | 0–1 | | 31,621 |

== Squad statistics ==
| Pos. | Name | League | | FA Cup | | League Cup | | Total | |
| Pos. | Name | Apps | Goals | Apps | Goals | Apps | Goals | Apps | Goals |
|---|---|---|---|---|---|---|---|---|---|
| GK | (Republic of Ireland) Paddy Roche | 2 | 0 | 0 | 0 | 0 | 0 | 2 | 0 |
| GK | (England) Alex Stepney | 40 | 0 | 2 | 0 | 7 | 0 | 49 | 0 |
| DF | (Scotland) Arthur Albiston | 2 | 0 | 0 | 0 | 1 | 0 | 3 | 0 |
| DF | (Scotland) Martin Buchan | 41 | 0 | 2 | 0 | 7 | 0 | 50 | 0 |
| DF | (Scotland) Alex Forsyth | 39 | 1 | 0 | 0 | 6 | 0 | 45 | 1 |
| DF | (England) Brian Greenhoff | 39(2) | 4 | 2 | 0 | 6 | 0 | 47(2) | 4 |
| DF | (Scotland) Jim Holton | 14 | 0 | 0 | 0 | 3 | 0 | 17 | 0 |
| DF | (Scotland) Stewart Houston | 40 | 6 | 2 | 0 | 6 | 1 | 48 | 7 |
| DF | (England) Steve James | 13 | 0 | 0 | 0 | 2 | 0 | 15 | 0 |
| DF | (Northern Ireland) Jimmy Nicholl | 0(1) | 0 | 0 | 0 | 0 | 0 | 0(1) | 0 |
| DF | (England) Arnie Sidebottom | 12 | 0 | 2 | 0 | 2 | 0 | 16 | 0 |
| DF | (England) Tony Young | 7(8) | 0 | 2 | 0 | 1(4) | 0 | 10(12) | 0 |
| MF | (England) Steve Coppell | 9(1) | 1 | 0 | 0 | 0 | 0 | 9(1) | 1 |
| MF | (Republic of Ireland) Gerry Daly | 36(1) | 11 | 2 | 1 | 7 | 1 | 45(1) | 13 |
| MF | (Scotland) George Graham | 0(1) | 0 | 0 | 0 | 0 | 0 | 0(1) | 0 |
| MF | (Republic of Ireland) Mick Martin | 7(1) | 0 | 0 | 0 | 1 | 0 | 8(1) | 0 |
| MF | (Scotland) Jim McCalliog | 20 | 3 | 1 | 0 | 5(1) | 0 | 26(1) | 3 |
| MF | (Northern Ireland) David McCreery | 0(2) | 0 | 0 | 0 | 0 | 0 | 0(2) | 0 |
| MF | (Northern Ireland) Sammy McIlroy | 41(1) | 7 | 2 | 1 | 7 | 2 | 50(1) | 10 |
| FW | (England) Tommy Baldwin | 2 | 0 | 0 | 0 | 0 | 0 | 2 | 0 |
| FW | (Wales) Ron Davies | 0(8) | 0 | 0(2) | 0 | 0 | 0 | 0(10) | 0 |
| FW | (Scotland) Lou Macari | 36(2) | 11 | 2 | 0 | 6(1) | 7 | 44(3) | 18 |
| FW | (Scotland) Willie Morgan | 32(2) | 3 | 1 | 0 | 6(1) | 1 | 39(3) | 4 |
| FW | (England) Stuart Pearson | 30(1) | 17 | 2 | 0 | 4 | 1 | 36(1) | 18 |
| – | Own goals | – | 2 | – | 0 | – | 1 | – | 3 |
