= 1975–76 Manchester United F.C. season =

English football club season

Manchester United
1975–76 season
- Chairman: Louis Edwards
- Manager: Tommy Docherty
- First Division: 3rd
- FA Cup: Runners-up
- League Cup: Fourth Round
- Top goalscorer: League: Stuart Pearson (13); All: Lou Macari (15)
- Highest home attendance: 61,879 vs Everton (17 April 1976)
- Lowest home attendance: 25,286 vs Brentford (10 September 1975)
- Average home league attendance: 53,276
| Home colours | Away colours |

The 1975–76 season was Manchester United's 74th season in The Football League and first in the First Division after winning the Second Division the season prior. They finished the season third in the First Division, their highest placing since 1968, to qualify for the UEFA Cup.

They reached the FA Cup Final at Wembley, where they lost 1–0 to Southampton of the Second Division. The only goal of the game came from Saints striker Bobby Stokes. It was the second time since World War II that a Second Division team had won the trophy, the other occasion had been three years earlier, when Sunderland beat Leeds United.

== First Division ==
| Date | Opponents | H / A | Result F–A | Scorers | Attendance | League position |
|---|---|---|---|---|---|---|
| 16 August 1975 | Wolverhampton Wanderers | A | 2–0 | Macari (2) | 32,348 | 1st |
| 19 August 1975 | Birmingham City | A | 2–0 | McIlroy (2) | 33,177 | 1st |
| 23 August 1975 | Sheffield United | H | 5–1 | Pearson (2), Badger (o.g.), Daly, McIlroy | 55,948 | 1st |
| 27 August 1975 | Coventry City | H | 1–1 | Pearson | 52,169 | 1st |
| 30 August 1975 | Stoke City | A | 1–0 | Dodd (o.g.) | 33,092 | 1st |
| 6 September 1975 | Tottenham Hotspur | H | 3–2 | Pratt (o.g.), Daly (2; 1 pen.) | 51,641 | 1st |
| 13 September 1975 | Queens Park Rangers | A | 0–1 | | 29,237 | 1st |
| 20 September 1975 | Ipswich Town | H | 1–0 | Houston | 50,513 | 1st |
| 24 September 1975 | Derby County | A | 1–2 | Daly | 33,187 | 2nd |
| 27 September 1975 | Manchester City | A | 2–2 | McCreery, Macari | 46,931 | 3rd |
| 4 October 1975 | Leicester City | H | 0–0 | | 47,878 | 1st |
| 11 October 1975 | Leeds United | A | 2–1 | McIlroy (2) | 40,264 | 2nd |
| 18 October 1975 | Arsenal | H | 3–1 | Coppell (2), Pearson | 53,885 | 1st |
| 25 October 1975 | West Ham United | A | 1–2 | Macari | 38,601 | 2nd |
| 1 November 1975 | Norwich City | H | 1–0 | Pearson | 50,587 | 1st |
| 8 November 1975 | Liverpool | A | 1–3 | Coppell | 49,137 | 5th |
| 15 November 1975 | Aston Villa | H | 2–0 | Coppell, McIlroy | 51,682 | 3rd |
| 22 November 1975 | Arsenal | A | 1–3 | Pearson | 40,102 | 5th |
| 29 November 1975 | Newcastle United | H | 1–0 | Daly | 52,624 | 4th |
| 6 December 1975 | Middlesbrough | A | 0–0 | | 32,454 | 4th |
| 13 December 1975 | Sheffield United | A | 4–1 | Pearson (2), Hill, Macari | 31,741 | 3rd |
| 20 December 1975 | Wolverhampton Wanderers | H | 1–0 | Hill | 44,269 | 2nd |
| 23 December 1975 | Everton | A | 1–1 | Macari | 41,732 | 1st |
| 27 December 1975 | Burnley | H | 2–1 | McIlroy, Macari | 59,726 | 2nd |
| 10 January 1976 | Queens Park Rangers | H | 2–1 | Hill, McIlroy | 58,312 | 1st |
| 17 January 1976 | Tottenham Hotspur | A | 1–1 | Hill | 49,189 | 1st |
| 31 January 1976 | Birmingham City | H | 3–1 | Forsyth, Macari, McIlroy | 50,726 | 1st |
| 7 February 1976 | Coventry City | A | 1–1 | Macari | 33,922 | 2nd |
| 18 February 1976 | Liverpool | H | 0–0 | | 59,709 | 2nd |
| 21 February 1976 | Aston Villa | A | 1–2 | Macari | 50,094 | 3rd |
| 25 February 1976 | Derby County | H | 1–1 | Pearson | 59,632 | 3rd |
| 28 February 1976 | West Ham United | H | 4–0 | Forsyth, Macari, McCreery, Pearson | 57,220 | 3rd |
| 13 March 1976 | Leeds United | H | 3–2 | Houston, Pearson, Daly | 59,429 | 3rd |
| 17 March 1976 | Norwich City | A | 1–1 | Hill | 27,782 | 2nd |
| 20 March 1976 | Newcastle United | A | 4–3 | Pearson (2), Bird (o.g.), Howard (o.g.) | 45,048 | 2nd |
| 27 March 1976 | Middlesbrough | H | 3–0 | Daly (pen.), McCreery, Hill | 58,527 | 2nd |
| 10 April 1976 | Ipswich Town | A | 0–3 | | 34,889 | 3rd |
| 17 April 1976 | Everton | H | 2–1 | Kenyon (o.g.), McCreery | 61,879 | 3rd |
| 19 April 1976 | Burnley | A | 1–0 | Macari | 27,418 | 3rd |
| 21 April 1976 | Stoke City | H | 0–1 | | 53,879 | 3rd |
| 24 April 1976 | Leicester City | A | 1–2 | Coyne | 31,053 | 3rd |
| 4 May 1976 | Manchester City | H | 2–0 | Hill, McIlroy | 59,517 | 3rd |

| Pos | Team | Pld | W | D | L | GF | GA | GAv | Pts | Qualification or relegation |
|---|---|---|---|---|---|---|---|---|---|---|
| 1 | Liverpool (C) | 42 | 23 | 14 | 5 | 66 | 31 | 2.129 | 60 | Qualification for the European Cup first round |
| 2 | Queens Park Rangers | 42 | 24 | 11 | 7 | 67 | 33 | 2.030 | 59 | Qualification for the UEFA Cup first round |
| 3 | Manchester United | 42 | 23 | 10 | 9 | 68 | 42 | 1.619 | 56 | Qualification for the UEFA Cup first round |
| 4 | Derby County | 42 | 21 | 11 | 10 | 75 | 58 | 1.293 | 53 | Qualification for the UEFA Cup first round |
| 5 | Leeds United | 42 | 21 | 9 | 12 | 65 | 46 | 1.413 | 51 | |

Source: World Football
Rules for classification: 1) Points; 2) Goal average; 3) Goals scored
(C) Champions

== FA Cup ==
| Date | Round | Opponents | H / A | Result F–A | Scorers | Attendance |
|---|---|---|---|---|---|---|
| 3 January 1976 | Round 3 | Oxford United | H | 2–1 | Daly (2; 2 pen.) | 41,082 |
| 24 January 1976 | Round 4 | Peterborough United | H | 3–1 | Forsyth, McIlroy, Hill | 56,352 |
| 14 February 1976 | Round 5 | Leicester City | A | 2–1 | Macari, Daly | 34,000 |
| 6 March 1976 | Round 6 | Wolverhampton Wanderers | H | 1–1 | Daly | 59,433 |
| 9 March 1976 | Round 6 Replay | Wolverhampton Wanderers | A | 3–2 (aet) | Pearson, Greenhoff, McIlroy | 44,373 |
| 3 April 1976 | Semi-Final | Derby County | N | 2–0 | Hill (2) | 55,000 |
| 1 May 1976 | Final | Southampton | N | 0–1 | | 100,000 |

== League Cup ==
| Date | Round | Opponents | H / A | Result F–A | Scorers | Attendance |
|---|---|---|---|---|---|---|
| 10 September 1975 | Round 2 | Brentford | H | 2–1 | Macari, McIlroy | 25,286 |
| 22 September 1975 | Round 3 | Aston Villa | A | 2–1 | Macari, Coppell | 41,447 |
| 12 November 1975 | Round 4 | Manchester City | A | 0–4 | | 50,182 |

== Squad statistics ==
| Pos. | Name | League | | FA Cup | | League Cup | | Total | |
| Pos. | Name | Apps | Goals | Apps | Goals | Apps | Goals | Apps | Goals |
|---|---|---|---|---|---|---|---|---|---|
| GK | (Republic of Ireland) Paddy Roche | 4 | 0 | 0 | 0 | 1 | 0 | 5 | 0 |
| GK | (England) Alex Stepney | 38 | 0 | 7 | 0 | 2 | 0 | 47 | 0 |
| DF | (Scotland) Arthur Albiston | 2(1) | 0 | 0 | 0 | 0 | 0 | 2(1) | 0 |
| DF | (Scotland) Martin Buchan | 42 | 0 | 7 | 0 | 3 | 0 | 52 | 0 |
| DF | (Scotland) Alex Forsyth | 28 | 2 | 7 | 1 | 0 | 0 | 35 | 3 |
| DF | (England) Brian Greenhoff | 40 | 0 | 7 | 1 | 3 | 0 | 50 | 1 |
| DF | (England) Tony Grimshaw | 0(1) | 0 | 0 | 0 | 0(1) | 0 | 0(2) | 0 |
| DF | (Scotland) Stewart Houston | 42 | 2 | 7 | 0 | 3 | 0 | 52 | 2 |
| DF | (Northern Ireland) Jimmy Nicholl | 15(5) | 0 | 0(2) | 0 | 3 | 0 | 18(7) | 0 |
| DF | (England) Tony Young | 0(1) | 0 | 0 | 0 | 0 | 0 | 0(1) | 0 |
| MF | (England) Steve Coppell | 39 | 4 | 7 | 0 | 3 | 1 | 49 | 5 |
| MF | (Republic of Ireland) Gerry Daly | 41 | 7 | 7 | 4 | 3 | 0 | 51 | 11 |
| MF | (Northern Ireland) Tommy Jackson | 16(1) | 0 | 0 | 0 | 3 | 0 | 19(1) | 0 |
| MF | (England) Jimmy Kelly | 0(1) | 0 | 0 | 0 | 0 | 0 | 0(1) | 0 |
| MF | (Northern Ireland) David McCreery | 12(16) | 4 | 1(2) | 0 | 0(1) | 0 | 13(19) | 4 |
| MF | (Northern Ireland) Sammy McIlroy | 41 | 10 | 7 | 2 | 3 | 1 | 51 | 13 |
| FW | (England) Peter Coyne | 1(1) | 1 | 0 | 0 | 0 | 0 | 1(1) | 1 |
| FW | (England) Gordon Hill | 26 | 7 | 7 | 3 | 0 | 0 | 33 | 10 |
| FW | (Scotland) Lou Macari | 36 | 12 | 6 | 1 | 3 | 2 | 45 | 15 |
| FW | (England) Stuart Pearson | 39 | 13 | 7 | 1 | 3 | 0 | 49 | 14 |
| – | Own goals | – | 6 | – | 0 | – | 0 | – | 6 |
