= Gerry Daly =

Irish association football player

Personal information
- Full name: Gerard Anthony Daly
- Date of birth: 30 April 1954 (age 72)
- Place of birth: Cabra, Dublin, Ireland
- Height: 1.75 m (5 ft 9 in)
- Position: Midfielder

Senior career*
Years	Team	Apps	(Gls)
1972–1973	Bohemians	?	(5)
1973–1977	Manchester United	111	(23)
1977–1980	Derby County	112	(31)
1978	→ New England Tea Men (loan)	18	(7)
1979	→ New England Tea Men (loan)	23	(9)
1980–1984	Coventry City	84	(19)
1983	→ Leicester City (loan)	17	(1)
1984–1985	Birmingham City	32	(1)
1985–1987	Shrewsbury Town	55	(8)
1987–1988	Stoke City	22	(1)
1988–1989	Doncaster Rovers	39	(4)
1989–1991	Telford United	31	(4)
Total		544	(113)

International career
1973–1986	Republic of Ireland	48	(13)

Managerial career
- 1989–1990: Telford United (player-assistant manager)
- 1990–1993: Telford United
- * Club domestic league appearances and goals

Gerard Anthony Daly (born 30 April 1954) is an Irish former footballer who played in the Football League for Manchester United, Derby County, Coventry City, Leicester City, Birmingham City, Shrewsbury Town, Stoke City, Doncaster Rovers as well as the Republic of Ireland national team.

== Club career ==
Daly was born in Cabra, Dublin, and started his football career in Drumcondra with Stella Maris. His first senior club was Bohemians, for whom he scored in the UEFA Cup away to Köln in September 1972. In 1973, Manchester United manager Tommy Docherty paid Bohemians £20,000 for Daly's services. In Daly's first season at Old Trafford, the team was relegated to the Second Division after finishing 21st out of 22 teams. Despite this setback, Manchester United gained an instant return to the top flight with Daly being a key player. He continued his good form into the 1975–76 season, playing in 51 matches, including the 1976 FA Cup final. Midway through the 1976–77 season, Daly was sold to Derby County for a fee of £175,000.

Daly was soon reunited his old manager Docherty, who was appointed manager of the Rams in September 1977. Although they did not get on, Daly remained with Derby until 1980. Daly scored a famous penalty for Derby in 1977 against Manchester City where the penalty spot had to be re-painted during the game, due to the poor condition of the Baseball Ground pitch. During his time with Derby, Daly spent time on loan with the New England Tea Men of the North American Soccer League in 1978 and 1979. Following Derby's relegation in 1980, Daly signed for Coventry City, with whom he spent four seasons, including a spell on loan to Leicester City in 1982.

He then spent a season at Birmingham City before signing for Shrewsbury Town in October 1985. His experience helped them remain in the second tier finishing in 17th position in 1985–86 and 18th in 1986–87. This prompted Stoke City manager Mick Mills to sign Daly in March 1987. In 1987–88 Daly played 30 times for Stoke scoring three goals but fell out of favour in March 1988 and was released at the end of the season. He then moved on to Fourth Division Doncaster Rovers where he spent the 1988–89 season playing in 44 matches. He joined non-league Telford United in 1989 and later managed the club between 1990 and 1993.

== International career ==
Daly represented Ireland from 1973 to 1986, earning 48 caps. He won his first cap in a friendly against Poland. He scored 13 international goals, making him one of the top-scoring Irish midfielders. His first goal in 1976 was a penalty in a 1–1 draw against England at Wembley. He scored another goal against England in the Euro qualifiers in 1978. He also scored against Denmark in the Euro qualifiers of 1980. Another goal came in a 2–1 victory over the Netherlands in a World Cup qualifier in 1980.

Daly's last goal for Ireland was in 1986 in a match against Iceland in the Iceland Triangular Tournament to earn Ireland a 2–1 win, and his last match for Ireland was against Scotland in 1986 at Lansdowne Road in a Euro 1988 qualifying match.

== Career statistics ==
=== Club ===
Appearances and goals by club, season and competition
Club	Season	League			FA Cup		League Cup		Europe		Other^{[A]}		Total	
Club	Season	Division	Apps	Goals	Apps	Goals	Apps	Goals	Apps	Goals	Apps	Goals	Apps	Goals
Manchester United	1972–73	First Division	0	0	0	0	0	0	0	0	2	0	2	0
Manchester United	1973–74	First Division	16	1	0	0	1	0	0	0	0	0	17	1
Manchester United	1974–75	Second Division	37	11	2	1	7	1	0	0	0	0	46	13
Manchester United	1975–76	First Division	41	7	7	4	3	0	0	0	0	0	51	11
Manchester United	1976–77	First Division	17	4	1	0	6	3	4	0	0	0	28	7
Manchester United	Total		111	23	10	5	17	4	4	0	2	0	144	32
Derby County	1976–77	First Division	17	7	0	0	0	0	0	0	0	0	17	7
Derby County	1977–78	First Division	37	10	3	1	2	1	0	0	0	0	42	12
Derby County	1978–79	First Division	37	13	1	0	2	0	0	0	0	0	40	13
Derby County	1979–80	First Division	21	1	1	1	1	0	0	0	0	0	23	2
Derby County	Total		112	31	5	2	5	1	0	0	0	0	122	34
New England Tea Men (loan)	1978	NASL	18	7	–		–		–		–		18	7
New England Tea Men (loan)	1979	NASL	23	9	–		–		–		–		23	9
New England Tea Men (loan)	Total		41	16	–		–		–		–		41	16
Coventry City	1980–81	First Division	35	8	4	2	7	1	0	0	0	0	46	11
Coventry City	1981–82	First Division	19	4	2	0	0	0	0	0	0	0	21	4
Coventry City	1982–83	First Division	2	0	0	0	0	0	0	0	0	0	2	0
Coventry City	1983–84	First Division	28	7	4	0	0	0	0	0	0	0	32	7
Coventry City	Total		84	19	10	2	7	1	0	0	0	0	101	22
Leicester City (loan)	1982–83	Second Division	17	1	0	0	0	0	0	0	0	0	17	1
Birmingham City	1984–85	Second Division	30	1	4	0	2	0	0	0	0	0	36	1
Birmingham City	1985–86	First Division	2	0	0	0	0	0	0	0	0	0	2	0
Birmingham City	Total		32	1	4	0	2	0	0	0	0	0	38	1
Shrewsbury Town	1985–86	Second Division	27	4	1	0	1	0	0	0	1	0	30	4
Shrewsbury Town	1986–87	Second Division	28	4	1	0	6	0	0	0	1	0	36	4
Shrewsbury Town	Total		55	4	2	0	7	0	0	0	2	0	66	8
Stoke City	1986–87	Second Division	1	0	0	0	0	0	0	0	0	0	1	0
Stoke City	1987–88	Second Division	21	1	0	0	4	1	0	0	4	1	29	3
Stoke City	Total		22	1	0	0	4	1	0	0	4	1	30	3
Doncaster Rovers	1988–89	Fourth Division	39	4	1	1	1	0	0	0	2	0	44	5
Telford United	1989–90	Football Conference	20	2	0	0	0	0	0	0	0	0	20	2
Telford United	1990–91	Football Conference	11	2	0	0	0	0	0	0	0	0	11	2
Telford United	Total		31	4	0	0	0	0	0	0	0	0	31	4
Career total			544	108	32	10	43	7	4	0	10	1	634	124

A. The "Other" column constitutes appearances and goals in the Anglo-Italian Cup, Full Members Cup and Football League Trophy.

=== International ===
National team	Year	Apps	Goals
Republic of Ireland	1973	2	0
Republic of Ireland	1974	2	0
Republic of Ireland	1975	2	0
Republic of Ireland	1976	3	2
Republic of Ireland	1977	3	0
Republic of Ireland	1978	4	2
Republic of Ireland	1979	3	1
Republic of Ireland	1980	7	4
Republic of Ireland	1981	5	0
Republic of Ireland	1982	5	1
Republic of Ireland	1983	2	1
Republic of Ireland	1984	2	0
Republic of Ireland	1985	4	0
Republic of Ireland	1986	4	2
Total		48	13

== Honours ==
Manchester United

- Football League Second Division: 1974–75
- FA Cup runner-up: 1975–76
