= Sammy McIlroy =

Northern Irish footballer

Sammy McIlroy MBE
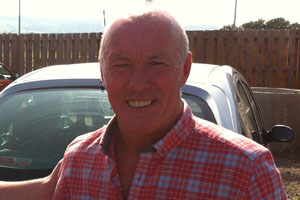
- McIlroy in 2013

Personal information
- Full name: Samuel Baxter McIlroy
- Date of birth: 2 August 1954 (age 72)
- Place of birth: Belfast, Northern Ireland
- Height: 5 ft 10 in (1.78 m)
- Position: Midfielder

Youth career
- 1969–1971: Manchester United

Senior career*
Years	Team	Apps	(Gls)
1971–1982	Manchester United	342	(57)
1982–1985	Stoke City	133	(14)
1985–1986	Manchester City	13	(1)
1986	Örgryte	7	(0)
1986–1989	Bury	100	(8)
1988	→ VfB Mödling (loan)	6	(1)
1989–1991	Preston North End	20	(0)
1991–1993	Northwich Victoria	8	(0)
Total		629	(81)

International career
1972–1987	Northern Ireland	88	(5)

Managerial career
- 1992–1993: Northwich Victoria
- 1993–2000: Macclesfield Town
- 2000–2003: Northern Ireland
- 2003–2004: Stockport County
- 2005–2011: Morecambe (Note: McIlroy first served as caretaker manager from late 2005 while Jim Harvey was recovering from a heart attack. McIlroy was officially appointed as Morecambe's manager in May 2006.)
- * Club domestic league appearances and goals

Samuel Baxter McIlroy MBE (born 2 August 1954) is a Northern Irish retired footballer who played for Manchester United, Stoke City, Manchester City, Örgryte (Sweden), Bury, VfB Mödling (Austria), Preston North End and the Northern Ireland national team.

After playing, he managed several English football teams and the Northern Ireland national team, gaining most success with Macclesfield Town. He was most recently the manager of Football League Two side Morecambe, which he helped guide to the English Football League for the first time in their history.

McIlroy was appointed Member of the Order of the British Empire (MBE) in the 1986 Birthday Honours for services to association football.

== Club career ==
McIlroy was born in Belfast and moved to English club Manchester United in 1969 becoming Matt Busby's final signing. He made his debut on 6 November 1971 in the Manchester derby against Manchester City scoring in a 3–3 draw. He drifted in and out of the side and played in 31 matches in 1973–74 as Manchester United suffered a rare relegation. He was an ever-present in 1974–75 playing in all of the club's 51 fixtures as they gained an instant return to the First Division. On their return they finished in third place and also reached the 1976 FA Cup final where they lost 1–0 to Southampton.

A year later, McIlroy picked up a winner's medal as United triumphed 2–1 against Liverpool. A runners-up medal in the FA Cup followed two years after that as Manchester United were defeated 3–2 by Arsenal, with McIlroy equalising for United having been 2–0 down, only for Alan Sunderland to dramatically win it for Arsenal minutes afterwards. After spending ten seasons at Old Trafford making 419 appearances scoring 71 goals he left for Stoke City in February 1982.

Stoke City paid Manchester United a club record fee of £350,000 for McIlroy on 2 February 1982. He arrived at Stoke with the club in deep relegation trouble in 1981–82 and he played in 18 matches as Stoke avoided the drop by two points. In 1982–83 Stoke had a solid midfield with McIlroy playing alongside former Manchester United team-mate Mickey Thomas, Mark Chamberlain and Paul Bracewell and the side finished in a mid-table position of 13th in 1982–83. However the 1983–84 season saw Stoke struggle again and McIlroy and the returning Alan Hudson helped Stoke stage a revival which saw they stay up by two points. In 1984–85 Stoke suffered an embarrassing relegation going down with a then record low points tally of 17 with McIlroy winning the player of the year award. He was handed a free transfer in the summer of 1985 and McIlroy went on to play at Manchester City in the 1985–86 season, Swedish club Örgryte IS in 1986, Bury from 1986 to 1989 and Preston North End from 1989 to 1991. McIlroy's last club as a player was with Northwich Victoria from 1991 to 1993.

== International career ==
As a player for Northern Ireland McIlroy won 88 caps and scored 5 goals. He played in all of the country's matches during both the 1982 World Cup, where Northern Ireland defeated the host nation Spain and advanced to the second round, and the 1986 World Cup in which he captained the team. He was also part of the Northern Ireland side which won the final Home Internationals Championship.

== Managerial career ==
McIlroy began his managerial career as player-coach under John McGrath at Preston North End in 1991. He then went on to manage non-league team Ashton United and Northwich Victoria before joining Macclesfield Town for six and a half seasons, culminating in their promotion to the Football League in 1997.

McIlroy arrived at the Moss Rose in 1993 replacing Peter Wragg who had narrowly avoided relegation the previous season. McIlroy's first season at the Moss Rose saw a very creditable seventh-place finish plus silverware in the shape of the Bob Lord Trophy. His second season surpassed all expectations as his skilful and flowing football brought the Silkmen a conference title, only to be denied promotion to the Football League thanks to ground regulations. The following season brought more silver to the club as the Silkmen beat Northwich Victoria 3–1 at Wembley to win the club's second FA Trophy. But the ultimate prize of League football was still elusive as the club finished fourth in the pre-play-off Conference. 1996–97 was a red letter season for the Silkmen as a final day, 4–1 victory over Kettering Town secured promotion to the Football League for the first time in 120 years. The success continued the following year and 1997–98 began well with a home win over Torquay. The Silkmen finished the season unbeaten at home and were promoted into the Football League Second Division in second place.

But that promotion was a bridge too far for the rapidly rising club. Facing the might of Manchester City, Fulham, Wigan, Stoke, Reading, Preston and the like, the Silkmen eventually finished bottom of the division, but still achieved 46 points. McIlroy left the Moss Rose in 1999 to take up the position at his own national team.

He managed Northern Ireland for nearly three years, but the team won only five times in 29 matches, with all of the wins occurring in McIlroy's first year. The side failed to score even a single goal in 8 qualifying matches for Euro 2004, but did achieve a respectable 0–0 draw against Spain. Upon completion of the qualifying matches, McIlroy resigned to re-enter club management with Stockport County. He spent just over a year at Edgeley Park which saw him win just 14 matches.

On 17 November 2005, he took over as caretaker manager of Conference side Morecambe, stepping in for incumbent manager Jim Harvey who had suffered a heart attack. Having guided Morecambe into the Conference play-offs – where they lost 4–3 on aggregate to Hereford United, McIlroy was appointed permanent manager in May 2006. In his first full season, Morecambe again reached they play-offs where they defeated Exeter City to win promotion to the Football League in one of the first games played at the new Wembley Stadium.

McIlroy guided Morecambe to a respectable 11th-place finish in 2007–08, the club's inaugural season in the Football League, as well as leading the side to League Cup scalps against Preston North End and Wolverhampton Wanderers, at Deepdale and Molineux respectively. In 2008–09, McIlroy again secured an 11th-place finish League Two. Morecambe's third season in the Football League saw them surpass their highest ever finishes of the previous two seasons, with McIlroy steering the Shrimps to a 4th-place finish, and participation in the League Two play-off semi-finals. However, a 6–0 capitulation away at eventual winners Dagenham & Redbridge in the first leg rendered the second leg virtually irrelevant, although McIlroy motivated his team to secure a 2–1 victory, in what was the final match to be played at Christie Park, Morecambe's home for 89 years. On 9 May 2011 McIlroy left Morecambe by mutual consent after a 20th-place finish in the league.

On 10 October 2022, McIlroy returned to Macclesfield (the successor to his former club, Macclesfield Town) in a mentoring capacity, to work closely with manager Danny Whitaker.

== Career statistics ==
=== Club ===
- Sourced from Sammy McIlroy at the English National Football Archive (subscription required)

Appearances and goals by club, season and competition
Club	Season	League			FA Cup		League Cup		Europe		Other^{[A]}		Total	
Club	Season	Division	Apps	Goals	Apps	Goals	Apps	Goals	Apps	Goals	Apps	Goals	Apps	Goals
Manchester United	1971–72	First Division	16	4	3	0	2	0	—		—		21	4
Manchester United	1972–73	First Division	10	0	0	0	3	1	—		—		13	1
Manchester United	1973–74	First Division	29	6	2	0	0	0	—		—		31	6
Manchester United	1974–75	Second Division	42	7	2	1	7	2	—		—		51	10
Manchester United	1975–76	First Division	41	10	7	2	3	1	—		—		51	13
Manchester United	1976–77	First Division	40	2	7	0	6	0	4	1	—		57	3
Manchester United	1977–78	First Division	39	9	4	0	0	0	4	0	1	0	48	9
Manchester United	1978–79	First Division	40	5	9	2	2	1	—		—		51	8
Manchester United	1979–80	First Division	41	6	2	1	2	1	—		—		45	8
Manchester United	1980–81	First Division	32	5	1	0	2	0	2	1	—		37	6
Manchester United	1981–82	First Division	12	3	1	0	1	0	—		—		14	3
Manchester United	Total		342	57	38	6	28	6	10	2	1	0	419	71
Stoke City	1981–82	First Division	18	3	—		—		—		—		18	3
Stoke City	1982–83	First Division	41	8	3	0	2	0	—		—		46	8
Stoke City	1983–84	First Division	40	1	1	0	3	0	—		—		44	1
Stoke City	1984–85	First Division	34	2	2	0	0	0	—		—		36	2
Stoke City	Total		133	14	6	0	5	0	—		0	0	144	14
Manchester City	1985–86	First Division	12	1	0	0	1	0	—		2	0	15	1
Manchester City	1986–87	First Division	1	0	0	0	0	0	—		—		1	0
Manchester City	Total		13	1	0	0	1	0	—		2	0	16	1
Örgryte	1986	Allsvenskan	7	0	—		—		—		—		7	0
Bury	1986–87	Third Division	15	2	0	0	0	0	—		0	0	15	2
Bury	1987–88	Third Division	28	4	1	1	6	0	—		3	2	38	6
Bury	1988–89	Third Division	45	2	2	0	4	0	—		2	0	53	2
Bury	1989–90	Third Division	12	0	2	0	2	0	—		0	0	16	0
Bury	Total		100	8	5	1	12	0	—		5	2	122	11
VfB Mödling (loan)	1987–88	Austrian Bundesliga	6	1	—		—		—		—		6	1
Preston North End	1989–90	Third Division	20	0	0	0	0	0	—		0	0	20	0
Career Total			621	81	49	7	46	6	10	2	8	2	734	98

A. The "Other" column constitutes appearances and goals in the FA Charity Shield and Full Members Cup.

=== International ===
National team	Year	Apps	Goals
Northern Ireland	1974	5	0
Northern Ireland	1975	7	1
Northern Ireland	1976	5	0
Northern Ireland	1977	7	1
Northern Ireland	1978	6	0
Northern Ireland	1979	8	0
Northern Ireland	1980	6	1
Northern Ireland	1981	6	0
Northern Ireland	1982	12	1
Northern Ireland	1983	8	1
Northern Ireland	1984	4	0
Northern Ireland	1985	5	0
Northern Ireland	1986	7	0
Total		85	5

==== International goals ====
Scores and results list Northern Ireland's goal tally first

Goal	Date	Venue	Opponent	Score	Result	Competition
1	29 October 1975	Belfast, Northern Ireland	Norway	2–0	3–0	Euro 1976 qualification
2	21 September 1977	Belfast, Northern Ireland	Iceland	2–0	2–0	1978 World Cup qualification
3	15 October 1980	Belfast, Northern Ireland	Sweden	2–0	3–0	1982 World Cup qualification
4	28 April 1982	Belfast, Northern Ireland	Scotland	1–1	1–1	1982 British Home Championship
5	13 December 1983	Belfast, Northern Ireland	Scotland	2–0	2–0	1984 British Home Championship

== Honours ==
=== Player ===
Manchester United

- Football League Second Division: 1974–75
- FA Cup: 1976–77; runner-up: 1975–76, 1978–79
- FA Charity Shield: 1977 (shared)

Individual

- Stoke City Player of the Year: 1985
- PFA Team of the Year: 1988–89 Third Division

=== Manager ===
Macclesfield Town

- Football Conference: 1994–95, 1996–97
- Conference League Cup: 1993–94
- FA Trophy: 1995–96

Morecambe

- Conference National play-offs: 2007

Individual

- Football League Two Manager of the Month: August 2007, February 2009
