= 1978–79 FA Cup =

Tournament details
- Country: England; Wales

Final positions
- Champions: Arsenal (5th title)
- Runners-up: Manchester United

Tournament statistics
- Top goal scorer(s): Frank Stapleton; Alan Sunderland (6 goals)

The 1978–79 FA Cup was the 98th staging of the world's oldest football knockout competition, the Football Association Challenge Cup, or FA Cup. The final saw Arsenal defeat Manchester United 3–2, with three of the five goals being scored in the last five minutes.

== Qualifying rounds ==
Most participating clubs that were not members of the Football League competed in the qualifying rounds to secure one of 28 places available in the first round.

The winners from the fourth qualifying round were Blyth Spartans, Workington, Runcorn, Chorley, Morecambe, Southport, Droylsden, Nuneaton Borough, AP Leamington, Stafford Rangers, Boston United, Worksop Town, Hitchin Town, Enfield, March Town United, Barking, Dagenham, Wealdstone, Barnet, Dartford, Maidstone United, Gravesend & Northfleet, Woking, Hillingdon Borough, Worcester City, Yeovil Town, Weymouth and Merthyr Tydfil.

For the first time since 1910–11, all successful qualifying clubs had appeared in the competition proper before. However, Gravesend & Northfleet had not featured at this stage since 1965–66, Chorley had last done so in 1963–64, Worksop Town had last done so in 1961–62, Worcester City in 1960–61, March Town United in 1955–56 and Barking in 1928–29.

Maidstone United was the most successful club from this season's qualifying rounds, progressing from the first qualifying round to the third round proper after defeating Horsham YMCA, Dover, Ramsgate, Waterlooville, Wycombe Wanderers and Exeter City. Charlton Athletic then needed a replay to knock them out of the tournament.

== First round proper ==
The 48 teams from the Football League Third and Fourth Divisions entered in this round along with the 28 non-league clubs from the qualifying rounds and Altrincham, Leatherhead, Scarborough and Wycombe Wanderers who were given byes. The first round of games were played on 25 November 1978. Replays were played mainly on 28–29 November, with two on 5–6 December.

Tie no	Home team	Score	Away team	Date
1	Blackpool	2–1	Lincoln City	25 November 1978
2	Chester	1–1	Runcorn	25 November 1978
Replay	Runcorn	0–5	Chester	28 November 1978
3	Darlington	1–1	Chesterfield	25 November 1978
Replay	Chesterfield	0–1	Darlington	6 December 1978
4	Dartford	1–2	AP Leamington	25 November 1978
5	AFC Bournemouth	2–1	Hitchin Town	25 November 1978
6	Barnet	3–3	Woking	25 November 1978
Replay	Woking	3–3	Barnet	28 November 1978
Replay	Woking	3–0	Barnet	5 December 1978
7	Rochdale	0–1	Droylsden	25 November 1978
8	Watford	3–0	Dagenham	25 November 1978
9	Yeovil Town	0–1	Barking	25 November 1978
10	Reading	0–0	Gillingham	25 November 1978
Replay	Gillingham	1–2	Reading	28 November 1978
11	Walsall	0–2	Torquay United	25 November 1978
12	Swindon Town	2–0	March Town United	25 November 1978
13	Doncaster Rovers	2–1	Huddersfield Town	25 November 1978
14	Tranmere Rovers	2–1	Boston United	25 November 1978
15	Stockport County	5–1	Morecambe	25 November 1978
16	Chorley	0–1	Scarborough	25 November 1978
17	Barnsley	5–1	Worksop Town	25 November 1978
18	Maidstone United	1–0	Wycombe Wanderers	25 November 1978
19	Portsmouth	2–0	Northampton Town	25 November 1978
20	Bradford City	1–0	Port Vale	25 November 1978
21	Hull City	2–1	Stafford Rangers	25 November 1978
22	Carlisle United	1–0	Halifax Town	25 November 1978
23	Worcester City	2–0	Plymouth Argyle	25 November 1978
24	Altrincham	4–3	Southport	25 November 1978
25	Southend United	3–2	Peterborough United	25 November 1978
26	Exeter City	1–0	Brentford	25 November 1978
27	Scunthorpe United	1–1	Sheffield Wednesday	25 November 1978
Replay	Sheffield Wednesday	1–0	Scunthorpe United	28 November 1978
28	Mansfield Town	0–2	Shrewsbury Town	25 November 1978
29	Wealdstone	0–5	Enfield	25 November 1978
30	York City	1–1	Blyth Spartans	25 November 1978
Replay	Blyth Spartans	3–5	York City	28 November 1978
31	Hereford United	0–1	Newport County	25 November 1978
32	Rotherham United	3–0	Workington	25 November 1978
33	Aldershot	1–1	Weymouth	25 November 1978
Replay	Weymouth	0–2	Aldershot	29 November 1978
34	Wigan Athletic	2–2	Bury	25 November 1978
Replay	Bury	4–1	Wigan Athletic	28 November 1978
35	Colchester United	4–2	Oxford United	25 November 1978
36	Nuneaton Borough	0–2	Crewe Alexandra	25 November 1978
37	Gravesend & Northfleet	0–0	Wimbledon	25 November 1978
Replay	Wimbledon	1–0	Gravesend & Northfleet	28 November 1978
38	Leatherhead	2–1	Merthyr Tydfil	25 November 1978
39	Swansea City	4–1	Hillingdon Borough	25 November 1978
40	Hartlepool United	1–0	Grimsby Town	25 November 1978

== Second round proper ==
The second round of games were played on 16 December 1978. Replays took place mainly on 18–19 with one on 28 December and another on 9 January 1979.

Tie no	Home team	Score	Away team	Date
1	Darlington	2–1	Chester	16 December 1978
2	Barking	1–2	Aldershot	16 December 1978
3	Bury	3–1	Blackpool	16 December 1978
4	Watford	1–1	Southend United	16 December 1978
Replay	Southend United	1–0	Watford	18 December 1978
5	Crewe Alexandra	0–1	Hartlepool United	16 December 1978
6	Swindon Town	3–0	Enfield	16 December 1978
7	Doncaster Rovers	0–3	Shrewsbury Town	16 December 1978
8	Tranmere Rovers	1–1	Sheffield Wednesday	16 December 1978
Replay	Sheffield Wednesday	4–0	Tranmere Rovers	19 December 1978
9	Stockport County	4–2	Bradford City	16 December 1978
10	Barnsley	1–1	Rotherham United	16 December 1978
Replay	Rotherham United	2–1	Barnsley	9 January 1979
11	Maidstone United	1–0	Exeter City	16 December 1978
12	Portsmouth	0–1	Reading	16 December 1978
13	Carlisle United	3–0	Hull City	16 December 1978
14	Wimbledon	1–1	AFC Bournemouth	16 December 1978
Replay	AFC Bournemouth	1–2	Wimbledon	28 December 1978
15	Newport County	0–0	Worcester City	16 December 1978
Replay	Worcester City	1–2	Newport County	18 December 1978
16	York City	3–0	Scarborough	16 December 1978
17	Droylsden	0–2	Altrincham	16 December 1978
18	Leatherhead	1–1	Colchester United	16 December 1978
Replay	Colchester United	4–0	Leatherhead	19 December 1978
19	Swansea City	2–2	Woking	16 December 1978
Replay	Woking	3–5	Swansea City	19 December 1978
20	AP Leamington	0–1	Torquay United	16 December 1978

== Third round proper ==
Teams from the Football League First and Second Division entered in this round. The third round of games in the FA Cup were intended to be played on 6 January 1979, but only four games were actually played on this date. Twenty more ties were played midweek over 8–10 January with a few more taking place on 15–16 and one on 18 January. Replays were intended for 9–10 January but again took place at various times. One tie, between Wrexham and Stockport County, suffered six postponements before finally being played on 1 February, by which time Arsenal and Sheffield Wednesday had played five times, the tie needing a fourth replay before being settled. Maidstone United and Altrincham were the last non-league clubs left in the competition.

Tie no	Home team	Score	Away team	Date
1	Darlington	0–1	Colchester United	9 January 1979
2	Bristol City	3–1	Bolton Wanderers	9 January 1979
3	Preston North End	3–0	Derby County	16 January 1979
4	Leicester City	3–0	Norwich City	6 January 1979
5	Notts County	4–2	Reading	9 January 1979
6	Nottingham Forest	2–0	Aston Villa	10 January 1979
7	Blackburn Rovers	2–1	Millwall	10 January 1979
8	Sheffield Wednesday	1–1	Arsenal	6 January 1979
Replay	Arsenal	1–1	Sheffield Wednesday	9 January 1979
Replay	Sheffield Wednesday	2–2	Arsenal	15 January 1979
Replay	Arsenal	3–3	Sheffield Wednesday	17 January 1979
Replay	Sheffield Wednesday	0–2	Arsenal	22 January 1979
9	Middlesbrough	1–1	Crystal Palace	9 January 1979
Replay	Crystal Palace	1–0	Middlesbrough	15 January 1979
10	Sunderland	2–1	Everton	10 January 1979
11	Swindon Town	3–0	Cardiff City	9 January 1979
12	Shrewsbury Town	3–1	Cambridge United	6 January 1979
13	Wrexham	6–2	Stockport County	1 February 1979
14	Sheffield United	0–0	Aldershot	9 January 1979
Replay	Aldershot	1–0	Sheffield United	15 January 1979
15	Ipswich Town	3–2	Carlisle United	10 January 1979
16	Newcastle United	3–1	Torquay United	16 January 1979
17	Tottenham Hotspur	1–1	Altrincham	10 January 1979
Replay	Altrincham	0–3	Tottenham Hotspur	16 January 1979
18	Manchester City	0–0	Rotherham United	15 January 1979
Replay	Rotherham United	2–4	Manchester City	17 January 1979
19	Fulham	2–0	Queens Park Rangers	9 January 1979
20	Coventry City	2–2	West Bromwich Albion	9 January 1979
Replay	West Bromwich Albion	4–0	Coventry City	15 January 1979
21	Brighton & Hove Albion	2–3	Wolverhampton Wanderers	9 January 1979
22	Manchester United	3–0	Chelsea	15 January 1979
23	Wimbledon	0–2	Southampton	9 January 1979
24	Southend United	0–0	Liverpool	10 January 1979
Replay	Liverpool	3–0	Southend United	17 January 1979
25	Newport County	2–1	West Ham United	9 January 1979
26	Charlton Athletic	1–1	Maidstone United	9 January 1979
Replay	Maidstone United	1–2	Charlton Athletic	15 January 1979
27	York City	2–0	Luton Town	9 January 1979
28	Stoke City	0–1	Oldham Athletic	17 January 1979
29	Birmingham City	0–2	Burnley	6 January 1979
30	Orient	3–2	Bury	9 January 1979
31	Swansea City	0–1	Bristol Rovers	8 January 1979
32	Hartlepool United	2–6	Leeds United	18 January 1979

- During the 1–1 draw between Charlton Athletic and Maidstone United, referee Brian Martin sent off Charlton players Mike Flanagan and Derek Hales for fighting each other.
- Shortly after Norwich City's 3–0 loss to Leicester, manager John Bond transfer-listed three players - John Ryan, Graham Paddon and Martin Chivers.

== Fourth round proper ==
The fourth round of games were intended to be played over the weekend 26–27 January 1979, but by this time only eight matches had been played, of which three went to replays. The other games were completed either midweek on 29–31st, or on 5 or 12 February. Replays were played at various times after the initial games.

Tie no	Home team	Score	Away team	Date
1	Burnley	1–1	Sunderland	21 February 1979
Replay	Sunderland	0–3	Burnley	26 February 1979
2	Liverpool	1–0	Blackburn Rovers	30 January 1979
3	Preston North End	0–1	Southampton	12 February 1979
4	Nottingham Forest	3–1	York City	27 January 1979
5	Leeds United	3–3	West Bromwich Albion	26 February 1979
Replay	West Bromwich Albion	2–0	Leeds United	1 March 1979
6	Shrewsbury Town	2–0	Manchester City	27 January 1979
7	Ipswich Town	0–0	Orient	27 January 1979
Replay	Orient	0–2	Ipswich Town	30 January 1979
8	Newcastle United	1–1	Wolverhampton Wanderers	27 January 1979
Replay	Wolverhampton Wanderers	1–0	Newcastle United	22 February 1979
9	Tottenham Hotspur	3–3	Wrexham	12 February 1979
Replay	Wrexham	2–3	Tottenham Hotspur	21 February 1979
10	Fulham	1–1	Manchester United	31 January 1979
Replay	Manchester United	1–0	Fulham	12 February 1979
11	Bristol Rovers	1–0	Charlton Athletic	5 February 1979
12	Oldham Athletic	3–1	Leicester City	26 February 1979
13	Crystal Palace	3–0	Bristol City	29 January 1979
14	Newport County	0–0	Colchester United	30 January 1979
Replay	Colchester United	1–0	Newport County	5 February 1979
15	Arsenal	2–0	Notts County	27 January 1979
16	Aldershot	2–1	Swindon Town	30 January 1979

== Fifth round proper ==
The fifth set of games was played on either 20, 26 or 28 February, or 10 March 1979. Two replays were played on 26 February and 12 March.

Tie no	Home team	Score	Away team	Date
1	Liverpool	3–0	Burnley	28 February 1979
2	Nottingham Forest	0–1	Arsenal	26 February 1979
3	West Bromwich Albion	1–1	Southampton	10 March 1979
Replay	Southampton	2–1	West Bromwich Albion	12 March 1979
4	Ipswich Town	6–1	Bristol Rovers	26 February 1979
5	Oldham Athletic	0–1	Tottenham Hotspur	28 February 1979
6	Crystal Palace	0–1	Wolverhampton Wanderers	26 February 1979
7	Aldershot	2–2	Shrewsbury Town	20 February 1979
Replay	Shrewsbury Town	3–1	Aldershot	26 February 1979
8	Colchester United	0–1	Manchester United	20 February 1979

== Sixth round proper ==
The sixth round of FA Cup games were played on 10 March 1979, except for the Southampton–Arsenal match which began on 19 March. Holders Ipswich Town were eliminated by Liverpool. There were three replays.

Tie no	Home team	Score	Away team	Date
1	Southampton	1–1	Arsenal	19 March 1979
Replay	Arsenal	2–0	Southampton	21 March 1979
2	Wolverhampton Wanderers	1–1	Shrewsbury Town	10 March 1979
Replay	Shrewsbury Town	1–3	Wolverhampton Wanderers	13 March 1979
3	Ipswich Town	0–1	Liverpool	10 March 1979
4	Tottenham Hotspur	1–1	Manchester United	10 March 1979
Replay	Manchester United	2–0	Tottenham Hotspur	14 March 1979

== Semi finals ==
31 March 1979

Manchester United	2–2	Liverpool
Jordan; B. Greenhoff		Dalglish; Hansen

Maine Road, Manchester
Referee: David Richardson (Great Harwood, Lancashire)
31 March 1979

Arsenal	2–0	Wolverhampton Wanderers
Stapleton; Sunderland

Villa Park, Birmingham
Referee: Pat Partridge (County Durham)

=== Replay ===
4 April 1979

Liverpool	0–1	Manchester United
		J. Greenhoff

Goodison Park, Liverpool
Referee: David Richardson (Great Harwood, Lancashire)

== Final ==
12 May 1979

Arsenal	3–2	Manchester United
Talbot 12'; Stapleton 43'; Sunderland 89'	(Report)	McQueen 86'; McIlroy 88'

Wembley, London
Attendance: 100,000
Referee: Ron Challis (Kent)

Arsenal	Manchester United

== Television coverage ==
The right to show FA Cup games were, as with Football League matches, shared between the BBC and ITV network. All games were shown in a highlights format, except the Final, which was shown live both on BBC1 & ITV. The BBC football highlights programme Match of the Day would show up to three games and the various ITV regional network stations would cover up to one game and show highlights from other games covered elsewhere on the ITV network. No games from Rounds 1 or 2 were shown. Occasional highlights of replays would be shown on either the BBC or ITV.

These matches were.

Round	BBC1	ITV
Third round proper	Leicester City v Norwich City ^{1} Shrewsbury Town v Cambridge United; Southend United v Liverpool ^{2}	Sheffield Wednesday v Arsenal – Yorkshire ^{1} Stoke City v Oldham Athletic – ATV (abandoned) ^{1}
Fourth round proper	Shrewsbury Town v Manchester City ^{1} Arsenal v Notts County ^{1}	Newcastle United v Wolverhampton Wanderers – Yorkshire ^{1} Nottingham Forest v York City – ATV; Ipswich Town v Orient – Anglia ^{1} Fulham v Manchester United ^{3} Manchester United v Fulham ^{3} (Replay); Wrexham v Tottenham Hotspur ^{3} (Replay)
Fifth round proper	Nottingham Forest v Arsenal^{2}	
Sixth round proper	Manchester United v Tottenham Hotspur ^{1,2} (Replay)	Wolverhampton Wanderers v Shrewsbury Town – ATV ^{1} Tottenham Hotspur v Manchester United – LWT
Semi-finals	Arsenal v Wolverhampton Wanderers; Liverpool v Manchester United^{2} (Replay) ^{1}	Manchester United vs Liverpool – Granada shown in All Regions^{1}
Final	Arsenal vs Manchester United ^{1}	Arsenal vs Manchester United ^{1}

^{1}Footage available on YouTube
^{2}featured on Sportsnight
^{3}featured on Midweek Sports Special
