= Arnie Sidebottom =

English footballer and cricketer

Personal information
- Date of birth: 1 April 1954 (age 72)
- Place of birth: Shawlands, Barnsley, England
- Position: Defender

Senior career*
Years	Team	Apps	(Gls)
1972–1975	Manchester United	16	(0)
1975–1978	Huddersfield Town	61	(5)
1978–1979	Halifax Town	21	(2)
Total		98	(7)
- * Club domestic league appearances and goals

Arnie Sidebottom
Personal information
- Full name: Arnold Sidebottom
- Born: 1 April 1954 (age 72); Shawlands, Barnsley, England
- Height: 6 ft 2 in (1.88 m)
- Bowling: Right-arm fast-medium
- Role: Bowler
- Relatives: RJ Sidebottom (son)

International information
- National side: England
- Only Test (cap 512): 11 July 1985 v Australia

Domestic team information
- Years: Team
- 1973–1991: Yorkshire
- 1981–1984: Orange Free State

Career statistics
Competition	Test	FC	LA
Matches	1	228	240
Runs scored	2	4508	1304
Batting average	2.00	22.42	14.98
100s/50s	–/–	1/13	–/1
Top score	2	124	52*
Balls bowled	112	30645	11399
Wickets	1	596	264
Bowling average	65.00	24.42	26.65
5 wickets in innings	–	23	2
10 wickets in match	–	3	–
Best bowling	1/65	8/72	5/27
Catches/stumpings	–/–	63/–	51/–
- Source: CricketArchive, 16 April 2010

Arnold Sidebottom (born 1 April 1954) is an English former footballer and cricketer, who played cricket for Yorkshire and played one Test match for England.

== Football ==
Sidebottom was born in Shawlands, Barnsley, Yorkshire, and started off as a professional footballer, playing as a central defender. He joined Manchester United as an amateur in January 1971, and turned professional in 1972. He was paid £22 per week. He replaced the injured Jim Holton during the 1974–75 season in the Second Division. He helped United win the Second Division Championship in that season, but was transferred in January 1976 to Huddersfield Town, after making 20 appearances for United. He later played for Halifax Town.

== Cricket ==
Sidebottom also had a cricketing career, and first played for Yorkshire in 1973, but did not win his county cap until 1980. The county's fortunes on the field were adversely affected during his career by in-fighting and by its own regulations, which prevented the fielding of players born from outside of the county; the county only signed its first overseas-born player (Sachin Tendulkar) as Sidebottom's career was coming to an end. A rare highlight came in 1987 when the county won the limited-over Benson and Hedges Cup, Sidebottom being at the wicket in the final as the win was secured.

Test match cricket seemed to have passed him by when he went to South Africa as part of the rebel tour led by Graham Gooch in 1982, which also earned him a three-year Test ban. He also played for Orange Free State. After the ban ended, he was a surprise call up for the Trent Bridge Test in 1985 against Australia, where he took 1 for 65 before limping off injured. His only wicket was that of Bob Holland. Sidebottom himself admitted that his Test selection came when he was past his prime.

== Coaching career ==
Sidebottom continued playing for Yorkshire until 1991, and then went into coaching. He finally left Yorkshire in 2003. He now coaches pupils at Woodhouse Grove School, West Yorkshire, in football and cricket, as well as coaching young cricketers at Thongsbridge Cricket Club and the Ryan Sidebottom Cricket Academy.

== Personal life ==
Sidebottom's son, Ryan, is also a former professional cricketer. A left-arm fast bowler, he has played cricket for both Yorkshire and Nottinghamshire, and has also represented England in both Tests and One Day Internationals. He retired from international cricket in September 2010 and domestic cricket in 2017.

== See also ==
- One Test Wonder
