= Tony Grimshaw =

English footballer

Personal information
- Full name: Anthony Grimshaw
- Date of birth: 8 December 1957 (age 68)
- Place of birth: Manchester, England
- Height: 5 ft 6 1/2 in (1.69 m)
- Position: Full back

Youth career
- 1974: Manchester United

Senior career*
Years	Team	Apps	(Gls)
1974–1979	Manchester United	1	(0)
1979–1980	Mossley	22	(4)
- * Club domestic league appearances and goals

Anthony Grimshaw (born 8 December 1957) is an English former footballer. His regular position was at full back. He was born in Manchester. He played professionally for Manchester United – for whom he made one league appearance during the 1975–76 season.

Grimshaw joined Manchester United as an apprentice in April 1974, turning professional in December of the same year. His first team debut came in the League Cup in September 1975, a 2–1 win at home to Brentford. He also made one league appearance, but after that did not feature again in the United first team. He was released at the end of the 1978–79 season and joined non-league Mossley, where he played 22 times the following season.
