= Stewart Houston =

Scottish football player and manager (born 1949)

Personal information
- Full name: Stewart Mackie Houston
- Date of birth: 20 August 1949 (age 77)
- Place of birth: Dunoon, Argyll, Scotland
- Position: Left back

Youth career
- Port Glasgow Rangers
- Chelsea

Senior career*
Years	Team	Apps	(Gls)
1967–1972	Chelsea	9	(0)
1972	→ Brentford (loan)	15	(2)
1972–1973	Brentford	62	(7)
1973–1980	Manchester United	205	(13)
1980–1983	Sheffield United	94	(1)
1983–1986	Colchester United	107	(5)
Total		492	(28)

International career
1975	Scotland	1	(0)

Managerial career
- 1995: Arsenal (caretaker)
- 1996: Arsenal (caretaker)
- 1996–1997: Queens Park Rangers
- * Club domestic league appearances and goals

Stewart Mackie Houston (born 20 August 1949) is a Scottish former football player and coach who played as a left-back. Born in Dunoon, he began his professional career in 1967 with Chelsea, before moving to Brentford and then Manchester United, where he spent seven years. He also made one appearance for the Scotland national team in 1975.

He was George Graham's assistant at Arsenal and caretaker manager after the sackings of Graham and his replacement Bruce Rioch, and later manager of Queens Park Rangers. He then had spells as the first-team coach at Ipswich Town, Tottenham Hotspur and Walsall. Houston later worked as a scout for Arsenal.

== Career ==
A left back, Houston's first professional club was Chelsea, but he failed to break into the first team and only made 14 appearances in five years. He was sold to Brentford in 1972. A year later he signed for Manchester United for £55,000, where he made 250 appearances (plus two as substitute) and scored 16 goals.

While he was at Old Trafford, Houston helped United win the Football League Second Division in 1975 and the 1976–77 FA Cup, although he did not feature in the 1977 FA Cup Final. He joined Sheffield United in 1980, before ending his playing career with Colchester United in 1986. He also played international football for Scotland, making one appearance in 1975 against Denmark.

Houston was assistant manager to George Graham at Arsenal in 1990, and was twice the club's caretaker-manager: first for three months in 1995 after Graham's sacking in February 1995. Houston took his team to the final of the European Cup Winners' Cup, but the Gunners lost to a last-minute goal from Nayim.

Arsenal appointed Bruce Rioch in the summer of 1995, but Houston stayed on as his assistant. Just over a year after his appointment, Rioch was sacked, and Houston was reappointed as caretaker. Arsène Wenger was identified as Rioch's successor in August, but Arsenal were forced to wait as Wenger was contracted to Japanese club Grampus Eight. Houston left Arsenal in mid-September to become manager of Queens Park Rangers, where he appointed Bruce Rioch as his assistant. QPR had just been relegated to the First Division and were aiming for a return to the Premier League. Houston and Rioch were sacked by QPR in November 1997, with the club sitting 13th in the First Division.

Houston then went to Ipswich Town as George Burley's first team coach, but was later reunited with George Graham in March 1999 when Graham appointed him assistant manager at Tottenham Hotspur. Houston was fired two years later. after Graham was sacked in March 2001. He then spent a brief period as first-team coach of Walsall. Houston also worked as a scout for Arsenal from 2008 to 2020.

== Honours ==
=== Player ===
Brentford

- Football League Fourth Division promotion: 1971–72

Manchester United

- Football League Second Division: 1974–75
- FA Cup runner-up: 1975–76

Sheffield United

- Football League Fourth Division: 1981–82

Individual

- PFA Team of the Year: 1974–75 Second Division

=== Manager ===
Arsenal

- UEFA Cup Winners' Cup runner-up: 1994–95

Individual

- Football League First Division Manager of the Month: September 1997
