= Steve James (footballer) =

English footballer

Personal information
- Full name: Steven Robert James
- Date of birth: 29 November 1949 (age 76)
- Place of birth: Coseley, England
- Position: Centre-back

Youth career
- 1965–1966: Manchester United

Senior career*
| Years | Team | Apps | (Gls) |
| 1966–1976 | Manchester United | 129 | (4) |
| 1976–1980 | York City | 105 | (1) |
| 1980–1982 | Kidderminster Harriers | | |
| 1982– | Tipton Town | | |

International career
| 1968 | England Youth | | |
- * Club domestic league appearances and goals

Steven Robert James (born 29 November 1949) is an English former professional footballer who played at centre-back.

== Career ==
Born in Coseley, England, James started his career as an apprentice at Manchester United in December 1965. His first-team debut for the club came on 12 October 1968 against Liverpool. He scored four goals in 161 appearances (including one substitute appearance) during his United career before being transferred to York City in January 1976. During his time at Old Trafford, he collected a Football League Second Division title medal in 1975 but then lost his place in the first team and this prompted his move to Bootham Crescent.

He made his debut for York against West Bromwich Albion in January 1976. He missed the whole of the 1978–79 season with injury. He made 119 appearances and scored 2 goals for the club, and joined non-league Kidderminster Harriers in May 1980.

He was capped for England at youth international level in 1968. As of June 2012, he was working in a Waitrose supermarket. His Division 2 winners' medal was found in a junior school near Telford in January 2012, having been missing for over 30 years.

== Honours ==
Manchester United

- Football League Second Division: 1974–75
