= Jim Holton =

Scottish footballer (1951–1993)

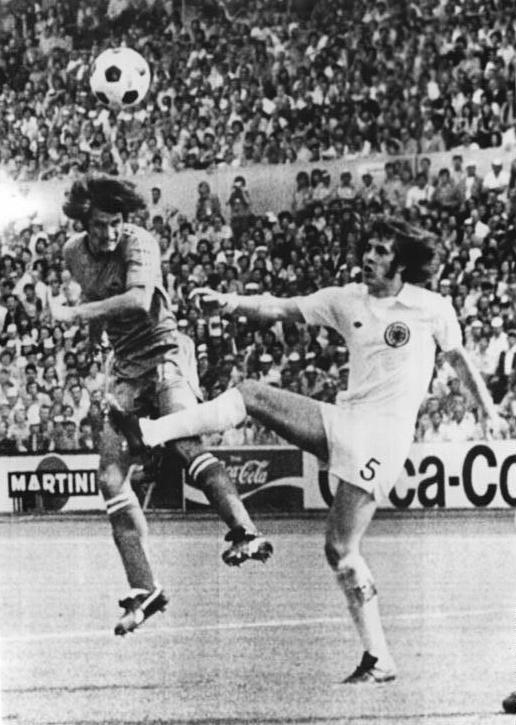
- Holton (white shirt and shorts, #5) playing for Scotland in the 1974 FIFA World Cup

Personal information
- Full name: James Allan Holton
- Date of birth: 11 April 1951
- Place of birth: Lesmahagow, Scotland
- Date of death: 4 October 1993 (aged 42)
- Place of death: Baginton, England
- Position: Centre-back

Youth career
- Celtic
- 1968–1971: West Bromwich Albion

Senior career*
Years	Team	Apps	(Gls)
1971–1972	Shrewsbury Town	67	(4)
1972–1976	Manchester United	63	(5)
1976	Miami Toros	16	(1)
1976–1977	Sunderland	15	(0)
1977–1980	Coventry City	91	(0)
1980	Detroit Express	21	(3)
1980–1981	Sheffield Wednesday	0	(0)
Total		273	(13)

International career
1973–1974	Scotland	15	(2)
- * Club domestic league appearances and goals

James Allan Holton (11 April 1951 – 4 October 1993) was a Scottish footballer who played as a centre-back. Holton played for Shrewsbury Town, Manchester United, Miami Toros, Sunderland, Coventry City and Detroit Express.

He played in 15 international matches for Scotland scoring two goals. One of those goals came in a win against Czechoslovakia that helped Scotland qualify for the 1974 FIFA World Cup. He played in all three Scotland games at that tournament.

== Playing career ==
=== Early years ===
Holton was born in Lesmahagow, South Lanarkshire, and trained with Celtic as a youngster but was not offered a contract. At the age of 16 Holton had trials with West Bromwich Albion who signed him as an amateur in December 1967. He then signed a professional contract four months later. He progressed steadily through the junior and youth teams over the next three years. However he never made it past playing for their reserve side in the Central League. At the end of the 1970–71 season he was released by the club.

=== Shrewsbury Town ===
Holton was quickly signed by former Manchester United goalkeeper Harry Gregg who was managing Shrewsbury Town in England's third tier. Gregg had been impressed watching Holton in the West Bromwich Albion reserve team. Gregg told Holton when he signed him, "You're going to make it. I'm sure you can make it right to the top too." Holton made his Shrewsbury debut at Bournemouth on the opening day of the 1971–72 season. He quickly became a first-team regular.

Shrewsbury sent a letter to the Scottish Football Association to notify new Scotland manager Tommy Docherty that Holton may be of interest for the Scotland national under-23 team. Docherty watched Holton play at Gay Meadow. By the end of his spell at Shrewsbury Holton had appeared in 67 league games scoring four goals.

=== Manchester United ===
In December 1972 Docherty replaced Frank O'Farrell managing struggling Manchester United near the bottom of England's top flight. On 10 January 1973 he signed the now 20-year-old Holton for £80,000. Near unbeatable in the air and aggressive in the tackle, he offered a formidable physical presence that compensated for his lack of delicacy in possession of the ball. He was criticised by some opposing fans for his combative ways. At United he was a favourite among fans who taunted opponents with the chant: Six foot two, eyes of blue, Big Jim Holton's after you. This was despite Holton being 6 ft 1 in (1.85 m) and having brown eyes.

United were relegated in 1974, the season after Holton's arrival. Holton then broke his leg after 15 minutes in the 4–4 draw against Sheffield Wednesday on 7 December 1974. He broke his leg a second time when making his comeback in the reserves. Others took advantage of his absence to establish themselves in the first team with United now sweeping all aside in the league. They won promotion straight back up to the top flight at the first attempt. He played in 63 league games for United scoring five goals in those games. After the leg break he never played for the Manchester United first team again. This was despite being at Old Trafford a further 18 months.

=== Miami Toros and Sunderland ===
In the summer of 1976 Holton played for the Miami Toros of the North American Soccer League (NASL). He played 16 games scoring once.

He then moved to Sunderland on loan in September 1976 before transferring to Sunderland permanently the following month for a fee of £40,000. He stayed six months until March 1977 playing 15 league games for the Wearsiders.

=== Coventry City, Detroit Express and Sheffield Wednesday ===
He stayed in England's top flight with a transfer to Coventry City. He debuted on 19 April 1977 in a 1–1 draw at home to his former club, West Brom. Holton featured in eight league games that season as Coventry fought out a relegation battle. Coventry were in a three-way dogfight to stay up that involved their final-day opponents, Bristol City. Kick-off was delayed due to the large crowd. Some reports alleged the kick-off was intentionally delayed by Coventry chairman Jimmy Hill. Holton's former club, Sunderland, lost away to Everton. This meant a draw between Coventry and Bristol City at Highfield Road would keep both of those sides up and relegate Sunderland. News of Sunderland's defeat was displayed on the Highfield Road scoreboard with the score 2–2 at the time between. Both teams then tamely played out a mutually beneficial draw.

In Holton's first full season with Coventry the Sky Blues finished seventh in the First Division. this was their second-highest ever league finish narrowly missing out on a UEFA Cup place. In a little over three years with Coventry Holton made 91 league appearances.

He returned to the NASL for a spell with the Detroit Express in 1980. He played 21 games scoring three goals. This was to be his last time playing first team senior football.

His last senior club was Sheffield Wednesday but due to injury he never played for their first team.

=== International ===
Holton collected 15 full international caps scoring twice for Scotland between May 1973 and October 1974. He made his full international debut in a 2–0 win against Wales in their first match of the 1972–73 British Home Championship. In a 1974 FIFA World Cup qualification match against Czechoslovakia at Hampden Park on 26 September 1973, Holton scored the equalising goal in a 2–1 win for Scotland. Joe Jordan scored the winning goal, as Scotland qualified for their first World Cup finals since 1958.

Holton put Scotland ahead in a 1–1 draw against West Germany on 14 November 1973. The friendly at Hampden Park was one of three games to mark the centenary of the Scottish Football Association. Holton played in all three group games for Scotland at the 1974 FIFA World Cup in West Germany. They won 2–0 against Zaire, drew 0–0 with then-reigning champions Brazil and 1–1 with Yugoslavia. Scotland were unbeaten but failed to progress to the second round due to inferior goal difference.

Holton played for Scotland on 30 October 1974 in a 3–0 friendly win over East Germany at Hampden Park. Less than six weeks after the East Germany game, Holton suffered his leg break at Manchester United. He never played for Scotland again after that making the East Germany cap his last. Scotland's record with Holton playing was eight wins, three draws and four defeats.

== After playing ==
Holton stayed in Coventry after retiring from professional football, working as a pub landlord at The Rising Sun and then The Old Stag in the city centre. He died on 4 October 1993, aged 42. He had been for a run in the countryside around Baginton and suffered a heart attack shortly afterwards when at the wheel of his car. His funeral was attended by over 1,000 people including John Sillett, Steve Ogrizovic, Tommy Docherty and Joe Jordan. He was survived by his wife and two children.

== Career statistics ==
=== International appearances ===
International statistics
National team	Year	Apps	Goals
Scotland
Scotland	1973	7	2
Scotland	1974	8	0
Total		15	2

=== International goals ===
Scores and results list Scotland's goal tally first.

#	Date	Venue	Opponent	Score	Result	Competition
1	26 September 1973	Hampden Park, Glasgow	Czechoslovakia	1–1	2–1	WCQG8
2	14 November 1973	Hampden Park, Glasgow	West Germany	1–0	1–1	Friendly

== Honours ==
Manchester United

- Football League Second Division: 1974–75

Scotland

- British Home Championship: 1973–74 (shared)
