= Tony Young (footballer) =

English footballer (1952–2024)

Personal information
- Full name: Terrence Young
- Date of birth: 24 December 1952
- Place of birth: Urmston, Lancashire, England
- Date of death: 4 December 2024 (aged 71)
- Height: 1.78 m (5 ft 10 in)
- Position: Full-back

Youth career
- Manchester United

Senior career*
Years	Team	Apps	(Gls)
1969–1976	Manchester United	83	(1)
1976	Charlton Athletic	20	(1)
1976–1978	York City	78	(2)
–	Runcorn		
- * Club domestic league appearances and goals

Terrence Young (24 December 1952 – December 2024) was an English footballer who made 181 appearances in the Football League playing as a full-back for Manchester United, Charlton Athletic and York City. Young died in December 2024, at the age of 71.
