= 1974–75 Football League =

76th season of the Football League

The Football League
- Season: 1974–75
- Champions: Derby County

The 1974–75 season was the 76th completed season of The Football League.

Dave Mackay guided Derby County to their second league title in four years having overcome strong competition from Liverpool, Ipswich Town, Everton, Stoke City, Sheffield United and Middlesbrough in a title race which went right to the wire. There was disappointment at Bramall Lane after Sheffield United's title challenge ended in failure without even a UEFA Cup place, but this would be as good as it got for the Blades as a sharp decline soon set in and within a few seasons had pushed them into the Fourth Division.

Carlisle United, in the First Division for the first time, topped the league three games into the season but were unable to maintain their good start and were eventually relegated in bottom place. Joining the Cumbrians in the drop zone were Luton Town and Chelsea.

Brian Clough was named as Don Revie's successor at Leeds United but was dismissed after just 44 days in charge. He was replaced by Jimmy Armfield.

Manchester United's directors kept faith in Tommy Docherty after their relegation to the Second Division, and he rewarded them with the Second Division championship to return immediately to the top flight. They were joined by Aston Villa (who also won the League Cup) and Norwich City. Docherty had built a new-look team containing players such as Jim Holton, Stuart Pearson and Brian Greenhoff. Meanwhile, FIFA finally lifted George Best's worldwide ban from football; however, Docherty was not prepared to give him another chance at Old Trafford and he joined Stockport County on a free transfer.

Millwall, Cardiff City and Sheffield Wednesday were the three unlucky clubs who were unable to escape the Second Division drop zone. In the space of a few years, Sheffield Wednesday had slumped to the Third Division having previously been a strong First Division side.

Blackburn Rovers, Plymouth Argyle and Charlton Athletic occupied the three promotion places in the Third Division.

Going down were AFC Bournemouth, Tranmere Rovers, Watford and Huddersfield Town. This meant that Huddersfield would be playing Fourth Division football for the first time in their history, the first former English champions so to do. Watford, meanwhile, were enduring their last unsuccessful season for many years to come.

Mansfield Town, Shrewsbury Town, Rotherham United and Chester occupied the four promotion places in the Fourth Division. Chester had finally managed promotion after 44 years of league membership, narrowly edging out Lincoln City on goal average.

Scunthorpe United, who had narrowly missed out on top-division football during the 1960s, found themselves bottom of the league but retained their league status after being re-elected along with the three clubs placed above them.

== Final league tables and results ==
The tables and results below are reproduced here in the exact form that they can be found at The Rec.Sport.Soccer Statistics Foundation website and in Rothmans Book of Football League Records 1888–89 to 1978–79, with home and away statistics separated.

Beginning with the season 1894–95, clubs finishing level on points were separated according to goal average (goals scored divided by goals conceded), or more properly put, goal ratio. In case one or more teams had the same goal difference, this system favoured those teams who had scored fewer goals. The goal average system was eventually scrapped beginning with the 1976–77 season.

Since the Fourth Division was established in the 1958–59 season, the bottom four teams of that division have been required to apply for re-election.

== First Division ==
First Division
- Season: 1974–75
- Champions: Derby County; 2nd English title
- Relegated: Luton Town; Chelsea; Carlisle United
- European Cup: Derby County
- European Cup Winners' Cup: West Ham United
- UEFA Cup: Liverpool; Ipswich Town; Everton
- Matches: 462
- Goals: 1,213 (2.63 per match)
- Top goalscorer: Malcolm Macdonald (21 goals)
- Biggest home win: Wolverhampton Wanderers 7–1 Chelsea (15 March 1975)
- Biggest away win: Luton Town 1–4 Ipswich Town (14 September 1974); Newcastle United 2–5 Tottenham Hotspur (11 January 1975); Burnley 2–5 Derby County (31 March 1975); Birmingham City 1–4 Luton Town (19 April 1975); 0–3: 7 matches
- Highest scoring: Ipswich Town 5–4 Newcastle United (15 March 1975)

A tight title race saw just five points separating the top seven sides, with Derby County finally winning the title in their first full season under the management of Dave Mackay. Liverpool finished runners-up under Bob Paisley, who had succeeded the legendary Bill Shankly at the start of the season. Ipswich Town, Everton, Stoke City, Sheffield United and newly promoted Middlesbrough completed the top seven.

Despite the close nature of the final table; most pundits had dubbed Everton Champions elect going into the closing stages. The Merseysiders had lost just four games all season, topped the table and appeared to have a relatively trouble-free run-in mostly against teams in the bottom half of the table. The pressure of the title being theirs to lose appeared to get to the Toffeemen who inexplicably lost four of their last nine games, three of which, against Luton, Carlisle, who would ultimately be relegated, and Sheffield United in a game they had led 2-0 in at half time, ultimately costing them the title. Liverpool also came within a hair's breadth of the title, with a 1-0 loss at Middlesbrough in the penultimate game of the season proving their undoing.

Leeds United began life without Don Revie in disastrous fashion, with Brian Clough being sacked after 44 days in charge, having won just one league game. His successor Jimmy Armfield dragged them up to ninth place in the final table and also took them to their first European Cup final, but they were on the losing side and a riot by their fans saw them banned from European competitions for three years. Arsenal finished a disappointing 16th in the league, one of their lowest finishes in more than half a century of unbroken First Division membership. Their North London rivals Tottenham Hotspur finished just one place and one point above the relegation zone. Luton Town's First Division comeback ended in relegation after just one season, while financial problems contributed to Chelsea's relegation and the end of their 12-year run in the First Division. Carlisle United had an incredible start to their first season in the First Division, topping the league after winning their first three games, but were eventually relegated in bottom place.

Pos	Team	Pld	W	D	L	GF	GA	GAv	Pts	Qualification or relegation
1	Derby County (C)	42	21	11	10	67	49	1.367	53	Qualification for the European Cup first round
2	Liverpool	42	20	11	11	60	39	1.538	51	Qualification for the UEFA Cup first round
3	Ipswich Town	42	23	5	14	66	44	1.500	51	Qualification for the UEFA Cup first round
4	Everton	42	16	18	8	56	42	1.333	50	Qualification for the UEFA Cup first round
5	Stoke City	42	17	15	10	64	48	1.333	49	
6	Sheffield United	42	18	13	11	58	51	1.137	49	
7	Middlesbrough	42	18	12	12	54	40	1.350	48	
8	Manchester City	42	18	10	14	54	54	1.000	46	
9	Leeds United	42	16	13	13	57	49	1.163	45	
10	Burnley	42	17	11	14	68	67	1.015	45	
11	Queens Park Rangers	42	16	10	16	54	54	1.000	42	
12	Wolverhampton Wanderers	42	14	11	17	57	54	1.056	39	
13	West Ham United	42	13	13	16	58	59	0.983	39	Qualification for the European Cup Winners' Cup first round (Note: West Ham United qualified for the European Cup Winners' Cup as the 1974-75 FA Cup winners.)
14	Coventry City	42	12	15	15	51	62	0.823	39	
15	Newcastle United	42	15	9	18	59	72	0.819	39	
16	Arsenal	42	13	11	18	47	49	0.959	37	
17	Birmingham City	42	14	9	19	53	61	0.869	37	
18	Leicester City	42	12	12	18	46	60	0.767	36	
19	Tottenham Hotspur	42	13	8	21	52	63	0.825	34	
20	Luton Town (R)	42	11	11	20	47	65	0.723	33	Relegation to the Second Division
21	Chelsea (R)	42	9	15	18	42	72	0.583	33	Relegation to the Second Division
22	Carlisle United (R)	42	12	5	25	43	59	0.729	29	Relegation to the Second Division

Source: World Football
Rules for classification: 1) Points; 2) Goal average; 3) Goals scored
(C) Champions; (R) Relegated

=== Results ===
Home \ Away	ARS	BIR	BUR	CRL	CHE	COV	DER	EVE	IPS	LEE	LEI	LIV	LUT	MCI	MID	NEW	QPR	SHU	STK	TOT	WHU	WOL
Arsenal		1–1	0–1	2–1	1–2	2–0	3–1	0–2	0–1	1–2	0–0	2–0	2–2	4–0	2–0	3–0	2–2	1–0	1–1	1–0	3–0	0–0
Birmingham	3–1		1–1	2–0	2–0	1–2	3–2	0–3	0–1	1–0	3–4	3–1	1–4	4–0	0–3	3–0	4–1	0–0	0–3	1–0	1–1	1–1
Burnley	3–3	2–2		2–1	1–2	3–0	2–5	1–1	1–0	2–1	2–0	1–1	1–0	2–1	1–1	4–1	3–0	2–1	0–0	3–2	3–5	1–2
Carlisle United	2–1	1–0	4–2		1–2	0–0	3–0	3–0	2–1	1–2	0–1	0–1	1–2	0–0	0–1	1–2	1–2	0–1	0–2	1–0	0–1	1–0
Chelsea	0–0	2–1	3–3	0–2		3–3	1–2	1–1	0–0	0–2	0–0	0–3	2–0	0–1	1–2	3–2	0–3	1–1	3–3	1–0	1–1	0–1
Coventry City	3–0	1–0	0–3	2–1	1–3		1–1	1–1	3–1	1–3	2–2	1–1	2–1	2–2	0–2	2–0	1–1	2–2	2–0	1–1	1–1	2–1
Derby County	2–1	2–1	3–2	0–0	4–1	1–1		0–1	2–0	0–0	1–0	2–0	5–0	2–1	2–3	2–2	5–2	2–0	1–2	3–1	1–0	1–0
Everton	2–1	4–1	1–1	2–3	1–1	1–0	0–0		1–1	3–2	3–0	0–0	3–1	2–0	1–1	1–1	2–1	2–3	2–1	1–0	1–1	0–0
Ipswich Town	3–0	3–2	2–0	3–1	2–0	4–0	3–0	1–0		0–0	2–1	1–0	0–1	1–1	2–0	5–4	2–1	0–1	3–1	4–0	4–1	2–0
Leeds United	2–0	1–0	2–2	3–1	2–0	0–0	0–1	0–0	2–1		2–2	0–2	1–1	2–2	2–2	1–1	0–1	5–1	3–1	2–1	2–1	2–0
Leicester City	0–1	1–1	1–0	1–1	1–1	0–1	0–0	0–2	0–1	0–2		1–1	0–0	1–0	1–0	4–0	3–1	3–0	1–1	1–2	3–0	3–2
Liverpool	1–3	1–0	0–1	2–0	2–2	2–1	2–2	0–0	5–2	1–0	2–1		2–0	4–1	2–0	4–0	3–1	0–0	3–0	5–2	1–1	2–0
Luton Town	2–0	1–3	2–3	3–1	1–1	1–3	1–0	2–1	1–4	2–1	3–0	1–2		1–1	0–1	1–0	1–1	0–1	0–0	1–1	0–0	3–2
Manchester City	2–1	3–1	2–0	1–2	1–1	1–0	1–2	2–1	1–1	2–1	4–1	2–0	1–0		2–1	5–1	1–0	3–2	1–0	1–0	4–0	0–0
Middlesbrough	0–0	3–0	2–0	0–2	1–1	4–4	1–1	2–0	3–0	0–1	3–0	1–0	1–1	3–0		0–0	1–3	1–0	2–0	3–0	0–0	2–1
Newcastle United	3–1	1–2	3–0	1–0	5–0	3–2	0–2	0–1	1–0	3–0	0–1	4–1	1–0	2–1	2–1		2–2	2–2	2–2	2–5	2–0	0–0
Queens Park Rangers	0–0	0–1	0–1	2–1	1–0	2–0	4–1	2–2	1–0	1–1	4–2	0–1	2–1	2–0	0–0	1–2		1–0	0–1	0–1	0–2	2–0
Sheffield United	1–1	3–2	2–2	2–1	2–1	1–0	1–2	2–2	3–1	1–1	4–0	1–0	1–1	1–1	1–0	2–1	1–1		2–0	0–1	3–2	1–0
Stoke City	0–2	0–0	2–0	5–2	3–0	2–0	1–1	1–1	1–2	3–0	1–0	2–0	4–2	4–0	1–1	0–0	1–0	3–2		2–2	2–1	2–2
Tottenham Hotspur	2–0	0–0	2–3	1–1	2–0	1–1	2–0	1–1	0–1	4–2	0–3	0–2	2–1	1–2	1–2	3–0	1–2	1–3	0–2		2–1	3–0
West Ham United	1–0	3–0	2–1	2–0	0–1	1–2	2–2	2–3	1–0	2–1	6–2	0–0	2–0	0–0	3–0	0–1	2–2	1–2	2–2	1–1		5–2
Wolverhampton Wanderers	1–0	0–1	4–2	2–0	7–1	2–0	0–1	2–0	2–1	1–1	1–1	0–0	5–2	1–0	2–0	4–2	1–2	1–1	2–2	2–3	3–1	

Updated to match(es) played on unknown. Source: Ian Laschke: Rothmans Book of Football League Records 1888–89 to 1978–79. Macdonald and Jane’s, London & Sydney, 1980.
Legend: Blue = home team win; Yellow = draw; Red = away team win.

=== Maps ===
Locations of the Football League First Division London teams 1974–1975
Locations of the Football League First Division 1974–1975 teams

== Second Division ==
Second Division
- Season: 1974–75
- Champions: Manchester United
- Promoted: Manchester United; Aston Villa; Norwich City
- Relegated: Millwall; Cardiff City; Sheffield Wednesday
- UEFA Cup: Aston Villa
- Matches: 462
- Goals: 1,036 (2.24 per match)
- Top goalscorer: Brian Little (20 goals)
- Biggest home win: Aston Villa 6–0 Hull City (26 April 1975)
- Biggest away win: Oxford United 0–4 Southampton (25 September 1974); Sheffield Wednesday 0–4 Aston Villa (23 April 1975)
- Highest scoring: Sheffield Wednesday 4–4 Manchester United (7 December 1974)

Tommy Docherty responded to the loyalty of the Manchester United directors who kept faith in him after their first relegation in nearly 40 years by delivering an return to the First Division, as his young side were crowned champions of the Second Division. Aston Villa ended their eight-year absence from the top flight by finishing runners-up, being divisional top scorers and also lifting the League Cup, in the final of which they beat Norwich City, who finished third in the league and so clinched the final promotion place.

Sunderland and Bristol City just missed out on promotion, while ninth placed Fulham partly compensated for a lack of a serious promotion challenge by reaching their first ever FA Cup final, although they lost to West Ham United. Nottingham Forest looked to build for a better future and end their spell of Second Division struggle by appointing Brian Clough as manager in January.

Sheffield Wednesday were relegated to the Third Division for the first time in their history after a terrible season in which they managed only five league wins. They finished 14 points adrift of safety and went down along with Millwall and Cardiff City.

Pos	Team	Pld	W	D	L	GF	GA	GAv	Pts	Qualification or relegation
1	Manchester United (C, P)	42	26	9	7	66	30	2.200	61	Promotion to the First Division
2	Aston Villa (P)	42	25	8	9	79	32	2.469	58	UEFA Cup first round and promotion to the First Division (Note: Aston Villa qualified for the UEFA Cup as the 1974–75 Football League Cup winners.)
3	Norwich City (P)	42	20	13	9	58	37	1.568	53	Promotion to the First Division
4	Sunderland	42	19	13	10	65	35	1.857	51	
5	Bristol City	42	21	8	13	47	33	1.424	50	
6	West Bromwich Albion	42	18	9	15	54	42	1.286	45	
7	Blackpool	42	14	17	11	38	33	1.152	45	
8	Hull City	42	15	14	13	40	53	0.755	44	
9	Fulham	42	13	16	13	44	39	1.128	42	
10	Bolton Wanderers	42	15	12	15	45	41	1.098	42	
11	Oxford United	42	15	12	15	41	51	0.804	42	
12	Orient	42	11	20	11	28	39	0.718	42	
13	Southampton	42	15	11	16	53	54	0.981	41	
14	Notts County	42	12	16	14	49	59	0.831	40	
15	York City	42	14	10	18	51	55	0.927	38	
16	Nottingham Forest	42	12	14	16	43	55	0.782	38	
17	Portsmouth	42	12	13	17	44	54	0.815	37	
18	Oldham Athletic	42	10	15	17	40	48	0.833	35	
19	Bristol Rovers	42	12	11	19	42	64	0.656	35	
20	Millwall (R)	42	10	12	20	44	56	0.786	32	Relegation to the Third Division
21	Cardiff City (R)	42	9	14	19	36	62	0.581	32	Relegation to the Third Division
22	Sheffield Wednesday (R)	42	5	11	26	29	64	0.453	21	Relegation to the Third Division

Rules for classification: 1) Points; 2) Goal average; 3) Goals scored
(C) Champions; (P) Promoted; (R) Relegated

=== Results ===
Home \ Away	AST	BLP	BOL	BRI	BRR	CAR	FUL	HUL	MUN	MIL	NWC	NOT	NTC	OLD	ORI	OXF	POR	SHW	SOU	SUN	WBA	YOR
Aston Villa		1–0	0–0	2–0	1–0	2–0	1–1	6–0	2–0	3–0	1–1	3–0	0–1	5–0	3–1	0–0	2–0	3–1	3–0	2–0	3–1	4–0
Blackpool	0–3		2–1	2–0	0–0	4–0	1–0	1–2	0–3	1–0	2–1	0–0	3–1	1–0	0–0	0–0	2–2	3–1	3–0	3–2	2–0	1–1
Bolton Wanderers	1–0	0–0		0–2	5–1	2–1	0–0	1–1	0–1	2–0	0–0	2–0	1–1	1–1	2–0	3–1	3–0	0–1	3–2	0–2	0–1	1–1
Bristol City	1–0	0–1	2–1		1–1	0–0	3–1	2–0	1–0	2–1	0–1	1–0	3–0	3–1	0–0	3–0	3–1	1–0	2–0	1–1	2–1	0–0
Bristol Rovers	2–0	1–3	1–0	1–4		1–0	1–2	2–0	1–1	2–0	0–2	4–2	0–0	2–1	0–0	1–0	0–1	1–1	0–1	2–1	2–1	1–3
Cardiff City	3–1	1–1	1–2	0–1	2–2		0–0	1–2	0–1	0–1	2–1	2–1	0–0	3–1	0–0	1–1	1–0	0–0	2–2	2–0	0–2	3–2
Fulham	3–1	1–0	2–1	1–1	0–0	4–0		1–1	1–2	0–0	4–0	0–1	3–0	0–0	0–0	0–0	2–2	2–1	3–2	1–3	1–0	0–2
Hull City	1–1	1–0	2–0	1–0	2–0	1–1	2–1		2–0	1–1	0–0	1–3	1–0	1–1	0–0	1–0	0–0	1–0	1–1	3–1	1–0	2–0
Manchester United	2–1	4–0	3–0	0–1	2–0	4–0	1–0	2–0		4–0	1–1	2–2	1–0	3–2	0–0	4–0	2–1	2–0	1–0	3–2	2–1	2–1
Millwall	1–3	0–0	1–1	1–0	1–1	5–1	2–0	2–0	0–1		1–1	3–0	3–0	0–0	1–1	0–0	0–0	2–1	4–0	1–4	2–2	1–3
Norwich City	1–4	2–1	2–0	3–2	0–1	1–1	1–2	1–0	2–0	2–0		3–0	3–0	1–0	2–0	1–0	2–0	1–1	1–0	0–0	3–2	2–3
Nottingham Forest	2–3	0–0	2–3	0–0	1–0	0–0	1–1	4–0	0–1	2–1	1–3		0–2	1–0	2–2	1–2	1–2	1–0	0–0	1–1	2–1	2–1
Notts County	1–3	0–0	1–1	1–2	3–2	0–2	1–1	5–0	2–2	2–1	1–1	2–2		1–0	1–1	4–1	1–1	3–3	3–2	0–0	0–0	2–1
Oldham Athletic	1–2	1–0	1–0	2–0	3–4	4–0	1–0	0–1	1–0	1–1	2–2	2–0	1–0		0–0	1–1	2–0	2–1	1–1	0–0	0–0	2–3
Orient	1–0	0–0	0–0	1–0	1–0	1–1	0–0	0–0	0–2	2–1	0–3	1–1	0–1	3–1		1–1	1–1	1–0	2–1	1–1	0–2	1–0
Oxford United	1–2	0–0	2–1	2–0	2–1	1–0	2–1	3–1	1–0	3–1	2–1	1–1	1–2	1–0	1–2		1–0	1–0	0–4	1–0	1–1	3–1
Portsmouth	2–3	0–0	2–0	0–1	3–0	2–2	0–0	1–1	0–0	1–0	0–3	2–0	1–1	1–1	3–0	2–1		1–0	1–2	4–2	1–3	1–0
Sheffield Wednesday	0–4	0–0	0–2	1–1	1–1	1–2	1–0	2–1	4–4	0–1	0–1	2–3	0–1	1–1	0–1	1–1	0–2		0–1	0–2	0–0	3–0
Southampton	0–0	1–1	0–1	0–1	3–0	2–0	0–0	3–3	0–1	3–2	1–1	0–1	3–2	1–0	4–2	2–1	2–1	0–1		1–1	1–0	2–1
Sunderland	0–0	1–0	0–0	3–0	5–1	3–1	1–2	1–0	0–0	2–0	0–0	0–0	3–0	2–2	3–0	2–0	4–1	3–0	3–1		3–0	2–0
West Bromwich Albion	2–0	2–0	0–1	1–0	2–2	2–0	0–1	2–2	1–1	2–1	1–1	0–1	4–1	1–0	1–0	3–0	2–1	4–0	0–3	1–0		2–0
York City	1–1	0–0	1–3	1–0	3–0	1–0	3–2	3–0	0–1	2–1	1–0	1–1	2–2	0–0	0–1	1–1	3–0	3–0	1–1	0–1	1–3	

Updated to match(es) played on unknown. Source: Ian Laschke: Rothmans Book of Football League Records 1888–89 to 1978–79. Macdonald and Jane’s, London & Sydney, 1980.
Legend: Blue = home team win; Yellow = draw; Red = away team win.

=== Maps ===
Locations of the Football League Second Division London teams 1974–1975
Locations of the Football League Second Division 1974–1975 teams

== Third Division ==
Third Division
- Season: 1974–75
- Champions: Blackburn Rovers
- Promoted: Blackburn Rovers; Plymouth Argyle; Charlton Athletic
- Relegated: Bournemouth; Tranmere Rovers; Watford; Huddersfield Town
- Cup Winners' Cup: Wrexham
- Matches: 552
- Goals: 1,427 (2.59 per match)
- Top goalscorer: Dixie McNeil (31 goals)

Pos	Team	Pld	W	D	L	GF	GA	GAv	Pts	Qualification or relegation
1	Blackburn Rovers (C, P)	46	22	16	8	68	45	1.511	60	Promotion to the Second Division
2	Plymouth Argyle (P)	46	24	11	11	79	58	1.362	59	Promotion to the Second Division
3	Charlton Athletic (P)	46	22	11	13	76	61	1.246	55	Promotion to the Second Division
4	Swindon Town	46	21	11	14	64	58	1.103	53	
5	Crystal Palace	46	18	15	13	66	57	1.158	51	
6	Port Vale	46	18	15	13	61	54	1.130	51	
7	Peterborough United	46	19	12	15	47	53	0.887	50	
8	Walsall	46	18	13	15	67	52	1.288	49	
9	Preston North End	46	19	11	16	63	56	1.125	49	
10	Gillingham	46	17	14	15	65	60	1.083	48	
11	Colchester United	46	17	13	16	70	63	1.111	47	
12	Hereford United	46	16	14	16	64	66	0.970	46	
13	Wrexham	46	15	15	16	65	55	1.182	45	Qualification for the Cup Winners' Cup first round
14	Bury	46	16	12	18	53	50	1.060	44	
15	Chesterfield	46	16	12	18	62	66	0.939	44	
16	Grimsby Town	46	15	13	18	55	64	0.859	43	
17	Halifax Town	46	13	17	16	49	65	0.754	43	
18	Southend United	46	13	16	17	46	51	0.902	42	
19	Brighton & Hove Albion	46	16	10	20	56	64	0.875	42	
20	Aldershot	46	14	11	21	53	63	0.841	39	
21	Bournemouth (R)	46	13	12	21	44	58	0.759	38	Relegation to the Fourth Division
22	Tranmere Rovers (R)	46	14	9	23	55	57	0.965	37	Relegation to the Fourth Division
23	Watford (R)	46	10	17	19	52	75	0.693	37	Relegation to the Fourth Division
24	Huddersfield Town (R)	46	11	10	25	47	76	0.618	32	Relegation to the Fourth Division

Rules for classification: 1) Points; 2) Goal average; 3) Goals scored
(C) Champions; (P) Promoted; (R) Relegated

=== Results ===
Home \ Away	BOU	ALD	BLB	B&HA	BRY	CHA	CHF	COL	CRY	GIL	GRI	HAL	HER	HUD	PET	PLY	PTV	PNE	STD	SWI	TRA	WAL	WAT	WRE
AFC Bournemouth		1–0	0–0	2–0	2–1	1–2	0–0	0–2	4–0	2–0	0–1	0–1	2–1	1–1	2–1	3–7	1–2	1–0	0–0	1–1	0–0	0–1	4–2	0–2
Aldershot	1–2		1–1	2–1	1–1	3–0	1–0	0–1	2–1	2–1	0–0	3–1	2–2	1–0	5–0	4–3	2–1	1–2	3–0	0–1	2–0	0–0	3–1	1–2
Blackburn Rovers	1–0	2–0		1–0	1–0	3–1	2–0	3–2	1–1	4–1	1–1	1–0	1–0	1–1	0–1	5–2	2–2	3–0	1–0	2–0	2–1	3–3	0–0	0–0
Brighton & Hove Albion	2–1	2–0	0–1		0–0	1–1	2–1	2–0	1–0	4–3	3–1	0–0	2–1	2–0	2–0	2–2	1–1	0–4	2–0	1–1	3–1	1–0	2–0	3–3
Bury	1–0	2–1	1–2	2–1		2–1	1–1	0–0	2–2	0–1	1–1	4–1	3–0	3–0	3–0	0–1	3–1	2–0	0–1	0–0	3–1	2–0	1–0	2–2
Charlton Athletic	2–3	3–1	2–1	2–1	0–1		3–2	4–1	1–0	2–1	1–1	3–1	2–0	1–0	3–0	0–2	2–2	3–1	2–1	3–3	3–3	4–2	4–1	1–1
Chesterfield	0–0	0–2	1–2	2–4	2–0	2–0		1–1	2–1	2–1	2–0	1–1	4–1	3–0	2–0	1–2	1–0	0–0	1–1	0–2	1–0	2–2	4–4	3–1
Colchester United	1–0	0–0	2–0	2–2	3–2	3–0	1–2		1–1	4–2	5–0	2–0	1–2	3–2	4–1	1–0	2–0	2–2	1–1	2–0	2–1	1–2	1–1	1–1
Crystal Palace	4–1	3–0	1–0	3–0	2–2	2–1	1–4	2–1		4–0	3–0	1–1	2–2	1–1	1–1	3–3	1–1	1–0	1–1	6–2	2–1	1–0	1–0	2–0
Gillingham	1–0	0–0	1–1	2–1	1–0	0–1	4–0	2–1	3–1		2–0	4–0	2–3	3–2	1–1	2–2	0–0	2–1	2–1	3–1	2–3	2–2	2–1	2–1
Grimsby Town	0–0	2–0	1–2	3–2	2–0	1–1	2–0	1–1	2–1	2–1		2–1	0–0	1–2	1–2	1–1	3–0	2–1	0–0	2–0	3–2	0–0	2–2	2–0
Halifax Town	3–2	1–0	1–1	1–0	0–1	2–2	1–3	1–1	3–1	1–1	1–1		2–2	2–1	2–1	1–1	1–1	3–0	3–1	0–0	0–0	1–0	2–0	1–0
Hereford United	0–1	2–0	6–3	2–0	1–1	2–2	5–0	3–1	2–0	1–1	3–2	0–0		1–1	2–0	1–5	1–0	2–2	1–0	2–1	2–0	2–0	0–1	1–0
Huddersfield Town	2–2	2–2	1–2	1–0	0–0	1–3	2–0	3–2	0–1	0–2	1–0	1–2	2–1		1–2	0–2	3–1	0–1	4–1	2–2	0–0	3–2	3–1	0–0
Peterborough United	3–0	1–1	1–0	2–0	3–1	1–1	0–2	1–0	1–1	0–0	1–3	1–1	1–1	2–1		1–0	0–2	0–0	1–0	0–0	1–2	0–0	1–0	2–1
Plymouth Argyle	1–0	1–0	2–1	2–2	2–1	1–1	3–0	1–0	0–1	1–1	2–1	2–0	1–0	2–0	2–0		1–1	2–1	1–0	4–3	4–1	2–1	1–1	0–3
Port Vale	0–0	3–1	1–4	1–0	1–0	1–0	3–2	2–2	2–1	2–1	1–0	2–1	3–0	4–0	1–3	2–0		2–1	0–0	2–2	1–0	1–1	0–0	2–0
Preston North End	5–2	3–1	0–0	1–0	3–0	2–0	2–1	0–2	1–1	1–0	2–0	1–0	2–2	4–0	1–1	1–0	1–0		1–4	2–0	1–0	3–2	2–2	3–1
Southend United	0–0	1–1	2–2	1–0	1–0	2–1	2–1	1–1	0–1	2–2	3–0	4–0	0–0	1–0	1–2	2–1	1–3	1–1		2–0	1–0	3–0	0–0	1–1
Swindon Town	2–1	3–2	2–0	1–0	0–2	2–0	1–0	4–1	1–1	1–0	3–2	3–1	1–0	4–1	0–1	2–0	3–2	1–0	2–0		0–0	3–0	2–2	2–1
Tranmere Rovers	0–1	2–0	1–1	1–2	0–0	0–1	1–2	2–0	2–0	1–1	3–1	3–1	6–1	1–2	1–0	1–3	1–0	3–1	2–1	3–0		3–0	2–2	0–1
Walsall	2–0	3–0	1–3	6–0	3–0	0–1	2–2	5–2	3–0	1–1	2–0	1–1	3–1	2–0	0–1	0–0	0–0	2–0	3–0	2–0	1–0		2–0	2–1
Watford	1–0	1–1	0–0	1–1	2–1	0–2	2–2	1–2	1–2	0–0	3–2	2–2	1–1	1–0	0–3	1–3	3–2	3–2	2–0	1–0	1–0	2–3		1–2
Wrexham	1–1	4–0	1–1	2–1	3–1	0–3	0–0	2–1	0–0	0–1	2–3	4–0	2–1	3–0	1–2	5–1	2–2	1–1	1–1	1–2	1–0	0–0	5–1	

Updated to match(es) played on unknown. Source: Ian Laschke: Rothmans Book of Football League Records 1888–89 to 1978–79. Macdonald and Jane’s, London & Sydney, 1980.
Legend: Blue = home team win; Yellow = draw; Red = away team win.

=== Maps ===
Locations of the Football League Third Division London teams 1974–1975
Locations of the Football League Third Division teams 1974–1975

== Fourth Division ==
Fourth Division
- Season: 1974–75
- Champions: Mansfield Town (1st title)
- Promoted: Chester; Rotherham United; Shrewsbury Town
- Failed re-election: None
- Matches: 552
- Goals: 1,407 (2.55 per match)
- Top goalscorer: Ray Clarke (Mansfield Town) (28 goals)

Pos	Team	Pld	W	D	L	GF	GA	GAv	Pts	Promotion or relegation
1	Mansfield Town (C, P)	46	28	12	6	90	40	2.250	68	Promotion to the Third Division
2	Shrewsbury Town (P)	46	26	10	10	80	43	1.860	62	Promotion to the Third Division
3	Rotherham United (P)	46	22	15	9	71	41	1.732	59	Promotion to the Third Division
4	Chester (P)	46	23	11	12	64	38	1.684	57	Promotion to the Third Division
5	Lincoln City	46	21	15	10	79	48	1.646	57	
6	Cambridge United	46	20	14	12	62	44	1.409	54	
7	Reading	46	21	10	15	63	47	1.340	52	
8	Brentford	46	18	13	15	53	45	1.178	49	
9	Exeter City	46	19	11	16	60	63	0.952	49	
10	Bradford City	46	17	13	16	56	51	1.098	47	
11	Southport	46	15	17	14	56	56	1.000	47	
12	Newport County	46	19	9	18	68	75	0.907	47	
13	Hartlepool	46	16	11	19	52	62	0.839	43	
14	Torquay United	46	14	14	18	46	61	0.754	42	
15	Barnsley	46	15	11	20	62	65	0.954	41	
16	Northampton Town	46	15	11	20	67	73	0.918	41	
17	Doncaster Rovers	46	14	12	20	65	79	0.823	40	
18	Crewe Alexandra	46	11	18	17	34	47	0.723	40	
19	Rochdale	46	13	13	20	59	75	0.787	39	
20	Stockport County	46	12	14	20	43	70	0.614	38	
21	Darlington	46	13	10	23	54	67	0.806	36	Re-elected
22	Swansea City	46	15	6	25	46	73	0.630	36	Re-elected
23	Workington	46	10	11	25	36	66	0.545	31	Re-elected
24	Scunthorpe United	46	7	15	24	41	78	0.526	29	Re-elected

Source: rsssf.com
(C) Champions; (P) Promoted

=== Results ===
Home \ Away	BAR	BRA	BRE	CAM	CHE	CRE	DAR	DON	EXE	HAR	LIN	MAN	NPC	NOR	REA	ROC	ROT	SCU	SHR	SOU	STP	SWA	TOR	WRK
Barnsley		2–2	1–1	1–1	0–1	1–1	1–1	0–1	1–0	2–1	0–2	1–3	2–1	5–1	2–0	5–3	1–1	2–2	1–0	3–0	2–0	1–0	0–1	0–1
Bradford City	2–0		1–0	1–1	2–0	1–2	1–1	2–0	0–1	3–0	1–2	1–1	0–1	2–1	1–3	1–0	1–1	3–0	1–2	1–2	2–0	1–2	3–0	1–1
Brentford	3–0	0–0		1–0	1–1	1–0	3–0	1–1	2–0	1–0	1–1	2–3	0–0	1–0	1–0	3–0	3–4	2–0	2–1	1–0	3–0	1–0	3–1	2–2
Cambridge United	2–0	0–1	2–0		3–0	2–0	1–0	4–1	1–1	3–2	5–0	2–2	1–1	3–4	1–0	1–1	0–0	2–0	0–2	1–0	1–0	2–0	3–1	3–0
Chester	2–1	1–0	2–0	1–1		2–0	1–0	3–0	1–1	3–0	4–1	0–0	4–1	4–1	2–0	4–0	0–1	1–0	1–1	3–0	3–1	3–0	3–0	0–0
Crewe Alexandra	1–1	0–0	1–1	0–0	0–1		2–1	2–1	2–1	2–0	1–0	0–2	1–2	3–1	1–0	0–1	1–0	1–1	0–0	0–0	2–0	2–2	0–1	0–0
Darlington	0–0	0–3	2–1	6–0	1–1	1–0		4–1	2–0	1–2	1–4	2–1	3–0	2–0	0–1	1–2	0–1	3–1	1–2	1–1	0–2	3–2	2–2	2–0
Doncaster Rovers	1–1	4–1	2–1	0–1	1–1	2–1	1–3		3–3	3–0	2–2	4–3	0–2	2–0	1–1	4–1	0–0	1–1	1–3	1–1	2–1	3–2	3–0	0–0
Exeter City	4–2	1–0	1–0	1–4	1–0	2–0	4–1	2–1		1–0	1–2	0–1	3–1	2–2	0–2	2–1	0–4	0–0	1–0	1–0	4–1	1–2	0–0	1–0
Hartlepool	4–3	1–2	3–2	1–1	1–0	1–1	2–0	2–1	0–3		2–0	2–1	2–0	2–0	2–3	5–0	3–2	1–0	1–1	1–1	1–1	0–2	0–0	3–0
Lincoln City	3–0	2–1	1–1	0–0	2–1	0–0	1–1	4–0	5–0	2–0		0–0	5–2	2–2	1–1	3–0	2–0	1–0	3–0	1–1	2–0	1–3	3–1	3–0
Mansfield Town	2–1	3–0	1–1	2–1	0–0	0–0	4–2	5–2	3–2	2–0	3–1		3–0	3–0	1–1	2–0	1–1	7–0	3–1	2–1	1–1	3–0	3–0	1–0
Newport County	3–4	2–1	1–0	1–2	3–0	1–1	2–1	0–2	1–2	2–0	1–1	2–1		2–1	2–2	3–2	1–1	2–0	2–4	1–0	3–3	3–0	2–1	3–1
Northampton Town	2–1	1–2	0–0	1–2	2–0	3–0	3–0	2–0	1–1	3–0	1–0	0–2	3–2		0–3	0–1	1–1	3–0	3–3	1–1	4–1	5–1	1–1	3–0
Reading	0–3	1–1	1–0	2–0	2–1	1–1	3–0	2–0	3–0	0–0	1–0	1–1	3–0	3–2		2–1	1–1	1–1	1–2	4–1	1–3	1–2	1–0	3–0
Rochdale	3–1	1–1	0–0	0–0	0–1	3–0	2–0	2–0	1–1	3–0	1–1	0–1	2–4	2–2	0–2		1–2	4–2	0–0	3–3	3–0	1–0	1–1	2–0
Rotherham United	2–0	4–0	3–0	0–0	1–2	1–1	1–1	1–0	1–1	1–2	2–2	2–1	1–1	1–3	2–1	3–1		3–2	0–0	3–0	3–0	1–0	3–1	1–0
Scunthorpe United	1–0	1–2	1–2	2–0	1–3	1–1	1–1	0–0	2–1	1–1	1–1	0–1	4–1	2–1	0–1	2–2	0–3		1–0	3–3	0–0	1–2	0–2	2–1
Shrewsbury Town	3–1	3–2	1–0	1–0	2–0	0–1	2–0	7–4	2–2	0–1	0–4	0–1	1–0	6–0	2–0	1–1	3–1	5–0		1–0	0–0	2–0	2–0	2–0
Southport	1–0	1–2	3–0	2–2	2–1	1–1	1–0	2–1	3–0	0–0	3–2	1–1	1–3	0–0	2–0	1–0	2–0	1–0	1–2		2–1	3–0	1–1	2–2
Stockport County	0–3	1–1	1–1	1–0	1–1	1–0	2–1	0–2	3–2	1–1	0–0	3–2	1–1	1–0	1–0	2–3	1–0	3–2	0–3	0–0		2–1	0–0	1–3
Swansea City	0–3	1–1	0–1	2–1	0–1	2–1	1–0	3–3	0–2	1–0	2–1	1–2	2–0	1–0	1–2	3–3	0–2	1–0	1–4	2–2	1–0		0–1	0–1
Torquay United	1–1	0–1	3–2	1–0	3–0	1–0	0–0	2–0	2–2	2–1	1–3	0–2	0–1	0–1	2–1	3–0	0–3	1–1	1–1	3–2	2–2	0–0		2–1
Workington	1–2	0–0	0–1	1–2	0–0	3–0	1–2	0–3	0–1	1–1	0–2	1–3	3–1	2–2	2–1	2–1	0–2	1–1	0–2	0–1	1–0	2–0	2–1	

Updated to match(es) played on unknown. Source: Ian Laschke: Rothmans Book of Football League Records 1888–89 to 1978–79. Macdonald and Jane’s, London & Sydney, 1980.
Legend: Blue = home team win; Yellow = draw; Red = away team win.

=== Maps ===
Locations of the Football League Fourth Division London teams 1974–1975
Locations of the Football League Fourth Division teams 1974–1975

== Attendances ==
=== Division One ===
No.	Club	Average	Highest	Lowest
1	Liverpool FC	45,966	55,853	35,151
2	Everton FC	40,021	57,190	31,882
3	Leeds United FC	34,822	50,084	25,832
4	Newcastle United FC	34,614	43,526	21,895
5	Manchester City FC	32,898	45,194	24,047
6	Birmingham City FC	30,854	36,513	24,240
7	West Ham United FC	29,872	40,256	20,977
8	Middlesbrough FC	28,605	39,500	21,478
9	Arsenal FC	28,315	43,762	16,540
10	Chelsea FC	27,396	39,461	11,048
11	Stoke City FC	27,339	46,023	20,526
12	Derby County FC	26,719	36,882	21,197
13	Tottenham Hotspur FC	26,458	50,998	12,813
14	Ipswich Town FC	24,924	31,642	20,193
15	Leicester City FC	23,765	38,143	16,636
16	Wolverhampton Wanderers FC	23,405	34,875	15,187
17	Sheffield United FC	22,555	38,442	14,694
18	Queens Park Rangers FC	20,394	28,357	13,244
19	Burnley FC	19,641	32,111	14,644
20	Coventry City FC	19,100	25,460	15,217
21	Luton Town FC	17,396	23,096	10,464
22	Carlisle United FC	14,530	20,844	8,339

=== Division Two ===
No.	Club	Average	Highest	Lowest
1	Manchester United	48,389	60,585	40,671
2	Sunderland AFC	29,931	45,976	24,000
3	Aston Villa FC	27,653	57,266	15,840
4	Norwich City FC	22,460	35,943	16,981
5	Southampton FC	15,910	21,866	11,491
6	Bristol City FC	14,061	28,953	9,300
7	Bolton Wanderers FC	13,800	38,152	8,199
8	Sheffield Wednesday FC	13,453	35,230	7,585
9	Nottingham Forest FC	13,000	25,013	7,957
10	Oldham Athletic FC	12,492	26,356	9,240
11	Portsmouth FC	12,474	25,608	7,412
12	West Bromwich Albion FC	12,424	29,614	7,812
13	Bristol Rovers FC	12,222	20,911	8,667
14	Notts County FC	10,927	20,303	7,227
15	Fulham FC	10,809	26,513	5,739
16	Blackpool FC	10,112	25,370	4,922
17	Cardiff City FC	9,143	22,344	5,648
18	York City FC	8,954	15,314	6,321
19	Millwall FC	8,583	17,540	4,963
20	Hull City AFC	8,573	23,287	5,203
21	Oxford United FC	8,261	15,959	5,772
22	Leyton Orient FC	7,605	17,772	4,352

=== Division Three ===
No.	Club	Average	Highest	Lowest
1	Crystal Palace FC	17,274	24,271	12,835
2	Plymouth Argyle FC	14,060	28,744	5,175
3	Blackburn Rovers FC	12,651	24,007	5,858
4	Brighton & Hove Albion FC	11,751	26,123	8,172
5	Charlton Athletic FC	10,444	26,104	4,527
6	Preston North End FC	9,568	18,042	5,819
7	Peterborough United FC	8,446	13,172	4,580
8	Swindon Town FC	8,280	12,094	5,130
9	Gillingham FC	7,331	14,565	4,824
10	Hereford United FC	7,230	11,488	4,807
11	Southend United FC	6,655	17,648	4,466
12	Watford FC	6,460	11,635	3,941
13	Walsall FC	6,268	10,251	2,927
14	AFC Bournemouth	5,988	10,307	4,116
15	Grimsby Town FC	5,962	9,250	4,501
16	Bury FC	5,527	11,963	3,428
17	Huddersfield Town AFC	5,428	8,122	2,455
18	Colchester United FC	4,937	7,790	3,202
19	Chesterfield FC	4,615	8,692	3,257
20	Aldershot Town FC	4,385	8,790	2,464
21	Wrexham AFC	4,376	8,226	2,463
22	Port Vale FC	4,346	9,135	2,704
23	Tranmere Rovers	2,803	6,534	1,264
24	Halifax Town AFC	2,681	8,689	1,241

=== Division Four ===
No.	Club	Average	Highest	Lowest
1	Mansfield Town FC	7,204	14,392	3,109
2	Lincoln City FC	5,795	13,108	2,461
3	Rotherham United FC	5,488	11,669	2,738
4	Reading FC	5,386	9,787	3,855
5	Brentford FC	5,172	6,485	3,983
6	Chester City FC	4,745	8,583	2,625
7	Barnsley FC	4,646	7,810	2,666
8	Northampton Town FC	4,179	7,275	2,482
9	Shrewsbury Town FC	4,125	8,913	2,880
10	Exeter City FC	3,435	7,271	2,271
11	Bradford City AFC	3,191	4,970	1,697
12	Cambridge United FC	3,021	4,159	1,858
13	Doncaster Rovers FC	2,975	7,278	1,286
14	Torquay United FC	2,868	5,570	1,822
15	Newport County AFC	2,674	4,165	1,535
16	Crewe Alexandra FC	2,649	5,118	1,506
17	Hartlepool United FC	2,634	5,178	1,627
18	Scunthorpe United FC	2,239	6,044	1,440
19	Darlington FC	2,233	3,974	1,582
20	Stockport County FC	2,099	2,721	1,500
21	Swansea City AFC	2,070	3,501	1,428
22	Southport FC	1,737	2,657	924
23	Rochdale AFC	1,507	2,317	1,033
24	Workington AFC	1,481	2,113	1,102

== See also ==
- 1974–75 in English football
