= List of Blackburn Rovers F.C. players =

Blackburn Rovers Football Club was founded in 1875, first entered the FA Cup four years later, and became a founder member of the Football League in 1888 and of the Premier League in 1992. The club's first team have been English champions three times, and have won six FA Cups, one Football League Cup and one Full Members' Cup. All players who have made 100 or more appearances in nationally or internationally organised competitive matches for the club should be listed below.

Each player's details include the duration of his Rovers career, his typical playing position while with the club, and the number of games played and goals scored in domestic league matches and in all senior competitive matches. Where applicable, the list also includes the national team(s) for which the player was selected.

== Key ==
- Players are listed in chronological order according to the year in which they first played for the club, and then by alphabetical order of their surname.
- Appearances as a substitute are included.
- Statistics are correct up to and including the end of the 2023–24 Blackburn Rovers F.C. season.

Positions key
GK	Goalkeeper
DF	Defender
FB	Full back
CD	Central defender
MF	Midfielder
CH	Centre half
WH	Wing half
W	Winger
FW	Forward
IF	Inside forward
CF	Centre forward
U	Utility player

Player
Players marked * were registered for the club as at the date specified above.
Players marked ‡ have won the Blackburn Rovers F.C. Player of the Year award.
Position
Playing positions are listed according to the tactical formations that were employed at the time. Thus the change in the names of defensive and midfield positions reflects the tactical evolution that occurred from the 1960s onwards.
Club career
Club career is defined as the first and last calendar years in which the player appeared for the club in any of the competitions listed below.
League appearances and League goals
League appearances and goals comprise those in the Football League and the Premier League. Appearances in the 1939–40 Football League season, abandoned after three games because of the Second World War, are excluded.
Total appearances and Total goals
Total appearances and goals comprise those in the Football League (including test matches and play-offs), Premier League, FA Cup, League Cup, European Cup, UEFA Cup, UEFA Intertoto Cup, EFL Trophy and predecessors, Anglo-Scottish Cup, Full Members' Cup, and FA Charity Shield. Matches in wartime competitions are excluded.
International selection
Countries are listed only for players who have been selected for international football. Only the highest level of international competition is given, except for players who competed for more than one country, for whom the highest level reached for each country is shown.

== Players with 100 or more appearances ==
Table of players, including playing position, club statistics and international selection
Player	Pos.	Club career	League		Total		International selection	Notes	Refs.
Player	Pos.	Club career	Apps	Goals	Apps	Goals	International selection	Notes	Refs.
Jimmy Forrest	WH	1883–1895	148	2	195	7	England		
Nat Walton	IF/GK	1884–1893	110	37	139	49	England		
Jack Southworth	CF	1887–1893	108	97	132	121	England		
Billy Townley	W	1887–1892; 1893–1894	97	37	123	51	England	(Note: Billy Townley played for Blackburn in two FA Cup finals; in the second, in 1891, he became the first man to score a hat-trick in an FA Cup final as Blackburn beat Sheffield Wednesday 6–1.)	
John Forbes	FB	1888–1894	106	1	127	2	—		
Tom Brandon	FB	1889–1891; 1893–1900	216	2	245	2	Scotland		
Harry Campbell	IF	1889–1894	98	22	113	26	Scotland		
Geordie Dewar	CH/WH	1889–1897	174	7	196	10	Scotland		
Harry Chippendale	W	1891–1897	134	50	147	52	England		
Geordie Anderson	CH	1892–1897; 1898–1900	178	19	200	20	—	(Note: New Brighton Tower)	
John Murray	FB	1892–1896	109	0	122	0	—		
Adam Ogilvie	GK	1893–1897	108	0	120	0	—		
Tom Booth	WH	1896–1900	111	10	123	11	England		
Kelly Houlker	WH	1896–1902; 1906–1909	151	2	163	2	England		
Bob Crompton	FB	1897–1920	529	14	576	14	England	(Note: Bob Crompton was manager of Blackburn from 1926 to 1931 and again from 1938 to 1941.)	
Fred Blackburn	W	1898–1905	192	25	206	31	England		
Bob Haworth	CH/WH	1898–1903	122	5	129	5	—		
Jack Dewhurst	CF	1899–1903	169	43	182	47	—		
Sammy McClure	CH	1899–1906	144	12	152	12	—		
Arnie Whittaker	W	1899–1908	250	57	265	57	—		
Willie McIver	GK	1901–1908	126	0	132	0	—		
Adam Bowman	FW	1903–1907	99	42	104	43	—		
Billy Bradshaw	WH	1903–1920	386	36	426	39	England		
Bob Evans	GK	1903–1908	104	0	113	0	Wales		
Sam Wolstenholme	WH	1904–1908	98	1	105	2	England		
Arthur Cowell	FB	1905–1919	278	0	305	0	England		
Bill Davies	CF	1905–1912	132	67	143	70	Wales		
Walter Aitkenhead	IF/HB	1906–1915	210	75	239	95	Scotland		
Eddie Latheron	IF	1906–1915	256	94	281	104	England		
Tommy Suttie	FB	1907–1915	103	0	110	0	—		
Albert Walmsley	WH	1907–1920	272	6	300	6	—		
Walter Anthony	W	1908–1914	149	11	164	14	—		
Jimmy Ashcroft	GK	1908–1913	114	0	129	0	England		
George Chapman	CH/CF	1908–1910; 1911–1915	138	34	152	42	—		
Percy Smith	CH	1910–1920	172	5	193	6	—		
Alfred Robinson	GK	1911–1920	144	0	157	0	—		
Jock Simpson	W	1911–1915	151	15	169	22	England		
Joe Hodkinson	W	1913–1923	228	19	244	20	England		
Danny Shea	IF	1913–1920	97	62	105	65	England		
Percy Dawson	CF	1914–1923	140	71	151	73	—		
Ernest Hawksworth	IF	1919–1924	96	34	100	34	—		
Harry Healless	WH/CH	1919–1932	360	12	397	13	England		
Peter Holland	FW	1919–1928	116	24	125	25	—		
Frank Reilly	CH	1919–1923	127	8	138	9	—		
Dave Rollo	FB	1919–1926	207	5	225	6	Ireland		
Ronnie Sewell	GK	1920–1927	227	0	248	0	England		
Jock McKay	IF	1921–1927	150	46	161	49	Scotland		
Jimmy McKinnell	WH	1921–1926	111	0	124	0	—		
Tom Wylie	FB	1921–1925	174	0	191	0	—		
Johnny McIntyre	IF/WH	1922–1927	175	38	194	38	—		
Austen Campbell	WH	1923–1929	161	7	184	9	England		
John Crisp	W	1923–1926	98	18	108	19	—		
Ted Harper	CF	1923–1927; 1933–1934	171	121	177	122	England		
Jack Roscamp	WH/FW	1923–1932	223	37	251	44	—		
Robert Roxburgh	FB	1924–1930	114	0	128	0	—		
Jock Crawford	GK	1925–1932	155	0	173	0	—		
Syd Puddefoot	IF	1925–1932	250	79	276	87	England		
Arthur Rigby	W	1925–1929	156	41	169	44	England		
Jock Hutton	FB	1926–1932	127	4	146	5	Scotland		
Herbert Jones	FB	1926–1933	247	0	261	0	England		
Tommy McLean	IF	1927–1935	247	44	275	49	—		
Willie Rankin	CH	1927–1932	144	4	162	4	—		
Jack Bruton	W	1929–1938	324	108	344	115	England	(Note: Jack Bruton was manager of Blackburn from 1947 to 1949.)	
Bill Imrie	WH	1929–1934	165	23	176	24	—		
Tom Turner	W	1929–1936	113	24	115	24	—		
Cliff Binns	GK	1930–1936	183	0	196	0	—		
Jesse Carver	CH	1930–1936	143	2	146	2	—		
Arthur Cunliffe	W	1930–1933	129	47	140	55	England		
Jimmy Gorman	FB	1931–1937	213	0	225	0	—		
Ernie Thompson	CF	1931–1936	171	82	179	84	—		
Walter Crook	FB	1932–1947	218	2	237	2	England wartime	(Note: Walter Crook set a club record for most consecutive League appearances, with 208 between 1934 and 1946.)	
Bob Pryde	CH	1933–1949	320	11	345	11	—		
Arnold Whiteside	WH	1933–1949	218	3	239	3	—		
Len Butt	IF	1937–1946	110	44	117	48	—		
Bobby Langton	W	1938–1948; 1953–1956	212	57	230	58	England		
Eric Bell	WH	1946–1956	323	9	333	9	—		
Jackie Campbell	U	1946–1955	224	19	245	20	—		
Jack Patterson	GK	1946–1956	107	0	112	0	—		
Les Graham	FW	1947–1952	150	42	157	44	—		
David Gray	FB	1947–1953	107	5	111	5	—		
Eddie Crossan	IF	1948–1957	287	73	302	74	Northern Ireland		
Bill Eckersley	FB	1948–1960	406	20	432	21	England		
Jackie Wharton	W	1948–1952	129	15	138	17	—		
Ron Suart	FB/CH	1949–1955	176	0	187	0	—		
Ronnie Clayton	WH	1951–1969	581	15	665	16	England		
Reg Elvy	GK	1951–1956	192	0	208	0	—		
Willie Kelly	CH	1951–1956	186	1	202	1	—		
Eddie Quigley	IF	1951–1956	159	92	166	95	—	(Note: Eddie Quigley was manager of Blackburn from 1967 to 1970.)	
Tommy Briggs	CF	1952–1957	194	140	204	143	England B		
Bill Smith	U	1952–1960	119	10	128	12	—		
Bryan Douglas	FW	1954–1969	438	101	503	115	England		
Ken Taylor	FB	1954–1969	200	0	233	0	—		
Roy Vernon	IF	1955–1960	131	49	144	52	Wales		
Peter Dobing	FW	1956–1961	179	88	205	104	England U23		
Harry Leyland	GK	1956–1961	166	0	188	0	—		
Ally MacLeod	W	1956–1961	193	47	218	53	Scottish Schools		
Mick McGrath	WH	1956–1965	268	8	312	12	Republic of Ireland		
Matt Woods	CH	1956–1963	260	2	307	3	—		
John Bray	FB	1959–1965	153	2	184	2	—		
Mike England	CH	1959–1966	165	21	184	21	Wales		
Andy McEvoy	IF/WH	1959–1967	183	89	213	103	Republic of Ireland		
Fred Pickering	CF	1959–1964; 1971	134	61	158	74	England		
Keith Newton	FB	1960–1969	306	9	357	10	England		
John Byrom	W	1961–1966	124	50	149	64	—		
Fred Else	GK	1961–1966	187	0	221	0	—		
Mike Ferguson	W	1962–1968	220	29	249	36	—		
Mike Harrison	W	1962–1967	160	40	181	43	—		
Walter Joyce	MF	1964–1967	120	4	135	4	—		
Dick Mulvaney	CD	1964–1971	141	4	151	4	—		
Malcolm Darling	FW	1965–1970	128	30	141	34	—		
Eamonn Rogers	MF	1965–1971	165	30	183	39	Republic of Ireland		
George Sharples	WH/CH	1965–1969	103	5	113	5	England U18		
Billy Wilson	FB	1965–1971	247	0	277	0	—		
John Connelly	W	1966–1970	149	36	164	39	England		
Adam Blacklaw	GK	1967–1970	96	0	110	0	—		
Don Martin	CF	1968–1975	224	57	255	63	—		
Stuart Metcalfe	MF	1968–1980; 1983	387	21	451	26	England U18		
Roger Jones	GK	1970–1976	242	0	277	0	England U23		
Tony Parkes	MF	1970–1981	350	38	409	46	—	(Note: Tony Parkes was caretaker manager of Blackburn on six separate occasions between 1986 and 2004.)	
Mick Wood	FB	1970–1978	148	2	170	4	—		
Preben Arentoft	MF/DF	1971–1974	94	3	108	3	—		
Derek Fazackerley ‡	CD	1971–1986	596	24	689	26	—	(Note: Derek Fazackerley holds the club record for most league appearances with 596.)	
Tony Field	FW	1971–1974	106	45	120	54	—		
Terry Garbett	MF	1971–1974	90	6	103	7	—		
Mick Heaton	FB	1971–1976	171	1	194	1	—		
John Waddington	CD/MF	1973–1979	148	18	175	20	—		
Ken Beamish	FW	1974–1976	86	18	104	28	—		
Graham Hawkins	CD	1974–1977	109	4	131	4	—		
Kevin Hird	MF/FB	1974–1979	132	20	160	21	—		
John Bailey	FB	1975–1979	120	1	144	1	England B		
Glenn Keeley	CH	1976–1987	370	23	431	24	England U18		
Noel Brotherston	W	1977–1987	317	40	381	54	Northern Ireland		
John Butcher	GK	1977–1980	104	0	122	0	—		
Simon Garner ‡	CF	1978–1992	484	168	570	194	—	(Note: Simon Garner holds the club goalscoring record, with 168 in league competition.)	
Jim Branagan	FB	1979–1987	294	5	338	5	—		
Mick Rathbone ‡	FB	1979–1987	273	2	310	2	—		
John Lowey	CF/MF	1980–1986	141	14	156	16	—		
Terry Gennoe ‡	GK	1981–1990	289	0	334	0	England U18		
David Hamilton	MF	1981–1986	114	7	123	7	—		
Ian Miller	W	1981–1989	268	16	305	18	—		
David Mail ‡	CD	1982–1990	206	4	248	4	—		
Simon Barker ‡	MF	1983–1988	182	35	208	41	England U21	(Note: Simon Barker's 1988 sale to Queens Park Rangers set a then club record for fee received of £400,000.)	
Mark Patterson	W	1983–1988	101	20	115	22	—		
Chris Thompson	CF	1983–1986	85	24	100	26	—		
Scott Sellars ‡	MF	1986–1992	202	35	245	41	England		
Howard Gayle ‡	FW	1987–1991	116	29	144	34	England U21		
Colin Hendry ‡	CD	1987–1989; 1991–1998	336	34	408	35	Scotland		
Keith Hill	CD	1987–1992	96	4	113	5	—		
John Millar	FB/MF	1987–1991	126	1	151	1	Scotland U18		
Bobby Mimms	GK	1987; 1991–1995	134	0	162	0	England	(Note: Everton)	
Nicky Reid	MF	1987–1992	174	9	209	10	England U21		
Chris Sulley	FB	1987–1991	134	3	156	3	—		
Mark Atkins	FB/MF	1988–1995	257	34	314	39	—		
David May	CD	1989–1994	123	2	151	5	—		
Kevin Moran ‡	CD	1990–1994	147	10	173	12	Republic of Ireland		
Jason Wilcox	W	1990–1999	269	31	312	34	England		
Mike Newell	FW	1991–1996	130	28	167	48	England B		
Stuart Ripley	W	1992–1998	187	13	228	16	England		
Alan Shearer ‡	FW	1992–1996	138	112	171	130	England		
Tim Sherwood	MF	1992–1999	246	25	300	31	England	(Note: Norwich City)	
Henning Berg	DF	1993–1997; 2000–2003	250	7	296	7	Norway	(Note: Manchester United) (Note: Henning Berg of Norway holds the record for most senior international caps as a Blackburn player. He briefly managed the club in 2012.)	
Tim Flowers	GK	1993–1999	177	0	217	0	England		
Kevin Gallacher	FW	1993–1999	144	46	169	53	Scotland		
Graeme Le Saux	FB	1993–1997	129	7	154	7	England		
Chris Sutton ‡	FW	1994–1999	130	47	161	59	England		
Jeff Kenna	FB	1995–2001	155	1	194	1	Republic of Ireland		
Billy McKinlay	MF	1995–1999	90	3	103	4	Scotland		
Garry Flitcroft	MF	1996–2005	246	14	280	20	England U21		
Damien Duff ‡	W	1997–2003	184	27	223	35	Republic of Ireland		
David Dunn	MF	1998–2003; 2007–2015	316	50	378	59	England		
Keith Gillespie	W	1998–2003	113	5	137	6	Northern Ireland		
Martin Taylor	CD	1998–2004	88	5	125	6	England U21		
Matt Jansen ‡	FW	1999–2005	153	44	182	57	England U21		
Craig Short	DF	1999–2005	134	4	146	5	—		
Brad Friedel ‡	GK	2000–2008	288	1	357	1	United States		
Nils-Eric Johansson	DF	2001–2005	86	0	110	2	Sweden		
Tugay Kerimoğlu ‡	MF	2001–2009	233	10	294	12	Turkey		
Lucas Neill	DF/MF	2001–2007	188	5	227	8	Australia		
Andy Cole	FW	2002–2004	83	27	100	37	England	(Note: Blackburn's record fee paid for a player, of £8,000,000, is shared by Andy Cole, who signed from Manchester United in 2001, and Jordan Rhodes, who joined from Huddersfield Town in 2012.)	
Andy Todd ‡	DF	2002–2007	88	4	113	5	—		
Brett Emerton	W	2003–2011	247	13	294	19	Australia		
Steven Reid	MF	2003–2010	113	6	134	8	Republic of Ireland; England U16		
Morten Gamst Pedersen	MF	2004–2013	288	35	349	47	Norway		
David Bentley ‡	MF	2005–2008; 2013	107	13	140	21	England		(Note: Tottenham Hotspur)
Aaron Mokoena	DF	2005–2009	101	0	139	2	South Africa		
Ryan Nelsen	DF	2005–2011	172	8	208	8	New Zealand		
Robbie Savage	MF	2005–2007	76	1	100	3	Wales		
Benni McCarthy	FW	2006–2010	109	37	140	52	South Africa		
Jason Roberts	FW	2006–2011	134	24	156	28	Grenada		
Martin Olsson	DF/MF	2007–2013	117	3	142	5	Sweden		
Christopher Samba	CD	2007–2011	161	16	185	18	Congo		
Stephen Warnock ‡	DF/MF	2007–2009	88	5	109	6	England		
Paul Robinson ‡	GK	2008–2014	189	0	201	0	England		
Gaël Givet	DF	2009; 2009–2013	115	3	132	5	France		(Note: Olympique Marseille)
Grant Hanley ‡	DF	2009–2016	183	7	200	8	Scotland		
Scott Dann	DF	2011–2014	98	5	106	7	England U21		
Jason Lowe	MF	2011–2017	173	1	196	1	England U21		
Marcus Olsson ‡	DF	2012–2016	104	1	114	1	Sweden		
Jordan Rhodes ‡	FW	2012–2016	159	83	169	85	Scotland		
Corry Evans	MF	2013–2021	206	4	219	5	Northern Ireland		
Ben Marshall	MF	2013–2017	126	11	140	15	England U21		
Craig Conway	MF	2014–2019	178	19	200	22	Scotland		
Jason Steele	GK	2014–2017	113	0	120	0	Great Britain squad; England U21		
Darragh Lenihan	DF	2015–2022	233	9	252	10	Republic of Ireland		
Ryan Nyambe	DF	2015–2022	183	0	201	0	Namibia		
David Raya	GK	2015–2019	98	0	108	0	Spain		
Sam Gallagher *	FW	2016–2017; 2019–2024	222	45	237	47	England U20; Scotland U19	(Note: Southampton)	
Elliott Bennett	MF	2016–2021	177	8	192	9	—		
Danny Graham ‡	FW	2016; 2016–2020	176	52	191	57	England U20	(Note: Sunderland)	
Charlie Mulgrew	DF	2016–2019	100	27	109	27	Scotland		
Derrick Williams ‡	DF	2016–2020	138	6	152	6	Republic of Ireland		
Bradley Dack ‡	MF	2017–2023	158	50	173	57	—		
Lewis Travis *	DF	2017–2025	239	8	254	8	—		
Adam Armstrong ‡	FW	2018–2021	151	58	160	64	England U21	(Note: Newcastle United)	
Ben Brereton Díaz	FW	2018–2023	160	45	177	47	Chile; England U20	(Note: Nottingham Forest)	
Joe Rothwell	MF	2018–2022	149	10	161	11	England U20		
John Buckley *	MF	2019–2025	148	6	170	9	—		
Tyrhys Dolan *	FW	2020–2025	192	23	211	26	England U20		
Thomas Kaminski ‡	GK	2020–2023	115	0	118	0	Belgium		
Harry Pickering *	DF	2021–present	124	4	139	4	—		
Scott Wharton *	DF	2016–present	92	5	108	9	—		
Joe Rankin-Costello *	MF	2017–2025	115	6	131	8	—		

== Notes ==
Player statistics include games played while on loan from clubs listed below. Unless individually sourced, loaning clubs come from the appearances source.

== Sources ==
- Jackman, Mike (1994). Blackburn Rovers The Official Encyclopedia. Derby: Breedon Books. ISBN 978-1-873626-70-2.
- Hugman, Barry J., ed. (2005). The PFA Footballers' Who's Who 2005–2006. Edinburgh: Mainstream. ISBN 978-1-85291-662-6.
- Hugman, Barry J., ed. (2007). The PFA Footballers' Who's Who 2007–08. Edinburgh: Mainstream. ISBN 978-1-84596-246-3.
