= 1940 Football League War Cup final =

- Event: 1940 Football League War Cup
West Ham United	Blackburn Rovers
1	0
- Date: 8 June 1940
- Venue: Wembley Stadium, London
- Attendance: 42,300

The 1940 Football League War Cup final was contested by West Ham United and Blackburn Rovers.

== Route to the final ==
En route to the final West Ham played Chelsea, Leicester City, Huddersfield Town and Birmingham City before a semi-final with Fulham which they won 4-3.

== Match ==
It was played on 8 June 1940 and kicked off at 6.30pm despite fears that London would be bombed by the Luftwaffe. The wartime crowd included wounded members of the BEF recently evacuated from Dunkirk. West Ham won the tie 1–0; the only goal coming from Sam Small in the 34th minute when he followed up a parried shot from George Foreman.

== Match details ==
8 June 1940

West Ham United	1–0	Blackburn Rovers
Small 34'

Wembley, London
Attendance: 42,300

West Ham United
Blackburn Rovers

1	(England) Herman Conway
2	(England) Charlie Bicknell
3	(England) Charlie Walker
4	(England) Ted Fenton
5	(England) Dick Walker
6	(England) Joe Cockroft
7	(England) Sam Small
8	(Scotland) Archie Macaulay
9	(England) George Foreman
10	(England) Len Goulden
11	(England) Stan Foxall
Manager:
(England) Charlie Paynter

1	(England) James Barron
2	(Wales) Billy Hough
3	(England) Walter Crook
4	(England) Arnold Whiteside
5	(Scotland) Bob Pryde
6	(England) Frank Chivers
7	(England) William Rodgers
8	(England) Len Butt
9	(England) John Weddle
10	(England) Albert Clarke
11	(England) Billy Guest
Manager:
(England) Bob Crompton

== Post match ==
The trophy was presented to the winning team by A. V. Alexander, First Lord of the Admiralty.

As the match was played during wartime, no reception was held for the winning team. Some players went to the Boleyn public house on Green Street for a few pints whilst others returned immediately to their service units.
