= 1957–58 Northampton Town F.C. season =

Northampton Town
1957–58 season
- Chairman: Walter Penn
- Manager: Dave Smith
- Stadium: County Ground
- Division Three (S): 13th
- FA Cup: Fourth round
- Top goalscorer: League: Barry Hawkings; Alan Woan (20); All: Barry Hawkings (22)
- Highest home attendance: 21,344 vs Arsenal
- Lowest home attendance: 2,412 vs Gillingham
- Average home league attendance: 8,127

The 1957–58 season was Northampton Town's 61st season in their history and the thirtieth consecutive season in the regionalised third tier of English football, the Third Division South, before a revamping of the league pyramid. The following season, teams in the top half of the division would be placed in the national Football League Third Division, while the teams placed in the bottom half would be find themselves effectively relegated to the newly constructed Football League Fourth Division. Alongside competing in Division Three South, the club also participated in the FA Cup.

== Players ==
As of match played 2 May 1958.

Name	Position	Nat.	Place of Birth	Date of Birth (Age)	Apps	Goals	Previous club	Date signed	Fee
Goalkeepers
Reg Elvy	GK	(England)	Leeds	25 November 1920 (aged 37)	55	0	Blackburn Rovers	Summer 1956	£350
Peter Pickering	GK	(England)	New Earswick	24 March 1926 (aged 32)	91	0	Kettering Town	Summer 1955	
Full backs
Tony Claypole	RB	(England)	Weldon	13 February 1937 (aged 21)	11	0	Apprentice	August 1956	N/A
Geoff Coleman	RB	(England)	Bedworth	13 May 1936 (aged 21)	17	0	Bedworth Town	Summer 1955	
Bobby Corbett	LB	(England)	Throckley	16 March 1922 (aged 36)	8	1	Middlesbrough	August 1957	
Ron Patterson (c)	LB	(England)	Gateshead	30 October 1929 (aged 28)	227	5	Middlesbrough	Summer 1952	
Half backs
Ben Collins	CH	(England)	Kislingbury	9 March 1928 (aged 30)	213	0	Apprentice	Summer 1948	N/A
Colin Gale	CH	(Wales)	Pontypridd	31 August 1932 (aged 25)	106	1	Cardiff City	March 1956	£1,500
Roly Mills	WH	(England)	Daventry	22 June 1933 (aged 24)	105	15	Apprentice	May 1951	N/A
Terry Robinson	CH	(England)	Woodham	8 November 1929 (aged 28)	14	0	Brentford	July 1957	
John Smith	WH	(England)	Leicester	4 September 1928 (aged 29)	161	9	Apprentice	May 1949	N/A
Bobby Peacock	WH	(England)	Rushden	8 December 1937 (aged 20)	2	0	Rushden Town	February 1957	
Inside/Outside forwards
Jack English	OF	(England)	South Shields	19 March 1923 (aged 35)	302	136	Apprentice	Summer 1947	N/A
Tommy Fowler	OF	(England)	Prescot	16 December 1924 (aged 33)	439	65	Everton	March 1945	
Roger Miller	OF	(England)	Northampton	18 August 1938 (aged 19)	2	1	Apprentice	Summer 1956	N/A
Maurice Robinson	OF	(England)	Newark-on-Trent	9 November 1929 (aged 28)	12	3	Kettering Town	June 1957	
Ken Leek	IF	(Wales)	Ynysybwl	26 July 1935 (aged 22)	76	29	Apprentice	Summer 1952	N/A
Joe O'Neil	IF	(Scotland)	Glasgow	15 August 1931 (aged 26)	6	3	Leicester City	October 1957	N/A
Bobby Tebbutt	IF	(England)	Irchester	10 November 1934 (aged 23)	30	13	Apprentice	October 1956	N/A
Alan Woan	IF	(England)	Liverpool	8 February 1931 (aged 27)	66	31	Norwich City	Summer 1956	
Centre forwards
Gerry Bright	CF	(England)	Northampton	2 December 1934 (aged 23)	4	0	Bromsgrove Rovers	April 1957	
Barry Hawkings	CF	(England)	Birmingham	7 November 1931 (aged 26)	47	22	Lincoln City	July 1957	£1,000

== Competitions ==
=== Division Three South ===
==== League table ====
Pos	Team	Pld	W	D	L	GF	GA	GAv	Pts	Promotion or relegation
11	Newport County	46	17	14	15	73	67	1.090	48	Qualification for the Third Division
12	Colchester United	46	17	13	16	77	79	0.975	47	Qualification for the Third Division
13	Northampton Town (R)	46	19	6	21	87	79	1.101	44	Relegation to the Fourth Division
14	Crystal Palace (R)	46	15	13	18	70	72	0.972	43	Relegation to the Fourth Division
15	Port Vale (R)	46	16	10	20	67	58	1.155	42	Relegation to the Fourth Division

(R) Relegated

==== Results summary ====
Overall								Home						Away					
Pld	W	D	L	GF	GA	GAv	Pts	W	D	L	GF	GA	Pts	W	D	L	GF	GA	Pts
46	19	6	21	87	79	1.101	44	13	1	9	60	33	27	6	5	12	27	46	17

Last updated: 30 January 2024.

==== League position by match ====
Round	1	2	3	4	5	6	7	8	9	10	11	12	13	14	15	16	17	18	19	20	21	22	23	24	25	26	27	28	29	30	31	32	33	34	35	36	37	38	39	40	41	42	43	44	45	46
Ground	A	H	H	A	A	A	H	H	A	H	A	A	H	A	H	A	H	A	H	H	A	A	H	H	A	H	A	H	H	A	A	H	A	H	A	H	H	A	A	H	H	A	A	H	H	A
Result	L	D	W	D	L	L	L	W	L	W	W	L	L	D	W	L	L	L	L	L	W	D	W	L	D	W	L	W	L	W	L	W	W	L	L	W	W	D	W	W	W	L	W	W	L	L
Position	15	17	9	10	14	17	22	19	23	19	16	17	22	19	15	18	20	20	20	21	21	18	18	19	19	18	19	18	19	17	18	17	18	18	18	17	17	17	17	16	15	15	13	13	13	13

Source: 11v11.com
A = Away; H = Home; W = Win; D = Draw; L = Loss

==== Matches ====
Win Draw Loss

24 August 1957 1	Walsall	2–1	Northampton Town	Walsall
15:00 BST			A.Woan	Stadium: Fellows Park; Attendance: 13,059; Referee: George McCabe

29 August 1957 2	Northampton Town	0–0	Aldershot	Northampton
BST				Stadium: County Ground; Attendance: 7,907

31 August 1957 3	Northampton Town	4–0	Coventry City	Northampton
BST	M.Robinson; A.Woan; R.Kirk o.g.'			Stadium: County Ground; Attendance: 12,037

4 September 1957 4	Aldershot	0–0	Northampton Town	Aldershot
BST				Stadium: Recreation Ground; Attendance: 4,188

7 September 1957 5	Shrewsbury Town	3–1	Northampton Town	Shrewsbury
15:15 BST			A.Woan	Stadium: Gay Meadow; Attendance: 9,542

10 September 1957 6	Brentford	7–1	Northampton Town	Brentford, London
BST	E.Parsons; J.Rainford; J.Towers; G.Francis		A.Woan	Stadium: Griffin Park; Attendance: 10,697

14 September 1957 7	Northampton Town	1–2	Reading	Northampton
BST	K.Leek			Stadium: County Ground; Attendance: 6,986

16 September 1957 8	Northampton Town	3–1	Brentford	Northampton
BST	J.English; K.Leek		G.Francis	Stadium: County Ground; Attendance: 4,528

21 September 1957 9	Swindon Town	5–1	Northampton Town	Swindon
15:00 BST			K.Leek	Stadium: County Ground; Attendance: 9,967

26 September 1957 10	Northampton Town	4–1	Colchester United	Northampton
BST	B.Corbett; B.Hawkings; K.Leek; R.Mills		K.Plant	Stadium: County Ground; Attendance: 3,454

28 September 1957 11	Watford	0–2	Northampton Town	Watford
15:00 BST			B.Hawkings; A.Woan	Stadium: Vicarage Road; Attendance: 11,579

30 September 1957 12	Colchester United	1–0	Northampton Town	Colchester
15:00 BST	P.Wright			Stadium: Layer Road; Attendance: 4,391

5 October 1957 13	Northampton Town	1–2	Crystal Palace	Northampton
BST	R.Patterson			Stadium: County Ground; Attendance: 7,594

9 October 1957 14	Norwich City	2–2	Northampton Town	Norwich
GMT			K.Leek	Stadium: Carrow Road; Attendance: 22,850

12 October 1957 15	Northampton Town	5–0	Plymouth Argyle	Northampton
GMT	B.Hawkings; K.Leek; J.O'Neil; A.Woan			Stadium: County Ground; Attendance: 9,692

19 October 1957 16	Port Vale	3–0	Northampton Town	Burslem
GMT	S.Steele; J.Wilkinson			Stadium: Vale Park; Attendance: 12,443; Referee: Les Hamer

26 October 1957 17	Northampton Town	0–3	Newport County	Northampton
GMT			N.O'Halloran; H.Harris; J.McSeveney	Stadium: County Ground; Attendance: 7,953

2 November 1957 18	Southampton	2–1	Northampton Town	Southampton
GMT	T.Mulgrew; J.McGowan		J.English	Stadium: The Dell; Attendance: 13,469

9 November 1957 19	Northampton Town	2–4	Brighton & Hove Albion	Northampton
GMT	B.Hawkings; K.Leek			Stadium: County Ground; Attendance: 7,088

23 November 1957 20	Northampton Town	1–5	Queens Park Rangers	Northampton
GMT	A.Woan			Stadium: County Ground; Attendance: 7,525

30 November 1957 21	Exeter City	0–1	Northampton Town	Exeter
15:00 GMT			K.Leek	Stadium: St James Park; Attendance: 7,933

14 December 1957 22	Millwall	0–0	Northampton Town	New Cross, London
GMT				Stadium: The Old Den; Attendance: 6,761

21 December 1957 23	Northampton Town	3–0	Walsall	Northampton
GMT	B.Hawkings; B.Tebbutt			Stadium: County Ground; Attendance: 7,058

26 December 1957 24	Northampton Town	0–1	Norwich City	Northampton
14:15 GMT			P.Gordon	Stadium: County Ground; Attendance: 11,125; Referee: Eric Jennings

28 December 1957 25	Coventry City	1–1	Northampton Town	Coventry
GMT			K.Leek	Stadium: Highfield Road; Attendance: 20,375

11 January 1958 26	Northampton Town	2–0	Shrewsbury Town	Northampton
GMT	B.Hawkings; K.Leek			Stadium: County Ground; Attendance: 8,391

18 January 1958 27	Reading	5–2	Northampton Town	Reading
GMT			B.Hawkings; B.Tebbutt	Stadium: Elm Park; Attendance: 10,846

1 February 1958 28	Northampton Town	3–0	Swindon Town	Northampton
GMT	T.Fowler; B.Hawkings; K.Leek			Stadium: County Ground; Attendance: 9,845

8 February 1958 29	Northampton Town	2–3	Watford	Northampton
GMT	K.Leek			Stadium: County Ground; Attendance: 8,400

15 February 1958 30	Crystal Palace	1–3	Northampton Town	Selhurst, London
GMT			B.Hawkings; B.Tebbutt	Stadium: Selhurst Park; Attendance: 16,245

22 February 1958 31	Plymouth Argyle	3–0	Northampton Town	Plymouth
15:15 GMT				Stadium: Home Park; Attendance: 16,667; Referee: Leo Callaghan

1 March 1958 32	Northampton Town	3–2	Port Vale	Northampton
GMT	B.Hawkings; J.O'Neil		S.Steele	Stadium: County Ground; Attendance: 8,711

8 March 1958 33	Newport County	0–1	Northampton Town	Newport, Wales
15:15 GMT			B.Hawkings	Stadium: Rodney Parade; Attendance: 7,011

15 March 1958 34	Northampton Town	1–3	Southampton	Northampton
GMT	R.Patterson		D.Roper; D.Reeves; J.Hoskins	Stadium: County Ground; Attendance: 9,374

22 March 1958 35	Queens Park Rangers	1–0	Northampton Town	White City, London
15:00 GMT				Stadium: Loftus Road; Attendance: 7,531

27 March 1958 36	Northampton Town	3–1	Gillingham	Northampton
16:45 GMT	J.English; T.Fowler; A.Woan		L.Riggs	Stadium: County Ground; Attendance: 2,412; Referee: Jack Sherlock

29 March 1958 37	Northampton Town	7–2	Millwall	Northampton
GMT	J.English; B.Hawkings; B.Tebbutt; A.Woan			Stadium: County Ground; Attendance: 6,393

4 April 1958 38	Bournemouth & Boscombe Athletic	1–1	Northampton Town	Bournemouth
15:00 GMT			R.Yeoman	Stadium: Dean Court; Attendance: 15,196

5 April 1958 39	Brighton & Hove Albion	1–4	Northampton Town	Hove
15:15 GMT			R.Mills; R.Patterson; A.Woan	Stadium: Goldstone Ground; Attendance: 20,066; Referee: Ken Aston

8 April 1958 40	Northampton Town	4–0	Bournemouth & Boscombe Athletic	Northampton
15:00 GMT	B.Hawkings; R.Patterson; B.Tebbutt; A.Woan			Stadium: County Ground; Attendance: 9,888; Referee: Peter Brandwood

12 April 1958 41	Northampton Town	9–0	Exeter City	Northampton
GMT	B.Hawkings; R.Mills; B.Tebbutt; A.Woan			Stadium: County Ground; Attendance: 9,465

16 April 1958 42	Torquay United	1–0	Northampton Town	Torquay
17:30 GMT				Stadium: Plainmoor; Attendance: 6,598

19 April 1958 43	Gillingham	1–2	Northampton Town	Gillingham
15:15 GMT			B.Hawkings; A.Woan	Stadium: Priestfield Stadium; Attendance: 5,721

24 April 1958 44	Northampton Town	1–0	Torquay United	Northampton
BST	A.Woan			Stadium: County Ground; Attendance: 10,123

26 April 1958 45	Northampton Town	1–3	Southend United	Northampton
BST	B.Hawkings			Stadium: County Ground; Attendance: 10,975

2 May 1958 46	Southend United	6–3	Northampton Town	Southend-on-Sea
18:30 GMT			B.Hawkings; B.Tebbutt; A.Woan	Stadium: Roots Hall; Attendance: 9,391

=== FA Cup ===
16 November 1957 First round	Northampton Town	3–0	Newport County	Northampton
GMT	C.Gale; R.Mills; M.Robinson			Stadium: County Ground

7 December 1957 Second round	Northampton Town	4–1	Bournemouth & Boscombe Athletic	Northampton
GMT	K.Leek; A.Woan; H.Hughes o.g.' O.Norris o.g.'			Stadium: County Ground

4 January 1958 Third round	Northampton Town	3–1	Arsenal	Northampton
14:15 GMT	B.Tebbutt 6'; B.Hawkings 60'; K.Leek		D.Clapton	Stadium: County Ground; Attendance: 21,344; Referee: Tom Cooper

25 January 1958 Fourth round	Liverpool	3–1	Northampton Town	Liverpool
14:45 GMT	B.Liddell 28'; B.Collins 79' (o.g.); L.Bimpson 82'	Report	B.Hawkings 42'	Stadium: Anfield Stadium; Attendance: 56,939; Referee: Leslie Tirebuck

=== Appearances and goals ===
Pos	Player	Division Three (S)		FA Cup		Total	
Pos	Player	Starts	Goals	Starts	Goals	Starts	Goals
GK	Reg Elvy	38	–	2	–	40	–
GK	Peter Pickering	8	–	2	–	10	–
FB	Tony Claypole	10	–	–	–	10	–
FB	Geoff Coleman	–	–	–	–	–	–
FB	Bobby Corbett	8	1	–	–	8	1
FB	Ron Patterson	40	4	4	–	44	4
HB	Ben Collins	24	–	4	–	28	–
HB	Colin Gale	46	–	4	1	50	1
HB	Roly Mills	37	4	4	1	41	5
HB	Terry Robinson	13	–	1	–	14	–
HB	John Smith	24	–	–	–	24	–
HB	Bobby Peacock	2	–	–	–	2	–
HB	Ray Yeoman	42	1	3	–	45	1
OF	Jack English	20	5	3	–	23	5
OF	Tommy Fowler	39	2	3	–	42	2
OF	Roger Miller	–	–	–	–	–	–
OF	Maurice Robinson	11	2	1	1	12	3
IF	Ken Leek	32	14	4	2	36	16
IF	Joe O'Neil	6	3	–	–	6	3
IF	Bobby Tebbutt	26	10	2	1	28	11
IF	Alan Woan	34	20	2	1	36	21
CF	Gerry Bright	3	–	–	–	3	–
CF	Barry Hawkings	43	20	4	2	47	22
