= Alfred Robinson =

Alfred Robinson may refer to:

- Alfred Robinson (businessman) (1806–1895), American businessman
- Alfred Robinson (footballer, born 1887) (1887–1945), English professional footballer for Grimsby Town
- Alfred Robinson (footballer, born 1888) (1888–?), English professional footballer for Gainsborough Trinity and Blackburn Rovers
- Alfred Robinson (footballer, born 1916) (1916–?), English professional footballer for York City
- Alfred D. Robinson (1866–1942), American horticulturalist
- Alfred Robinson (British Army officer) (1894–1978)
