= Wembley Wizards =

Nickname for Scottish football team of 1928

- Event: 1928 British Home Championship
| England | Scotland |
| (England) | (Scotland) |
| 1 | 5 |
- Date: 31 March 1928
- Venue: Wembley Stadium, London
- Referee: Willie Bell (Scotland)
- Attendance: 80,868

The Wembley Wizards is the nickname for the Scotland national football team that defeated England 5–1 at Wembley in the 1928 British Home Championship.

== Background ==
Scotland had failed to win either of their previous matches in the 1928 British Home Championship, losing 1–0 to Ireland at Hampden Park and drawing 2–2 with Wales in Wrexham. England had lost their first two games, 2–0 to Ireland in Belfast and 2–1 in Burnley to the eventual champions Wales. England's recent record against Scotland was poor, having only won once against Scotland in the 1920s. That solitary win had come in the previous match between the teams, a 2–1 win at Hampden in the 1927 British Home Championship that gave England a share of the championship with Scotland.

The Scottish Football League XI had lost 6–2 to the Football League at Hampden on 10 March. An international trial match was played on the following Tuesday between the Anglos and Home Scots. (Note: Scottish players playing in the English league, opposing Scottish players playing in the Scottish league.) The two sides for that game, a 1–1 draw on 13 March, were as follows:

Home Scots: Jack Harkness (Queen's Park); Dougie Gray (Rangers), Willie McStay (captain, Celtic); James Kennedy (Falkirk), Alex Lambie (Partick Thistle), Tully Craig (Rangers); Peter Gavigan (St Johnstone), Stewart Chalmers (Queen's Park), David McCrae (St Mirren), Bob McPhail (Airdrieonians), Adam McLean (Celtic).

Anglo Scots: Jock Crawford (Blackburn Rovers); James Nelson (Cardiff City), John Smith (Middlesbrough); Johnny Duncan (Leicester City), Tom Bradshaw (Bury), Jimmy McMullan (Manchester City); David Robbie (Bury), Arthur Lochhead (Leicester City), Tommy Jennings (Leeds United), Alex James (Preston North End), George McLachlan (Cardiff City).

A large crowd gathered outside the Scottish Football Association offices to hear the official announcement of the team to face England. The selection came as a surprise and caused much controversy, as regulars Davie Meiklejohn, Jimmy McGrory, Bob McPhail and Willie McStay were omitted. The Anglos appeared to be favoured, with eight players from The Football League selected to play. Tom Bradshaw had been picked to make his international debut; he would have the unenviable task of marking Dixie Dean, the prolific Everton goalscorer. Hughie Gallacher was also selected despite having not played for two months due to serving a suspension for pushing a referee into a bath.

The Scottish media was unimpressed by the selection, with the Daily Record commenting simply that "it's not a great side." Four of the England side were playing for Huddersfield Town, one of the strongest League sides at the time, and Dixie Dean was nearing the end of his record 60-goal league season. The received opinion was that England would win, as the Scottish side were not only considered to be less talented than their counterparts, but also less physically powerful. Of the forward line of Alex Jackson, James Dunn, Gallacher, Alex James and Alan Morton, Jackson was the tallest at just 5 ft 7 in (1.70 m).

Nonetheless, there was still great excitement in Scotland ahead of the game, with 11 special trainloads of supporters travelling from Glasgow to London on the Friday night before the game. The Scottish players stayed at the Regent Palace hotel, where the captain Jimmy McMullan said: "The [SFA] President (Robert Campbell) wants us to discuss football but you all know what's expected of you tomorrow. All I've got to say is, go to your bed, put your head on your pillow and pray for rain." Rain would mean a heavy pitch, which would suit the small Scottish forwards. McMullan's prayers were answered as London awoke to heavy rain.

== The match ==
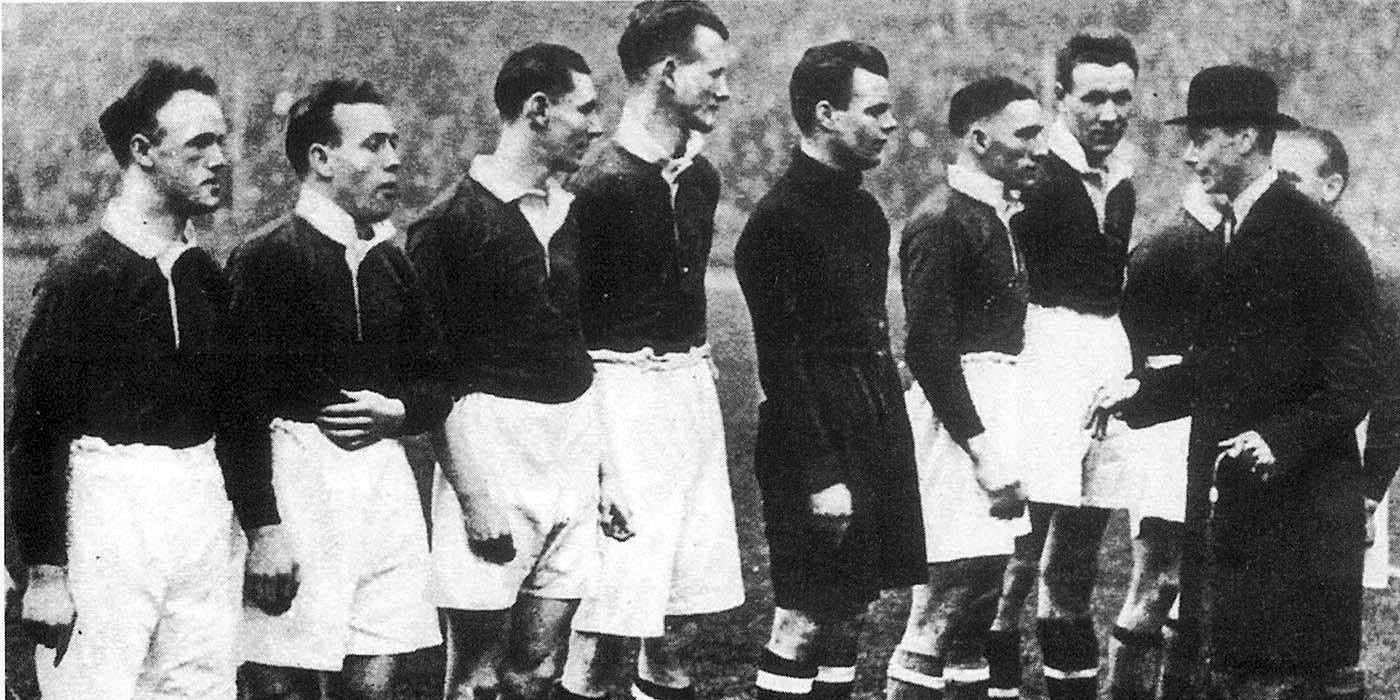
'The Wembley Wizards' being introduced to the Duke of York before the match

The game had a dramatic opening, with Billy Smith hitting the post in the first attack of the game with Scottish goalkeeper Jack Harkness beaten. Scotland immediately responded; Alan Morton received the ball on the left wing and crossed for Alex Jackson to head in the opening goal after just three minutes. The performances of Morton and Jackson on the wings forced English defenders wide to combat them, which left space for Dunn, Gallacher and James to exploit. A resolute performance by the English defence kept Scotland at bay for most of the first half, but with just one minute remaining before half-time, Alex James beat Ted Hufton in the England goal with a left-foot shot.

What followed in the second half was one of the most memorable 45 minutes in Scottish football history. Conditions did not improve, yet the Scots raised their game further, dominating the game. The third Scottish goal, 20 minutes into the second half, was similar to their first, as Morton took the ball almost to the corner flag before sending over another precision cross which Jackson met with his head. Moments after this third goal, James made the score 0–4, ably assisted by Gallacher. Jackson converted another cross from Morton with five minutes left on the clock to complete his hat-trick and to make the score 0–5. England were well beaten but, with a minute to go, Bob Kelly struck a free-kick past Jack Harkness to make the final score England 1–5 Scotland. At the end of the game the rain-sodden crowd applauded the away team's performance.

31 March 1928
12:30

| England | 1–5 | Scotland |
|---|---|---|
| Bob Kelly 89' | | Alex Jackson 3', 65', 85'; Alex James 44', 74' |

Wembley Stadium, London
Attendance: 80,868
Referee: Willie Bell (Scotland) (Note: The practice of an 'away' side providing the referee was well established in the 1920s. Scottish referee Tom Doughray had refereed the England v Scotland matches played in 1920, 1922, 1924 and 1926.)

| England | Scotland |

| GK | Ted Hufton (West Ham United) |
| FB | Roy Goodall (Huddersfield Town) (c) |
| FB | Herbert Jones (Blackburn Rovers) |
| RH | Willis Edwards (Leeds United) |
| CH | Thomas Wilson (Huddersfield Town) |
| LH | Henry Healless (Blackburn Rovers) |
| RW | Joe Hulme (Arsenal) |
| IR | Bob Kelly (Huddersfield Town) |
| CF | Dixie Dean (Everton) |
| IL | Joe Bradford (Birmingham) |
| LW | Billy Smith (Huddersfield Town) |

| GK | Jack Harkness (Queen's Park) |
| FB | James Nelson (Cardiff City) |
| FB | Tommy Law (Chelsea) |
| RH | Jimmy Gibson (Aston Villa) |
| CH | Tom Bradshaw (Bury) |
| LH | Jimmy McMullan (Manchester City) (c) |
| RW | Alex Jackson (Huddersfield Town) |
| IR | James Dunn (Hibernian) |
| CF | Hughie Gallacher (Newcastle United) |
| IL | Alex James (Preston North End) |
| LW | Alan Morton (Rangers) |

== Aftermath ==
When asked for his comment after the game, Alex James simply beamed a smile and said, "We could have had ten!"

Back in Scotland the pubs did rather well and the newspapers were not slow in piling praise on the heads of those little no-hopers of the Scottish side. The Glasgow Herald was a typical example when they said: "Want of height was looked upon as a handicap to the Scots' attack, but the Scottish forwards had the ability and skill of such high degree as to make their physical shortcomings of little consequence." Scotland skipper Jimmy McMullan took time out from the after match celebrations to comment on the way he saw the game:

I want to emphasise that all our forwards are inherently clever. ... But I wish to say that the English tactics were wrong. The Saxon wing-halves paid more attention to the wingers than the inside forwards – therefore the latter were given a lot of space. It is a common thing in England to let wing halves, and not fullbacks, mark the wingers. It doesn’t pay and I don’t know why they pursue it.

It was a gentlemanly comment, as he did not belittle the English effort or try to elevate his own side to the abnormal, but merely made an observation which was probably just about right. By adopting those tactics, England placed themselves at the mercy of a much-underrated Scotland attack. The rain made matters worse for England too.

It was also a historic day in the story of Wembley Stadium. In a booklet published by the stadium owners in 1945, the story is told like this:

English football fans shudder when the year 1928 is mentioned. The traditional enemy, Scotland came to Wembley and gave the Sassenachs a first class lesson in the art of playing football. So much so that, to this day, that Scottish team is still spoken of as 'The Wembley Wizards'.

All Scotland seemed to come to town for that match, and the fans actually brought their own scaling ladders to make sure of getting into the stadium. As a result of this, Wembley afterwards became a barbed wire fortress.

The King and Queen of Afghanistan were among the mammoth crowd who saw the Scots make rings around England. It was Scotland’s day without a doubt. Alan Morton, Glasgow Rangers' Wee Blue Devil, and Alex Jackson, then with Huddersfield and later with Chelsea, were on the Scottish wings and the English defenders just couldn’t do anything about them. Also of course there was the great Alex James – he of long pants who rarely scored a goal but made openings for hundreds.

Ivan Sharpe, the ex-player and writer, commented on the victory for the Athletic News: "England were not merely beaten. They were bewildered – run to a standstill, made to appear utterly inferior by a team whose play was as cultured and beautiful as I ever expect to see." More than 30 years later he was still writing the same thing, adding that he had never seen a performance to match it in all the time that he had been watching football.

The Wizards were never selected again en masse for an international match. Tom Bradshaw never played another game for Scotland, despite effectively marking Dixie Dean out of the game. Bradshaw was the last surviving member of the victorious Scotland side, dying in February 1986 at the age of 82, four months after the death of goalkeeper Jack Harkness at the age of 78. The last survivor from the losing side was Joe Hulme, who died in September 1991 at the age of 87.
