= Jim Barron (footballer, born 1913) =

English footballer

James Barron
Personal information
- Full name: James Barron
- Date of birth: 19 July 1913
- Place of birth: Burnhope, County Durham, England
- Date of death: 15 September 1969 (aged 56)
- Place of death: Newcastle upon Tyne, England
- Height: 5 ft 9 1/2 in (1.77 m)
- Position: Goalkeeper

Senior career*
Years	Team	Apps	(Gls)
- Durham City
- Blyth Spartans
1935–1946	Blackburn Rovers	79	(0)
1946–1947	Darlington	23	(0)
- * Club domestic league appearances and goals

James Barron (19 July 1913 – 15 September 1969) was an English professional footballer who played as a goalkeeper.

Barron played for Durham City and Blyth Spartans, before joining Blackburn Rovers, for whom he made his debut in April 1936. During the Second World War, he played in the North-Eastern League in County Durham, where he was engaged on munitions work. He returned to Blackburn as a guest player for the 1940 Football League War Cup Final, which the Rovers lost to West Ham United. Barron saved a shot from George Foreman before Sam Small scored on the rebound. He resumed his career after the war with Darlington.

His son, Jim Barron, played as a goalkeeper for a number of Football League clubs, making over 400 appearances.
