= 1927–28 Newport County A.F.C. season =

Welsh association football club season

Newport County
1927–28 season
- Manager: Jimmy Hindmarsh
- Stadium: Somerton Park
- Third Division South: 9th
- FA Cup: 1st round
- Welsh Cup: 6th round
- Top goalscorer: League: Waterston (27); All: Waterston (27)
- Highest home attendance: 9,600 vs Swindon Town (FA Cup, 26 Nov 1927)
- Lowest home attendance: 2,108 vs Exeter City (22 March 1928)
- Average home league attendance: 4,533
Home colours	Away colours

The 1927–28 season was Newport County's eighth season in the Football League, seventh season in the Third Division South and eighth season overall in the third tier.

== Season review ==
=== Results summary ===
Overall								Home						Away					
Pld	W	D	L	GF	GA	GAv	Pts	W	D	L	GF	GA	Pts	W	D	L	GF	GA	Pts
42	18	9	15	81	84	0.964	45	12	5	4	52	38	29	6	4	11	29	46	16

Source: rsssf.com

=== Results by round ===
Round	1	2	3	4	5	6	7	8	9	10	11	12	13	14	15	16	17	18	19	20	21	22	23	24	25	26	27	28	29	30	31	32	33	34	35	36	37	38	39	40	41	42
Ground	A	H	H	A	A	H	A	H	A	H	A	H	A	H	A	A	A	H	H	A	A	H	H	A	H	A	H	A	H	A	H	H	A	H	A	H	A	H	A	H	H	A
Result	L	W	W	L	W	W	L	D	W	D	D	W	D	L	L	D	W	W	L	L	W	D	W	L	D	W	W	L	W	L	W	W	L	L	D	W	W	D	L	L	W	L
Position	13	10	8	13	8	6	9	9	9	8	9	6	7	8	10	10	7	6	9	9	9	9	8	9	9	8	6	8	8	8	9	7	8	10	10	9	7	7	8	8	7	9

Updated to match(es) played on 5 May 1928. Source: statto.com
A = Away; H = Home; W = Win; D = Draw; L = Loss

== Fixtures and results ==
=== Third Division South ===
Date	Opponents	Venue	Result	Scorers	Attendance
27 Aug 1927	Queens Park Rangers	A	2–4	Gittins, Barratt	15,489
1 Sep 1927	Brighton & Hove Albion	H	3–1	Weaver 2, Waterson	6,146
3 Sep 1927	Watford	H	3–2	Gittins 2, Waterston	7,362
10 Sep 1927	Charlton Athletic	A	2–3	Prichard, Weaver	7,946
14 Sep 1927	Brighton & Hove Albion	A	4–1	Weaver 3, Pick	3,700
17 Sep 1927	Bristol Rovers	H	3–1	Gittins, Brittan, Weaver	7,862
24 Sep 1927	Plymouth Argyle	A	0–2		10,011
1 Oct 1927	Merthyr Town	H	1–1	Brittan	3,147
8 Oct 1927	Walsall	A	3–0	Pick 2, Weaver	11,738
15 Oct 1927	Gillingham	H	1–1	Barratt	6,589
22 Oct 1927	Luton Town	A	1–1	Maidment	5,192
29 Oct 1927	Brentford	H	3–0	Maidment, Barratt, Weaver	5,790
5 Nov 1927	Bournemouth & Boscombe Athletic	A	0–0		5,324
12 Nov 1927	Millwall	H	1–3	Waterston	5,727
19 Nov 1927	Crystal Palace	A	0–2		8,683
3 Dec 1927	Torquay United	A	1–1	Waterston	3,489
17 Dec 1927	Northampton Town	A	2–1	Gittins, Waterston	8,945
24 Dec 1927	Southend United	H	3–2	Gittins 2, Waterston	3,837
26 Dec 1927	Swindon Town	H	1–3	Young	3,610
27 Dec 1927	Swindon Town	A	1–4	Waterston	9,715
7 Jan 1928	Watford	A	3–2	Harper, Waterston	5,972
14 Jan 1928	Norwich City	H	2–2	Waterston 2	2,875
21 Jan 1928	Charlton Athletic	H	4–3	Waterston 4	3,737
28 Jan 1928	Bristol Rovers	A	1–2	Gittins	4,265
4 Feb 1928	Plymouth Argyle	H	1–1	Harpre	3,502
11 Feb 1928	Merthyr Town	A	2–0	Gittins 2	2,229
18 Feb 1928	Walsall	H	4–1	Brittan 3, Gittins	5,561
25 Feb 1928	Gillingham	A	0–4		5,932
3 Mar 1928	Luton Town	H	7–2	Waterston 3, Gittins 2, Harper, Pick	3,995
10 Mar 1928	Brentford	A	1–3	Waterston	5,759
17 Mar 1928	Bournemouth & Boscombe Athletic	H	4–3	Gittins 2, Waterston, Brittan	3,754
22 Mar 1928	Exeter City	H	1–0	Gittins	2,108
24 Mar 1928	Millwall	A	1–5	Richardson	15,558
6 Apr 1928	Queens Park Rangers	H	1–6	Thomas	5,918
7 Apr 1928	Norwich City	A	1–1	Thomas	7,641
9 Apr 1928	Coventry City	H	3–0	Waterston 3	5,170
10 Apr 1928	Coventry City	A	2–0	Waterston, Young	10,295
14 Apr 1928	Torquay United	H	2–2	Waterston, Barratt	3,199
21 Apr 1928	Exeter City	A	1–5	Gittins	4,912
26 Apr 1928	Crystal Palace	H	0–3		2,554
28 Apr 1928	Northampton Town	H	4–1	Waterston 2, Harper, Gittins	2,753
5 May 1928	Southend United	A	1–5	Waterston	4,796

=== FA Cup ===
Round	Date	Opponents	Venue	Result	Scorers	Attendance
1	26 Nov 1927	Swindon Town	H	0–1		9,600

=== Welsh Cup ===
Round	Date	Opponents	Venue	Result	Scorers	Attendance
5	1 Mar 1928	Holywell	H	W/O		
6	29 Mar 1928	Rhyl	A	1–3	Barratt	

== League table ==
Pos	Team	Pld	W	D	L	F	A	GA	Pts
1	Millwall	42	30	5	7	127	50	2.540	65
2	Northampton Town	42	23	9	10	102	64	1.594	55
3	Plymouth Argyle	42	23	7	12	85	54	1.574	53
4	Brighton & Hove Albion	42	19	10	13	81	69	1.174	48
5	Crystal Palace	42	18	12	12	79	72	1.097	48
6	Swindon Town	42	19	9	14	90	69	1.304	47
7	Southend United	42	20	6	16	80	64	1.250	46
8	Exeter City	42	17	12	13	70	60	1.167	46
9	Newport County	42	18	9	15	81	84	0.964	45
10	Queens Park Rangers	42	17	9	16	72	71	1.014	43
11	Charlton Athletic	42	15	13	14	60	70	0.857	43
12	Brentford	42	16	8	18	76	74	1.027	40
13	Luton Town	42	16	7	19	94	87	1.080	39
14	Bournemouth & Boscombe Athletic	42	13	12	17	72	79	0.911	38
15	Watford	42	14	10	18	68	78	0.872	38
16	Gillingham	42	13	11	18	62	81	0.765	37
17	Norwich City	42	10	16	16	66	70	0.943	36
18	Walsall	42	12	9	21	75	101	0.743	33
19	Bristol Rovers	42	14	4	24	67	93	0.720	32
20	Coventry City	42	11	9	22	67	96	0.698	31
21	Merthyr Town	42	9	13	20	53	91	0.582	31
22	Torquay United	42	8	14	20	53	103	0.515	30

Key	
	Division Champions
	Re-elected
	Failed re-election

P = Matches played; W = Matches won; D = Matches drawn; L = Matches lost; F = Goals for; A = Goals against; GA = Goal average; Pts = Points
