= 1935–36 Welsh Cup =

Tournament details
- Country: Wales
- Teams: 66

Final positions
- Champions: (England) Crewe Alexandra
- Runners-up: (England) Chester

Tournament statistics
- Matches played: 71
- Goals scored: 286 (4.03 per match)

The 1935–36 FAW Welsh Cup is the 55th season of the annual knockout tournament for competitive football teams in Wales.

== Key ==
League name pointed after clubs name.

- B&DL - Birmingham & District League
- CCL - Cheshire County League
- FL D2 - Football League Second Division
- FL D3N - Football League Third Division North
- FL D3S - Football League Third Division South
- MWL - Mid-Wales Football League
- SFL - Southern Football League
- WLN - Welsh League North
- WLS D1 - Welsh League South Division One
- WLS D2 - Welsh League South Division Two
- W&DL - Wrexham & District Amateur League

== First round ==
Tie no	Home	Score	Away
1	Portmadog (WLN)	2–1	Holyhead Town (WLN)
2	Llanfairfechan Town (WLN)	4–2	Penrhyn Quarry (WLN)
3	Llandudno (WLN)	w/o	Ruthin
4	Mold	2–3	Flint Town (WLN)
5	Caergwrle (W&DL)	0–2	Vron United (W&DL)
6	Coedpoeth (W&DL)	2–2	Cross Street Gwersyllt (W&DL)
replay	Cross Street Gwersyllt (W&DL)	1–0	Coedpoeth (W&DL)
7	Wynnstay (W&DL)	3–3	Llay Welfare (W&DL)
replay	Llay Welfare (W&DL)	6–2	Wynnstay (W&DL)
8	Gwersyllt (W&DL)	1–2	Druids (W&DL)
9	Llay United	2–0	Brymbo Green (W&DL)
10	Bala Town	3–2	Dolgelley Albion
11	Llanidloes Town (MWL)	4–1	Caersws (MWL)
12	Welshpool (MWL)	0–4	Newtown (MWL)
13	Aberystwyth Town (MWL)	4–1	Towyn (MWL)
14	Machynlleth (MWL)	3–1	Aberdovey (MWL)
15	Builth Wells	w/o	Brecon
16	Llandrindod Wells	1–4	Rhayader
17	Blaina Town	0–1	Pontymister United

== Second round ==
17 winners from the First round plus three new clubs.

Tie no	Home	Score	Away
1	Llanidloes Town (MWL)	7–0	Newtown (MWL)
2	Aberystwyth Town (MWL)	2–1	Machynlleth (MWL)
3	'Bala Town	4–3	Blaenau Ffestiniog (WLN)
4	Flint Town (WLN)	3–1	Portmadog (WLN)
5	Llandudno (WLN)	4–4	Llanfairfechan Town (WLN)
replay	Llanfairfechan Town (WLN)	4–6	Llandudno (WLN)
6	Llanerch Celts (W&DL)	2–0	Llay Welfare (W&DL)
7	Llay United	0–0	Cross Street Gwersyllt (W&DL)
replay	Cross Street Gwersyllt (W&DL)	3–1	Llay United
8	Druids (W&DL)	5–0	Vron United (W&DL)
9	'Rhayader	w/o	Builth Wells
10	Pontymister United	1–3	Milford Haven

== Third round ==
Ten winners from the Second round plus 18 new teams.

Tie no	Home	Score	Away
1	Rhayader	0–1	Aberystwyth Town (MWL)
2	Flint Town (WLN)	0–3	Macclesfield (CCL)
3	Rhyl (B&DL)	5–1	Colwyn Bay (WLN)
4	Cross Street Gwersyllt (W&DL)	2–9	Bangor City (B&DL & WLN)
5	Llanerch Celts (W&DL)	1–3	Druids (W&DL)
6	Llandudno (WLN)	0–2	Oswestry Town (B&DL)
7	Llanidloes Town (MWL)	2–1	Hereford United (B&DL)
8	Aberdare Town (WLS D1)	5–0	Penrhiwceiber (WLS D1)
9	Lovell's Athletic (WLS D1)	4–1	Gelli Colliery (WLS D1)
10	Barry (WLS D1 & SFL)	8–0	Porth United (WLS D1)
11	Cardiff Corinthians (WLS D1)	1–2	Aberaman (WLS D1)
12	Milford Haven	3–3	Caerau Athletic (WLS D1)
replay	Caerau Athletic (WLS D1)	3–1	Milford Haven
13	Troedyrhiw (WLS D1)	1–3	Llanelly (WLS D1)
14	'Bala Town	w/o	Kidderminster Harriers (B&DL)

== Fourth round ==
Tie no	Home	Score	Away
1	Llanidloes Town (MWL)	1–0	Aberystwyth Town (MWL)
2	Aberdare Town (WLS D1)	2–0	Aberaman (WLS D1)
3	Lovell's Athletic (WLS D1)	1–1	Barry (WLS D1 & SFL)
replay	Barry (WLS D1 & SFL)	1–3	Lovell's Athletic (WLS D1)
4	Caerau Athletic (WLS D1)	1–0	Llanelly (WLS D1)
5	Rhyl (B&DL)	5–1	Macclesfield (CCL)
6	Bala Town	1–2	Druids (W&DL)
7	Bangor City (B&DL & WLN)	1–1	Oswestry Town (B&DL)
replay	Oswestry Town (B&DL)	0–1	Bangor City (B&DL & WLN)

== Fifth round ==
Four winners from the Fourth round. Lovell's Athletic, Rhyl and Bangor City get a bye to the Sixth round.

Tie no	Home	Score	Away
1	Aberdare Town (WLS D1)	9–1	Caerau Athletic (WLS D1)
2	Llanidloes Town (MWL)	2–1	Druids (W&DL)

== Sixth round ==
Two winners from the Fifth round, Lovell's Athletic, Rhyl and Bangor City plus eleven new clubs.

Tie no	Home	Score	Away
1	Swansea Town (FL D2)	1–0	Newport County (FL D3S)
2	Cardiff City (FL D3S)	2–1	Bristol City (FL D3S)
3	Lovell's Athletic (WLS D1)	1–4	Aberdare Town (WLS D1)
4	New Brighton (FL D3N)	1–8	Shrewsbury Town (B&DL)
5	Llanidloes Town (MWL)	3–4	Bangor City (B&DL & WLN)
6	Chester (FL D3N)	2–1	Southport (FL D3N)
7	Wrexham (FL D3N)	1–1	Rhyl (B&DL)
replay	Rhyl (B&DL)	2–1	Wrexham (FL D3N)
8	Tranmere Rovers (FL D3N)	w/o	Crewe Alexandra (FL D3N)

== Seventh round ==
Tie no	Home	Score	Away
1	Rhyl (B&DL)	2–1	Cardiff City (FL D3S)
2	Aberdare Town (WLS D1)	3–1*	Shrewsbury Town (B&DL)
replay	Shrewsbury Town (B&DL)	4–1	Aberdare Town (WLS D1)
3	Chester (FL D3N)	4–1	Swansea Town (FL D2)
4	Bangor City (B&DL & WLN)	1–1	Crewe Alexandra (FL D3N)
replay	Crewe Alexandra (FL D3N)	2–0	Bangor City (B&DL & WLN)

== Semifinal ==
First match between Shrewsbury Town and Crewe Alexandra were held in Bangor, replay at Rhyl.

Tie no	Home	Score	Away
1	Rhyl (B&DL)	0–3	Chester (FL D3N)
2	Shrewsbury Town (B&DL)	0–0	Crewe Alexandra (FL D3N)
replay	Shrewsbury Town (B&DL)	0–4	Crewe Alexandra (FL D3N)

== Final ==
Final were held in Wrexham.

Tie no	Home	Score	Away
1	Crewe Alexandra (FL D3N)	2–0	Chester (FL D3N)
