= Arthur Rigby =

Arthur Rigby may refer to:

- Arthur Rigby (footballer) (1900–1960), English footballer
- Arthur Rigby (actor) (1900–1971), English actor and writer
