= Peter Holland =

Peter Holland may refer to:

- Peter Holland (broadcaster) (born 1947), Australian broadcaster and academic
- Peter Holland (cricketer) (born 1958), New Zealand cricketer
- Peter Holland (ice hockey) (born 1991), Canadian ice hockey player
- Peter R. Holland, English physicist
- Peter Holland (zoologist) (born 1963), British zoologist
- Peter Holland (footballer) (1898–1963), English footballer
