= 1928 FA Cup final =

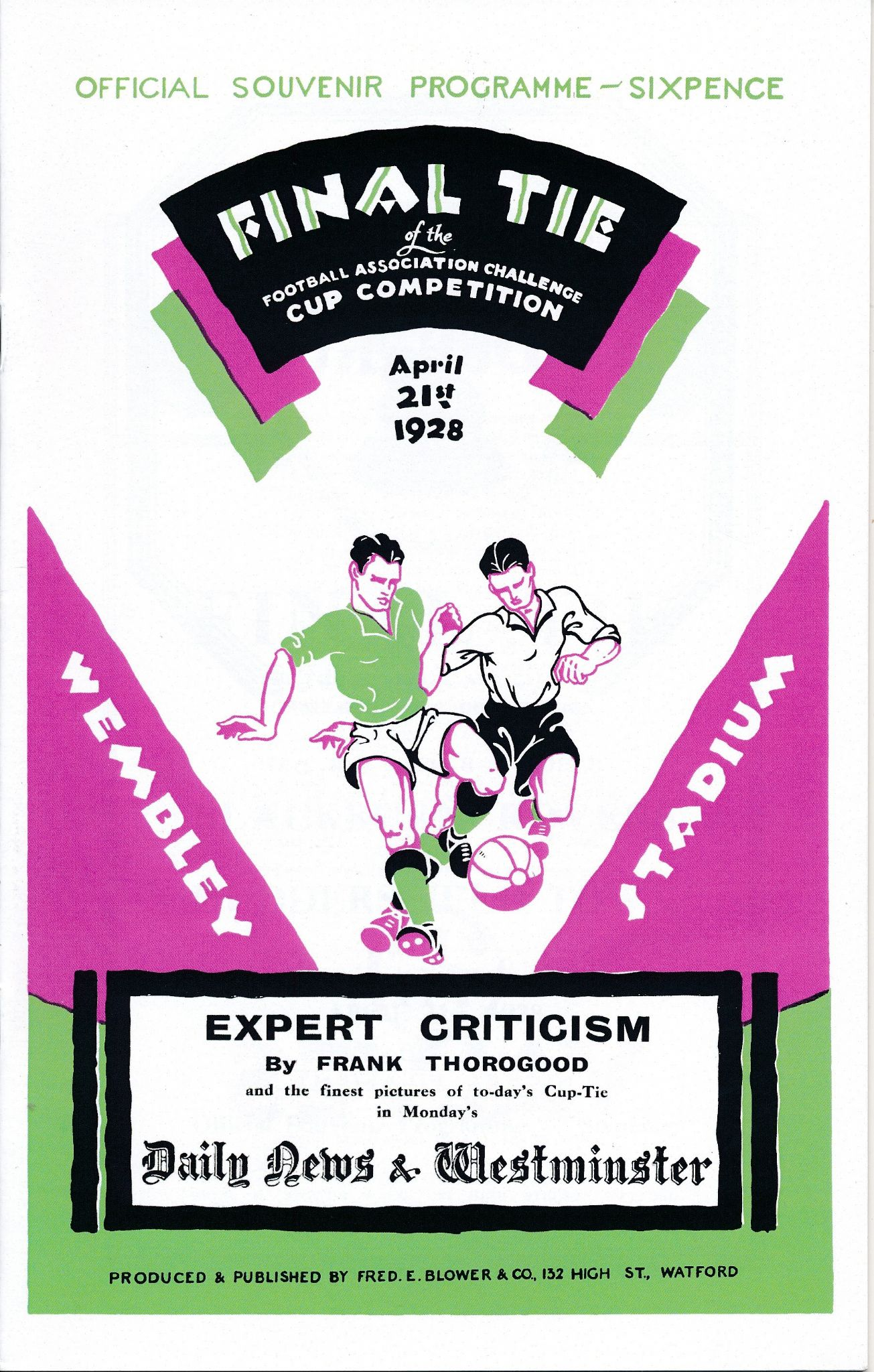
- Official programme
- Event: 1927–28 FA Cup
Blackburn Rovers	Huddersfield Town
3	1
- Date: 21 April 1928
- Venue: Wembley Stadium, London
- Referee: T.G. Bryan (Willenhall)
- Attendance: 92,041

The 1928 FA Cup final was contested by Blackburn Rovers and Huddersfield Town at Wembley Stadium. Blackburn won 3–1, with goals from Jack Roscamp (2) and Tommy McLean. Alex Jackson scored Huddersfield's goal, making this the first final in 18 years where both teams scored. It was the last major trophy that Blackburn Rovers would win for the next 67 years, their next major honour being the FA Premier League title in 1995.

== Road to the Final ==
Blackburn Rovers
Round	Opposition	Score
3rd	Newcastle United (h)	4–1
4th	Exeter City (a)	2–2
4th	Exeter City (h)	3–1
5th	Port Vale (h)	2–1
6th	Manchester United (h)	2–0
Semi-final	Arsenal (n)	1–0

Huddersfield Town
Round	Opposition	Score
3rd	Lincoln City (h)	4–2
4th	West Ham United (h)	2–1
5th	Middlesbrough (h)	4–0
6th	Tottenham Hotspur (h)	6–1
Semi-final	Sheffield United (n)	0–0
Semi-final	Sheffield United (n)	1–0

== Match details ==
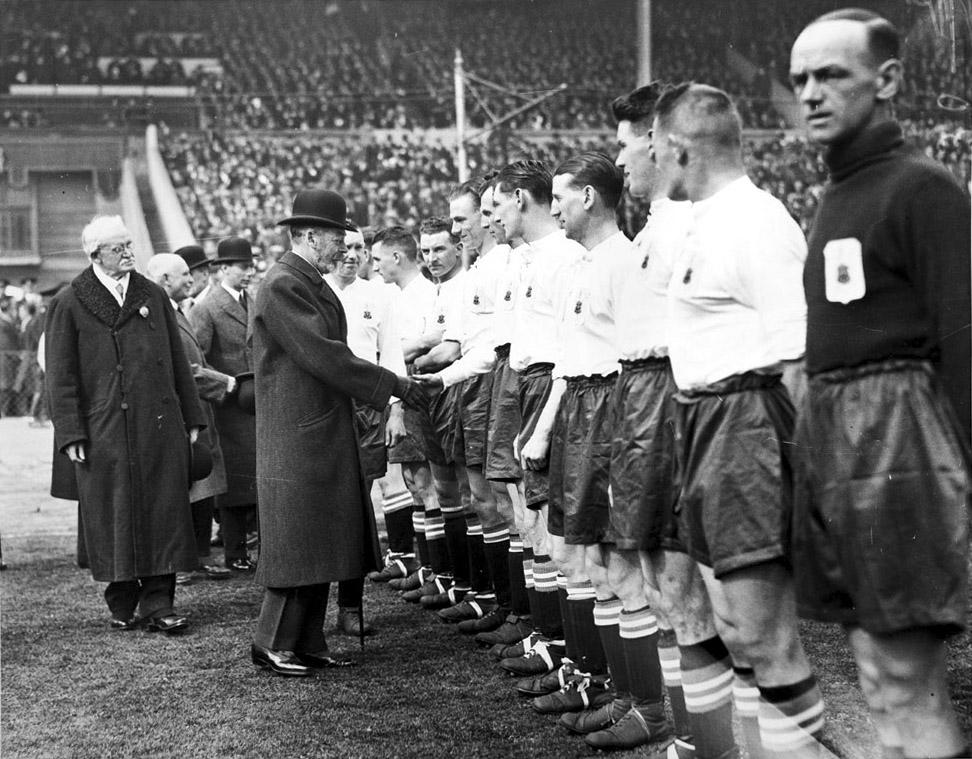
King George V greeting players before the match

1928-04-21
15:00 BST

Blackburn Rovers	3–1	Huddersfield Town
Roscamp 1', 85'; McLean 22'	(Report)	Jackson 55'

Wembley Stadium, London
Attendance: 92,041
Referee: T.G. Bryan (Willenhall)

Blackburn Rovers	Huddersfield Town

GK	(Scotland) Jock Crawford
DF	(Scotland) Jock Hutton
DF	(England) Herbert Jones
MF	(England) Harry Healless (c)
MF	(Scotland) Willie Rankin
MF	(England) Austen Campbell
FW	(England) George Thornewell
FW	(England) Syd Puddefoot
FW	(England) Jack Roscamp
FW	(England) Tommy McLean
FW	(England) Arthur Rigby
Manager:
(England) Bob Crompton

GK	(England) Billy Mercer
DF	(England) Roy Goodall
DF	(England) Ned Barkas
MF	(England) Levi Redfern
MF	(England) Tom Wilson
MF	(Scotland) David Steele
FW	(Scotland) Alex Jackson
FW	(England) Bob Kelly
FW	(England) George Brown
FW	(England) Clem Stephenson (c)
FW	(England) Billy Smith
Manager:
(Scotland) Jack Chaplin

Match rules

- 90 minutes.
- 30 minutes of extra-time if necessary.
- Replay if scores still level.
