= William Hough =

William Hough may refer to:

- William Hough (bishop) (1859–1934), Anglican bishop of Woolwich
- William Bevin Hough (1929–2019), New Zealand sportsman
- William J. Hough (1795–1869), United States Representative from New York
- William R. Hough, investment banker and benefactor of the University of Florida
- Willie Hough (1892–1976), Irish hurler
- Bill Hough, British tennis player in the 1951 Wimbledon Championships – Men's Singles
- Billy Hough, one of the founders of American theater company The Gold Dust Orphans
- Billy Hough (footballer) (1908–?), Welsh professional footballer
