= Charlie Walker (footballer, born 1911) =

English footballer (1911–1990)

Personal information
- Full name: Charles Edward Walker
- Date of birth: 14 May 1911
- Place of birth: Nottingham, England
- Date of death: 7 May 1990 (aged 78)
- Place of death: Jacksonville, Florida, US
- Height: 5 ft 10 1/2 in (1.79 m)
- Position: Left-back

Senior career*
Years	Team	Apps	(Gls)
1935–1936	Arsenal	0	(0)
1935–1936	→ Margate (loan)		
1936–1939	West Ham United	110	(0)
1946–1948	Margate		
1948–1951	Ashford Town (Kent)	77	(1)

Managerial career
- 1946–1948: Margate
- 1948–1951: Ashford Town (Kent)
- ?–1953: Ramsgate
- * Club domestic league appearances and goals

Charles Edward Walker (14 May 1911 – 7 May 1990) was an English footballer who played as a left-back in the Football League for West Ham United.

Born in Nottingham, Walker started his career at Arsenal. He spent a period on loan to Arsenal's nursery club Margate, but never played a first-team game for Arsenal themselves, with opportunities limited by the presence of England captain Eddie Hapgood. Walker joined West Ham United in 1936, and went on to make 118 league and cup appearances for the east London club.

After the outbreak of World War II, Walker's three Second Division appearances of 1939–40 were expunged from the records. He played in all but one of the Football League War Cup games of that season, leading to victory at Wembley in June 1940. He also played in 27 matches of the Football League South, which ended with West Ham finishing second in both A and C groups. The following season, he made nine League South appearances, and 1941–42 saw him make two appearances each in the League South and the London War Cup. Walker also played for St Mirren during the war, making nine appearances in the Southern League during the 1942–43 season. He saw service with the Royal Air Force and toured the Far East.

Walker played in 21 games of the first peacetime League South season of 1945–46, which included pre-war First and Second Division clubs. His last game for West Ham was a 3–3 away draw against Wolves that season.

After this, Walker rejoined Margate as player-manager for two seasons (winning the Kent League). He then moved to Ashford Town (Kent), where he performed a similar role for the following three seasons (winning the Kent League in his first season). He later managed Ramsgate in a part-time capacity.

== Honours ==
- 1937–1938 as a Margate player
  - Southern League Championship winner
  - Southern League Eastern Section winner
  - Southern League Central Section winner
  - Kent Senior Cup Winner
  - Kent Senior Shield Winner
- 1939–1940 as a West Ham player
  - Football League War Cup Final winner
- 1946–1947 as Margate player/manager
  - Kent League winner
- 1947–1948 as Margate player/manager
  - Kent League winner
  - Kent League Cup winner
  - Kent Senior Shield Winner
- 1948–1949 as Ashford Town player/coach
  - Kent League winner

== Managerial statistics (League Matches) ==
Team	League	Season	Record				
Team	League	Season	Games	Won	Draw	Loss	Win %
Margate	Kent League	1946–1947	30	16	9	5	53.33
Margate	Kent League	1947–1948	34	24	1	9	70.59
Margate	Total		64	40	10	14	62.50
Ashford Town	Kent League	1948–1949	34	23	6	5	67.65
Ashford Town	Kent League	1949–1950	32	15	8	9	46.88
Ashford Town	Kent League	1950–1951	32	18	7	7	56.25
Ashford Town	Total		98	56	21	21	57.14
Total			162	96	31	35	59.26
