= Margate F.C. =

Association football club in England

Margate
- Full name: Margate Football Club
- Nickname: The Gate
- Founded: 1896; 130 years ago
- Ground: Hartsdown Park
- Capacity: 2,100 (400 seated)
- Chairman: Ricky Owen
- Manager: Jamie Coyle
- League: Isthmian League South East Division
- 2025–26: Isthmian League South East Division, 6th of 22
- Website: margate-fc.co.uk
Home colours	Away colours

Margate Football Club, originally called Margate Town, is an English football club based in the seaside resort of Margate, Kent. The club's first team play in the Isthmian League South East Division. The club was known during the 1980s as Thanet United.

The club was founded in 1896 and joined the Southern Football League in 1933. After a spell in the Kent League after World War II the team returned to the Southern League in 1959 and remained there until 2001 when they gained promotion to the Football Conference, the highest level of English non-League football. Their stay at this level saw the team forced to groundshare with other clubs due to drawn-out and problematic redevelopment work at their Hartsdown Park stadium. The stadium has been the home of Margate FC since 1929, the same year the park itself opened to the public, and during the three years spent away from their own ground, they were expelled from the Conference National and subsequently relegated to the Isthmian League.

The team, nicknamed "The Gate", have to date reached the third round proper of England's premier cup competition, the FA Cup, on two occasions. On the second of these occasions they played Tottenham Hotspur, a First Division team and the reigning UEFA Cup holders.

== History ==
=== Early years ===
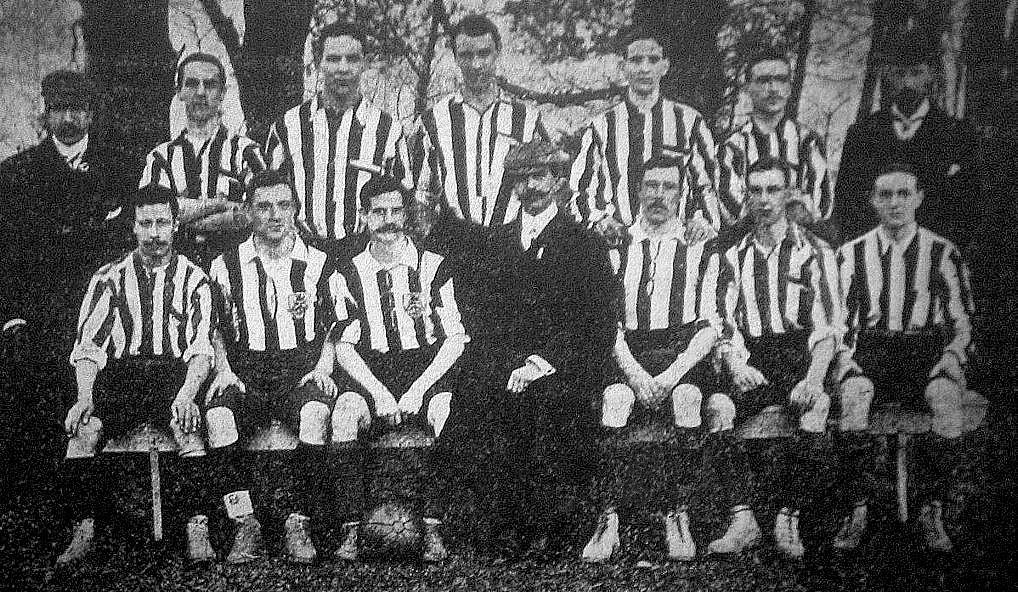
Margate team photo from the 1901–02 season

Margate Football Club was founded in 1896 as an amateur club and was originally called Margate Town, playing friendly matches on local school grounds. In the years before the First World War the club played in several different amateur leagues, with little success, and played at various grounds in the Margate area, before settling on a pitch at what would later become the Dreamland amusement park in 1912. This ground became known as the Hall-by-the-Sea Ground, taking its name from a local dance hall.

=== Inter-war years ===
After the First World War, Margate joined the Kent League, but in 1923 the league suspended the team due to financial irregularities and the club promptly folded. A year later the club reformed, initially under the name Margate Town, and returned to the Kent League, still playing at Dreamland, but folded again due to heavy debts. In 1929 the club reformed again and moved to its present home at Hartsdown Park, leasing part of the park from the local council for conversion into a football stadium. Around this time Margate signed a Dutch player, a highly unusual move in an era when it was almost unknown for Continental players to move to English clubs. Goalkeeper Gerrit "Gerard" Keizer, who joined the Kent club from Ajax Amsterdam, later went on to play for Arsenal.

From 1934 until 1938 Margate, by now playing in the Southern League, served as the official nursery side for Arsenal; under this arrangement the London club regularly loaned promising young players to Margate in order for them to gain match experience. In the second season of this arrangement, 1935–36, Margate reached the third round proper of the FA Cup for the first time, losing 3–1 to Blackpool after defeating Queens Park Rangers and Crystal Palace in the earlier rounds, but shortly after this the club had to step back down to the Kent League for financial reasons.

=== Post-war years ===
After the Second World War, the Gate continued to play in the Kent League under new manager Charlie Walker, who led the team to two Kent League championships but was then controversially sacked. The team slumped during a succession of rapid managerial changes which only ended in 1950 when Almer Hall was appointed manager, a post he was to hold for the next twenty years. Under Hall, the team won a host of local cup honours and reached the rounds proper of the FA Cup on a number of occasions, but never managed to match this success in league competition.

In 1959–60 Margate returned to the Southern League after the Kent League folded, and in 1962–63 won the Division One championship and with it promotion to the Premier Division. Two years later the club turned full-time professional, but this policy proved financially untenable when the team were relegated back to Division One in 1965–66. Nonetheless, they won promotion at the first attempt and returned to the Premier Division in 1967.

During the 1970s, Margate endured severe financial problems and a series of mediocre league seasons, but took part in two famous FA Cup ties. In 1971 the Gate lost 11–0 to Bournemouth, with Ted MacDougall scoring a cup record nine goals. One year later, Margate beat Swansea City and Walton & Hersham to set up a third-round tie against First Division Tottenham Hotspur, then UEFA Cup holders. A record crowd of around 14,500 packed into Hartsdown Park for a match which Margate lost 6–0.

Thanet United badge

In 1981 the club changed its name to Thanet United, a name which was retained until 1989 when the name reverted to Margate. In the final season under the Thanet name, the team achieved its lowest league placing for many years, escaping relegation from the Southern League by just one place.

=== Conference era ===
In 1996, the club's centenary year, the club appointed Chris Kinnear as manager. In 1997–98 he took the team to the first round proper of the FA Cup where they played Fulham in a home tie that drew a crowd of 5,100. Although the Gate took the lead, the Cottagers eventually won 2–1. The following season saw the club finally win promotion to the Southern League Premier Division, albeit only after an appeal was lodged against the league's initial refusal to allow the team promotion due to the club failing to carry out necessary ground improvements in time. The Premier Division championship followed in the 2000–01 season, and with it promotion to the Football Conference.

The 2001–02 season was Gate's first-ever season of Conference football and they finished the season in eighth place. In the 2002–03 season the team began groundsharing at Dover Athletic's Crabble Athletic Ground while redevelopment work took place at Hartsdown Park, but various problems stalled the planned redevelopment. On the pitch, Margate enjoyed more success in the FA Cup when, after defeating Leyton Orient in the first round, they were drawn at home to Cardiff City in the second round, but lost 3–0 at Crabble. The following season, despite finishing sixteenth, the Gate were forcibly relegated one division due to the ongoing delays and problems with the redevelopment plans for Hartsdown Park.

Margate spent the 2004–05 season in the Conference South, now groundsharing at Ashford Town. Amid ongoing issues with the redevelopment work, which at one point made it seem very likely the club would fold completely, Margate were again relegated to the Isthmian League Premier Division.

=== Return to Hartsdown Park ===
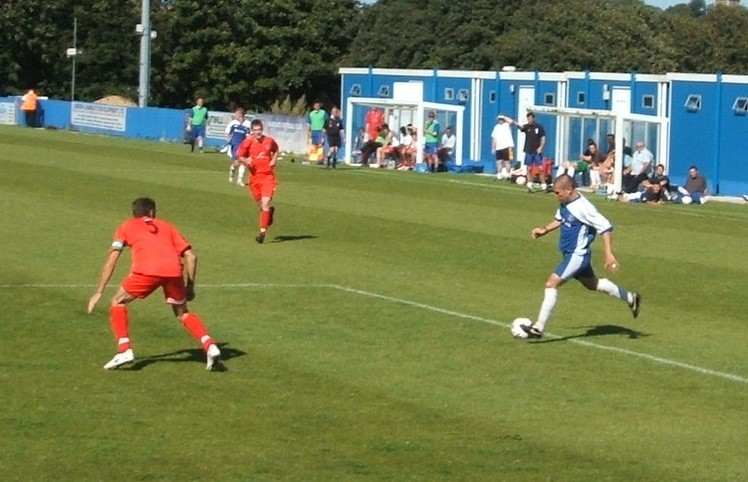
Margate (blue shirts) in action in 2007

In August 2005, Margate returned to Hartsdown Park after three years away. During an indifferent season manager Kinnear was controversially suspended. Robin Trott was placed in temporary charge as player-manager in April 2006 and, after an unbeaten five-game run, was given a one-year contract at the end of the season. After Margate narrowly missed out on the play-offs in 2006–07 the club announced that Trott was to be given a new contract for the 2007–08 season. Shortly before the end of the season, however, Trott was sacked. His replacement, Barry Ashby, was himself sacked two months into the 2008–09 season. Shortly afterwards, the club narrowly avoided being subject to High Court action over unpaid debts to HM Revenue and Customs. The club finished the season in 19th position in the table and was expected to be relegated to Division One South, but was reprieved due to other clubs folding. The following season, Margate again finished in the bottom four but the club again received a reprieve from relegation.

Chris Kinnear returned for a second spell to manage the team at the start of the 2011–12 season. The following season Margate were sitting at the top of the table in January, however, after much speculation, Kinnear accepted the vacant manager's position at Dover Athletic. Goalkeeper Craig Holloway was placed in temporary charge of the side, and brought in Simon Osborn as joint manager. The club dropped from the top of the table and finished outside the play-offs. After a poor start to the 2013–14 season, Holloway resigned his role as joint manager, leaving Osborn in sole charge. Results failed to improve and Osborn was sacked at the beginning of December 2013.

In the 2014–15 season, the first full season under manager Terry Brown, Margate finished in 3rd place in the Isthmian League Premier Division, ensuring the team's qualification for the play-offs for promotion to the National League South (formerly Conference South). The play-offs were delayed by a lengthy appeal against a points deduction applied to fifth-placed Enfield Town, but when they eventually began, Margate defeated Dulwich Hamlet in the semi-finals. In the final Margate played Hendon, who had finished one place above them in the league, but a single goal from Ryan Moss gave them victory and promotion to the National League South. Following a poor start to the 2015–16 season, Terry Brown was sacked. and replaced by Margate goalkeeper Nikki Bull and defender Jamie Stuart until the end of that season. In April 2016 Bull was appointed first team manager, but was unable to prevent the team being relegated. As of 2021 the team continue to play in the Isthmian League Premier Division.

== Colours and crest ==
Margate's modern colours are blue and white, first adopted in 1949, but the team have worn a number of other colour combinations. The club's earliest known colours were black and white, and in the 1930s the team wore amber and black. The club's current crest is a simplified version of the coat of arms of the town of Margate, incorporating a lion conjoined to a ship's hull (a reference to the arms of the Cinque Ports) and the white horse emblem of Kent.

Margate's shirts have borne various sponsors' logos including the pop group Bad Manners, whose name appeared on the team's kit as part of a sponsorship deal with their record label in the late 1990s. Lead singer Buster Bloodvessel was running a hotel in Margate at the time and actually joined the football club's board of directors. Another band, The Libertines, sponsored the club for the 2018–19 season after starting work on a recording studio and hotel in the town.

== Stadium ==
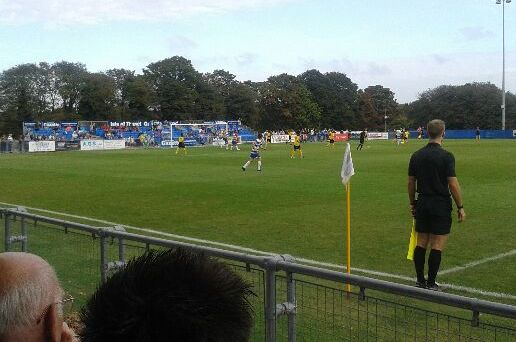
Hartsdown Park photographed in 2014

The stadium in Hartsdown Park has been Margate's home since 1929, the club having used at least six grounds before moving to Hartsdown Park, the same year the park itself opened to the public. Little development of the stadium took place until 2002, when the club launched an ambitious scheme to completely redevelop the site. The club moved out and the old stadium, which was constructed mainly from timber and corrugated iron, was demolished in early 2003, but the local council disputed the plans submitted. Although planned to be completed by August 2003, the redevelopment dragged on for three years, mired in issues regarding planning permission for the commercial facilities the club wanted to build in addition to the stadium itself. The team spent three years ground-sharing with other Kent clubs, but club officials' failure to confirm a return date to Hartsdown led to Margate's expulsion from the Conference National in 2004. In 2005 the club was finally able to return to the ground, albeit with pre-fabricated stands and temporary buildings in place. In 2014, the club applied to the local council for permission to erect six new temporary stands.

The club's ultimate plan involved a stadium with a capacity of 5,000 forming part of a complex incorporating a hotel, fitness centre, conference centre, all-weather pitch and ten 5-a-side pitches. Although it was announced that work on the 5-a-side pitch complex was to begin in May 2007, ground was not in fact broken for a further four months. Finally, after a series of false starts over a nearly 20-year period, the club was able to purchase the freehold of the ground from Thanet District Council in January 2019, leading to the club announcing plans in December 2023 for a complete redevelopment of the stadium, in conjunction with IHG Hotels, scheduled to commence in February 2024.

== Supporters ==
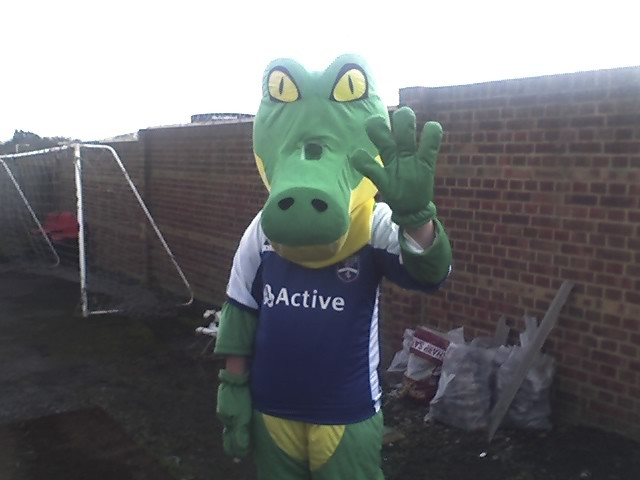
Margate mascot Margator

In the 1920s crowds of up to 3,000 were common at Hartsdown Park, but in the modern era attendances are more modest. At the midpoint of the 2017–18 season, the team's average attendance was 507. This was third highest in the Isthmian League Premier Division behind Dulwich Hamlet and Billericay Town. During their three seasons in the Conference National, from 2001–02 to 2003–04, the club's average home attendances were 1,233, 684, and 562.

The club has an active independent supporters' association. The fans took an active part in getting the stadium ready for the club's return in 2005.

== Statistics and records ==
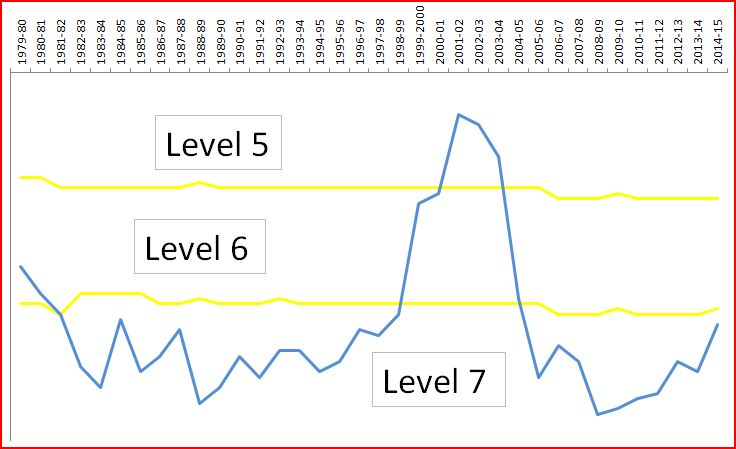
Margate's league positions since the formation of the Alliance Premier League in 1979. Yellow lines represent the breaks between divisions, level numbers refer to the level of the overall English football league system.

Margate's best ever league finish since the establishment of the Alliance Premier League in 1979 was the 8th-place finish in the Conference National (level 5 of the overall English football league system) in 2001–02. The team have twice progressed as far as the third round proper of the FA Cup, in 1935–36 and 1972–73, and reached the quarter-finals of the FA Trophy in 2001–02. The club's biggest victory is 12–1, achieved against Deal Cinque Ports in the FA Cup first qualifying round in 1919 and against Erith & Belvedere in the Kent League in the 1927–28 season. The Gate's heaviest defeat was 11–0 against AFC Bournemouth in the FA Cup first round on 20 November 1971.

The highest recorded attendance at Hartsdown Park was 14,169 for the visit of Tottenham Hotspur in the FA Cup in 1972–73. Margate's all-time appearance record holder is Bob Harrop, who played 564 times. Martin Buglione holds the record for most career goals with 158. Jack Palethorpe holds the record for the most goals scored in a single season, having scored 66 in the 1929–30 season.

== Managers ==
Margate's first known manager was Arthur Graves, who was installed as manager when Margate Town was reformed in 1929. By far the club's longest-serving manager was Almer Hall, who was manager for twenty years from 1950 until 1970. Several former professional players have managed the club, the most high-profile being the former Welsh international Terry Yorath.

== Current squad ==
As of 17 June 2026

Note: Flags indicate national team as defined under FIFA eligibility rules; some limited exceptions apply. Players may hold more than one non-FIFA nationality.

No.	Pos.	Nation	Player
1	GK	ENG	Tom Wray
2	DF	ENG	Harrison Hatfull
4	MF	ENG	Max Walsh
5	DF	ENG	Lewis Knight
6	DF	ENG	Harry Hudson
7	MF	ENG	Tushaun Walters
8	MF	ENG	Sam Blackman
9	FW	ENG	Ibrahim Olutade

No.	Pos.	Nation	Player
10	FW	ENG	Tom Derry
12	MF	ENG	Blu Husthwaite
13	GK	ENG	Reece Hobbs
15	MF	ENG	Kane Haysman
16	MF	ENG	Henry Young
17	DF	ENG	Kai Garande
19	FW	ENG	Kieron Agbebi

== Current staff ==
As of 29 November 2025

Position	Name
Chairman	Ricky Owen
Director	Salim Usman
Club Secretary	Alan Anstice
Manager	Jamie Coyle
Assistant Manager	Matt Longhurst
General Manager	Deny Wilson

== Honours ==
Honour	Year(s)
Isthmian League; Premier Division play-off winners	2014–15
Southern League; Premier Division champions	2000–01
Southern League; Division One champions	1962–63
Southern League; First Division (South) champions	1977–78
Southern League; Central Section champions	1935–36
Southern League; Eastern Section champions	1935–36
Southern League; Midweek Section champions	1936–37
Southern League Cup winners	1967–68, 1997–98
Kent League champions	1932–33, 1937–38, 1946–47, 1947–48
Kent League Cup winners	1947–48, 1953–54
Kent Senior Cup winners	1935–36, 1936–37, 1973–74, 1993–94, 1997–98, 2002–03, 2003–04, 2004–05, 2022–23

== Rivalries ==
Margate's main traditional rivalry is with Thanet neighbours Ramsgate, with whom Margate contest the Thanet derby. Matches between the two teams drew large crowds in the 1960s, but the rivalry has waned in subsequent decades, largely due to the two teams rarely playing in the same league. Another of Margate's rivals is Dover Athletic. Despite similarly meeting rarely in competitive games over recent years, both teams were in the Conference in the 2001–02 season, when the two games between Margate and Dover were watched by a combined total of over 6,000 spectators. The game played at Margate's Hartsdown Park stadium drew a crowd of 3,676, and 2,325 were in attendance for the game at Dover's Crabble stadium.
