= Jack Harkness (footballer, born 1907) =

Scottish footballer

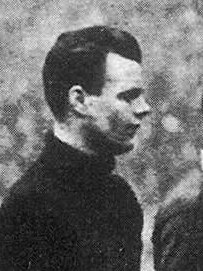
- Harkness prior to the 'Wembley Wizards match, 1928

Personal information
- Full name: John Diamond Harkness
- Date of birth: 27 September 1907
- Place of birth: Glasgow, Scotland
- Date of death: 6 October 1985 (aged 78)
- Place of death: Newton Mearns, Scotland
- Height: 5 ft 10 1/2 in (1.79 m)
- Position: Goalkeeper

Senior career*
Years	Team	Apps	(Gls)
1925–1928	Queen's Park	93	(0)
1928–1937	Heart of Midlothian	292	(0)

International career
1927–1933	Scotland	12	(0)
- * Club domestic league appearances and goals

John Diamond Harkness MBE (27 September 1907 – 6 October 1985) was a Scottish international footballer, best remembered as the goalkeeper in the "Wembley Wizards" Scotland side of 1928.

== Club career ==
After leaving Mount Florida School aged 18, Harkness joined his local side Queen's Park in 1925 and stayed there for three seasons. In line with their Corinthian ideals, he played as an amateur during his spell at Hampden. Despite playing against professional and semi-professional sides, the Spiders managed to maintain a respectable position in Division One and Harkness was soon regarded as a key component in the side. The team also reached the semi-finals of the Scottish Cup in 1928.

In May 1928, Heart of Midlothian lured Harkness, then aged 20, into the professional ranks, making him their highest paid player in the process. Hearts were frequent top five finishers and the increased profile this afforded Harkness allowed him to become a regular international player. The Maroons of this era were a talented yet inconsistent side however, and during his nine seasons in Gorgie, Harkness failed to win any major honours. A prime example of Hearts' unpredictability was season 1932–33, when both title holders Motherwell and eventual champions Rangers were defeated, yet points dropped to lesser sides ensured they only achieved a third-place finish.

Harkness won the admiration of Celtic fans in an incident involving the Glasgow club's forward Jimmy McGrory. During a match McGrory made a dive in an attempt to score with a header; however, Harkness realised McGrory was going to collide against the goalpost, and as such pushed the Celtic player away round the post to protect him from serious injury. The Hoops fans shouted for a penalty and booed Harkness for the remainder of the game. McGrory, however, highlighted his gratitude for the goalkeeper's action and the following season in a game between the two clubs, the Celtic fans gave Harkness a prolonged ovation as he took up his position in goal.

Willie Waugh displaced Harkness as Hearts' regular goalkeeper in 1936–37. After spending the remainder of the season as a reserve, Harkness decided to retire at the comparatively young age of 29, to pursue a career in sports journalism. He wrote for the Sunday Post throughout the 1950s, 1960s and 1970s and was awarded an MBE in 1971.

== International career ==
In total, Harkness played for Scotland on 12 occasions between 1927, when he made his debut in a 2–0 victory over (Northern) Ireland at Windsor Park, and 1933. Scotland won eight and lost four of these matches, with Harkness twice recording a clean sheet.

In 1928, Harkness was selected for the annual Scotland-England match in the Home Championship, a game which was to become part of Scottish football folklore. An unfancied side, in which the entire forward line measured 5' 7" or less, recorded a resounding 5–1 triumph and earned the moniker "the Wembley Wizards".
