= George Thornewell =

English footballer

Personal information
- Full name: George Thornewell
- Date of birth: 8 July 1898
- Place of birth: Romiley, England
- Date of death: 6 March 1986 (aged 87)
- Place of death: Derby, England
- Height: 5 ft 7 in (1.70 m)
- Position: Outside right

Youth career
- St. Dunstan's
- Normanton United

Senior career*
Years	Team	Apps	(Gls)
- Rolls-Royce
- → Nottingham Forest (war guest)
- → Coventry City (war guest)
1919–1927	Derby County	275	(23)
1927–1929	Blackburn Rovers	41	(4)
1929–1932	Chesterfield	84	(10)
1932	Newark Town		
Total		400	(37)

International career
1923–1925	England	4	(1)
- * Club domestic league appearances and goals

George Thornewell (8 July 1898 – 6 March 1986) was an English international footballer, who played as an outside right.

== Early and personal life ==
Born in Romiley, Cheshire, Thornewell and his widowed mother moved to Derby when he was eight months old. His father was a railway inspector, and his mother was a cleaner at the railway office. George was the youngest of eight children, one of whom died as an infant. He had a daughter out of wedlock in 1915, and married in 1921. He worked as a fitter at Rolls-Royce and joined the Royal Air Force in July 1918.

== Career ==
He spent his early career with Sunday school teams St. Dunstan's and Normanton United, before playing for the works team of Rolls-Royce in Derby. During World War I he guested for Nottingham Forest and Coventry City, before signing for Derby County in May 1919. He moved to Blackburn Rovers in December 1927, Chesterfield in August 1929, and Newark Town in February 1932.

For Chesterfield he scored 10 goals in 84 Football League games.

He earned four caps for England between 1923 and 1925, scoring on his debut.

== Later life and death ==
In November 1928 he began running The White Hart Hotel in Duffield, living there with his wife and daughter. He died in Derby on 6 March 1986, aged 87.

== Honours ==
Blackburn Rovers

- FA Cup: 1927–28
