= Arnold Whiteside =

English footballer

Personal information
- Date of birth: 6 November 1911
- Place of birth: Garstang, Lancashire, England
- Date of death: 1994 (aged 82–83)
- Height: 5 ft 6 1/2 in (1.69 m)
- Position: Wing half

Senior career*
Years	Team	Apps	(Gls)
1932–1949	Blackburn Rovers	218	(3)
1949–1950	Wigan Athletic	24	(0)
- * Club domestic league appearances and goals

Arnold Whiteside (6 November 1911 – 1994) was an English footballer who played as a wing half in The Football League for Blackburn Rovers.

== Club career ==
Born in Garstang, Lancashire, Whiteside played as a junior for Woodplumpton Juniors before joining Blackburn in 1932. His career was interrupted by World War II and during this conflict he was a member of the Blackburn side which lost the 1940 Football League War Cup Final. Guesting for Liverpool during World War II, Whiteside returned to Blackburn after the war before moving to Wigan Athletic in 1949. He played over 400 times in all competitions for Blackburn. He spent one season at Wigan, appearing 24 times in the league without scoring.
