= Alfred Robinson (footballer, born 1887) =

English footballer

Personal information
- Full name: Alfred Robinson
- Date of birth: 1887
- Place of birth: Grimsby, England
- Date of death: 1945 (aged 57–58)
- Position: Winger

Senior career*
Years	Team	Apps	(Gls)
1905–1907	St James		
1907–1908	Grimsby St John's		
1908–1909	Grimsby Rovers		
1909–1910	Grimsby Town	2	(0)
1910–1911	Grimsby Rovers		
1911–1912	Cleethorpes Town		
1912–191?	Immingham		
- * Club domestic league appearances and goals

Alfred Robinson (1887 – 1945) was an English professional footballer who played as a winger.
