= Alfred Robinson (footballer, born 1916) =

English footballer (born 1916)

Personal information
- Full name: Alfred Robinson
- Date of birth: 1916
- Place of birth: Boldon, County Durham, England
- Height: 6 ft 0 in (1.83 m)
- Position: Inside forward

Senior career*
Years	Team	Apps	(Gls)
- Washington Colliery
1933–1935	Bolton Wanderers	0	(0)
1935–1936	York City	3	(0)
1948–	Scarborough		
Total		3	(0)
- * Club domestic league appearances and goals

Alfred Robinson (born 1916, date of death unknown) was an English professional footballer who played as an inside forward in the Football League for York City, in non-League football for Washington Colliery and Scarborough, and was on the books of Bolton Wanderers without making a league appearance. He later worked as a coach at Rowntrees.
