= Albert Walmsley (footballer) =

English footballer

Personal information
- Full name: Albert Walmsley
- Date of birth: 21 October 1885
- Place of birth: Blackburn, England
- Date of death: 1964 (aged 78–79)
- Height: 5 ft 10 in (1.78 m)
- Position: Right half

Senior career*
Years	Team	Apps	(Gls)
- Darwen
1907–1920	Blackburn Rovers	272	(6)
1920–1923	Stockport County	80	(3)
- * Club domestic league appearances and goals

Albert Walmsley (21 October 1885 – 1964) was an English professional footballer who played as a right half. As a youth, he assisted Blackburn St. Peter's and later played for Lancashire Combination side Darwen before joining Football League First Division club Blackburn Rovers in 1907. He went on to play 272 league matches in a 13-year spell with the Ewood Park side. Walmsley transferred to Stockport County at the start of the 1920–21 season and spent three years at the club, scoring 3 goals in 80 league appearances.

During the 1915–16 season Walmsley played 21 matches as a wartime guest with Burnley, scoring once.
