= Billy Hough (footballer) =

Welsh footballer

Personal information
- Full name: William Hough
- Date of birth: 4 March 1908
- Place of birth: Greenfield, Holywell, Flintshire, Wales
- Height: 5 ft 7 1/2 in (1.71 m)
- Position: Right-back

Senior career*
Years	Team	Apps	(Gls)
- Holywell Arcadians
- New Brighton
1931–1937	Preston North End		
1937–????	Blackburn		
- * Club domestic league appearances and goals

William Hough (4 March 1908 – ?) was a Welsh professional footballer. He played six seasons for Preston North End before joining Blackburn Rovers in 1937. Characterized as a "steady rather than a showy player", Hough established himself in the right-back position and helped Preston North End get promoted to the First Division in the 1933-34 season. He suffered a series of injuries and didn't see much playing time until his transfer to Blackburn. He subsequently helped Blackburn get promoted to the First Division in the 1938-39 season. He played in the Blackburn side that faced West Ham in the 1940 Football League War Cup Final.
