= Jock Crawford =

Scottish footballer (1902–1973)

Personal information
- Full name: John Chalmers Crawford
- Date of birth: 11 October 1902
- Place of birth: Stirling, Scotland
- Date of death: 1973 (aged 70–71)
- Place of death: Stirling, Scotland
- Position: Goalkeeper

Senior career*
| Years | Team | Apps | (Gls) |
- Fallin Violet
| 1923 | → Stenhousemuir (trial) | 1 | (0) |
| 1923–1925 | Alloa Athletic | 63 | (0) |
| 1925–1933 | Blackburn Rovers | 155 | (0) |
| 1932–1933 | → East Stirlingshire (loan) | 19 | (0) |
- * Club domestic league appearances and goals

John Chalmers Crawford (11 October 1902 – 1973) was a Scottish footballer who played as a goalkeeper.

== Career ==
After starting off at Alloa Athletic, his most prominent spell was at Blackburn Rovers, where he won the FA Cup in 1928. He took part in what proved to be the last Home Scots v Anglo-Scots international trial match in the same year, but this did not lead to a full cap for Scotland. He had to retire due to injury a short time after returning north on loan with East Stirlingshire.

== Honours ==
Blackburn Rovers

- FA Cup: 1927–28
