= Harry Hughes (footballer, born 1929) =

English footballer

Personal information
- Full name: Harold James Hughes
- Date of birth: 8 October 1929
- Place of birth: Nuneaton, England
- Date of death: 15 October 2013 (aged 84)
- Place of death: Weymouth, Dorset, England
- Position: Centre half

Senior career*
Years	Team	Apps	(Gls)
- Symington
1950–1951	Southport	0	(0)
1951–1952	Chelsea	1	(0)
1952–1958	Bournemouth & Boscombe Athletic	77	(2)
1958–1963	Gillingham	204	(14)
1963–19??	Guildford City		
- * Club domestic league appearances and goals

Harold James Hughes (8 October 1929 - 15 October 2013) was an English professional footballer. His clubs included Chelsea, Bournemouth & Boscombe Athletic and Gillingham, where he made over 200 Football League appearances. He was captain of the Bournemouth team that knocked out Wolverhampton Wanderers and Tottenham Hotspur before losing to Manchester United in the quarter-finals of the FA Cup in 1957.
