= Jack Roscamp =

English footballer and manager

Personal information
- Date of birth: 8 August 1901
- Place of birth: Blaydon, England
- Date of death: 1939 (aged 37–38)
- Place of death: England
- Height: 5 ft 10 in (1.78 m)
- Positions: Right-half; centre forward

Youth career
- Wallsend

Senior career*
Years	Team	Apps	(Gls)
1923–1931	Blackburn Rovers	223	(37)
1932–1934	Bradford City	27	(0)
1934	Shrewsbury Town		

Managerial career
- 1934–1935: Shrewsbury Town
- * Club domestic league appearances and goals

Jack Roscamp (8 August 1901 – 1939) was an English footballer, renowned for his physical style of play. He played for Blackburn Rovers, for whom he scored twice in the 1928 FA Cup Final, Bradford City and Shrewsbury Town, who he also went on to manage. He left Town, citing disagreements with their committee, and took up business as a publican, running The Boot Inn at Welshpool.

== Honours ==
Blackburn Rovers

- FA Cup: 1927–28
