= Bob Crompton =

English footballer (1879–1941)

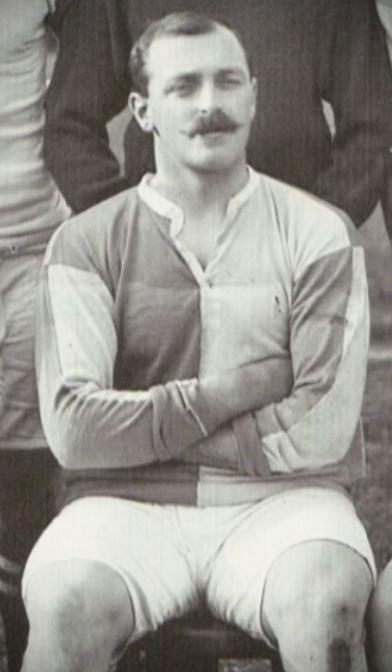

Personal information
- Full name: Robert Crompton
- Date of birth: 26 September 1879
- Place of birth: Blackburn, England
- Date of death: 15 March 1941 (aged 61)
- Place of death: Blackburn, England
- Position: Right back

Senior career*
Years	Team	Apps	(Gls)
1896–1920	Blackburn Rovers	530	(14)
1915–1916	→ Blackpool (guest)	0	(0)

International career
1902–1914	England	41	(0)

Managerial career
- 1926–1931: Blackburn Rovers
- 1935–1936: Bournemouth & Boscombe Athletic
- 1938–1941: Blackburn Rovers
- * Club domestic league appearances and goals

Robert Crompton (26 September 1879 – 15 March 1941) was an English professional footballer. He spent the entirety of his career with his hometown club, Blackburn Rovers. He also represented England on 41 occasions, captaining them 22 times.

== Playing career ==
Born in Blackburn, Crompton spent his entire career at full-back for Blackburn Rovers, playing 528 games between 1896 and 1920. He won the league twice as captain of the team in 1912 and 1914. In the 1915–16 season he played for Blackpool in the regional leagues set up by the Football League during World War I where he was made club captain. His 41 England caps were a record until surpassed by Billy Wright in 1952. He began his career as a centre-half, but it was at full-back that he excelled, Charlie Buchan describing him as "...the outstanding full-back of his time. A commanding personality, he was the best kicker of a ball I ever ran across."

== Managerial career ==
Crompton later went on to manage Blackburn between 1926 and 1930, leading them to the FA Cup victory over Huddersfield Town in 1928. After a spell managing Bournemouth & Boscombe Athletic, Crompton returned to Rovers as manager in the late 1930s to guide them to the Second Division championship.

Crompton had a heart attack in 1941 while watching Blackburn play Burnley, while he was still in charge of Blackburn. His team had just won the match 3–2. He died that evening.

== After retirement and legacy ==
Crompton was in partnership with his Blackburn Rovers teammate, the Welsh international centre-forward William Davies, as motor engineers.

It was announced on 25 February 2015 via Twitter that Bob Crompton would be inducted to the Hall of Fame by the National Football Museum as a 'Historic Player'.

Crompton became the first player (and manager) to be entered into the Blackburn Rovers Football Club Hall of Fame on 8 February 2019.

== Honours ==
=== As a player ===
Blackburn Rovers

- First Division: 1911–12, 1913–14

=== As a manager ===
Blackburn Rovers

- FA Cup: 1928
- Second Division: 1938–39
- Football League War Cup runner-up: 1939–40
