= Geoff Coleman (footballer) =

English footballer (born 1936)

Personal information
- Full name: Geoffrey James Coleman
- Date of birth: 13 May 1936 (age 90)
- Place of birth: Bedworth, England
- Position: Right back

Senior career*
Years	Team	Apps	(Gls)
- Bedworth Town
1955	Northampton Town	18	(0)
- Lockheed Leamington
- Nuneaton Borough

Managerial career
- Redditch
- 1969–1973: Lockheed Leamington
- 1973: Nuneaton Borough (reserves)
- 1973–1976: Nuneaton Borough
- 1976–1977: Wealdstone
- * Club domestic league appearances and goals

Geoffrey James Coleman (born 13 May 1936) is an English former professional footballer who played as a right back in the Football League for Northampton Town. He later managed non-League clubs Redditch, Lockheed Leamington, Nuneaton Borough and Wealdstone.
