= Henry Healless =

English footballer

Personal information
- Date of birth: 10 February 1893
- Place of birth: Blackburn, England
- Date of death: 11 January 1972 (aged 78)
- Height: 5 ft 9 in (1.75 m)
- Position: Centre half

Senior career*
Years	Team	Apps	(Gls)
1919–1932	Blackburn Rovers	360	

International career
1924–1928	England	2	(0)
- * Club domestic league appearances and goals

Henry Healless (10 February 1893 – 11 January 1972) was an English international footballer who played as a centre half.

== Career ==
Born in Blackburn, Healless played professionally for Blackburn Rovers, and earned two caps for England between 1924 and 1928. Healless won the 1928 FA Cup Final with Blackburn.

== Honours ==
Blackburn Rovers

- FA Cup: 1927–28
