= Peter Gordon (English footballer) =

English footballer

Personal information
- Full name: Peter John Gordon
- Date of birth: 21 May 1932
- Place of birth: Northampton, England
- Date of death: 22 May 1990 (aged 58)
- Place of death: Ipswich, Suffolk, England
- Positions: Outside forward; inside forward

Senior career*
Years	Team	Apps	(Gls)
- Northampton Amateurs
1949–1958	Norwich City	160	(34)
1958–1960	Watford	43	(13)
1960–1962	Exeter City	67	(11)
1962–1963	Newport County	8	(1)
- Poole Town
- * Club domestic league appearances and goals

Peter John Gordon was an English association footballer. He played as both outside forward and inside forward in the Football League for Norwich City, Watford, Exeter City and Newport County. After retiring as a player, he coached at several Football League clubs.

== Career ==
Born in Northampton, Gordon started his career at Northampton amateurs, before turning professional with Norwich City in December 1949. He spent much of his career at Norwich, who at the time were competing in the Football League Third Division South. After 160 league appearances and 34 goals, Gordon joined Watford for the start of the 1958–59 season.

After failing to score in his first 11 Watford starts, Gordon's goalscoring rate improved, to the extent that he finished the 1958–59 season as the club's joint-top scorer with 13 goals. However, his place in the Watford first-team was taken by new arrival Dennis Uphill for the 1959–60 season; Gordon made only 5 appearances as Watford secured promotion from the Fourth Division.

In search of first-team football, Gordon left Watford to join Exeter City. Over the following two seasons he made 67 appearances and scored 11 goals, before finishing his career at Newport County and Poole Town. After retirement, Gordon had brief coaching spells at Hartlepool United, Southend United and Northampton Town. He moved away from professional football in 1975 and eventually settled his family home in Barham, near Ipswich, Suffolk. He died in Ipswich Hospital, the day after his 58th birthday.
