= Arthur Rigby (footballer) =

English footballer (1900–1960)

Personal information
- Date of birth: 7 June 1900
- Place of birth: Chorlton-cum-Hardy, Manchester, England
- Date of death: March 1960 (aged 59)
- Place of death: Crewe, England
- Height: 5 ft 8 1/2 in (1.74 m)
- Positions: Inside left; outside left

Senior career*
Years	Team	Apps	(Gls)
????–1921	Crewe Alexandra		
1921–1925	Bradford City	121	(21)
1925–1929	Blackburn Rovers	156	(41)
1929–1932	Everton	42	(11)
1932–1933	Middlesbrough	10	(3)
1933–1935	Clapton Orient	70	(18)
1935–1937	Crewe Alexandra	69	(13)
Total		468+	(107+)

International career
1927	England	5	(3)
1928	Football League XI	1	(0)
- * Club domestic league appearances and goals

Arthur Rigby (7 June 1900 – March 1960) was an English professional footballer who played as inside left or outside left. He won an FA Cup winner's medal with Blackburn Rovers and five caps for England.

== Club career ==
Arthur Rigby was an electrician by trade who initially started his football career as a goalkeeper until after a trial with Stockport County, signed as a winger for Crewe Alexandra after the First World War. In March 1921 he signed for Bradford City for £1,200 when City director Allan Welch took time away from business in Crewe to take him from non-league football to Division One. He played 13 games, scoring one goal, in his first season at City, before the club was relegated in his first full season.

He scored five goals in the club's first season in Division Two during the 1922–23 season finishing as the club's joint top goal-scorer. He remained at City for another two seasons, finishing with 21 goals from 121 league appearances, before he returned to the top flight when Blackburn Rovers paid £2,500 for his services.

His form at Ewood Park was rewarded with an international call-up for the England team and an FA Cup winner's medal in 1928 when Rovers defeated Huddersfield Town 3–1. After 156 league appearances and 41 goals, he left Rovers to sign for Everton in November 1929.

He won a Second Division championship medal with Everton in 1930–31 before moving to Middlesbrough in May 1932. He later played for Clapton Orient and finished his career back at Crewe, where he died in March 1960, aged 59.

== International career ==
Rigby won his first England international cap in a British Home Championship game with Scotland on 2 April 1927; England won 2–1. He scored two goals in his second game against Belgium a month later in a convincing 9–1 victory. In total he won five caps, scoring one more goal, all in 1927.

== Career statistics ==
Scores and results list England's goal tally first, score column indicates score after each Rigby goal.

List of international goals scored by Arthur Rigby
No.	Date	Venue	Opponent	Score	Result	Competition
1	11 May 1927	Oscar Bossaert Stadion, Brussels, Belgium	Belgium		9–1	Friendly
2	11 May 1927	Oscar Bossaert Stadion, Brussels, Belgium	Belgium		9–1	Friendly
3	26 May 1927	Colombes, Paris, France	France		6–0	Friendly

== Honours ==
Blackburn Rovers

- FA Cup: 1927–28

Everton

- Football League Second Division: 1930–31
