= 1935–36 Southern Football League =

The 1935–36 season was the 38th in the history of the Southern League. The league consisted of Eastern and Western Divisions. Margate won the Eastern Division whilst Plymouth Argyle reserves won the Western Division. Margate were declared Southern League champions after winning a championship play-off 3–1.

Three Southern League clubs applied to join the Football League, but none were successful. After four clubs left at the end of the season, the league was restructured into a single division for the 1936–37 season.

== Eastern Division ==
Southern Football League Eastern Division
- Season: 1935–36
- Champions: Margate (1st title)
- Promoted: none
- Relegated: Clapton Orient II (resigned); Millwall II (resigned); Bournemouth & Boscombe Athletic II (resigned)
- Matches: 90
- Goals: 369 (4.1 per match)

There were no new clubs in the Eastern Division this season.

Pos	Team	Pld	W	D	L	GF	GA	GR	Pts	Result
1	Margate	18	13	2	3	49	16	3.063	28	
2	Folkestone	18	11	3	4	46	23	2.000	25	
3	Dartford	18	9	3	6	47	25	1.880	21	
4	Tunbridge Wells Rangers	18	9	1	8	26	41	0.634	19	
5	Clapton Orient II	18	7	4	7	39	31	1.258	18	Left league at end of season
6	Millwall II	18	7	3	8	42	39	1.077	17	Left league at end of season
7	Norwich City II	18	8	0	10	39	38	1.026	16	
8	Guildford City	18	6	3	9	32	52	0.615	15	
9	Aldershot II	18	6	1	11	24	45	0.533	13	
10	Bournemouth & Boscombe Athletic II	18	3	2	13	25	59	0.424	8	Left league at end of season

Rules for classification: The system of using goal average to separate two teams tied on points was used up until the 1976-77 season. The points system: 2 points for a win, 1 point for a draw and 0 points for losing.

== Western Division ==
Southern Football League Western Division
- Season: 1935–36
- Champions: Plymouth Argyle II
- Promoted: none
- Relegated: Bristol Rovers II (resigned)
- Matches: 72
- Goals: 274 (3.81 per match)

A total of nine teams contest the division, including eight from previous season and one new team, Cheltenham Town.

Pos	Team	Pld	W	D	L	GF	GA	GR	Pts	Result
1	Plymouth Argyle II	16	12	3	1	51	18	2.833	27	
2	Bristol Rovers II	16	8	3	5	35	30	1.167	19	Left league at end of season
3	Newport County II	16	8	3	5	29	30	0.967	19	
4	Torquay United II	16	7	1	8	25	28	0.893	15	
5	Bath City	16	5	5	6	18	26	0.692	15	
6	Cheltenham Town	16	6	2	8	32	28	1.143	14	
7	Yeovil & Petters United	16	5	3	8	31	35	0.886	13	
8	Barry	16	5	2	9	29	41	0.707	12	
9	Exeter City II	16	4	2	10	24	38	0.632	10	

Rules for classification: The system of using goal average to separate two teams tied on points was used up until the 1976-77 season. The points system: 2 points for a win, 1 point for a draw and 0 points for losing.

== Football League election ==
Bath City, Dartford and Folkestone applied for election to Division Three South of the Football League. However, both League clubs were re-elected.

Club	League	Votes
Exeter City	Football League	48
Newport County	Football League	40
Bath City	Southern League	9
Dartford	Southern League	1
Folkestone	Southern League	0
