= Reg Elvy =

English footballer (1920–1991)

Personal information
- Full name: Reginald Elvy
- Date of birth: 25 November 1920
- Place of birth: Leeds, England
- Date of death: 13 July 1991 (aged 70)
- Place of death: Kingsthorpe, England
- Position: Goalkeeper

Senior career*
Years	Team	Apps	(Gls)
1944–1947	Halifax Town	22	(0)
1947–1951	Bolton Wanderers	31	(0)
1951–1956	Blackburn Rovers	192	(0)
1956–1959	Northampton Town	67	(0)
Total		312	(0)
- * Club domestic league appearances and goals

Reginald Elvy (25 November 1920 – 13 July 1991) was an English professional footballer who played as a goalkeeper. He played in the Football League for Halifax Town, Bolton Wanderers, Blackburn Rovers and Northampton Town.

== Career ==
Born in Leeds, Elvy joined Halifax Town in 1944 and had made 22 league appearances by the time he signed for Bolton Wanderers in 1947. He was largely second choice to Stan Hanson whilst at Bolton and played in 31 league matches before signing for Blackburn Rovers in November 1951 as cover for the injured Jack Patterson. Despite this, he managed to retain his place in the Blackburn team following Patterson's return, making 152 consecutive appearances between November 1951 and April 1955. He was released at the end of the 1955–56 season.

He joined Northampton Town in summer 1956 and made 67 appearances before retiring.

== Personal life ==
Elvy married his wife Nellie near Leeds in 1941. Following the end of his playing career, Elvy worked with Mitchells & Butlers Brewery in the Northampton area. He died in Kingsthorpe near Northampton on 13 July 1991.
