= Alfred Robinson (footballer, born 1888) =

English footballer

Personal information
- Full name: Alfred Robinson
- Date of birth: 1888
- Place of birth: Manchester, England
- Height: 5 ft 9 in (1.75 m)
- Position: Goalkeeper

Senior career*
Years	Team	Apps	(Gls)
- Chapel-en-le-Frith
1908–1911	Gainsborough Trinity	54	(0)
1911–1921	Blackburn Rovers	144	(0)
- Darwen
Total		198	(0)
- * Club domestic league appearances and goals

Alfred Robinson (born 1888; date of death unknown) was an English professional footballer who was born in Manchester and played as a goalkeeper in the Football League for Gainsborough Trinity and Blackburn Rovers, and in non-League football for Chapel-en-le-Frith and Darwen.

Robinson, noted for his "daring and agility", began the 1911–1912 season as Blackburn Rovers' first choice goalkeeper for the team that won the 1911–12 Football League and the team that won again in 1913–14. His football career was interrupted by service in World War I after which he returned to Blackburn. He left the club for Darwen in 1923.
