= Bob Pryde =

Scottish footballer

Personal information
- Full name: Robert Ireland Pryde
- Date of birth: 25 April 1913
- Place of birth: Methil, Fife, Scotland
- Date of death: 30 June 1998 (aged 85)
- Place of death: Blackpool, England
- Height: 6 ft 0 in (1.83 m)
- Position: Centre half

Senior career*
Years	Team	Apps	(Gls)
1929–1930	East Fife		
1930–1932	St Johnstone	28	(0)
1933–1949	Blackburn Rovers	320	(11)
1949–1950	Wigan Athletic	22	(2)

Managerial career
- 1949–1952: Wigan Athletic
- * Club domestic league appearances and goals

Robert Ireland Pryde (25 April 1913 – 30 June 1998) was a Scottish footballer, who played for East Fife, St Johnstone and Blackburn Rovers. He also appeared as a guest player for West Ham United later in World War II.

In the summer of 1949, he joined Wigan Athletic as a player-manager. During the 1949–50 season, he played 22 games and scored two goals in the Lancashire Combination as the club finished as the league's runners-up. He decided to end his playing career before the start of the following season, and went on to win the league title as manager. He left the club in January 1952.

== Honours ==
As manager

- Lancashire Combination: 1950–51
