= Walter Crook =

English footballer and manager

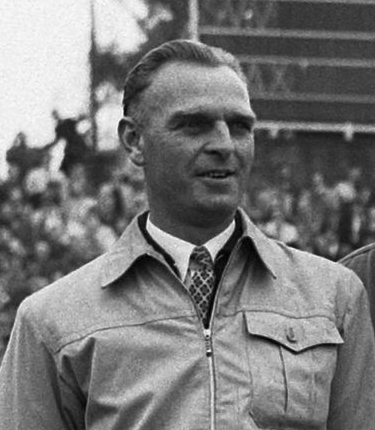

Personal information
- Full name: Walter Crook
- Date of birth: 28 April 1913
- Place of birth: Whittle-le-Woods, Chorley, England
- Date of death: 27 December 1988 (aged 76)
- Place of death: Mellor, England
- Position: Full back

Senior career*
Years	Team	Apps	(Gls)
1931–1947	Blackburn Rovers	236	(2)
1947–1948	Bolton Wanderers	28	(0)
Total		264	(2)

International career
1939	England (wartime)	1	(0)

Managerial career
- 1948–1950: Ajax
- 1950: Sparta Rotterdam
- 1950–1953: Accrington Stanley
- 1953–1954: Ajax
- 1954–1955: Wigan Athletic
- * Club domestic league appearances and goals

Walter Crook (28 April 1913 – 27 December 1988) was an English football player and manager.

== Career ==
=== Playing career ===
Crook, who played as a full back, played in the Football League for Blackburn Rovers and Bolton Wanderers, making a total of 264 appearances. He holds the record for most consecutive Football League appearances by a Blackburn player (208 between 1934 and 1946).

Crook also made one wartime international appearance for England in 1939.

=== Coaching career ===
Crook managed Dutch side Ajax between 1948 and 1950, and again between 1953 and 1954. He also managed Sparta Rotterdam and English club sides Accrington Stanley and Wigan Athletic.

== Personal life ==
Walter was born in Whittle-le-Woods, the son of Jane Parker and Alfred Crook. He was married to Doris Sutcliffe.
