= Sam Small =

English footballer (1912–1993)

Personal information
- Full name: Samuel John Small
- Date of birth: 15 May 1912
- Place of birth: Birmingham, England
- Date of death: 19 December 1993 (aged 81)
- Place of death: Birmingham, England
- Height: 5 ft 10 in (1.78 m)
- Position: Centre forward

Senior career*
Years	Team	Apps	(Gls)
- Bromsgrove Rovers
1934–1937	Birmingham	6	(0)
1937–1948	West Ham United	108	(39)
1948–1950	Brighton & Hove Albion	38	(0)
- * Club domestic league appearances and goals

Samuel John Small (15 May 1912 – 19 December 1993) was an English footballer who played as a centre-forward in the Football League for Birmingham, West Ham United and Brighton & Hove Albion.

Born in Gosta Green, Birmingham, Small started his career at Bromsgrove Rovers. He made six league appearances for Birmingham before signing for West Ham United in 1937. He scored the only goal in the Football League War Cup final against Blackburn Rovers in 1940.

After 116 league and cup appearances and 41 goals for the east London club, Small transferred to Brighton & Hove Albion in March 1948 and made 38 league appearances without return.

He died in Birmingham aged 81.
