= George Foreman (footballer) =

English footballer

Personal information
- Full name: Alexander George Foreman
- Date of birth: 1 March 1914
- Place of birth: Walthamstow, England
- Date of death: 19 June 1969 (aged 55)
- Position: Centre forward

Senior career*
Years	Team	Apps	(Gls)
?–1938	Walthamstow Avenue		
1938	West Ham United	6	(1)
1946	Tottenham Hotspur	36	(14)
- * Club domestic league appearances and goals

Alexander George Foreman (1 March 1914 – 19 June 1969) was an English professional football player who played for Walthamstow Avenue, West Ham United, Tottenham Hotspur and represented the England amateur national football team on one occasion.

== Playing career ==
Foreman played for amateur side Walthamstow Avenue before joining West Ham United in March, 1938.

The centre forward featured in six matches and scored one goal for the 'Hammers'. After the outbreak of the Second World War he played many war times matches for West Ham, and turned out several times for Tottenham Hotspur.

He signed for the White Hart Lane club in March, 1946 and went on to appear in 36 matches and netting 14 goals. In the old Second Division Foreman scored on his debut in a 2–1 defeat versus Birmingham City at White Hart Lane in August 1946.
