= Peter Holland (footballer) =

English footballer

Personal information
- Full name: Peter Byrom Holland
- Date of birth: 5 October 1898
- Place of birth: Hindley, England
- Date of death: 1963 (aged 64–65)
- Position: Inside forward

Senior career*
Years	Team	Apps	(Gls)
1914–1915	New Herrington Swifts		
1915–1916	Houghton Rovers		
1916–1919	Hull City		
1919–1928	Blackburn Rovers	116	(24)
1928–1931	Watford	21	(3)
1930–1931	West Ham United	0	(0)
1931	Tunbridge Wells Rangers		
Total		137	(27)
- * Club domestic league appearances and goals

Peter Byrom Holland (5 October 1898 – 1963) was an English footballer who played in the Football League for Blackburn Rovers and Watford.
