= 1927–28 FA Cup =

Tournament details
- Country: England; Wales

Final positions
- Champions: Blackburn Rovers (6th title)
- Runners-up: Huddersfield Town

The 1927–28 FA Cup was the 53rd staging of the world's oldest football cup competition, the Football Association Challenge Cup, commonly known as the FA Cup. Blackburn Rovers won the competition for the sixth and (as of 2024) final time, beating Huddersfield Town 3–1 in the final at Wembley.

Matches were scheduled to be played at the stadium of the team named first on the date specified for each round, which was always a Saturday. Some matches, however, might be rescheduled for other days if there were clashes with games for other competitions or the weather was inclement. If scores were level after 90 minutes had been played, a replay would take place at the stadium of the second-named team later the same week. If the replayed match was drawn further replays would be held until a winner was determined. If scores were level after 90 minutes had been played in a replay, a 30-minute period of extra time would be played.

== Calendar ==
Round	Date
Extra preliminary round	Saturday 3 September 1927
Preliminary round	Saturday 17 September 1927
First round qualifying	Saturday 1 October 1927
Second round qualifying	Saturday 15 October 1927
Third round qualifying	Saturday 29 October 1927
Fourth round qualifying	Saturday 12 November 1927
First round proper	Saturday 26 November 1927
Second round proper	Saturday 10 December 1927
Third round proper	Saturday 14 January 1928
Fourth round proper	Saturday 28 January 1928
Fifth round proper	Saturday 18 February 1928
Sixth round proper	Saturday 3 March 1928
Semi-finals	Saturday 24 March 1928
Final	Saturday 21 April 1928

== Qualifying rounds ==
Most participating clubs that were not members of the Football League entered the competition in the qualifying rounds. For this tournament, they were joined by Football League Third Division North side Barrow, who were entered in the fourth qualifying round after the FA reduced the size of the first round proper from 38 matches to 34.

The fourth qualifying round remained unchanged at 25 matches, and this season's winners were Stockton, Spennymoor United, Crook Town, Shildon, Workington (who defeated Barrow 3-1 at Lonsdale Park to gain their place in the main draw), Carlisle United, Rhyl, Oswestry Town, Denaby United, Gainsborough Trinity, Shirebrook, Peterborough & Fletton United, Wellington Town, Kettering Town, Southall, Botwell Mission, Clapton, Dartford, Ilford, Chatham, Dulwich Hamlet, London Caledonians, Aldershot, Poole and Bath City.

Those featuring at this stage for the first time were Spennymoor United, Denaby United, Shirebrook, Peterborough & Fletton United, Botwell Mission (who would change their name to Hayes midway through the following season), Dartford and Aldershot, while Oswestry Town had not appeared in the main competition since 1887-88.

Bath City also became the first club in the competition's history to progress from the extra preliminary round to the second round proper (although Hednesford Town and Thornycrofts (Woolston) had played more matches in reaching the first round proper in 1919-20). Bath defeated Melksham, Spencer Moulton, the team from the 5th Royal Tank Regiment, Swindon Corinthians, Welton Rovers, Lovell's Athletic and Southall before going out to London Caledonians. Spennymoor United progressed from the extra preliminary round to the main draw as well, but lost to Rotherham United in the first round proper.

== First round proper ==
At this stage 40 clubs from the Football League Third Division North and South joined the 25 non-league clubs who came through the qualifying rounds. Millwall and Brentford were given byes to the third round while Torquay United did not enter the competition this season. To make the number of matches up, non-league sides Northfleet United, Aberdare Athletic and Leyton were given byes to this round, with Leyton having won the previous season's FA Amateur Cup and Aberdare Athletic having only recently been voted out of the Football League (in favour of Torquay).

34 matches were scheduled to be played on Saturday, 26 November 1927. Six matches were drawn and went to replays in the following midweek fixture.

Tie no	Home team	Score	Away team	Date
1	Darlington	4–1	Chesterfield	26 November 1927
2	Dartford	1–3	Crystal Palace	26 November 1927
3	Bath City	2–0	Southall	26 November 1927
4	Nelson	0–3	Bradford Park Avenue	26 November 1927
5	Rochdale	8–2	Crook Town	26 November 1927
6	Watford	1–2	Brighton & Hove Albion	30 November 1927
7	Gillingham	2–1	Plymouth Argyle	26 November 1927
8	Crewe Alexandra	2–2	Ashington	26 November 1927
Replay	Ashington	0–2	Crewe Alexandra	30 November 1927
9	Luton Town	9–0	Clapton	30 November 1927
10	Gainsborough Trinity	6–0	Stockton	26 November 1927
11	Ilford	4–0	Dulwich Hamlet	26 November 1927
12	Poole	1–1	Norwich City	26 November 1927
Replay	Norwich City	5–0	Poole	1 December 1927
13	Stockport County	5–2	Oswestry Town	26 November 1927
14	Accrington Stanley	2–5	Lincoln City	26 November 1927
15	Bristol Rovers	4–2	Walsall	26 November 1927
16	Northampton Town	8–0	Leyton	26 November 1927
17	Coventry City	2–2	Bournemouth & Boscombe Athletic	26 November 1927
Replay	Bournemouth & Boscombe Athletic	2–0	Coventry City	30 November 1927
18	Denaby United	2–3	Southport	26 November 1927
19	Shildon	1–3	New Brighton	26 November 1927
20	Northfleet United	0–1	London Caledonians	26 November 1927
21	Bradford City	6–0	Workington	26 November 1927
22	Carlisle United	2–1	Doncaster Rovers	26 November 1927
23	Spennymoor United	1–1	Rotherham United	26 November 1927
Replay	Rotherham United	4–2	Spennymoor United	1 December 1927
24	Southend United	1–0	Wellington Town	26 November 1927
25	Exeter City	9–1	Aberdare Athletic	26 November 1927
26	Merthyr Town	0–0	Charlton Athletic	26 November 1927
Replay	Charlton Athletic	2–1	Merthyr Town	30 November 1927
27	Halifax Town	3–0	Hartlepools United	26 November 1927
28	Shirebrook	1–3	Tranmere Rovers	26 November 1927
29	Newport County	0–1	Swindon Town	26 November 1927
30	Durham City	1–1	Wrexham	26 November 1927
Replay	Wrexham	4–0	Durham City	30 November 1927
31	Botwell Mission	3–4	Peterborough & Fletton United	30 November 1927
32	Rhyl	4–3	Wigan Borough	26 November 1927
33	Kettering Town	2–0	Chatham	26 November 1927
34	Aldershot	2–1	Queens Park Rangers	30 November 1927

== Second round proper ==
The matches were played on Saturday, 10 December 1927. Two matches were drawn, with replays taking place in the following midweek fixture.

Tie no	Home team	Score	Away team	Date
1	Darlington	2–1	Rochdale	10 December 1927
2	Bournemouth & Boscombe Athletic	6–1	Bristol Rovers	10 December 1927
3	Gillingham	2–0	Southend United	10 December 1927
4	Crewe Alexandra	2–0	Stockport County	10 December 1927
5	Luton Town	6–0	Norwich City	10 December 1927
6	Gainsborough Trinity	0–2	Lincoln City	10 December 1927
7	London Caledonians	1–0	Bath City	10 December 1927
8	Swindon Town	0–0	Crystal Palace	10 December 1927
Replay	Crystal Palace	1–2	Swindon Town	14 December 1927
9	Wrexham	1–0	Carlisle United	10 December 1927
10	Tranmere Rovers	3–1	Halifax Town	10 December 1927
11	Northampton Town	1–0	Brighton & Hove Albion	10 December 1927
12	Bradford City	2–3	Rotherham United	10 December 1927
13	Bradford Park Avenue	0–2	Southport	10 December 1927
14	Exeter City	5–3	Ilford	10 December 1927
15	Charlton Athletic	1–1	Kettering Town	10 December 1927
Replay	Kettering Town	1–2	Charlton Athletic	15 December 1927
16	New Brighton	7–2	Rhyl	10 December 1927
17	Peterborough & Fletton United	2–1	Aldershot	10 December 1927

== Third round proper ==
The 44 First and Second Division clubs, entered the competition at this stage, along with Third Division Millwall and Brentford and amateur side Corinthian. London Caledonians and Peterborough & Fletton United were the last qualifying clubs remaining in the draw.

The matches were scheduled for Saturday, 14 January 1928. Three matches were drawn and went to replays in the following midweek fixture.

Tie no	Home team	Score	Away team	Date
1	Birmingham	4–3	Peterborough & Fletton United	14 January 1928
2	Blackpool	1–4	Oldham Athletic	14 January 1928
3	Bristol City	1–2	Tottenham Hotspur	14 January 1928
4	Burnley	0–2	Aston Villa	14 January 1928
5	Liverpool	1–0	Darlington	14 January 1928
6	Preston North End	0–3	Everton	14 January 1928
7	Reading	4–0	Grimsby Town	14 January 1928
8	Notts County	2–3	Sheffield United	14 January 1928
9	Nottingham Forest	1–0	Tranmere Rovers	14 January 1928
10	Blackburn Rovers	4–1	Newcastle United	14 January 1928
11	The Wednesday	3–0	Bournemouth & Boscombe Athletic	14 January 1928
12	Bolton Wanderers	2–1	Luton Town	14 January 1928
13	Wolverhampton Wanderers	2–1	Chelsea	14 January 1928
14	Middlesbrough	3–0	South Shields	14 January 1928
15	Sunderland	3–3	Northampton Town	14 January 1928
Replay	Northampton Town	0–3	Sunderland	19 January 1928
16	London Caledonians	2–3	Crewe Alexandra	14 January 1928
17	Swindon Town	2–1	Clapton Orient	14 January 1928
18	Wrexham	2–1	Swansea Town	14 January 1928
19	Manchester City	1–0	Leeds United	14 January 1928
20	Portsmouth	0–2	West Ham United	14 January 1928
21	Manchester United	7–1	Brentford	14 January 1928
22	Millwall	1–2	Derby County	14 January 1928
23	Hull City	0–1	Leicester City	14 January 1928
24	Huddersfield Town	4–2	Lincoln City	14 January 1928
25	Cardiff City	2–1	Southampton	14 January 1928
26	Port Vale	3–0	Barnsley	14 January 1928
27	Charlton Athletic	1–1	Bury	14 January 1928
Replay	Bury	4–3	Charlton Athletic	18 January 1928
28	Arsenal	2–0	West Bromwich Albion	14 January 1928
29	Southport	3–0	Fulham	14 January 1928
30	New Brighton	2–1	Corinthian	14 January 1928
31	Stoke City	6–1	Gillingham	14 January 1928
32	Rotherham United	3–3	Exeter City	14 January 1928
Replay	Exeter City	3–1	Rotherham United	18 January 1928

== Fourth round proper ==
The matches were scheduled for Saturday, 28 January 1928. Three games were drawn and went to replays in the following midweek fixture.

Tie no	Home team	Score	Away team	Date
1	Bury	1–1	Manchester United	28 January 1928
Replay	Manchester United	1–0	Bury	1 February 1928
2	Reading	0–1	Leicester City	28 January 1928
3	Aston Villa	3–0	Crewe Alexandra	28 January 1928
4	Sunderland	1–2	Manchester City	28 January 1928
5	Derby County	0–0	Nottingham Forest	28 January 1928
Replay	Nottingham Forest	2–0	Derby County	1 February 1928
6	Swindon Town	1–2	The Wednesday	28 January 1928
7	Wrexham	1–3	Birmingham	28 January 1928
8	Sheffield United	3–1	Wolverhampton Wanderers	28 January 1928
9	Tottenham Hotspur	3–0	Oldham Athletic	28 January 1928
10	Exeter City	2–2	Blackburn Rovers	28 January 1928
Replay	Blackburn Rovers	3–1	Exeter City	2 February 1928
11	Huddersfield Town	2–1	West Ham United	28 January 1928
12	Cardiff City	2–1	Liverpool	28 January 1928
13	Port Vale	3–0	New Brighton	28 January 1928
14	Arsenal	4–3	Everton	28 January 1928
15	Southport	0–3	Middlesbrough	28 January 1928
16	Stoke City	4–2	Bolton Wanderers	28 January 1928

== Fifth round proper ==
The matches were scheduled for Saturday, 18 February 1928. There was one replay, played in the next midweek fixture.

Tie no	Home team	Score	Away team	Date
1	Leicester City	0–3	Tottenham Hotspur	18 February 1928
2	Nottingham Forest	2–1	Cardiff City	18 February 1928
3	Blackburn Rovers	2–1	Port Vale	18 February 1928
4	The Wednesday	1–1	Sheffield United	18 February 1928
Replay	Sheffield United	4–1	The Wednesday	22 February 1928
5	Manchester City	0–1	Stoke City	18 February 1928
6	Manchester United	1–0	Birmingham	18 February 1928
7	Huddersfield Town	4–0	Middlesbrough	18 February 1928
8	Arsenal	4–1	Aston Villa	18 February 1928

== Sixth round proper ==
The four quarter-final ties were scheduled to be played on Saturday, 3 March 1928. There were no replays.

Tie no	Home team	Score	Away team	Date
1	Blackburn Rovers	2–0	Manchester United	3 March 1928
2	Sheffield United	3–0	Nottingham Forest	3 March 1928
3	Huddersfield Town	6–1	Tottenham Hotspur	3 March 1928
4	Arsenal	4–1	Stoke City	3 March 1928

== Semi-finals ==
The semi-final matches were played on Saturday, 24 March 1928. The Huddersfield Town–Sheffield United local derby tie went to two replays before it was settled in Huddersfield's favour. Huddersfield went on to meet Blackburn Rovers in the final at Wembley.

24 March 1928
15:00

Blackburn Rovers	1–0	Arsenal

Filbert Street, Leicester

24 March 1928
15:00

Huddersfield Town	2–2	Sheffield United

Old Trafford, Manchester

Replay

26 March 1928
19:45

Huddersfield Town	0–0	Sheffield United

Goodison Park, Liverpool

Replay

2 April 1928
19:45

Huddersfield Town	1–0	Sheffield United

Maine Road, Manchester

== Final ==
The 1928 FA Cup Final was contested by Blackburn Rovers and Huddersfield Town at Wembley. Blackburn won 3–1, with goals from Jack Roscamp (2) and Tommy McLean. Alex Jackson scored Huddersfield's goal, making this the first final in 18 years where both teams scored.

=== Match details ===
21 April 1928
15:00 BST

Blackburn Rovers	3–1	Huddersfield Town
Roscamp 1' 82'; McLean 22'	(Report)	Jackson 55'

Wembley, London
Attendance: 92,041
Referee: T. G. Bryan

Blackburn Rovers	Huddersfield Town

== See also ==
- FA Cup Final Results 1872-
