= 1937–38 Huddersfield Town A.F.C. season =

1937–38 season of Huddersfield Town

Huddersfield Town
1937–38 season
- Chairman: Sir Amos Brook Hirst
- Manager: Clem Stephenson
- Stadium: Leeds Road
- Football League First Division: 15th
- FA Cup: Runners-Up (eliminated by Preston North End)
- Top goalscorer: League: Bobby Barclay (12); All: Bobby Barclay (14)
- Highest home attendance: 58,066 vs York City (9 March 1938)
- Lowest home attendance: 6,719 vs Preston North End (16 March 1938)
- Biggest win: 4–0 vs Derby County (18 April 1938)
- Biggest defeat: 0–4 vs Blackpool (1 January 1938); 0–4 vs Charlton Athletic (12 March 1938); 1–5 vs West Bromwich Albion (23 April 1938)

Huddersfield Town's 1937–38 campaign was like many recent years dominated by the club's FA Cup run. They reached their 5th and final FA Cup final, before losing to Preston North End at Wembley. They finished their league season in 15th place in Division 1.

== Squad at the start of the season ==
Note: Flags indicate national team as defined under FIFA eligibility rules; some limited exceptions apply. Players may hold more than one non-FIFA nationality.

Pos.	Nation	Player
GK	ENG	Bob Hesford
GK	RSA	Dennis Lindsay
DF	ENG	Eddie Boot
DF	ENG	Alan Brown
DF	ENG	Benny Craig
DF	ENG	Robert Gordon
DF	EIR	Bill Hayes
DF	ENG	Reg Mountford
DF	ENG	Ken Willingham
DF	ENG	Alf Young
MF	ENG	Bobby Barclay

Pos.	Nation	Player
MF	ENG	Pat Beasley
MF	SCO	Archibald Hastie
MF	ENG	Jack Johnson
MF	RSA	George Wienand
FW	ENG	Lewis Brook
FW	ENG	Frank Chivers
FW	ENG	Jimmy Isaac
FW	ENG	Alf Lythgoe
FW	SCO	Willie Macfadyen
FW	ENG	Jimmy Richardson

== Review ==
Yet again, Town's season was dominated by their FA Cup run. They reached their fifth and so far last FA Cup Final. After a win over Hull City in Round 3, they scraped past Notts County and Liverpool, they beat York City in the quarter-final in a replay, before beating the favourites Sunderland at Ewood Park in the semi-final, meaning they would play Preston North End in the final, a repeat of the 1922 FA Cup Final, the only one of Town's previous final appearances that they won. The final at Wembley was the first since moving to the London stadium to go into extra time. The result would be the opposite to the 1922 final, with Town conceding a penalty to lose the match 1–0.

Their league form was pretty shaky during the season and they only guaranteed their safety with 2 games to go. Their wins at Leeds Road over Stoke City and Manchester City, the previous season's champions guaranteed their survival in 15th place.

== Squad at the end of the season ==
Note: Flags indicate national team as defined under FIFA eligibility rules; some limited exceptions apply. Players may hold more than one non-FIFA nationality.

Pos.	Nation	Player
GK	ENG	Bob Hesford
GK	RSA	Dennis Lindsay
DF	ENG	Eddie Boot
DF	ENG	Alan Brown
DF	ENG	Benny Craig
DF	ENG	Robert Gordon
DF	EIR	Bill Hayes
DF	ENG	Reg Mountford
DF	ENG	Albert Watson
DF	ENG	Ken Willingham
DF	ENG	Alf Young
MF	ENG	Bobby Barclay

Pos.	Nation	Player
MF	ENG	Pat Beasley
MF	ENG	Tom Hinchcliffe
MF	ENG	Joe Hulme
MF	ENG	Jack Johnson
MF	RSA	George Wienand
FW	ENG	Lewis Brook
FW	ENG	Frank Chivers
FW	ENG	Jimmy Isaac
FW	SCO	Willie Macfadyen
FW	SCO	Willie Mills
FW	ENG	Billy Price
FW	SCO	Edwin Watson

== Results ==
=== Division One ===
Date	Opponents	Home/ Away	Result F – A	Scorers	Attendance	Position
28 August 1937	Blackpool	H	3–1	Macfadyen, Barclay, Mountford (pen)	17,768	5th
1 September 1937	Arsenal	A	1–3	Richardson	32,758	10th
4 September 1937	Brentford	A	0–2		26,762	17th
8 September 1937	Arsenal	H	2–1	Macfadyen, Barclay	15,768	13th
11 September 1937	Bolton Wanderers	H	1–0	Wienand	20,758	9th
15 September 1937	Manchester City	A	2–3	Richardson, Beasley	19,968	13th
18 September 1937	Leeds United	A	1–2	Barclay	33,200	18th
25 September 1937	Everton	A	2–1	Barclay, Macfadyen	35,272	14th
2 October 1937	Wolverhampton Wanderers	H	1–0	Hayes (pen)	19,854	10th
9 October 1937	Leicester City	A	1–2	Richardson	18,442	13th
16 October 1937	Grimsby Town	H	1–2	Lythgoe (pen)	15,408	13th
23 October 1937	Preston North End	A	1–1	Barclay	16,483	15th
30 October 1937	Charlton Athletic	H	1–1	Chivers	13,334	14th
6 November 1937	Birmingham	A	2–2	Beasley, Barclay	21,541	13th
13 November 1937	Portsmouth	H	2–0	Lythgoe (pen), Chivers	11,902	12th
20 November 1937	Liverpool	A	1–0	Beasley	29,568	11th
27 November 1937	Middlesbrough	H	3–0	Beasley (2, 1 pen), Macfadyen	14,020	7th
4 December 1937	Chelsea	A	1–3	Wienand	31,475	10th
11 December 1937	West Bromwich Albion	H	2–1	Barclay, Hayes (pen)	6,938	8th
18 December 1937	Stoke City	A	1–0	Macfadyen	16,302	7th
25 December 1937	Sunderland	A	1–2	Young	30,730	7th
27 December 1937	Sunderland	H	1–1	Chivers	13,198	8th
1 January 1938	Blackpool	A	0–4		22,362	8th
15 January 1938	Brentford	H	0–3		11,969	11th
26 January 1938	Bolton Wanderers	A	0–2		9,722	11th
29 January 1938	Leeds United	H	0–3		16,677	12th
5 February 1938	Everton	H	1–3	Brook	15,394	16th
16 February 1938	Wolverhampton Wanderers	A	4–1	Boot, Wienand, Macfadyen, Hinchcliffe	16,044	13th
19 February 1938	Leicester City	H	0–0		14,999	13th
26 February 1938	Grimsby Town	A	2–4	Barclay, Macfadyen	12,085	14th
12 March 1938	Charlton Athletic	A	0–4		26,938	20th
16 March 1938	Preston North End	H	1–3	Macfadyen	6,719	21st
19 March 1938	Birmingham	H	2–1	Macfadyen, Beasley	15,365	17th
30 March 1938	Portsmouth	A	0–3		18,155	19th
2 April 1938	Liverpool	H	1–2	Macfadyen	15,192	21st
9 April 1938	Middlesbrough	A	1–0	Mills	20,901	21st
16 April 1938	Chelsea	H	1–2	Beasley	18,356	22nd
18 April 1938	Derby County	A	4–0	Isaac (2), Price, Beasley	19,068	21st
19 April 1938	Derby County	H	2–0	Hinchcliffe, Price	25,575	15th
23 April 1938	West Bromwich Albion	A	1–5	Barclay	27,530	19th
2 May 1938	Stoke City	H	3–0	Barclay (2), Price	20,162	16th
7 May 1938	Manchester City	H	1–0	Barclay	35,100	15th

=== FA Cup ===
Date	Round	Opponents	Home/ Away	Result F – A	Scorers	Attendance
8 January 1938	Round 3	Hull City	H	3–1	Beasley, Lythgoe (2)	25,442
22 January 1938	Round 4	Notts County	H	1–0	Beattie	29,480
12 February 1938	Round 5	Liverpool	A	1–0	Barclay	57,682
5 March 1938	Round 6	York City	A	0–0		28,123
9 March 1938	Round 6 Replay	York City	H	2–1	E. Watson, Chivers	58,066
26 March 1938	Semi-Final	Sunderland	N	3–1	Beasley, Barclay, Macfadyen	47,904
30 April 1938	Final	Preston North End	N	0 – 1 (aet: 90 mins: 0 – 0)		93,357

== Appearances and goals ==
Name	Nationality	Position	League		FA Cup		Total	
Name	Nationality	Position	Apps	Goals	Apps	Goals	Apps	Goals
Bobby Barclay	England	MF	37	12	7	2	44	14
Pat Beasley	England	MF	41	8	7	2	48	10
John Beattie	Scotland	MF	3	0	1	1	4	1
Eddie Boot	England	DF	37	1	6	0	43	1
Lewis Brook	England	FW	4	1	0	0	4	1
Alan Brown	England	DF	13	0	2	0	15	0
Frank Chivers	England	FW	18	3	4	1	22	4
Benny Craig	England	DF	25	0	6	0	31	0
Robert Gordon	England	DF	1	0	0	0	1	0
Archibald Hastie	Scotland	MF	4	0	0	0	4	0
Bill Hayes	Ireland	DF	21	2	1	0	22	2
Bob Hesford	England	GK	41	0	7	0	48	0
Tom Hinchcliffe	England	MF	6	2	0	0	6	2
Joe Hulme	England	MF	8	0	2	0	10	0
Jimmy Isaac	England	MF	6	2	1	0	7	2
Jack Johnson	England	MF	5	0	0	0	5	0
Dennis Lindsay	South Africa	GK	1	0	0	0	1	0
Alf Lythgoe	England	FW	5	2	2	2	7	4
Willie MacFadyen	Scotland	FW	32	10	5	1	37	11
Willie Mills	Scotland	MF	4	1	0	0	4	1
Reg Mountford	England	DF	38	1	7	0	45	1
Billy Price	England	FW	4	3	0	0	4	3
Jimmy Richardson	England	FW	10	3	0	0	10	3
Albert Watson	England	DF	1	0	0	0	1	0
Edwin Watson	Scotland	FW	3	0	3	1	6	1
George Wienand	South Africa	MF	24	3	4	0	28	3
Ken Willingham	England	DF	41	0	7	0	48	0
Alf Young	England	DF	29	1	5	0	34	1
