= 1938–39 Huddersfield Town A.F.C. season =

Huddersfield Town
1938–39 season
- Chairman: Sir Amos Brook Hirst
- Manager: Clem Stephenson
- Stadium: Leeds Road
- Football League First Division: 19th
- FA Cup: Semi-finals (eliminated by Portsmouth)
- Top goalscorer: League: Billy Price (17); All: Billy Price (24)
- Highest home attendance: 56,518 vs Blackburn Rovers (4 March 1939)
- Lowest home attendance: 5,442 vs Nottingham Forest (11 January 1939)
- Biggest win: 4–0 vs Charlton Athletic (18 February 1939)
- Biggest defeat: 0–4 vs Portsmouth (10 September 1938); 0–4 vs Aston Villa (15 February 1939)
Home colours

Huddersfield Town's 1938–39 campaign was the last full season of football before the start of World War II. Town would finish 19th in Division 1, but they had another impressive FA Cup run, following from the previous season's runner-up spot, reaching the semi-finals, before losing to Portsmouth.

== Squad at the start of the season ==
Note: Flags indicate national team as defined under FIFA eligibility rules; some limited exceptions apply. Players may hold more than one non-FIFA nationality.

Pos.	Nation	Player
GK	ENG	Bob Hesford
DF	ENG	Eddie Boot
DF	ENG	Alan Brown
DF	ENG	Benny Craig
DF	ENG	Robert Gordon
DF	EIR	Bill Hayes
DF	ENG	Reg Mountford
DF	ENG	Albert Watson
DF	ENG	Ken Willingham
DF	ENG	Alf Young

Pos.	Nation	Player
MF	ENG	Bobby Barclay
MF	ENG	Pat Beasley
MF	ENG	Tom Hinchcliffe
MF	ENG	Jack Johnson
MF	ENG	Robert Perrett
MF	RSA	George Wienand
FW	ENG	Lewis Brook
FW	ENG	Jimmy Isaac
FW	SCO	Willie Mills
FW	ENG	Billy Price

== Review ==
Town continued their downward spiral, which saw Town fighting in a relegation battle for a major part of the season, but luckily most of the season was highlighted by Town's successes in the FA Cup, following their 5th final appearance the previous season. They reached the semi-final against Portsmouth. They lost the match 2–1 at Highbury. This to date, is their last ever FA Cup semi-final appearance. Town's final league placing was 19th just ahead of Chelsea, Birmingham and Leicester City.

== Squad at the end of the season ==
Note: Flags indicate national team as defined under FIFA eligibility rules; some limited exceptions apply. Players may hold more than one non-FIFA nationality.

Pos.	Nation	Player
GK	ENG	Bob Hesford
DF	ENG	Eddie Boot
DF	ENG	Alan Brown
DF	ENG	Robert Gordon
DF	EIR	Bill Hayes
DF	ENG	Reg Mountford
DF	ENG	Albert Watson
DF	ENG	Ken Willingham
DF	ENG	Alf Young
MF	ENG	Bobby Barclay
MF	EIR	Pat Barlow

Pos.	Nation	Player
MF	ENG	Pat Beasley
MF	ENG	Jack Mahon
MF	SCO	Andy McCall
MF	ENG	John Shiel
MF	ENG	Willie Watson
FW	EIR	Harry Baird
FW	ENG	Lewis Brook
FW	ENG	Jimmy Isaac
FW	SCO	Willie Mills
FW	ENG	Billy Price

== Results ==
=== Division One ===
Date	Opponents	Home/ Away	Result F – A	Scorers	Attendance	Position
27 August 1938	Brentford	A	1–2	Price	26,638	14th
31 August 1938	Derby County	A	0–1		13,375	19th
3 September 1938	Arsenal	H	1–1	Mills	26,126	19th
7 September 1938	Derby County	H	3–0	Brook, Hayes (pen), Isaac	11,293	13th
10 September 1938	Portsmouth	A	0–4		26,302	20th
14 September 1938	Sunderland	H	0–1		9,724	20th
17 September 1938	Leeds United	H	0–1		19,793	22nd
24 September 1938	Everton	H	3–0	Hinchcliffe (2), Isaac	27,710	19th
1 October 1938	Wolverhampton Wanderers	A	0–3		21,213	20th
8 October 1938	Aston Villa	H	1–1	Callaghan (og)	20,639	20th
15 October 1938	Charlton Athletic	A	1–2	Price	28,038	21st
22 October 1938	Bolton Wanderers	H	2–1	Baird, Beasley	18,027	20th
29 October 1938	Liverpool	A	3–3	Beasley, Baird, Price	33,734	19th
5 November 1938	Leicester City	H	2–0	Beasley, Barlow	16,102	16th
12 November 1938	Middlesbrough	A	1–4	Price	19,630	19th
19 November 1938	Birmingham	H	3–1	Barclay, Beasley, Baird	14,637	18th
26 November 1938	Manchester United	A	1–1	Price	23,164	15th
3 December 1938	Stoke City	H	1–4	Mills	17,953	18th
10 December 1938	Chelsea	A	0–3		23,257	21st
17 December 1938	Preston North End	H	3–0	Price (2), Beasley	8,916	18th
24 December 1938	Brentford	H	1–2	Baird	11,493	20th
26 December 1938	Blackpool	A	1–1	Price	18,955	19th
27 December 1938	Blackpool	H	3–0	Beasley (2), Brook	27,113	17th
31 December 1938	Arsenal	A	0–1		34,146	19th
14 January 1939	Portsmouth	H	3–0	Price, Beasley, Isaac	9,006	16th
25 January 1939	Leeds United	A	0–1		3,896	Match abandoned after 61 minutes due to snow.
28 January 1939	Everton	A	2–3	Beasley, Price	37,269	18th
4 February 1939	Wolverhampton Wanderers	H	1–2	Hayes (pen)	20,405	18th
15 February 1939	Aston Villa	A	0–4		27,500	20th
18 February 1939	Charlton Athletic	H	4–0	Price, Hayes (pen), Mills, Barclay	16,163	17th
25 February 1939	Bolton Wanderers	A	2–3	Price, Beasley	19,332	18th
11 March 1939	Leicester City	A	1–0	Isaac	13,898	19th
15 March 1939	Liverpool	H	1–1	Price	7,704	19th
18 March 1939	Middlesbrough	H	0–1		16,011	19th
29 March 1939	Birmingham	A	1–1	Barclay	12,000	20th
1 April 1939	Manchester United	H	1–1	Barclay	14,007	19th
7 April 1939	Grimsby Town	A	3–3	Mills, Price (2)	18,835	19th
8 April 1939	Stoke City	A	2–2	Boot, Mountford	26,014	19th
11 April 1939	Grimsby Town	H	2–0	Brook (2)	21,747	19th
15 April 1939	Chelsea	H	3–1	Mills (2), Price	11,731	18th
19 April 1939	Leeds United	A	1–2	Isaac	12,006	18th
22 April 1939	Preston North End	A	0–3		13,093	19th
29 April 1939	Sunderland	A	0–0		7,729	19th

=== FA Cup ===
Date	Round	Opponents	Home/ Away	Result F – A	Scorers	Attendance
11 January 1939	Round 3	Nottingham Forest	H	0–0		5,442
16 January 1939	Round 3 Replay	Nottingham Forest	A	3–0	Isaac (2), Price	22,304
21 January 1939	Round 4	Leeds United	A	4–2	Price (3), Barclay	43,702
11 February 1939	Round 5	Walsall	H	3–0	Price (2), McCall	33,543
4 March 1939	Round 6	Blackburn Rovers	H	1–1	Price	56,518
9 March 1939	Round 6 Replay	Blackburn Rovers	A	2–1	Mahon, Beasley	54,400
25 March 1939	Semi-Final	Portsmouth	N	1–2	Barclay	60,053

== Appearances and goals ==
Name	Nationality	Position	League		FA Cup		Total	
Name	Nationality	Position	Apps	Goals	Apps	Goals	Apps	Goals
Harry Baird	Ireland	FW	19	4	2	0	21	4
Bobby Barclay	England	MF	28	4	6	2	34	6
Pat Barlow	Ireland	MF	7	1	0	0	7	1
Pat Beasley	England	MF	34	9	7	1	41	10
Eddie Boot	England	DF	36	1	5	0	41	1
Lewis Brook	England	FW	8	4	0	0	8	4
Alan Brown	England	DF	15	0	0	0	15	0
Benny Craig	England	DF	1	0	0	0	1	0
Robert Gordon	England	DF	6	0	0	0	6	0
Bill Hayes	Ireland	DF	41	3	7	0	48	3
Bob Hesford	England	GK	42	0	7	0	49	0
Tom Hinchcliffe	England	MF	7	2	0	0	7	2
Jimmy Isaac	England	MF	19	5	6	2	25	7
Jack Johnson	England	MF	5	0	0	0	5	0
Jack Mahon	England	MF	5	0	1	1	6	1
Andy McCall	Scotland	MF	5	0	3	1	8	1
Willie Mills	Scotland	MF	23	6	4	0	27	6
Reg Mountford	England	DF	42	1	7	0	49	1
Robert Perrett	England	MF	1	0	0	0	1	0
Billy Price	England	FW	33	17	7	7	40	24
John Shiel	England	FW	1	0	0	0	1	0
Albert Watson	England	DF	6	0	1	0	7	0
Willie Watson	England	MF	11	0	0	0	11	0
George Wienand	South Africa	MF	4	0	0	0	4	0
Ken Willingham	England	DF	33	0	7	0	40	0
Alf Young	England	DF	30	0	7	0	37	0
