= 1936–37 Huddersfield Town A.F.C. season =

Huddersfield Town
1936–37 season
- Chairman: Sir Amos Brook Hirst
- Manager: Clem Stephenson
- Stadium: Leeds Road
- Division One: 15th
- FA Cup: Third round (eliminated by Brentford)
- Top goalscorer: League: Jimmy Richardson (11); All: Jimmy Richardson (11)
- Highest home attendance: 33,899 vs Preston North End (26 December 1936)
- Lowest home attendance: 4,179 vs West Bromwich Albion (10 March 1937)
- Biggest win: 4–0 vs Liverpool (19 December 1936); 4–0 vs Wolverhampton Wanderers (28 December 1936)
- Biggest defeat: 0–5 vs Brentford (16 January 1937); 0–5 vs Middlesbrough (27 February 1937)
Home colours

Huddersfield Town's 1936–37 campaign was a season that saw Town fight for their league status in Division 1. They finished 15th, a far cry from their third-place finish the previous season.

== Squad at the start of the season ==
Note: Flags indicate national team as defined under FIFA eligibility rules; some limited exceptions apply. Players may hold more than one non-FIFA nationality.

Pos.	Nation	Player
GK	ENG	Bob Hesford
GK	ENG	Hugh Turner
DF	ENG	Albert Beech
DF	ENG	Alan Brown
DF	ENG	Benny Craig
DF	ENG	Roy Goodall
DF	EIR	Bill Hayes
DF	ENG	Reg Mountford
DF	ENG	Jim Spedding
DF	SCO	Jock Wightman
DF	ENG	Ken Willingham

Pos.	Nation	Player
DF	ENG	Alf Young
MF	ENG	Jack Johnson
MF	SCO	Duncan Ogilvie
FW	ENG	Len Butt
FW	ENG	Reg Chester
FW	ENG	Frank Chivers
FW	ENG	Sedley Cooper
FW	ENG	Jimmy Isaac
FW	ENG	Alf Lythgoe
FW	ENG	Jimmy Richardson

== Review ==
Town's 8th season under Clem Stephenson was another season of mediocrity, which had been continued for most of the previous few seasons with the exception of the previous season's 3rd-place finish. With no FA Cup run to fall back on either, Town were down in a relegation dogfight with nearly half the teams in the division, but luckily the records of Manchester United and Sheffield Wednesday were worse enough to see them drop down to Division 2.

== Squad at the end of the season ==
Note: Flags indicate national team as defined under FIFA eligibility rules; some limited exceptions apply. Players may hold more than one non-FIFA nationality.

Pos.	Nation	Player
GK	ENG	Bob Hesford
GK	ENG	Hugh Turner
DF	ENG	Albert Beech
DF	ENG	Eddie Boot
DF	ENG	Alan Brown
DF	ENG	Benny Craig
DF	EIR	Bill Hayes
DF	ENG	Reg Mountford
DF	ENG	Jim Spedding
DF	ENG	Ken Willingham
DF	ENG	Alf Young

Pos.	Nation	Player
MF	ENG	Bobby Barclay
MF	ENG	Pat Beasley
MF	SCO	Archibald Hastie
MF	ENG	Jack Johnson
FW	ENG	Len Butt
FW	ENG	Reginald Chester
FW	ENG	Frank Chivers
FW	ENG	Jimmy Isaac
FW	ENG	Alf Lythgoe
FW	SCO	Willie Macfadyen
FW	ENG	Jimmy Richardson

== Results ==
=== Division One ===
Date	Opponents	Home/ Away	Result F – A	Scorers	Attendance	Position
29 August 1936	Preston North End	A	1–1	Richardson	22,596	9th
2 September 1936	Manchester United	H	3–1	Richardson, Chester, Lythgoe	12,616	3rd
5 September 1936	Arsenal	H	0–0		32,013	2nd
9 September 1936	Manchester United	A	1–3	Cooper	26,839	9th
12 September 1936	Brentford	A	1–1	Lythgoe	25,386	10th
17 September 1936	Sheffield Wednesday	A	2–2	Butt, Chivers	18,085	10th
19 September 1936	Bolton Wanderers	H	2–0	Butt, Ogilvie	15,992	5th
26 September 1936	Everton	A	1–2	Chester	33,581	8th
3 October 1936	Leeds United	H	3–0	Ogilvie (2), Butt	18,654	5th
10 October 1936	Sunderland	H	2–1	Richardson, Chivers	26,531	4th
17 October 1936	Birmingham	A	2–4	Barkas (og), Ogilvie	26,172	4th
24 October 1936	Middlesbrough	H	2–0	Richardson, Lythgoe	20,357	3rd
31 October 1936	West Bromwich Albion	A	1–2	R. Finch (og)	20,605	6th
7 November 1936	Manchester City	H	1–1	Beasley	18,438	6th
14 November 1936	Portsmouth	A	0–1		21,500	10th
21 November 1936	Chelsea	H	4–2	Richardson, Butt, G.F. Barber (og), Lythgoe	12,382	5th
28 November 1936	Stoke City	A	1–1	Beasley	13,644	7th
5 December 1936	Charlton Athletic	H	1–2	Richardson	11,609	10th
12 December 1936	Grimsby Town	A	2–2	Beasley, Johnson	8,580	10th
19 December 1936	Liverpool	H	4–0	Butt, Richardson (2), Macfadyen	14,506	8th
25 December 1936	Wolverhampton Wanderers	A	1–3	Macfadyen	30,616	10th
26 December 1936	Preston North End	H	4–2	Richardson, Beasley (2), Macfadyen	33,899	7th
28 December 1936	Wolverhampton Wanderers	H	4–0	Richardson (2), Chivers (2)	14,007	6th
2 January 1937	Arsenal	A	1–1	Macfadyen	44,224	7th
9 January 1937	Brentford	H	1–1	Mountford (pen)	21,753	8th
23 January 1937	Bolton Wanderers	A	2–2	Johnson, Macfadyen	15,746	7th
3 February 1937	Everton	H	0–3		5,216	10th
6 February 1937	Leeds United	A	1–2	Chivers	28,930	10th
13 February 1937	Sunderland	A	2–3	Isaac, Chivers	23,336	11th
20 February 1937	Birmingham	H	1–1	Hastie	10,334	11th
27 February 1937	Middlesbrough	A	0–5		15,932	13th
10 March 1937	West Bromwich Albion	H	1–1	Beasley	4,179	12th
17 March 1937	Manchester City	A	0–3		28,240	14th
20 March 1937	Portsmouth	H	1–2	Macfadyen	14,685	15th
27 March 1937	Chelsea	A	0–0		31,384	16th
29 March 1937	Derby County	A	3–3	Chivers (2), Macfadyen	30,688	16th
30 March 1937	Derby County	H	2–0	Barclay (2)	20,727	15th
3 April 1937	Stoke City	H	2–1	Beasley, Macfadyen	12,149	14th
10 April 1937	Charlton Athletic	A	0–1		24,995	15th
17 April 1937	Grimsby Town	H	0–3		6,189	16th
24 April 1937	Liverpool	A	1–1	Barclay	17,858	16th
1 May 1937	Sheffield Wednesday	H	1–0	Chivers	5,821	15th

=== FA Cup ===
Date	Round	Opponents	Home/ Away	Result F – A	Scorers	Attendance
16 January 1937	Round 3	Brentford	A	0–5		33,000

== Appearances and goals ==
Name	Nationality	Position	League		FA Cup		Total	
Name	Nationality	Position	Apps	Goals	Apps	Goals	Apps	Goals
Bobby Barclay	England	MF	9	3	0	0	9	3
Pat Beasley	England	MF	33	7	1	0	34	7
Albert Beech	England	DF	3	0	0	0	3	0
Eddie Boot	England	DF	9	0	0	0	9	0
Alan Brown	England	DF	21	0	1	0	22	0
Len Butt	England	FW	25	5	1	0	26	5
Reg Chester	England	FW	8	2	0	0	8	2
Frank Chivers	England	FW	20	9	0	0	20	9
Sedley Cooper	England	FW	5	1	0	0	5	1
Benny Craig	England	DF	18	0	0	0	18	0
Roy Goodall	England	DF	19	0	1	0	20	0
Archibald Hastie	Scotland	MF	9	1	0	0	9	1
Bill Hayes	Ireland	DF	5	0	0	0	5	0
Bob Hesford	England	GK	41	0	1	0	42	0
Jimmy Isaac	England	MF	8	1	0	0	8	1
Jack Johnson	England	MF	8	2	0	0	8	2
Alf Lythgoe	England	FW	10	4	0	0	10	4
Willie MacFadyen	Scotland	FW	16	8	1	0	17	8
Reg Mountford	England	DF	39	1	1	0	40	1
Duncan Ogilvie	Scotland	MF	18	4	0	0	18	4
Jimmy Richardson	England	FW	40	11	1	0	41	11
Jim Spedding	England	DF	4	0	0	0	4	0
Hugh Turner	England	GK	1	0	0	0	1	0
Jock Wightman	Scotland	DF	20	0	1	0	21	0
Ken Willingham	England	DF	38	0	1	0	39	0
Alf Young	England	DF	35	0	1	0	36	0
