= 1935–36 Huddersfield Town A.F.C. season =

Huddersfield Town
1935–36 season
- Chairman: Sir Amos Brook Hirst
- Manager: Clem Stephenson
- Stadium: Leeds Road
- Football League First Division: 3rd
- FA Cup: Fourth round (eliminated by Tottenham Hotspur)
- Top goalscorer: League: Alf Lythgoe (15); All: Alf Lythgoe (15)
- Highest home attendance: 35,816 vs Arsenal (30 November 1935)
- Lowest home attendance: 3,404 vs Everton (29 January 1936)
- Biggest win: 4–1 vs Aston Villa (26 December 1935); 4–1 vs Middlesbrough (19 February 1936)
- Biggest defeat: 0–4 vs Preston North End (28 December 1935)

Huddersfield Town's 1935–36 campaign was a season that saw Town emulate their successes in the mid-1920s, by finishing the season in third place. They achieved the same number of points as second placed Derby County, but finished eight points behind champions Sunderland.

== Squad at the start of the season ==
Source: Note: Flags indicate national team as defined under FIFA eligibility rules; some limited exceptions apply. Players may hold more than one non-FIFA nationality.

Pos.	Nation	Player
GK	ENG	Bob Hesford
GK	ENG	Hugh Turner
DF	ENG	Albert Beech
DF	ENG	Alan Brown
DF	ENG	Buster Brown
DF	ENG	Benny Craig
DF	ENG	Roy Goodall
DF	EIR	Bill Hayes
DF	ENG	Reg Mountford
DF	ENG	George Roughton
DF	SCO	Jock Wightman
DF	ENG	Ken Willingham

Pos.	Nation	Player
DF	ENG	Alf Young
MF	ENG	Len Beaumont
MF	ENG	Jack Johnson
MF	SCO	Tommy Lang
MF	ENG	Charlie Luke
MF	ENG	Ted Widdowfield
MF	WAL	Jackie Williams
MF	ENG	John Yuill
FW	ENG	Len Butt
FW	ENG	Alf Lythgoe
FW	ENG	Jimmy Richardson

== Review ==
Town's form dramatically improved from the disappointing 16th place the previous season. The season did not have many big highlights with the exception of the third-place finish, although their position might have been even higher if Charlie Luke had not been transferred to Sheffield Wednesday and Alf Lythgoe had not had his leg injury which kept him out for the last three months.

== Squad at the end of the season ==
Note: Flags indicate national team as defined under FIFA eligibility rules; some limited exceptions apply. Players may hold more than one non-FIFA nationality.

Pos.	Nation	Player
GK	ENG	Bob Hesford
GK	ENG	Hugh Turner
DF	ENG	Albert Beech
DF	ENG	Alan Brown
DF	ENG	Buster Brown
DF	ENG	Benny Craig
DF	ENG	Roy Goodall
DF	EIR	Bill Hayes
DF	ENG	Reg Mountford
DF	ENG	George Roughton
DF	SCO	Jock Wightman

Pos.	Nation	Player
DF	ENG	Ken Willingham
DF	ENG	Alf Young
MF	ENG	Len Beaumont
MF	ENG	Jack Johnson
MF	SCO	Duncan Ogilvie
MF	ENG	John Yuill
FW	ENG	Len Butt
FW	ENG	Reg Chester
FW	ENG	Frank Chivers
FW	ENG	Alf Lythgoe
FW	ENG	Jimmy Richardson

== Results ==
=== Division One ===
Date	Opponents	Home/ Away	Result F – A	Scorers	Attendance	Position
31 August 1935	Preston North End	H	1–0	Richardson	17,974	1st
2 September 1935	Wolverhampton Wanderers	A	2–2	Lang (2)	20,657	2nd
7 September 1935	Brentford	A	2–1	Butt, Luke	33,481	1st
11 September 1935	Wolverhampton Wanderers	H	3–0	Richardson, Lythgoe (2)	12,105	1st
14 September 1935	Derby County	H	1–1	Richardson	21,209	3rd
16 September 1935	Sheffield Wednesday	A	2–1	Luke, Lythgoe	14,164	1st
21 September 1935	Everton	A	3–1	Richardson (2), Lythgoe	31,043	1st
28 September 1935	Bolton Wanderers	H	0–0		22,564	1st
5 October 1935	Leeds United	A	2–2	Mountford (pen), Lythgoe	33,224	1st
12 October 1935	Middlesbrough	A	2–4	Williams, Mountford (pen)	25,547	1st
19 October 1935	Grimsby Town	H	1–0	Luke	10,687	1st
26 October 1935	Liverpool	A	0–3		32,416	3rd
2 November 1935	Chelsea	H	2–0	Lythgoe (2)	16,684	3rd
9 November 1935	Blackburn Rovers	A	1–2	Lythgoe	16,745	3rd
16 November 1935	Stoke City	H	2–1	Lythgoe (2)	16,905	3rd
23 November 1935	West Bromwich Albion	A	2–1	Lythgoe (2)	24,234	2nd
30 November 1935	Arsenal	H	0–0		35,816	3rd
7 December 1935	Birmingham	A	1–4	Butt	15,000	3rd
14 December 1935	Sunderland	H	1–0	Willingham	30,690	3rd
25 December 1935	Aston Villa	A	1–4	Butt	45,000	4th
26 December 1935	Aston Villa	H	4–1	Chester, Butt (2), Lythgoe	19,316	2nd
28 December 1935	Preston North End	A	0–4		21,487	3rd
4 January 1936	Brentford	H	2–2	Luke, Mountford (pen)	17,682	3rd
15 January 1936	Manchester City	A	2–1	Barkas (og), B. Brown	30,000	2nd
18 January 1936	Derby County	A	0–2		18,873	3rd
29 January 1936	Everton	H	2–1	Chester, Lythgoe	3,404	3rd
1 February 1936	Bolton Wanderers	A	2–1	Luke, Chester	30,852	2nd
8 February 1936	Leeds United	H	1–2	Lythgoe	20,862	3rd
19 February 1936	Middlesbrough	H	4–1	Richardson (3), Chivers	4,366	3rd
22 February 1936	Grimsby Town	A	1–1	Chester	10,994	3rd
29 February 1936	Blackburn Rovers	H	1–1	Chivers	3,886	2nd
7 March 1936	Arsenal	A	1–1	Chivers	43,930	3rd
14 March 1936	Liverpool	H	1–0	Chester	15,532	2nd
21 March 1936	Stoke City	A	0–1		22,000	3rd
28 March 1936	West Bromwich Albion	H	2–3	Chivers, Butt	11,694	3rd
4 April 1936	Chelsea	A	0–1		30,000	4th
10 April 1936	Portsmouth	A	0–0		25,099	3rd
11 April 1936	Birmingham	H	1–0	Mountford (pen)	9,753	3rd
14 April 1936	Portsmouth	H	1–1	Beech	9,559	3rd
18 April 1936	Sunderland	A	3–4	Richardson, Beech (2)	27,859	3rd
25 April 1936	Manchester City	H	1–1	Beech	8,258	3rd
2 May 1936	Sheffield Wednesday	H	1–0	Richardson	8,101	3rd

=== FA Cup ===
Date	Round	Opponents	Home/ Away	Result F – A	Scorers	Attendance
11 January 1936	Round 3	Aston Villa	A	1–0	Luke	62,620
25 January 1936	Round 4	Tottenham Hotspur	A	0–1		64,149

== Appearances and goals ==
Name	Nationality	Position	League		FA Cup		Total	
Name	Nationality	Position	Apps	Goals	Apps	Goals	Apps	Goals
Len Beaumont	England	MF	4	0	0	0	4	0
Albert Beech	England	DF	16	4	0	0	16	4
Alan Brown	England	DF	6	0	0	0	6	0
Buster Brown	England	MF	19	1	2	0	21	1
Len Butt	England	FW	42	6	2	0	44	6
Reg Chester	England	FW	17	5	0	0	17	5
Frank Chivers	England	FW	12	4	0	0	12	4
Benny Craig	England	DF	37	0	2	0	39	0
Bill Hayes	Ireland	DF	1	0	0	0	1	0
Bob Hesford	England	GK	2	0	0	0	2	0
Tommy Lang	Scotland	MF	11	2	0	0	11	2
Charlie Luke	England	FW	23	5	2	1	25	6
Alf Lythgoe	England	FW	27	15	2	0	29	15
Reg Mountford	England	DF	42	4	2	0	44	4
Duncan Ogilvie	Scotland	MF	10	0	0	0	10	0
Jimmy Richardson	England	FW	39	10	2	0	41	10
George Roughton	England	DF	4	0	0	0	4	0
Hugh Turner	England	GK	40	0	2	0	42	0
Ted Widdowfield	England	MF	5	0	0	0	5	0
Jock Wightman	Scotland	DF	27	0	2	0	29	0
Jackie Williams	Wales	MF	2	1	0	0	2	1
Ken Willingham	England	DF	39	1	2	0	41	1
Alf Young	England	DF	36	0	2	0	38	0
John Yuill	Scotland	MF	1	0	0	0	1	0
