= 1941–42 Aberdeen F.C. season =

Aberdeen F.C.
1941–42 season
- Manager: Dave Halliday
- North Eastern League: 3rd (Series 1), 2nd (Series 2)
- North Eastern Football League Cup 1: Winners
- Mitchell Cup: Winners
- Top goalscorer: League: Andy McCall (16); All: Andy McCall (18)
- Highest home attendance: 10,000 vs. Rangers "A", 6 September vs. East Fife, 9 May vs. Dundee United, 23 May vs. Dundee United, 6 June
- Lowest home attendance: 2,000 vs. Raith Rovers, 14 January

== Results ==
=== North Eastern League Series 1 ===
Match Day	Date	Opponent	H/A	Score	Aberdeen Scorer(s)	Attendance
1	9 August	Raith Rovers	A	4–2	McCall (2), McLeod, Donaldson	2,000
2	16 August	Leith Athletic	H	9–0	Walls (3), Clewrow (3), Donaldson, Taylor, McCall (penalty)	4,000
3	23 August	Dundee United	A	0–5		6,500
4	30 August	Dunfermline Athletic	H	4–0	Donaldson (2), Walls, McCall	7,000
5	6 September	Rangers "A"	H	1–1	McCall	10,000
6	13 September	St Bernard's	H	7–1	Milne (3), McCall (2), McLeod, Dyer	0
7	20 September	East Fife	A	0–1		0
8	27 September	Raith Rovers	H	7–1	McLeod (3), Dickie, Dunlop, McCall, Donaldson	3,000
9	4 October	Rangers "A"	A	1–1	McCall	2,000
10	11 October	Leith Athletic	A	4–3	Strauss (2), Taylor, Donaldson	10,000
11	18 October	Dunfermline Athletic	A	1–3	Bain	0
12	25 October	East Fife	H	1–1	Armstrong	0
13	1 November	Dundee United	H	4–2	McCall (2), Donaldson (2)	0
14	8 November	St Bernard's	A	6–2	McCall (3), Dyer (2), Bain	7,000

==== Final League table ====
Pos	Team	Pld	W	D	L	GF	GA	GD	Pts
2	East Fife	14	8	5	1	34	16	+18	21
3	Aberdeen	14	8	3	3	49	23	+26	19
4	Dunfermline Athletic	14	6	3	5	38	44	−6	15

=== North Eastern League Series 2 ===
Match Day	Date	Opponent	H/A	Score	Aberdeen Scorer(s)	Attendance
1	1 January	Rangers "A"	A	3–1	McCall, Strauss, Lyon (penalty)	0
2	3 January	St Bernard's	H	5–1	Mutch (2), Donaldson, McCall, Dickie	0
3	10 January	Dundee United	A	0–2		0
4	17 January	Raith Rovers	H	3–5	Lyon (2), Armstrong	2,000
5	14 February	Raith Rovers	A	1–2	Unknown	2,500
6	21 February	Rangers "A"	H	0–0		0
7	14 March	East Fife	H	1–0	Sharpe	0
8	21 March	Dunfermline Athletic	A	2–1	Pattillo (2)	0
9	28 March	Leith Athletic	A	2–0	Pattillo, Dyer	0
10	4 April	East Fife	A	1–1	Steele	0
11	11 April	Leith Athletic	H	3–0	Steele, Strauss, Taylor	0
12	18 April	Dunfermline Athletic	H	2–1	Pattillo (2)	0
13	25 April	St Bernard's	H	8–0	Pattillo (3), Drury (2), Dryden, G. Graham, Gourlay,	0
14	6 June	Dundee United	H	6–1	Armstrong (2), Woodburn (2), Williams, Baxter	10,000

==== Final League table ====
Pos	Team	Pld	W	D	L	GF	GA	GD	BP	Pts
1	Rangers "A"	14	10	1	3	49	33	+16	5	26
2	Aberdeen	14	9	2	3	37	15	+22	6	26
3	East Fife	14	8	2	4	32	27	+5	4	22

Rules for classification: Bonus points: 3 points were awarded for an away win, 2 points for an away draw

=== North Eastern Cup ===
Round	Date	Opponent	H/A	Score	Aberdeen Scorer(s)	Attendance
R1 L1	15 November	Dunfermline Athletic	H	2–3	Lyon, McCall, Bain	0
R1 L2	22 November	Dunfermline Athletic	A	2–0	McCall, Williams	2,000
SF L1	29 November	Rangers "A"	H	3–0	Williams, Young, Lyon	0
SF L2	6 December	Rangers "A"	A	1–1	Hamilton	15,000
F L1	13 December	Dundee United	A	1–4	Donaldson	8,000
F L2	20 December	Dundee United	H	6–2	Donaldson (2), Williams, Anderson, Lyon, Morgan	0

=== Mitchell Cup ===
Round	Date	Opponent	H/A	Score	Aberdeen Scorer(s)	Attendance
SF L1	2 May	East Fife	A	1–1	Darby	0
SF L2	9 May	East Fife	H	1–0	Howe	10,000
F L1	16 May	Dundee United	A	3–4	Gourlay, Milne, Pattillo	8,000
F L2	23 May	Dundee United	H	3–1	Williams, Pattillo, Gourlay	10,000

== Squad ==
=== Unofficial Appearances & Goals ===
No.	Pos	Nat	Player	Total		North Eastern League Series 1 & 2		North Eastern Cup		Mitchell Cup	
No.	Pos	Nat	Player	Apps	Goals	Apps	Goals	Apps	Goals	Apps	Goals
	GK	(Scotland) SCO	George Johnstone	30	0	22	0	4	0	4	0
	GK	(England) ENG	John Moody	2	0	2	0	0	0	0	0
	GK	??	Albert Lamb	2	0	2	0	0	0	0	0
	GK	??	Willie Bruce	1	0	1	0	0	0	0	0
	GK	??	William Fraser	1	0	1	0	0	0	0	0
	GK	??	John Brown	1	0	0	0	1	0	0	0
	DF	(Scotland) SCO	Frank Dunlop	38	1	28	1	6	0	4	0
	DF	(Scotland) SCO	Willie Cooper (c)	36	0	27	0	6	0	3	0
	DF	(England) ENG	William Lyon	26	6	20	3	6	3	0	0
	DF	(England) ENG	Alex Dyer	24	5	17	5	5	0	2	0
	DF	??	Robert Graham	19	0	16	0	2	0	1	0
	DF	(Scotland) SCO	Charlie Gavin	6	0	2	0	0	0	4	0
	DF	(England) ENG	Jack Howe	4	1	1	0	0	0	3	1
	DF	(Scotland) SCO	Andrew Beattie	3	0	3	0	0	0	0	0
	DF	(Scotland) SCO	Bobby Ancell	3	0	3	0	0	0	0	0
	DF	??	Andrew Gall	3	0	3	0	0	0	0	0
	DF	??	Thomas Gray	2	0	2	0	0	0	0	0
	DF	(Scotland) SCO	Willie Waddell	1	0	1	0	0	0	0	0
	DF	(England) ENG	Sid Nicholson	1	0	1	0	0	0	0	0
	MF	(Scotland) SCO	George Taylor	37	2	28	2	6	0	3	0
	MF	??	John Donaldson	22	12	16	9	6	3	0	0
	MF	(South Africa) SOU	Bill Strauss	4	4	4	4	0	0	0	0
	MF	(England) ENG	Sidney Clewlow	4	3	4	3	0	0	0	0
	MF	??	Frederick Taylor	2	1	2	1	0	0	0	0
	MF	(Scotland) SCO	Jimmy Woodburn	1	2	1	2	0	0	0	0
	MF	??	George Thomson	1	0	1	0	0	0	0	0
	FW	(Scotland) SCO	Andrew McCall	25	18	19	16	6	2	0	0
	FW	(Scotland) SCO	Billy Bain	13	3	10	2	3	1	0	0
	FW	(Scotland) SCO	Jock Pattillo	12	10	8	8	0	0	4	2
	FW	(South Africa) SOU	Stan Williams	8	5	1	1	5	3	2	1
	FW	??	Edward McLeod	8	4	8	4	0	0	0	0
	FW	(Scotland) SCO	Matt Armstrong	6	4	6	4	0	0	0	0
	FW	(Scotland) SCO	Percy Dickie	6	2	5	2	0	0	1	0
	FW	(Scotland) SCO	Arthur Milne	5	4	2	3	0	0	3	1
	FW	(Scotland) SCO	Johnny Steele	5	2	5	2	0	0	0	0
	FW	(Scotland) SCO	George Hamilton	5	1	1	0	4	1	0	0
	FW	(Scotland) SCO	Robert Walls	4	4	4	4	0	0	0	0
	FW	??	Alex Gourlay	4	3	1	1	0	0	3	2
	FW	(England) ENG	George Drury	3	2	1	2	0	0	2	0
	FW	(Scotland) SCO	George Mutch	2	2	2	2	0	0	0	0
	FW	(Scotland) SCO	Arthur Baxter	2	1	2	1	0	0	0	0
	FW	??	?? Newman	2	0	2	0	0	0	0	0
	FW	??	G. Graham	1	1	1	1	0	0	0	0
	FW	(Scotland) SCO	William Anderson	1	1	0	0	1	1	0	0
	FW	??	?? Watson	1	0	1	0	0	0	0	0
	FW	(Scotland) SCO	Robert Jeffrey	1	0	1	0	0	0	0	0
	FW	??	George Jeffrey	1	0	1	0	0	0	0	0
	FW	??	George Robinson	1	0	1	0	0	0	0	0
	??	??	John Dryden	9	1	6	1	0	0	3	0
	??	??	William Fleming	7	0	3	0	4	0	0	0
	??	??	Alec Smith	4	0	4	0	0	0	0	0
	??	??	?? Sharpe	2	1	2	1	0	0	0	0
	??	??	Ian Hay	1	0	1	0	0	0	0	0
	??	??	John Gilmartin	1	0	1	0	0	0	0	0
	-	-	Unknown Player	1	1	1	1	0	0	0	0
