= 1944–45 Dundee F.C. season =

Dundee
1944–45 season
- Manager: George Anderson
- North Eastern Football League: Autumn: 1st, Winners; Spring: 5th
- N-E League Cup: Finalists
- Top goalscorer: League: Ronnie Turnbull (38); All: Ronnie Turnbull (39)
Home colours

The 1944–45 season was the first time since 1940 that Dundee fielded a team, having not played officially throughout the majority of World War II. Dundee would enter the North Eastern Football League, which was split into Autumn and Spring Series. Dundee would impress in their first official competition in years under new manager George Anderson, winning the Autumn series, before coming 5th in the Spring series. Dundee would also compete in the North Eastern League Cup in lieu of the suspended Scottish Cup, and made it to the final before being defeated by Aberdeen.

== Autumn series ==
Statistics provided by Dee Archive.

Match day	Date	Opponent	H/A	Score	Dundee scorer(s)	Attendance
1	12 August	Raith Rovers	A	4–2	Turnbull (2), Roberts, Miller	5,000
2	19 August	Aberdeen	H	2–1	Turnbull, Cox	13,000
3	26 August	Dundee United	A	2–1	Turnbull (2)	15,500
4	2 September	Rangers 'A'	H	5–3	Anderson (3), Gray, Roberts	16,132
5	9 September	Heart of Midlothian 'A'	A	3–1	Anderson (2), Hill	1,700
6	16 September	Arbroath	A	4–1	Turnbull (3), Auld	5,500
7	23 September	Falkirk	H	1–2	Turnbull	11,000
8	30 September	Heart of Midlothian 'A'	H	6–0	Turnbull (3), Auld, McCall (2)	11,000
9	7 October	East Fife	A	0–1		6,000
10	14 October	Arbroath	H	6–2	Auld (2), Anderson (4)	6,100
11	21 October	Raith Rovers	H	4–6	Hill, Gray, Turnbull, Collins	10,042
12	28 October	Aberdeen	A	3–2	Anderson (3)	15,000
13	4 November	Dundee United	H	2–2	Ruse, Anderson	10,800
14	11 November	Dunfermline Athletic	A	4–3	McCall, Anderson, Blyth (o.g.), McKenzie	5,000
15	18 November	Falkirk	A	2–1	Anderson, Turnbull	4,000
16	25 November	East Fife	H	1–1	Turnbull	10,300
17	2 December	Rangers 'A'	A	1–0	Anderson	6,000
18	9 December	Dunfermline Athletic	H	3–1	Anderson (2), Hill	13,500

=== Autumn Series table ===
Pos	Team	Pld	W	D	L	GF	GA	GD	Pts
1	Dundee (C)	18	13	2	3	56	30	+26	28
2	Aberdeen	18	13	1	4	65	21	+44	27
3	Raith Rovers	18	10	2	6	42	32	+10	22

Updated to match(es) played on unknown. Source:

== Spring series ==
Statistics provided by Dee Archive.

Match day	Date	Opponent	H/A	Score	Dundee scorer(s)	Attendance
1	1 January	Aberdeen	A	0–5		16,000
2	2 January	Dundee United	H	4–0	Auld, Turnbull (2), Anderson	10,600
3	6 January	Falkirk 'A'	H	5–1	Turnbull (3), McCall, Ancell	9,000
4	13 January	Heart of Midlothian 'A'	A	3–5	Ewen, Turnbull (2)	3,000
5	10 February	East Fife	A	4–1	Hill, Turnbull (2), Ewen	2,500
6	17 February	Rangers 'A'	A	5–2	Turnbull (2), Woodburn (o.g.), McCall, Ewen	9,000
7	24 February	Heart of Midlothian 'A'	H	5–1	Dunn (o.g.), McCall, Turnbull (2), Hill	8,000
8	3 March	Dundee United	A	4–0	Ruse, Turnbull, Hill, Gray	11,000
9	10 March	Rangers 'A'	H	2–3	Ewen, Ancell	14,205
10	17 March	Falkirk 'A'	A	2–1	Ventre, Ruse	4,000
11	24 March	Raith Rovers	A	1–2	Ewen	4,000
12	31 March	Arbroath	H	4–2	Turnbull (3), Auld	8,300
13	7 April	Aberdeen	H	1–4	Ewen	13,200
14	14 April	Dunfermline Athletic	A	0–2		1,200
15	21 April	East Fife	H	3–2	Turnbull (2), Smith	9,000
16	28 April	Arbroath	A	1–2	Turnbull	2,500
17	5 May	Raith Rovers	H	4–0	Smith, Turnbull (3)	8,000
18	12 May	Dunfermline Athletic	H	1–2	Anderson	7,370

=== Spring Series table ===
P	Team	Pld	W	D	L	GF	GA	Pts
4	Dunfermline Athletic	18	9	3	6	38	35	21
5	Dundee	18	10	0	8	49	36	20
6	Dundee United	18	7	2	9	31	54	16

== North Eastern League Cup ==
Statistics provided by Dee Archive.

Match day	Date	Opponent	H/A	Score	Dundee scorer(s)	Attendance
Semi-finals, 1st leg	16 December	Raith Rovers	H	2–1	Moir, Anderson	4,127
Semi-finals, 2nd leg	23 December	Raith Rovers	A	2–0	Turnbull, Hill	5,000
Final	30 December	Aberdeen	H	0–5		19,098

== Player statistics ==
Statistics provided by Dee Archive

No.	Pos	Nat	Player	Total		NEFL Total		NEFL Cup	
No.	Pos	Nat	Player	Apps	Goals	Apps	Goals	Apps	Goals
	DF	(Scotland) SCO	Bobby Ancell	19	2	19	2	0	0
	FW	(Scotland) SCO	Willie Anderson	23	21	21	20	2	1
	FW	(Scotland) SCO	Jimmy Andrews	5	0	5	0	0	0
	FW	(Scotland) SCO	Robert Auld	14	6	14	6	0	0
	MF	(Scotland) SCO	John Barron	1	0	1	0	0	0
	FW	(Scotland) SCO	Alec Beaton	3	0	3	0	0	0
	GK	(Scotland) SCO	Reuben Bennett	33	0	30	0	3	0
	DF	(British Raj) BIN	Doug Berrie	1	0	1	0	0	0
	FW	(Scotland) SCO	Alec Collins	1	0	1	0	0	0
	FW	(Scotland) SCO	William Cowie	1	0	1	0	0	0
	DF	(Scotland) SCO	Sammy Cox	34	1	32	1	2	0
	MF	(Scotland) SCO	Archibald Downie	1	0	1	0	0	0
	FW	(Scotland) SCO	Ernie Ewen	24	6	21	6	3	0
	FW	(Scotland) SCO	Andrew Gay	1	0	1	0	0	0
	MF	(Scotland) SCO	Tommy Gray	36	3	33	3	3	0
	GK	(Scotland) SCO	Roy Henderson	4	0	4	0	0	0
	FW	(Scotland) SCO	George Hill	32	7	29	6	3	1
	MF	(Scotland) SCO	John Laurie	2	0	2	0	0	0
	MF	(Scotland) SCO	Dave Lorimer	1	0	1	0	0	0
	FW	(Scotland) SCO	George Marshalsay	2	0	2	0	0	0
	FW	(Scotland) SCO	Andy McCall	21	6	20	6	1	0
	MF	(Scotland) SCO	Gibby McKenzie	39	1	36	1	3	0
	FW	(Scotland) SCO	William Miller	1	1	1	1	0	0
	MF	(Scotland) SCO	Jimmy Milne	1	0	1	0	0	0
	FW	(Scotland) SCO	Billy Moir	5	1	3	0	2	1
	MF	(Scotland) SCO	Jimmy Morgan	1	0	1	0	0	0
	GK	(Scotland) SCO	John Niven	2	0	2	0	0	0
	DF	(Scotland) SCO	Bobby Rennie	9	0	9	0	0	0
	FW	(Scotland) SCO	Sam Roberts	4	2	4	2	0	0
	FW	(Scotland) SCO	Vic Ruse	12	3	12	3	0	0
	FW	(Scotland) SCO	Alex Smith	2	0	2	0	0	0
	FW	(England) ENG	Reg Smith	21	2	18	2	3	0
	FW	(Scotland) SCO	William Sword	1	0	1	0	0	0
	DF	(Scotland) SCO	Charlie Thomson	12	0	9	0	3	0
	FW	(England) ENG	Ronnie Turnbull	34	39	32	38	2	1
	FW	(Scotland) SCO	John Ventre	3	1	3	1	0	0
	DF	(Scotland) SCO	Willie Westwater	23	0	20	0	3	0

== See also ==
- List of Dundee F.C. seasons
