= 1958–59 Dundee United F.C. season =

Dundee United
1958–59 season
- Chairman: J. Johnston-Grant
- Manager: Tommy Gray (to October), Andy McCall (from October)
- Stadium: Tannadice Park
- Scottish Second Division: 17th W9 D7 L20 F62 A86 P25
- Scottish Cup: Round 2
- League Cup: Group stage

The 1958–59 season was the 51st year of football played by Dundee United, and covers the period from 1 July 1958 to 30 June 1959. United finished in seventeenth place in the Second Division.

== Match results ==
Dundee United played a total of 46 competitive matches during the 1958–59 season.

=== Legend ===
Win
Draw
Loss

All results are written with Dundee United's score first. Own goals in italics

=== Second Division ===
Date	Opponent	Venue	Result	Attendance	Scorers
20 August 1958	East Stirlingshire	H	2–5	2,000	
3 September 1958	Forfar Athletic	H	3–2	2,000	
6 September 1958	St Johnstone	A	4–3	3,700	
10 September 1958	Brechin City	A	0–1	1,200	
13 September 1958	Hamilton Academical	H	3–1	4,500	
17 September 1958	Forfar Athletic	A	2–2	1,500	
20 September 1958	Dumbarton	A	3–4	7,500	
27 September 1958	Stenhousemuir	H	5–2	4,600	
4 October 1958	East Fife	A	1–5	2,600	
11 October 1958	Queen's Park	A	1–2	3,156	
25 October 1958	Berwick Rangers	H	4–1	3,500	
1 November 1958	Alloa Athletic	A	1–3	700	
8 November 1958	Ayr United	A	2–6	1,000	
15 November 1958	Cowdenbeath	H	2–0	3,500	
22 November 1958	Montrose	A	1–1	1,200	
29 November 1958	Arbroath	A	2–3	4,400	
6 December 1958	Stranraer	A	1–4	1,400	
13 December 1958	Albion Rovers	H	3–4	2,000	
20 December 1958	Greenock Morton	A	1–2	5,000	
27 December 1958	East Stirlingshire	A	1–1	1,000	
1 January 1959	St Johnstone	H	2–3	4,000	
3 January 1959	Hamilton Academical	A	0–1	5,000	
10 January 1959	Dumbarton	H	1–1	3,000	
17 January 1959	Stenhousemuir	A	0–1	1,000	
24 January 1959	East Fife	H	1–1	2,000	
7 February 1959	Queen's Park	H	1–1	3,000	
21 February 1959	Berwick Rangers	A	2–8	1,245	
7 March 1959	Ayr United	H	2–3	4,000	
14 March 1959	Cowdenbeath	A	0–6	1,000	
21 March 1959	Montrose	H	3–0	1,500	
28 March 1959	Arbroath	A	3–1	3,6440	
4 April 1959	Stranraer	H	1–0	1,600	
11 April 1959	Albion Rovers	A	1–3	1,500	
18 April 1959	Greenock Morton	H	4–1	2,000	
22 April 1959	Alloa Athletic	H	1–1	1,500	
25 April 1959	Brechin City	H	1–2	2,200	

=== Scottish Cup ===
Date	Rd	Opponent	Venue	Result	Attendance	Scorers
9 February 1959	R1	East Stirlingshire	A	1–1	1,100	
10 February 1959	R1 R	East Stirlingshire	H	0–0	2,700	
11 February 1959	R1 2R	East Stirlingshire	H	4–0	2,480	
14 February 1959	R2	Third Lanark	H	0–4	11,882	

=== League Cup ===
Date	Rd	Opponent	Venue	Result	Attendance	Scorers
9 August 1958	G6	St Johnstone	A	2–1	6,200	
13 August 1958	G6	Cowdenbeath	H	1–3	5,000	
16 August 1958	G6	Greenock Morton	H	1–4	8,000	
23 August 1958	G6	St Johnstone	H	5–3	3,500	
27 August 1958	G6	Cowdenbeath	A	1–6	3,000	
30 August 1958	G6	Greenock Morton	A	1–6	6,500	

== See also ==
- 1958–59 in Scottish football
