= List of Dundee United F.C. managers =

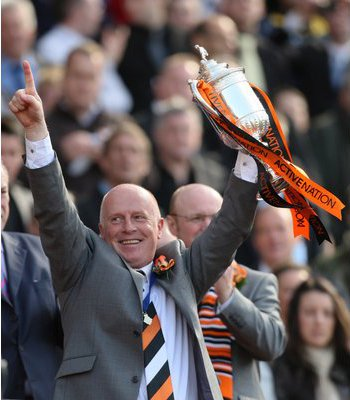
Peter Houston won the 2010 Scottish Cup Final as Dundee United manager

Dundee United Football Club is a professional football club based in Dundee, Scotland. Since being formed in 1909 as Dundee Hibernian, the club has employed a manager to run the team, the first being Pat Reilly. The club's longest serving and most successful manager is Jim McLean, who held the position from 1971 to 1993 and won three major honours – the Scottish Football League Premier Division title in 1982-83 and consecutive Scottish League Cup wins in 1979 and 1980. Two Dundee United managers have won the Scottish Cup – Ivan Golac in 1994 and Peter Houston in 2010.

== Managerial history ==
Dundee Hibernian's first manager, Pat Reilly, had no previous background in professional football, but was one of a group of local businessmen who had set up the club. Initially the role was "secretary-manager", with the emphasis as much on the administrative business of the club as on running the football team. Reilly had a flair for publicity, and under him the club successfully applied for membership of the Scottish Football League in 1910. Apart from a two-year spell during the First World War when he was replaced by the club's first player-manager, Herbert Dainty, Reilly remained in the role until 1922, shortly before the club was reorganised as Dundee United.

Former Scotland goalkeeper Jimmy Brownlie was the club's most successful manager in the interwar period. He had three spells in charge, the last as co-manager with Sam Irving. Under Brownlie, United won the Division Two title in the 1924-25 season, their first national honour, and entered the top flight of Scottish football for the first time. Although relegated in 1927, they won the Second Division again in 1928-29 and were promoted for a third time in 1930-31, shortly before the end of Brownlie's first spell as manager.

Prior to the appointment of former player Jerry Kerr as manager in 1959, Dundee United had spent only four seasons in Division One, and had been absent from it since 1932. After winning promotion in Kerr's first season in charge, the club became established in the top flight of Scottish football, and between 1960 and 2016 spent only one season below it. Under Kerr, United reached their first major national semi-final in 1963 and qualified for European competition for the first time in 1966, recording a notable victory over Fairs Cup holders Barcelona. Kerr retired as manager in 1971, to be replaced by Jim McLean.

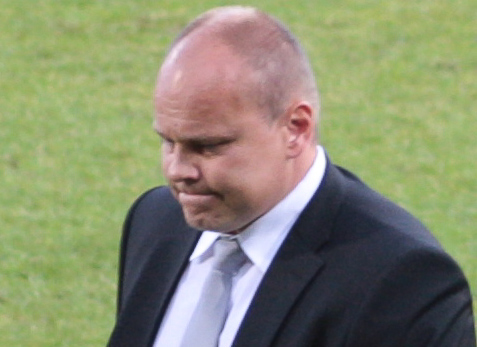
Mixu Paatelainen was in charge from October 2015 to May 2016, with the title of head coach

Building on Kerr's achievements, McLean instituted a successful youth policy that set the foundations for future success. The club won their first major honour, the Scottish League Cup, in 1979 and retained the trophy in 1980. The club became champions of Scotland for the first time when they won the Scottish Football League Premier Division title in 1982-83. During the 1980s, McLean's United teams regularly made significant progress in European competitions, reaching the European Cup semi-finals in 1984 and the UEFA Cup final in 1987. Under McLean, however, Dundee United developed a reputation for failing in major finals at Hampden Park; he never won the Scottish Cup, losing six finals, whilst there were also two League Cup final defeats.

McLean spent 21 years as manager of Dundee United until his retirement in 1993, becoming the club's longest serving manager. At that point, the club had had only two managers in a 34-year period, but since then have had a much higher turnover. Liam Fox, appointed in 2022, is the club's twentieth manager or head coach in the 29 years since McLean. Up until 2000, McLean himself had chosen his successors, having become club chairman in 1988 and initially combining this role with that of manager, a unique situation in Scottish football. His immediate successor, Ivan Golac, won the previously elusive Scottish Cup in 1994, but he left the club the following year shortly before United were relegated after 35 years in the top flight. Promotion back to the Premier Division was won under Billy Kirkwood, who was followed as manager by Tommy McLean, the chairman's brother. Dundee United won the Scottish Cup for a second time in 2010, under Peter Houston. Other managers to have taken the club to major cup finals are Tommy McLean, Gordon Chisholm, Craig Levein and Jackie McNamara.

Following another relegation from the top flight in 2016, Ray McKinnon led the team to win the Challenge Cup for lower division clubs in 2017. Promotion back to the Premiership was achieved under Robbie Neilson in 2019-20, with United declared champions in a season cut short by the COVID-19 pandemic.

== List ==
Managerial dates are sourced from Rundo & Watson (2009) and Soccerbase. Statistics are taken from the Arab Archive website and include all national and international competitions. Matches in unofficial wartime competitions played during the Second World War are included, but otherwise minor and local competitions (such as the Forfarshire Cup) are not; nor are matches that were abandoned or declared void, for example matches in the abandoned 1939-40 Scottish League season. Statistics are correct as of the match played on 28 February 2026.

Name	Nationality	From	To	P	W	D	L	F	A	Win %	Honours
Pat Reilly	Scotland	Jun 1909	Apr 1915	148	49	34	65	217	258	33.1	
Bert Dainty (Note: Player-manager)	England	Apr 1915	Dec 1917	No matches in major competitions							
Pat Reilly	Scotland	Dec 1917	Dec 1922	45	11	10	24	53	78	24.4	
Peter O'Rourke	Scotland	Dec 1922	Mar 1923	2	1	0	1	3	2	50.0	
Willie McAndrew (Note: Caretaker manager)	Scotland	Mar 1923	May 1923	No matches in major competitions							
Jimmy Brownlie (Note: Player-manager until 1924)	Scotland	Jun 1923	Apr 1931	328	129	74	125	596	597	39.3	Division Two 1925, 1929
Willie Reid	Scotland	Jun 1931	Mar 1934	109	32	17	60	193	278	29.4	
Jimmy Brownlie	Scotland	Mar 1934	Oct 1936	92	40	17	35	260	206	43.5	
George Greig	Scotland	Oct 1936	Apr 1938	61	17	12	32	86	137	27.9	
Jimmy Brownlie; Sam Irving (Note: Joint managers)	Scotland; Northern Ireland	Jul 1938	Jun 1939	36	16	3	17	81	74	44.4	
Bobby McKay	Scotland	Jun 1939	Oct 1939	2	2	0	0	2	0	100.0	
Jimmy Allan (Note: The club did not operate during the 1940-41 season; Allan was actually in charge until July 1940 and again from June 1941)	Scotland	Nov 1939	Oct 1942	84	34	14	36	199	201	40.5	
Jimmy Littlejohn	Scotland	Oct 1942	Nov 1944	72	27	5	40	144	197	37.5	
Charlie McGillivray	Scotland	Nov 1944	Oct 1945	34	10	3	21	55	111	29.4	
Willie MacFadyen	Scotland	Oct 1945	Aug 1954	340	127	55	158	705	760	37.4	
Reg Smith	England	Sep 1954	Jan 1957	110	38	27	45	235	229	34.5	
Ally Gallacher	Scotland	Jan 1957	Mar 1957	8	3	1	4	11	26	37.5	
Tommy Gray	Scotland	Mar 1957	Oct 1958	70	25	13	32	150	170	35.7	
Andy McCall	Scotland	Oct 1958	Apr 1959	30	6	8	16	43	64	20.0	
Jerry Kerr	Scotland	Jun 1959	Dec 1971	568	247	124	197	1060	950	43.5	
Jim McLean	Scotland	Dec 1971	May 1993	1112	535	270	307	1779	1160	48.1	Premier Division 1983; League Cup 1979, 1980
Ivan Golac	(Federal Republic of Yugoslavia) Yugoslavia	Aug 1993	Mar 1995	94	31	34	29	114	113	33.0	Scottish Cup 1994
Gordon Wallace	Scotland	Mar 1995	30 Mar 1995	2	0	1	1	2	3	0.0	
Billy Kirkwood	Scotland	30 Mar 1995	1 Sep 1996	61	29	14	18	106	63	47.5	
Tommy McLean	Scotland	10 Sep 1996	5 Sep 1998	93	36	27	30	134	107	38.7	
Paul Sturrock	Scotland	5 Sep 1998	7 Aug 2000	85	27	19	39	97	119	31.8	
Alex Smith	Scotland	8 Aug 2000	7 Oct 2002	99	31	23	45	109	149	31.3	
Paul Hegarty	Scotland	7 Oct 2002	30 Jan 2003	18	4	5	9	20	34	22.2	
Ian McCall	Scotland	30 Jan 2003	14 Mar 2005	91	28	23	40	116	149	30.8	
Gordon Chisholm	Scotland	14 Mar 2005	10 Jan 2006	36	10	10	16	40	54	27.8	
Billy Dodds	Scotland	10 Jan 2006	16 Jan 2006	1	1	0	0	2	1	100.0	
Craig Brewster	Scotland	16 Jan 2006	29 Oct 2006	30	3	11	16	28	59	10.0	
Craig Levein	Scotland	30 Oct 2006	23 Dec 2009	136	55	40	41	185	160	40.4	
Peter Houston	Scotland	26 Dec 2009	28 Jan 2013	150	63	44	43	232	205	42.0	Scottish Cup 2010
Jackie McNamara	Scotland	30 Jan 2013	28 Sep 2015	119	51	24	44	192	173	42.9	
Dave Bowman	Scotland	28 Sep 2015	14 Oct 2015	1	0	0	1	0	3	0.0	
Mixu Paatelainen (Note: Head coach)	Finland	14 Oct 2015	4 May 2016	30	8	5	17	31	48	26.7	
Gordon Young	Scotland	5 May 2016	15 May 2016	3	2	1	0	10	7	66.7	
Ray McKinnon	Scotland	16 May 2016	24 Oct 2017	73	38	16	19	112	80	52.1	Challenge Cup 2017
Laurie Ellis	Scotland	24 Oct 2017	8 Nov 2017	2	2	0	0	4	1	100.0	
Csaba László	Hungary	8 Nov 2017	30 Sep 2018	45	18	13	14	70	59	40.0	
Laurie Ellis	Scotland	30 Sep 2018	8 Oct 2018	1	0	0	1	0	2	0.0	
Robbie Neilson	Scotland	8 Oct 2018	21 June 2020	70	40	16	14	111	62	57.1	Championship 2020 (Note: Second Tier)
Micky Mellon	Scotland	6 July 2020	25 May 2021	46	15	15	16	45	58	32.6	
Tam Courts	Scotland	7 June 2021	14 June 2022	47	18	13	16	51	53	38.3	
Jack Ross	Scotland	20 June 2022	30 August 2022	7	1	1	5	3	25	14.3	
Liam Fox	Scotland	30 August 2022	26 February 2023	25	7	4	14	30	35	28.0	
Jim Goodwin	Ireland	1 March 2023	Present	160	68	39	53	236	200	42.5	Championship 2024 (Note: Second Tier)
