= Hesford =

Hesford is a surname. Notable people with the surname include:

- Bob Hesford (1916–1982), British footballer
- Iain Hesford (1960–2014), British footballer
- Michael Bryan Hesford (1930–1996), British organist and composer
- Stephen Hesford (born 1957), British politician
- Steve Hesford, British rugby league footballer
