= Bob Hesford =

Bob Hesford may refer to:

- Bob Hesford (footballer) (1916–1982), English professional football goalkeeper for Huddersfield Town
- Bob Hesford (rugby union) (1953–2023), English rugby union international of the 1980s
