= Andy McCall =

Andy McCall may refer to:

- Andy McCall (footballer, born 1911) (1911–1979), Scottish football player
- Andy McCall (footballer, born 1925) (1925–2014), Scottish football player
