= Florrie Burke =

Irish footballer

Personal information
- Date of birth: 7 August 1918
- Place of birth: Cork, Ireland
- Date of death: 24 April 1995 (aged 76)
- Position: Centre-half

Youth career
- 1940: Blackrock Juniors

Senior career*
Years	Team	Apps	(Gls)
1941–1948	Cork United	?	(?)
1948–1950	Cork Athletic	?	(?)
1950–1953	Evergreen United.	?	(?)

International career^{‡}
195x	League of Ireland XI		
1951	Ireland	1	(0)
- * Club domestic league appearances and goals as of 1 December 2008 ‡ National team caps and goals as of 1 December 2008

Florrie Burke (7 August 1918 – 24 April 1995) was an Irish footballer who played for Cork United, Cork Athletic and Evergreen United. He also played for both Ireland and the League of Ireland XI. Burke was raised in the Ballintemple, Cork and was a talented junior hurler, playing with Blackrock. During the Second World War, Burke played for a very successful Cork United team. His United teammates included, among others, Jack O'Reilly, Bill Hayes, Owen Madden, Jackie O'Driscoll, Frank O'Farrell and Tommy Moroney. Burke helped United win several League of Ireland titles and in 1942 they won an FAI Cup / League double. On 17 October 1951, while playing for Cork Athletic, he also helped Ireland to a 3-2 win against West Germany at Dalymount Park. Despite playing a starring role in the game, this was Burke's only international cap. He subsequently joined Evergreen United after a contract dispute and in 1953 played for them in the first all-Cork FAI Cup final against Athletic.

== Honours ==
Cork United

- League of Ireland
  - Winners 1942, 1943, 1945, 1946, 1951 5
- FAI Cup
  - Winners 1942, 1947 2
- League of Ireland Shield
  - Winners 1943, 1948 2
- Munster Senior Cup
  - Winners 1941, 1945, 1946, 1947 4

Cork Athletic

- League of Ireland
  - Winners 1950 1
