= Ted Widdowfield =

English footballer (1915–1983)

Personal information
- Full name: Edward Widdowfield
- Date of birth: 25 March 1915
- Place of birth: Hetton-le-Hole, England
- Date of death: 8 November 1983 (aged 68)
- Place of death: Newark-on-Trent, England
- Height: 5 ft 10 1/2 in (1.79 m)
- Positions: Outside right; centre forward

Senior career*
Years	Team	Apps	(Gls)
- Hetton Lyons Welfare
1933–1934	Bishop Auckland		
1933–1935	Birtley		
1935–1936	Huddersfield Town	5	(0)
1936–1946	Halifax Town	83	(37)
1946–1948	Ransome & Marles		
1949–1950	Peterborough United	46	(20)
1950–195?	Ransome & Marles		
- * Club domestic league appearances and goals

Edward Widdowfield (25 March 1915 – 8 November 1983) was an English professional footballer who played in the Football League for Huddersfield Town and Halifax Town. An outside right who became a centre forward, he also played non-league football for Hetton Lyons Welfare, Bishop Auckland, Birtley, Ransome & Marles and Peterborough United.

== Life and career ==
Widdowfield was born in Hetton-le-Hole, County Durham, in 1915, a son of James Widdowfield, coal miner and local councillor, and his wife, Phillis née Pearson. In his teenage years, he engaged in pedestrianism – professional sprinting – as well as playing football for his local team, Hetton Lyons Welfare, Bishop Auckland and Birtley. His goalscoring from the outside-right position earned him offers of trials with clubs including Birmingham, Burnley, Crystal Palace and Hartlepools United, and in October 1935, he signed for Huddersfield Town of the Football League First Division.

Widdowfield made his Football League debut on 2 November at home to Chelsea, replacing Tommy Lang. Huddersfield won 2–0, and Widdowfield kept his place for the next three matches. Although the Leeds Mercury wrote that he "showed great promise in his few senior side games", he played only once more for the first team in the next twelve months, and moved on to Halifax Town of the Third Division North in November 1936.

Halifax Town's manager, Jimmy Thomson, had brought in Widdowfield for his pace and crossing ability, and he played regularly at outside right for his first few months at the club. He lost his place early in the 1937–38 season, and was put on the transfer list at his own request. No move ensued, and in January 1938, Thomson tried Widdowfield at centre forward, a position that had been problematic since top scorer Albert Valentine had left six months earlier. In his 61 league matches before the Second World War brought an end to competitive football, he scored 34 goals, including all four as Halifax came back from 3–0 down to Accrington Stanley to win 4–3, and was the club's top scorer in both pre-war seasons

Widdowfield married Isabella Stabler in 1935. The 1939 Register lists him as a carpenter and footballer living in Chevinedge Crescent, Halifax, with his wife and child. He served with the Halifax police during the Second World War before joining the Royal Air Force in 1941. When other duties permitted, he played football for Halifax Town in the wartime competitions and made one appearance in the first post-war edition of the FA Cup, before leaving for the Newark, Nottinghamshire, area where he had settled. He played Midland League football for Ransome & Marles, and spent the 1949–50 season with Peterborough United, scoring 20 goals from 45 Midland League matches, before returning to Ransome & Marles, who had by then left the Midland League for the Central Alliance.

Widdowfield remained in the Newark area, where he died in 1983 at the age of 68.

== Career statistics ==
Appearances and goals by club, season and competition
Club	Season	League			FA Cup		Other		Total	
Club	Season	Division	Apps	Goals	Apps	Goals	Apps	Goals	Apps	Goals
Huddersfield Town	1935–36	First Division	5	0	0	0	—		5	0
Huddersfield Town	1936–37	First Division	0	0	0	0	—		0	0
Huddersfield Town	Total		5	0	0	0	—		5	0
Halifax Town	1936–37	Third Division North	18	3	1	0	—		19	3
Halifax Town	1937–38	Third Division North	25	11	0	0	1 (Note: Appearance in Third Division North Cup)	0	26	11
Halifax Town	1938–39	Third Division North	40	23	6	6	—		46	29
Halifax Town	1945–46	Third Division North	—		1	0	—		1	0
Halifax Town	Total		83	37	8	6	1	0	92	43
Peterborough United	1949–50	Midland League	46	20	3	4	—		49	24
Career total			134	57	11	10	1	0	146	67
