= John Yuill =

John Yuill may refer to:

- John Yuill (footballer), Scottish professional footballer
- John Yuill (tennis), South African tennis player
