= 1956–57 Dundee United F.C. season =

Dundee United
1956–57 season
- Chairman: J. Johnston-Grant
- Manager: Reg Smith (to January); Tommy Gray (from January)
- Stadium: Tannadice Park
- Scottish Second Division: 13th W14 D6 L16 F75 A80 P34
- Scottish Cup: Round 6
- League Cup: Quarter-final

The 1956–57 season was the 49th year of football played by Dundee United, and covers the period from 1 July 1956 to 30 June 1957. United finished in thirteenth place in the Second Division.

== Match results ==
Dundee United played a total of 50 competitive matches during the 1956–57 season.

=== Legend ===
Win
Draw
Loss

All results are written with Dundee United's score first. Own goals in italics

=== Second Division ===
Date	Opponent	Venue	Result	Attendance	Scorers
22 August 1956	Alloa Athletic	A	2-2	1,500	
19 September 1956	Alloa Athletic	H	4-3	3,000	
22 September 1956	St Johnstone	A	2-3	7,000	
29 September 1956	Stranraer	H	2-2	4,000	
1 October 1956	Berwick Rangers	H	6-1	2,000	
6 October 1956	Stenhousemuir	A	1-3	1,500	
13 October 1956	Hamilton Academical	H	2-1	5,000	
27 October 1956	Third Lanark	H	0-1	4,000	
3 November 1956	Greenock Morton	A	1-5	3,000	
10 November 1956	Clyde	H	2-4	8,000	
17 November 1956	Forfar Athletic	H	2-1	4,500	
24 November 1956	Montrose	A	2-2	1,500	
1 December 1956	Albion Rovers	H	7-0	3,500	
8 December 1956	Dumbarton	A	2-3	5,000	
15 December 1956	Cowdenbeath	A	2-6	3,500	
22 December 1956	East Stirlingshire	H	3-1	1,200	
25 December 1956	Berwick Rangers	A	6-0	2,000	
1 January 1957	St Johnstone	H	1-2	5,000	
2 January 1957	Brechin City	A	0-0	2,500	
5 January 1957	Arbroath	H	1-0	5,800	
12 January 1957	Stranraer	A	0-1	1,835	
19 January 1957	Stenhousemuir	H	2-0	3,000	
26 January 1957	Hamiton Academical	A	1-4	2,000	
9 February 1957	Stirling Albion	H	2-0	5,500	
2 March 1957	Greenock Morton	H	0-7	3,500	
9 March 1957	Clyde	A	1-7	9,000	
16 March 1957	Forfar Athletic	A	1-3	1,000	
23 March 1957	Montrose	H	2-2	1,800	
30 March 1957	Albion Rovers	A	1-5	2,000	
8 April 1957	Arbroath	A	2-2	2,000	
13 April 1957	Cowdenbeath	H	4-1	3,000	
15 April 1957	Third Lanark	A	3-2	5,000	
17 April 1957	Dumbarton	H	3-1	1,500	
22 April 1957	Brechin City	H	2-1	1,500	
24 April 1957	Stirling Albion	A	1-2	1,000	
30 April 1957	East Stirlingshire	A	2-3	300	

=== Scottish Cup ===
Date	Rd	Opponent	Venue	Result	Attendance	Scorers
20 October 1956	R4	Third Lanark	H	5-2	7,000	
2 February 1957	R5	Stenhousemuir	A	1-1	2,169	
6 February 1957	R5 R	Stenhousemuir	H	4-0	4,151	
16 February 1957	R6	Raith Rovers	A	0-7	11,496	

=== League Cup ===
Date	Rd	Opponent	Venue	Result	Attendance	Scorers
11 August 1956	G8	Ayr United	H	6-1	7,000	
15 August 1956	G8	Stenhousemuir	A	2-3	5,000	
18 August 1956	G8	Third Lanark	A	2-1	6,000	
25 August 1956	G8	Ayr United	A	1-1	7,000	
29 August 1956	G8	Stenhousemuir	H	3-4	8,000	
1 September 1956	G8	Third Lanark	H	2-1	9,000	
3 September 1956	Play Off	Arbroath	A	0-2	2,400	
5 September 1956	Play Off	Arbroath	H	5-0	5,000	
12 September 1956	QF L1	Dundee	A	3-7	20,000	
15 September 1956	QF L2	Dundee	H	1-2	14,000	

== See also ==
- 1956–57 in Scottish football
