= Chivers =

Chivers is an English surname. Notable people with the surname include:

- Anthony Chivers (athlete) (1920–2015), English long-distance runner
- Anthony Chivers (sport shooter) (1936–2026), British sports shooter
- Barrie Chivers, Canadian politician
- C. J. (Christopher John) Chivers, American journalist
- Chloe Chivers (born 1999), Welsh footballer
- Dirk Chivers, Dutch pirate
- Frank Chivers, English footballer
- Gary Chivers, English footballer
- Martin Chivers (1945–2026), English footballer
- Thomas Holley Chivers, American poet

== See also ==
- Chivers and Sons, a British manufacturer of jams and preserves
- Chivers Biology Laboratory, part of the University of Saskatchewan
- The Chivers are a social group in the film Steak directed by Quentin Dupieux.
