= 1957–58 Dundee United F.C. season =

Dundee United
1957–58 season
- Chairman: J. Johnston-Grant
- Manager: Tommy Gray
- Stadium: Tannadice Park
- Scottish Second Division: 9th W12 D9 L15 F81 A77 P33
- Scottish Cup: Round 2
- League Cup: Group stage

The 1957–58 season was the 50th year of football played by Dundee United, and covers the period from 1 July 1957 to 30 June 1958. United finished in ninth place in the Second Division.

== Match results ==
Dundee United played a total of 44 competitive matches during the 1957–58 season.

=== Legend ===
Win
Draw
Loss

All results are written with Dundee United's score first. Own goals in italics

=== Second Division ===
Date	Opponent	Venue	Result	Attendance	Scorers
21 August 1957	Cowdenbeath	H	0–4	3,000	
4 September 1957	Arbroath	A	1–3	3,000	
7 September 1957	Ayr United	H	3–4	2,500	
11 September 1957	Cowdenbeath	A	1–1	3,000	
14 September 1957	East Stirlingshire	A	0–2	2,000	
18 September 1957	Arbroath	H	5–5	6,000	
21 September 1957	St Johnstone	H	2–1	4,000	
28 September 1957	Dumbarton	A	0–2	4,000	
5 October 1957	Stenhousemuir	H	1–5	3,500	
12 October 1957	Brechin City	A	1–1	1,700	
19 October 1957	Alloa Athletic	A	2–2	2,000	
2 November 1957	Dunfermline Athletic	A	1–6	5,000	
9 November 1957	Forfar Athletic	H	5–2	4,000	
16 November 1957	Berwick Rangers	A	2–1	1,216	
23 November 1957	Stirling Albion	H	1–2	5,000	
30 November 1957	Hamilton Academical	A	2–1	3,000	
7 December 1957	Greenock Morton	H	4–1	3,000	
14 December 1957	Albion Rovers	A	1–3	1,000	
21 December 1957	Montrose	A	2–3	1,000	
28 December 1957	Stranraer	H	0–0	3,000	
1 January 1958	St Johnstone	A	3–3	5,100	
2 January 1958	East Stirlingshire	H	7–0	4,000	
4 January 1958	Ayr United	A	1–1	5,000	
11 January 1958	Dumbarton	H	1–2	5,000	
18 January 1958	Stenhousemuir	A	6–1	500	
22 February 1958	Dunfermline Athletic	H	3–3	6,500	
1 March 1958	Forfar Athletic	A	1–1	1,000	
15 March 1958	Stirling Albion	A	3–5	3,000	
22 March 1958	Hamilton Academical	H	3–0	3,000	
29 March 1958	Greenock Morton	A	2–3	1,000	
5 April 1958	Albion Rovers	H	2–1	2,600	
12 April 1958	Montrose	H	2–1	3,000	
16 April 1958	Alloa Athletic	H	1–7	1,500	
26 April 1958	Stranraer	A	4–1	1,000	
28 April 1958	Brechin City	H	1–2	1,500	
3 May 1958	Berwick Rangers	H	7–0	5,100	

=== Scottish Cup ===
Date	Rd	Opponent	Venue	Result	Attendance	Scorers
15 February 1958	R1	Hibernian	H	0–0	15,543	
19 February 1958	R1 R	Hibernian	A	0–2	24,550	

=== League Cup ===
Date	Rd	Opponent	Venue	Result	Attendance	Scorers
10 August 1957	G5	Clyde	H	1–4	11,000	
14 August 1957	G5	Dumbarton	A	4–2	4,000	
17 August 1957	G5	Stranraer	A	4–2	2,300	
24 August 1957	G5	Clyde	A	1–8	5,000	
28 August 1957	G5	Dumbarton	H	0–3	5,000	
31 August 1957	G5	Stranraer	H	3–0	1,500	

== See also ==
- 1957–58 in Scottish football
