= 1952–53 Dundee United F.C. season =

Dundee United
1952–53 season
- Chairman: J. Johnston-Grant
- Manager: Willie MacFadyen
- Stadium: Tannadice Park
- Scottish Second Division: 8th W12 D5 L13 F52 A56 P29
- Scottish Cup: Round 1
- League Cup: Group stage

The 1952–53 season was the 45th year of football played by Dundee United, and covers the period from 1 July 1952 to 30 June 1953. United finished in fifteenth place in the Second Division.

== Match results ==
Dundee United played a total of 38 competitive matches during the 1952–53 season.

=== Legend ===
Win
Draw
Loss

All results are written with Dundee United's score first. Own goals in italics

=== Division B ===
Date	Opponent	Venue	Result	Attendance	Scorers
6 September 1952	Arbroath	A	1-2	3,417	
13 September 1952	Alloa Athletic	H	4-2	6,000	
20 September 1952	St Johnstone	A	1-1	5,000	
27 September 1952	Cowdenbeath	H	0-0	8,000	
4 October 1952	Stenhousemuir	A	4-0	2,500	
11 October 1952	Stirling Albion	H	2-3	3,000	
18 October 1952	Dumbarton	A	3-1	2,500	
25 October 1952	Hamilton Academical	H	2-3	5,000	
1 November 1952	Queen's Park	H	2-1	8,000	
8 November 1952	Albion Rovers	A	4-2	2,500	
15 November 1952	Ayr United	H	0-4	8,000	
22 November 1952	Greenock Morton	H	0-4	7,000	
29 November 1952	Alloa Athletic	A	2-6	2,500	
6 December 1952	Dunfermline Athletic	A	1-1	4,000	
13 December 1952	Forfar Athletic	H	4-1	2,000	
20 December 1952	Arbroath	H	1-2	8,600	
27 December 1952	Kilmarnock	A	0-1	9,192	
1 January 1953	St Johnstone	H	1-0	8,000	
3 January 1953	Cowdenbeath	A	0-0	2,500	
10 January 1953	Stenhousemuir	H	3-1	5,000	
17 January 1953	Stirling Albion	A	0-2	7,000	
31 January 1953	Dumbarton	H	2-3	1,500	
14 February 1953	Hamilton Academical	A	1-3	8,000	
21 February 1953	Queen's Park	A	0-3	2,629	
28 February 1953	Albion Rovers	H	2-1	3,500	
7 March 1953	Ayr United	A	1-2	6,000	
14 March 1953	Greenock Morton	A	2-1	3,000	
28 March 1953	Dunfermline Athletic	H	1-1	3,000	
4 April 1953	Forfar Athletic	A	3-1	1,000	
18 April 1953	Kilmarnock	H	5-4	2,000	

=== Scottish Cup ===
Date	Rd	Opponent	Venue	Result	Attendance	Scorers
24 January 1953	R1	Berwick Rangers	A	3-3	3,500	
28 January 1953	R1 R	Berwick Rangers	H	2-3	10,640	

=== League Cup ===
Date	Rd	Opponent	Venue	Result	Attendance	Scorers
9 August 1952	G6	Dumbarton	A	1-3	3,000	
13 August 1952	G6	Stirling Albion	H	2-6	5,000	
16 August 1952	G6	Ayr United	A	1-4	10,000	
23 August 1952	G6	Dumbarton	H	1-0	7,000	
27 August 1952	G6	Stirling Albion	A	1-6	6,000	
30 August 1952	G6	Ayr United	H	2-1	7,000	

== See also ==
- 1952–53 in Scottish football
