= 1950–51 Dundee United F.C. season =

Dundee United
1950–51 season
- Chairman: J. Johnston-Grant
- Manager: Willie MacFadyen
- Stadium: Tannadice Park
- Scottish Second Division: 4th W16 D4 L10 F78 A58 P36
- Scottish Cup: Round 1
- League Cup: Quarter-final

The 1950–51 season was the 43rd year of football played by Dundee United, and covers the period from 1 July 1950 to 30 June 1951. United finished in fourth place in the Second Division.

== Match results ==
Dundee United played a total of 40 competitive matches during the 1950–51 season.

=== Legend ===
Win
Draw
Loss

All results are written with Dundee United's score first. Own goals in italics

=== Division B ===
Date	Opponent	Venue	Result	Attendance	Scorers
9 September 1950	Dumbarton	A	1-1	7,000	
23 September 1950	St Johnstone	A	2-2	7,500	
30 September 1950	Kilmarnock	H	5-3	5,000	
2 October 1950	Hamilton Academical	H	1-3	3,000	
7 October 1950	Stenhousemuir	A	1-3	2,000	
14 October 1950	Dunfermline Athletic	H	5-1	10,000	
21 October 1950	Arbroath	H	3-4	10,000	
28 October 1950	Cowdenbeath	A	0-6	4,000	
4 November 1950	Stirling Albion	H	1-3	10,000	
11 November 1950	Forfar Athletic	A	3-1	2,500	
18 November 1950	Queen of the South	H	5-0	9,000	
25 November 1950	Albion Rovers	A	4-0	2,500	
2 December 1950	Ayr United	H	3-1	9,500	
9 December 1950	Queen's Park	H	3-2	10,500	
16 December 1950	Alloa Athletic	A	2-1	2,000	
23 December 1950	Dumbarton	H	3-2	8,500	
30 December 1950	Hamilton Academical	A	2-1	4,000	
1 January 1951	St Johnstone	H	2-0	13,500	
2 January 1951	Kilmarnock	A	0-2	9,785	
6 January 1951	Stenhousemuir	H	6-0	12,000	
20 January 1951	Arbroath	A	3-1	10,000	
3 February 1951	Cowdenbeath	H	1-5	10,000	
10 February 1951	Stirling Albion	A	1-3	7,000	
17 February 1951	Forfar Athletic	H	2-1	4,500	
24 February 1951	Queen of the South	A	3-3	7,500	
3 March 1951	Albion Rovers	H	2-1	9,000	
17 March 1951	Queen's Park	A	2-4	6,290	
24 March 1951	Alloa Athletic	H	10-1	6,000	
31 March 1951	Dunfermline Athletic	A	0-1	2,000	
28 April 1951	Ayr United	A	2-2	8,000	

=== Scottish Cup ===
Date	Rd	Opponent	Venue	Result	Attendance	Scorers
27 January 1951	R1	Dundee	A	2-2	38,000	
30 January 1951	R1 R	Dundee	H	0-1	22,000	

=== League Cup ===
Date	Rd	Opponent	Venue	Result	Attendance	Scorers
12 August 1950	G6	Stenhousemuir	H	2-1	11,000	
16 August 1950	G6	St Johnstone	A	5-2	8,000	
19 August 1950	G6	Cowdenbeath	A	2-2	5,500	
26 August 1950	G6	Stenhousemuir	A	2-3	2,000	
30 August 1950	G6	St Johnstone	H	4-1	10,000	
2 September 1950	G6	Cowdenbeath	H	4-1	15,000	
16 September 1950	QF L1	Ayr United	A	0-3	10,500	
20 September 1950	QF L2	Ayr United	H	1-2	15,000	

== See also ==
- 1950–51 in Scottish football
