= Tom Lyon (footballer) =

Scottish footballer (1915–1998)

Personal information
- Full name: Thomas King Lyon
- Date of birth: 17 March 1915
- Place of birth: Clydebank, Scotland
- Date of death: 26 November 1998 (aged 83)
- Place of death: Old Kilpatrick, Scotland
- Height: 5 ft 7 1/2 in (1.71 m)
- Position: Inside forward

Senior career*
Years	Team	Apps	(Gls)
1933	Clydebank Juniors		
1933–1934	Motherwell	0	(0)
1934	Yoker Athletic		
1934–1937	Albion Rovers	75	(29)
1936	→ Airdrieonians (loan)	10	(6)
1937–1938	Blackpool	6	(0)
1938–1948	Chesterfield	41	(22)
1948–1949	New Brighton	36	(7)
1949–19??	Prescot Cables		
- * Club domestic league appearances and goals

Thomas King Lyon (17 March 1915 – 26 November 1998) was a Scottish footballer who played in the Scottish League for Albion Rovers and Airdrieonians and in the English Football League for Blackpool, Chesterfield and New Brighton. An inside forward, he was on the books of Motherwell without playing for their first team, played junior football for Clydebank Juniors and Yoker Athletic, and played non-league football in England for Prescot Cables.

== Life and career ==
Lyon was born in 1915 in Clydebank, which was then in Dunbartonshire. He played football for his school, Clydebank High School, and appeared for Clydebank Juniors in 1933 while still a schoolboy. He attracted interest from senior clubs: after trials with Rangers and Partick Thistle, he signed for Division One club Motherwell. He played for Motherwell's "A" team in the Scottish Alliance, but not for the first team. At the end of the 1933–34 season, he successfully applied for reinstatement as a junior, and signed for Yoker Athletic.

Lyon's stay in the junior ranks was brief: he signed for Division One Albion Rovers in late September 1934, and went straight into the eleven to face Celtic. He scored 25 goals in 50 league matches between then and February 1936, when Rovers loaned him to Airdrieonians to help that club's struggle against relegation from Division One. He scored six goals from ten matches, and media speculation was that perhaps Rovers should have kept him as they slid lower in the table. The following season, Rovers themselves were on the point of relegation when they sold Lyon to Blackpool for £1200; the player did not want to leave, but agreed to do so when the club's financial problems were explained to him.

He appeared little for Blackpool, and moved on to Chesterfield in 1938; he was that club's top scorer in the 1938–39 season. When competitive football was abandoned on the outbreak of war, Lyon returned to Scotland. He made a few appearances for Celtic (alongside his brother Willie who was a regular in the side) in the Scottish regional league before suffering a groin injury and returning to Chesterfield. He served in the Army during the war, and when the Football League resumed, remained with the club for two seasons before joining New Brighton for one season and then moving into non-league football with Prescot Cables.

Lyon died in Old Kilpatrick, West Dunbartonshire, in 1998 at the age of 83.
