= Willie Hayes =

Irish footballer

Personal information
- Full name: William John Hayes
- Date of birth: 30 March 1928
- Place of birth: Limerick, Ireland
- Date of death: August 2014 (aged 86)
- Place of death: Torbay, England
- Position: Goalkeeper

Senior career*
Years	Team	Apps	(Gls)
19??–1950	Limerick		
1950–1951	Wrexham	14	(0)
1951–1952	Ellesmere Port		
1952–1956	Torquay United	54	(0)

International career
1949	Ireland	1	(0)
- * Club domestic league appearances and goals

William John Hayes, also referred to as Willie Hayes or Billy Hayes, (30 March 1928 – August 2014) was an Irish footballer who played as a goalkeeper for Limerick, Torquay United, Ellesmere Port and Wrexham.

As an international, Hayes also played for Ireland. Hayes was 21 when he made his one and only appearance for Ireland on 24 April 1949 in a 2–0 defeat to Belgium at Dalymount Park. His teammates on the day included Johnny Carey, Con Martin, Billy Walsh, Jackie O'Driscoll and Paddy Coad. Although a goalkeeper he was only 5 ft 9 inches tall. Another William Hayes also played for Ireland during the 1940s.
