= Owen Madden (footballer) =

Irish footballer

Personal information
- Date of birth: 5 December 1916
- Place of birth: Cork, Ireland
- Date of death: 20 January 1991 (aged 74)
- Place of death: Cork, Ireland
- Height: 5 ft 9 in (1.75 m)
- Positions: Outside left; inside left

Youth career
- Cork High School
- Cork Southern Rovers

Senior career*
Years	Team	Apps	(Gls)
19??–1936	Cork		
1936–1938	Norwich City	22	(1)
1938–1939	Birmingham	12	(1)
1938–1939	Cork City		
1939–19??	Sligo Rovers (guest)		
1939–1948	Cork United		
1948–19??	Cork Athletic		

International career
1936	Ireland (FAI)	1	(1)
1937	Ireland (IFA)	1	(0)
19??	League of Ireland XI	2	(?)

Managerial career
- 1953–19??: Cork Athletic
- * Club domestic league appearances and goals

Owen Madden (5 December 1916 – 20 January 1991) was an Irish footballer who played as a forward in the League of Ireland and the English Football League. Madden was a dual international who played for both Ireland teams – the FAI XI and the IFA XI.

== Club career ==
Madden first came to prominence as a goalscorer with Cork and in 1936 he helped the club reach the final of the FAI Cup. However shortly afterwards he became embroiled in controversy when it emerged that, together with Jack O'Reilly, he had signed for Norwich City before playing in the cup final on 19 April. When Cork F.C., who received no fee, protested over the moves, both Madden and O'Reilly were suspended by the FAI for three years. Despite this Madden failed to establish himself at either Norwich or Birmingham. The only highlight of his time in England came when he scored twice for Birmingham in an FA Cup tie against Everton on 11 February 1939. This game attracted a record attendance of 66,844 at St Andrew's.

Madden returned to the League of Ireland to play for a very successful Cork United team during the Second World War. His United teammates included, among others, Jack O'Reilly, Florrie Burke, Bill Hayes, Jackie O'Driscoll, Frank O'Farrell and Tommy Moroney. During the 1941–42 season he helped United to a League and Cup double, scoring 14 league goals in the process.

== International career ==
When Madden began his international career in 1948 there were, in effect, two Ireland teams, chosen by two rival associations. Both associations, the Northern Ireland-based IFA and the Irish Free State-based FAI, claimed jurisdiction over the whole of Ireland and selected players from the whole island. As a result, several notable Irish players from this era, including Madden, played for both teams.

=== FAI XI ===
While still a Cork player, Madden made his only appearance for the FAI XI during a European tour on 3 May 1936. He played in the opening game, a 3–3 draw with Hungary. Madden is credited by some sources with scoring the third Irish goal. However it has also been credited to Jimmy Dunne. Madden was injured during the game and took no further part in the tour, returning to his new club, Norwich City, for treatment. After being suspended by the FAI for three years, Madden was recalled in 1939 to play against Hungary but he declined the offer.

=== IFA XI ===
While playing for Norwich City, Madden made his one and only appearances for the IFA XI on 23 October 1937 in a 5–1 defeat against England at Windsor Park. His teammates that day included fellow dual internationalists Tommy Breen, Bill Hayes and Alex Stevenson.

== Honours ==
Cork/Cork City

- FAI Cup: runners up 1936
- Munster Senior Cup: 1939

Cork United

- League of Ireland: 1941, 1942, 1943, 1945, 1946
- FAI Cup: 1942, 1947
- League of Ireland Shield: 1943, 1948
- Munster Senior Cup: 1941, 1945, 1946, 1947
