= Albert Beech =

English footballer (1912–1985)

Personal information
- Full name: Albert Beech
- Date of birth: 24 September 1912
- Place of birth: Fenton, Staffordshire, England
- Date of death: 20 June 1985 (aged 72)
- Place of death: Fenton, Stoke-on-Trent, England
- Height: 5 ft 9 in (1.75 m)
- Position: Inside forward

Youth career
- Leek Alexandra
- Stoke St.Peter's

Senior career*
Years	Team	Apps	(Gls)
1930–1933	Port Vale	1	(0)
1933–1934	Altrincham	35	(14)
1934–1937	Huddersfield Town	22	(4)
1937–1938	Notts County	13	(0)
1938–1939	Northwich Victoria		
Total		71	(17)
- * Club domestic league appearances and goals

Albert Beech (24 September 1912 – 20 June 1985) was an English footballer who played as an inside forward for Port Vale, Altrincham, Huddersfield Town, Notts County, and Northwich Victoria. He played in the First Division with Huddersfield and won the Cheshire Senior Cup with Altrincham.

== Early and personal life ==
Albert Beech was born on 24 September 1912 in Fenton, Staffordshire; he married and later died in Fenton.

== Career ==
Before joining Port Vale in November 1930, Beech played for Leek Alexandra and Stoke St. Peter's. He turned professional in September 1931. He made his only appearance for the club in a 2–1 home defeat to Manchester United on 28 November 1931. He left on a free transfer in May 1933 and moved on to Altrincham. He was the club's top-scorer in the 1933–34 campaign, scoring 24 goals in 49 games, including a hat-trick against Crewe Alexandra Reserves in a 6–2 win on 2 December. He won the Cheshire Senior Cup with the club, as Altrincham beat Congleton Town 1–0 in the final at Edgeley Park. Having proven himself in the Cheshire County League, he was signed by First Division club Huddersfield Town in June 1934, alongside left-back James Taylor. He played three matches in the 1934–35 campaign. He scored four goals in 16 games during the 1935–36 season, with his first goal in the Football League coming on 14 April in a 1–1 draw with Portsmouth. He featured just three times in the 1936–37 season, his final appearance coming in a 5–0 defeat at Middlesbrough on 27 February. He was sold to Notts County for a £1,000 fee in June 1937. He played 13 Third Division South matches in the 1937–38 season. He then returned to Fenton and played for Northwich Victoria before World War II ended his professional career at the age of 27.

== Career statistics ==
Appearances and goals by club, season and competition
Club	Season	League			FA Cup		Other		Total	
Club	Season	Division	Apps	Goals	Apps	Goals	Apps	Goals	Apps	Goals
Port Vale	1931–32	Second Division	1	0	0	0	0	0	1	0
Altrincham	1933–34	Cheshire County League	35	14	8	4	6	6	49	24
Huddersfield Town	1934–35	First Division	3	0	0	0	0	0	3	0
Huddersfield Town	1935–36	First Division	16	4	0	0	0	0	16	4
Huddersfield Town	1936–37	First Division	3	0	0	0	0	0	3	0
Huddersfield Town	Total		22	4	0	0	0	0	22	4
Notts County	1937–38	Third Division South	13	0	0	0	1	0	14	0
Career total			71	18	8	4	7	6	86	28

== Honours ==
Altrincham

- Cheshire Senior Cup: 1934
