= Doug Berrie =

Scottish footballer (1930–2001)

Personal information
- Full name: Douglas Berrie
- Place of birth: Calcutta, India
- Position: Full back

Youth career
- Stobswell

Senior career*
Years	Team	Apps	(Gls)
1946–1953	Dundee United	142	(0)
1953–1964	Forfar Athletic	336	(1)
- * Club domestic league appearances and goals

Doug Berrie was a Scottish footballer who played as a full back for Dundee United and Forfar Athletic. Berrie joined United in 1946 from local side Stobswell, making his debut in December against Cowdenbeath in a Scottish Division B match. Featuring in a number of matches that season, Berrie re-signed for the following campaign, going on to make nearly 142 league appearances before his release in 1953. Joining Forfar, Berrie was granted a testimonial in 1961, which was played against United. Leaving Forfar in 1964, Berrie's son, also Doug, was a schoolboy signing at Tannadice in May 1970 but failed to make a first-team appearance.
