= Edwin Watson (footballer) =

Scottish footballer (1914–1944)

Personal information
- Date of birth: 28 May 1914
- Place of birth: Pittenweem, Scotland
- Date of death: 12 June 1944 (aged 30)
- Place of death: Bay of Biscay, off Brest, German-occupied France
- Position: Forward

Youth career
- Markinch Victoria
- Dunnikier
- Crossgates Primrose

Senior career*
Years	Team	Apps	(Gls)
1936–1937	Partick Thistle		(6)
1937–1938	Huddersfield Town	3	(0)
- Bradford Park Avenue
- * Club domestic league appearances and goals

Edwin Watson (28 May 1914 – 12 June 1944) was a professional footballer, who played for Partick Thistle, Huddersfield Town and Bradford Park Avenue. He was killed in the Second World War. He was born in Pittenweem, Fife, Scotland.

== Military service and death ==
Watson served as a flight sergeant in No. 201 Squadron RAF of the Royal Air Force Volunteer Reserve during the Second World War. He is known to have served on two missions as an air gunner on a Short Sunderland III conducting anti-submarine sweeps from RAF Pembroke Dock over the Bay of Biscay. On 7 June 1944, Watson's Sunderland located U-955 off Cape Ortegal, Spain and sunk it with depth charges, killing all 50 crew on board the U-boat.

Five days later, on 12 June 1944, the Sunderland encountered U-333, and conducted depth charge raids on it. The Sunderland is thought to have been shot down by flak from the submarine's anti-aircraft guns during the attack, killing everybody on board, including Watson. His body was not recovered from the wreckage, and he is remembered on the Runnymede Memorial. In 2021, he was added to the Huddersfield Town 'roll of honour'.
