= Willie Lyon =

English footballer

Personal information
- Full name: William King Lyon
- Date of birth: 7 March 1912
- Place of birth: Birkenhead, England
- Date of death: 5 December 1962 (aged 50)
- Place of death: Salford, England
- Position: Centre-half

Senior career*
Years	Team	Apps	(Gls)
- Clydebank Juniors
- Kirkintilloch Rob Roy
1933–1935	Queens Park	56	(3)
1935–1940	Celtic	146	(16)

International career
1938	Scottish League XI	2	(0)
1940	Scotland (wartime)	1	(0)
- * Club domestic league appearances and goals

William King Lyon (7 March 1912 – 5 December 1962) was a Scottish professional footballer, who played for Queens Park and Celtic.

== Career ==
Lyon began his senior career aged 21 with Queens Park after a spell with Kirkintilloch Rob Roy. He moved to Celtic in 1935. He was a centre-half in the era where that position was changing to an increasingly defensive role, and his attributes in that aspect saw him establish himself in the team ahead of other contenders. He was made captain of Celtic soon after joining the club, and went on to win the Scottish league championship in 1936 and 1938, the Scottish Cup in 1937 and the Empire Exhibition Trophy in 1938, as well as a Glasgow Cup and three Charity Cups.

He was never selected for the full Scotland international team (he was ineligible under rules of the time due to his English birthplace), but was a member of a SFA Touring XI squad which visited Canada and the US in 1939. He had also played twice for the Scottish League XI in 1938.

Lyon served in the Scots Guards during World War II, rising to the rank of major and sustaining a leg injury in 1944 which ended his football career. He was awarded the Military Cross.

His younger brother Tom was also a footballer; the pair were briefly teammates at Celtic when Tom joined as a guest player during the war.
