= John Shiel =

English footballer

Personal information
- Date of birth: 13 May 1917
- Place of birth: Seahouses, England
- Date of death: 30 November 2013 (aged 96)
- Place of death: Ashington, Northumberland, England
- Position: Midfielder

Senior career*
Years	Team	Apps	(Gls)
- North Shields
1936–1938	Newcastle United		
1938–1939	Huddersfield Town	1	(0)
- * Club domestic league appearances and goals

John Shiel (13 May 1917 – 30 November 2013) was an English professional footballer, who played for North Shields, Newcastle United and Huddersfield Town. He was born in Seahouses. At the time of his death in 2013, he was the oldest former Newcastle United player.
