= Duncan Ogilvie =

Scottish footballer

Personal information
- Full name: Duncan Henderson Ogilvie
- Date of birth: 8 October 1911
- Place of birth: Glasgow, Scotland
- Date of death: 6 May 1967 (aged 55)
- Place of death: Blackpool, England
- Height: 5 ft 8 in (1.73 m)
- Position: Outside right

Youth career
- Alva Albion Rangers

Senior career*
Years	Team	Apps	(Gls)
1932–1936	Motherwell	104	(34)
1936	Huddersfield Town	28	(4)
1936–1941	Motherwell	89	(38)
1941–1946	Falkirk	4	(0)
1946–1948	Hamilton Academical	15	(4)
1948–1949	Dundee United	18	(0)

International career
1933	Scotland	1	(0)
- * Club domestic league appearances and goals

Duncan Henderson Ogilvie (8 October 1911 – 6 May 1967) was a Scottish footballer who played as an outside right.

Born in the Shettleston district of Glasgow and raised mostly in Clackmannanshire, Ogilvie began his senior career with Motherwell, newly crowned champions of the Scottish Football League, in 1932. (Note: The MotherWELLnet website states that Duncan Ogilvie made 91 league appearances (35 goals) for Motherwell, with no season breakdown but acknowledging he had two spells at the club; the 'Post War English & Scottish Football League A–Z Player's Database' splits this same total into spells with 19/8 and 72/27. However, this would mean those 19 matches across four years were sufficient to impress Scotland into selecting him, and Huddersfield into signing him. MotherWELLnet lists John Ogilvie as making 105 league appearances (37 goals) between 1933 and 1939, with no breakdown by season, also stating that the two men were brothers which is not the case. The 'Record of Pre-war Scottish League Players' files attribute almost all of these 196 appearances and 72 goals to Duncan (104/34 including 19/8 in 1932–33, and 89/38 including 72/27 between 1937–38 and 1938–39), listing only 3 appearances for John, all in the 1938–39 season. The 'London Hearts Supporters Club' website has details of each opponent who played against Hearts, and this lists Duncan as having played for Motherwell in 9 league matches (plus another 7 in wartime), while listing John as being involved in only one such match in September 1938 (in which Duncan also featured). Further evidence may be required to confirm the accuracy of these figures.) He initially had to wait until the departure of the older Johnny Murdoch to claim a regular place in the side, but quickly made an impact at Fir Park and also soon gained a Scotland cap against Austria in November 1933. In March 1936, Ogilvie moved south to join Huddersfield Town but before the end of the same year returned to Motherwell (where a John Ogilvie was also on the club's books) in a swap deal for Willie MacFadyen. Ogilvie appeared in the 1939 Scottish Cup Final, but the Steelmen lost 4–0 to Clyde.

Like many players, his career was interrupted by the Second World War and he concentrated on his engineering work during this time. Indeed, in 1941, he moved to Falkirk to be closer to his home and remained there until December 1946 (making over 130 appearances, though all but four in unofficial wartime competitions), before spending eighteen months with Hamilton Academical. A final playing season with Dundee United, which saw him playing in defence, followed before his retirement in 1950. During the 1950s, Ogilvie returned to former club Falkirk as a director.

Ogilvie died in May 1967, aged 55.
