= Jack Mahon (footballer, born 1911) =

English footballer and manager

Personal information
- Full name: John Mahon
- Date of birth: 8 December 1911
- Place of birth: Gillingham, Kent, England
- Date of death: 1993 (aged 81–82)
- Place of death: Hull, England
- Height: 5 ft 8 1/2 in (1.74 m)
- Position: Outside right

Youth career
- New Brompton Excelsior
- Doncaster Grammar School

Senior career*
Years	Team	Apps	(Gls)
1928–1929	Doncaster Rovers	0	(0)
1929–1935	Leeds United	78	(20)
1935–1938	West Bromwich Albion	113	(39)
1938–1939	Huddersfield Town	5	(0)
1945–1946	York City		

Managerial career
- 1946–1949: IF Elfsborg
- 1949−1953: IFK Göteborg
- * Club domestic league appearances and goals

John Mahon (born 8 December 1911 – 1993) was a professional footballer who played at outside-right. Born in Gillingham, Kent, he played professionally for Doncaster Rovers, Leeds United, West Bromwich Albion, Huddersfield Town and York City. During World War II he appeared as a guest player for Aldershot, Bradford City, Chelsea, Halifax Town, Leeds United, Millwall, Queens Park Rangers, Reading, Torquay United and West Ham United.
