= Pat Barlow =

Irish footballer

Personal information
- Full name: Patrick Joseph Barlow
- Date of birth: 17 May 1914
- Place of birth: Athlone, Ireland
- Date of death: 11 March 1986 (aged 71)
- Place of death: Dublin, Ireland
- Position: Midfielder

Youth career
- Abbey Villa
- Wanderers
- Pioneers
- Hibernians

Senior career*
Years	Team	Apps	(Gls)
- Athlone Town
1935–1938	Newry Town	18	(2)
1938–1939	Huddersfield Town	7	(1)
1940	Sligo Rovers		
1940–1945	Dundalk	67	(19)
1945–1946	Limerick		
1946–1947	Chelmsford City		
- Wisbech Town
- * Club domestic league appearances and goals

Patrick Joseph Barlow (17 May 1914 – 11 March 1986) was an Irish professional footballer, who played professionally for Newry Town, Huddersfield Town, Sligo Rovers, Dundalk and Limerick. He was born in Athlone, Ireland in 1914 and died in Dublin in 1986.
