= Ronnie Turnbull =

English footballer

Personal information
- Full name: Ronald William Turnbull
- Date of birth: 18 July 1922
- Place of birth: Newbiggin-by-the-Sea, England
- Date of death: 17 November 1966 (aged 44)
- Place of death: Sunderland, England
- Position: Centre forward

Senior career*
Years	Team	Apps	(Gls)
- Jeanfield Swifts
1946–1947	Dundee	26	(27)
1947–1949	Sunderland	40	(16)
1949–1951	Manchester City	30	(5)
1951–1953	Swansea Town	67	(37)
1953–1954	Dundee	16	(5)
- Ashington
- * Club domestic league appearances and goals

Ronnie Turnbull (18 July 1922 – 17 November 1966) was an English footballer who played as a centre forward.

He played junior football in Scotland during the Second World War with Jeanfield Swifts before joining Dundee in 1944. He was transferred to Sunderland for a fee of £10,000 in November 1947, scoring four goals on his debut for the club. He made 40 appearances, scoring 16 goals, before moving on to Manchester City in September 1949. He was then signed by Swansea Town for a fee of £7,500 in January 1951, where he was the club's top goalscorer for two consecutive seasons.

After retiring, he lived and worked in Sunderland. He died in November 1966 after suffering a heart-attack.
