= Johnny Steele =

Scottish footballer and manager

Personal information
- Full name: John Steele
- Date of birth: 24 November 1916
- Place of birth: Glasgow, Scotland
- Date of death: 14 January 2008 (aged 91)
- Place of death: Barnsley, England
- Position: Inside forward

Senior career*
Years	Team	Apps	(Gls)
- Lesmahagow
1934–1935	East Fife	27	(3)
1935–1938	Ayr United	45	(7)
1936–1937	→ Raith Rovers (loan)	16	(10)
1938–1948	Barnsley	49	(21)
Total		137	(41)

Managerial career
- 1960–1971: Barnsley
- 1972–1973: Barnsley
- * Club domestic league appearances and goals

John Steele (24 November 1916 – 14 January 2008) was a Scottish football player and manager.

Steele signed for Barnsley from Ayr United for £2,500 in June 1938. He died of a stroke on 14 January 2008, at the age of 91.

== Managerial stats ==
Updated 27 August 2007.

Team	Nat	From	To	Record				
Team	Nat	From	To	G	W	L	D	Win %
Barnsley	(England)	1 March 1960	1 September 1971	558	196	215	147	35.12
Barnsley	(England)	1 November 1972	1 April 1973	23	6	9	8	26.08
