= Bob Hesford (rugby union) =

England international rugby union player

- Full name: Robert Hesford
- Born: 26 March 1953
- Died: 3 August 2023 (aged 70)
- Height: 6 ft 4 in (193 cm)

Rugby union career
- Position: No. 8
International career
Years	Team	Apps	(Points)
1981–85	England	10	(0)

Robert Hesford (26 March 1953 — 3 August 2023) was an English rugby union international.

== Early life ==
Hesford was born in Luanshya in Zambia, as the eldest of three brothers and a sister. His youngest brother Iain was a professional football goalkeeper, while the middle brother Steve played rugby league for Warrington. Their father Bob Sr was a Huddersfield Town footballer during the 1930s and 1940s. He was educated at Arnold School, Blackpool.

== Rugby ==
Hesford studied at Durham University, where he competed for the university rugby club and was also selected for the British Universities side. Academic commitments at Durham prevented him from joining the Lancashire tour of South Africa and Rhodesia in 1974. He took up a teaching job in London post-graduation and played a season for Wasps. He represented Bristol from 1978.

=== International career ===
A number eight, Hesford gained 10 England caps between 1981 and 1985. Following England's 1985 tour of New Zealand, in which he captained England in a tour win over Otago but was not selected for either Test, he announced his retirement from first-class rugby. He received his England caps while playing for Bristol, a club he went on to coach.

== See also ==
- List of England national rugby union players
