= Sedley Cooper =

English footballer

Personal information
- Date of birth: 17 August 1911
- Place of birth: Garforth, West Riding of Yorkshire, England
- Height: 5 ft 8 in (1.73 m)
- Position: Midfielder

Senior career*
Years	Team	Apps	(Gls)
1928–1931	Halifax Town	79	(?)
1931–1936	Sheffield Wednesday	18	(4)
1936–1937	Huddersfield Town	5	(1)
1937–1939	Notts County	56	(14)
- * Club domestic league appearances and goals

Sedley Cooper (1911 – after 1938) was an English professional footballer, who played for Halifax Town, Sheffield Wednesday, Huddersfield Town and Notts County.
