= Robert Perrett =

English footballer

Personal information
- Full name: Robert Frederick Perrett
- Date of birth: 23 November 1919
- Place of birth: Bournemouth, England
- Date of death: 1994
- Position: Winger

Senior career*
Years	Team	Apps	(Gls)
1937–1938	Bournemouth & Boscombe Athletic	0	(0)
1938–1939	Huddersfield Town	1	(0)
1939–1942	Southampton	0	(0)
- * Club domestic league appearances and goals

Robert Frederick Perrett (23 November 1919 – 1994) was an English professional footballer, who played for Bournemouth & Boscombe Athletic, Huddersfield Town and Southampton.

== Playing career ==
Perrett was born in Bournemouth and started his career with Bournemouth & Boscombe Athletic in 1937, before moving to join Huddersfield for the 1938–39 season, making only one appearance.

He returned to the south coast to join Southampton in time for the 1939–40 season and played in all three of "Saints" matches before the season was abandoned upon the outbreak of World War II. In the few matches he played (at outside left) it was reported that he "combined well" with Ted Bates on his inside.

He made a further 18 appearances in wartime matches (with four goals).
