= Iain Hesford =

English footballer

Personal information
- Date of birth: 4 March 1960
- Place of birth: Ndola, Northern Rhodesia
- Date of death: 18 November 2014 (aged 54)
- Place of death: Lytham St Annes, England
- Height: 6 ft 1 1/2 in (1.87 m)
- Position: Goalkeeper

Senior career*
Years	Team	Apps	(Gls)
1977–1983	Blackpool	202	(0)
1983–1986	Sheffield Wednesday	0	(0)
1985	→ Fulham (loan)	3	(0)
1985	→ Notts County (loan)	10	(0)
1986–1988	Sunderland	97	(0)
1988–1991	Hull City	91	(0)
1991–1992	Maidstone United	42	(1)
1992–1996	Eastern		
1996–1997	Sing Tao		
1997–1998	South China		
Total		448	(1)

International career
1978	England Youth	1	(0)
1981–1982	England U21	7	(0)
- * Club domestic league appearances and goals

Iain Hesford (4 March 1960 – 18 November 2014) was an English professional footballer, who played as a goalkeeper. He is best known for his time at Blackpool, Sunderland, Hull City, and Maidstone United.

== Early career ==
Hesford began his career at Blackpool, where he played more than 200 games and won seven caps for the England Under-21 team. When he made his debut, against Oldham Athletic on 20 August 1977, aged 17, he became the youngest goalkeeper ever to play for Blackpool in a League game. As he ran out for the second half, he offended the Latics support by flashing them a "V" sign. In 1983, he was signed by Sheffield Wednesday, but didn't play a single game for the Owls. In 1986, he moved to Sunderland, where he played for two and a half seasons, before he moved to Hull City in December 1988, in a deal that saw Tony Norman move in the opposite direction. He was part of the Hull side that were relegated from the old Division 2 in 1991. He left the club, whereupon he signed for Maidstone United, who were also struggling at the time. He scored the winner in a 3–2 home win for Maidstone against Hereford United on a windy day in 1991, with a massive drop-kick from his own penalty area.

== Career in Hong Kong ==
Hesford's career in Hong Kong started in July 1992 when he joined Eastern. He played for the club for 4 years before he moved to Sing Tao in 1996–97 season and later South China in 1997–98. During his time at Eastern, the club captured 5 trophies including the Hong Kong Senior Shield, FA Cup and the league championship. He was elected as the best foreign player in the league in 1992. He was also in the HKFDL Team of the Year for three seasons (1992–93, 1993–94 and 1994–95). While at Eastern, he went 827 minutes (over ten games) without conceding a goal, setting a HKFDL record before Loh Wai Chi scored for South China in a second round match.

He played for Hong Kong XI ('Hong Kong Golden Select') against England in a friendly which the visitors won 1–0.

He left Hong Kong in 1998 and started his career as a coach in England. He ran a hotel in Littleborough, near Rochdale, Greater Manchester, England.

== Personal life ==
Iain Hesford was born on 4 March 1960, in Ndola, Northern Rhodesia (now Zambia), to English parents. His father, Bob, was also a professional footballer who played as a goalkeeper. He spent his entire career with Huddersfield Town, notably playing in the 1938 FA Cup final. Hesford's older brothers, Bob Jr and Steve, were also professional athletes. Bob Jr was a rugby union player, even getting capped by England on 10 occasions. Steve, on the other hand, was a rugby league player, featuring almost exclusively for Warrington from the mid-1970s to the mid-1980s. The family spent time in both Northern Rhodesia and Malawi before moving back to England in 1970.

On 20 November 2014, the body of Hesford was discovered. The local newspaper, the Blackpool Gazette, noted a "suspected heart attack".

== Honours ==
Sunderland

- Football League Third Division: 1987–88
