= Jimmy Woodburn =

Scottish footballer (1917–1978)

Personal information
- Full name: James Woodburn
- Date of birth: 29 January 1917
- Place of birth: Rutherglen, Scotland
- Date of death: 2 January 1978 (aged 60)
- Place of death: Leeds, England
- Position: Wing half

Youth career
- Coltness United

Senior career*
| Years | Team | Apps | (Gls) |
| 1938–1948 | Newcastle United | 44 | (4) |
| 1948–1952 | Gateshead | 131 | (10) |
| 1952–19?? | Consett | ? | (?) |
- * Club domestic league appearances and goals

James Woodburn (29 January 1917 – 2 January 1978) was a Scottish footballer who played as a wing half.

Woodburn played in The Football League for Newcastle United and Gateshead between 1938 and 1952 (with short guest periods at several Scottish and English clubs during World War II), before a spell at North Eastern League side Consett.

Woodburn died in Leeds on 2 January 1978, at the age of 60.

== Sources ==
- "JIMMY WOODBURN". Post War English & Scottish Football League A–Z Player's Transfer Database.
- "Jimmy Woodburn". English National Football Archive.
