= Jim Spedding =

English footballer

Personal information
- Full name: John James Spedding
- Date of birth: 1 October 1912
- Place of birth: Keighley, England
- Date of death: 1982 (aged 69–70)
- Place of death: Connah's Quay, Wales
- Height: 5 ft 9 in (1.75 m)
- Position: Right half

Senior career*
Years	Team	Apps	(Gls)
- Rosehill Villa
1933–1936	Gateshead	88	(14)
1936–1937	Huddersfield Town	4	(0)
1937–1939	Chesterfield	19	(1)
1939	Darlington		
- Worksop Town
- * Club domestic league appearances and goals

John James Spedding (1 October 1912 – December 1982) was an English professional footballer who played in the Football League as a right half for Gateshead, Huddersfield Town and Chesterfield. He also played three games, scoring once, for Darlington before the 1939–40 season was abandoned because of the Second World War. He was born in Keighley, Yorkshire, and died in Connah's Quay, Flintshire, Wales.

== Personal information ==
He was married in 1945 to Hilda Swain (1917-2008) and lived in Cheshire until his death in 1982. They had four daughters.
