= Archibald Hastie =

Scottish footballer

Personal information
- Full name: Archibald Hastie
- Date of birth: 1915
- Place of birth: Shotts, Scotland
- Date of death: 1988 (aged 72–73)
- Place of death: Bradford, England
- Height: 5 ft 10 in (1.78 m)
- Position: Inside forward

Senior career*
Years	Team	Apps	(Gls)
- Douglas Water Thistle
1933–1937	Partick Thistle	58	(19)
1936–1937	Huddersfield Town	13	(1)
1937–1938	Motherwell	9	(3)
1938–1948	Bradford City	31	(9)
- Selby Town
- * Club domestic league appearances and goals

Archibald Hastie (1915–1988) was a Scottish professional footballer who played for Partick Thistle, Huddersfield Town and Motherwell.

He played for Bradford City between 1938 and 1945, scoring nine goals in 31 official appearances, in a career interrupted by the Second World War, during which he served in the Royal Navy; he later also coached the club.
