= Jock Wightman =

Scottish footballer

Personal information
- Full name: John Renton Wightman
- Date of birth: 2 November 1912
- Place of birth: Duns, Scotland
- Date of death: 20 April 1964 (aged 51)
- Place of death: Blackburn, England
- Position: Wing half

Senior career*
Years	Team	Apps	(Gls)
????–1933	Scarborough		
1933–1934	York City	5	(0)
1934	Bradford Park Avenue	17	(0)
1934–1937	Huddersfield Town	64	(0)
1937–1946	Blackburn Rovers	66	(2)
1946–1947	Carlisle United	36	(0)
- * Club domestic league appearances and goals

John Renton Wightman (2 November 1912 – 20 April 1964) was a Scottish footballer who played for Scarborough, York City, Bradford Park Avenue, Huddersfield Town, Blackburn Rovers and Carlisle United. He was born in Duns. He died on 20 April 1964 in Blackburn, Lancashire.
