= Robert Gordon (English footballer) =

English footballer

Personal information
- Full name: Robert Henry Gordon
- Date of birth: 14 September, 1917
- Place of birth: Shankhouse, Northumberland, England
- Date of death: 18 September 1940 (aged 22–23)
- Place of death: Ely, Cambridgeshire, England
- Position: Defender

Senior career*
| Years | Team | Apps | (Gls) |
| 1937–1939 | Huddersfield Town | 7 | (0) |
- * Club domestic league appearances and goals

Robert Henry Gordon (1917 – 18 September 1940) was a professional footballer, who played for Huddersfield Town.

He also made a solitary 'guest' appearance for Mossley in the 1939–40 season.

He died in September 1940 of pulmonary tuberculosis at RAF Hospital Ely in World War II whilst serving as a Leading Aircraftman of the Royal Air Force Volunteer Reserve in No 9 Sqn, RAF.
