= Tom Hinchcliffe =

English footballer (1913–1978)

Tom Hinchliffe
Personal information
- Full name: Thomas Hinchliffe
- Date of birth: 6 December 1913
- Place of birth: Denaby Main, England
- Date of death: 1978 (aged 64–65)
- Height: 5 ft 10 in (1.78 m)
- Position: Forward

Senior career*
Years	Team	Apps	(Gls)
1933–1936	Grimsby Town	27	(5)
1936–1937	Huddersfield Town	13	(4)
1937–1939	Derby County	13	(3)
1946	Nottingham Forest	1	(0)
- * Club domestic league appearances and goals

Thomas Hinchliffe (6 December 1913 – 1978) was a professional footballer, who played for Grimsby Town, Huddersfield Town and Derby County. He was born in Denaby, near Conisbrough, Yorkshire.
