= Jack O'Reilly (association footballer) =

Irish footballer

Personal information
- Full name: John O'Reilly
- Date of birth: 7 May 1914
- Place of birth: Cobh, Ireland
- Height: 5 ft 10 in (1.78 m)
- Position: Outside right

Youth career
- 1934: Cobh Ramblers

Senior career*
Years	Team	Apps	(Gls)
1935–1936	Cork	?	(?)
1936–1939	Norwich City	33	(11)
1939–1948	Cork United	?	(?)
1948–1950	Cork Athletic	?	(?)

International career
1943–1955	League of Ireland XI	5	(0)
1946	Ireland	2	(1)
- * Club domestic league appearances and goals

Jack O'Reilly (born 7 May 1914, date of death unknown) was an Irish footballer. He was born in Queenstown.

He joined Cork in 1935 as an outside right. The following year he was a runner up in the FAI Cup Final to Shamrock Rovers. However shortly afterwards he became embroiled in controversy when it emerged that, together with Owen Madden, he had signed for Norwich City before playing in the cup final on 19 April. When Cork F.C., who received no fee, protested over the moves, both O'Reilly and Madden were suspended by the FAI for three years.

Although he scored twice on his Norwich debut he was never a regular and returned to Cork in 1939 where he went on to win six League of Ireland championships and 2 FAI Cups. Played in a total of 5 Cup Finals scoring seven times. Scored twice in the 1941 FAI Cup final.

He won his two senior caps for Ireland in the space of a week in 1946. He scored on his debut on 16 June in a 3-1 defeat to Portugal and seven days later won his only other cap in a 1-0 win over Spain in Madrid. After retiring from the game, O'Reilly emigrated to Canada.

== Honours ==
- League of Ireland: 6
  - Cork United 1940/41, 1941/42, 1942/43, 1944/45, 1945/46
  - Cork Athletic 1949/50
- FAI Cup: 2
  - Cork United 1941, 1947

== Sources ==
- Details of Spain v Ireland 23/6/1946
- Details of Portugal v Ireland 16/6/1946
- The Complete Who's Who of Irish International Football, 1945-96 (1996):Stephen McGarrigle [2]
- The Boys In Green - The FAI International Story (1997): Sean Ryan
