= John Yuill (footballer) =

Scottish footballer (born 1915)

Personal information
- Full name: John Yuill
- Date of birth: 1915
- Place of birth: Coltness, Scotland
- Position: Midfielder

Senior career*
Years	Team	Apps	(Gls)
1935–1936	Huddersfield Town	1	(0)
- Cheltenham Town
- Arbroath
- * Club domestic league appearances and goals

John Yuill (born 1915, date of death unknown) was a professional footballer, who played for Huddersfield Town, Cheltenham Town and Arbroath. Yuill is deceased.

== Sources ==
- Hodgson, Alan; Huddersfield Town AFC (2007). 99 years & counting : stats and stories, 1908-2008 : Huddersfield Town A.F.C. centenary history. Huddersfield: Huddersfield Town A.F.C. ISBN 978-0-9557281-0-5. OCLC 618709050.
