= Lewis Brook =

English footballer

Personal information
- Full name: Lewis Brook
- Date of birth: 27 July 1918
- Place of birth: Halifax, England
- Date of death: 1996 (aged 77–78)
- Position: Defender

Senior career*
Years	Team	Apps	(Gls)
?	Halifax Town	?	(?)
1937–1947	Huddersfield Town	18	(6)
1947–1957	Oldham Athletic	189	(14)
- * Club domestic league appearances and goals

Lewis Brook (27 July 1918 – 1996) was a professional footballer who played as a defender for Halifax Town, Huddersfield Town & Oldham Athletic. He grew up in Northowram, near Halifax in the West Riding of Yorkshire.
