= George Wienand =

South African soccer player (1910–1993)

Personal information
- Full name: George Victor Wienand
- Date of birth: 27 April 1910
- Place of birth: East London, South Africa
- Date of death: 1 December 1993 (aged 83)
- Place of death: East London, South Africa
- Position: Outside right

Senior career*
Years	Team	Apps	(Gls)
1937–1938	Huddersfield Town	28	(3)
1938–1939	Hull City	15	(3)
- * Club domestic league appearances and goals

George Victor "Tolley" Wienand (7 April 1910 – 1 December 1993) was a professional footballer, who played for Huddersfield Town and Hull City.

He was born in East London, Eastern Cape, South Africa. He also played in eighteen first-class cricket matches from 1934/35 to 1953/54.
