= Alf Lythgoe =

English footballer and manager

Personal information
- Date of birth: 16 March 1907
- Place of birth: Nantwich, England
- Date of death: 17 April 1967 (aged 60)
- Position: Forward

Senior career*
Years	Team	Apps	(Gls)
1932–1934	Stockport County	69	(80)
1934–1938	Huddersfield Town	72	(42)
1938–1939	Stockport County	50	(24)
Total		191	(146)

Managerial career
- 1953–1955: Altrincham
- * Club domestic league appearances and goals

Alfred Peter Lythgoe (16 March 1907 – 17 April 1967) was an English professional footballer who played as a forward for Stockport County and Huddersfield Town in the 1930s, before becoming manager of Altrincham in 1953.

== Career ==
Lythgoe began his career with Crewe Alexandra but was released by the club after they deemed him too small. He moved into non-league football with spells at Whitchurch, Congleton and Sandbach before he attracted the attention of Division Three North side Stockport County while playing for Ashton National in 1931-32 where he scored 38 goals in 37 appearances, including four on his debut against Nantwich Town. He returned to National Park in 1939, scoring six goals in three appearances in the curtailed Cheshire League season, and 23 goals in 21 matches in the wartime 1939-40 campaign, winning a Manchester County FA Shield medal.

Lythgoe also made one wartime appearance for Hyde United, scoring in a 1–0 home defeat of Droylsden in the Cheshire League East Division on 13 April 1940.

After scoring 19 goals in his first season, the following year Lythgoe scored 46 goals in 39 league games, which is still a club record, including three consecutive hat-tricks in matches against Southport, Darlington and Wrexham and, after starting the 1934–35 season in similar fashion, Huddersfield Town paid £3,500 to take him to Leeds Road in October 1934. He later returned to Stockport in 1938 where he finished his playing career.

He died on 17 April 1967, aged 60.
