= Jimmy Isaac =

English footballer

Personal information
- Full name: James Isaac
- Date of birth: 23 October 1916
- Place of birth: Cramlington, England
- Date of death: December 1993 (aged 77)
- Place of death: England
- Position: Striker

Senior career*
Years	Team	Apps	(Gls)
1936–1939	Huddersfield Town	33	(8)
1946–1947	Bradford City	24	(3)
1947–1949	Hartlepools United	56	(9)
- * Club domestic league appearances and goals

James Isaac (23 October 1916 – December 1993) was a professional footballer, who played for Huddersfield Town, Bradford City and Hartlepools United. He was born in Cramlington, Northumberland.

== Honours ==
Huddersfield Town

- FA Cup runner-up: 1937–38
