= Bill Hayes (footballer, born 1915) =

Irish footballer (1915–1987)

Personal information
- Full name: William Edward Hayes
- Date of birth: 7 November 1915
- Place of birth: Cork, Ireland
- Date of death: 22 April 1987 (aged 71)
- Place of death: Blackburn, England
- Height: 5 ft 8 in (1.73 m)
- Position: Defender

Youth career
- 19xx–1934: St Vincent's (Sheffield)

Senior career*
| Years | Team | Apps | (Gls) |
| 1934–1940 | Huddersfield Town | 72 | (5) |
| | → (wartime league) | 21 | (0) |
| 1940–1946 | Cork United | | |
| 1946–1950 | Huddersfield Town | 112 | (0) |
| 1950–1952 | Burnley | 12 | (0) |

International career
- England Schoolboys
| 1937–1938 | Ireland (IFA) | 4 | (0) |
| 1946–1947 | Ireland (FAI) | 2 | (0) |
| | League of Ireland XI | 2 | (0) |
- * Club domestic league appearances and goals

William Edward Hayes (7 November 1915 – 22 April 1987) was an Irish footballer who played for Huddersfield Town, Cork United and Burnley. As an international, Hayes played for both Ireland teams – the FAI XI and the IFA XI. Like fellow dual international, Billy Walsh, he also represented England Schoolboys. Another William Hayes also played for Ireland during the 1940s.

== Club career ==
=== Huddersfield Town ===
Hayes moved to England as a youth and played junior football in the Sheffield area before being spotted by Huddersfield Town as a teenager. In two spells with Town, either side of the Second World War, he made 184 league appearances and scored 5 league goals. He also made 21 wartime league appearances for the club during the 1939–40 season. Hayes won all six of his senior international caps while playing for Town.

=== Cork United ===
During the Second World War, Hayes returned to Cork where he played for a very successful Cork United team. His United teammates included, among others, Jack O'Reilly, Florrie Burke, Owen Madden, Jackie O'Driscoll, Frank O'Farrell and Tommy Moroney. Hayes helped United win five League of Ireland titles and in 1942 they won an FAI Cup / League double. While with the club he also represented the League of Ireland XI on two occasions.

=== Burnley F.C. ===
In February 1950 Hayes left Huddersfield Town and signed for Burnley. He made his debut for Burnley on 18 February 1950 in a home game against Chelsea. He played his final game for the club on 20 January 1951 against Newcastle United. After making just 12 league appearances he was released in May 1952.

== Irish international ==
When Hayes began his international career in 1937 there were, in effect, two Ireland teams, chosen by two rival associations. Both associations, the Northern Ireland – based IFA and the Irish Free State – based FAI claimed jurisdiction over the whole of Ireland and selected players from the whole island. As a result, several notable Irish players from this era, including Hayes, played for both teams.

=== IFA XI ===
In 1937 and 1938 Hayes made 4 appearances for the IFA XI. He made his international debut on 23 October 1937 in a 5–1 defeat against England. He then helped the IFA XI earn a 1–1 draw with Scotland on 10 November 1937. He played again against Scotland in 1938 before making his final appearance for the IFA XI in a 7–0 defeat against England on 16 November 1938.

=== FAI XI ===
In 1938 Hayes missed out on two opportunities to play for the FAI XI. He was initially called up to play against Switzerland on 18 September. However Huddersfield Town were unable to release him as they not only had a game the day before but also the day after. He was then called up again to play against Poland on 13 November. However this time Hayes found himself in the same predicament as Tommy Breen had a year earlier. He had also been called up by the IFA to play against England on 16 November and, like Breen, he chose to withdraw from the FAI selection.

Hayes eventually made 2 appearances for the FAI XI in 1946 and 1947. On 30 September 1946 he was a member of the first ever FAI XI to play against England. Hayes was injured during the game and was reduced to the role of a limping passenger. Despite a credible performance, the FAI XI lost 1–0. He made his second and last appearance for the FAI XI on 4 May 1947 in a 2–0 defeat against Portugal. During this game Hayes missed a penalty, shooting yards wide just after half-time.

== Honours ==
Cork United

- League of Ireland: 1941, 1942, 1943, 1945, 1946
- FAI Cup: 1942
- League of Ireland Shield: 1943
- Munster Senior Cup: 1941, 1945, 1946
