= Jack Johnson (English footballer) =

English footballer

Personal information
- Full name: John William Johnson
- Date of birth: 12 February 1919
- Place of birth: Newcastle upon Tyne, England
- Date of death: 1975 (aged 55–56)
- Place of death: England
- Position: Midfielder

Senior career*
Years	Team	Apps	(Gls)
1936–1939	Huddersfield Town	18	(2)
1946–1948	Grimsby Town	44	(3)
- Shrewsbury Town
- * Club domestic league appearances and goals

John William Johnson (12 February 1919 – 1975) was an English professional footballer, who played for Huddersfield Town, Grimsby Town and Shrewsbury Town. He was born in Newcastle upon Tyne, Northumberland.
