= Frank Chivers =

English footballer

Personal information
- Full name: Francis Cornelius Chivers
- Date of birth: 7 April 1909
- Place of birth: Drybrook, Gloucestershire, England
- Date of death: 2 April 1942 (aged 32)
- Place of death: Barnborough Main Colliery, Yorkshire, England
- Position: Striker

Senior career*
Years	Team	Apps	(Gls)
?	Barnsley	?	(?)
1936–1938	Huddersfield Town	50	(16)
1938-1942	Blackburn Rovers	48	(2)
- * Club domestic league appearances and goals

Francis Cornelius Chivers (7 April 1909 – 2 April 1942) was a professional footballer, who played for Barnsley, Huddersfield Town and Blackburn Rovers.

He was killed in a mining accident in April 1942.
