= Willie MacFadyen =

Scottish footballer and manager

Personal information
- Date of birth: 23 June 1904
- Place of birth: Overtown, Scotland
- Date of death: 20 January 1971 (aged 66)
- Place of death: Birmingham, England
- Height: 1.73 m (5 ft 8 in)
- Position: Centre forward

Youth career
- Wishaw YMCA

Senior career*
| Years | Team | Apps | (Gls) |
| 1921–1936 | Motherwell | 378 | (235) |
| 1922 | → Bo'ness (loan) | 5 | (0) |
| 1923–1924 | → Clyde (loan) | 27 | (7) |
| 1936–1938 | Huddersfield Town | 48 | (18) |
- Clapton Orient
| Total | | 458 | (260) |

International career
| 1933 | Scotland | 2 | (2) |
| 1934 | Scottish League XI | 1 | (2) |

Managerial career
- 1945–1954: Dundee United
- * Club domestic league appearances and goals

William MacFadyen (23 June 1904 – 20 January 1971) was a Scottish football player and manager. A goalscoring centre forward, his 52 league goals for Motherwell's 1931–32 championship winning side remains the record goals total for a single season in Scottish League history. He also topped the scoring charts again the following season, netting 45 times in 38 games (0 penalties). In total, he scored 251 league goals for Motherwell – the eighth-best top flight total in Scottish League history.

== Playing career ==
Born in Overtown, Lanarkshire, MacFadyen played junior football for Wishaw YMCA before beginning his Motherwell career in 1921. Before establishing himself at Fir Park, he spent periods on loan with Bo'ness and Clyde. As well as the 1932 league title, he gained two Scottish Cup runners-up medals while at Motherwell, in 1931 and 1933. He appeared for Scotland twice during 1933, against Wales and Austria. Despite scoring in both matches, he wasn't selected for international duty again, although he did also represent the Scottish League against the Irish League in 1934, scoring twice.

After leaving Motherwell, he played for Huddersfield Town, for whom he appeared in the 1938 FA Cup Final, and Clapton Orient. In the 1939–40 season he appeared for Mossley making 16 appearances and scoring three goals. During the Second World War, he served in the Royal Air Force and was a guest player for Blackpool, Huddersfield, Nottingham Forest and Rochdale.

== Management and later life ==
In October 1945, MacFadyen was appointed as secretary-manager of Dundee United, a position he would hold for nine years. While he led the club to a memorable Scottish Cup giant killing against Celtic in 1949, he also oversaw United's record defeat when they lost 12–1 against the team where MacFadyen had been idolised as a player, Motherwell. He resigned from his post not long afterwards, in August 1954.

The Dundee United job was to be his last in football. After leaving the game, he worked as a physiotherapist and chiropodist. MacFadyen died in 1971.

His son Ian was also a footballer who played for Dundee United's reserve side while his father was manager, then moved to Motherwell around the time Willie also left the club, returning to Tannadice for one season in 1959.

On 27 September 2022, it was announced that MacFadyen was to be inducted into the Motherwell F.C. Hall of Fame.

== Honours ==
=== Player ===
Motherwell

- Scottish League: 1931–32
- Scottish Cup runner-up: 1930–31, 1932–33

Huddersfield Town

- FA Cup runner-up: 1937–38

== See also ==
- List of Dundee United F.C. managers
- List of footballers in Scotland by number of league goals (200+)
- List of Huddersfield Town A.F.C. players
- List of Motherwell F.C. players
- List of Scotland international footballers (2–3 caps)
