= Andy McCall (footballer, born 1911) =

Scottish footballer and manager

Personal information
- Full name: Andrew Johnstone McCall
- Date of birth: 12 October 1911
- Place of birth: Cumnock, Scotland
- Date of death: 5 November 1979 (aged 68)
- Place of death: Perth, Scotland
- Height: 5 ft 9 1/2 in (1.77 m)
- Positions: Inside forward; wing half

Senior career*
| Years | Team | Apps | (Gls) |
- Cumnock Juniors
| 1928–1936 | Ayr United | 228 | (31) |
| 1936–1938 | St Johnstone | 117 | (80) |
| 1938–1939 | Huddersfield Town | 5 | (0) |
| 1939–1944 | Nottingham Forest | 0 | (0) |
| 1944–1946 | Dundee | 0 | (0) |

Managerial career
- 1958–59: Dundee United
- * Club domestic league appearances and goals

Andrew Johnstone McCall (12 October 1911 – 5 November 1979) was a Scottish football player and manager.

== Career ==
Andy McCall played for Ayr United, St Johnstone, Huddersfield Town, Nottingham Forest and Dundee and was later a coach at Dens Park for several years. McCall was appointed Dundee United manager in October 1958, following the resignation of Tommy Gray. Under his charge, United dropped to third bottom of Division Two and McCall resigned at the end of the season after six months in charge.
