= Tommy Gray (footballer) =

Scottish footballer and manager

Personal information
- Full name: Thomas Davidson Gray
- Date of birth: 21 August 1913
- Place of birth: Newtyle, Scotland
- Date of death: 1992 (age 79)
- Place of death: Dundee, Scotland
- Position: Centre half

Youth career
- Morton

Senior career*
Years	Team	Apps	(Gls)
1946–1949	Dundee	46	(0)
1949–1955	Arbroath	137	(7)

Managerial career
- 1955–1957: Arbroath
- 1957–1958: Dundee United
- * Club domestic league appearances and goals

Thomas Gray (1913–1992) was a Scottish footballer and manager.

== Career ==
Gray, a former Dundee player, became Dundee United's third manager in the space of eight weeks when he was appointed in March 1957. At the time he was the part-time manager of Arbroath, then several places above United in Division Two. On being invited by United to take over as manager, he undertook to accept only if he was allowed to do it on a part-time basis. The arrangement was not a success and in October 1958, after eighteen months, Gray resigned. Gray later became a part-time scout for Rangers.
