= Bob Hesford (footballer) =

English footballer

Personal information
- Full name: Robert Taylor Hesford
- Date of birth: 13 April 1916
- Place of birth: Bolton, England
- Date of death: 15 June 1982 (aged 66)
- Position: Goalkeeper

Senior career*
Years	Team	Apps	(Gls)
1934–1949	Huddersfield Town	203	(0)
- Stalybridge Celtic
- * Club domestic league appearances and goals

Robert Taylor Hesford (13 April 1916 – 15 June 1982) was an English professional footballer who played all his professional career as a goalkeeper for Huddersfield Town.

== Biography ==
Hesford was born in Bolton. In 1950, Robert was teaching at Spring Grove Junior school in Huddersfield.. He was praised for his sportsmanship and skill in saving a penalty that was retaken at Old Trafford against Manchester United by J.P.W. Mallalieu in the Sporting Manners chapter of his book, Sporting Days

== Family ==
Three of Hesford's sons had successful sporting careers. Bob Hesford was an England rugby union international; Steve Hesford played rugby league for Warrington; and Iain Hesford was a goalkeeper like his father, playing for Blackpool and Sunderland amongst a number of clubs.

== Honours ==
Huddersfield Town

- FA Cup runner-up: 1937–38
