= 1932 FA Charity Shield =

- Event: FA Charity Shield
Newcastle United	Everton
3	5
- Date: 12 October 1932
- Venue: St James' Park, Newcastle
- Attendance: 10,000

The 1932 FA Charity Shield was the 19th FA Charity Shield, a football match between the winners of the previous season's First Division and FA Cup competitions. The match was contested by league champions Everton and FA Cup winners Newcastle, and was played at St James' Park, the home ground of Newcastle United. Everton won the game, 5–3.

== Match details ==
12 October 1932

Newcastle United	3–5	Everton
McMenemy ?', ?'; Boyd		Dean 22', 45', 47', 88'; Johnson

St James' Park, Newcastle
Attendance: 10,000

Newcastle United
Everton

GK	Mick Burns
RB	Jimmy Nelson (c)
LB	David Fairhurst
RH	Dave Bell
CH	Dave Davidson
LH	Sam Weaver
RW	Jimmy Boyd
IR	Jimmy Richardson
CF	Jack Allen
IL	Harry McMenemy
LW	Tommy Lang
Manager: Andy Cunningham

GK	Ted Sagar
RB	Ben Williams
LB	Warney Cresswell
RH	Cliff Britton
CH	Tommy White
LH	Jock Thomson
RW	Edward Critchley
IR	John McGourty
CF	Dixie Dean (c)
IL	Tommy Johnson
LW	Jimmy Stein
Manager: Thomas H. McIntosh
