= McMenemy =

McMenemy is a surname. Notable people with the surname include:

- Dorian McMenemy (born 1996), Dominican Republic swimmer
- Frank McMenemy (1910–1976), Scottish footballer
- Harry McMenemy (1912–1997), Scottish footballer
- Jimmy McMenemy (1880–1965), Scottish footballer
- John McMenemy (1908–1983), Scottish footballer
- Lawrie McMenemy (born 1936), English footballer and manager
- Neil McMenemy (born 1967), Scottish triple jumper
- Shayne McMenemy (born 1976), Australian rugby league player
- Simon McMenemy (born 1977), English football manager
- Mackenzie McMenemy (born 2008), British musician
