= David Fairhurst =

English footballer (1906–1972)

Personal information
- Full name: David Liddle Fairhurst
- Date of birth: 20 July 1906
- Place of birth: Blyth, Northumberland, England
- Date of death: 26 October 1972 (aged 66)
- Height: 5 ft 7 1/2 in (1.71 m)
- Position: Left back

Youth career
- New Delaval Villa

Senior career*
Years	Team	Apps	(Gls)
19??–1927	Blyth Spartans	?	(?)
1927–1929	Walsall	56	(0)
1929–1946	Newcastle United	266	(2)

International career
1933	England	1	(0)
- * Club domestic league appearances and goals

David Liddle Fairhurst (20 July 1906 – 26 October 1972) was an English professional footballer, who played most of his career, as a left back, with Newcastle United, who he helped win the FA Cup in 1932. He also made one appearance for England in 1933.

== Career ==
Fairhurst was born in Blyth, Northumberland and started his football career at Blyth Spartans before being signed by Jimmy Torrance for Walsall in June 1927. After two seasons playing for Walsall in the Third Division South he was signed by First Division Newcastle United for a fee of £1750 in March 1929.

At Newcastle, Fairhurst was a consistent performer and gave the club over a decade of stout service. He took a while to get into the first team, and although he made his debut in a 2–1 victory at Derby County on 27 April 1929 his next appearance was not until December, when he displaced Scottish international Bob Thomson. From then on, Fairhurst was the first choice left-back for several seasons.

He was an ever-present in the successful FA Cup campaign in 1932, in which Newcastle defeated Arsenal in the final in rather controversial circumstances. Arsenal took an early lead, when Joe Hulme beat Fairhurst and centred the ball to Bob John who easily beat goalkeeper Albert McInroy. Newcastle's equaliser came after a long ball had appeared to go over the goal line, and out for a goal kick; Newcastle winger Jimmy Richardson nevertheless crossed the ball back into play and Jack Allen levelled the match for the Magpies. The referee ruled that the ball had not gone out of play, even though photographic evidence later showed that the ball had actually crossed the line, and the goal stood. Allen scored again in the second half to win the match 2–1.

The following year, Fairhurst became an international when he won his solitary England cap in the friendly against France on 6 December 1933 at White Hart Lane which England won 4–1, with two goals from George Camsell.

For Newcastle, Fairhurst was ever-present in 1932–33 and only missed two matches in the following season, which ended in Newcastle being relegated to Division Two. Fairhurst continued to be a first choice regular for the next few seasons, but the Second World War brought his career to an end, although he did not officially announce his retirement until May 1946.

In his Newcastle career, he made a total of 285 appearances, scoring twice. Both goals came in a 5–1 victory over Nottingham Forest on 30 November 1935.

== Career after football ==
Fairhurst joined Birmingham City in 1946 as trainer and then as physiotherapist in 1950. He was still at Birmingham when he died at age 66

== Family ==
Fairhurst came from a sporting family and his elder brother, Billy Fairhurst, was a full-back with various teams in the 1930s including Nelson and Hartlepools United.

== Honours ==
Newcastle United

- FA Cup: 1931–32
