= Tyne–Wear derby =

Long-standing English football rivalry

- Typical Newcastle United and Sunderland kits.
- Other names: Tyne–Wear derby North East derby
- Location: Tyne and Wear
- Teams: Sunderland; Newcastle United
- First meeting: 10 November 1888; FA Cup; Sunderland 2–0 Newcastle East End
- Latest meeting: 22 March 2026; Premier League; Newcastle United 1–2 Sunderland
- Next meeting: 5 December 2026; Premier League; Newcastle United v Sunderland
- Stadiums: Newcastle: St. James' Park; Sunderland: Stadium of Light

Statistics
- Total meetings: 159
- Most wins: Sunderland (55)
- Most player appearances: Jimmy Lawrence, Newcastle (27)
- Top scorer: George Holley, Sunderland (15)
- All-time series: Newcastle: 54; Draws: 50; Sunderland: 55
- Largest victory: Newcastle United 1–9 Sunderland; 1908–09 First Division (5 December 1908)
- Location of the two teams' stadia 16 km apart in Tyne and Wear

The Tyne–Wear derby, also known as the Wear–Tyne derby or the North East derby, is a local derby between the association football clubs Sunderland and Newcastle United. The derby is an inter-city rivalry in North East England with the two cities of Sunderland and Newcastle upon Tyne almost contiguous. The two stadiums are just 10 miles (16 km) apart. Sunderland play their home matches at the Stadium of Light whilst Newcastle play their home matches at St. James’ Park. The first meeting of the two sides took place in 1883, with the first competitive fixture being an FA Cup tie in 1888 which Sunderland won 2–0 over Newcastle East End.

The statistical balance between the sides is even: to date, having played 159 times in their history (excluding friendlies), Sunderland lead by 55 wins to Newcastle's 54 and 50 draws; (see summary of results for breakdown).

== History ==
=== Rivalry beyond football ===
The history of the Tyne–Wear derby is a modern-day extension of a rivalry between Sunderland and Newcastle that dates back to the English Civil War when protestations over advantages that merchants in Royalist Newcastle had over their Wearside counterparts led to Sunderland becoming a Parliamentarian stronghold.

Sunderland and Newcastle again found themselves on opposite sides during the Jacobite risings, with Newcastle in support of the Hanoverians with the German King George, and Sunderland siding with the Scottish Stuarts.

=== Football rivalry ===
Prior to the beginning of the twentieth century, the main rivalries in Sunderland and Newcastle were cross-town affairs. In Newcastle a rivalry existed during the 1880s between Newcastle East End (later to become Newcastle United) and Newcastle West End, which was ended with West End's bankruptcy in 1892. Meanwhile, on Wearside, a group of players broke away from Sunderland and formed the rival Sunderland Albion in 1888, though Albion was forced to fold four years later. The first meeting between the two took place in 1883, with the first competitive fixture an FA Cup tie in November 1887; Sunderland won 2–0.

Around the turn of the 20th century, the rivalry began to emerge. The 1901 Good Friday encounter, late in the 1900–01 season at St. James' Park had to be abandoned as up to 120,000 fans made their way into a ground which then had a capacity of 30,000. The news was met with anger and rioting followed, with a number of fans injured. However, in general, although the derby attracted big crowds – with fans often climbing trees and buildings for views of the game – there is little evidence to suggest any animosity between the two sets of supporters in the pre-war and immediate post-war period. On 5 December 1908, Sunderland beat Newcastle 9–1 at St. James' Park; despite this, Newcastle still won the league title that season finishing nine points ahead of their local rivals who finished 3rd. The result remains the biggest ever win in a Tyne–Wear derby, as well as the Wearsiders' biggest ever win away from home and Newcastle's biggest ever home league defeat. Newcastle's largest victory margin in a derby is 6–1, which they have achieved twice – at home in 1920 and away in 1955.

In 1979, Sunderland won 4–1 at Newcastle, with Gary Rowell (who was born in Sunderland, County Durham) scoring a hat-trick. On New Year's Day 1985, Newcastle-born Peter Beardsley scored a hat trick in Newcastle's 3–1 victory in the fixture.

Side-by-side comparison of Newcastle's and Sunderland's final league positions 1891 to the present

In 1990, the sides met in a Second Division play off semi final dubbed 'the biggest Tyne–Wear derby in history'. The first leg at Roker Park ended goalless after Sunderland missed a penalty; however they then won the second leg 2–0 at St. James' Park. Towards the end of the second leg, some Newcastle fans invaded the pitch in the hope of forcing an abandonment. However, the game was resumed and Sunderland completed the win. Sunderland went on to lose the final to Swindon Town, but were still promoted due to financial irregularities at Swindon.

In a memorable derby on 25 August 1999, Newcastle manager Ruud Gullit dropped leading scorers Alan Shearer and Duncan Ferguson to the bench. Sunderland went on to win 2–1 at St. James' Park thanks to goals from Kevin Phillips and Niall Quinn, and in the face of outrage from Newcastle fans, Gullit quit before their next match. Sunderland repeated the feat a year later, in a match remembered for Sunderland goalkeeper Thomas Sørensen saving a Shearer penalty.

==== 21st century ====
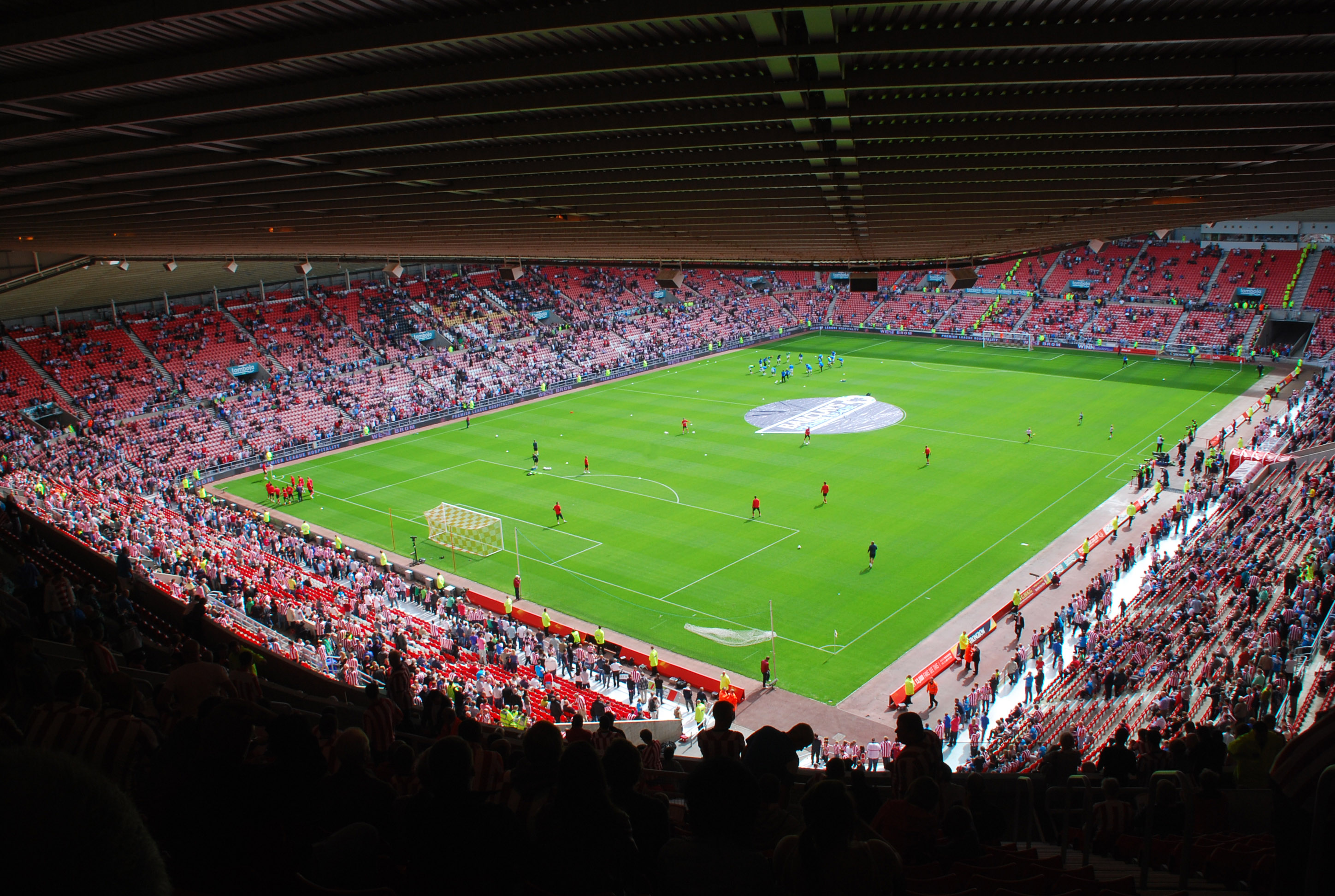
Players warm up at the Stadium of Light ahead of the derby game.

In an eventful derby on 17 April 2006, Newcastle came from 1–0 down at half time to beat Sunderland 4–1 at the Stadium of Light. One of Newcastle's scorers that day, Michael Chopra, later joined Sunderland and played in three derbies against Newcastle. On 25 October 2008, Sunderland beat Newcastle 2–1 at the Stadium of Light, their first home win in a derby for 28 years.

On 31 October 2010 Newcastle beat Sunderland, who played with ten men for over 37 minutes, 5–1 at home, with their captain Kevin Nolan scoring a hat-trick, while Sunderland's former Newcastle defender Titus Bramble was sent off. Newcastle led the return fixture in January 2011 1–0 thanks to another Nolan goal, only for Sunderland's Asamoah Gyan to equalise in injury time. The next derby took place in August 2011 at the Stadium of Light, where Newcastle won 1–0 thanks to a Ryan Taylor free kick. The return fixture at St. James' Park ended 1–1. Both sides were charged by the FA for failing to keep their players under control, charges which they both accepted.

On 14 April 2013, Sunderland defeated Newcastle 3–0 at St. James' Park in manager Paolo Di Canio's second game in charge, their first away win in the fixture in 13 years. The attendance for the game was 52,355 with 2,000 Sunderland fans, this included the suspended Black cats midfielder Craig Gardner. The Sunderland goalscorers were Stéphane Sessègnon in the 27th minute, Adam Johnson in the 74th minute and David Vaughan in the 82nd minute. The following season saw Sunderland do the double over Newcastle for the first time since the 1966/67 season and win three derbies in a row since 1923- the Black Cats edging a 2–1 Stadium of Light on 27 October 2013, before a repeat 0–3 victory at St. James' Park on 1 February 2014, with goals from Fabio Borini, Adam Johnson and Jack Colback.

On 21 December 2014, Adam Johnson scored a late goal in the 90th minute past goalkeeper Jak Alnwick at St. James' Park, ensuring that Sunderland had defeated Newcastle in four consecutive derbies - a new record and also Sunderland's third consecutive victory at St. James' Park. On 5 April 2015, Sunderland again defeated Newcastle to make it five derby wins in a row and complete the double victory over Newcastle for a second consecutive season; Jermain Defoe scored from 22 yards on the stroke of half-time to give Sunderland victory. On 25 October 2015, Sunderland once again defeated Newcastle to make it a record sixth consecutive derby victory. A penalty from Adam Johnson opened the scoring which saw Newcastle down to 10 men with Fabricio Coloccini sent off as a result. Then a goal from Billy Jones and a Steven Fletcher volley sealed the win. On 20 March 2016, the two sides met at St James' Park, with Sunderland taking the lead in the first half through Jermaine Defoe, but in the second half with only a couple minutes remaining Alexsandar Mitrovic rescued a point for Newcastle to end their 6 game losing streak against Sunderland. With Sunderland having been relegated to the third tier of English football in 2018, they became eligible for the EFL Trophy, which also included underage teams of Premier League clubs such as Newcastle. Sunderland's first team met Newcastle's Under-21s in the 2018–19 competition, winning 4–0; due to the local interest this match attracted a crowd of over 16,000, far above the average for the competition, but is not counted towards statistics relating to the derby (Sunderland went on to reach the final but lost to Portsmouth on penalties). Newcastle faced Sunderland away in the FA Cup on 6 January 2024, the first derby since 2016. Newcastle won that match 3–0, securing a first away win over their rivals since 2011.

On 13 October 2024, Sunderland A.F.C. Women and Newcastle United W.F.C. played each other in the Women's Championship for the first time at the Stadium of Light, setting a new attendance record of 15,387 for the league in doing so. The previous record attendance for the Women's Championship had been 11,137, set in a match played in 2022.

On 24 May 2025, Sunderland defeated Sheffield United 2–1 at Wembley Stadium in the Championship play-off final to win promotion to the Premier League for the first time since 2017. Sunderland's victory confirmed that the Tyne-Wear derby returned to the English top-flight for the first time since the 2015–16 season.

The two sides would first meet again in the Premier League on 14 December 2025. Sunderland defeated Newcastle 1–0 at home after Newcastle striker Nick Woltemade scored an own goal. The most recent meeting between the two sides was played on 22 March 2026 in the Premier League. Sunderland would end up beating Newcastle 1-2 at St. James’ Park to do the league double over Newcastle for the first time since the 2014–15 season.

== Hooliganism and violence ==
The Tyne–Wear derby has on occasion experienced incidents of football hooliganism. In 1990, as Sunderland led the playoff semi final 2–0, some Newcastle fans entered the pitch, in the hope of getting the match abandoned. There were 160 arrests in connection with a game in 2001.

In March 2002, the Seaburn Casuals (a Sunderland A.F.C. firm) fought with hooligans from the Newcastle Gremlins in a pre-arranged clash near the North Shields Ferry terminal, in what was described as "some of the worst football related fighting ever witnessed in the United Kingdom". The leaders of the Gremlins and Casuals were both jailed for four years for conspiracy, with 28 others jailed for various terms, based on evidence gained after police examined the messages sent by mobile phone between the gang members on the day.

On 2 April 2003, about 95 fans were arrested when around 200 fans of Sunderland and Newcastle clashed in Sunderland city centre before an England UEFA Euro 2004 qualifying match against Turkey in the city. The fans then attacked the police, pelting them with missiles including bottles, cans and wheel trims. Some sources attributed these clashes to a resurgence in the conflict between the Gremlins and Seaburn Casuals. At the end of the 2002–03 season, Sunderland topped the football arrests table with 154.

In 2008, after Sunderland beat Newcastle at home for the first time in 28 years, there was a small pitch invasion by Sunderland fans, and missiles were thrown at Newcastle midfielder Joey Barton, although manager Roy Keane played down the seriousness of the incident. On 16 January 2011 in the FA Premier League clash at the Stadium of Light, a 17-year-old Sunderland fan ran onto the pitch and pushed over Newcastle goalkeeper Steve Harper, and was among 24 people who were arrested in connection with a string of hooligan incidents at the game. However, incidents of violence are not as common as sometimes suggested – for example Sunderland were awarded the best behaved fans award for the 2010–11 season, despite the derby day arrests.

On 14 April 2013, some Newcastle United fans rioted on the streets of Newcastle upon Tyne following the 3–0 defeat by Sunderland at St. James' Park, with one fan's attack on a police horse gaining international media attention. Four police officers were injured and 29 arrests made. Confrontation between fans of the rival teams at Newcastle railway station was shown in the television series All Aboard: East Coast Trains in an episode entitled "Derby Day".

=== Away fans and policing ===
The 1996–97 season saw Sunderland join Newcastle in the Premier League. However proposals were put forward to ban Newcastle fans from the ageing Roker Park on safety and security grounds. A last-minute agreement by Sunderland and Northumbria Police was to allow 1,000 Newcastle supporters to attend the game. However, Newcastle had already made arrangements for a live televised beamback, and so rejected the offer. Responding to criticism from fans, Newcastle's then Chief Executive Freddie Fletcher suggested that the state of Roker Park was to blame and told fans: "Don't blame Newcastle. Don't blame Northumbria Police. Blame Sunderland!" In response to the ban on Newcastle fans at Roker Park, Newcastle placed a similar ban on Sunderland fans for the return fixture at St. James' Park.

Fearing that this would set a precedent for future derby matches, supporters groups and fanzines of both sides joined to form the Wear United pressure group. Supporters of both sides were assured that away fans would be able to attend future derby games, though this was probably more to do with the fact that the 1996–97 season was Sunderland's last at Roker Park before moving into the brand new Stadium of Light.

In January 2014, following violence after the previous year's derby in Newcastle, a 'bubble trip' was announced for Sunderland fans wishing to travel to St. James' Park for the game- supporters would be denied entry unless they travelled to the game on official buses leaving from Sunderland, regardless of where they lived. The measure resulted in an angry response from both Sunderland and Newcastle supporters, with websites and fanzines from both sets of fans issuing a joint statement opposing the measure. Subsequently, a row broke out between the clubs and Northumbria Police as to why the bubble trip was being implemented, and Sunderland AFC withdrew the conditions, and in a joint statement with Newcastle United, criticised Northumbria Police's claims that they had not directed changes in kick off times over many years as 'false and absurd', and that all future games would kick off at times to suit the clubs and any TV broadcasts.

== Results ==
As of 22 March 2026

Competition	Played	Newcastle wins	Sunderland wins	Draws	Newcastle goals	Sunderland goals
League	144	51	49	44	212	214
FA Cup	9	3	3	3	11	11
League Cup	2	0	0	2	4	4
Promotion play-offs	2	0	1	1	0	2
Texaco Cup/Anglo-Scottish Cup	2	0	2	0	1	4
Total	159	54	55	50	228	235

=== League doubles ===
Across their 74 seasons competing in the same division, there have been 18 seasons in which one club won both league fixtures between Newcastle United and Sunderland; Newcastle United and Sunderland have done nine doubles each.

Season	Division	Club	Result at Newcastle	Result at Sunderland
1904–05	Division One (1st tier)	Sunderland	1–3	3–1
1908–09	Division One (1st tier)	Sunderland	1–9	3–1
1909–10	Division One (1st tier)	Newcastle United	1–0	0–2
1911–12	Division One (1st tier)	Newcastle United	3–1	1–2
1913–14	Division One (1st tier)	Newcastle United	2–1	1–2
1919–20	Division One (1st tier)	Sunderland	2–3	2–0
1920–21	Division One (1st tier)	Newcastle United	6–1	0–2
1923–24	Division One (1st tier)	Sunderland	0–2	3–2
1954–55	Division One (1st tier)	Sunderland	1–2	4–2
1955–56	Division One (1st tier)	Newcastle United	3–1	6–1
1956–57	Division One (1st tier)	Newcastle United	6–2	1–2
1966–67	Division One (1st tier)	Sunderland	0–3	3–0
1992–93	Division One (2nd tier)	Newcastle United	1–0	1–2
2002–03	Premier League	Newcastle United	2–0	0–1
2005–06	Premier League	Newcastle United	3–2	1–4
2013–14	Premier League	Sunderland	0–3	2–1
2014–15	Premier League	Sunderland	0–1	1–0
2025–26	Premier League	Sunderland	1–2	1–0

== Honours ==
As of 16 March 2025

Competition	Newcastle United	Sunderland
Football League First Division	4	6
FA Cup	6	2
EFL Cup	1	0
FA Charity/Community Shield	1	1
Total	12	9

== Records and statistics ==
=== Derby double ===
Newcastle have achieved the double in nine seasons (most recently in the 2005–06 season), while Sunderland have also managed nine doubles, most recently in 2025–26.

Newcastle

Season	Home	Away
1909–10	1–0	2–0
1911–12	3–1	2–1
1913–14	2–1	2–1
1920–21	6–1	2–0
1955–56	3–1	6–1
1956–57	6–2	2–1
1992–93	1–0	2–1
2002–03	2–0	1–0
2005–06	3–2	4–1

Sunderland

Season	Home	Away
1904–05	3–1	3–1
1908–09	9–1	3–1
1919–20	2–0	3–2
1923–24	3–2	2–0
1954–55	4–2	2–1
1966–67	3–0	3–0
2013–14	2–1	3–0
2014–15	1–0	1–0
2025–26	1–0	2–1

=== Biggest wins ===
Sunderland 9–1: (A) 5 December 1908

Newcastle 6–1 (H): 9 October 1920, (A) 26 December 1955

=== Most consecutive wins ===
Sunderland 6 games: 14 April 2013 – October 2015

Newcastle 5 games: 24 February 2002 – 17 April 2006

=== Most consecutive draws ===
4 games: 8 April 1985 – 13 May 1990

=== Most derby appearances ===
Club	Player	League	Cup	Total
Sunderland	George Holley	17	5	22
Newcastle	Jimmy Lawrence	22	5	27

=== Most derby goals ===
Club	Player	League	Cup	Total
Sunderland	George Holley	13	2	15
Newcastle	Jackie Milburn	9	2	11

=== Attendances ===
==== Highest attendances ====
Venue	Attendance	Score	Date
Sunderland	68,004	Sunderland 2–2 Newcastle United	1950
Newcastle	56,000	Newcastle United 1–1 Sunderland	1905

==== Lowest attendances ====
Venue	Attendance	Score	Date
Sunderland	25,400	Sunderland 2–0 Newcastle East End	1888
Newcastle	17,494	Newcastle United 1–3 Sunderland	1893

== Crossing the divide ==
A number of players have made first team appearances for both Newcastle and Sunderland, namely:

- Patrick van Aanholt
- William Agnew
- Jack Allan
- Stan Anderson
- Keith Armstrong
- John Auld
- Henry Bedford
- Joe Blackett
- Paul Bracewell
- Titus Bramble
- Michael Bridges
- Ivor Broadis
- Alan Brown
- Charles Burgess
- Steven Caldwell
- John Campbell
- Michael Chopra
- Lee Clark
- Jeff Clarke
- Jack Colback
- Andy Cole
- Laurie Crown
- Joseph Devine
- Jack Dowsey
- David Elliott
- Robbie Elliott
- Ray Ellison
- Alan Foggon
- Howard Gayle
- Tommy Gibb
- Shay Given
- Thomas Grey
- Ron Guthrie
- Thomas Hall
- Ralph Hann
- Steve Hardwick
- Mick Harford
- Steve Harper
- John Harvey
- David Kelly
- Alan Kennedy
- Ki Sung-yueng
- Kazenga LuaLua
- James Logan
- Pat Lowrey
- Javier Manquillo
- Andy McCombie
- Albert McInroy
- Robert McKay
- Frederick Mearns
- Billy Milne
- Bobby Moncur
- Daryl Murphy
- Lionel Pérez
- James Raine
- Raymond Robinson
- Robert Robinson
- Pop Robson
- Danny Rose
- Tom Rowlandson
- Louis Saha
- Matthew Scott
- Len Shackleton
- Danny Simpson
- John Smith
- Simon Smith
- John Spence
- Colin Suggett
- Ernie Taylor
- Robert Thomson
- Thomas Urwin
- Barry Venison
- Chris Waddle
- Nigel Walker
- Derek Weddle
- Billy Whitehurst
- David Lalty Willis
- Jack Wilkinson
- DeAndre Yedlin
- David Young

In addition, the guest system operated in British football during World War II meant that most teams fielded guest players. Amongst these was the Newcastle forward Jackie Milburn who made two guest appearances for Sunderland against Gateshead twice during the 1944–45 season. Another Newcastle striker, Albert Stubbins also guested for Sunderland several times during the 1941–42 season, including an appearance in the Wartime Cup Final, which Sunderland lost to Wolverhampton Wanderers despite a Stubbins goal.

=== Managers ===
Bob Stokoe, who won the FA Cup as a player with Newcastle in 1955, was manager of Sunderland between 1972 and 1977, guiding the Wearsiders to their famous FA Cup victory in 1973 and promotion to Division One in 1976. He returned to manage them briefly again in 1987.

Only two men have taken charge of both teams. On 15 May 2007, Newcastle appointed Sam Allardyce as their new manager, who had played for Sunderland in the early 1980s. He was named the new manager of Sunderland on 9 October 2015, becoming the first person to manage both derby rivals. In summer 2019, former Sunderland Manager, Steve Bruce was appointed as Newcastle manager, replacing Rafael Benítez.

== See also ==
- Tyne–Tees derby
- Tees–Wear derby
