= Roderick MacKenzie =

Roderick MacKenzie may refer to:

- Roddie MacKenzie (1901–?), Scottish footballer
- Roderick MacKenzie (British Army officer), British Army officer
- Roderick Mackenzie (politician) (1868–1957), Canadian politician
- Roderick Mackenzie, 4th Earl of Cromartie (1904–1989), Scottish soldier and peer
- Roderick Mackenzie of Terrebonne (c. 1761−1844), Canadian fur trader, landowner and politician
- Roderick Mackenzie (Jacobite) (died 1746), Jacobite soldier
- Roderick Mackenzie, Lord Prestonhall (c. 1635–1712), Scottish judge
- Rod Mackenzie (Roderick Alexander Mackenzie, born 1933), Australian politician

== See also ==
- Rod McKenzie (Roderick McCulloch McKenzie, 1909–2000), rugby union player for New Zealand, and for Scotland
