= Paul Darling =

English commercial law barrister (1960–2024)

Paul Darling OBE KC

Chair, Horserace Betting Levy Board
- In office 1 April 2020 – 2 August 2024
- Minister: Oliver Dowden; Nadine Dorries; Michelle Donelan; Lucy Frazer; Lisa Nandy
- Preceded by: Paul Lee
- Succeeded by: Roger Devlin

Personal details
- Born: Paul Antony Darling; 15 March 1960
- Died: 2 August 2024 (aged 64)
- Education: St Edmund Hall, Oxford
- Occupation: Construction & Commercial Barrister
- Website: https://www.pauldarlingqc.co.uk

Paul Antony Darling OBE KC (15 March 1960 – 2 August 2024) was an English commercial law barrister, King's Counsel, and chair of the Horserace Betting Levy Board.

== Early life and education ==
Darling grew up in Cleadon in County Durham and went to Tonstall School in Sunderland before attending Winchester College and then St Edmund Hall, Oxford. His mother was a magistrate and his brother Ian Darling is a British circuit judge. Darling's grandfather was Newcastle United player Jack Allen, who scored for Newcastle in the 1932 FA Cup final.

== Career ==
Darling was called to the bar at Middle Temple in 1983, and in 1999 was appointed King's Counsel. He was also called to the Northern Ireland Bar.

In 2010, Darling became head of Keating Chambers where he remained until 2017. He then took the unusual step of moving chambers, joining general commercial set, 39 Essex Chambers.

His areas of practice included construction and engineering, procurement, domestic and international arbitration – areas in which he had been ranked at tier or band 2 levels by The Legal 500 and Chambers and Partners directories. He was Treasurer of Middle Temple for 2024.

=== Significant cases ===
Darling was instructed as lead counsel on several significant cases.

- Between 1991 and 2003 he represented the contractor in McAlpine v Panatown & Unex. The dispute involved all aspects of construction law and professional negligence, and culminated in a 14-week Technology and Construction Court trial. The case is often referenced in English contract law education as a result of the issues raised around the rights of third parties or Privity of contract.
- Darling represented the appellants, Scarborough Borough Council, in a 1997 case concerning the collapse of Scarborough's Holbeck Hall Hotel into the sea (captured live on television news).
- In the 2011 case of Flannery & Another v Halifax Estate Agencies Limited, Darling represented the plaintiffs.

=== Horse racing ===
In 2006 Darling was appointed a non-executive member of the Horserace Totalisator Board or “Tote”. Between 2008 and 2014, he was a government-appointed member of the Horserace Betting Levy Board. He was chairman of the Sports Grounds Safety Authority between 2009 and 2015. He was appointed chairman of the Association of British Bookmakers in 2014. In 2020 he was appointed chairman of the Horserace Betting Levy Board, and was reappointed in July 2023.

== Personal life and death ==
Married to Camilla, Darling was chairman of Darling's Pharmacy, a family business established in 1905 by John Darling. Paul Darling died suddenly on 2 August 2024, at the age of 64.

== Publications ==
Darling wrote and edited several articles and books, and his cases and work have been described in learned and peer-reviewed journals. Examples include:

- Who Do You Want? Who Do You Get? Appointing the Right Arbitrator, a peer-reviewed article in Asian Dispute Review in 2010
- Lafarge (Aggregates) Ltd v Newham London Borough Council - case review in Arbitration Law Reports and Review
- Straight There No Detours: Direct Access to Barristers, a research paper by the University of Westminster
- Wilmot-Smith on Construction Contracts, 4th Ed. 2021 (Co-Editor)

== Honours ==
In the 2015 Birthday Honours, Darling became the third member of his family to be appointed to the Order of the British Empire. He was recognised for his services to sport safety and horse racing.

Government offices
Preceded by Paul Anthony Lee	Chair, Horserace Betting Levy Board; 2020–2024	Succeeded by TBD
