= Bill McPhillips =

Scottish footballer

Personal information
- Full name: William Pearson McPhillips
- Date of birth: 6 July 1910
- Place of birth: Musselburgh, Scotland
- Date of death: 1992 (aged 81–82)
- Place of death: Yorkshire, England
- Height: 6 ft 1 in (1.85 m)
- Position: Goalkeeper

Senior career*
Years	Team	Apps	(Gls)
1930–1938	Newcastle Utd	34	(0)
1938–1939	Guildford City	?	
1939–1940	Bradford City	?	
	Hartlepool Utd	1	
- * Club domestic league appearances and goals

William Pearson McPhillips (6 July 1910 – 1992) was a Scottish professional football goalkeeper who played his club football for Newcastle United. He was in the Newcastle squad that won the FA Cup in 1932.

== Professional career ==
McPhillips was reserve goalkeeper for Newcastle and spent eight years at the club. He had very little luck keeping down a first team place. McPhillips replaced Albert McInroy in the 1933/34 season when he sustained an injury in a 2–0 defeat at Portsmouth on 30 December 1933, which put him out for the rest of the season. He made his debut in the 9–2 win against Liverpool on New Year's Day, 1934. Newcastle's form then declined and they ended the 1933–34 season being relegated to the Second Division. He had brief spells with Guildford City, Bradford City and he guested for Hartlepool United during World War II.
