= Port of Caraquet =

Fishing port in Canada

Coordinates: 47°47′45″N 64°55′47″W

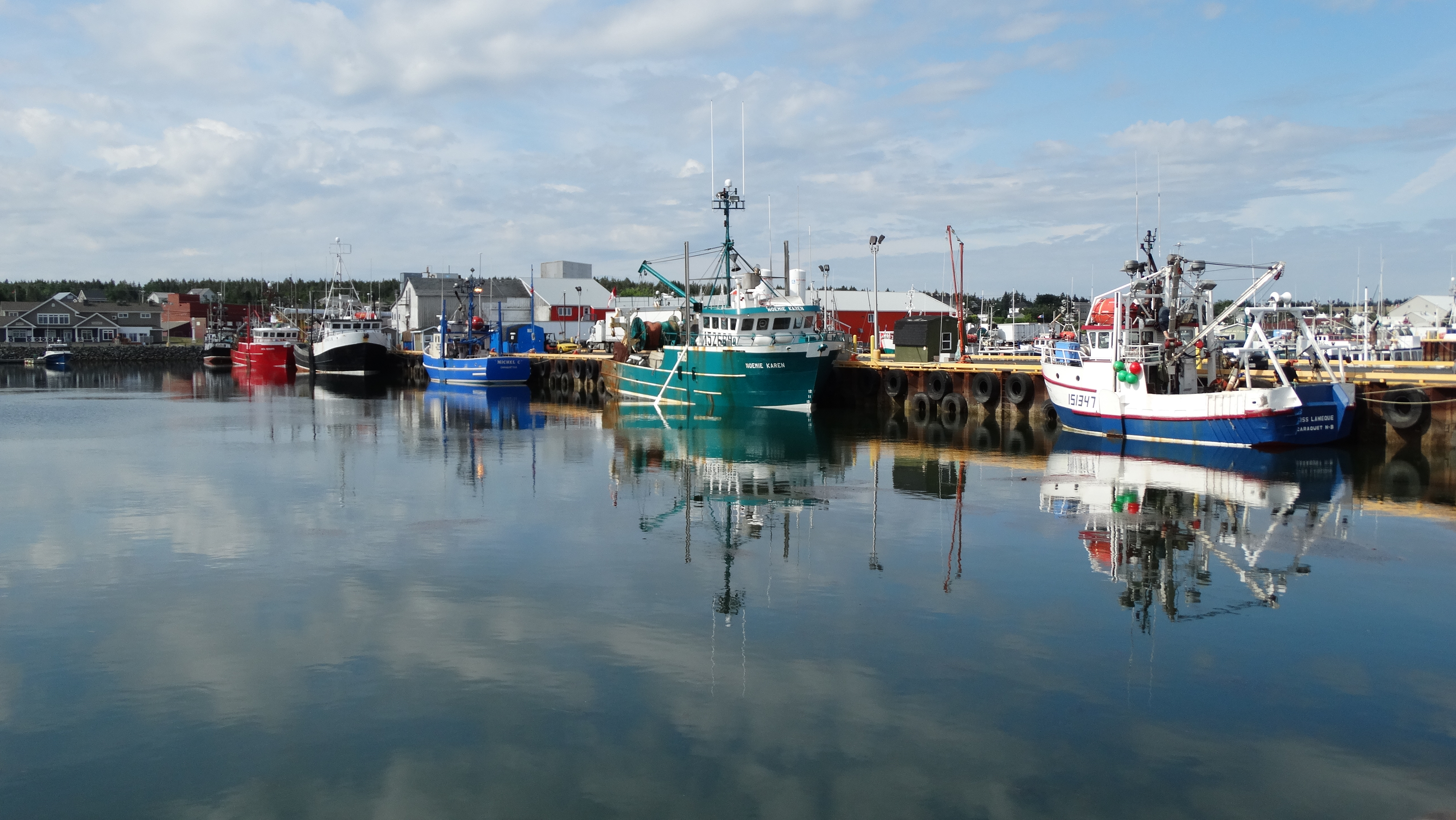
- Interactive map of Port of Caraquet

Location
- Country: Canada

Details
- Opened: Beginning of 18th century

Statistics
- Website https://www.portcaraquet.ca

The port is in the center of Caraquet.

The port of Caraquet (also called Caraquet wharf or Young's wharf) is a neighborhood in the city of Caraquet, in New Brunswick, Canada. Used for over two centuries, the port is at the center of the region's economy and history. It is one of the province's main fishing ports. Nowadays, the port is also one of the region's main tourist attractions and a cultural center.

== Location ==
The city of Caraquet is built on a plateau bordering Caraquet Bay, which communicates to the east with Chaleur Bay. Most of the coastline consists of slopes or cliffs reaching up to fifteen meters high in some places. Only a few places are accessible by sea, mainly where the Petite Rivière Caraquet and the Brideau and Chenard streams flow into the bay. The thin strip of lowlands between these two streams was therefore a prime location for building a port, especially since it is one of the first accessible places after the Nepisiguit River, about fifty kilometers to the west, with the Capes preventing access to much of the coast.

Saint-Pierre Boulevard, Route 11, runs alongside the port. To the west, Carrefour Avenue connects the various facilities to the east, where it joins Quai Street.

== History ==
=== Origins ===
The particular location of the site means it has been used for centuries. The Micmacs used the place as a shortcut to travel from Chaleur Bay to Saint-Simon Bay and had a camp there. The Vikings are said to have been the first Europeans to visit the region in the 11th century, but Basque, Breton, and Norman fishermen frequented the area from the 13th century. Bordeaux merchants established a fishing post at Miscou in 1619, and at the same time, Governor Nicolas Denys was trading in the region. Four Breton and Norman families, including Gabriel Giraud's, settled in Caraquet from the 1720s onwards. Giraud lived further east, but probably used the area, as Gamaliel Smethurst, on his journey to Fort Beauséjour, met him there on a November morning in 1761. A village centered on the port developed from 1757. The population had to exile in 1761 following Roderick MacKenzie's raid, but gradually returned a few years later. Indeed, Raymond Bourdages from Bonaventure operated a fishing post in Caraquet from 1762. In 1776, during the American Revolution, American privateers attacked merchants in Chaleur Bay, including Bourdages' post in Caraquet. On March 22, 1779, John Allan incited the Micmacs of the coast, and 16 of them attacked port of Caraquet.

=== Fishery control ===
Until the early 19th century, the fishing industry was underdeveloped, practiced alongside agriculture for subsistence. The Jersey company Robin, Jones & Whitman built a port at Pointe Brideau in 1838. This enterprise expanded until 1875 when its facilities included a wharf and over twenty buildings. English merchant Robert Young built another port in 1850, this one at the mouth of the Chenard stream. They also owned stores and other buildings located on Saint-Pierre Boulevard, just above the port. These controlled the city's economy and politics for several decades.

The port played a central role during the January 1875 riots, the climax of what would become the Louis Mailloux affair. Caraquet fishermen were impoverished by the companies' payment method, paying them with tokens that could only be exchanged at their stores. The companies only provided enough for the fishermen to survive, not enough to emancipate themselves. This situation, mixed with various machinations and dissatisfaction caused by Law 87 passed in 1871, which aimed to reform education, led to an uprising of part of the population. On January 15, an angry crowd went to Robert Young's store and residence in the east of the port, atop the cliffs. Since he was in Fredericton at the time, they terrified his wife, who sent a telegram to her husband, warning him that they wanted to kill him and burn the accounts and mortgages. Following this event, Robert Young summoned the police and the army to Caraquet to quell the riot. The 14 people arrested after the shooting on January 27 were imprisoned in the same store.

=== New Markets and Technologies ===
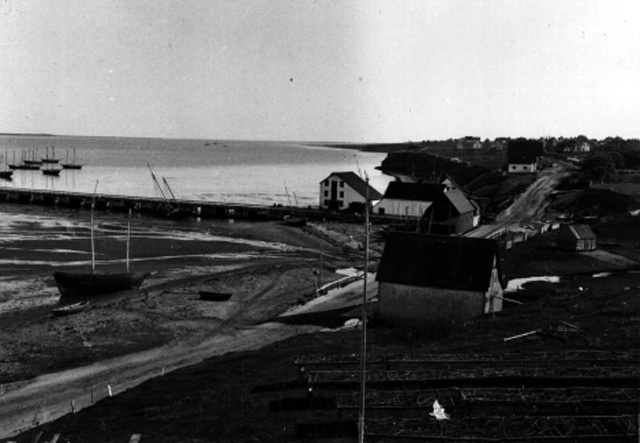
The facilities of the Young Company shortly after their acquisition in 1905.

From the 1870s, the port of Caraquet was also used to export timber to England. Other goods were shipped, mainly fish. Imported goods were mostly salt. The presence of a Norwegian consulate in Caraquet in the 19th century testified to the importance of trade. Ocean liners occasionally docked at the port.

From the late 19th century, refrigeration revolutionized fishing and fish trade. The federal government created an aid program for the establishment of boëtte coolers. The Fishermen's Bait Association of Caraquet, the first group of its kind in the province, was incorporated in 1903, and the first port refrigerated warehouse was built in 1906.

A factory was built in 1939 by the American company Gorton Pew on the south side of the boulevard, opposite Young's wharf. This company would represent another outlet for fish products. It mainly processed frozen cod or sole fillets, and later mainly shrimp and herring.

The federal government purchased Young's company port in 1902. The facilities were improved in 1905. At the same time, an extension of the Caraquet line was built by Canadian National, passing through the Chenard stream valley to the boulevard. This extension had been proposed as early as 1908 by MP Onésiphore Turgeon but had not borne fruit.

=== Transformation ===
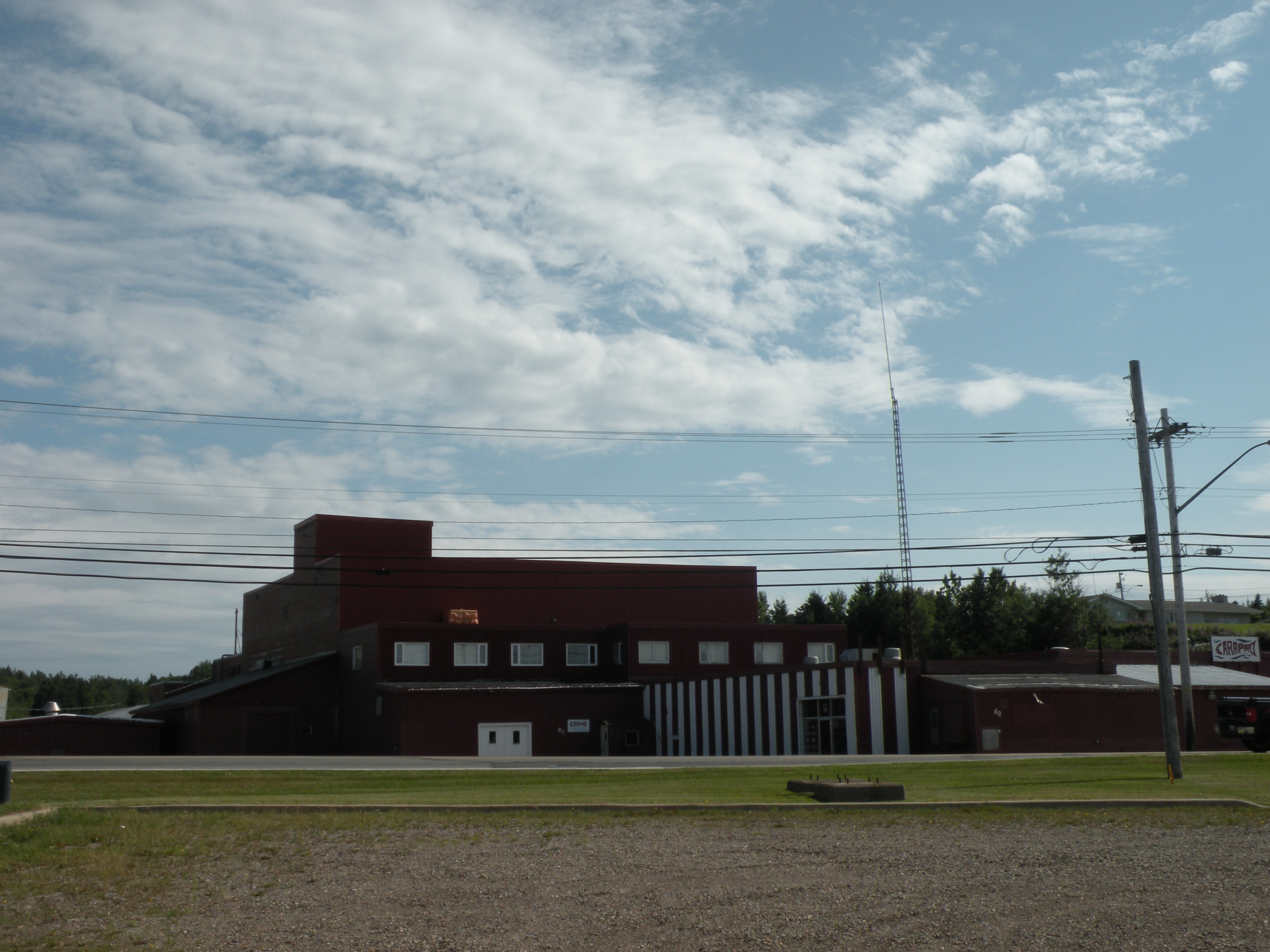
Carapro factory.

Competition harmed Compagnie Robin, Jones & Whitman, and its facilities were abandoned in 1958. The port underwent profound transformations from that date, especially at the Marais site located between the two wharves. Founded in 1959, the School of Fisheries moved four years later to its new port buildings. L'Enfant-Jésus Hospital opened its doors the same year, on the site of the Robin Company manager's residence. The latter was moved and served as a residence for the Hospitaller Sisters of Saint Joseph until its demolition in the 1980s. The Acadian Museum of Caraquet moved into its new building on August 26, 1967. The Cirtex textile factory was built in 1974. It closed after a long strike but once again marked a decline in the economic importance of fishing. In 1978, a refrigerated warehouse was built in Bas-Caraquet. It mysteriously burned down shortly after opening and was rebuilt at the port of Caraquet. In 1990, filling work allowed the Marais to be drained and land reclaimed from the sea, for the construction of a marina, the Carrefour de la Mer recreational complex, and a promenade on jetties. The Irving Oil company's petroleum product tanks standing on a cliff above the port were destroyed during the same decade. Following the crab crisis of the 1980s and the moratorium on cod fishing in 1992, the federal government created the Atlantic Groundfish Strategy, a $1.5 billion five-year aid program to help counter its economic consequences. A Extravacances center was built in 1997 at a cost of $300,000, coming from this program. A chalet project in the vicinity of the Fisheries School was proposed in 1998. In 2003, the Carapro factory, the former Gorton Pew, closed its doors. Wanting to take advantage of the city's maritime setting, the American company Super 8 built a 50-room hotel in 2003. These works proved difficult because of the remnants of the Robin Company's facilities buried during the construction of Carrefour de la Mer. The Chenard stream overflowed in 2007, flooding the Carapro factory, destroying the fish processing equipment. A building comprising a fish processing plant, a fish market, and a restaurant was inaugurated in 2010. The old Robin Company store was demolished in 2012 to make way for a grocery store.

== Management and Services ==
From 1937 to 1961, the Caraquet Chamber of Commerce received control of the port. After 1961, the municipality jointly managed the port with the Chamber of Commerce. In 1967, the port lost its commercial status. After sending a delegation to Ottawa in 1986 to meet Minister Tom Siddon, the port of Caraquet Committee Inc. was created on December 8, 1987. It was the second of its kind in Canada. Its founders were Germain Blanchard, Gérard Saint-Cyr, Roméo Michon, Claude Lebouthillier, Martin J. Légère, and Valmond Chiasson. It is composed of members of the municipal council, the chamber of commerce, fishermen, and owners of port-related businesses. The Committee served as a model for several other port cities. It is the winner of the 2008 National Excellence Award from the Small Boat Ports Program.

The port of Caraquet Committee and local businesses offer most of the necessary services, whether for purchasing or repairing equipment, provisioning, or cleaning. A shipyard is located in the neighboring village of Bas-Caraquet. Navigation and rescue are ensured by the Shippagan Coast Guard Maritime Station, supported by the Caraquet-Bas-Caraquet Volunteer Fire Brigade.

== Port elements ==
=== Basins and Wharves ===
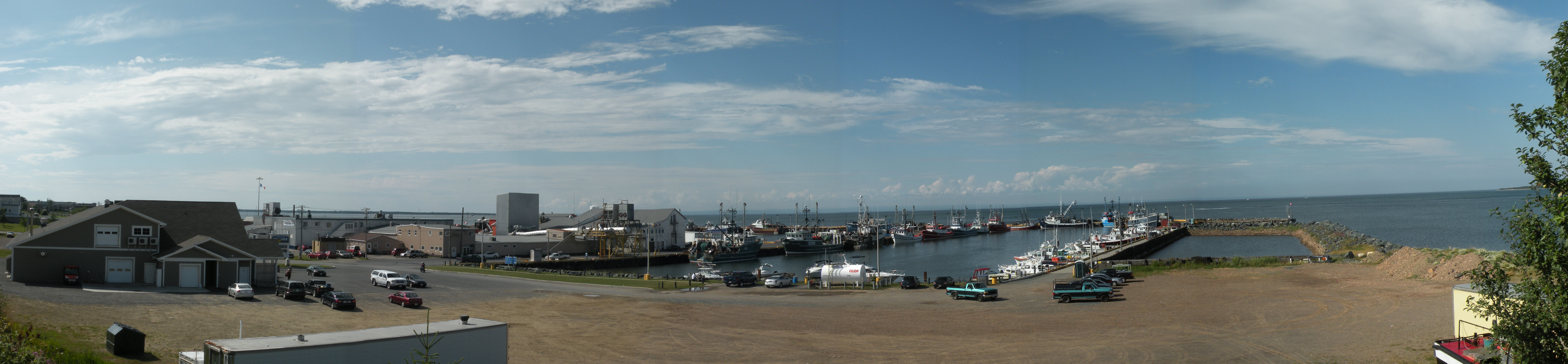
Panorama of the docks and factories.

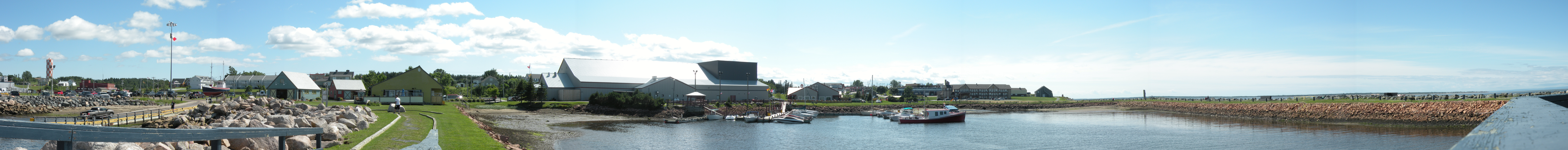
Panorama of the recreational and tourist part of the port.

The fishing port has three basins, numbered 1 to 3. It has a main central wharf in the shape of a "T". Its mooring facade is 260 meters long. The west wharf, 85 meters long, forms basin No. 2, while the east wharf forms basin No. 3. Basin No. 3 is equipped with a fuel supply station. The port can accommodate boats measuring up to 135 meters long, with a draft of up to 6.22 meters.

In basin No. 1, to the west, is the marina, which has two wharves and a boat ramp. There is another basin further west that has a single wharf where the Jos-Frédéric is moored.

A promenade on the jetties offers a viewpoint of the port, the city, the bay, and the Gaspé Peninsula.

=== Buildings ===
In the center of the fishing port are the fish processing plants of Belle-Baie Industries and the Japanese company Ichiboshi, specialized in crab. There is also an ice plant. Next to the west wharf is the harbormaster's office.

The Carapro building is now abandoned.

The port is also a major cultural center of Caraquet. It houses the New Brunswick Fisheries School, an institution offering training related to fishing and navigation. CCNB-Péninsule acadienne also offers some other professional courses or adult education there. There is also a public indoor swimming pool. The Acadian Museum of Caraquet exhibits various objects on the region's history. The Théâtre populaire d'Acadie presents some of its works at the Boîte-Théâtre. The Bot'à Chanson is a special attraction. Moored in the marina, the Jos-Frédéric is a floating concert hall where you can attend a concert by musician Donat Lacroix. The Carrefour de la Mer is a recreational-tourist complex. It includes a large performance hall with indoor and outdoor stages, a restaurant, a snack bar, a souvenir shop, an artisanal soap factory, and a tourist information center (Extravacation center).

On Saint-Pierre Boulevard, at the top of the slope south of the port, are shops and several dozen residences. On Robin Street is a Fisheries and Oceans Canada office. An interesting building, at number 26 on the same street, is Captain Albert's house, which has been a municipal historic site since 2006. It was built around 1870 for Polycarpe Albert, captain, and carpenter. It also served as a school for several years. The building is considered an example of Caraquet's neoclassical architecture. The house is covered with blue-painted cedar shingles.

The port has two lighthouses, or lighthouse imitations, namely the hotel's and the Carrefour de la Mer's. The hotel's plans were modified to respect local architecture. The walls are covered with cedar shingles. The lighthouse and navigation light of Foley Beach Park are also visible from the promenade.

=== Others ===
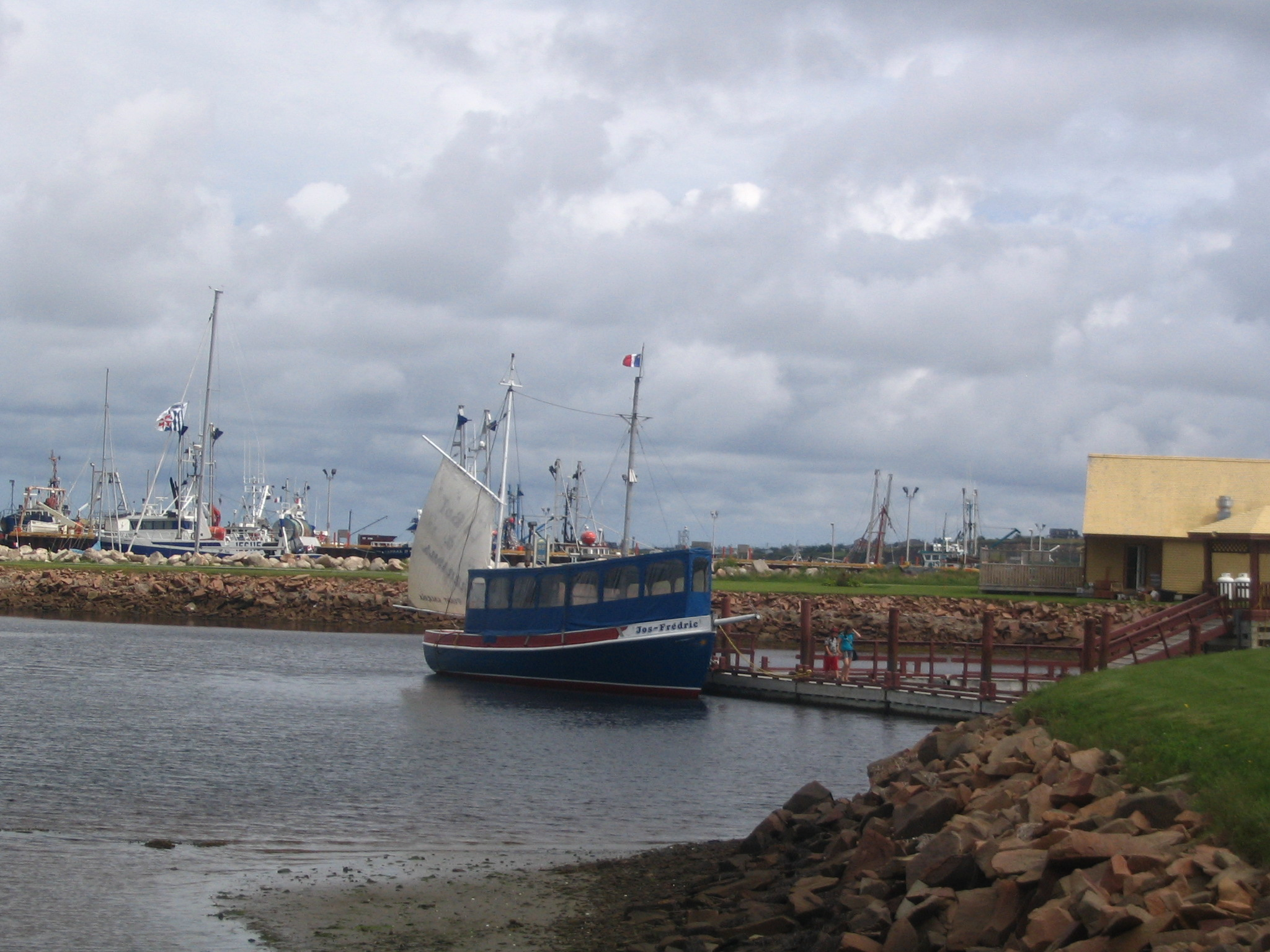
Jos-Frederic

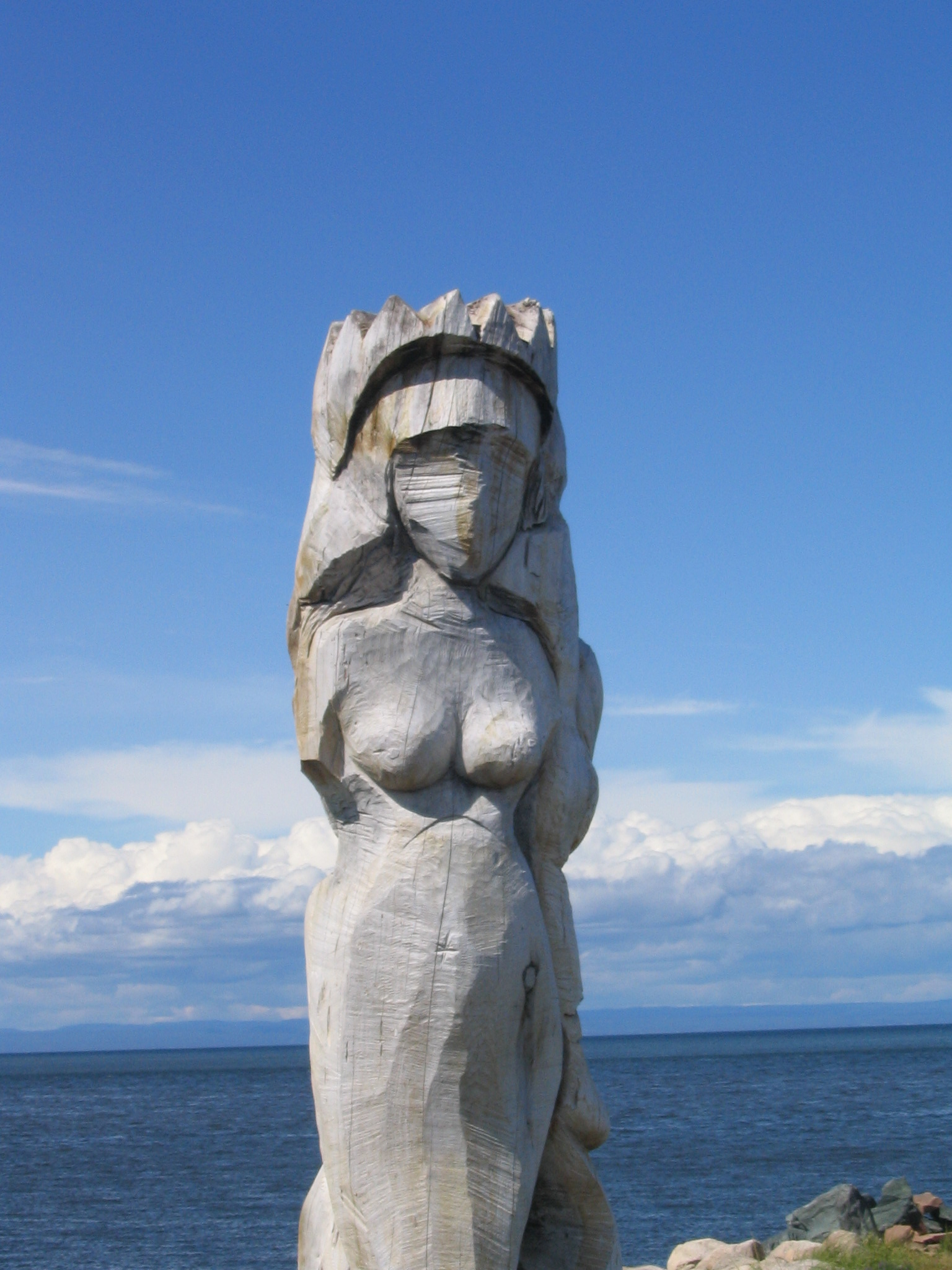
Présage

On one of the jetties is Présage, a nearly three-meter-high wooden statue.

The port includes Richelieu Park, where there are picnic tables and children's games. It is connected by an asphalt path to Foley Park.

== Fishing Industry ==
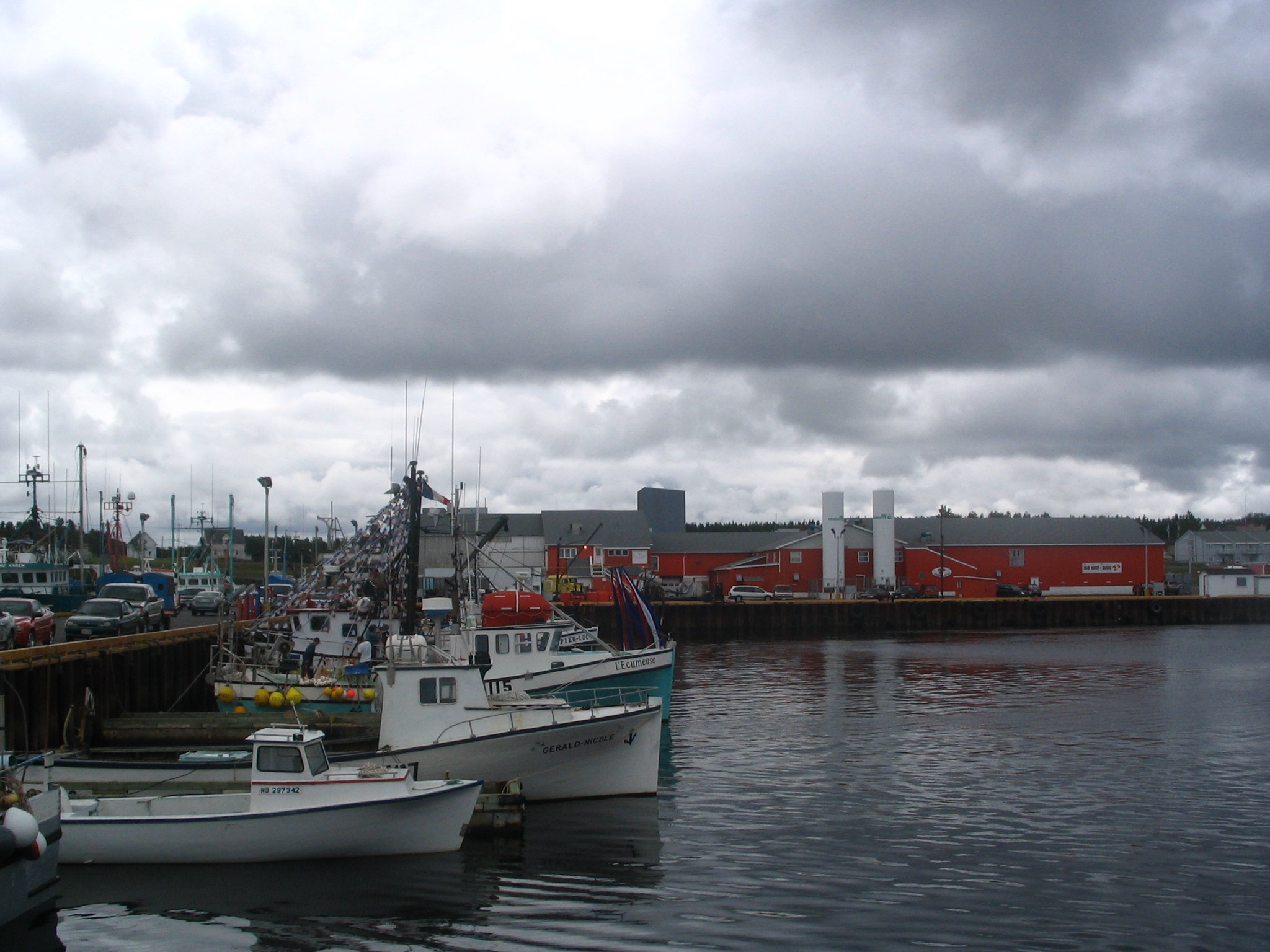
Boats for coastal and semi-offshore fishing lined up in front of the factories.

The port of Caraquet is the second busiest in the province in terms of traffic and landings.

Fishing occupies 23% of the workforce in the Acadian Peninsula. The Caraquet region, including the ports of Bas-Caraquet, Anse-Bleue, and Grande-Anse, had, in 1998, 450 fishermen and 1295 employees in processing plants. In the early 2000s, there were an average of 150 employees in manufacturing and repairing maritime equipment. Only the regions of Shippagan, Lamèque Islands, and Miscou have more jobs in the maritime sector. More and more processing plants are closing in the region due to declining fish stocks, the arrival of various technologies, and competition among different companies. Despite the population decline and the difficulties of the fishing industry, the people of Caraquet have managed to preserve the city's maritime tradition and reduce rural exodus.

The port is rarely used for commerce; a boat docked there in 2006 to load tanks. The various boats in the port are used for coastal, semi-offshore, and offshore fishing. Many boats in the region are notable for not being equipped with lifeboats but with survival capsules, manufactured by the company Ovatek in Bas-Caraquet. Several seiners are stationed at the port, including the Ocean Leader and the Apollo III, two of the three largest in the peninsula. Their recent sale to foreign interests could result in the loss of about 200 jobs. The fishing fleet comprises about 75 boats, but up to 150 boats have been seen on festival days. Most of the different vessels measure less than 14 meters long, but some are much larger.

Cod catches have dropped dramatically, leading to several moratoriums on its fishing. Other fish or seafood caught in Caraquet include shrimp, lobster, crab, mackerel, and herring.

Snow crab catches in the Acadian Peninsula amount to a few thousand tons per year. The industry was in crisis between 1984 and 1990 but regained its footing starting in 1992. It suffered again in the early 2000s (see crab crisis).

Year	Catches (in tons)
1984	18 000
1990	4 300
1994	12 000
1998	5 700

Oyster fishing has been practiced in Caraquet Bay since the city's earliest days, in the 18th century. Initially, the product was exported to Quebec but later to other cities starting in 1830. Nowadays, oyster farming is practiced in the western part of the bay, in the Haut-Caraquet neighborhood. The Oyster Eco-Museum explains the history and techniques there.

As early as 1828, some feared the disappearance of the resource due to overfishing. Seeding trials were conducted in the 1850s without success. In the 1880s, the Gloucester and Northumberland beds were the only profitable ones, as the others had been overfished. Fishing originally took place without real regulation, but some legal measures were taken as early as 1861 to protect the beds, including the establishment of a lease system.

Due to falling prices, the Caraquet bed reached a production peak between 1882 and 1888. Catches declined until 1939 and then increased until the 1950s. After that, catches dropped dramatically in the following decades due to pollution. From 718 tons in 1975, it yielded only 43 tons in 1998. Due to actions taken to reduce sources of pollution, this activity is less threatened, but there are sometimes problems, such as an accidental sewage spill in 2007 that caused the temporary prohibition of fishing in certain areas.

== Projects ==
In recent years, there has been a project to connect the Acadian Peninsula and the Gaspé Peninsula by ferry. In New Brunswick, the terminal could be either in Grande-Anse or Caraquet. In Gaspésie, it could be either in Paspébiac or Chandler.

The Ichiboshi fish processing plant will soon be expanded, a $4 million project that will create 250 jobs, in addition to the existing 500. The project includes the construction of a second floor and the relocation of Quai Street.

An Ontario developer plans to rebuild the Caraquet line with a branch line that will pass nearby, in the industrial park. There would apparently be another branch line going to a port in the vicinity, either Caraquet or Bas-Caraquet. Work is expected to begin in 2008.

== Culture ==
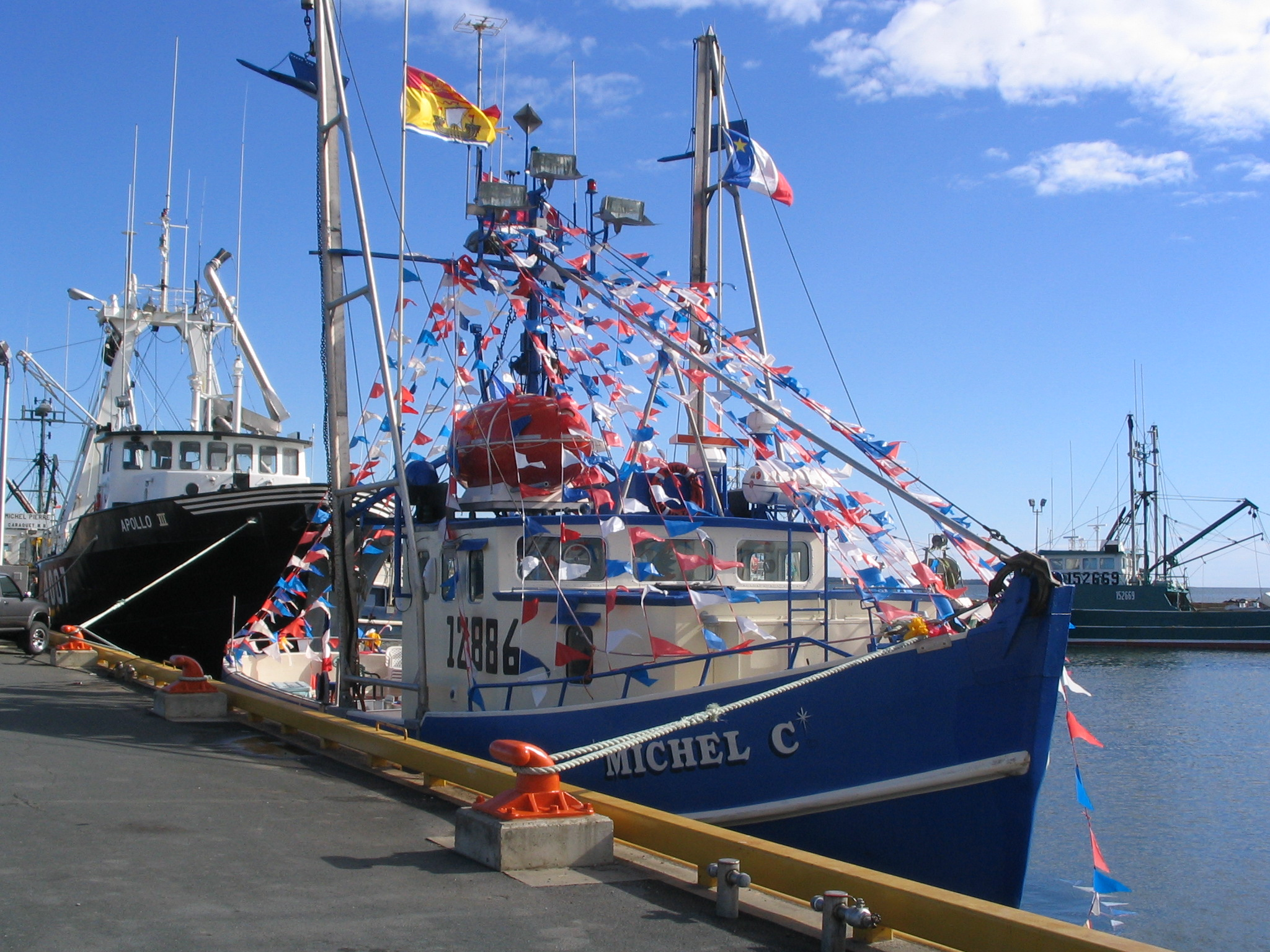
The Blessing of the Boats.

The port is one of the main filming locations for the television series Belle-Baie, broadcast in 2008 on Radio-Canada. The story is set in a fictional Acadian town called Belle-Baie, located on the map in Caraquet, whose port actually has a factory called Belle-Baie.

Every year, the blessing of the boats, one of the most popular events of the Caraquet Acadian Festival, takes place in the port. The priest blesses the fishing fleet. The fishermen then invite the population and tourists to board their boats, decorated for the occasion, for a tour of the bay. This event can accommodate up to 5,000 people. The fireworks and shows at Carrefour de la Mer can accommodate up to 20,000 people.

Like many other ports, Caraquet also has its legends. The best-known is that of the ghost ship of Chaleur Bay, which is said to have once passed the city at a short distance.

The traditional song group Soldat Louis composed a piece about the port of Caraquet, called Gigue à Caraquet.

== Bibliography ==
- Albert-Blanchard, Corrine (1967). Caraquet : quelques bribes de son histoire (in French). Caraquet: Comité du centenaire de Caraquet.
- Landry, Nicolas (2005). Éléments d'histoire des pêches : La Péninsule acadienne du Nouveau-Brunswick (1890–1950). Cahiers des Amériques (in French). Éditions du Septentrion. ISBN 2-89448-443-7.
- LeBreton, Clarence; Thériault, Bernard (1981). Caraquet, 1961-1981 : du plus long village du monde à la plus longue rue des Maritimes (in French).
- Friolet, J. Antonin (1978). Caraquet, village au soleil (in French).
- Ganong, William (1948). The History of Caraquet and Pokemouche (in French). New Brunswick Museum.
- Saint-Cyr, Gérard (1998). L'école et l'industrie des pêches du Nouveau-Brunswick (in French). Éditions Faye. ISBN 2-921824-09-4.
