= Albert McInroy =

English footballer (born 1985)

Personal information
- Date of birth: 23 April 1901
- Place of birth: Walton-le-Dale, England
- Date of death: 7 January 1985 (aged 83)
- Height: 5 ft 11 in (1.80 m)
- Position: Goalkeeper

Youth career
- Upper Walton
- Cuppull Central
- 1921: Preston North End
- High Walton United
- Great Harwood
- Leyland

Senior career*
Years	Team	Apps	(Gls)
1923–1929	Sunderland	215	(0)
1929–1934	Newcastle United	143	(0)
1934–1935	Sunderland	0	(0)
1935–1937	Leeds United	67	(0)
1937–1940	Gateshead	71	(0)

International career
1926	England	1	(0)
- * Club domestic league appearances and goals

Albert McInroy (23 April 1901 – 7 January 1985) was an English professional football goalkeeper who played his club football for Sunderland, Newcastle United and Leeds United. He helped Newcastle win the FA Cup in 1932 and made one appearance for England in 1926.

== Playing career ==
=== Early career ===
McInroy was born in Walton-le-Dale, near Preston, Lancashire and played as a left-winger as a youth for various teams in Lancashire, including a spell with Preston North End as an amateur.

=== Sunderland ===
He began his professional career, by now playing as a goalkeeper, with Sunderland in May 1923. His debut came on 29 September 1923 in a 5–2 victory over Manchester City. Sunderland finished the season in third place in the First Division table. In the following season, McInroy missed only one game and his agility and intelligent football mind made him a first team regular, as he went on to make over 200 appearances for Sunderland over six years.

He made his solitary England appearance at Anfield on 20 October 1926 in a 3–3 draw with Northern Ireland. His Sunderland teammate Warney Cresswell played in front of him at right back.

In October 1929 he was surprisingly sold for £2,750 to arch-rivals Newcastle United.

=== Newcastle United ===
At Newcastle, he quickly established himself as one of the greatest goalkeepers in the country. McInroy was United's first choice 'keeper between 1929 and 1934 making 160 appearances.

In 1932, Newcastle reached the final of the FA Cup against Arsenal, played at Wembley in what became known as the "Over The Line" final. Newcastle won 2–1, both of their goals scored by Jack Allen. Arsenal had led 1–0 with a Bob John goal, but Newcastle's equaliser came after a long ball had appeared to go over the goal line, and out for a goal kick; Newcastle winger Jimmy Richardson nevertheless crossed the ball back into play and Jack Allen levelled the match for the Magpies. The referee ruled that the ball had not gone out of play, even though photographic evidence later showed that the ball had actually crossed the line, and the goal stood. Allen scored again in the second half to win the match 2–1.

As McInroy was at the other end of the pitch, he didn't see the incident clearly but related in an interview with Paul Jannou (Newcastle United's official club historian) that sitting afterwards in an after-game dinner at the Café Royal, David Jack and Frank Moss, two of the Arsenal stars "had no complaints about the goal". He went on to state that all the hullabaloo was created by the media, that the fans and players didn't see it as a controversial incident.

He sustained an injury in a 2–0 defeat at Portsmouth on 30 December 1933, which put him out for the rest of the season. His place was taken by Bill McPhillips, but Newcastle's form then declined and they ended the 1933–34 season being relegated to the Second Division. At the end of the season he left the club after getting involved in a dispute with the directors over benefit payments and returned to Sunderland.

=== Return to Sunderland ===
He returned to Roker Park in June 1934, as third choice 'keeper behind Jimmy Thorpe and Matt Middleton, but after eleven months without making a first team appearance, he moved on to Leeds United in June 1935.

=== Leeds United ===
At Leeds, newly appointed manager Billy Hampson immediately opted for experience with former England internationals like 34-year-old McInroy in goal and 32-year-old George Brown from Burnley in attack.

After two seasons at Elland Road in which Leeds finished in mid-table in the First Division, McInroy moved to Gateshead of the Third Division North, where he played on until the Second World War.

He subsequently became a publican in the North East, including running "The Crown" in Gateshead, which at the time was the largest pub in Gateshead. He also had the "Havelock" in Houghton-le-Spring and the "Baccus" in Newcastle.

== Honours ==
Newcastle United

- FA Cup: 1931–32
