= William Fairhurst (disambiguation) =

William Fairhurst may refer to:

- Billy Fairhurst (William Shaw Fairhurst, 1902-1979), English footballer
- William Fairhurst (1903-1982), English bridge designer and international chess master
- Bill Fairhurst (William Gerard Fairhust, 1907-1984), English footballer, see List of Bury F.C. players (25–99 appearances)
