= Roderick McKenzie (disambiguation) =

Roderick McKenzie was a New Zealand politician.

Roderick McKenzie may also refer to:

- Roderick McKenzie, Canadian fur trader and the cousin of Alexander Mackenzie
- Roderick D. McKenzie (1885-1940), American-Canadian sociologist
- Roddy McKenzie (born 1975), Scottish footballer (Heart of Midlothian FC, Livingston FC)
- Roddy McKenzie (footballer, born 1945), Northern Ireland footballer (Airdrieonians, Hibernian FC, Clydebank FC)
- Roderick McKenzie, one of the editors of Liddell and Scott's A Greek–English Lexicon

== See also ==
- Roddie MacKenzie (born 1901), Scottish footballer (Newcastle United FC)
