= Frank McMenemy =

Scottish footballer (1910-1976)

Personal information
- Full name: Francis McMenemy
- Birth name: Francis McMenamin
- Date of birth: 1910
- Place of birth: Rutherglen, Scotland
- Date of death: 1976 (aged 65–66)
- Place of death: Glasgow, Scotland
- Height: 5 ft 9 in (1.75 m)
- Position: Left half

Senior career*
Years	Team	Apps	(Gls)
–	Burnbank Athletic		
1930–1932	Hamilton Academical	15	(0)
1932–1933	Tunbridge Wells Rangers		
1933–1936	Northampton Town	57	(3)
1936–1937	Crystal Palace	25	(3)
1937	Alloa Athletic	8	(0)
1937–1938	Guildford City		
- * Club domestic league appearances and goals

Francis McMenemy (1910 – 1976) was a Scottish footballer who played as a left half for clubs including Hamilton Academical, Northampton Town and Crystal Palace.

He was one of several footballers in his family: father Jimmy played mainly for Celtic, elder brother John for Motherwell and younger brother Harry for Newcastle United.
