= Caraquet (disambiguation) =

Caraquet can refer to:

- Caraquet, a town in New Brunswick, Canada
- Bas-Caraquet, New Brunswick, a former village in New Brunswick, Canada, now part of the town of Caraquet
- Caraquet (electoral district), a riding that elects members to the Legislative Assembly of New Brunswick
- Caraquet Parish, New Brunswick, a parish containing Caraquet, Bas-Caraquet, a former local service district of the same name, and other nearby communities
