= Ray Robinson =

Ray or Raymond Robinson may refer to:

== Politics ==
- Ray Robinson (ATSIC), Australian indigenous leader
- A. N. R. Robinson (1926–2014), former president and prime minister of Trinidad and Tobago

== Sports ==
- Ray Robinson (Australian cricketer) (1914–1965), Australian cricketer
- Sugar Ray Robinson (1921–1989), American boxer
- Ray Robinson (cricket writer) (1905–1982), Australian journalist and author
- Raymond Robinson (cyclist) (born 1929), South African Olympic cyclist
- Ray Robinson (sportsman) (1940–2001), cricket and rugby union player
- Ray Robinson (footballer) (1895–1964), English footballer
- Ray Robinson (baseball), American baseball player

== Others ==
- Bambie Ray Robinson (born 1994), known as Bambie Thug, Irish singer songwriter and Eurovision contestant
- Ray Robinson (novelist) (born 1971), British novelist, screenwriter and musician.
- Ray A. Robinson (1896–1976), United States Marine Corps general
- Raymond Robinson (Green Man) (1910–1985), severely disfigured man whose years of nighttime walks made him into a figure of urban legend in western Pennsylvania
- Ray Robinson (activist) (1937–1973), African-American civil rights activist and murder victim
- Ray Charles (1930–2004), American musician, born Ray Charles Robinson

== Similar spelling ==
- Rey Robinson (born 1952), American former sprinter
