= Ian Darling (judge) =

British Circuit judge

Ian Galen Darling (born 27 October 1962) is a British Circuit judge.

== Career ==
Darling was educated at Winchester College and King's College London (LLB, 1984). He was called to the bar at Middle Temple in 1985 and served as a Recorder from 2003 to 2009.

Darling has been a judge at Inner London, Blackfriars, Snaresbrook and Wood Green Crown Courts.

== Family ==
Darling has two children, Alfie and Athena born in 2004 and 2006 respectively.

His late mother, Ann Darling OBE, was a magistrate. His late brother Paul Darling was a KC.
