= Robert Thomson (footballer, born 1903) =

Scottish footballer

Personal information
- Full name: Robert Wilson Thomson
- Date of birth: 23 September 1903
- Place of birth: Falkirk, Scotland
- Date of death: 28 December 1972 (aged 69)
- Place of death: Finchley, England
- Position: Left back

Senior career*
Years	Team	Apps	(Gls)
1923–1924	Laurieston Villa		
1924–1925	Falkirk Amateurs		
1925–1927	Falkirk	28	(0)
1927–1928	Sunderland	19	(0)
1928–1934	Newcastle United	73	(0)
1934	Hull City	4	(0)
1934–1935	Marseille		
1935–1936	Racing Club de Paris		
1936–1937	Ipswich Town		

International career
1927	Scottish League XI	1	(0)
1927	Scotland	1	(0)

Managerial career
- 1950–1952: Ajax
- * Club domestic league appearances and goals

Robert Thomson (23 September 1903 – 28 December 1972) was a Scottish footballer who played for Falkirk, Sunderland, Newcastle United (moving between the Tyne–Wear derby clubs in an exchange deal with Bobby McKay as a potential replacement for Frank Hudspeth, losing his place to David Fairhurst after two seasons), Hull City, Olympique Marseille, Racing Club de Paris and Ipswich Town, and for the Scotland national team and the Scottish League XI.

After retiring as a player, Thomson worked for Ipswich Town as assistant trainer and head trainer, under Scott Duncan. He was also the manager of Dutch side Ajax from November 1950, when he succeeded Jack Reynolds, until his sacking on 4 December 1952. During the Second World War he served in the Royal Air Force.

== Honours ==
Ipswich Town

- Southern League: 1936–37

Scotland

- Home Championship: 1926–27

== Personal life ==
Robert was born in Falkirk, the son of Agnes Wilson and William Thomson.

He was married to June Adele Manning.
