= Harry McMenemy =

Scottish footballer

Personal information
- Full name: Henry McMenemy
- Birth name: Henry McMenamin
- Date of birth: 26 March 1912
- Place of birth: Camlachie, Scotland
- Date of death: 1997 (aged 84–85)
- Place of death: Glasgow, Scotland
- Height: 5 ft 8 1/2 in (1.74 m)
- Position: Inside forward

Senior career*
Years	Team	Apps	(Gls)
- Strathclyde
1931–1937	Newcastle United	138	(34)
1937–1939	Dundee	36	(9)
1939	Gateshead		
1940	→ St Mirren (wartime)		
- * Club domestic league appearances and goals

Henry McMenemy (26 March 1912 – 1997) was a Scottish professional footballer who played as an inside forward.

== Playing career ==
=== Club ===
Born in Glasgow, McMenemy played for Junior club Strathclyde in his hometown before moving to England and Newcastle United in 1931, aged 19.

He was one of six Scots in the Newcastle side which won the FA Cup in his first season, beating the strong Arsenal team of the era in the final, and in the subsequent Charity Shield he scored twice against Everton but still finished on the losing side, with Dixie Dean scoring four as the match finished 5–3. McMenemy went on to make nearly 150 appearances in the Football League over six seasons, three in the top tier and three in the second following Newcastle's relegation in 1934.

In 1937 he returned to Scotland to join Dundee, reuniting with former Newcastle manager Andy Cunningham and teammate Jimmy Boyd; the club suffered relegation in his first campaign. He then reverted to Tyneside in 1939 to sign for Gateshead A.F.C., but the outbreak of World War II caused the abandonment of official football and McMenemy did not play a league match for the club. He did appear briefly for St Mirren during wartime.

=== International career ===
He received one call-up to the Scotland national team, but pulled out due to injury and was replaced by his brother.

== Personal life ==
Harry was the son of Celtic player Jimmy, and his brother John was also a professional footballer; both also played in the inside forward position, and both won the Scottish Football League championship and the Scottish Cup during their careers. Another brother, Joe, featured for Strathclyde Juniors in the later 1930s. They are distantly related to Lawrie McMenemy.

== Honours ==
Newcastle United

- FA Cup: 1931–32
