= Jimmy Torrance =

Scottish footballer and manager

Personal information
- Date of birth: 28 July 1889
- Place of birth: Coatbridge, Scotland
- Date of death: 2 July 1949 (aged 59)
- Height: 5 ft 9 1/2 in (1.77 m)
- Position: Forward

Senior career*
Years	Team	Apps	(Gls)
- Ashfield
1910–1926	Fulham	335	(35)
1926–1927	Walsall	40	
Total		375	(35)

Managerial career
- 1927–1928: Walsall
- * Club domestic league appearances and goals

James Torrance (28 July 1889 – 2 July 1949) was a Scottish footballer and football manager. He played as a utility forward for Fulham for sixteen years, and also spent two seasons at Walsall, including one season as manager.

== Career ==
Joining Fulham from Ashfield in 1910, he spent 16 years at the club, making a total of 355 league appearances, scoring 35 goals. A utility forward, he played in four different attacking positions for the "Cottagers". For almost the entirety of his time at Craven Cottage, the club were in the Second Division and led by Phil Kelso. Andy Ducat was in charge from 1924 to 1926.

He moved to Walsall in July 1926, and replaced David Ashworth as manager for the 1927–28 campaign. He masterminded a 7–0 win over Coventry City in the Third Division South, and signed David Fairhurst and Moses Lane. Torrance played forty league and cup games for "Saddlers", but the club only avoided applying for re-election by two points, and he left Fellows Park at the end of the season.

== Personal life ==
Torrance worked as a ships' boilermaker in Scotland during the First World War. He later worked for a telephone company and died of cancer in July 1949.
