= Sam Weaver =

English footballer and manager

Personal information
- Full name: Samuel Weaver
- Date of birth: 8 February 1909
- Place of birth: Pilsley, North East Derbyshire, England
- Date of death: 15 April 1985 (aged 76)
- Place of death: Basford, Nottinghamshire, England
- Height: 5 ft 9 1/2 in (1.77 m)
- Position: Left half

Youth career
- Pilsley

Senior career*
| Years | Team | Apps | (Gls) |
| 1926–1928 | Sutton Town | ? | (?) |
| 1928–1929 | Hull City | 48 | (5) |
| 1929–1936 | Newcastle United | 204 | (43) |
| 1936–1945 | Chelsea | 116 | (4) |
| 1945–1947 | Stockport County | 2 | (0) |

International career
| 1932–1933 | England | 3 | (0) |

Managerial career
- 1958–1960: Mansfield Town
- * Club domestic league appearances and goals

Samuel Weaver (8 February 1909 – 15 April 1985) was an English footballer who played as a half-back.

== Playing career ==
Weaver began his career at local side Pilsley from where he moved to Sutton Town. His performances for Town attracted the attention of Hull City and in March 1928 he moved to the Tigers for £50. In November 1929 he left Anlaby Road for Newcastle United, netting City a huge profit by moving for £2500. He proved a success at St James' Park, winning an FA Cup medal with the club in 1932. He also played three times for the England national team in 1932 and 1933 whilst at the club.

He moved to Chelsea in 1936 for £4166 and was at the club to 1945 although his career was interrupted by the Second World War. During the conflict he was a regular guest player for Leeds United during the 1942–43 season. He left Chelsea in December 1945 for Stockport County and retired in the 1947 close season. As a player Weaver was noted not only for aggression but also for his long throw-ins which reached up to 35 yards in length.

== Coaching ==
Following his retirement Weaver returned to Leeds to join the coaching staff. He left the club in June 1949 to take up a similar role at Millwall and remained in this position until January 1954. After a spell out of the game Weaver took on the role of coach at Mansfield Town in September 1955 before being promoted to the role of manager in June 1958 in succession to Charlie Mitten. He was dismissed in January 1960 during a season in which Mansfield were relegated from the Football League Third Division.

Following the appointment of Raich Carter as his successor Weaver made a surprise return to Mansfield the following month after Carter offered him the position of assistant trainer. Weaver continued in this role under Tommy Cummings before being made chief scout under Tommy Eggleston, a role in which he remained until he retired from football.

== Cricket ==
Alongside his football career Weaver also played first-class cricket for Somerset County Cricket Club and was masseur to the club from 1956.

== Honours ==
Newcastle United

- FA Cup: 1931–32
