= Bobby McKay =

Scottish footballer and manager

Personal information
- Full name: Robert McInnes McKay
- Date of birth: 2 September 1900
- Place of birth: Glasgow, Scotland
- Date of death: 24 May 1977 (aged 76)
- Place of death: Glasgow, Scotland
- Position: Inside right

Youth career
- Quarry Brae
- Parkhead White Rose

Senior career*
Years	Team	Apps	(Gls)
- Vale of Clyde
- Parkhead
- Neilston Victoria
1921–1925	Morton	142	(28)
1925–1926	Rangers	25	(7)
1926–1928	Newcastle United	28	(11)
1928–1930	Sunderland	49	(17)
1930–1932	Charlton Athletic	49	(8)
1932–1935	Bristol Rovers	91	(17)
1935–1936	Newport County		

International career
1925	Scottish Football League XI	1	(0)
1927	Scotland	1	(0)

Managerial career
- 1939: Dundee United
- 1947–1949: Ballymena United
- * Club domestic league appearances and goals

Robert McInnes McKay (2 September 1900 – 24 May 1977) was a Scottish football player and manager. He played for Morton, Rangers, Newcastle United, Sunderland, Charlton Athletic, Bristol Rovers and Newport County, and represented Scotland once. After retiring as a player, McKay managed Dundee United and Ballymena United.

== Career ==
McKay was a member of Morton's 1922 Scottish Cup-winning team in his first season as a professional before playing for Rangers. In November 1926, he signed for Newcastle United in a £2,750 deal, where he won the League championship that season, scoring a hat-trick on his debut. Two years later he transferred to Sunderland, moving between the Tyne–Wear derby clubs in an exchange deal with defender Bob Thomson. McKay won one Scotland cap in 1927 during his time with Newcastle.

McKay took his first steps into management with Dundee United in July 1939 but managed only four League matches before the outbreak of war caused the suspension of the competition in September 1939. When it was decided to abandon the League programme, McKay's contract was terminated and he left the club, just three months after arriving.

== Honours ==
Greenock Morton

- Scottish Cup: 1920–21

Newcastle United

- Football League: 1926–27
