= Paul Anthony Lee =

British lawyer and businessperson

Paul Lee OBE DL

Chairman, Horserace Betting Levy Board
- In office 1 October 2009 – 30 March 2020
- Prime Minister: Gordon Brown; David Cameron; Theresa May; Boris Johnson
- Minister: Ben Bradshaw (until 2010) Jeremy Hunt (2010–2012) Maria Miller (2012–2014); Sajid Javid (2014–2015); John Whittingdale (2015-2016) Karen Bradley (2016-2018); Matt Hancock (2018); Jeremy Wright (2018-2019); Nicky Morgan (2019-2020); Oliver Dowden (2020)
- Succeeded by: Paul Darling

Personal details
- Born: Paul Anthony Lee; January 1946 (age 80)

Paul Anthony Lee OBE DL (born January 1946) is a British lawyer and businessperson who from 2009 to 2020 was chairman of the Horserace Betting Levy Board.

== Career ==
Lee read law at Clare College, Cambridge and joined Addleshaw Sons & Latham, specialising in corporate finance. He became a managing partner at the firm in 1991, then senior partner in the post-merger Addleshaw Booth & Co in 1997, and finally a senior partner in Addleshaw Goddard in 2001, until he retired in May 2010.

Lee is a board member of the Confederation of British Industry, and was the Chairman of CBI North West. He has also served as Trustee and later Chairman of the Royal Exchange Theatre in Manchester (1991–2016), as the Chairman of the Feoffees of Chetham's School of Music, and on the boards of the Hallé Concerts Society, Opera North, the Northern Ballet, the University of Manchester, and other cultural institutions.

Lee was appointed as Chairman of the Horserace Betting Levy Board by the Secretary of State for Culture, Media and Sport starting from 1 October 2009, succeeding Robert Valentine Hughes. He was re-appointed for another four-year term starting in 2013.

Lee, a Deputy Lieutenant for Greater Manchester, served as the High Sheriff of Greater Manchester for 2014–15. He was appointed an Officer of the Order of the British Empire (OBE) in the 2020 Birthday Honours.

Government offices
Preceded by Robert Valentine Hughes	Chairman, Horserace Betting Levy Board; 2009–2020	Succeeded by Paul Darling

Honorary titles
Preceded by Paul Griffiths	High Sheriff of Greater Manchester; 2014–15	Succeeded by Sharman Birtles
