= Jimmy Richardson =

English footballer

Personal information
- Full name: James Robert Richardson
- Date of birth: 8 February 1911
- Place of birth: Ashington, Northumberland, England
- Date of death: 28 August 1964 (aged 53)
- Position: Forward

Senior career*
Years	Team	Apps	(Gls)
–1929	Blyth Spartans		
1929–1934	Newcastle United	136	(42)
1934–1937	Huddersfield Town	120	(32)
1937	Newcastle United	14	(4)
1937–1946	Millwall	55	(19)
1947	Leyton Orient	15	(0)

International career
1933	England	2	(2)
- * Club domestic league appearances and goals

James Robert Richardson (8 February 1911 – 28 August 1964) was an English footballer, best known for his time playing as a forward for Newcastle United.

== Club career ==
Richardson joined Newcastle in April 1928 from Blyth Spartans, making his debut at home to Blackburn Rovers on 4 September 1929,

Richardson played in the 1932 FA Cup Final at Wembley Stadium against Arsenal, in what became known as the "Over The Line" final. While United were 1–0 down, Richardson chased a ball down the wing to the goal line and crossed it to teammate Jack Allen who scored. The referee ruled that the ball had not gone out of play, even though photographic evidence later showed that the ball had actually crossed the line, and the goal stood. Newcastle later scored a second to win the game 2–1. The event is often cited as an example by those who believe video replays should be used in matches to help referees make decisions. In March 2003 his medal from that game sold for £6,462 in an auction at Christie's.

In October 1934, Richardson joined Huddersfield Town for a fee of £4,000. He returned to Newcastle United in 1937 and later played for Millwall and Leyton Orient before retiring.

== International career ==
He earned two caps for England, both in May 1933, against Italy and Switzerland.

== After football ==
After hanging up his boots, Richardson served as an assistant trainer with his last club, Leyton Orient, becoming a trainer between June 1951 and June 1955. He then became the assistant trainer at Millwall beginning in November 1956 but was compelled to retire on health grounds soon after.

On 28 August 1964, he died aged 53, at a hospital in Bexley after an illness.

== Honours ==
Newcastle United

- FA Cup: 1931–32
