= Roderick MacKenzie (British Army officer) =

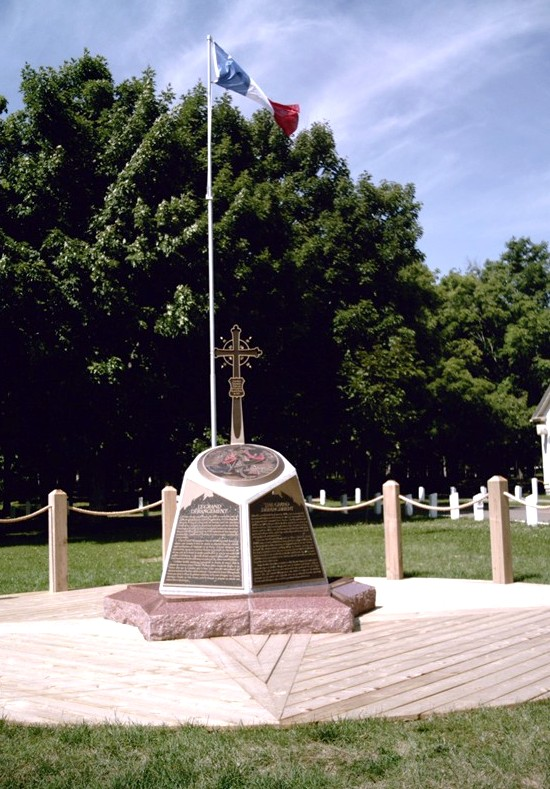
Monument commemorating the arrival at Caraquet of the Acadians, and their removal by British Army officer Roderick MacKenzie.

Roderick MacKenzie served as a British army officer in the First Highland Battalion of Foot. He appears to have been first remarked in the London Gazette on 18 January 1757, under Commandant Lieutenant Colonel Archibald Montgomery. It is unclear whether he "was badly wounded" in the capture of St. John's during the 1762 Battle of Signal Hill, as there were in the Gazette of 1757 three Captains and three Lieutenants with the same last name.

== Acadians removed from Nepisiguit ==
MacKenzie was commanding officer in charge of Fort Cumberland in 1761. As the Acadians in the Gulf of St. Lawrence had not ceased their attacks on British shipping, he was charged by Lieutenant Governor of Nova Scotia Jonathan Belcher with their removal. MacKenzie arrived at Nepisiguit with approximately 50 Highlanders on 29 October 1761, and did as he was ordered. The pregnant and the ill he did not remove, and he left a few able-bodied Acadians to help them.
