= Billy Fairhurst =

English footballer (1902–1979)

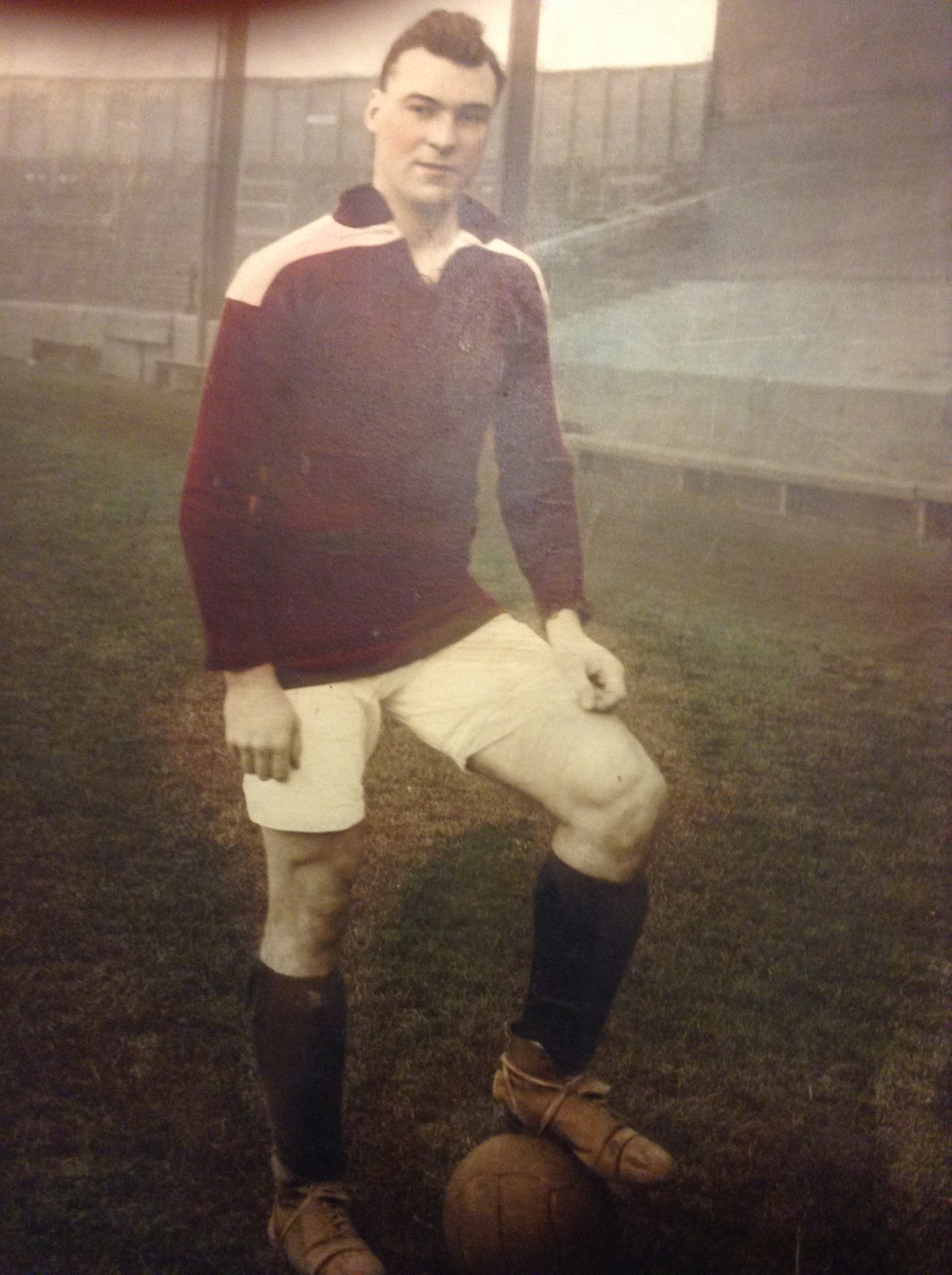
- Billy in Middlesbrough kit c.1926-28

Personal information
- Full name: William Shaw Fairhurst
- Date of birth: 1 October 1902
- Place of birth: Blyth, England
- Date of death: 27 February 1979 (aged 76)
- Place of death: Middlesbrough, England
- Height: 5 ft 8 1/2 in (1.74 m)
- Position: Left back

Senior career*
| Years | Team | Apps | (Gls) |
| 1924–1925 | Blyth Spartans | ? | (?) |
| 1925–1928 | Middlesbrough | 0 | (0) |
| 1928–1929 | Southport | 18 | (0) |
| 1929–1932 | Nelson | 76 | (0) |
| 1932–1933 | Northampton Town | 13 | (0) |
| 1933–1935 | Hartlepools United | 58 | (0) |
| 1935–1936 | Tranmere Rovers | 0 | (0) |
| Total | | 165 | (0) |
- * Club domestic league appearances and goals

William Shaw Fairhurst (1 October 1902 – 27 February 1979) was an English professional footballer who played as a left back. He played over 150 matches in the Football League. His brother, David, played for England and Newcastle United.

== Playing career ==
One of ten children of a former Blyth Spartans footballer (also William Shaw Fairhurst), William Shaw "Billy" Fairhurst was a sturdy left-back. He played in the North Eastern League during his three seasons with Middlesbrough, before moving to Southport, making his full league debut in 1928.

In 1929, he moved from Southport to play for Nelson. When Nelson dropped out of the League, he stayed on for a season in the Lancashire Combination whilst working as a local dairyman. Nelson's manager, English, who signed him for Nelson, also signed him for Northampton Town. His football career ended after a spell with Hartlepools United owing to an ulcerated leg.

== Life after football ==
Billy served in the Durham Light Infantry during the war and was one of the first (liberators) into Bergen-Belsen Concentration Camp.

After the war he settled with his wife, Mary (née Windross), in Middlesbrough. They had two children; Dorothy Mary and Eric William. Billy worked for many years at ICI (Billingham). He died of a heart attack, aged 76.
