= Horserace Betting Levy Board =

UK non-departmental public body and statutory levy board

The Horserace Betting Levy Board (HBLB), commonly abbreviated to the Levy Board, is a non-departmental public body of the Department for Culture, Media and Sport in the United Kingdom. It is a statutory body established by the Betting Levy Act 1961 and is now operating in accordance with the provisions of the Betting, Gaming and Lotteries Act 1963 (as amended). Unlike some other non-departmental public bodies, the Levy Board receives no central Government grant-in-aid or National Lottery funding. Instead, it is required by the Act to collect a statutory levy from the horse racing business of bookmakers which it then distributes for the improvement of horse racing and breeds of horses and for the advancement of veterinary science and education.

In the year to 31 March 2022, levy yield was £98m, an increase on the below average £82m in the previous year of 2020/21 (a reflection of the temporary suspension of racing during April and May 2020 following the COVID-19 outbreak.). Through 2020 and stretching into 2023, the Levy Board agreed to make contributions to racing significantly above normal, drawing on its reserves, meeting additional regulatory costs incurred in relation to staging race fixtures, issuing loans and increasing its grants to race prize money. The latter made up partially for the reduced contributions from racecourses arising from the absence of paying crowds at race meetings for most of 2020 and some of 2021. The Board also took a £21.5m loan from the government's Sport Survival Package in 2021 to help support the sport through the post-COVID period, with sums to be repaid by the Board annually until 2030. Levy yield in 2022/23 increased to £100m and there were further rises to £105m in 2023/24 and £109m in 2024/25.

In a normal year, the largest share of the levy is spent on race prize money, but it also provides funding for regulation and integrity services, racing and breeding industry training and education, projects for the benefit of the thoroughbred horse, loans to racecourses for capital projects and resources for various other activities pursuant to the organisation's statutory objectives.

== Chairs ==
- Field Marshal The Lord Harding (1963–1967)
- The Lord Wigg (1967–1972)
- Sir Stanley Raymond (1972–1974)
- Sir Desmond Plummer (1974–1980)
- Sir Ian Trethowan (1980–1991)
- Sir John Sparrow (1991–1998)
- Robert Hughes CBE (1998–2009)
- Paul Lee OBE (2009–2020)
- Paul Darling OBE KC (2020–2024)
- Anne Lambert CMG (acting 2024–2025)
- Roger Devlin (2025–present)
