= Dave Davidson (footballer) =

Scottish footballer

Personal information
- Full name: David Leighton Davidson
- Date of birth: 4 June 1905
- Place of birth: Aberdeen, Scotland
- Date of death: 30 May 1969 (aged 63)
- Height: 5 ft 10 in (1.78 m)
- Position: Centre half

Senior career*
Years	Team	Apps	(Gls)
- Garthdee
- Aberdeen Argyle
1927–1928	Forfar Athletic	39	(6)
1928–1930	Liverpool	58	(2)
1930–1937	Newcastle United	128	(0)
1937	Hartlepools United	6	(0)
- Gateshead
Total		231	(8)
- * Club domestic league appearances and goals

David Leighton Davidson (4 June 1905 – 30 May 1969) was a Scottish professional footballer who played as a centre half.

== Career ==
Born in Aberdeen in June 1905, Davidson played club football for Garthdee, Aberdeen Argyle, Forfar Athletic, Liverpool, Newcastle United, Hartlepools United and Gateshead.

== Honours ==
Newcastle United

- FA Cup: 1931–32
