= 1932 FA Cup final =

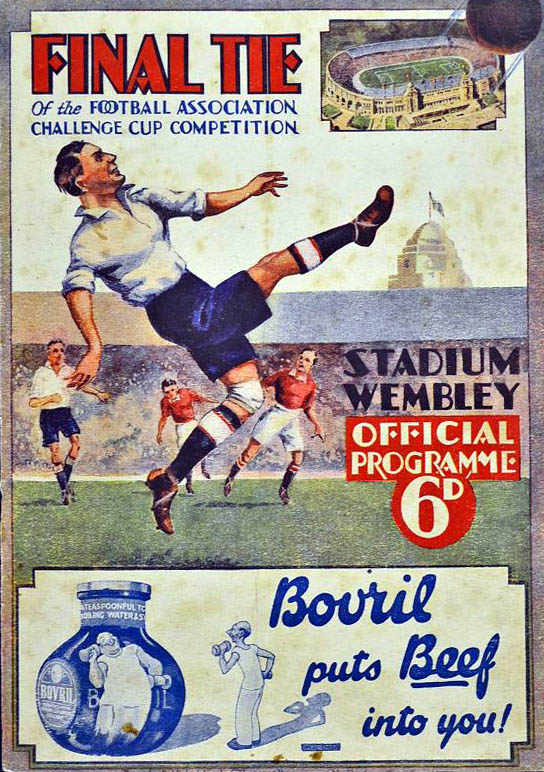
- Official programme
- Event: 1931–32 FA Cup
Newcastle United	Arsenal
2	1
- Date: 23 April 1932
- Venue: Wembley Stadium, London
- Referee: W. P. Harper
- Attendance: 92,298

The 1932 FA Cup final was contested by Newcastle United and Arsenal at Wembley Stadium in what became known as the "Over The Line" final. Newcastle won 2–1, both of their goals scored by Jack Allen.

Arsenal had led 1–0 with a Bob John goal, but Newcastle's equaliser came after a long ball that had appeared to pass over the goal line. Newcastle winger Jimmy Richardson crossed the ball back into the field and Allen levelled the match for the Magpies. The referee ruled that the ball had not gone out of play, but photographic evidence later suggested that the ball had crossed the line; the goal stood. Allen scored again in the second half to win the match 2–1.

Jimmy Richardson (top left) crossing the ball back into the Arsenal penalty box; the ball is fully over the goal-line at the moment he played it

== Match details ==
23 April 1932
15:00 BST

Newcastle United	2–1	Arsenal
Allen 38', 72'	(Report)	John 15'

Wembley Stadium, London
Attendance: 92,298
Referee: W. P. Harper

Newcastle United	Arsenal

GK	Albert McInroy
DF	Jimmy Nelson (c)
DF	David Fairhurst
MF	Roddie MacKenzie
MF	Dave Davidson
MF	Sam Weaver
FW	Jimmy Boyd
FW	Jimmy Richardson
FW	Jack Allen
FW	Harry McMenemy
FW	Tommy Lang
Manager: Andy Cunningham

GK	Frank Moss
DF	Tom Parker (c)
DF	Eddie Hapgood
MF	Charlie Jones
MF	Herbie Roberts
MF	George Male
FW	Joe Hulme
FW	David Jack
FW	Jack Lambert
FW	Cliff Bastin
FW	Bob John
Manager: Herbert Chapman

Match rules

- 90 minutes.
- 30 minutes of extra-time if necessary.
- Replay if scores still level.

== King George V's Presence ==
The match was also attended by King George V.

== Road to the Final ==
Arsenal's Road to the Final
Round	Opposition	Score
Third Round	Darwen	11–1
Fourth Round	Plymouth Argyle	4–2
Fifth Round	Portsmouth	2–0
Sixth Round	Huddersfield Town	1–0
Semi Final	Manchester City	1–0

Newcastle's Road to the Final
Round	Opposition	Score
Third Round	Blackpool	1-1
3R Replay	Blackpool	1–0
Fourth Round	Southport	1-1
4R Replay	Southport	1-1
4R Replay	Southport	9–0
Fifth Round	Leicester City	3–1
Sixth Round	Watford	5–0
Semi Final	Chelsea	2–1
