= Dave Bell =

Scottish footballer

Personal information
- Full name: David Bell
- Date of birth: 24 December 1909
- Place of birth: Gorebridge, Scotland
- Date of death: 16 April 1986 (aged 76)
- Place of death: Whitley Bay, Tyne and Wear, England
- Position: Defender

Youth career
- Wallyford Bluebell

Senior career*
Years	Team	Apps	(Gls)
1930–1934	Newcastle United	21	(1)
1934–1938	Derby County	52	(1)
1938–1950	Ipswich Town	171	(3)
- * Club domestic league appearances and goals

David Bell (24 December 1909 – 16 April 1986) was a Scottish professional footballer. He was born in Gorebridge. During his career he made over 150 appearances for Ipswich Town.
