= Jimmy Boyd (footballer) =

Scottish footballer

Personal information
- Full name: James Murray Boyd
- Date of birth: 29 April 1907
- Place of birth: Possilpark, Scotland
- Date of death: 22 March 1991 (aged 83)
- Height: 5 ft 8 in (1.73 m)
- Position: Outside right

Youth career
- Springburn Hibs

Senior career*
Years	Team	Apps	(Gls)
–	Petershill		
1924–1925	St Bernards	25	(2)
1925–1935	Newcastle United	184	(53)
1935–1937	Derby County		
1937	Bury		
1937–1938	Dundee	26	(4)
1938–1946	Grimsby Town		

International career
1933	Scotland	1	(0)
- * Club domestic league appearances and goals

James Murray Boyd (29 April 1907 – 22 March 1991) was a Scottish professional footballer, who played as an outside right.

Born in Glasgow, Boyd began his career with junior side Petershill before turning senior with Edinburgh side St Bernards. He joined Newcastle United in 1925 and stayed there for ten years, making 214 appearances and scoring 64 goals for the Magpies. During this period he helped his side win the FA Cup in 1932 and earned one cap for Scotland, in 1933; however, the result was a defeat to Ireland and he was one of five in the Scottish team who were not selected for international duty again.

Boyd joined Derby County for £1,000 in May 1935, before moving to Bury then Dundee, both in 1937. He joined Grimsby Town in 1938 and made guest appearances for Clapton Orient and Brighton and Hove Albion during the Second World War. He remained a registered Grimsby player until 1946. He scouted for Newcastle and Middlesbrough after his playing retirement.

== Honours ==
Newcastle United

- FA Cup: 1931–32
