= Ray Ellison =

English footballer (born 1950)

Personal information
- Full name: Raymond Ellison
- Date of birth: 31 December 1950 (age 75)
- Place of birth: Newcastle, England
- Height: 5 ft 7 in (1.70 m)
- Position: Full-back

Senior career*
Years	Team	Apps	(Gls)
1968–1973	Newcastle United	5	(0)
1973–1974	Sunderland	2	(0)
1974–1975	Torquay United	16	(0)
1975–1976	Workington	57	(3)
1976–1978	Gateshead United		
1978–1980	Tow Law Town		
1980–198?	Whitley Bay		
- * Club domestic league appearances and goals

Raymond Ellison (born 31 December 1950) was an English professional footballer who played as a full-back for Sunderland.
