= John McMenemy =

Scottish footballer

Personal information
- Date of birth: 9 February 1908
- Place of birth: Glasgow, Scotland
- Date of death: 5 February 1983 (aged 74)
- Place of death: Glasgow, Scotland
- Height: 1.75 m (5 ft 9 in)
- Position: Inside forward

Youth career
- St Roch's

Senior career*
Years	Team	Apps	(Gls)
1925–1928	Celtic	15	(2)
1928–1936	Motherwell	241	(62)
1936–1938	Partick Thistle	32	(4)
1938–1939	St Mirren	10	(2)
Total		298	(70)

International career
1931–1933	Scottish League XI	3	(0)
1933	Scotland	1	(0)
- * Club domestic league appearances and goals

John McMenemy (9 February 1908 – 5 February 1983) was a Scottish footballer, who played for Celtic, Motherwell, Partick Thistle, St Mirren and Scotland.

== Career ==
=== Club ===
Born in Glasgow, McMenemy played as an inside-right. He began his career with local Junior club St Roch's before signing for Celtic in 1925, aged 17. He remained a squad player during his three seasons with the club, making 15 league appearances. He played only one match in the Scottish Cup: the final of the 1926–27 edition, which his team won with a 3–1 victory over East Fife.

In 1928, McMenemy moved to fellow top-tier club Motherwell where he became an important member of the side in the most prominent period of their history under manager 'Sailor' Hunter. They finished third in the league in 1929 (albeit a huge margin behind Rangers), narrowed the gap to five points as runners-up in 1930, and to four in third place in 1931. In the 1931 Scottish Cup McMenemy played in another final, but Motherwell lost to his former club Celtic in a replay, having conceded a last-minute equaliser in the first match at Hampden Park despite leading by two goals (one by McMenemy).

The following season, 1931–32, saw Motherwell become league champions for the first and only time. In 1932–33 the Steelmen came close to success again, but finished second in the league and once more were defeated by Celtic in the Scottish Cup Final. They finished just behind champions Rangers and reached the Scottish Cup semi-finals in 1934, but had now peaked as a group, dropping down to seventh place the next season.

It is also worth noting that McMenemy's primary role was as a creator, and that the Motherwell centre forward Willie MacFadyen scored a huge number of league goals (194, including 52 in the title-winning campaign) during five consecutive seasons they played alongside one another.

in 1936 McMenemy, now aged 28, departed from Fir Park, signing for Partick Thistle for a fee of £1,000. In January 1938 he moved again within the Greater Glasgow area to play with St Mirren, being released in May 1939 after making 11 appearances for the Paisley club.

=== International ===
McMenemy received one cap for Scotland (replacing his brother who had pulled out of the squad due to injury), a 3–2 loss to Wales in Cardiff. He also appeared three times for the Scottish League XI, all during his spell with Motherwell.

== Personal life ==
John was the son of Celtic player Jimmy (winner of the Scottish Football League championship and the Scottish Cup several times each, the last in 1921) and the elder brother of Harry (winner of the FA Cup with Newcastle United in 1932) who both also played in the inside forward position. Another brother, Joe, featured for Strathclyde Juniors in the 1930s. They are distantly related to Lawrie McMenemy.

In 2016, his Motherwell championship medal was auctioned with the winning bidder loaning the item back to the club for display.
