= Roddie MacKenzie =

Scottish footballer

Personal information
- Full name: Roderick MacKenzie
- Date of birth: 22 May 1901
- Place of birth: Inverness, Scotland
- Position: Half back

Senior career*
Years	Team	Apps	(Gls)
1922–1935	Newcastle United	238	(6)
- * Club domestic league appearances and goals

Roderick "Roddie" MacKenzie (born 22 May 1901) was a Scottish professional footballer who played as a half back.

== Career ==
Born in Inverness, MacKenzie played for Newcastle United, making over 200 appearances in the English Football League.

== Honours ==
Newcastle United

- FA Cup: 1931–32
