= Ray Robinson (footballer) =

English footballer

Personal information
- Full name: Raymond Wilson Robinson
- Date of birth: 1895
- Place of birth: Blaydon-on-Tyne, England
- Date of death: 6 January 1964 (aged 68–69)
- Height: 5 ft 8 in (1.73 m)
- Position: Winger

Senior career*
Years	Team	Apps	(Gls)
1914–1919	Scotswood		
1919–1920	Newcastle United	27	(4)
1920–1921	Sunderland	10	(2)
1921–1922	Grimsby Town	9	(0)
1922	Sunderland	0	(0)
1922–1923	Eden Colliery Welfare		
1923–1924	Lancaster Town		
1924–1926	Liverpool Police		
1926–1928	Shirebrook		
1928–192?	Silverwood Colliery		
- * Club domestic league appearances and goals

Raymond Wilson Robinson (1895 – 6 January 1964) was an English professional footballer who played as a winger.
