= Bas-Caraquet, New Brunswick =

Bas-Caraquet
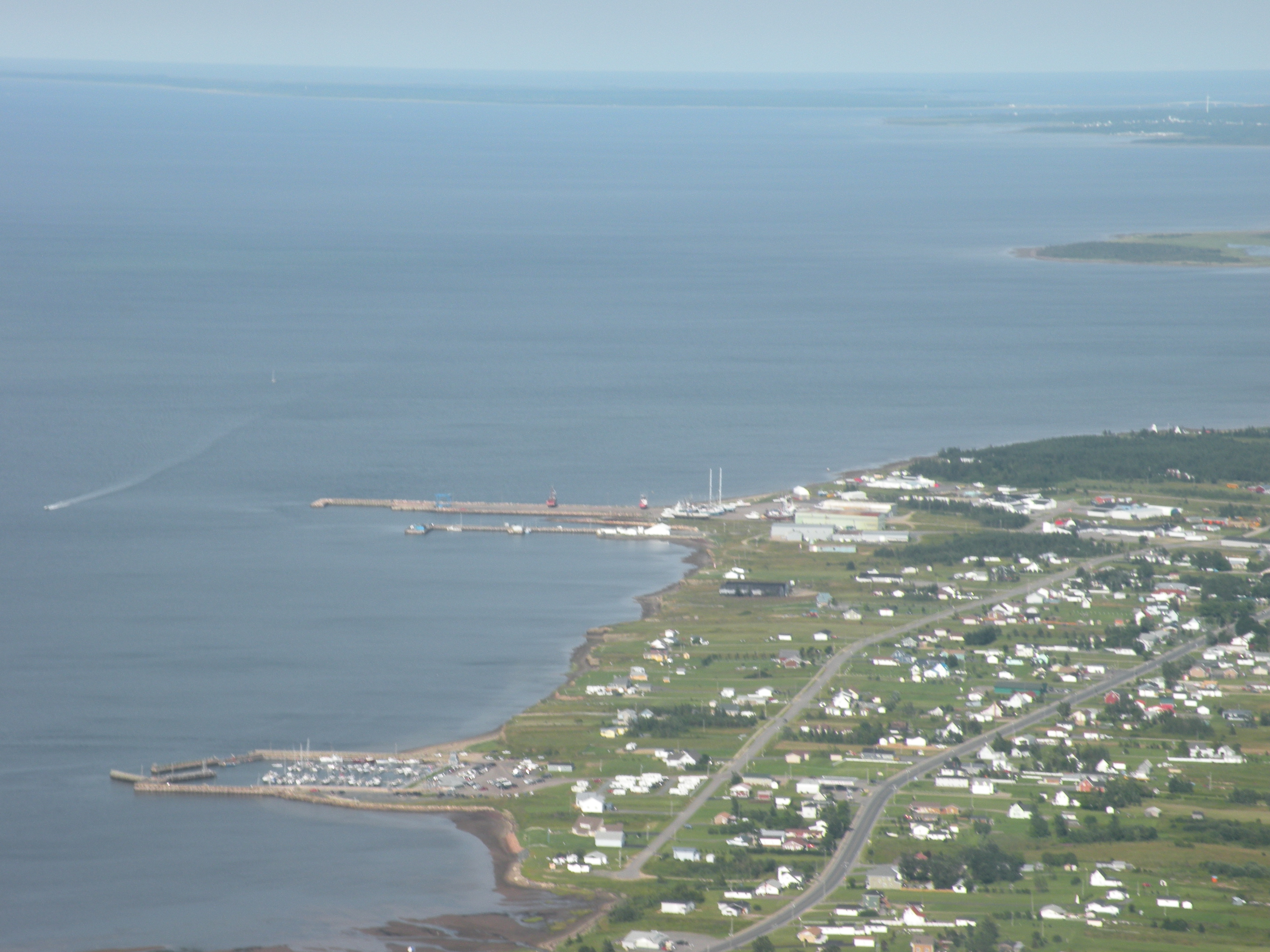
- Aerial view of Bas-Caraquet

- Location within New Brunswick
- Coordinates: 47°48′N 64°50′W
- Country: Canada
- Province: New Brunswick
- County: Gloucester County
- Parish: Caraquet
- Town: Caraquet
- Founded: 1735
- Incorporated: 9 November 1966
- Amalgamated: 1 January 2023

Area
  - Total: 30.93 km^{2} (11.94 sq mi)

Population (2021)
  - Total: 1,311
  - Density: 42.4/km^{2} (110/sq mi)
  - Change 2016-2021: ▲0.5%
  - Dwellings: 687
- Time zone: UTC-4 (AST)
  - Summer (DST): UTC-3 (ADT)
- Postal code(s): E1W
- Area code: 506
- Highways: None
- Website: www.bascaraquet.com

Bas-Caraquet (/ˌbɑːkərəˈkɛt/ BAH-kə-rə-KET) is a former village in Gloucester County, New Brunswick, Canada. It held village status prior to 2023 and is now part of the town of Caraquet.

== History ==
On 1 January 2023, Bas-Caraquet amalgamated with the town of Caraquet. Bas-Caraquet remains in official use.

== Geography ==
Situated on the Acadian Peninsula on the shore of Chaleur Bay, its name translates into "Lower Caraquet". It is located at the eastern entrance to Caraquet Harbour, adjacent to the town of Caraquet.

== Demographics ==
In the 2021 Census of Population conducted by Statistics Canada, Bas-Caraquet had a population of 1,311 living in 616 of its 687 total private dwellings, a change of 0.5% from its 2016 population of 1,305. With a land area of 30.93 km^{2} (11.94 sq mi), it had a population density of 42.4/km^{2} (109.8/sq mi) in 2021.

== Economy ==
Fishing is the village's principal industry.

== See also ==
- List of communities in New Brunswick
