= Jack Allen (footballer, born 1903) =

English footballer (1903–1957)

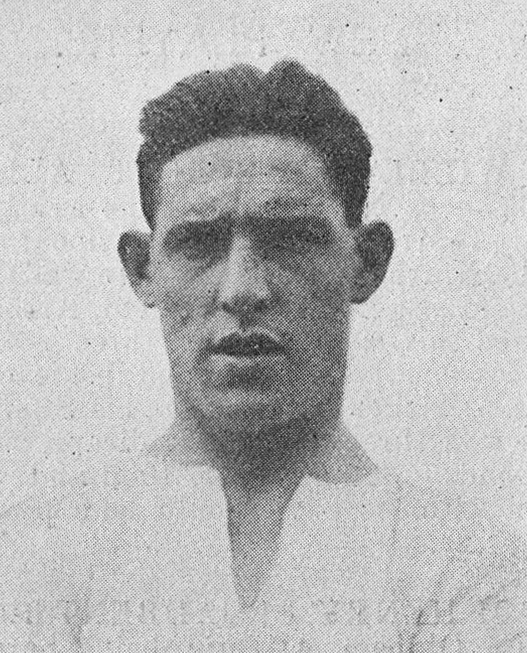
- Allen in 1924.

Personal information
- Full name: John William Alcroft Allen
- Date of birth: 31 January 1903
- Place of birth: Newburn, England
- Date of death: 19 November 1957 (aged 54)
- Place of death: Burnopfield, England
- Height: 5 ft 8 1/2 in (1.74 m)
- Positions: Forward; outside left

Youth career
- 1921–1922: Prudhoe Castle
- 1922–1924: Leeds United

Senior career*
Years	Team	Apps	(Gls)
1924	Leeds United	2	(0)
1924–1927	Brentford	54	(25)
1927–1931	Sheffield Wednesday	104	(76)
1931–1934	Newcastle United	81	(34)
1934–1935	Bristol Rovers	6	(2)
1935–1936	Gateshead	23	(12)
- Ashington
- * Club domestic league appearances and goals

John William Alcroft Allen (31 January 1903 – 19 November 1957) was an English professional football forward and outside left, who played in the Football League for Leeds United, Brentford, Sheffield Wednesday, Newcastle United, Bristol Rovers and Gateshead.

== Career ==
Born in Newcastle-upon-Tyne, he played for his home town club Newcastle United between 1931 and 1934. He played up front as a striker and managed to score 41 goals in 90 appearances for Newcastle. Perhaps the most important of those goals were scored in the 1932 FA Cup Final, in which Newcastle beat Arsenal 2–1 with both goals coming from Allen.

Allen is best remembered for his time at Sheffield Wednesday where he scored 33 goals in both 1928–29 and 1929–30 to help the Owls clinch back-to-back Division One titles.

Allen also played for Leeds United, Brentford, Bristol Rovers and Gateshead in his successful career.

== Personal life ==
Allen's brother Ralph was also a footballer. His grandson Paul Darling was Chair of the Horserace Betting Levy Board and another grandson Ian Darling is a British circuit judge. His Granddaughter Jacky is a director of the family business.

== Honours ==
Sheffield Wednesday

- Football League First Division: 1928–29, 1929–30

Newcastle United

- FA Cup: 1931–32
