= 1931–32 FA Cup =

Tournament details
- Country: England; Wales

Final positions
- Champions: Newcastle United (3rd title)
- Runners-up: Arsenal

The 1931–32 FA Cup was the 57th season of the world's oldest football cup competition, the Football Association Challenge Cup, commonly known as the FA Cup. Newcastle United won the competition for the third time, beating Arsenal 2–1 in the final at Wembley.

Matches were scheduled to be played at the stadium of the team named first on the date specified for each round, which was always a Saturday. Some matches, however, might be rescheduled for other days if there were clashes with games for other competitions or the weather was inclement. If scores were level after 90 minutes had been played, a replay would take place at the stadium of the second-named team later the same week. If the replayed match was drawn further replays would be held until a winner was determined. If scores were level after 90 minutes had been played in a replay, a 30-minute period of extra time would be played.

== Calendar ==
Round	Date
Extra preliminary round	Saturday 5 September 1931
Preliminary round	Saturday 19 September 1931
First round qualifying	Saturday 3 October 1931
Second round qualifying	Saturday 17 October 1931
Third round qualifying	Saturday 31 October 1931
Fourth round qualifying	Saturday 13 November 1931
First round proper	Saturday 28 November 1931
Second round proper	Saturday 12 December 1931
Third round proper	Saturday 9 January 1932
Fourth round proper	Saturday 23 January 1932
Fifth round proper	Saturday 13 February 1932
Sixth round proper	Saturday 27 March 1932
Semi-finals	Saturday 12 March 1932
Final	Saturday 23 April 1932

== Qualifying rounds ==
Most teams that were not members of the Football League competed in the qualifying rounds to secure one of 25 places available in the first round.

The 24 winners from the fourth qualifying round were West Stanley, Crook Town, Blyth Spartans, Lancaster Town, Darwen, Manchester Central, Yorkshire Amateur, Scunthorpe & Lindsey United, Gainsborough Trinity, Newark Town, Burton Town, Peterborough & Fletton United, Hayes, Enfield, Barnet, Chelmsford, Northfleet United, Folkestone, Tunbridge Wells Rangers, Guildford City, Wimbledon, Metropolitan Police, Nunhead and Yeovil & Petter's United.

Due to the uneven number of teams (49) contesting this season's fourth qualifying round, Bath City, having won through to that stage from the preliminary round, received a bye to the first round proper.

Those appearing in the main competition for the first time were Yorkshire Amateur, Burton Town, Enfield, Chelmsford and Metropolitan Police, while Darwen had last featured at this stage in the Intermediate Round of the 1903-04 tournament. Additionally, Burton was the first club from that town to qualify for the FA Cup competition proper since Burton United in 1906-07.

Blyth Spartans became the second club in the competition's history to progress from the extra preliminary round to the second round proper, defeating Shankhouse, Scotswood, Wallsend Boys Club, Walker Celtic, Jarrow, Stockton and Lancaster Town before losing to Bournemouth & Boscombe Athletic at Dean Court.

== First round proper ==
At this stage 42 clubs from the Football League Third Division North and South joined the 25 non-league clubs that came through the qualifying rounds. Southport and Exeter City were given byes to the third round. To make up the requisite number of matches, non-league Aldershot was given a bye to this round.

34 matches were scheduled to be played on Saturday, 28 November 1931. Eight were drawn and went to replays in the following midweek fixture, of which one went to two more replays. Notable in this round is the home win awarded to Burton Town due to Wigan Borough folding and resigning from the Football League just after the start of the season.

Tie no	Home team	Score	Away team	Date
1	Chester	4–1	Hartlepools United	28 November 1931
2	Darlington	1–0	Walsall	28 November 1931
3	Darwen	4–1	Peterborough & Fletton United	28 November 1931
4	Bournemouth & Boscombe Athletic	1–1	Northfleet United	28 November 1931
Replay	Northfleet United	0–1	Bournemouth & Boscombe Athletic	2 December 1931
5	Barnet	3–7	Queens Park Rangers	28 November 1931
6	Barrow	3–3	Doncaster Rovers	28 November 1931
Replay	Doncaster Rovers	1–1	Barrow	3 December 1931
Replay	Barrow	1–1	Doncaster Rovers	7 December 1931
Replay	Doncaster Rovers	1–0	Barrow	9 December 1931
7	Bath City	9–0	Nunhead	28 November 1931
8	Reading	0–1	Crystal Palace	28 November 1931
9	Folkestone	2–5	Brighton & Hove Albion	28 November 1931
10	Crewe Alexandra	2–2	Gainsborough Trinity	28 November 1931
Replay	Gainsborough Trinity	1–0	Crewe Alexandra	2 December 1931
11	Swindon Town	0–5	Luton Town	28 November 1931
12	Tranmere Rovers	3–0	West Stanley	28 November 1931
13	Fulham	2–0	Guildford City	28 November 1931
14	Crook Town	3–1	Stockport County	28 November 1931
15	Bristol Rovers	5–1	Gillingham	28 November 1931
16	Northampton Town	9–0	Metropolitan Police	28 November 1931
17	Coventry City	2–2	Clapton Orient	28 November 1931
Replay	Clapton Orient	2–0	Coventry City	3 December 1931
18	Hull City	4–1	Mansfield Town	28 November 1931
19	Tunbridge Wells Rangers	1–1	Brentford	28 November 1931
Replay	Brentford	2–1	Tunbridge Wells Rangers	2 December 1931
20	Wimbledon	1–3	Norwich City	28 November 1931
21	Lancaster Town	0–3	Blyth Spartans	28 November 1931
22	Scunthorpe & Lindsey United	2–1	Rochdale	28 November 1931
23	Cardiff City	8–0	Enfield	28 November 1931
24	Burton Town	Walkover - Home win	Wigan Borough	N/A
25	Yeovil & Petter's United	3–1	Hayes	28 November 1931
26	New Brighton	3–1	York City	28 November 1931
27	Torquay United	1–3	Southend United	28 November 1931
28	Newark Town	1–1	Halifax Town	28 November 1931
Replay	Halifax Town	2–1	Newark Town	2 December 1931
29	Yorkshire Amateur	1–3	Carlisle United	28 November 1931
30	Rotherham United	0–0	Accrington Stanley	28 November 1931
Replay	Accrington Stanley	5–0	Rotherham United	2 December 1931
31	Aldershot	7–0	Chelmsford	28 November 1931
32	Thames	2–2	Watford	28 November 1931
Replay	Watford	2–1	Thames	2 December 1931
33	Manchester Central	0–3	Lincoln City	28 November 1931
34	Gateshead	3–2	Wrexham	28 November 1931

== Second round proper ==
The matches were played on Saturday, 12 December 1931. Three matches were drawn, with replays taking place in the following midweek fixture.

Tie no	Home team	Score	Away team	Date
1	Darwen	2–1	Chester	12 December 1931
2	Bournemouth & Boscombe Athletic	1–0	Blyth Spartans	12 December 1931
3	Bath City	2–1	Crystal Palace	12 December 1931
4	Lincoln City	2–2	Luton Town	12 December 1931
Replay	Luton Town	4–1	Lincoln City	16 December 1931
5	Gainsborough Trinity	2–5	Watford	12 December 1931
6	Tranmere Rovers	2–0	Bristol Rovers	12 December 1931
7	Fulham	0–0	Yeovil & Petter's United	12 December 1931
Replay	Yeovil & Petter's United	2–5	Fulham	17 December 1931
8	Brentford	4–1	Norwich City	12 December 1931
9	Northampton Town	3–0	Southend United	12 December 1931
10	Brighton & Hove Albion	5–0	Doncaster Rovers	12 December 1931
11	Carlisle United	0–2	Darlington	12 December 1931
12	Scunthorpe & Lindsey United	1–4	Queens Park Rangers	12 December 1931
13	Cardiff City	4–0	Clapton Orient	12 December 1931
14	Burton Town	4–1	Gateshead	12 December 1931
15	Halifax Town	3–0	Accrington Stanley	12 December 1931
16	New Brighton Athletic	0–4	Hull City	12 December 1931
17	Aldershot	1–1	Crook Town	12 December 1931
Replay	Crook Town	1–0	Aldershot	16 December 1931

== Third round proper ==
The 44 First and Second Division clubs entered the competition at this stage, along with Southport, Exeter City and amateur side Corinthian. The matches were scheduled for Saturday, 9 January 1932. Twelve matches were drawn and went to replays in the following midweek fixture.

Darwen, Bath City, Burton Town and Crook Town were the last clubs from the qualifying rounds left in the competition, but all remaining non-league sides (including Corinthian) went out in this round.

Tie no	Home team	Score	Away team	Date
1	Birmingham	1–0	Bradford City	9 January 1932
2	Blackpool	1–1	Newcastle United	9 January 1932
Replay	Newcastle United	1–0	Blackpool	13 January 1932
3	Chesterfield	5–2	Nottingham Forest	9 January 1932
4	Darlington	1–1	Northampton Town	9 January 1932
Replay	Northampton Town	2–0	Darlington	14 January 1932
5	Burnley	0–4	Derby County	9 January 1932
6	Bury	2–1	Swansea Town	9 January 1932
7	Preston North End	0–0	Bolton Wanderers	9 January 1932
Replay	Bolton Wanderers	2–5	Preston North End	13 January 1932
8	Watford	1–1	Fulham	9 January 1932
Replay	Fulham	0–3	Watford	14 January 1932
9	Leicester City	7–0	Crook Town	9 January 1932
10	Notts County	2–2	Bristol City	9 January 1932
Replay	Bristol City	3–2	Notts County	13 January 1932
11	Grimsby Town	4–1	Exeter City	9 January 1932
12	Middlesbrough	1–1	Portsmouth	9 January 1932
Replay	Portsmouth	3–0	Middlesbrough	13 January 1932
13	West Bromwich Albion	1–2	Aston Villa	9 January 1932
14	Sunderland	0–0	Southampton	9 January 1932
Replay	Southampton	2–4	Sunderland	13 January 1932
15	Luton Town	1–2	Wolverhampton Wanderers	9 January 1932
16	Everton	1–2	Liverpool	9 January 1932
17	Sheffield United	2–1	Corinthian	9 January 1932
18	Tranmere Rovers	2–2	Chelsea	9 January 1932
Replay	Chelsea	5–3	Tranmere Rovers	13 January 1932
19	Tottenham Hotspur	2–2	Sheffield Wednesday	9 January 1932
Replay	Sheffield Wednesday	3–1	Tottenham Hotspur	13 January 1932
20	Queens Park Rangers	3–1	Leeds United	9 January 1932
21	Barnsley	0–0	Southport	9 January 1932
Replay	Southport	4–1	Barnsley	12 January 1932
22	Brentford	2–0	Bath City	9 January 1932
23	Brighton & Hove Albion	1–2	Port Vale	9 January 1932
24	Plymouth Argyle	4–1	Manchester United	9 January 1932
25	Millwall	2–3	Manchester City	9 January 1932
26	Oldham Athletic	1–1	Huddersfield Town	9 January 1932
Replay	Huddersfield Town	6–0	Oldham Athletic	13 January 1932
27	Bradford Park Avenue	2–0	Cardiff City	9 January 1932
28	Burton Town	0–4	Blackburn Rovers	9 January 1932
29	Halifax Town	1–3	Bournemouth & Boscombe Athletic	9 January 1932
30	Charlton Athletic	1–2	West Ham United	9 January 1932
31	Arsenal	11–1	Darwen	9 January 1932
32	Stoke City	3–0	Hull City	9 January 1932

== Fourth round proper ==
The matches were scheduled for Saturday, 23 January 1932. Three games were drawn and went to replays in the following midweek fixture, of which two went to second replays.

Tie no	Home team	Score	Away team	Date
1	Chesterfield	2–4	Liverpool	23 January 1932
2	Bury	3–1	Sheffield United	23 January 1932
3	Preston North End	2–0	Wolverhampton Wanderers	23 January 1932
4	Watford	2–1	Bristol City	23 January 1932
5	Sheffield Wednesday	7–0	Bournemouth & Boscombe Athletic	23 January 1932
6	Grimsby Town	2–1	Birmingham	23 January 1932
7	Sunderland	1–1	Stoke City	23 January 1932
Replay	Stoke City	1–1	Sunderland	28 January 1932
Replay	Stoke City	2–1	Sunderland	1 February 1932
8	Derby County	3–2	Blackburn Rovers	23 January 1932
9	Newcastle United	1–1	Southport	23 January 1932
Replay	Southport	1–1	Newcastle United	26 January 1932
Replay	Newcastle United	9–0	Southport	1 February 1932
10	Manchester City	6–1	Brentford	23 January 1932
11	Portsmouth	1–1	Aston Villa	23 January 1932
Replay	Aston Villa	0–1	Portsmouth	27 January 1932
12	Chelsea	3–1	West Ham United	23 January 1932
13	Bradford Park Avenue	4–2	Northampton Town	23 January 1932
14	Huddersfield Town	5–0	Queens Park Rangers	23 January 1932
15	Port Vale	1–2	Leicester City	23 January 1932
16	Arsenal	4–2	Plymouth Argyle	23 January 1932

== Fifth round proper ==
The matches were scheduled for Saturday, 13 February 1932. There was one replay, between Chelsea and Sheffield Wednesday, played in the next midweek fixture.

Tie no	Home team	Score	Away team	Date
1	Bury	3–0	Stoke City	13 February 1932
2	Liverpool	1–0	Grimsby Town	13 February 1932
3	Watford	1–0	Bradford Park Avenue	13 February 1932
4	Sheffield Wednesday	1–1	Chelsea	13 February 1932
Replay	Chelsea	2–0	Sheffield Wednesday	17 February 1932
5	Newcastle United	3–1	Leicester City	13 February 1932
6	Manchester City	3–0	Derby County	13 February 1932
7	Portsmouth	0–2	Arsenal	13 February 1932
8	Huddersfield Town	4–0	Preston North End	13 February 1932

== Sixth round proper ==
The four Sixth Round ties were scheduled to be played on Saturday, 27 February 1932. There were no replays.

Tie no	Home team	Score	Away team	Date
1	Bury	3–4	Manchester City	27 February 1932
2	Liverpool	0–2	Chelsea	27 February 1932
3	Newcastle United	5–0	Watford	27 February 1932
4	Huddersfield Town	0–1	Arsenal	27 February 1932

== Semi-finals ==
The semi-final matches were played on Saturday, 12 March 1932. Newcastle United and Arsenal won their matches to meet in the final at Wembley.

12 March 1932
15:00

Newcastle United	2–1	Chelsea

Leeds Road, Huddersfield

12 March 1932
15:00

Arsenal	1–0	Manchester City

Villa Park, Birmingham

== Final ==
The 1932 FA Cup Final was contested by Newcastle United and Arsenal at Wembley in what became known as the "Over The Line" final. Newcastle won 2–1, both of their goals scored by Jack Allen.

=== Match details ===
23 April 1932
15:00 BST

Newcastle United	2–1	Arsenal
Allen 38' 72'	(Report)	John 15'

Wembley, London
Attendance: 92,298
Referee: W. P. Harper

Newcastle United	Arsenal

== See also ==
- FA Cup Final Results 1872-
