= 1932–33 Huddersfield Town A.F.C. season =

Huddersfield Town
1932–33 season
- Chairman: Sir Amos Brook Hirst
- Manager: Clem Stephenson
- Stadium: Leeds Road
- Football League First Division: 6th
- FA Cup: Fourth round (eliminated by Blackpool)
- Top goalscorer: League: George McLean (11); All: George McLean (11)
- Highest home attendance: 23,198 vs Arsenal (17 December 1932)
- Lowest home attendance: 2,218 vs Sheffield United (1 February 1933)
- Biggest win: 4–0 vs Newcastle United (1 October 1932); 4–0 vs Newcastle United (11 February 1933); 4–0 vs Sheffield Wednesday (8 April 1933)
- Biggest defeat: 0–3 vs Blackburn Rovers (22 October 1932); 0–3 vs Manchester City (24 December 1932)

Huddersfield Town's 1932–33 campaign was a season of success under difficult circumstances for Huddersfield Town. With the previous season's top scorer Dave Mangnall missing for all but 3 matches of the season, their firepower was substantially weakened, the Terriers still managed to finish in 6th place, just 4 points behind 3rd placed Sheffield Wednesday.

== Squad at the start of the season ==
Note: Flags indicate national team as defined under FIFA eligibility rules; some limited exceptions apply. Players may hold more than one non-FIFA nationality.

Pos.	Nation	Player
GK	ENG	Hugh Turner
DF	ENG	Austen Campbell
DF	ENG	Billy Carr
DF	ENG	Norman Christie
DF	ENG	Bill Dodgin
DF	ENG	Billy Fogg
DF	ENG	Roy Goodall
DF	ENG	Reg Mountford
DF	ENG	George Roughton
DF	ENG	Bon Spence
DF	ENG	Alf Young

Pos.	Nation	Player
MF	ENG	Jack Blackwell
MF	ENG	Wilf Bott
MF	ENG	Dennis Jennings
MF	ENG	Charlie Luke
MF	ENG	Billy Smith
FW	ENG	Frank Bungay
FW	ENG	Ernie Hine
FW	ENG	Dave Mangnall
FW	SCO	George McLean
FW	ENG	Ernie Whittam

== Review ==
Following the previous season's 4th-place finish, many thought that the championship wasn't out of Town's reach, especially with 42-goal Dave Mangnall in their ranks. Unfortunately, Mangnall only managed to play 3 matches during the whole season. Other sources for goals needed to be found, but only George McLean scored more than 10 goals throughout the season. They still managed to finish 6th despite only scoring 66 goals, compared to the 118 scored by champions Arsenal.

== Squad at the end of the season ==
Note: Flags indicate national team as defined under FIFA eligibility rules; some limited exceptions apply. Players may hold more than one non-FIFA nationality.

Pos.	Nation	Player
GK	ENG	Hugh Turner
DF	ENG	Austen Campbell
DF	ENG	Billy Carr
DF	ENG	Norman Christie
DF	ENG	Billy Fogg
DF	ENG	Roy Goodall
DF	ENG	Reg Mountford
DF	ENG	George Roughton
DF	ENG	Bon Spence
DF	ENG	Ken Willingham

Pos.	Nation	Player
DF	ENG	Alf Young
MF	ENG	Len Beaumont
MF	ENG	Wilf Bott
MF	ENG	Charlie Luke
MF	ENG	Billy Smith
MF	WAL	Jackie Williams
FW	ENG	Dave Mangnall
FW	SCO	George McLean
FW	ENG	Jack Smith
FW	ENG	Ernie Whittam

== Results ==
=== Division One ===
Date	Opponents	Home/ Away	Result F - A	Scorers	Attendance	Position
27 August 1932	Portsmouth	A	0 - 2		23,213	19th
29 August 1932	Leicester City	H	4 - 1	Calvert (og), McLean (2), Hine	10,596	8th
3 September 1932	Chelsea	H	2 - 0	Hine (2)	13,032	6th
5 September 1932	Leicester City	A	1 - 3	B. Smith	15,594	7th
10 September 1932	Leeds United	A	1 - 1	Young	23,882	7th
17 September 1932	Sheffield United	A	2 - 1	Hine, Bott	16,773	7th
24 September 1932	Wolverhampton Wanderers	H	3 - 2	Goodall (pen), Young, McLean	13,028	7th
1 October 1932	Newcastle United	A	4 - 0	McLean, B. Smith (2), Whittam	24,766	4th
8 October 1932	Aston Villa	H	0 - 0		13,342	4th
15 October 1932	Middlesbrough	A	1 - 1	Whittam	11,065	5th
22 October 1932	Blackburn Rovers	H	0 - 3		11,357	7th
29 October 1932	Derby County	A	3 - 2	Bungay (2), H.T. Wilkes (og)	19,040	5th
5 November 1932	Sunderland	H	2 - 1	Murray (og), Bungay	13,253	5th
12 November 1932	Birmingham	A	2 - 0	Bungay (2)	10,000	4th
19 November 1932	West Bromwich Albion	H	2 - 1	Bott, McLean	12,008	4th
26 November 1932	Sheffield Wednesday	A	1 - 2	McLean	17,890	5th
3 December 1932	Blackpool	H	0 - 1		8,623	5th
10 December 1932	Everton	A	0 - 2		23,589	6th
17 December 1932	Arsenal	H	0 - 1		23,198	7th
24 December 1932	Manchester City	A	0 - 3		18,000	10th
26 December 1932	Bolton Wanderers	A	1 - 2	Goodall (pen)	23,967	10th
27 December 1932	Bolton Wanderers	H	2 - 1	McLean (2)	19,811	9th
31 December 1932	Portsmouth	H	2 - 2	Bott, Young	10,186	9th
7 January 1933	Chelsea	A	1 - 0	J. Smith	23,844	9th
21 January 1933	Leeds United	H	2 - 2	Goodall (pen), Luke	18,719	8th
1 February 1933	Sheffield United	H	1 - 0	Luke	2,218	8th
4 February 1933	Wolverhampton Wanderers	A	4 - 6	Luke (3), Williams	22,070	8th
11 February 1933	Newcastle United	H	4 - 0	Luke, Bott (2), J. Smith	10,868	8th
18 February 1933	Aston Villa	A	3 - 0	Williams, J. Smith (2)	25,243	7th
4 March 1933	Blackburn Rovers	A	2 - 4	Jones (og), Williams	7,788	7th
11 March 1933	Derby County	H	0 - 0		14,961	7th
15 March 1933	Middlesbrough	H	0 - 1		4,872	7th
18 March 1933	Sunderland	A	2 - 1	McLean, J. Smith	14,494	6th
25 March 1933	Birmingham	H	0 - 0		8,628	6th
1 April 1933	West Bromwich Albion	A	1 - 2	Williams	17,610	7th
8 April 1933	Sheffield Wednesday	H	4 - 0	Goodall (pen), McLean (2), J. Smith	11,998	6th
14 April 1933	Liverpool	A	2 - 2	Luke, Bott	35,000	6th
15 April 1933	Blackpool	A	1 - 1	Mangnall	22,867	6th
18 April 1933	Liverpool	H	3 - 1	Williams (2), Bott	13,420	6th
22 April 1933	Everton	H	0 - 0		11,629	6th
29 April 1933	Arsenal	A	2 - 2	J. Smith (2)	30,779	6th
6 May 1933	Manchester City	H	1 - 0	J. Smith	5,440	6th

=== FA Cup ===
Date	Round	Opponents	Home/ Away	Result F - A	Scorers	Attendance
14 January 1933	Round 3	Folkestone	H	2 - 0	Luke, McLean	13,384
28 January 1933	Round 4	Blackpool	A	0 - 2		16,187

== Appearances and goals ==
Name	Nationality	Position	League		FA Cup		Total	
Name	Nationality	Position	Apps	Goals	Apps	Goals	Apps	Goals
Len Beaumont	England	MF	1	0	0	0	1	0
Jack Blackwell	England	MF	1	0	0	0	1	0
Wilf Bott	England	MF	32	7	1	0	33	7
Frank Bungay	England	FW	17	5	1	0	18	5
Austen Campbell	England	DF	27	0	1	0	28	0
Billy Carr	England	DF	21	0	1	0	22	0
Norman Christie	England	DF	19	0	0	0	19	0
Bill Dodgin	England	DF	5	0	0	0	5	0
Billy Fogg	England	DF	9	0	1	0	10	0
Roy Goodall	England	DF	39	0	2	0	41	0
Ernie Hine	England	FW	23	4	2	0	25	4
Dennis Jennings	England	MF	5	0	0	0	5	0
Charlie Luke	England	FW	28	7	2	1	30	8
Dave Mangnall	England	FW	3	1	0	0	3	1
George McLean	Scotland	FW	41	11	2	0	43	11
Reg Mountford	England	DF	21	0	1	0	22	0
George Roughton	England	DF	23	0	1	0	24	0
Billy Smith	England	MF	17	3	0	0	17	3
Jack Smith	England	FW	15	9	0	0	15	9
Bon Spence	England	DF	1	0	0	0	1	0
Hugh Turner	England	GK	42	0	2	0	44	0
Ernie Whittam	England	FW	7	2	1	0	8	2
Jackie Williams	Wales	MF	17	5	0	0	17	5
Ken Willingham	England	DF	21	1	2	1	23	2
Alf Young	England	DF	27	3	2	0	29	3
