= 1933–34 Huddersfield Town A.F.C. season =

Huddersfield Town
1933–34 season
- Chairman: Sir Amos Brook Hirst
- Manager: Clem Stephenson
- Stadium: Leeds Road
- Football League First Division: 2nd
- FA Cup: Fourth round (eliminated by Northampton Town)
- Top goalscorer: League: George McLean (18); All: George McLean (20)
- Highest home attendance: 32,703 vs Tottenham Hotspur (26 December 1933)
- Lowest home attendance: 4,214 vs West Bromwich Albion (28 April 1934)
- Biggest win: 6–1 vs Chelsea (4 September 1933); 6–1 vs Sheffield United (30 September 1933)
- Biggest defeat: 0–3 vs Portsmouth (2 September 1933); 2–5 vs Wolverhampton Wanderers (23 September 1933); 0–3 vs Stoke City (29 January 1934); 0–3 vs Middlesbrough (21 April 1934)

Huddersfield Town's 1933–34 campaign was a season of triumph for a resurgent Huddersfield Town. Following the top 6 finishes in the previous 3 seasons, Town managed to finish in 2nd place in Division 1. Town would finish behind Arsenal, who win their second consecutive championship and would emulate Town's 1920s achievement the next season.

== Squad at the start of the season ==
Note: Flags indicate national team as defined under FIFA eligibility rules; some limited exceptions apply. Players may hold more than one non-FIFA nationality.

Pos.	Nation	Player
GK	ENG	Hugh Turner
DF	ENG	Austen Campbell
DF	ENG	Billy Carr
DF	ENG	Norman Christie
DF	ENG	Roy Goodall
DF	WAL	Gwyn Jones
DF	ENG	Reg Mountford
DF	ENG	George Roughton
DF	ENG	Willis Vaughton
DF	ENG	Ken Willingham
DF	ENG	Dick Witham

Pos.	Nation	Player
DF	ENG	Alf Young
MF	ENG	Len Beaumont
MF	ENG	Wilf Bott
MF	ENG	Charlie Luke
MF	ENG	Billy Smith
MF	WAL	Jackie Williams
FW	ENG	Billy Bottrill
FW	ENG	Dave Mangnall
FW	SCO	George McLean
FW	ENG	Jack Smith

== Review ==
After a resurgence in form in the last few seasons, Town's form continued its upturn in form. 5 of their players, Wilf Bott, Charlie Luke, Dave Mangnall, George McLean and Jack Smith all scored more than 10 goals during the season, helping Town become the top goalscorers in the league during the season. They were still in the title race until a defeat by Arsenal at Highbury in April. They would finish 2nd, just 3 points behind the Gunners, although if they had beaten them, then they would have won the title by a point.

== Squad at the end of the season ==
Note: Flags indicate national team as defined under FIFA eligibility rules; some limited exceptions apply. Players may hold more than one non-FIFA nationality.

Pos.	Nation	Player
GK	ENG	Hugh Turner
DF	ENG	Austen Campbell
DF	ENG	Billy Carr
DF	ENG	Norman Christie
DF	ENG	Benny Craig
DF	ENG	Roy Goodall
DF	WAL	Gwyn Jones
DF	ENG	Reg Mountford
DF	ENG	Reg Robinson
DF	ENG	George Roughton
DF	ENG	Willis Vaughton
DF	ENG	Ken Willingham

Pos.	Nation	Player
DF	ENG	Alf Young
MF	ENG	Len Beaumont
MF	ENG	Wilf Bott
MF	ENG	Charlie Luke
MF	ENG	Frank Lumsden
MF	ENG	Sid Rawlings
MF	WAL	Jackie Williams
FW	ENG	Billy Bottrill
FW	SCO	George McLean
FW	WAL	Seymour Morris
FW	ENG	Jack Smith

== Results ==
=== Division One ===
Date	Opponents	Home/ Away	Result F - A	Scorers	Attendance	Position
26 August 1933	Sunderland	H	2 - 1	McLean, J. Smith	11,417	4th
2 September 1933	Portsmouth	A	0 - 3		22,423	19th
4 September 1933	Chelsea	H	6 - 1	Mangnall, Luke, Bott, McLean (2), Campbell	7,523	5th
9 September 1933	Leeds United	H	0 - 0		19,061	10th
13 September 1933	Chelsea	A	3 - 2	Luke, McLean (2)	25,000	2nd
16 September 1933	Stoke City	H	2 - 2	Mangnall, McLean	14,431	2nd
23 September 1933	Wolverhampton Wanderers	A	2 - 5	Bott, Mangnall	25,498	6th
30 September 1933	Sheffield United	H	6 - 1	J. Smith (2), McLean (2), Bott (2)	10,208	3rd
7 October 1933	Aston Villa	A	3 - 4	McLean (2), Luke	18,858	5th
14 October 1933	Leicester City	H	5 - 1	McLean, Luke (2), Bott, B. Smith	10,312	3rd
21 October 1933	Derby County	A	1 - 1	McLean	20,865	3rd
28 October 1933	West Bromwich Albion	H	3 - 1	Luke (2), McLean	11,660	3rd
4 November 1933	Everton	A	1 - 0	B. Smith	31,708	3rd
11 November 1933	Sheffield Wednesday	H	3 - 2	McLean (2), Mangnall	19,894	3rd
18 November 1933	Manchester City	A	2 - 2	Mangnall, Luke	30,000	3rd
25 November 1933	Arsenal	H	0 - 1		29,667	3rd
2 December 1933	Newcastle United	A	3 - 3	Bott, Mangnall, McLean	26,000	4th
9 December 1933	Middlesbrough	H	2 - 1	Campbell, Griffiths (og)	10,050	4th
16 December 1933	Blackburn Rovers	A	2 - 2	Mangnall (2)	10,779	5th
23 December 1933	Birmingham	H	0 - 0		9,809	4th
25 December 1933	Tottenham Hotspur	A	3 - 1	McLean, Luke (2)	53,950	3rd
26 December 1933	Tottenham Hotspur	H	2 - 0	Luke, Bott	32,703	2nd
30 December 1933	Sunderland	A	1 - 1	J. Smith	19,557	3rd
6 January 1934	Portsmouth	H	4 - 0	J. Smith, Bott, Luke, B. Smith	11,741	3rd
20 January 1934	Leeds United	A	1 - 1	Mangnall	24,957	3rd
29 January 1934	Stoke City	A	0 - 3		11,319	3rd
3 February 1934	Wolverhampton Wanderers	H	3 - 1	McLean, Luke, J. Smith	10,607	3rd
10 February 1934	Sheffield United	A	4 - 1	B. Smith (2), Vaughton, Luke	19,988	3rd
21 February 1934	Aston Villa	H	2 - 1	Luke, J. Smith	8,025	2nd
24 February 1934	Leicester City	A	0 - 1		29,533	3rd
3 March 1934	Derby County	H	2 - 0	McLean, J. Smith	22,122	2nd
10 March 1934	West Bromwich Albion	A	3 - 2	J. Smith, Foulkes (og), Rawlings	16,286	1st
24 March 1934	Sheffield Wednesday	A	2 - 1	J. Smith, Bott	16,671	1st
30 March 1934	Liverpool	A	2 - 2	Luke (2)	35,000	2nd
31 March 1934	Manchester City	H	1 - 0	J. Smith	20,912	1st
3 April 1934	Liverpool	H	0 - 2		26,677	2nd
7 April 1934	Arsenal	A	1 - 3	J. Smith	55,930	2nd
14 April 1934	Newcastle United	H	4 - 1	J. Smith, Williams, Bott (2)	10,413	2nd
21 April 1934	Middlesbrough	A	0 - 3		11,042	2nd
25 April 1934	Everton	H	1 - 0	J. Smith	4,840	2nd
28 April 1934	Blackburn Rovers	H	5 - 3	Bottrill, Carr, J. Smith, Williams (2)	4,214	2nd
5 May 1934	Birmingham	A	3 - 1	Bott (2), Williams	19,442	2nd

=== FA Cup ===
Date	Round	Opponents	Home/ Away	Result F - A	Scorers	Attendance
13 January 1934	Round 3	Plymouth Argyle	A	1 - 1	McLean	44,526
17 January 1934	Round 3 Replay	Plymouth Argyle	H	6 - 2	Luke, Mangnall (3), Bott, McLean	18,597
27 January 1934	Round 4	Northampton Town	H	0 - 2		28,423

== Appearances and goals ==
Name	Nationality	Position	League		FA Cup		Total	
Name	Nationality	Position	Apps	Goals	Apps	Goals	Apps	Goals
Wilf Bott	England	MF	41	13	3	1	44	14
Billy Bottrill	England	MF	10	1	0	0	10	1
Austen Campbell	England	DF	35	2	3	0	38	2
Billy Carr	England	DF	8	1	1	0	9	1
Norman Christie	England	DF	18	0	0	0	18	0
Benny Craig	England	DF	1	0	0	0	1	0
Roy Goodall	England	DF	30	0	2	0	32	0
Gwyn Jones	Wales	DF	1	0	0	0	1	0
Charlie Luke	England	FW	42	17	3	1	45	18
Frank Lumsden	England	MF	1	0	0	0	1	0
Dave Mangnall	England	FW	16	10	2	3	18	13
George McLean	Scotland	FW	35	18	3	2	37	20
Seymour Morris	Wales	FW	3	0	0	0	3	0
Reg Mountford	England	DF	19	0	1	0	20	0
Sid Rawlings	England	MF	7	1	0	0	7	1
George Richardson	England	FW	1	0	0	0	1	0
Reg Robinson	England	DF	1	0	0	0	1	0
George Roughton	England	DF	29	0	3	0	32	0
Billy Smith	England	MF	18	5	1	0	19	5
Jack Smith	England	FW	24	15	1	0	25	15
Hugh Turner	England	GK	42	0	3	0	45	0
Willis Vaughton	England	DF	2	1	0	0	2	1
Jackie Williams	Wales	MF	12	4	2	0	14	4
Ken Willingham	England	DF	35	0	2	0	37	0
Dick Witham	England	DF	4	0	0	0	4	0
Alf Young	England	DF	27	0	3	0	30	0
