= 1931–32 Huddersfield Town A.F.C. season =

English association football team's year

Huddersfield Town
1931–32 season
- Chairman: Sir Amos Brook Hirst
- Manager: Clem Stephenson
- Stadium: Leeds Road
- Football League First Division: 4th
- FA Cup: Quarter-finals (eliminated by Arsenal)
- Top goalscorer: League: Dave Mangnall (33); All: Dave Mangnall (42)
- Highest home attendance: 67,037 vs Arsenal (27 February 1932)
- Lowest home attendance: 12,963 vs Manchester City (6 April 1932)
- Biggest win: 6–0 vs Derby County (21 November 1931); 6–0 vs Oldham Athletic (13 January 1932)
- Biggest defeat: 0–5 vs Birmingham (28 November 1931)

Huddersfield Town's 1931–32 campaign was a season that saw Town continue their impressive run of success under Clem Stephenson, by finishing 4th in Division 1. The season is mostly noted for two reasons: the impressive record of 42 goals scored by Dave Mangnall, a club record still to this day, and for the record crowd set during Town's sixth round FA Cup clash with Arsenal during the season.

== Squad at the start of the season ==
Note: Flags indicate national team as defined under FIFA eligibility rules; some limited exceptions apply. Players may hold more than one non-FIFA nationality.

Pos.	Nation	Player
GK	ENG	Hugh Turner
DF	ENG	Austen Campbell
DF	ENG	Billy Carr
DF	ENG	Norman Christie
DF	ENG	Bill Dodgin
DF	ENG	Billy Fogg
DF	ENG	Roy Goodall
DF	ENG	Reg Mountford
DF	ENG	George Roughton
DF	ENG	Bon Spence
DF	ENG	Tom Wilson
DF	ENG	Alf Young

Pos.	Nation	Player
MF	ENG	Wilf Bott
MF	ENG	George Crownshaw
MF	ENG	Dennis Jennings
MF	ENG	Gerry Kelly
MF	ENG	Billy Smith
FW	ENG	Harry Davies
FW	ENG	Bob Kelly
FW	ENG	Dave Mangnall
FW	SCO	George McLean
FW	ENG	Joe Robson
FW	ENG	Ernie Whittam

== Review ==
After finishing 5th the previous season, Town's reimbursed team carried their rich vein of form and managed an impressive run up the table, mainly thanks to the 33 league goals supplied by Dave Mangnall, which saw Town climb up to 4th place in the table. Combined with the 9 goals in the FA Cup, Mangnall's 42 goals give him the individual record of goals for a season in Town's history.

The season is also notable for Town's impressive FA Cup run. After wins over Oldham Athletic, Queens Park Rangers and Preston North End, Town met Herbert Chapman's Arsenal in the 6th round at Leeds Road. The match was watched by over 67,000 people and saw Town lose to a goal in the 2nd minute.

== Squad at the end of the season ==
Note: Flags indicate national team as defined under FIFA eligibility rules; some limited exceptions apply. Players may hold more than one non-FIFA nationality.

Pos.	Nation	Player
GK	ENG	George Thorpe
GK	ENG	Hugh Turner
DF	ENG	Austen Campbell
DF	ENG	Billy Carr
DF	ENG	Norman Christie
DF	ENG	Bill Dodgin
DF	ENG	Billy Fogg
DF	ENG	Roy Goodall
DF	ENG	Reg Mountford
DF	ENG	George Roughton
DF	ENG	Bon Spence
DF	ENG	Alf Young

Pos.	Nation	Player
MF	ENG	Jack Blackwell
MF	ENG	Wilf Bott
MF	ENG	George Crownshaw
MF	ENG	Dennis Jennings
MF	ENG	Charlie Luke
MF	ENG	Billy Smith
FW	ENG	Frank Bungay
FW	ENG	Bob Kelly
FW	ENG	Dave Mangnall
FW	SCO	George McLean
FW	ENG	Joe Robson
FW	ENG	Ernie Whittam

== Results ==
=== Division One ===
Date	Opponents	Home/ Away	Result F - A	Scorers	Attendance	Position
29 August 1931	Grimsby Town	H	1–1	B. Kelly	13,668	10th
31 August 1931	Aston Villa	H	1–1	Mangnall	13,226	9th
5 September 1931	Chelsea	A	1–0	Smith	42,961	5th
7 September 1931	Leicester City	H	2–1	Mangnall, B. Kelly	9,875	4th
12 September 1931	West Ham United	H	3–1	Jennings, McLean, Mangnall	11,986	2nd
19 September 1931	Sheffield Wednesday	A	1–4	Mangnall	24,326	6th
26 September 1931	Bolton Wanderers	H	2–0	B. Kelly (2, 1 pen)	12,901	5th
3 October 1931	Middlesbrough	A	0–1		16,366	8th
10 October 1931	West Bromwich Albion	H	2–2	Smith (2)	19,556	8th
15 October 1931	Leicester City	A	4–2	Black (og), McLean, Fogg, B. Kelly	11,420	5th
17 October 1931	Sheffield United	A	2–0	Mangnall, Jennings	14,300	3rd
24 October 1931	Sunderland	H	4–1	Mangnall (2), Smith, McLean	11,071	2nd
31 October 1931	Manchester City	A	0–3		21,332	4th
7 November 1931	Everton	H	0–0		17,605	4th
14 November 1931	Portsmouth	A	2–3	Jennings (2)	16,583	7th
21 November 1931	Derby County	H	6–0	Mangnall (5), McLean	11,638	4th
28 November 1931	Birmingham	A	0–5		18,059	6th
5 December 1931	Blackburn Rovers	H	1–1	Mangnall	9,628	7th
12 December 1931	Arsenal	A	1–1	Crownshaw	39,748	5th
19 December 1931	Blackpool	H	5–0	Crownshaw, Luke, Robson (2), B. Kelly	11,072	4th
25 December 1931	Newcastle United	A	1–2	Bott	43,493	5th
26 December 1931	Newcastle United	H	1–2	B. Kelly	25,424	8th
2 January 1932	Grimsby Town	A	4–1	McLean (2), Mangnall (2)	7,921	8th
16 January 1932	Chelsea	H	2–1	McLean, Mangnall	16,645	7th
30 January 1932	Sheffield Wednesday	H	6–1	Goodall (pen), Mangnall (3), McLean, Campbell	19,061	7th
1 February 1932	West Ham United	A	1–1	Mangnall	8,631	4th
6 February 1932	Bolton Wanderers	A	2–1	Mangnall, Luke	11,876	4th
17 February 1932	Middlesbrough	H	1–1	Mangnall	9,491	4th
20 February 1932	West Bromwich Albion	A	2–3	Mangnall, Smith	20,105	5th
2 March 1932	Sheffield United	H	2–2	Mangnall, Smith	7,501	5th
5 March 1932	Sunderland	A	3–1	Mangnall (2), Smith	29,549	5th
19 March 1932	Everton	A	1–4	Sagar (og)	30,748	5th
26 March 1932	Portsmouth	H	1–0	B. Kelly	12,901	6th
28 March 1932	Liverpool	A	3–0	Crownshaw, Bott, Mangnall	22,346	6th
29 March 1932	Liverpool	H	4–3	Mangnall (3), Bott	14,097	3rd
2 April 1932	Derby County	A	2–3	Crownshaw, Bott	13,108	5th
6 April 1932	Manchester City	H	1–0	Crownshaw	12,963	3rd
9 April 1932	Birmingham	H	1–1	Crownshaw	9,563	2nd
16 April 1932	Blackburn Rovers	A	0–3		10,782	3rd
27 April 1932	Arsenal	H	1–2	B. Kelly	13,370	6th
30 April 1932	Blackpool	A	0–2		15,675	6th
7 May 1932	Aston Villa	A	3–2	Mangnall (3)	12,464	4th

=== FA Cup ===
Date	Round	Opponents	Home/ Away	Result F - A	Scorers	Attendance
9 January 1932	Round 3	Oldham Athletic	A	1–1	Mangnall	30,607
13 January 1932	Round 3 Replay	Oldham Athletic	H	6–0	Mangnall (4), McLean, Luke	20,609
23 January 1932	Round 4	Queens Park Rangers	H	5–0	Luke (2), Mangnall (2), Campbell	31,394
13 February 1932	Round 5	Preston North End	H	4–0	Ward (og), Mangnall (2), Luke	44,291
27 February 1932	Round 6	Arsenal	H	0–1		67,037

== Appearances and goals ==
Name	Nationality	Position	League		FA Cup		Total	
Name	Nationality	Position	Apps	Goals	Apps	Goals	Apps	Goals
Jack Blackwell	England	MF	2	0	0	0	2	0
Wilf Bott	England	MF	14	4	1	0	15	1
Frank Bungay	England	FW	1	0	0	0	1	0
Austen Campbell	England	DF	36	1	5	1	41	2
Billy Carr	England	DF	33	0	4	0	37	0
Norman Christie	England	DF	5	0	1	0	6	0
George Crownshaw	England	FW	13	6	1	0	14	6
Harry Davies	England	FW	1	0	0	0	1	0
Bill Dodgin	England	DF	4	0	0	0	4	0
Billy Fogg	England	DF	11	1	0	0	11	1
Roy Goodall	England	DF	39	1	5	0	44	1
Dennis Jennings	England	MF	24	4	0	0	24	4
Bob Kelly	England	FW	40	9	5	0	45	9
Gerry Kelly	England	MF	4	0	0	0	4	0
Charlie Luke	England	FW	7	2	4	4	11	6
Dave Mangnall	England	FW	34	33	5	9	39	42
George McLean	Scotland	FW	28	8	5	1	33	9
Reg Mountford	England	DF	10	0	0	0	10	0
Joe Robson	England	FW	7	2	0	0	7	2
George Roughton	England	DF	18	0	1	0	19	0
Billy Smith	England	MF	31	7	4	0	35	7
Bon Spence	England	DF	15	0	4	0	19	0
George Thorpe	England	GK	8	0	0	0	8	0
Hugh Turner	England	GK	34	0	5	0	39	0
Ernie Whittam	England	FW	4	0	0	0	4	0
Tom Wilson	England	DF	1	0	0	0	1	0
Alf Young	England	DF	38	0	5	0	43	0
