= 1934–35 Huddersfield Town A.F.C. season =

Huddersfield Town
1934–35 season
- Chairman: Sir Amos Brook Hirst
- Manager: Clem Stephenson
- Stadium: Leeds Road
- Football League First Division: 16th
- FA Cup: Third round (eliminated by Portsmouth)
- Top goalscorer: League: Alf Lythgoe (21); All: Alf Lythgoe (23)
- Highest home attendance: 36,500 vs Arsenal (8 December 1934)
- Lowest home attendance: 8,744 vs West Bromwich Albion (6 March 1935)
- Biggest win: 4–1 vs Liverpool (10 November 1934)
- Biggest defeat: 0–5 vs Portsmouth (3 November 1934)

Huddersfield Town's 1934–35 campaign was a season of despair for Town. After the previous season's 2nd-place finish, some fans were even thinking that Town could deny Arsenal their chance to emulate their own successes in the mid-1920s of winning 3 titles in a row. Instead, a dreadful season saw Town finish in 16th place, only 5 points off the relegation zone.

== Squad at the start of the season ==
Note: Flags indicate national team as defined under FIFA eligibility rules; some limited exceptions apply. Players may hold more than one non-FIFA nationality.

Pos.	Nation	Player
GK	ENG	Bob Hesford
GK	ENG	Hugh Turner
DF	ENG	Jimmy Allen
DF	ENG	Albert Beech
DF	ENG	Austen Campbell
DF	ENG	Billy Carr
DF	ENG	Norman Christie
DF	ENG	Benny Craig
DF	ENG	Roy Goodall
DF	EIR	Bill Hayes
DF	ENG	Reg Mountford
DF	ENG	Reg Robinson

Pos.	Nation	Player
DF	ENG	George Roughton
DF	ENG	Ken Willingham
DF	ENG	Alf Young
MF	ENG	Len Beaumont
MF	ENG	Wilf Bott
MF	ENG	Charlie Luke
MF	ENG	Sid Rawlings
MF	WAL	Jackie Williams
FW	ENG	Billy Bottrill
FW	WAL	Seymour Morris
FW	ENG	Jack Smith

== Review ==
After the impressive 2nd-place finish the previous season, some fans were even thinking that Town were in a possible title fight with Arsenal, who were on course for a 3rd successive title, matching Town's achievement 8 years earlier. However, their first 8 games resulted in only 1 win, which at the time was Town's worst ever start to a season. Later in the season big drubbings including an 8–0 win over Liverpool and a 6–0 win over Blackburn Rovers, which included Alf Lythgoe scoring 5 of the goals, although a 5–0 loss to Portsmouth and a 5–1 home loss to Grimsby Town did not help Town's goal average. They finished in 16th place, only 5 points clear of Leicester City, who were relegated with Tottenham Hotspur.

== Squad at the end of the season ==
Note: Flags indicate national team as defined under FIFA eligibility rules; some limited exceptions apply. Players may hold more than one non-FIFA nationality.

Pos.	Nation	Player
GK	ENG	Bob Hesford
GK	ENG	Hugh Turner
DF	ENG	Albert Beech
DF	ENG	Alan Brown
DF	ENG	Buster Brown
DF	ENG	Austen Campbell
DF	ENG	Benny Craig
DF	ENG	Roy Goodall
DF	EIR	Bill Hayes
DF	ENG	Reg Mountford
DF	ENG	Reg Robinson
DF	ENG	George Roughton

Pos.	Nation	Player
DF	SCO	Jock Wightman
DF	ENG	Ken Willingham
DF	ENG	Alf Young
MF	SCO	George Anderson
MF	ENG	Len Beaumont
MF	SCO	Tommy Lang
MF	ENG	Charlie Luke
MF	WAL	Jackie Williams
FW	ENG	Alf Lythgoe
FW	ENG	Albert Malam
FW	ENG	Jimmy Richardson

== Results ==
=== Division One ===
Date	Opponents	Home/ Away	Result F - A	Scorers	Attendance	Position
25 August 1934	Sunderland	A	1 - 4	Williams	29,846	18th
27 August 1934	Derby County	H	1 - 0	Williams	8,878	10th
1 September 1934	Tottenham Hotspur	H	0 - 0		13,960	12th
5 September 1934	Derby County	A	1 - 4	Campbell	19,916	19th
8 September 1934	Preston North End	A	0 - 2		27,727	20th
15 September 1934	Grimsby Town	H	1 - 5	Betmead (og)	10,009	21st
22 September 1934	Everton	A	2 - 4	Luke, Rawlings	20,815	21st
29 September 1934	Leeds United	A	0 - 2		12,298	22nd
6 October 1934	Wolverhampton Wanderers	H	4 - 1	Williams, Malam (2, 1 pen), Richardson	11,552	21st
13 October 1934	Chelsea	A	1 - 2	Richardson	32,151	22nd
20 October 1934	West Bromwich Albion	A	1 - 4	Ball	19,250	22nd
27 October 1934	Sheffield Wednesday	H	4 - 0	Lythgoe, Malam, Williams, Willingham	14,913	22nd
3 November 1934	Portsmouth	A	0 - 5		18,636	22nd
10 November 1934	Liverpool	H	8 - 0	Richardson (2), Malam (3, 1 pen), Lythgoe, Luke, Bott	12,532	20th
17 November 1934	Manchester City	A	0 - 0		36,176	21st
24 November 1934	Middlesbrough	H	3 - 1	Luke (2), Stuart (og)	15,803	19th
1 December 1934	Blackburn Rovers	A	2 - 4	Lythgoe, Young	12,256	19th
8 December 1934	Arsenal	H	1 - 1	Morris	36,500	18th
15 December 1934	Birmingham	A	4 - 0	Malam (2), Lythgoe (2)	16,569	17th
22 December 1934	Stoke City	H	1 - 4	Luke	10,627	20th
25 December 1934	Leicester City	A	3 - 0	Malam (2), Morris	24,064	16th
26 December 1934	Leicester City	H	2 - 3	Morris, Young	25,728	18th
29 December 1934	Sunderland	H	0 - 3		24,009	20th
5 January 1935	Tottenham Hotspur	A	0 - 0		35,523	21st
19 January 1935	Preston North End	H	3 - 4	Malam, Lythgoe (2)	10,992	21st
2 February 1935	Everton	H	1 - 1	Lythgoe	14,687	21st
9 February 1935	Leeds United	H	3 - 1	Luke (3)	18,451	21st
16 February 1935	Wolverhampton Wanderers	A	3 - 2	Richardson, Lang, Anderson	16,519	19th
23 February 1935	Chelsea	H	3 - 0	Lang, Lythgoe, Luke	13,602	15th
6 March 1935	West Bromwich Albion	H	3 - 0	Lang, Lythgoe, Richardson	8,744	13th
9 March 1935	Sheffield Wednesday	A	1 - 1	B. Brown	19,207	15th
16 March 1935	Portsmouth	H	2 - 0	Lythgoe (2)	14,563	14th
23 March 1935	Liverpool	A	2 - 3	Beaumont, Willingham	18,000	15th
30 March 1935	Manchester City	H	3 - 0	Richardson, Anderson, Lythgoe	18,657	14th
2 April 1935	Grimsby Town	A	1 - 1	Anderson	8,073	14th
6 April 1935	Middlesbrough	A	1 - 2	Lythgoe	12,570	15th
13 April 1935	Blackburn Rovers	H	6 - 0	Lythgoe (5), Anderson	15,094	14th
19 April 1935	Aston Villa	A	1 - 1	Williams	27,505	15th
20 April 1935	Arsenal	A	0 - 1		41,892	15th
24 April 1935	Aston Villa	H	1 - 1	Lythgoe	9,288	15th
27 April 1935	Birmingham	H	2 - 2	Lythgoe, Anderson	11,027	15th
4 May 1935	Stoke City	A	0 - 2		9,986	16th

=== FA Cup ===
Date	Round	Opponents	Home/ Away	Result F - A	Scorers	Attendance
12 January 1935	Round 3	Portsmouth	A	1 - 1	Lythgoe	29,307
16 January 1935	Round 3 Replay	Portsmouth	H	2 - 3	Lythgoe, Lang	26,263

== Appearances and goals ==
Name	Nationality	Position	League		FA Cup		Total	
Name	Nationality	Position	Apps	Goals	Apps	Goals	Apps	Goals
Jimmy Allen	England	DF	1	0	0	0	1	0
George Anderson	Scotland	MF	14	4	0	0	14	4
Jack Ball	England	FW	5	1	0	0	5	1
Len Beaumont	England	MF	7	1	0	0	7	1
Albert Beech	England	DF	3	0	0	0	3	0
Wilf Bott	England	MF	19	1	0	0	19	1
Billy Bottrill	England	MF	2	0	0	0	2	0
Alan Brown	England	DF	2	0	0	0	2	0
Buster Brown	England	MF	1	1	0	0	1	1
Austen Campbell	England	DF	23	1	2	0	25	1
Billy Carr	England	DF	3	0	0	0	3	0
Norman Christie	England	DF	5	0	0	0	5	0
Benny Craig	England	DF	16	0	0	0	16	0
Roy Goodall	England	DF	13	0	2	0	15	0
Bill Hayes	Ireland	DF	1	0	0	0	1	0
Bob Hesford	England	GK	6	0	0	0	6	0
Tommy Lang	Scotland	MF	13	3	2	1	15	4
Charlie Luke	England	FW	30	9	2	0	32	9
Alf Lythgoe	England	FW	31	21	2	2	33	23
Albert Malam	England	FW	21	11	2	0	23	11
Seymour Morris	Wales	FW	3	3	0	0	3	3
Reg Mountford	England	DF	15	0	0	0	15	0
Sid Rawlings	England	MF	4	1	0	0	4	1
Jimmy Richardson	England	FW	31	8	2	0	33	8
Reg Robinson	England	DF	1	0	1	0	2	0
George Roughton	England	DF	38	0	2	0	40	0
Jack Smith	England	FW	6	0	0	0	6	0
Hugh Turner	England	GK	36	0	2	0	38	0
Jock Wightman	Scotland	DF	17	0	0	0	17	0
Jackie Williams	Wales	MF	19	5	0	0	19	5
Ken Willingham	England	DF	40	2	2	0	42	2
Alf Young	England	DF	36	2	1	0	37	2
