= 1930–31 Huddersfield Town A.F.C. season =

Huddersfield Town
1930–31 season
- Chairman: Sir Amos Brook Hirst
- Manager: Clem Stephenson
- Stadium: Leeds Road
- Football League First Division: 5th
- FA Cup: Third round (eliminated by Leeds United)
- Top goalscorer: League: Joe Robson (18); All: Joe Robson (18)
- Highest home attendance: 25,853 vs Chelsea (11 October 1930)
- Lowest home attendance: 4,091 vs Sunderland (16 March 1931)
- Biggest win: 10–1 vs Blackpool (13 December 1930)
- Biggest defeat: 1–6 vs Aston Villa (4 October 1930); 1–6 vs Aston Villa (7 February 1931)

Huddersfield Town's 1930–31 campaign was a season that saw Town start a revival in form, which saw them finish in the top 5 thanks primarily to the emergence of 2 new striking talents, Joe Robson, who was bought from Grimsby Town following Alex Jackson's departure to Chelsea and Town's own young prodigy Dave Mangnall. The season is also noted for Town's biggest ever win in a league match, 10–1 over Blackpool in December.

== Squad at the start of the season ==
Note: Flags indicate national team as defined under FIFA eligibility rules; some limited exceptions apply. Players may hold more than one non-FIFA nationality.

Pos.	Nation	Player
GK	ENG	Hugh Turner
DF	ENG	Austen Campbell
DF	ENG	Billy Carr
DF	ENG	Bill Dodgin
DF	ENG	Billy Fogg
DF	ENG	Roy Goodall
DF	ENG	Reg Mountford
DF	ENG	Levi Redfern
DF	ENG	George Roughton
DF	ENG	Bon Spence
DF	ENG	Tom Wilson
DF	ENG	Alf Young

Pos.	Nation	Player
MF	ENG	George Crownshaw
MF	SCO	Alex Jackson
MF	ENG	Gerry Kelly
MF	ENG	Jimmy Smailes
MF	ENG	Billy Smith
FW	ENG	Harry Davies
FW	ENG	Bob Kelly
FW	WAL	Wilf Lewis
FW	ENG	Dave Mangnall
FW	ENG	Harry Raw
FW	ENG	Ernie Whittam

== Review ==
The previous 2 seasons were only memorable for Town's 4th appearance in an FA Cup Final. Luckily, Clem Stephenson was on hand to turn the tide of failure back to success. There was a slight hiccup early on the season, when Alex Jackson left Leeds Road for Chelsea, just 4 games into the season. He had already scored 7 goals during the season including a hat-trick in his last match, a 6–0 win over Manchester United at Old Trafford.

Joe Robson was brought in from Grimsby Town and he started Town's push for Championship supremacy along with Town youngster Dave Mangnall, who between them scored 27 goals in the 35 league games that they started between them. Their form continued to improve during the season, which saw them finish in 5th place, but they were 18 points behind leaders Arsenal.

== Squad at the end of the season ==
Note: Flags indicate national team as defined under FIFA eligibility rules; some limited exceptions apply. Players may hold more than one non-FIFA nationality.

Pos.	Nation	Player
GK	ENG	Hugh Turner
DF	ENG	Austen Campbell
DF	ENG	Billy Carr
DF	ENG	Bill Dodgin
DF	ENG	Billy Fogg
DF	ENG	Roy Goodall
DF	ENG	Reg Mountford
DF	ENG	Levi Redfern
DF	ENG	George Roughton
DF	ENG	Bon Spence
DF	ENG	Tom Wilson
DF	ENG	Alf Young

Pos.	Nation	Player
MF	ENG	Wilf Bott
MF	ENG	George Crownshaw
MF	ENG	Dennis Jennings
MF	ENG	Gerry Kelly
MF	ENG	Billy Smith
FW	ENG	Harry Davies
FW	ENG	Bob Kelly
FW	ENG	Dave Mangnall
FW	SCO	George McLean
FW	ENG	Joe Robson
FW	ENG	Ernie Whittam

== Results ==
=== Division One ===
Date	Opponents	Home/ Away	Result F - A	Scorers	Attendance	Position
30 August 1930	West Ham United	A	1 - 2	Jackson	18,023	16th
1 September 1930	Grimsby Town	H	2 - 2	Jackson (2)	11,690	15th
6 September 1930	Bolton Wanderers	H	3 - 2	Jackson, G. Kelly, Campbell	15,018	9th
10 September 1930	Manchester United	A	6 - 0	G. Kelly (3), Jackson (3)	11,836	5th
13 September 1930	Liverpool	A	3 - 1	Smailes, Robson, G. Kelly	31,738	4th
15 September 1930	Manchester United	H	3 - 0	B. Kelly, Robson, Redfern	14,028	3rd
20 September 1930	Middlesbrough	H	2 - 2	B. Kelly, Robson	17,503	4th
27 September 1930	Leeds United	A	2 - 1	Smailes (2)	30,265	3rd
4 October 1930	Aston Villa	A	1 - 6	Mangnall	22,177	4th
11 October 1930	Chelsea	H	1 - 1	Davies	25,853	6th
18 October 1930	Leicester City	H	4 - 1	Smith, Davies (2), Crownshaw	15,125	4th
25 October 1930	Sunderland	A	2 - 4	Robson, B. Kelly	27,554	7th
1 November 1930	Arsenal	H	1 - 1	Smith	25,772	6th
8 November 1930	Portsmouth	A	2 - 2	Robson (pen), Smith	23,809	7th
15 November 1930	Sheffield United	H	1 - 1	Lewis	11,806	6th
22 November 1930	Blackburn Rovers	A	3 - 5	Robson (3)	10,556	7th
29 November 1930	Manchester City	H	1 - 1	Robson	14,118	7th
6 December 1930	Birmingham	A	0 - 2		16,036	7th
13 December 1930	Blackpool	H	10 - 1	Robson (3), McLean (4), B. Kelly, Smailes, Davies	11,932	7th
20 December 1930	Derby County	A	1 - 4	McLean	13,157	7th
26 December 1930	Newcastle United	H	0 - 3		15,956	10th
27 December 1930	West Ham United	H	2 - 0	Mangnall, McLean	13,830	8th
1 January 1931	Sheffield Wednesday	A	1 - 2	Mangnall	39,631	9th
3 January 1931	Bolton Wanderers	A	0 - 1		15,665	13th
17 January 1931	Liverpool	H	2 - 1	Robson (2)	9,864	10th
24 January 1931	Middlesbrough	A	3 - 2	B. Kelly (2), McLean	11,015	8th
31 January 1931	Leeds United	H	3 - 0	B. Kelly, Robson (2)	13,044	7th
7 February 1931	Aston Villa	H	1 - 6	Jennings	14,296	8th
18 February 1931	Chelsea	A	2 - 1	Mangnall, G. Kelly	17,546	7th
21 February 1931	Leicester City	A	2 - 1	Mangnall (2)	18,242	7th
7 March 1931	Arsenal	A	0 - 0		31,058	8th
14 March 1931	Portsmouth	H	1 - 3	Mangnall	11,594	9th
16 March 1931	Sunderland	H	2 - 0	B. Kelly, G. Kelly	4,091	7th
21 March 1931	Sheffield United	A	2 - 0	Mangnall (2)	16,689	7th
28 March 1931	Blackburn Rovers	H	1 - 1	J.J. Gorman (og)	8,144	7th
3 April 1931	Newcastle United	A	1 - 1	Whittam	24,262	7th
4 April 1931	Manchester City	A	1 - 0	Whittam	27,094	5th
7 April 1931	Sheffield Wednesday	H	1 - 1	Davies	22,601	6th
11 April 1931	Birmingham	H	1 - 0	Robson	15,000	5th
18 April 1931	Blackpool	A	1 - 1	Smith	15,111	6th
25 April 1931	Derby County	H	3 - 0	Davies (2), B. Kelly	5,325	4th
2 May 1931	Grimsby Town	A	1 - 2	Robson	16,533	5th

=== FA Cup ===
Date	Round	Opponents	Home/ Away	Result F - A	Scorers	Attendance
10 January 1931	Round 3	Leeds United	A	0 - 2		41,103

== Appearances and goals ==
Name	Nationality	Position	League		FA Cup		Total	
Name	Nationality	Position	Apps	Goals	Apps	Goals	Apps	Goals
Wilf Bott	England	MF	4	0	0	0	4	0
Austen Campbell	England	DF	39	1	0	0	39	1
Billy Carr	England	DF	22	0	1	0	23	0
George Crownshaw	England	FW	7	1	0	0	7	1
Harry Davies	England	FW	24	7	0	0	24	7
Bill Dodgin	England	DF	1	0	0	0	1	0
Billy Fogg	England	DF	7	0	0	0	7	0
Roy Goodall	England	DF	39	0	1	0	40	0
Alex Jackson	Scotland	FW	4	7	0	0	4	7
Dennis Jennings	England	MF	4	1	0	0	4	1
Bob Kelly	England	FW	37	9	1	0	38	9
Gerry Kelly	England	MF	19	8	1	0	20	8
Wilf Lewis	Wales	FW	3	1	0	0	3	1
Dave Mangnall	England	FW	12	9	0	0	12	9
George McLean	Scotland	FW	16	7	1	0	17	7
Reg Mountford	England	DF	6	0	0	0	6	0
Harry Raw	England	FW	9	0	0	0	9	0
Levi Redfern	England	DF	13	1	1	0	14	1
Joe Robson	England	FW	23	18	1	0	24	18
George Roughton	England	DF	30	0	0	0	30	0
Jimmy Smailes	England	MF	11	4	1	0	12	4
Billy Smith	England	MF	30	4	0	0	30	4
Bon Spence	England	DF	11	0	1	0	12	0
Hugh Turner	England	GK	42	0	1	0	43	0
Ernie Whittam	England	FW	7	2	0	0	7	2
Tom Wilson	England	DF	22	0	1	0	23	0
Alf Young	England	DF	20	0	0	0	20	0
