= 1928 in Wales =

- Centuries: 18th; 19th; 20th; 21st
- Decades: 1900s; 1910s; 1920s; 1930s; 1940s
- See also: List of years in Wales; Timeline of Welsh history 1928 in The United Kingdom Scotland Elsewhere

This article is about the particular significance of the year 1928 to Wales and its people.

== Incumbents ==
- Archbishop of Wales – Alfred George Edwards, Bishop of St Asaph
- Archdruid of the National Eisteddfod of Wales
  - Elfed (outgoing)
  - Pedrog (incoming)

== Events ==
- 29 March – The Grwyne Fawr reservoir is completed in the Brecon Beacons by the Abertillery & District Water Board, 16 years after the start of construction (work having been interrupted by World War I).
- 12 June – The Welsh National War Memorial is unveiled in Cardiff by The Prince of Wales.
- 18 June – Amelia Earhart lands near Burry Port, becoming the first woman passenger on a Transatlantic flight.
- December – Rapallo House, Llandudno, is handed over to the local council to be used as a museum, as a bequest from Francis Edouard Chardon.
- unknown dates
  - Dr John Williams establishes a hospital at Durtlang in the Lushai Hills (Mizoram) of India.
  - The Campaign for the Protection of Rural Wales is founded by Clough Williams-Ellis.
  - The community of Benedictine monks leaves Caldey Island for Prinknash Abbey. They are replaced at Caldey by a Cistercian order in 1929.
  - Douglas Cochrane, 12th Earl of Dundonald, buys Gwrych Castle for £78,000.
  - The Cardiff Station Orchestra, predecessor of the BBC National Orchestra of Wales, is formed.
  - The Brynmawr Experiment, a Quaker-led social relief scheme, begins.

== Arts and literature ==
- October – Eric Gill and members of his artistic community leave Capel-y-ffin for Speen, Buckinghamshire.
- Sir William Llewellyn is the first Welshman to become President of the Royal Academy of Arts.

=== Awards ===
- National Eisteddfod of Wales (held in Treorchy):
  - Chair – withheld
  - Crown – Caradog Prichard

=== New books ===
==== English language ====
- Dorothy Edwards – Winter Sonata
- Hilda Vaughan – The Invader: a tale of adventure and passion

==== Welsh language ====
- Moelona – Breuddwydion Myfanwy
- T. H. Parry-Williams – Ysgrifau
- Iorwerth Peate – Y Cawg Aur a cherddi eraill
- Richard Thomas – David Williams, y Piwritan

=== Music ===
- David Evans
  - Concerto for String Orchestra
  - Incidental music for Alcestis (unpublished)

== Film ==
- The Truth Game, starring Ivor Novello

== Broadcasting ==
- Isaac J. Williams presents Travel Talks on Art

== Sport ==
- Badminton – The Welsh Badminton Union is formed.
- Boxing – Welsh Bantamweight champion Tosh Powell dies after a fight with Billy Housego in Liverpool.
- Football – The 1928 Welsh Cup Final is contested by Bangor and Cardiff City at Farrar Road Stadium, Bangor, and ends in a 2–0 victory for Cardiff.
- Yachting – The North Wales Cruising Club is formed.

== Births ==
- 2 January – Dai Royston Bevan, rugby player (d. 2008)
- 1 February – Sam Edwards, physicist (d. 2015)
- 8 February – Osian Ellis, harpist (d. 2021)
- 9 February – Gruffydd Evans, Baron Evans of Claughton, solicitor and politician (d. 1992)
- 23 February – Dai Francis, baritone minstrel singer (d. 2003)
- 6 March – Glyn Owen, actor (d. 2004)
- 9 April – Albert Gubay, businessman (d. 2016)
- 27 April
  - Selwyn Hughes, clergyman and writer (d. 2006)
  - Hubert Rees, television character actor (d. 2009)
- 7 June – Dave Bowen, football player and manager (d. 1995)
- 9 June – R. Geraint Gruffydd, academic and theologian (d. 2015)
- 19 June – Ray Powell, politician (d. 2001)
- 11 July – Greville Janner, Labour MP and lawyer (d. 2015)
- 14 July – Haydn Morris, international rugby union player (d. 2021)
- 26 July – Bernice Rubens, novelist (d. 2004)
- 7 August – Gwilym Roberts, politician (d. 2018)
- 12 August – Roy Davies, cricketer (d. 2013)
- 14 August – Sid Judd, Wales international rugby union player (d. 1959)
- 1 September – Emrys James, actor (d. 1989)
- 17 September – Dafydd Orwig, educationist (d. 1996)
- 23 October – Keith Jones, footballer (d. 2007)
- 20 November – John Disley, distance runner (d. 2016)
- 19 December – Gwyn Rowlands, rugby union international (d. 2010)

== Deaths ==
- 11 January – Joseph Bailey, 2nd Baron Glanusk, 63
- 21 March – Stanley L. Wood, illustrator, 61
- 14 April – Lewis Cobden Thomas, Wales international rugby player, 62
- 13 May – David John Thomas (Afan), composer and conductor, 47
- 19 May – Arthur Charles Fox-Davies, heraldry expert (of Welsh descent), 57
- 23 May – Henry Seymour Berry, 1st Baron Buckland, industrialist, 50 (head injury)
- 3 June – Tosh Powell, Welsh champion boxer, 20
- 21 June – Marie Novello, pianist, c. 30 (emphysema)
- 23 July – John Hinds, businessman and politician, 65
- 23 August – Daniel Davies, Bishop of Bangor, 64
- 30 August – Hugh Evan-Thomas, admiral, 65
- 6 September – Richard Ellis, librarian, 62
- 1 October – Lawrence Hugh Jenkins, judge, 70
- 3 December – Isaac Hughes (Craigfryn), poet and novelist, 76
- 13 December – Harry Jarman, Wales and British Lions international rugby union player, 34–35
- 29 December – George Boots, rugby player, 54
- date unknown – John Morgan Howell, local politician in Cardiganshire, 72/3

== See also ==
- 1928 in Northern Ireland
