= Gwyn Rowlands =

Wales international rugby union player

- Born: Gwyn Rowlands; 19 December 1928 Berkhamsted, Hertfordshire, England
- Died: 30 April 2010 (aged 81) Aylesbury, Buckinghamshire, England
- School: Berkhamsted School
- University: London Hospital
- Occupation: Doctor of Medicine

Rugby union career
- Position: Wing
Amateur team(s)
Years	Team	Apps	(Points)
- The London Hospital
–	London Welsh RFC		
–	The London Hospital		
–	Cardiff		
–	Royal Air Force		
International career
Years	Team	Apps	(Points)
1953–1956	Wales	4	(13)

Gwyn Rowlands (19 December 1928 – 30 April 2010) was an English-born rugby union wing, who played international rugby for the Wales national team. At club level he represented The London Hospital, London Welsh, Cardiff and the Royal Air Force.

== Rugby career ==
Gwyn Rowlands was born and educated in Berkhamsted, and had dual qualifications for both England and Wales. He had trials for England national team during the 1948/49 season, but was unsuccessful. He was then invited to trial for Wales in 1949. Rowlands would remember years later that when he was selected for the trials for both teams, the fallout devastated his parents' marriage. While on national service for the Royal Air Force at St Athan he accepted an invitation to join Cardiff Rugby Club. In 1953 he was part of the Cardiff team to face the touring New Zealand team. Rowlands was instrumental in a famous victory; his cross-kick set up the first Cardiff try, which was scored by Sid Judd, and then converted by Rowlands. His performance won him his first international cap for Wales, when he was brought into the side to face the same touring New Zealand team. He made a major contribution to the final result, scoring two conversions and a penalty goal in a 13–8 victory.

Rowlands played in three more internationals for Wales, with encounters against England and France as part of the 1953 Five Nations Championship and after a year break, was brought in to face France again in 1956.

== After rugby ==
He went on to become a doctor in his hometown of Berkhamsted, taking over his father's general practice and developing a reputation for diagnosing illnesses. Rowlands lived with his wife for the remainder of his life in Berkhamsted town centre, and died at Stoke Mandeville Hospital near Aylesbury on 30 April 2010.
