= Bill Dodgin Sr. =

English footballer, manager, and coach

Personal information
- Full name: William Dodgin
- Date of birth: 17 April 1909
- Place of birth: Gateshead, England
- Date of death: 16 October 1999 (aged 90)
- Place of death: Godalming, England
- Height: 5 ft 10 in (1.78 m)
- Position: Wing half

Youth career
- Gateshead High Fell
- Wallsend
- Kirkley & Waveney
- Lowestoft Town

Senior career*
Years	Team	Apps	(Gls)
1928–1932	Huddersfield Town	10	(0)
1932–1934	Lincoln City	46	(1)
1934–1936	Charlton Athletic	29	(0)
1936–1937	Bristol Rovers	30	(1)
1937–1939	Clapton Orient	62	(1)
1939–1946	Southampton	0	(0)
Total		177	(3)

Managerial career
- 1946–1949: Southampton
- 1949–1953: Fulham
- 1953–1957: Brentford
- 1957–1958: Sampdoria
- 1959–1960: Yiewsley
- 1969–1972: Bristol Rovers
- * Club domestic league appearances and goals

William Dodgin (17 April 1909 – 16 October 1999) was an English professional footballer who played as a left half and later worked as a manager, coach and scout.

== Football career ==
Dodgin played in the Football League, most notably for Clapton Orient and Lincoln City and after retiring, he turned to management with Southampton, Fulham, Brentford, Sampdoria and Yiewsley. Dodgin later served former club Bristol Rovers as a coach, chief scout (1961–1969, 1972–1979) and manager (1969–1972). After his retirement as Bristol Rovers' chief scout in 1979, Dodgin served as a consultant at Brentford, where his son Bill Dodgin Jr. was manager. He retired from football in 1981.

== Personal life ==
Bill Dodgin's brother Norman and son Bill also became footballers, with the latter playing under his father's management at Southampton and Fulham. Prior to turning professional with Huddersfield Town in 1928, he worked as a miner. During the Second World War he worked at an aircraft factory in Hamble-le-Rice and played football for their works team Folland Aircraft. While manager of Yiewsley, he ran a tobacconists and sweet shop in Byfleet.

== Career statistics ==
Appearances and goals by club, season and competition
Club	Season	League			FA Cup		Total	
Club	Season	Division	Apps	Goals	Apps	Goals	Apps	Goals
Huddersfield Town	1930–31	First Division	1	0	0	0	1	0
Huddersfield Town	1931–32	First Division	4	0	0	0	4	0
Huddersfield Town	1932–33	First Division	5	0	0	0	5	0
Huddersfield Town	Total		10	0	0	0	10	0
Southampton	1945–46	―			4	0	4	0
Career total			10	0	4	0	14	0

== Honours ==
- Bell's Merit Award
