= Jack Blackwell =

English footballer (1909–2001)

Personal information
- Date of birth: 29 October 1909
- Place of birth: Ecclesall, Sheffield, England
- Date of death: 25 October 2001 (aged 91)
- Position: Inside forward

Youth career
- Chapel-en-le-Frith

Senior career*
Years	Team	Apps	(Gls)
1931–1932	Huddersfield Town	3	(0)
1932–1934	Charlton Athletic	34	(7)
1934–1935	Port Vale	24	(5)
1935–1936	Boston United	32	(9)
1936–1937	Ipswich Town	20	(8)
- Bridlington Town
Total		113+	(29+)
- * Club domestic league appearances and goals

Jack Blackwell (28 October 1909 – 25 October 2001) was an English footballer who played at inside-forward for Huddersfield Town, Charlton Athletic, Port Vale, Boston United, Ipswich Town, and Bridlington Town. He helped Ipswich to the Southern League title in 1936–37.

== Career ==
Blackwell played for Chapel-en-le-Frith before joining Huddersfield Town in October 1931. He appeared in two First Division games in 1931–32 and featured once at Leeds Road in 1932–33. He finished the season though with Charlton Athletic, who were relegated out of the Second Division in last place. The "Addicks" finished fifth in the Third Division South in 1933–34, but Blackwell had already left The Valley for Port Vale in February 1934. He scored a brace on his debut in a 5–1 win over Millwall at the Old Recreation Ground on 24 February. However, he only found the net once in the remaining eleven games of the 1933–34 campaign. He picked up a serious knee injury in August 1934, which sidelined him for four months. He never regained his first-team spot and was instead released in May 1935, having scored twice in 12 games in 1934–35. He spent the 1935–36 season at York Street with non-League Boston United. He spent the 1936–37 season with Ipswich Town; scoring 15 goals in 28 games across all competitions, he helped the "Tractor Boys" to win the Southern League title. After leaving Portman Road, he later appeared for Bridlington Town.

== Career statistics ==
Appearances and goals by club, season and competition
Club	Season	League			FA Cup		Other		Total	
Club	Season	Division	Apps	Goals	Apps	Goals	Apps	Goals	Apps	Goals
Huddersfield Town	1931–32	First Division	2	0	0	0	0	0	2	0
Huddersfield Town	1932–33	First Division	1	0	0	0	0	0	1	0
Huddersfield Town	Total		3	0	0	0	0	0	3	0
Charlton Athletic	1932–33	Second Division	27	5	1	1	0	0	28	6
Charlton Athletic	1933–34	Third Division South	7	2	3	0	1	0	11	2
Charlton Athletic	Total		34	7	4	1	1	0	39	8
Port Vale	1933–34	Second Division	12	3	0	0	0	0	12	3
Port Vale	1934–35	Second Division	12	2	1	0	0	0	13	2
Port Vale	Total		24	5	1	0	0	0	25	5
Boston United	1935–36	Midland League	32	9	1	1	11	7	44	17

== Honours ==
Ipswich Town

- Southern Football League: 1936–37
