= Frank Lumsden =

English footballer

Personal information
- Date of birth: 1913
- Place of birth: Sunderland, England
- Date of death: 1965 (aged 51–52)
- Height: 5 ft 6 1/2 in (1.69 m)
- Position: Winger

Senior career*
| Years | Team | Apps | (Gls) |
| 1933–1934 | Huddersfield Town | 1 | (0) |
| 1935–1937 | Queens Park Rangers | 38 | (8) |
| 1937–1938 | Burnley | 1 | (0) |
- * Club domestic league appearances and goals

Francis L. Lumsden (1913–1965) was a professional footballer, who played for Huddersfield Town, Queens Park Rangers and Burnley.
