= George Richardson (footballer, born 1912) =

English footballer

Personal information
- Date of birth: 12 December 1912
- Place of birth: Worksop, England
- Date of death: 1968 (aged 55–56)
- Height: 5 ft 10 in (1.78 m)
- Position: Striker

Senior career*
Years	Team	Apps	(Gls)
1933–1934	Huddersfield Town	1	(0)
1936–1938	Sheffield United	37	(9)
- * Club domestic league appearances and goals

George Richardson (12 December 1912 – 1968) was a professional footballer, who played for Huddersfield Town and Sheffield United. He was born in Worksop, Nottinghamshire.
