= Gwyn Jones (footballer, born 1912) =

Welsh footballer

Personal information
- Full name: Gwyn Thomas Jones
- Date of birth: February 1912
- Place of birth: Troed-y-rhiw, Wales
- Date of death: 1968
- Height: 6 ft 1/2 in (1.84 m)
- Position: Defender

Senior career*
Years	Team	Apps	(Gls)
- Merthyr Town
1933–1934	Huddersfield Town	1	(0)
1934–1936	Rochdale	88	(0)
1936–1939	Stockport County	46	(0)
1939	Tranmere Rovers	0	(0)
- * Club domestic league appearances and goals

Gwyn Thomas Jones (February 1912 – 1968) was a professional footballer who played for Merthyr Town, Huddersfield Town, Rochdale, Stockport County and Tranmere Rovers. He was born in Troed-y-rhiw, Wales.
