= Willis Vaughton =

English footballer

Personal information
- Full name: Willis Vaughton
- Date of birth: 20 January 1911
- Place of birth: Sheffield, England
- Date of death: 17 December 2007 (aged 96)
- Place of death: Sheffield, England
- Position: Defender

Senior career*
Years	Team	Apps	(Gls)
1933–1934	Huddersfield Town	2	(1)
1934–1935	Sheffield United	3	(0)
1935–1936	Boston United		
1936–1939	New Brighton	110	(0)
- * Club domestic league appearances and goals

Willis Vaughton (20 January 1911 – 17 December 2007) was a professional footballer who played for Huddersfield Town, Sheffield United, Boston United and New Brighton. He was born and died in Sheffield.
