= 1928 Welsh Cup final =

1928 Football Association of Wales Challenge Cup final
- Event: 1927–28 Welsh Cup
Cardiff City	Bangor City
2	0
- Date: 2 May 1928
- Venue: Farrar Road Stadium, Bangor
- Referee: G Petrie (Holywell)
- Attendance: 12,000

The 1928 Welsh Cup final, the 47th in the competition, was contested by Bangor and Cardiff City at Farrar Road Stadium, Bangor. Cardiff won 2–0.

== Route to the final ==
=== Cardiff City ===
Round	Opposition	Score	Venue
Fifth Round	Oswestry Town	1–7	Park Hall (a)
Sixth Round	Swansea Town	1–0	Ninian Park (h)
Semi-finals	Rhyl	2–2	Racecourse Ground (n)
Replay	Rhyl	2–0	Gay Meadow (n)

=== Bangor City ===
Round	Opposition	Score	Venue
Third Round	Flint Town	1–1	Holywell Road (a)
Replay	Flint Town	4–1	Farrar Road Stadium (h)
Fourth Round	Buckley	3–0	Farrar Road Stadium (h)
Fifth Round	Connah's Quay	3–0	Farrar Road Stadium (h)
Sixth Round	Aberdare Athletic	1–1	Aberdare Athletic Ground (a)
Replay	Aberdare Athletic	7–3	Farrar Road Stadium (h)
Semi-final	Merthyr Town	2–2	Llanelian Road (n)
Replay	Merthyr Town	2–0	Park Hall (n)

Bangor City started their campaign away to Flint Town. After a 1–1 draw, Bangor replayed them at Farrar Road Stadium, where Bangor won 4–1.

In two more home games in the Fourth and Fifth rounds, Bangor saw off both Buckley and Connah's Quay by 3–0.

For the Sixth round, Bangor travelled south to former Football League and Southern League team Aberdare Athletic. After a 1–1 draw Aberdare lost 7–3 at Farrar Road.

In the Semi-final, Bangor faced Football League Division Three South members Merthyr Town at Colwyn Bay. A 2–2 meant a replay at Oswestry where Bangor progressed to the final after a 2–0 win.

== Match ==
=== Detail ===
2 May 1928
15:30

Cardiff City	2 – 0	Bangor
Hughie Ferguson (?)	Report

Farrar Road Stadium, Bangor
Attendance: 12,000
Referee: G Petrie (Holywell)

Cardiff City	Bangor City

CARDIFF CITY:
GK	1	(Republic of Ireland) Tom Farquharson
DF	2	(Scotland) James Nelson
DF	3	(England) Jack Jennings
DF	4	(Wales) Fred Keenor (c)
DF	5	(Northern Ireland) Tom Sloan
MF	6	(England) Billy Hardy
MF	7	(England) Billy Thirlaway
MF	8	(England) Potter Smith
FW	9	(Scotland) Hughie Ferguson
FW	10	(Wales) Len Davies
DF	11	(Scotland) George McLachlan
Manager:
(England) Fred Stewart

BANGOR CITY:
GK	1	(England) J. Rundell
DF	2	(England) T Sinclair
DF	3	(Republic of Ireland) Critchlow
MF	4	(England) G Rundell
MF	5	(Wales) Whittaker
MF	6	(Wales) Ronald Locke
MF	7	(England) Billy Fogg
MF	8	(Wales) P Jeffes
FW	9	(Wales) G White
FW	10	(Wales) Smith
FW	11	(England) Cooper

MATCH RULES

- 90 minutes.
- Replay if scores still level.

== Notes ==
1. ^{nb1}
