= Tosh Powell =

Wales boxer

Personal information
- Nickname: Tosh
- Nationality: (Wales) Welsh
- Born: Thomas Morgan Powell; 1908 Merthyr Tydfil, Glamorgan
- Died: 3 June 1928 (aged 20) Liverpool Royal Infirmary, England
- Weight: bantamweight

Boxing career

Boxing record
- Total fights: 8
- Wins: 5
- Win by KO: 4
- Losses: 3
- Draws: 0
- No contests: 0

Thomas Morgan "Tosh" Powell (1908 – 3 June 1928) was a professional boxer from Wales. Based in Aberdare, Powell was notable for becoming the Welsh bantamweight champion and the matter of his death, caused by injuries sustained in the boxing ring.

== Boxing career ==
Although there is no record of when "Tosh" Powell first started fighting, he was an amateur fighter over a year before he turned professional, with a recorded fight at the Drill Hall in Merthyr in April 1926. Powell's first recorded professional fight was against Trealaw's Nobby Baker, at Merthyr Tydfil on 30 April 1927. Baker was the more experienced professional with seven undefeated contests to his name. The fight went the full fifteen rounds, with Baker winning by points decision. Despite his lack of professional fights, Powell's next opponent was against Johnny Edmunds, the holder of the Welsh bantamweight title. The fight took place at Snow's Pavilion in Merthyr on 9 July 1927 and was scheduled for twenty rounds. Edmunds, with 48 fights was vastly more experienced, but Powell stopped him via technical knockout in the tenth round, taking the Welsh title.

Two months after the contest with Edmunds, Powell was given a re-match against Nobby Baker, which was also recognised as a title defence for Powell's bantamweight belt. Baker had been the busier of the two boxers in the four months between their meetings, contesting six matches to Powell's single fight against Edmunds; though Baker's last two bouts had seen him face defeat for the first time in his career. The fifteen-round match, held in Pontypridd, ended after just seven rounds when Powell stopped Baker in the seventh round on a technical knockout. This contest is regarded as a successful title defence.

Nearly five months later Powell faced Tom Samuels, a novice professional from Treharris. The match lasted only seven rounds when Samuels was disqualified. Although this is recorded as Samuels's only professional fight, this was regarded as a challenge for the Welsh bantamweight championship, and thus a second successful title defence for Powell. On 1 March 1928, Powell fought his first contest outside Wales when he travelled to Liverpool to fight local boxer Lew Sullivan. Sullivan, who had 25 professional matches behind him, had only been stopped once in his career, in the fifteenth round of an encounter with Kid Rich. Powell made it a short contest by knocking Sullivan out in the first round. This would be Powell's only clean knockout in his professional career.

Powell was invited back to Liverpool two months later, with a fight arranged against Dutch featherweight Rein Kokke. The fifteen-round match only lasted three rounds when Kokke was stopped through a technical knockout. Powell had now fought in six professional fights with five wins and just one defeat. Six days after his fight with Kokke, Powell was back in the ring, a hometown match in Aberdare, in his third encounter with Nobby Baker. This time the fight was not considered a title defence, which was fortunate for Powell who was stopped for the second time in his career, and the second time to Baker who again beat him on a points decision after the contest went the distance.

== Death ==
Powell's final fight would take him to Liverpool for the third time in his professional career, when he was arranged to fight with London bantamweight Billy Housego. Housego was slightly more experienced with twelve pro fights, but his record was poorer with only five wins, and of those, four were won by points. Boxrec states that the fight took part on 31 May 1928, though other sources agree on the following day, Friday 1 June. The fight at The Stadium, was scheduled for fifteen three-minute rounds, and in a close contest the fight reached the last round. With only a minute of the fight remaining Housego knocked Powell to the canvas. Powell recovered to his feet on the count of seven, but after returning in a daze to his corner he collapsed. The referee, Mr Gamble, stopped the contest with the match awarded to Housego on a technical knockout. Powell was carried to the dressing rooms, where the doctor on attendance recommended that he be taken to the Liverpool Royal Infirmary. His death, which occurred on Saturday 2 June at 5:50pm, was attributed to a hemorrhage of the brain; he was 20 years old.

At the inquest, Powell's father Richard, testified that his son had not been training before the encounter with Housego, and that he had tried to cancel the fight. Richard Powell stated that the Liverpool promoter, Albert Taylor, had threatened that he would have his son's license suspended if he pulled out of the fight. Taylor denied these claims. The doctor who performed the autopsy testified that the rupture 'might happen to anybody'; the charges were dropped but the promoter was censured.
