= Jimmy Allen (footballer, born 1913) =

English footballer

Personal information
- Full name: James Allen
- Date of birth: 18 August 1913
- Place of birth: Amble, Northumberland, England
- Date of death: 1979 (aged 65–66)
- Height: 5 ft 7 in (1.70 m)
- Position: Defender

Senior career*
Years	Team	Apps	(Gls)
- Stakeford Albion
1934–1935	Huddersfield Town	1	(0)
1935–1937	Queens Park Rangers	44	(1)
1937–1938	Clapton Orient	5	(0)
- * Club domestic league appearances and goals

James Allen (18 August 1913 – 1979) was a professional footballer, who played for Stakeford Albion, Huddersfield Town and Queens Park Rangers and Clapton Orient.

== Biography ==
James Allen was born in Amble, Northumberland, on 18 August 1913. He was a right half-back who played for Northumberland club Stakeford Albion before joining Huddersfield Town in March 1934, where he made a solitary appearance against Preston North End in January 1935. He transferred to Queens Park Rangers in April 1935, for whom he made 45 senior appearances, and then joined Clapton Orient on a free transfer in May 1937, making five senior appearances in the 1937–38 season. Allen died in Hammersmith, London, in 1979.
