= George Thorpe (footballer) =

English footballer

Personal information
- Full name: George Thorpe
- Date of birth: 24 July 1908
- Place of birth: Farnworth, near Bolton, England
- Date of death: 1985 (aged 76–77)
- Place of death: Blackpool, England
- Position: Goalkeeper

Senior career*
Years	Team	Apps	(Gls)
- Leeds United
1931–1932	Huddersfield Town	8	(0)
- Chester City
- * Club domestic league appearances and goals

George Thorpe (24 July 1908 – 1985) was a professional footballer, who played for Leeds United, Huddersfield Town and Chester City. He was born in Farnworth, near Bolton.
