= Joe Calvert =

English footballer (1907–1999)

Personal information
- Date of birth: 3 February 1907
- Place of birth: Beighton, England
- Date of death: 23 December 1999 (aged 92)
- Position: Goalkeeper

Senior career*
Years	Team	Apps	(Gls)
- Owston
1929–1930	Frickley Colliery		
1930–1931	Hull City	0	(0)
1931–1932	Bristol Rovers	42	(0)
1932–1947	Leicester City	80	(0)
1948	Watford	5	(0)
- * Club domestic league appearances and goals

Joe Calvert (3 February 1907 – 23 December 1999) was a British professional footballer who played as a goalkeeper for Bristol Rovers, Leicester City and Watford.

== Career ==
Calvert began his career in senior non-league football, playing for Owston in the Doncaster League before being signed by Frickley Colliery in the 1929–30 season. There is some evidence to suggest he was signed by Hull City in the 1930–31 season but did not make a senior appearance for the club, before transferring to Bristol Rovers in the 1931–32 season. After one season at Bristol Rovers Calvert moved to Leicester City and became dedicated servant of the club, including during the Second World War. In January 1948 Calvert requested a transfer and was sold to Watford where he played only a handful of games.

== Records ==
He is one of the oldest players ever to play for either Leicester or Watford in the Football League; he transferred from Leicester to Watford a few weeks before his 41st birthday.
