= Richard Ellis (librarian) =

British librarian

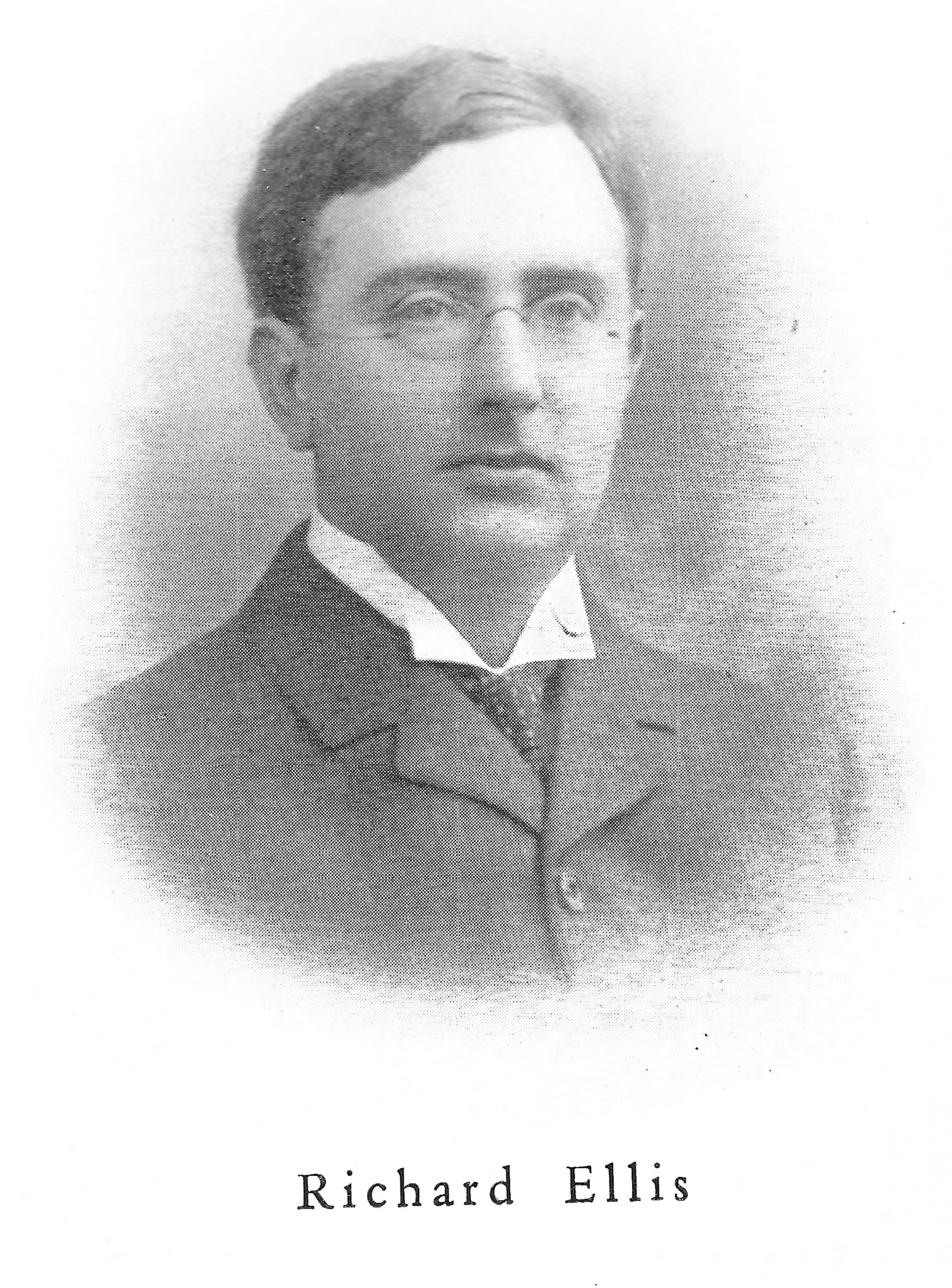
- Born: 27 December 1865; Aberystwyth, Wales
- Died: 6 September 1928 (aged 62); Oxford, England
- Occupation: librarian
- Known for: Edward Lhuyd papers

Richard Ellis (27 December 1865 – 6 September 1928) was a Welsh librarian and bibliographer, whose main work was to collect materials on the life and work of Edward Lhuyd.

== Life ==
Ellis, the son of John Ellis from Aberystwyth, studied at the University College of Wales, Aberystwyth, from 1889 and won a scholarship to Jesus College, Oxford, in 1893. Family reasons meant that he did not take up the place at Oxford until 1898; he was re-awarded a scholarship on the recommendation of the historian Reginald Lane-Poole. He obtained his BA in 1902 and his MA in 1908. His main research at Oxford and thereafter was the collection of material on the life and work of Edward Lhuyd. Some of it was published in 1906/1907 in the Transactions of the Honourable Society of Cymmrodorion under the title Some incidents in the life of Edward Lhuyd. His work was unfinished at his death, and he left his papers to the university library in Aberystwyth.

In 1907, Ellis was appointed to run the Welsh library at the University College of Wales, Aberystwyth, and in 1908 he was appointed the principal assistant to Sir John Ballinger, the first librarian of the National Library of Wales. He was not happy in this post and returned to Oxford in 1912 with a research scholarship. He also worked at the Codrington Library at All Souls College, Oxford, and was the only assistant librarian between 1916 and the end of the First World War. In the early 1920s, Ellis returned to Oxford, making trips to Dublin and Oxford for his research. It was on one of these visits to Oxford that he died in 1928; he was buried in Aberystwyth.

== Works ==
Through his work on Lluyd, Ellis developed a knowledge of other Welshmen at Oxford. This led to Facsimiles of Letters of Oxford Welshmen (the writers including Henry Vaughan, Sir Leoline Jenkins, Ellis Wynne, Edward Samuel and Moses Williams). In 1904, he published An Elizabethan Broadside in the Welsh Language, being a Brief granted in 1591 to Sion Salusburi of Gwyddelwern, Merionethshire. He also wrote some poetry in English.
