= George Crownshaw =

English footballer

Personal information
- Date of birth: 17 April 1908
- Place of birth: Sheffield, England
- Date of death: October 1992 (aged 84)
- Place of death: England
- Position: Midfielder

Senior career*
Years	Team	Apps	(Gls)
1929–1932	Huddersfield Town	26	(8)
- Luton Town
- * Club domestic league appearances and goals

George Crownshaw (17 April 1908 – October 1992) was a professional footballer who played for Huddersfield Town & Luton Town. He was born in Sheffield, South Yorkshire.
