= Reg Robinson =

English footballer

Personal information
- Full name: Reginald Robinson
- Date of birth: 11 February 1910
- Place of birth: Sheffield, England
- Date of death: 17 March 1993 (aged 83)
- Place of death: Scunthorpe, England
- Height: 6 ft 0 in (1.83 m)
- Position: Defender

Senior career*
Years	Team	Apps	(Gls)
- Scunthorpe United
1933–1935	Huddersfield Town	2	(0)
- Exeter City
1936–1939	Watford	2	(0)
- * Club domestic league appearances and goals

Reginald Robinson (11 February 1910 – 17 March 1993) was a professional footballer, born in Sheffield. He played for Scunthorpe United, Huddersfield Town and Exeter City, before finally transferring to Watford in 1936 in exchange for William Brown. He died in Scunthorpe, Lincolnshire, at the age of 83.
