= Sid Judd =

Welsh rugby player (1928–1959)

- Born: Sidney Judd; 14 August 1928 Cardiff, Wales
- Died: 24 February 1959 (aged 30) Llanrumney, Wales
- School: Cardiff High School
- University: Trinity College, Carmarthen
- Occupation: school-master

Rugby union career
- Position: Flanker
Amateur team(s)
| Years | Team | Apps | (Points) |
- Trinity College Carmarthen
| ?-1946 | Carmarthen Athletic RFC | | |
| 1946-1956 | Cardiff RFC | 184 | |
| 1951-52 | Barbarian F.C. | | |
International career
| Years | Team | Apps | (Points) |
- Welsh Secondary Schools
| 1953–1955 | Wales | 10 | (3) |

Sidney "Sid" Judd (14 August 1928 – 24 February 1959) was a Welsh international rugby union flanker who played club rugby for Cardiff and Carmarthen Athletic. He won 10 caps for Wales and is best remembered for scoring one of Wales' two tries in their 1953 victory over New Zealand.

== Rugby career ==
Judd began playing rugby as a schoolboy while at Cardiff High School. As a schoolboy he was selected for Welsh secondary schools and continued playing after he matriculated to Trinity College, Carmarthen, turning out for the college team. While in Carmarthen, Judd turned out as a senior for Carmarthen Athletic RFC. After leaving Trinity, he moved back to Cardiff becoming a school-teacher at Windsor Clive Secondary Modern School.

In 1946 he joined first-class Welsh team, Cardiff RFC. Judd was a consistent part of the Cardiff team, and in the ten seasons he turned out for the club he was selected 184 times scoring 45 tries. During the 1951/52 season, Judd was selected for invitational touring side the Barbarians and played in the Mobbs Memorial Match against East Midlands.

=== International matches played ===
Wales

- England 1953, 1954, 1955
- France 1953, 1954
- Ireland 1953
- New Zealand 1953
- Scotland 1953, 1954, 1955

== Bibliography ==
- Billot, John (1974). Springboks in Wales. Ferndale, Glamorgan: Ron Jones Publications.
- Davies, D.E. (1975). Cardiff Rugby Club, History and Statistics 1876-1975. Risca: The Starling Press. ISBN 0-9504421-0-0.
- Smith, David; Williams, Gareth (1980). Fields of Praise: The Official History of The Welsh Rugby Union. Cardiff: University of Wales Press. ISBN 0-7083-0766-3.
