= Joe Robson =

English footballer

Personal information
- Full name: Joseph Robson
- Date of birth: 21 March 1903
- Place of birth: Gateshead, England
- Date of death: 1969 (aged 65–66)
- Place of death: Bradford, England
- Position: Striker

Senior career*
Years	Team	Apps	(Gls)
1924–1930	Grimsby Town	161	(123)
1930–1932	Huddersfield Town	30	(20)
- Bradford Park Avenue
- * Club domestic league appearances and goals

Joseph Robson (21 March 1903 – 1969) was a professional footballer who played for Grimsby Town, Huddersfield Town and Bradford Park Avenue.
