= Frank Bungay =

English footballer

Personal information
- Full name: Frank Bungay
- Date of birth: 31 March 1909
- Place of birth: Sheffield, England
- Date of death: 1 April 1990 (aged 81)
- Place of death: Chapeltown, Sheffield, England
- Position: Striker

Senior career*
Years	Team	Apps	(Gls)
1931–1933	Huddersfield Town	18	(5)
- Southend United
- * Club domestic league appearances and goals

Frank Bungay (31 March 1909 – 1 April 1990) was an English professional footballer, who played for Huddersfield Town, and Southend United. He was born in Sheffield, the fourth son of George Henry Bungay and his wife, Charlotte Foulds. In 1936, he was signed to Grantham Football Club. He semi-retired and took up work as a chauffeur before marrying Clara Lodge on 7 May 1938. He later worked as a stove fitter.
