= Benny Craig =

English footballer

Personal information
- Full name: Benjamin Craig
- Date of birth: 6 December 1915
- Place of birth: Leadgate, Consett, County Durham, England
- Date of death: 20 January 1982 (aged 66)
- Position: Defender

Senior career*
Years	Team	Apps	(Gls)
1934–1938	Huddersfield Town	98	(0)
1938–1950	Newcastle United	66	(0)
- * Club domestic league appearances and goals

Benjamin Craig (6 December 1915 – 1982) was a professional footballer, who played for Huddersfield Town & Newcastle United. He was born in the village of Leadgate, near Consett, County Durham.

== Honours ==
Huddersfield Town

- FA Cup runner-up: 1937–38
