= Ernie Whittam =

English footballer

Personal information
- Full name: Ernest Alfred Whittam
- Date of birth: 7 January 1911
- Place of birth: Wealdstone, England
- Date of death: 10 March 1951 (aged 40)
- Height: 5 ft 9 in (1.75 m)
- Position: Striker

Senior career*
Years	Team	Apps	(Gls)
1929–1933	Huddersfield Town	19	(4)
1933–1935	Chester	54	(20)
1935–1936	Mansfield Town	20	(4)
1936	Wolverhampton Wanderers	1	(0)
1936–1939	Bournemouth & Boscombe Athletic	116	(28)
- * Club domestic league appearances and goals

Ernest Alfred "Ernie" Whittam (7 January 1911 – 1951) was a professional footballer who played for Huddersfield Town, Chester, Mansfield Town, Wolverhampton Wanderers and Bournemouth & Boscombe Athletic. He was born in Wealdstone.
