= Billy Fogg =

English footballer

Personal information
- Full name: William Henry Fogg
- Date of birth: 9 March 1903
- Place of birth: Birkenhead, Cheshire, England
- Date of death: 16 October 1991 (aged 88)
- Place of death: Birkenhead, Merseyside, England
- Position: Right half

Senior career*
Years	Team	Apps	(Gls)
1924–1926	Tranmere Rovers	22	(6)
1926–1928	Bangor City		
1928–1933	Huddersfield Town	62	(3)
1933–1936	Clapton Orient	81	(2)
1936–?	New Brighton		
- * Club domestic league appearances and goals

William Henry Fogg (9 March 1903 – 29 July 1966) was a professional footballer, who played for Tranmere Rovers, Bangor City, Huddersfield Town, Clapton Orient and New Brighton. He was born in Birkenhead, Cheshire (now in Merseyside).

== Early career ==
Fogg started his career at Tranmere Rovers, scoring on his league debut against Ashington in a Football League Third Division North match in January 1925. He was also a teammate of William "Dixie" Dean. In May 1926 he moved to Bangor City, appearing in the 1928 Welsh Cup Final, which Bangor lost 2–0.

== Huddersfield Town ==
In May 1928 he switched to Huddersfield Town for a fee of £20. He appeared in all of Huddersfield's FA Cup matches in 1929–30, until he was injured in the semi-final. Despite having to miss the final, he still received a runner-up medal.

== Clapton Orient ==
Fogg joined Football League Third Division South club Clapton Orient on 16 August 1933, playing in 86 senior matches. He scored twice for the club, once in a 3–2 league defeat at home to Watford on 21 April 1934, and again in a 2–1 league defeat at Southend United on 28 September 1935.

After three seasons he was transferred to New Brighton on 20 August 1936, where he played in 77 senior matches, scoring once.

He died aged 88 in Birkenhead, Merseyside.
