= Jackie Williams (footballer, born 1911) =

Welsh footballer

Personal information
- Full name: John James Williams
- Date of birth: 29 March 1911
- Place of birth: Aberdare, Wales
- Date of death: 12 October 1987 (aged 76)
- Place of death: Wrexham, Wales
- Position: Midfielder

Senior career*
Years	Team	Apps	(Gls)
- Llanelli
1932–1935	Huddersfield Town	50	(15)
1935–1936	Aston Villa	17	(5)
1936–1938	Ipswich Town	9	(0)
1938–1939	Wrexham	27	(4)

International career
1939	Wales	1	(0)
- * Club domestic league appearances and goals

John James Williams (29 March 1911 – 12 October 1987) was a professional footballer, who played for several clubs, including Huddersfield Town and Aston Villa. He was born in Aberdare, Wales. He made one appearance for Wales against France in 1939.
