= Dennis Jennings (footballer) =

English footballer

Personal information
- Full name: Dennis Bernard Jennings
- Date of birth: 20 July 1910
- Place of birth: Habberley Valley, England
- Date of death: 16 March 1996 (aged 85)
- Place of death: Cornwall, England
- Height: 5 ft 6 in (1.68 m)
- Positions: Outside right; left back

Youth career
- Stourport Swifts
- Romsley Village

Senior career*
Years	Team	Apps	(Gls)
1928–1929	West Bromwich Albion		
1929–1930	Kidderminster Harriers		
1930–1932	Huddersfield Town	33	(5)
1932–1936	Grimsby Town	99	(29)
1936–1951	Birmingham	192	(12)
1951–1953	Kidderminster Harriers		
1953	Lockheed Leamington		
- * Club domestic league appearances and goals

Dennis Bernard Jennings (20 July 1910 – 16 March 1996) was an English professional footballer. He played more than 300 games in the top two divisions of the Football League over a 21-year career which was interrupted by the Second World War, and was the oldest player to appear for Birmingham City in a competitive first-team match.

Born in Habberley Valley, Kidderminster, Worcestershire, Jennings played for several local clubs before joining West Bromwich Albion as an amateur. He then played for Kidderminster Harriers before turning professional with First Division club Huddersfield Town with a transfer fee paid of £600. He played 33 games for them before moving to Grimsby Town, where he helped the club to win the Second Division title in 1933–34. Birmingham paid £1,200 for his services in 1936.

Originally an outside right, in his 15-year Birmingham career he played in every outfield position apart from centre half. During the war he made 174 appearances for the club, contributing to them winning the wartime Football League South in 1945–46; he also guested for Nottingham Forest. After the war he played for five seasons at full back, most often left back, and helped Birmingham win the Second Division championship in 1947–48. He played his last competitive first team game for the club on 6 May 1950 at the age of 39 years 290 days, which made him the oldest player to appear for the first team. He then moved on to former club Kidderminster as player-coach, finishing his career at Lockheed Leamington.

After football, he retired to the Wadebridge area of Cornwall where he and his son Anthony Jennings ran Little Dinham caravan park. He died on 16 March 1996, aged 85.

== Honours ==
Grimsby Town

- Football League Second Division champions: 1933–34
- Birmingham City
- Football League South champions: 1945–46
- Football League Second Division champions: 1947–48
