= Len Beaumont =

English footballer

Personal information
- Full name: Leonard Beaumont
- Date of birth: 4 January 1915
- Place of birth: Huddersfield, England
- Date of death: 22 July 2002 (aged 87)
- Place of death: Nottingham, England
- Position: Midfielder

Senior career*
| Years | Team | Apps | (Gls) |
| 1933–1936 | Huddersfield Town | 3 | (0) |
| 1936–1948 | Portsmouth | | |
| 1948–1949 | Peterborough United | 21 | (3) |
- * Club domestic league appearances and goals

Leonard Beaumont (4 January 1915 – 22 July 2002) was an English professional footballer, who played for Huddersfield Town, Portsmouth and Nottingham Forest. He was born in Huddersfield, West Yorkshire.
