= Ken Willingham =

English footballer

Personal information
- Full name: Charles Kenneth Willingham
- Date of birth: 1 December 1912
- Place of birth: Ecclesfield, Sheffield, England
- Date of death: May 1975 (aged 62)
- Place of death: Dewsbury, England
- Height: 5 ft 7 1/2 in (1.71 m)
- Position: Right half

Youth career
- Ecclesfield

Senior career*
Years	Team	Apps	(Gls)
1928–1930	Worksop Town	0	(0)
1930–1945	Huddersfield Town	247	(4)
1945–1947	Sunderland	14	(0)
1947–1948	Leeds United	35	(0)

International career
1937–1939	England	12	(1)
- * Club domestic league appearances and goals

Charles Kenneth Willingham (1 December 1912 – May 1975) was an English professional footballer, born in Sheffield. As a school boy he captained the Yorkshire Schools' team and won the half-mile county running championship.

== Football career ==
After playing for Ecclesfield, he joined Worksop Town in 1928 at the age of 16. He became a member of Huddersfield's ground staff at Leeds Road in 1930, before signing professionally for Huddersfield Town in 1930, where he spent most of his playing career. Whilst there he played in the 1938 FA Cup final (which was the first FA Cup Final to be transmitted live on British television) in which Huddersfield Town lost 1–0 to Preston North End.

He holds the record for the fastest ever goal scored by a Huddersfield Town player, against Sunderland on 14 December 1935, putting the ball in the back of the net after just ten seconds, with his fourth touch of the ball. He is also in the top 100 Huddersfield Town players as voted for by the fans as their favourite players.

He was capped twelve times for England, scoring on his debut against Finland in an 8–0 win. He also made six appearances for England during the war, as well as representing the Football League on another six occasions.

After World War II, in which he worked in the steel industry in Sheffield, he signed for Sunderland where he made fourteen appearances. He later signed for Leeds United as a player-coach in 1947 before retiring a year later to become the landlord of the Hopewell Inn in Hunslet. He briefly returned to the game in 1952, where he became coach at Halifax Town.

== International career details ==
Match Date	Opponent	Stadium	Score	Result	Goals
20 May 1937	Finland	Töölön Pallokenttä	0–8	(W)	1
9 April 1938	Scotland	Wembley	0–1	(L)	0
14 May 1938	Germany	Olympia	3–6	(W)	0
21 May 1938	Switzerland	Hardturm	2–1	(L)	0
26 May 1938	France	Yves du Manoir	2–4	(W)	0
22 October 1938	Wales	Ninian Park	4–2	(L)	0
26 October 1938	Rest of Europe	Highbury	3–0	(W)	0
9 November 1938	Norway	St James' Park	4–0	(W)	0
16 November 1938	Ireland	Old Trafford	7–0	(W)	0
15 April 1939	Scotland	Hampden Park	1–2	(W)	0
13 May 1939	Italy	San Siro	2–2	(D)	0
18 May 1939	Yugoslavia	BSK	2–1	(L)	0

== Honours ==
Huddersfield Town

- FA Cup runner-up: 1937–38
