= George McLean (footballer, born 1898) =

Scottish footballer (1897–1970)

Personal information
- Full name: George Thomson McLean
- Date of birth: 1898
- Place of birth: Forfar, Scotland
- Date of death: November 1970 (aged 71–72)
- Height: 5 ft 8 in (1.73 m)
- Position: Inside forward

Senior career*
| Years | Team | Apps | (Gls) |
| 1920–1921 | Forfar Athletic | | |
| 1921–1930 | Bradford (Park Avenue) | 256 | (136) |
| 1930–1934 | Huddersfield Town | 120 | (44) |
| 1935–1939 | Forfar Athletic | 102 | (29) |
- * Club domestic league appearances and goals

George Thomson McLean (1898 – 1970) was a Scottish professional footballer who played for Forfar Athletic, Bradford (Park Avenue) and Huddersfield Town.

== Career ==
McLean began playing football in his native Scotland for Scottish Football Alliance side Forfar Athletic in 1920 before coming to England in 1921 to play for Bradford Park Avenue in Football League Division Two. He left Forfar just before the Loons joined the Scottish Football League. He was good enough to sign a contract just before his leaving to ensure the Angus side received £700 from his new club for his services.

Bradford were relegated in his first season but McLean stayed at Horton Park Avenue, becoming one of their legendary players, scoring over a century of league goals and guiding the club to the Division Three North title in 1928. McLean also played in the famous FA Cup upsets of Everton in 1923 and Derby County in 1930, scoring the last minute winner in the former. After a decade in Bradford, McLean was signed by First Division Huddersfield Town in 1930. He went home to Forfar and made his second debut in 1935, playing until the outbreak of World War II in 1939.

== Personal life ==
He was the younger brother of footballer David McLean who was a noted goalscorer of the age. They were teammates at Bradford for one season (1921–22, David's last of three campaigns at the club and George's first of nine) and both closed out their careers at Forfar, but David (eight years older) had retired by the time George came 'home'.

He died in 1970.
