= Norman Christie (footballer, born 1909) =

English footballer

Personal information
- Date of birth: 24 November 1909
- Place of birth: Hebburn, County Durham, England
- Date of death: 4 August 1989 (aged 89)
- Place of death: North Yorkshire, England
- Height: 5 ft 10 in (1.78 m)
- Position: Centre half

Senior career*
Years	Team	Apps	(Gls)
- Bishop Auckland
1931–1934	Huddersfield Town	47	(0)
1934–1937	Blackburn Rovers	43	(0)
- * Club domestic league appearances and goals

Norman Christie (24 November 1909 – 4 August 1989) was an English footballer and manager who played for Bishop Auckland, Huddersfield Town and Blackburn Rovers.

He was a centre-half (central defender). He used to tell how he once jumped up with the opposing centre-forward to head the ball; he jumped with his mouth open, and came down with a mouthful of the forward's skin from the back of his neck.

Christie was born in Hebburn, Durham, the son of William Davidson Christie and Janet Borland. He married Greta Margaret Pratt in 1936.
