= Dave Mangnall =

English footballer, football manager (1905–1962)

Personal information
- Full name: David Mangnall
- Date of birth: 21 September 1905
- Place of birth: Wigan, England
- Date of death: 10 April 1962 (aged 56)
- Place of death: Penzance, England
- Height: 5 ft 10 in (1.78 m)
- Positions: Centre forward; inside forward

Senior career*
Years	Team	Apps	(Gls)
- Maltby New Church
- Maltby Colliery
1923–192?	Doncaster Rovers	0	(0)
1927–1929	Leeds United	9	(6)
1929–1934	Huddersfield Town	79	(61)
1934–1935	Birmingham	37	(14)
1935–1936	West Ham United	35	(28)
1939–1939	Millwall	58	(32)
1939–1944	Queens Park Rangers	3	(3)
Total		221	(144)

Managerial career
- 1944–1952: Queens Park Rangers
- * Club domestic league appearances and goals

David Mangnall (21 September 1905 – 10 April 1962) was an English football player and manager. As a player, he scored 144 goals from 221 appearances in the Football League playing for Leeds United, Huddersfield Town, Birmingham, West Ham United, Millwall and Queens Park Rangers. He was manager of Queens Park Rangers for eight years.

== Football career ==
=== Playing career ===
Born in Wigan, Lancashire, Mangnall was a busy and athletic centre-forward who played for Leeds United between 1927 and 1930. After playing with First Division Huddersfield Town until 1934, he joined Birmingham. He was then signed by West Ham United in 1935 as a replacement for Vic Watson. He scored 25 goals in 35 League appearances for the Hammers and was their top scorer for the 1935–36 season, but moved to Millwall the following year.

Mangnall helped Millwall, who were competing in the Third Division South at the time, into the FA Cup semi-finals in 1937. Millwall's giant-killing feats earned Mangnall the title of, David the Giant Killer as a procession of clubs came to The Old Den and were devoured by The Lions. Following a 6–1 victory away to Aldershot in which Magnall scored 4 goals, Millwall were drawn at home in every round. After a 7–0 defeat of Gateshead, it was the turn of Second Division Fulham. Millwall sent them packing 2–0. First Division Chelsea were the next team to try their luck at The Den. Chelsea were more embarrassed than Fulham when Mangnall's Millwall sent them home 3–0. Derby County, the First Division runners-up the previous season, were the next team to visit. Millwall's record crowd of 48,672 packed into The Den to watch Mangnall score first, with his striking partner McCartney netting the winner four minutes from time. However, when Millwall drew Manchester City, nobody thought they even had a chance of beating them. Millwall got the better of City's star studded team, with Mangnall scoring a goal in each half, making Millwall the first Third Division team in the history of the competition to reach the semi-final. Millwall's dream was ended when they were paired with Sunderland in the semi-final, played at neutral Leeds Road and although Magnall scored yet again, The Lions went down 2–1. There was some consolation for Mangnall's Millwall as they won promotion to the Second Division the following season.

=== Management career ===
On 16 May 1939, just before the outbreak of World War II, he joined Queens Park Rangers as a player and on 29 April 1944 was offered the player-manager role. Although initially reluctant to take it on, he did so, and he built a team that in the 1947–48 season, with George Smith as captain, won the Third Division South championship by four points to give QPR their first-ever promotion. After four tough seasons in the Second Division they were relegated back to the Third Division, where they were to remain for fifteen seasons before Alec Stock led them to promotion again.

After relegation in 1951–52, Mangnall left the club and never managed in the Football League again. He is one of only six QPR managers to achieve a promotion to a higher division, the others being Alec Stock (who managed the feat twice, in successive seasons), Gordon Jago, Terry Venables, Ian Holloway and Neil Warnock.

Mangnall died in Penzance, Cornwall, in 1962 at the age of 56.
