= Charlie Luke (English footballer) =

English footballer

Personal information
- Date of birth: 16 March 1909
- Place of birth: Esh Winning, County Durham, England
- Date of death: 16 October 1983 (aged 74)
- Place of death: Whitstable, Kent, England
- Positions: Outside forward; inside forward

Senior career*
Years	Team	Apps	(Gls)
–	Ushaw Moor		
–	Tow Law Town		
–	Portsmouth	0	(0)
1928–1929	Darlington	2	(0)
–	Esh Winning		
1930–1931	Bishop Auckland		
1931–1936	Huddersfield Town	130	(40)
1936–1938	Sheffield Wednesday	42	(8)
1938	Blackburn Rovers	10	(2)
1938–1939	Chesterfield	13	(4)
–	Whitstable Town		
- * Club domestic league appearances and goals

Charles E. Luke (16 March 1909 – 16 October 1983) was a professional footballer who played in the Football League for Darlington, Huddersfield Town, Sheffield Wednesday, Blackburn Rovers and Chesterfield. He was also on the books of Portsmouth, without representing them in the League, and played non-league football for Ushaw Moor, Tow Law Town, Esh Winning, Bishop Auckland, and Whitstable Town.
