= Alf Young =

English footballer and manager

Personal information
- Date of birth: 4 November 1905
- Place of birth: Sunderland, England
- Date of death: 27 August 1977 (aged 71)
- Place of death: Huddersfield, England
- Height: 1.82 m (6 ft 0 in)
- Position: Defender

Senior career*
Years	Team	Apps	(Gls)
1929–1939	Huddersfield Town	283	(6)
- Durham City
- York City

International career
1932–1938	England	9	(0)

Managerial career
- 1946–1947: Køge BK
- 1948: SK Brann
- 1956: Denmark
- 1957: Køge BK
- 1957–19XX: Esbjerg fB
- * Club domestic league appearances and goals

Alfred Young (4 November 1905 – 30 August 1977) was an English professional footballer who played as a defender for Huddersfield Town between 1927 and 1945. He also played for Durham City and York City.

He played for England nine times between 1932 and 1938, including the infamous 6–3 win against Germany in Berlin in 1938.

He was also one of Denmark's caretaker managers during the 1950s. He also coached Esbjerg fB.

== Honours ==
Huddersfield Town

- FA Cup runner-up: 1937–38
