= Austen Campbell =

English footballer (1901–1981)

Personal information
- Full name: Austen Fenwick Campbell
- Date of birth: 5 May 1901
- Place of birth: Hamsterley, England
- Date of death: 8 September 1981 (aged 80)
- Height: 5 ft 10 in (1.78 m)
- Position: Left half

Senior career*
Years	Team	Apps	(Gls)
1923–1929	Blackburn Rovers	161	(7)
1929–1935	Huddersfield Town	194	(5)

International career
1928–1931	England	8	(0)
- * Club domestic league appearances and goals

Austen "Aussie" Fenwick Campbell (5 May 1901 – 8 September 1981) was an England international footballer who played eight games for his country between 1928 and 1931. He won an F.A. Cup Final Winners Medal with Blackburn Rovers in 1928. The game was against Huddersfield Town who Campbell went on to play for after he left Rovers.

== Honours ==
Blackburn Rovers

- FA Cup: 1927–28

Huddersfield Town

- FA Cup runner-up: 1929–30
