= Wilf Bott =

English footballer

Personal information
- Full name: Wilfred Bott
- Date of birth: 25 April 1907
- Place of birth: Featherstone, England
- Date of death: July 1992 (aged 85)
- Place of death: Hastings, Sussex, England
- Height: 5 ft 7 in (1.70 m)
- Position: Left wing

Senior career*
Years	Team	Apps	(Gls)
–1927	Edlington Colliery Welfare		
1927–1931	Doncaster Rovers	111	(32)
1931–1934	Huddersfield Town	110	(25)
1934–1936	Newcastle United	37	(11)
1936–1939?	Queens Park Rangers	75	(34)
1946	Colchester United	2	(0)
- Lancaster Town
- * Club domestic league appearances and goals

Wilfred Bott (25 April 1907 – July 1992) was an English professional footballer who played as a left winger in the Football League.

== Career ==
Born in Featherstone, Yorkshire, to parents Frederick and Harriet, Bott played for Edlington Colliery Welfare before moving to Football League side Doncaster Rovers in 1927. In his time at Doncaster he scored 33 goals in 120 league and cup games, his last season being the most successful with 17 goals in 28 games including two hat−tricks within three games. His performances brought the attentions of other teams and led to his transfer for a reported "substantial fee" to First Division Huddersfield Town towards the end of the 1930−31 season.

Following a very successful period at Huddersfield, Bott went on to have spells at Newcastle United, Queens Park Rangers, Colchester United and Lancaster Town.

== Honours ==
=== Club ===
Huddersfield Town

- Football League First Division runner-up: 1933–34
