= Reg Mountford =

English footballer and manager

Personal information
- Full name: Reginald Charles Mountford
- Date of birth: 16 July 1908
- Place of birth: Darlington, England
- Date of death: 1994 (aged 85–86)
- Position: Full-back

Senior career*
Years	Team	Apps	(Gls)
1928–1929	Darlington	12	(3)
1929–1939	Huddersfield Town	236	(7)

Managerial career
- Boldklubben Frem
- 1948: Denmark
- * Club domestic league appearances and goals

Reginald Charles Mountford (16 July 1908 – 1994) was an English professional footballer who played as a full-back in the Football League for Darlington and Huddersfield Town. He went on to manage Copenhagen club Boldklubben Frem and the Denmark national team.

Mountford started his career at Darlington, making 12 appearances and scoring three goals before moving to Huddersfield Town in 1929. He made 236 appearances and scored seven goals up until the outbreak of World War II (his three appearances in the 1939–40 season were struck from the record).

He played one wartime international for England in a 3–2 defeat against Scotland at St James' Park on 8 February 1941 in front of a crowd of 25,000. After the war, he emigrated to Denmark and managed Boldklubben Frem in Copenhagen. He managed the Denmark national team for the 1948 Olympics, winning a bronze medal.

After returning to England, he lived near Brighton. He died in 1994.

== Honours ==
Huddersfield Town

- FA Cup runner-up: 1937–38
