= George Roughton =

English footballer and manager

Personal information
- Full name: William George Roughton
- Date of birth: 11 December 1909
- Place of birth: Manchester, England
- Date of death: 7 June 1989 (aged 79)
- Place of death: Southampton, England
- Position: Defender

Youth career
- Droylsden

Senior career*
Years	Team	Apps	(Gls)
1928–1936	Huddersfield Town	164	(0)
1936–1945	Manchester United	86	(0)

Managerial career
- 1945–1952: Exeter City
- 1952–1955: Southampton
- * Club domestic league appearances and goals

William George Roughton (11 December 1909 – 7 June 1989) was a professional footballer who played for Huddersfield Town and Manchester United in the 1930s and was subsequently manager of Exeter City and Southampton.

== Club career ==
Roughton was born in Manchester and played for his local team Droylsden in the Manchester League. He started his professional career at Huddersfield Town, then in Division 1, in 1927 and was a regular member of the team, playing at full-back. He helped Huddersfield to the runners-up position in the 1933–34 season.

Roughton was a member of the FA Touring party that visited Canada in the summer of 1931 and featured in international trials in 1931 and 1934. He went on to win league honours turning out for the Football league versus the Irish League in September 1934 helping the Football league to a 6–1 victory in Belfast.

In September 1936, he moved back to his native Manchester, joining Manchester United, who were relegated to Division 2 at the end of his first season with them, although they were promoted straight back up as runners-up in 1937–38.

== Managerial career ==
After World War II, he joined Exeter City as manager. He kept the Grecians on an even keel but did not achieve any real success, generally finishing mid-table in the Third Division (South).

In March 1952, he moved to Southampton, taking over from Sid Cann who had resigned the previous December. As part of the deal with Exeter, Norman Kirkman moved in the opposite direction to become player-manager.

Roughton's time at The Dell was not a great success and the Saints were relegated to Division 3 (South) at the end of his first full season in charge. He was unable to regain Southampton's place in Division 2, and in September 1955, he was asked to resign, to be replaced by the man who would change Southampton's history, Ted Bates.

After leaving Southampton, he worked part-time for the Hampshire F.A.
