= Shaun Wane =

English rugby league footballer and coach

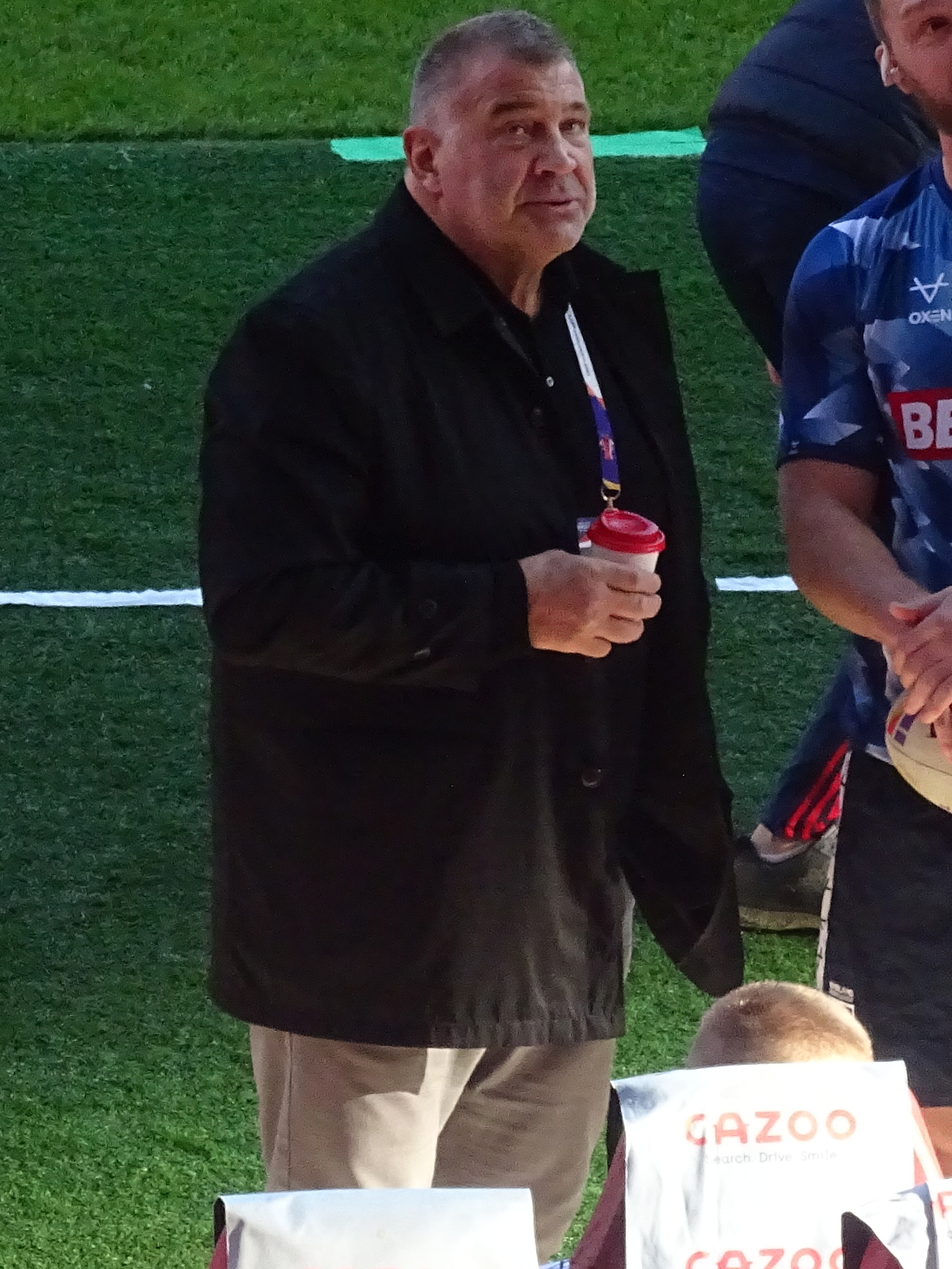

Personal information
- Full name: Shaun David Wane
- Born: 14 September 1964 (age 61) Wigan, Lancashire, England
- Height: 6 ft 0 in (1.83 m)

Playing information
- Position: Prop, Second-row, Loose forward
Club
| Years | Team | Pld | T | G | FG | P |
|---|---|---|---|---|---|---|
| 1982–90 | Wigan | 149 | 11 | 0 | 0 | 44 |
| 1990–93 | Leeds | 43 | 2 | 0 | 0 | 8 |
| 1993–94 | Workington Town | 8 | 2 | 0 | 0 | 8 |
| | Total | 200 | 15 | 0 | 0 | 60 |
Representative
| Years | Team | Pld | T | G | FG | P |
| 1984–86 | Great Britain U21 | 3 | 1 | 0 | 0 | 4 |
| 1985–91 | Lancashire | 3 | 0 | 0 | 0 | 0 |
| 1985–86 | Great Britain | 2 | 0 | 0 | 0 | 0 |

Coaching information
Club
| Years | Team | Gms | W | D | L | W% |
| 2011–18 | Wigan Warriors | 238 | 161 | 6 | 71 | 68 |
Representative
| Years | Team | Gms | W | D | L | W% |
| 2020–26 | England | 18 | 14 | 0 | 4 | 78 |
- Source: As of 14 January 2026

Shaun David Wane (born 14 September 1964) is an English professional rugby league coach who was most recently the head coach of the England at international level. He is also Leadership and Management Director of Wigan Warriors, for whom he served as head coach from 2011 to 2018; under his leadership, the team won three Super League Grand Finals and one Challenge Cup. He is also former professional rugby league footballer.

As a player, he represented at international level as a prop for Great Britain, and at club level for Wigan, Leeds and Workington Town as a prop, second-row or loose forward from 1982 to 1994.

== Background ==
Shaun Wane was born in Wigan, Lancashire, England on 14 September 1964.

== Playing career ==
=== 1980s ===
Wane joined Wigan from Wigan St Patricks in 1982 and played 149 matches for the club. He won caps for Great Britain in 1984 and 1985 against France. Wane played in the 14–8 victory over New Zealand at Central Park on 6 October 1985.

Wane played right-second-row in Wigan's 18–26 defeat by St. Helens in the 1984 Lancashire Cup Final during the 1984–85 season at Central Park, Wigan, on Sunday 28 October 1984, played right-prop in the 34–8 victory over Warrington in the 1985 Lancashire Cup Final during the 1985–86 season at Knowsley Road, St. Helens, on Sunday 13 October 1985. He right-prop, and scored a try in the 18–4 victory over Hull Kingston Rovers in the 1985–86 John Player Special Trophy Final during the 1985–86 season at Elland Road, Leeds on Saturday 11 January 1986.

Wane played in the 8–0 victory over Warrington in the Premiership Final during the 1986–87 season at Old Trafford on 17 May 1987.

Wane helped Wigan to the Championship victory during the 1986–87 season. He won the man of the match in the 8–2 victory over Manly-Warringah Sea Eagles in the 1987 World Club Challenge at Central Park on 7 October 1987.

Wane was a substitute in the 32–12 victory over Halifax in the 1988 Challenge Cup Final during the 1987–88 season at Wembley on Saturday 30 April 1988.

Wane played right-prop in the 28–16 victory over Warrington in the 1987 Lancashire Cup Final during the 1987–88 season at Knowsley Road, St. Helens, on Sunday 11 October 1987.

Wane played right-prop in the 18–4 victory over Warrington in the 1988–89 John Player Special Trophy Final during the 1988–89 season at Burnden Park, Bolton on Saturday 7 January 1989,

=== 1990s ===
Wane appeared as a substitute (replacing Prop Ian Lucas on 21 minutes) in the 24–12 victory over Halifax in the 1989–90 John Player Special Trophy Final during the 1989–90 season at Elland Road, Leeds on Saturday 13 January 1990. He featured in Wigan's Championship victory during the 1989–90 season.

In 1990 Wane left Wigan to join Leeds where he spent three seasons. He then joined Workington Town for a season before retiring in 1994.

== Coaching career ==
=== Wigan Warriors ===
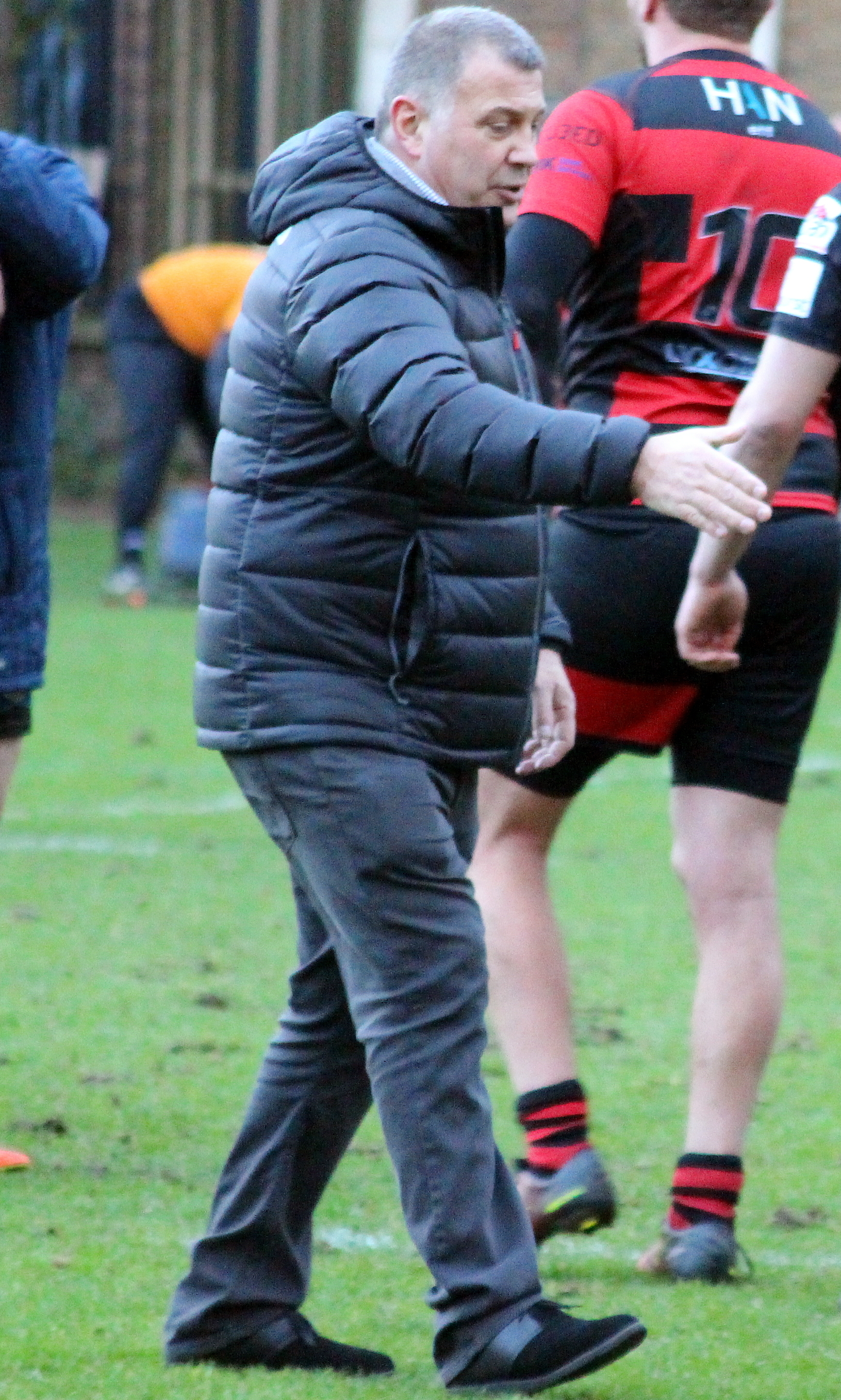
Wane with Wigan in 2018

In 2003, after working as a scout for the club for three years, Wane was appointed as coach for Wigan's under-18 academy side.

On 7 October 2009 Wane was appointed the assistant coach of Wigan working under new coach Michael Maguire, and with player/assistant coach Paul Deacon. He was part of a successful season at Wigan which saw them top the Super League XV table and go on to win the Super League Grand Final with a 22–10 victory over rivals St. Helens. During the season Wane took temporary charge of the first team for Wigan's away victories in July over Hull FC, and Leeds whilst Maguire was on compassionate leave.

In October 2011, Wane was appointed Wigan's head coach, replacing Maguire, who had returned to Australia to coach in the National Rugby League.

On 5 October 2013, Wane coached Wigan to victory in the 2013 Super League Grand Final against Warrington at Old Trafford, thus achieving the double that year after winning the 2013 Challenge Cup Final with victory over Hull F.C. at Wembley Stadium in August.

Wane coached Wigan to the 2015 Super League Grand Final defeat by Leeds at Old Trafford.

Wane also coached Wigan to victory in the 2016 Super League Grand Final at Old Trafford.

Wane coached the Wigan club to the 2017 Challenge Cup Final defeat by Hull F.C. at Wembley Stadium.

Wane departed Wigan after beating Warrington at Old Trafford in the 2018 Super League Grand Final.

=== Scotland RU ===
Following his final season with Wigan, Wane was appointed as a High Performance Coach for the Scotland national rugby union team in June 2018. He stepped down from the role in February 2020.

=== England RL ===
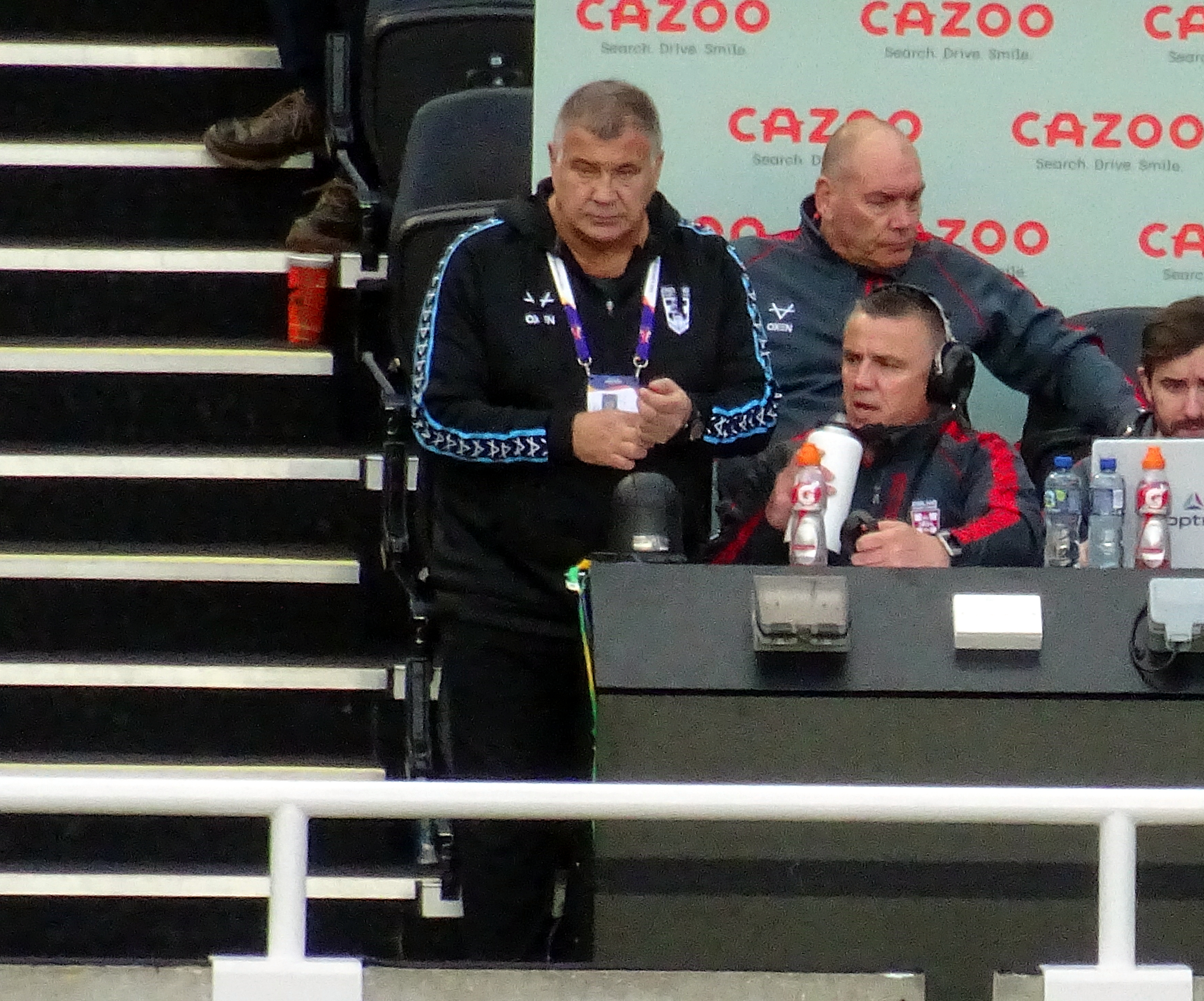
Wane alongside assistant Andy Last for England at the 2021 RLWC in 2022

On 3 February 2020, Wane was appointed as England head coach on a two-year deal.

25 June 2021 was his first competitive game coaching England in their 24–26 defeat to the Combined Nations All Stars, at the Halliwell Jones Stadium, Warrington, as part of England's 2021 Rugby League World Cup preparation.

Wane's first Rugby League World Cup in charge of England results in a semi-final finish. England's 2021 World Cup campaign (held in 2022) saw three wins in the group stage, followed by a quarter final victory over Papua New Guinea before losing 27–26 to Samoa in the semi-finals.

In October and November 2023, Wane lead England to a 3-0 test series victory in the 2023 Tonga rugby league tour of England.

In December 2023, England moved up to third the IRL World Rankings.

Autumn 2024 saw Wane lead his side to a 2-0 Test series victory over Samoa. This marked a significant moment for England following their narrow loss to Samoa in the Rugby League World Cup semi-final the previous year. In the 2025 Ashes Series test against Australia, England would lose 3-0 under Wane with England only scoring two tries across the three matches.

Wane stepped down as England head coach in the January following the series.

== Managerial statistics ==
Updated: 26 October 2025

Managerial record by team and tenure
| Team | From | To | Record | | | | |
| Team | From | To | P | W | D | L | Win % |
|---|---|---|---|---|---|---|---|
| Wigan Warriors | 2012 | 2018 | 240 | 162 | 6 | 72 | 67.5 |
| England | 2021 | present | 17 | 14 | 0 | 3 | 82.4 |
| Total | | | 256 | 176 | 6 | 74 | 68.8 |

== Honours ==
=== As player ===
==== Wigan ====
- First Division
  - Winners (2): 1986–87, 1989–90
- Premiership
  - Winners (1): 1986–87
- Challenge Cup
  - Winners (4): 1984–85, 1987–88, 1988–89, 1989–90
- World Club Challenge
  - Winners (1): 1987
- Lancashire Cup
  - Winners (4): 1985–86, 1986–87, 1987–88, 1988–89
- Regal Trophy
  - Winners (5): 1982–83, 1985–86, 1986–87, 1988–89, 1989–90
- Charity Shield
  - Winners (2): 1985–86, 1987–88

=== As coach ===
==== Wigan ====
- Super League
  - Winners (3): 2013, 2016, 2018
- League Leaders' Shield
  - Winners (1): 2012
- Challenge Cup
  - Winners (1): 2013
- World Club Challenge
  - Winners (1): 2017

==== England ====
- Test series
  - Winners (2): 2023, 2024
