= Alan Rathbone =

GB international rugby league footballer

Personal information
- Born: 20 October 1958; Warrington, England
- Died: 4 June 2016 (aged 57); Westbrook, Warrington, England

Playing information
- Position: Second-row, Loose forward
Club
Years	Team	Pld	T	G	FG	P
1976–78	Leigh	21+9	3	0	0	9
1978–79	Rochdale Hornets	18+7	1	0	0	3
1979–81	Leigh	44+3	7	0	0	21
1981–85	Bradford Northern	86+11	17	0	1	59
1985–87	Warrington	27+6	3	0	0	12
1987	Leeds	1	0	0	0	0
	Total	233	31	0	1	104
Representative
Years	Team	Pld	T	G	FG	P
1982–85	Great Britain	6	0	0	0	0
1979	GB Under 24	0+1	0	0	0	0

Alan Rathbone (20 October 1958 – 4 June 2016), also known by the nicknames of "Action", and "Rambo", was an English amateur boxer, and professional rugby league footballer who played in the 1970s and 1980s. He played at representative level for Warrington Schoolboys, Great Britain Schoolboys, British Amateur Rugby League Association (BARLA) Under-19s, Great Britain Under-21s, Great Britain Under-24s, and Great Britain, and at club level for Leigh (two spells), Rochdale Hornets, Bradford Northern, Warrington, and Leeds, as a second-row, or loose forward.

== Background ==
Alan Rathbone was born in Warrington, Lancashire, England. He grew up in Bewsey, Warrington, and worked as a painter at K. T. Painters in Warrington, after retiring from rugby league. He suffered from arthritis in his hand, knees, and shoulders due to the injuries he had sustained while playing rugby league. He died aged 57 in Westbrook, Warrington, Cheshire, and his funeral took place at 1pm on Thursday 30 June 2016 at Walton Lea Crematorium, Walton, Warrington.

== Playing career ==
=== International honours ===
Alan Rathbone won caps for Great Britain while at Bradford Northern in 1982 against France, and Australia, in 1983 against France (2 matches), and in 1985 against France (2 matches).

In addition to the above Test matches, Alan Rathbone played loose forward in Great Britain's 7–8 defeat by France in the friendly at Stadio Pier Luigi Penzo, Venice on Saturday 31 July 1982.

=== County Cup Final appearances ===
Alan Rathbone played loose forward in Bradford Northern's 5–10 defeat by Castleford in the 1981 Yorkshire Cup Final during the 1981–82 season at Headingley, Leeds, on Saturday 3 October 1981, and played loose forward, and was sent-off for a late-tackle on Ian Potter in Warrington's 8–34 defeat by Wigan in the 1985 Lancashire Cup Final during the 1985–86 season at Knowsley Road, St. Helens, on Sunday 13 October 1985.

=== John Player Special Trophy Final appearances ===
Alan Rathbone appeared as a substitute (replacing hooker Kevin Tamati) in Warrington's 4–18 defeat by Wigan in 1986–87 John Player Special Trophy Final during the 1986–87 season at Central Park, Wigan on Saturday 10 January 1987.

=== Club career ===
Alan Rathbone made his début for Leigh against Castleford during September 1976. He was transferred from Leigh to Rochdale Hornets during 1978, transferred from Rochdale Hornets back to Leigh during 1979, transferred from Leigh to Bradford Northern on 16 June 1981 for £17,000 (based on increases in average earnings, this would be approximately £86,870 in 2016), and transferred from Bradford Northern to Warrington during June 1985 for £40,000 (based on increases in average earnings, this would be approximately £149,800 in 2016). He made his début for Warrington against Bradford Northern at Wilderspool Stadium, Warrington on Sunday 1 September 1985, and he played his last match, and scored a try for Warrington in the 24-12 victory over Hull Kingston Rovers at Wilderspool Stadium, Warrington on Sunday 26 April 1987. He was transferred from Warrington to Leeds during 1987 for £35,000 (based on increases in average earnings, this would be approximately £112,700 in 2016), and made his début for Leeds against Leigh at Headingley, Leeds, when he incurred a severe jaw injury in the first-half, and never played again.
