= Brian Case =

Great Britain and England international rugby league footballer

Personal information
- Born: 14 January 1958 (age 68) St Helens, England

Playing information
- Position: Prop
Club
Years	Team	Pld	T	G	FG	P
1976–82	Warrington	191	14	0	0	42
1983–88	Wigan	198	14	0	0	54
1989–91	Leigh	43	2	0	0	8
	Total	432	30	0	0	104
Representative
Years	Team	Pld	T	G	FG	P
1979–82	Great Britain U24	4	0	0	0	0
1981–87	Lancashire	3	0	0	0	0
1981	England	1	0	0	0	0
1984–88	Great Britain	7	0	0	0	0

Brian Case (born 14 January 1958) is an English former professional rugby league footballer who played in the 1970s, 1980s and 1990s. He played at representative level for Great Britain and England, and at club level for Warrington, Wigan and Leigh, as a prop.

== Background ==
Brian Case's birth was registered in St. Helens, Lancashire, England.

== Playing career ==
=== Warrington ===
Born in St Helens, Case started his professional career at Warrington, joining the club from local side Blackbrook in 1975. He made his first team debut in 1976, and went on to score 14 tries in 191 appearances for the club.

Case played at second-row in Warrington's 14–16 defeat by Widnes in the 1978–79 John Player Trophy Final during the 1977–78 season at Knowsley Road, St. Helens on Saturday 28 April 1979.

Case played at prop in Warrington's 26–10 victory over Wigan in the 1980 Lancashire Cup Final during the 1980–81 season at Knowsley Road, St. Helens, on Saturday 4 October 1980

He played at prop in the 12–5 victory over Barrow in the 1980–81 John Player Trophy Final during the 1980–81 season at Central Park, Wigan on Saturday 24 January 1981.

Case played his final game for the club in March 1982 after being transfer listed at his own request.

=== Wigan ===
In January 1983, Case joined Wigan for a transfer fee of £50,000. Shortly after arriving at the club, he appeared as a substitute (replacing second-row Graeme West) in Wigan's 15–4 victory over Leeds in the 1982–83 John Player Trophy Final during the 1982–83 season at Elland Road, Leeds on Saturday 22 January 1983.

Case played in Wigan's victory in the Championship during the 1986–87 season.

Case played at prop in Wigan's 8–0 victory over Warrington in the Premiership Final during the 1986–87 season at Old Trafford, Manchester on Sunday 17 May 1987.

Case played at prop in Wigan's 8–2 victory over Manly-Warringah Sea Eagles in the 1987 World Club Challenge at Central Park, Wigan on Wednesday 7 October 1987.

Case played at prop in Wigan's 28–24 victory over Hull F.C. in the 1985 Challenge Cup Final during the 1984–85 season at Wembley Stadium, London on Saturday 4 May 1985, and played at prop in the 32-12 victory over Halifax in the 1988 Challenge Cup Final during the 1987–88 season at Wembley Stadium, London on Saturday 30 April 1988.

He played at prop in Wigan's 18–26 defeat by St. Helens in the 1984 Lancashire Cup Final during the 1984–85 season at Central Park, Wigan on Sunday 28 October 1984, appeared as a substitute (replacing Fullback Shaun Edwards) in the 34–8 victory over Warrington in the 1985 Lancashire Cup Final during the 1985–86 season at Knowsley Road, St. Helens, on Sunday 13 October 1985, played at prop in Wigan's 15–8 victory over Oldham in the 1986 Lancashire Cup Final during the 1986–87 season at Knowsley Road, St. Helens, on Sunday 19 October 1986, and played at prop in the 28-16 victory over Warrington in the 1987 Lancashire Cup Final during the 1987–88 season at Knowsley Road, St. Helens, on Sunday 11 October 1987.

Case played at prop in the 18–4 victory over Warrington in the 1986–87 John Player Special Trophy Final during the 1986–87 season at Burnden Park, Bolton on Saturday 10 January 1987.

Case played at prop in Wigan's 14–8 victory over New Zealand in the 1985 New Zealand rugby league tour of Great Britain and France match at Central Park, Wigan on Sunday 6 October 1985.

=== Leigh ===
In August 1989, Case and his team-mate Ian Potter were signed by Leigh for a combined fee of £62,500. He played 43 times for the club before retiring in 1991.

=== International honours ===
Case won a cap for England while at Warrington in 1981 against France, and won caps for Great Britain while at Wigan in 1984 against Australia, and New Zealand (3 matches), in 1987 against Papua New Guinea; and in 1988 against Papua New Guinea, and Australia (interchange/substitute). He also played three times for Lancashire three times.
