= 1980–81 John Player Trophy =

- Structure: National knockout championship
- Teams: 32
- Winners: Warrington
- Runners-up: Barrow

This was the tenth season for rugby league's League Cup competition. It was again known as the John Player Trophy for sponsorship purposes.

Warrington won the final, beating Barrow by the score of 12-5 at Central Park, Wigan in front of a crowd of 12,802. The gate receipts were £21020.

== Background ==
This season saw only one change in the entrants, with the admittance of Fulham to the league and to this competition, resulted in only one junior club being invited, the total number remaining at thirty-two.

== Competition and results ==
=== Round 1 - First Round ===
Involved 16 matches and 32 Clubs

Game No	Fixture Date	Home team	Score	Away team	Venue	Att	Rec	Notes	Ref
1	Sat 22 Nov 1980	Hull F.C.	12-0	Bradford Northern	Boulevard	10854			
2	Sat 22 Nov 1980	Hunslet	15-5	Workington Town	Mount Pleasant	700			
3	Sun 23 Nov 1980	Batley	4-20	Huddersfield	Mount Pleasant	1781			
4	Sun 23 Nov 1980	Blackpool Borough	21-7	Huyton	Borough Park	450			
5	Sun 23 Nov 1980	Bramley	10-11	Halifax	McLaren Field	2338			
6	Sun 23 Nov 1980	Castleford	30-17	St Helens Recs	Wheldon Road	2823		1	
7	Sun 23 Nov 1980	Dewsbury	12-37	Featherstone Rovers	Crown Flatt	2700			
8	Sun 23 Nov 1980	Doncaster	10-18	Whitehaven	Bentley Road Stadium/Tattersfield	432			
9	Sun 23 Nov 1980	Fulham	9-3	Leeds	Craven Cottage	12583			
10	Sun 23 Nov 1980	Keighley	16-34	Hull Kingston Rovers	Lawkholme Lane	3895		2	
11	Sun 23 Nov 1980	Leigh	38-5	Rochdale Hornets	Hilton Park	3167			
12	Sun 23 Nov 1980	St. Helens	12-14	Warrington	Knowsley Road	7946			
13	Sun 23 Nov 1980	Salford	17-9	Wigan	The Willows	3715			
14	Sun 23 Nov 1980	Swinton	10-12	Barrow	Station Road	2470			
15	Sun 23 Nov 1980	Widnes	20-17	Wakefield Trinity	Naughton Park	5956			
16	Sun 23 Nov 1980	York	11-9	Oldham	Clarence Street	5154			

=== Round 2 - Second Round ===
Involved 8 matches and 16 Clubs

Game No	Fixture Date	Home team	Score	Away team	Venue	Att	Rec	Notes	Ref
1	Sat 6 Dec 1980	Warrington	11-7	Hull Kingston Rovers	Wilderspool	4325			
2	Sun 7 Dec 1980	Barrow	26-13	Hunslet	Craven Park	4185			
3	Sun 7 Dec 1980	Blackpool Borough	5-11	Halifax	Borough Park	1724			
4	Sun 7 Dec 1980	Hull F.C.	11-10	York	Boulevard	11129			
5	Sun 7 Dec 1980	Leigh	17-9	Fulham	Hilton Park	7606			
6	Sun 7 Dec 1980	Salford	8-15	Castleford	The Willows	3452			
7	Sun 7 Dec 1980	Whitehaven	22-3	Featherstone Rovers	Recreation Ground	3922			
8	Tue 9 Dec 1980	Widnes	25-9	Huddersfield	Naughton Park	3571			

=== Round 3 -Quarter Finals ===
Involved 4 matches with 8 clubs

Game No	Fixture Date	Home team	Score	Away team	Venue	Att	Notes	Ref
1	Sat 13 Dec 1980	Castleford	18–10	Widnes	Wheldon Road	3571	3	
2	Sun 14 Dec 1980	Hull F.C.	13–0	Whitehaven	Boulevard	11228		
3	Sun 14 Dec 1980	Leigh	13–15	Barrow	Hilton Park	5521	4	
4	Sun 14 Dec 1980	Warrington	16–10	Halifax	Wilderspool	5532		

=== Round 4 – Semi-Finals ===
Involved 2 matches and 4 Clubs

Game No	Fixture Date	Home team	Score	Away team	Venue	Att	Rec	Notes	Ref
1	Sat 20 Dec 1980	Warrington	5-5	Castleford	Central Park	3877			
2	Sat 10 Jan 1981	Barrow	13-10	Hull F.C.	Headingley	11202			

=== Round 3 – Semi-Finals - Replays ===
Involved 1 match and 2 Clubs

Game No	Fixture Date	Home team	Score	Away team	Venue	Att	Rec	Notes	Ref
1	Sun 28 Dec 1980	Warrington	22-10	Castleford	Headingley	9279			

=== Final ===
24 January 1981

Warrington	12 – 5	Barrow
Tries: Bevan (2); Goals: Hesford (2); Drop goals: Hesford (2)		Tries: Mason; Goals: Ball

Central Park, Wigan
Attendance: 12,820
Referee: Billy Thompson (Huddersfield)
Player of the Match: Tommy Martyn

==== Teams ====
Warrington	№	Barrow
Steve Hesford	1	Dave Elliott
Rick Thackray	2	Ralph McConnell
Ian Duane	3	Nigel French
John Bevan	4	Ian Ball (c)
Mike Kelly	5	Tony Wainwright
Ken Kelly (c)	6	Mel Mason
Alan Gwilliam	7	David Cairns
Neil Courtney	8	David Chisnall
Tony Waller	9	Howard Allen
Brian Case	10	Malcolm Flynn
Tommy Martyn	11	Kevin James
Ian Potter	12	Steve Kirkby
Eddie Hunter	13	Derek Hadley
? not used	14	? not used
Bob Eccles (for Eddie Hunter)	15	Eddie Szymala (for Howard Allen)
Billy Benyon	Coach	Frank Foster

=== Prize money ===
As part of the sponsorship deal and funds, the prize money awarded to the competing teams for this season is as follows:

Finish Position	Cash prize	No. receiving prize	Total cash
Winner	£8,500	1	£8,500
Runner-up	£4,000	1	£4,000
Semi-finalists	£2,000	2	£4,000
Losers in Rd 3	£1,000	4	£4,000
Losers in Rd 2	£800	8	£6,400
Losers in Rd 1	£600	16	£9,600
Grand Total			£36,500

=== The road to success ===
This tree excludes any preliminary round fixtures

First round
St. Helens	12
Warrington	14
Keighley	16
Hull Kingston Rovers	34
Blackpool Borough	21
Huyton	7
Bramley	10
Halifax	11
Salford	17
Wigan	9
Castleford	30
St Helens Recs	17
Widnes	20
Wakefield Trinity	17
Batley	4
Huddersfield	20
Leigh	38
Rochdale Hornets	5
Fulham	9
Leeds	3
Swinton	10
Barrow	12
Hunslet	15
Workington Town	5
Hull F.C.	12
Bradford Northern	0
York	11
Oldham	9
Doncaster	10
Whitehaven	18
Dewsbury	12
Featherstone Rovers	37

Second round
Warrington	11
Hull Kingston Rovers	7
Blackpool Borough	5
Halifax	11
Salford	8
Castleford	15
Widnes	25
Huddersfield	9
Leigh	17
Fulham	9
Barrow	26
Hunslet	13
Hull F.C.	11
York	10
Whitehaven	22
Featherstone Rovers	3

Third round
Warrington	16
Halifax	10
Castleford	18
Widnes	10
Leigh	13
Barrow	15
Hull F.C.	13
Whitehaven	0

Semifinals
Warrington	5 (22)
Castleford	5 (10)
Barrow	13
Hull F.C.	10

Final
Warrington	12
Barrow	5

== Notes and comments ==
1 * Pilkington Recs are a Junior (amateur) club from St Helens, home ground was City Road until they moved to Ruskin Drive from 2011-12
2 * Wigan official archives gives the score as 15-34 but RUGBYLEAGUEproject gives it as 16-34
3 * RUGBYLEAGUEproject gives the attendance as 3,571, the same as the previously listed match (which was Widnes v Huddersfield in round 2), but the Widnes official website omits to give the attendance for this match, one of only a few matches for that season without an attendance noted
4 * Wigan official archives give the score as 13-10 but RUGBYLEAGUEproject gives it as 13-15. As Barrow progressed into the semi-final, the score given in the Wigan archives was obviously in error
5 * RUGBYLEAGUEproject gives the attendance as 12,820 but Rothman's Yearbooks 1990-91 and 1992-93 give it as 12,802
6 * The attendance was a record for the final of this tournament (but would be broken next season)
7 * Central Park was the home ground of Wigan with a final capacity of 18,000, although the record attendance was 47,747 for Wigan v St Helens 27 March 1959

== See also ==
- 1980–81 Rugby Football League season
- 1980 Lancashire Cup
- 1980 Yorkshire Cup
- Player's No.6 Trophy
- Rugby league county cups
