= Ken Kelly (rugby league) =

Great Britain and England international rugby league footballer

Personal information
- Full name: Kenneth Kelly
- Born: 7 September 1952 (age 73) St Helens, Merseyside

Playing information
- Height: 5 ft 7 in (1.70 m)
- Weight: 10 st 10 lb (68 kg)
- Position: Stand-off, Scrum-half
Club
Years	Team	Pld	T	G	FG	P
1969–72	St. Helens	87	49	1	0	149
1972–77	Bradford Northern	65	19	0	0	57
1977–87	Warrington	316	73	0	10	248
1989–90	Runcorn Highfield	5	1	0	0	4
	Total	473	142	1	10	458
Representative
Years	Team	Pld	T	G	FG	P
1979–81	England	3	1	0	0	3
1972–82	Great Britain	4	0	0	0	0
1972–81	Lancashire	6	3	0	0	18

Kenneth Kelly (born 7 September 1952) is an English former professional rugby league footballer who played in the 1960s, 1970s and 1980s. He played at representative level for Great Britain and England, and at club level for St. Helens, Bradford Northern and Warrington, as a stand-off, or scrum-half.

== Playing career ==
=== St Helens ===
Kelly played stand-off in St. Helens' 8–2 victory over Rochdale Hornets in the 1971 BBC2 Floodlit Trophy Final during the 1971–72 season at Headingley, Leeds on Tuesday 14 December 1971.

Kelly played stand-off in St. Helens' 16–13 victory over Leeds in the 1972 Challenge Cup Final during the 1971–72 season at Wembley Stadium, London on Saturday 13 May 1972.

=== Bradford Northern ===
Kelly was a substitute in Bradford Northern's 3–2 victory over Widnes in the 1974–75 Player's No.6 Trophy Final during the 1974–75 season at Wilderspool Stadium, Warrington on Saturday 25 January 1975.

=== Warrington ===
Kelly played stand-off, was captain in Warrington's 26–10 victory over Wigan in the 1980 Lancashire Cup Final during the 1980–81 season at Knowsley Road, St. Helens, on Saturday 4 October 1980, played scrum-half, was captain, and scored a try in the 16–0 victory over St. Helens in the 1982 Lancashire Cup Final during the 1982–83 season at Central Park, Wigan on Saturday 23 October 1982, and played stand-off in the 8–34 defeat by Wigan in the 1985 Lancashire Cup Final during the 1985–86 season at Knowsley Road, St. Helens, on Sunday 13 October 1985.

He played at centre in Warrington's 9–4 victory over Widnes in the 1977–78 Players No.6 Trophy Final during the 1977–78 season at Knowsley Road, St. Helens on Saturday 28 January 1978, played stand-off (replaced by substitute Eddie Hunter) in the 4–16 defeat by Widnes in the 1978–79 John Player Trophy Final during the 1978–79 season at Knowsley Road, St. Helens on Saturday 28 April 1979, played stand-off in the 12–5 victory over Barrow in the 1980–81 John Player Trophy Final during the 1980–81 season at Central Park, Wigan on Saturday 24 January 1981, and played stand-off in the 4–18 defeat by Wigan in the 1986–87 John Player Special Trophy Final during the 1986–87 season at Burnden Park, Bolton on Saturday 10 January 1987.

=== International honours ===
Ken Kelly won caps for England while at Warrington in 1979 against Wales, in 1981 against France, and Wales, and won caps for Great Britain while at St Helens in 1972 against France (2 matches), while at Warrington in 1980 against New Zealand, and in 1982 against Australia.

== Honoured at Warrington Wolves ==
Ken Kelly is a Warrington Wolves Hall of Fame inductee.
