= Paul Cullen (rugby league) =

Professional rugby league coach and former rugby league footballer

Personal information
- Born: 4 March 1963 (age 63) Warrington, England

Playing information
Club
Years	Team	Pld	T	G	FG	P
1980–96	Warrington	350	56	0	0	217
Representative
Years	Team	Pld	T	G	FG	P
1987–91	Lancashire	3	0	0	0	0

Coaching information
Club
Years	Team	Gms	W	D	L	W%
2000–02	Whitehaven RLFC
2002–08	Warrington Wolves	104	44	0	60	42
2009–10	Widnes Vikings	56	32	1	23	57
	Total	160	76	1	83	48
Representative
Years	Team	Gms	W	D	L	W%
2006	England	4	4	0	0	100

Paul Cullen (born 4 March 1963) is an English professional rugby league football coach and former player. He was the Director of Rugby at Widnes Vikings of the Super League after being the club's head coach prior to promotion from the Championship. Cullen previously coached the Warrington Wolves as well as England. He also provides commentary for Sky Sports rugby league coverage.

== Playing career ==
Paul Cullen joined Warrington in 1980 from local Amateur side Crosfields ARLFC, where he stayed for 17 years. He played mainly in the centre position at the club. Nicknamed "psycho", Cullen had an aggressive defence which made him a crowd favourite.

Paul Cullen played stand-off in Warrington's 16–0 victory over St. Helens in the 1982 Lancashire Cup Final during the 1982–83 season at Central Park, Wigan on Saturday 23 October 1982, and played right-centre in the 8–34 defeat by Wigan in the 1985 Lancashire Cup Final during the 1985–86 season at Knowsley Road, St. Helens, on Sunday 13 October 1985.

Paul Cullen played right-centre in Warrington's 4–18 defeat by Wigan in the 1986–87 John Player Special Trophy Final during the 1986–87 season at Burnden Park, Bolton on Saturday 10 January 1987, played loose forward in the 12–2 victory over Bradford Northern in the 1990–91 Regal Trophy Final during the 1990–91 season at Headingley, Leeds on Saturday 12 January 1991, and played left-second-row in the 10–40 defeat by Wigan in the 1994–95 Regal Trophy Final during the 1994–95 season at Alfred McAlpine Stadium, Huddersfield on Saturday 28 January 1995.

In 2008, Cullen was inducted into Warrington's Hall of Fame.

== Coaching career ==
After ending his playing career in 1996, Cullen moved into coaching. He had spells on the coaching staff at Warrington. He worked in both the under-21s and as assistant coach.

In 2000 he moved to Cumbrian side Whitehaven

He accepted his first Super League head coaching role at Warrington in August 2002, replacing David Plange.

Cullen successfully steered Warrington away from relegation, by winning 2 games against Halifax and Castleford ending the season with a thumping 50–10 loss at Wakefield., and towards play-off football. It was this success which bought Cullen an extended rein at the helm due to the loyalty of the fans despite falling short of expectations with the playing roster he had.

In 2006 he was appointed the Head Coach of England 'A' ahead of the Federation Shield tournament in the autumn.

On 26 May 2008, following a run of poor form that culminated in a 36–28 to struggling Castleford, Cullen resigned from his position as Head Coach amid heavy pressure from fans and pundits. He was the longest-serving coach in the league at the time of his departure, having spent six years in charge of the Wires and guided them to a Challenge Cup semi-final and a play-off victory.

His replacement at Warrington was James Lowes, who was later replaced by Tony Smith.

Widnes unveiled Paul Cullen as Head Coach on a two-year deal on 9 March 2009. Speaking on his appointment he said "I'm really excited to be joining Widnes. The plan is simple, we need to get Widnes into Super League where we belong". In November 2010, he moved upstairs at the club to become Director of Rugby while Denis Betts took over his position as head coach.
