= 1986–87 Challenge Cup =

Rugby league competition

1987 Silk Cut Challenge Cup
- Duration: 6 Rounds
- Number of teams: 38
- Broadcast partners: BBC
- Winners: Halifax
- Runners-up: St. Helens
- Lance Todd Trophy: Graham Eadie

The 1987 Challenge Cup was the 86th staging of rugby league's oldest knockout competition, the Challenge Cup. Known as the Silk Cut Challenge Cup for due to sponsorship from Silk Cut, the tournament featured clubs from the 1986-87 Rugby Football League season. It culminated in the final contested by Halifax and St. Helens at Wembley. Halifax won the match 19–18.

== Preliminary round ==
Date	Team One	Team Two	Score
17 Jan	Castleford	Blackbrook	74-6
18 Jan	Hunslet	York	13-0
18 Jan	Workington	Wigan	0-68
21 Jan	Elland	Heworth	6-10
21 Jan	St Helens	Swinton	18-16
22 Jan	Kells	Fulham	4-4
27 Jan-replay	Fulham	Kells	22-14

== First round ==
Date	Team One	Team Two	Score
31 Jan	Castleford	Widnes	16-24
01 Feb	Fulham	Halifax	10-38
01 Feb	Salford	Leeds	0-4
01 Feb	Warrington	Bradford Northern	17-21
03 Feb	Barrow	Batley	54-2
04 Feb	Hull Kingston Rovers	Doncaster	29-14
04 Feb	Bramley	Hull FC	2-10
04 Feb	Featherstone Rovers	Hunslet	12-26
04 Feb	Oldham	Wigan	10-8
04 Feb	Rochdale Hornets	Carlisle	4-4
04 Feb	Runcorn	Leigh	6-25
05 Feb	Dewsbury	St Helens	12-48
05 Feb	Mansfield	Heworth	14-7
05 Feb	Sheffield Eagles	Keighley	6-8
08 Feb	Huddersfield	Whitehaven	10-32
10 Feb	Blackpool	Wakefield Trinity	10-15
11 Feb - replay	Carlisle	Rochdale Hornets	30-22

== Second round ==
Date	Team One	Team Two	Score
14 Feb	Oldham	St Helens	14-24
15 Feb	Bradford Northern	Widnes	6-6
15 Feb	Halifax	Hunslet	29-10
15 Feb	Hull Kingston Rovers	Keighley	42-4
15 Feb	Leeds	Barrow	26-7
15 Feb	Leigh	Carlisle	18-6
15 Feb	Mansfield	Hull FC	7-38
15 Feb	Wakefield Trinity	Whitehaven	2-25
18 Feb - replay	Widnes	Bradford Northern	29-12

== Quarter-finals ==
Date	Team One	Team Two	Score
28 Feb	Halifax	Hull Kingston Rovers	35-7
01 Mar	Hull FC	Leigh	8-12
01 Mar	Leeds	Widnes	7-14
01 Mar	St Helens	Whitehaven	41-12

== Semi final ==
14 March 1987

St. Helens	14 – 8	Leigh
Try: McCormack, Arkwright. Platt; Goal: Loughlin	Report	Try: McCulloch; Goal: C. Johnson (2)

Central Park, Wigan
Attendance: 13,105

28 March 1987

Halifax	12 – 8	Widnes
Try: Pendlebury, Rix; Goal: Whitfield (2)	Report	Try: McKenzie; Goal: Platt (2)

Headingley, Leeds
Attendance: 16,064

== Final ==
Saturday 2 May 1987

Halifax	19 – 18	St. Helens
Try: George, McCallion, Eadie; Goal: Whitfield (3); Drop goal: Pendlebury		Try: Elia, Loughlin, Round; Goal: Loughlin (3)

Wembley, London
Attendance: 91,267
Referee: John Holdsworth (Kippax)
Player of the Match: Graham Eadie

FB	1	Graham Eadie
RW	2	Scott Wilson
RC	3	Colin Whitfield
LC	4	Grant Rix
LW	5	Wilf George
SO	6	Chris Anderson (c)
SH	7	Gary Stephens
PR	8	Ben Beevers
HK	9	Seamus McCallion
PR	10	Keith Neller
SR	11	Paul Dixon
SR	12	Mick Scott
LF	13	John Pendlebury
Substitutions:
IC	14	Brian Juliff
IC	15	Neil James
Coach:
Chris Anderson
Physio:
Martha Mason

FB	1	Phil Veivers
RW	2	Barry Ledger
RC	3	Paul Loughlin
LC	4	Mark Elia
LW	5	Kevin McCormack
SO	6	Brett Clark
SH	7	Neil Holding
PR	8	Tony Burke
HK	9	Graham Liptrot
PR	10	John Fieldhouse
SR	11	Andy Platt
SR	12	Roy Haggerty
LF	13	Chris Arkwright (c)
Substitutions:
IC	14	Paul Round
IC	15	Paul Forber
Coach:
Alex Murphy
