= Chris Arkwright =

Englishrugby league footballer

Personal information
- Full name: Christopher Arkwright
- Born: 8 February 1959 (age 67) St. Helens, England

Playing information
- Height: 6 ft 0 in (1.83 m)
- Weight: 13 st 9 lb (87 kg)
- Position: Centre, Stand-off, Loose forward
Club
Years	Team	Pld	T	G	FG	P
1978–90	St Helens	273	90	0	0	322
1990–92	Runcorn Highfield
	Total	273	90	0	0	322
Representative
Years	Team	Pld	T	G	FG	P
1979–87	Lancashire	4	1	0	0	3
1982	Great Britain U24	1	0	3	0	6
1984	England	1	0	0	0	0
1985	Great Britain	2	0	0	0	0

Coaching information
Club
Years	Team	Gms	W	D	L	W%
1991	Runcorn Highfield
1994–95	Highfield
	Total	0	0	0	0
- Relatives: Jack Arkwright (grandfather)

Christopher Arkwright (born 8 February 1959) is an English former professional rugby league footballer who played in the 1970s, 1980s and 1990s. He played at representative level for Great Britain, England and Lancashire, and at club level for St Helens as a centre, stand-off or loose forward.

== Playing career ==
=== St Helens ===
Arkwright made his debut for St Helens in October 1978.

Arkwright played centre in St Helens 0–16 defeat by Warrington in the 1982–83 Lancashire Cup Final during the 1982–83 season at Central Park, Wigan on 23 October 1982, and played stand-off in the 28–16 victory over Wigan in the 1984–85 Lancashire Cup Final during the 1984–85 season at Central Park, Wigan on Sunday 28 October 1984.

Arkwright played loose forward, and was captain in St Helens' 18–19 defeat by Halifax in the 1986–87 Challenge Cup Final during the 1986–87 season at Wembley Stadium, London on 2 May 1987.

Arkwright missed most of the 1988–89 season due to injury. He required a knee operation towards the end of the 1987–88 season, and suffered an injury to his other knee during his recovery while playing for the reserve team.

=== Runcorn Highfield ===
Arkwright was signed by Runcorn Highfield in October 1990. The transfer fee was set by a tribunal, with Runcorn paying Saints an initial £4,000, plus an additional £2,000 based on future appearances for the club.

In April 1991, he was appointed as player-coach at the club, but quit the role a few months later. He returned to the club (now known as Highfield) as a player in December 1991.

He took charge for a second spell as coach in 1994. He resigned at the end of the 1994–95 season.

=== International honours ===
Arkwright won a cap for England while at St Helens in 1984 against Wales (sub), and won caps for Great Britain while at St Helens in 1985 against New Zealand (sub) (2 matches).

== Personal life ==
Arkwright is the son of the St Helens and Warrington prop of the 1960s, John Arkwright, Jr., and the grandson of the rugby league footballer, John "Jack" Arkwright.
