= 1984–85 Lancashire Cup =

- Structure: Regional knockout championship
- Teams: 16
- Winners: St. Helens
- Runners-up: Wigan

1984–85 was the seventy-second occasion on which the Lancashire Cup completion had been held.

St. Helens won the trophy by beating Wigan by the score of 26–18.

The match was played at Central Park, Wigan, (historically in the county of Lancashire). The attendance was 26,074 and receipts were £6,2139.00

This was the first time in over twenty years that the attendance exceeded 20,000, and it would continue around this level for the next four seasons. The receipts climbed from last year's near-record £13,160.00 to £62,139.

== Background ==
This season the total number of entrants remained at the 16 level.

With this, full sixteen members there was no need for “blank” or “dummy” fixtures or any byes.

== Competition and results ==
=== Round 1 ===
Involved 8 matches (with no byes) and 16 clubs

Game No	Fixture Date	Home team	Score	Away team	Venue	Att	Rec	Notes	Ref
1	Fri 14 Sep 1984	St. Helens	58-14	Huyton	Knowsley Road	2766			
2	Sun 16 Sep 1984	Barrow	38-4	Carlisle	Craven Park	2563			
3	Sun 16 Sep 1984	Fulham	18-25	Swinton	Station Road	1545		1	
4	Sun 16 Sep 1984	Leigh	22-14	Warrington	Hilton Park	5500			
5	Sun 16 Sep 1984	Oldham	26-32	Blackpool Borough	Watersheddings	3366			
6	Sun 16 Sep 1984	Salford	19-14	Whitehaven	The Willows	1700			
7	Sun 16 Sep 1984	Wigan	28-8	Widnes	Central Park	10117			
8	Sun 16 Sep 1984	Workington Town	0-11	Rochdale Hornets	Derwent Park	659			

=== Round 2 - Quarter-finals ===
Involved 4 matches and 8 clubs

Game No	Fixture Date	Home team	Score	Away team	Venue	Att	Rec	Notes	Ref
1	Wed 26 Sep 1984	Barrow	10-26	St. Helens	Craven Park	5573			
2	Wed 26 Sep 1984	Rochdale Hornets	10-22	Leigh	Athletic Grounds	2189			
3	Wed 26 Sep 1984	Swinton	6-32	Wigan	Station Road	6589			
4	Thu 27 Sep 1984	Salford	15-6	Blackpool Borough	The Willows	1917			

=== Round 3 – Semi-finals ===
Involved 2 matches and 4 clubs

Game No	Fixture Date	Home team	Score	Away team	Venue	Att	Rec	Notes	Ref
1	Wed 10 Oct 1984	St. Helens	31-10	Leigh	Knowsley Road	9282			
2	Wed 10 Oct 1984	Salford	8-19	Wigan	The Willows	7492			

=== Final ===
Game No	Fixture Date	Home team	Score	Away team	Venue	Att	Rec	Notes	Ref
	Sunday 28 October 1984	St. Helens	26-18	Wigan	Central Park	26074	62139	2 3	

==== Teams and scorers ====
St. Helens	No.	Wigan
	Teams	
Phil Veivers	1	Shaun Edwards
Barry Ledger	2	John Ferguson
Shaun Allen	3	David Stephenson
Mal Meninga	4	Colin Whitfield
Sean Day	5	Henderson Gill
Chris Arkwright	6	Mark Cannon
Neil Holding	7	Jimmy Fairhurst
Tony Burke	8	Neil Courtney
Graham Liptrot	9	Nicky Kiss
Peter Gorley	10	Brian Case
Andy Platt	11	Graeme West
Paul Round	12	Shaun Wane
Harry Pinner	13	Ian Potter
	Subs	
Johnny Smith (not used)	14	John Pendlebury (for Henderson Gill 64min)
Roy Haggerty (for Phil Veivers 23min)	15	?
Billy Benyon	Coach	Colin Clark and Alan McInnes
26	score	18
24	HT	2
	Scorers	
	Tries	
Mal Meninga (2)	T	Henderson Gill (1)
Roy Haggerty (1)	T	Graeme West (1)
Sean Day (1)	T	Nicky Kiss (1)
	Goals	
Sean Day (5)	G	Colin Whitfield (3)
Referee		Ron Campbell (Widnes)
Man of the match		Mal Meninga - St Helens - Centre
sponsored by		Burtonwood Brewery
Competition Sponsor		Forshaws (Burtonwood Brewery Co Ltd)

Scoring - Try = four points - Goal = two points - Drop goal = one point

=== The road to success ===
First round
Barrow	38
Carlisle	4
St. Helens	58
Huyton	14
Workington Town	0
Rochdale Hornets	11
Leigh	22
Warrington	14
Salford	19
Whitehaven	14
Oldham	26
Blackpool Borough	32
Fulham	18
Swinton	25
Wigan	28
Widnes	8

Second round
Barrow	10
St. Helens	26
Rochdale Hornets	10
Leigh	22
Salford	15
Blackpool Borough	6
Swinton	6
Wigan	32

Semi-finals
St. Helens	31
Leigh	10
Salford	8
Wigan	19

Final
St. Helens	26
Wigan	18

== Notes and comments ==
1 * Fulham did not have a home ground for this season and were very nomadic. This match played at Station Road
2 * Wigan won the coin toss for the home advantage after neither they nor St. Helens wanted to play at the chosen venue, Wilderspool, due to the low capacity 3 * Central Park was the home ground of Wigan with a final capacity of 18,000, although the record attendance was 47,747 for Wigan v St Helens 27 March 1959

== See also ==
- 1984–85 Rugby Football League season
- Rugby league county cups
