= Barry Ledger =

GB & England international rugby league footballer

Personal information
- Born: 19 January 1962 (age 63) St. Helens, England

Playing information
- Position: Wing
Club
Years	Team	Pld	T	G	FG	P
1981–88	St. Helens	214	112	79	9	601
1988–93	Leigh	91	62	0	0	248
1993–95	Swinton	46	13	8	1	69
1996–97	Prescot Panthers	15	6	0	0	24
	Total	366	193	87	10	942
Representative
Years	Team	Pld	T	G	FG	P
1984	England	1	0	0	0	0
1985–86	Great Britain	2	0	0	0	0
1985	Lancashire	1	0	0	0	0

Barry Ledger (born 19 January 1962), also spelled as Barrie Ledger, is an English former professional rugby league footballer who played in the 1980s and 1990s. He played at representative level for Great Britain and England, and at club level for St Helens and Leigh, as a wing.

== Background ==
Ledger was born in St Helens, Lancashire, England. His father, Eric, played on the wing for St Helens in the 1950s.

== Playing career ==
=== St Helens ===
Ledger played right wing in St. Helens 0–16 defeat by Warrington in the 1982 Lancashire Cup Final during the 1982–83 season at Central Park, Wigan on Saturday 23 October 1982, and played right wing in the 28–16 victory over Wigan in the 1984 Lancashire Cup Final during the 1984–85 season at Central Park, Wigan on Sunday 28 October 1984.

Ledger played right wing in St. Helens' 18–19 defeat by Halifax in the 1987 Challenge Cup Final during the 1986–87 season at Wembley Stadium, London on Saturday 2 May 1987.

Ledger's final appearance for the club was in the 1987–88 Premiership final defeat against Widnes. He made over 200 appearances for Saints, and is a St Helens R.F.C. Hall of Fame inductee.

=== Later career ===
In July 1988, Ledger was signed by Leigh for a fee of £24,000. He was signed by Swinton in 1993.

White at Swinton, Ledger received a six-month suspension after testing positive for cannabis.

=== International honours ===
Ledger won a cap for England while at St Helens in 1984, appearing against Wales as a substitute, and won two caps for Great Britain while at St Helens in 1985 against France, and in 1986 against Australia.
