= John Pendlebury (rugby league) =

English RL coach and former rugby league footballer

Personal information
- Born: 18 April 1961 (age 65) Leigh, England

Playing information
- Position: Scrum-half, Hooker, Loose forward
Club
Years	Team	Pld	T	G	FG	P
1979–84	Wigan	122	29	45	1	182
1984–87	Salford	55	7	35	1	99
1987–89	Halifax	74	11	15	1	75
1989–92	Bradford Northern	79	6	4	4	36
1992–94	Leigh	55	6	0	1	25
	Total	385	59	99	8	417
Representative
Years	Team	Pld	T	G	FG	P
1985	Lancashire	1	0	0	0	0

Coaching information
Club
Years	Team	Gms	W	D	L	W%
1997–98	Halifax Blue Sox	48	26	2	20	54
2005–06	Oldham RLFC
	Total	48	26	2	20	54

John Pendlebury (born 18 April 1961) is an English former professional rugby league footballer who played in the 1970s, 1980s and 1990s, and coached in the 1990s. He played at representative level for Lancashire, and at club level for Wigan, Salford, Halifax, Bradford Northern and Leigh, as a scrum-half, hooker or loose forward. and coached at club level for the Halifax Blue Sox.

== Background ==
Pendlebury was born in Leigh, Lancashire, England.

== Playing career ==
=== Wigan ===
Pendlebury played hooker (replaced by substitute Malcolm Smith ) in Wigan's 10-26 defeat by Warrington in the 1980 Lancashire Cup Final during the 1980–81 season at Knowsley Road, St. Helens on Saturday 4 October 1980, appeared as a substitute (replacing wing Henderson Gill) in the 18-26 defeat by St. Helens in the 1984 Lancashire Cup Final during the 1984–85 season at Central Park, Wigan on Sunday 28 October 1984

Pendlebury played loose forward in Wigan's 15-4 victory over Leeds in the 1982–83 John Player Trophy Final during the 1982–83 season at Elland Road, Leeds on Saturday 22 January 1983.

Pendlebury played loose forward in Wigan's 6-19 defeat by Widnes in the 1984 Challenge Cup Final during the 1983–84 season at Wembley Stadium, London on Saturday 5 May 1984, in front of a crowd of 80,116. He was transferred to Salford in December 1984.

=== Halifax ===
Pendlebury was signed by Halifax in November 1986. He played loose forward scored a drop goal, and made a last-gasp tackle on Mark Elia in Halifax's 19-18 victory over St. Helens in the 1987 Challenge Cup Final during the 1986–87 season at Wembley Stadium, London on Saturday 2 May 1987, in front of a crowd of 91,267, and played loose forward the 12-32 defeat by Wigan in the 1988 Challenge Cup Final during the 1987–88 season at Wembley Stadium, London on Saturday 30 April 1988, in front of a crowd of 94,273.

=== Bradford Northern ===
He played loose forward in Bradford Northern's 20-14 victory over Featherstone Rovers in the 1989 Yorkshire Cup Final during the 1989–90 season at Headingley, Leeds on Sunday 5 November 1989, and played loose forward, and was captain in the 2-12 defeat by Warrington in the 1990–91 Regal Trophy Final during the 1990–91 season at Headingley, Leeds on Saturday 12 January 1991.

== Coaching career ==
Pendlebury coached the Halifax Blue Sox in 1997's Super League II, and in 1998's Super League III.
