= 1982–83 Lancashire Cup =

- Structure: Regional knockout championship
- Teams: 16
- Winners: Warrington
- Runners-up: St. Helens

1982–83 was the seventieth occasion on which the Lancashire Cup completion had been held.

Warrington won the trophy by beating St. Helens by the score of 16-0
The match was played at Central Park, Wigan, (historically in the county of Lancashire). The attendance was 6,462 and receipts were £11,732.00

== Background ==
This season saw no new clubs and no withdrawals, leaving the total number of entrants at the 16 level.
With this full sixteen members there was no need for “blank” or “dummy” fixtures or any byes.

== Competition and results ==
=== Round 1 ===
Involved 8 matches (with no byes) and 16 clubs

Game No	Fixture Date	Home team	Score	Away team	Venue	Att	Rec	Notes	Ref
1	Sat 04 Sep 1982	Workington Town	12-20	Barrow	Derwent Park	1935			
2	Sun 05 Sep 1982	Carlisle	16-8	Whitehaven	Brunton Park	3595			
3	Sun 05 Sep 1982	Leigh	32-20	Rochdale Hornets	Hilton Park	3950			
4	Sun 05 Sep 1982	Wigan	18-13	Salford	Central Park	7033			
5	Sun 05 Sep 1982	Blackpool Borough	10-27	Oldham	Borough Park	2013			
6	Sun 05 Sep 1982	Fulham	20-8	Swinton	Craven Cottage	2796			
7	Sun 05 Sep 1982	Warrington	43-5	Huyton	Wilderspool	2042			
8	Sun 05 Sep 1982	Widnes	12-14	St. Helens	Naughton Park	6704			

=== Round 2 - Quarter-finals ===
Involved 4 matches and 8 clubs

Game No	Fixture Date	Home team	Score	Away team	Venue	Att	Rec	Notes	Ref
1	Wed 15 Sep 1982	Barrow	6-9	St. Helens	Craven Park	3282			
2	Wed 15 Sep 1982	Leigh	12-13	Carlisle	Hilton Park	3939			
3	Wed 15 Sep 1982	Wigan	4-15	Fulham	Central Park	6054			
4	Sun 19 Sep 1982	Warrington	16-14	Oldham	Wilderspool	4174			

=== Round 3 – Semi-finals ===
Involved 2 matches and 4 clubs

Game No	Fixture Date	Home team	Score	Away team	Venue	Att	Rec	Notes	Ref
1	Wed 29 Sep 1982	St. Helens	7-7	Carlisle	Knowsley Road	4746			
2	Thu 30 Sep 1982	Warrington	17-8	Fulham	Wilderspool	3356			

=== Round 3 – Semi-finals – replays ===
Involved 1 matches and 2 clubs

Game No	Fixture Date	Home team	Score	Away team	Venue	Att	Rec	Notes	Ref
1	Wed 06 Oct 1982	Carlisle	5-9	St. Helens	Brunton Park	3406			

=== Final ===
Game No	Fixture Date	Home team	Score	Away team	Venue	Att	Rec	Notes	Ref
	Saturday 23 October 1982	Warrington	16-0	St. Helens	Central Park	6462	11732	1	

==== Teams and scorers ====
Warrington	№	St. Helens
	teams	
Steve Hesford	1	Brian Parkes
Paul Fellows	2	Barry Ledger
Ronnie Duane	3	Chris Arkwright
John Bevan	4	Roy Haggerty
Mick Kelly	5	Dennis Litherland
Paul Cullen	6	Steve Peters
Ken Kelly (c)	7	Neil Holding
Neil Courtney	8	Mel James
Carl Webb	9	Graham Liptrot
Tony Cooke	10	Gary Bottell
Bob Eccles	11	Gary Moorby
John Fieldhouse	12	Peter Gorley
Mike Gregory	13	Harry Pinner
??	14	Johnny Smith (for Brian Parkes)
Dave Chisnall (for Tony Cooke)	15	Roy Mathias (for Gary Bottell)
Kevin Ashcroft	Coach	Billy Benyon
16	score	0
3	HT	0
	Scorers	
	Tries	
Paul Fellows (1)	T	
Mick Kelly (1)	T	
Ken Kelly (1)	T	
Bob Eccles (1)	T	
	Goals	
Steve Hesford (2) out of 9 attempts	G	
Referee		J Holdsworth (Leeds)
Man of the match		Steve Hesford - Warrington - Fullback
sponsored by		Burtonwood Brewery
Competition Sponsor		Forshaws (Burtonwood Brewery Co Ltd)

Scoring - Try = three points - Goal = two points - Drop goal = one point

=== The road to success ===
First round
Warrington	43
Huyton	5
Blackpool Borough	10
Oldham	27
Wigan	18
Salford	13
Fulham	20
Swinton	8
Workington Town	12
Barrow	20
Widnes	12
St. Helens	14
Leigh	32
Rochdale Hornets	20
Carlisle	16
Whitehaven	8

Second round
Warrington	16
Oldham	14
Wigan	4
Fulham	15
Barrow	6
St. Helens	9
Leigh	12
Carlisle	13

Semi-finals
Warrington	17
Fulham	8
St. Helens	7-9
Carlisle	7-5

Final
Warrington	16
St. Helens	0

== Notes and comments ==
1 * Central Park was the home ground of Wigan with a final capacity of 18,000, although the record attendance was 47,747 for Wigan v St Helens 27 March 1959

== See also ==
- 1982–83 Rugby Football League season
- Rugby league county cups
