= 1974–75 Player's No.6 Trophy =

- Structure: National knockout championship
- Teams: 32
- Winners: Bradford Northern
- Runners-up: Widnes

This was the fourth season for the League Cup, which was again known as the Players No.6 Trophy for sponsorship reasons.

Bradford Northern won the trophy by beating Widnes by the score of 3–2. The final was played at Wilderspool, Warrington. The attendance was 5,935 and receipts were £3305.

== Background ==
This season saw no changes in the entrants, no new members and no withdrawals, the number remaining at eighteen.
For the first time in the competition, there were no drawn matches.

== Competition and results ==
=== First round ===
The first round consisted of the 30 Rugby Football League professional clubs, plus two amateur teams from the Castleford area, Lock Lane and Kippax White Swan.

| Game No | Fixture date | Home team | Score | Away team | Venue | Attendance | Notes |
|---|---|---|---|---|---|---|---|
| 1 | 27 September 1974 | Salford | 36–5 | Castleford | The Willows | 4,755 | |
| 2 | 28 September 1974 | Barrow | 5–14 | York | Craven Park | 1,000 | |
| 3 | 28 September 1974 | Bramley | 15–6 | Hull F.C. | McLaren Field | 750 | |
| 4 | 28 September 1974 | Leeds | 49–10 | New Hunslet | Headingley | 4,068 | |
| 5 | 28 September 1974 | Wakefield Trinity | 44–10 | Leigh | Belle Vue | 1,984 | |
| 6 | 28 September 1974 | Whitehaven | 32–6 | Lock Lane | Recreation Ground | 537 | |
| 7 | 29 September 1974 | Blackpool Borough | 17–20 | Wigan | Borough Park | 1,595 | |
| 8 | 29 September 1974 | Bradford Northern | 12–8 | Dewsbury | Odsal | 5,287 | |
| 9 | 29 September 1974 | Doncaster | 15–6 | Kippax White Swan | Bentley Road Stadium/Tattersfield | 453 | |
| 10 | 29 September 1974 | Halifax | 11–13 | Keighley | Thrum Hall | 1,990 | |
| 11 | 29 September 1974 | Huyton | 14–12 | Huddersfield | Alt Park, Huyton | | |
| 12 | 29 September 1974 | Oldham | 21–14 | Workington Town | Watersheddings | 1,494 | |
| 13 | 29 September 1974 | Rochdale Hornets | 12–16 | Hull Kingston Rovers | Athletic Grounds | 3,160 | |
| 14 | 29 September 1974 | Swinton | 7–6 | St. Helens | Station Road | | |
| 15 | 29 September 1974 | Warrington | 36–3 | Batley | Wilderspool | 5,000 | |
| 16 | 29 September 1974 | Widnes | 10–5 | Featherstone Rovers | Naughton Park | 4,000 | |

=== Second round ===
Involved 8 matches and 16 clubs

| Game No | Fixture date | Home team | Score | Away team | Venue | Attendance | Notes |
|---|---|---|---|---|---|---|---|
| 1 | 8 November 1974 | Salford | 14–9 | Bramley | The Willows | 4,295 | |
| 2 | 9 November 1974 | Oldham | 3–12 | Bradford Northern | Watersheddings | 2,113 | |
| 3 | 10 November 1974 | Keighley | 4–39 | Leeds | Lawkholme Lane | 2,837 | |
| 4 | 10 November 1974 | Swinton | 18–2 | Wigan | Station Road | 4,420 | |
| 5 | 10 November 1974 | Warrington | 33–6 | Huyton | Wilderspool | 4,756 | |
| 6 | 10 November 1974 | Whitehaven | 14–4 | Doncaster | Recreation Ground | 800 | |
| 7 | 10 November 1974 | Widnes | 35–13 | Wakefield Trinity | Naughton Park | 4,000 | |
| 8 | 10 November 1974 | York | 12–26 | Hull Kingston Rovers | Clarence Street | 3,299 | |

=== Quarter finals ===
Involved 4 matches with 8 clubs

| Game No | Fixture date | Home team | Score | Away team | Venue | Attendance | Notes |
|---|---|---|---|---|---|---|---|
| 1 | 6 December 1974 | Whitehaven | 5–0 | Warrington | Recreation Ground | 2,000 | |
| 2 | 7 December 1974 | Hull Kingston Rovers | 25–17 | Salford | Craven Park (1) | 3,927 | |
| 3 | 8 December 1974 | Bradford Northern | 17–7 | Leeds | Odsal | 6,726 | |
| 4 | 8 December 1974 | Widnes | 15–5 | Swinton | Naughton Park | 5,500 | |

=== Semi finals ===
Involved 2 matches and 4 clubs

| Game No | Fixture date | Home team | Score | Away team | Venue | Attendance | Notes |
|---|---|---|---|---|---|---|---|
| 1 | 4 January 1975 | Widnes | 16-14 | Hull Kingston Rovers | Naughton Park | 4,000 | |
| 2 | 11 January 1975 | Whitehaven | 6-18 | Bradford Northern | Recreation Ground | 3,500 | |

=== Final ===
The final took place on Saturday 25 January 1975, at Wilderspool, Warrington. The attendance was 5,935, with gate receipts of £3,305.

25 January 1975

| Widnes | 2 – 3 | Bradford Northern |
|---|---|---|
| Goals: Dutton | | Tries: Carlton |

Wilderspool, Warrington
Attendance: 5,935
Referee: Fred Lindop (Wakefield)
Player of the Match: Barry Seabourne

==== Teams and scorers ====
| Bradford Northern | No. | Widnes |
|---|---|---|
| | Teams | |
| Stuart Carlton | 1 | Ray Dutton |
| Richard Francis | 2 | Alan Prescott |
| Phil Ward | 3 | Dennis O'Neill |
| Les Gant | 4 | Mal Aspey |
| David Redfearn | 5 | Chris Anderson |
| Mick Blacker | 6 | Eric Hughes |
| Barry Seabourne | 7 | Reg Bowden |
| Kelvin Earl | 8 | Jim Mills |
| Francis Jarvis | 9 | Keith Elwell |
| Phil Jackson | 10 | Barry Sheridan |
| Graham Joyce | 11 | Mick Adams |
| Dennis Trotter | 12 | Bob Blackwood |
| Stan Fearnley | 13 | Doug Laughton |
| Ken Kelly | 14 | Terry Karalius |
| Pattinson | 15 | John Peek |
| | Coach | |

=== Prize money ===
As part of the sponsorship deal and funds, the prize money awarded to the competing teams for this season was as follows:

| Finish Position | Cash prize | No. receiving prize | Total cash |
|---|---|---|---|
| Winner | £5,000 | 1 | £5,000 |
| Runner-up | £2,500 | 1 | £2,500 |
| Semi-finalist | £1,000 | 2 | £2,000 |
| Loser in Rd 3 | £450 | 4 | £1,800 |
| Loser in Rd 2 | £300 | 8 | £2,400 |
| Loser in Rd 1 | £150 | 16 | £2,400 |
| Grand Total | | | £16,100 |

== See also ==
- 1974–75 Northern Rugby Football League season
- 1974 Lancashire Cup
- 1974 Yorkshire Cup
- Player's No.6 Trophy
- Rugby league county cups
