= 1985–86 Lancashire Cup =

1985 Lancashire Cup
- Structure: Regional knockout championship
- Teams: 16
- Winners: Wigan
- Runners-up: Warrington

The 1985–86 Lancashire Cup competition was the seventy-third occasion on which the tournament had been held. Wigan won the trophy by beating Warrington in the final by the score of 34-8.

== Competition and results ==
This season the total number of entrants remained at the 16 level. With this full sixteen members there was no need for “blank” or “dummy” fixtures or any byes.

=== Round 1 ===
Involved 8 matches (with no byes) and 16 clubs

| Game No | Fixture Date | Home team | Score | Away team | Venue | Att | Rec | Notes | Ref |
|---|---|---|---|---|---|---|---|---|---|
| 1 | Sun 15 Sep 1985 | Barrow | 8-12 | Whitehaven | Craven Park | 2011 | | | |
| 2 | Sun 15 Sep 1985 | Leigh | 40-12 | Oldham | Hilton Park | 3500 | | | |
| 3 | Sun 15 Sep 1985 | Rochdale Hornets | 6-17 | Widnes | Athletic Grounds | 1269 | | | |
| 4 | Sun 15 Sep 1985 | Runcorn Highfield | 16-38 | Workington Town | Canal Street | 1000 | | | |
| 5 | Sun 15 Sep 1985 | St. Helens | 72-8 | Carlisle | Knowsley Road | 3630 | | | |
| 6 | Sun 15 Sep 1985 | Salford | 18-14 | Swinton | The Willows | 3482 | | | |
| 7 | Sun 15 Sep 1985 | Warrington | 30-3 | Blackpool Borough | Wilderspool | 2234 | | | |
| 8 | Sun 15 Sep 1985 | Wigan | 24-13 | Fulham | Central Park | 8943 | | | |

=== Round 2 - Quarter-finals ===
Involved 4 matches and 8 clubs

| Game No | Fixture Date | Home team | Score | Away team | Venue | Att | Rec | Notes | Ref |
|---|---|---|---|---|---|---|---|---|---|
| 1 | Wed 25 Sep 1985 | Leigh | 14-18 | Widnes | Hilton Park | 4000 | | | |
| 2 | Wed 25 Sep 1985 | St. Helens | 26-8 | Whitehaven | Knowsley Road | 3853 | | | |
| 3 | Wed 25 Sep 1985 | Warrington | 38-4 | Workington Town | Wilderspool | 2518 | | | |
| 4 | Wed 25 Sep 1985 | Wigan | 22-20 | Salford | Central Park | 11188 | | | |

=== Round 3 – Semi-finals ===
Involved 2 matches and 4 clubs

| Game No | Fixture Date | Home team | Score | Away team | Venue | Att | Rec | Notes | Ref |
|---|---|---|---|---|---|---|---|---|---|
| 1 | Wed 02 Oct 1985 | Warrington | 11-4 | Widnes | Wilderspool | 5633 | | | |
| 2 | Wed 02 Oct 1985 | Wigan | 30-2 | St. Helens | Central Park | 18544 | | | |

=== Final ===
The match was played at Knowsley Road, Eccleston, St Helens, Merseyside, (historically in the county of Lancashire). The attendance was 19,202 and receipts were £56,030. The attendance was again at a very pleasing level, the second of the five-year period when it would reach around the 20,000 level.

This was Wigan's second appearance in two years and a first victory in what would become a run of four victories and five appearances in five successive years.

| Game No | Fixture Date | Home team | Score | Away team | Venue | Att | Rec | Notes | Ref |
|---|---|---|---|---|---|---|---|---|---|
| | Sunday 13 October 1985 | Wigan | 34-8 | Warrington | Knowsley Road | 19202 | 56030 | 1 | |

==== Teams and scorers ====
| Wigan | № | Warrington |
|---|---|---|
| | Teams | |
| Shaun Edwards | 1 | Brian Johnson |
| Gary Henley-Smith | 2 | Brian Carbert |
| David Stephenson | 3 | Paul Cullen |
| Ellery Hanley | 4 | Phil Blake |
| Colin Whitfield | 5 | Rick Thackray |
| Steve Ella | 6 | Ken Kelly |
| Mike Ford | 7 | Andy Gregory |
| Greg Dowling | 8 | Bob Eccles |
| Nicky Kiss | 9 | Carl Webb |
| Shaun Wane | 10 | Bob Jackson |
| Nick Du Toit | 11 | Les Boyd |
| Andy Goodway | 12 | Mike Gregory |
| Ian Potter | 13 | Alan Rathbone |
| | Subs | |
| Steve Hampson (for Gary Henley-Smith 58 min) | 14 | Mark Forster (for Phil Blake 27 min) |
| Brian Case (for Shaun Edwards 27 min) | 15 | Kevin Tamati (for Les Boyd 49 min) |
| | coach | |
| 34 | score | 8 |
| 12 | HT | 8 |
| | Scorers | |
| | Tries | |
| Steve Ella (2) | T | Brian Johnson (1) |
| Nicky Kiss (1) | T | |
| Ellery Hanley (1) | T | |
| Shaun Edwards (1) | T | |
| | Goals | |
| David Stephenson (7) | G | Brian Carbert (2) |
| | Discipline | Alan Rathbone - Sent Off -52 Min - Late Hit on Ian Potter |
| | Discipline | Andy Gregory - Sent Off - 71min - Stamping on Nick Du Toit |
| Referee | | John Holdsworth (Kippax) |
| Man of the match | | Steve Ella - Wigan - stand-off |
| sponsored by | | Burtonwood Brewery |
| Competition Sponsor | | Forshaws (Burtonwood Brewery Co Ltd) |

Scoring - Try = four points - Goal = two points - Drop goal = one point

=== The road to success ===
First round
Wigan | 24
Fulham | 13
Salford | 18
Swinton | 14
St. Helens | 72
Carlisle | 8
Barrow | 8
Whitehaven | 12
Warrington | 30
Blackpool Borough | 3
Runcorn Highfield | 16
Workington Town | 38
Leigh | 40
Oldham | 12
Rochdale Hornets | 6
Widnes | 17

Second round
Wigan | 22
Salford | 20
St. Helens | 26
Whitehaven | 8
Warrington | 38
Workington Town | 4
Leigh | 14
Widnes | 18

Semi-finals
Wigan | 30
St. Helens | 2
Warrington | 11
Widnes | 4

Final
Wigan | 34
Warrington | 8

== Notes ==
1 * Knowsley Road was the home ground of St. Helens from 1890 to 2010. The final capacity was in the region of 18,000, although the actual record attendance was 35,695, set on 26 December 1949, for a league game between St Helens and Wigan

== See also ==
- 1985–86 Rugby Football League season
- Rugby league county cups
