= Steve Hesford =

Zambian rugby league footballer (born 1954)

Personal information
- Born: 12 May 1954 (age 71) Northern Rhodesia

Playing information
- Position: Fullback
Club
Years	Team	Pld	T	G	FG	P
1975–85	Warrington	318	46	1112	47	2416
1986	Huddersfield	2	0	7	0	14
	Total	320	46	1119	47	2430
Representative
Years	Team	Pld	T	G	FG	P
1977	Lancashire	2	1	3	0	9
- Father: Bob Hesford
- Relatives: Bob Hesford (brother); Iain Hesford (brother)

Steve Hesford (born 12 May 1954) is a former professional rugby league footballer who played for Warrington and Huddersfield. His usual position was fullback.

Hesford holds the club record at Warrington for most goals scored (1,112). He was also the club record point scorer before he was passed by Lee Briers in 2011.

== Playing career ==
Steve Hesford played on the wing, and scored a try and seven conversions in Warrington's 26-10 victory over Wigan in the 1980 Lancashire Cup Final during the 1980–81 season at Knowsley Road, St. Helens, on Saturday 4 October 1980, played fullback, scored two conversions, and was man of the match in the 16-0 victory over St. Helens in the 1982 Lancashire Cup Final during the 1982–83 season at Central Park, Wigan on Saturday 23 October 1982.

Steve Hesford played on the wing, scored three conversions and was man of the match in Warrington's 9-4 victory over Widnes in the 1977–78 Players No.6 Trophy Final during the 1977–78 season at Knowsley Road, St. Helens on Saturday 28 January 1978, played at centre, and scored two conversions in the 4-16 defeat by Widnes in the 1978–79 John Player Trophy Final during the 1978–79 season at Knowsley Road, St. Helens on Saturday 28 April 1979, and played fullback, and scored two conversions and two drop goals in the 12-5 victory over Barrow in the 1980–81 John Player Trophy Final during the 1980–81 season at Central Park, Wigan on Saturday 24 January 1981.

Steve Hesford played at centre in Warrington's 15-12 victory over Australia at Wilderspool Stadium, Warrington on Wednesday 11 October 1978.

In 2018, Hesford was inducted into Warrington's Hall of Fame.

== Personal life ==
Hesford is the son of Bob Hesford, a former professional footballer who played as a goalkeeper. His two brothers also played sport; Iain Hesford was also a professional goalkeeper, while Robert "Bob" Hesford is a former rugby union international. Steve Hesford himself played 34 games as a goalkeeper for Northern Premier League club Fleetwood F.C. in 1973 before focussing on initially rugby union with Fleetwood RUFC and then professional rugby league.
