= 1977–78 Player's No.6 Trophy =

- Structure: National knockout championship
- Teams: 32
- Winners: Warrington
- Runners-up: Widnes

This was the seventh season for the competition, from this season the League Cup was known as the John Player Trophy for sponsorship reasons.

Warrington won the trophy, beating Widnes in the final by the score of 9-4. The match was played at Knowsley Road, St Helens, Merseyside. The attendance was 10,258 and receipts were £8429.

== Background ==
This season saw no changes in the entrants, no new members and no withdrawals, the number remaining at eighteen.
This was the second successive season in which there were no drawn matches. The title of the competition was changed from the previous "Players No 6 Trophy" to the "John Player Trophy".

== Competition and results ==
=== Round 1 - First Round ===
Involved 16 matches and 32 Clubs

Game No	Fixture Date	Home team	Score	Away team	Venue	Att	Rec	Notes	Ref
1	Fri 21 Oct 1977	(NDLB) National Dock Labour Board	4-18	New Hunslet	???	3845		1, 2	
2	Fri 21 Oct 1977	Salford	27-8	Rochdale Hornets	The Willows				
3	Sat 22 Oct 1977	Leeds	22-25	Wigan	Headingley				
4	Sun 23 Oct 1977	Featherstone Rovers	25-24	Hull Kingston Rovers	Post Office Road				
5	Sun 23 Oct 1977	Keighley	18-16	Hull F.C.	Lawkholme Lane				
6	Sun 23 Oct 1977	Leigh	31-15	Doncaster	Hilton Park				
7	Sun 23 Oct 1977	Wakefield Trinity	24-5	Batley	Belle Vue			3	
8	Sun 23 Oct 1977	Blackpool Borough	10-31	Warrington	Borough Park				
9	Sun 23 Oct 1977	Bradford Northern	19-12	Bramley	Odsal				
10	Sun 23 Oct 1977	Dewsbury	0-13	Castleford	Crown Flatt				
11	Sun 23 Oct 1977	Halifax	8-9	Cawoods	Thrum Hall	1168		4, 5	
12	Sun 23 Oct 1977	Huddersfield	33-13	Whitehaven	Fartown				
13	Sun 23 Oct 1977	Oldham	16-8	Barrow	Watersheddings				
14	Sun 23 Oct 1977	Swinton	11-28	St. Helens	Station Road	3000			
15	Sun 23 Oct 1977	Widnes	22-6	Huyton	Naughton Park			6	
16	Sun 23 Oct 1977	York	12-20	Workington Town	Clarence Street				

=== Round 2 - Second Round ===
Involved 8 matches and 16 Clubs

Game No	Fixture Date	Home team	Score	Away team	Venue	Att	Rec	Notes	Ref
1	Sat 5 Nov 1977	Widnes	26-19	Castleford	Naughton Park				
2	Sun 6 Nov 1977	Bradford Northern	22-18	Workington Town	Odsal				
3	Sun 6 Nov 1977	Featherstone Rovers	17-10	St. Helens	Post Office Road	5481			
4	Sun 6 Nov 1977	Huddersfield	21-11	Oldham	Fartown				
5	Sun 6 Nov 1977	Keighley	5-14	Leigh	Lawkholme Lane				
6	Sun 6 Nov 1977	Wakefield Trinity	31-7	Cawoods	Belle Vue			4	
7	Sun 6 Nov 1977	Warrington	19-10	Salford	Wilderspool				
8	Sun 6 Nov 1977	Wigan	9-7	New Hunslet	Central Park	5447			

=== Round 3 -Quarter Finals ===
Involved 4 matches with 8 clubs

Game No	Fixture Date	Home team	Score	Away team	Venue	Att	Rec	Notes	Ref
1	Sat 19 Nov 1977	Huddersfield	0-11	Bradford Northern	Fartown				
2	Sun 20 Nov 1977	Featherstone Rovers	11-14	Warrington	Post Office Road				
3	Sun 20 Nov 1977	Wakefield Trinity	12-9	Leigh	Belle Vue				
4	Sun 20 Nov 1977	Widnes	25-0	Wigan	Naughton Park				

=== Round 4 – Semi-Finals ===
Involved 2 matches and 4 Clubs

Game No	Fixture Date	Home team	Score	Away team	Venue	Att	Rec	Notes	Ref
1	Sat 26 Nov 1977	Wakefield Trinity	5-15	Warrington	Belle Vue			7	
2	Sat 3 Dec 1977	Widnes	14-10	Bradford Northern	Naughton Park				

=== Final ===
Game No	Fixture Date	Home team	Score	Away team	Venue	Att	Rec	Notes	Ref
	Saturday 28 January 1978	Warrington	9-4	Widnes	Knowsley Road	10258	8429	8	

==== Teams and scorers ====
Warrington	№	Widnes
	teams	
Derek Finnegan/Derek Finnigan	1	David Eckersley
Steve Hesford	2	Stuart Wright
Billy Benyon	3	Mal Aspey
Frank Wilson	4	Mick George
John Bevan	5	Paul Woods
Ken Kelly	6	Eric Hughes
Parry Gordon	7	Reg Bowden
Roy Lester	8	Bill Ramsey
John Dalgreen	9	Keith Elwell
Mike Nicholas	10	Glyndwr "Glyn" Shaw
Tommy Martyn	11	Mick Adams
Barry Philbin	12	David Hull
Ian Potter	13	Doug Laughton
? Not used	14	? Not used
? Not used	15	Alan Dearden (for Glyndwr "Glyn" Shaw)
	Coach	
9	score	4
4	HT	0
	Scorers	
	Tries	
John Bevan (1)	T	
	Goals	
Steve Hesford (3)	G	
	Drop Goals	
	DG	Paul Woods (2)
Referee		William "Billy" H. Thompson (Huddersfield)
Man of the match		Steve Hesford - Warrington - Wing
Competition Sponsor		Player's №6

Scoring - Try = three points - Goal = two points - Drop goal = one point

=== Prize money ===
As part of the sponsorship deal and funds, the prize money awarded to the competing teams for this season was as follows:

Finish Position	Cash prize	No. receiving prize	Total cash
Winner	£8,000	1	£8,000
Runner-up	£3,500	1	£3,500
Semi-finalist	£1,750	2	£3,500
Loser in Rd 3	£750	4	£3,000
Loser in Rd 2	£600	8	£4,800
Loser in Rd 1	£450	16	£7,200
Grand Total			£30,000

=== The road to success ===
This tree excludes any preliminary round fixtures:

First round
Wakefield Trinity	24
Batley	5
Halifax	8
Cawoods	9
Keighley	18
Hull F.C.	16
Leigh	31
Doncaster	15
Featherstone Rovers	25
Hull Kingston Rovers	24
Swinton	11
St. Helens	28
Blackpool Borough	10
Warrington	31
Salford	27
Rochdale Hornets	8
Widnes	21
Huyton	6
Dewsbury	0
Castleford	13
Leeds	22
Wigan	25
(NDLB) National Dock Labour Board	4
New Hunslet	18
Huddersfield	33
Whitehaven	13
Oldham	16
Barrow	8
Bradford Northern	19
Bramley	12
York	12
Workington Town	20

Second round
Wakefield Trinity	31
Cawoods	7
Keighley	5
Leigh	14
Featherstone Rovers	17
St. Helens	10
Warrington	19
Salford	10
Widnes	26
Castleford	19
Wigan	9
New Hunslet	7
Huddersfield	21
Oldham	11
Bradford Northern	22
Workington Town	18

Third round
Wakefield Trinity	12
Leigh	9
Featherstone Rovers	11
Warrington	14
Widnes	25
Wigan	0
Huddersfield	0
Bradford Northern	11

Semifinals
Wakefield Trinity	5
Warrington	15
Widnes	14
Bradford Northern	10

Final
Warrington	9
Widnes	4

== Notes and comments ==
1 * (NDLB) National Dock Labour Board are a Junior (amateur) club from Hull
2 * Wigan official archives gives the score as 3-18 but RugbyleaguePROJECTS, Rothmans Yearbook 1991-92 and the News of the World/Empire News ANNUAL OF 1978–79 give it as 4-18
3 * Wigan official archives gives the score as 24-3 but RugbyleaguePROJECTS, Wakefield until I die and the News of the World/Empire News Annual 1978–79 give it as 24-5
4 * Cawoods were a Junior (amateur) club from Hull
5 * Cawoods became the first amateur team to beat a professional team in a Rugby League cup tie since 1909
6 * Wigan official archives gives the score as 23-6 but RugbyleaguePROJECTS, Widnes official archives and the News of the World/Empire News annual 1978–79 give it as 22-6
7 * Wigan First Team Players continued with their strike over a bonus payment for the JP second round win over New Hunslet. Wigan chairman Ken Broome issued a statement saying "The situation is bordering on ridiculous. It's beyond money now, it's become a question of whether the players are going to run the club or we are." The actual dispute was over just £5 a man, the club having increased the bonus offer from £55 to £70 but the players wanted £75.
8 * Knowsley Road was the home of St Helens R.F.C. from 1890 until its closure in 2010. The final capacity was 17,500 although the record attendance was 35,695 set on 26 December 1949 for a league game between St Helens and Wigan.

== See also ==
- 1977–78 Northern Rugby Football League season
- 1977 Lancashire Cup
- 1977 Yorkshire Cup
- John Player Trophy
- Rugby league county cups
