= Doug Laughton =

English rugby league coach and footballer (1944–2025)

Personal information
- Full name: Charles Douglas Laughton
- Born: 13 May 1944 Widnes, Lancashire, England
- Died: 16 March 2025 (aged 80)

Playing information
- Position: Second-row, Loose forward
Club
Years	Team	Pld	T	G	FG	P
1963–66	St. Helens	79	14	0	0	42
1967–73	Wigan	183+2	38	0	0	114
1973–79	Widnes	185	38	0	0	114
1974–74	Canterbury-Bankstown	5	0	0	0	0
	Total	454	90	0	0	270
Representative
Years	Team	Pld	T	G	FG	P
1964–74	Lancashire	11	5	0	0	15
1977	England	1	0	0	0	0
1970–79	Great Britain	15	7	0	0	21

Coaching information
Club
Years	Team	Gms	W	D	L	W%
1978–83	Widnes	217	153	10	54	71
1986–91	Widnes	226	153	6	67	68
1991–95	Leeds	153	91	7	55	59
1995–97	Widnes	61	32	2	27	52
	Total	657	429	25	203	65
Representative
Years	Team	Gms	W	D	L	W%
1988–89	Lancashire	2	0	0	2	0

Charles Douglas Laughton (13 May 1944 – 16 March 2025) was an English professional rugby league footballer who played in the 1960s, 1970s and 1980s, and coached in the 1970s, 1980s and 1990s. He played at representative level for Great Britain (captain), winning 15 caps in all, winning a further cap for England, and Lancashire, and at club level for St. Helens, Wigan, Widnes, and Canterbury-Bankstown, as a second-row, or loose forward, and coached at club level for Widnes (three spells) and Leeds.

== Background ==
Laughton was born in Widnes, Lancashire, England on 13 May 1944. He played for St. Paul's the Lowerhouse junior team. He then signed as a professional for St. Helens at the age of 18.

Laughton died on 16 March 2025, at the age of 80.

== Playing career ==
=== St Helens ===
Laughton played loose forward in St Helens' 12–4 victory over Swinton in the 1964 Lancashire Cup Final at Central Park, Wigan on Saturday 24 October 1964.

He played loose forward in St Helens' 0-4 defeat by Castleford in the 1965 BBC2 Floodlit Trophy Final at Knowsley Road, St. Helens on Tuesday 14 December 1965.

Laughton made 79 appearances for St Helens before his transfer to Wigan on 16 May 1967 for £4,000.

=== Wigan ===
Laughton played loose forward in Wigan's 7-4 victory over St Helens in the 1968 BBC2 Floodlit Trophy Final at Central Park, Wigan on Tuesday 17 December 1968, and played loose forward in the 6-11 defeat by Leigh in the 1969 BBC2 Floodlit Trophy Final at Central Park, Wigan on Tuesday 16 December 1969.

He made his first appearance in a Challenge Cup Final in 1970 when Wigan played Castleford.

He played loose forward in Wigan's 15–8 victory over Widnes in the 1971 Lancashire Cup Final at Knowsley Road, St. Helens on Saturday 28 August 1971.

He signed for his home town team Widnes on 6 March 1973 for £6,000.

=== Widnes ===
Laughton played loose forward in Widnes' 14–7 victory over Warrington in the 1975 Challenge Cup Final at Wembley Stadium, London on Saturday 10 May 1975, in front of a crowd of 85,998, played loose forward in the 5–20 defeat by St. Helens in the 1976 Challenge Cup Final at Wembley Stadium on Saturday 8 May 1976, in front of a crowd of 89,982, played loose forward in the 7–16 defeat by Leeds in the 1977 Challenge Cup Final at Wembley Stadium on Saturday 7 May 1977, in front of a crowd of 80,871, and played loose forward in the 12–3 victory over Wakefield Trinity in the 1979 Challenge Cup Final at Wembley Stadium on Saturday 5 May 1979, in front of a crowd of 94,218.

He played loose forward in Widnes' 6–2 victory over Salford in the 1974 Lancashire Cup Final at Central Park, Wigan on Saturday 2 November 1974, played loose forward in the 16–11 victory over Workington Town in the 1976 Lancashire Cup Final at Central Park, Wigan on Saturday 30 October 1976, and played loose forward and scored two tries in the 15–13 victory over Workington Town in the 1978 Lancashire Cup Final at Central Park, Wigan on Saturday 7 October 1978.

He played loose forward in Widnes' 7–15 defeat by Bramley in the 1973 BBC2 Floodlit Trophy Final at Naughton Park, Widnes on Tuesday 18 December 1973, and played loose forward, and was the coach in Widnes' 13–7 victory St. Helens in the 1978 BBC2 Floodlit Trophy Final at Knowsley Road, St. Helens on Tuesday 12 December 1978.

Laughton played loose forward in Widnes' 2–3 defeat by Bradford Northern in the 1974–75 Player's No.6 Trophy Final at Wilderspool Stadium, Warrington on Saturday 25 January 1975, and played loose forward in the 4–9 defeat by Warrington in the 1977–78 Players No.6 Trophy Final at Knowsley Road, St Helens on Saturday 28 January 1978.

He led Widnes to victory over the Australian tourists in 1978.

In 1979, while playing for Widnes, Laughton won the Man of Steel Award.

=== International career ===
During his Wigan career he was chosen to tour Australia/New Zealand with the Great Britain team coached by Hull Legend Johnny Whiteley.

In 1979, he captained Great Britain team on a tour of Australia.

== Coaching career ==
=== Widnes ===
Doug Laughton took over the job of team coach at Widnes when Frank Myler retired from the position in 1978. Immediately, he gained from the Widnes players the same respect for his coaching that he still enjoyed for his playing ability. His first acquisition when he became coach was Mick Burke. He had three coaching spells at Widnes between 1978 and 1996. He coached Widnes to consecutive league championship wins in 1987-88 and 1988–89 and to three successive Premiership Trophy wins in these years and 1989-90. During the 1989–90 Rugby Football League season, he coached defending champions Widnes to their 1989 World Club Challenge victory against the visiting Canberra Raiders.

Laughton recruited the likes of Martin Offiah, Jonathan Davies, Alan Tait, and John Devereux as his Widnes side conquered England and the world in 1989. During his first season as coach, the club gained four major trophies. More recently, they have been the only team to win three successive Premiership titles, and have become World Club Champions.

Doug Laughton was the coach in Widnes' 12-3 victory over Wakefield Trinity in the 1979 Challenge Cup Final at Wembley Stadium on Saturday 5 May 1979, in front of a crowd of 94,218, was the coach in the 18-9 victory over Hull Kingston Rovers in the 1981 Challenge Cup Final at Wembley Stadium on Saturday 2 May 1981, in front of a crowd of 92,496, was the coach in the 14-14 draw with Hull F.C. in the 1982 Challenge Cup Final at Wembley Stadium on Saturday 1 May 1982, in front of a crowd of 92,147, and the 9-18 defeat by Hull in the replay at Elland Road, Leeds on Wednesday 19 May 1982, in front of a crowd of 41,171.

=== Leeds ===
Laughton arrived at Leeds in 1991 and took the club to two successive Challenge Cup Finals but was beaten by Wigan on both occasions. He surprisingly resigned at the end of the 1994–95 season.

== Honours ==
- Open Rugby World XIII: February 1979
- Man of Steel Award: 1979

== Books ==
- Doug Laughton (2003).A Dream Come True: A Rugby League Life. Publisher:London League Publications Ltd; First edition (31 Oct 2003)
