= 1987–88 Challenge Cup =

Rugby league competition

1988 Silk Cut Challenge Cup
- Duration: 6 Rounds
- Broadcast partners: BBC
- Winners: Wigan
- Runners-up: Halifax
- Lance Todd Trophy: Andy Gregory

The 1988 Challenge Cup was the 87th staging of rugby league's oldest knockout competition, the Challenge Cup. Known as the Silk Cut Challenge Cup for sponsorship reasons, the final was contested by Wigan and Halifax at Wembley. Wigan won the match 32–12.

== Preliminary round ==
Date	Team One	Team Two	Score
13 Jan	Kells	Leeds	0-28
15 Jan	Bramley	Sheffield Eagles	6-14
15 Jan	Leigh Miners	Hunslet	4-23
16 Jan	Heworth	West Hull	11-4
17 Jan	Carlisle	Whitehaven	8-8
17 Jan	Warrington	Huddersfield	48-10
20 Jan-replay	Whitehaven	Carlisle	8-22

== First round ==
Date	Team One	Team Two	Score
30 Jan	Wigan	Bradford Northern	2-0
31 Jan	Dewsbury	Widnes	10-38
31 Jan	Doncaster	Batley	18-10
31 Jan	Featherstone Rovers	York	32-21
31 Jan	Fulham	Mansfield	4-16
31 Jan	Heworth	Halifax	4-60
31 Jan	Hull Kingston Rovers	Carlisle	14-6
31 Jan	Hunslet	Hull FC	10-27
31 Jan	Keighley	Workington Town	30-4
31 Jan	Leeds	Castleford	22-14
31 Jan	Leigh	St Helens	12-22
31 Jan	Rochdale Hornets	Barrow	6-4
31 Jan	Runcorn	Springfield	6-8
31 Jan	Salford	Swinton	16-6
31 Jan	Wakefield Trinity	Sheffield Eagles	10-14
31 Jan	Warrington	Oldham	17-6

== Second round ==
Date	Team One	Team Two	Score
13 Feb	Warrington	St Helens	20-24
14 Feb	Doncaster	Mansfield	16-8
14 Feb	Halifax	Rochdale Hornets	30-6
14 Feb	Hull FC	Sheffield Eagles	26-6
14 Feb	Hull Kingston Rovers	Featherstone Rovers	35-26
14 Feb	Keighley	Widnes	2-16
14 Feb	Salford	Springfield	12-10
14 Feb	Wigan	Leeds	30-14

== Quarter-finals ==
Date	Team One	Team Two	Score
27 Feb	Wigan	Widnes	10-1
28 Feb	Hull FC	Doncaster	27-12
28 Feb	Hull Kingston Rovers	Halifax	4-26
28 Feb	Salford	St Helens	22-18

== Semi finals ==
12 March 1988

Wigan	34 – 4	Salford
Try: Edwards (2), T. Iro, Kiss, K. Iro, Hanley; Goal: K. Iro (5)	Report	Try: Blease

Burnden Park, Bolton
Attendance: 20,783

26 March 1988

Halifax	0 – 0	Hull
	Report

Headingley, Leeds
Attendance: 20,534

=== Replay ===
30 March 1988

Halifax	4 – 3	Hull
Try: Anderson	Report	Goal: Pearce; Drop goal: Pearce

Elland Road, Leeds
Attendance: 25,117

== Final ==
30 April 1988

Wigan	32 – 12	Halifax
Try: K. Iro (2), Gill, Lydon, T. Iro, Hanley, Bell, Goal: Gregory, Lydon	Report	Try: Anderson, James; Goal: Whitfield

Wembley, London
Attendance: 94,273
Player of the Match: Andy Gregory

FB	1	Joe Lydon
RW	2	Tony Iro
RC	3	Kevin Iro
LC	4	Dean Bell
LW	5	Henderson Gill
SO	6	Shaun Edwards (c)
SH	7	Andy Gregory
PR	8	Brian Case
HK	9	Nicky Kiss
PR	10	Adrian Shelford
SR	11	Andy Goodway
SR	12	Ian Potter
LF	13	Ellery Hanley
Substitutions:
IC	14	Ged Byrne
IC	15	Shaun Wane
Coach:
Graham Lowe

FB	1	Graham Eadie (c)
RW	2	Martin Meredith
RC	3	Tony Anderson
LC	4	Ian Wilkinson
LW	5	Colin Whitfield
SO	6	Robert Grogan
SH	7	Steve Robinson
PR	8	Neil James
HK	9	Seamus McCallion
PR	10	Keith Neller
SR	11	Les Holliday
SR	12	Paul Dixon
LF	13	John Pendlebury
Substitutions:
IC	14	Dick Fairbank
IC	15	Mick Scott
Coach:
Chris Anderson
