= Thomas Martyn (rugby league) =

England international rugby league footballer

Tommy Martyn
Personal information
- Full name: Thomas Martyn
- Born: 2 August 1946 Leigh, Lancashire
- Died: 6 November 2016 (aged 70)

Playing information
- Position: Second-row
Club
Years	Team	Pld	T	G	FG	P
1969–71	Batley	59+1	14	0	0	42
1971–74	Leigh	91+4	17	0	0	51
1975–81	Warrington	219+1	51	0	1	154
1981–84	Leigh	65+5	6	0	0	19
	Total	445	88	0	1	266
Representative
Years	Team	Pld	T	G	FG	P
1975–79	England	5	2	0	0	6
1974–77	Lancashire	7+1	5	0	0	15
- Relatives: Mick Martyn (brother); Tommy Martyn (son); Shay Martyn (grandson)

Thomas Martyn (2 August 1946 – 6 November 2016) was an English professional rugby league footballer who played in the 1970s and 1980s. He played at representative level for Great Britain (non-test matches), England, and at club level for Batley, Warrington and Leigh, as a second-row.

== Playing career ==
=== Challenge Cup Final appearances ===
Tommy Martyn played at second-row (replaced by substitute Mike Nicholas) in Warrington's 7–14 defeat by Widnes in the 1975 Challenge Cup Final during the 1974–75 season at Wembley Stadium, London on Saturday 10 May 1975, in front of a crowd of 85,998.

=== County Cup Final appearances ===
Tommy Martyn played at second-row and scored a try in Warrington's 26–10 victory over Wigan in the 1980 Lancashire Cup Final during the 1980–81 season at Knowsley Road, St. Helens, on Saturday 4 October 1980, and played at second-row (replaced by substitute Platt) in Leigh's 8–3 victory over Widnes in the 1981 Lancashire Cup Final during the 1981–82 season at Central Park, Wigan on Saturday 26 September 1981.

=== Player's No.6/John Player Trophy Final appearances ===
Tommy Martyn played at second-row in Warrington's 9–4 victory over Widnes in the 1977–78 Players No.6 Trophy Final during the 1977–78 season at Knowsley Road, St. Helens on Saturday 28 January 1978, played at second-row in the 14–16 defeat by Widnes in the 1978–79 John Player Trophy Final during the 1977–78 season at Knowsley Road, St. Helens on Saturday 28 April 1979, and played at second-row, and was man of the match in the 12–5 victory over Barrow in the 1980–81 John Player Trophy Final during the 1980–81 season at Central Park, Wigan on Saturday 24 January 1981.

=== Notable tour matches ===
Tommy Martyn played at second-row in Warrington's 15–12 victory over Australia at Wilderspool Stadium, Warrington on Wednesday 11 October 1978.

=== International honours ===
Martyn won caps for England while at Warrington in 1975 against Wales, in the 1975 Rugby League World Cup against France, and Wales (interchange/substitute), and in 1979 against Wales, and France, and while at Warrington was selected for Great Britain to go on the 1979 Great Britain Lions tour.

== Personal life ==
Tommy Martyn is the father of the rugby league footballer Tommy Martyn, and the younger brother of the Leigh and Great Britain rugby league second-row Mick Martyn.

== Honours ==
Martyn was inducted into the Warrington Hall of Fame in 2011.
