= Mick Martyn (rugby league) =

GB international rugby league footballer

Personal information
- Full name: Michael Martyn
- Born: 13 January 1936; Leigh, England
- Died: 26 November 2017 (aged 81); Warrington, England

Playing information
- Position: Second-row
Club
Years	Team	Pld	T	G	FG	P
1954–67	Leigh	329	189	0	0	567
Representative
Years	Team	Pld	T	G	FG	P
1958–59	Great Britain	2	0	0	0	0
1966	Rugby League XIII	1	0	0	0	0
- Relatives: Thomas Martyn (brother); Tommy Martyn (nephew); Shay Martyn (great nephew)

Michael Martyn (19 January 1936 – 26 November 2017) was an English professional rugby league footballer who played in the 1950s and 1960s. He played at representative level for Great Britain, and at club level for Leigh, as a second-row.

== Background ==
Martyn was born in Leigh, Lancashire, England, and he died aged 81 in Warrington, Cheshire, England.

== Playing career ==
=== Club career ===
Martyn was a one club man spending his entire career at Leigh. After signing for the club in 1952 he made his senior début in 1954 and played 329 for the club becoming the club's all-time leading try scorer with 189 before retiring in 1967.

Whilst at the club he played in two Lancashire Cup finals, the first in the 1955–56 Final as Leigh beat Widnes 26–9 at Central Park, Wigan on 15 October 1955. The second was a 4–15 defeat by St. Helens in the 1963–64 Final at Knowsley Road, St. Helens on Saturday 26 October 1963.

Martyn topped the try scoring table for Leigh in five seasons; 1957–58, 1958–59, 1960–61, 1962–63 and 1963–64. He was awarded a testimonial match in 1963.

=== International honours ===
Martyn was selected for the 1958 Great Britain Lions tour of Australia and New Zealand and while he only played in one test match against Australia on the tour he did score 23 tries in representative games on the tour. A second test appearance against Australia followed during the 1959–60 Kangaroo tour to Britain.

With an appearance for the Rugby League XIII against France in 1966 he made 24 representative appearances.

== Notable relatives ==
Mick Martyn was the elder brother of the rugby league footballer Tommy Martyn, and the uncle of the rugby league footballer Tommy Martyn.
