= 1978–79 John Player Trophy =

- Structure: National knockout championship
- Teams: 32
- Winners: Widnes
- Runners-up: Warrington

This was the eighth season for rugby league's League Cup competition, which was now known as the John Player Trophy for sponsorship reasons.

Widnes won the final against Warrington by the score of 16–4. The match was played at Knowsley Road, St Helens, Merseyside. The attendance was 10,743 and receipts were £11709.

== Background ==
This season saw no changes in the entrants, no new members and no withdrawals, the number remaining at eighteen.
Due to an exceptionally inclement winter (i.e. frost, snow etc.) there were very few matches played during the months of January and February.

== Competition and results ==
=== Round 1 (32 clubs) ===
Game No	Fixture Date	Home team	Score	Away team	Venue	Att	Rec	Notes	Ref
1	Fri 22 Sep 1978	Castleford	18-10	Swinton	Wheldon Road				
2	Fri 22 Sep 1978	Salford	25-7	Rochdale Hornets	The Willows				
3	Sat 23 Sep 1978	Leigh Miners W.	9-21	Halifax	Hilton Park	1621		1	
4	Sat 23 Sep 1978	St. Helens	16-11	Leeds	Knowsley Road	4700			
5	Sun 24 Sep 1978	Barrow	8-26	Bradford Northern	Craven Park				
6	Sun 24 Sep 1978	Doncaster	2-30	Wigan	Bentley Road Stadium/Tattersfield	1332			
7	Sun 24 Sep 1978	Huddersfield	10-21	Widnes	Fartown				
8	Sun 24 Sep 1978	Hull Kingston Rovers	67-11	Oldham	Craven Park (1)			2	
9	Sun 24 Sep 1978	Keighley	20-4	York	Lawkholme Lane				
10	Sun 24 Sep 1978	Leigh	13-13	Huyton	Hilton Park				
11	Sun 24 Sep 1978	Milford	5-38	Dewsbury	McLaren Field	3129		3	
12	Sun 24 Sep 1978	New Hunslet	7-17	Hull F.C.	Elland Road Greyhound Stadium				
13	Sun 24 Sep 1978	Wakefield Trinity	27-2	Batley	Belle Vue				
14	Sun 24 Sep 1978	Warrington	14-4	Blackpool Borough	Wilderspool			4	
15	Sun 24 Sep 1978	Whitehaven	3-9	Featherstone Rovers	Recreation Ground				
16	Sun 24 Sep 1978	Workington Town	17-8	Bramley	Derwent Park				

==== Round 1 replay ====
Game No	Fixture Date	Home team	Score	Away team	Venue	Att	Rec	Notes	Ref
1	Tue 26 Sep 1978	Huyton	8-10	Leigh	Alt Park, Huyton				

=== Round 2 (16 clubs) ===
Game No	Fixture Date	Home team	Score	Away team	Venue	Att	Rec	Notes	Ref
1	Sat 2 Dec 1978	Widnes	11-10	St. Helens	Naughton Park	5030			
2	Sun 3 Dec 1978	Castleford	20-9	Workington Town	Wheldon Road				
3	Sun 3 Dec 1978	Featherstone Rovers	0-7	Warrington	Post Office Road				
4	Sun 3 Dec 1978	Hull F.C.	12-18	Bradford Northern	Boulevard				
5	Sun 3 Dec 1978	Hull Kingston Rovers	16-14	Salford	Craven Park (1)				
6	Sun 3 Dec 1978	Keighley	P	Wigan	Lawkholme Lane			5	
7	Sun 3 Dec 1978	Leigh	17-8	Dewsbury	Hilton Park				
8	Sun 3 Dec 1978	Wakefield Trinity	15-10	Halifax	Belle Vue				

==== Round 2 replay ====
Game No	Fixture Date	Home team	Score	Away team	Venue	Att	Rec	Notes	Ref
1	Wed 6 Dec 1978	Keighley	9-5	Wigan	Lawkholme Lane				

=== Quarter final (8 clubs) ===
Game No	Fixture Date	Home team	Score	Away team	Venue	Att	Rec	Notes	Ref
1	Sun 17 Dec 1978	Bradford Northern	16-13	Wakefield Trinity	Odsal				
2	Sun 17 Dec 1978	Hull Kingston Rovers	23-10	Castleford	Craven Park (1)				
3	Sun 17 Dec 1978	Keighley	4-15	Widnes	Lawkholme Lane				
4	Sun 17 Dec 1978	Warrington	27-0	Leigh	Wilderspool				

=== Semi-finals (4 clubs) ===
Bad weather - Due to an exceptionally inclement (i.e. frost, snow etc.) winter there were very few Rugby League matches played during the months of January and February

Game No	Fixture Date	Home team	Score	Away team	Venue	Att	Rec	Notes	Ref
1	Sat 27 Jan 1979	Warrington	P	Hull Kingston Rovers	Wilderspool			6	
2	Wed 24 Jan 1979	Widnes	21-3	Bradford Northern	Naughton Park				
3	Sun 1 Apr 1979	Warrington	9-5	Hull Kingston Rovers	Wilderspool				

=== Grand final ===
The final was originally scheduled to take place on 27 January 1979, but was rescheduled due to the postponement of the semi-final matches. The final took place on 28 April 1979, a week before the Challenge Cup final.

Fixture Date	Home team	Score	Away team	Venue	Att	Rec	Notes	Ref
Saturday 28 April 1979	Widnes	16–4	Warrington	Knowsley Road	10743	11709	8, 9	

==== Teams and scorers ====
Widnes	No.	Warrington
	teams	
David Eckersley	1	Derek Finnegan/Finnigan
Stuart Wright	2	Michael "Mike"/"Mick" Kelly
Mal Aspey	3	Steve Hesford
Eric Hughes	4	Billy Benyon
Mick Burke	5	Dave Sutton
David Moran	6	Ken Kelly
Reg Bowden (c)	7	Parry Gordon
Jim Mills	8	Roy Lester
Keith Elwell	9	Tony Waller
Glyndwr "Glyn" Shaw	10	Mike Nicholas
Alan Dearden	11	Brian Case
David Hull	12	Tommy Martyn
Mick Adams	13	Alan Gwilliam
? Not used	14	Eddie Hunter (for Ken Kelly)
? Not used	15	? Not used
	Coach	
16	score	4
2	HT	2
	Scorers	
	Tries	
Stuart Wright (1)	T	
David Hull (1)	T	
	Goals	
Mick Burke (3)	G	Steve Hesford (2)
	Drop Goals	
Keith Elwell (2)	DG	
Mick Adams (2)	DG	
Referee		G. Frederick "Fred" Lindop (Wakefield)
Man of the match		David Eckersley - Widnes - Fullback
Competition Sponsor		John Player

Scoring - Try = three points - Goal = two points - Drop goal = one point

=== Prize money ===
As part of the sponsorship deal and funds, the prize money awarded to the competing teams for this season was as follows:

Finish Position	Cash prize	No. receiving prize	Total cash
Winner	£8,000	1	£8,000
Runner-up	£3,500	1	£3,500
Semi-finalist	£1,750	2	£3,500
Loser in Rd 3	£900	4	£3,600
Loser in Rd 2	£700	8	£5,600
Loser in Rd 1	£550	16	£8,800
Grand Total			£33,000

=== The road to success ===
This tree excludes any preliminary round fixtures

First round
Keighley	20
York	4
Doncaster	2
Wigan	30
Huddersfield	10
Widnes	21
St. Helens	16
Leeds	11
New Hunslet	7
Hull F.C.	17
Barrow	8
Bradford Northern	26
Wakefield Trinity	27
Batley	2
Leigh Miners W.	9
Halifax	21
Whitehaven	3
Featherstone Rovers	9
Warrington	14
Blackpool Borough	4
Leigh	13 (10)
Huyton	13 (8)
Milford	5
Dewsbury	38
Hull Kingston Rovers	67
Oldham	11
Salford	26
Rochdale Hornets	7
Castleford	18
Swinton	10
Workington Town	17
Bramley	8

Second round
Keighley	9
Wigan	5
Widnes	11
St. Helens	10
Hull F.C.	12
Bradford Northern	18
Wakefield Trinity	15
Halifax	10
Featherstone Rovers	0
Warrington	7
Leigh	17
Dewsbury	8
Hull Kingston Rovers	16
Salford	14
Castleford	20
Workington Town	9

Third round
Keighley	4
Widnes	15
Bradford Northern	16
Wakefield Trinity	13
Warrington	27
Leigh	0
Hull Kingston Rovers	23
Castleford	10

Semifinals
Widnes	21
Bradford Northern	3
Warrington	9
Hull Kingston Rovers	5

Final
Widnes	16
Warrington	4

== Notes and comments ==
1 * Leigh Miners' Welfare are a Junior (amateur) club from Leigh (formed by merger of Astley & Tyldesley and Hope Rangers - and now renamed as Leigh Miners Rangers)
2 * new record score between professional clubs in the competition - at the time, beating the previous record of 9-51 set when Blackpool Borough lost at home to Leeds by 9-51 in season 1972–73
3 * Milford are a Junior (amateur) club from Leeds
4 * Warrington official archives show the game as being played on 30 September but RUGBYLEAGUEproject and Wigan official archives shows it as played on 24 September
5 * Postponed due to frozen pitch
6 * Postponed due to frozen pitch - was due to be televised by BBC
7 * Postponed due to the postponement of the Semi Final ties caused by frost and other extremely inclement weather.
8 * The Final had been due to be played on Saturday 27 January but was put back due to backlog of semi-finl ties caused by enforced postponement due to extreme inclement weather
9 * Knowsley Road was the home of St Helens R.F.C. from 1890 until its closure in 2010. The final capacity was 17,500 although the record attendance was 35,695 set on 26 December 1949 for a league game between St Helens and Wigan.

== See also ==
- 1978–79 Northern Rugby Football League season
- 1978 Lancashire Cup
- 1978 Yorkshire Cup
- John Player Trophy
- Rugby league county cups
