= Neil Courtney =

GB international rugby league footballer

Personal information
- Born: 13 September 1956 (age 69) Leigh, England

Playing information

Rugby union
Club
Years	Team	Pld	T	G	FG	P
≤1974–74	Bury RUFC

Rugby league
- Position: Prop
Club
Years	Team	Pld	T	G	FG	P
1975–79	St. Helens	62	3	0	0	9
1979–83	Warrington	133	4	0	0	12
1984–85	Wigan	47	1	0	0	4
	Total	242	8	0	0	25
Representative
Years	Team	Pld	T	G	FG	P
1982	Great Britain	1	0	0	0	0

Neil Courtney (born 13 September 1956) is an English former rugby union and professional rugby league footballer who played in the 1970s and 1980s. He played club level rugby union (RU) for Bury RUFC, and representative level rugby league (RL) for Great Britain, and at club level for St. Helens, Warrington and Wigan, as a prop.

== Background ==
Neil Courtney was born in Leigh, Lancashire, England.

== Playing career ==
=== St Helens ===
Courtney signed for St Helens on 21 November 1974, he made his début for St. Helens as a substitute in the 10-9 victory over York at Clarence Street, York on Sunday 6 April 1975, he made his starting début for St. Helens in the 22-31 defeat by Wales in the testimonial friendly at Knowsley Road, St. Helens on Sunday 20 April 1975, he made his competitive starting début for St. Helens in the 15-29 defeat by Featherstone Rovers at Post Office Road, Featherstone on Sunday 5 October 1975, he played his last match for St. Helens in the 21-25 defeat by Salford at The Willows, Salford on Friday 7 September 1979.

=== Warrington ===
He made his début for Warrington on Wednesday 26 September 1979, and he played his last match for Warrington on Sunday 9 October 1983.

During the 1980–81 season, Courtney played at prop in Warrington's 26-10 victory over Wigan in the 1980 Lancashire Cup Final at Knowsley Road, St. Helens, on Saturday 4 October 1980, and played at prop in Warrington's 12-5 victory over Barrow in the 1980–81 John Player Trophy Final at Central Park, Wigan on Saturday 24 January 1981.

Courtney played at prop in the 16-0 victory over St. Helens in the 1982 Lancashire Cup Final during the 1982–83 season at Central Park, Wigan on Saturday 23 October 1982.

=== Wigan ===
Courtney was signed by Wigan in January 1984. He made his début for the club as a substitute in the 10–22 defeat by Fulham RLFC at Craven Cottage, Fulham on 19 February 1984. He scored his only try for Wigan in the 18–36 defeat by Leeds at Headingley, Leeds on 31 March 1985.

Courtney played at prop in Wigan's 18–26 defeat by St. Helens in the 1984 Lancashire Cup Final during the 1984–85 season at Central Park, Wigan on Sunday 28 October 1984. He also played at prop in Wigan's 28–24 victory over Hull F.C. in the 1985 Challenge Cup Final at Wembley Stadium, London on Saturday 4 May 1985.

He played his last match for Wigan as a substitute in the 14–8 victory over New Zealand in the 1985 New Zealand tour of England and France match at Central Park, Wigan on 6 October 1985.

In December 1985, Courtney was taken to hospital after dislocating his shoulder in a training accident. The dislocation had caused internal bleeding, requiring an emergency operation. The incident left him with a partially paralysed left arm.

=== International honours ===
Courtney won one cap for Great Britain while at Warrington in 1982, appearing as a substitute against Australia in the Third Test of the 1982 Kangaroo Tour.
