= Bob Eccles =

English RL coach and former GB international rugby league footballer

Personal information
- Full name: William Robert Eccles
- Born: 10 July 1957 (age 68); St Helens, Lancashire, England

Playing information
- Position: Second-row
Club
Years	Team	Pld	T	G	FG	P
1977–87	Warrington	291	119	30	8	469
1987–88	Springfield Borough	31	4	0	3	19
1988–89	Chorley Borough	10	1	0	0	4
1989–90	Trafford Borough	12+8	1	0	0	4
1991–92	Rochdale Hornets	21	5	15	0	50
1992–94	Barrow	53	23	4	4	104
1995–96	Chorley Chieftains	2	0	0	0	0
	Total	428	153	49	15	650
Representative
Years	Team	Pld	T	G	FG	P
1978–79	Great Britain U-24	2	0	0	0	0
1980–85	Lancashire	3	2	0	0	7
1982	Great Britain	1	0	0	0	0

Coaching information
Club
Years	Team	Gms	W	D	L	W%
1990–91	Chorley Borough
1992–93	Blackpool Gladiators
1995–96	Chorley Chieftains
1999	Rochdale Hornets
	Total	0	0	0	0
- Relatives: Cliff Eccles (brother)

William Robert "Bob" Eccles (born 10 July 1957) is an English former professional rugby league footballer who played in the 1970s, 1980s and 1990s, and coached in the 1990s. He played at representative level for Great Britain and Lancashire, and at club level for Warrington, Springfield Borough and Barrow, as a second-row, and coached at club level for Chorley Borough and Rochdale Hornets.

== Background ==
Bob Eccles was born in St Helens, Lancashire, England.

== Playing career ==
=== International honours ===
Bob Eccles won a cap for Great Britain while at Warrington in 1982 against Australia. He had previously played twice for Great Britain Under-24s.

=== County Cup Final appearances ===
Bob Eccles played right-second-row (replaced by substitute Ian Potter) in Warrington's 26–10 victory over Wigan in the 1980 Lancashire Cup Final during the 1980–81 season at Knowsley Road, St. Helens, on Saturday 4 October 1980, played left-second-row and scored a try in the 16–0 victory over St. Helens in the 1982 Lancashire Cup Final during the 1982–83 season at Central Park, Wigan on Saturday 23 October 1982, and played left-prop in the 8–34 defeat by Wigan in the 1985 Lancashire Cup Final during the 1985–86 season at Knowsley Road, St. Helens, on Sunday 13 October 1985,

=== John Player Trophy Final appearances ===
Bob Eccles appeared as a substitute (replacing loose forward Edwin Hunter) in Warrington's 12–5 victory over Barrow in the 1980–81 John Player Trophy Final during the 1980–81 season at Central Park, Wigan on Saturday 24 January 1981.

=== Club records ===
Bob Eccles made his début for Warrington on Wednesday14 September 1977, he is second in Warrington's "Most Tries in a Season" list with 37-tries scored in the 1982–83 season only bettered by Brian Bevan, 10 years later he topped the try scoring at Barrow with 20 Tries, he also equalled Warrington's "Most Tries in a Match" for a Forward record with 5-tries scored in the 36–15 victory over Blackpool Borough on Sunday 12 December 1982, he played his last match for Warrington on Sunday 17 May 1987, and on Sunday 16 March 2014 he was inducted into the Warrington Hall of Fame.
