= Ian Potter (rugby league) =

Great Britain and England international rugby league footballer

Personal information
- Born: 6 August 1958 (age 67) St. Helens, England

Playing information
- Position: Second-row, Loose forward
Club
Years	Team	Pld	T	G	FG	P
1975–81	Warrington	132	8	0	0	24
1981–84	Leigh	85	15	0	0	47
1984–89	Wigan	200	12	0	0	48
1989–92	Leigh	67	1	0	0	4
	Total	484	36	0	0	123
Representative
Years	Team	Pld	T	G	FG	P
1981	England	2	0	0	0	0
1985–86	Great Britain	8	0	0	0	0
1981–87	Lancashire	5	0	0	0	0

Ian Potter (born 6 August 1958) is an English former professional rugby league footballer who played in the 1970s and 1980s. He played at representative level for Great Britain and England, and at club level for Warrington, Leigh (two spells), and Wigan as a second-row, or loose forward.

== Background ==
Ian Potter was born in St Helens, Lancashire, England on 6 August 1958.

== Playing career ==
=== Warrington ===
Potter made his début for Warrington on Sunday 30 November 1975, and he played his last match for Warrington on Sunday 20 September 1981.

Potter played loose forward in Warrington's 15–12 victory over Australia at Wilderspool Stadium, Warrington on Wednesday 11 October 1978,

Potter played loose forward in Warrington's 9–4 victory over Widnes in the 1977–78 Players No.6 Trophy Final during the 1977–78 season at Knowsley Road, St. Helens on Saturday 28 January 1978, and played second-row in the 12–5 victory over Barrow in the 1980–81 John Player Trophy Final during the 1980–81 season at Central Park, Wigan on Saturday 24 January 1981.

Potter appeared as a substitute (replacing Second-row Bob Eccles) in Warrington's 26–10 victory over Wigan in the 1980 Lancashire Cup Final during the 1980–81 season at Knowsley Road, St. Helens, on Saturday 4 October 1980.

=== Wigan ===
Potter played loose forward in Wigan's 14–8 victory over New Zealand during the 1985 New Zealand rugby league tour of Great Britain and France at Central Park, Wigan on Sunday 6 October 1985.

Potter played in Wigan's victory in the Championship during the 1986–87 season, and also played second-row in Wigan's 8–0 victory over Warrington in the 1986–87 Premiership Final at Old Trafford, Manchester on Sunday 17 May 1987.

Potter played second-row in Wigan's 8–2 victory over Manly-Warringah Sea Eagles in the 1987 World Club Challenge at Central Park, Wigan on Wednesday 7 October 1987.

Potter played loose forward in Wigan's 28–24 victory over Hull F.C. in the 1985 Challenge Cup Final during the 1984–85 season at Wembley Stadium, London on Saturday 4 May 1985, played at second-row in the 32–12 victory over Halifax in the 1988 Challenge Cup Final during the 1987–88 season at Wembley Stadium, London on Saturday 30 April 1988, and played at second-row in the 27–0 victory over St. Helens, and in the 1989 Challenge Cup Final during the 1988–89 season at Wembley Stadium, London on Saturday 29 April 1989.

Potter played loose forward in Wigan's 18–26 defeat by St. Helens in the 1984 Lancashire Cup Final during the 1984–85 season at Central Park, Wigan on Sunday 28 October 1984, played loose forward in the 34–8 victory over Warrington in the 1985 Lancashire Cup Final during the 1985–86 season at Knowsley Road, St. Helens, on Sunday 13 October 1985, played second-row in the 15–8 victory over Oldham in the 1986 Lancashire Cup Final during the 1986–87 season at Knowsley Road, St. Helens, on Sunday 19 October 1986, and played second-row in the 28–16 victory over Warrington in the 1987 Lancashire Cup Final during the 1987–88 season at Knowsley Road, St. Helens, on Sunday 11 October 1987.

Potter played loose forward in Wigan's 18–4 victory over Hull Kingston Rovers in the 1985–86 John Player Special Trophy Final during the 1985–86 season at Elland Road, Leeds on Saturday 11 January 1986, played at second-row in the 18–4 victory over Warrington in the 1986–87 John Player Special Trophy Final during the 1986–87 season at Burnden Park, Bolton on Saturday 10 January 1987, and played at second-row in the 12–6 victory over Widnes in the 1988–89 John Player Special Trophy Final during the 1988–89 season at Burnden Park, Bolton on Saturday 7 January 1989.

=== International honours ===
Potter won caps for England while at Warrington in 1981 against France, and Wales, played second-row in Great Britain's 7–8 defeat by France in the friendly at Stadio Pier Luigi Penzo, Venice on Saturday 31 July 1982, and won caps for Great Britain while at Wigan in 1985 against New Zealand (3 matches), and in 1986 against France (2 matches), Australia (2 matches), and Australia (interchange/substitute).
