= Billy Benyon =

Great Britain and England international rugby league footballer and coach

Personal information
- Full name: William Benyon
- Born: 7 March 1945 (age 81) St. Helens, England

Playing information
- Height: 5 ft 10 in (1.78 m)
- Weight: 12 st 11 lb (81 kg)
- Position: Centre, Stand-off
Club
Years	Team	Pld	T	G	FG	P
1961–77	St. Helens	514	154	1	0	464
1974	Cronulla-Sutherland	5	1	0	0	3
1977–81	Warrington	94	16	0	0	48
	Total	613	171	1	0	515
Representative
Years	Team	Pld	T	G	FG	P
1966–73	Lancashire	12	3	0	0	9
1968–70	England	2	0	0	0	0
1971–72	Great Britain	6	4	0	0	12

Coaching information
Club
Years	Team	Gms	W	D	L	W%
1978–82	Warrington	154	93	6	55	60
1982–85	St Helens	136	87	5	44	64
1986–90	Leigh	109	61	0	48	56
	Total	399	241	11	147	60

William Benyon (born 7 March 1945) is an English former professional rugby league footballer who played in the 1960s and 1970s, and coached in the 1970s, 1980s and 1990s. He played at representative level for Great Britain, England and Lancashire, and at club level for St Helens, Cronulla-Sutherland Sharks and Warrington, as a centre or stand-off, and coached at club level for St Helens and Leigh.

== Background ==
Billy Benyon was born in St. Helens, Lancashire, England.

== Playing career ==
=== St Helens ===
Benyon debuted for St Helens in 1962, aged 17.

Benyon played stand-off in St Helens' 7–4 victory over Swinton in the 1962 Lancashire Cup Final during the 1962–63 season at Central Park, Wigan on Saturday 27 October 1962, played left-centre and scored a try in the 12–4 victory over Swinton in the 1964 Lancashire Cup Final during the 1964–65 season at Central Park, Wigan on Saturday 24 October 1964, played left-centre in the 2–2 draw with Warrington in the 1967 Lancashire Cup Final during the 1967–68 season at Central Park, Wigan on Saturday 7 October 1967, played right-centre in the 13–10 victory over Warrington in the 1967 Lancashire Cup Final replay during the 1967–68 season at Station Road, Swinton on Saturday 2 December 1967, played right-centre in the 30–2 victory over Oldham in the 1968 Lancashire Cup Final during the 1968–69 season at Central Park, Wigan on Friday 25 October 1968, and played right-centre in the 4–7 defeat by Leigh in the 1970 Lancashire Cup Final during the 1970–71 season at Station Road, Swinton on Saturday 28 November 1970.

Benyon played at centre in St Helens' 35–12 victory over Halifax in the Championship Final during the 1965–66 season at Station Road, Swinton on Saturday 28 May 1966, in front of a crowd of 30,165. He also played in the 1970–71 Championship final in the 16–12 victory against Wigan at Station Road, Swinton, scoring the winning try in the last minute of the game.

Benyon played left-centre in St. Helens' 21–2 victory over Wigan in the 1966 Challenge Cup Final during the 1965–66 season at Wembley Stadium, London on Saturday 21 May 1966, in front of a crowd of 98,536, played right-centre in the 16–13 victory over Leeds in the 1972 Challenge Cup Final during the 1971–72 season at Wembley Stadium, London on Saturday 13 May 1972, and played stand-off in the 20–5 victory over Widnes in the 1976 Challenge Cup Final during the 1975–76 season at Wembley Stadium, London on Saturday 8 May 1976.

Benyon played left-centre in St. Helens' 0–4 defeat by Castleford in the 1965 BBC2 Floodlit Trophy Final during the 1965–66 season at Knowsley Road, St. Helens on Tuesday 14 December 1965, played right-centre in the 4–7 defeat by Wigan in the 1968 BBC2 Floodlit Trophy Final during the 1968-69 season at Central Park, Wigan on Tuesday 17 December 1968. played right-centre in the 5–9 defeat by Leeds in the 1970 BBC2 Floodlit Trophy Final during the 1970–71 season at Headingley, Leeds on Tuesday 15 December 1970, played right-centre in the 8–2 victory over Rochdale Hornets in the 1971 BBC2 Floodlit Trophy Final during the 1971–72 season at Headingley, Leeds on Tuesday 14 December 1971, and played right-centre and scored a try in the 22–2 victory over Dewsbury in the 1975 BBC2 Floodlit Trophy Final during the 1975–76 season at Knowsley Road, St. Helens on Tuesday 16 December 1975.

Benyon played stand-off in St. Helens' 2–25 defeat by the 1975 NSWRFL season premiers, Eastern Suburbs Roosters in the unofficial 1976 World Club Challenge at Sydney Cricket Ground on Tuesday 29 June 1976.

=== Warrington ===
Benyon played right-centre in Warrington's 9–4 victory over Widnes in the 1977–78 Players No.6 Trophy Final during the 1977–78 season at Knowsley Road, St. Helens on Saturday 28 January 1978, and played left-centre in the 4–16 defeat by Widnes in the 1978–79 John Player Trophy Final during the 1978–79 season at Knowsley Road, St. Helens on Saturday 28 April 1979.

=== International honours ===
Benyon won caps for England while at St Helens in 1968 against Wales, in 1970 against Wales, and won caps for Great Britain while at St Helens in 1971 against France (2 matches), New Zealand, and New Zealand (interchange/substitute), and in 1972 against France (2 matches).

=== Notable tour matches ===
Benyon played right centre ie number three in St Helens 11-7 victory over Australia national rugby league team at Knowsley Road on 13 November 1973. Billy had a superb game in an under strength Saints side who beat a team contains Australian legends Bobby Fulton and Artie Beetson amongst others.

Benyon played left-centre in Warrington's 15–12 victory over Australia at Wilderspool Stadium, Warrington on Wednesday 11 October 1978.

== Coaching career ==
=== County Cup Final appearances ===
Billy Benyon was the coach in Warrington's 26–10 victory over Wigan in the 1980 Lancashire Cup Final replay during the 1980–81 season at Knowsley Road, St. Helens on Saturday 4 October 1980, in St. Helens' 0–16 defeat by Warrington in the 1982 Lancashire Cup Final during the 1982–83 season at Central Park, Wigan on Saturday 23 October 1982, and in the 26–18 victory over Wigan in the 1984 Lancashire Cup Final during the 1984–85 season at Central Park, Wigan on Sunday 28 October 1984.

== Honoured at St Helens R.F.C. ==
Billy Benyon is a St Helens R.F.C. Hall of Fame inductee.
