= 1980–81 Lancashire Cup =

- Structure: Regional knockout championship
- Teams: 14
- Winners: Warrington
- Runners-up: Wigan

The 1980–81 Lancashire Cup (known as the Forshaws Lancashire Cup for sponsorship reasons) was the 68th staging of the rugby league knockout competition, the Lancashire Cup.

Warrington won the trophy with a 26–10 victory over Second Division side Wigan.

== Background ==
The total number of teams entering the competition remained at last season’s total of 14 with no junior/amateur clubs taking part.

== Competition and results ==
=== First Round ===
Involved six matches and 12 clubs. Barrow and Whitehaven received byes into the next round. Huyton's match against Warrington was moved to Wilderspool due to vandalism at Huyton's home ground, Alt Park.

Game No	Fixture Date	Home team	Score	Away team	Venue	Att	Ref
1	15 August 1980	Swinton	5–11	Oldham	Station Road	2026	
2	17 August 1980	Blackpool Borough	2–31	Widnes	Borough Park	2200	
3	17 August 1980	Huyton	2–31	Warrington	Wilderspool	1937	
4	17 August 1980	Salford	23–12	Leigh	The Willows	3579	
5	17 August 1980	Wigan	25–10	Rochdale Hornets	Central Park	3562	
6	17 August 1980	Workington Town	5–15	St. Helens	Derwent Park	2957	

=== Second Round ===
Involved four matches and eight clubs

Game No	Fixture Date	Home team	Score	Away team	Venue	Att	Ref
1	24 August 1980	Barrow	9–16	Warrington	Craven Park	3328	
2	24 August 1980	Oldham	15–13	Salford	Watersheddings	3445	
3	24 August 1980	Whitehaven	10–13	Wigan	Recreation Ground	3910	
4	24 August 1980	Widnes	22–20	St. Helens	Naughton Park	8427	

=== Semi-finals ===
Involved two matches and four clubs.

Game No	Fixture Date	Home team	Score	Away team	Venue	Att	Ref
1	10 September 1980	Oldham	2–11	Warrington	Watersheddings	3963	
2	10 September 1980	Widnes	10–14	Wigan	Naughton Park	6563	

=== Final ===
The final was played at Knowsley Road, St Helens, with an attendance of 6,279 and gate receipts of £8,629. This was Warrington's seventh Lancashire Cup win, and their first since 1965.

4 October 1980

Warrington	26 – 10	Wigan
Tries: Martyn, Bevan, Thackray, Hesford; Goals: Hesford (7)		Tries: Fairbairn, Ramsdale; Goals: Fairbairn (2)

Knowsley Road, St Helens
Attendance: 6,279
Referee: Gerry Kershaw (Easingwold)
Player of the Match: Tony Waller

==== Teams ====
Warrington	№	Wigan
Derek Finnegan	1	George Fairbairn (c)
Richard Thackray	2	Dennis Ramsdale
Ian Duane	3	Dave Willicombe
John Bevan	4	Steve Davies
Steve Hesford	5	Jimmy Hornby
Ken Kelly (c)	6	Martin Foy
Alan Gwilliam	7	Les Bolton
Neil Courtney	8	Steve Breheny
Tony Waller	9	John Pendlebury
Brian Case	10	Steve O'Neill
Tommy Martyn	11	Bill Melling
Bob Eccles	12	John Clough
Edwin Hunter	13	Terry Hollingsworth
Tony Worrall	14	Bernard Coyle (for Les Bolton)
Ian Potter (for Bob Eccles)	15	Malcolm Smith (for John Pendlebury)
Billy Benyon	Coach	George Fairbairn

=== The road to success ===
First round
Swinton	5
Oldham	11
Salford	23
Leigh	12
Barrow
bye
Huyton	2
Warrington	31
Blackpool Borough	2
Widnes	31
Workington Town	5
St. Helens	15
Whitehaven
bye
Wigan	25
Rochdale Hornets	10

Second round
Oldham	15
Salford	13
Barrow	9
Warrington	16
Widnes	22
St. Helens	20
Whitehaven	10
Wigan	13

Semi-finals
Oldham	2
Warrington	11
Widnes	10
Wigan	14

Final
Warrington	26
Wigan	10

== See also ==
- 1980–81 Rugby Football League season
- Rugby league county cups
