= Regal Trophy =

Knock-out competition for British rugby league football clubs between 1971 and 1996

- Sport: Rugby league
- Formerly known as: Player's No.6 Trophy; John Player Trophy; John Player Special Trophy
- Instituted: 1971
- Ceased: 1996
- Countries: United Kingdom (RFL); France
- Last winners: Wigan (1996)
- Most titles: Wigan (8 titles)

The Regal Trophy was an annual knock-out competition for British rugby league football clubs. Organised by the Rugby Football League (RFL), the competition was open to all professional clubs in the British rugby league system, but amateur teams and French clubs also took part at various points during its existence.

First held in 1971–72, the tournament was initially played over five rounds. A preliminary round was added in 1981–82 to accommodate the increasing number of professional teams in the sport. The fixtures were normally played during the early part of the season, with the final usually taking place at a neutral venue in January. The tournament was regarded as less prestigious than the RFL's primary cup competition, the Challenge Cup, and was discontinued when rugby league became a summer sport in 1996.

During its existence, the competition was always referred to by its sponsorship name. The initial sponsors were the tobacco manufacturer John Player & Sons with Regal taking over in 1989 until the competition's end. Over the years, the competition was known as the Player's No.6 Trophy (1971–77), the John Player Trophy (1977–83) and the John Player Special Trophy (1983–89), before finally becoming the Regal Trophy in 1989.

== History ==
The competition was introduced in 1971 as the Player's No.6 Trophy, with sponsors John Player & Sons announcing an £11,000 prize fund for the inaugural season. The competition was open to all professional Rugby Football League clubs, with a small number of amateur clubs taking part in most seasons.

In 1977–78, Hull-based Cawoods defeated Halifax 9–8 in the first round of the competition, the first time an amateur team had defeated professional opposition in any competition since 1909.

In 1989, a new sponsorship deal was made with Imperial Tobacco, and the competition was rebranded as the Regal Trophy.

In 1992, several French clubs entered the competition. This marked the first time that French teams had participated in a British rugby league competition, and clubs would later also be accepted into the Challenge Cup and domestic leagues.

Following the introduction of the Super League in 1996, the Regal Trophy faced an uncertain future, and was ultimately abandoned. The BBC could no longer fit the competition into its TV schedule due to the switch to playing rugby league in the summer, and Regal were unwilling to continue sponsoring the tournament without television coverage.

== List of finals ==
Season	Winners	Score	Runner-up	Venue	Attendance	Date
Player's No.6 Trophy
1971–72	Halifax	22–11	Wakefield Trinity	Odsal, Bradford	7,975	Saturday 22 January 1972
1972–73	Leeds	12–7	Salford	Fartown Ground, Huddersfield	10,102	Saturday 24 March 1973
1973–74	Warrington	27–16	Rochdale Hornets	Central Park, Wigan	9,347	Saturday 9 February 1974
1974–75	Bradford Northern	3–2	Widnes	Wilderspool, Warrington	5,935	Saturday 25 January 1975
1975–76	Widnes	19–13	Hull F.C.	Headingley, Leeds	9,035	Saturday 24 January 1976
1976–77	Castleford	25–15	Blackpool Borough	The Willows, Salford	4,512	Saturday 22 January 1977
1977–78	Warrington	9–4	Widnes	Knowsley Road, St Helens	10,258	Saturday 28 January 1978
John Player Trophy
1978–79	Widnes	16–4	Warrington	Knowsley Road, St Helens	10,743	Saturday 28 April 1979
1979–80	Bradford Northern	6–0	Widnes	Headingley, Leeds	9,909	Saturday 5 January 1980
1980–81	Warrington	12–5	Barrow	Central Park, Wigan	12,820	Saturday 24 January 1981
1981–82	Hull F.C.	12–4	Hull Kingston Rovers	Headingley, Leeds	25,165	Saturday 23 January 1982
1982–83	Wigan	15–4	Leeds	Elland Road, Leeds	19,553	Saturday 22 January 1983
John Player Special Trophy
1983–84	Leeds	18–10	Widnes	Central Park, Wigan	9,510	Saturday 14 January 1984
1984–85	Hull Kingston Rovers	12–0	Hull F.C.	Boothferry Park, Hull	25,326	Saturday 26 January 1985
1985–86	Wigan	11–8	Hull Kingston Rovers	Elland Road, Leeds	17,573	Saturday 11 January 1986
1986–87	Wigan	18–4	Warrington	Burnden Park, Bolton	21,144	Saturday 10 January 1987
1987–88	St Helens	15–14	Leeds	Central Park, Wigan	16,669	Saturday 9 January 1988
1988–89	Wigan	12–6	Widnes	Burnden Park, Bolton	20,709	Saturday 7 January 1989
Regal Trophy
1989–90	Wigan	24–12	Halifax	Headingley, Leeds	17,810	Saturday 13 January 1990
1990–91	Warrington	12–2	Bradford Northern	Headingley, Leeds	11,154	Saturday 12 January 1991
1991–92	Widnes	24–0	Leeds	Central Park, Wigan	15,070	Saturday 11 January 1992
1992–93	Wigan	15–8	Bradford Northern	Elland Road, Leeds	13,221	Saturday 23 January 1993
1993–94	Castleford	33–2	Wigan	Headingley, Leeds	15,626	Saturday 22 January 1994
1994–95	Wigan	40–10	Warrington	McAlpine Stadium, Huddersfield	19,636	Saturday 28 January 1995
1995–96	Wigan	25–16	St Helens	McAlpine Stadium, Huddersfield	17,590	Saturday 13 January 1996

=== Wins by club ===
Rank	Club	Wins	Winning seasons
1	Wigan	8	1982–83, 1985–86, 1986–87, 1988–89, 1989–90, 1992–93, 1994–95, 1995–96
2	Warrington	4	1973–74, 1977–78, 1980–81, 1990–91
3	Widnes	3	1975–76, 1978–79, 1991–92
4=	Bradford Northern	2	1974–75, 1979–80
4=	Castleford	2	1976–77, 1993–94
4=	Leeds	2	1972–73, 1983–84
5=	Halifax	1	1971–72
5=	Hull F.C.	1	1981–82
5=	Hull Kingston Rovers	1	1984–85
5=	St. Helens	1	1987–88

== Media coverage ==
The BBC was the exclusive broadcaster of the competition throughout its history. Matches were broadcast on the BBC's Grandstand programme, showing one live match per round. Depending on the TV schedule, only the second-half was shown for some matches in the earlier rounds, but from the semi-final onwards, the entire match was usually covered.
