= Johnny Smith (rugby league) =

Australian rugby league footballer

Personal information
- Full name: Johnny Smith
- Born: 10 July 1923 Sydney, New South Wales, Australia
- Died: 2 October 2007 (aged 84) Camden Haven, New South Wales, Australia

Playing information
- Position: Second-row
Club
Years	Team	Pld	T	G	FG	P
1945–46	North Sydney	12	5	0	0	15
1947–50	Parramatta	46	5	0	0	15
	Total	58	10	0	0	30

Johnny Smith (1923–2007) was an Australian rugby league footballer who played in the 1940s. He played for North Sydney and Parramatta. He was a foundation player for Parramatta and played in the club's first ever game.

== Playing career ==
Smith made his debut for North Sydney in 1945 and spent two years with the club as they missed out on the finals on both occasions. In 1947, Smith joined Parramatta who had just been admitted into the competition. On 12 April 1947 Parramatta played in their first ever match as a club against Newtown at Cumberland Oval. The game finished in a 34–12 defeat and Parramatta went on to claim the wooden spoon that year after winning only 3 games. Smith went on to play another 3 seasons with the club as they struggled near the bottom of the table but nearly qualified for the finals in 1949 only to miss out by 2 competition points.

== Post playing ==
Smith went on to become a trainer at Parramatta over the next 30 years and was made a life member of the club in 1976. He died on 2 October 2007.
