= 1986–87 Rugby Football League season =

- League: Stones Bitter Championship
- Teams: First Division: 16; Second Division: 18

First Division
- Champions: Wigan (10th title)
- Premiership winners: Wigan
- Man of Steel Award: (England) Ellery Hanley
- Top point-scorer: (England) Paul Loughlin (424)
- Top try-scorer: (England) Ellery Hanley (63)

Promotion and relegation
- Promoted from Second Division: Hunslet; Swinton
- Relegated to Second Division: Oldham; Featherstone Rovers; Barrow; Wakefield Trinity

Second Division
- Champions: Hunslet
- Runners-up: Swinton
- Top try-scorer: Derek Bate (31)

The 1986–87 Rugby Football League season was the 92nd season of rugby league football. Sixteen clubs competed for the Championship which was determined by League position.

== Season summary ==
Stones Bitter League Champions were Wigan for the tenth time in their history, losing only two league games all season - both to Warrington. Oldham, Featherstone Rovers, Barrow and Wakefield Trinity were relegated. A one-off 'two-up, four-down' promotion was used to reduce the top division to 14 clubs.

A complicated fixture formula was introduced in the Second Division and continued until the 1991–92 season. 2nd Division Champions were Hunslet, and Swinton were also promoted.

A Premiership competition for Second Division teams was introduced for the first time. The structure was the same as the existing First Division Premiership, with the teams in the top eight league positions qualifying for an end-of-season knockout tournament. The finals of both competitions were played on the same day as a double header at Old Trafford.

== First Division ==
Pos	Team	Pld	W	D	L	PF	PA	PP	Pts	Qualification or relegation
1	Wigan (C)	30	28	0	2	941	193	487.6	56	Qualification for Premiership first round
2	St Helens	30	20	1	9	835	465	179.6	41	Qualification for Premiership first round
3	Warrington	30	20	1	9	728	464	156.9	41	Qualification for Premiership first round
4	Castleford	30	20	0	10	631	429	147.1	40	Qualification for Premiership first round
5	Halifax	30	17	1	12	553	487	113.6	35	Qualification for Premiership first round
6	Hull Kingston Rovers	30	16	0	14	446	531	84.0	32	Qualification for Premiership first round
7	Bradford Northern	30	15	1	14	555	550	100.9	31	Qualification for Premiership first round
8	Widnes	30	14	0	16	598	613	97.6	28	Qualification for Premiership first round
9	Salford	30	14	0	16	509	656	77.6	28	
10	Leigh	30	13	1	16	549	610	90.0	27	
11	Hull	30	13	1	16	538	650	82.8	27	
12	Leeds	30	13	0	17	565	571	98.9	26	
13	Oldham (R)	30	13	0	17	554	679	81.6	26	Relegated
14	Featherstone Rovers (R)	30	8	1	21	498	776	64.2	17	Relegated
15	Barrow (R)	30	7	2	21	456	725	62.9	16	Relegated
16	Wakefield Trinity (R)	30	4	1	25	386	943	40.9	9	Relegated

Rules for classification: 1) Points; 2) Points scored percentage (points scored divided by points conceded)
(C) Champions; (R) Relegated

== Second Division ==
Pos	Team	Pld	W	D	L	PF	PA	PP	Pts	Promotion or qualification
1	Hunslet (C, P)	28	25	0	3	722	218	331.2	50	Promotion to First Division Qualification for Divisional Premiership first round
2	Swinton (P)	28	23	1	4	713	323	220.7	47	Promotion to First Division Qualification for Divisional Premiership first round
3	Whitehaven	28	21	1	6	577	304	189.8	43	Qualification for Divisional Premiership first round
4	Doncaster	28	20	1	7	586	388	151.0	41	Qualification for Divisional Premiership first round
5	Rochdale Hornets	28	19	1	8	519	369	140.7	39	Qualification for Divisional Premiership first round
6	Sheffield Eagles	28	17	0	11	625	426	146.7	34	Qualification for Divisional Premiership first round
7	Bramley	28	16	0	12	407	440	92.5	32	Qualification for Divisional Premiership first round
8	Carlisle	28	15	1	12	463	446	103.8	31	Qualification for Divisional Premiership first round
9	Blackpool Borough	28	14	0	14	530	477	111.1	28	
10	York	28	11	0	17	492	537	91.6	22	
11	Runcorn Highfield	28	10	1	17	391	533	73.4	21	
12	Fulham	28	8	2	18	461	632	72.9	18	
13	Batley	28	9	0	19	335	528	63.4	18	
14	Workington Town	28	9	0	19	405	652	62.1	18	
15	Huddersfield Barracudas	28	8	0	20	456	673	67.8	16	
16	Mansfield Marksman	28	8	0	20	366	592	61.8	16	
17	Dewsbury	28	8	0	20	328	563	58.3	16	
18	Keighley	28	7	0	21	366	641	57.1	14	

Rules for classification: 1) Points; 2) Points scored percentage (points scored divided by points conceded)
(C) Champions; (P) Promoted

== Premierships ==
=== First Division Premiership ===
17 May 1987

Wigan (1)	8-0	Warrington (3)
G-Gill, Stephenson; T-Lydon

Old Trafford
Attendance: 38,756
Referee: Kevin Allatt
Player of the Match: Joe Lydon

=== Divisional Premiership ===
17 May 1987

Swinton (2)	27 – 10	Hunslet (1)
Tries: Bate, Derbyshire, Grima, Lee, Ainsworth; Goals: Rippon (3); Drop goals: L. Holliday		Tries: Bateman (2); Goals: Platt

Old Trafford, Manchester
Player of the Match: Gary Ainsworth

== Sources ==
- 1986-87 Rugby Football League season at wigan.rlfans.com
