= Bobby Wanbon =

Welsh rugby footballer (1943–2022)

Personal information
- Full name: Robert Wanbon
- Born: 16 November 1943 Port Talbot, Wales
- Died: 8 November 2022 (aged 78) Tenerife, Spain

Playing information

Rugby union
- Position: Number eight
Club
| Years | Team | Pld | T | G | FG | P |
|---|---|---|---|---|---|---|
| | Aberavon RFC |
Representative
| Years | Team | Pld | T | G | FG | P |
| 1968 | Wales | 1 | 1 | 0 | 0 | 3 |

Rugby league
- Position: Prop, Second-row
Club
| Years | Team | Pld | T | G | FG | P |
|---|---|---|---|---|---|---|
| 1968–71 | St Helens | 79+16 | 18 | 0 | 0 | 54 |
| 1971–78 | Warrington | 148+15 | 22 | 0 | 0 | 66 |
| | Total | 258 | 40 | 0 | 0 | 120 |
Representative
| Years | Team | Pld | T | G | FG | P |
| 1968–75 | Wales | 8 | 0 | 0 | 0 | 0 |

Robert Wanbon (16 November 1943 – 8 November 2022) was a Welsh dual-code international rugby union and professional rugby league footballer who played in the 1960s and 1970s. He played representative level rugby union (RU) for Wales, and at club level for Aberavon RFC, as a number eight, and representative level rugby league (RL) for Wales, and at club level for St. Helens and Warrington, as a prop or second-row.

== Background ==
Wanbon was born in Port Talbot, Wales.

== Playing career ==
=== Club career ===
Wanbon signed for St. Helens (RL) from Aberavon (RU) nine-days after appearing for Wales (RU) against England (RU), for a signing-on fee of £4500 (based on increases in average earnings, this would be approximately £124,400 in 2013).

Wanbon played at prop in Warrington's 24-9 victory over Featherstone Rovers in the 1974 Challenge Cup Final during the 1973–74 season at Wembley Stadium, London on Saturday 11 May 1974, in front of a crowd of 77,400, and played at prop in the 7-14 defeat by Widnes in the 1975 Challenge Cup Final during the 1974–75 season at Wembley Stadium, London on Saturday 10 May 1975, in front of a crowd of 85,998.

Wanbon did not play (Dave Wright or Gilly Wright played at prop) in Warrington's 0-0 draw with Salford in the 1974 BBC2 Floodlit Trophy Final during the 1974–75 season at The Willows, Salford on Tuesday 17 December 1974, and played at prop in the 5-10 defeat by Salford in the 1974 BBC2 Floodlit Trophy Final replay during the 1974–75 season at Wilderspool Stadium, Warrington on Tuesday 28 January 1975.

Wanbon played at second-row in Warrington's 27-16 victory over Rochdale Hornets in the 1973–74 Player's No.6 Trophy Final during the 1973–74 season at Central Park, Wigan on Saturday 9 February 1974.

Wanbon played at second-row in Warrington's 4-0 victory over Featherstone Rovers in the 1973–74 Captain Morgan Trophy Final during the 1973–74 season at The Willows, Salford on Saturday 26 January 1974, in front of a crowd of 5,259.

Wanbon was inducted into the Warrington Hall of Fame in 2012.

=== International honours ===
Wanbon won a cap for Wales (RU) while at Aberavon in 1968 against England on Saturday 20 January 1968, scoring a try.

He was one of four Aberavon RFC players in the Welsh team that day, the others were Billy Mainwaring, Maxwell Lloyd Wiltshire and Paul James Wheeler.

He won caps for Wales (RL) while at Warrington in the 1975 Rugby League World Cup against England, Australia, and New Zealand.

=== Death ===
Bobby Wanbon died on 8 November 2022 in Tenerife, Spain.
