= Derek Noonan =

England international rugby league footballer

Personal information
- Born: 1 February 1947; St. Helens, England
- Died: 1 May 2009 (aged 62); St. Helens, England

Playing information
- Weight: 12 st 0 lb (76 kg)

Rugby union
- Position: Wing
Club
Years	Team	Pld	T	G	FG	P
	St. Helens RUFC

Rugby league
- Position: Centre
Club
Years	Team	Pld	T	G	FG	P
1971–76	Warrington	147	34	0	0	102
1976–80	St. Helens	133	36	0	0	108
1980–81	Fulham RLFC	18	4	0	0	12
	Total	298	74	0	0	222
Representative
Years	Team	Pld	T	G	FG	P
1973–74	Lancashire	5	5	0	0	15
1975	England	3	1	0	0	3

Derek Noonan (1 February 1947 – 1 May 2009) was an English rugby union and professional rugby league footballer who played in the 1970s and 1980s. He played club level rugby union (RU) for St Helens RUFC, as a wing, and representative level rugby league (RL) for England and Lancashire, and at club level for Warrington, St Helens and Fulham RLFC, as a centre.

== Background ==
Derek Noonan's birth was registered in St. Helens, Lancashire, England, and he died aged 62 in St. Helens, Merseyside.

== Playing career ==
=== Warrington ===
Noonan played at centre in Warrington's 24–9 victory over Featherstone Rovers in the 1974 Challenge Cup Final during the 1973–74 season at Wembley Stadium, London on Saturday 11 May 1974, in front of a crowd of 77,400, played at centre in the 7–14 defeat by Widnes in the 1975 Challenge Cup Final during the 1974–75 season at Wembley Stadium, London on Saturday 10 May 1975, in front of a crowd of 85,998.

Noonan played at centre (replaced by substitute Billy Pickup) and scored two tries in Warrington's 27–16 victory over Rochdale Hornets in the 1973–74 Player's No.6 Trophy Final during the 1973–74 season at Central Park, Wigan on Saturday 9 February 1974.

Noonan played at centre in Warrington's 4–0 victory over Featherstone Rovers in the 1973–74 Captain Morgan Trophy Final during the 1973–74 season at The Willows, Salford on Saturday 26 January 1974, in front of a crowd of 5,259.

Noonan played stand-off in Warrington's 0–0 draw with by Salford in the 1974 BBC2 Floodlit Trophy Final during the 1974–75 season at The Willows, Salford on Tuesday 17 December 1974, and played stand-off (replaced by substitute Wilf Briggs) in the 5–10 defeat by Salford in the 1974 BBC2 Floodlit Trophy Final replay during the 1974–75 season at Wilderspool Stadium, Warrington on Tuesday 28 January 1975.

=== St Helens ===
Noonan played at centre in St. Helens' 20–5 victory over Widnes in the 1976 Challenge Cup Final during the 1975–76 season at Wembley Stadium, London on Saturday 8 May 1976, in front of a crowd of 89,982.

Noonan played at centre in St. Helens' 2–25 defeat by the 1975 NSWRFL season premiers, Eastern Suburbs Roosters in the unofficial 1976 World Club Challenge at Sydney Cricket Ground on Tuesday 29 June 1976.

He played at centre in St. Helens' 11–26 defeat by Hull Kingston Rovers in the 1977 BBC2 Floodlit Trophy Final during the 1977–78 season at Hilton Park, Leigh on Tuesday 13 December 1977.

=== Representative honours ===
Derek Noonan won caps for England while at Warrington in 1975 against Wales, in the 1975 Rugby League World Cup against France, and Wales. He also played in a non-Test match against Papua New Guinea.

Derek Noonan won five caps for Lancashire while at Warrington.
