= Alan Whittle (rugby league) =

English rugby league footballer (born 1947)

Personal information
- Full name: Alan Whittle
- Born: 1 February 1947 (age 79) Billinge, St Helens

Playing information
- Position: Wing, Centre, Stand-off, Scrum-half
Club
Years	Team	Pld	T	G	FG	P
1963–72	St Helens	201	69	0	0	207
1972–73	Barrow	31	13	0	0	39
1973–75	Warrington	79	20	3	0	66
1975–76	Wigan	27	3	0	0	9
1977	Oldham RLFC	12	2	0	0	6
	Total	350	107	3	0	327
Representative
Years	Team	Pld	T	G	FG	P
1971–74	Lancashire	3+1	1	0	0	3

Alan Whittle (born 1 February 1947) is a former professional rugby league footballer who played in the 1960s and 1970s. He played at club level for St Helens, Barrow, Warrington, Wigan and Oldham RLFC, as a wing, centre, stand-off, or scrum-half.

== Playing career ==
=== Challenge Cup Final appearances ===
Whittle was an unused substitute in St. Helens' 16–13 victory over Leeds in the 1972 Challenge Cup Final during the 1971–72 season at Wembley Stadium, London on Saturday 13 May 1972, played at centre in Warrington's 24–9 victory over Featherstone Rovers in the 1974 Challenge Cup Final during the 1973–74 season at Wembley Stadium, London on Saturday 11 May 1974, in front of a crowd of 77,400 and played stand-off in the 7–14 defeat by Widnes in the 1975 Challenge Cup Final during the 1974–75 season at Wembley Stadium, London on Saturday 10 May 1975, in front of a crowd of 85,998.

=== County Cup Final appearances ===
Whittle played at centre in St. Helens' 2–2 draw with Warrington in the 1967 Lancashire Cup Final during the 1967–68 season at Station Road, Swinton on Saturday 7 October 1967 (he was replaced by Billy Benyon in the replay), played scrum-half in the 30–2 victory over Oldham in the 1968 Lancashire Cup Final during the 1968–69 season at Central Park, Wigan on Friday 25 October 1968, and played scrum-half in the 4–7 defeat by Leigh in the 1970 Lancashire Cup Final during the 1970–71 season at Station Road, Swinton on Saturday 28 November 1970.

=== BBC2 Floodlit Trophy Final appearances ===
Whittle played stand-off in St. Helens' 4–7 defeat by Wigan in the 1968 BBC2 Floodlit Trophy Final during the 1968-69 season at Central Park, Wigan on Tuesday 17 December 1968. played stand-off in the 5–9 defeat by Leeds in the 1970 BBC2 Floodlit Trophy Final during the 1970–71 season at Headingley, Leeds on Tuesday 15 December 1970, played at centre in Warrington's 0–0 draw with Salford in the 1974 BBC2 Floodlit Trophy Final during the 1974–75 season at The Willows, Salford on Tuesday 17 December 1974, and played centre in the 5–10 defeat by Salford in the 1974 BBC2 Floodlit Trophy Final replay during the 1974–75 season at Wilderspool Stadium, Warrington on Tuesday 28 January 1975.

=== Player's No.6 Trophy Final appearances ===
Whittle played stand-off in Warrington's 27–16 victory over Rochdale Hornets in the 1973–74 Player's No.6 Trophy Final during the 1973–74 season at Central Park, Wigan on Saturday 9 February 1974.

=== Captain Morgan Trophy Final appearances ===
Whittle played stand-off in Warrington's 4–0 victory over Featherstone Rovers in the 1973–74 Captain Morgan Trophy Final during the 1973–74 season at The Willows, Salford on Saturday 26 January 1974, in front of a crowd of 5,259.
