= Tom Brophy (rugby) =

England international rugby union & rugby league footballer

Personal information
- Full name: Thomas John Brophy
- Born: 8 July 1942 (age 83) Liverpool, England

Playing information

Rugby union
- Position: Fly-half
Club
Years	Team	Pld	T	G	FG	P
196?–66	Loughborough Colleges
	Liverpool
	Total	0	0	0	0	0
Representative
Years	Team	Pld	T	G	FG	P
1964–66	England	8				0

Rugby league
- Position: Centre
Club
Years	Team	Pld	T	G	FG	P
1966–72	Barrow
1972–74	Rochdale Hornets
1974	Salford	14				8
	Total	14	0	0	0	8
Representative
Years	Team	Pld	T	G	FG	P
1968	Lancashire	1	0	0	0	0

Tom Brophy is an English former rugby union international who represented England from 1964 to 1966. In 1966 he swapped codes to become a rugby league footballer for Barrow.

== Early life ==
Tom Brophy was born on 8 July 1942 in Liverpool. He studied chemistry at Loughborough College, where he played for Loughborough Colleges, the forerunner of the Loughborough Students Rugby Union Football Club. He became a chemistry teacher at Rossall School before his move into rugby league. In 1968 he had a daughter, named Sarah, who now works as head of English at Scarborough College.

== Rugby union career ==
Brophy made his international début on 8 February 1964 at Twickenham in the England vs Ireland match. Of the 8 matches he played for his national side he was on the winning side on just one occasion. He played his last match for England on 26 February 1966 at Colombes in the France vs England match.

Brophy's union career finished in 1966 when, on 3 October, he signed for Barrow. He had been due to appear in the first England RU trial at the end of the week.

== Rugby league career ==
Within a year of joining Barrow, Brophy was in the team that made it to the 1967 Challenge Cup Final. This had been the first appearance in a decade. They lost before a crowd of 76,290 to Featherstone Rovers 17-12 despite going into the game as favourites.

In 1972 he signed for Rochdale Hornets in an exchange deal that took Joe Chamberlain to the north Lancashire club. Here, Brophy did his best work in the centre, forming a good partnership with Norman Brelsford. Tom Brophy played right-centre in Rochdale Hornets' 16–27 defeat by Warrington in the 1973–74 Player's No.6 Trophy Final during the 1973–74 season at Central Park, Wigan on Saturday 9 February 1974.

Brophy joined Salford in 1974, making 14 appearances for the club. He played stand-off in Salford's 0–0 draw with Warrington in the 1974 BBC2 Floodlit Trophy Final during the 1974–75 season at The Willows, Salford on Tuesday 17 December 1974, but was replaced by Ken Gill in the 10–5 victory in the replay at Wilderspool Stadium, Warrington on Tuesday 28 January 1975.

== Post-rugby days ==
Upon its opening in the early 1980s, Brophy became headmaster of St Gregory's Catholic High School in Warrington, a position he would hold until his retirement in 2000. As of April 2017, he is the longest-running headmaster of the school so far.
