= Mike Nicholas =

Wales international rugby league & union footballer, President of Wales Rugby League

Mike Nicholas MBE
Personal information
- Full name: Michael James Nicholas
- Born: 30 July 1946 (age 79) Port Talbot, Wales

Playing information

Rugby union
Club
Years	Team	Pld	T	G	FG	P
1965–66	Aberavon RFC
1966–68	Aberavon Green Stars RFC
1968–72	Aberavon RFC
	Total	0	0	0	0	0

Rugby league
- Position: Prop, Back Row
Club
Years	Team	Pld	T	G	FG	P
1972–80	Warrington	142+10	14	8	0	58
1981–82	Cardiff City Blue Dragons	6	0	0	0	0
	Total	158	14	8	0	58
Representative
Years	Team	Pld	T	G	FG	P
1975–79	Wales	4+2	0	0	0

Michael Nicholas MBE (30 July 1946) is the President of Wales Rugby League. He is a Welsh former rugby union and professional rugby league footballer who played in the 1970s and 1980s, and has coached or been the team manager of the Wales Rugby League team since the 1980s. He played club level rugby union (RU) for Aberavon. In rugby league (RL) he played for Warrington, and the Cardiff Blue Dragons, and at representative Rugby League level for Wales and Great Britain. He played as a prop or second row forward.

== Playing career ==
=== Club career ===
Mike Nicholas was sent off 13-times for Warrington.

In the 1973–74 season, Nicholas played as a substitute (replacing Prop David Chisnall), and scored a try in Warrington's 27–16 victory over Rochdale Hornets in the 1973–74 Player's No.6 Trophy Final at Central Park, Wigan on Saturday 9 February 1974, and played left-second-row in Warrington's 24–9 victory over Featherstone Rovers in the 1974 Challenge Cup Final at Wembley Stadium, London on Saturday 11 May 1974, in front of a crowd of 77,400.

During the 1974–75 season, Nicholas did not play in Warrington's 0–0 draw with Salford in the 1974 BBC2 Floodlit Trophy Final, but did play in the replay, which Warrington lost 5–10 at Wilderspool Stadium, Warrington on Tuesday 28 January 1975. He played as a substitute (replacing right-second-row Thomas Martyn) in the 7–14 defeat by Widnes in the 1975 Challenge Cup Final at Wembley Stadium, London on Saturday 10 May 1975, in front of a crowd of 85,998.

Nicholas played right-prop, in the 9–4 victory over Widnes in the 1977–78 Players No.6 Trophy Final during the 1977–78 season at Knowsley Road, St. Helens on Saturday 28 January 1978, and played right-prop, in the 14–16 defeat by Widnes in the 1978–79 John Player Trophy Final during the 1978–79 season at Knowsley Road, St. Helens on Saturday 28 April 1979.

Nicholas played as a front-rower in Warrington's 15–12 victory over Australia at Wilderspool Stadium, Warrington on Wednesday 11 October 1978.

=== International honours ===
Nicholas won six caps for Wales while at Warrington. He played in 1975 against France and England, in 1977 against England and France, in 1978 against France, and in 1979 against England. He was also selected for Great Britain for the 1974 Lions tour, but was forced to withdraw due to injury.

== Coaching career ==
Mike Nicholas was team manager of Wales at the 2000 Rugby League World Cup.

== Honours ==
Nicholas was inducted into Warrington's Hall Of Fame in 2014.

Nicholas was appointed Member of the Order of the British Empire (MBE) in the 2020 New Year Honours for services to rugby league in Wales.
