= Parry Gordon =

England international rugby league footballer

- Parry Gordon (front) signing for Warrington in 1961

Personal information
- Full name: John Parry Gordon
- Born: 17 February 1945; Wigan, England
- Died: 3 November 2009 (aged 64); Warrington, England

Playing information
- Height: 5 ft 6 in (1.68 m)
- Weight: 11 st 8 lb (73 kg)
- Position: Scrum-half
Club
Years	Team	Pld	T	G	FG	P
1963–81	Warrington	543	167	1	0	503
Representative
Years	Team	Pld	T	G	FG	P
1966	Great Britain U24	1	0	0	0	0
1969–74	Lancashire	7	1	0	0	3

John Parry Gordon (17 February 1945 – 3 November 2009) was an English professional rugby league footballer who played in the 1960s, 1970s and 1980s. He played at representative level for Great Britain under-24's and Lancashire, and at club level for Warrington, as a scrum-half.

== Background ==
Gordon was born in Wigan, Lancashire, and was educated at Highfield School. He died in 2009, aged 64, in Warrington, Cheshire.

== Club career ==
Gordon signed for Warrington on his 16th birthday for a fee of £400, and he made his début for Warrington on 26 October 1963.

During the 1967–68 season, Gordon played at scrum-half in Warrington's 2–2 draw with St Helens in the 1967 Lancashire Cup Final at Central Park, Wigan on 7 October 1967. He scored a try in the replay at Station Road, Swinton on 2 December 1967, but Warrington ultimately suffered a 10–13 defeat.

Gordon played a key role in the club's successful 1973–74 campaign, helping the club win four trophies during the season; he played in Warrington's 4–0 victory over Featherstone Rovers in the Captain Morgan Trophy Final at The Willows, Salford on 26 January 1974, the 27–16 victory over Rochdale Hornets in the 1973–74 Player's No.6 Trophy Final at Central Park, Wigan on 9 February 1974, the 24–9 victory over Featherstone Rovers in the 1974 Challenge Cup Final at Wembley Stadium, London on 11 May 1974, and the 13–12 victory over St Helens in the Premiership Final during the 1973–74 season at Central Park, Wigan on Saturday 18 May 1974.

During the 1974–75 season, Gordon played scrum-half in Warrington's 0–0 draw with Salford in the 1974 BBC2 Floodlit Trophy Final at The Willows, Salford on 17 December 1974, and played scrum-half in the 5–10 defeat by Salford in the replay at Wilderspool Stadium, Warrington on 28 January 1975. He also returned to Wembley in the 1975 Challenge Cup on 10 May 1975, but was this time on the losing side in a 7–14 defeat by Widnes .

Gordon played scrum-half in the 9–4 victory over Widnes in the 1977–78 Players No.6 Trophy Final during the 1977–78 season at Knowsley Road, St. Helens on Saturday 28 January 1978, and played scrum-half in the 14–16 defeat by Widnes in the 1978–79 John Player Trophy Final during the 1977–78 season at Knowsley Road, St. Helens on Saturday 28 April 1979.

Gordon's testimonial match at Warrington took place in 1981. He played his last match for Warrington on Sunday 13 September 1981. With 543 appearances, Parry Gordon is second in Warrington's 'Most Appearances In A Career' list behind Brian Bevan, who had 620 appearances, and ahead of Jack 'Cod' Miller, who had 526 appearances.

== Representative career ==
Gordon won seven caps for Lancashire while at Warrington, and played for the Great Britain under-24 team.

Gordon was selected in the England squad for the 1975 Rugby League World Cup, but he did not participate in any of the nine matches. He appeared as a substitute in a game against Papua New Guinea, but the match is not recognised as a full international. He never played for the senior Great Britain team during his career, and is often regarded as one of the best scrum halves never to have been capped at international level.

== Honoured at Warrington Wolves ==
Gordon is a Warrington Wolves Hall of Fame inductee.
