= Captain Morgan Trophy =

Rugby league trophy

The Captain Morgan Trophy was a knock-out trophy introduced by the Rugby League for season 1973–74. It was scrapped after only one season.

== Background ==
The Captain Morgan Trophy was a knock-out trophy introduced by the Rugby League supposedly intended to fill an "Imaginary" void in the season's fixture list.
The competition was introduced for the season 1973–1974, but failed to catch the imagination of the public, or the clubs themselves and only took place for the one single season.
The competition was sponsored by the House of Seagram, makers at that time of Captain Morgan Rum. (Note – This product is now produced by Diageo plc.),

The Captain Morgan Trophy competition had slightly different qualification and draw rules, as follows :-
1) Qualification for the competition was open to:-
a) the eight winners of the first round of the Yorkshire County cup
b) The seven winners of the first round of the Lancashire county cup and because there were only fifteen teams in the Lancashire competition, the Lancashire team losing in the first round by the smallest margin.
c) The idea of this arrangement was to eliminate some of the "lesser" or "poorer" teams from the competition, thus reducing the number of games which are very one sided. This objective was somewhat defeated after teams like St. Helens, Hull F.C. and Hull Kingston Rovers failed to gain entry.
2) In addition to this, for the first round the draw kept the Yorkshire sides apart from those on the West of the Pennines (i.e. those in Lancashire and Cumberland)
3) The two sets of teams were all brought together for the subsequent rounds.

The first and only final was held at The Willows in Salford, on 26 January 1974. Warrington defeated Featherstone Rovers 4–0 in front of a disappointing crowd of only 5,269.
The "Man of the Match" award was won by Derek Whitehead.
The Warrington team was Derek Whitehead, Mick Philbin, Derek Noonan, Frank Reynolds, John Bevan, Alan Whittle, Parry Gordon, Dave Chisnall, Kevin Ashcroft, Brian Brady, Bobby Wanbon, David Wright, Ian Mather, with substitutes Billy Pickup (not used) and Joe Price. (Alex Murphy was injured)
The Featherstone Rovers team included Harold Box and John "Keith" Bridges.

== Competition and results ==
=== Round 1 ===
Game No	Fixture Date	Home team	Score	Away team	Venue	H-T	Att	Notes	Ref
1	24-10-1973	Wakefield Trinity	24–5	Batley	Belle Vue	8–0	2010		
2	27-10-1973	Bradford Northern	6–14	Leeds	Odsal	6–8	5028		
3	28-10-1973	Featherstone Rovers	27–8	Keighley	Post Office Rd	9–2	1948		
4	28-10-1973	Swinton	18–7	Whitehaven	Station Road	13–2	1298		
5	28-10-1973	Workington Town	22–13	Rochdale Hornets	Derwent Park	12–8	1135		
6	31-10-1973	Wigan	4–12	Warrington	Central Park	2–6	8577	(Note: Wigan scorer – John Gray 2 goals) (Note: Warrington scores – Derek Whitehead 5 goals; Alex Murphy 1 dg; a n other 1 dg)	
7	06-11-1973	Salford	32–9	Widnes	The Willows	20–4	1709	(Note: Widnes scorers – Barry Sheridan 1 try, Ray Dutton 3 goals) (Note: Widnes entered the competition as the loser by the smallest margin in the Lancashire Cup first round (after losing away at Salford by 12 points to 11))	
8	07-11-1973	Castleford	32–7	Huddersfield	Wheldon Road	9–5	886		

=== Round 2 ===
Game No	Fixture Date	Home team	Score	Away team	Venue	H-T	Att	Notes	Ref
1	17-11-1973	Leeds	32–21	Swinton	Headingley	17–4	3416		
2	18-11-1973	Warrington	15–7	Castleford	Wilderspool	10–2	5246	(Note: Warrington scores – Tommy Conroy, Brian Brady and Dave Cunliffe each scored a try, Derek Whitehead 3 goals)	
3	18-11-1973	Workington Town	10–5	Salford	Derwent Park	10–3	1703		
4	25-11-1973	Featherstone Rovers	20–14	Wakefield Trinity	Post Office Rd	12–7	4000		

=== Round 3 – Semi Finals ===
Game No	Fixture Date	Home team	Score	Away team	Venue	H-T	Att	Notes	Ref
1	08-12-1973	Leeds	13–20	Warrington	Headingley	11–7	4053	(Note: Warrington scores – Kevin Ashcroft and Parry Gordon each scored a try, Derek Whitehead 5 goals, Kevin Ashcroft and Alex Murphy each 1 dg)	
2	09-12-1973	Featherstone Rovers	37–18	Workington Town	Post Office Rd	12–5	3000		

=== Round 4 – Final ===
Game No	Fixture Date	Home team	Score	Away team	Venue	H-T	Att	Notes	Ref
1	26 January 1974	Warrington	4–0	Featherstone Rovers	The Willows, Salford	4–0	5259	(Note: Warrington scores – Derek Whitehead 2 goals) (Note: Derek Whitehead was presented with an 80oz magnum bottle of Captain Morgan Rum as winner of the man of the match award.)	

== See also ==
- British rugby league system
- 1973–74 Northern Rugby Football League season
- Cumberland League
- Rugby league county cups
- List of defunct rugby league clubs
