= John Bevan (rugby) =

Former RU coach and former GB & Wales dual-code rugby international footballer

- Born: John Charles Bevan; 28 October 1950 (age 76) Tylorstown, Rhondda, Wales
- Height: 6 ft 0 in (1.83 m)
- Weight: 13 st 9 lb (87 kg)
- School: Ferndale Grammar
- University: Cardiff College of Education
- Occupation: Teacher

Rugby union career
- Position: Three-quarters
Senior career
Years	Team	Apps	(Points)
–	Tylorstown RFC		
–	Cardiff RFC		
–	Barbarian F.C.		
International career
Years	Team	Apps	(Points)
1971-73	Wales	10	(19)
1971	British Lions	14	(18)
Coaching career
- Years: Team
- 1997-98: Munster
- Rugby league career

Playing information
- Position: Back, Second-row
Club
Years	Team	Pld	T	G	FG	P
1973–86	Warrington	332				628
1978	Lancashire	1				3
	Total	333	0	0	0	631
Representative
Years	Team	Pld	T	G	FG	P
1975–82	Wales
1974–78	Great Britain	6				15
1974	GB tour games	13				36
1974	Other Nationalities	1				0

John Charles Bevan (born 28 October 1950) is a Welsh international rugby footballer who played in the 1970s and 1980s. He is one of two John Bevans who played for Wales during the 1970s.

== Rugby career ==
His début for Wales came on 16 January 1971 during the Five Nations Championship when Wales played England. He crowned the win with a try as Wales ran out 22–6 winners. He played in all of the other games in the tournament, but did not score again, as Wales went on to win the championship and the Grand Slam.

Starting his career in rugby union, he played for the Cardiff club and after being capped for Wales in 1971, Bevan toured Australia and New Zealand with the British Lions. He played in 14 matches including the first test and scored a total of 18 tries. The 17 scored in New Zealand equalled the record of Tony O'Reilly. He was a speedy wing (number 11) from Tylorstown South Wales and was also immensely strong. His powerful bullocking running style was all the more appropriate as he shared the initials JCB with a renowned British manufacturer of bulldozers. He is chiefly remembered for his role in the Barbarians' victory over New Zealand in 1973, during which he scored a try. During his short international career Bevan scored 5 tries for Wales.

In September 1973, Bevan switched to rugby league, and joined Warrington for the then massive signing on fee of £12,000 (based on increases in average earnings, this would be approximately £200,000 in 2015). He made 332 appearances for the Warrington club in which he scored 201 tries usually on the wing. He played for Wales and Great Britain. John earned the nickname "The Ox", after 13 seasons, Bevan retired from the professional game. John Bevan's Testimonial match at Warrington took place in 1983.

=== International honours ===
John Bevan won 17-caps for Wales (RL) while at Warrington 1975...1982, scoring 5-tries in total for 15-points, and won 6-caps for Great Britain (RL) while at Warrington on the 1974 Great Britain Lions tour against Australia (two matches), and New Zealand (two matches), and in 1978 against Australia (two matches), scoring 5-tries in total for 15-points.

=== Challenge Cup Final appearances ===
John Bevan played left wing in Warrington's 24–9 victory over Featherstone Rovers in the 1974 Challenge Cup Final during the 1973–74 season at Wembley Stadium, London on Saturday 11 May 1974, in front of a crowd of 77,400, and played left wing, and scored a try in the 7–14 defeat by Widnes in the 1975 Challenge Cup Final during the 1974–75 season at Wembley Stadium, London on Saturday 10 May 1975, in front of a crowd of 85,998.

=== County Cup Final appearances ===
John Bevan played left-centre and scored a try in Warrington's 26–10 victory over Wigan in the 1980 Lancashire Cup Final during the 1980–81 season at Knowsley Road, St. Helens, on Saturday 4 October 1980, played left-centre in the 16–0 victory over St. Helens in the 1982 Lancashire Cup Final during the 1982–83 season at Central Park, Wigan on Saturday 23 October 1982.

=== BBC2 Floodlit Trophy Final appearances ===
John Bevan played left wing in Warrington's 0–0 draw with Salford in the 1974 BBC2 Floodlit Trophy Final during the 1974–75 season at The Willows, Salford on Tuesday 17 December 1974, and played left wing, and scored a try in the 5–10 defeat by Salford in the 1974 BBC2 Floodlit Trophy Final replay during the 1974–75 season at Wilderspool Stadium, Warrington on Tuesday 28 January 1975.

=== Player's No.6/John Player Trophy Final appearances ===
John Bevan played left wing and scored a try in Warrington's 27–16 victory over Rochdale Hornets in the 1973–74 Player's No.6 Trophy Final during the 1973–74 season at Central Park, Wigan on Saturday 9 February 1974, played left wing, and scored a try in the 9–4 victory over Widnes in the 1977–78 John Player Trophy Final during the 1977–78 season at Knowsley Road, St. Helens on Saturday 28 January 1978, and played left-centre and scored 2-tries in the 12–5 victory over Barrow in the 1980–81 John Player Trophy Final during the 1977–78 season at Knowsley Road, St. Helens on Saturday 24 January 1981.

=== Captain Morgan Trophy Final appearances ===
John Bevan played left wing in Warrington's 4–0 victory over Featherstone Rovers in the 1973–74 Captain Morgan Trophy Final during the 1973–74 season at The Willows, Salford on Saturday 26 January 1974, in front of a crowd of 5,259.

=== Coaching ===
Bevan was appointed head coach of Irish province Munster for the 1997–98 season only.

== Career records ==
John Bevan is one of fewer than twenty Welshmen to have scored more than 200-tries in their rugby league career.

== Personal history ==
He has taught at many schools including: Ferndale Boys School, Culcheth High School, English Martyrs School and Arnold School in Blackpool.

In September 2000, after having stepped down as Director of Coaching for the Welsh Rugby Union, John Bevan joined the teaching staff at Monmouth School as a teacher of Religious Education and Director of Rugby Coaching. He currently coaches teams throughout the school, including the 1st XV. His catchphrase of "my granny could do better than that" meaning anything from tackle, to run, is perhaps the main reason for Monmouth's record of 123 games unbeaten. He remains a rugby legend and an inspiration to the boys.

== Honoured at Warrington Wolves ==
John Bevan is a Warrington Wolves Hall of Fame inductee.
