= Kevin Ashcroft =

English rugby league footballer (1944–2026)

Personal information
- Born: 5 June 1944 Newton-le-Willows, England
- Died: 2 March 2026 (aged 81)

Playing information
- Position: Hooker
Club
Years	Team	Pld	T	G	FG	P
1964	Dewsbury	5	1	0	0	3
1964–1967	Rochdale	82	2	0	0	6
1967–1972	Leigh	198+5	19	12	0	81
1972–1975	Warrington	123+1	20	0	23	101
1975–1977	Leigh	58	6	0	6	24
1978–1981	Salford	55+5	4	0	4	16
	Total	532	52	12	33	231
Representative
Years	Team	Pld	T	G	FG	P
1969–1974	Lancashire	4	1	0	0	3
1968–1974	Great Britain	5+1	1	0	0	3
1968–1974	GB tour games	15	3	0	0	9
1965	GB Under 24	1	0	0	0	0

Coaching information
Club
Years	Team	Gms	W	D	L	W%
1975–1977	Leigh	59	37	2	20	63
1980–1982	Salford	48	24	1	23	50
1982–1984	Warrington	90	50	5	35	56
1984–1989	Salford	175	85	3	87	49
1991–1992	Leigh	33	22	0	11	67
2005	Blackpool Panthers	0	0	0	0
	Total	405	218	11	176	54

Kevin Ashcroft (5 June 1944 – 2 March 2026) was an English professional rugby league footballer who played in the 1960s and 1970s, and coached in the 1970s, 1980s and 1990s. He played at representative level for Great Britain and Lancashire, and at club level for the Rochdale Hornets, Dewsbury, Leigh, Warrington and Salford, as a hooker. He coached at club level for Leigh (two spells) and Salford. Ashcroft is a Warrington Hall of Fame inductee.

== Playing career ==
=== Rochdale Hornets ===
Ashcroft played hooker in Rochdale Hornets' 5-16 defeat by Warrington in the 1965 Lancashire Cup Final during the 1965–66 season at Knowsley Road, St. Helens on Friday 29 October 1965.

=== Leigh ===
Ashcroft played prop in Leigh's 5-8 defeat by Castleford in the 1967 BBC2 Floodlit Trophy Final during the 1967–68 season at Headingley, Leeds on Saturday 16 January 1968, played prop in the 11-6 victory over Wigan in the 1969 BBC2 Floodlit Trophy Final during the 1969–70 season at Central Park, Wigan on Tuesday 16 December 1969.

He played hooker in Leigh's 2-11 defeat by Swinton in the 1969 Lancashire Cup Final during the 1969–70 season at Central Park, Wigan on Saturday 1 November 1969, and played hooker in the 7-4 victory over St. Helens in the 1970 Lancashire Cup Final during the 1970–71 season at Station Road, Swinton on Saturday 28 November 1970.

Ashcroft played hooker in Leigh's 24-7 victory over Leeds in the 1971 Challenge Cup Final during the 1970–71 season at Wembley Stadium, London on Saturday 15 May 1971, in front of a crowd of 85,514.

=== Warrington ===
Ashcroft played hooker in Warrington's 24-9 victory over Featherstone Rovers in the 1974 Challenge Cup Final during the 1973–74 season at Wembley Stadium, London on Saturday 11 May 1974, in front of a crowd of 77,400, and played hooker in the 7-14 defeat by Widnes in the 1975 Challenge Cup Final during the 1974–75 season at Wembley Stadium, London on Saturday 10 May 1975, in front of a crowd of 85,998.

He played prop in Warrington's 0-0 draw with by Salford in the 1974 BBC2 Floodlit Trophy Final during the 1974–75 season at The Willows, Salford on Tuesday 17 December 1974, played prop in the 5-10 defeat by Salford in the 1974 BBC2 Floodlit Trophy Final replay during the 1974–75 season at Wilderspool Stadium, Warrington on Tuesday 28 January 1975.

Ashcroft played hooker, was captain, and was man of the match in Warrington's 27-16 victory over Rochdale Hornets in the 1973–74 Player's No.6 Trophy Final during the 1973–74 season at Central Park, Wigan on Saturday 9 February 1974, Ashcroft gave his £25 man of the match prize to Wigan's groundsman Billy Mitchell who had managed to get the water-logged pitch into a playable condition, (based on increases in average earnings, this would be approximately £499.40 in 2024).

He played hooker in Warrington's 4-0 victory over Featherstone Rovers in the 1973–74 Captain Morgan Trophy Final during the 1973–74 season at The Willows, Salford on Saturday 26 January 1974, in front of a crowd of 5,259.

=== Return to Leigh ===
Ashcroft played prop, was the coach, and scored a drop goal in Leigh's 4-12 defeat by Castleford in the 1976 BBC2 Floodlit Trophy Final during the 1976–77 season at Hilton Park, Leigh on Tuesday 14 December 1976.

=== International honours ===
On 3 April 1965, Ashcroft played in the first ever Great Britain under-24 international match in a 17–9 win against France under-24's.

Ashcroft won caps for Great Britain while at Leigh in the 1968 Rugby League World Cup against Australia, in 1968 against France, in 1969 against France, in the 1970 Rugby League World Cup against France, and New Zealand, and on the 1974 Great Britain Lions tour against New Zealand (interchange/substitute).

== Coaching career ==
=== County Cup Final appearances ===
Ashcroft was the coach in Warrington's 16–0 victory over St. Helens in the 1982 Lancashire Cup Final during the 1982–83 season at Central Park, Wigan on Saturday 23 October 1982, and the coach in Salford's 17–22 defeat by Wigan in the 1988 Lancashire Cup Final during the 1988–89 season at Knowsley Road, St. Helens on Sunday 23 October 1988.

== Death ==
Ashcroft died on 2 March 2026, at the age of 81.
