= Barry Philbin =

England international rugby league footballer (born 1950)

Personal information
- Born: 14 July 1950 (age 76) St Helens, Lancashire

Playing information
- Position: Loose forward
Club
Years	Team	Pld	T	G	FG	P
1967–68	Blackpool Borough	5	1	0	0	3
1970–73	Swinton	86	14	0	0	42
1974–78	Warrington	91	14	0	2	45
1978–79	Salford	11	1	0	0	3
	Total	193	30	0	2	93
Representative
Years	Team	Pld	T	G	FG	P
1975	England	1	0	0	0	0
1974	Lancashire	3	0	0	0	0

Barry Philbin (born 14 July 1950) is an English former professional rugby league footballer who played in the 1970s. He played at representative level for England, and at club level for Swinton and Warrington, as a loose forward. He subsequently broke his leg, which he puts down to playing in jersey number unlucky 13.

== Playing career ==
=== Club career ===
Philbin signed for Swinton in April 1970 from junior club Blackbrook.

Philbin made his début for Warrington on Sunday 3 February 1974, and he played his last match for Warrington on Wednesday 12 April 1978.

Philbin played, and was man of the match winning the Harry Sunderland Trophy in Warrington's 13-12 victory over St. Helens in the Championship Final (a one-off precursor Premiership) during the 1973–74 season at Central Park, Wigan on Saturday 18 May 1974.

Philbin played loose forward in Warrington's 24-9 victory over Featherstone Rovers in the 1974 Challenge Cup Final during the 1973–74 season at Wembley Stadium, London on Saturday 11 May 1974, in front of a crowd of 77,400, and played loose forward in the 7-14 defeat by Widnes in the 1975 Challenge Cup Final during the 1974–75 season at Wembley Stadium, London on Saturday 10 May 1975, in front of a crowd of 85,998.

Philbin played loose forward in Warrington's 0-0 draw with Salford in the 1974 BBC2 Floodlit Trophy Final during the 1974–75 season at The Willows, Salford on Tuesday 17 December 1974, and played loose forward in the 5-10 defeat by Salford in the 1974 BBC2 Floodlit Trophy Final replay during the 1974–75 season at Wilderspool Stadium, Warrington on Tuesday 28 January 1975.

Philbin played loose forward in Warrington's 27-16 victory over Rochdale Hornets in the 1973–74 Player's No.6 Trophy Final during the 1973–74 season at Central Park, Wigan on Saturday 9 February 1974, and played at second-row in the 9-4 victory over Widnes in the 1977–78 Players No.6 Trophy Final during the 1977–78 season at Knowsley Road, St. Helens on Saturday 28 January 1978.

=== International honours ===
Philbin won a cap for England while at Warrington in the 1975 Rugby League World Cup against France.
