= Dave Chisnall (rugby league) =

Great Britain and England international rugby league footballer (1948–2013)

- Chisnall in 1974

Personal information
- Full name: David Chisnall
- Born: 10 April 1948 St. Helens, England
- Died: 11 January 2013 (aged 64) St. Helens, England

Playing information
- Position: Prop
Club
Years	Team	Pld	T	G	FG	P
1967–71	Leigh	138+2	26	0	0	78
1971–75	Warrington	137+3	24	0	0	72
1975–76	Swinton	24	0	0	0	0
1976–77	Leigh	25+1	2	0	0	6
1977–79	St. Helens	114+5	12	0	0	36
1980–81	Barrow	38+1	2	0	0	6
1981–84	Warrington	57+13	5	0	0	15
1984–85	Rochdale	6+4	0	0	0	15
1984–85	Mansfield	6+4	0	0	0	15
	Total	578	71	0	0	243
Representative
Years	Team	Pld	T	G	FG	P
1975	England	4	0	0	0	0
1970	Great Britain	2	0	0	0	0
1970–74	Lancashire	6	1	0	0	3

Coaching information
Club
Years	Team	Gms	W	D	L	W%
1989–90	Runcorn Highfield	0	0	0	0
- Relatives: Eric Chisnall (brother)

David Chisnall (10 April 1948 – 11 January 2013) was an English professional rugby league footballer who played in the 1970s and 1980s. He played at representative level for Great Britain and England, and at club level for Leigh (two spells), Warrington (two spells) (captain), Swinton, St. Helens and Barrow, as a prop.

== Background ==
Chisnall was born in St. Helens, England – when it was part of Lancashire county – in 1948. He is the younger brother of rugby league footballers Les and Eric Chisnall. All three Chisnalls played for Leigh at times during their careers, with Dave and Les playing there together for at least one season. Chisnall died aged 64 in St Helens.

== Playing career ==
=== Leigh ===
Chisnall played at prop, in Leigh's 2–11 defeat by Swinton in the 1969 Lancashire Cup Final during the 1969–70 season at Central Park, Wigan on Saturday 1 November 1969, and played at prop in the 7–4 victory over St. Helens in the 1970 Lancashire Cup Final during the 1970–71 season at Station Road, Swinton on Saturday 28 November 1970.

Chisnall played at prop in Leigh's 11–6 victory over Wigan in the 1969 BBC2 Floodlit Trophy Final during the 1969–70 season at Central Park, Wigan on Tuesday 16 December 1969.

He missed out on Leigh's victory in the 1971 Challenge Cup final due to suspension.

In his second spell with Leigh, he played at prop in Leigh's 4–12 defeat by Castleford in the 1976 BBC2 Floodlit Trophy Final during the 1976–77 season at Hilton Park, Leigh on Tuesday 14 December 1976.

=== Warrington ===
Chisnall joined Warrington for a club record fee of £8,000, making his début for the club on 20 August 1971. He played at prop in Warrington's 24–9 victory over Featherstone Rovers in the 1974 Challenge Cup Final during the 1973–74 season at Wembley Stadium, London on Saturday 11 May 1974, in front of a crowd of 77,400, and played at prop, and was captain in the 7–14 defeat by Widnes in the 1975 Challenge Cup Final during the 1974–75 season at Wembley Stadium, London on Saturday 10 May 1975, in front of a crowd of 85,998.

He played at prop in Warrington's 0–0 draw with Salford in the 1974 BBC2 Floodlit Trophy Final during the 1974–75 season at The Willows, Salford on Tuesday 17 December 1974, and played at prop in the 5–10 defeat by Salford in the 1974 BBC2 Floodlit Trophy Final replay during the 1974–75 season at Wilderspool Stadium, Warrington on Tuesday 28 January 1975,

Chisnall played at prop in Warrington's 4–0 victory over Featherstone Rovers in the 1973–74 Captain Morgan Trophy Final during the 1973–74 season at The Willows, Salford on Saturday 26 January 1974, in front of a crowd of 5,259.

Chisnall played at prop in Warrington's 27–16 victory over Rochdale Hornets in the 1973–74 Player's No.6 Trophy Final during the 1973–74 season at Central Park, Wigan on Saturday 9 February 1974.

He was transferred from Warrington to Swinton in exchange for Brian Butler.

=== St Helens ===
After a short spell with Swinton and a brief return to Leigh, Chisnall joined St Helens in January 1977. He played at prop in St Helens' 11–26 defeat by Hull Kingston Rovers in the 1977 BBC2 Floodlit Trophy Final during the 1977–78 season at Craven Park, Hull on Tuesday 13 December 1977, and played at prop, and scored a try in the 7–13 defeat by Widnes in the 1978 BBC2 Floodlit Trophy Final during the 1978–79 season at Knowsley Road, St. Helens on Tuesday 12 December 1978.

=== Later career ===
He played at prop in Barrow's 5–12 defeat by Warrington in the 1980–81 John Player Trophy Final during the 1980–81 season at Central Park, Wigan on Saturday 24 January 1981.

He returned for a second spell with Warrington, appearing as a substitute, (replacing prop Tony Cooke) in the club's 16–0 victory over St Helens in the 1982 Lancashire Cup Final during the 1982–83 season at Central Park, Wigan on Saturday 23 October 1982. He played his last match for Warrington (in his second spell) on Monday 23 April 1984.

=== International honours ===
Chisnall won caps for England while at Warrington in 1975 against Wales (interchange/substitute), in the 1975 Rugby League World Cup against France, Wales, and New Zealand, in 1975 against Papua New Guinea (non-test), and won caps for Great Britain while at Leigh in 1970 against Australia, and in the 1970 Rugby League World Cup against New Zealand.

== Honoured at Warrington Wolves ==
Chisnall is a Warrington Wolves Hall of Fame inductee.
