= 1973–74 Player's No.6 Trophy =

- Structure: National knockout championship
- Teams: 32
- Winners: Warrington
- Runners-up: Rochdale Hornets

This was the third season of rugby league's League Cup competition, which for sponsorship reasons was known as the Players No.6 Trophy.

Warrington won the final, beating Rochdale Hornets by the score of 27–16 in the match played at Central Park, Wigan. The attendance was 9,347 and receipts were £4380.

== Background ==
This season saw no changes in the entrants, no new members and no withdrawals, the number remaining at thirty-two.

== Competition and results ==
=== Round 1 - First Round ===
Involved 16 matches and 32 Clubs

Game No	Fixture Date	Home team	Score	Away team	Venue	Att	Rec	Notes	Ref
1	Sat 15 Sep 1973	Bramley	20-12	Hull F.C.	McLaren Field	750			
2	Sat 15 Sep 1973	Keighley	30-10	Huyton	Lawkholme Lane	595		1	
3	Sat 15 Sep 1973	St. Helens	34-16	Featherstone Rovers	Knowsley Road	3000		2	
4	Sat 15 Sep 1973	Whitehaven	26-3	Dewsbury Celtic	Recreation Ground	1276		3, 4	
5	Sat 15 Sep 1973	Wigan	34-0	Batley	Central Park	4149			
6	Sun 16 Sep 1973	Bradford Northern	12-34	Leeds	Odsal	9028			
7	Sun 16 Sep 1973	Castleford	88-5	Millom	Wheldon Road	1031		5, 6	
8	Sun 16 Sep 1973	Dewsbury	33-24	Widnes	Crown Flatt	2508		7	
9	Sun 16 Sep 1973	Halifax	20-5	Barrow	Thrum Hall	1281		8	
10	Sun 16 Sep 1973	New Hunslet	11-26	Leigh	Elland Road Greyhound Stadium	2000			
11	Sun 16 Sep 1973	Rochdale Hornets	18-2	Huddersfield	Athletic Grounds	1952			
12	Sun 16 Sep 1973	Salford	47-17	Doncaster	The Willows	4122			
13	Sun 16 Sep 1973	Wakefield Trinity	47-13	Blackpool Borough	Belle Vue	2462			
14	Sun 16 Sep 1973	Warrington	31-14	Oldham	Wilderspool	5238			
15	Sun 16 Sep 1973	Workington Town	20-9	Hull Kingston Rovers	Derwent Park	1503			
16	Sun 16 Sep 1973	York	32-13	Swinton	Clarence Street	2509			

=== Round 2 - Second Round ===
Involved 8 matches and 16 Clubs
NOTE - Matches in this round kicked off earlier to make maximum use of the daylight
Use of Floodlights in sporting events was banned by government order from 15 November 1973 due to mining strikes

Game No	Fixture Date	Home team	Score	Away team	Venue	Att	Rec	Notes	Ref
1	Sat 15 Dec 1973	Bramley	24-12	Leigh	McLaren Field	750		9	
2	Sat 15 Dec 1973	Warrington	18-9	Castleford	Wilderspool	2208		9	
3	Sun 16 Dec 1973	Halifax	7-16	Dewsbury	Thrum Hall	2050		9	
4	Sun 16 Dec 1973	Rochdale Hornets	11-0	York	Athletic Grounds	2274		9	
5	Sun 16 Dec 1973	St. Helens	28-2	Whitehaven	Knowsley Road	2310		9, 10	
6	Sun 16 Dec 1973	Salford	4-17	Leeds	The Willows	821		9	
7	Sun 16 Dec 1973	Wakefield Trinity	10-7	Workington Town	Belle Vue	1835		9	
8	Sun 16 Dec 1973	Wigan	10-14	Keighley	Central Park	2509		9, 11	

=== Round 3 -Quarter Finals ===
Involved 4 matches with 8 clubs

Game No	Fixture Date	Home team	Score	Away team	Venue	Att	Rec	Notes	Ref
1	Sat 29 Dec 1973	Wakefield Trinity	18-18	St. Helens	Belle Vue	2890		12	
2	Sun 30 Dec 1973	Keighley	8-11	Bramley	Lawkholme Lane	2887		13	
3	Sun 30 Dec 1973	Rochdale Hornets	7-5	Leeds	Athletic Grounds	5389		13	
4	Sun 30 Dec 1973	Warrington	20-12	Dewsbury	Wilderspool	6090		13	

=== Round 3 -Quarter Finals - Replays ===
Involved 1 match with 2 clubs

Game No	Fixture Date	Home team	Score	Away team	Venue	Att	Rec	Notes	Ref
1	Sun 6 Jan 1974	St. Helens	16-10	Wakefield Trinity	Knowsley Road	7287			

=== Round 4 – Semi-Finals ===
Involved 2 matches and 4 Clubs

Game No	Fixture Date	Home team	Score	Away team	Venue	Att	Rec	Notes	Ref
1	Sun 6 Jan 1974	Rochdale Hornets	14-2	Bramley	Athletic Grounds	2835		14	
2	Sat 12 Jan 1974	Warrington	20-9	St. Helens	Wilderspool	5352			

=== Final ===
Game No	Fixture Date	Home team	Score	Away team	Venue	Att	Rec	Notes	Ref
	Saturday 9 February 1974	Warrington	27-16	Rochdale Hornets	Central Park	9347	4380	15, 16	

==== Teams and Scorers John Player yearbook 1974–75 ====
Warrington	№	Rochdale Hornets
	teams	
Derek Whitehead	1	James "Jim"/"Jimmy" Crellin
Michael "Mick"/"Mike" Philbin	2	Norman Brelsford
Derek Noonan	3	Tom Brophy
Frank Reynolds	4	David Taylor
John Bevan	5	Willie Aspinall
Alan Whittle	6	John Butler
Parry Gordon	7	Stephen/Steven "Steve" Gartland
David "Dave" Chisnall	8	William "Bill" Holliday
Kevin Ashcroft (c)	9	R. Harris
Brian Brady	10	S. Whitehead
David "Dave" Wright	11	Terry Fogerty
Robert "Bobby" Wanbon	12	William "Bill"/"Billy" Sheffield
Barry Philbin	13	Tony Halmshaw
William "Bill"/"Billy" Pickup (for Derek Noonan or Frank Reynolds)	14	Harry Wood (for John Butler or Terry Foggerty)
Mike Nicholas (for Dave Chisnall 19-mins)	15	? Not used
	Coach	Henry Delooze
27	score	16
12	HT	0
	Scorers	
	Tries	
Derek Whitehead (1)	T	Norman Brelsford (2)
Derek Noonan (2)	T	Tom Brophy (1)
John Bevan (1)	T	David Taylor (1)
Mike Nicholas (1)	T	
	Goals	
Derek Whitehead (6)	G	William "Bill" Holliday (2)
Referee		D. Gerald "Gerry" Kershaw (York)
Man of the match		Kevin Ashcroft - Warrington - Hooker
Competition Sponsor		Player's №6

Scoring - Try = three points - Goal = two points - Drop goal = one point

==== Timeline in the final ====
Time	Incident	Score
?	Penalty Goal: Derek Whitehead	2-0
27 min	Try: Mike Nicholas	5-0
	Conversion: Derek Whitehead	7-0
39 min	Try: Derek Noonan	10-0
	Conversion: Derek Whitehead	12-0
Half Time		12-0
	Penalty Goal: Colin Whitfield	12-0
43 min	Try: Norman Brelsford	15-3
?	Try: Derek Noonan	15-3
	Conversion: Derek Whitehead	17-3
?	Try: David Taylor	17-6
	Conversion: Bill Holliday	17-8
approx 50 min	Try: John Bevan	20-8
	Conversion: Derek Whitehead	22-8
approx 60 min	Try: Derek Whitehead	25-8
	Conversion: Derek Whitehead	27-8
?	Try: Norman Brelsford	27-11
	Conversion: Bill Holliday	27-13
79 min	Try: Tom Brophy	27-16
Full Time		27-16

=== Prize money ===
As part of the sponsorship deal and funds, the prize money awarded to the competing teams for this season was as follows:

Finish Position	Cash prize	No. receiving prize	Total cash
Winner	£5,000	1	£5,000
Runner-up	£2,500	1	£2,500
Semi-finalist	£1,000	2	£2,000
Loser in Rd 3	£450	4	£1,800
Loser in Rd 2	£300	8	£2,400
Loser in Rd 1	£150	16	£2,400
Grand Total			£16,100

=== The road to success ===
This tree excludes any preliminary round fixtures

First round
Warrington	31
Oldham	14
Castleford	88
Millom	5
Halifax	20
Barrow	5
Dewsbury	33
Widnes	24
Wakefield Trinity	47
Blackpool Borough	13
Workington Town	20
Hull Kingston Rovers	9
St. Helens	34
Featherstone Rovers	13
Whitehaven	26
Dewsbury Celtic	3
Rochdale Hornets	18
Huddersfield	2
York	32
Swinton	13
Salford	47
Doncaster	17
Bradford Northern	12
Leeds	34
Wigan	37
Batley	0
Keighley	30
Huyton	10
Bramley	20
Hull F.C.	12
New Hunslet	11
Leigh	26

Second round
Warrington	18
Castleford	9
Halifax	7
Dewsbury	16
Wakefield Trinity	10
Workington Town	7
St. Helens	28
Whitehaven	2
Rochdale Hornets	11
York	0
Salford	4
Leeds	17
Wigan	10
Keighley	14
Bramley	24
Leigh	12

Third round
Warrington	20
Dewsbury	12
Wakefield Trinity	18 (16)
St. Helens	18 (27)
Rochdale Hornets	7
Leeds	5
Keighley	8
Bramley	11

Semifinals
Warrington	20
St. Helens	9
Rochdale Hornets	14
Bramley	2

Final
Warrington	27
Rochdale Hornets	16

== Notes and comments ==
1 * RUGBYLEAGUEproject states that the match was played at Bradford, whereas it was played at Lawkholme Lane, Keighley
2 * St Helens official archives give the attendance as 2,500 whereas RUGBYLEAGUEproject gives it as 3,000
3 * Dewsbury Celtic are a Junior (amateur) club from Dewsbury, home ground is Crow Nest Park
4 * The John Player Yearbook 1974–75 and the News of the World Football Annual 1974–75 give the attendance as 1,250 but RUGBYLEAGUEproject give it as 1,276
5 * Millom are a Junior (amateur) club from Cumbria, current home ground is the Coronation Field ground
6 * The highest score, to date in the competition against a Junior club
7 * Widnes official archives give the result as a Wiidnes win
8 * Wigan official archives show a score of 30-3 but RUGBYLEAGUEproject give it as 20-5
9 * Matches kicked off Earlier to accommodate daylight. Use of Floodlights was banned by government order from 15 November 1973 due to mining strikes.
10 * Wigan official archives give score as 28-3 but RUGBYLEAGUEproject give it as 28-2
11 * Wigan's hooker (Colin Clarke) and two Keighley players (Wilmot and Burke) were sent off during this second half of this match.
12 * The John Player Yearbook 1974–75 give the date as 9-12-1974 but RUGBYLEAGUEproject give the date as 29-12-1974
13 * The John Player Yearbook 1974–75 give the date as 9-12-1974 but RUGBYLEAGUEproject give the date as 30-12-1974
14 * The John Player Yearbook 1974–75, the News of the World Football Annual 1974–75 and Wigan official archives give the date as Saturday 5-1-1974 but RUGBYLEAGUEproject give the date as Sunday 6-1-1974
15 * The John Player Yearbook 1974–75 gives the attendance as 10,047 but RUGBYLEAGUEproject give the attendance as 9,347
16 * Central Park was the home ground of Wigan with a final capacity of 18,000, although the record attendance was 47,747 for Wigan v St Helens 27 March 1959

== See also ==
- 1973–74 Northern Rugby Football League season
- 1973 Lancashire Cup
- 1973 Yorkshire Cup
- Player's No.6 Trophy
- Rugby league county cups
