= Alex Murphy (rugby league) =

GB & England international rugby league footballer & coach (born 1939)

Alex Murphy OBE
Personal information
- Full name: Alexander James Murphy
- Born: 22 April 1939 (age 87) St Helens

Playing information
- Position: Halfback, Stand-off, Scrum-half
Club
Years	Team	Pld	T	G	FG	P
1956–66	St Helens	320	175	42	0	609
1966–71	Leigh	113+5	33	96		291
1971–75	Warrington	66+1	9	12	28	107
	Total	505	217	150	28	1007
Representative
Years	Team	Pld	T	G	FG	P
1958–71	Great Britain	27	16	0	0	48
1969	England	2	1	1	0	5
1958–70	Lancashire	14	12	2	0	40
1958	GB tour 1958	16	18	3	0	60
1962	GB tour 1962	8	7	0	0	21

Coaching information
Club
Years	Team	Gms	W	D	L	W%
1966–71	Leigh	205	130	13	62	63
1971–78	Warrington	308	176	14	118	57
1978–80	Salford	93	44	5	44	47
1980–82	Leigh	63	44	3	16	70
1982–84	Wigan	82	49	4	29	60
1985	Leigh	22	12	2	8	55
1985–90	St Helens	167	107	5	55	64
1990–91	Leigh	39	22	1	16	56
1991–94	Huddersfield	96	61	0	35	64
2003	Leigh Centurions	0	0	0	0
	Total	1075	645	47	383	60
Representative
Years	Team	Gms	W	D	L	W%
1975	England	11	7	2	2	64
1973–78	Lancashire	12	9	0	3	75
1985–88	Lancashire	3	0	0	3	0

Alexander James Murphy (born 22 April 1939) is an English former professional rugby league footballer and coach. Sometimes known as 'Murphy the Mouth' and regarded as one of the greatest halfbacks in the history of the British game, he represented Great Britain in 27 Tests. His club career was played at three clubs, St. Helens, Leigh and Warrington. Murphy assumed a player-coach role of the last two clubs and expanded his coaching role toward the end of his playing career to include clubs such as Wigan, Salford and Huddersfield. He later returned to both Warrington and Leigh respectively as a football manager. He was the first player to captain three different clubs to victory in the Challenge Cup Final .

== Background ==
Born in St. Helens, Lancashire on 22 April 1939, Murphy was brought up in Thatto Heath, and at ten years of age had played in both the junior and senior XIIIs at St Austin's School.

== Playing career ==
Murphy had received town and county schoolboy honours by the time he signed with his native St. Helens for £80 on his 16th birthday in 1955. The signing itself was almost akin to a military operation. St. Helens representatives smuggled Murphy 'under cover' to a nearby house until the clock struck midnight to signal Murphy's 16th birthday, and his eligibility to sign professional terms. He was coached from an early age by Jim Sullivan. During his national service Murphy played rugby union for the Royal Air Force, frequently playing for an Air Force team the same week as playing rugby league for St. Helens.

=== St. Helens ===
Murphy began his career at St. Helens playing reserve team rugby (known then as the 'A' team). After several "A" team games, Murphy demanded a place in the first team. This demand was refused and so he promptly demanded a transfer. The dispute was settled and Murphy's first team début was against Whitehaven at Knowsley Road.

Murphy's career at St. Helens went on to be long and successful. While still a teenager, he was selected to tour Australasia with the Great Britain side in 1958, becoming the youngest touring player at the time, and helping Great Britain to victory in the famous second Test in which they were down to ten men. He scored 21 tries in 20 appearances on that tour.

He won the Championship with St. Helens in 1958–59 season. The following year he played in Great Britain's World Cup-winning side. With his club he claimed the Challenge Cup in 1961.

On the 1962 Ashes tour he suffered a shoulder injury which caused him to miss three months of the domestic season and there was some speculation he would never play again. On this tour he scored 9 tries in 11 appearances.

Murphy became the first British rugby league footballer to have two testimonial matches. They were at St. Helens in 1965, and at Warrington in 1976.

Alex Murphy played at centre and scored a conversion in St. Helens' 35–12 victory over Halifax in the Championship Final during the 1965–66 season at Station Road, Swinton on Saturday 28 May 1966, in front of a crowd of 30,165.

Alex Murphy played scrum-half, and scored a try in St. Helens' 12–6 victory over Wigan in the 1961 Challenge Cup Final during the 1960–61 season at Wembley Stadium, London on Saturday 13 May 1961, in front of a crowd of 94,672, and played at centre and scored a conversion in the 21–2 victory over Wigan in the 1966 Challenge Cup Final during the 1965–66 season at Wembley Stadium, London on Saturday 21 May 1966, in front of a crowd of 98,536.

Alex Murphy played scrum-half in St. Helens' 2–12 defeat by Oldham in the 1958 Lancashire Cup Final during the 1958–59 season at Station Road, Swinton on Saturday 25 October 1958, played scrum-half in the 4–5 defeat by Warrington in the 1959 Lancashire Cup Final during the 1959–60 season at Central Park, Wigan on Saturday 31 October 1959, played scrum-half in the 15–9 victory over Swinton in the 1960 Lancashire Cup Final during the 1960–61 season at Central Park, Wigan on Saturday 29 October 1960, played scrum-half, and scored a try in the 25–9 victory over Swinton in the 1961 Lancashire Cup Final during the 1961–62 season at Central Park, Wigan on Saturday 11 November 1961, played scrum-half in the 15–4 victory over Leigh in the 1962 Lancashire Cup Final during the 1962–63 season at Station Road, Swinton on Saturday 26 October 1963, and played scrum-half in the 12–4 victory over Swinton in the 1964 Lancashire Cup Final during the 1964–65 season at Central Park, Wigan on Saturday 24 October 1964.

Alex Murphy played stand-off in St. Helens' 0–4 defeat by Castleford in the 1965 BBC2 Floodlit Trophy Final during the 1965–66 season at Knowsley Road, St. Helens on Tuesday 14 December 1965

=== Leigh ===
Murphy left St. Helens to become player-coach at Leigh because he was unhappy at being moved to the centres to accommodate the signing of Tommy Bishop. As the 1966–67 season began, Murphy declined to play for St. Helens. The Australian club, North Sydney indicated their interest in signing him. At the end of September, Murphy submitted a written transfer request to the St. Helens board who accepted it, putting him on the list at £12,000.

North Sydney tabled a bid of £8,000 for Murphy which was accepted. However, at the last minute, Murphy agreed to a 5-year deal with Leigh to become the highest paid coach in the Rugby Football League.

Murphy's first game in charge of his new team was against his former club in a league match at Hilton Park. Murphy's Leigh overcame a depleted St. Helens side by 29–5. Murphy later recounted in an issue of the Rugby Leaguer some 20 years later that:

"It never entered my mind to leave Saints in the first place. But events took over and there was a lot of pride involved on both sides and the situation reached the stage where a parting of the ways became inevitable."

Alex Murphy played scrum-half, and was the coach, and was man-of-the-match winning the Lance Todd Trophy in Leigh's 24–7 victory over Leeds in the 1971 Challenge Cup Final during the 1970–71 season at Wembley Stadium, London on Saturday 15 May 1971, in front of a crowd of 85,514. This was a match where Murphy's ability to attract controversy was once again exemplified. He was involved in an altercation with Leeds' Syd Hynes which resulted in Hynes being sent off for headbutting Murphy. Murphy was carried off the pitch on a stretcher, but later returned to the bench and was able to lift the trophy at the end of the game. Over the years, tales of Murphy winking to his teammates as he was carried from the field have endured, and Hynes always maintained his innocence.

Alex Murphy played scrum-half, and scored a conversion in Leigh's 2–11 defeat by Swinton in the 1969 Lancashire Cup Final during the 1969–70 season at Central Park, Wigan on Saturday 1 November 1969, and played scrum-half in the 7–4 victory over St. Helens in the 1970 Lancashire Cup Final replay during the 1970–71 season at Station Road, Swinton on Saturday 28 November 1970.

Alex Murphy played scrum-half, and was the coach in Leigh's 5–8 defeat by Castleford in the 1967 BBC2 Floodlit Trophy Final during the 1967–68 season at Headingley, Leeds on Saturday 16 January 1968, and played scrum-half, was the coach, and scored a conversion in the 11–6 victory over Wigan in the 1969 BBC2 Floodlit Trophy Final during the 1969–70 season at Central Park, Wigan on Tuesday 16 December 1969.

=== Warrington ===
Murphy left Leigh shortly afterwards to become player-coach at Warrington. Murphy won one Great Britain cap while at Warrington. In 1973 a 20-match unbeaten run in the league helped Warrington win the League Leader's Trophy. The 1973–74 season was the most successful at Warrington, with the club winning the Challenge Cup, Captain Morgan trophy, John Player trophy and Club Merit trophy. The highlight was when Murphy coached, captained and played stand-off in Warrington's 24–9 victory over Featherstone Rovers in the 1974 Challenge Cup Final during the 1973–74 season at Wembley Stadium, London on Saturday 11 May 1974, in front of a crowd of 77,400. He was again the coach in the 7–14 defeat by Widnes in the 1975 Challenge Cup Final during the 1974–75 season at Wembley Stadium, London on Saturday 10 May 1975, in front of a crowd of 85,998, but missed playing in the match through injury, retiring as a player shortly after but remaining as coach of the club until 1978. During his time as the Warrington coach, his old rivals, Widnes succeeded in reaching another Challenge Cup final in 1976, their opponents being St. Helens. Murphy caused controversy by declaring that he would jump off the Runcorn-Widnes Bridge Silver Jubilee Bridge and into the River Mersey if Widnes won; luckily for him, Widnes were defeated 20 points to 5 and Murphy managed to keep his feet on dry land.

Alex Murphy was the coach in Warrington's 0–0 draw with Salford in the 1974 BBC2 Floodlit Trophy Final during the 1974–75 season at The Willows, Salford on Tuesday 17 December 1974, and in the 5–10 defeat by Salford in the 1974 BBC2 Floodlit Trophy Final replay during the 1974–75 season at Wilderspool Stadium, Warrington on Tuesday 28 January 1975.

Alex Murphy was the coach in Warrington's 4–0 victory over Featherstone Rovers in the 1973–74 Captain Morgan Trophy Final during the 1973–74 season at The Willows, Salford on Saturday 26 January 1974, in front of a crowd of 5,259.

== Coaching career ==
Upon retirement, Murphy built upon the experience he had acquired as a player-coach by taking up the reins as a full-time coach. He was co-coach of England with Bill Oxley during the 1975 World Series.

After Warrington, Murphy was appointed to high-profile roles at Salford (May 1978 to November 1980), Leigh (1980 to 1982) where in 1982 he guided Leigh to the Division 1 championship and Lancashire cup winners, before taking the role of coach of Wigan in 1982. There, he led them to victory in the John Player Trophy in 1983, and took them to the Challenge Cup Final in 1984, where they lost to Widnes. He left at the start of the next season, following a row with vice chairman Maurice Lindsay.

In 1988 Murphy was an inaugural inductee into the Rugby League Hall of Fame.

He took over as coach of St. Helens in 1986, taking them to Wembley Stadium, London in 1987, against Halifax, and again in 1989 where they played Wigan. St Helens lost by one point to Halifax, and were humiliated by Wigan in an error-ridden performance two years later, losing 27–0, becoming the fourth side ever to be held scoreless in a Challenge Cup Final at Wembley, after Halifax, Widnes and Barrow were kept scoreless in three consecutive finals between 1949 and 1951. During the last 10 minutes of the Challenge Cup Final, St. Helens received a penalty that was well within kicking range for either of their goal kickers, Great Britain international Paul Loughlin, and Australian dual international Michael O'Connor. No wanting to be another team to be held scoreless in a Cup Final at Wembley, Murphy frantically gestured from the sideline to team captain Paul Vautin to take the kick at goal despite the scoreline. Vautin ignored Murphy's instructions and instead the ball was kicked into touch for a tap restart. Wigan's defense held firm though and St. Helens last scoring opportunity was lost. This led to tension between Murphy and Vautin for a number of years until they worked together for the Australian Nine Network during television coverage of The Ashes series during the 1994 Kangaroo tour.

In 1991, he joined Huddersfield: within a year, promotion to the Second Division had been achieved.

After a six-year absence from rugby league, Murphy returned to the game in 2003 as football director of Leigh after the National League One club sacked coach Paul Terzis.

== Post-retirement ==
In the 1999 New Year Honours, Murphy was awarded the OBE for services to the game of rugby league. In 2000 his autobiography, Saint and Sinner was published. Murphy was also employed as a commentator by BBC television for a number of years working alongside long-time league commentators Eddie Waring, and later former dual rugby international Ray French. He also worked for Australia's Nine Network as an expert commentator during the 1994 Kangaroo tour. He was also employed to write opinion columns for newspapers such as the Daily Mirror, and the Manchester Evening News. One was known as 'Murphy's Mouth.' In 2006 he became Chairman of Oxford Cavaliers rugby league club. Murphy is an inductee in both the St Helens RFC Hall of Fame, and the Warrington Wolves RLFC Hall of Fame.
