= Derek Whitehead =

English rugby league footballer (1944–2025)

- Whitehead in a striped club jersey

Personal information
- Born: 14 February 1944
- Died: 5 April 2025 (aged 81) Swinton, Greater Manchester, England

Playing information
- Height: 5 ft 10 in (1.78 m)
- Weight: 13 st 0 lb (83 kg)
- Position: Fullback
Club
Years	Team	Pld	T	G	FG	P
1964–68	Swinton	99	22	260	0	586
1968–69	Oldham	49	2	139	0	284
1969–79	Warrington	274	18	713	21	1519
	Total	422	42	1112	21	2389
Representative
Years	Team	Pld	T	G	FG	P
1968–74	Lancashire	5	1	12	0	27
1971	Great Britain	3	1	6	0	15

Derek Whitehead (14 February 1944 – 5 April 2025) was an English professional rugby league footballer who played in the 1960s and 1970s. He played at representative level for Great Britain and Lancashire, and at club level for Folly Lane ARLFC (in Pendlebury), Swinton, Oldham and Warrington, as a goal-kicking fullback.

== Background ==
Whitehead was a pupil at Cromwell Road Secondary Modern School for Boys in Pendlebury from 1955 to 1959. He died in Swinton, Greater Manchester on 5 April 2025, at the age of 81.

== Playing career ==
=== International honours ===
Whitehead won caps for Great Britain while at Warrington in 1971 against France (2 matches), and New Zealand.

=== Challenge Cup Final appearances ===
Whitehead played fullback, scored seven goals, and was man of the match winning the Lance Todd Trophy in Warrington's 24–9 victory over Featherstone Rovers in the 1974 Challenge Cup Final during the 1973–74 season at Wembley Stadium, London on Saturday 11 May 1974, in front of a crowd of 77,400, and scored two goals in the 7–14 defeat by Widnes in the 1975 Challenge Cup Final during the 1974–75 season at Wembley Stadium, London on Saturday 10 May 1975, in front of a crowd of 85,998.

=== County Cup Final appearances ===
Whitehead played left wing in Oldham's defeat by St. Helens in the 1968 Lancashire Cup Final during the 1968–69 season at Central Park, Wigan on Friday 25 October 1968.

=== BBC2 Floodlit Trophy Final appearances ===
Whitehead played right wing and scored a try in Swinton's 2–7 defeat by Castleford in the 1966 BBC2 Floodlit Trophy Final during the 1966–67 season at Wheldon Road, Castleford on Tuesday 20 December 1966, played fullback in Warrington's 0–0 draw with Salford in the 1974 BBC2 Floodlit Trophy Final during the 1974–75 season at the Willows, Salford on Tuesday 17 December 1974, and played right wing, and scored a goal in the 5–10 defeat by Salford in the 1974 BBC2 Floodlit Trophy Final replay during the 1974–75 season at Wilderspool Stadium, Warrington on Tuesday 28 January 1975.

=== Player's No.6 Trophy Final appearances ===
Whitehead played fullback, and scored a try, and 6-goals in Warrington's 27–16 victory over Rochdale Hornets in the 1973–74 Player's No.6 Trophy Final during the 1973–74 season at Central Park, Wigan on Saturday 9 February 1974. Derek Whitehead set the record for the most goals in a Regal Trophy (or precursors) Final with 6-goals, this was extended to 8-goals by Frano Botica, Derek Whitehead set the record for the most points in a Regal Trophy (or precursors) Final with 15-points, this was extended to 16-points by Frano Botica.

=== Captain Morgan Trophy Final appearances ===
Whitehead played fullback, scored two goals, and was presented with an 80oz magnum bottle of Captain Morgan Rum in Warrington's 4–0 victory over Featherstone Rovers in the 1973–74 Captain Morgan Trophy Final during the 1973–74 season at the Willows, Salford on Saturday 26 January 1974, in front of a crowd of 5,259.

=== Testimonial match ===
Whitehead's Testimonial match at Warrington took place in 1980.

== Honoured at Warrington ==
Whitehead is a Warrington Wolves Hall of Fame inductee.
