= Keith Fielding =

GB & England dual-code rugby international footballer

- Full name: Keith John Fielding
- Born: 8 July 1949 (age 77) Birmingham, England

Rugby union career
- Position: Wing
Senior career
Years	Team	Apps	(Points)
–	Loughborough		
1968–73	Moseley		
International career
Years	Team	Apps	(Points)
1969–72	England	10	(3)
- Rugby league career

Playing information
- Position: Wing
Club
Years	Team	Pld	T	G	FG	P
1973–83	Salford	320	253	133	0	1025
Representative
Years	Team	Pld	T	G	FG	P
1975	England	7	8	0	0	24
1974–77	Great Britain	4	3	0	0	9
1975	England tour games	7	9	0	0	27
1977	GB tour games	6	10	0	0	30
1977–78	Lancashire	3	3	0	0	9
1974	Other Nationalities	1	1	0	0	3

Keith John Fielding (born 8 July 1949) is an English dual-code international rugby footballer who played in the 1960s, 1970s and 1980s as a winger. He played representative level rugby union for England, and at club level for Moseley Rugby Football Club before switching to rugby league in 1973, and went on to play representative level rugby league for Great Britain and England, and at club level for Salford.

== Rugby union career ==
Born in Birmingham, Fielding attended King Edward VI Five Ways school, where he began playing rugby union. In 1967, Fielding represented England Schools 19 Group.

After leaving school, Fielding went on to play for Loughborough Colleges and Moseley. Fielding won his first cap for England on 8 February 1969, playing against Ireland. Later that month, he scored a try in his second appearance for England in a match against France. In December 1969, he played in England's 11–8 win against South Africa, which was the team's first ever victory against the Springboks.

In 1970, Fielding played a key role in Loughborough College's Middlesex Sevens victory, scoring 11 tries during the tournament, including four in the final against Edinburgh Wanderers.

In 1971, Fielding was signed by Leicester Tigers, but returned to Moseley after playing only one first team game for the club.

Fielding returned to the England squad in 1972, playing in all four matches of the 1972 Five Nations. He made the last of his 10 appearances for England in March 1972 against Scotland.

Fielding scored 39 tries for Moseley in his final season at the club, the second highest total in Britain that year. In April 1973, Fielding represented England in the first ever international rugby sevens tournament.

== Rugby league career ==
=== Salford ===
In May 1973, Fielding was signed by rugby league club Salford for a fee of £8,500.

Fielding played right wing in Salford's 9–19 defeat by Wigan in the 1973 Lancashire Cup Final during the 1973–74 season at Wilderspool Stadium, Warrington on Saturday 13 October 1973, played right wing, and scored a goal in the 2–6 defeat by Widnes in the 1974 Lancashire Cup Final during the 1974–75 season at Central Park, Wigan on Saturday 2 November 1974, and played right wing in the 7–16 defeat by Widnes in the 1975 Lancashire Cup Final during the 1975–76 season at Central Park, Wigan on Saturday 4 October 1975.

Fielding played right wing in Salford's 0–0 draw with Warrington in the 1974 BBC2 Floodlit Trophy Final during the 1974–75 season at The Willows, Salford on Tuesday 17 December 1974, and played right wing, and scored a try in the 10–5 victory over Warrington in the 1974 BBC2 Floodlit Trophy Final replay during the 1974–75 season at Wilderspool Stadium, Warrington on Tuesday 28 January 1975.

=== International honours ===
Fielding won caps for England while at Salford in 1975 against France, in the 1975 Rugby League World Cup against France, Wales, New Zealand, Australia, Wales and France, in 1975 against Papua New Guinea (non-Test).

He equalled the England national team's record for most tries by an individual in a match when he scored four against France at Parc Lescure, Bordeaux on Saturday 11 October 1975.

Fielding also won caps for Great Britain (RL) while at Salford in 1974 against France (2 matches), and in the 1977 Rugby League World Cup against France, and Australia.

== Superstars ==
Keith Fielding achieved fame by participating in the televised all-around sports competition Superstars, winning the 1977 French European Superstars Heat, the 1981 British Final and the 1981 Challenge of Champions. He also finished second in the 1977 European Final, fifth in the 1978 World Final, third in the 1981 International Final, fifth in the 1981 World Final and third in the 1982 British Final.

=== Superstars record ===
Year	Event	Position
1977	French Heat	1st
1977	European Final	2nd
1978	World Final	5th
1981	Challenge of the Champions	1st
1981	British Final	1st
1981	International	3rd
1981	World Final	5th
1982	British Final	3rd

== Outside of rugby ==
Fielding was a teacher at Marple Hall School and Bramhall High School in Stockport. Fielding quit his role at the latter school in 2008 after declaring the job was too stressful.
