= 1974–75 BBC2 Floodlit Trophy =

- Structure: Floodlit knockout championship
- Teams: 22
- Winners: Salford
- Runners-up: Warrington

The 1974–75 BBC2 Floodlit Trophy was the tenth occasion on which the BBC2 Floodlit Trophy competition had been held. A new name was put on the trophy when Salford won by beating Warrington by the score of 10-5 in a replay. The final was played at The Willows, Salford, (historically in the county of Lancashire). The attendance was 4,473, receipts were £1913 and the score 0-0. The replay was at Wilderspool. The attendance was 5,778, receipts were £2434 and the score 10-5. This was the first (and only) floodlit final to require a replay after a drawn first match.

== Background ==
This season saw New Hunslet join the competition, which increased the number of entrants by one, to a new high total of twenty-two. The format remained the same as the last season with the preliminary round (generally) played on a two-legged home and away basis and the rest of the tournament being played on a knock-out basis. The exceptions to the two-legged preliminary rounds were the two matches where the four clubs had agreed to play a sudden-death match to avoid fixture congestion. The preliminary round now involved twelve clubs, to reduce the numbers taking part in the competition proper to just sixteen.

== Competition and results ==
=== Preliminary round ===
Involved six matches and 12 clubs. Huddersfield, Castleford, Hull and Keighley agreed to play one leg only; the four other ties were played over two legs.

==== First leg ====
Game No	Fixture date	Home team	Score	Away team	Venue	agg	Att	Rec	Notes	Ref
P1	Tue 10 Sep 1974	Oldham	8-7	Hull Kingston Rovers	Watersheddings		1,381			
P1	Wed 11 Sep 1974	Huddersfield	12-4	Castleford	Fartown		656			
P1	Tue 17 Sep 1974	Hull F.C.	12-2	Keighley	Boulevard		1,500			
P1	Tue 17 Sep 1974	St. Helens	21-12	Wakefield Trinity	Knowsley Road		3,272		1	
P1	Tue 17 Sep 1974	Widnes	15-13	Barrow	Naughton Park		3,000			
P1	Tue 24 Sep 1974	Leigh	19-5	Bramley	Hilton Park		2,000			

==== Second leg ====
Involved 4 matches and the same 8 Clubs in reverse fixtures (the other two matches were on a single leg basis)

Game No	Fixture date	Home team	Score	Away team	Venue	agg	Att	Rec	Notes	Ref
P2	Tue 17 Sep 1974	Hull Kingston Rovers	19-11	Oldham	Craven Park (1)	26-19	2,252			
P2	Tue 24 Sep 1974	Wakefield Trinity	18-15	St. Helens	Belle Vue	30-36	2,583			
P2	Tue 1 Oct 1974	Barrow	3-8	Widnes	Craven Park	16-23	870			
P2	Wed 2 Oct 1974	Bramley	15-9	Leigh	McLaren Field	20-28	1.100			

=== First round ===
Involved 8 matches and 16 clubs

Game No	Fixture date	Home team	Score	Away team	Venue	Att	Rec	Notes	Ref
1	Tue 1 Oct 1974	Warrington	10-5	Swinton	Wilderspool	3,552			
2	Tue 8 Oct 1974	Halifax	15-4	Whitehaven	Thrum Hall	750			
3	Tue 15 Oct 1974	St. Helens	30-2	Leeds	Knowsley Road	3,576		4	
4	Tue 22 Oct 1974	Dewsbury	8-14	Leigh	Crown Flatt	1,400		5	
5	Wed 23 Oct 1974	New Hunslet	12-5	Widnes	Elland Road Greyhound Stadium	1,250		6	
6	Tue 29 Oct 1974	Salford	16-2	Huddersfield	The Willows	2,926			
7	Wed 30 Oct 1974	Hull Kingston Rovers	20-10	Wigan	Craven Park (1)	2,009			
8	Wed 30 Oct 1974	Rochdale Hornets	14-4	Hull F.C.	Athletic Grounds	780			

=== Second Round ===
Involved 4 matches with 8 clubs

Game No	Fixture date	Home team	Score	Away team	Venue	Att	Rec	Notes	Ref
1	Tue 5 Nov 1974	Warrington	36-17	New Hunslet	Wilderspool	2,144			
2	Tue 12 Nov 1974	St. Helens	7-11	Salford	Knowsley Road	4,474		7	
3	Tue 19 Nov 1974	Leigh	8-0	Rochdale Hornets	Hilton Park	2,000			
4	Tue 26 Nov 1974	Halifax	24-28	Hull Kingston Rovers	Thrum Hall	752			

=== Semi-finals ===
Involved 2 matches and 4 clubs

Game No	Fixture date	Home team	Score	Away team	Venue	Att	Rec	Notes	Ref
1	Tue 3 Dec 1974	Salford	27-10	Hull Kingston Rovers	The Willows	3,727		3	
2	Tue 10 Dec 1974	Warrington	32-0	Leigh	Wilderspool	2,495		3	

=== Final ===
17 December 1974

Salford	0 – 0	Warrington

The Willows, Salford
Attendance: 4,473
Referee: Billy Thompson (Huddersfield)

Salford	No	Warrington
	Teams	
Paul Charlton	1	Derek Whitehead
Keith Fielding	2	Dave Sutton
Chris Hesketh	3	Dave Cunliffe
Gordon Graham	4	Alan Whittle
Maurice Richards	5	John Bevan
Tom Brophy	6	Wilf Briggs
Peter Banner	7	Parry Gordon
Mike Coulman	8	Dave Chisnall
Ellis Devlin	9	Kevin Ashcroft
Alan Grice	10	Gilly Wright
John Knighton	11	Wayne Gaskell
Colin Dixon	12	Tommy Conroy
Eric Prescott	13	Barry Philbin
	Subs	
John Taylor (for Brophy)	14	John Lowe (for Cunliffe)
Graham MacKay	15	Peter Jewitt (for Philbin)
Les Bettinson	Coach	Alex Murphy

==== Replay ====
An unusual occurrence, a "seven point try", was scored by Salford in the replay. Following the try scored by winger Keith Fielding, successfully converted by David Watkins, a further penalty was awarded because Fielding had been fouled after scoring. Watkins kicked the penalty goal to give Salford a 7–0 lead.

28 January 1975

Warrington	5 – 10	Salford
Tries: Bevan; Goals: Whitehead		Tries: Fielding, Richards; Goals: Watkins (2)

Wilderspool, Warrington
Attendance: 5,778
Referee: Billy Thompson (Huddersfield)

Warrington	No	Salford
	Teams	
Dave Cunliffe	1	Frank Stead
Derek Whitehead	2	Keith Fielding
Billy Pickup	3	David Watkins
Alan Whittle	4	Chris Hesketh
John Bevan	5	Maurice Richards
Derek Noonan	6	Ken Gill
Parry Gordon	7	Peter Banner
David "Dave" Chisnall	8	Alan Grice
Kevin Ashcroft	9	Peter Walker
Robert "Bobby" Wanbon	10	Graham MacKay
Tommy Conroy	11	Colin Dixon
Mike Nicholas	12	John Knighton
Barry Philbin	13	Eric Prescott
	Subs	
Wilf Briggs (for Noonan)	14	
Brian Brady (for Nicholas)	15	
Alex Murphy	Coach	Les Bettinson

=== The road to success ===
This tree excludes any preliminary round fixtures

First round
St. Helens	30
Leeds	2
Salford	16
Huddersfield	2
Halifax	15
Whitehaven	4
Hull Kingston Rovers	20
Wigan	10
Warrington	10
Swinton	5
New Hunslet	12
Widnes	5
Dewsbury	8
Leigh	14
Rochdale Hornets	14
Hull F.C.	4

Second round
St. Helens	7
Salford	11
Halifax	24
Hull Kingston Rovers	28
Warrington	36
New Hunslet	17
Leigh	8
Rochdale Hornets	0

Semi-finals
Salford	27
Hull Kingston Rovers	10
Warrington	32
Leigh	0

Final
Salford	0 (10)
Warrington	0 (5)

== See also ==
- 1974–75 Northern Rugby Football League season
- BBC2 Floodlit Trophy
