= Peter Banner (rugby league) =

Wales international rugby league footballer (1948–2025)

Personal information
- Born: August 1948 Rochdale, England
- Died: 6 June 2025 (aged 76)

Playing information
- Position: Scrum-half
Club
Years	Team	Pld	T	G	FG	P
1967–75	Salford	180	24	1	0	74
1975	→ Halifax (loan)	5	0	0	0	0
1975–76	Featherstone Rovers	21	1	0	0	3
1976–77	Leeds	25	4	0	0	12
	Total	231	29	1	0	89
Representative
Years	Team	Pld	T	G	FG	P
1972	Lancashire	2	0	0	0	0
1975	Wales	9	2	0	0	6

Peter Banner (August 1948 – 6 June 2025) was an English professional rugby league footballer who played as a scrum-half in the 1960s and 1970s. He played at representative level for Wales, and at club level for Salford, Featherstone Rovers and Leeds.

== Background ==
Peter Banner was born in Rochdale, Lancashire, England.

== Club career ==
=== Salford ===
Banner was signed by Salford in March 1967 from Spotland Rangers, and went on to make 180 appearances for the club.

Banner played in three consecutive Lancashire Cup finals with Salford. He scored a try in Salford's 25–11 victory over Swinton in the 1972 Final at Wilderspool Stadium, Warrington on Saturday 21 October 1972. He also played in the 9–19 defeat by Wigan in the 1973 Final on Saturday 13 October 1973 (also held at Wilderspool Stadium, Warrington), and played in the 2–6 defeat by Widnes in the 1974 Final at Central Park, Wigan on Saturday 2 November 1974.

Banner played in Salford's 7–12 defeat by Leeds in the 1972–73 Player's No.6 Trophy Final at Fartown Ground, Huddersfield on Saturday 24 March 1973.

Banner appeared for Salford in a 0–0 draw against Warrington in the 1974 BBC2 Floodlit Trophy Final at The Willows, Salford on Tuesday 17 December 1974, and also played in the replay held at Wilderspool Stadium, Warrington on Tuesday 28 January 1975, which Salford won 10–5.

=== Later career ===
Banner lost his place in the starting lineup following the arrival of Steve Nash. After spending a month on loan at Halifax, he was signed by Featherstone Rovers for £4,500 in September 1975. Banner made 21 appearances for the club during the 1975–76 season.

In August 1976, he signed for Leeds for a fee of £5,000. Banner won the 1976 Yorkshire Cup with Leeds, winning 16–12 in the final against his former club Featherstone Rovers on 16 October 1976. He also helped Leeds reach the 1977 Challenge Cup final, but did not play in the final itself, as he had left the club to emigrate to Australia.

== Representative honours ==
Although born in England, Banner was eligible to represent Wales due to his Welsh ancestry, and was selected to play for the team in the 1975 European Championship and 1975 World Cup. He won nine caps for Wales, playing both games at the European Championship and seven matches in the World Cup.

Banner also represented Lancashire, playing both games in the 1972–73 County Championship.

== Death ==
Banner died on 6 June 2025, at the age of 76.

== Sources ==
- Match programme - Wales vs France (16 February 1975)
