= 1969–70 BBC2 Floodlit Trophy =

- Structure: Floodlit knockout championship
- Teams: 18
- Winners: Leigh
- Runners-up: Wigan

The 1969–70 BBC2 Floodlit Trophy was the fifth occasion on which the BBC2 Floodlit Trophy competition had been held.
This year was another new name on the trophy after the 1969 runner-up defeated the reigning cup-holders
Leigh won the trophy by beating Wigan by the score of 11-6
The match was played at Central Park, Wigan, (historically in the county of Lancashire). The attendance was 12,312 and receipts were £2,854
This was to be Wigan's last appearance in the final of the competition.

== Background ==
This season saw no changes in the entrants, no new members and no withdrawals, the number remaining at eighteen.
The format remained the same as last season with the games in the preliminary round being on a two-legged home and away basis.
This preliminary round involved four clubs, to reduce the numbers to sixteen, followed by a straightforward knock out competition.

== Competition and results ==
=== Preliminary round – first leg ===
Involved 2 matches and 4 clubs

| Game No | Fixture date | Home team | Score | Away team | Venue | agg | Att | Rec | Notes | Ref |
|---|---|---|---|---|---|---|---|---|---|---|
| P1 | Tue 26 Aug 1969 | Wigan | 22-6 | Warrington | Central Park | | | | | |
| P1 | Mon 29 Sep 1969 | Huddersfield | 10-18 | Castleford | Fartown | | 1750 | | 1 | |

=== Preliminary round – second leg ===
Involved 2 matches with the same 4 clubs with reverse fixtures

| Game No | Fixture date | Home team | Score | Away team | Venue | agg | Att | Rec | Notes | Ref |
|---|---|---|---|---|---|---|---|---|---|---|
| P2 | Mon 29 Sep 1969 | Warrington | 15-10 | Wigan | Wilderspool | 21-32 | | | | |
| P2 | Wed 8 Oct 1969 | Castleford | 19-2 | Huddersfield | Wheldon Road | 37-12 | 4000 | | | |

=== Round 1 – first round ===
Involved 8 matches and 16 clubs

| Game No | Fixture date | Home team | Score | Away team | Venue | Att | Rec | Notes | Ref |
|---|---|---|---|---|---|---|---|---|---|
| 1 | Tue 30 Sep 1969 | Halifax | 9-27 | Leeds | Thrum Hall | | | | |
| 2 | Tue 7 Oct 1969 | Leigh | 25-8 | Wakefield Trinity | Hilton Park | | | | |
| 3 | Mon 13 Oct 1969 | Oldham | 24-13 | Rochdale Hornets | Watersheddings | | | | |
| 4 | Mon 13 Oct 1969 | Swinton | 9-17 | St. Helens | Station Road | 4900 | | | |
| 5 | Tue 14 Oct 1969 | Wigan | 24-5 | Hull F.C. | Central Park | | | 2 | |
| 6 | Mon 20 Oct 1969 | Barrow | 13-10 | Widnes | Craven Park | | | | |
| 7 | Tue 21 Oct 1969 | Salford | 12-16 | Castleford | The Willows | | | | |
| 8 | Tue 28 Oct 1969 | Keighley | 6-15 | Hull Kingston Rovers | Lawkholme Lane | | | | |

=== Round 2 - quarterfinals ===
Involved 4 matches with 8 clubs

| Game No | Fixture date | Home team | Score | Away team | Venue | Att | Rec | Notes | Ref |
|---|---|---|---|---|---|---|---|---|---|
| 1 | Tue 4 Nov 1969 | Barrow | 6-11 | St. Helens | Craven Park | 4500 | | | |
| 2 | Tue 11 Nov 1969 | Wigan | 12-0 | Oldham | Central Park | | | 2 | |
| 3 | Tue 18 Nov 1969 | Hull Kingston Rovers | 6-12 | Leigh | Craven Park (1) | | | | |
| 4 | Tue 25 Nov 1969 | Castleford | 9-7 | Leeds | Wheldon Road | | | | |

=== Round 3 – semifinals ===
Involved 2 matches and 4 clubs

| Game No | Fixture date | Home team | Score | Away team | Venue | Att | Rec | Notes | Ref |
|---|---|---|---|---|---|---|---|---|---|
| 1 | Tue 2 Dec 1969 | Castleford | 11-12 | Leigh | Wheldon Road | | | | |
| 2 | Tue 9 Dec 1969 | Wigan | 13-13 | St. Helens | Central Park | 8850 | | 2 | |

=== Round 3 – semifinals – replays ===
Involved 1 match and 2 clubs

| Game No | Fixture date | Home team | Score | Away team | Venue | Att | Rec | Notes | Ref |
|---|---|---|---|---|---|---|---|---|---|
| R | Thu 11 Dec 1969 | St. Helens | 9-15 | Wigan | Knowsley Road | 11500 | | | |

=== Final ===
| Game No | Fixture date | Home team | Score | Away team | Venue | Att | Rec | Notes | Ref |
|---|---|---|---|---|---|---|---|---|---|
| | Tuesday 16 December 1969 | Wigan | 6-11 | Leigh | Central Park | 12,312 | 2,854 | 2 3 | |

==== Teams and scorers ====
| Leigh | No. | Wigan |
|---|---|---|
| | teams | |
| Stuart Ferguson | 1 | Cliff Hill |
| Rod Tickle | 2 | Stuart Wright |
| Stan Dorrington | 3 | Bill Francis |
| Mick Collins | 4 | Peter Rowe |
| Joseph Walsh | 5 | Kevin O'Loughlin |
| David Eckersley | 6 | David Hill |
| Alex Murphy | 7 | Johnny Jackson |
| David Chisnall | 8 | John Stephens |
| Kevin Ashcroft | 9 | Colin Clarke |
| Derek Watts | 10 | Keith Ashcroft |
| Bob Welding | 11 | Bill Ashurst |
| Paul Grimes | 12 | Keith Mills |
| Geoff Lyon | 13 | Doug Laughton |
| Alex Murphy | Coach | Eric Ashton |
| 11 | score | 6 |
| 11 | HT | 2 |
| | Scorers | |
| | Tries | |
| Rod Tickle (1) | T | |
| | Goals | |
| Stuart Ferguson (3) | G | Bill Francis (2) |
| Alex Murphy (1) | G | David Hill (1) |
| Referee | | William "Billy" H. Thompson (Huddersfield) |

Scoring - Try = three (3) points - Goal = two (2) points - Drop goal = two (2) points

=== The road to success ===
This tree excludes any preliminary round fixtures

First round
Wigan | 24
Hull F.C. | 5
Oldham | 24
Rochdale Hornets | 13
Barrow | 13
Widnes | 10
Swinton | 9
St. Helens | 17
Salford | 12
Castleford | 16
Halifax | 9
Leeds | 27
Keighley | 6
Hull Kingston Rovers | 15
Leigh | 25
Wakefield Trinity | 8

Second round
Wigan | 12
Oldham | 0
Barrow | 6
St. Helens | 11
Castleford | 9
Leeds | 7
Hull Kingston Rovers | 6
Leigh | 12

Semi-finals
Wigan | 13 (15)
St. Helens | 13 (9)
Castleford | 11
Leigh | 12

Final
Wigan | 6
Leigh | 11

== Notes and comments ==
1 * Huddersfield (who joined the competition in season 1967–68) play their first game at home in the competition
2 * This match was televised
3 * Central Park was the home ground of Wigan with a final capacity of 18,000, although the record attendance was 47,747 for Wigan v St Helens 27 March 1959

== See also ==
- 1969–70 Northern Rugby Football League season
- 1969 Lancashire Cup
- 1969 Yorkshire Cup
- BBC2 Floodlit Trophy
- Rugby league county cups
