= Keith Bell =

Keith Bell may refer to:

- Keith Bell (rugby union) (born 1948), former rugby union player who represented Australia
- Keith Bell (rugby league, born 1934) (1934–2017), rugby league player of the 1950s for New Zealand, Auckland, and Ponsonby
- Keith Bell (rugby league, born 1953), English rugby league player of the 1970s, 1980s and 1990s
- Keith Bell (American politician) (born 1962), American politician and member of Texas House of Representatives
- Keith Bell (Bahamian politician), member of parliament
