= Dave Dyas =

English rugby league footballer

David Dyas
Personal information
- Full name: David Dyas

Playing information
- Position: Wing
Club
Years	Team	Pld	T	G	FG	P
1973–78/79	Featherstone Rovers	78+6	24	0	0	72
≤1984–≥85	Bramley
	Total	84	24	0	0	72

David Dyas is a former professional rugby league footballer who played in the 1970s and 1980s. He played at club level for Featherstone Rovers and Bramley, as a wing.

== Playing career ==
Dyas made his début for Featherstone Rovers on Sunday 7 January 1973.

=== Challenge Cup Final appearances ===
Dyas played on the wing in Featherstone Rovers' 9-24 defeat by Warrington in the 1974 Challenge Cup Final during the 1973–74 season at Wembley Stadium, London on Saturday 11 May 1974, in front of a crowd of 77,400.
