= Harold Box =

Wales international rugby league footballer

Personal information
- Full name: Harold Box
- Born: c. 1952 Castleford, England

Playing information
- Position: Fullback
Club
Years	Team	Pld	T	G	FG	P
1970–80	Featherstone Rovers	283	57	476	0	1123
1980–85	Wakefield Trinity	132	20	59	10	191
	Total	415	77	535	10	1314
Representative
Years	Team	Pld	T	G	FG	P
1979–81	Yorkshire	3	0	3	0	6
1975	Other Nationalities	2	0	4	0	8
1979–81	Wales	5	1	2	0	7

Harold Box (born c. 1952) is an English-born former professional rugby league footballer who played in the 1970s and 1980s. He played at representative level for Wales, Other Nationalities and Yorkshire, and at club level for Featherstone Rovers and Wakefield Trinity (captain), as a right-footed toe-end style (rather than round the corner style) goal-kicking fullback.

== Playing career ==
=== Featherstone Rovers ===
Harold Box made his début for Featherstone Rovers on Saturday 17 January 1970.

Box played fullback in Featherstone Rovers' 9–24 defeat by Warrington in the 1974 Challenge Cup Final during the 1973–74 season at Wembley Stadium, London on Saturday 11 May 1974, in front of a crowd of 77,400.

Box played fullback in Featherstone Rovers' 12–16 defeat by Leeds in the 1976 Yorkshire Cup Final during the 1976–77 season at Headingley, Leeds on Saturday 16 October 1976.

Box's testimonial match at Featherstone Rovers took place against Wales on Sunday 11 May 1980.

=== Wakefield Trinity ===
In September 1980, Box was signed by Wakefield Trinity for a fee of £18,000.

He made his début for Wakefield Trinity in the 16–14 victory over St. Helens at Knowsley Road, St Helens, Merseyside on Sunday 14 September 1980, he later broke his arm in a victory over Halifax, during his time at Wakefield Trinity he scored seventeen 3-point tries and, three 4-point tries.

=== Representative honours ===
Harold Box won five caps for Wales in 1979–1981 while at Featherstone Rovers.

Box also won caps for Yorkshire while at Featherstone Rovers; during the 1979–80 season against Cumbria and Lancashire, and won caps for Yorkshire while at Wakefield Trinity.

== Honoured at Featherstone Rovers ==
Harold Box is a Featherstone Rovers Hall of Fame inductee.

== Outside of rugby league ==
Harold Box was the landlady of Featherstone The Last Orders.
