= 1974–75 Challenge Cup =

Rugby league competition

- Duration: 5 Rounds
- Number of teams: 32
- Highest attendance: 85,098
- Broadcast partners: BBC
- Winners: Widnes
- Runners-up: Warrington
- Lance Todd Trophy: Ray Dutton

The 1974–75 Challenge Cup was the 74th staging of rugby league's oldest knockout competition, the Challenge Cup. The final was contested by Widnes and Warrington at Wembley.

Widnes beat Warrington 14–7 at Wembley in front of a crowd of 85,098.

The winner of the Lance Todd Trophy was Widnes fullback, Ray Dutton.

This was Widnes’ fourth Cup final win in sixth Final appearances.

== First round ==
| Date | Team one | Team two | Score |
|---|---|---|---|
| 08 Feb | Castleford | Bradford Northern | 13-13 |
| 08 Feb | Dewsbury Celtic | Hull Kingston Rovers | 15-31 |
| 08 Feb | New Hunslet | Mayfield | 9-5 |
| 08 Feb | Whitehaven | Leeds | 7-16 |
| 08 Feb | Wigan | Dewsbury | 33-2 |
| 09 Feb | Barrow | Workington Town | 5-5 |
| 09 Feb - replay | Bradford Northern | Castleford | 10-7 |
| 09 Feb | Bramley | St Helens | 5-30 |
| 09 Feb | Featherstone Rovers | Salford | 7-17 |
| 09 Feb | Huddersfield | Rochdale Hornets | 18-21 |
| 09 Feb | Hull FC | Batley | 20-0 |
| 09 Feb | Leigh | Doncaster | 36-3 |
| 09 Feb | Oldham | Blackpool | 12-3 |
| 09 Feb | Swinton | Widnes | 4-13 |
| 09 Feb | Wakefield Trinity | Huyton | 33-5 |
| 09 Feb | Warrington | Halifax | 32-6 |
| 09 Feb | York | Keighley | 26-9 |
| 12 Feb -replay | Workington Town | Barrow | 14-3 |

== Second round ==
| Date | Team one | Team two | Score |
|---|---|---|---|
| 22 Feb | Wakefield Trinity | St Helens | 13-9 |
| 23 Feb | Hull FC | Widnes | 12-13 |
| 23 Feb | Hull Kingston Rovers | Workington Town | 19-7 |
| 23 Feb | Leigh | Bradford Northern | 5-23 |
| 23 Feb | New Hunslet | York | 16-9 |
| 23 Feb | Rochdale Hornets | Oldham | 10-10 |
| 23 Feb | Salford | Leeds | 12-17 |
| 23 Feb | Wigan | Warrington | 17-24 |
| 26 Feb - replay | Oldham | Rochdale Hornets | 15-3 |

== Quarter-finals ==
| Date | Team one | Team two | Score |
|---|---|---|---|
| 08 Mar | Leeds | Bradford Northern | 22-6 |
| 09 Mar | New Hunslet | Warrington | 3-23 |
| 09 Mar | Oldham | Widnes | 4-10 |
| 09 Mar | Wakefield Trinity | Hull Kingston Rovers | 27-10 |

== Semi-finals ==
| Date | Team one | Team two | Score |
|---|---|---|---|
| 22 Mar | Warrington | Leeds | 11-4 |
| 05 Apr | Wakefield Trinity | Widnes | 7-13 |

== Final ==
10 May 1975

| Widnes | 14 – 7 | Warrington |
|---|---|---|
| Try: Mills; Goal: Dutton (5); Drop goal: Dutton | Report | Try: Bevan; Goal: Whitehead (2) |

Wembley, London
Attendance: 85,098
Referee: P. Geraghty (York)
Player of the Match: Ray Dutton

| FB | 1 | Ray Dutton |
| RW | 2 | Alan Prescott |
| RC | 3 | Mick George |
| LC | 4 | Mal Aspey |
| LW | 5 | Chris Anderson |
| SO | 6 | Eric Hughes |
| SH | 7 | Reg Bowden |
| PR | 8 | Jim Mills |
| HK | 9 | Keith Elwell |
| PR | 10 | Barry Sheridan |
| SR | 11 | John Foran |
| SR | 12 | Mick Adams |
| LF | 13 | Doug Laughton (c) |
Substitutes (not used):
| IC | 14 | Terry Karalius |
| IC | 15 | Nick Nelson |
Coach:
Vince Karalius

| FB | 1 | Derek Whitehead |
| RW | 2 | Mike Philbin |
| RC | 3 | Derek Noonan |
| LC | 4 | Frank Reynolds | (substituted off) 38' |
| LW | 5 | John Bevan |
| SO | 6 | Alan Whittle |
| SH | 7 | Parry Gordon |
| PR | 8 | Dave Chisnall (c) |
| HK | 9 | Kevin Ashcroft |
| PR | 10 | Bobby Wanbon |
| SR | 11 | Tommy Conroy |
| SR | 12 | Tommy Martyn | (substituted off) 45' |
| LF | 13 | Barry Philbin |
Substitutes:
| IC | 14 | Wilf Briggs | (substituted on) 38' |
| IC | 15 | Mike Nicholas | (substituted on) 45' |
Coach:
Alex Murphy
