= St Gregory's Catholic High School =

Coordinates: 53.391°N 2.621°W

St. Gregory's Catholic High School

Location
- Cromwell Avenue; Cheshire, WA5 1HG

Information
- Type: Voluntary aided Comprehensive
- Motto: One family, inspired to learn
- Religious affiliation: Roman Catholic
- Patron saint: Pope Gregory I
- Established: September 1981
- Local authority: Warrington
- Department for Education URN: 111454 Tables
- Head teacher: Mr Edward McGlinchey
- Gender: Coeducational
- Age: 11 to 16
- Enrolment: 1206
- Colors: Navy Blue and Yellow
- Website: www.stgregoryshigh.com
- Last updated: 2026-06-20

St Gregory's Catholic High School is a Roman Catholic co-educational voluntary aided comprehensive school that educates approximately 1200 children between 11 and 16 years of age as of . The school is located in Great Sankey, Warrington, Cheshire, England. In February 2005 until the end of the progamme in 2011, it became a specialist humanities college under the specialist school programme along with many other schools in Warrington.

== History ==
The school first opened its doors to students in September 1981, with its first Headteacher being former rugby player Tom Brophy. He would serve in this role until his retirement in 2000. Stephen Clarke was appointed as headteacher in September 2000 following Brophy's retirement.

In 2009, The school formed a hard federation with Cardinal Newman Catholic High School, meaning that both schools would share a governing body as well as an executive headteacher, Stephen Clarke. This was later dissolved in 2014, with Cardinal Newman gaining its own governing body in May of that year.

In April 2013, David Lewis was appointed as executive headteacher due to the retirement of Clarke.
