= 1973–74 Challenge Cup =

Rugby league competition

- Highest attendance: 77,400
- Broadcast partners: BBC
- Winners: Warrington
- Runners-up: Featherstone Rovers
- Lance Todd Trophy: Derek Whitehead

The 1973–74 Challenge Cup was the 73rd staging of rugby league's oldest knockout competition, the Challenge Cup.

The final was contested by Warrington and Featherstone Rovers at Wembley.

Warrington beat Featherstone Rovers 24-9 at Wembley in front of a crowd of 77,400.

The winner of the Lance Todd Trophy was the Warrington fullback, Derek Whitehead.

Warrington defeated Huddersfield, Huyton, Wigan and Dewsbury to get to the final against Featherstone Rovers.

This was Warrington’s fourth Cup final win in ten Final appearances.

Warrington's full-back Derek Whitehead won the Lance Todd Trophy for man-of-the-match.

== First round ==
Date	Team one	Team two	Score
02 Feb	Barrow	Featherstone Rovers	3-11
02 Feb	Lock Lane	Wigan	9-37
02 Feb	Workington Town	York	14-4
03 Feb	Batley	Leeds	7-18
03 Feb	Castleford	Bradford Northern	4-15
03 Feb	Dewsbury	New Hunslet	13-4
03 Feb	Hull FC	Hull Kingston Rovers	2-13
03 Feb	Huyton	Doncaster	16-2
03 Feb	Leigh	Kippax White Swan	63-7
03 Feb	Rochdale Hornets	Halifax	13-6
03 Feb	St Helens	Keighley	27-5
03 Feb	Salford	Oldham	26-12
03 Feb	Swinton	Blackpool	19-8
03 Feb	Warrington	Huddersfield	34-4
03 Feb	Whitehaven	Bramley	5-8
03 Feb	Widnes	Wakefield Trinity	27-7

== Second round ==
Date	Team one	Team two	Score
23 Feb	Leeds	Salford	10-6
24 Feb	Leigh	Widnes	11-7
24 Feb	Rochdale Hornets	Wigan	8-25
24 Feb	St Helens	Bramley	10-5
24 Feb	Swinton	Bradford Northern	10-19
24 Feb	Warrington	Huyton	21-6
24 Feb	Workington Town	Dewsbury	4-14
26 Feb	Hull Kingston Rovers	Featherstone Rovers	9-12

== Quarter-finals ==
Date	Team one	Team two	Score
10 Mar	Bradford Northern	Featherstone Rovers	0-5
10 Mar	Dewsbury	Leeds	9-2
10 Mar	Leigh	St Helens	11-5
10 Mar	Wigan	Warrington	6-10

== Semi-finals ==
Date	Team one	Team two	Score
23 Mar	Warrington	Dewsbury	17-7
30 Mar	Featherstone Rovers	Leigh	21-14

== Final ==
11 May 1974

Warrington	24 – 9	Featherstone Rovers
Try: Ashcroft, Nicholas; Goal: Whitehead (7); Drop goal: Murphy (2)	Report	Try: Newlove; Goal: Box (3)

Wembley, London
Attendance: 77,400
Referee: S. Shepherd (Oldham)
Player of the Match: Derek Whitehead

1	Derek Whitehead
2	Mike Philbin
3	Derek Noonan
4	Alan Whittle
5	John Bevan
6	Alex Murphy (c) (substituted off)
7	Parry Gordon
8	David Chisnall
9	Kevin Ashcroft
10	Bobby Wanbon (substituted off)
11	Mike Nicholas
12	Dave Wright
13	Barry Philbin
Substitutes:
14	Billy Pickup (substituted in)
15	Brian Brady (substituted in)
Coach:
Alex Murphy

1	Harold Box
2	Dave Dyas
3	Michael Smith
4	Dave Hartley
5	Graham Bray
6	John Newlove (c)
7	Steve Nash
8	Les Tonks
9	John Keith Bridges
10	Billy Harris
11	Alan Rhodes (substituted off)
12	Jimmy Thompson (substituted off)
13	Keith Bell
Substitutes:
14	David Busfield (substituted in)
15	Charlie Stone (substituted in)
Coach:
Peter Fox
