= Keith Bell (rugby league, born 1953) =

English rugby league footballer

Personal information
- Born: 25 September 1953 (age 71); Wakefield district, England

Playing information
- Position: Hooker, Second-row, Loose forward
Club
Years	Team	Pld	T	G	FG	P
1971–90	Featherstone Rovers	417	57	7	67	265
1990–93	Hunslet
	Total	417	57	7	67	265
Representative
Years	Team	Pld	T	G	FG	P
1977–81	Yorkshire	4	0	0	0	0
1977	Great Britain U-24	2	1	0	0	3

Keith Bell (born 25 September 1953) is an English former professional rugby league footballer who played in the 1970s, 1980s and 1990s, and coached. He played at representative level for Yorkshire, and at club level for Featherstone Rovers (captain), and Hunslet, as an occasional goal-kicking hooker, second-row, or loose forward, and coached at club level for the Featherstone Lions.

== Background ==
Keith Bell's birth was registered in Wakefield district, West Riding of Yorkshire, England.

== Playing career ==
=== County honours ===
Keith Bell won 4-caps for Yorkshire while at Featherstone Rovers; during the 1977–78 season against Cumbria and Lancashire, during the 1979–80 season against Cumbria, and during the 1981–82 season against Cumbria.

=== Challenge Cup Final appearances ===
Keith Bell played loose forward in Featherstone Rovers' 9–24 defeat by Warrington in the 1974 Challenge Cup Final during the 1973–74 season at Wembley Stadium, London on Saturday 11 May 1974, in front of a crowd of 77,400.

=== County Cup Final appearances ===
Keith Bell played loose forward (replaced by substitute Johnny Spells) in Featherstone Rovers' 12–16 defeat by Leeds in the 1976 Yorkshire Cup Final during the 1976–77 season, at Headingley, Leeds on Saturday 16 October 1976, and played loose forward in the 7–17 defeat by Castleford in the 1977 Yorkshire Cup Final during the 1977–78 season, at Headingley, Leeds on Saturday 15 October 1977.

=== Club career ===
Keith Bell made his début for Featherstone Rovers on Sunday 28 November 1971, during his time at Featherstone Rovers he scored forty-four 3-point tries, and thirteen 4-point tries, and he played his last match for Featherstone Rovers during the 1989–90 season.

=== Testimonial match ===
Keith Bell's benefit season/testimonial match at Featherstone Rovers took place during the 1984–85 season.

== Honoured at Featherstone Rovers ==
Keith Bell is a Featherstone Rovers Hall of Fame Inductee.

== Personal life ==
Keith Bell is the son of the rugby league stand-off for Featherstone Rovers Jimmy Bell. His three older brothers, Roy Bell, Peter Bell and John Bell, also all played for Featherstone Rovers.
