= David Wright (rugby league) =

Australian RL coach and former Australia international rugby league footballer

Personal information
- Born: 16 March 1951 (age 74) Queensland

Playing information
- Position: Lock
Club
Years	Team	Pld	T	G	FG	P
19??–77	Brothers
1973–74	Warrington	24	3	0	0	9
	Total	24	3	0	0	9
Representative
Years	Team	Pld	T	G	FG	P
1973–76	Queensland	11	0	0	0	0
1975	Australia	1	0	0	0	0

David Wright (born 16 March 1951) was an Australian professional rugby league footballer of the 1970s. A Queensland state and Australia national representative forward, he played in the Brisbane Rugby League for the Brothers club and in England's Northern Rugby Football League for the Warrington club.

Wright was born on 16 March 1951. He started playing football in the Brisbane Rugby League with the Brothers club. In July 1973 Wright was first selected to play for Queensland in the series against New South Wales. After then winning Channel 7’s best player award for the 1973 season he earned an off-season stint with English club, Warrington, becoming player number 748. In February 1974 Wright played in Warrington's victory in the 1973–74 League Cup Final. In May 1974 Wright played at Wembley Stadium in London for Warrington in the final of the 1973–74 Challenge Cup, in which they defeated Featherstone Rovers 24-9. After Wembley, he was to come back to the Brisbane Rugby League to play the rest of the 1974 BRL season with Brothers, who had a new boss, Paul Broughton. During the 1974 Great Britain Lions tour, Wright was seleted to play for both the Brisbane and the Queensland sides to play the British national team.

In January 1975 Wright played in Warrington's victory in the final of the 1974–75 BBC2 Floodlit Trophy. In June 1975 while still playing for Brothers Wright was first selected to play for the Australian national team in the 1975 Rugby League World Cup against New Zealand, becoming Kangaroo No. 484. In 1976 Wright was selected in all three of Queensland's matches against New South Wales.
