= 1973–74 Northern Rugby Football League season =

1973–74 Rugby Football League season
- League: Championship

First Division
- Champions: Salford
- Runners-up: St Helens
- Club Championship: Warrington
- Top point-scorer(s): David Watkins 438
- Top try-scorer(s): Keith Fielding 49

Promotion and relegation
- Relegated to Second Division: Oldham; Hull Kingston Rovers; Leigh; Whitehaven

Second Division
- Champions: Bradford Northern
- Promoted to First Division: Bradford Northern; York; Keighley; Halifax

The 1973–74 Rugby Football League season was the 79th season of rugby league football.

== Season summary ==
1973-1974 saw two division rugby re-introduced. The Championship playoffs were discontinued and the league leaders were declared the champions. A "Club Championship" was played in place of the playoffs but this was a one-off precursor to what became the end of season Premiership. It was a complicated format that involved sides from both divisions.

On 25 April, David Watkins of Salford scored the last of 929 points (41 tries, 403 goals) in a record run of scoring in 92 consecutive games for one club.

Keith Mumby made his début for Bradford Northern this season as the club's youngest ever player, aged 16. In a match against Doncaster this season he scored 12 goals and a try. He went on to become the club's record appearance holder, playing 576 games.

Salford won their fifth Championship. Oldham, Hull Kingston Rovers, Leigh and Whitehaven were demoted to the Second Division.

The Challenge Cup winners were Warrington who beat Featherstone Rovers 24-9 in the final.

The Club Championship was won by Warrington who beat St. Helens 13-12 in the final.

2nd Division Champions were: Bradford Northern, and they York, Keighley and Halifax were promoted to the First Division.

== League Tables ==
=== Championship ===
	Team	Pld	W	D	L	PF	PA	Pts
1	Salford	30	23	1	6	632	299	47
2	St. Helens	30	22	2	6	595	263	46
3	Leeds	30	20	1	9	554	378	41
4	Widnes	30	18	1	11	431	329	37
5	Warrington	30	16	1	13	414	368	33
6	Dewsbury	30	16	1	13	389	474	33
7	Wakefield Trinity	30	16	0	14	470	411	32
8	Featherstone Rovers	30	14	2	14	443	397	30
9	Castleford	30	12	4	14	420	411	28
10	Rochdale Hornets	30	13	2	15	379	415	28
11	Wigan	30	12	3	15	427	364	27
12	Bramley	30	11	3	16	344	457	25
13	Oldham	30	12	1	17	341	494	25
14	Hull Kingston Rovers	30	9	2	19	428	552	20
15	Leigh	30	7	0	23	326	655	14
16	Whitehaven	30	7	0	23	308	634	14

=== Second Division ===
	Team	Pld	W	D	L	PF	PA	Pts
1	Bradford Northern	26	24	0	2	607	221	48
2	York	26	21	0	5	429	219	42
3	Keighley	26	20	0	6	439	250	40
4	Halifax	26	18	0	8	460	298	36
5	Workington Town	26	17	0	9	421	310	34
6	Hull	26	16	0	10	465	256	32
7	Swinton	26	15	0	11	405	276	30
8	Batley	26	12	0	14	286	311	24
9	Barrow	26	11	0	15	214	291	22
10	Huddersfield	26	9	0	17	363	394	18
11	New Hunslet	26	7	0	19	272	418	14
12	Blackpool Borough	26	7	0	19	272	585	14
13	Doncaster	26	3	0	23	158	684	6
14	Huyton	26	2	0	24	182	460	4

Champions	Promoted	Relegated

== Cups ==
=== Challenge Cup ===
Warrington defeated Huddersfield, Huyton, Wigan and Dewsbury to reach the final against Featherstone Rovers. Captained by Alex Murphy, Warrington beat Featherstone Rovers 24-9 in the final played at Wembley in front of a crowd of 77,400.

This was Warrington’s fourth Cup Final win in ten Final appearances. Derek Whitehead, Warrington's full-back won the Lance Todd Trophy for man-of-the-match.

=== Player's No.6 Trophy ===
The Player's No.6 Trophy winners were Warrington who beat Rochdale Hornets 24-17 in the final.

=== County Cups ===
Wigan beat Salford 19–9 to win the Lancashire County Cup, and Leeds beat Wakefield Trinity 7–2 to win the Yorkshire County Cup.

=== BBC2 Floodlit Trophy ===
BBC2 Floodlit Trophy winners were Bramley who beat Widnes 15-7 in the final.

== Kangaroo Tour ==
From September until December also saw the appearance of the Australian team in England on their 1973 Kangaroo Tour. Other than the three test Ashes series against Great Britain (won 2–1 by Australia), The Kangaroos played matches against club and county representative sides

The 1978 Kangaroos were captain-coached by champion St George Dragons fullback Graeme Langlands who was making his third tour following from 1963–64 and 1967–68

game	Date	Result	Venue	Attendance
1	30 September	Australia def. Salford 15–12	The Willows, Salford	11,064
2	3 October	Australia def. Wakefield Trinity 13–9	Belle Vue, Wakefield	5,863
3	7 October	Australia def. Dewsbury 17–3	Crown Flatt, Dewsbury	5,865
4	10 October	Australia def. Castleford 18–10	Wheldon Road, Castleford	2,419
5	14 October	Australia def. Widnes 25–10	Naughton Park, Widnes	5,185
6	19 October	Australia def. Oldham 44–10	The Watersheddings, Oldham	2,895
7	24 October	Australia def. (Cumbria) Cumberland 28–2	Recreation Ground, Whitehaven	3,666
8	28 October	Australia def. Bradford Northern 50–14	Odsal Stadium, Bradford	5,667
9	3 November	Great Britain def. Australia 21–12	Wembley Stadium, London	9,874
10	7 November	Australia def. Hull Kingston Rovers 32–2	Craven Park, Hull	5,150
11	10 November	Australia def. Huddersfield 25–9	Fartown Ground, Huddersfield	1,333
12	11 November	Australia def. Leigh 31–4	Hilton Park, Leigh	2,607
13	13 November	St. Helens def. Australia 11–7	Knowsley Road, St Helens	10,013
14	18 November	Australia def. Featherstone Rovers 18–3	Post Office Road, Featherstone	5,659
15	24 November	Australia def. Great Britain 14–6	Headingley, Leeds	16,674
16	1 December	Australia def. Great Britain 15–5	Wilderspool Stadium, Warrington	10,019
