= 1974–75 Northern Rugby Football League season =

1974–75 Rugby Football League season
- League: Championship
- Champions: St. Helens
- Premiership: Leeds
- Top point-scorer(s): Neil Fox (333)
- Top try-scorer(s): Gerald Dunn (42)

Promotion and relegation
- Promoted from Second Division: Huddersfield; Hull Kingston Rovers; Oldham; Swinton
- Relegated to Second Division: York; Bramley; Rochdale Hornets; Halifax

The 1974–75 Rugby Football League season was the 80th season of competition between the clubs of England's Northern Rugby Football League. The season's First Division Championship featured 16 clubs and was won by St. Helens. The Challenge Cup was won by Widnes.

== Rule change ==
- Drop goals became worth one point. Drops had previously been worth two points.

== Season summary ==
St. Helens won their seventh Championship. York, Bramley, Rochdale Hornets and Halifax were demoted to the Second Division.

The Challenge Cup Winners were Widnes who beat Warrington 14–7 in the final.

2nd Division Champions were Huddersfield, and they, Hull Kingston Rovers, Oldham and Swinton were promoted to the First Division.

== League Tables ==
=== First Division Championship ===
	Team	Pld	W	D	L	PF	PA	Pts
1	St. Helens	30	26	1	3	561	229	53
2	Wigan	30	21	0	9	517	341	42
3	Leeds	30	19	1	10	581	359	39
4	Featherstone Rovers	30	19	1	10	431	339	39
5	Widnes	30	18	1	11	382	305	37
6	Warrington	30	17	1	12	428	356	35
7	Bradford	30	16	1	13	393	376	33
8	Castleford	30	14	3	13	393	376	31
9	Salford	30	14	1	15	451	351	29
10	Wakefield Trinity	30	12	5	13	440	419	29
11	Keighley	30	13	0	17	300	424	26
12	Dewsbury	30	11	0	19	350	506	22
13	York	30	10	0	20	359	498	20
14	Bramley	30	9	0	21	338	493	18
15	Rochdale Hornets	30	8	0	22	219	400	16
16	Halifax	30	5	1	24	269	676	11

=== Second Division Championship ===
	Team	Pld	W	D	L	PF	PA	Pts
1	Huddersfield	26	21	0	5	489	213	42
2	Hull Kingston Rovers	26	20	1	5	628	249	41
3	Oldham	26	19	0	7	406	223	38
4	Swinton	26	17	1	8	399	254	35
5	Workington Town	26	16	0	10	371	275	32
6	Whitehaven	26	14	1	11	285	234	29
7	Huyton	26	12	2	12	301	291	26
8	Hull	26	12	1	13	344	309	25
9	Barrow	26	11	2	13	338	315	24
10	Leigh	26	11	1	14	302	348	23
11	New Hunslet	26	10	2	14	309	384	22
12	Blackpool Borough	26	7	1	18	261	417	15
13	Batley	26	4	1	21	197	520	9
14	Doncaster	26	1	1	24	147	745	3

Champions	Promoted	Relegated

== Cups ==
=== Challenge Cup ===
Widnes beat Warrington 14–7 in the final played at Wembley in front of a crowd of 85,998.

This was Widnes’ fourth Cup Final win in sixth Final appearances.

=== Player's No.6 Trophy ===
Players No.6 Trophy Winners were Bradford Northern who beat Widnes 3–2 in the final.

=== Premiership ===
Rugby League Premiership Trophy Winners were Leeds who beat St. Helens 26–11 in the final.

=== County cups ===
Widnes beat Salford 6–2 to win the Lancashire County Cup, and Hull Kingston Rovers beat Wakefield Trinity 16–13 to win the Yorkshire County Cup.

=== BBC2 Floodlit Trophy ===
BBC2 Floodlit Trophy Winners were Salford who beat Warrington 10–5 in a replay after a 0–0 draw in the final.

== Sources ==
- 1974-75 Rugby Football League season at wigan.rlfans.com
- The Challenge Cup at The Rugby Football League website
