= The Willows, Salford =

Rugby league stadium in Weaste, Salford, England

The Willows
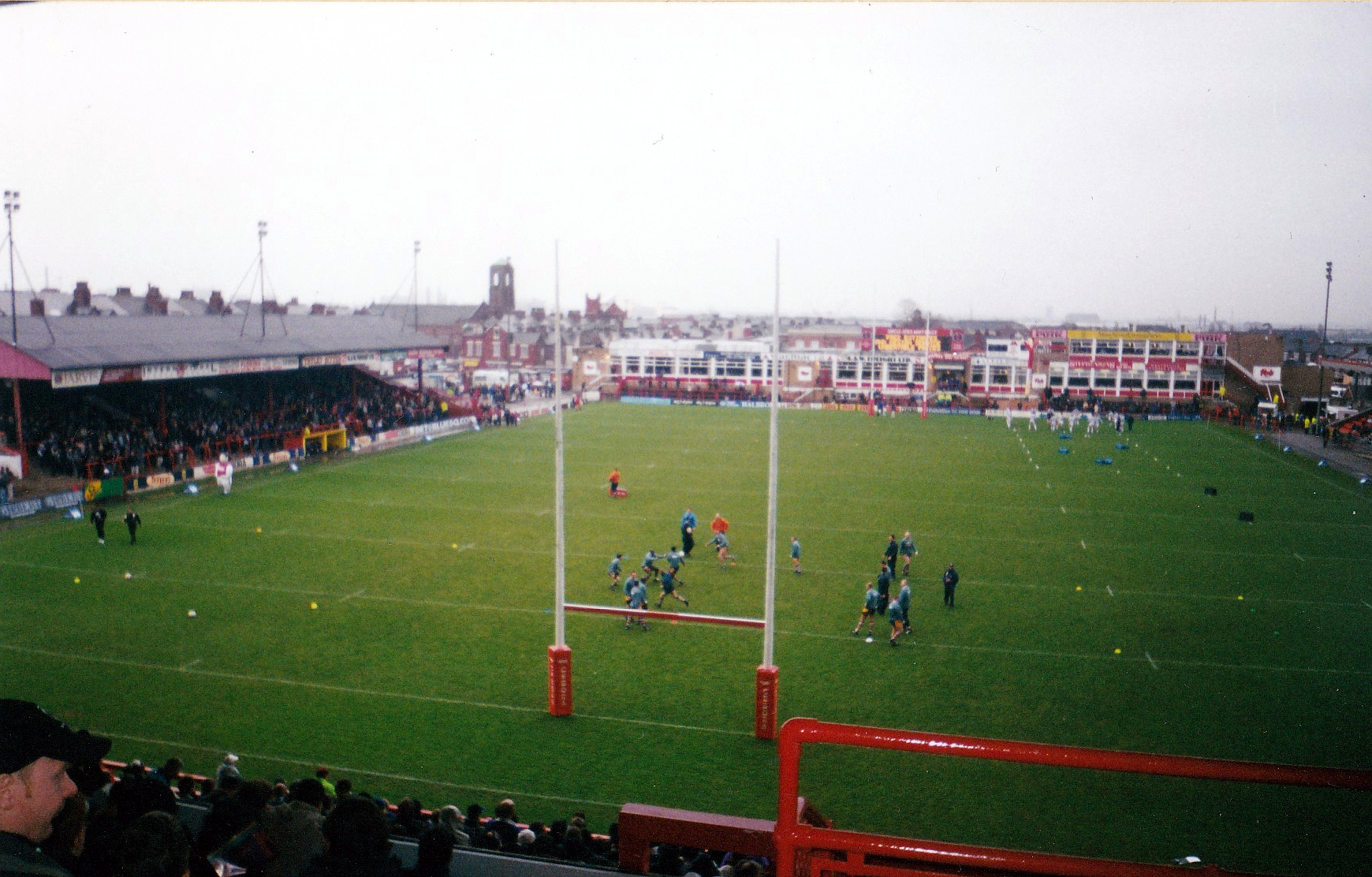
- Interactive map of The Willows
- Full name: The Willows
- Location: Willows Road, Weaste, Salford; M5 5FQ
- Coordinates: 53°29′11″N 2°18′34″W
- Owner: Iain Watson
- Capacity: 11,363 with 2,500 seats
- Surface: Grass
- Scoreboard: Electronic
- Record attendance: 26,470 vs Warrington (Challenge Cup), 13 February 1937

Construction
- Built: 1900
- Opened: 1901
- Renovated: 1966, 1971, 1975, 1989
- Closed: 2011
- Demolished: 2012

Tenants
- Salford RLFC (1901–2011); Salford United (1906–1936); Swinton RLFC (2011)

The Willows was a rugby league stadium in Weaste, Salford, England. It had a final capacity of 11,363 with 2,500 seats.

== History ==
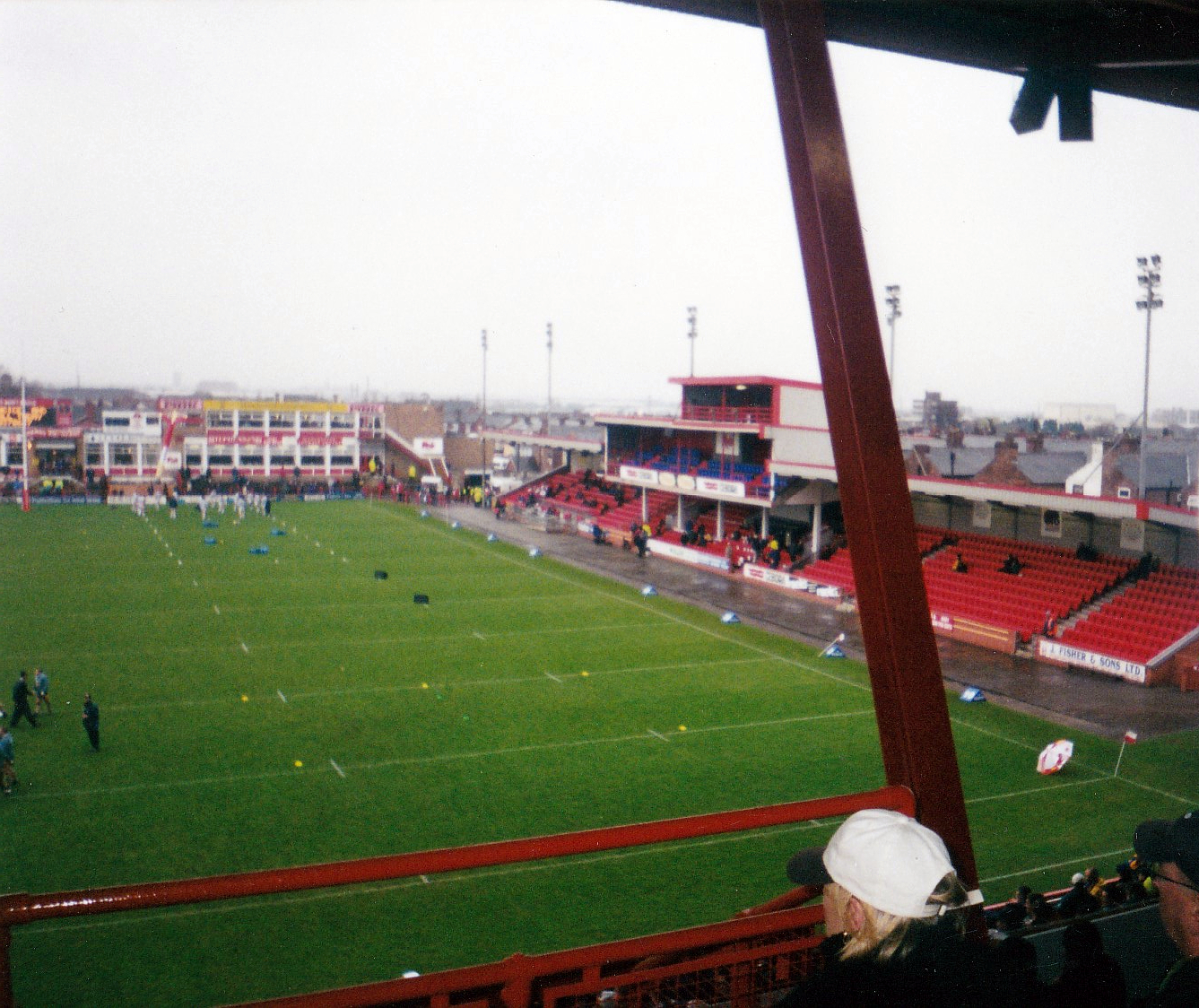
Pre Match in 2001 at the Willows

In 1900, Salford agreed a 14-year lease on 5 acres (20,000 m^{2}) of land belonging to the Willows Estate Company, named after the abundance of willow trees in the area. They made their debut at the Willows on 21 December 1901, beating Swinton 2–0 in front of 16,981 fans.

In the 1960s, the terrace was flattened at the Willows Road end to make way for the Salford Football and Social Club which was officially opened on 16 June 1966.

The Willows switched on its floodlights for the first time in the match with Widnes on Friday 11 March 1966. On 26 November 1989, Salford unveiled a new £50,000 electronic scoreboard above the Willows Variety Centre.

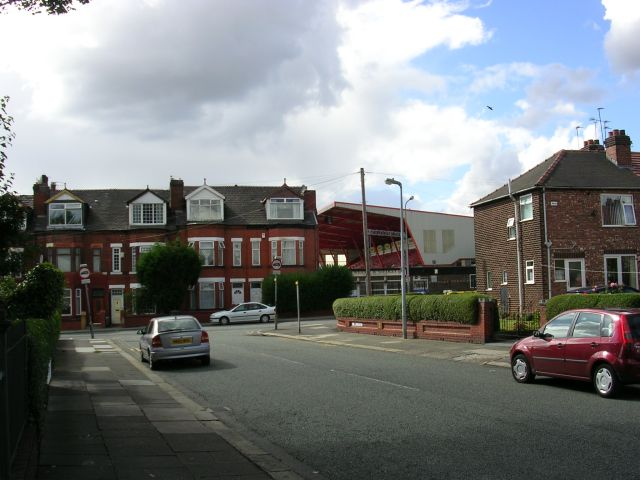
The North Stand in 2005

Salford City Reds moved to the Salford City Stadium in Barton-upon-Irwell at the start of the 2012 season. The last match at the Willows saw them lose to the Catalans Dragons 18–44 in front of 10,146 fans, a record for a Salford City Reds home match in the Super League.

== Rugby League Test matches ==
List of international rugby league matches played at The Willows.

Game#	Date	Result	Attendance	Notes
1	14 January 1922	Great Britain def. Australia 6–0	22,000	1921–22 Ashes series
2	27 January 1932	England def. Wales 19–2	8,000	
3	7 November 1968	Wales def. England 24–17	6,002	
4	23 October 1969	Wales def. France 8–2	6,189	1969–70 European Rugby League Championship
5	25 September 1971	New Zealand def. Great Britain 25–24	8,083	1971 Great Britain vs New Zealand series
6	25 January 1975	England def. Wales 12–8	8,494	1975 European Rugby League Championship
7	6 November 1975	Wales def. France 23–2	2,247	1975 Rugby League World Cup

== Rugby League Tour Matches ==
The Willows also saw Salford and the county team Lancashire play host to various international touring teams from 1908 to 1978.

Game	Date	Result	Attendance	Notes
1	28 December 1907	New Zealand def. Salford 9–2	12,000	1907–08 All Golds tour
2	17 October 1908	Salford drew with Australia 9–9	6,100	1908–09 Kangaroo tour
3	30 December 1911	Australasia def. Salford 6–3	4,000	1911–12 Kangaroo tour
4	29 October 1921	Australasia def. Salford 48–3	9,000	1921–22 Kangaroo tour
5	3 November 1926	New Zealand def. Salford 18–10	3,500	1926–27 New Zealand Kiwis tour
6	11 January 1930	Australia def. Salford 21–5	8,000	1929–30 Kangaroo tour
7	21 October 1933	Salford def. Australia 16–9	15,761	1933–34 Kangaroo tour
8	30 October 1937	Salford def. Australia 11–8	12,000	1937–38 Kangaroo tour
9	30 October 1948	Australia def. Salford 13–2	16,627	1948–49 Kangaroo tour
10	26 September 1959	Australia def. Salford 22–20	11,008	1959–60 Kangaroo tour
11	11 October 1967	Australia def. Lancashire 16–7	9,369	1967–68 Kangaroo tour
12	30 September 1973	Australia def. Salford 15–12	11,064	1973 Kangaroo tour
13	10 October 1975	Australia def. Salford 44–6	5,357	1975 Australian Rugby League World Cup tour
14	14 November 1978	Australia def. Salford 14–2	6,155	1978 Kangaroo tour

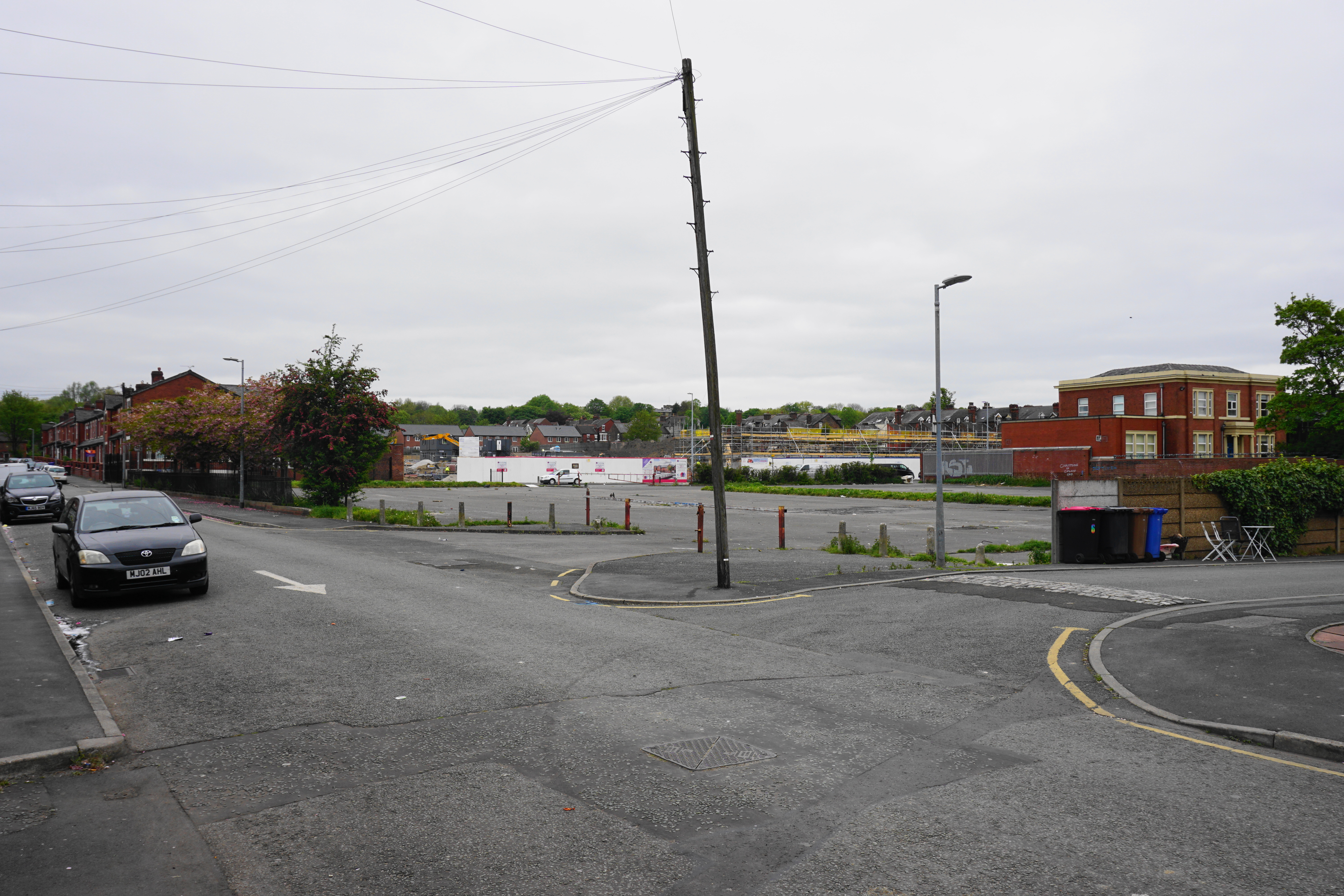
The Willows site before houses were built in its place

== Redevelopment ==
In 2013, a proposal to redevelop the site for housing was put forward by City West Housing Trust.

Preceded by Headingley; Leeds	Challenge Cup; Final Venue; 1902–03	Succeeded by Headingley; Leeds
Preceded by Fartown; Huddersfield	Challenge Cup; Final Venue; 1910–11	Succeeded by Headingley; Leeds
Preceded by New Barnes; 1878–1901	Salford Red Devils; Home Ground; 1901–2011	Succeeded by Salford City Stadium; 2012–present
