= Wilderspool Stadium =

Rugby League stadium in Warrington, England

Wilderspool
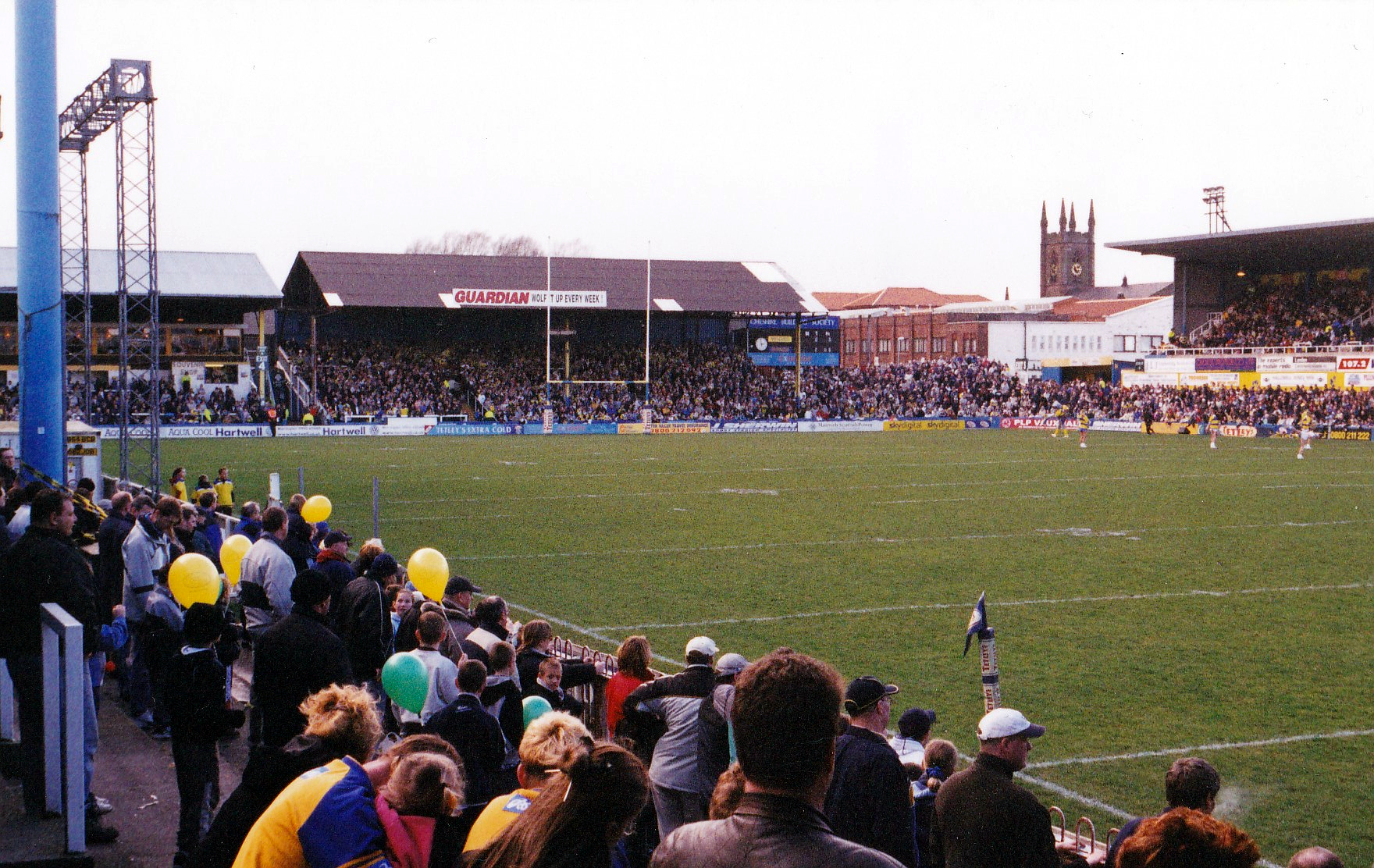
- Interactive map of Wilderspool
- Full name: Wilderspool Stadium
- Location: Fletcher Street, Warrington
- Coordinates: 53°22′57″N 2°35′17″W
- Owner: Warrington Borough Council
- Operator: Warrington Wolves
- Capacity: 9,200 (900 seating)
- Surface: Grass
- Scoreboard: Manual

Construction
- Built: 1881
- Opened: 1881
- Renovated: 1888
- Expanded: 1983, 2000
- Closed: 2014
- Demolished: 2014

Tenants
- Warrington Wolves (1898–2003); Warrington Wizards (2003–2012)

Wilderspool Stadium was a rugby league stadium in Warrington, England. The ground was Warrington RLFC's old ground before moving to the Halliwell Jones Stadium.

== History ==
In 1898, Warrington RLFC moved to the Wilderspool Stadium. A 10-year lease was agreed with Greenall Whitley for land on the east side of their previous ground, a pitch previously used by Latchford Rovers Rugby Club. Warrington's previous pitch was used to build houses in Fletcher Street.

Wilderspool Stadium was modernised and extended in the inter-war period, becoming one of the finest venues in rugby league, and being awarded host status for Championship finals, Challenge Cup semi-finals, and tour games. A new west perimeter wall and turnstiles were built at Wilderspool around 1921. In 1925 the supporters' club provided Warrington with covered accommodation on the popular side of the ground and two years later, they donated a scoreboard. In 1926, the perimeter wooden fence being replaced by a concrete wall. New dressing rooms underneath the main stand were opened in January 1934.

During the Second World War, Wilderspool was requisitioned for the war effort; being used as a storage depot.

The record Kangaroo Tour attendance at the stadium was on the 1948-9 tour when 26,879 saw Warrington defeat Australia 16-7.

Wilderspool's record attendance was created in the 1948-9 season when 34,304 spectators turned up to see Warrington lose only their second game of the season to Wigan.

In April, 1953, Wilderspool staged its first international, a match between Wales and Other Nationalities.

In 1958, the popular side terracing became fully covered and soon after the Fletcher Street End was given a roof.

In 1965, floodlights were installed at Wilderspool.

A stand was completely destroyed by arson in 1982. The Brian Bevan stand was built in 1983 to replace the one lost to arson.

During the 1994 Kangaroo tour, Australia defeated Warrington 24-0 at Wilderspool before a crowd of 11,244 in the Kangaroos' last game at the ground.

Warrington RLFC left Wilderspool for the Halliwell Jones Stadium in 2003. The final game was played in September 2003 with Warrington beating Wakefield 52–12.

The stadium was finally demolished between August and October 2014. A plan for 160 houses on the site was submitted in 2019, more than 16 years after the final game at Wilderspool.

The scoreboard from Wilderspool was restored and placed in Warrington's Victoria Park in 2017.

== Rugby League Test matches ==
List of Test and World Cup matches played at Wilderspool Stadium.

Game#	Date	Result	Attendance	Notes
1	15 April 1953	Wales def. Other Nationalities 18–16	8,449	1952–53 European Rugby League Championship
2	1 December 1973	Australia def. Great Britain 15–5	10,019	1973 Ashes series
3	20 September 1975	England def. Wales 22–16	5,034	1975 Rugby League World Cup
4	24 March 1979	England def. France 12–6	5,004	1979 European Rugby League Championship
5	8 October 1995	New Zealand def. Tonga 25–24	8,083	1995 Rugby League World Cup Group B
6	20 October 1995	Russia def. United States 28–26	1,950	1995 Rugby League Emerging Nations Tournament
7	16 November 2003	England def. France 68–6	2,536	2003 European Nations Cup

== Rugby League Tour Matches ==
Wilderspool also saw Warrington and the county team Lancashire play host to various international touring teams from 1907–1994.

Game	Date	Result	Attendance	Notes
1	21 December 1907	Warrington def. New Zealand 15–13	10,000	1907–08 All Golds tour
2	14 November 1908	Warrington def. Australia 10–3	5,000	1908–09 Kangaroo tour
3	8 February 1909	Warrington drew with Australia 8–8	7,000	1908–09 Kangaroo tour
4	30 December 1911	Australasia def. Warrington 34–6	8,500	1911–12 Kangaroo tour
5	29 October 1921	Warrington def. Australasia 10–3	16,000	1921–22 Kangaroo tour
6	14 December 1921	Lancashire def. Australasia 8–6	6,000	1921–22 Kangaroo tour
7	9 October 1926	Warrington def. New Zealand 17–5	5,000	1926–27 New Zealand Kiwis tour
8	26 September 1929	Australia def. Lancashire 29–14	24,000	1929–30 Kangaroo tour
9	21 December 1929	Warrington def. Australia 17–8	12,826	1929–30 Kangaroo tour
10	20 September 1933	Australia def. Lancashire 33–7	16,576	1933–34 Kangaroo tour
11	14 October 1933	Warrington def. Australia 15–12	16,431	1933–34 Kangaroo tour
12	17 March 1934	English League XIII def. France 32–16	11,100	1934 French rugby league tour
13	29 September 1937	Lancashire def. Australia 7–5	16,250	1937–38 Kangaroo tour
14	27 November 1937	Warrington def. Australia 8–6	12,637	1937–38 Kangaroo tour
15	30 October 1948	Warrington def. Australia 16–7	26,879	1948–49 Kangaroo tour
16	11 October 1952	Australia def. Warrington 34–10	21,478	1952–53 Kangaroo tour
17	19 November 1952	Australia def. Lancashire 36–11	5,863	1952–53 Kangaroo tour
18	27 October 1956	Warrington def. Australia 21–17	15,613	1956–57 Kangaroo tour
19	19 September 1959	Australia def. Warrington 30–24	17,112	1959–60 Kangaroo tour
20	14 September 1963	Australia def. Warrington 28–20	20,090	1963–64 Kangaroo tour
21	30 September 1967	Australia def. Warrington 16–7	11,642	1967–68 Kangaroo tour
22	11 October 1978	Warrington def. Australia 15–12	10,143	1978 Kangaroo tour
23	29 October 1980	Warrington def. New Zealand 11–7	5,680	1980 New Zealand Kiwis tour
24	31 October 1990	Australia def. Warrington 26–6	10,200	1990 Kangaroo tour
24	9 November 1994	Australia def. Warrington 24–0	11,244	1994 Kangaroo tour
