= Sean Power (actor) =

Irish actor and director (born 1974)

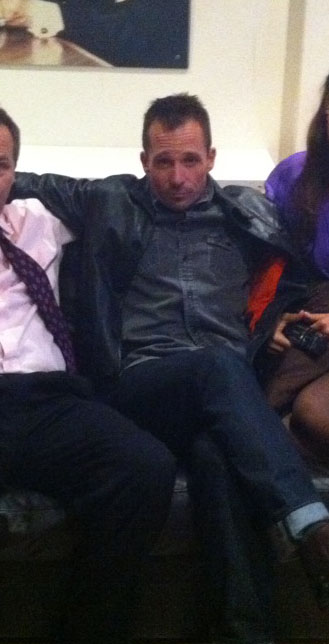
- Power in 2011
- Born: 1 November 1974 (age 51); Dublin, Ireland
- Occupations: Actor; playwright; stage director
- Years active: 1993–present
- Website: www.theseanpower.com

Sean Power (born 1 November 1974) is an actor, writer, and director. Known primarily for his role as Marty, in which he starred opposite Jack Dee in the BBC comedy series Lead Balloon.

== Early and personal life ==
Born to an Irish father and Italian mother, Power was raised in Canada, the U.S and Ireland. His family moved frequently every few years due to his father's work commitments, living in Chicago, Edmonton, Dublin, Ottawa, Montreal, New York settling eventually in Toronto, Ontario where he attended Lawrence Park Collegiate Institute. After Power's final year of high school he attended The National Theatre School of Canada. He trained there three years under the guidance of Pierre Lefebvre, Perry Schneiderman, Brigit Panet, Dame Peggy Ashcroft, George F. Walker, and Robert Lepage.

== Career ==
=== Theater ===
In high school, Power was active in the theatre, playing Felix in the publicly staged production of The Odd Couple in association with TVO. He was a recipient of a Sears Ontario Drama Festival Award for directing and acting in the two hander Babel Rap by John Lazarus, while simultaneously directing a performance art piece ‘Journey’ by fellow student Ian Rye. The next year Power's improv troupe competed in the regional finals of the Canadian Improv Games in Ottawa, where they came second. During this time, Power was a member of the Young Actors Performance Troupe that performed in community centers and nursing homes a variety of vaudevillian cabarets and contemporary youth plays.

==== 1992-1995 ====
Upon graduating from NTSC, Power was unable to secure an interview for the Stratford Shakespeare Festival, and so instead he ‘crashed’ the auditions. Power had his professional theatrical debut playing Demetrius in Joe Dowling's adaptation of Shakespeare’s A Midsummer Night's Dream on the mainstage of the Stratford Festival in Canada, acting alongside fellow NTSC alumni, Colm Feore. and Ted Dykstra. Power also performed that year in Albert Millard’s production of Molière’s The Imaginary Invalid with William Hutt. From 1993 onward, Power focused the development and production of new Canadian works, starring in Anne Szumigalski's productions ‘Z’ (25th Street Theatre), MollyWood (Lovers and Madmen) by Christopher Richards, Three Penny Epic Cabaret (Theatre Passe-Maurille/Bald Ego) by Adam Nashman.

==== 1995-2001 ====
Power landed the eponymous role of Jack in ‘’Stuck‘’ in David Rubinoff's one-man show based on the beat poets. The play Stuck brought Power to HERE theatre in New York where he soon moved to the Lower East Side and subsequently developed a solid working relationship with Ellen Stewart of La MaMa. While at La MaMa, Power starred in a number of productions, most notably the original and remount of Jews And Jesus by Oren Safdie. Also under Ellen Stewart he wrote and directed Lady/Speak/Easy, set in Harlem, and based on the life and music of Billie Holiday. The cast included musicians Bemshi Shearer (as Lady Day), bass player Theo Wilson (son of Billie's piano player Teddy Wilson), Jeremy Pelt on Trumpet, Ed Swanston (ex- piano for Louis Armstrong), Kalil Madi (ex-drummer for Billie Holiday) and Michael 'Smallchange' Johnson(Lemon Bucket), who was also musical director. During this time in New York, Power played the title role in the Irish Repertory Theatre’s production of The Shadow of A Gunman, and starred in The Irish Arts production’s Celtic Tiger Me Arse directed by Neal Jones, Rinty and Paddywack; and played Murph in the Second Stage production of The Indian Wants the Bronx, and Prince Hal in the Gorilla Repertory Theatre Company’s production of Henry IV parts 1 and 2. Through his work with the Irish Repertory Theatre, Power was offered the role of Juror number 7 in the Irish premiere of 12 Angry Men by Lane Productions in Dublin, the play ran for 18 months. This was followed by the lead role in another Lane production of 44 Sycamore by Bernard Farrell, which ran for 12 months. Power's Irish production company Big Papa then co-produced Sam Shepard’s Fool For Love at The New Theatre.

==== 2005–Present ====
Power had his West End debut in Bill Kenright's 2005 production of the Tennessee Williams play The Night of the Iguana alongside Woody Harrelson. Initially playing Hank, Power then shared the role of Shannon with Harrelson, and the two alternated midweek over the last three months of the run. As part of the centenary productions of Terence Rattigan in 2011, Power played Mark Walters in In Praise of Love at the Royal & Derngate theatre in Northampton. In 2015, Power returned to the West End to perform juror 7 with Tom Conti, Robert Vaughn and Jeff Fahey in Bill Kenright's production of Twelve Angry Men at the Garrick Theatre.

== Film and television ==
Among Power's first television roles were in Life with Mikey and Joe's Wedding. In 2004 Power played the role of series regular Warren on the controversial RTÉ series The Big Bow Wow. After one season the show was canceled and then 2005 Power was hired to play Garth O’Hara in the RTÉ Soap Opera Fair City. Power was cast as Frankie in the Irish coming-of-age film Cowboys and Angels. Power was then cast as John in Gilles MacKinnon's Tara Road, which filmed in Cape Town, Dublin and London. In 2005 Power was asked to read for a new comedy series for the BBC written by and starring Jack Dee. Lead Balloon, initially started on BBC4 and then moved to BBC2 where it ran from 2006–2011, with Power playing Marty, the sardonic writing partner of failed comedian Rick Spleen (Jack Dee). During this time Power also had guest leads on the British television series Moving Wallpaper, Holby City, Doctors, Taking the Flak, and Wild West. During this time Power filmed his first feature film in Played, a series of three with the actor and writer Mick Rossi. Played was produced by John Daly, with an all-star cast and indie film budget, it was originally intended to be a short. The film was shot without the use of a scripted screenplay and the director (Sean Stanek) allowed the actors to improvise a majority of dialogue as he shot the scenes. The film was shot on location in London and Los Angeles and took three years to complete. Rossi then offered Power the role of Rudy in the robbery film 2:22, then in 2012 Power starred along Rossi in the psychological thriller A Kiss and A Promise' as the character Charlie Matthews". During this time Power also appeared in minor role with Anthony Hopkins in Fernando Meirelles interrelationship film 360.

In 2011 Power returned to Dublin to film Honeymoon for One with Nicollette Sheridan. In late 2012, Power starred alongside Ryan Sampson, Kate Miles and Diane Morgan as Colby Brown in the mock reality/hidden camera show E4's The Work Experience. Each episode, partially scripted and improvised was shot in real time for 3 consecutive work days in a fictitious London PR firm. Each week, new interns were brought in believing they were participating in a documentary programme. At the end of filming The Work Experience, Power was cast as the vampire hunter Peter Vincent in 20th Century Fox's reboot Fright Night 2 filmed on location in Transylvania and Bucharest, Romania. This was followed by Steve Barker ‘s popular zombie film The Rezort alongside Dougray Scott and Martin McCann. Following The Rezort, Power was cast as a lead role alongside actors Billy Boyd, Alice Lowe, and Eline Powell in the Lennox Brothers debut feature Stoner Express (a.k.a. AmStarDam), a marijuana-fuelled fairytale shot in Amsterdam and London. In the film notorious author and cannabis smuggler Howard Marks played himself, this was his last film before he died in 2016. In 2016, Power created, directed and shot 10 episodes of Chinese Girls in London, a short format comedy series with an all-Chinese cast. The show was optioned by Roughcut Tv Productions with the pilot episode to be shown on BBC 3 in late 2017. During this time, Power was cast as Mitch, in Mick Jackson’s Bafta-nominated Denial, followed up by Lt Brett Biggle in Brad Pitt’s satirical war film, War Machine. In 2017 Power was reunited with Woody Harrelson working on his directorial debut Lost in London. The film was the first ever, to be shot in a single take, with one camera and streamed live to audiences in over 500 American theatres. Power followed this up with a role in Mark Strong’s series Deep State, which was filmed through late 2017 and released at the end of 2018. In 2019, Sean teamed up with Irish production company Wytao Film's William Morgan and Vincent Walsh to shoot the award winning comedy Double Denim. In early 2020 he was cast as Bradley in Anna Paquin's series "Flack".

== Filmography ==
- Life with Mikey (1993)
- Twisted Sheets (1996)
- Joe's Wedding (1996)
- Bad Karma (2002)
- Cowboys & Angels (2003)
- The Big Bow Wow (2004) (TV)
- Fair City' (2005-2008) (TV)
- Tara Road (2005)
- Holby City (2005) (TV)
- Played (2006)
- The Wild West (2006) (TV)
- Lead Balloon (2006–2011) (TV)
- 2:22 (2008)
- Moving Wallpaper (2009) (TV)
- Taking The Flack (2009)
- Doctors (2010)
- Secret Diary of a Call Girl (2011)
- Honeymoon For One (2011)
- 360 (2012)
- A Kiss And A Promise (2012)
- The Work Experience (2012) (TV)
- Fright Night 2: New Blood (2013)
- The Rezort (2015)
- Stoner Express (2016)
- Denial (2016)
- I Live With Models (2017) (TV)
- War Machine (2017)
- Lost In London (2017)
- Deep State (2018)
- In the Cloud (2018)
- Double Denim (2019)
- Flack (2020)
