= List of Lead Balloon episodes =

This is a list of episodes of the British television situation comedy Lead Balloon. The first series of six episodes aired in 2006 and a second series, extended to eight episodes, aired in 2007. The third series began in November 2008. All episodes are written by Jack Dee and Pete Sinclair, and are directed and produced by Alex Hardcastle.

== Series overview ==
Series	Episodes	Originally released		
Series	Episodes	First released	Last released	Network
1	6	4 October 2006	8 November 2006	BBC Four
2	8	15 November 2007	3 January 2008	BBC Two
3	7	13 November 2008	23 December 2008	BBC Two
4	6	31 May 2011	5 July 2011	BBC Two

== Episodes ==
=== Series 1 (2006) ===
No. overall	No. in series	Title	Directed by	Written by	Original release date
1	1	"Rubbish"	Alex Hardcastle	Jack Dee and Pete Sinclair	4 October 2006
Rick films an advertisement promoting recycling and is later invited, with Mel, to a christening by one of her clients, leaving them struggling to devise an excuse not to go. Rick and Marty try to write material for a corporate gig which Rick will be doing for a notorious loans company; Rick rejects all the material as dangerously provocative and later has a frustrating time trying to buy a christening present without being ripped off. Michael has devised a new cake recipe and forces Rick to take a sample home, where it is thrown away. A few days later, a series of articles appears in a tabloid, for which a journalist has gone through the contents of Rick's dustbin.
2	2	"Wayne"	Alex Hardcastle	Jack Dee and Pete Sinclair	11 October 2006
A noisy paperboy (the titular Wayne) is waking Rick early in the mornings, so he ineffectually complains to the newsagent (Vicki Pepperdine). The toaster breaks and Rick takes it back to the shop and lies to the owner (Ewen Macintosh) about when he bought it. He later steals teaspoons from Michael's café to make up for the short supply at home. Rick ends up buying a very expensive new toaster, shamefacedly returning the teaspoons to Michael (who also takes the toaster, presuming Rick bought it to make amends with him), and lying awake all night fretting about being woken up by Wayne.
3	3	"£5000"	Alex Hardcastle	Jack Dee and Pete Sinclair	18 October 2006
Rick has a fight that leaves him with a cut near his eye. Magda recommends vodka, which proves very painful. Michael is doing a sponsored skip for charity. Rick has sponsored him for £5, not realising that this means £5 per skip, for a predicted thousand skips (hence £5,000). Rick tries to back out and ends up offering Michael a flat £500, which Michael refuses. Marty is angry with Rick after a failed TV pitch (which is not shown). Shortly after, Rick 'accidentally' hits Michael with his car. Rick belittles the Community Support Officer investigating the accident, who has Rick arrested by a police officer and detained for a few hours.
4	4	"Allergic"	Alex Hardcastle	Jack Dee and Pete Sinclair	25 October 2006
Rick does a corporate gig with '70s comedian Bob Fairchild (Ted Robbins). Bob mentions he has a caffeine allergy. Rick takes a dislike to Bob and gives him caffeinated coffee. The next day Rick hears that Bob suddenly died. Rick worries that he inadvertently killed Bob with the coffee, and Marty winds him up. Bob's daughter Fiona, one of Mel's clients, is reportedly devastated. Rick and Marty work on material for a comedy news quiz, and Rick makes Magda pursue a shopping channel for an undelivered free gift. Eventually, the show goes very well and Rick learns how Bob really died. Rick and Marty return home loudly drunk and happy, only to find Mel in the kitchen comforting poor Fiona. Rick is tactless.
5	5	"Pistachio"	Alex Hardcastle	Jack Dee and Pete Sinclair	1 November 2006
Rick has bought a scooter, "pistachio" in colour (light green). The scooter is the subject of general derision and Rick becomes embarrassed with it. Magda's mother (in her home country) has injured her knee and Magda, believing that she has inherited weak knees, is wallowing in suffering. Rick has an argument with a dry cleaner (Omid Djalili). Rick buys a black leather jacket and later gives it to Magda, who then sells it on eBay. In the final credits, Rick is attempting to paint the scooter black.
6	6	"Fatty"	Alex Hardcastle	Jack Dee and Pete Sinclair	8 November 2006
After a chat show host comments on Rick's weight Mel and the others agree, and Marty taunts him with doughnuts. An elderly neighbour, Doris, has lost a cat, which Rick finds in his garage as he is heading out to the gym. At the gym, another man comments on Rick's weight. Rick angrily claims that his weight is a side-effect of cancer drugs, whereupon the other man reveals that he has colon cancer. An awkward scene results. Magda returns the cat and gets a £100 reward. Rick takes the money off her and donates it to the man's colon cancer charity. Later, Doris' son comes to Rick's house and makes Rick pay the money back. As Rick closes the door, the son comments on his weight. First appearance of Clive

=== Series 2 (2007–08) ===
No. overall	No. in series	Title	Directed by	Written by	Original release date
7	1	"Giraffe"	Alex Hardcastle	Jack Dee and Pete Sinclair	15 November 2007
Following an incorrect answer Rick gave on a game show, the husband of Rick's teammate insists that Rick promised to buy his wife the star prize car if he was wrong. Rick contests this, but is eventually forced to relent and buy a car to the value of his fee for appearing on the show (£2,000). Marty, meanwhile, ridicules the stupidity of Rick's response to the question and delights in telling Michael the tale, who consequentially prints of a list of amusing answers given on game shows from the internet, which features Rick's in the prominent position of number twelve. Magda objects to Rick's apparent description of her as a dog and threatens to leave, forcing Rick and Mel to plead with her to stay. Due to Magda's absence, Sam and Ben complain that there is no food in the house and in order to replenish their supplies, ask Rick for money which they then waste. Rick attempts to buy a cheap car and pass it off as being worth £2,000, which later leads to trouble from the police, which Rick then fobs off on a car salesman who refused to play ball with him.
8	2	"Hero"	Alex Hardcastle	Jack Dee and Pete Sinclair	22 November 2007
Rick talks a jumper down from a building who is later revealed to be a paedophile. He bumps into a man whom he believes to be commissioner of drama for ITV and invites him and his wife around for dinner, hoping to discuss a television proposal with him. Magda cooks an unusual delicacy for Rick to serve on the night, which he disposes of over a neighbour's fence. On the night of the dinner Mel reveals to Rick that the man is not ITV's drama chief; rather he is a builder who fixed their roof some years previously. To save face, Rick and Mel pretend they invited him around to discuss plans for a conservatory. The builder is delighted, though Rick later "accidentally" ruins the blueprints.
9	3	"Points"	Alex Hardcastle	Jack Dee and Pete Sinclair	29 November 2007
Rick is caught speeding and risks a driving ban if he gets three more point on his driving licence. His attempts to persuade Mel and Marty to admit they were driving his car prove futile and he believes there is no hope, until he learns Magda has recently passed her driving test. Michael convinces Rick to appear at an event to save the local library but later informs him his appearance has been cancelled because Rick refused to pay a £6 fine on a late book and threatened the librarian. As a result of his threats Rick has to attend an anger management class.
10	4	"Idiot"	Alex Hardcastle	Jack Dee and Pete Sinclair	6 December 2007
Rick records a short appeal video for a charity helping victims of "HUCCS", a disease that causes victims to burst into flames. The appeal is later revealed to be a hoax and that Rick was the victim of a hidden-camera show (see Brass Eye). Marty is offended when Rick claims he writes all his own jokes in order to impress a man. A client of Mel's records a television pilot for a chat show and Rick is her guest. The woman is an ex-ice dancer and Rick is interviewed inside a giant ice-skate.
11	5	"Sick"	Alex Hardcastle	Jack Dee and Pete Sinclair	13 December 2007
The women in Rick's house are sick and he is forced to take over. Rick promises to field Mel's work calls, but does more harm than good. Magda makes matters worse by arriving with her home-made soup. All these distractions are stopping Rick from working with Marty on the game show they want to pitch to a broadcaster: "Lying or Flying".
12	6	"Debacle"	Alex Hardcastle	Jack Dee and Pete Sinclair	20 December 2007
Rick hosts an event for a pharmaceutical company. His stand-up goes down surprisingly well, but some of his ill-advised gags have far-reaching consequences. Meanwhile, one of Mel's clients is presenting a new holiday programme, 'What Not to Pack', and Rick suggests Michael should be on the show. But Rick soon has bigger things to worry about, as he finds himself propelled into the spotlight—as public enemy number one.
13	7	"Rita"	Alex Hardcastle	Jack Dee and Pete Sinclair	26 December 2007
Rick lands a cameo role in a film, appearing alongside a Hollywood starlet from the '50s. When it turns out that Michael's father is her biggest fan, Rick promises to get her autograph for him: but it is easier said than done. Mel's work is less glamorous. One of her clients is presenting a new series of Geriatric Ward. At home, Rick has to deal with a lazy electrician. First appearance of Ambrose
14	8	"Lucky"	Alex Hardcastle	Jack Dee and Pete Sinclair	3 January 2008
Rick is sick of doing endless corporate gigs and accuses Marty of lacking ambition, but a call from Hollywood changes everything. One of Mel's clients is going through a divorce, Ben and Sam start their own dog-walking business and Michael the cafe manager has started going to 'cuddle parties'.

=== Series 3 (2008) ===
Series 3 is the first series in which the storylines of episodes are connected throughout. The first few storylines are as follows: Michael is distraught about finding out his father's sexuality, Magda is searching for a house after her bedsit gets infested with toxic gas, and Sam and Ben have made a single on YouTube. The following storylines are Magda accidentally selling some of Rick's prized possessions at a car-boot sale, Sam and Ben splitting up and Magda returning home for her sister's wedding.

No. overall	No. in series	Title	Directed by	Written by	Original release date
15	1	"Gas"	Alex Hardcastle	Jack Dee and Pete Sinclair	13 November 2008
The episode opens with Rick at a celebrity charity auction trying to attract bids for the waistcoat of an ex-rock star. To start the bidding, he opens with a bid of £500 but with no takers, he ends up with it. Seeing Michael's father at the auction with a man, he assumes that they are a gay couple and resolves to protect Michael from this revelation. Meanwhile Magda has had to move out of her flat as the gas boiler is faulty and moves into the Spleen household. It is clear that Michael believes his father's companion is solely a business colleague, however, when he relaunches his cafe as a chic restaurant, with less than complete success, it becomes clear that this is not the case; Rick's suspicions had been correct. The waistcoat bought by Rick turns out to be worth considerably more than he paid for it, but he has given it to his daughter, whose boyfriend has cut it up for a textiles project at college. Last appearance of Ambrose
16	2	"Panda"	Alex Hardcastle	Jack Dee and Pete Sinclair	20 November 2008
Magda has begun settling in, to the extent of infiltrating her fridge magnets and watching The Jeremy Kyle Show in the afternoons; meanwhile Rick has signed up for a television programme to trace his ancestry. Ben and Sam have formed a pop duo, 'Ben and Sam', who are shown performing a track called "Tragic" on YouTube. Michael is inexplicably missing after the revelations about his father, but Rick and Marty find him working out in his garage, seemingly unconcerned. Rick has discovered his Scottish ancestry for the programme, but since his family name is Shaw, the confused Magda thinks he may be Chinese. It turns out, however, that his family history is not interesting enough for the television programme, and is rejected.
17	3	"Fax"	Alex Hardcastle	Jack Dee and Pete Sinclair	27 November 2008
Rick appears as a guest on a much-loved panel game and earns the worst score in the show's history. At home, Rick and Mel are cleaning out the closets to find items for a local car boot sale which Madga is looking forward to attending. Rick's email crashes when he tries to send a finished script; he convinces an estate agent that he is interested in buying a house (solely because no other shop has a fax machine), and agrees to a house visit. Meanwhile, Michael has begun therapy sessions for his emotional issues, and Ben and Sam cause an annoyance with their loud practising, until Rick learns their song will be in a TV advert.
18	4	"Karma"	Alex Hardcastle	Jack Dee and Pete Sinclair	4 December 2008
A near-death experience makes Rick a changed man. From now on, he plans to embrace the positive and see only the good in people. His new attitude annoys Marty, who predicts it will not last. But Rick even manages to forgive Magda for selling some of his prized possessions at a car-boot sale, and when he lands the title role in a major TV drama, it looks like fate has rewarded him.
19	5	"Spikey"	Alex Hardcastle	Jack Dee and Pete Sinclair	11 December 2008
Rick's appearance on a radio phone-in show is not as successful as might be and Sam has split up with Ben for a new boyfriend, the eponymous 'Spikey', who is a drunken waster. Magda wants to return home for her sister's wedding and Mel agrees to pay for this, to Rick's disapproval. Meanwhile, Rick and Mel are invited to see a play by one of his former rivals. It turns out to be a gloomy experience, relieved only by Ben's mobile phone that Rick is keeping hold of ringing at an inopportune moment. The following morning, Magda announces that the wedding is off as her sister's intended has turned out to be already married. Ben and Sam become reconciled as Spikey has put himself into hospital trying to reconnect the electricity at his squat. Rick's appearance at a function for a junk mail organisation goes awry when he is lampooned for the mobile phone incident, which has been reported in the local press. Although Spikey has been frequently mentioned in every series of the show, this is his only actual appearance.
20	6	"Mistake"	Alex Hardcastle	Jack Dee and Pete Sinclair	18 December 2008
Rick finds his order of letterheads mis-spells his name as 'Bick'. Rick and Marty are thinking up some new concepts to pitch to TV executives. Mel moves her agency office into the living room. Marty develops a crush on Izzy, Mel's assistant. Magda returns to the UK with her sister, to whom Rick pays £20 to fix his letterheads with correction fluid, although she runs out and finishes the job with a pen. Magda appears to dislike Izzy. Ben and Sam cook up a plan to sell samosas at a festival, but find they are unable to without the correct health and safety licensing. Rick overhears Mel and Izzy talking about a panel show for which Rick thinks he would be perfect. Izzy feeds Marty false information on who will become team captain on the show and Rick telephones the producer of the show and makes up some damaging information about the individual. It turns out that Mel was actually pitching Rick for the show, and he has inadvertently caused the producer to re-think the position. The episode ends with Rick's neighbour attempting to complain about Ben and Sam attempting to sell his elderly mother the samosas. Rick slams the door in his face, the screen fades to black with the doorbell being rung repeatedly.
21	7	"Nuts"	Alex Hardcastle	Jack Dee and Pete Sinclair	23 December 2008
Rick is looking forward to spending a quiet Christmas at home with Mel. It will be a well-earned break from the challenging acting role he is currently immersed in—playing the part of Mr Smee in a panto. Marty is no fan of pantomime, or of Christmas in general, and plans to head off for some winter sun—preferably to a country where carol-singing is punishable by death. Meanwhile, Michael has fallen in love at first sight with a chat room friend named Zoe and is already planning to propose on their first date. Ben and Sam are spending the holidays together, accompanied by Sam's gift to Ben of "homemade" mince pies. As for Magda, plans to return home to spend Christmas with her family are called off in favour of a week of mourning when her country's president dies.

=== Series 4 (2011) ===
The final series of Lead Balloon upholds the continuity throughout that series 3 maintained. The first main story arc is Rick getting a job as a presenter of a bargain channel. After this arc ends (when Rick is forced to resign after accidentally insulting the viewers on air), another opens up about Rick being taken as a hostage while giving a stand-up comedy lesson in a prison, then getting famous for the story, leading to the climax.

No. overall	No. in series	Title	Directed by	Written by	Original release date
22	1	"Pig"	Alex Hardcastle	Jack Dee and Pete Sinclair	31 May 2011
Mel is offered the chance to appear in The Sunday Times under an "At Home With..." headline. In the midst of writing his first novel, Rick jumps at the chance. To seem like an extraordinary couple, Rick buys a pig in a moment of impulse, and when Mel tells him to return it he finds the pet shop closed. It is up to Rick to hide the pig as the journalists visit his house for the article, not to mention thinking of ideas for his novel to talk about.
23	2	"Dead"	Alex Hardcastle	Jack Dee and Pete Sinclair	7 June 2011
Rick lands a job as a presenter on the Bargain Channel—it is Britain's premier shopping channel, as he points out to anyone who will listen. For once, his new job impresses surly East-European help Magda, who is a big fan of the show. His writing partner Marty and local café owner Michael are not so easily convinced, but Rick is determined that he is finally found something he is good at.
24	3	"Shoddy"	Alex Hardcastle	Jack Dee and Pete Sinclair	14 June 2011
Rick's going from strength to strength in his new job as a presenter on the Bargain Channel, but he is not best pleased when Marty takes a shine to his co-presenter, Donna. Rick's neighbour Clive is on the warpath, demanding a refund for an ornamental windmill that his mother bought from the Bargain Channel, but it is Rick's shocking behaviour at a funeral that gets him into real trouble—and threatens to kill off his career for good.
25	4	"Off"	Alex Hardcastle	Jack Dee and Pete Sinclair	21 June 2011
(Part 1 of 2). Magda is trying to claim compensation after tripping on a paving stone, although Rick suspects that she may have faked her injury. With no other work on offer, Rick decides to set up his own stand-up comedy workshop. The first two classes prove disastrous, but hope is on the horizon in the form of council executive Libby. She offers him a course teaching comedy in prison. Rick reluctantly agrees, but after the first class has finished a prisoner named Donald (Robbie Coltrane) gets Rick in a headlock and threatens him with a razor blade.
26	5	"Blade"	Alex Hardcastle	Jack Dee and Pete Sinclair	28 June 2011
(Part 2 of 2). Rick is taken hostage and trapped in the prison library by Donald, who is revealed to be taking him as a hostage in protest against the prison not letting him have a chess set in his cell. When he locks himself in the prison library with Rick, he makes friendly conversation with Rick and does not appear to be at all aggressive, until he figures out that Rick has been lying to him. This causes him to express his pathological hatred for liars and ask Rick why he lies, causing Rick to reflect on his compulsive lying habit that he has demonstrated constantly since he was a child, showing remorse for it and wanting to change. While Rick explains his history of lying, Donald falls asleep and Rick sneaks out of the room. He is later seen in a press interview lying about what happened, showing that he will never change. Due to this being a unique two-hander episode, it is the first one to not feature Mel, Marty, Magda, Michael, Sam or Ben.
27	6	"End"	Alex Hardcastle	Jack Dee and Pete Sinclair	5 July 2011
Rick has at last found the fame and success he so desperately craved. Thanks to his ordeal as a hostage and subsequent lies about how he overpowered his captor Donald, he is now known as the "Prison Siege Comic" to the tabloids, and agrees to host the Brave Britain Awards in front of a live television audience of millions. Meanwhile, he objects to his neighbor Clive's planning permission to have a wheelchair ramp installed for his elderly mother, his petty revenge for Clive objecting to allow him to install an extra window. Rick receives a letter saying "Tell the truth Rick" shortly before the awards, and as he prepares to go onstage he is threatened by two of Donald's friends, who tell him to tell the truth onstage. As he tells the audience the truth, they begin to laugh and applaud, assuming that he is joking. The show is an unprecedented success for Rick; however, Clive shows up afterwards with his mother and threatens to tell the crowd about Rick's objection to the ramp. As he begins his story, Rick attempts to punch him, but Clive dodges and Rick instead accidentally strikes Clive's 85-year-old wheelchair-user mother.
