= Played (film) =

- Played DVD cover
- Directed by: Sean Stanek
- Written by: Sean Stanek; Mick Rossi
- Produced by: Caspar von Winterfeldt; Mick Rossi; Nick Simunek; David Brin
- Starring: Mick Rossi Gabriel Byrne; Val Kilmer; Adam Fogerty; Vinnie Jones; Joanne Whalley; Patsy Kensit; Bruno Kirby Anthony LaPaglia
- Cinematography: Michael Pavlisan; Sean Stanek
- Edited by: Matthew Booth; Jonathan Brayley; Tom McGah; Benjamin Pollack
- Music by: Danny Saber
- Distributed by: Lions Gate Entertainment
- Release dates: May 19, 2006 (Cannes Film Festival); October 20, 2006 (Hollywood Film Festival)
- Country: United Kingdom
- Language: English

Played is a 2006 British crime film directed by Sean Stanek. The film stars Val Kilmer, Gabriel Byrne, Vinnie Jones, Patrick Bergin, Joanne Whalley, Bruno Kirby (in his final film), Anthony LaPaglia, Roy Dotrice, Patsy Kensit, Andy Nyman and Mick Rossi.

Originally intended to be a short, the film was shot without the use of a scripted screenplay and the director (Sean Stanek) allowed the actors to improvise a majority of dialogue as he shot the scenes. The picture was shot on location in London and Los Angeles and took three years to complete.

== Plot ==
The story opens in Los Angeles with Dillon (Val Kilmer) who receives a phone call from Ray Burns (Mick Rossi) who has just been shot and desperately needs help. Dillon is a cleaner for a gangster named Eddie (Gabriel Byrne) and has been sent to assist Ray should he require it. After a colorful opening title sequence which follows Dillon's drive to the house, he finds Ray almost bleeding to death on a sofa. Removing all of the evidence, Dillon leaves carrying Ray to his car but not before he torches the house, destroying any evidence of Ray's presence. As Dillon and Ray drive away, Dillon struggles to keep Ray conscious and relates to him a story of a humorous encounter with a Mexican auto mechanic, which coins one of the catchphrases of the film: "I'm not gonna taco".

The story then flashes back to eight years earlier and introduces Riley (Patrick Bergin) as he admires some artwork in a London gallery. He receives a call on his cell phone from the crooked Detective Brice (Vinnie Jones), who informs Riley that there is a shipment of heroin coming in, and that he wants Riley to get a team together and steal it for him. Riley agrees to the job and tells Brice that he has just the man to do it, a petty thief named Ray Burns. Riley gives a menacing stare to the gallery attendant (Caspar von Winterfeldt) in one of the films funnier moments before leaving to meet with Ray.

After they discuss the details of the job at hand, Ray agrees to do the job and meets up with his team, which consists of Nathan (Sean Power) and Terry Rawlings (Trevor Nugent) son of infamous moblord Jack Rawlings (Roy Dotrice) and Terry's girlfriend, Cindy (Patsy Kensit). Together they begin plotting the heist: Nathan will go up to the roof and act as lookout while Ray and Terry break into the warehouse to steal the heroin. Unfortunately, during the heist, Nathan loses his footing and tumbles to his death, falling through a skylight and triggering an alarm, alerting the guards. Ray and Terry manage to escape with the drugs, but lose contact with each other.

Shortly thereafter, Brice calls Riley to inform him that the heist went terribly wrong, and that Nathan is dead. To cover his own tracks, he tells Riley to find a scapegoat, and Riley immediately names Ray. Meanwhile, Ray, who has gone into hiding, tries to call Terry but doesn't get an answer. He turns to Riley to find out what happened. Riley tells Ray that Nathan is dead and that Scotland Yard is looking for him, omitting the fact that Terry has handed over the drugs and that Brice is behind the whole heist. Ray decides he needs to disappear for a while and attempts to go underground, but before he can do so the police pick him up on an anonymous tip from Brice. Ray is convicted for the robbery and the manslaughter of Nathan, and is subsequently sentenced to eight years in prison.

Ray serves his time, but has no contact with the outside world, denying even his closest lover and girlfriend Maggie (Joanne Whalley) a visit. He also learns by reading the paper that Terry has died of a drug overdose. Saddened by the news, Ray vows to get revenge on Brice and Riley as soon as he is free.

While Ray is serving time, Riley and Brice continue their crooked ways, and Brice informs Riley that he has an incriminating video tape of London Charlie (Steve Jones) that could be worth some cash. He dispatches Riley to Los Angeles to blackmail London Charlie. Riley arrives in Los Angeles along with his girlfriend Samantha Fay (Sile Bermingham) in order to pick up the cash from Brice. Meanwhile, Ray is released from prison and contacted by London Charlie, who realizes that the only way he can escape his dilemma is to have Riley terminated. He knows Ray is out to avenge his time in prison and so pays him $100,000 to come to Los Angeles. Brice, aware of Ray's release and suspicious that he may be up to something, instructs an underling, Danny, (Andy Nyman) to keep an eye on him and find out what he can about his plans. Danny confronts Ray in a busy London street and brings the situation to a head when he makes a comment about Ray's former girlfriend Maggie, whom Ray has not seen since he went to prison. Ray angrily headbutts Danny, telling him to leave him alone. Danny reports this back to Brice, who still believes Ray is up to something.

Ray is soon contacted by Jack Rawlings, Terry's father, who beckons him to come and visit. The two have a long talk about Terry and Ray tells Jack how sorry he is for Terry's death. Jack feigns compassion and tells Ray that he wants him to go after the guy who set them up, namely Riley, and gives him a contact in Los Angeles, Eddie, who can help him with the job. Ray is to pick up $100,000 at Jack's club from Big Frankie (Adam Fogerty) and then get on a plane to Los Angeles to hunt Riley down.

Upon arrival, Ray immediately goes to London Charlie's house (which is revealed to be the one seen in the beginning of the film) to meet with him. Ray is told that there is $100,000 in a bag that he is to take to Riley and use to recover the tape. Once he has the tape, Ray is to kill Riley and bring the tape back to London Charlie. Ray leaves and begins to cover his tracks by checking into two separate motels. He then makes a call to Eddie to pick up a car for use in Los Angeles. That night he picks up the car and meets Eddie, who is waiting for him in the back seat. Eddie tells him there is a pistol in the glove box and that he doesn't want to get involved in any of the nasty business. Ray acknowledges the request and takes off into the night.

The next day, Riley is waiting to meet with London Charlie. He is surprised by Ray, who shows up at his door carrying a bag of cash. Ray has hidden the pistol outside of the apartment and so is clean when he is frisked by Riley. The two have a heated discussion about what happened eight years ago and Riley makes light of Terry's death, much to Ray's chagrin. Ray gives the bag of cash to Riley, who angrily informs him that the amount is only half of what he and London Charlie had agreed to, and ordering him to get him the rest if he wants the tape. Ray exits the apartment, retrieves his pistol, then goes back inside and demands the tape from Riley at gunpoint. Riley refuses, and Ray shoots him once in the chest, then once in the back of the head, killing him.

Ray searches the apartment for the tape, but only finds a key to a room at a nearby hotel. Ray returns to his first hotel to wash Riley's blood off of himself before he goes to check out the other hotel. Meanwhile, police are investigating the shooting death at Riley's apartment. Detective Allen (Bruno Kirby) arrives on the crime scene and discovers that there is a link to a nearby hotel—the same hotel Ray is also heading to. Detective Bartow (Mark Siciliani) and Officer Chris Anders (Aaron Gallagher) are dispatched to investigate. At the hotel they find Samantha Fay, who is startled by their appearance. When the officers inform her that there has been an incident and they need to take her to the station to answer some questions, she reluctantly agrees. Officer Anders escorts her out, leaving Detective Bartow to search the room. Ray arrives as they are leaving, running into Bartow as he attempts to enter the room. Ray attempts to keep his cool, especially when Bartow tells him he is a police officer. He questions Ray as to how he knew Riley, and Ray innocently says they recently met and that they had arranged to grab a drink. Bartow is suspicious and asks Ray if he would have any objections to coming down to the station for some questioning. Ray has no choice but to agree, and they leave together.

At the station, Ray and Samantha are questioned for hours and hours by Detective Allen and Detective Drummond (Anthony LaPaglia). The situation is tense, and they both have a tough time keeping calm. Eventually they are both let go, but not before Samantha is told that Riley is dead. Both leave the station within a couple of hours of each other and head in different directions, Ray to pick up his things at the second motel, and Samantha to pick up the tape and a gun which Riley had left in a safety deposit box earlier that day. Samantha then heads to London Charlie's house to square things away with him and avenge Riley's death. She shoots London Charlie dead in his pool just as Ray arrives to say goodbye. Ray and Samantha have a Mexican stand-off. The now-useless tape is thrown into the pool, and Samantha slowly backs out of the house, leaving Ray to sort out the mess. As Ray sits to contemplate his next move, he doesn't notice Samantha sneaking back inside, who shoots Ray in the back. Samantha leaves and Ray is left in a pool of blood, but still alive. The scene from the film's opening replays as Ray picks up the phone to call Eddie and reaches Dillon, who comes to clean up his mess.

Dillon finally gets Ray to a secure location, and Ray pays him off so that he can return to London, where he recuperates for several days in the care of Maggie. Ray thinks quickly about what he should do when he receives a phone call from Eddie, telling him that Jack Rawlings wants to see him on the rooftop of a car-park in Chinatown later that evening. After Eddie hangs up, he anonymously calls Brice and tells him about the meeting. Brice is confused, but eager to settle the score with Ray. He calls Danny to tell him that he should follow Ray to the meeting and kill him.

While Danny circles the streets of London in an attempt to find Ray, he stumbles on Maggie and follows her back to her flat. Ray, meanwhile, is visiting with Cindy, whom he had rescued from the streets prior to his departure to Los Angeles and had given shelter to while she attempted to recover from her drug habit. Danny forces his way into Maggie's apartment and, after roughing her up, takes Ray's remaining money and returns to his place. When Ray returns, he grabs Maggie and they head over to Danny's flat. Ray breaks in and finds Nikki (Meredith Ostrom) clutching the bag of money and Danny jamming on drugs. Ray also hears a recording on Danny's answering machine of Brice telling Danny to kill him. Ray kills Danny, then takes the tapes from the answering machine and the bag of money. He and Maggie then leave to head to the rendezvous in Chinatown.

Brice arrives at Danny's place a little later after Nikki has called the police, and finds Danny dead. Brice also notices that the tapes from the machine are missing and now has no choice but to show up on the car park rooftop for the inevitable showdown.

When Ray leaves to go to the rooftop, Maggie calls an undisclosed person and tells them Ray just left. On the rooftop, Brice attacks Ray. Eddie arrives and shoots Brice.

Jack then shows up and explains he set it all up to get revenge for the death of his son, Terry. Jack says he will make sure Ray takes the fall for the deaths. Ray leaves with a gunshot wound in his abdomen, stumbling through London.

== Cast ==
- Val Kilmer as Dillon
- Gabriel Byrne as Eddie
- Mick Rossi as Ray Burns
- Patrick Bergin as Riley
- Joanne Whalley as Maggie
- Roy Dotrice as Jack Rawlings
- Vinnie Jones as Detective Brice
- Patsy Kensit as Bunny/ Cindy
- Anthony LaPaglia as Detective Drummond
- Bruno Kirby as Detective Allen
- Andy Nyman as Danny
- Sile Bermingham as Samantha Fay
- Meredith Ostrom as Nikki
- Steve Jones as London Charlie
- Trevor Nugent as Terry Rawlings
- Aaron Gallagher as Officer Chris Anders
- Nick Simunek as Boyd
- Adam Fogerty as Big Frankie
- Nigel Mead as Chris the Maggot
- Luca Palanca as Patrol Officer Gomez
- Sean Power as Nathan
- Marc Siciliani as Detective Bartow

== Development ==
Played came about through a series of bizarre circumstances. Mick Rossi was working as a writer in Hollywood at the time and was having no luck in selling or producing his scripts. He was desperate to put some of his ideas on film and with the collaboration of his friend and partner Sean Stanek, the two embarked on shooting a short film to break the ice and display some of their talents. Gabriel Byrne was a close friend of Rossi's and agreed to do some filming with the two young filmmakers.

As Rossi describes in an interview after the film was made:

It was blood, sweat, and tears. I'd always written scripts as a vehicle to try and back-door myself in as an actor, because, as you know, it's very difficult for an actor to get good work without good representation. It's a Catch-22. I'd just lost financing on a movie I'd written and worked on for about a year, and the financing fell through at the last minute. I was really, really depressed and disillusioned with the people I was in business with, and I wanted to do something where I could literally pick up a camera, assemble a small bunch of people, and get out and start shooting immediately and didn't have to chase Hollywood money. That's really how it started. Initially, we were going to shoot a 15-minute short and see how it went from there. One of my best friends is Gabriel Byrne and as soon as Gabriel said that he would jump in, it made it a lot easier for the other actors to say yes. It kind of just grew from there, so that was the beginning of it. It was always a dream of mine to make something which was very real, very kind of gritty, and very rock 'n roll style movie-making. I drew on the movies from the seventies, because I loved movies like The Panic in Needle Park, Dog Day Afternoon, Serpico, The Long Good Friday, and Get Carter. Once we hit certain points, it was like we knew we had to go all the way with it. That's really how it started.
