= Sessions with Mick =

Demo album by Val Kilmer and Mick Rossi
- Released: 2007
- Genre: Rock
- Length: 28:04

Sessions with Mick is a demo album by American actor Val Kilmer and multi-instrumentalist Mick Rossi. Kilmer sold the songs via his MySpace page and attempted to court record labels circa 2007. Per The New York Observer, the album consists of "seven songs co-written by the duo that run the gamut from foot-stompin' rock to moody, guttural ballads" and includes a Christmas song that "brims with holiday spirit". The album was sold in support of charities V-Day and The Wild Life Center in Santa Fe, New Mexico.

== Reception ==
The New York Observer and Paste both noted the project's lyrics, with the latter surmising that perhaps "even [Kilmer's] publicist can't get behind lyrics like these." Listverse writer Edward Lola called "Frontier Justice" "eerie but well produced" and said "Kilmer actually has a decent singing voice." Miami New Times's Ben Westhoff noted "influences of Neil Young, Elton John, and [Kilmer's] friend Sean Lennon", praised "the opera-trained Juilliard grad" Kilmer's voice and said "his mostly acoustic guitar tunes are often hummable", but that "his songwriting leaves a bit to be desired."

== Track listing ==
All tracks are written by Val Kilmer and Mick Rossi.

Sessions with Mick track listing
No.	Title	Length
1.	"Pigtails"	5:03
2.	"True Friend"	4:13
3.	"Frontier Justice"	3:56
4.	"Christmas Is Calling"	4:09
5.	"All Children Are Beautiful"	3:33
6.	"We All Need"	3:38
7.	"A Song Beyond Your Years"	3:32
Total length:		28:04

== Personnel ==
- Val Kilmer – vocals
- Mick Rossi – keyboards, percussion
