= Love's Kitchen =

- Directed by: James Hacking
- Written by: James Hacking
- Produced by: J. Alan Davis; James Hacking; Simone Ling; Duncan Napier-Bell; Nicholas Napier-Bell
- Starring: Dougray Scott; Claire Forlani; Simon Callow; Gordon Ramsay
- Cinematography: Jordan Cushing
- Edited by: Rupert Hall; Kant Pan
- Music by: Tom Howe
- Distributed by: Screen Media Films (US)
- Release date: 7 June 2011
- Running time: 93 minutes
- Country: United Kingdom
- Language: English

Love's Kitchen (originally titled No Ordinary Trifle) is a 2011 British romantic comedy film directed by James Hacking and starring Dougray Scott, Claire Forlani, Michelle Ryan, and featured celebrity chef Gordon Ramsay in his first acting role. Hacking also wrote the script for the film, and it was the director's first feature-length film.

The once coveted London chef Rob Haley visits a village pub, three years after his wife's accidental death, hoping to motivate himself to create quality again. He meets a cute food critic there, buys it to open a restaurant and move there with his daughter.

The film received a limited theatrical release in the UK, taking £121 on its opening weekend from five screens. It was released direct to DVD in the United States. Film critics gave it mostly negative reviews, and the film received a score of 19% on Rotten Tomatoes.

== Plot ==
Chef Rob Haley is left grief-stricken after his wife Françoise is killed in a car accident. It was a senseless act, caused by her combined unsafe habits of using her mobile while driving at excessive speeds. So, he loses his passion for his work.

Once a coveted chef, a particularly bad review causes him to lose customers at his once successful restaurant. His friend Gordon Ramsay comes looking for him after seeing it, convincing him to pull himself out of his funk. So, Rob buys the pub his wife meant for their restaurant three years ago, and he relocates to the countryside with his daughter Michelle and some loyal members of his staff (Loz, Ingo and Shauna).

They plan to turn a local pub into a gastropub. When Rob first visits the location, an American woman rudely and dangerously overtakes him on the way. Then, as the crew are doing a little renovating, local homeowner Livingston and James Forester pass by, both slightly threatening, both mentioning Kate.

On the opening day of the restaurant, American food critic Kate Templeton arrives, narrowly missing Michelle with her jeep. Recognising her from when she rudely gestured at him before, her reckless driving results in an argument with Rob. Afterwards, by way of apology, he offers her lunch, under the condition that she not write a review.

Rob begrudgingly gives Kate the OK to write the review once he sees word of mouth is not bringing in enough customers. And, before they know it, the pub is fully booked for days. Kate stops by, and when she asks about the scalding review Rob has tacked on the wall, he explains it is what motivated him to get back into his cooking.

After Rob and Kate almost kiss, he gets motivated to say farewell to Françoise. He does so by watching the sunset and dispersing her ashes with a glass of red wine. Shortly thereafter, he and Kate finally connect intimately, as do Loz and Shauna.

Renowned food critic Guy Witherspoon on TV for Food for Thought shows up, offering to put Rob on the show, which his staff talk him into.

Some of the locals are content with the visitors that the restaurant is bringing to the area, whilst others, like Kate's father, want it closed down. He enlists Forester to get the restaurant shut down by the health inspector using rats. When Forester goes out of his way to deliver the notice, he tells Rob to stay away from Kate. He gives him her panties as proof of his connection with her and discloses it was Kate who wrote the article that shut down his other restaurant.

Confronting Kate, Rob tells her to get out. A day passes, and Guy's camera crew arrive to shoot his show. Having forgotten, Rob quickly assembles his crew and they assess their options. At first leaving Ingo in charge because of the hearing, Rob blows it off to prepare for Guy's program. Unbeknownst to him, Kate goes to speak for her father, withdrawing his complaints and for Rob, saying the others were completely fabricated.

Guy's visit results in an excellent report and ongoing success for the restaurant under Rob and Kate, who reconcile.

== Cast ==
- Dougray Scott as Rob Haley
- Claire Forlani as Kate Templeton
- Michelle Ryan as Shauna
- Simon Callow as Guy Witherspoon
- Cherie Lunghi as Margaret
- Gordon Ramsay as himself
- Joshua Bowman as Roberto
- Peter Bowles as Max Templeton
- Lee Boardman as Loz
- Adam Fogerty as Terry
- Pip Torrens as Health and Safety Official
- Caroline Langrishe as Liz
- Holly Gibbs as Michelle

== Production ==
The film was based on the story of pub owner John Hailey, on whom the character of Rob Haley was based. The character of Kate Templeton was a play on words based on the fact that the pub it was based on was a local for Kate Middleton, later Duchess of Cambridge. The script was written by James Hacking, who went on to direct the film, marking it as his first full-length feature. Hacking also provided funding for the film himself. Dougray Scott and Claire Forlani were cast opposite each other, although in real life they were husband and wife. Hacking pursued Gordon Ramsay for a role in the film for some time, but decided not to go through his agents and approached him directly. Ramsay agreed to appear at his own expense. Ramsay's name was misspelt in the closing credits as "Ramsey".

Scenes from the film were shot on site at Elstree Studios. One scene features Michelle Ryan driving an Alfa Romeo. Production on the film was completed in March 2009.

== Release ==
Love's Kitchen was entered in the 2010 Toronto International Film Festival. The film made its debut showing in the UK at the Kingussie Food on Film Festival in February 2011 under its original name of No Ordinary Trifle. The only actor from the film to make an appearance was Lee Boardman. It took £121 on its opening weekend (on 5 screens) in the UK after release on 24 June 2011, comparing poorly with the same weekend's biggest opening film, Bridesmaids, which took £3.44 million (on 482 screens), including previews of £1.03m. Due to the appearance by Ramsay in the film, the low levels of takings was highlighted by the press who sought to get a response by the chef, but he refused to comment except to state that he wished to have no involvement in the promotion of the film.

DVD release in the United States preceded the UK cinema release, with the film going straight to DVD on 7 June. It was also presented at the 2011 Dances With Films independent film festival, where it opened the event, but not entered in the competition. The film was released in the UK on DVD less than three weeks after its cinema release, coming out on 11 July.

=== Critical reception ===
Following the release of the trailer for the film, critics began to criticise it as they thought they could guess the entire plot straight away, while Digital Spy's Simon Reynolds predicted that it would be a candidate for the worst film of the year.

Following release, the film garnered a 19% approval rating from 16 critics on the review-aggregate website Rotten Tomatoes. The film was heavily criticised upon release by the British media. David Edwards for The Daily Mirror suggested that people should see it "for a masterclass in how not to make a film. The effect is like smashing plates over your head while suffering from violent diarrhoea." However, the newspaper also listed the film as a "nicely staged British rom-com". The Guardian's Peter Bradshaw described the film as "abysmal", and in particular thought that Gordon Ramsay was "excruciating".

Henry Fitzherbert at the Daily Express described it as "astonishingly amateur and awful", while Sky Movies critic Tim Evans described it as a "veritable banquet of awfulness". Empire gave the film a score of two out of five. Total Film thought better of the film, with Emma Dibden describing it as having a "sharp script" while praising both Dougray Scott and Simon Callow, and giving the film a score of four out of five.
