= The Rezort =

- Theatrical release poster
- Directed by: Steve Barker
- Written by: Paul Gerstenberger
- Produced by: Nick Gillott; Karl Richards; Charlotte Walls
- Starring: Dougray Scott; Jessica De Gouw; Martin McCann
- Cinematography: Roman Osin
- Edited by: Martí Roca
- Music by: Zacarías M. de la Riva
- Production companies: LWH Entertainment; Umedia; Kraken Films, The; Black Camel Pictures; Bulletproof Cupid; Captain Starlight Company; Creative Scotland; Gloucester Place Films
- Distributed by: Ascot Elite Entertainment Group; Alfa Pictures; Axinite Digicinema
- Release dates: 22 June 2015 (BFI Southbank); 22 April 2016
- Running time: 93 minutes
- Country: United Kingdom
- Language: English

The Rezort is a 2015 British zombie horror film directed by Steve Barker and written by Paul Gerstenberger. It stars Dougray Scott, Jessica De Gouw and Martin McCann. After humanity wins a devastating war against zombies, the few remaining undead are kept on a secure island, where they are hunted for sport. When something goes wrong with the island's security gates, the zombies attack the guests and the world faces the possibility of a new outbreak.

== Plot ==
After humanity wins a war against hordes of zombies, which led to two billion deaths, the only remaining zombies are kept on an island, where they are hunted for sport by tourists at a luxury facility called the Rezort. Guests include the young couple Lewis and Melanie, who want to conquer Melanie's psychological issues caused by the zombie war; Archer, a quiet veteran; Jack and Alfie, teenage video gamers; and Sadie, whose ex-fiancé dumped her prior to their wedding. After the group meets the owner of the resort, Valerie Wilton, Archer sees Sadie sneak into a control room. There, she hacks into a mainframe, causing the system to become erratic. The engineers, scared they could lose their jobs due to their careless system security, keep quiet about the problems as they attempt to fix the system.

After meeting their guide, Nevins, the guests leave the resort to hunt zombies. The first group of zombies are restrained in place and easily killed. The second group roam freely, and the guests snipe at them from a safe distance. Despite Lewis' urging, Melanie can not bring herself to shoot one. Archer surprises the others by scoring many rapid head shots, later explaining that he has come to the resort because killing zombies is the only thing he was ever good at. Nevins leads them to a safe spot, and they camp for the night. When they can not sleep, Melanie and Sadie discuss the ethics of killing zombies for sport, and Sadie says she believes it leads to a decreased inhibition to harm the living.

After several system failures, the resort's security system goes offline. Zombies are released from their fenced-in pens, infecting the guests and staff in the resort. Wilton escapes to her office, sealing the door behind her and dooming the remaining engineers. The guests outside the resort in the safari do not realize what has happened until the now-freed zombies attack them. Alfie is killed in the melee. Nevins tells them the entire island will be firebombed in several hours as a fail-safe, and their only hope is to escape to the docks. Nevins' Land Rover Defender fails to start, and Archer leads them on foot toward the docks. As they pass through a security checkpoint, Nevins is bitten and becomes infected. Lewis angers Melanie when he kills Nevins with a head shot.

When the guests are on their way to the docks, Archer threatens to leave Sadie behind unless she reveals her involvement in the resort's problems. She admits to being a member of a zombie rights activist group and says she merely copied documents from the resort's mainframe to prove the resort's dangerous and unethical practices. Jack says she was used to inject a virus in the system and destroy the resort. Although angry at her actions, Melanie promises Sadie she will not be left behind. After zombies attack, the guests get caught in tunnels; Archer, Melanie, and Lewis go one way, and Jack and Sadie another. Sadie is bitten and sacrifices herself to give Jack time to escape. Before she dies, she gives him her evidence.

Jack rejoins the others, and they enter the resort. After wandering through a security area, they discover the resort has been using a charitable front organization to lure refugees to the island, where they are transformed into zombies. Jack is bitten, and Archer kills him. As Archer and Melanie hold back zombies, Lewis abandons them. Archer tells Melanie to flee to the docks and apparently sacrifices himself. Near the control room, Melanie encounters Lewis, who has subsequently been bitten. Instead of killing him, she hands him her pistol. Melanie is attacked, but Wilton rescues her. Melanie accuses her of being worse than the zombies; when Wilton attacks her, a nearby zombie horde is alerted, breaks in and kills Wilton. Melanie escapes the resort by leaping into the sea as the firebombing begins. After being rescued, she reveals the extent of the resort's crimes; Archer – revealed to have also escaped – watches her on television. Melanie says that in winning the war, people lost their humanity. After Melanie warns of a new zombie war, the news program cuts to a live feed in which zombies are attacking people on a beach.

== Cast ==
- Dougray Scott as Archer
- Jessica De Gouw as Melanie Gibbs
- Martin McCann as Lewis Evans
- Jassa Ahluwalia as Jack
- Lawrence Walker as Alfie
- Elen Rhys as Sadie
- Sean Power as Spencer
- Kevin Shen as Nevins
- Claire Goose as Valerie Wilton
- Robert Firth as Kenneth Varantoom

== Release ==
The film was first screened at BFI Southbank on 22 June 2015. It had limited release in Spain on 22 April 2016. It was released to the Philippines on 15 June 2016.

== Reception ==
Pat Torfe of Bloody Disgusting rated it 3/5 stars and wrote, "It’s entertaining, but it’s a fire-and-forget type of film." Jeremy Dick of Fansided stated the film was "like Jurassic Park with zombies".
