= Meredith Ostrom =

American actress

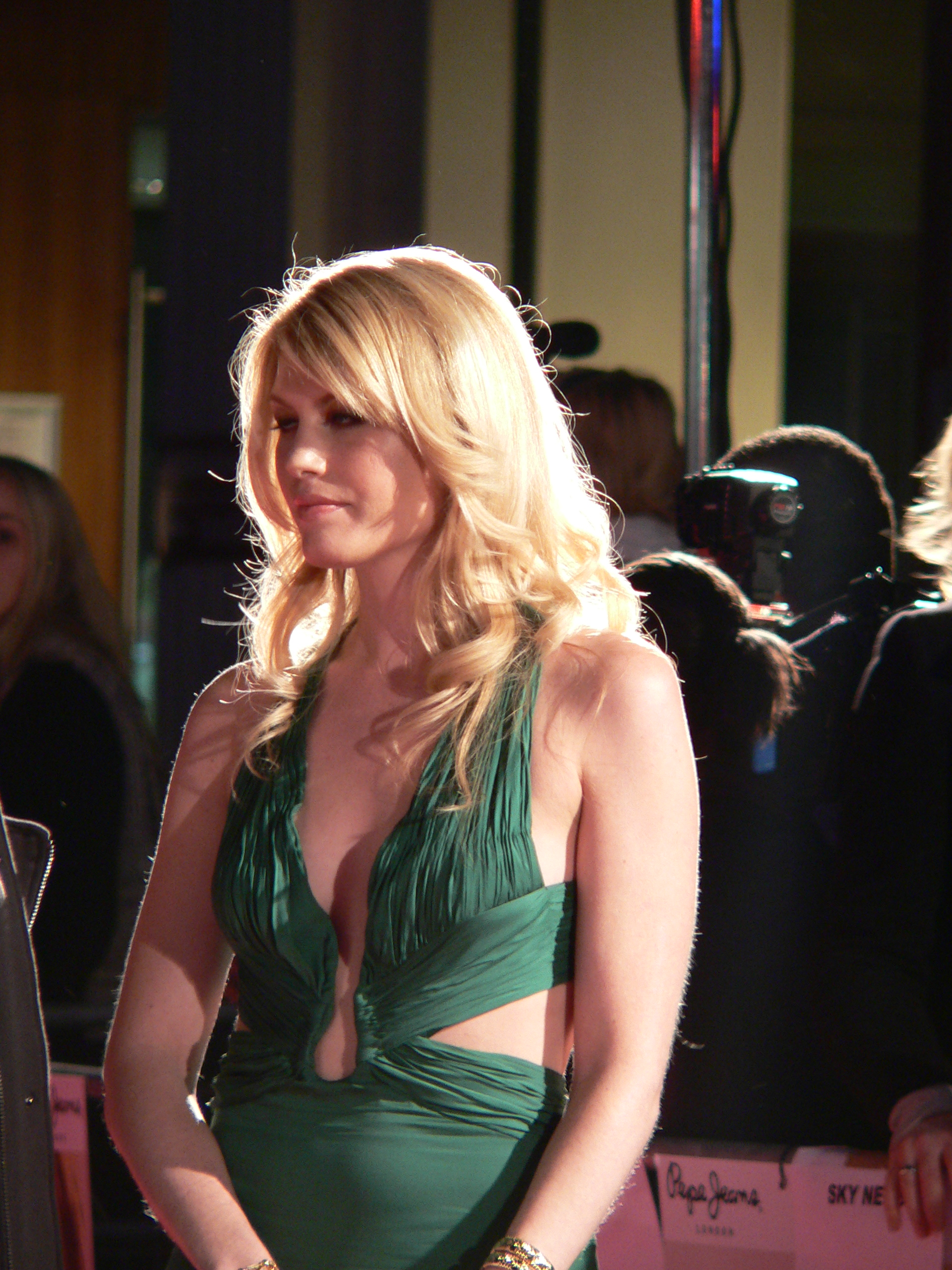
- Ostrom at the Factory Girl premiere in 2007

Meredith Ostrom is an American actress.

In March 2010 her work was included at Vegas Gallery in London's east end, in Keith Coventry's curated, Peep Show a group show of paintings and photography alongside Tracey Emin, Keith Tyson, Alison Jackson, Dan Macmillan, Henry Hudson, Matt Collishaw, Emer O'Brien and George Condo.

As an actress she played the character Joany in the 2009 film Boogie Woogie. She also appeared in the 2006 films Played and Factory Girl (playing the role of iconic German songbird/muse of Andy Warhol Nico). She starred in the 2005 short film Bizarre Love Triangle, written and directed by George Hickenlooper. She appeared in a 2000 episode of Sex and the City.

== Filmography ==
- London Town (2016) as Rebecca
- Men Don't Lie (2010) as Miriam
- Boogie Woogie (2009) as Joany
- Nine Miles Down (2009) as Susan
- The Heavy (2008) as Amanda Mason
- Feel the Noise (2007) as Noelia
- Factory Girl (2006) as Nico
- Played (2006) as Nikki
- Bizarre Love Triangle (2005) as Meredith
- The Great New Wonderful (2005) as Anita
- Naked in London (2005) as Callas
- When Will I Be Loved (2004) as Meredith
- Murder City as Inger (1 episode, 2004) - Nothing Sacred
- Keen Eddie as Dominique (3 episodes, 2003–2004)- Pilot (2003) - Stewardess Keeping Up Appearances and - Inciting Incident(2004)
- Love Actually (2003) as Billy's Video Vixen
- My Name Is Tanino (2002) as Melissa
- 'R Xmas (2001) as Elfie
- Sex and the City as Lizzie (1 episode, 2000) What Goes Around Comes Around (2000)
- Love Goggles (1999) as Em
