= Rick Spleen =

- First appearance: "Rubbish"
- Created by: Jack Dee and Pete Sinclair
- Portrayed by: Jack Dee

In-universe information
- Gender: Male
- Occupation: Comedian
- Spouse: Melanie "Mel" Davis
- Children: Sam (daughter)

Rick Spleen (born Richard Shaw) is a character in the BBC situation comedy Lead Balloon, played by comedian Jack Dee. Spleen is a world-weary comedian who is forced to make ends meet by hosting corporate events.

== Character profile ==
Rick is a short-tempered, impatient comedian who struggles to find worthwhile gigs or appearances. He spends a lot of his time writing jokes for corporate events with his friend and writer, Marty who always does far more work than Rick.

He lives in a typical London suburb house with partner Mel and daughter Sam. He is a stubborn, incompetent liar, who often attempts to avoid paying professionals by performing a task himself. He also passes off many of Marty's jokes as his own, and always aims to take credit for other people's work. In episode 2 of Season 3, "Panda", it is revealed that Spleen's real name is Richard Shaw, which caused him much grief at school due to it being shortened to 'rickshaw,' after the Chinese/Japanese transport Rickshaw.

Dee and Sinclair have said that they based the character of Spleen on "comedians who hated being comedians" with whom Dee performed as he was starting his career as a stand-up comic.

== Relationships with other characters ==
=== Marty ===
Spleen often makes fun and insults his American writer Marty, and Marty returns the gesture. However, it is made clear that the two are great friends, despite their on-going bickering. How much the pair need each other is made especially obvious in the final episode of Season 2, "Lucky", where, after Spleen accuses him of lacking ambition, Marty receives a call from America asking him to write in Hollywood. Spleen is upset but tries not to let his feelings show. However, Marty returns and decides to continue writing with Spleen.

Marty often acts as 'the good guy' when Rick sets off on his usual activity of insulting people. For example, when Spleen has an argument with Michael, the café owner, or with Magda, his Eastern-European cleaner, Marty defends them rather than backing Spleen, which appears to wind him up even more.

=== Mel ===
Mel, who works as an agent for TV performers, and Rick are partners and have a teenage daughter, Sam. However, Rick still lies to Mel to make himself look better, for example in "£5,000", after Rick is detained by police for aggravating an officer, he claims that he was "being too funny".

It appears that Mel is the only character who understands Rick, and accepts his ways, often agreeing with him or humouring him.

=== Magda ===
Rick barely tolerates the family's Eastern-European cleaner Magda. He often piles a lot of work on her and then takes the credit, for example in the season one episode "Fatty", Rick tells Magda to return a lost cat and then keeps the reward. Rick regularly gets into arguments with Magda and blames her often. He also treats her as slightly less human than everyone else, as she is from a less developed ex-Communist country, and constantly corrects her accented pronunciation of everyday words such as "sale" in which she says "sell" and "unhappy" when she says "unhippy."

In the first two episodes of Series 3, Magda has to stay in Rick's house, much to Rick's dismay. He constantly complains of her making noise, filling the fridge with her food and the fact that she has placed a fridgemagnet on the fridge amongst other things. In the series 3 episode "Karma", Rick is kind to Magda, which unnerves her. However, at the end of the episode he falls back into his ways of arguing with her.

=== Michael ===
Michael, owner of the local cafe, annoys Rick often. Michael sees Rick as a friend, however Rick does not return the sentiment. Rick often calls Michael mad, especially after he starts therapy. Rick accidentally injures Michael in the episode "£5,000", when he drives into him in his car. This results in Michael not being able to take part in the sponsored skip.

In series 3, after Mel drunkenly reveals Michael's father is gay, Rick and Marty go to Michael's home to check up on him, a gesture Michael appreciates.

=== Ben and Sam ===
Sam, Rick's daughter, and Ben, her boyfriend, often irritate Rick by asking for money from him and then wasting it. Ben annoys Rick the most, for example when he breaks Rick's DVD player after taking the back cover off and thereby breaking the security seal thus invalidating the warranty.

In series 3, Ben stays at Rick's home for an episode. Rick is annoyed by the constant loud music coming from Sam's room, as they practice for their band, 'Ben and Sam.' However, when it is revealed that an advertising agency wants to use the duo's song "Tragic", which was put up on YouTube, Rick changes his mind and starts enjoying the music.

Ben and Sam temporarily broke up in the fourth episode of series 3, which also ended their band's run.

== Production notes ==
Jack Dee, who plays Spleen, is the co-creator and one of the executive producers of Lead Balloon, therefore he writes his own part with the help of co-writer Pete Sinclair.
