= Dr. Jekyll & Mr. Hyde (2008 film) =

- DVD cover art
- Directed by: Paolo Barzman
- Written by: Paul B. Margolis; Robert Louis Stevenson
- Based on: Strange Case of Dr Jekyll and Mr Hyde
- Produced by: John Hannah
- Starring: Dougray Scott; Krista Bridges; Tom Skerritt; Danette Mackay
- Cinematography: Pierre Jodoin
- Edited by: Annie Ilkow
- Music by: FM Le Sieur
- Production company: Muse Entertainment
- Distributed by: Muse Entertainment Enterprises; RHI Entertainment
- Release dates: 2008 (UK): May 17, 2008; (US)
- Running time: 129 minutes 96 minutes (shorter version)
- Country: Canada
- Language: English
- Budget: 5 million (estimated)

Dr. Jekyll & Mr. Hyde is a Canadian film directed by Paolo Barzman and starring Dougray Scott in the title role. Based on Robert Louis Stevenson's 1886 novella Strange Case of Dr. Jekyll & Mr. Hyde, the film is set and shot in Montréal, Québec, Canada, it was released theatrically in both the US and UK in 2008, and then on DVD in 2009. It was given as "second-tier premiere" on the ION network on May 17, 2008.

== Synopsis ==
In modern day Boston, prominent medical researcher Dr. Henry Jekyll spends his evenings experimenting with a rare flower from the Amazon jungles. The natives say the flower has the power to separate the human soul into good and evil parts. After Jekyll's evil side, known as Mr. Hyde, commits a series of murders, Jekyll's DNA is found on one of the victims and he is arrested. Confined to an asylum, Jekyll realizes Hyde must be brought under control. He retains the services of attorney Claire Wheaton and tells her his story. Wheaton is skeptical until Jekyll gives her a locket worn by one of the murdered girls. Wheaton agrees to represent Jekyll and decides to argue in court that Jekyll and Hyde are two separate people and therefore should not be held responsible for each other's actions.

== Cast ==
- Dougray Scott as Dr. Henry Jekyll and Edward Hyde
- Tom Skerritt as Gabe Utterson
- Danette Mackay as Ms. Poole
- Krista Bridges as Claire Wheaton
- Jack Blumenau as Ned Chandler
- Ellen David as Detective Newcom
- Cas Anvar as D.A. McBride
- Vlasta Vrana as Judge Sheehan
- Ian Finlay as Chief of Staff
- Kathleen Fee as Mrs Lanyon
- Carlo Mestroni as Terrance Gartrell
- Ifan Meredith as Dr Arthur Lanyon
- Patrick John Costello as Walter Swain
- Susan Almgren as Mental Health Expert
- Arthur Holden as Fowler
- Gordon Masten as Bob Lanyon

== Reception ==
The film was not well received. Exclaim! called it "completely unnecessary and frequently laughable". PopMatters titled its review "A Stale Telling of an Old Tale." Variety criticized the screenplay, saying it "botched the fundamental underpinnings and purged any nuance from the story." DVD Talk compared it unfavorably with other versions of the story. The New York Times, The News Journal, and The Akron Beacon-Journal also offered their reviews.
