= Tell Tale Hearts =

Tell Tale Hearts is a BBC Scotland television miniseries drama, written by Stephen Lowe, which stars Bill Paterson and was directed by Thaddeus O'Sullivan.

The three-part psychological thriller was broadcast down on BBC1 on 1 November 1992. The serial was nominated twice in the 1993 BAFTA Scotland awards - for best drama serial and best television actor (Bill Paterson).

== Plot ==
Anthony Steadman (Paterson) is a child-murderer set to begin a new life having been released from prison after seventeen years. Sally McCann, (Bríd Brennan), a mother whose child disappeared around the time of the original murder, is pursuing Steadman to learn the truth about her missing child. Also on Steadman's trail is Becky Wilson (Emma Fielding), a local radio reporter, for whom the case brings back ghosts from her own past.

== Cast ==
- Bill Paterson as Anthony Steadman
- Emma Fielding as Becky Wilson
- Bríd Brennan as Sally McCann
- Clive Russell as Adrian Fell
- John Woodvine as John Wilson
- Morag Hood as Hilary Wilson
- Benny Young as Pete Akins
- Martin Cochrane as Mike McCann
- Dougray Scott as David Seilors
- John Fraser as Ex-Supt Walters
- Lynne Christie as Mrs. Walters
- Michael David as Rev. Jeffrey Tiller
- Vari Sylvester as Emma Johnson
- Joseph Brady as Sam
- Alastair Galbraith as Eddie
- John Straiton as Rick Peters
- Carol Ann Crawford as Maureen

== Production ==
Written By: Stephen Lowe
Producers: David Blair and Norman McCandlish
Director: Thaddeus O'Sullivan
