= Terry Fogerty =

English RL coach and former GB international rugby league footballer

Personal information
- Full name: Terence H. Fogerty
- Born: 29 June 1944 Glossop, Derbyshire, England
- Died: 17 October 2013 (aged 69) Halifax, England

Playing information
- Position: Prop, Second-row
Club
Years	Team	Pld	T	G	FG	P
1961–66	Halifax	298	65	1	0	197
1966–69	Wigan
1969–73	Halifax
1973–77	Rochdale Hornets	44	8	0	0	24
	Total	342	73	1	0	221
Representative
Years	Team	Pld	T	G	FG	P
196?–6?	Commonwealth XIII
19??–??	Lancashire	2
1966–74	Great Britain	3	0	0	0	0

Coaching information
Club
Years	Team	Gms	W	D	L	W%
1981–82	Rochdale Hornets
- Relatives: Adam Fogerty (son)

Terence "Terry" H. Fogerty (29 June 1944 – 17 October 2013) was an English professional rugby league footballer who played in the 1960s and 1970s, and coached in the 1980s. He played at representative level for Great Britain, Lancashire, and Commonwealth XIII, and at club level for Halifax (two spells), Wigan and Rochdale Hornets, as a prop or second-row, and coached at club level for Rochdale Hornets. Fogerty is a Halifax Hall of Fame Inductee.

== Background ==
Fogerty was born in Glossop, Derbyshire, and made his mark as a loose forward with Saddleworth Rangers before turning professional, he was a plasterer, later he was a landlord of several public houses in Halifax, he died aged 69 in Halifax, West Yorkshire, and his funeral took place at Halifax Minster at 11.15 am on Friday 29 November 2013.

== Professional playing career ==
=== Halifax ===
Fogerty made his début aged 16 for Halifax against Batley at Mount Pleasant, Batley on Tuesday 21 March 1961. He played at second-row, in Halifax's 10–0 victory over Featherstone Rovers in the 1963 Yorkshire Cup Final during the 1963–64 season at Belle Vue, Wakefield on Saturday 2 November 1963.

Fogerty formed a great Halifax back row combination alongside Colin Dixon and Charlie Renilson in the mid-1960s. He played, and was man of the match winning the inaugural Harry Sunderland Trophy in Halifax's 15–7 victory over St. Helens in the Championship Final during the 1964–65 season at Station Road, Swinton on Saturday 22 May 1965.

Fogerty represented Commonwealth XIII while at Halifax in 1965 against New Zealand at Crystal Palace National Recreation Centre, London on Wednesday 18 August 1965. He represented Great Britain while at Halifax in 1966 against New Zealand. Fogerty also won caps for Lancashire while at Halifax.

=== Wigan ===
After Halifax had accepted an offer of £7,500 for him in 1966 (based on increases in average earnings, this would be approximately £293,500 in 2014). Fogerty started playing for Wigan. Fogerty again represented Great Britain while at Wigan in 1967 against France. Fogerty played at second-row, in Wigan's 7–4 victory over St. Helens in the 1968 BBC2 Floodlit Trophy Final during the 1968–69 season at Central Park, Wigan on Tuesday 17 December 1968. Fogerty played in Wigan's victory in the Lancashire League during the 1969–70 season.

=== Halifax ===
Halifax bought Fogerty back for £5,500 in 1969 (based on increases in average earnings, this would be approximately £174,600 in 2014). Fogerty played in Halifax's 22–11 victory over Wakefield Trinity in the 1971–72 Player's No.6 Trophy Final during the 1971–72 season at Odsal Stadium, Bradford on Saturday 22 January 1972. He finished his second stint at Halifax at prop, from where he scored a record 12 tries in the 1972–73 season.

=== Rochdale Hornets ===
Fogerty had a spell with Rochdale Hornets, who paid £7,000 in 1973 for his services (based on increases in average earnings, this would be approximately £139,100 in 2014). Fogerty played at second-row, in Rochdale Hornets' 16–27 defeat by Warrington in the 1973–74 Player's No.6 Trophy Final during the 1973–74 season at Central Park, Wigan on Saturday 9 February 1974. Fogerty again represented Great Britain while at Rochdale Hornets in 1974 against France.

== Coaching career ==
From May 1981 till January 1982 Fogerty was the coach of Rochdale Hornets.

== Personal life ==
Terry Fogerty was married to Cheryl, they had children: the boxer, rugby league footballer, and actor; Adam Fogerty, and the basketball player, and rugby league footballer; Jason Fogerty.
