= Boogie Woogie (film) =

2009 film by Duncan Ward

- Theatrical release poster
- Directed by: Duncan Ward
- Screenplay by: Danny Moynihan
- Based on: Boogie Woogie by Danny Moynihan
- Produced by: Danny Moynihan; Kami Naghdi; Christopher Simon; Cat Villiers
- Starring: Gillian Anderson; Alan Cumming; Heather Graham; Danny Huston; Christopher Lee; Joanna Lumley; Charlotte Rampling; Amanda Seyfried; Stellan Skarsgård; Jaime Winstone
- Cinematography: John Mathieson
- Edited by: Kant Pan
- Music by: Janusz Podrazik
- Production companies: The Works International; Constance Media; Firefly Films; Muse Productions; P&C Arcade Films; Piccadilly Pictures; Autonomous; Colourframe; S Films
- Distributed by: Vertigo Films
- Release dates: 26 June 2009 (EIFF); 16 April 2010 (United Kingdom)
- Running time: 94 minutes
- Country: United Kingdom
- Language: English
- Budget: $6 million
- Box office: $47,527

Boogie Woogie is a 2009 British black comedy film directed by Duncan Ward and produced by Eric Eisner and Leonid Rozhetskin. It is based on the 2000 novel of the same name by Danny Moynihan, who adapted his own book on the New York art world of the 1990s and titled it based on the unfinished 1944 Piet Mondrian painting Victory Boogie-Woogie.

The film stars Gillian Anderson, Alan Cumming, Heather Graham, Danny Huston, Christopher Lee, Joanna Lumley, Charlotte Rampling, Amanda Seyfried, Stellan Skarsgård and Jaime Winstone. It premiered on 26 June 2009 at the Edinburgh International Film Festival.

== Plot ==
Boogie Woogie is a comedy of manners, its cast of characters devouring each other in a small world awash with big money. Set against the backdrop of contemporary London and the international art scene, it casts an eye over the appetites and morality of some of its major players. Dealers, collectors, artists, and wannabes vie with each other in a world in which success and downfall rest on a thin edge.

== Cast ==
- Gillian Anderson as Jean Maclestone
- Alan Cumming as Dewey Dalamanatousis
- Heather Graham as Beth Freemantle
- Danny Huston as Art Spindle
- Christopher Lee as Mr Alfred Rhinegold
- Joanna Lumley as Mrs Alfreda Rhinegold
- Charlotte Rampling as Emille
- Amanda Seyfried as Paige Oppenheimer
- Stellan Skarsgård as Bob Maclestone
- Jaime Winstone as Elaine
- Simon McBurney as Robert Freign
- Meredith Ostrom as Joany
- Gemma Atkinson as Charlotte Bailey
- Jan Uddin as Art's Partner
- Jack Huston as Jo Richards

== Production ==
Danny Moynihan's novel for Boogie Woogie was published in 2000, based on his hedonistic New York years.

I hoped it would be a film from the start, and even wrote it in an Altman-esque way, like Short Cuts, but it took ten years.

— Moynihan, on his novel and the film.

Dennis Hopper originally held the option to adapt the novel into a screenplay for a film to be set in New York City; later, Moynihan's friend, Duncan Ward, a documentary filmmaker, became involved, with Rachel Weisz agreeing to play the "central, nubile gallerist" role eventually portrayed by Graham.

After Weisz dropped out, producers switched the film's location to London for cost reasons; Moynihan "discovered then-unknown Amanda Seyfried living around the corner in Chelsea" and got her cast as an "art-world nymphet"; Charlotte Rampling, a family friend of Moynihan's, makes a cameo appearance. Principal photography took place in London in December 2006.

== Reception ==
On the review aggregator website Rotten Tomatoes, 32% of 25 critics' reviews are positive, with an average rating of 4.4/10.

Richard Clayton—in a Sunday Times article about the film that focuses on "who inspired its unsavoury characters"—called it "The Devil Wears Prada and Hangs Out at Private Views, but with a lot more sex and naughty bits." According to a National Public Radio review, "just about all the acting in this otherwise pedestrian satire is fabulous, and for want of other diversions you might amuse yourself itemizing all the squandered talent"; the film conflates "black comedy with cynicism" and "ends, dispiritingly, pretty much where it began." The Daily Beast called it a "dead-on satire of the contemporary art world that is loved by the very audience it savages." Rex Reed called it a "tepid spoof that only occasionally evokes a reluctant smile" and said it "failed to capture the nuances or craft a more brutal, incisive exposé of the art milieu."
