= Lead Balloon =

British television series

- Lead Balloon Series 1 title card. The misspelling of "balloon" was a genuine mistake by director Alex Hardcastle.
- Genre: Sitcom
- Created by: Jack Dee; Pete Sinclair
- Directed by: Alex Hardcastle
- Starring: Jack Dee; Raquel Cassidy; Sean Power; Anna Crilly; Antonia Campbell-Hughes; Tony Gardner; Rasmus Hardiker
- Ending theme: "One Way Road" by Paul Weller/Written by Noel Gallagher
- Country of origin: United Kingdom
- Original language: English
- No. of series: 4
- No. of episodes: 27 (list of episodes)

Production
- Executive producers: Addison Cresswell; Andrew Beint; Lucy Lumsden
- Producer: Alex Hardcastle
- Editor: Russell Beeden
- Camera setup: Single-camera
- Running time: approx. 29 minutes
- Production company: Open Mike Productions

Original release
- Network: BBC Four (2006); BBC Two (2007–2011)
- Release: 4 October 2006 – 5 July 2011

Lead Balloon is a British sitcom television series produced by Open Mike Productions for BBC Four. The series was created and is co-written by comedian Jack Dee and Pete Sinclair. It stars Dee as Rick Spleen, a cynical and misanthropic comedian whose life is plagued by petty annoyances, disappointments and embarrassments. Raquel Cassidy, Sean Power and Tony Gardner also star. The first series of six episodes was broadcast on BBC Four in 2006, with the first episode achieving the highest ratings for a comedy on the channel. Repeats of the series were run on BBC Two and BBC HD, bringing it to a larger audience. The second series of eight episodes aired on BBC Two from November 2007; the third series aired from November 2008; and the final series aired from 31 May 2011 until 5 July.

Comparisons were made by critics to the successful American comedy Curb Your Enthusiasm, and positive comments were made about Lead Balloon's characters, particularly Anna Crilly's Magda, the Eastern European housekeeper. The first series was released on DVD on 12 November 2007. The show's theme tune is a cover version of "One Way Road", written by Noel Gallagher and performed by Paul Weller.

== Production ==
=== Development ===
The genesis of the series came towards the end of recording the 2005 series of Jack Dee Live at the Apollo, when Dee speculated as to whether his experiences of "witless" interviews could be turned into a television programme. Following a meeting with his agent, in which he turned down the lead role in a series, Dee began writing the character that would become Rick Spleen. He focused the writing on Spleen's domestic life, rather than his professional, but did highlight the clash between the two. A pilot, commissioned by BBC Four and recorded in December 2005, received positive feedback and led to a full series of six 30-minute episodes being ordered in January 2006 for broadcast later in the year.

=== Writing ===
Dee's frequent collaborator Pete Sinclair joined him to write the pilot script. The two worked for two weeks developing the characters and forming storylines from them, which prepared them for writing the series proper when it was commissioned. The two were strongly influenced in their writing by the "paradigm shift" of The Office that made "natural conversation" funny without a studio audience being present. Dee cites the early films of Woody Allen, Seinfeld and Curb Your Enthusiasm as other "cultural influences" that helped set the tone of the series. Controller of BBC Four Janice Hadlow stated the series was in the "same ballpark" as Curb, though it is not quite as autobiographical. The name Lead Balloon comes from the expression "To go down like a lead balloon", meaning to be received badly by an audience.

=== Filming ===
The never-broadcast pilot features a scene with Omid Djalili as a dry cleaner, which was reused in the fifth episode, "Pistachio". Location filming for the first two series, particularly Rick and Mel's house, was done in Willesden. Michael's cafe used Gracelands Cafe in Kensal Green for the first two series, and Hugo's restaurant in Lonsdale Road, Queen's Park, London for the third. Most moped shots in the third series were filmed in Ladbroke Grove. Scenes are separated by the insertion of a person writing ideas for comedy material on a writing pad.

== Characters ==
In a scene from "£5000", after crushing Michael's legs with his car, Rick (centre) incompetently tries to lie his way out of the situation when questioned by a Police Community Support Officer, while Marty (right) stands by in disbelief.

Dee's character Rick Spleen (born Richard Shaw) is a stand-up comedian living in London who struggles to get decent gigs and makes ends meet by hosting corporate events such as the Frozen Goods Awards Evening. Dee and Sinclair based the character on the "comedians who hated being comedians" who performed alongside Dee in his early years of stand-up. Rick is a habitual and incompetent liar who often attempts practical tasks himself in an attempt to avoid paying professionals.

His partner Mel (Raquel Cassidy) is a talent agent whose clientele of everyday people getting their 15 minutes of fame serves to highlight Rick's failing career. Her calm, perceptive and considerate personality contrasts strongly with Rick's.

Rick's American co-writer, Marty (Sean Power), writes the majority of Rick's material, often working with him at Rick's home or Michael's café. Though he tries to moderate Rick's desperate behaviour, he is quietly frustrated with him, and conspires against Rick's interests.

Michael (Tony Gardner) owns and runs the café that Rick and Marty frequently visit to escape the chaos of Rick's home. He is socially awkward, possibly to the extent of having a mental disorder, although he was actually a high-flying city banker who suffered from burn-out. His father turns out to be gay in later series, to which Michael reacts negatively.

Rick's daughter Sam (Antonia Campbell-Hughes) attends sixth form college and regularly extracts money from her father, often by expressing sympathy at his misfortunes. This money is always around forty pounds, and is possibly being used for the purchase of recreational drugs.

Sam's slacker boyfriend Ben (Rasmus Hardiker) goes through numerous jobs and interests in the first series, such as taking a circus skills course, and a short-lived shelf-stacking job, however these apparent jobs require a recurring amount of forty pounds (which is gained from Rick through Sam's pleas), which may in fact be used to purchase recreational drugs, meaning the jobs and interests may not exist at all.

Magda (Anna Crilly) is the Spleens' morose Eastern European housekeeper, who is often puzzled by British attitudes, language and, in her view, softness. She is a willing worker and generally suffers Rick's selfish eccentricities in sullen silence.

Neighbour Clive (John Biggins) had a part in a single scene in the first series, but had a larger part in an episode of the second series; by the third series he had become a prominent character, concerned about the well-being of his elderly mother who is very delicate and has had problems with losing her cat and having teenagers throwing rubbish over her wall.

== Episodes ==
| Series | Episodes | Originally released | | |
| Series | Episodes | First released | Last released | Network |
|---|---|---|---|---|
| 1 | 6 | 4 October 2006 | 8 November 2006 | BBC Four |
| 2 | 8 | 15 November 2007 | 3 January 2008 | BBC Two |
| 3 | 7 | 13 November 2008 | 23 December 2008 | BBC Two |
| 4 | 6 | 31 May 2011 | 5 July 2011 | BBC Two |

== Reception ==
Immediately following the commission of the series, reviewers compared it to Curb Your Enthusiasm; a story in The Independent ran with the headline "Dee writes BBC's answer to Curb Your Enthusiasm". The Stage's Mark Wright called it "a curious oddity" and called comparisons to Curb "inevitable". Ian Johns of The Times "obsessed" over the similarities to Curb, though singled out Crilly and Gardner for their performances, and described Dee's characterisation of Rick as "turning childish pettiness into something almost endearing".

A. A. Gill, in The Sunday Times, wryly praised the style of humour and the reaction it provoked in viewers. Hermione Eyre of The Independent on Sunday called it "a delectable comedy of everyday embarrassment", but "unfortunately, Lead Balloon shows awkward joints where Curb Your Enthusiasm has invisible seams"; the reviewer cited Larry David as being a good man driven to obnoxious behaviour, whereas Spleen is just obnoxious. Thomas Sutcliffe of The Independent named the series the best new comedy of 2006.

When appearing on a panel of comedy judges at the 2007 Edinburgh International Television Festival, Frank Skinner, in response to The Vicar of Dibley and The Catherine Tate Show being voted the best comedies in a public poll, called it "the best sitcom that anyone from the comedy circuit has done [...] Obviously I was hoping it would be shit" (Skinner starred in his own failed sitcom, Shane in 2004).

The first episode broke BBC Four's audience record for a comedy series, with 383,000 viewers. Despite dropping to 199,000 by the third episode, it still won a multi-channel slot. "Rubbish"'s BBC Two repeat received 2.1 million viewers, with 122,000 seeing "Allergic" afterwards on BBC Four. The final episode of the first series, "Fatty", received 2.3 million for its BBC Two repeat.

The first series was nominated for a British Comedy Award in 2007, with Dee also nominated for best comedy actor.

== Series information ==
=== Broadcast history ===
The first series aired on BBC Four between 4 October and 8 November 2006 in the 10:30 p.m. timeslot. The ratings success of the first episodes led to the series having a repeat run on BBC Two, starting on 26 October. A second series of eight episodes was commissioned by the controller of BBC Two following the conclusion of the first series. The third series began on 13 November 2008. The fourth series premiered on BBC 2 on 31 May 2011.

Lead Balloon was the first comedy series to be broadcast on the BBC's high-definition service, BBC HD, with another repeat run beginning on 21 December 2006. Episodes were also made available as streaming downloads on bbc.co.uk during the first series run.

Jack Dee announced during an interview on Alan Carr: Chatty Man that a fourth series was in the works. Shooting finished in Autumn 2010 and the series began its broadcast run on 31 May 2011 in the UK on BBC2 at 10 p.m.

In Australia, series one and two were first aired back-to-back on ABC1 each Tuesday at 8pm from 3 February 2009 until 7 April when the network shifted the remaining episodes to the later 9:30 p.m. slot until 5 May 2009. Both seasons have since been repeated on the lower-rated ABC2 channel and uploaded to the ABC iView catch-up service. Series three is yet to air in Australia.

In Sweden, series two was aired on SVT1 from the ninth of July 2012: Series 3 and 4 were aired in the Autumn of the same year.

=== DVD releases ===
The first series was released on DVD on 12 November 2007 and the second on 24 November 2008. The third and fourth series were released on 6 June 2011 and 11 July 2011 respectively. All 4 series were also released as a DVD boxset on 11 July 2011.
