= Nigel Mead =

British magician and television consultant (born 1974)

- Born: May 1974 (age 51); Rochester, Kent, England
- Occupations: Magician; Television consultant; Writer; Producer
- Years active: 2003–present
- Known for: Magic consultant and co-writer on Tricked

Nigel Mead (born May 1974) is a British magician, television consultant, writer and producer. He is known for co-creating the ITV hidden-camera magic series Tricked, on which he also served as a magic producer. The programme won at the 2014 Broadcast Digital Awards.

He is also known for appearing as the lead magician mentor in the Channel 4 special Faking It: Physicist to Magician (2005), and for television consulting work on productions including Skins, The Royal Variety Performance, Britain's Got Talent, and Dancing on Ice.

Mead is a member of The Magic Circle and was invited to become a member of the Inner Magic Circle with Gold Star in 2014.

== Early life and education ==
Mead was born in Rochester, Kent, England. He developed an interest in magic at the age of ten and frequently visited Davenport’s Magic Shop in London while learning sleight-of-hand techniques.

== Career ==
=== Early television work ===
Mead began appearing on British television in 2003 as a guest magician and presenter on programmes for Nickelodeon UK and Discovery Kids.

In 2005 he appeared as the lead magician mentor in Faking It: Physicist to Magician, a Channel 4 special in the Faking It series. The programme followed physics student Kevin McMahon as he trained to perform as a magician before a panel of judges from The Magic Circle.

Mead later appeared in the Channel 4 series Freaky, and also worked on children's programming including Get Tricky and the Discovery series Cre-8.

=== Tricked ===
In 2013 Mead co-created the ITV2 hidden-camera magic series Tricked, presented by Ben Hanlin.

The programme ran from 2013 to 2016. In 2014 it won at the Broadcast Digital Awards.

=== Other television work ===
Mead has worked as a magic consultant, writer, producer or performer on various television productions, including Skins, Under Pressure, Impossible, The Royal Variety Performance, Britain's Got Talent, Wedding Day Winners, and Dancing on Ice.

== Professional affiliations ==
- Member of the Inner Magic Circle with Gold Star (2014)

== Selected filmography ==
- Faking It: Physicist to Magician (2005)
- Freaky (2005–2006)
- Played (2006)
- Cre-8 (2007)
- Skins (2009)
- Under Pressure (2011)
- Card Shark (2013)
- Tricked (2013–2016)
- The Royal Variety Performance (2015)
- Britain's Got Talent (2017)
- Wedding Day Winners (2018)
- Dancing on Ice (2020)
