= Adam Fogerty =

English rugby league footballer, boxer and actor

Personal information
- Full name: Adam Heywood Fogerty
- Born: 6 March 1969 (age 57) Halifax, West Riding of Yorkshire, England

Playing information
- Height: 6 ft 4 in (193 cm)
- Position: Forward
Club
Years	Team	Pld	T	G	FG	P
1991–93	Halifax	?	7	0	0	28
1993–97	St. Helens	69	13	0	0	52
1998	Warrington Wolves	4	0	0	0	0
1998	Keighley Cougars	6	0	0	0	0
	Total		20	0	0	80
- Boxing career
- Nationality: British
- Weight: Heavyweight
- Education: Ballakermeen Junior High School; Douglas High School
- Father: Terry Fogerty

Boxing record
- Total fights: 19
- Wins: 18
- Losses: 1
- Draws: 0
- No contests: 0

Adam Heywood Fogerty (born 6 March 1969) is an English actor and former boxer and rugby league footballer. He is the son of rugby league footballer Terry Fogerty, who played in the 1960s and 1970s then coached in the 1980s.

== Early life ==
Fogerty was born in Halifax, West Riding of Yorkshire, England. In the early 1980s, the family moved to the Isle of Man with Fogerty attending Ballakermeen Junior High School and latterly Douglas High School. At the age of 15 years, Fogerty became the youngest person to represent the Isle of Man on the rugby field.

== Boxing ==
Fogerty's boxing career saw him facing a number of opponents, including John Fury, on Fury's Pro debut. He twice faced Paul Lister, with their first meeting in 1989 handing Fogerty his first and only loss in a 6-round decision. He repaid the favour with an 8th-round knockout of Lister the next year.

== Rugby league ==
After ending his boxing career, Fogerty joined Halifax. He also played for Warrington, and won a Super League medal with St. Helens.

Fogerty is a founder of Super League side Toronto Wolfpack.

Beginning around the same time as his rugby league career, Fogerty began acting and has played supporting roles in several films such as Shooting Fish and Played, as well as the unlicensed boxer, Gorgeous George, in the Guy Ritchie crime caper Snatch. He played Mouse in Mean Machine and Raw in Greenfingers. He has also worked on soaps Coronation Street and Hollyoaks. In 2012, he joined Barrie Rutter's Northern Broadsides theatre company to play Costard in Shakespeare's Love's Labour's Lost.

== Acting ==
Since 1992, Fogerty has had numerous film and television roles. His television appearances include that of Ken Fairbrother, a rugby player turned wrestler in Yorkshire Television's drama series Heartbeat, whilst his most notable film part was as unlicensed boxer Gorgeous George in Guy Ritchie's film Snatch; in which he appeared alongside Brad Pitt.

in 2015, fogerty played a part in the “legend” a movie about the kray twins he was “pat connolly”

In 2019, Fogerty was cast as an 'emergency plumber' for the British insurance company Direct Line. A television commercial starring Harvey Keitel.

== Other ventures ==
In 2020, Fogerty opened a fish and chip shop in Halifax, England.

== Filmography ==
Film
Year	Title	Role	Notes
1992	The Power of One	Andress Malan	
1996	Brassed Off	Miner	
1997	Shooting Fish	Bruiser	
1997	The Man Who Knew Too Little	Newman	
1997	Incognito	Ugo	
1998	Up 'n' Under	Wayne	
1998	Little Voice	Bouncer	
2000	Purely Belter	Zak	
2000	Snatch	Gorgeous George	
2000	Greenfingers	Raw	
2001	Mean Machine	Mouse	
2004	Gladiatress	Wolf's claw	
2005	Submerged	O'Hearn	Direct-to-video release
2006	Played	Big Frankie	
2007	Stardust	Pirate	
2009	Assault of Darkness	Bog Body	Alternative title: Legend of the Bog
2010	No Ordinary Trifle	Terry	
2010	The Heavy	Tony	
2014	Bait	Si	
2015	Legend	Big Pat	
2017	”Gloves Off”	Big Bill Brady	
2018	Walk Like A Panther	Danny Dixon	

Television
Year	Title	Role	Notes
1995	Coronation Street	Hitman	1 episode
1995	Coogan's Run	Ian Parry	1 episode
1995, 1996	Heartbeat	Ken Fairbrother	2 episodes
1998	Emmerdale	Jez Hudson	4 episodes
1999	Queer as Folk	Roger Clements	1 episode
2000	City Central	Ed the Dog	1 episodes
2001	Jack and the Beanstalk: The Real Story	Forensic Doctor	TV film
2002, 2006	Ultimate Force	Rostrum/Taras Rustum	2 episodes
2003	The Royal	Bernie	Episode: Dead Air
2008	Casualty	Paul 'Cutsy' Cusick	Episode: Diamond Dogs
2008	Doctors	Syd Harrington	1 episode
2009	Hollyoaks	Johnny Bishop	1 episode
2017	Hollyoaks	Butler	2 episodes
2019	Coronation Street	Prison officer	TBC
2023	The Gallows Pole	James Broadbent	Three-part TV series
2024	Brassic		Episode: "The Mark"
