= The Work Experience =

- Genre: Reality mockumentary
- Created by: Michael Livingstone; Tom Thostrup; Claudia Webster
- Starring: Kate Miles; Sean Power; Diane Morgan; Ryan Sampson
- Narrated by: Tom Chadbon
- Country of origin: United Kingdom
- Original language: English
- No. of series: 1
- No. of episodes: 6

Production
- Executive producers: Tom Thostrup; Hilary Stewart
- Producer: Sam Martin
- Editors: Mark Williams; Philip Lepherd
- Running time: 30 minutes
- Production company: 2LE Media

Original release
- Network: E4
- Release: 24 October – 28 November 2012

The Work Experience is a British comedy series that mixes the reality television, sitcom, mockumentary and prank show formats. It began on 24 October 2012 on E4. It was created by Michael Livingstone, Tom Thostrup and Claudia Webster and written by Rhodri Crooks, Tom Forbes, Livingstone, Sam Martin and Thostrup. Set in the madness of new fashion PR agency Grade PR, each week the show follows two ambitious interns as they embark on a week of tasks, tantrums and tears. However, unknown to them, the entire agency is fictional and the employees are actors.

== Main cast/characters ==
=== Joanna Grade ===
- Played by Kate Miles

Joanna is highly-strung, self-obsessed, but most importantly, well-dressed. Having had several bites at the fashion cherry, she has decided to set up a PR agency in her own image. She is demanding, clueless and prone to disasters that are always someone else's fault. No longer in the first flush of youth and having spent twenty years fawning over a husband who left her for another man, this ice queen has decided that now is the time for her to be a mother and will stop at nothing to get herself the perfect baby.

=== Colby Brown ===
- Played by Sean Power

Chancer, sleaze and compulsive liar, Colby has spent the past twenty years creating dodgy deals and pretending to his ex-wife, Joanna, that he is gay. Colby will lie and cheat to get what he wants, using his American charm and his self-perceived sexual prowess to get around Joanna and the rest of the Grade employees. Colby is money-hungry and after an easy ride.

=== Shussi ===
- Played by Ryan Sampson

The creative tour de force behind Grade PR, Shussi is a highly sensitive artist, whose canvas is himself. He lives for fashion and feels things very deeply when they go wrong, which they do, all the time. As such he spends a lot of time crying in clothes rails, which could really smudge his eye make-up if he's not careful.

=== Susan Butler ===
- Played by Diane Morgan

Joanna's long-suffering PA, Susan, is a dowdy thirty-something that Joanna keeps around as a reminder not to let herself go. Susan bears the brunt of all of Grade PR's disasters as well as being Joanna's personal punch bag and looking after her own terminally ill mother.

== Episodes ==
#	Episode	Original airdate	Interns	Celebrity guests
1	Episode One	24 October 2012	Thomas & Aquila	Lethal Bizzle
Unknown to the eager new interns, the entire agency is fictional and the employees are a cleverly cast mix of talented actors: Devil Wears Prada-type Joanna Grade and her three extreme members of staff - Joanna's brash ex-husband and business partner Colby, her walking diary Susan, and opinionated and flamboyant creative force Shussi. The first new interns, Thomas and Aquila are thrilled to learn that Grade PR promotes a new clothing collection designed by rap superstar Lethal Bizzle. Unfortunately, an accident with a steamer and an indecent proposal combine to produce a photoshoot that Thomas and Aquila will never forget. At the end of the episode, the fictional element is revealed to Thomas and Aquila, whose efforts are rewarded by a full month's paid placement, giving them invaluable first-hand experience at a real fashion PR agency.
2	Episode Two	31 October 2012	JJ & Zoyia	Jason Gardiner, Michaela Strachan
In this second episode, interns JJ and Zoyia join Grade PR to help market a brand of fake fur discovered by dodgy-dealing Colby. Shussi is in his element arranging for his new boyfriend, Dancing on Ice's Jason Gardiner, to wear the coat to a celebrity event. However, mayhem breaks out when some royal underwear goes missing, leading to an inappropriate eBay sale, and a raging Michaela Strachan intervenes with the fake fur coat plan. Will all the hysteria stop JJ and Zoyia making the event a success?
3	Episode Three	7 November 2012	Felicity & Shaz	Simon Webbe
In this episode, Felicity and Shaz enter Grade PR's mad fashion world. Colby gives hot new designer Tom Codd's sample collection to a mysterious Chinese lady for 'safe keeping'. Meanwhile, broody Joanna is awaiting a different type of 'sample' from Blue's Simon Webbe. Needless to say, the interns are put through their paces as Shaz joins in the fight to retrieve the sample collection from the criminal underworld, while Felicity is left to help Joanna juggle the effects of gravity on her uterus!
4	Episode Four	14 November 2012	Brave & Danni	Nikki Grahame
In this fourth episode, interns Brave and Danni enter the mad world of Grade PR. It's a big week and everyone in the office is in their element, especially new staff addition Dominic. Keira Knightley has agreed to wear one of Grade's designer's dresses to a premiere! However, Dominic has given it to former Big Brother contestant Nikki Grahame. Danni has her own problems when she is forced to deal with an awkward love triangle and a host of other dramas, with Grade heading towards PR armageddon.
5	Episode Five	21 November 2012	Junior & Sarah	Kimberly Wyatt
Junior and Sarah join the crazy world of Grade PR, where the agency is putting on a huge event for cosmetics giant Benefit, and Pussycat Doll Kimberly Wyatt is booked to add some celebrity sparkle. Meanwhile, Joanna and Colby have a very important interview with an adoption agent. However, after a surprise visit from Joanna's secret son and a massive hissy fit from Kimberly Wyatt, it's left to Junior and Sarah to save the day.
6	Episode Six	28 November 2012	Rachel & Sam	Gemma Cairney, Calum Best, Sinitta
It's Grade PR's biggest fashion event to date, but new interns Rachel and Sam discover that the agency has been blacklisted by every modelling agency in the country. Fortunately, Colby has drafted in some beautiful girls to fit the bill. During the catwalk build-up, Sam assists Shussi and the police in an undercover operation, while Rachel plays matchmaker to Susan and a graphic designer. Celebrity guests Gemma Cairney and Calum Best arrive for the show, but with Sinitta's attempt to gate-crash the party and the undercover police waiting to swoop, can the interns hold it together?

== Reception ==
The Work Experience has received some negative reviews. Ben Lyons of Intern Aware argues that the "cheap" series exploits the real life desperation of people chasing job "opportunities" at any cost. Caroline Mortimer of The Independent argues that the show humiliated young people looking for work.
