= Dougray Scott =

Scottish actor (born 1965)

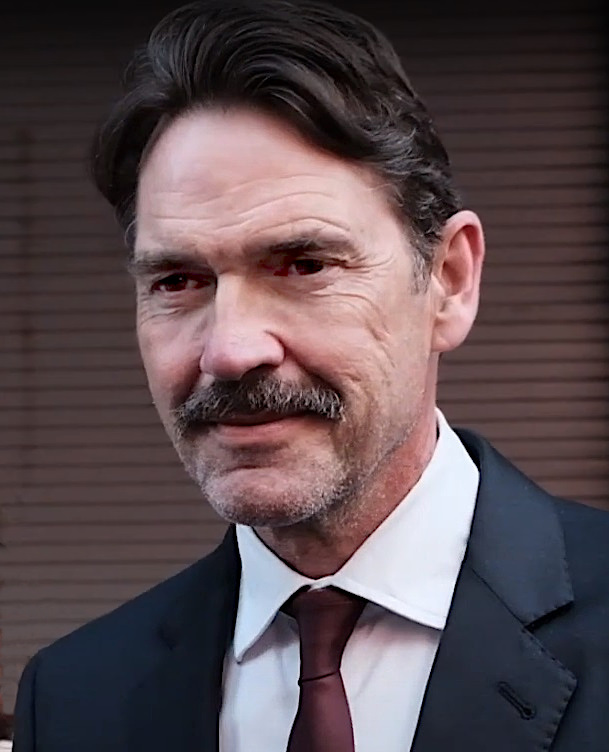
- Scott at TIFF 2023
- Born: Stephen Dougray Scott; 25 November 1965 (age 60); Glenrothes, Fife, Scotland
- Occupation: Actor
- Years active: 1983–present
- Spouses: Sarah Trevis (m. 2000; div. 2005) Claire Forlani (m. 2007)
- Children: 3

Stephen Dougray Scott (born 25 November 1965) is a Scottish actor. He has appeared in the films Twin Town (1997), Ever After (1998), Mission: Impossible 2 (2000), Enigma (2001), Ripley's Game (2002), Hitman (2007), and My Week with Marilyn (2011). He is a recipient of the International Emmy Award for Best Actor and a BAFTA Scotland Award for his performance in the Scottish crime drama series Crime (2021).

== Early life and education ==
Scott was born in Glenrothes, Fife, on 25 November 1965. He was born the youngest of four children to Elma, a nurse, and Allan Scott, a travelling salesman and former actor.

He attended Auchmuty High School and later Kirkcaldy College, where he studied drama. He went on to study at the Welsh College of Music and Drama in Cardiff, Wales, where he received an award for most promising drama student. Scott took his stage name from his grandmother's surname, Dougray, when he joined Equity, because there was already a Stephen Scott registered.

== Career ==
Scott began his acting career in national theatre, television, and puppet shows. His breakout role came on stage in a play called Unidentified Human Remains and the True Nature of Love. His early television credits include Taggart, Lovejoy, Tell Tale Hearts, Stay Lucky, Soldier Soldier, The Crow Road. His first major film role was in 1997’s dark comedy Twin Town, set in Swansea, Wales. His international breakthrough came the following year when he played Prince Henry to Drew Barrymore’s Cinderella in Ever After. Scott played the villain in Mission: Impossible 2 (and was selected to do so by Tom Cruise). He was cast to play Wolverine in the feature film version of X-Men, but Mission: Impossible 2 went over schedule, and he was injured in a motorbike accident while shooting the chase scene. He was forced to drop out of the project and was replaced by Hugh Jackman in X-Men. Scott turned down the chance to play Aragorn in the Lord Of The Rings trilogy, as he didn’t fancy spending two years filming three movies back to back in New Zealand.

In 2001, he played the hero in the film adaptation of the Robert Harris novel Enigma, for which he met leading mathematicians to understand the mechanics of code-breaking. In 2002, he appeared in the film adaptation of the Patricia Highsmith novel Ripley's Game with John Malkovich. After the 2002 release of Die Another Day, Scott was a candidate to replace Pierce Brosnan as James Bond. Despite the numerous reports that Eon Productions was leaning towards naming Scott as the new Bond in the 007 adventure Casino Royale, the role eventually went to Daniel Craig. In January 2006, he appeared in the miniseries The Ten Commandments as Moses. He also appeared in the NBC series Heist, which aired in March 2006 for five episodes. From 2006 until 2007, he starred in the third season of Desperate Housewives as Teri Hatcher's character's new love interest. In 2007, he played the primary antagonist in the film Hitman, based on the Hitman video games. He appeared in the title role(s) of a modern re-telling of Dr Jekyll and Mr Hyde. In May 2009, it was announced that he was to play ex-con Michael O' Connor in the new RTÉ-ITV drama Father & Son.

Scott starred in The Day of the Triffids. The drama was broadcast in December 2009 as part of the BBC One Christmas schedule. In 2011, Scott featured in the film Love's Kitchen alongside his wife Claire Forlani. In April 2011, Scott portrayed football manager Matt Busby in the BBC TV drama United, which was centred on the Munich air disaster of 1958, in which Busby was badly injured but survived. Also in 2011, he portrayed Arthur Miller in biographical drama My Week with Marilyn. In 2013, he guest starred as para-psychological researcher/ghost hunter Alec Palmer in the Doctor Who episode "Hide". In 2014, Scott portrayed the main villain in Taken 3.

In March 2016, Scott became the voice of Orby in adverts for the oil and gas company BP. In April 2016, Scott appeared in the second season of Fear the Walking Dead as Thomas Abigail, Victor Strand's business partner and lover. In 2019, Scott joined the CW series Batwoman as Jacob Kane, the title character's father, set in the Arrowverse. He left the series during its second season. He appeared on the show Crime, for which he won a BAFTA Scotland Award and an International Emmy Award. In 2025, Scott played in the Netflix movie Exterritorial his first German-speaking role alongside Jeanne Goursaud.

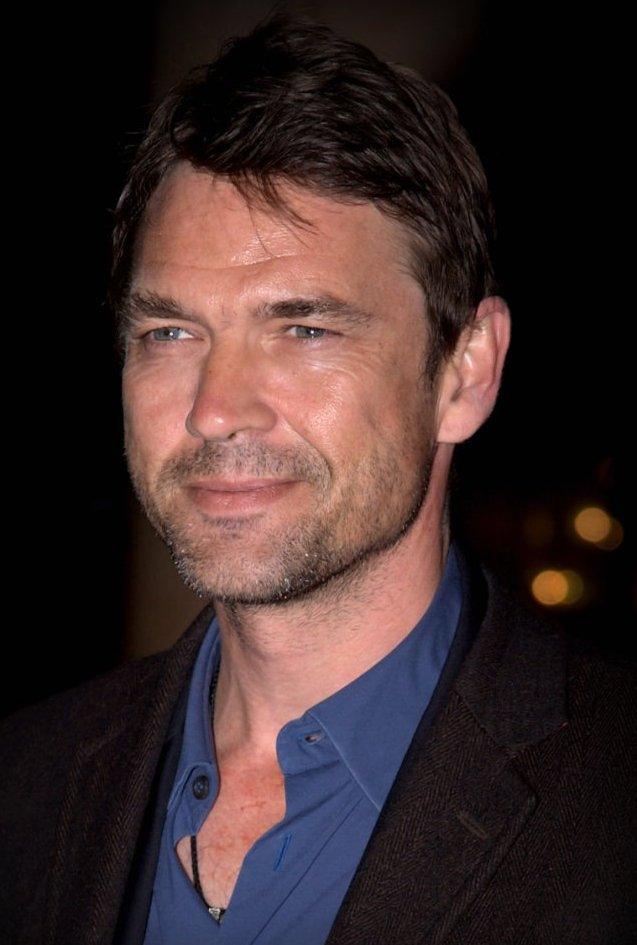
Scott in 2010

== Personal life ==
Scott is the father of twins with former wife Sarah Trevis. On 8 June 2007, he married actress Claire Forlani in Italy. They have a son.

Scott is a fan of Hibernian Football Club, stemming from a grand-uncle being a scout for the team. Three maternal great-uncles were football referees, Tom Dougray being the most prominent.

== Politics ==
Scott is in favour of Scottish independence, a socialist, and a republican.

== Filmography ==
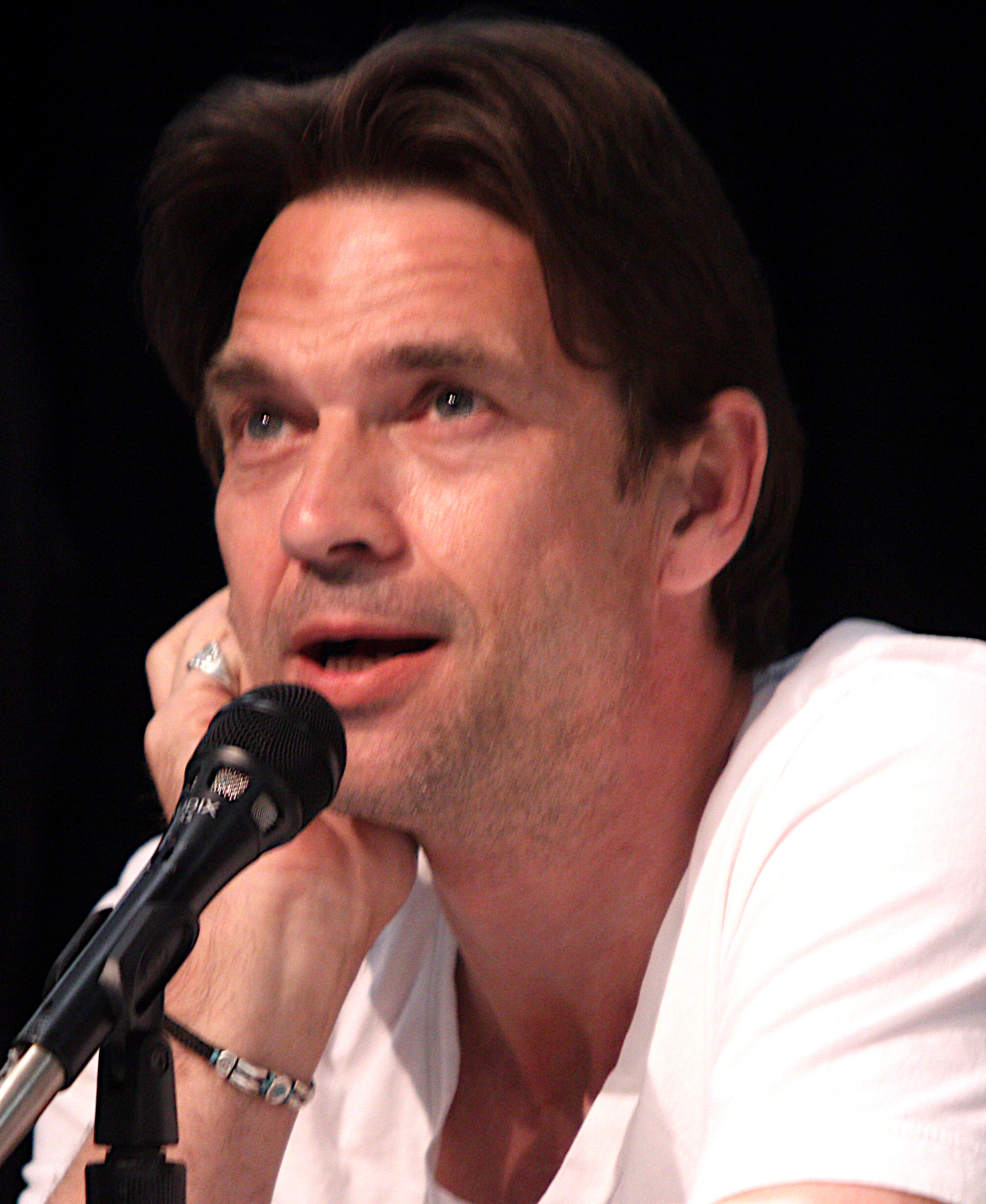
Scott at the 2013 WonderCon

=== Film ===
Year	Title	Role	Notes
1994	Princess Caraboo	Dragoon Captain	
1997	Twin Town	Terry Walsh	
1997	Love in Paris	Charlie	Direct-to-video
1997	Regeneration	Captain Robert Graves	
1998	Deep Impact	Eric Vennekor	
1998	Ever After	Prince Henry	
1999	This Year's Love	Cameron	
1999	Faeries	Faery Prince	Voice
1999	Gregory's Two Girls	Fraser Rowan	
1999	The Miracle Maker	John	Voice
2000	Mission: Impossible 2	Sean Ambrose	
2001	Enigma	Tom Jericho	
2002	Ripley's Game	Jonathan Trevanny	
2003	To Kill a King	Thomas Fairfax	
2003	The Poet	Andrei	
2004	One Last Chance	Frankie the Fence	
2005	Things to Do Before You're 30	Cass	
2005	The Truth About Love	Archie	
2005	Dark Water	Kyle Williams	
2006	Perfect Creature	Silus	
2007	Hitman	Mike Whittier	
2008	Dr. Jekyll & Mr. Hyde	Dr. Jekyll / Mr. Hyde	
2008	New Town Killers	Alistair	
2011	There Be Dragons	Robert	
2011	Love's Kitchen	Rob Haley	
2011	A Thousand Kisses Deep	Ludwig Giroux	
2011	My Week with Marilyn	Arthur Miller	
2013	Death Race 3: Inferno	Niles York / Frankenstein	Direct-to-video
2013	Last Passenger	Lewis Shaler	
2014	Taken 3	Stuart St. John	
2015	The Rezort	Archer	
2015	The Vatican Tapes	Roger Holmes	
2015	Tiger House	Shane	
2016	London Town	Nick Baker	
2019	Sea Fever	Gerard	
2020	Sulphur and White	Donald Tait	
2021	La Cha Cha	Roger Callaway	
2023	Irena's Vow	Eduard Rügemer	
2025	Exterritorial	Erik Kynch	
2025	My Oxford Year	William Davenport	
2026	Her Private Hell	Johnny Thunders	

=== Television ===
Year	Title	Role	Notes
1990	Zorro	Don Pedro DeSoto	Episode: "Child's Play"
1992	Taggart	Colin Murphy	3 episodes
1992	Lovejoy	Horse	2 episodes
1992	Tell Tale Hearts	David Sellors	Miniseries; 3 episodes
1993	Stay Lucky	Alex	4 episodes
1995	Kavanagh QC	Terry Fisher	Episode: "A Family Affair"
1995	Soldier Soldier	Major Rory Taylor	11 episodes
1995	Highlander: The Series	Warren Cochrane	Episode: "Through a Glass, Darkly"
1996	The Crow Road	Lewis McHoan	Miniseries; 4 episodes
1997	The Place of the Dead	Lance Corporal Richard Mayfield	Television film
2000	Arabian Nights	Sultan Shahryar / Amin	Miniseries; 2 episodes
2006	Heist	Mickey O'Neil	Main role
2006	The Ten Commandments	Moses	Miniseries; 2 episodes
2006–2007	Desperate Housewives	Ian Hainsworth	18 episodes
2009	False Witness	Ian Porter	Miniseries; 2 episodes
2009	Father & Son	Michael O'Connor	Miniseries; 4 episodes
2009	The Day of the Triffids	Bill Masen	Miniseries; 2 episodes
2011	United	Matt Busby	Television film
2012	Sinbad	Father La Stessa	Episode: "Fiend or Friend?"
2013–2014	Hemlock Grove	Norman Godfrey	Main role (seasons 1–2)
2013	Doctor Who	Alec Palmer	Episode: "Hide"
2013	Strike Back: Shadow Warfare	James Leatherby	2 episodes
2013	The Wrong Mans	Walker	2 episodes
2016	Fear the Walking Dead	Thomas Abigail	2 episodes
2016	Harley and the Davidsons	Randall James	Miniseries; episode: "Race to the Top"
2016	Full Circle	Senator David Faulkner	Main role (season 3)
2017	The Replacement	David Warnock	Miniseries; 3 episodes
2017–2018	Snatch	Vic Hill	Main role
2017	Jamie Johnson	Foxborough Scout	Episode: "End Game"
2018	Urban Myths	Arthur Miller	Episode: "Marilyn Monroe and Billy Wilder"
2018	The Woman in White	Sir Percival Glyde	Miniseries; 5 episodes
2019	Departure	Ethan Moreau	6 episodes
2019–2021	Batwoman	Jacob Kane	Main role (seasons 1–2); 35 episodes
2021–2022	Crime	Ray Lennox	Main role; also executive producer
2023	A Town Called Malice	Tony Lord	Main role
2023	Vigil	AVM Marcus Grainger	6 episodes
2025	The Crow Girl	Lou Stanley	Main role
2025	Sherlock & Daughter	Professor Moriarty	Main role
2025	The Hack	Gordon Brown	3 episodes
2025	Summerwater	David	Main role
2026	Crookhaven	Caspian Lockett	Main role
2026	The Chief	Himself	1 episode; cameo
2026	The Invisible	Quintus Wernich	Main role; upcoming series

== Awards and nominations ==
Year	Award	Category	Work	Result
1999	Teen Choice Awards	Film – Breakout Performance	Ever After	Nominated
2009	Australian Film Institute Television Awards	Best Lead Actor in a Television Drama	False Witness	Nominated
2010	Astra Awards	Most Outstanding Performance by an Actor – Male	False Witness	Nominated
2022	Bafta Scotland Awards	Best Actor in Television	Irvine Welsh’s Crime	Won
2022	International Emmy Awards	Best Performance by an Actor	Irvine Welsh’s Crime	Won

== See also ==
- List of International Emmy Award winners
