= Jack Dee =

English comedian and actor (born 1961)

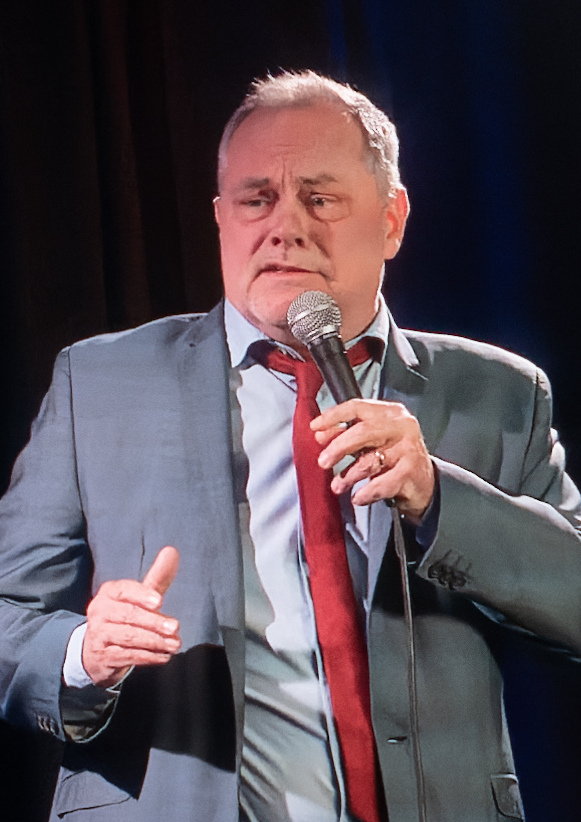
- Dee in 2023
- Born: James Andrew Innes Dee; 24 September 1961 (age 65); Bromley, Kent, England
- Notable work: The Jack Dee Show (1992–1994); Just for Laughs (1992) 'Art' (1998); Jack Dee: Live at the Apollo (2004–2006); Lead Balloon (2006–2011); Don't Sit in the Front Row (2012–2013); Josh (2014–2017); Bad Move (2017–2018)
- Spouse: Susan Jane Hetherington (m. 1989)
- Children: 4

Comedy career
- Years active: 1986–present
- Medium: Stand-up; television; radio
- Genres: Deadpan; observational comedy
- Subjects: Everyday life; family; marriage; human interaction; current events
- Jack Dee's voice from the BBC programme Loose Ends, 24 October 2009.
- Website: https://jackdeecomedy.com

James Andrew Innes, known professionally as Jack Dee, is an English stand-up comedian, actor, presenter, and writer known for his sarcasm, irony, and deadpan humour. He wrote and starred in the sitcom Lead Balloon and hosts the panel show I'm Sorry I Haven't a Clue.

His UK television appearances include being a team captain on Shooting Stars and hosting Jack Dee: Live at the Apollo, which was nominated for a BAFTA in 2006. He also presented The Jack Dee Show, Jack Dee's Saturday Night and Jack Dee's Happy Hour. He won Celebrity Big Brother 1 in 2001.

== Early life and education ==
Jack Dee was born 24 September 1961, is the youngest of three children born to Rosemary (née Stamper) and Geoffrey Dee, after Joanna Innes Dee and David Simon Innes Dee. He was born in the Municipal Borough of Bromley, Kent (now within the London Borough of Bromley) and grew up in Petts Wood, before moving with his family to Winchester when he was young. His father was a printer and his mother was the daughter of two repertory actors, Henry Lionel Pope Stamper (1906–1985) and Edna May Howard Innes (1904–1969).

Dee was educated at both private and state schools. His first school, The Pilgrims' School, a preparatory school in Winchester, was followed by the state Montgomery of Alamein School for his secondary education, and for a period he attended Frensham Heights School. He attended Peter Symonds' College, Winchester to obtain his A-level. Following this, he planned to attend drama college, but his plans were scuppered when his mother persuaded him to get a vocation; as such, he entered the catering industry and became a waiter.

In 2009, Dee received an honorary degree from the University of Winchester for recognition of his outstanding contribution to comedy, drama and the performing arts.

== Career ==
Dee's first public act was an open-mic gig in 1988 at The Comedy Store, which he went to one evening after work.

Since the 1990s, he has performed sell-out acts at many high-profile venues (including the London Palladium and the Hammersmith Apollo). After he won the British Comedy Award for Best Stage Newcomer in 1991, Dee was offered his own show; The Jack Dee Show first went out on Channel 4 in February 1992. His combination of stand-up routines on television continued with Jack Dee's Saturday Night on ITV, Jack Dee's Happy Hour in 1997 and later Jack Dee Live at the Apollo in 2004 on BBC One. Dee writes all his own material.

In 1996, he starred alongside Jeremy Hardy in Jack and Jeremy's Real Lives, a collection of mockumentaries similar to their previous collaboration, Jack and Jeremy's Police 4. Each episode focuses on the pair playing bizarre characters from a particular profession. Shot on film and featuring no laugh track, the show failed to catch on. Aside from his stand-up career, Dee has made appearances acting in television series. He played the part of Doug Digby in the Grimleys pilot (1997) before the role was recast for the series, and made guest appearances on such programmes as Silent Witness, Dalziel and Pascoe, and Jonathan Creek.

In 2001, he won Celebrity Big Brother, then linked to fundraising for Comic Relief. He has subsequently said that he dislikes the treatment of the housemates by the show and its producers, and has refused all permission for any of the clips to be shown again.

In 2004, he played the role of Steven Sharples MP, the self-styled 'Deputy Home Secretary', alongside Warren Clarke and Dervla Kirwan in The Deputy. Dee's performance was praised, though the film itself received a lukewarm response. Later that year he starred in another one-off drama, Tunnel of Love. He was the celebrity advocate in Britain's Best Sitcom for Fawlty Towers and presented an hour-long documentary about the series.

In 2005, he co-hosted Comic Aid, a one-off gathering of comedians that aimed to raise money for the Asian Tsunami Appeal. In May of the same year he appeared on the "Star in a Reasonably-Priced Car" segment of the BBC Two series Top Gear, achieving a lap time of 1:53.5 (52nd on the Suzuki Liana leader board). His series Lead Balloon, which he also co-wrote, began on BBC Four on 4 October 2006. Described as "Britain's answer to Curb Your Enthusiasm", Lead Balloon sees Dee play the semi-biographical role of Rick Spleen. A second series of eight episodes was commissioned and was broadcast on BBC Two in 2007, with a third series debuting on Thursday 13 November 2008. A fourth series finished on the BBC on 5 July 2011. He also starred as Harry in the 2005 film Short Order.

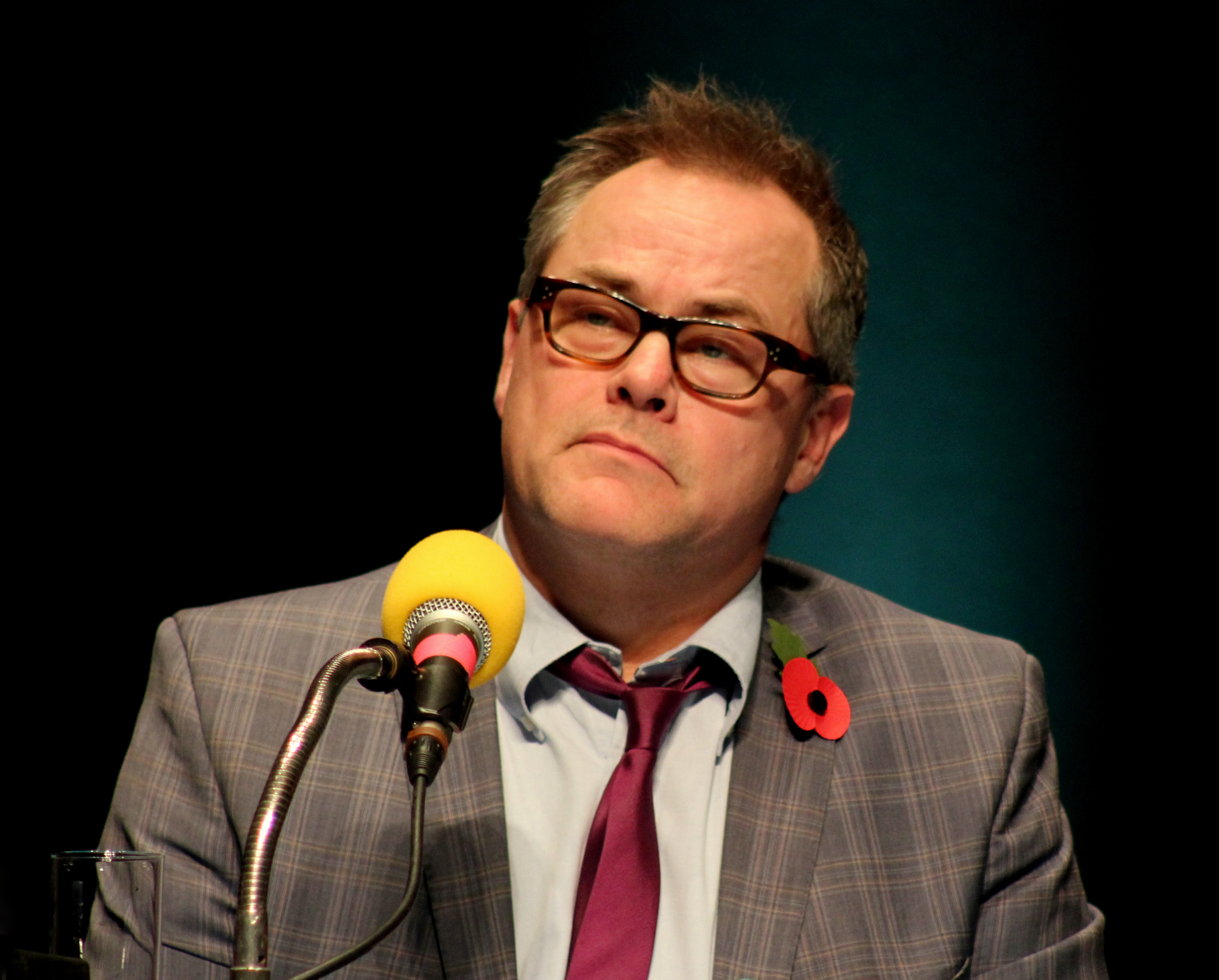
Dee chairing I'm Sorry I Haven't a Clue in 2014

In February 2009, it was announced that Dee would be one of a trio of hosts to replace the late Humphrey Lyttelton for the summer series of I'm Sorry I Haven't a Clue (the others being Stephen Fry and Rob Brydon). He subsequently became the permanent host from the 52nd series onwards. He is also a frequent guest on QI and Have I Got News for You, which he has guest-presented ten times; he also hosts segments of the BBC's biennial Comic Relief telethon. He starred in advertisements for John Smith's Bitter in the 1990s, becoming known as "the midget with the widget". He made his stage debut in 1998, playing Yvan in Yasmina Reza's Olivier award-winning 'Art'. He later returned as Serge for a 13-week run at the request of the director.

In 2008, Dee took part in the 15th anniversary special of Shooting Stars where he replaced Will Self as captain of Team A. The show aired on 30 December 2008 on BBC2. Dee returned as team captain in series 6 of Shooting Stars on 26 August 2009, and again for the 7th series. Over Christmas 2009, Dee played the role of John Tweedledum in The News at Bedtime.

In 2010, Dee took part in Channel 4's Comedy Gala, a benefit show held in aid of Great Ormond Street Children's Hospital, filmed live at the O2 Arena in London on 30 March. In 2013, Dee joined Dara Ó Briain, Chelsee Healey, Greg James, Melanie C and Philips Idowu in Through Hell and High Water, a Comic Relief challenge which involved celebrities canoeing the most difficult rapids of the Zambezi River. They raised more than £1 million for the charity.

In 2017, Dee co-wrote and starred in Bad Move, a sitcom about a middle-aged man and his wife (played by Kerry Godliman) who move from the city to a country cottage in search of the rural dream, which becomes more of a nightmare. A second series was broadcast in 2018.

In May 2024, Dee was announced as a contestant in the eighteenth series of Taskmaster, competing alongside Andy Zaltzman, Babatunde Aléshé, Emma Sidi, and Rosie Jones. He finished in second place to Zaltzman.

=== Other activities ===
In 2007, the Daily Express reported that Dee was in negotiations with publishers to release his autobiography. He signed with Doubleday in 2008 and the book, Thanks for Nothing: The Jack Dee Memoirs, was released in October 2009, along with an audiobook of the same title which he narrates. According to Dee, "it's really the story of how I got into comedy... It's kind of an autobiography but isn't, as it stops about 25 years ago. It goes right up to the first time I do stand up."

Dee is a director of Open Mike Productions, co-founded with Addison Cresswell, which produces shows for television and radio including Michael McIntyre's Comedy Roadshow and Alan Carr: Chatty Man.

== Personal life ==
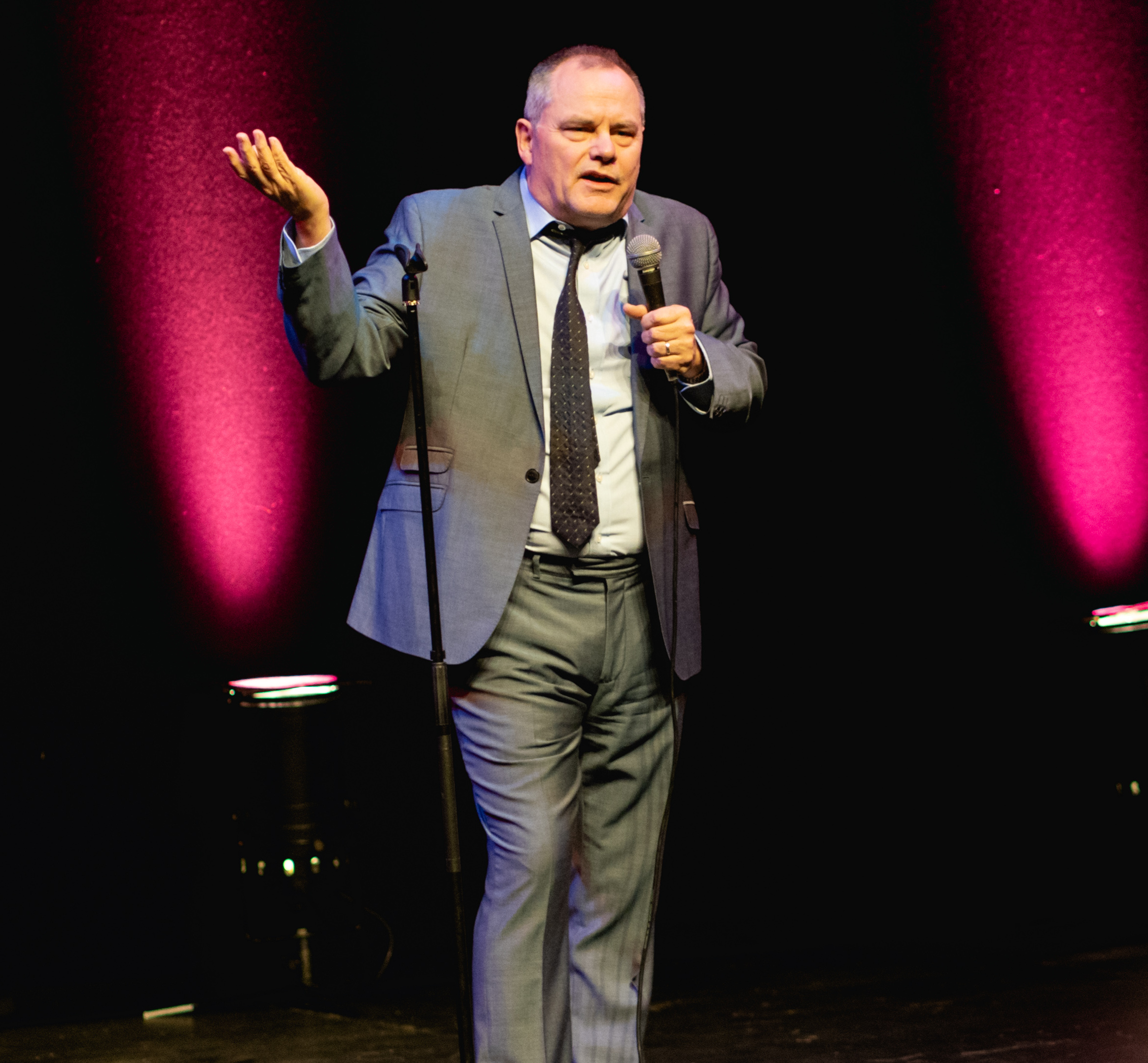
Dee performing in 2020

Dee met Susan Jane Hetherington in 1986, when he was working as a waiter in Fulham and she was a receptionist at a nearby hotel. They married in Winchester, Hampshire, in 1989. The couple divide their time between a family home in Wandsworth, London and a holiday house near Chichester, West Sussex. Together, they have four children.

Dee has depression. He has claimed that his work is the best therapy for his condition, saying "if you have the impulse to be creative, you ignore it at your peril".

In his twenties, Dee worked at the Ritz in Central London and started drinking heavily. He attended church and attempted to become a priest. After he realised that was not for him he gave it up, and quit drinking, although he would later describe his condition as "alcohol abuse" rather than alcoholism, which was the diagnosis at the time. Since the 1990s, he has advertised John Smith's Bitter, becoming known as "the midget with the widget". Following his appearance on Celebrity Big Brother, he had a relapse, though did not attend AA meetings because he did not want paparazzi photographing him leaving the meetings.

In February 2009, Dee and several other entertainers wrote an open letter to The Times supporting Baháʼí leaders, then on trial in Iran.

== Filmography ==
Year	Title	Role	Notes
1992–1994	The Jack Dee Show	Presenter	
1993	The South Bank Show	Himself	Guest
1994–1996	Top of the Pops	Guest Presenter	5 episodes
1995	The Steal	Wilmot's Servant	Guest role
1996	Jack & Jeremy's Real Lives	Various characters	
1997	Clive Anderson All Talk	Guest	
1997	The Grimleys	Doug Digby	Main cast
1998	The Ambassador	Cornelius	Guest role
1999	Comic Relief	Presenter	
1999	It's only TV, But I like It	Team captain	
1999	Silent Witness	Chris Caldwell	Guest role
1999	The Comedy Trail: A Shaggy Dog Story	Himself	TV special
2000	Don't Panic: The Dad's Army Story	Himself	Guest
2000–2001	Jack Dee's Happy Hour	Himself	Regular
2001	Celebrity Big Brother	Contestant	Winner
2001	Trust Me I'm a Celebrity	Presenter	
2002	Dalziel and Pascoe	Dick Dee	Guest role
2002	Jack Dee: Sent To Siberia	Himself	
2003	Comic Relief	Himself	
2003	Jonathan Creek	Dudley Houseman	Guest role
2004	Spivs	Nigel	
2004	Bob Monkhouse: A BAFTA Tribute	Himself	Guest
2004	Tunnel of Love	Roy	TV movie
2004–2005, 2007, 2013	Live at the Apollo	Presenter and Guest Presenter	
2005	Comic Aid	Presenter	One-off edition
2006	Mark Lawson Talks To...	Himself	Guest
2006	The Last Drop	Warren	
2006–2011	Lead Balloon	Rick Spleen	Main cast
2007	Dawn French's Boys Who Do Comedy	Regular	
2007	The Big Fat Anniversary Quiz	Contestant	
2007	Jack Dee Up Close	Presenter	
2008	Happy Birthday Brucie	Himself	Guest
2008	The Comedy Map of Britain	Himself	
2008–2011	Shooting Stars	Team captain	
2009	Kingdom	Judge Jeremey Harding	Guest role
2010	Let's Dance for Sport Relief	Guest judge	
2010	Channel 4's Comedy Gala	Performer	
2010	A Comedy Roast	Roaster	
2010	Fry & Laurie Reunited	Himself	Guest
2011	24 Hour Panel People	Himself	
2011	Wall of Fame	Team captain	
2011	My Favourite Joke	Himself	5 episodes
2014–2017	Josh	Geoff	Main cast
2015	Alternative Election Night	Himself	Panellist
2015	The Apprentice: You're Fired!	Presenter	Series 11
2015–2016	Jack Dee's Helpdesk	Presenter	
2016	Power Monkeys	Oliver	Main cast
2017–2018	Bad Move	Steve	Main cast, 13 episodes
2024	Have I Got News for You	Guest panellist	1 episode
2024	Taskmaster	Contestant	Series 18, 10 episodes
2026	Help Me Tiny Big Brain	Himself	Host
2026	LOL: Last One Laughing UK	Himself	4 episodes

== Awards and nominations ==
Year	Award	Category	Work	Result
1991	British Comedy Award	Best Stage Newcomer		Won
1991	Perrier Comedy Award			Nominated
1997	British Advertising Award		John Smith's Bitter Commercials	Won
1997	British Comedy Award	Best Stand-up Comedian		Won
2006	British Academy Television Award	Best Entertainment Performance	Jack Dee Live at the Apollo	Nominated

== Books ==
- Thanks for Nothing (Doubleday, 2009) ISBN 9780385615488
- What is Your Problem? (Quercus, 2021) ISBN 9781529413366

== Stand-up VHS & DVDs ==
- Live at the Duke of York's Theatre (1992)
- Live at the London Palladium (10 October 1994)
- Live in London (10 November 1997)
- Live and Uncut (13 December 1999) [extended version of Live in London]
- Live at the Apollo (18 November 2002)
- Live Again (14 November 2005)
- So What? Live (18 November 2013)

Preceded by None	Celebrity Big Brother UK winner Series 1 (2001)	Succeeded by Mark Owen
