= Mick Rossi =

American multi-instrumentalist and Philip Glass collaborator

- Born: December 9, 1956 (age 69); Trenton, New Jersey, US
- Occupations: Musician, conductor, composer
- Instruments: Piano, drums, oboe
- Labels: Orange Mountain; OmniTone; Knitting Factory; Cadence Jazz; ToneScience; Dreambox; Broken Land; Relaxation/Ellipsis; Secret; Robot Love
- Member of: Philip Glass Ensemble
- Website: mickrossi.com

Mick Rossi (born December 9, 1956) is an American pianist, drummer, percussionist, conductor and composer known for his diverse, progressive work in the New York Downtown scene. A longtime collaborator of Philip Glass and Paul Simon, Rossi's career has spanned many genres of contemporary American music.

== Biography ==
Rossi was born in Trenton, New Jersey. His father played the accordion. Rossi started on piano at the age of four, and three years later he started playing oboe and drums.

His teachers include Philadelphia guitarist Dennis Sandole.

Rossi earned his bachelor's degree in percussion from the College of New Jersey and pursued a master's degree in composition at New York University.

== Career ==
In 2001, Rossi joined the Philip Glass Ensemble as percussionist and keyboardist, playing on nine Glass recordings, including Music in Twelve Parts, Orion, and Leonard Cohen's Book of Longing. In 2012, he was assistant conductor for the production of "Einstein on the Beach". As a member of the ensemble, Rossi performed around the world at venues such as The Acropolis, Carnegie Hall, Hollywood Bowl and Lincoln Center. He toured with the Philip Glass Chamber Trio with Wendy Sutter and conducted Glass at the Sydney Opera House.

In 2010, Rossi began recording and touring with Paul Simon, which included the tour with Sting in 2014, Simon's 25th anniversary tour for the album Graceland, and his tour for the album So Beautiful or So What. Keyboard magazines said, "it was like nothing you've ever heard at a rock concert: Mick was improvising a cadenza that was an explosion of what sounded like Philip Glass meets Shostakovich...and it grooved."

Rossi was conductor and co-orchestrator for the albums My December (2007) by Kelly Clarkson and Dark Hope (2010) by Renée Fleming. He was music director for the MATA Festival in 2005 and for The Bacchae of Euripides in Shakespeare in the Park with JoAnne Akalaitis and Philip Glass. Broadway credits as pianist and conductor include Tommy, Jeckyll and Hyde, and The Full Monty.

Rossi's work has been presented at Merkin Hall, The Stone, Barbes, Routlette, Knitting Factory, MOMA, WNYC's New Sounds with John Schaefer, NPR's All Things Considered, WKCR's Musicians Show, and Tribecca New Music Festival.

Rossi has also worked with Alex Acuña, Steven Bernstein, Theo Bleckmann, Angela Bofill, Jimmy Cliff, Dave Douglas, Mark Dresser, Kermit Driscoll, Billy Drewes, Peter Erskine, Erik Friedlander, Vinny Golia, Eddie Gómez, Mark Graham, Hall & Oates, Gerry Hemingway, Russ Johnson, Carla Kihlstedt, Andy Laster, Mahavishnu Project, Wynton Marsalis, Pat Martino, Aaron Neville, Randy Newman, Jack QT, Michael Sarin, Carly Simon, Wadada Leo Smith, Andrew Sterman, Foday Suso, Steve Ulrich, Johnnie Valentino, and Cuong Vu.

== Film and television ==
Rossi's scores for film and television include Bored to Death (HBO), Delmar (Matt Dine), The Vagina Monologues (HBO), Standing in the Shadows of Motown (Artisan), and his scores for the award-winning independent films Born Again (Markie Hancock), The Other Side of the River, and Journey (both by Lin Chien Ping), and the prize-winning Zipper (Amy Nicholson).

== Recordings ==
- Songs from the Broken Land (Orange Mountain Music)
- One Block from Planet Earth (OmniTone)
- They Have a Word for Everything (Knitting Factory)
- Inside the Sphere (Cadence Jazz)
- New Math w/Russ Johnson (ToneScience)
- Nosferatu w/The Rowen University Percussion Ensemble and Dean Witten, Conductor (Dreambox Media)
- Micromusic w/John O'Gallagher (Broken Land Records)
- Asilo w/Johnnie Valentino (Broken Land Records)
- Music for Sound Healing w/Dr. Mitch Gaynor (Relaxation/Ellipsis Arts)
- Sapphire Skies w/Dr. Jeffrey Thompson (Relaxation/Ellipsis Arts)
- Dancing Clouds w/Dr. Jeffrey Thompson (Relaxation/Ellipsis Arts)
- Live in Tokyo w/L.A.M.F (Secret Records)
- Sessions with Mick w/Val Kilmer
