= Geoff Wraith =

English RL coach and former rugby league footballer (1946–2019)

Personal information
- Full name: Geoffrey Wraith
- Born: 1 October 1946; Leeds, England
- Died: 26 August 2019 (aged 72)

Playing information
- Position: Fullback, Centre
Club
Years	Team	Pld	T	G	FG	P
1963–74	Wakefield Trinity	226	46	15	0	168
1974–76	Norths Devils
1976–83	Castleford	216	42	0	0	126
1984	Wakefield Trinity	1
	Total	443	88	15	0	294
Representative
Years	Team	Pld	T	G	FG	P
1972–80	Yorkshire	7	0	0	0	0

Coaching information
Club
Years	Team	Gms	W	D	L	W%
1984	Wakefield Trinity	10

Geoffrey Wraith (1 October 1946 – 26 August 2019) was an English professional rugby league footballer who played in the 1960s, 1970s and 1980s, and coached in the 1980s. He played at representative level for Yorkshire, and at club level for Hunslet Juniors, Wakefield Trinity (two spells), Norths Devils and Castleford, as a left-footed toe-end style (rather than round the corner style) goal-kicking fullback or centre, and coached at club level for Castleford (assistant coach) and Wakefield Trinity.

== Background ==
Wraith was born in Leeds, West Riding of Yorkshire, England, on 1 October 1946. He was a pupil at Foxwood School, Seacroft, Leeds, he died aged 72, his funeral took place at Holy Trinity Church, Rothwell, West Yorkshire on 5 September 2019, followed by a reception at the Repton Room, Oulton Hall, Oulton, West Yorkshire.

== Playing career ==
=== County honours ===
Geoff Wraith won caps playing fullback for Yorkshire while at Wakefield Trinity, and while at Castleford in the 10-7 victory over Cumbria at Crown Flatt, Dewsbury on Wednesday 19 November 1975, the 16-16 draw with Other Nationalities at Odsal Stadium, Bradford on Saturday 6 December 1975, the 12-12 draw with Cumbria at Recreation Ground, Whitehaven on Tuesday 15 February 1977, and the 16-17 defeat by Cumbria at The Boulevard, Hull on Wednesday 17 September 1980.

=== County Cup Final appearances ===
Geoff Wraith played fullback (replaced by substitute Leslie Sheard) in Wakefield Trinity's 2-7 defeat by Leeds in the 1973 Yorkshire Cup Final during the 1973–74 season at Headingley, Leeds on Saturday 20 October 1973, and played fullback in Castleford's 17-7 victory over Featherstone Rovers in the 1977 Yorkshire Cup Final during the 1977–78 season at Headingley, Leeds on Saturday 15 October 1977.

=== BBC2 Floodlit Trophy Final appearances ===
Geoff Wraith played fullback in Castleford's 12-4 victory over Leigh in the 1976 BBC2 Floodlit Trophy Final during the 1976–77 season at Hilton Park, Leigh on Tuesday 14 December 1976.

=== Player's No.6 Trophy Final appearances ===
Geoff Wraith played fullback (replaced by substitute Bernard Ward) in Wakefield Trinity's 11-22 defeat by Halifax in the 1971–72 Player's No.6 Trophy Final during the 1971–72 season at Odsal Stadium, Bradford on Saturday 22 January 1972, and played fullback, and scored a try in Castleford's 25-15 victory over Blackpool Borough in the 1976–77 Player's No.6 Trophy Final during the 1976–77 season at The Willows, Salford on Saturday 22 January 1977.

=== Club career ===
Geoff Wraith made his début for Wakefield Trinity against Castleford at Belle Vue, Wakefield during May 1963, he played his last match for Wakefield Trinity (in his second spell) when came out of retirement to play 1-game during his period as coach of Wakefield Trinity, he transferred from Wakefield Trinity to Norths Devils, he transferred from Norths Devils to Castleford, he made his début for Castleford in the 10-25 defeat by Leeds in the 1975 BBC2 Floodlit Trophy preliminary round match during the 1975–76 season at Headingley, Leeds on Wednesday 24 September 1975, and he played his last match for Castleford during March 1983.

== Coaching career ==
=== Club career ===
Geoff Wraith was the coach of Wakefield Trinity from February 1984 to May 1984.

== Quote ==
"On Mondays which I set aside for developing skills and positional play, there were sometimes only four or five players turning up. From the others I'd get excuses like 'My wife was having a Tupperware party'." Geoff Wraith, on his resignation as coach of Wakefield Trinity.
