= Phil Johnson (rugby league) =

English rugby league player

Personal information
- Full name: Philip Johnson
- Born: 24 December 1963 (age 61); Yorkshire, England

Playing information
- Position: Fullback, Centre, Stand-off
Club
Years	Team	Pld	T	G	FG	P
1969–81	Castleford	288	86	0	0	258
1982–84	Featherstone Rovers	30+1	6	0	0	18
1984–89	Huddersfield
	Total	319	92	0	0	276
Representative
Years	Team	Pld	T	G	FG	P
1979	Yorkshire	1	0	0	0	0

Philip Johnson is a former professional rugby league footballer who played in the 1960s, 1970s, 1980s and 1990s. He played at representative level for Yorkshire, and at club level for Castleford, Featherstone Rovers and Huddersfield as a fullback, centre, or stand-off.

His brother Peter also played rugby league for Featherstone Rovers as prop.

== Playing career ==
=== Castleford ===
Philip Johnson played at centre in Castleford's 12–4 victory over Leigh in the 1976 BBC2 Floodlit Trophy Final during the 1976–77 season at Hilton Park, Leigh on Tuesday 14 December 1976.

Philip Johnson played at centre, and scored a try in Castleford's 25–15 victory over Blackpool Borough in the 1976–77 Player's No.6 Trophy Final during the 1976–77 season at The Willows, Salford on Saturday 22 January 1977.

Philip Johnson played at centre in Castleford's 17–7 victory over Featherstone Rovers in the 1977 Yorkshire Cup Final during the 1977–78 season at Headingley, Leeds on Saturday 15 October 1977.

Philip Johnson's Testimonial match at Castleford took place in 1980.

=== Featherstone Rovers ===
Philip Johnson made his début for Featherstone Rovers on Sunday 22 August 1982, through injury, he did not play in Featherstone Rovers' 14-12 victory over Hull F.C. in the 1983 Challenge Cup Final during the 1982–83 season at Wembley Stadium, London on Saturday 7 May 1983, and he played his last match for Featherstone Rovers during the 1983–84 season.

=== County honours ===
Philip Johnson won a cap playing as an interchange/substitute for Yorkshire while at Castleford in the 19-16 victory over Lancashire at Castleford's stadium on 12 September 1979.
