= Bob Spurr =

English rugby league footballer

Personal information
- Full name: Robert Spurr
- Born: 1949 (age 76–77) Pontefract, England

Playing information
- Position: Hooker
Club
| Years | Team | Pld | T | G | FG | P |
|---|---|---|---|---|---|---|
| 1968–83 | Castleford | 323 | 45 | 0 | 0 | 135 |
| 1983–87 | Featherstone Rovers | 108 | 14 | 0 | 0 | 56 |
| 1987 | Bradford Northern | 2 |
| | Total | 433 | 59 | 0 | 0 | 191 |
Representative
| Years | Team | Pld | T | G | FG | P |
| 1974 | Yorkshire | 2 |

Robert "Bob" Spurr (born 1949) is an English former professional rugby league footballer who played in the 1960s, 1970s and 1980s. He played at representative level for Yorkshire, and at club level for Castleford, Featherstone Rovers and Bradford Northern, as a hooker.

== Background ==
Spurr was born in the Pontefract district of Wakefield, West Riding of Yorkshire, England.

== Playing career ==
=== County honours ===
Spurr won caps playing hooker for Yorkshire while at Castleford in the 7–10 defeat by Cumberland at Workington Town's stadium on Wednesday 11 September 1974, and in the 16–17 defeat by Cumberland at Hull Kingston Rovers' stadium on Tuesday 17 September 1974.

=== County Cup Final appearances ===
Spurr played hooker in Castleford's 17–7 victory over Featherstone Rovers in the 1977 Yorkshire Cup Final during the 1977–78 season at Headingley, Leeds on Saturday 15 October 1977, and played hooker in the 10–5 victory over Bradford Northern in the 1981 Yorkshire Cup Final during the 1981–82 season at Headingley, Leeds on Saturday 3 October 1981.

=== BBC2 Floodlit Trophy Final appearances ===
Spurr played hooker in Castleford's 12–4 victory over Leigh in the 1976 BBC2 Floodlit Trophy Final during the 1976–77 season at Hilton Park, Leigh on Tuesday 14 December 1976.

=== Player's No.6 Trophy Final appearances ===
Spurr played hooker in Castleford's 25–15 victory over Blackpool Borough in the 1976–77 Player's No.6 Trophy Final during the 1976–77 season at The Willows, Salford on Saturday 22 January 1977.

=== Club career ===
Spurr made his début for Featherstone Rovers against Castleford on Sunday 21 August 1983, and he played his last match for Featherstone Rovers against Fulham at Craven Cottage in October 1987.

=== Testimonial match ===
Spurr's Testimonial match at Castleford took place in 1981.

== Family Life ==
Robert Spurr is the father of the rugby league footballers Chris Spurr and Mark Spurr (York City Knights).
