= Alf Weston =

English rugby league footballer

Playing information
- Position: Prop
Club
Years	Team	Pld	T	G	FG	P
1976–78	Castleford	19	3	0	0	9

Alf Weston is a former professional rugby league footballer who played in the 1970s. He played at club level for Castleford, as a prop.

== Playing career ==
=== County Cup Final appearances ===
Alf Weston played at prop in Castleford's 17-7 victory over Featherstone Rovers in the 1977 Yorkshire Cup Final during the 1977–78 season at Headingley, Leeds on Saturday 15 October 1977.
