= Bruce Burton =

English rugby league & union footballer

Personal information
- Born: 20 September 1952 (age 73) Wakefield district, England

Playing information

Rugby union
Club
Years	Team	Pld	T	G	FG	P
1969	Sandal RUFC

Rugby league
- Position: Stand-off
Club
Years	Team	Pld	T	G	FG	P
1969–76	Halifax	184	77	348	1	928
1976–80	Castleford	135	89	41	4	353
	Total	319	166	389	5	1281
Representative
Years	Team	Pld	T	G	FG	P
1974–78	Yorkshire	4	2	1	0	7
1976	Great Britain U24	2	0	0	0	0

Bruce Burton (born 20 September 1952) is an English former rugby union and professional rugby league footballer who played in the 1970s and 1980s. He played club level rugby union (RU) for Sandal RUFC, and representative level rugby league (RL) for Yorkshire, and at club level for Halifax, and Castleford, as a stand-off.

== Background ==
Bruce Burton's birth was registered in Wakefield district, West Riding of Yorkshire, England.

He was inducted into the Halifax Hall of Fame

== Playing career ==
=== County Cup Final appearances ===
Bruce Burton played stand-off, was man of the match winning the White Rose Trophy, and scored 2-tries and a drop goal in Castleford's 17-7 victory over Featherstone Rovers in the 1977 Yorkshire Cup Final during the 1977–78 season at Headingley, Leeds on Saturday 15 October 1977.

=== BBC2 Floodlit Trophy Final appearances ===
Bruce Burton played stand-off, and scored a try in Castleford's 12-4 victory over Leigh in the 1976 BBC2 Floodlit Trophy Final during the 1976–77 season at Hilton Park, Leigh on Tuesday 14 December 1976.

=== Player's No.6 Trophy Final appearances ===
Bruce Burton played stand-off, and scored 5-goals in Halifax's 22-11 victory over Wakefield Trinity in the 1971–72 Player's No.6 Trophy Final during the 1971–72 season at Odsal Stadium, Bradford on Saturday 22 January 1972, and played stand off, and scored a try in Castleford's 25-15 victory over Blackpool Borough in the 1976–77 Player's No.6 Trophy Final during the 1976–77 season at The Willows, Salford on Saturday 22 January 1977.

=== County honours ===
Bruce Burton played 3 times for Yorkshire whilst playing for Halifax and once whilst playing stand-off for Yorkshire while at Castleford scoring a try in the 19-16 victory over Lancashire at Castleford's stadium on 12 September 1978.
