= Sammy Lloyd =

GB international rugby league footballer

Personal information
- Full name: Geoffrey Lloyd
- Born: 11 September 1951 (age 74) Allerton Bywater, West Riding of Yorkshire, England

Playing information
- Position: Wing, Second-row, Loose forward
Club
Years	Team	Pld	T	G	FG	P
1969–78	Castleford	225	44	741	2	1616
1978–83	Hull FC	121	20	366	1	793
	Total	346	64	1107	3	2409
Representative
Years	Team	Pld	T	G	FG	P
1977–78	Yorkshire	3	0	7	0	14

Geoffrey "Sammy" Lloyd (born 11 September 1951) is an English former professional rugby league footballer who played as a second-row in the 1960s and 1970s.

He played at representative level for Great Britain (non-Test matches) and Yorkshire, and at club level for Castleford and Hull FC as a right-footed round the corner style (rather than toe-end style) goal-kicker.

== Background ==
Sammy Lloyd's birth was born in Allerton Bywater, West Riding of Yorkshire, England.

== Playing career ==
=== Castleford ===
Lloyd played second-row, and scored three goals in Castleford's 12–4 victory over Leigh in the 1976 BBC2 Floodlit Trophy Final during the 1976-77 season at Hilton Park, Leigh on Tuesday 14 December 1976.

Lloyd played at second-row, and scored five goals in Castleford's 25–15 victory over Blackpool Borough in the 1976–77 Player's No.6 Trophy Final during the 1976-77 season at The Willows, Salford on Saturday 22 January 1977.

Lloyd played loose forward, and scored 5-goals in Castleford's 17–7 victory over Featherstone Rovers in the 1977 Yorkshire Cup Final during the 1977–78 season at Headingley, Leeds on Saturday 15 October 1977.

=== Hull ===
In 1978, Lloyd was transferred from Castleford to Hull FC for a transfer-fee of £12,000 (based on increases in average earnings, this would be approximately £106,900 in 2014). In his first home game for the club, he converted 14 goals in a 61–10 victory over Oldham, equalling Jim Kennedy's club record for the most goals scored in a single match. The record was subsequently also equalled by Matt Crowther, who is coincidentally Lloyd's nephew.

Sammy Lloyd played second-row in Hull FC's 5–10 defeat by Hull Kingston Rovers in the 1980 Challenge Cup Final at Wembley Stadium on Saturday 3 May 1980, scoring only one of five kicks and being unable to convert a try by Tim Wilby, FC's only try of the match. Lloyd was visibly distressed following the final by his unusually poor kicking performance, stating in tears that he had let his family and FC's fans down and feeling he could not bear to return to Hull. However, Lloyd was greeted by a rapturous reception from fans upon FC's return to The Boulevard a day later, convincing him to stay on with the team.

Two years later, Lloyd returned to Wembley for the 1982 Challenge Cup Final on 1 May 1982 against Widnes and played second-row, scoring four goals but ultimately missing one match-winning goal, resulting in a 14–14 draw. He was replaced by Lee Crooks in the subsequent replay at Elland Road.

=== Representative honours ===
Sammy Lloyd won caps for Yorkshire while at Castleford, playing second-row in the 12–12 draw with Cumberland at Whitehaven's stadium on 15 February 1977, and was a substitute in the 18–15 victory over Lancashire at Castleford's stadium on 1 March 1977.

Sammy Lloyd was selected for Great Britain's 1977 Rugby League World Cup squad, he played in a pre-tournament warm-up match, and sustained a knee injury, against New Zealand Māori, at Huntly, New Zealand, consequently he played in none of the World Cup matches, although he did later play in two midweek tour matches against club/county/region/state teams in Townsville, North Queensland and Gosford, New South Wales.
