= Dean Hanson =

Australian rugby league footballer

Personal information
- Full name: Dean Hanson
- Born: 4 January 1964 (age 62) Wakefield, West Yorkshire, England

Playing information
- Position: Lock, Second-row
Club
Years	Team	Pld	T	G	FG	P
1987	Halifax	16	2	0	0	8
1987–91	Illawarra Steelers	61	4	0	0	16
	Total	77	6	0	0	24
- Source: As of 2 February 2023

Dean Hanson is an English former professional rugby league footballer who played in the 1980s and 1990s. He played for Illawarra in the NSWRL competition and for Halifax in England.

== Background ==
Hanson's uncle, Gary Stephens, is a former rugby league player who won the 1976 NSWRL premiership with Manly. His cousin, Gareth Stephens, is also a former player of the rugby league.

== Playing career ==
Hanson started his career in England with Halifax during the 1987 season. He then moved to Australia and signed with Illawarra, where he played 61 games over the next five years. Hanson's time at Illawarra was not particularly successful, with the club finishing last in 1989 and failing to make the finals in all the other seasons he played there.
