= Joseph Rowntree Theatre =

Theatre in York, England

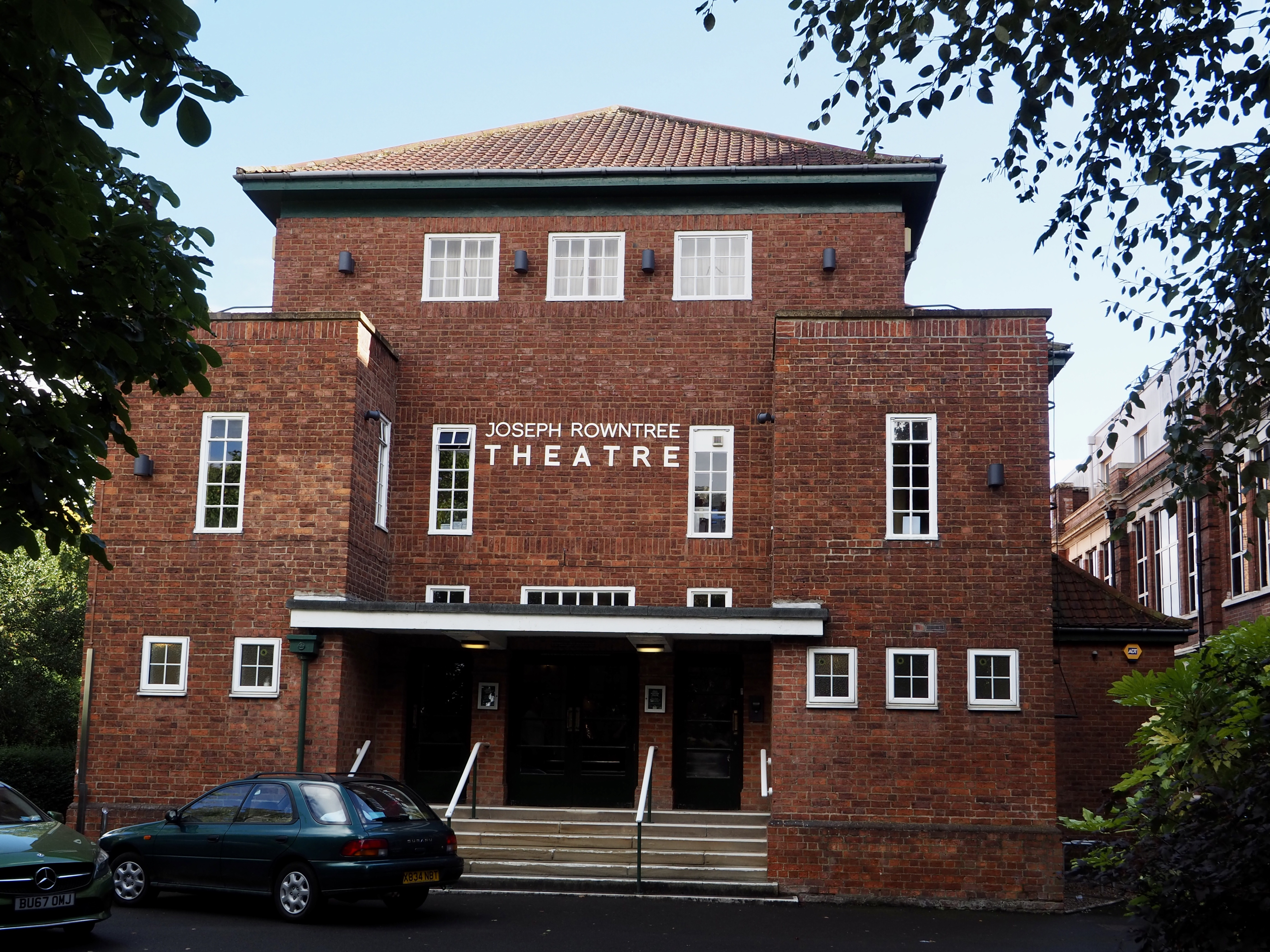
- The theatre in 2021

- Location within North Yorkshire

General information
- Architectural style: Art Deco
- Location: Haxby Road, York, North Yorkshire, England
- Coordinates: 53°58′29″N 1°04′33″W
- Named for: Joseph Rowntree
- Year built: 1935
- Renovated: 2014 (roof replaced)
- Client: Rowntree's

Design and construction
- Architects: Barry Parker and Raymond Unwin

Website
- josephrowntreetheatre.co.uk

Listed Building – Grade II
- Official name: Joseph Rowntree Theatre
- Designated: 29 May 2003
- Reference no.: 1096161

The Joseph Rowntree Theatre is a historic theatre on Haxby Road in the north of York, a city in North Yorkshire, England.

The theatre was commissioned by the Rowntree's chocolate company, as a facility for its workers, alongside a library, swimming pool and bowling green. It was designed by Barry Parker and Raymond Unwin in the Art Deco style, and was completed in 1935. It was named the "Joseph Rowntree Hall" in memory of Joseph Rowntree, former co-owner of the company, and originally operated as both a theatre and a lecture hall. At the time, it was connected to the factory's canteen, and workers could watch films during their lunch breaks. Rowntree's was bought by Nestle in 1988, which in 2012 sold the theatre to York St John University. It continued to be operated by the Joseph Rowntree Village Trust, and was later purchased by the trust. In 2014, the roof was replaced, and a new bar installed. At the time, the theatre was run by around 150 volunteers. In 2017, the in-house Joseph Rowntree Theatre Company was established. The building has been Grade II listed since 2003.

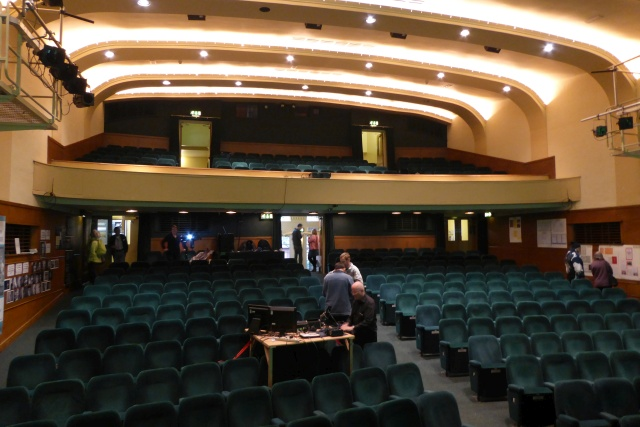
The auditorium

The theatre is constructed of brown brick, and has concrete dressings and a pantile roof. The building is mostly three storeys, and the recessed main entrance to the west consists of triple doors with a wooden canopy above. There are wings either side, with brick parapets. Each side has five buttresses, and the ground floor projects slightly. At the rear, the flytower rises to four storeys and has plain buttresses and a flat roof. Inside, the foyer has its original flooring, with a staircase to the left and box office to the right. The auditorium has raked stalls and a narrow gallery with a curved front. There is a proscenium arch to the stage, with an orchestra pit in front. Original features include wooden panelling, seating, and the stage machinery.
