= 1976–77 Player's No.6 Trophy =

- Structure: National knockout championship
- Teams: 32
- Winners: Castleford
- Runners-up: Blackpool Borough

The 1976–77 Player's No.6 Trophy was a British rugby league knockout tournament. It was the sixth season that the competition was staged, which was once again known as the Player's No.6 Trophy because of its sponsorship.

Castleford won the final, beating Second Division side Blackpool Borough by the score of 25–15. The match was played at The Willows, Salford. The attendance was 4,512 and receipts were £2,919.

== Background ==
This season saw no changes in the entrants, no new members and no withdrawals, the number remaining at thirty-two. For the second season there were no drawn matches in the competition.

== Competition and results ==
=== Round 1 - First Round ===
Involved 16 matches and 32 Clubs

Game No	Fixture Date	Home team	Score	Away team	Venue	Att	Rec	Notes	Ref
1	Sat 23 Oct 1976	Hull F.C.	18-5	Warrington	Boulevard				
2	Sat 23 Oct 1976	Leeds	34-10	Rochdale Hornets	Headingley				
3	Sun 24 Oct 1976	Blackpool Borough	16-15	Barrow	Borough Park				
4	Sun 24 Oct 1976	Bradford Northern	23-18	Huddersfield	Odsal				
5	Sun 24 Oct 1976	Bramley	33-5	Dewsbury	McLaren Field				
6	Sun 24 Oct 1976	Featherstone Rovers	43-13	Whitehaven	Post Office Road				
7	Sun 24 Oct 1976	Ovenden	4-24	Halifax	Thrum Hall	3680		1, 2	
8	Sun 24 Oct 1976	Hull Kingston Rovers	7-12	St. Helens	Craven Park (1)	5984			
9	Sun 24 Oct 1976	Huyton	6-8	York	Alt Park, Huyton				
10	Sun 24 Oct 1976	Leigh	29-7	Swinton	Hilton Park				
11	Sun 24 Oct 1976	New Hunslet	10-24	Castleford	Elland Road Greyhound Stadium				
12	Sun 24 Oct 1976	Oldham	17-9	Batley	Watersheddings				
13	Sun 24 Oct 1976	Ace Caravans	15-39	Salford	The Willows	3037		3, 4, 5	
14	Sun 24 Oct 1976	Wakefield Trinity	8-10	Widnes	Belle Vue				
15	Sun 24 Oct 1976	Wigan	33-0	Keighley	Central Park				
16	Sun 24 Oct 1976	Workington Town	45-15	Doncaster	Derwent Park				

=== Round 2 - Second Round ===
Involved 8 matches and 16 Clubs

Game No	Fixture Date	Home team	Score	Away team	Venue	Att	Rec	Notes	Ref
1	Sat 6 Nov 1976	Leeds	18-17	Salford	Headingley				
2	Sat 6 Nov 1976	St. Helens	18-22	Castleford	Knowsley Road	2691			
3	Sun 7 Nov 1976	Blackpool Borough	7-3	Halifax	Borough Park				
4	Sun 7 Nov 1976	Hull F.C.	19-5	Bradford Northern	Boulevard				
5	Sun 7 Nov 1976	Oldham	13-28	Leigh	Watersheddings			6	
6	Sun 7 Nov 1976	Widnes	10-0	Featherstone Rovers	Naughton Park				
7	Sun 7 Nov 1976	Workington Town	17-13	Bramley	Derwent Park				
8	Sun 7 Nov 1976	York	8-7	Wigan	Clarence Street	6503		7	

=== Round 3 -Quarter Finals ===
Involved 4 matches with 8 clubs

Game No	Fixture Date	Home team	Score	Away team	Venue	Att	Rec	Notes	Ref
1	Sat 20 Dec 1976	Leeds	14-20	Castleford	Headingley				
2	Sun 21 Dec 1976	Leigh	17-12	Hull F.C.	Hilton Park				
3	Sun 21 Dec 1976	Widnes	13-10	York	Naughton Park				
4	Sun 21 Dec 1976	Workington Town	5-11	Blackpool Borough	Derwent Park				

=== Round 4 – Semi-Finals ===
Involved 2 matches and 4 Clubs

Game No	Fixture Date	Home team	Score	Away team	Venue	Att	Rec	Notes	Ref
1	Sat 27 Dec 1976	Castleford	15-10	Widnes	Wheldon Road			8	
2	Sat 11 Dec 1976	Blackpool Borough	15-5	Leigh	Borough Park			8	

=== Final ===
22 January 1977

Castleford	25 – 15	Blackpool Borough
Tries: Burton, Johnson, Joyner, Stephens, Wraith; Goals: Lloyd (5)		Tries: Machen, Allen, Egan; Goals: Egan (3)

The Willows, Salford
Attendance: 4,512
Referee: Mick Naughton (Widnes)
Player of the Match: Gary Stephens
and Howard Allen (awarded jointly)

==== Teams and scorers ====
Castleford	No.	Blackpool Borough
	teams	
Geoffrey Wraith	1	Doug Reynolds
Steve Fenton	2	Doug Robinson
John Joyner	3	John Heritage
Philip Johnson	4	Paul Machen
Trevor Briggs	5	Phil Pitman
Bruce Burton	6	Ged Marsh
Gary Stephens	7	Jackie Newall
Paul Kahn	8	Jimmy Hamilton
Robert Spurr	9	Howard Allen
Alan Dickinson	10	Joe Egan
Mal Reilly	11	Paul Gamble
Geoffrey "Sammy" Lloyd	12	Ken Groves
Steve 'Knocker' Norton	13	Malcolm Pattinson
? Not used	14	Cliff Lamb (for Phil Pitman)
? Not used	15	Phil Hurst (for Ken Groves)
	Coach	Jim Crellin

=== Prize money ===
As part of the sponsorship deal and funds, the prize money awarded to the competing teams for this season was as follows:

Finish Position	Cash prize	No. receiving prize	Total cash
Winner	£6,000	1	£6,000
Runner-up	£3,000	1	£3,000
Semi-finalist	£1,500	2	£3,000
Loser in Rd 3	£700	4	£2,800
Loser in Rd 2	£550	8	£4,400
Loser in Rd 1	£400	16	£6,400
Grand Total			£25,600

=== The road to success ===
This tree excludes any preliminary round fixtures

First round
Leeds	34
Rochdale Hornets	10
Ace Caravans	15
Salford	39
Hull Kingston Rovers	7
St. Helens	12
New Hunslet	10
Castleford	24
Wakefield Trinity	8
Widnes	10
Featherstone Rovers	43
Whitehaven	13
Huyton	6
York	8
Wigan	33
Keighley	0
Workington Town	45
Doncaster	15
Bramley	22
Dewsbury	5
Blackpool Borough	16
Barrow	15
Ovenden	4
Halifax	24
Oldham	17
Batley	9
Leigh	29
Swinton	7
Hull F.C.	18
Warrington	5
Bradford Northern	23
Huddersfield	18

Second round
Leeds	18
Salford	17
St. Helens	18
Castleford	22
Widnes	10
Featherstone Rovers	0
York	8
Wigan	7
Workington Town	17
Bramley	13
Blackpool Borough	7
Halifax	3
Oldham	13
Leigh	28
Hull F.C.	19
Bradford Northern	5

Third round
Leeds	14
Castleford	20
Widnes	13
York	10
Workington Town	5
Blackpool Borough	11
Leigh	17
Hull F.C.	12

Semifinals
Castleford	15
Widnes	10
Blackpool Borough	15
Leigh	5

Final
Castleford	25
Blackpool Borough	15

== Notes ==
1 * Ovenden are a Junior (amateur) club from Halifax
2 * Ovenden were drawn at home but chose to give away home advantage
3 * Ace Caravans were a Junior (amateur) club from Hull
4 * Ace Caravans were drawn at home but chose to give away home advantage
5 * The Rothmans Yearbooks 1990-91 and 1991-92 gave the attendance as 3,037 but The News of the World/Empire News annual 1977–78 gave it as 3,680
6 * The News of the World/Empire News annual 1977–78 gives the score as 13-25 but other sources including RUGBYLEAGUEprojects, Wigan official archives give the score as 13-28
7 * Wigan's centre (No. 4) Bill Francis & York's second-row (No. 11) Gary Hetherington were both sent off for fighting in the 78th Minute
8 * Wigan official website states incorrectly that the match date was Saturday 27 November
9 * The Willows was the home ground of Salford with a final capacity of 11,363 which included 2,500 seats. The record attendance was 26,470 on the 13 February 1937 in the Challenge Cup first round match vs Warr

== See also ==
- 1976–77 Northern Rugby Football League season
- 1976 Lancashire Cup
- 1976 Yorkshire Cup
- Player's No.6 Trophy
- Rugby league county cups
