= Red and White Army =

Red and White Army is a term applied to sports teams that play in the colours red and white and is also ascribed to their respective supporters.

Teams that are known as the Red and White Army include:

In Football

- Arsenal F.C.
- Olympiacos F.C. Piraeus
- AZ Alkmaar
- Charlton Athletic F.C.
- Club african
- Derry City F.C.
- Hapoel Tel Aviv F.C.
- Hemel Hempstead Town F.C.
- Leigh RMI F.C.
- Middlesbrough F.C.
- Red Star Belgrade
- Rotherham United F.C.
- Southampton F.C.
- Sunderland A.F.C.
- Swindon Town F.C.
- Stevenage F.C.
- Independiente Santa Fe

In Australian rules football

- Sydney Swans
- Wydad AC
