= Derek Woodall =

English rugby league footballer

Playing information
- Position: Prop
Club
Years	Team	Pld	T	G	FG	P
1971–80	Castleford	56	0	0	0	0

Derek Woodall is a former professional rugby league footballer who played in the 1970s and 1980s. He played at club level for Castleford.

== Background ==
Derek Woodall was a pupil at Airedale Junior School.

== Playing career ==
=== County Cup Final appearances ===
Derek Woodall appeared as a substitute (replacing prop Tony Fisher) in Castleford's 17-7 victory over Featherstone Rovers in the 1977 Yorkshire Cup Final during the 1977–78 season at Headingley, Leeds on Saturday 15 October 1977.
