= Steve Fenton (rugby league) =

England international rugby league footballer

Personal information
- Full name: Stephen Fenton
- Born: unknown Castleford, England

Playing information
- Position: Wing
Club
Years	Team	Pld	T	G	FG	P
1974–87	Castleford	252	89	0	0	278
Representative
Years	Team	Pld	T	G	FG	P
1977–81	Great Britain U-24	6	3	0	0	9
1979–81	Yorkshire	5	0	0	0	0
1981	England	2	0	0	0	0

Stephen Fenton (birth unknown), also known by the nickname of "Fizzer", is an English former professional rugby league footballer who played in the 1970s and 1980s. He played at representative level for England, and at club level for Castleford, as a wing.

== Playing career ==
=== Club career ===
Fenton played right wing in Castleford's 12–4 victory over Leigh in the 1976 BBC2 Floodlit Trophy Final during the 1976–77 season at Hilton Park, Leigh on Tuesday 14 December 1976.

Fenton played right wing in Castleford's 25–15 victory over Blackpool Borough in the 1976–77 Player's No.6 Trophy Final during the 1976–77 season at The Willows, Salford on Saturday 22 January 1977.

Fenton played left wing in Castleford's 17–7 victory over Featherstone Rovers in the 1977 Yorkshire Cup Final during the 1977–78 season at Headingley, Leeds on Saturday 15 October 1977, played right-centre in the 10-5 victory over Bradford Northern in the 1981 Yorkshire Cup Final during the 1981–82 season at Headingley, Leeds on Saturday 3 October 1981, and played right wing in the 2–13 defeat by Hull F.C. in the 1983 Yorkshire Cup Final during the 1983–84 season at Elland Road, Leeds on Saturday 15 October 1983.

Castleford's most tries scored in a match record is 5-tries, and is jointly held by; Derek Foster against Hunslet on 10 November 1972, John Joyner against Millom on 16 September 1973, Stephen Fenton against Dewsbury on 27 January 1978, Ian French against Hunslet on 9 February 1986, and St. John Ellis against Whitehaven on 10 December 1989.

=== International honours ===
Steve Fenton won caps for England while at Castleford in 1981 against France, and Wales.
