= 1977–78 Yorkshire Cup =

- Structure: Regional knockout championship
- Teams: 16
- Winners: Castleford
- Runners-up: Featherstone Rovers

The 1977–78 Yorkshire Cup was the seventieth occasion on which the Yorkshire Cup competition had been held. This year, for the first time for eighteen years (and the last time in the history of the Yorkshire Cup), a new name appeared on the trophy, with Castleford winning it by beating Featherstone Rovers in the final by the score of 17–7. The match was played at Headingley, Leeds, now in West Yorkshire. The attendance was 6,318 and receipts were £4,528. It as also Featherstone Rovers's second consecutive Yorkshire Cup final appearances, both of which resulted in a defeat.

== Background ==
This season there were no junior/amateur clubs taking part, no new entrants and no "leavers" and so the total of entries remained the same at sixteen. This in turn resulted in no byes in the first round.

== Competition and results ==
=== Round 1 ===
Involved 8 matches (with no byes) and 16 clubs

Game No	Fixture date	Home team	Score	Away team	Venue	Att	Rec	Notes	Ref
1	Sat 20 Aug 1977	Batley	6–33	Leeds	Mount Pleasant				
2	Sat 20 Aug 1977	Bradford Northern	9–20	Featherstone Rovers	Odsal				
3	Sun 21 Aug 1977	Dewsbury	5–12	Castleford	Crown Flatt				
4	Sun 21 Aug 1977	Huddersfield	17–20	York	Fartown				
5	Sun 21 Aug 1977	Hull F.C.	33–19	Bramley	Boulevard				
6	Sun 21 Aug 1977	Keighley	16–0	Halifax	Lawkholme Lane				
7	Sun 21 Aug 1977	New Hunslet	14–8	Hull Kingston Rovers	Elland Road Greyhound Stadium				
8	Sun 21 Aug 1977	Wakefield Trinity	23–10	Doncaster	Belle Vue				

=== Round 2 - Quarter-finals ===
Involved 4 matches and 8 clubs

Game No	Fixture date	Home team	Score	Away team	Venue	Att	Rec	Notes	Ref
1	Sat 27 Aug 1977	Leeds	18–18	Hull F.C.	Headingley				
2	Sun 28 Aug 1977	Castleford	23–17	York	Wheldon Road				
3	Sun 28 Aug 1977	Keighley	17–8	New Hunslet	Lawkholme Lane				
4	Sun 28 Aug 1977	Wakefield Trinity	2–12	Featherstone Rovers	Belle Vue				

=== Round 2 - replays ===
Involved 1 match and 2 clubs

Game No	Fixture date	Home team	Score	Away team	Venue	Att	Rec	Notes	Ref
r	Wed 31 Aug 1977	Hull F.C.	19–11	Leeds	Boulevard				

=== Round 3 – Semi-finals ===
Involved 2 matches and 4 clubs

Game No	Fixture date	Home team	Score	Away team	Venue	Att	Rec	Notes	Ref
1	Tue 13 Sep 1977	Hull F.C.	5–19	Featherstone Rovers	Boulevard				
2	Fri 17 Sep 1977	Keighley	4–14	Castleford	Lawkholme Lane				

=== Final ===
Game No	Fixture date	Home team	Score	Away team	Venue	Att	Rec	Notes	Ref
	Saturday 15 October 1977	Castleford	17–7	Featherstone Rovers	Headingley	6,318	£4,528	(Note: Headingley, Leeds, is the home ground of Leeds RLFC with a capacity of 21,000. The record attendance was 40,175 for a league match between Leeds and Bradford Northern on 21 May 1947.)	

==== Teams and scorers ====
Castleford	№	Featherstone Rovers
	teams	
Geoff Wraith	1	John Marsden
Terrence "Terry" Richardson	2	Steve Evans
John Joyner	3	John Gilbert
Philip Johnson	4	Steve Quinn
Steve Fenton	5	Ken Kellett
Bruce Burton	6	John Newlove
Clive Pickerill	7	Peter Butler
Tony Fisher	8	Jeff Townend
Robert Spurr	9	John "Keith" Bridges
Alf Weston	10	Vince Farrar (Captain)
James Huddlestone	11	Michael "Mick" Gibbins
Mal Reilly (Captain)	12	Richard 'Charlie' Stone
Geoffrey "Sammy" Lloyd	13	Keith Bell
Gary Stephens (for Clive Pickerill)	14	Neil Tuffs (for Steve Quinn)
Derek Woodall (for Tony Fisher)	15	Peter Smith (for Richard Stone)
Malcolm "Mal" Reilly	Coach	Keith Cotton
17	score	7
4	HT	2
	Scorers	
	Tries	
Bruce Burton (2)	T	Peter Smith (1)
	Goals	
Geoffrey "Sammy" Lloyd (5)	G	Steve Quinn (1)
	G	Townsend (1)
	Drop Goals	
Bruce Burton (1)	DG	
Referee		Michael "Mick" J. Naughton (Widnes)
White Rose Trophy for Man of the match		Bruce Burton - Castleford - stand-off
sponsored by		
Competition Sponsor		Esso

Scoring - Try = three points - Goal = two points - Drop goal = one point

=== The road to success ===
First round
Keighley	16
Halifax	0
New Hunslet	14
Hull Kingston Rovers	8
Dewsbury	5
Castleford	12
Huddersfield	17
York	20
Batley	6
Leeds	33
Hull F.C.	33
Bramley	19
Wakefield Trinity	23
Doncaster	10
Bradford Northern	9
Featherstone Rovers	20

Second round
Keighley	17
New Hunslet	8
Castleford	23
York	17
Leeds	18 (11)
Hull F.C.	18 (19)
Wakefield Trinity	2
Featherstone Rovers	12

Semi-finals
Keighley	4
Castleford	14
Hull F.C.	5
Featherstone Rovers	19

Final
Castleford	17
Featherstone Rovers	7

== See also ==
- 1977–78 Northern Rugby Football League season
- Rugby league county cups
