= Jamie Walsh (rugby league) =

English rugby league footballer

Playing information
- Position: Wing
Club
Years	Team	Pld	T	G	FG	P
1974–79	Castleford	63	16	1	0	50
1979	Hull Kingston Rovers	26	3	0	0	9
	Total	89	19	1	0	59

Jamie Walsh is a former professional rugby league footballer who played in the 1970s. He played at club level for Castleford, as a wing, .

== Playing career ==
=== BBC2 Floodlit Trophy Final appearances ===
Jamie Walsh played on the wing, and scored a try in Castleford's 12–4 victory over Leigh in the 1976 BBC2 Floodlit Trophy Final during the 1976–77 season at Hilton Park, Leigh on Tuesday 14 December 1976.
