= Paul Kahn =

Paul Kahn may refer to:

- Paul Kahn (rugby league), rugby league footballer who played in the 1970s
- Paul W. Kahn (born 1952), professor of law at Yale Law School
