= Gary Stephens =

English rugby league footballer and coach (born 1952)

Personal information
- Born: 23 August 1952 (age 73) Castleford, England

Playing information
- Position: Scrum-half
Club
Years	Team	Pld	T	G	FG	P
1969–80	Castleford	315	109	0	0	327
1976–77	Manly-Warringah	30	2	0	0	6
1980–84	Wigan	93	15	0	2	50
1983	→ Warrington (loan)	7	1	0	0	3
1984	Leigh	16	2	0	0	8
1985–87	Halifax	82	17	0	9	77
1988	Leeds	1	0	0	0	0
1988–89	Ryedale-York	15	2	0	1	9
	Total	559	148	0	12	480
Representative
Years	Team	Pld	T	G	FG	P
1975–79	Yorkshire	5	1	0	0	3
1979	England	1	0	0	0	0
1979	Great Britain	5	1	0	0	3

Coaching information
Club
Years	Team	Gms	W	D	L	W%
1988–91	Ryedale-York
- Relatives: Gareth Stephens (son)

Gary Stephens (born 23 August 1952) is an English former professional rugby league footballer who played in the 1960s, 1970s and 1980s as a scrum-half, and coached in the 1980s and 1990s.

He played at representative level for Great Britain, England and Yorkshire, and at club level for Castleford, Manly-Warringah Sea Eagles, Wigan, Warrington, Leigh, Halifax and York. and coached at club level for Ryedale-York.

== Playing career ==
=== Castleford ===
Stephens played scrum-half in the 7–11 defeat by Hull Kingston Rovers in the 1971–72 Yorkshire Cup Final during the 1971–72 season at Belle Vue, Wakefield on Saturday 21 August 1971, and was a substitute (replacing Scrum-half Clive Pickerill) in the 17–7 victory over Featherstone Rovers in the 1977–78 Yorkshire Cup Final during the 1977–78 season at Headingley, Leeds on Saturday 15 October 1977.

Stephens played scrum-half in Castleford's 12–4 victory over Leigh in the 1976 BBC2 Floodlit Trophy Final during the 1976–77 season at Hilton Park, Leigh on Tuesday 14 December 1976.

Stephens played scrum-half, was man of the match (jointly with Blackpool Borough's Howard Allen) and scored a try in Castleford's 25–15 victory over Blackpool Borough in the 1976–77 Player's No.6 Trophy Final during the 1976–77 season at The Willows, Salford on Saturday 22 January 1977.

Gary Stephens' Testimonial match at Castleford took place in 1980.

=== Manly-Warringah ===
In 1976 Gary Stephens and Manly-Warringah team mates Phil Lowe and Steve Norton became the third Englishmen to have played in a NSWRFL Grand Final-winning team following Dick Huddart (St. George in 1966), Dave Bolton (Balmain in 1969), and Mal Reilly (Manly in 1972 and 1973).

=== Wigan ===
Stephens was signed by Wigan for a fee of £35,000, and made his debut in November 1980 against Fulham.

=== Halifax ===
Stephens played scrum-half in Halifax's 19–18 victory over St. Helens in the 1986-87 Challenge Cup Final during the 1986–87 season at Wembley Stadium, London on Saturday 2 May 1987.

=== Representative honours ===
Stephens won a cap for England while at Castleford in 1979 against Wales, and won caps for Great Britain while at Castleford in 1979 against Australia (3 matches), and New Zealand (2 matches).

Stephens won caps for Yorkshire while at Castleford playing Scrum-half in the 17–7 victory over Lancashire at Wigan's stadium on 20 December 1975, the 12–12 draw with Cumberland at Whitehaven's stadium on 15 February 1977, scoring 1-try in the 18–15 victory over Lancashire at Castleford's stadium on 1 March 1977, the 7–23 defeat by Lancashire at Widnes' stadium on 27 September 1978, and the 16–19 defeat by Lancashire at Castleford's stadium on 12 September 1979.
