= James Huddlestone =

English rugby league footballer

Playing information
- Position: Second-row
Club
Years	Team	Pld	T	G	FG	P
1972–80	Castleford	63	6	0	0	18

James Huddlestone is a former professional rugby league footballer who played in the 1970s and 1980s. He played at club level for Castleford, as a second-row.

== Playing career ==
=== County Cup Final appearances ===
James Huddlestone played at prop in Castleford's 17-7 victory over Featherstone Rovers in the 1977 Yorkshire Cup Final during the 1977–78 season at Headingley, Leeds on Saturday 15 October 1977.
