= 1976–77 BBC2 Floodlit Trophy =

- Structure: Floodlit knockout championship
- Teams: 22
- Winners: Castleford
- Runners-up: Leigh

The 1976–77 BBC2 Floodlit Trophy was the twelfth occasion on which the BBC2 Floodlit Trophy competition had been held.

Castleford won the trophy by beating Leigh by the score of 12-4 (away from home on the opponent's own ground)
The match was played at Hilton Park, Leigh, now in the Metropolitan Borough of Wigan, (historically in the county of Lancashire). The attendance was 5,402, and the receipts were £2.793
Castleford had won the first three BBC2 Floodlit Trophy finals, this brought the wins up to four

== Background ==
This season saw no changes in the entrants, no new members and no withdrawals, the number remaining at twenty-two.
The format remained as used in last season's tournament, i.e. as a knock-out competition from the preliminary round through to the final.
The preliminary round involved twelve clubs, to reduce the numbers taking part in the competition proper to just sixteen.

== Competition and results ==
=== Preliminary round ===
Involved 6 matches and 12 clubs

Game No	Fixture date	Home team	Score	Away team	Venue	Att	Rec	Notes	Ref
P	Sun 29 Aug 1976	Rochdale Hornets	2-5	Widnes	Athletic Grounds				
P	Wed 8 Sep 1976	Halifax	19-25	Hull F.C.	Thrum Hall				
P	Tue 14 Sep 1976	Hull Kingston Rovers	19-12	Dewsbury	Craven Park (1)				
P	Tue 14 Sep 1976	Leigh	11-10	Warrington	Hilton Park				
P	Tue 14 Sep 1976	Wakefield Trinity	20-5	Bramley	Belle Vue				
P	Tue 14 Sep 1976	Whitehaven	25-11	Barrow	Recreation Ground			1	

=== Round 1 – first round ===
Involved 8 matches and 16 clubs

Game No	Fixture date	Home team	Score	Away team	Venue	Att	Rec	Notes	Ref
1	Tue 28 Sep 1976	Huddersfield	5-2	Wakefield Trinity	Fartown				
2	Tue 28 Sep 1976	Leigh	22-18	Salford	Hilton Park				
3	Tue 5 Oct 1976	Castleford	16-8	Hull Kingston Rovers	Wheldon Road				
4	Tue 5 Oct 1976	Keighley	2-16	Hull F.C.	Lawkholme Lane				
5	Tue 5 Oct 1976	Whitehaven	3-21	Oldham	Recreation Ground				
6	Tue 12 Oct 1976	Widnes	13-14	Wigan	Naughton Park			2	
7	Tue 19 Oct 1976	Leeds	22-10	New Hunslet	Headingley				
8	Tue 26 Oct 1976	Swinton	15-22	St. Helens	Station Road	1,265			

=== Round 2 – quarter finals ===
Involved 4 matches with 8 clubs

Game No	Fixture date	Home team	Score	Away team	Venue	Att	Rec	Notes	Ref
1	Tue 2 Nov 1976	Hull F.C.	6-0	Oldham	Boulevard				
2	Tue 9 Nov 1976	Leeds	2-17	Castleford	Headingley				
3	Tue 16 Nov 1976	Huddersfield	9-7	St. Helens	Fartown	1,787			
4	Tue 23 Nov 1976	Leigh	12-5	Wigan	Hilton Park			2	

=== Round 3 – semi-finals ===
Involved 2 matches and 4 clubs

Game No	Fixture date	Home team	Score	Away team	Venue	Att	Rec	Notes	Ref
1	Tue 30 Nov 1976	Leigh	19-10	Huddersfield	Hilton Park				
2	Tue 7 Dec 1976	Hull F.C.	8-15	Castleford	Boulevard				

=== Final ===
Game No	Fixture date	Home team	Score	Away team	Venue	Att	Rec	Notes	Ref
F	Tuesday 14 December 1976	Leigh	4-12	Castleford	Hilton Park	5,402	2.793	2 3	

==== Teams and scorers ====
Castleford	№	Leigh
	teams	
Geoff Wraith	1	Mick Hogan
Steve Fenton	2	Alan Prescott
John Joyner	3	Mick Stacey
Philip Johnson	4	John Woods
Jamie Walsh	5	Joe Walsh
Bruce Burton	6	John Taylor
Gary Stephens	7	Cliff Sayer
Paul Kahn	8	Dave Chisnall
Robert Spurr	9	Kevin Ashcroft
Alan Dickinson	10	Geoff Fletcher
Malcolm "Mal" Reilly	11	Dave Macko
Geoffrey "Sammy" Lloyd	12	Paul Grimes
Steve 'Knocker' Norton	13	Dennis Boyd
Malcolm "Mal" Reilly	Coach	Kevin Ashcroft
12	score	4
0	HT	1
	Scorers	
	Tries	
Jamie Walsh (1)	T	Joe Walsh (1)
Bruce Burton (1)	T	
	Goals	
Geoffrey "Sammy" Lloyd (3)	G	
	Drop Goals	
	DG	Kevin Ashcroft (1)
Referee		J E Jackson (Pudsey)

Scoring - Try = three points - Goal = two points - Drop goal = one point

=== The road to success ===
This tree excludes any preliminary round fixtures

First round
Leigh	22
Salford	18
Widnes	13
Wigan	14
Huddersfield	5
Wakefield Trinity	2
Swinton	16
St. Helens	22
Keighley	2
Hull F.C.	16
Whitehaven	3
Oldham	21
Leeds	22
New Hunslet	10
Castleford	16
Hull Kingston Rovers	8

Second round
Leigh	12
Wigan	5
Huddersfield	9
St. Helens	7
Hull F.C.	6
Oldham	0
Leeds	2
Castleford	17

Semi-finals
Leigh	19
Huddersfield	10
Hull F.C.	8
Castleford	15

Final
Leigh	4
Castleford	12

== Notes and comments ==
1 * Whitehaven, who joined the competition in season 1973–74, play their first game at home in the competition - they also win their first game in the competition
2 * This match was televised
3 * Hilton Park was the home ground of Leigh from 1947 to 2008. The final capacity was in the region of 11,000, much less than the record attendance of 31,326, set in 1953 for a Challenge Cup match v St. Helens

== See also ==
- 1976–77 Northern Rugby Football League season
- 1976 Lancashire Cup
- 1976 Yorkshire Cup
- BBC2 Floodlit Trophy
- Rugby league county cups
