= 1971–72 Player's No.6 Trophy =

- Structure: National knockout championship
- Teams: 32
- Winners: Halifax
- Runners-up: Wakefield Trinity

The 1971–72 Player's No.6 Trophy was a British rugby league knockout tournament. It was the first season that the competition was held.

Halifax won the trophy by beating Wakefield Trinity by the score of 22-11 in the final. The match was played at Odsal in the City of Bradford. The attendance was 7975 and receipts were £2545.

== Background ==
The council of the Rugby Football League had been investigating the possibility of another knock-out competition for several seasons, to be similar to the association football league cup competition played for by the Scottish Football Association (first competed for in 1946-47) and The Football Association (first competed for 1961). It was to be a similar knock-out structure to, and to be secondary to, the Challenge Cup. The council voted to introduce the new competition at the same time as sports sponsorship was becoming more prevalent and as a result John Player and Sons, a division of Imperial Tobacco Company, became sponsors, and the competition never became widely known as the "League Cup"

The competition ran from 1971–72 until 1995-96 and was initially intended for the professional clubs plus the two amateur BARLA National Cup finalists. In later seasons the entries were expanded to take in other amateur and French teams. The competition was dropped, the main reason being given was due to "fixture congestion", when Rugby League became a summer sport The Rugby League season always (until the onset of "Summer Rugby" in 1996) ran from around August-time through to around May-time and this "League Cup" competition always took place early in the season, in the Autumn, with the final usually taking place in late January

The competition was variably known, by its sponsorship name, as the Player's No.6 Trophy (1971–1977), the John Player Trophy (1977–1983), the John Player Special Trophy (1983–1989), and the Regal Trophy in 1989.

== Competition and results ==
=== Round 1 - First round ===
Involved 16 matches and 32 clubs

| Game No | Fixture date | Home team | Score | Away team | Venue | Att | Rec | Notes | Ref |
|---|---|---|---|---|---|---|---|---|---|
| 1 | Fri 12 Nov 1971 | Thames Board Mills | 7-27 | Huddersfield | Wilderspool | 1175 | | 1, 2 | |
| 2 | Fri 12 Nov 1971 | Ace Amateurs | 9-33 | Wigan | Central Park | 2678 | | 3, 4 | |
| 3 | Sat 13 Nov 1971 | Barrow | 10-9 | Swinton | Craven Park | | | | |
| 4 | Sat 13 Nov 1971 | Dewsbury | 5-5 | Hull F.C. | Crown Flatt | | | | |
| 5 | Sat 13 Nov 1971 | Huyton | 5-18 | Keighley | Alt Park, Huyton | | | | |
| 6 | Sat 13 Nov 1971 | Leeds | 18-8 | Leigh | Headingley | | | | |
| 7 | Sat 13 Nov 1971 | St. Helens | 37-7 | Featherstone Rovers | Knowsley Road | 3000 | | | |
| 8 | Sat 13 Nov 1971 | Workington Town | 0-10 | Blackpool Borough | Derwent Park | | | | |
| 9 | Sun 14 Nov 1971 | Batley | 5-11 | York | Mount Pleasant | | | | |
| 10 | Sun 14 Nov 1971 | Bradford Northern | 8-12 | Rochdale Hornets | Odsal | | | | |
| 11 | Sun 14 Nov 1971 | Doncaster | 4-16 | Bramley | Bentley Road Stadium/Tattersfield | | | | |
| 12 | Sun 14 Nov 1971 | Hull Kingston Rovers | 17-14 | Salford | Craven Park (1) | | | | |
| 13 | Sun 14 Nov 1971 | Hunslet | 7-7 | Castleford | Parkside | | | | |
| 14 | Sun 14 Nov 1971 | Warrington | 9-16 | Halifax | Wilderspool | | | | |
| 15 | Sun 14 Nov 1971 | Whitehaven | 5-0 | Oldham | Recreation Ground | | | | |
| 16 | Sun 14 Nov 1971 | Widnes | 10-10 | Wakefield Trinity | Naughton Park | | | | |

=== Round 1 - First round Replays ===
Involved 3 matches and 6 clubs

| Game No | Fixture date | Home team | Score | Away team | Venue | Att | Rec | Notes | Ref |
|---|---|---|---|---|---|---|---|---|---|
| 1 | Wed 17 Nov 1971 | Castleford | 9-8 | Hunslet | Wheldon Road | | | | |
| 2 | Wed 17 Nov 1971 | Wakefield Trinity | 12-10 | Widnes | Belle Vue | | | | |
| 3 | Thu 18 Nov 1971 | Hull F.C. | 22-10 | Dewsbury | Boulevard | | | | |

=== Round 2 - Second round ===
Involved 8 matches and 16 clubs

| Game No | Fixture date | Home team | Score | Away team | Venue | Att | Rec | Notes | Ref |
|---|---|---|---|---|---|---|---|---|---|
| 1 | Fri 26 Nov 1971 | Castleford | 11-13 | Leeds | Wheldon Road | | | | |
| 2 | Sat 27 Nov 1971 | Barrow | 10-6 | Huddersfield | Craven Park | | | | |
| 3 | Sat 27 Nov 1971 | Halifax | 5-3 | York | Thrum Hall | | | | |
| 4 | Sat 27 Nov 1971 | Hull Kingston Rovers | 11-18 | Wigan | Craven Park (1) | | | | |
| 5 | Sat 27 Nov 1971 | Whitehaven | 0-12 | St. Helens | Recreation Ground | 1500 | | | |
| 6 | Sun 28 Nov 1971 | Bramley | 5-10 | Wakefield Trinity | McLaren Field | | | | |
| 7 | Sun 28 Nov 1971 | Hull F.C. | 36-10 | Keighley | Boulevard | | | | |
| 8 | Sun 28 Nov 1971 | Rochdale Hornets | 4-14 | Blackpool Borough | Athletic Grounds | | | | |

=== Round 3 -Quarter-finals ===
Involved 4 matches with 8 clubs

| Game No | Fixture date | Home team | Score | Away team | Venue | Att | Rec | Notes | Ref |
|---|---|---|---|---|---|---|---|---|---|
| 1 | Sat 11 Dec 1971 | Halifax | 36-13 | Barrow | Thrum Hall | | | | |
| 2 | Sat 11 Dec 1971 | Leeds | 12-12 | Wigan | Headingley | | | | |
| 3 | Sat 11 Dec 1971 | St. Helens | 33-5 | Hull F.C. | Knowsley Road | 3467 | | | |
| 4 | Sun 12 Dec 1971 | Wakefield Trinity | 18-12 | Blackpool Borough | Belle Vue | | | | |

=== Round 3 -Quarter-finals - replays ===
Involved 1 match with 2 clubs

| Game No | Fixture date | Home team | Score | Away team | Venue | Att | Rec | Notes | Ref |
|---|---|---|---|---|---|---|---|---|---|
| 1 | Wed 15 Dec 1971 | Wigan | 5-12 | Leeds | Central Park | | | | |

=== Round 4 – Semi-finals ===
Involved 2 matches and 4 clubs

| Game No | Fixture date | Home team | Score | Away team | Venue | Att | Rec | Notes | Ref |
|---|---|---|---|---|---|---|---|---|---|
| 1 | Sat 18 Dec 1971 | Wakefield Trinity | 14-9 | St. Helens | Belle Vue | 3964 | | | |
| 2 | Sat 8 Jan 1972 | Leeds | 7-15 | Halifax | Headingley | | | | |

=== Final ===
| Game No | Fixture date | Home team | Score | Away team | Venue | Att | Rec | Notes | Ref |
|---|---|---|---|---|---|---|---|---|---|
| | Saturday 22 January 1972 | Halifax | 22-11 | Wakefield Trinity | Odsal | 7975 | 2545 | 5 | |

==== Teams and scorers ====
| Halifax | No. | Wakefield Trinity |
|---|---|---|
| | teams | |
| Tony Hepworth | 1 | Geoff Wraith |
| David Rayner | 2 | Keith Slater |
| Phil Davies | 3 | Jack Marston |
| David Willicombe | 4 | John Hegarty |
| Mike Kelly | 5 | Mick Major |
| Bruce Burton | 6 | David Topliss |
| Gordon Baker (c) | 7 | Kevin Harkin |
| Terry Dewhirst | 8 | David Jeanes |
| Roy Hawksley | 9 | Mick Morgan |
| David Callon | 10 | Steve Lyons |
| Terry Fogerty | 11 | Peter Harrison |
| John Martin | 12 | Rob Valentine |
| Tony Halmshaw | 13 | Neil Fox |
| John Sanderson (for Gordon Baker) | 14 | Bernard Ward (for Geoff Wraith) |
| Derek Reeves (for David Callon) | 15 | Ray Spencer (for Peter Harrison) |
| Les Pearce | Coach | Neil Fox |
| 22 | score | 11 |
| 7 | HT | 8 |
| | Scorers | |
| | Tries | |
| Phil Davies (1) | T | Keith Slater (1) |
| David Willicombe (1) | T | David Topliss (1) |
| Mike Kelly (1) | T | Rob Valentine (1) |
| David Callon (1) | T | |
| | Goals | |
| Bruce Burton (5) | G | Neil Fox (1) |
| Referee | | S. Shepherd (Oldham) |
| Man of the match | | Bruce Burton - Halifax - stand-off |
| Competition Sponsor | | Player's No.6 |

Scoring - Try = three points - Goal = two points - Drop goal = one point (reduced from this season)

=== Prize money ===
As part of the sponsorship deal and funds, the prize money awarded to the competing teams for this season was as follows:

| Finish Position | Cash Prize | No. receiving prize | Total cash |
|---|---|---|---|
| Winner | £5,000 | 1 | £5,000 |
| Runner-up | £2,500 | 1 | £2,500 |
| Semi-finalist | £1,000 | 2 | £2,000 |
| Loser in Rd 3 | — | 4 | — |
| Loser in Rd 2 | — | 8 | — |
| Loser in Rd 1 | — | 16 | — |
| Grand Total | | | £9,500 |

=== The road to success ===
First round
Hunslet | 7 (8)
Castleford | 7 (9)
Leeds | 18
Leigh | 8
Hull Kingston Rovers | 17
Salford | 14
Ace Amateurs (Hull) | 9
Wigan | 33
Warrington | 9
Halifax | 16
Batley | 5
York | 11
Barrow | 10
Swinton | 9
Thames Board Mills (Warrington) | 7
Huddersfield | 27
Doncaster | 4
Bramley | 16
Widnes | 10 (10)
Wakefield Trinity | 10 (12)
Bradford Northern | 8
Rochdale Hornets | 12
Workington Town | 0
Blackpool Borough | 10
Whitehaven | 5
Oldham | 0
St. Helens | 37
Featherstone Rovers | 7
Dewsbury | 5 (10)
Hull F.C. | 5 (22)
Huyton | 5
Keighley | 18

Second round
Castleford | 11
Leeds | 13
Hull Kingston Rovers | 11
Wigan | 18
Halifax | 5
York | 3
Barrow | 10
Huddersfield | 6
Bramley | 5
Wakefield Trinity | 10
Rochdale Hornets | 4
Blackpool Borough | 14
Whitehaven | 0
St. Helens | 12
Hull F.C. | 36
Keighley | 10

Third round
Leeds | 12 (5)
Wigan | 12 (12)
Halifax | 36
Barrow | 13
Wakefield Trinity | 18
Blackpool Borough | 12
St. Helens | 33
Hull F.C. | 5

Semi-finals
Leeds | 7
Halifax | 15
Wakefield Trinity | 14
St. Helens | 9

Final
Halifax | 22
Wakefield Trinity | 11

== Player's Top Try Contest ==
As part of the sponsorship deal, a Top Try Contest was held. This involved all the professional first round Players No.6 Trophy Losers.

One match was played by each club and the four clubs scoring the most tries received prize money.

This competition was not a success and was only held for this season.

This series Involved 7 matches and 14 clubs.

| Game No | Fixture date | Home team | Score | Away team | Venue | Home Tries | Away Tries | Notes | Ref |
|---|---|---|---|---|---|---|---|---|---|
| 1 | Fri 26 Nov 1971 | Widnes | 32-3 | Huyton | Naughton Park | 8 | 1 | | |
| 2 | Fri 26 Nov 1971 | Salford | 38-7 | Warrington | The Willows | 10 | 1 | | |
| 3 | Sat 27 Nov 1971 | Doncaster | 12-30 | Dewsbury | Bentley Road Stadium/Tattersfield | 2 | 8 | | |
| 4 | Sat 27 Nov 1971 | Workington Town | 5-9 | Bradford Northern | Derwent Park | 1 | 1 | | |
| 5 | Sun 28 Nov 1971 | Featherstone Rovers | 54-0 | Batley | Post Office Road | 12 | | | |
| 6 | Sun 28 Nov 1971 | Oldham | 5-11 | Leigh | Watersheddings | 1 | 1 | | |
| 7 | Sun 28 Nov 1971 | Swinton | 53-6 | Batley | Station Road | 13 | 2 | | |

=== The table ===
The club scoring the most tries finished top.

In the case of a tie, the deciding items were :-

- 1 The club scoring the most tries
- 2 The club scoring the most points
- 3 The club with the fewest points against

The table showing finishing positions and the awards were as follows :

| Place | Position | Team | Number of Tries | Prize Money | Points Scored | Points Against |
|---|---|---|---|---|---|---|
| 1 | Winners | Swinton | 13 | 500 | 53 | 6 |
| 2 | Second Place | Featherstone Rovers | 12 | 250 | 54 | 0 |
| 3 | Third Place | Salford | 10 | 150 | 38 | 7 |
| 4 | Fourth Place | Widnes | 8 | 100 | 32 | 3 |
| 5 | * | Dewsbury | 8 | | 30 | 12 |
| 6 | | Doncaster | 2 | | 12 | 30 |
| 7 | | Batley | 2 | | 6 | 53 |
| 8 | | Leigh | 1 | | 11 | 5 |
| 9 | | Bradford Northern | 1 | | 9 | 5 |
| 10 | | Warrington | 1 | | 7 | 38 |
| 11 | | Workington Town | 1 | | 5 | 9 |
| 12 | | Oldham | 1 | | 5 | 11 |
| 13 | | Huyton | 1 | | 3 | 32 |
| 14 | | Batley | 0 | | 0 | 54 |

Note * Widnes took 4th place ahead of Dewsbury as they scored more points - and therefore were awarded the prize money

== Notes and comments ==
1 * Thames Board Mills were a Junior (amateur) club from Warrington
2 * Thames Board Mills opted to play the match at Wilderspool, the home of Warrington 3 * Ace Amateurs were a Junior (amateur) club from Hull
4 * Ace Amateurs were drawn at Home but agreed to switch the venue to Central Park, the home ground of Wigan
5 * Odsal is the home ground of Bradford Northern from 1890 to 2010 and the current capacity is in the region of 26,000, The ground is famous for hosting the largest attendance at an English sports ground when 102,569 (it was reported that over 120,000 actually attended as several areas of boundary fencing collapse under the sheer weight of numbers) attended the replay of the Challenge Cup final on 5 May 1954 to see Halifax v Warrington

== See also ==
- 1971–72 Northern Rugby Football League season
- 1971 Lancashire Cup
- 1971 Yorkshire Cup
- Player's No.6 Trophy
- Rugby league county cups
