= Alan Dickinson =

English rugby league footballer

Personal information
- Born: c. 1947 (age 77–78) unknown

Playing information
- Position: Centre, Stand-off, Prop, Hooker, Second-row
Club
Years	Team	Pld	T	G	FG	P
c. 1963–≤71	Keighley	c. 170
1971–79	Castleford	139	14	0	0	42
1978/79–≥78/79	Keighley	c. 6
1981	→ Wakefield Trinity (loan)	5	0	0	0	0
c. 1982	Dewsbury
	Total		14	0	0	42
Representative
Years	Team	Pld	T	G	FG	P
1977	Yorkshire	1

Alan Dickinson is a former professional rugby league footballer who played in the 1960s, 1970s and 1980s. He played at representative level for Yorkshire, and at club level for Keighley (two spells), Castleford, Wakefield Trinity (loan) and Dewsbury, as a centre, stand-off, prop, hooker or second-row.

== Playing career ==
=== County honours ===
Alan Dickinson won a cap for Yorkshire while at Castleford; he played left-prop in the 12-12 draw with Cumberland at Recreation Ground, Whitehaven on Tuesday 15 February 1977.

=== County Cup Final appearances ===
Alan Dickinson played left-second-row in Castleford's 7-11 defeat by Hull Kingston Rovers in the 1971 Yorkshire Cup Final during the 1971–72 season at Belle Vue, Wakefield on Saturday 21 August 1971.

=== BBC2 Floodlit Trophy Final appearances ===
Alan Dickinson played right-prop in Castleford's 12-4 victory over Leigh in the 1976 BBC2 Floodlit Trophy Final during the 1976–77 season at Hilton Park, Leigh on Tuesday 14 December 1976.

=== Player's No.6 Trophy Final appearances ===
Alan Dickinson played right-prop in Castleford's 25-15 victory over Blackpool Borough in the 1976–77 Player's No.6 Trophy Final during the 1976–77 season at The Willows, Salford on Saturday 22 January 1977.

=== Club career ===
Alan Dickinson made his début for Wakefield Trinity during April 1981, and he played his last match for Wakefield Trinity during the 1980–81 season.
