= Les Sheard =

English RL coach and former England international rugby league footballer

Personal information
- Full name: Leslie Sheard
- Born: c. 1945 (age 80–81)

Playing information

Rugby union
Club
Years	Team	Pld	T	G	FG	P
1968–1969	Loughborough Colleges
1969–1970	Wakefield RFC
	Total	0	0	0	0	0
Representative
Years	Team	Pld	T	G	FG	P
1969–1970	Yorkshire	7
1970	NE Counties	1

Rugby league
- Position: Fullback, Centre
Club
Years	Team	Pld	T	G	FG	P
1971–72	Castleford	9	0	1	0	2
1972–1980	Wakefield Trinity	171	31	5	0	103
1980–81	York	33	11	0	0	33
1981–82	Huddersfield	25	3	0	0	9
	Total	238	45	6	0	147
Representative
Years	Team	Pld	T	G	FG	P
1974	Yorkshire	1	0	0
1975	England	1	0	0	0	0

Coaching information
Club
Years	Team	Gms	W	D	L	W%
1981–82	Huddersfield

Leslie Sheard (born c. 1945) is an English former rugby union and professional rugby league footballer who played in the 1970s and 1980s, and coached rugby league in the 1980s. He played club level rugby union (RU) for Wakefield RFC, and representative level rugby league (RL) for England and Yorkshire, and at club level for Castleford, Wakefield Trinity, York (captain), and Huddersfield, as a fullback or centre, and coached club level rugby league for Huddersfield.

== Background ==
Les Sheard worked as a school teacher, and as of 1983 he lives in Devon.

== Playing career ==
=== Club career ===
Sheard made his début for Wakefield Trinity during March 1972.

Sheard appeared as a substitute (replacing fullback Geoff Wraith) in Wakefield Trinity's 2–7 defeat by Leeds in the 1973 Yorkshire Cup Final during the 1973–74 season at Headingley, Leeds on Saturday 20 October 1973, and played fullback in the 13–16 defeat by Hull Kingston Rovers in the 1974 Yorkshire Cup Final during the 1974–75 season at Headingley, Leeds on Saturday 26 October 1974.

Sheard played fullback in Wakefield Trinity's 3–12 defeat by Widnes in the 1979 Challenge Cup Final during the 1978–79 season at Wembley Stadium, London on Saturday 5 May 1979, in front of a crowd of a crowd of 94,218.

=== Representative honours ===
Sheard won a cap for England (RL) while at Wakefield Trinity in 1975 against Wales.

Sheard won cap(s) for Yorkshire while at Wakefield Trinity.
