= Derek Foster (rugby league) =

English RL coach and former rugby league footballer

Playing information
- Position: Wing, Centre
Club
| Years | Team | Pld | T | G | FG | P |
|---|---|---|---|---|---|---|
| 1966–74 | Castleford | 131 | 53 | 0 | 0 | 159 |
| ≤1978–≥81 | York | 12 | 2 | 0 | 0 | 8 |
| | Total | 143 | 55 | 0 | 0 | 167 |

Coaching information
Club
| Years | Team | Gms | W | D | L | W% |
| 1992 | York Wasps | 0 | 0 | 0 | 0 |

Derek Foster is a former professional rugby league footballer who played in the 1960s, 1970s and 1980s. He played at club level for Castleford, and York, as a wing or centre.

== Playing career ==
=== County Cup Final appearances ===
Derek Foster played on the wing and scored a try in Castleford's 7-11 defeat by Hull Kingston Rovers in the 1971 Yorkshire Cup Final during the 1971–72 season at Belle Vue, Wakefield on Saturday 21 August 1971, and played at centre in York's 8-18 defeat by Bradford Northern in the 1978–79 Yorkshire Cup Final during the 1978–79 season at Headingley, Leeds on Saturday 28 October 1978.

=== Career records ===
Castleford's most tries scored in a match record is 5-tries, and is jointly held by; Derek Foster against Hunslet on 10 November 1972, John Joyner against Millom on 16 September 1973, Stephen Fenton against Dewsbury on 27 January 1978, Ian French against Hunslet on 9 February 1986, and St. John Ellis against Whitehaven on 10 December 1989.
