= Jack Marston =

English rugby league footballer (1948–2013)

Personal information
- Full name: John Marston
- Born: second ¼ 1948 Hemsworth district, England
- Died: 13 March 2013 (aged 64) St Gemma's Hospice, Leeds, England

Playing information
- Position: Centre
Club
Years	Team	Pld	T	G	FG	P
1969–73	Wakefield Trinity	105	35
1973–76	Bradford Northern	42	3	0	0	9
≥1976–≥76	York
	Total	147	38	0	0	9
Representative
Years	Team	Pld	T	G	FG	P
1977	Yorkshire	1	1	0	0	3

John Marston (birth registered second ¼ 1948 – 13 March 2013) was an English professional rugby league footballer who played in the 1960s and 1970s. He played at representative level for Yorkshire, and at club level for Hemsworth Miners Welfare ARLFC, Wakefield Trinity, Bradford Northern and York, as a centre.

== Background ==
Jack Marston's birth was registered in Hemsworth district, West Riding of Yorkshire, England, and he died aged 64 in St Gemma's Hospice, Leeds, West Yorkshire, England.

== Playing career ==
=== County honours ===
Jack Marston represented Yorkshire.

=== Player's No.6 Trophy Final appearances ===
Jack Marston played in Wakefield Trinity's 11-22 defeat by Halifax in the 1971–72 Player's No.6 Trophy Final during the 1971-72 season at Odsal Stadium, Bradford on Saturday 22 January 1972.

=== Club career ===
Jack Marston made his début for Wakefield Trinity (replacing Neil Fox who had been sold to Bradford Northern the previous day) in the 8-11 defeat by Featherstone Rovers at Post Office Road, Featherstone on Saturday 23 August 1969.
