= Paul Kahn (rugby league) =

English rugby league footballer

Playing information
- Position: Prop
Club
Years	Team	Pld	T	G	FG	P
1976–78	Castleford	24	3	0	0	9

Paul Kahn is a former professional rugby league footballer who played in the 1970s. He played at club level for Castleford.

== Playing career ==
=== BBC2 Floodlit Trophy Final appearances ===
Paul Kahn played at prop in Castleford's 12–4 victory over Leigh in the 1976 BBC2 Floodlit Trophy Final during the 1976–77 season at Hilton Park, Leigh on Tuesday 14 December 1976.

=== Player's No.6 Trophy Final appearances ===
Paul Kahn played at prop in Castleford's 25–15 victory over Blackpool Borough in the 1976–77 Player's No.6 Trophy Final during the 1976–77 season at The Willows, Salford on Saturday 22 January 1977.
