= Alan Ackroyd =

English rugby league player (born 1948)

Personal information
- Born: 27 December 1948 (age 77) Kippax, England

Playing information
- Height: 6 ft 0 in (1.83 m)
- Weight: 19 st 0 lb (121 kg)
- Position: Prop
Club
Years	Team	Pld	T	G	FG	P
1969–76	Castleford	114	23	56	1	183
1980–81	Bramley	5	1	0	0	3
1981–82	Halifax	36	8	0	0	24
	Total	155	32	56	1	210

Alan Ackroyd (born 27 December 1948) is an English former professional rugby league footballer who played in the 1960s, 1970s and 1980s. He played at club level for Castleford, Halifax, and Bramley, as a prop.

== Background ==
Alan Ackroyd was born in Kippax, West Riding of Yorkshire, England.

== Playing career ==
During his time at Castleford he scored one 2-point drop goal.

=== County Cup Final appearances ===
Ackroyd appeared as a substitute (replacing Prop Ian Van Bellen) and scored two goals in Castleford's 7–11 defeat by Hull Kingston Rovers in the 1971 Yorkshire Cup Final during the 1971–72 season at Belle Vue, Wakefield on Saturday 21 August 1971.
