= Brett French =

Australian rugby league footballer

Personal information
- Born: 27 March 1962 (age 64) Brisbane, Queensland, Australia

Playing information
- Position: Centre, Wing
Club
Years	Team	Pld	T	G	FG	P
198?–8?	Wynnum Manly
1985	St Helens R.F.C.	24	14	0	0	56
1986–89	North Sydney Bears	66	17	0	0	68
1990–91	Gold Coast Seagulls	35	11	0	0	44
	Total	125	42	0	0	168
Representative
Years	Team	Pld	T	G	FG	P
1983–88	Queensland	5	1	0	0	4
- Relatives: Ian French (brother)

Brett French (born 27 March 1962) is an Australian former rugby league footballer who played in the 1980s. A Queensland State of Origin representative, he played club football in Brisbane, Sydney and the Gold Coast, plus in England for St Helens R.F.C. He is also the brother of fellow Queensland Maroon Ian French.

Brett French scored the match-winning try for Wynnum-Manly in the 1982 Brisbane Rugby League premiership's grand final victory over Souths.
