= Gareth Stephens =

Wales international rugby league footballer

Personal information
- Full name: Gareth Stephens
- Born: 15 April 1974 (age 50); Pontefract, England

Playing information
- Position: Stand-off, Scrum-half
Club
Years	Team	Pld	T	G	FG	P
1991–94	Leeds	35	5	0	0	20
1994–96	Castleford	26	4	0	0	16
1996–97	Hull FC	19	3	0	0	12
1997(loan)	→Workington Town	0	0	0	0	0
1997–99	Sheffield Eagles	28	5	0	0	20
2000	Halifax Blue Sox
2001	York Wasps	4	0	0	0	0
	Total	112	17	0	0	68
Representative
Years	Team	Pld	T	G	FG	P
1992–95	Great Britain U-21s	6	2	0	0	8
1995–98	Wales	4	2	0	0	8
- Father: Gary Stephens
- Relatives: Dean Hanson (cousin)

Gareth Stephens (born 15 April 1974) is a former professional rugby league footballer who played as a stand-off or scrum-half in the 1990s and 2000s. He played at representative level for Great Britain (Under-21s), and Wales, and at club level for Leeds where he signed a record schoolboy contract and made his first team debut at the age of 17, Castleford Tigers, Hull FC, Sheffield Eagles and York Wasps.

== Background ==
Stephens was born in Pontefract, West Yorkshire, England, and he is the son of Gary Stephens, former rugby league international footballer of the 1960s, 1970s and 1980s. Gareth Stephens is also the cousin of Dean Hanson, the rugby league prop, second-row, or loose forward of the 1980s and 1990s for Halifax and the Illawarra Steelers.

== Playing career ==
=== Club career ===
Stephens started his career at Leeds, making his début in September 1991. He was signed by Castleford for £65000 in July 1994. He went on to play for Hull FC, Sheffield Eagles, Halifax Blue Sox and York Wasps.

=== International honours ===
Stephens won caps at Great Britain academy and U21 level along with four caps for Wales between 1995 and 1998, including at the 1995 Rugby League World Cup.
