= Keith Worsley =

English rugby league footballer

Personal information
- Born: fourth 1/4 1952 (age 73–74) Pontefract district, England

Playing information
- Position: Centre
Club
| Years | Team | Pld | T | G | FG | P |
|---|---|---|---|---|---|---|
| 1971–80 | Castleford | 153 | 49 | 0 | 0 | 147 |
| 1980–≥81 | York |
| | Total | 153 | 49 | 0 | 0 | 147 |
Representative
| Years | Team | Pld | T | G | FG | P |
| 1972–73 | Yorkshire | 2 | 0 | 0 | 0 | 0 |

Keith Worsley (fourth 1/4 1952) is an English former professional rugby league footballer who played in the 1970s and 1980s. He played at representative level for Yorkshire, and at club level for Castleford and York, as a centre.

== Background ==
Keith Worsley's birth was registered in Pontefract district, West Riding of Yorkshire.

== Playing career ==
=== County honours ===
Keith Worsley won caps playing at centre for Yorkshire while at Castleford in the 32–18 victory over Lancashire at Castleford's stadium on 11 October 1972, and the 20–7 victory over Lancashire at Leeds' stadium on 17 January 1973.

=== County Cup Final appearances ===
Keith Worsley played at centre in Castleford's 7–11 defeat by Hull Kingston Rovers in the 1971 Yorkshire Cup Final during the 1971–72 season at Belle Vue, Wakefield on Saturday 21 August 1971.
