= 1973–74 Yorkshire Cup =

- Structure: Regional knockout championship
- Teams: 16
- Winners: Leeds
- Runners-up: Wakefield Trinity

The 1973–74 Yorkshire Cup was the sixty-sixth occasion on which the Yorkshire Cup Rugby competition had been held.

Leeds won the trophy by beating Wakefield Trinity by the score of 7–2. The match was played at Headingley, Leeds, now in West Yorkshire. The attendance was 7,621 and receipts were £3,728.

This was Leeds' fourth victory (and the second of two consecutive victories) in what would be eight times in the space of thirteen seasons. It was also the first of two consecutive Yorkshire Cup final appearances by Wakefield Trinity, both of which would result in defeat

== Background ==
This season there were no junior/amateur clubs taking part, no new entrants and no "leavers" and so the total of entries remained the same at sixteen. This in turn resulted in no byes in the first round.

== Competition and results ==
=== Round 1 ===
Involved 8 matches (with no byes) and 16 clubs

Game No	Fixture date	Home team	Score	Away team	Venue	Att	Notes	Ref
1	Fri 31 Aug 1973	Castleford	32–8	York	Wheldon Road	1697		
2	Sat 01 Sep 1973	Batley	23–8	Hull Kingston Rovers	Mount Pleasant	691		
3	Sat 01 Sep 1973	Halifax	15–17	Keighley	Thrum Hall	1352		
4	Sat 01 Sep 1973	Hull F.C.	8–10	Huddersfield	Boulevard	1800		
5	Sat 01 Sep 1973	Leeds	30–5	Dewsbury	Headingley	5882		
6	Sun 02 Sep 1973	Bradford Northern	29–7	New Hunslet	Odsal	4418	(Note: The first Yorkshire Cup match played by the newly re-formed New Hunslet club)	
7	Sun 02 Sep 1973	Bramley	4–19	Featherstone Rovers	McLaren Field	1950		
8	Sun 02 Sep 1973	Wakefield Trinity	39–7	Doncaster	Belle Vue	2548		

=== Round 2 - Quarter-finals ===
Involved 4 matches and 8 clubs

Game No	Fixture date	Home team	Score	Away team	Venue	Att	Notes	Ref
1	Fri 07 Sep 1973	Castleford	29–8	Huddersfield	Wheldon Road	1700		
2	Sat 08 Sep 1973	Batley	2–27	Leeds	Mount Pleasant	2542		
3	Sun 09 Sep 1973	Bradford Northern	27–14	Featherstone Rovers	Odsal	5369		
4	Sun 09 Sep 1973	Keighley	4–39	Wakefield Trinity	Lawkholme Lane	2620		

=== Round 3 – Semi-finals ===
Involved 2 matches and 4 clubs

Game No	Fixture date	Home team	Score	Away team	Venue	Att	Notes	Ref
1	Tue 25 Sep 1973	Leeds	10–5	Bradford Northern	Headingley	6416		
2	Tue 26 Sep 1973	Wakefield Trinity	19–18	Castleford	Belle Vue	4642		

=== Final ===
Fixture date	Home team	Score	Away team	Venue	Att	Rec	Notes	Ref
Saturday 20 October 1973	Leeds	7–2	Wakefield Trinity	Headingley	7,621	£3,728	(Note: Headingley, Leeds, is the home ground of Leeds RLFC with a capacity of 21,000. The record attendance was 40,175 for a league match between Leeds and Bradford Northern on 21 May 1947.)	

==== Teams and scorers ====
Leeds	№	Wakefield Trinity
	teams	
John Holmes	1	Geoff Wraith
John Langley	2	David Smith
Syd Hynes	3	Terry "TC" Crook
Les Dyl	4	John Hegarty
John Atkinson	5	Barry Parker
Alan Hardisty (c)	6	David Topliss
Keith Hepworth	7	Joseph "Joe" Bonnar
David Jeanes	8	Rob Valentine
David Ward	9	Mick Morgan (c)
Geoffrey Clarkson	10	Roy Bratt
Graham Eccles	11	David Knowles
Phil Cookson	12	Ken Endersby
Ray Batten	13	Ernest Holmes
David Marshall (for John Langley)	14	Les Sheard (for Geoff Wraith 33m)
Bill Ramsey (for David Jeanes)	15	George Ballantyne (for David Knowles 57m)
Eric Ashton	Coach	Neil Fox
7	score	2
5	HT	2
	Scorers	
	Tries	
John Langley (1)	T	
	Goals	
David Marshall (1)	G	Terry "TC" Crook (1)
Syd Hynes (1)	G	
Referee		Michael "Mick" J. Naughton (Widnes)
White Rose Trophy for Man of the match		Keith Hepworth - Leeds - scrum-half

Scoring - Try = three points - Goal = two points - Drop goal = one point

=== The road to success ===
First round
Batley	23
Hull Kingston Rovers	8
Leeds	30
Dewsbury	5
Bradford Northern	29
New Hunslet	7
Bramley	4
Featherstone Rovers	19
Halifax	15
Keighley	17
Wakefield Trinity	39
Doncaster	7
Castleford	32
York	8
Hull F.C.	8
Huddersfield	10

Second round
Batley	2
Leeds	27
Bradford Northern	27
Featherstone Rovers	14
Keighley	4
Wakefield Trinity	39
Castleford	29
Huddersfield	8

Semi-finals
Leeds	10
Bradford Northern	5
Wakefield Trinity	19
Castleford	18

Final
Leeds	7
Wakefield Trinity	2

== See also ==
- 1973–74 Northern Rugby Football League season
- Rugby league county cups
