= Tony Miller (rugby league) =

English rugby league footballer

Playing information
- Position: Hooker
Club
| Years | Team | Pld | T | G | FG | P |
|---|---|---|---|---|---|---|
| 1965–74 | Castleford | 135 | 15 | 0 | 0 | 45 |
| 1975–77 | Warrington | 44 | 8 | 0 | 3 | 27 |
| | Total | 179 | 23 | 0 | 3 | 72 |

Tony Miller is a former professional rugby league footballer who played in the 1960s and 1970s. He played at club level for Castleford and Warrington, as a hooker.

== Playing career ==
=== County Cup Final appearances ===
Tony Miller played hooker in Castleford's 7–11 defeat by Hull Kingston Rovers in the 1971 Yorkshire Cup Final during the 1971–72 season at Belle Vue, Wakefield on Saturday 21 August 1971.
