= George Ballantyne =

English rugby league footballer

Personal information
- Born: 27 May 1952 (age 72); Leeds, England

Playing information
- Height: 6 ft 1 in (185 cm)
- Weight: 20 st 0 lb (127 kg)
- Position: Prop, Second-row
Club
Years	Team	Pld	T	G	FG	P
1968–78	Wakefield Trinity	200	20	0	0	60
1978–83	Castleford	45	6			18
1981	→ York (loan)
1981	→ Keighley (loan)
1981	→ Hunslet (loan)
1983	→ Bramley (loan)
	Total	245	26	0	0	78
Representative
Years	Team	Pld	T	G	FG	P
1973–78	Yorkshire	2	0	0	0	0

George Ballantyne (born 27 May 1952) is an English former professional rugby league footballer who played in the 1960s, 1970s and 1980s. He played at representative level for Yorkshire, and at club level for Wakefield Trinity, Bramley, York, Keighley, Hunslet and Castleford, as a prop, or second-row.

== Background ==
George Ballantyne was born in Leeds, West Riding of Yorkshire, England.

== Playing career ==
=== Wakefield Trinity ===
Ballantyne made his début for Wakefield Trinity on 27 January 1969, playing second-row in the 14–23 defeat by Hull Kingston Rovers at Belle Vue, Wakefield. He is the youngest forward to make his début for Wakefield Trinity, aged 16 years and eight months old.

Ballantyne played as a substitute, (replacing second-row David Knowles) in Wakefield Trinity's 2-7 defeat by Leeds in the 1973 Yorkshire Cup Final during the 1973–74 season at Headingley, Leeds on Saturday 20 October 1973, and played prop in the 13–16 defeat by Hull Kingston Rovers in the 1974 Yorkshire Cup Final during the 1974–75 season at Headingley, Leeds on Saturday 26 October 1974.

=== Castleford ===
Ballantyne was transferred from Wakefield Trinity to Castleford in 1978 for a then Castleford club record fee of £11,000.

=== County honours ===
George Ballantyne won caps for Yorkshire while at Wakefield Trinity against Cumberland at Bramley's stadium 1973, and while at Castleford he played prop in the 7–23 defeat by Lancashire at Widnes' stadium on 27 September 1978.

== Personal life ==
George Ballantyne is the grandfather of the Prop for Leeds Rhinos (Scholarship), Hunslet Parkside Hawks, and Wakefield Trinity (Under-20s), James Healey.
