= Mick Morgan =

English RL coach and former England international rugby league footballer

Personal information
- Born: 30 September 1948 (age 77) Featherstone, England

Playing information
- Position: Centre, Prop, Hooker, Loose forward
Club
Years	Team	Pld	T	G	FG	P
1967–77	Wakefield Trinity	271	77			228
1977–78	York	34	12			36
1978–81	Featherstone Rovers	94	30
1981–83	Carlisle	57	28
1983–86	Oldham	92	6			23
1986–89	Castleford	0	0			0
	Total	548	153	0	0	287
Representative
Years	Team	Pld	T	G	FG	P
1973–85	Yorkshire	9	3	0	0	9
1975	England	7	1	0	0	3

Coaching information
Club
Years	Team	Gms	W	D	L	W%
1982–83	Carlisle
1997	Castleford	4	0	0	4	0
	Total	4	0	0	4	0

Mick Morgan (born 30 September 1948) is an English former professional rugby league footballer who played in the 1960s, 1970s and 1980s, and coached in the 1980s and 1990s. He played at representative level for England and Yorkshire, and at club level for Wakefield Trinity (captain), York, Featherstone Rovers (captain), Carlisle, Oldham and Castleford (A-Team) as a centre, prop, hooker or loose forward, and coached at club level for Carlisle and Castleford.

== Background ==
Morgan was born in Featherstone, West Riding of Yorkshire, England, on 30 September 1948. He was a pupil at Normanton Grammar School.

== Playing career ==
=== Club career ===
Morgan started his career in the junior ranks at Featherstone Rovers before signing his first professional contract at Wakefield Trinity in 1965, he made his début for Wakefield Trinity he played centre against Batley at Mount Pleasant, Batley on Friday 1 April 1967.

He played hooker in Wakefield Trinity's 11–22 defeat by Halifax in the 1971–72 Player's No.6 Trophy Final during the 1971–72 season at Odsal Stadium, Bradford on Saturday 22 January 1972. He also played hooker, and was captain in Wakefield Trinity's 2–7 defeat by Leeds in the 1973–74 Yorkshire Cup Final during the 1973–74 season at Headingley, Leeds on Saturday 20 October 1973, and played loose forward, and was captain in the 13–16 defeat by Hull Kingston Rovers in the 1974–75 Yorkshire Cup Final during the 1974–75 season at Headingley, Leeds on Saturday 26 October 1974.

His Testimonial match at Wakefield Trinity was the 13–5 victory over Featherstone Rovers at Belle Vue, Wakefield on Thursday 1 January 1976. In 1978 he moved to York for the 1978–79 season. During his time at Oldham he scored one 3-point try and five 4-point tries.

=== Representative career ===
Morgan won caps for England while at Wakefield Trinity in 1975 against France (sub), and Wales, in the 1975 Rugby League World Cup against France (sub), Wales, New Zealand (sub), and Australia, and in 1975 against Papua New Guinea.

He also won cap(s) for Yorkshire while at Wakefield Trinity.

== Post-playing career ==
After finishing his playing career, Morgan became a club commentator for Castleford. His colourful commentary is particularly well known for an outburst he made during the 1993–94 Regal Trophy Final between Castleford and Wigan following a clash between Kelvin Skerrett and Andy Hay.

Morgan has written his autobiography entitled I Can't Spake in collaboration with Steve Till for publication on 25 January 2018 (Black Tree Publishers).

== Honours ==
Club

- Second Division Championship: 1979–80

Individual

- Man of Steel: 1982
