= Graham Blakeway =

English rugby league footballer

Playing information
- Position: Loose forward
Club
Years	Team	Pld	T	G	FG	P
1968–72	Castleford	23	2	5	0	16

Graham Blakeway is a former professional rugby league footballer who played in the 1960s and 1970s. He played at club level for Normanton, and Castleford.

== Playing career ==
=== County Cup Final appearances ===
Graham Blakeway played loose forward in Castleford's 7-11 defeat by Hull Kingston Rovers in the 1971 Yorkshire Cup Final during the 1971–72 season at Belle Vue, Wakefield on Saturday 21 August 1971.
