= Grundy Hill =

Former association football stadium

Coordinates: 53°35′49.89″N 2°32′36.23″W

Grundy Hill was the former home stadium of Horwich RMI association football club in Horwich, Greater Manchester, England, near the Horwich Leisure Centre.

Postcard of Grundy Hill

The ground had a capacity of approximately 5,000 spectators, with 500 being seated. The terraces were covered on three sides and featured railings.

Grundy Hill's pitch famously sloped both downwards and also side-to-side, and was reputed to have its own microclimate. "Grundy Hill sloped 16 feet (4.9 m) from top diagonal to bottom diagonal and had the contours of corrugated iron, but until the new footballing nanny state prohibited such extreme drops, the ground was Horwich's prime asset." One fan recalled that, as a boy, it was his impression "that the base of the corner flag was level with the top of the crossbar — on the same goal line." From the stands, fans had views over the field's slopes to Rivington Pike.

In 1994, the football club sold Grundy Hill to a housing developer, and moved several miles south to Leigh's Hilton Park in time for the 1995–96 season. The move also led to the club renaming itself Leigh RMI after its new home town, although the club would subsequently change its name to Leigh Genesis F.C. The University of Bolton stadium, the current home of Bolton Wanderers, is located near Horwich, within sight of the old location of Grundy Hill. The stadium was subsequently leveled, and a residential housing development now sits on the former site of Grundy Hill.
