= Ian French =

Australian rugby league footballer

Personal information
- Full name: Ian French
- Born: 28 December 1960 (age 64); Brisbane, Queensland, Australia

Playing information
- Position: Second-row, Lock
Club
Years	Team	Pld	T	G	FG	P
	Wynnum Manly
1985–86	Castleford	20	11	0	0	44
1987–90	North Sydney Bears	71	15	0	0	60
	Total	91	26	0	0	104
Representative
Years	Team	Pld	T	G	FG	P
1985–87	Queensland	9	3	0	0	12
- Source: As of 24 January 2019
- Relatives: Brett French (brother)

Ian French (born 28 December 1960) is an Australian former rugby league footballer who played in the 1980s and 1990s. French is the brother of fellow Queensland State of Origin player Brett French. While playing in the Brisbane Rugby League premiership in 1985, French won the Rothmans Medal as player of the season.

== Playing career ==
=== Challenge Cup Final appearances ===
French played loose forward for Castleford in their 15–14 victory over Hull Kingston Rovers in the 1986 Challenge Cup Final during the 1985–86 season at Wembley Stadium, London on Saturday 3 May 1986.

=== Career records ===
Castleford's most tries scored in a match record is 5-tries, and is jointly held by; Derek Foster against Hunslet on 10 November 1972, John Joyner against Millom on 16 September 1973, Stephen Fenton against Dewsbury on 27 January 1978, Ian French against Hunslet on 9 February 1986, and St. John Ellis against Whitehaven on 10 December 1989.
