= Terry Crook =

English rugby league footballer and coach

Personal information
- Born: 27 November 1947 (age 77); Wakefield, England

Playing information
- Position: Fullback, Wing, Centre
Club
Years	Team	Pld	T	G	FG	P
1967–77	Wakefield Trinity	223	43	325	3	782
1977–79	Bramley
1979–82	Wakefield Trinity	17	0	0	0	0
1982–84	Batley
	Total	240	43	325	3	782
Representative
Years	Team	Pld	T	G	FG	P
1977	Yorkshire	1	0	0	0	0

Coaching information
Club
Years	Team	Gms	W	D	L	W%
1982–84	Batley
1987–88	Dewsbury
	Total	0	0	0	0

Terry Crook (born 27 November 1947) is an English former professional rugby league footballer who played in the 1960s, 1970s and 1980s, and coached in the 1980s. He played at representative level for Yorkshire, and at club level for Wakefield Trinity (two spells), Bramley and Batley (player-coach), as a fullback, wing, or centre and coached at club level for Batley and Dewsbury.

== Background ==
Terry Crook was born in Outwood, Wakefield, West Riding of Yorkshire,

== Playing career ==
=== Club career ===
Terry Crook signed for Wakefield Trinity in April 1967, from the Wakefield Trinity Juniors, making his début in an away league game at Keighley on 11 October 1967. He played three games in that first 1967–68 season with his second ever game against the 1967 Australian Kangaroos. Although not part of the team he was part of the club that won the 1967 and 1968 RL Championships. He scored his first try at Keighley in November 1969, but it was not until the 1971–72 season that he started to establish himself as a first team regular, playing eleven games at full back with six on the wing. He also kicked 32 goals in this season, including nine against Workington Town in September 1971, three off the club record, extending this to ten goals in the home game with Batley in December 1971, two off the club record.

The following season he moved into the centres and played another thirty games. In October 1973 he played against the Australian Kangaroos for a second time. Crook played at centre and scored a goal in Wakefield Trinity's 2–7 defeat by Leeds in the 1973 Yorkshire Cup Final during the 1973–74 season at Headingley, Leeds on 20 October 1973, and played at centre and scored two goals in the 13–16 defeat by Hull Kingston Rovers in the 1974 Yorkshire Cup Final during the 1974–75 season at Headingley, Leeds on 26 October 1974. Appearances and goals continued over the following years, earning him a testimonial in 1977, the same year he gained his only Yorkshire appearance. He played his last game of his first stint, at loose forward at Salford in December 1977. He was transferred to Bramley after his testimonial year.

He returned to Wakefield Trinity a year later and played in the second row at Castleford in the BBC2 Floodlit Trophy in September 1979. He was now part of the coaching staff and played thirteen games in the 1979–80 season. Another game followed in 1980–81 with his final three coming in 1981–82. His last ever Wakefield Trinity game was at Whitehaven in a 9–9 draw on 3 January 1982, playing at fullback.

=== Drop-goals (field-goals) ===
Terry Crook appeared to have scored three drop-goals for Wakefield Trinity, but prior to the 1974–75 season all goals, whether; conversions, penalties, or drop-goals, scored two points, consequently prior to this date drop-goals were often not explicitly documented. He kicked a remarkable 60 yard drop goal against Hunslet in 1967.

=== County career ===
Terry Crook represented Yorkshire in 1977. Yorkshire played Lancashire at Castleford on 1 March 1977 when Crook played in the centre. Yorkshire won 18–13.

== Coaching career ==
When Terry re-signed for Wakefield Trinity in 1979 he joined the coaching set up with responsibility for the Wakefield Trinity Colts team. He then moved to Batley, in 1982, as player-coach from June 1982 to November 1984, this was followed by a move to Dewsbury, in April 1987 to December 1988, before moving back to Wakefield Trinity in 1991 to take up the role of coach to Wakefield Trinity's fledgling Academy team. He also coached Yorkshire's Academy side in 1991–92. He also spent ten years at Stanley Rangers coaching a junior team from Under-9s to Under-17s.
