= Joe Bonnar =

English rugby league footballer

Personal information
- Full name: Joseph Bonnar
- Born: second ¼ 1948 Whitehaven district, England
- Died: 11 February 2017 (aged 68)

Playing information
- Position: Scrum-half
Club
Years	Team	Pld	T	G	FG	P
1966–68	Whitehaven	30
1968–75	Wakefield Trinity	160	35	1	0	107
1975–76	Halifax	5	0	0	0	0
	Total	195	35	1	0	107
Representative
Years	Team	Pld	T	G	FG	P
1967–73	Cumberland	6	1	0	0	3

Joseph "Joe" Bonnar (birth registered second ¼ 1948 – 11 February 2017) was an English professional rugby league footballer who played in the 1960s and 1970s. He played at representative level for Cumberland, and at club level for Hensingham ARLFC (in Hensingham, Whitehaven), Whitehaven, Wakefield Trinity and Halifax.

== Background ==
Joe Bonnar's birth was registered in Whitehaven district, Cumberland, he worked as coal miner, plumber, and a tiler, he retired from rugby league through injury in 1976, he was a well-known landlord in Dewsbury, he pulled his final pint on 29 January 2007, as he retired after 18 years at the same pub. The former professional rugby league footballer left The George Hotel public house in Moor End Lane in Dewsbury Moor to care for his wife Carol, who had suffered a stroke. Regulars at The George Hotel organised a leaving do for the popular couple, who took on the pub in January 1989, and made it a focal point of the community. Joe, and Carol helped to raise more than £30,000 for various charities over the years, and handed over a cheque for over £2,000 to The Diabetes Appeal at Dewsbury District Hospital before they left The George Hotel. Joe was originally from Cumberland, and he moved to the area when Wakefield Trinity bought him from Whitehaven in 1968 for the princely sum of £3,250 (based on increases in average earnings, this would be approximately £95,380 in 2017). The nippy scrum-half finished his career at Halifax aged 29, and worked as a miner, and a tradesman before settling on the licensed trade. Joe, and Carol moved to Ullswater Road, Dewsbury, close to Hanging Heaton Golf Club, where Joe was a member, he died aged 68.

== Playing career ==
=== Club Championship semi-Final appearances ===
Joe Bonnar played in Wakefield Trinity's 7–12 defeat by Warrington in the Club Championship semi-final during the 1973–74 season.

=== County Cup Final appearances ===
Joe Bonnar played scrum-half in Wakefield Trinity's 2–7 defeat by Leeds in the 1973 Yorkshire Cup Final during the 1973–74 season at Headingley, Leeds on Saturday 20 October 1973, and played scrum-half in the 13–16 defeat by Hull Kingston Rovers in the 1974 Yorkshire Cup Final during the 1974–75 season at Headingley, Leeds on Saturday 26 October 1974.

=== Club career ===
Joe Bonnar made his début for Wakefield Trinity playing scrum-half in the 20–8 victory over Hull F.C. at The Boulevard, Kingston upon Hull on Saturday 20 January 1968, an ankle injury ruled him out of the 17–10 victory over Hull Kingston Rovers in the Championship Final during the 1967–68 season at Headingley, Leeds on Saturday 4 May 1968, and the 10–11 defeat by Leeds in the 1968 "Watersplash" Challenge Cup Final during the 1967–68 season at Wembley Stadium, London on Saturday 11 May 1968, he played his last match for Wakefield Trinity in the 7–35 defeat by Castleford in the last match of the 1974–75 season.
