= 1974–75 Yorkshire Cup =

- Structure: Regional knockout championship
- Teams: 16
- Winners: Hull Kingston Rovers
- Runners-up: Wakefield Trinity

The 1974–75 Yorkshire Cup was the 67th occasion on which the Yorkshire Cup competition had been held.

Hull Kingston Rovers won the trophy by beating Wakefield Trinity by the score of 16–13

The match was played at Headingley, Leeds, now in West Yorkshire. The attendance was 5,823 and receipts were £3,090

It was also the second consecutive Yorkshire Cup final appearances by Wakefield Trinity, both of which would result in defeat

== Background ==
This season there were no junior/amateur clubs taking part, no new entrants and no "leavers" and so the total of entries remained the same at sixteen.

This in turn resulted in no byes in the first round.

== Competition and results ==
=== Round 1 ===
Involved 8 matches (with no byes) and 16 clubs

Game No	Fixture date	Home team	Score	Away team	Venue	Att	Rec	Notes	Ref
1	Fri 30 Aug 1974	Castleford	13–19	York	Wheldon Road	1778			
2	Fri 30 Aug 1974	Hull Kingston Rovers	16–0	Batley	Craven Park (1)	3151			
3	Sat 31 Aug 1974	Leeds	16–5	Keighley	Headingley	3410			
4	Sun 1 Sep 1974	Bradford Northern	49–5	Huddersfield	Odsal	4003			
5	Sun 1 Sep 1974	Bramley	52–17	Doncaster	McLaren Field	800			
6	Sun 1 Sep 1974	Dewsbury	12–15	Featherstone Rovers	Crown Flatt	3320			
7	Sun 1 Sep 1974	New Hunslet	14–17	Hull F.C.	Elland Road Greyhound Stadium	2000		(Note: The first Yorkshire Cup match played at this Elland Road Greyhound Stadium)	
8	Sun 1 Sep 1974	Wakefield Trinity	22-12	Halifax	Belle Vue	2500			

=== Round 2 - Quarter-finals ===
Involved 4 matches and 8 clubs

Game No	Fixture date	Home team	Score	Away team	Venue	Att	Rec	Notes	Ref
1	Wed 4 Sep 1974	Hull Kingston Rovers	23–10	Bramley	Craven Park (1)	3086		(Note: The score is given incorrectly as 0-10 by the John Player yearbook 1975–76 but as 23-10 by the RUGBYLEAGUEproject and others)	
2	Tue 10 Sep 1974	Hull F.C.	12–8	Leeds	Boulevard	4000		(Note: The date is given as Wednesday 11 September by RUGBYLEAGUEproject but by the official Hull archives as Tuesday 10 September.)	
3	Thu 12 Sep 1974	Wakefield Trinity	24–14	Featherstone Rovers	Belle Vue	3300			
4	Thu 19 Sep 1974	York	4–26	Bradford Northern	Clarence Street	2576			

=== Round 3 – Semi-finals ===
Involved 2 matches and 4 clubs

Game No	Fixture date	Home team	Score	Away team	Venue	Att	Rec	Notes	Ref
1	Tue 24 Sep 1974	Bradford Northern	16–16	Hull Kingston Rovers	Odsal	2942			
2	Tue 1 Oct 1974	Hull F.C.	6–8	Wakefield Trinity	Boulevard	4250			

=== Semi-final - replays ===
Involved 1 match and 2 clubs

Game No	Fixture date	Home team	Score	Away team	Venue	Att	Rec	Notes	Ref
R	Wed 2 Oct 1974	Hull Kingston Rovers	5–3	Bradford Northern	Craven Park (1)	4047			

=== Final ===
Game No	Fixture date	Home team	Score	Away team	Venue	Att	Rec	Notes	Ref
	Saturday 26 October 1974	Hull Kingston Rovers	16–13	Wakefield Trinity	Headingley	5,823	£3,090	(Note: Headingley, Leeds, is the home ground of Leeds RLFC with a capacity of 21,000. The record attendance was 40,175 for a league match between Leeds and Bradford Northern on 21 May 1947.)	

==== Teams and scorers ====
Hull Kingston Rovers	No.	Wakefield Trinity
	teams	
Robert Smithies	1	Les Sheard
Clive Sullivan	2	David Smith
Bernard Watson	3	Terry "TC" Crook
Phillip "Phil" Coupland	4	John Hegarty
George Kirkpatrick	5	John Archer
Roger Millward (c)	6	David Topliss
Mike Stephenson	7	Joseph "Joe" Bonnar
John Millington	8	George Ballantyne
Dave Heslop	9	Raymond Handscombe
Paul Rose	10	Roy Bratt
Cliff Wallis	11	Trevor Skerrett
Neil Fox	12	Alan Tonks
Joseph "Joe" Brown	13	Mick Morgan (c)
Gerald "Ged" Dunn (for Clive Sullivan)	14	Neil Goodwin (for Alan Tonks)
Ian Madley (for Neil Fox)	15	Ernest Holmes (for Neil Goodwin)
??	Coach	Peter Fox
16	score	13
5	HT	7
	Scorers	
	Tries	
Gerald "Ged" Dunn (1)	T	David Smith (1)
Bernard Watson (2)	T	John Hegarty (1)
George Kirkpatrick (1)	T	Roy Bratt (1)
	Goals	
Neil Fox (2)	G	Terry "TC" Crook (2)
Referee		Michael "Mick" J. Naughton (Widnes)
White Rose Trophy for Man of the match		Roger Millward - Hull KR - stand-off
sponsored by		
Competition Sponsor		Esso

Scoring - Try = three points - Goal = two points - Drop goal = one point

=== The road to success ===
First round
Castleford	13
York	19
Bradford Northern	49
Huddersfield	5
Hull Kingston Rovers	16
Batley	0
Bramley	52
Doncaster	17
New Hunslet	14
Hull F.C.	17
Leeds	16
Keighley	5
Wakefield Trinity	22
Halifax	12
Dewsbury	12
Featherstone Rovers	15

Second round
York	4
Bradford Northern	26
Hull Kingston Rovers	23
Bramley	10
Hull F.C.	12
Leeds	8
Wakefield Trinity	24
Featherstone Rovers	14

Semi-finals
Bradford Northern	16 (3)
Hull Kingston Rovers	16 (5)
Hull F.C.	6
Wakefield Trinity	8

Final
Hull Kingston Rovers	16
Wakefield Trinity	13

== See also ==
- 1974–75 Northern Rugby Football League season
- Rugby league county cups
