= Leigh Genesis F.C. =

English amateur football club

Leigh Genesis
- Full name: Leigh Genesis Football Club
- Nickname: The Leythers
- Founded: 1896 (as Horwich RMI)
- League: Manchester Football League Division Two
- 2023–24: Manchester Football League Division Two, 10th
Home colours	Away colours

Leigh Genesis Football Club, formerly known as Horwich RMI (Railway Mechanics Institute) and Leigh RMI, is an English amateur association football club that currently plays in the South Lancashire Counties Football League. The semi-professional senior side folded in 2011, following relegation from the Northern Premier League; however, the club continued, fielding youth teams in the North West Youth Alliance, and a women's team in the North West Women's Regional League. The senior team was reintroduced for the 2012–13 season in the South Lancashire Sunday League.

The club has been based in Leigh, Greater Manchester, and played at Grundy Hill, Hilton Park, Leigh Sports Village, and finally Crilly Park. The highest level at which the club has this far competed is the Conference National, between 2000 and 2005; it reached the FA Cup first round proper on five occasions between 1928 and 2004.

== History ==
The club was founded in 1896 and was initially known as Horwich RMI F.C., the club's name until 1995 when it relocated to Leigh and was renamed Leigh RMI. Its name was changed again in June 2008 when the club became Leigh Genesis FC.

=== Founding and early years ===
RMI was one of two football clubs founded at the workshops of the Lancashire and Yorkshire Railway; it was started at the locomotive works in Horwich. The other club was started at the Newton Heath carriage and wagon works and later became known, and famous, as Manchester United. RMI played in various non-professional leagues over its first 90 years of existence, primarily in the Lancashire Combination, before moving into the newly formed North West Counties League in 1982, and then onto the Northern Premier League the next year.

Postcard of Grundy Hill, RMI's ground in Horwich

Manager Les Rigby led RMI to the final of the GMAC Cup in 1988 against Weymouth, which was played on the sloping pitch of Grundy Hill. The home advantage was credited by many, including Rigby, for spurring RMI's victory in the match.

=== Move to Leigh ===
During the 1994–95 season, the club realised their ground Grundy Hill would not be able to help the clubs' prospects of achieving success up the football pyramid, made the decision to move from Horwich seven miles south to Hilton Park in Leigh, home of the rugby league club Leigh Centurions. As part of this deal, a new company, Grundy Hill Estates, was formed to take over the ownership of the shared ground. Once the move had been finalised and agreements had been made to share the 10,000 capacity stadium, the club officially changed their name to Leigh RMI to reflect their new surroundings. RMI lost its first match at Hilton Park in March 1995 to Boston United 4–0, and were relegated at the end of the 1995 season.

In 2000, five years after this move, Leigh RMI reached the top tier of the Conference, the highest level of non-league football in England. Upon entering the Conference, RMI had a very successful first season, finishing a very respectable fifth place. Steve Jones spearheaded the club's attack that season, scoring 19 league goals. After a few seasons at this level, and despite the fact that things seemed to be going well for the club on the pitch, Leigh RMI faced a placement in the new Conference North division for 2004–05 due to their second from the bottom finish in the 2003–04 season. The club was spared relegation that season due to two factors: the lack of a promotable Northern Premier League club kept the team that finished above them in the table from relegation and Margate were demoted from the Conference for failing to meet ground standards. Leigh RMI's reprieve only lasted one season, however, as they were relegated after finishing bottom of the Conference table in 2004–05 with only 18 points from 42 games.

The season after this relegation, Leigh RMI hosted F.C. United of Manchester, the football club started in reaction to the purchase of Manchester United by American businessman Malcolm Glazer, for FCUM's first ever match in July 2005, a friendly that ended in 0–0 draw. Leigh RMI's ownership had previously offered to merge with FCUM prior to this friendly in 2005, but the clubs decided against such a merger. "It would seem hypocritical to some degree, in light of the Glazer events, if a team came into being by taking over another club," said Chairman of RMI Supporters' Club Peter Lowe at the time.

The 2005–06 season saw the club finish second from bottom in the Conference North, and the club thereby faced relegation to the Northern Premier League, but RMI gained yet another reprieve from relegation after Canvey Island resigned from the Conference National. In the 2006–07 campaign, RMI avoided relegation more easily, despite finishing 17th and in the bottom half of Conference North. As of 6 October 2007, Leigh RMI were again facing a relegation fight as they stood on the threshold of the relegation zone in 19th place. RMI removed manager Stuart Humphreys and his assistant Andy Roscoe on 15 October 2007 and hired Steve Bleasdale to manage due to "the fact of the current low league position and falling gates something had to be done rapidly to improve our prospects," according to a club spokesman.

=== Genesis ===
In May 2008 Leigh RMI lost their fight for survival and were relegated to the Northern Premier League. In June 2008 the club was renamed Leigh Genesis to signify a "new beginning" for the club ahead of its move to the Leigh Sports Village. The rebranding was also used to signify chairman Dominic Speakman's restructuring of the ailing club with the view of taking the club forward.

In October 2008, chairman Dominic Speakman announced his departure from the club. Genesis had been due to move into the new Leigh Sports Village Stadium (LSV). Continuing delays and unrealistic pricing, in the end cost the club. With the rising losses, and lack of home ground Speakman withdrew his financial backing from the club.

A large number of the playing staff agreed to play voluntarily. The board and backroom staff also offered to stay unpaid for the immediate future. However, manager Steve Bleasdale resigned the following week, and shortly afterwards returned to former club Chester City as assistant manager. Reserve team coach Lee Merricks was appointed the club's new manager.

The LGSA (Leigh Genesis Supporters Association), began fundraising and hoped to keep the club alive.

On 23 March 2009 the club appointed former Blackburn player Garry Flitcroft as its new manager, as well as announcing that the team would be playing at the Leigh Sports Village with immediate effect.

After finishing in sixth position, one place outside of the promotion play-offs, in the Northern Premier League Division One North during 2009–10, manager Garry Flitcroft and several players departed the club to join local rivals Chorley.

The club left the Leigh Sports Village Stadium and entered into a groundshare agreement at Crilly Park with North West Counties Premier Division neighbours Atherton Laburnum Rovers for the 2010–11 season. At the same time, they appointed former player Mark Maddox, previously manager with Formby, as their new manager, bringing eight players from the Formby squad with him. In June 2010, veteran midfielder Andy Heald was installed as player-coach, while July 2010 saw Gary Scott, another ex-Leigh player and former Altrincham teammate of Maddox's, appointed as assistant manager and Richard Ward as a coaching assistant.

Maddox and Leigh parted company by mutual consent on 3 December 2010, with Maddox replaced as manager by Alan Kershaw, who stepped up from managing the successful Leigh Genesis Youth side in the Lancashire Floodlit League.

On 2 June 2011, Leigh Genesis FC officially announced that it would not be joining the North West Counties League (Level 9) despite being relegated from the Northern Premier League Division One North (Level 8). Leigh Genesis secretary Mary Croasdale stated:

... we do not have a home ground and have been ground sharing for the last year at Crilly Park, home of Atherton LR. It is with much sadness and regret that we confirm that due to our lack of permanent facility we will not be applying for membership with the North West Counties League and taking an option further down the football ladder as appropriate for the playing facility we will have available.

=== Present day club ===
Despite the demise of the semi-professional senior side, it was not the end for Leigh Genesis as they continued to field various youth teams in the North West Youth Alliance and the Bolton & Bury Junior League as well as a women's team in the North West Women's Regional League.

In May 2012, the club officially announced the re-launch of the senior team for the 2012–13 season. was playing in the South Lancashire Counties Football League, a men's Sunday League affiliated with the Lancashire FA.

Saturday football finally returned in 2019 when local side Leigh Athletic became part of the Genesis club, retaining their two sides long running membership of the Manchester Football League. Ironically, here they faced Horwich RMI - an amateur club formed in 1996 by those opposed to the relocation.

== Colours and badge ==
The club introduced new colours to their kit for the 2008–09 season. The home kit consisted of white shirts with black trim, black shorts and black socks, while the away kit was all blue with white trim. Both kits were manufactured by Nike and neither had a sponsor, instead bearing the new Genesis name. The kit colours were changed as part of the "Genesis" branding and to stand out from the many clubs in Lancashire with red kits. Prior to the rebranding Leigh RMI playing kits consisted of red and white striped shirts, black shorts and red socks. The emblem for the club was the Leigh coat of arms.

It was said that the club had desired the colour of their home kit to be primarily black. However FA rules prevented non-league clubs to do so due to comparisons with the colours worn during a match by the match officials.

== Supporters ==
Match programme from 1994

After moving from Grundy Hill in Horwich, this club's support has always been considered light.

Horwich's traumatic move to Leigh involved a far greater leap than a mere six-mile journey south west. Unsigned boundaries were crossed. Horwich is football and Bolton Wanderers; Leigh is rugby league.

With Leigh being known as a rugby league town, and the numerous well known football sides on the club's doorstep, not only Wigan Athletic, but Blackburn Rovers, Manchester City, and Manchester United, Leigh RMI averaged attendances of approximately 250 people per game in 2007.

== FA Cup record ==
As Horwich RMI, the club only made the FA Cup First Round proper twice. In the 1928–29 season, RMI lost to Scarborough at home 1–2, and 54 years later, in 1982, they lost at Blackpool 3–0.

After relocating to Leigh, the club reached the FA Cup First Round on three occasions. The first came in the 1998–99 season when RMI defeated Winsford, Worksop, and Droylsden, the last two by the same scoreline, 2–1, to meet Fulham, then in Division Two, at Craven Cottage. Leigh achieved a 1–1 draw against Fulham in the club's first FA Cup first round appearance in 16 years, and received attention of the British media. Leigh goalkeeper David Felgate, who was then 38 years old, received widespread plaudits for his sparkling performance in the Fulham match, which prompted then-Fulham boss Kevin Keegan to declare that Felgate's goalkeeping was "the best I've ever seen at any level."

The RMI-Fulham replay at Hilton Park, which was televised and shown live on Sky Sports, ended with Leigh losing 0–2. RMI's Cup defeat witnessed by a club record crowd of 7,125 spectators.

Leigh's second FA Cup first round appearance in the 2000–01 season also ended in defeat. They lost 3–0 to Millwall who at that time were in Division Two. On police advice, the venue for this match was switched from Hilton Park to The New Den in Bermondsey, Millwall's home ground.

A third appearance in the FA Cup first round proper also ended in defeat for Leigh with a 2–1 defeat away to Conference South side Cambridge City in the 2004–05 season. This followed RMI's 2–0 victory at Accrington Stanley in the Fourth Qualifying Round that year.

== Stadia ==
- The Old Racecourse 1896–1914
- Grundy Hill 1914–1995 (as Horwich RMI)
- Hilton Park 1995–2008
- Leigh Sports Village 2009–10
- Crilly Park 2010–11

== Managers ==
- Steve Waywell (1995–2003)
- Mark Patterson (2003)
- Phil Starbuck (2003–04)
- Geoff Lutley (2004–05)
- Steve Bleasdale (2005)
- Stuart Humphreys (2005–2007)
- Steve Bleasdale (2007–08)
- Lee Merricks (2008–09)
- Garry Flitcroft (2009–10)
- Mark Maddox (2010)
- Alan Kershaw (2010–11)
- Liam Conor (2011–16)
- Rob Atherton (2016-)

== Honours ==
League

- West Lancashire League
  - Champions: 1910–11, 1911–12
- Lancashire Combination
  - Champions: 1957–58
- Lancashire Combination
  - Runners-up: 1928–29 (on goal average), 1929–30, 1955–56, 1966–67
- Lancashire Combination Division Two
  - Runners-up: 1948–49, 1950–51
- Cheshire County League
  - Champions: 1978–79
- Northern Premier League Division One
  - Runner-up: 1996–97
- Northern Premier League Premier Division
  - Champions: 1999–2000

Cup

- Conference League Cup
  - Winners: 1987–88
- Peter Swales Challenge Shield
  - Winners: 1999–2000
- Lancashire FA Challenge Trophy
  - Winners: 2002–03

=== Club records ===
- Record win: 19–1 vs Nelson, 1964 (Lancashire Combination)
- Record defeat: 1–9 vs Brandon United, (FA Cup)
- Record home crowd at Grundy Hill, Horwich: 8,500 vs Wigan Athletic, 1954
- Record home crowd at Hilton Park, Leigh: 7,125 vs Fulham, 1998 (FA Cup)
- Best league finish: Football Conference, 5th position 2000–01

== Notable former players ==
See also Category:Leigh Genesis F.C. players
