= Barry Parker =

English rugby league footballer

Personal information
- Full name: Barry Parker

Playing information
- Position: Wing
Club
Years	Team	Pld	T	G	FG	P
Aug 1973–73/74	Wakefield Trinity	14	6	0	0	18

Barry Parker is a former professional rugby league footballer who played in the 1970s. He played at club level for Wakefield Trinity, as a wing.

== Playing career ==
=== County Cup Final appearances ===
Barry Parker played on the wing in Wakefield Trinity's 2-7 defeat by Leeds in the 1973 Yorkshire Cup Final during the 1973–74 season at Headingley, Leeds on Saturday 20 October 1973.
