= 1971–72 Yorkshire Cup =

- Structure: Regional knockout championship
- Teams: 16
- Winners: Hull Kingston Rovers
- Runners-up: Castleford

The 1971–72 Yorkshire Cup was the sixty-fourth occasion on which the Yorkshire Cup competition had been held.

Hull Kingston Rovers won the trophy by beating Castleford by the score of 11–7. The match was played at Belle Vue, in the City of Wakefield, now in West Yorkshire. The attendance was 5,536 and receipts were £1,589. The attendance was a Yorkshire Cup final record, the lowest ever, a record which would never be beaten. This is the second time in four seasons that Castleford, (who have never won the trophy, to date) finished as runner-up.

== Background ==
Due to the introduction of a new knock-out competition (the Player's No.6 Trophy), and the New Zealand national team's upcoming tour of Great Britain, the Yorkshire County Committee decided to stage the county cup much earlier than previous seasons, with the first round taking place at the end of July. Leeds objected to the decision, and withdrew from the competition due to Headingley Stadium being used for cricket during the summer.

== Competition and results ==
=== First Round ===
The committee refused to accept Leeds' withdrawal from the competition, and included them in the draw for the first round. Leeds re-affirmed their decision not to take part in the competition, and Bramley were consequently awarded a walkover. Hull Kingston Rovers were also given a walkover after Dewsbury were forced to withdraw due a pay dispute with their players.

Game No	Fixture date	Home team	Score	Away team	Venue	Att	Ref
1	Sat 31 Jul 1971	Castleford	24–5	Batley	Wheldon Road		
2	Sat 31 Jul 1971	Hull F.C.	9–2	Featherstone Rovers	Boulevard		
3	Sun 1 Aug 1971	Doncaster	12–4	Bradford Northern	Tattersfield		
4	Sun 1 Aug 1971	Halifax	19–10	York	Thrum Hall		
5	Sun 1 Aug 1971	Hunslet	10–17	Keighley	Parkside		
6	Sun 1 Aug 1971	Wakefield Trinity	11–4	Huddersfield	Belle Vue		
7		Bramley	w/o	Leeds			
8		Hull Kingston Rovers	w/o	Dewsbury			

=== Second Round ===
Involved 4 matches and 8 clubs

Game No	Fixture date	Home team	Score	Away team	Venue	Att	Ref
1	Fri 6 Aug 1971	Castleford	13–10	Wakefield Trinity	Wheldon Road		
2	Fri 6 Aug 1971	Keighley	16–12	Hull F.C.	Lawkholme Lane		
3	Sun 8 Aug 1971	Bramley	18–12	Halifax	McLaren Field		
4	Sun 8 Aug 1971	Doncaster	14–24	Hull Kingston Rovers	Tattersfield		

=== Semi-finals ===
Involved 2 matches and 4 clubs

Game No	Fixture date	Home team	Score	Away team	Venue	Att	Ref
1	Fri 13 Aug 1971	Castleford	12–7	Keighley	Wheldon Road		
2	Sun 15 Aug 1971	Hull Kingston Rovers	25–6	Bramley	Craven Park (1)		

=== Final ===
Game No	Fixture date	Home team	Score	Away team	Venue	Att	Rec	Ref
	Saturday 21 August 1971	Hull Kingston Rovers	11–7	Castleford	Belle Vue	5,536	£1,589	

==== Teams and scorers ====
Hull Kingston Rovers	No.	Castleford
	Teams	
Ian Markham	1	Derek Edwards
Mike Stephenson	2	Derek Foster
Phil lip "Phil" Coupland	3	Steve 'Knocker' Norton
George Kirkpatrick	4	Keith Worsley
Paul Longstaff	5	Alan Lowndes
Roger Millward (c)	6	Danny Hargrave
Paul Daley	7	Gary Stephens
Steve Wiley	8	Dennis Hartley
Peter Flanagan	9	Tony Miller
John Millington	10	Ian Van Bellen
Cliff Wallis	11	Brian Lockwood
Eric Palmer	12	Alan Dickinson
Joe Brown	13	Graham Blakeway
	Subs	
John Moore	14	Glyn Jones
Colin Cooper (for Eric Palmer)	15	Alan Ackroyd (for Ian Van Bellen)
Johnny Whiteley	Coach	Harry Poole
11	score	7
7	HT	3
	Scorers	
	Tries	
Paul Longstaff (1)	T	Derek Foster (1)
	Goals	
Roger Millward (4)	G	Alan Ackroyd (2)
Referee		Alexander Givvons, Jr. (Oldham)
White Rose Trophy for Man of the match		Ian Markham - Hull KR - Fullback
Sponsored by		

=== The road to success ===
First round
Doncaster	12
Bradford Northern	4
Hull Kingston Rovers
??
Bramley
??
Halifax	19
York	10
Castleford	24
Batley	5
Wakefield Trinity	11
Huddersfield	4
Hunslet	10
Keighley	17
Hull F.C.	9
Featherstone Rovers	2

Second round
Doncaster	14
Hull Kingston Rovers	24
Bramley	18
Halifax	12
Castleford	13
Wakefield Trinity	10
Keighley	16
Hull F.C.	12

Semi-finals
Hull Kingston Rovers	25
Bramley	6
Castleford	12
Keighley	7

Final
Hull Kingston Rovers	11
Castleford	7

== See also ==
- 1971–72 Northern Rugby Football League season
- Rugby league county cups
