= 1977–78 Northern Rugby Football League season =

- League: Northern Rugby Football League
- Champions: Widnes
- Premiership: Bradford
- Man of Steel Award: George Nicholls
- Top point-scorer(s): Geoff Pimblett (381)
- Top try-scorer(s): Stuart Wright (33)

Promotion and relegation
- Promoted from Second Division: Leigh; Barrow; Rochdale Hornets; Huddersfield
- Relegated to Second Division: Hull; New Hunslet; Bramley; Dewsbury

The 1977–78 Northern Rugby Football League season was the 83rd season of rugby league football. Sixteen English clubs competed for the Northern Rugby Football League Championship with Widnes claiming the title by finishing the season on top of the League.

== Season summary ==
In June 1977, the International Rugby League Board imposed a four-year ban on international transfers. The ban was primarily put in place as a response to the growing number of English players being recruited by Australian clubs.

The League champions were Widnes for the first time. Bradford Northern's last game was cancelled as Featherstone Rovers were on strike, consequently Bradford Northern finished 2nd on percentages.

Hull FC, New Hunslet, Bramley and Dewsbury were demoted to the Second Division.

Leeds were 14-12 Challenge Cup Winners over St. Helens.

2nd Division Champions were Leigh, and they, Barrow, Rochdale Hornets and Huddersfield were promoted to the First Division.

== League Tables ==
=== First Division Championship ===
	Team	Pld	W	D	L	PF	PA	Pts
1	Widnes	30	24	2	4	613	241	50
2	Bradford Northern	29	21	2	6	500	291	44
3	St. Helens	30	22	1	7	678	384	45
4	Hull Kingston Rovers	30	16	3	11	495	419	35
5	Wigan	30	17	1	12	482	435	35
6	Salford	30	16	0	14	470	446	32
7	Featherstone Rovers	29	15	2	12	443	452	32
8	Leeds	30	15	1	14	512	460	31
9	Warrington	30	15	0	15	561	367	30
10	Castleford	30	13	2	15	515	583	28
11	Workington Town	30	11	4	15	406	519	26
12	Wakefield Trinity	30	12	1	17	393	450	25
13	Hull	30	10	3	17	358	480	23
14	New Hunslet	30	11	0	19	318	518	22
15	Bramley	30	5	4	21	281	608	14
16	Dewsbury	30	2	2	26	207	589	6

=== Second Division Championship ===
	Team	Pld	W	D	L	PF	PA	Pts
1	Leigh	26	21	0	5	538	231	42
2	Barrow	26	21	0	5	521	234	42
3	Rochdale Hornets	26	21	0	5	437	200	42
4	Huddersfield	26	18	0	8	502	324	36
5	York	26	16	2	8	447	286	34
6	Oldham	26	17	0	9	419	325	34
7	Keighley	26	11	3	12	357	337	25
8	Swinton	26	11	1	14	369	385	23
9	Whitehaven	26	10	2	14	277	326	22
10	Huyton	26	9	2	15	250	352	20
11	Doncaster	26	9	0	17	304	528	18
12	Batley	26	5	1	20	233	496	11
13	Blackpool Borough	26	5	1	20	262	543	11
14	Halifax	26	2	0	24	182	531	4

Champions	Play-offs	Promoted	Relegated

== Cups ==
=== Challenge Cup ===
Leeds beat St Helens 14-12 in the final played at Wembley Stadium on Saturday 13 May 1978 before a crowd of 96,000.

This was Leeds’ eleventh Cup Final win in fifteen appearances and their second in successive years.

=== Player's No.6 Trophy ===
The Player's No.6 Trophy winners were Warrington beating Widnes 9-4 in the final.

=== Premiership ===
Rugby League Premiership Trophy Winners were Bradford Northern beating Widnes 17-8 in the final.

=== County cups ===
Workington Town (from Cumbria) beat Wigan 16–13 to win the Lancashire County Cup, and Castleford beat Featherstone Rovers 17–7 to win the Yorkshire County Cup.

=== BBC2 Floodlit Trophy ===
BBC2 Floodlit Trophy Winners were Hull Kingston Rovers beating St. Helens 26-11 in the final.

== Statistics ==
The following are the top points scorers in the 1977–78 season.

Most tries

Player	Team	Tries
Stuart Wright	Widnes	33
Keith Fielding	Salford	31
Eddie Cunningham	St. Helens	30
John Bevan	Warrington	30
Steve Fenton	Castleford	30
Green Vigo	Wigan	29
Peter Glynn	St. Helens	28
David Smith	Leeds	28
Terry Morgan	York	27
Bruce Burton	Castleford	27

Most goals (including drop goals)

Player	Team	Goals
Geoff Pimblett	St. Helens	178
Steve Hesford	Warrington	158
John Woods	Leigh	149
Iain McCorquodale	Workington Town	138
Paul Woods	Widnes	122
David Watkins	Salford	110
Keith Mumby	Bradford Northern	107
Sammy Lloyd	Castleford	104
Neil Fox	Bradford Northern	95
Willie Oulton	Leeds	80

== Sources ==
- 1977–78 Rugby Football League season at wigan.rlfans.com
- The Challenge Cup at The Rugby Football League website
