= Hilton Park (stadium) =

Former rugby stadium in Leigh, Greater Manchester, England

- The Coliseum
- Interactive map of Hilton Park
- Full name: Hilton Park
- Former names: Kirkhall Lane
- Location: Leigh, Metropolitan Borough of Wigan
- Coordinates: 53°30′9″N 2°31′21″W
- Capacity: 10,000
- Surface: Grass

Construction
- Built: 1947
- Opened: 1947
- Closed: 2009
- Demolished: 2009

Tenants
- Leigh RLFC (1947–2009); Leigh Genesis (1995–2009)

Hilton Park was a multi-purpose stadium in Leigh, Greater Manchester, England. It was the home of Leigh RLFC rugby league club and Leigh Genesis football club. It had a capacity of approximately 10,000.

The stadium was demolished in February 2009.

== History ==
In 1947, Leigh Rugby League Club moved to new headquarters in Kirkhall Lane, having played at Mather Lane before the Second World War and at Madeley Park (Leigh Harriers Athletic ground) immediately after the war.

In 1953, floodlights were installed at a cost of £4,100. The ground saw a record home crowd of 31,326 attend a Rugby League Challenge Cup tie with St. Helens in the same year. Later, Kirkhall Lane was officially renamed Hilton Park after former club chairman Jack Hilton in recognition of his work in securing the site for the new ground.

Leigh's record attendance for rugby was set in 1953 at 31,326 when St Helens visited for a third round Challenge Cup game. The largest modern-day attendance saw 9,760 watch a Challenge Cup Quarter Final against local rivals Wigan in 2002.

In 1995, the association football club Horwich RMI moved from the Grundy Hill stadium, in Horwich to Hilton Park, changing its name to Leigh RMI in the process. As part of the deal a new company, Grundy Hill Estates, was formed to take over the ownership of the ground.

Leigh added Centurions to its name for the 1995–96 season, and as part of the name change the stadium was renamed the Coliseum.

Leigh moved to Leigh Sports Village for the 2009–10 season. Hilton Park has since been demolished with a housing development being built on the site.

== Rugby League Test Matches ==
The list of international rugby league matches played at Hilton Park is.

Game#	Date	Result	Attendance	Notes
1	19 November 1954*	Australia def. New Zealand 18–5	6,000	
2	19 September 1955	Other Nationalities def. France 32–19	7,000	1955–56 European Rugby League Championship
3	18 March 1964	Great Britain def. France 39–0	4,750	

* This match, played a week after the 1954 Rugby League World Cup Final, was played in very muddy conditions and saw both teams come out in different coloured jumpers after half time. Australia wore red and New Zealand wore blue.

== Rugby League Tour Matches ==
Hilton Park also saw Leigh and an English League XIII select side play host to international touring teams from Australia and New Zealand from 1948 to 1982.

game	Date	Result	Attendance	Notes
1	29 September 1948	Australia def. Leigh 24–12	12,968	1948–49 Kangaroo tour
2	15 October 1952	Australia def. Leigh 34–5	8,409	1952–53 Kangaroo tour
3	29 October 1956	Australia def. English League XIII 19–15	7,811	1956–57 Kangaroo tour
4	7 October 1959	Leigh def. Australia 18–17	11,932	1959–60 Kangaroo tour
5	6 October 1963	Australia def. Leigh 33–7	9,625	1963–64 Kangaroo tour
6	11 November 1973	Australia def. Leigh 31–4	2,607	1973 Kangaroo tour
7	11 November 1980	New Zealand def. Leigh 22–5	3,166	1980 New Zealand Kiwis tour
8	3 November 1982	Australia def. Leigh 44–4	7,680	1982 Kangaroo tour
