= List of Salford RLFC players =

The following is a list of rugby league players who have made 100 or more appearances for Salford RLFC since they joined the Northern Union in 1896. Appearances include all official league and cup games, but exclude friendlies. The list is ordered by surname, and then by first name.

== Players ==
Heritage #	Name	Debut season	Appearances	Tries	Goals	DGs	Points	Representative
1056	Luke Adamson	2006	145	20	1	0	82	—
481	Frank Alder	1949–50	150	14	0	—	42	—
946	Malcolm Alker	1997	360	75	0	1	301	England
460	George Aspinall	1946–47	173	79	0	—	237	—
1226	Chris Atkin	2020	102	17	4	1	77	—
503	Albert Baines	1952–53	113	48	0	—	144	—
964	Neil Baynes	1999	144	14	0	0	56	—
665	Peter Banner	1968–69	180	24	1	0	74	Wales
792	Keith Bentley	1983–84	101	28	0	1	113	—
549	Les Bettinson	1956–57	319	75	10	—	245	—
868	Martin Birkett	1989–90	126	33	122	0	376	—
901	Steve Blakeley	1992–93	247	72	702	8	1700	England
809	Ian Blease	1984–85	252	49	0	0	96	—
790	Darren Bloor	1983–84	143	46	0	4	188	—
496	Frank Boardman	1951–52	167	1	0	—	3	—
649	Charlie Bott	1967–68	160	12	1	—	38	—
291	Sid Boyd	1923–24	299	56	0	—	168	—
358	Joe Bradbury	1929–30	299	15	0	—	45	—
570	Jack Brennan	1959–60	329	70	3	—	216	—
943	Gary Broadbent	1997	137	25	0	0	100	—
371	Bob Brown	1931–32	251	136	0	—	408	—
426	Jack Brown	1945–46	218	21	12	—	87	—
24	William Brown	Prior to 1896	277	13	29	—	97	—
112	Arthur Buckler	1904–05	189	15	0	—	45	Wales
73	Herbert Buckler	1900–01	155	12	3	—	42	—
647	Bob Burdell	1966–67	115	6	1	—	20	—
833	Andy Burgess	1986–87	175	28	2	0	116	Ireland
220	James Burgess	1918–19	218	47	90	—	321	—
712	John Butler	1974–75	135	50	0	0	150	—
273	Frank Butterworth	1921–22	110	2	0	—	6	—
765	Ged Byrne	1981–82	169	84	0	0	311	—
196	George Callender	1911–12	114	35	1	—	107	—
348	Aubrey Casewell	1928–29	187	63	0	—	189	Wales
1023	Chris Charles	2003	112	16	231	0	526	England
673	Paul Charlton	1969–70	234	99	2	0	301	Great Britain
533	John Cheshire	1955–56	255	43	141	—	411	Wales
203	Walter Clegg	1913–14	268	14	0	—	42	—
992	Andy Coley	2001	191	50	0	0	200	Great Britain
153	Jimmy Cook	1907–08	161	98	4	—	302	—
666	Michael Coulman	1968–69	463	135	1	1	408	Great Britain
524	Harry Council	1954–55	262	20	0	—	60	—
603	Ernie Critchley	1962–63	125	14	0	—	42	—
409	George Curran	1940–41	175	12	1	—	38	Great Britain
176	George Currie	1910–11	193	2	0	—	6	—
157	Ephraim Curzon	1908–09	102	8	0	—	24	Great Britain
361	Paddy Dalton	1930–31	291	58	0	—	174	England
477	Tom Danby	1949–50	174	61	2	—	187	Great Britain
390	Dai Davies	1936–37	370	39	0	—	117	Wales
689	Doug Davies	1971–72	101	6	0	0	18	—
465	Jack Davies	1947–48	241	49	470	—	1087	Wales
365	Bert Day	1931–32	488	6	0	—	18	Wales
401	Eric Day	1939–40	116	7	0	—	21	—
670	Colin Dixon	1968–69	418	91	1	0	275	Great Britain
586	Alan Dorning	1960–61	119	21	0	—	63	—
527	Hugh Duffy	1954–55	240	51	1	—	155	—
919	Cliff Eccles	1994–95	124	13	0	0	52	Ireland
383	Alan Edwards	1935–36	199	129	29	—	445	Great Britain
1129	Niall Evalds	2013	160	110	0	0	440	—
853	Tex Evans	1988–89	144	67	0	0	268	—
357	Jack Feetham	1929–30	415	114	0	—	342	Great Britain
702	Keith Fielding	1973–74	320	253	133	0	1025	Great Britain
491	Bill Finnan	1950–51	118	47	0	—	141	—
5	George Fisher	1896–97	121	1	0	—	3	—
1026	Karl Fitzpatrick	2004	139	49	2	0	200	—
1180	Mark Flanagan	2016	111	9	0	0	36	—
755	Paul Fletcher	1980–81	171	40	40	1	227	—
904	Paul Forber	1992–93	146	33	0	0	132	—
376	Joe Gardner	1933–34	110	1	0	—	3	—
389	Albert Gear	1936–37	148	40	3	—	126	—
837	Steve Gibson	1987–88	133	62	0	0	248	—
682	Ken Gill	1970–71	275	62	9	1	205	Great Britain
787	Peter Glynn	1983–84	144	24	1	6	104	—
311	Jack Gore	1924–25	125	29	0	—	87	Great Britain
707	Gordon Graham	1974–75	114	28	0	0	84	—
488	Jim Grainger	1950–51	176	23	0	—	69	—
545	Arthur Gregory	1956–57	194	28	0	—	84	—
21	Ivor Grey	1896–97	119	9	0	—	27	—
679	Alan Grice	1970–71	245	4	0	0	12	—
1170	George Griffin	2015	114	23	0	0	92	—
22	Ben Griffiths	1896–97	161	14	64	—	174	—
785	Paul Groves	1982–83	102	15	0	0	60	—
1024	Gareth Haggerty	2003	125	18	0	0	72	Ireland
262	Teddy Haines	1921–22	342	56	0	—	168	England
607	Albert Halsall	1962–63	106	11	0	—	33	—
534	John Hancock	1955–56	104	2	15	—	36	—
379	George Harris	1934–35	105	5	0	—	15	—
394	Tommy Harrison	1937–38	359	62	9	—	204	—
7	E. T. Harter	Prior to 1896	100	21	1	—	65	—
483	Bryn Hartley	1950–51	231	89	0	—	267	—
8	George Heath	1896–97	227	20	1	—	62	—
727	Harold Henney	1977–78	153	25	0	0	76	—
814	Steve Herbert	1985–86	133	11	0	0	44	—
650	Chris Hesketh	1967–68	452	128	0	0	384	Great Britain
954	Paul Highton	1998	269	24	0	0	96	Wales
347	Barney Hudson	1927–28	411	282	58	—	962	Great Britain
645	Paul Jackson	1966–67	134	49	3	—	153	—
362	Emlyn Jenkins	1930–31	246	88	44	—	352	Great Britain
1064	Lee Jewitt	2007	125	7	0	0	28	—
127	Dai John	1904–05	412	41	46	—	215	Wales
1145	Greg Johnson	2014	105	50	1	0	202	—
1181	Josh Jones	2016	115	19	0	0	76	—
521	Graham Jones	1954–55	239	119	0	—	357	Wales
495	Brian Keavney	1950–51	169	31	104	—	301	—
399	Joe Kenny	1938–39	141	30	0	—	90	—
860	Steve Kerry	1988–89	100	45	293	12	778	—
691	John Knighton	1971–72	182	31	0	0	93	—
1169	Ryan Lannon	2015	104	11	0	0	44	—
186	Harry Launce	1911–12	176	2	15	—	36	—
868	Mark Lee	1989–90	244	31	0	29	153	—
107	Ike Lewis	1903–04	118	7	0	—	21	—
957	Stuart Littler	1998	329	113	0	0	452	—
84	James Lomas	1901–02	312	210	470	—	1570	Great Britain
189	Arthur Loveluck	1911–12	128	33	2	—	103	—
1184	Robert Lui	2016	109	35	33	0	206	—
914	Nathan McAvoy	1993–94	143	78	0	0	312	England
714	Chris McGreal	1974–75	119	13	3	0	45	—
479	Tom McKinney	1949–50	148	0	4	—	8	Great Britain
778	Mick McTigue	1982–83	181	27	0	0	102	—
697	Graham MacKay	1972–73	114	5	0	0	15	—
749	David Major	1979–89	221	10	0	0	39	—
507	Peter Marston	1952–53	108	6	0	—	18	—
925	Scott Martin	1994–95	105	32	0	0	128	—
171	Edgar May	1910–11	138	34	2	—	106	—
318	Reg Meek	1925–26	260	32	25	—	146	—
159	Bernard Mesley	1908–09	213	86	171	—	600	—
352	Alf Middleton	1928–29	285	67	25	—	251	Great Britain
355	Sammy Miller	1929–30	312	81	57	—	357	—
437	Dai Moses	1945–46	328	29	4	—	95	—
241	Jack Muir	1920–21	338	14	0	—	42	—
600	Paul Murphy	1961–62	145	64	70	—	332	—
715	Steve Nash	1975–76	275	31	9	17	129	Great Britain
906	Scott Naylor	1993–94	114	38	0	0	152	—
634	Terry Ogden	1964–65	138	15	0	—	45	—
732	Paul O'Neill	1978–79	142	42	0	0	127	—
369	Harold Osbaldestin	1931–32	271	25	48	—	171	—
11	Arthur Pearson	1896–97	117	46	1	—	140	—
547	Bob Preece	1956–57	152	48	9	—	162	—
694	Eric Prescott	1972–73	291	51	7	1	173	—
94	Dave Preston	1902–03	256	41	1	—	125	—
657	Bob Prosser	1967–68	129	21	0	—	63	Wales
585	Trevor Rabbitt	1960–61	101	14	0	—	42	—
1068	Stefan Ratchford	2007	108	40	29	0	218	—
166	Charlie Rees	1909–10	163	21	0	—	63	Wales
120	Dai Rees	1904–05	198	14	0	—	42	Wales
40	Jack Rhapps	1897–98	286	3	1	—	11	—
672	Maurice Richards	1969–70	498	297	32	0	956	Great Britain
353	Gus Risman	1929–30	427	143	796	—	2021	Great Britain
177	Robert Ritchie	1910–11	147	9	0	—	27	—
442	Jack Rogers	1945–46	170	14	52	—	146	—
731	Steve Rule	1977–78	123	23	384	11	848	Wales
1151	Junior Sa'u	2014	142	59	0	0	236	Samoa
349	Fred Shaw	1928–29	152	2	1	—	8	—
66	Robert Shaw	1899–1900	175	8	0	—	24	—
1044	Ian Sibbit	2005	118	22	0	0	88	—
1083	Adam Sidlow	2008	112	17	0	0	68	—
1214	Ken Sio	2019	104	78	13	0	338	—
651	Peter Smethurst	1967–68	124	10	1	—	32	—
41	Dan Smith	1897–98	218	1	14	—	31	—
504	Fred Smith	1952–53	141	13	91	—	221	—
1101	Marc Sneyd	2010	133	18	376	13	837	England
916	Paul Southern	1993–94	126	7	15	0	58	Ireland
252	Fergie Southward	1920–21	340	90	158	—	586	—
619	Joe Southward	1963–64	100	20	37	—	134	—
156	George Thom	1907–08	157	6	2	—	22	—
132	Evan Thomas	1905–06	307	24	0	—	72	Wales
393	Harold Thomas	1937–38	119	6	0	—	18	Wales
98	Willie Thomas	1903–04	444	92	62	—	400	Wales
433	Peter Todd	1945–46	142	38	0	—	114	—
1156	Logan Tomkins	2014	137	8	0	0	32	—
45	Pat Tunney	1897–98	222	11	0	—	33	England
703	Sam Turnbull	1973–74	165	30	0	0	92	—
123	Silas Warwick	1904–05	209	20	1	—	62	Great Britain
367	Billy Watkins	1931–32	366	48	9	—	162	Great Britain
655	David Watkins	1967–68	407	147	1225	16	2907	Great Britain
1196	Kris Welham	2017	102	31	0	0	124	—
644	Stuart Whitehead	1966–67	223	56	0	—	168	—
201	William Wilkinson	1912–13	180	21	0	—	63	—
341	Billy Williams	1927–28	435	14	0	—	42	Great Britain
42	Jack Williams	1897–98	269	9	0	—	27	—
847	Peter Williams	1987–88	153	35	0	0	140	Great Britain
729	Stewart Williams	1977–78	223	60	0	0	197	—
402	Syd Williams	1939–40	222	81	43	—	329	Wales
43	Tom Williams	1897–98	140	84	14	—	280	—
1052	John Wilshere	2006	110	51	269	0	742	—
204	Ernest Woods	1913–14	186	9	0	—	27	—
841	Mick Worrall	1987–88	106	27	9	2	128	—
889	Dai Young	1991–92	153	15	8	0	76	Wales
