= Emlyn Jenkins =

Welsh rugby league footballer and coach (1910–1993)

Personal information
- Full name: Emlyn Jenkins
- Born: 1 December 1910 Treherbert, Rhondda, Glamorgan, Wales
- Died: 19 October 1993 (aged 82) Andover, Hampshire, England

Playing information

Rugby union
Club
Years	Team	Pld	T	G	FG	P
–1930	Treorchy RFC
1930–31	Cardiff RFC	16
	Total	16	0	0	0	0

Rugby league
- Position: Fullback, Wing, Centre, Stand-off, Scrum-half
Club
Years	Team	Pld	T	G	FG	P
1930–38	Salford	246	88	44	0	352
1938	Wigan	18	3	4	0	17
1938–≥44	Keighley	33	5	14	0	43
1941–44	→St. Helens (guest)	9	0	6	0	12
1949	Leigh	2	1	0	0	3
1951	St. Helens	1	0	0	0	0
	Total	309	97	68	0	427
Representative
Years	Team	Pld	T	G	FG	P
1932–36	Wales	4	0	0	0	0
1933	Other Nationalities	1	0	0	0	0
1933–37	Great Britain	11	3	0	0	9

Coaching information
Club
Years	Team	Gms	W	D	L	W%
1946–47	Leigh	36	21	0	15	58
1948–50	Leigh	72	38	6	28	53
1950–52	St. Helens
	Total	108	59	6	43	55

Emlyn Jenkins (1 December 1910 – October 1993) was a Welsh cinema manager, trainee teacher, landlord of a public house, rugby union, and professional rugby league footballer who played in the 1930s and 1940s, and coached rugby league in the 1950s. He played club level rugby union (RU) for Treorchy RFC, and Cardiff RFC, and representative level rugby league (RL) for Great Britain and Wales, and at club level for Salford (two spells), Wigan and St Helens (two spells, including one as a World War II guest), Leigh, as a fullback, wing, centre, stand-off, or scrum-half, and coached club level rugby league (RL) for Leigh and St Helens.

== Playing career ==
=== Salford ===
Jenkins made his debut for Salford in December 1930 against Dewsbury.

During Emlyn Jenkins time there was Salford's victories in the Championship in 1932–33 season, 1936–37 season and 1938–39 season, the 1938 Challenge Cup in 1937–38 season, the Lancashire Cup in the 1929–30 season, 1931–32 season, 1934–35 season, 1935–36 season and 1936–37 season, and the Lancashire County League during the 1932–33 season, 1933–34 season, 1934–35 season, 1936–37 season and 1938–39 season.

Emlyn Jenkins played stand-off in Salford's 3–15 defeat by Wigan in the Championship Final during the 1933–34 season at Wilderspool Stadium, Warrington on Saturday 28 April 1934.

Emlyn Jenkins was one of the players who successfully toured in France with Salford in 1934, during which the Salford team earned the name "Les Diables Rouges", the seventeen players were; Joe Bradbury, Bob Brown, Aubrey Casewell, Paddy Dalton, Bert Day, Cliff Evans, Jack Feetham, George Harris, Barney Hudson, Emlyn Jenkins, Alf Middleton, Sammy Miller, Harold Osbaldestin, Les Pearson, Gus Risman, Billy Watkins and Billy Williams.

About Emlyn Jenkins' time, there was Salford's 10–8 victory over Swinton in the 1931 Lancashire Cup Final during the 1931–32 season at The Cliff, Broughton, Salford on Saturday 21 November 1931, the 21–12 victory over Wigan in the 1934 Lancashire Cup Final during the 1934–35 season at Station Road, Swinton on Saturday 20 October 1934, the 15–7 victory over Wigan in the 1935 Lancashire Cup Final during the 1935–36 season at Wilderspool Stadium, Warrington on Saturday 19 October 1935, the 5–2 victory over Wigan in the 1936 Lancashire Cup Final during the 1936–37 season at Wilderspool Stadium, Warrington on Saturday 17 October 1936.

=== Later career ===
Jenkins was signed by Wigan in March 1938 for a fee of £700. He made his début for the club in the 19–3 victory over Newcastle (away) on Saturday 12 March 1938, he scored his first try for Wigan in the 16–13 victory over Leeds at Central Park, Wigan on Saturday 19 March 1938, he scored his last try for Wigan in the 12–8 victory over Swinton in Round-1 of the Lancashire County Cup at Central Park, Wigan on Saturday 10 September 1938, he played his last match for Wigan in the 19–0 victory over Leigh at Mather Lane, Leigh on Saturday 8 October 1938. In mid-November 1938, he announced that he was retiring from the sport at the age of 27, but by the end of the month had signed to play for Keighley. He played as centre in his début for that club against Dewsbury on 5 December 1938.

Emlyn Jenkins played for St. Helens as a guest from Salford during the Wartime Emergency Leagues, and played fullback in St. Helens' 45–38 victory over the Rugby League Players' Union in the Testimonial match for St. Helens positions Albert 'Sonny' Doyle at Knowsley Road, St. Helens on Monday 30 April 1951.

=== International honours ===
Emlyn Jenkins won 4 caps for Wales in 1932–1936 while at Salford, and won caps for Great Britain while at Salford in 1933 against Australia, in 1936 against Australia (3 matches) and New Zealand (2 matches), and in 1937 against Australia (3 matches).
