= Sammy Miller (rugby league) =

English rugby league footballer (c. 1909–1953)

Personal information
- Full name: Samuel Edward Miller
- Born: c. 1909 Aspatria, England
- Died: 1 March 1953 (aged 44) Salford, England

Playing information
- Position: Centre
Club
Years	Team	Pld	T	G	FG	P
1929–45	Salford	312	81	57		357
Representative
Years	Team	Pld	T	G	FG	P
1930–38	Cumberland	18	4	0		12

Samuel Miller (c. 1909 – 1 March 1953) was an English professional rugby league footballer who played in the 1920s, 1930s and 1940s. He played at club level for Salford, as a centre.

== Background ==
Sammy Miller was born in Aspatria, Cumberland, England.

== Playing career ==
=== Les Diables Rouges ===
Sammy Miller was one of the players who successfully toured in France with Salford in 1934, during which the Salford team earned the name "Les Diables Rouges", the seventeen players were; Joe Bradbury, Bob Brown, Aubrey Casewell, Paddy Dalton, Bert Day, Cliff Evans, Jack Feetham, George Harris, Barney Hudson, Emlyn Jenkins, Alf Middleton, Sammy Miller, Harold Osbaldestin, Les Pearson, Gus Risman, Billy Watkins and Billy Williams.

=== Championship final appearances ===
Sammy Miller played at centre in Salford's 3–15 defeat by Wigan in the Championship Final during 1933–34 season at Wilderspool Stadium, Warrington on Saturday 28 April 1934.

=== County Cup Final appearances ===
About Sammy Miller's time, there was Salford's 2-15 defeat by Warrington in the 1929–30 Lancashire Cup Final during the 1929–30 season at Central Park, Wigan on Saturday 23 November 1929, the 10-8 victory over Swinton in the 1931–32 Lancashire Cup Final during the 1931–32 season at The Cliff, Broughton, Salford on Saturday 21 November 1931, the 21-12 victory over Wigan in the 1934–35 Lancashire Cup Final during the 1934–35 season at Station Road, Swinton on Saturday 20 October 1934, the 15-7 victory over Wigan in the 1935–36 Lancashire Cup Final during the 1935–36 season at Wilderspool Stadium, Warrington on Saturday 19 October 1935, the 5-2 victory over Wigan in the 1936–37 Lancashire Cup Final during the 1936–37 season at Wilderspool Stadium, Warrington on Saturday 17 October 1936, and the 7-10 defeat by Wigan in the 1938–39 Lancashire Cup Final during the 1938–39 season at Station Road, Swinton on Saturday 22 October 1938.
