= Aubrey Casewell =

Wales international rugby league footballer

Personal information
- Full name: John Aubrey Casewell
- Born: 11 September 1909 Bala, Wales
- Died: 26 May 1974 (aged 64) Leeds, England

Playing information
- Position: Second-row
Club
Years	Team	Pld	T	G	FG	P
1928–35	Salford	187	63	0	0	189
1935–37	Leeds	80	12	0	0	36
1937–38	Halifax
1938	Keighley
1939–42	Hunslet
	Total	267	75	0	0	225
Representative
Years	Team	Pld	T	G	FG	P
1932	Wales	1	0	0	0	0

Coaching information
Club
Years	Team	Gms	W	D	L	W%
1944–45	Featherstone Rovers

John Aubrey Casewell (11 September 1909 – 26 May 1974) was a Welsh professional rugby league footballer who played in the 1920s and 1930s, and coached in the 1940s. He played at representative level for Wales, and at club level for Salford, Leeds, Halifax and Keighley, as a second-row, coached at club level for Featherstone Rovers and Hunslet Engine Company ARLFC, and he was the Secretary of the Leeds and District Rugby League.

== Playing career ==
=== Salford ===
Casewell was born in Bala, Gwynedd, Wales. He grew up in England, near Manchester, and was signed by rugby league club Salford after a successful trial. He made his debut for the club in August 1928. He played in Salford's 2-15 defeat by Warrington in the 1929 Lancashire Cup Final during the 1929–30 season at Central Park, Wigan on Saturday 23 November 1929.

In 1930, he joined the local police force, which limited his appearances for the club over the next two years.

Casewell was one of the players who successfully toured in France with Salford in 1934, during which the Salford team earned the name "Les Diables Rouges", the seventeen players were; Joe Bradbury, Bob Brown, Aubrey Casewell, Paddy Dalton, Bert Day, Cliff Evans, Jack Feetham, George Harris, Barney Hudson, Emlyn Jenkins, Alf Middleton, Sammy Miller, Harold Osbaldestin, Les Pearson, Gus Risman, Billy Watkins and Billy Williams.

Casewell played in Salford's 15-5 victory over Swinton in the Championship Final during the 1932–33 season, and played at second-row in the 3-15 defeat by Wigan in the Championship Final during the 1933–34 season at Wilderspool Stadium, Warrington on Saturday 28 April 1934.

Aubrey Casewell played in Salford's victories in the Lancashire League during the 1932–33 season, 1933–34 season and 1934–35 season.

=== Leeds ===
Casewell was transferred to Leeds on 18 January 1935. He made his début for the club a day later against Warrington at Headingley.

During the 1935–36 season, Casewell played in Leeds' 3–0 win against York in the 1935–36 Yorkshire Cup final on 19 October 1935, and played in the club's 18–2 victory over Warrington in the 1935–36 Challenge Cup Final at Wembley Stadium, London on Saturday 18 April 1936.

He played in Leeds' victory in the Yorkshire League during the 1936–37 season.

=== Later career ===
Casewell was transferred to Halifax in August 1937. In January 1938, he joined Keighley. In 1939, he was transferred to Hunslet.

=== International honours ===
Aubrey Casewell won a cap for Wales while at Salford in 1932.

=== All Six Cups ===
Only five rugby league footballers have won "All Six Cups" during their career, they are; Aubrey Casewell (while at Salford and Leeds), Alan Edwards (while at Salford and Bradford Northern), John Etty (while at Oldham and Wakefield Trinity), Edward "Ted" Slevin (while at Wigan and Huddersfield), and Derek Turner (while at Oldham and Wakefield Trinity). "All Six Cups" being the Challenge Cup, Championship, Lancashire Cup, Lancashire League, Yorkshire Cup and Yorkshire League.

== Post-playing ==
In 1944, Casewell was appointed as coach at Featherstone Rovers. He was later appointed as secretary of the Leeds and District Rugby League, a role which he carried out for over 20 years.

He died in Leeds on 26 May 1974, aged 64.
