= Harold Osbaldestin =

English rugby league footballer

Personal information
- Full name: Harold Osbaldestin
- Born: 20 February 1909 Whelley, Wigan, England
- Died: September 1955 (aged 46) Salford, England

Playing information
- Position: Fullback
Club
Years	Team	Pld	T	G	FG	P
1926–29	Wigan Highfield	96
1929–31	Dewsbury	74
1931–39	Salford	271	25	48		171
	Total	441	25	48	0	171
Representative
Years	Team	Pld	T	G	FG	P
1933–35	Lancashire	4	0	2	0	4

Harold Osbaldestin (20 February 1909 – September 1955) was an English professional rugby league footballer who played in the 1920s and 1930s. He played at club level for Salford, as a fullback.

== Background ==
Harold Osbaldestin was born in Whelley, Wigan, Lancashire, England, and he died aged 46 in Swinton, Lancashire, England.

== Playing career ==
=== Salford ===
Osbaldestin debuted for Salford in October 1931. During his time at the club, he played in four Lancashire Cup finals; the 21–12 victory over Wigan in the 1934 Lancashire Cup Final during the 1934–35 season at Station Road, Swinton on Saturday 20 October 1934, the 15–7 victory over Wigan in the 1935 Lancashire Cup Final during the 1935–36 season at Wilderspool Stadium, Warrington on Saturday 19 October 1935, the 5–2 victory over Wigan in the 1936 Lancashire Cup Final during the 1936–37 season at Wilderspool Stadium, Warrington on Saturday 17 October 1936, and he played fullback in the 7–10 defeat by Wigan in the 1938 Lancashire Cup Final during the 1938–39 season at Station Road, Swinton on Saturday 22 October 1938.

Osbaldestin was one of the players who successfully toured in France with Salford in 1934, during which the Salford team earned the name "Les Diables Rouges", the seventeen players were; Joe Bradbury, Bob Brown, Aubrey Casewell, Paddy Dalton, Bert Day, Cliff Evans, Jack Feetham, George Harris, Barney Hudson, Emlyn Jenkins, Alf Middleton, Sammy Miller, Osbaldestin, Les Pearson, Gus Risman, Billy Watkins and Billy Williams.

Osbaldestin played fullback in Salford's 3–15 defeat by Wigan in the Championship Final during the 1933–34 season at Wilderspool Stadium, Warrington on Saturday 28 April 1934.

Osbaldestin played fullback in Salford's 7–4 victory over Barrow in the 1938 Challenge Cup Final during the 1937–38 season at Wembley Stadium, London, on Saturday 7 May 1938. He also played in the 1939 Challenge Cup final defeat against Halifax, but suffered an injury in the second half, and was unable to continue. It was later discovered that he had suffered an achilles tendon rupture, effectively ending his playing career. He attempted a comeback with Salford after the Second World War, but did not make any further appearances for the first team.

== Personal life ==
Osbaldestin's marriage to Jane Ellen ('Nellie') (née Gregson) took place on Tuesday 27 December 1932 at St Stephen's Church, Whelley, Wigan.

Osbaldestin died in September 1955 at Salford Royal Hospital.
