= Barney Hudson =

GB & England international rugby league footballer (1906–1971)

- Senior Service Cigarette card featuring Barney Hudson

Personal information
- Full name: Bernard Hudson
- Born: first ¼ 1906 Horden, England
- Died: 1971 (aged 64–65)

Playing information
- Position: Wing
Club
Years	Team	Pld	T	G	FG	P
1928–46	Salford	411	282	58	0	962
1941–43	→ Dewsbury (guest)	67	46	5	0	148
	Total	478	328	63	0	1110
Representative
Years	Team	Pld	T	G	FG	P
1934–38	England	6	5	0	0	15
1932–37	Great Britain	8	7	0	0	21

Bernard "Barney" Hudson (birth registered first ¼ 1906 – 1971) was an English rugby union, and professional rugby league footballer who played in the 1920s, 1930s and 1940s. He played club level rugby union (RU) for Horden Rugby Football Club and Hartlepool Rovers, and representative level rugby league (RL) for Great Britain and England, and at club level for Salford, as a wing. Whilst serving in the Royal Air Force during the Second World War, he was a guest player, and captained Dewsbury.

== Background ==
Barney Hudson's birth was registered in Horden, County Durham, and he died aged 65.

== Playing career ==
=== Salford ===
Hudson started his career as a rugby union player, and appeared for his local team Horden Rugby Football Club and later Hartlepool Rovers before joining Salford in Easter 1928. He made his début against Wigan Highfield on 6 April 1928. He was one of the players who successfully toured in France with Salford in 1934, during which the Salford team earned the name "Les Diables Rouges", the seventeen players were; Joe Bradbury, Bob Brown, Aubrey Casewell, Paddy Dalton, Bert Day, Cliff Evans, Jack Feetham, George Harris, Barney Hudson, Emlyn Jenkins, Alf Middleton, Sammy Miller, Harold Osbaldestin, Les Pearson, Gus Risman, Billy Watkins and Billy Williams.

==== Championship final appearances ====
Hudson played in Salford's 15-5 victory over Swinton in the Championship Final during the 1932–33 season, played in the 13-11 victory over Warrington in the Championship Final during the 1936–37 season, and played in the 8-6 victory over Castleford in the Championship Final during the 1938–39 season.

==== County League appearances ====
Hudson played in Salford's victories in the Lancashire League during the 1932–33 season, 1933–34 season, 1934–35 season, 1936–37 season and 1938–39 season.

==== Challenge Cup Final appearances ====
Hudson played on the wing in Salford's 7-4 victory over Barrow in the 1938 Challenge Cup Final during the 1937–38 season at Wembley Stadium, London, in front of a crowd of 51,243.

==== County Cup Final appearances ====
Hudson played in Salford's 10-8 victory over Swinton in the 1931 Lancashire Cup Final during the 1931–32 season at The Cliff, Broughton, Salford on Saturday 21 November 1931, played in the 21-12 victory over Wigan in the 1934 Lancashire Cup Final during the 1934–35 season at Station Road, Swinton on Saturday 20 October 1934, played in the 15-7 victory over Wigan in the 1935 Lancashire Cup Final during the 1935–36 season at Wilderspool Stadium, Warrington on Saturday 19 October 1935, and played in the 5-2 victory over Wigan in the 1936 Lancashire Cup Final during the 1936–37 season at Wilderspool Stadium, Warrington on Saturday 17 October 1936.

=== Dewsbury ===
==== Championship final appearances ====
Hudson played in Dewsbury's 13-0 victory over Bradford Northern in the Championship Final during the 1941–42 season at Headingley, Leeds in front of a crowd of 18,000, and played on the wing in the 14-25 aggregate defeat by Wigan in the Championship Final during the 1943–44 season; the 9-13 first-leg defeat at Central Park, Wigan on Saturday 13 May 1944, and the 5-12 second-leg defeat at Crown Flatt, Dewsbury on Saturday 20 May 1944.

==== Challenge Cup Final appearances ====
Hudson played in Dewsbury's 16-15 aggregate victory over Leeds in the 1943 Challenge Cup Final during the 1942–43 season; the 16-9 first-leg victory at Crown Flatt, Dewsbury on Sunday 9 May 1943, in front of a crowd of 10,470, and the 0-6 second-leg defeat at Headingley, Leeds on Sunday 16 May 1943, in front of a crowd of 16,000.

==== County Cup Final appearances ====
Hudson played in Dewsbury's 7-2 aggregate victory over Huddersfield in the 1942 Yorkshire Cup Final during the 1942–43 season; the 7-0 first-leg victory at Crown Flatt, Dewsbury on Saturday 28 November 1942, in front of a crowd of 11,000, and the 0-2 second-leg defeat at Fartown Ground, Huddersfield on Saturday 5 December 1942.

=== International career ===
Hudson won caps for England while at Salford in 1934 against Australia, in 1935 against France, and Wales, in 1936 against Wales, and France, in 1938 against Wales, and won caps for Great Britain while at Salford in against 1932 New Zealand, in 1933 against Australia (2 matches), in 1936 against Australia, and New Zealand (2 matches), and in 1937 against Australia (2 matches).
