= Alf Middleton =

English rugby league footballer

Personal information
- Full name: Alfred Middleton
- Born: Nuneaton, Warwickshire, England
- Died: England

Playing information
- Position: Second-row
Club
Years	Team	Pld	T	G	FG	P
1928–36	Salford	285	67	25		251
Representative
Years	Team	Pld	T	G	FG	P
1931	England	1	0	0	0	0
1929	Great Britain	1	1	0	0	1

Alfred "Alf" Middleton was an English professional rugby league footballer who played in the 1920s and 1930s. He played at representative level for Great Britain and England, and at club level for Salford (captain c. 1929–30 season), as a second-row.

== Playing career ==
=== Salford ===
Middleton had previously played rugby union for Nuneaton RFC and Coventry RFC before switching to rugby league and joining Salford. He debuted for the club in November 1928.

Middleton was one of the players who successfully toured in France with Salford in 1934, during which the Salford team earned the name "Les Diables Rouges", the seventeen players were; Joe Bradbury, Bob Brown, Aubrey Casewell, Paddy Dalton, Bert Day, Cliff Evans, Jack Feetham, George Harris, Barney Hudson, Emlyn Jenkins, Alf Middleton, Sammy Miller, Harold Osbaldestin, Les Pearson, Gus Risman, Billy Watkins and Billy Williams.

Middleton played right-second-row in Salford's 3–15 defeat by Wigan in the Championship Final during the 1933–34 season Final at Wilderspool Stadium, Warrington on Saturday 28 April 1934.

Middleton played for the club in four Lancashire Cup finals; there was Salford's 2–15 defeat by Warrington in the 1929 Lancashire Cup Final during the 1929–30 season at Central Park, Wigan on Saturday 23 November 1929, the 10–8 victory over Swinton in the 1931 Lancashire Cup Final during the 1931–32 season at The Cliff, Broughton, Salford on Saturday 21 November 1931, the 21–12 victory over Wigan in the 1934 Lancashire Cup Final during the 1934–35 season at Station Road, Swinton on Saturday 20 October 1934, and the 15–7 victory over Wigan in the 1935 Lancashire Cup Final during the 1935–36 season at Wilderspool Stadium, Warrington on Saturday 19 October 1935.

=== International honours ===
Middleton won a cap for England while at Salford in 1931 against Wales, and won a cap for Great Britain while at Salford in 1929 against Australia.

== Post-playing ==
Middleton retired from rugby league in 1936 to focus on his business ventures. He later returned to the sport as an administrator, and was appointed as club secretary at Hull in 1945, before taking up a similar role at Barrow a year later. In 1950, he was reported to be involved in an early attempt to set up a rugby league club in Blackpool.
