= Bob Brown (rugby league) =

English rugby league footballer (1907–1987)

Personal information
- Full name: Robert Brown
- Born: 15 December 1907 Wigan, England
- Died: February 1987 (aged 79) Salford, England

Playing information
- Position: Wing, Centre
Club
Years	Team	Pld	T	G	FG	P
1927–32	Wigan	75	54	1	0	164
1932–38	Salford	251	136	0	0	408
1939–40	Rochdale Hornets	25
1942–42	→ St Helens (guest)	1	0	0	0	0
	Total	352	190	1	0	572
Representative
Years	Team	Pld	T	G	FG	P
1932–38	Lancashire	9	3	0	0	9

Robert Brown (15 Dec 1907 – Feb 1987) was an English professional rugby league footballer who played in the 1930s. He played at representative level for Lancashire, and at club level for Wigan and Salford, as a wing or centre.

== Background ==
Bob Brown was born in Wigan, Lancashire, England.

== Playing career ==
=== County honours ===
Bob Brown played on the wing in Lancashire's 7–5 victory over Australia in the 1937–38 Kangaroo tour match at Wilderspool Stadium, Warrington on Wednesday 29 September 1937, in front of a crowd of 16,250.

=== Les Diables Rouges ===
Bob Brown was one of the players who successfully toured in France with Salford in 1934, during which the Salford team earned the name "Les Diables Rouges", the seventeen players were; Joe Bradbury, Bob Brown, Aubrey Casewell, Paddy Dalton, Bert Day, Cliff Evans, Jack Feetham, George Harris, Barney Hudson, Emlyn Jenkins, Alf Middleton, Sammy Miller, Harold Osbaldestin, Les Pearson, Gus Risman, Billy Watkins and Billy Williams.

=== Championship final appearances ===
Bob Brown played on the wing in Salford's 3–15 defeat by Wigan in the Championship Final during the 1933–34 season at Wilderspool Stadium, Warrington on Saturday 28 April 1934.

=== Challenge Cup Final appearances ===
Bob Brown played centre in Salford's 7–4 victory over Barrow in the 1938 Challenge Cup Final during the 1937–38 season at Wembley Stadium, London, in front of a crowd of 51,243.

=== County Cup Final appearances ===
About Bob Brown's time, there was Salford's 21–12 victory over Wigan in the 1934 Lancashire Cup Final during the 1934–35 season at Station Road, Swinton on Saturday 20 October 1934, the 15–7 victory over Wigan in the 1935 Lancashire Cup Final during the 1935–36 season at Wilderspool Stadium, Warrington on Saturday 19 October 1935, the 5–2 victory over Wigan in the 1936 Lancashire Cup Final during the 1936–37 season at Wilderspool Stadium, Warrington on Saturday 17 October 1936, and he played at centre in the 7–10 defeat by Wigan in the 1938 Lancashire Cup Final during the 1938–39 season at Station Road, Swinton on Saturday 22 October 1938.
