= Billy Watkins (rugby, born c. 1910) =

British international rugby league footballer (1910–1972)

Personal information
- Full name: William Edward Watkins
- Born: c. 1910
- Died: January 1972 (aged 61)

Playing information

Rugby union
Club
Years	Team	Pld	T	G	FG	P
	Cross Keys RFC

Rugby league
- Position: Scrum-half
Club
Years	Team	Pld	T	G	FG	P
1931–46	Salford	435	14	0	0	42
1940–41	→Oldham RLFC (guest)	1	0	1	0	2
1946–48	Belle Vue Rangers
	Total	436	14	1	0	44
Representative
Years	Team	Pld	T	G	FG	P
1932–36	Wales	6	1	0	0	3
1933–37	Great Britain	7	0	0	0	0

William Edward Watkins (c. 1910 – January 1972) was a Welsh rugby union, and professional rugby league footballer who played in the 1930s and 1940s. He played club level rugby union (RU) for Cross Keys RFC, and representative level rugby league (RL) for Great Britain and Wales, and at club level for Salford and wartime-guest at Oldham RLFC, as a scrum-half.

== Playing career ==
=== Salford ===
Watkins played in the 10–8 victory over Swinton in the 1931 Lancashire Cup Final during the 1931–32 season at The Cliff, Broughton, Salford on Saturday 21 November 1931.

Watkins played scrum-half in Salford's 3–15 defeat by Wigan in the Championship Final during the 1933–34 season at Wilderspool Stadium, Warrington on Saturday 28 April 1934.

Watkins was one of the players who successfully toured in France with Salford in 1934, during which the Salford team earned the name "Les Diables Rouges", the seventeen players were; Joe Bradbury, Bob Brown, Aubrey Casewell, Paddy Dalton, Bert Day, Cliff Evans, Jack Feetham, George Harris, Barney Hudson, Emlyn Jenkins, Alf Middleton, Sammy Miller, Harold Osbaldestin, Les Pearson, Gus Risman, Billy Watkins and Billy Williams.

He played in the 21–12 victory over Wigan in the 1934 Lancashire Cup Final during the 1934–35 season at Station Road, Swinton on Saturday 20 October 1934, the 15–7 victory over Wigan in the 1935 Lancashire Cup Final during the 1935–36 season at Wilderspool Stadium, Warrington on Saturday 19 October 1935 and the 5–2 victory over Wigan in the 1936 Lancashire Cup Final during the 1936–37 season at Wilderspool Stadium, Warrington.

Watkins played scrum-half in Salford's 7–4 victory over Barrow in the 1938 Challenge Cup Final during the 1937–38 season at Wembley Stadium, London, in front of a crowd of 51,243.

Watkins played scrum-half in the 7–10 defeat by Wigan in the 1938 Lancashire Cup Final during the 1938–39 season at Station Road, Swinton on Saturday 22 October 1938.

=== Belle Vue Rangers ===
Watkins signed for Belle Vue Rangers in August 1946.

=== International honours ===
Watkins won caps for Wales (RL) while at Salford in 1932–1936 6-caps, and won caps for Great Britain (RL) while at Salford in 1933 against Australia, in 1936 against Australia (2 matches), New Zealand (2 matches), and in 1937 against Australia (2 matches).

== Family ==
Billy Watkins was the father of; Huw Watkins, Gareth Watkins and Haydn Watkins, and the grandfather of the cricketer, Ryan Watkins.
