= Joe Bradbury =

English rugby league footballer

Personal information
- Full name: Joseph Bradbury
- Born: unknown Wigan, England
- Died: unknown

Playing information
- Position: Prop
Club
Years	Team	Pld	T	G	FG	P
1930–40	Salford	299	15	0		45
≥194?–≤4?	→ Castleford (guest)
≥1946–≤46	→ Huddersfield (guest)
	Total	299	15	0	0	45

Joseph Bradbury was an English professional rugby league footballer who played in the 1930s and 1940s. He played at club level for Salford, Castleford and Huddersfield (two spells, including the first as a World War II guest), as a prop.

== Background ==
Joe Bradbury was born in Wigan, Lancashire, England.

== Playing career ==
=== Les Diables Rouges ===
Joe Bradbury was one of the players who successfully toured in France with Salford in 1934, during which the Salford team earned the name "Les Diables Rouges", the seventeen players were; Joe Bradbury, Bob Brown, Aubrey Casewell, Paddy Dalton, Bert Day, Cliff Evans, Jack Feetham, George Harris, Barney Hudson, Emlyn Jenkins, Alf Middleton, Sammy Miller, Harold Osbaldestin, Les Pearson, Gus Risman, Billy Watkins and Billy Williams.

=== Championship final appearances ===
Joe Bradbury played at prop in Salford's 3-15 defeat by Wigan in the Championship Final during the 1933–34 season at Wilderspool Stadium, Warrington on Saturday 28 April 1934, and played at prop in Huddersfield's 4-13 defeat by Wigan in the Championship Final during the 1945–46 season at Maine Road, Manchester on Saturday 18 May 1946.

=== Challenge Cup Final appearances ===
Joe Bradbury played at prop in Huddersfield's 13–9 aggregate victory over Bradford Northern in the 1944–45 Challenge Cup Final during the 1944–45 season; the 7-4 victory in the first-leg at Fartown Ground, Huddersfield on Saturday 28 April 1945, and Mallinson played at prop in the 6-5 victory in the second-leg at Odsal Stadium, Bradford on Saturday 5 May 1945.

=== County Cup Final appearances ===
About Joe Bradbury's time, there was Salford's 10-8 victory over Swinton in the 1931–32 Lancashire Cup Final during the 1931–32 season at The Cliff, Broughton, Salford on Saturday 21 November 1931, the 21-12 victory over Wigan in the 1934–35 Lancashire Cup Final during the 1934–35 season at Station Road, Swinton on Saturday 20 October 1934, the 15-7 victory over Wigan in the 1935–36 Lancashire Cup Final during the 1935–36 season at Wilderspool Stadium, Warrington on Saturday 19 October 1935, the 5-2 victory over Wigan in the 1936–37 Lancashire Cup Final during the 1936–37 season at Wilderspool Stadium, Warrington on Saturday 17 October 1936, and he played at prop in the 7-10 defeat by Wigan in the 1938–39 Lancashire Cup Final during the 1938–39 season at Station Road, Swinton on Saturday 22 October 1938.
