= Jack Feetham =

Great Britain and England international rugby league footballer (c. 1909–1968)

- Senior Service Cigarette card featuring Jack Feetham

Personal information
- Full name: John Feetham
- Born: c. 1909 Hull, England
- Died: March 1968 (aged 59) Hull, England

Playing information
- Position: Prop, Loose forward
Club
Years	Team	Pld	T	G	FG	P
1926–29	Hull Kingston Rovers	84	24	0	0	72
1929–47	Salford	409	109	0	0	327
	Total	493	133	0	0	399
Representative
Years	Team	Pld	T	G	FG	P
1932	England	1	0	0	0	0
1929–33	Great Britain	8	2	0	0	6

John Feetham (c. 1909 – March 1968) was an English professional rugby league footballer who played in the 1920s, 1930s and 1940s. He played at representative level for Great Britain and England, and at club level for Hull Kingston Rovers, and Salford, as a prop or loose forward.

== Background ==
Jack Feetham's birth was registered in Hull, East Riding of Yorkshire, England.

== Playing career ==
=== Club career ===
Feetham was one of the players who successfully toured in France with Salford in 1934, during which the Salford team earned the name "Les Diables Rouges", the seventeen players were; Joe Bradbury, Bob Brown, Aubrey Casewell, Paddy Dalton, Bert Day, Cliff Evans, Jack Feetham, George Harris, Barney Hudson, Emlyn Jenkins, Alf Middleton, Sammy Miller, Harold Osbaldestin, Les Pearson, Gus Risman, Billy Watkins and Billy Williams.

Feetham played loose forward in Salford's 3–15 defeat by Wigan in the Championship Final during the 1933–34 season at Wilderspool Stadium, Warrington on Saturday 28 April 1934.

Feetham played loose forward in Salford's 7–4 victory over Barrow in the 1938 Challenge Cup Final during the 1937–38 season at Wembley Stadium, London, in front of a crowd of 51,243.

About Feetham's time, there was Salford's 10–8 victory over Swinton in the 1931 Lancashire Cup Final during the 1931–32 season at The Cliff, Broughton, Salford on Saturday 21 November 1931, the 21–12 victory over Wigan in the 1934 Lancashire Cup Final during the 1934–35 season at Station Road, Swinton on Saturday 20 October 1934, the 15–7 victory over Wigan in the 1935 Lancashire Cup Final during the 1935–36 season at Wilderspool Stadium, Warrington on Saturday 19 October 1935, the 5–2 victory over Wigan in the 1936 Lancashire Cup Final during the 1936–37 season at Wilderspool Stadium, Warrington on Saturday 17 October 1936, and he played loose forward in the 7–10 defeat by Wigan in the 1938 Lancashire Cup Final during the 1938–39 season at Station Road, Swinton on Saturday 22 October 1938.

=== International honours ===
Feetham won a cap for England while at Salford in 1932 against Wales, and won caps for Great Britain while at Kingston Rovers in 1929–30 against Australia, while at Salford in 1932 against Australia (2 matches), and New Zealand (2 matches), and in 1933 against Australia (3 matches).

== Retirement and death ==
After finishing his playing career, Feetham became a licensee in Salford before moving to Oldham. In 1954, he returned to his hometown and took charge of the Tivoli Hotel in Mytongate. In March 1968, he died in his home in East Hull, aged 59.
