= Alan Edwards (rugby) =

GB & Wales international rugby league footballer (c. 1918–1987)

Personal information
- Full name: Alan Spencer Edwards
- Born: c. 1918 Kenfig Hill, Bridgend, Wales
- Died: January 1987 (aged 69) Canada

Playing information

Rugby union
Club
Years	Team	Pld	T	G	FG	P
	Aberavon RFC

Rugby league
- Position: Wing
Club
Years	Team	Pld	T	G	FG	P
1935–46	Salford	199	129	29	0	445
1942	→ Leeds (guest)	2	2	0	0	6
1942–44	→ Dewsbury (guest)	45	34	5	0	112
1939–45	→ Bradford Northern (guest)	36	9	0	0	27
1946–49	Bradford Northern	97	74	33	0	288
	Total	379	248	67	0	878
Representative
Years	Team	Pld	T	G	FG	P
1935–48	Wales	18	9	0	0	27
1936–37	Great Britain	7	7	0	0	21
1936	GB tour games	11	17	0	0	51

Alan Spencer Edwards (c. 1918 – January 1987) was a Welsh rugby union, and professional rugby league footballer who played in the 1930s and 1940s. He played club level rugby union (RU) for Aberavon RFC, the Royal Air Force, and representative level rugby league (RL) for Great Britain and Wales, and at club level for Salford, Leeds (World War II guest), Dewsbury (World War II guest), and Bradford Northern (two spells, including the first as a World War II guest), as a wing.

== Background ==
Alan Edwards was born in Kenfig Hill, Bridgend.

== Playing career ==
=== International honours ===
Alan Edwards won 18 caps for Wales (RL) in 1935–1948 while at Salford and Bradford Northern, and won caps for Great Britain (RL) while at Salford in 1936 against Australia (3 matches), and New Zealand (2 matches); and in 1937 against Australia (2 matches). He was the youngest member of the 1936 tour party

=== Championship final appearances ===
Alan Edwards played on the wing in Salford's Championship winning teams of 1937 and 1939. They beat Warrington 13-11 in 1937 and Edwards scored the winning try in 1939 when Salford beat Castleford 8-6 at Maine Road Manchester. He played in Dewsbury's 14-25 aggregate defeat by Wigan in the War-time emergency play-off Final during the 1943–44 season; the 9-13 first-leg defeat at Central Park, Wigan on Saturday 13 May 1944, and the 5-12-second-leg defeat at Crown Flatt, Dewsbury on Saturday 20 May 1944. The year after he played for Bradford Northern when they beat Halifax 26-20 on aggregate to win the last war-time emergency play-off. He played in his last Championship Final in 1948 when he was in the Bradford Northern team that lost 15-5 to Warrington at Maine Road, Manchester.

=== County League appearances ===
Alan Edwards played in Salford's victories in the Lancashire League during the 1936–37 season and 1938–39 season, and played in Bradford Northern's victory in the Yorkshire League during the 1947–48 season.

=== Challenge Cup Final appearances ===
Alan Edwards played on the wing in Salford's 7-4 victory over Barrow in the 1937–38 Challenge Cup Final during the 1937–38 season at Wembley Stadium, London, on Saturday 7 May 1938, in front of a crowd of 51,243, played on the wing in the 3-20 defeat by Halifax in the 1938–39 Challenge Cup Final during the 1938–39 season at Wembley Stadium, London, on Saturday 6 May 1939, in front of a crowd of 55,453, played on the wing in Leeds' 15-10 victory over Halifax in the 1941–42 Challenge Cup Final during the 1941–42 season at Odsal Stadium, Bradford, in front of a crowd of 15,250. played in Dewsbury's 16-15 aggregate victory over Leeds in the 1942–43 Challenge Cup Final during the 1942–43 season; the 16-9 first-leg victory at Crown Flatt, Dewsbury on Sunday 9 May 1943, in front of a crowd of 10,470, and the 0-6 second-leg defeat at Headingley, Leeds on Sunday 16 May 1943, in front of a crowd of 16,000, played at centre in Bradford Northern's 9-13 aggregate defeat by Huddersfield in the 1944–45 Challenge Cup Final during the 1944–45 season; the 4-7 defeat at Fartown Ground, Huddersfield on Saturday 28 April 1945, in front of a crowd of 9,041, and the 5-6 defeat at Odsal Stadium, Bradford on Saturday 5 May 1945 (three days before Victory in Europe Day), in front of a crowd of 17,500, played on the wing, and scored a try in the 8-3 defeat by Wigan in the 1947–48 Challenge Cup Final during the 1947–48 season at Wembley Stadium, London on Saturday 1 May 1948, in front of a crowd of 91,465, and played on the wing in his last final in the 12-0 victory over Halifax in the 1948–49 Challenge Cup Final during the 1948–49 season at Wembley Stadium, London on Saturday 7 May 1949, in front of a crowd of 95,050. He played in a total of seven Rugby League Challenge Cup Finals which was a record at that time he shared with Eric Batten. He was the first man to play for four different teams in the Challenge Cup Final and the only man to win the Challenge Cup with four different teams.

=== County Cup Final appearances ===
About Alan Edwards' time, there was Salford 15-7 victory over Wigan in the 1935 Lancashire Cup Final during the 1935–36 season at Wilderspool Stadium, Warrington on Saturday 19 October 1935, the 5-2 victory over Wigan in the 1936–37 Lancashire Cup Final during the 1936–37 season at Wilderspool Stadium, Warrington on Saturday 17 October 1936, he played on the wing in the 7-10 defeat by Wigan in the 1938–39 Lancashire Cup Final during the 1938–39 season at Station Road, Swinton on Saturday 22 October 1938. and played on the wing and scored two tries, and three goals in Bradford Northern's 18-9 victory over Castleford in the 1948–49 Yorkshire Cup Final during the 1948–49 season at Headingley, Leeds on Saturday 30 October 1948.

=== Other notable matches ===
Alan Edwards played on the wing for a Rugby League XIII against Northern Command XIII at Thrum Hall, Halifax on Saturday 21 March 1942.

=== All Six Cups ===
Only five rugby league footballers have won "All Six Cups" during their career, they are; Aubrey Casewell (while at Salford and Leeds), Alan Edwards (while at Salford and Bradford Northern), John Etty (while at Oldham and Wakefield Trinity), Edward "Ted" Slevin (while at Wigan and Huddersfield), and Derek Turner (while at Oldham and Wakefield Trinity). "All Six Cups" being the Challenge Cup, Championship, Lancashire Cup, Lancashire League, Yorkshire Cup and Yorkshire League.

=== Career records ===
Alan Edwards is one of less than twenty-five Welshmen to have scored more than 1000-points in their rugby league career.

=== Personal life ===
Edwards' marriage to Jessie (née Burgess) was registered on 28 December 1941 in Salford district. They had two children, Alan Blair Edwards (birth registered during second ¼ 1943 (age 82–83) in Salford district), and Marvyn A. Edwards (birth registered during third ¼ 1944 (age 81–82) in Salford district).

Edwards later emigrated to Canada, where he died in January 1987, aged 69.
