= Bert Day =

Wales dual-code rugby international footballer

Personal information
- Born: Hubert Charles Day; 8 May 1908 Griffithstown, Wales
- Died: 27 June 1977 (aged 69) Salford, England

Playing information

Rugby union
- Position: Hooker
Club
Years	Team	Pld	T	G	FG	P
	Blaenavon RFC
	Pontypool RFC
1927	Newport RFC
	Total	0	0	0	0	0
Representative
Years	Team	Pld	T	G	FG	P
1930–31	Wales	5				0

Rugby league
- Position: Forward
Club
Years	Team	Pld	T	G	FG	P
1931–48	Salford	488	6	0	0	18
Representative
Years	Team	Pld	T	G	FG	P
1935–45	Wales	3	0	0	0	0

Hubert Charles Day (8 May 1908 – 27 June 1977) was a rugby hooker who played rugby union for Newport and rugby league for Salford. He was awarded five caps for Wales under union rules and was part of the Welsh side that won the 1931 Five Nations Championship. At Salford Day forged a reputation as the greatest hooker to play for the club, his record 488 appearances for the club went unbroken for over 35 years.

== Background ==
Bert Day was born in Griffithstown, Monmouthshire, and he died aged 69 in Salford, Greater Manchester, England.

== Rugby career ==
Day was first selected for Wales in the 1930 Five Nations Championship in a match against Scotland at Murrayfield. Day was one of two new caps in the Welsh squad alongside Swansea's Dai Thomas. Wales lost the match 9-12, but Day was reselected for the next game of the tournament in a win over Ireland, under the captaincy of Jack Bassett. The final game of the Championship was an away game to France. The match was notoriously bad tempered with the referee forced to make multiple stoppages to reproach both packs as fist fights broke out throughout the game. Day himself was kicked in the mouth and was forced to leave the pitch to have several stitches in his lip.

Day played twice in the 1931 Five Nations Championship which Wales won after drawing against England and beating the remaining three teams. Day's final match was the second game in a victory over Scotland at the Cardiff Arms Park. Day later switched codes, 'Going North' to join Salford RLFC.

=== International matches played ===
Wales

- England 1931
- France 1930
- Ireland 1930
- Scotland 1930, 1931

=== International honours ===
Bert Day won caps for Wales while at Salford 1935…1945 3-caps.

=== Challenge Cup Final appearances ===
Bert Day played hooker in Salford's 7-4 victory over Barrow in the 1938 Challenge Cup Final during the 1937–38 season at Wembley Stadium, London, in front of a crowd of 51,243.

=== County Cup Final appearances ===
About Bert Day's time, there was Salford's 10-8 victory over Swinton in the 1931 Lancashire Cup Final during the 1931–32 season at The Cliff, Broughton, Salford on Saturday 21 November 1931, the 21-12 victory over Wigan in the 1934 Lancashire Cup Final during the 1934–35 season at Station Road, Swinton on Saturday 20 October 1934, the 15-7 victory over Wigan in the 1935 Lancashire Cup Final during the 1935–36 season at Wilderspool Stadium, Warrington on Saturday 19 October 1935, the 5-2 victory over Wigan in the 1936 Lancashire Cup Final during the 1936–37 season at Wilderspool Stadium, Warrington on Saturday 17 October 1936, and played hooker in the 7-10 defeat by Wigan in the 1938 Lancashire Cup Final during the 1938–39 season at Station Road, Swinton on Saturday 22 October 1938.

=== Les Diables Rouges ===
Day was one of the players who successfully toured in France with Salford in 1934, during which the Salford team earned the name "Les Diables Rouges", the seventeen players were; Joe Bradbury, Bob Brown, Aubrey Casewell, Paddy Dalton, Bert Day, Cliff Evans, Jack Feetham, George Harris, Barney Hudson, Emlyn Jenkins, Alf Middleton, Sammy Miller, Harold Osbaldestin, Les Pearson, Gus Risman, Billy Watkins and Billy Williams.

== Bibliography ==
- Billot, John (1974). Springboks in Wales. Ferndale: Ron Jones Publications.
- Smith, David; Williams, Gareth (1980). Fields of Praise: The Official History of The Welsh Rugby Union. Cardiff: University of Wales Press. ISBN 0-7083-0766-3.
