= Paddy Dalton =

England international rugby league footballer (1907–unknown)

Personal information
- Born: Summer 1907 Harrington, Cumbria, England

Playing information
- Position: Second-row, Loose forward
Club
Years	Team	Pld	T	G	FG	P
1930–40	Salford	291	58	0	0	174
Representative
Years	Team	Pld	T	G	FG	P
1933–38	Cumberland	13
1934	English League XIII	1
1934–36	England	5	0	0	0	0

Patrick Dalton (summer 1907 – ?) was an English professional rugby league footballer who played in the 1930s and 1940s. He played at representative level for England, and English League XIII, and at club level for Salford, as a second-row or loose forward.

== Background ==
Paddy Dalton's birth was registered in Harrington, Cumberland, England.

== Playing career ==
=== Club career ===
Dalton made his first team debut for Salford in November 1930.

About Paddy Dalton's time, there was Salford's 10–8 victory over Swinton in the 1931–32 Lancashire Cup Final during the 1931–32 season at The Cliff, Broughton, Salford on Saturday 21 November 1931, the 21–12 victory over Wigan in the 1934–35 Lancashire Cup Final during the 1934–35 season at Station Road, Swinton on Saturday 20 October 1934, the 15–7 victory over Wigan in the 1935–36 Lancashire Cup Final during the 1935–36 season at Wilderspool Stadium, Warrington on Saturday 19 October 1935, the 5–2 victory over Wigan in the 1936–37 Lancashire Cup Final during the 1936–37 season at Wilderspool Stadium, Warrington on Saturday 17 October 1936, and he played at second-row in the 7–10 defeat by Wigan in the 1938–39 Lancashire Cup Final during the 1938–39 season at Station Road, Swinton on Saturday 22 October 1938.

Dalton played at second-row in Salford's 7–4 victory over Barrow in the 1937–38 Challenge Cup Final during the 1937–38 season at Wembley Stadium, London, in front of a crowd of 51,243.

=== Les Diables Rouges ===
Paddy Dalton was one of the players who successfully toured in France with Salford in 1934, during which the Salford team earned the name "Les Diables Rouges", the seventeen players were; Joe Bradbury, Bob Brown, Aubrey Casewell, Paddy Dalton, Bert Day, Cliff Evans, Jack Feetham, George Harris, Barney Hudson, Emlyn Jenkins, Alf Middleton, Sammy Miller, Harold Osbaldestin, Les Pearson, Gus Risman, Billy Watkins and Billy Williams.

=== International honours ===
Paddy Dalton won caps for England while at Salford in 1934 against Australia and France, in 1935 against France and Wales, and in 1936 against Wales, and represented English League XIII against France.
