= 1938–39 Lancashire Cup =

Sports competition

- Structure: Regional knockout championship
- Teams: 13
- Winners: Wigan
- Runners-up: Salford

1938–39 was the thirty-first occasion on which the Lancashire Cup completion was held. Wigan won the trophy by beating Salford by a score of 10-7. The match was played at Station Road, Pendlebury, Salford, (historically in the county of Lancashire). The attendance was 27,940 and receipts were £1,708.

== Background ==
The number of teams entering this year's competition remained the same at 13, and the same fixture format was retained. There was once again one bye and one "blank" or "dummy" fixture in the first round. The bye in the second round remained.

== Competition and results ==
=== Round 1 ===
Round 1 involved six matches (with one bye and one "blank" fixture) and 13 clubs.

Game no.	Fixture date	Home team	Score	Away team	Venue	Att	Rec	Notes	Ref
1	Sat 10 Sep 1938	Salford	8-4	Broughton Rangers	The Willows				
2	Sat 10 Sep 1938	St Helens Recs	12-7	Barrow	City Road				
3	Sat 10 Sep 1938	Rochdale Hornets	5-19	Widnes	Athletic Grounds				
4	Sat 10 Sep 1938	Leigh	8-24	Warrington	Mather Lane				
5	Sat 10 Sep 1938	Wigan	12-8	Swinton	Central Park				
6	Mon 12 Sep 1938	St. Helens	5-10	Liverpool Stanley	Knowsley Road				
7		Oldham		bye					
8		blank		blank					

=== Round 2 – quarterfinals ===
Round 2's quarterfinals involved three matches (with one bye) and seven clubs.

Game no.	Fixture date	Home team	Score	Away team	Venue	Att	Rec	Notes	Ref
1	Wed 21 Sep 1938	Oldham	4-13	Wigan	Watersheddings				
2	Wed 21 Sep 1938	St Helens Recs	8-10	Liverpool Stanley	City Road				
3	Wed 21 Sep 1938	Warrington	5-4	Widnes	Wilderspool				
4		Salford		bye					

=== Round 3 – semifinals ===
Round 3's semifinals involved two matches and four clubs.

Game no.	Fixture date	Home team	Score	Away team	Venue	Att	Rec	Notes	Ref
1	Wed 28 Sep 1938	Wigan	13-9	Liverpool Stanley	Central Park				
2	Thu 29 Sep 1938	Warrington	6-12	Salford	Wilderspool				

=== Final ===
Game no.	Fixture date	Home team	Score	Away team	Venue	Att	Rec	Notes	Ref
	Saturday 22 October 1938	Wigan	10-7	Salford	Station Road	27,940	£1,708	1	

==== Teams and scorers ====
Wigan	No.	Salford
	Teams	
Jim Sullivan	1	Harold Osbaldestin
Jack Morley	2	Barney Hudson
Ted Ward	3	Albert Gear
Gwynne Davies	4	Bob Brown
Gwyn Williams	5	Alan Edwards
Jack Garvey	6	Gus Risman
Hector Gee	7	Billy Watkins
George Banks	8	David Davies
Joe Egan	9	Bert Day
Ken Gee	10	Joe Bradbury
Ike Jones	11	Paddy Dalton
Trevor Thomas	12	Harold Thomas
Jackie Bowen	13	Jack Feetham
10	Score	7
4	HT	2
	Scorers	
	Tries	
	Goals	
Jim Sullivan (5)	G	
	G	
	Drop goals	
	DG	
Referee		

Scoring - Try = three (3) points - Goal = two (2) points - Drop goal = two (2) points

=== The road to success ===
First round
Oldham
bye
Wigan	12
Swinton	8
St Helens Recs	12
Barrow	7
St. Helens	5
Liverpool Stanley	10
Leigh	8
Warrington	24
Rochdale Hornets	5
Widnes	19
Salford	8
Broughton Rangers	4
blank
blank

Second round
Oldham	4
Wigan	13
St Helens Recs	8
Liverpool Stanley	10
Warrington	5
Widnes	4
Salford
bye

Semifinals
Wigan	13
Liverpool Stanley	9
Warrington	6
Salford	12

Final
Wigan	10
Salford	7

== See also ==
- 1938–39 Northern Rugby Football League season
- Rugby league county cups
