= 1934–35 Lancashire Cup =

- Structure: Regional knockout championship
- Teams: 13
- Winners: Salford
- Runners-up: Wigan

The 1934–35 Lancashire Cup was the 27th occasion on which the Lancashire Cup competition had been held. Salford won the trophy by beating Wigan by 21–12 in the final.

== Competition and results ==
The number of teams entering this year's competition remained at 13 and the same fixture format was retained. There was only one bye in the first round but now also a "blank" or "dummy" fixture. This also resulted in one bye in the second round.

=== Round 1 ===
Involved 6 matches (with one bye and one "blank" fixture) and 13 clubs

Game No	Fixture date	Home team	Score	Away team	Venue	Att	Rec	Notes	Ref
1	Sat 08 Sep 1934	Oldham	8–7	Widnes	Watersheddings				
2	Sat 08 Sep 1934	St Helens Recs	8–20	Wigan	City Road				
3	Sat 08 Sep 1934	Liverpool Stanley	9–3	Broughton Rangers	Stanley Greyhound Stadium			1	
4	Sat 08 Sep 1934	Salford	34–0	Leigh	The Willows				
5	Sat 08 Sep 1934	Swinton	16–8	Barrow	Station Road				
6	Mon 10 Sep 1934	St. Helens	24–18	Rochdale Hornets	Knowsley Road				
7		Warrington		bye					
8		blank		blank					

=== Round 2 – quarterfinals ===
Involved 3 matches (with one bye) and 7 clubs

Game No	Fixture date	Home team	Score	Away team	Venue	Att	Rec	Notes	Ref
1	Wed 19 Sep 1934	Warrington	5–23	Salford	Wilderspool				
2	Mon 24 Sep 1934	St. Helens	9–9	Liverpool Stanley	Knowsley Road				
3	Tue 25 Sep 1934	Oldham	8–12	Wigan	Watersheddings				
4		Swinton		bye	Station Road				

=== Round 2 – quarterfinals – First replays ===
Involved 1 match

Game No	Fixture date	Home team	Score	Away team	Venue	Att	Rec	Notes	Ref
1	Wed 26 Sep 1934	Liverpool Stanley	3–3	St. Helens	Stanley Greyhound Stadium				-

=== Round 2 – quarterfinals – Second replays ===
Involved 1 match

Game No	Fixture date	Home team	Score	Away team	Venue	Att	Rec	Notes	Ref
1	Fri 28 Sep 1934	St. Helens	9–12	Liverpool Stanley	Naughton Park			2	-

=== Round 3 – semifinals ===
Involved 2 matches and 4 clubs

Game No	Fixture date	Home team	Score	Away team	Venue	Att	Rec	Notes	Ref
1	Wed 03 Oct 1934	Swinton	5–12	Salford	Station Road				
2	Wed 03 Oct 1934	Wigan	13–10	Liverpool Stanley	Central Park				

=== Final ===
The match was played at Station Road, Pendlebury, Salford, (historically in the county of Lancashire). he attendance of 33,544 was a new record and more than 5,000 more than the previous best recorded in 1931, and receipts were also a record £2,191. This would turn out to be only the first of three consecutive Lancashire Cup finals in which Salford would beat Wigan.

Game No	Fixture date	Home team	Score	Away team	Venue	Att	Rec	Notes	Ref
	Saturday 20 October 1934	Salford	21–12	Wigan	Station Road	33,544	£2,191	3 4	

==== Teams and scorers ====
Salford	No.	Wigan
	Teams	
Harold Osbaldestin	1	Jim Sullivan
Barney Hudson	2	Jack Morley
Sammy Miller	3	Gordon Innes
Gus Risman	4	Gwynne Davies
Bob Brown	5	Alf Ellaby
Emlyn Jenkins	6	George Bennett
Billy Watkins	7	Hector Gee
Billy Williams	8	Bill Targett
Bert Day	9	Joe Golby
Joe Bradbury	10	Harold Edwards
Paddy Dalton	11	Len Mason
Alf Middleton	12	Albert Davis
Jack Feetham	13	Reg Hathway
21	score	12
4	HT	7
	Scorers	
	Tries	
Barney Hudson	T	George Bennett
Emlyn Jenkins	T	Gordon Innes
Alf Middleton	T	
	T	
	Goals	
Gus Risman (6)	G	Jim Sullivan (2)
	G	Hector Gee (1) maybe drop ?
	Drop Goals	
	DG	
Referee		

Scoring – Try = three (3) points – Goal = two (2) points – Drop goal = two (2) points

=== The road to success ===
First round
Swinton	16
Barrow	8
blank
blank
Warrington
bye
Salford	34
Leigh	0
Oldham	8
Widnes	7
St Helens Recs	8
Wigan	20
St. Helens	24
Rochdale Hornets	18
Liverpool Stanley	9
Broughton Rangers	3

Second round
Swinton
bye
Warrington	5
Salford	23
Oldham	8
Wigan	12
St. Helens	9–3–9
Liverpool Stanley	9–3–12

Semifinals
Swinton	5
Salford	12
Wigan	13
Liverpool Stanley	10

Final
Salford	21
Wigan	12

== See also ==
- 1934–35 Northern Rugby Football League season
- Rugby league county cups
