= 1936–37 Northern Rugby Football League season =

1936–37 Rugby Football League season
- League: Northern Rugby Football League Championship
- Teams: 30

RFL Championship
- Champions: Salford
- League Leaders: Salford
- Top point-scorer(s): Jim Sullivan ( Wigan) 258
- Top try-scorer(s): Eric Harris ( Leeds) 40
- Joined League: Newcastle
- Resigned from the League: Acton and Willesden; Streatham and Mitcham

Lancashire League
- Champions: Salford
- League Leaders: Salford

Yorkshire League
- Champions: Leeds
- League Leaders: Leeds

The 1936–37 Rugby Football League season was the 42nd season of rugby league football.

== Season summary ==
Salford won their third Championship after beating Warrington 13-11 in the play-off final. Salford had also finished the regular season as league leaders.

The Challenge Cup winners were Widnes who beat Keighley 18-5 in the final.

Acton and Willesden were replaced by Newcastle. Streatham and Mitcham disbanded after playing 26 matches, its remaining 12 matches were recorded as forfeits to their opponents.

Salford won the Lancashire League, and Leeds won the Yorkshire League. Salford beat Wigan 5–2 to win the Lancashire County Cup, and York beat Wakefield Trinity 9–2 to win the Yorkshire County Cup.

== Championship ==
	Team	Pld	W	D	L	Pts
1	Salford	38	29	3	6	61
2	Warrington	38	28	3	7	59
3	Leeds	38	28	1	9	57
4	Liverpool Stanley	38	26	3	9	55
5	Wigan	38	26	0	12	52
6	Castleford	38	25	2	11	52
7	Hull	38	24	2	12	50
8	Wakefield Trinity	38	23	1	14	47
9	Barrow	38	20	5	13	45
10	St Helens Recs	38	21	2	15	44
11	Huddersfield	38	21	1	16	43
12	Hunslet	38	21	0	17	42
13	Oldham	38	20	1	17	41
14	Halifax	38	19	3	16	41
15	Bradford Northern	38	19	2	17	40
16	Swinton	38	19	2	17	40
17	Broughton Rangers	38	18	3	17	39
18	Keighley	38	19	0	19	38
19	Hull Kingston Rovers	38	17	1	20	35
20	Widnes	38	17	1	20	35
21	Rochdale Hornets	38	15	1	22	31
22	St. Helens	38	13	4	21	30
23	Streatham and Mitcham	38	14	0	24	28*
24	York	38	14	0	24	28
25	Batley	38	12	2	24	26
26	Dewsbury	38	12	1	25	25
27	Bramley	38	10	1	27	21
28	Leigh	38	5	4	29	14
29	Newcastle	38	5	1	32	11
30	Featherstone Rovers	38	5	0	33	10

== Championship play-offs ==
Semi-finals
1	Salford	15
4	Liverpool Stanley	7
2	Warrington	12
3	Leeds	2

Championship final
Salford	13
Warrington	11

=== Final ===
1 May 1937

Salford	13 – 11	Warrington
Tries: Hudson; Goals: Risman (5)		Tries: Cotton; Goals: Holding (2), Shankland, Welsby

Central Park, Wigan
Attendance: 31,500
Referee: F. Peel (Bradford)

Salford	Number	Warrington
	Teams	
Harold Osbaldestin	1	Billy Holding
Barney Hudson	2	Bill Shankland
Albert Gear	3	Dave Brown
Gus Risman	4	Billy Dingsdale
Alan Edwards	5	Griff Jenkins
Emlyn Jenkins	6	Mel de Lloyd
Billy Watkins	7	Jack Goodall
Billy Williams	8	Bill Rankin
Bert Day	9	Dave Cotton
Joe Bradbury	10	Cod Miller
Paddy Dalton	11	Jack Arkwright
Bert Cambridge	12	Eric Welsby
Jack Feetham	13	Bill Chapman
Lance Todd	Coach	Chris Brockbank

== Challenge Cup ==
Widnes beat Keighley 18-5 in the final played at Wembley Stadium in front of a crowd of 47,699.

This was Widnes' second Challenge Cup final win in three Final appearances.

This was Keighley's first, and to date, only Challenge Cup final appearance.

== European Championship ==
The tri-nation tournament was played between November 1936 and April 1937 as single round robin games between England, France and Wales. This was the third Rugby League European Championship, won by Wales.
Match Details

Date	Venue	Home team	Score	Away team
7 Nov 1936	Pontypridd	Wales	3 - 2	England
6 Dec 1936	Paris	France	3 - 9	Wales
10 Apr 1937	Halifax	England	23 - 9	France
