= Cliff Evans (rugby league) =

Welsh former RL coach & professional rugby league footballer

Personal information
- Full name: Clifford Haudel Evans
- Born: 14 July 1913 Resolven, Wales
- Died: 17 July 1982 (aged 69) Wiltshire, England

Playing information
- Position: Centre, Stand-off, Scrum-half
Club
| Years | Team | Pld | T | G | FG | P |
|---|---|---|---|---|---|---|
| 1933–36 | Salford | 65 | 16 | 4 | 0 | 56 |
| 1936–46 | Leeds | 152 | 21 | 38 | 4 | 147 |
| | Total | 217 | 37 | 42 | 4 | 203 |
Representative
| Years | Team | Pld | T | G | FG | P |
| 1936–41 | Wales | 7 | 1 | 0 | 0 | 3 |

Coaching information
Club
| Years | Team | Gms | W | D | L | W% |
| ≤1954–67 | Swinton |
| 1967–70 | St. Helens |
| 1970–73 | Salford |
| | Total | 0 | 0 | 0 | 0 |

Clifford Haudel "Cliff" Evans (14 July 1913 – July 1982) was a Welsh professional rugby league footballer who played in the 1930s and 1940s, and coached in the 1950s, 1960s and 1970s. He played at representative level for Wales, and at club level for Salford and Leeds, as a centre, stand-off, or scrum-half, and coached at club level for Swinton, St. Helens and Salford.

== Background ==
Cliff Evans was born in Resolven, Glamorgan, and he died aged 69 in Wiltshire.

== Playing career ==
=== Salford ===
Evans made his debut for Salford in October 1933.

Evans was one of the players who successfully toured in France with Salford in 1934, during which the Salford team earned the name "Les Diables Rouges", the seventeen players were; Joe Bradbury, Bob Brown, Aubrey Casewell, Paddy Dalton, Bert Day, Cliff Evans, Jack Feetham, George Harris, Barney Hudson, Emlyn Jenkins, Alf Middleton, Sammy Miller, Harold Osbaldestin, Les Pearson, Gus Risman, Billy Watkins and Billy Williams.

=== Leeds ===
Evans played scrum-half in Leeds' 14-8 victory over Huddersfield in the 1937–38 Yorkshire Cup Final during the 1937–38 season at Belle Vue, Wakefield on Saturday 30 October 1937.

Evans played at centre in Leeds' 19-2 victory over Halifax in the 1940–41 Challenge Cup Final during the 1940–41 season at Odsal Stadium, Bradford, in front of a crowd of 28,500, and played on the wing in the 15-10 victory over Halifax in the 1941–42 Challenge Cup Final during the 1941–42 season at Odsal Stadium, Bradford, in front of a crowd of 15,250.

=== International honours ===
Evans won 7 caps for Wales in 1936–1941 while at Leeds.

== Coaching career ==
=== Swinton ===
Starting in 1954, Evans was the coach in Swinton's victory in the Championship during the 1962–63 season and 1963–64 season.

=== St Helens ===
Evans was the coach in St Helens' 24–12 victory over Leeds in the Championship Final during the 1969–70 season at Odsal, Bradford on Saturday 16 May 1970.

Evans was the coach in St Helens' victory in the Lancashire League during the 1968–69 season.

Evans was the coach in St Helens' 13-10 victory over (following a 2-2 draw with) Warrington in the 1967 Lancashire Cup Final during the 1967–68 season at Station Road, Swinton on Saturday 2 December 1967, was the coach in the 30-2 victory over Oldham in the 1968 Lancashire Cup Final during the 1968–69 season at Central Park, Wigan on Friday 25 October 1968, and was the coach in Salford's 25–11 victory over Swinton in the 1972 Lancashire Cup Final during the 1972–73 season at Wilderspool Stadium, Warrington on Saturday 21 October 1972.

Evans was the coach in St Helens' 4–7 defeat by Wigan in the 1968–69 BBC2 Floodlit Trophy Final at Central Park, Wigan on Tuesday 16 December 1968.
