= William Stead =

William Stead may refer to:

- Bill Stead (1887–1939), English football goalkeeper with Southampton, Aberdeen and Clapton Orient
- W. T. Stead (William Thomas Stead, 1849–1912), English journalist, victim of RMS Titanic disaster
- William Force Stead (1884–1967), American diplomat, poet, Anglican clergyman
- William Stead (rugby league), rugby league footballer of the 1930s and 1940s
- William H. Stead, American politician and lawyer
- Billy Stead, New Zealand rugby union player
- William Stead, American director. Popeye's Revenge is his latest work.
