= John Horan =

John Horan may refer to:

- John Horan (rugby league), rugby league footballer of the 1930s and 1940s
- John Horan (sports administrator) (born 1958), served as 39th president of the GAA between 2018 and 2021
- John Horan (politician) (1908–1971), politician in the Legislative Assembly of Alberta
- John J. Horan (1920–2011), American businessman, CEO and chairman of Merck & Co.
- Johnny Horan (1932–1980), American basketball player
