= Gwyn Williams (rugby) =

Wales international rugby league & union footballer

Personal information
- Full name: Gwyn Williams
- Born: Wales
- Died: unknown

Playing information

Rugby union
Club
Years	Team	Pld	T	G	FG	P
≤1939–39	Cardiff RFC

Rugby league
- Position: Wing, Centre, Second-row
Club
Years	Team	Pld	T	G	FG	P
1938–39	Wigan	32	4			12
Representative
Years	Team	Pld	T	G	FG	P
1939	Wales	1

Gwyn Williams (birth year unknown – death year unknown) was a Welsh rugby union and professional rugby league footballer who played in the 1930s. He played club level rugby union (RU) for Cardiff RFC, and representative level rugby league (RL) for Wales, and at club level for Wigan, as a wing, centre, or second-row.

== Playing career ==
=== International honours ===
Gwyn Williams won a cap for Wales (RL) while at Wigan in 1939.

=== County Cup Final appearances ===
Gwyn Williams played on the wing in Wigan's 10–7 victory over Salford in the 1938–39 Lancashire Cup Final during the 1938–39 season at Station Road, Swinton on Saturday 22 October 1938.
