= Thomas Hardy (rugby league) =

English rugby league footballer

Personal information
- Born: unknown
- Died: unknown

Playing information
- Position: Stand-off
Club
Years	Team	Pld	T	G	FG	P
1935–46	Castleford	186	45	0	0	135
1940–43	→ Wakefield Trinity (guest)	27	8	0	0	24
	Total	213	53	0	0	159
Representative
Years	Team	Pld	T	G	FG	P
1938	Yorkshire	1	0	0	0	0

Thomas Hardy was a professional rugby league footballer who played in the 1930s and 1940s. He played at representative level for Yorkshire, and at club level for Castleford and Wakefield Trinity (World War II guest), as a stand-off.

== Playing career ==
=== County honours ===
Thomas Hardy won a cap playing Stand-off for Yorkshire while at Castleford in the 10-10 draw with Lancashire at Leeds' stadium on 26 October 1938.

=== County League appearances ===
Thomas Hardy played in Castleford's victory in the Yorkshire League during the 1938–39 season.
