= Les Pearson (rugby league) =

English rugby league footballer

Personal information
- Full name: Leslie Pearson

Playing information
- Position: Wing
Club
Years	Team	Pld	T	G	FG	P
1933–45	Salford	51	16	10	0	68
1944(guest)	→Oldham	1	0	0	0	0
	Total	52	16	10	0	68

Leslie "Les" Pearson was an English professional rugby league footballer who played in the 1930s. He played at club level for Salford and Oldham RLFC as a wartime guest player, as a wing.

== Playing career ==
=== Salford ===
Pearson made his debut for Salford in October 1933.

Les Pearson was one of the players who successfully toured in France with Salford in 1934, during which the Salford team earned the name "Les Diables Rouges", the seventeen players were; Joe Bradbury, Bob Brown, Aubrey Casewell, Paddy Dalton, Bert Day, Cliff Evans, Jack Feetham, George Harris, Barney Hudson, Emlyn Jenkins, Alf Middleton, Sammy Miller, Harold Osbaldestin, Les Pearson, Gus Risman, Billy Watkins and Billy Williams.

Pearson played right wing in Salford's 3–15 defeat by Wigan in the Championship Final during the 1933–34 season at Wilderspool, Warrington on Saturday 28 April 1934.
