= Bert Cambridge =

England international rugby league footballer

Personal information
- Full name: Herbert Cambridge

Playing information
- Position: Second-row
Club
Years	Team	Pld	T	G	FG	P
≤1935–36	Broughton Rangers
1936–38	Salford
	Dewsbury
	Total	0	0	0	0	0
Representative
Years	Team	Pld	T	G	FG	P
1935	England	1	0	0	0	0

Herbert "Bert" Cambridge was an English professional rugby league footballer who played in the 1930s. He played at representative level for England, and at club level for Broughton Rangers, as a second-row.

== Club career ==
Cambridge was transferred from Broughton Rangers to Salford in December 1936. He played in Salford's 1936–37 Championship final victory against Warrington. In October 1938, he was signed by Dewsbury.

== International honours ==
Bert Cambridge won a cap for England while at Broughton Rangers in 1935 against France.
