= John Horan (rugby league) =

English rugby league footballer

Playing information
Club
Years	Team	Pld	T	G	FG	P
1938–40	Castleford	6	2	0	0	6

John Horan was a professional rugby league footballer who played in the 1930s and 1940s. He played at club level for Castleford.

== Playing career ==
=== County League appearances ===
John Horan played in Castleford's victory in the Yorkshire League during the 1938–39 season.
