= William Stead (rugby league) =

English rugby league footballer

Personal information
- Full name: William H. Stead
- Born: c. 1913; Hull, England
- Died: 3 January 1969 (aged 56); Hull, England

Playing information
- Position: Prop
Club
Years	Team	Pld	T	G	FG	P
	Hull
1937–46	Castleford	73	9	0	0	27
	Total	73	9	0	0	27
Representative
Years	Team	Pld	T	G	FG	P
1935	Yorkshire	2	0	0	0	0

William Stead (c. 1913 – 3 January 1969) was a professional rugby league footballer who played in the 1930s and 1940s. He played at club level for Castleford.

== Playing career ==
Stead was transferred from Hull to Castleford in October 1937.

Stead played in Castleford's victory in the Yorkshire League during the 1938–39.
