= 1936–37 Lancashire Cup =

- Structure: Regional knockout championship
- Teams: 14
- Winners: Salford
- Runners-up: Wigan

The 1936–37 Lancashire Cup was the twenty-ninth occasion on which the Lancashire Cup competition was held.

Salford won the trophy by beating Wigan by 5–2. The match was played at Wilderspool, Warrington, now in the County Palatine of Chester but (historically in the county of Lancashire. The attendance was 17,500 and receipts were £1,160. This was the third of the three consecutive Lancashire Cup finals in which Salford beat Wigan.

== Background ==
The number of teams entering this year's competition remained the same, with Streatham & Mitcham (hardly a Lancashire club, but useful to make the numbers up) playing in their second (and what was to be their final) season. The total entrants remained at 14 and the same fixture format was retained.

There was no need for a bye in the first round, but there was still a "blank" or "dummy" fixture. The bye in the second round remained.

== Competition and results ==
=== Round 1 ===
Round 1 involved seven matches (with one "blank" fixture) and 14 clubs.

Game no.	Fixture date	Home team	Score	Away team	Venue	Att	Rec	Notes	Ref
1	Sat 12 Sep 1936	Broughton Rangers	17–12	Widnes	Belle Vue Stadium			1	
2	Sat 12 Sep 1936	St Helens Recs	7–7	Leigh	City Road				
3	Sat 12 Sep 1936	Liverpool Stanley	3–14	St. Helens	Stanley Greyhound Stadium				
4	Sat 12 Sep 1936	Salford	8–4	Oldham	The Willows				
5	Sat 12 Sep 1936	Streatham & Mitcham	8–23	Barrow	Mitcham Stadium			2	
6	Sat 12 Sep 1936	Swinton	15–0	Rochdale Hornets	Station Road				
7	Sat 12 Sep 1936	Warrington	6–7	Wigan	Wilderspool				
8		blank		blank					

=== Round 1 – replays ===
Round 1 replays involved one match.

Game no.	Fixture date	Home team	Score	Away team	Venue	Att	Rec	Notes	Ref
1	Wed 16 Sep 1936	Leigh	4–8	St Helens Recs	Mather Lane				

=== Round 2 – quarterfinals ===
Round 2 involved three matches (with one bye) and seven clubs.

Game no.	Fixture date	Home team	Score	Away team	Venue	Att	Rec	Notes	Ref
1	Wed 23 Sep 1936	St Helens Recs	10–4	St. Helens	City Road				
2	Wed 23 Sep 1936	Salford	11–3	Swinton	The Willows				
3	Thu 24 Sep 1936	Barrow	9–8	Broughton Rangers	Craven Park				
4		Wigan		bye					

=== Round 3 – semifinals ===
Round 3 semifinals involved two matches and four clubs.

Game no.	Fixture date	Home team	Score	Away team	Venue	Att	Rec	Notes	Ref
1	Wed 30 Sep 1936	Salford	15–15	Barrow	The Willows				
2	Wed 30 Sep 1936	Wigan	15–2	St Helens Recs	Central Park				

=== Semifinals – first replays ===
Semifinals replays involved one match.

Game no.	Fixture date	Home team	Score	Away team	Venue	Att	Rec	Notes	Ref
1	Thu 8 Oct 1936	Barrow	13–19	Salford	Craven Park				

=== Final ===
Game no.	Fixture date	Home team	Score	Away team	Venue	Att	Rec	Notes	Ref
	Saturday 17 October 1936	Salford	5–2	Wigan	Wilderspool	17,500	£1,160	3	

==== Teams and scorers ====
Salford	No.	Wigan
	Teams	
Harold Osbaldestin	1	Jim Sullivan
Bob Brown	2	Jack Morley
Sammy Miller	3	Gordon Innes
Gus Risman	4	Gwynne Davies
Alan Edwards	5	Charlie Banfield
Emlyn Jenkins	6	George Bennett
Billy Watkins	7	Hector Gee
Billy Williams	8	Francis Gregory
Bert Day	9	Joe Golby
Joe Bradbury	10	Harold Edwards
Paddy Dalton	11	Trevor Thomas
George Harris	12	George Kershaw
Jack Feetham	13	Charlie Seeling Jr.
5	score	2
3	HT	0
	Scorers	
	Tries	
Harold Osbaldestin	T	
	Goals	
Gus Risman	G	Jim Sullivan (1)
	Drop goals	
	DG	
Referee		

Scoring – Try = three (3) points – Goal = two (2) points – Drop goal = two (2) points

=== The road to success ===
First round
Salford	8
Oldham	4
Swinton	15
Rochdale Hornets	0
Streatham & Mitcham	8
Barrow	23
Broughton Rangers	17
Widnes	12
St Helens Recs	7–8
Leigh	7–4
Liverpool Stanley	3
St. Helens	14
Warrington	6
Wigan	7
blank
blank

Second round
Salford	11
Swinton	3
Barrow	9
Broughton Rangers	8
St Helens Recs	10
St. Helens	4
Wigan
bye

Semifinals
Salford	15–19
Barrow	15–13
Wigan	15
St Helens Recs	2

Final
Salford	5
Wigan	2

== See also ==
- 1936–37 Northern Rugby Football League season
- Rugby league county cups
