= Charles Rees (rugby league) =

Wales international rugby league footballer

Personal information
- Full name: Charles Rees
- Born: Wales
- Died: unknown

Playing information
- Position: Forward
Club
Years	Team	Pld	T	G	FG	P
1909–17	Salford	163	21	0	0	63
Representative
Years	Team	Pld	T	G	FG	P
1912	Wales	2

Charles "Charlie" Rees (birth unknown – death unknown) was a Welsh professional rugby league footballer who played in the 1900s and 1910s. He played at representative level for Wales, and at club level for Salford, as a forward.

== Playing career ==
=== International honours ===
Charlie Rees won caps for Wales while at Salford in 1912.

=== Championship final appearances ===
During Charles Rees' time there was Salford's 5–3 victory over Huddersfield in the Championship Final during the 1913–14 season.
