= Gus Risman =

GB & Wales international rugby league footballer and coach (1911–1994)

Personal information
- Full name: Augustus John Ferdinand Risman
- Born: 21 March 1911 Cardiff, Glamorgan, Wales
- Died: 17 October 1994 (aged 83) Whitehaven, England

Playing information
- Position: Fullback, Centre, Stand-off
Club
Years	Team	Pld	T	G	FG	P
1929–46	Salford	427	143	789		2007
(guest)	→ Leeds	12	6	27	0	72
(guest)	Bradford Northern	9	4	3	0	18
(guest)	→ Hunslet	2	0	1	0	2
(guest)	→ Dewsbury	31	15	55	0	155
1946–54	Workington Town	301	33	716	0	1531
1954	Batley	9	0	20	0	40
	Total	791	201	1611	0	3825
Representative
Years	Team	Pld	T	G	FG	P
1933	Northern RL	1	0	2	0	4
1930–31	Glamorgan	3	2	0	0	6
1931–45	Wales	18	5	6	0	27
1932–46	Great Britain	18	2	12	0	30

Coaching information
Club
Years	Team	Gms	W	D	L	W%
1946–54	Workington Town
	Whitehaven
	Oldham
1954–58	Salford
1964–67	Bradford Northern
	Total	0	0	0	0
- Relatives: Bev Risman (son); John Risman (son)

Augustus "Gus" John Ferdinand Risman (21 March 1911 – 17 October 1994) was a Welsh professional rugby league footballer who played in the 1920s through to the 1950s, and coached in the 1940s through to the 1970s.

A devastating three-quarter who also played at fullback, and stand-off, Risman was born in Cardiff, brought up in Barry where he went to Barry County School, and played rugby union in South Wales as a schoolboy before being offered a trial by Salford.

He made his début for Salford on 31 August 1929 and went on to enjoy great success with the club. He won 17 caps for Great Britain and finished his career at Workington Town, remarkably leading them to Rugby League Challenge Cup glory as player-coach at the age of 41 in 1952. He retired as a player in 1954 after a career spanning 25 years. Risman captained the 1946 Great Britain Lions tour of Australia's "Indomitable"s side.

Risman later coached Whitehaven, Oldham and Bradford Northern, and was inducted into the Rugby League Hall of Fame in 1988. Gus Risman's son, Bev Risman also became an accomplished rugby league footballer. As a tribute, one of the newly created streets in Workington's regenerated town centre is named Risman Place.

== Playing career ==
During the period before signing for Salford, Gus Risman was also courted by association football clubs. Tottenham Hotspur offered Risman terms. However, in those days football did not have the huge initial gravitas it enjoys today. During the 1920s, signing for a rugby league club was more financially rewarding. Signing-on fees were restricted or capped in football, whereas in rugby league such fees could be a year's worth of work and playing wages combined.

=== Les Diables Rouges ===
Gus Risman was one of the players who successfully toured in France with Salford in 1934, during which the Salford team earned the name "Les Diables Rouges", the seventeen players were; Joe Bradbury, Bob Brown, Aubrey Casewell, Paddy Dalton, Bert Day, Cliff Evans, Jack Feetham, George Harris, Barney Hudson, Emlyn Jenkins, Alf Middleton, Sammy Miller, Harold Osbaldestin, Les Pearson, Gus Risman, Billy Watkins and Billy Williams.

=== International honours ===
Gus Risman won 18 caps for Wales while at Salford between 1931 and 1945. He was also capped 18 times by Great Britain while at Salford in 1932 against Australia, New Zealand (3 matches), in 1933 against Australia (3 matches), in 1934 against France, in 1936 against Australia (2 matches), New Zealand (2 matches), in 1937 against Australia (3 matches), and in 1946 against Australia (3 matches).

=== Championship final appearances ===
Gus Risman played left centre in Salford's 3–15 defeat by Wigan in the Championship Final during the 1933–34 season at Wilderspool Stadium, Warrington on 28 April 1934.

=== Challenge Cup Final appearances ===
Gus Risman played right wing and scored two-goals in Salford's 7–4 victory over Barrow in the 1938 Challenge Cup Final at Wembley Stadium, London, in front of a crowd of 51,243. He won the Cup with Leeds in 1942, scoring two-goals in their 15–10 victory over Halifax, and played fullback, was the captain, and scored three-goals in Workington Town's 18–10 victory over Featherstone Rovers in the 1951–52 Challenge Cup Final at Wembley on 19 April 1952, in front of a crowd of 72,093.

=== County Cup Final appearances ===
About Gus Risman's time, there was Salford's 2–15 defeat by Warrington in the 1929 Lancashire Cup Final at Central Park, Wigan on 23 November 1929, the 10–8 victory over Swinton in the 1931 Lancashire Cup Final at The Cliff, Broughton, Salford on 21 November 1931, the 21–12 victory over Wigan in the 1934 Lancashire Cup Final at Station Road, Swinton on 20 October 1934, the 15–7 victory over Wigan in the 1935 Lancashire Cup Final at Wilderspool, Warrington on 19 October 1935, the 5–2 victory over Wigan in the 1936 Lancashire Cup Final at Wilderspool, Warrington on 17 October 1936, and played stand-off in the 7–10 defeat by Wigan in the 1938 Lancashire Cup Final Station Road, Swinton on 22 October 1938.

=== Other notable matches ===
Gus Risman played centre for a Rugby League XIII against Northern Command XIII at Thrum Hall, Halifax on 21 March 1942. Despite turning professional, Risman was part of the 1945 British Empire Forces rugby union team that played France, during a period when the strict guideline between amateur and professional were relaxed. Risman, playing at centre, scored two tries and three conversions in that game helping the British to a 27–6 victory.

=== Career records ===
Gus Risman holds Workington Town's "Appearances in a Season" record (with 45-appearances in the 1953–54 season), and as of 2015, with 4,050-points is fourth on British rugby league's "most points in a career" record list behind Neil Fox, Jim Sullivan and Kevin Sinfield.

Gus Risman is one of less than ten Welshmen to have scored more than 2,000-points in their rugby league career, and is one of less than twenty Welshmen to have scored more than 200-tries in their rugby league career.

== Coaching career ==
Risman was appointed as coach of Bradford Northern in October 1964. Despite a relatively successful 5th place finish in the 1966–67 season, Risman was replaced as coach by Albert Fearnley.

== Personal life ==
Gus Risman was the father of the rugby league footballers Bev Risman and John Risman.

== Honours ==
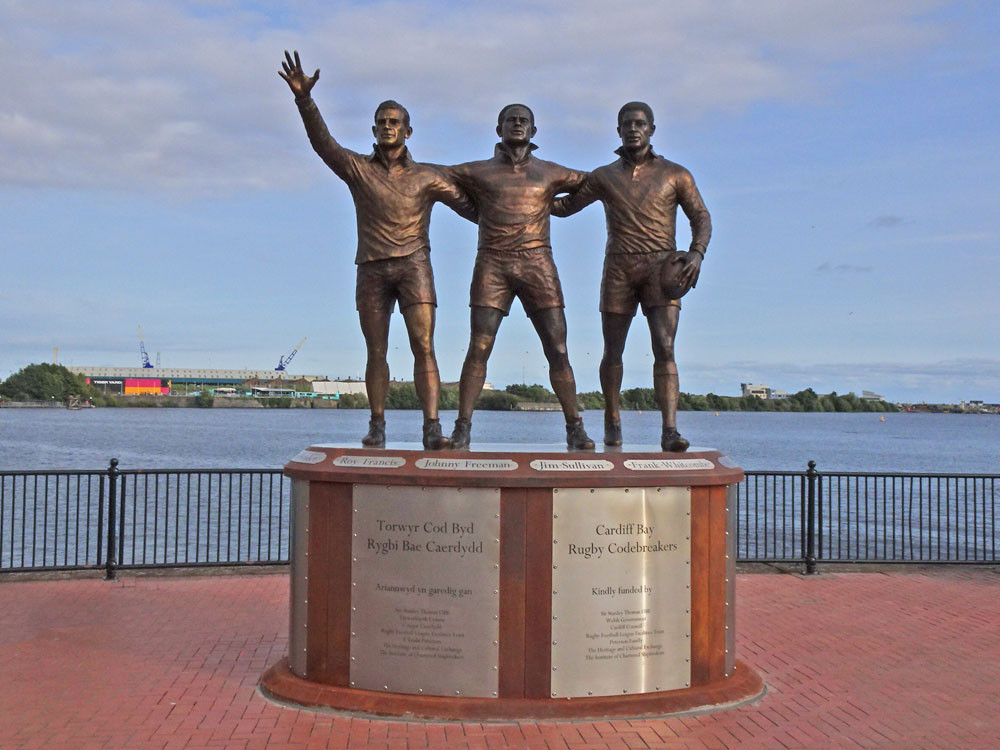
Risman was honoured in the Cardiff Bay Rugby Codebreakers statue, together with Billy Boston (centre) and Clive Sullivan (right)

Risman Place in Workington is named after him. while Risman House at Workington Academy is also named for him. In December 2020 Risman was named as one of three Welsh rugby league players to be honoured with a new statue in Cardiff Bay, the other two being Billy Boston and Clive Sullivan. The statue was unveiled in July 2023.
