= Stewart Williams (rugby league) =

English rugby league footballer

Personal information
- Born: c. 1958 (age 67–68) Salford, England

Playing information
- Position: Second-row, Loose forward
Club
Years	Team	Pld	T	G	FG	P
1977–85	Salford	223	60	0	0	197
1985	→ Wigan (loan)	3	0	0	0	0
1985–89	Barrow	115	27
1989–90	Chorley Borough	16
	Total	357	87	0	0	197

Stewart Williams (born c. 1958) is an English former rugby league footballer who played in the 1970s, 1980s and 1990s. He played at club level for Salford, Wigan (loan), Barrow and Chorley Borough, as a second-row or loose forward.

== Playing career ==
Stewart Williams was born in Salford, Lancashire, England.

=== Club career ===
Stewart Williams made his début for Wigan in the 6–36 defeat by Bradford Northern at Odsal Stadium, Bradford on 2 April 1985, and he played his last match for Wigan as an Interchange/substitute in the 28–19 victory over Oldham at the Watersheddings, Oldham on 8 April 1985.
