= Billy Williams (rugby, born 1905) =

Welsh RL coach and former GB & Wales international dual-code rugby footballer

Personal information
- Full name: William Arthur Williams
- Born: 29 December 1905 Crumlin, Monmouthshire, Wales
- Died: 4 November 1973 (aged 67) Manchester, England

Playing information

Rugby union
- Position: Flanker
Club
| Years | Team | Pld | T | G | FG | P |
|---|---|---|---|---|---|---|
| | Cross Keys RFC |
| | Crumlin RFC |
| | Total | 0 | 0 | 0 | 0 | 0 |
Representative
| Years | Team | Pld | T | G | FG | P |
| 1927 | Wales | 4 | 0 | 0 | 0 | 0 |

Rugby league
- Position: Prop, Second-row
Club
| Years | Team | Pld | T | G | FG | P |
|---|---|---|---|---|---|---|
| 1927–38 | Salford | 425 | | | | 42 |
Representative
| Years | Team | Pld | T | G | FG | P |
| 1930 | Other Nationalities | 1 | 0 | 0 | 0 | 0 |
| 1930–33 | Wales | 3 | 0 | 0 | 0 | 0 |
| 1930–32 | Great Britain | 2 | 0 | 0 | 0 | 0 |

William Arthur Williams (29 December 1905 – 4 November 1973) was a Welsh dual-code international rugby union, and professional rugby league footballer who played in the 1920s and 1930s. He played representative level rugby union for Wales, and at club level for Crumlin and Cross Keys as a flanker, and representative level rugby league for Great Britain and Wales, and at club level for Salford (captain), as a prop, or second-row.

== Background ==
Billy Williams was born in Crumlin, Monmouthshire, and he died aged 67 in Manchester, Lancashire, England.

== Rugby career ==
=== Rugby union ===
Williams first came to note as a rugby player when he represented rugby union team Cross Keys. By the time he was selected for international duty, he was playing for unfashionable lower league team Crumlin. The fact that Williams was, and still is, the only player to be selected for international duty directly from the club is an indicator to the talent he showed as a flanker. Williams played in four union internationals, all of them part of the 1927 Five Nations Championship. His first encounter was against England, played away at Twickenham. The game ended with a 9–11 loss, and despite the result Williams was re-selected for the next three games. Wales ended the Championship with just one win, a home match against France. It is unknown if Williams would have been selected the next season as in 1927 he switched to professional league club Salford. By switching to a professional club, Williams was not only banned from playing union again for life, but also had his union international cap withheld.

In 1975, his Wales rugby union cap was awarded to him posthumously under an 'amnesty'.

=== Rugby league ===
Williams played his first league game for Salford on 15 October 1927, and won three Championship and one Challenge Cup winners medals with the club over his career. On 15 January 1930, Williams was selected for the Great Britain team, to face a touring Australia side. Just three days later he won his first Wales league cap, in a match against the same touring Australians at Wembley. He won two more caps for Wales, a 1932 encounter with England and a 1933 match against Australia. In-between his Welsh caps, Williams also toured Australia with Great Britain in 1932. He played in 15 games of the tour and one Test against Australia.

Billy Williams was one of the players who successfully toured in France with Salford in 1934, during which the Salford team earned the name "Les Diables Rouges", the seventeen players were; Joe Bradbury, Bob Brown, Aubrey Casewell, Paddy Dalton, Bert Day, Cliff Evans, Jack Feetham, George Harris, Barney Hudson, Emlyn Jenkins, Alf Middleton, Sammy Miller, Harold Osbaldestin, Les Pearson, Gus Risman, Billy Watkins, and Billy Williams.

Billy Watkins played at prop in Salford's 7–4 victory over Barrow in the 1938 Challenge Cup Final at Wembley Stadium, London, in front of a crowd of 51,243.

About Billy Williams' time, there was Salford's 2–15 defeat by Warrington in the 1929 Lancashire Cup Final at Central Park, Wigan on Saturday 23 November 1929, the 10–8 victory over Swinton in the 1931 Lancashire Cup Final at The Cliff, Broughton, Salford on Saturday 21 November 1931, the 21–12 victory over Wigan in the 1934 Lancashire Cup Final at Station Road, Swinton on Saturday 20 October 1934, the 15–7 victory over Wigan in the 1935 Lancashire Cup Final at Wilderspool Stadium, Warrington on Saturday 19 October 1935, the 5–2 victory over Wigan in the 1936 Lancashire Cup Final at Wilderspool Stadium, Warrington on Saturday 17 October 1936.

== Bibliography ==
- Gate, Robert (1986). Gone North: Volume 1. Ripponden: R.E. Gate. ISBN 0-9511190-0-1.
- Jenkins, John M.; et al. (1991). Who's Who of Welsh International Rugby Players. Wrexham: Bridge Books. ISBN 1-872424-10-4.
