= 1938–39 Northern Rugby Football League season =

- League: Northern Rugby Football League
- Teams: 28
- Champions: Salford
- League Leaders: Salford
- Top point-scorer(s): Gus Risman 267
- Top try-scorer(s): Ray Markham 39

The 1938–39 Rugby Football League season was the 44th season of rugby league football.

== Season summary ==
Salford won their fourth Championship when they defeated Castleford 8–6 in the play-off final. Salford had also ended the regular season as league leaders.

The Challenge Cup Winners were Halifax who defeated Salford 20–3 in the final.

Newcastle dropped out of the competition.

Salford won the Lancashire League, and Castleford won the Yorkshire League. Wigan beat Salford 10–7 to win the Lancashire County Cup, and Huddersfield beat Hull F.C. 18–10 to win the Yorkshire County Cup.

== Championship ==
	Team	Pld	W	D	L	Pts
1	Salford	40	30	3	7	63
2	Castleford	40	29	3	8	61
3	Halifax	40	28	3	9	59
4	Huddersfield	40	28	2	10	58
5	Leeds	40	25	4	11	54
6	Swinton	40	26	1	13	53
7	Warrington	40	26	0	14	52
8	Barrow	40	24	3	13	51
9	Wigan	40	25	0	15	50
10	Widnes	40	22	3	15	47
11	Wakefield Trinity	40	20	5	15	45
12	Hull	40	21	3	16	45
13	Keighley	40	21	1	18	43
14	Oldham	40	20	2	18	42
15	Hunslet	40	19	4	17	42
16	Bradford Northern	40	19	1	20	39
17	Hull Kingston Rovers	40	18	3	19	39
18	York	40	18	2	20	38
19	Liverpool Stanley	40	18	1	21	37
20	Broughton Rangers	40	18	1	21	37
21	St. Helens	40	17	0	23	34
22	Featherstone Rovers	40	13	2	25	28
23	Batley	40	11	1	28	23
24	St Helens Recs	40	11	0	29	22
25	Bramley	40	8	5	27	21
26	Leigh	40	7	3	30	17
27	Dewsbury	40	5	2	33	12
28	Rochdale Hornets	40	4	0	36	8

== Championship play-offs ==
Semi-finals
1	Salford	15
4	Huddersfield	0
2	Castleford	21
3	Halifax	4

Championship final
Salford	8
Castleford	6

=== Final ===
13 May 1939

Salford	8 – 6	Castleford
Tries: Edwards, Kenny; Goals: Risman		Tries: Robinson, Brindle

Maine Road, Manchester
Attendance: 69,504
Referee: S. Adams (Hull)

Salford	Number	Castleford
	Teams	
Sammy Miller	1	George Lewis
Barney Hudson	2	Bernard Cunniffe
Albert Gear	3	Jimmy Robinson
Gus Risman	4	Jim Croston
Alan Edwards	5	Reg Lloyd
Tom Kenny	6	Tom Hardy
Billy Watkins	7	Les Adams
Dai Davies	8	William Stead
Bert Day	9	Harold Haley
Joe Bradbury	10	Tommy Taylor
Paddy Dalton	11	John Horan
Harold Thomas	12	Ted Sadler
Jack Feetham	13	Fred Brindle
Lance Todd	Coach	Billy Rhodes

== Challenge Cup ==
Halifax beat Salford 20–3 in the final played at Wembley on Saturday 6 May 1939 in front of a crowd of 55,453. There would be no Challenge Cup competition in 1939–40.

This was Halifax’s fourth Cup Final win in five Final appearances.

This was Salford’s fifth Final appearance and second in consecutive years, having won the Cup the previous season

== European Championship ==
The tri-nation tournament was played between November 1938 and April 1939 as single round robin games between England, France and Wales. This was the fourth Rugby League European Championship, and was won by France.
Match details

Date	Venue	Home team	Score	Away team
5 Nov 1938	Llanelli	Wales	17 - 9	England
25 Feb 1939	St Helens	England	9 - 12	France
2 Apr 1938	Bordeaux	France	16 - 10	Wales

== Sources ==
- 1938–39 Rugby Football League season at wigan.rlfans.com
- The Challenge Cup at The Rugby Football League website
