= Jim Sullivan (rugby, born 1903) =

GB & Wales international rugby player (1903–1977)

- Cigarette card featuring Jim Sullivan

Personal information
- Full name: James Sullivan
- Born: 2 December 1903 Cardiff, Wales
- Died: 14 September 1977 (aged 73) Royal Albert Edward Infirmary, Wigan

Playing information

Rugby union
- Position: Fullback
Club
Years	Team	Pld	T	G	FG	P
1920–21	Cardiff RFC	38	1
Representative
Years	Team	Pld	T	G	FG	P
	Barbarians

Rugby league
- Position: Fullback
Club
Years	Team	Pld	T	G	FG	P
1921–46	Wigan	774	83	2317	0	4883
(guest)	→ Dewsbury	27	2	84	0	174
(guest)	→ Keighley	3	0	8	0	16
(guest)	→ Bradford Northern	1	0	5	0	10
	Total	805	85	2414	0	5083
Representative
Years	Team	Pld	T	G	FG	P
1921–39	Wales (tests)	26	3	60	0	129
1924–34	Great Britain	28	0	78	0	156
1937	British Empire XIII	1	0	3	0	6
1924–33	Other Nationalities	6	0	22	0	44
1924–32	GB tour games	37	4	206	0	424
1927–31	Glamorgan	12	2	33	0	72

Coaching information
Club
Years	Team	Gms	W	D	L	W%
1932–52	Wigan
1952–58	St. Helens
1958–61	Rochdale Hornets
1961	Wigan
	Total	0	0	0	0

Jim Sullivan (2 December 1903 – 14 September 1977) was a Welsh rugby league player, and coach. Sullivan joined Wigan in June 1921 after starting his career in rugby union. A right-footed toe-end style (rather than round the corner style) goal-kicking fullback, he scored 4,883 points in a career that spanned 25 years with Wigan, and still holds several records with the club today.

He made a combined total of 60 appearances at representative level with Wales, Great Britain and Other Nationalities, and his 26 appearances with Wales was still a record for many years after his death. He also represented Wales in British baseball. Sullivan went on to have the rare distinction of playing all three codes of baseball played in Britain the inter-war years. He played both Welsh and English baseball before the two codes were unified in 1927 and continued playing baseball in the latter 20s and 30s, primarily for the Everton and St Margarets baseball clubs in Liverpool. In the mid-1930 he also played American baseball for Manchester Blue Sox and Greenfield Giants.

== Early life ==
Sullivan was born at Cardiff, Glamorgan, Wales. He attended St Alban's School, and joined his hometown rugby union team Cardiff at the age of 16. He made his début against Neath in October 1920, and went on to make 38 appearances for the club. In December 1920, 26-days after his seventeenth birthday, he played for the Barbarians in a match against Newport, becoming the youngest player to represent the team. His performances attracted the attention of several rugby league clubs, including Wakefield Trinity, Hull FC, Huddersfield and Wigan. While playing for Cardiff, Sullivan served an apprenticeship to become a boilermaker. He was also a British baseball player, and appeared for Wales in a match against England in 1921.

== Rugby league career ==
In June 1921, Sullivan turned professional and joined rugby league side Wigan, reportedly signing a 12-year contract for a fee of £750. He made his début in August 1921, converting five goals in a 21–0 victory over Widnes. He made his first representative appearance in December 1921, playing for Wales in a 16–21 defeat against Australia.

Jim Sullivan played fullback, and scored 4-conversions in Wigan's 13-2 victory over Oldham in the Championship Final during the 1921–22 season at The Cliff, Broughton on Saturday 6 May 1922, played fullback, and scored 4-conversions in the 22-10 victory over Warrington in the Championship Final during the 1925–26 season at Knowsley Road, St. Helens on Saturday 8 May 1926. played fullback, and scored 2-conversions, and a drop goal in Wigan's 15–3 victory over Salford in the Championship Final during the 1933–34 season at Wilderspool Stadium, Warrington on Saturday 28 April 1934, and played fullback in the 12–5 victory over Dewsbury in the Championship Final second-leg during the 1943–44 season at Crown Flatt, Dewsbury on Saturday 20 May 1944 (Joe Jones having played fullback in the first-leg).

Jim Sullivan played fullback, and scored 4 conversions in Wigan's 20–2 victory over Leigh in the 1922–23 Lancashire Cup Final at the Willows in Weaste, Salford on Saturday 25 November 1922, played fullback, and scored a conversion in the 11–15 defeat by Swinton in the 1925–26 Lancashire Cup Final at The Cliff, Broughton on Wednesday 9 December 1925, played fullback, and scored a conversion in the 2–5 defeat by Swinton in the 1927–28 Lancashire Cup Final at Watersheddings, Oldham on Saturday 19 November 1927, played fullback, and scored a conversion in the 5–4 victory over Widnes in the 1928–29 Lancashire Cup Final the Willows, Salford, on Saturday 24 November 1928, played fullback, and scored 2-conversions in the 12–21 defeat by Salford in the 1934–35 Lancashire Cup Final at Station Road, Swinton, on Saturday 20 October 1934, played fullback, and scored 2-conversions in the 7–15 defeat by Salford in the 1935–36 Lancashire Cup Final at Wilderspool Stadium, Warrington on Saturday 19 October 1935, played fullback, and scored a conversion in the 2–5 defeat by Salford in the 1936–37 Lancashire Cup Final at Wilderspool, Warrington on Saturday 17 October 1936, and played fullback and scored 5-conversions in the 10–7 victory over Salford in the 1938–39 Lancashire Cup Final during the 1938–39 season at Station Road, Swinton on Saturday 22 October 1938.

On 14 February 1925, he landed 22 goals against amateurs Flimby & Fothergill in the Challenge Cup, which is still a record. He toured with the Great Britain Lions three times (1924, 1928 and 1932) and was captain on the last occasion. He top-scored on all three tours. He refused what would have been a record fourth trip, in 1936, for personal reasons.

For twenty years, he dominated at fullback, representing Great Britain (28 times), Wales (26), Other Nationalities (6), British Empire (1), Glamorgan (1) and Glamorgan and Monmouthshire (12). He was Wales' most capped player for over 70 years before his record was surpassed by Ian Watson in 2010. During the Second World War, he played infrequently for Wigan, as he chose to appear as a guest for a number of other clubs, including Dewsbury, Keighley and Bradford Northern. His last season before retiring was in 1945–46 – the season when the peacetime league resumed – and played his last game against Batley in February 1946.

When he removed his Wigan jersey for the last time, he had made 774 appearances and amassed 2,317 goals and 4,883 points for the club. These figures are still unchallenged. He scored a club record of 161 goals in 1934-35 and a record total of 204 goals in 1933-34 (including representative games). He had won three league Championships, two Challenge Cups and three Lancashire Cups.

== Appearance record ==
Sullivan holds the world record for the most first team appearances in the sport of Rugby League. In his 25 year career, Sullivan made 928 first team appearances, a figure unmatched anywhere in the world.

== Coaching career ==
Having been captain-coach at Wigan since 1932, Sullivan continued managing the team after retiring as a player in 1946, creating one of the club's greatest sides by winning a record five championships and a brace of Challenge Cups.

Sullivan was the coach in Wigan's 8-3 victory over Bradford Northern in the 1948–49 Challenge Cup Final at Wembley Stadium, London on Saturday 1 May 1948, in front of a crowd of 91,465.

In 1952 he joined St. Helens, overseeing their rise. Sullivan was the coach in St. Helens' 10–15 defeat by Huddersfield in the 1952-53 Challenge Cup Final at Wembley Stadium, London on Saturday 25 April 1953, in front of a crowd of 89,588, and was the coach in the 13-2 victory over Halifax in the 1955–56 Challenge Cup Final at Wembley Stadium, London on Saturday 28 April 1956, in front of a crowd of 79,341.

Sullivan was the coach in St. Helens' 44–22 victory over Hunslet in the Championship Final during the 1958–59 season at Odsal Stadium, Bradford on Saturday 16 May 1959.

He later returned to Wigan as coach in 1961, but left months later due to ill health.

Jim Sullivan died in the Royal Albert Edward Infirmary, Wigan, on the 14th September 1977 at the age of 73. He was one of the inaugural inductees of the British Rugby League Hall of Fame in October 1988. He is also an inductee of the Wigan Hall of Fame, and the St Helens Hall of Fame.
