= 1931–32 Northern Rugby Football League season =

- League: Championship
- Duration: 38 Rounds
- Teams: 28
- Champions: St. Helens (1st title)
- League Leaders: Huddersfield
- Runners-up: Huddersfield
- Top point-scorer(s): (Wales) Jim Sullivan ( Wigan) (249)
- Top try-scorer(s): (Australia) Ernie Mills ( Huddersfield) (50)

The 1931–32 Rugby Football League season was the 37th season of rugby league football in northern England.

== Season summary ==
St. Helens won their first championship when they defeated Huddersfield 9-5 in the play-off final.

Huddersfield had finished the regular season as league leaders.

The Challenge Cup Winners were Leeds who beat Swinton 11-8 in the final.

St. Helens won the Lancashire League, and Hunslet won the Yorkshire League. Salford beat Swinton 10–8 to win the Lancashire County Cup, and Huddersfield beat Hunslet 4–2 to win the Yorkshire County Cup.

== Championship ==
	Team	Pld	W	D	L	PF	PA	Pts
1	Huddersfield	38	30	1	7	636	368	61
2	St. Helens	38	29	2	7	699	279	60
3	Leeds	38	27	1	10	603	307	55
4	Hunslet	38	27	1	10	672	359	55
5	Salford	38	26	2	10	551	211	54
6	Swinton	38	26	1	11	523	253	53
7	Wigan	38	22	2	14	559	361	46
8	Warrington	38	22	2	14	495	412	46
9	York	38	22	2	14	455	382	46
10	Wakefield Trinity	38	21	3	14	545	388	45
11	Oldham	38	20	2	16	461	437	42
12	Rochdale Hornets	38	19	2	17	458	458	40
13	St Helens Recs	38	18	1	19	523	523	37
14	Hull Kingston Rovers	38	18	0	20	409	413	36
15	Dewsbury	38	17	2	19	421	467	36
16	Halifax	38	17	1	20	432	379	35
17	Batley	38	16	1	21	358	433	33
18	Broughton Rangers	38	16	1	21	351	382	33
19	Featherstone Rovers	38	15	2	21	374	415	32
20	Widnes	38	14	4	20	363	458	32
21	Hull	38	14	3	21	415	461	31
22	Castleford	38	14	1	23	402	515	29
23	Barrow	38	14	1	23	368	560	29
24	Leigh	38	13	2	23	353	487	28
25	Bramley	38	12	1	25	333	751	25
26	Keighley	38	10	0	28	228	630	20
27	Wigan Highfield	38	6	2	30	350	707	14
28	Bradford Northern	38	5	1	32	313	854	11

== Championship play-off ==
Semi-finals
1	Huddersfield	12
4	Hunslet	9
2	St Helens	9
3	Leeds	0

Championship final
Huddersfield	5
St Helens	9

== Challenge Cup ==
Leeds beat Swinton 11-8 in the Challenge Cup Final played at Central Park, Wigan on Saturday 9 April 1932 before a crowd of 29,000.

This was Leeds’ third Cup Final win in as many Cup Final appearances.

== Sources ==
- 1931-32 Rugby Football League season at wigan.rlfans.com
- The Challenge Cup at The Rugby Football League website
