= RFL Lancashire Cup =

Rugby league knockout competition

Lancashire Cup
- Sport: Rugby league
- Instituted: 1905
- Ceased: 1992
- Country: England
- Last winners: Wigan (21st title)
- Most titles: Wigan (21 titles)

The RFL Lancashire Cup, usually referred to as the Lancashire Cup, was a British rugby league football knock-out competition founded in 1905. Organised by the Rugby Football League (RFL), the competition was open to all professional clubs in the Lancashire region, but also included a number of clubs based in Cumbria.

The tournament was held annually and was usually played over four rounds, with the fixtures normally being played during the early part of the season. The tournament was scrapped along with the Yorkshire Cup after the 1992–93 season.

The most successful club was Wigan, who won the trophy on 21 occasions.

== History ==
The competition was introduced in 1905. In 1976, Burtonwood Brewery agreed to sponsor the tournament in a deal worth £4,000 per year. They were replaced as sponsor by Grunhalle Lager (brewed by Greenall Whitley) in 1986.

During the latter years of the competition, clubs complained increasingly about fixture congestion, resulting in the cup being scrapped in 1993.

== Finals ==
The Lancashire Cup was not played during the Second World War (1940–45). During this period the Yorkshire Cup finals of 1942, 1943, and 1944 were played over two legs, with aggregate score being used.

Season	Winner	Score	Runner-up	Venue
1905–06	Wigan	0–0	Leigh	Wheater's Field, Broughton
Replay	Wigan	8–0	Leigh	Wheater's Field, Broughton
1906–07	Broughton Rangers	15–6	Warrington	Central Park, Wigan
1907–08	Oldham	16–9	Broughton Rangers	Athletic Grounds, Rochdale
1908–09	Wigan	10–9	Oldham	Wheater's Field, Broughton
1909–10	Wigan	22–5	Leigh	Wheater's Field, Broughton
1910–11	Oldham	4–3	Swinton	Wheater's Field, Broughton
1911–12	Rochdale Hornets	12–5	Oldham	Wheater's Field, Broughton
1912–13	Wigan	21–5	Rochdale Hornets	The Willows, Salford
1913–14	Oldham	5–0	Wigan	Wheater's Field, Broughton
1914–15	Rochdale Hornets	3–2	Wigan	The Willows, Salford
1918–19	Rochdale Hornets	22–0	Oldham	The Willows, Salford
1919–20	Oldham	7–0	Rochdale Hornets	The Willows, Salford
1920–21	Broughton Rangers	6–3	Leigh	The Willows, Salford
1921–22	Warrington	7–5	Oldham	The Cliff, Broughton
1922–23	Wigan	20–2	Leigh	The Willows, Salford
1923–24	St Helens Recs	17–0	Swinton	
1924–25	Oldham	10–0	St Helens Recs	The Willows, Salford
1925–26	Swinton	15–11	Wigan	The Cliff, Broughton
1926–27	St. Helens	10–2	St Helens Recs	Wilderspool Stadium, Warrington
1927–28	Swinton	5–2	Wigan	Watersheddings, Oldham
1928–29	Wigan	5–4	Widnes	Wilderspool Stadium, Warrington
1929–30	Warrington	15–2	Salford	Central Park, Wigan
1930–31	St Helens Recs	18–3	Wigan	Station Road, Swinton
1931–32	Salford	10–8	Swinton	The Cliff, Broughton
1932–33	Warrington	10–9	St. Helens	Central Park, Wigan
1933–34	Oldham	12–0	St Helens Recs	Station Road, Swinton
1934–35	Salford	21–12	Wigan	Station Road, Swinton
1935–36	Salford	15–7	Wigan	Wilderspool Stadium, Warrington
1936–37	Salford	5–2	Wigan	Wilderspool Stadium, Warrington
1937–38	Warrington	8–4	Barrow	Central Park, Wigan
1938–39	Wigan	10–7	Salford	Station Road, Swinton
1939–40	Swinton	4–5	Widnes	Naughton Park, Widnes
1939–40	Swinton	16–11 (Note: After extra time; full-time score was 9–8 meaning scores were tied 13–13 on aggregate)	Widnes	Station Road, Swinton
1939–40	Swinton won 21–15 on aggregate			
No competition between 1940–41 and 1944–45
1945–46	Widnes	7–3	Wigan	Wilderspool Stadium, Warrington
1946–47	Wigan	9–3	Belle Vue Rangers	Station Road, Swinton
1947–48	Wigan	10–7	Belle Vue Rangers	Wilderspool Stadium, Warrington
1948–49	Wigan	14–8	Warrington	Station Road, Swinton
1949–50	Wigan	20–7	Leigh	Wilderspool Stadium, Warrington
1950–51	Wigan	28–5	Warrington	Station Road, Swinton
1951–52	Wigan	14–6	Leigh	Station Road, Swinton
1952–53	Leigh	22–5	St. Helens	Station Road, Swinton
1953–54	St. Helens	16–8	Wigan	Station Road, Swinton
1954–55	Barrow	12–2	Oldham	Station Road, Swinton
1955–56	Leigh	26–9	Widnes	Central Park, Wigan
1956–57	Oldham	10–3	St. Helens	Central Park, Wigan
1957–58	Oldham	13–8	Wigan	Station Road, Swinton
1958–59	Oldham	12–2	St. Helens	Station Road, Swinton
1959–60	Warrington	5–4	St. Helens	Central Park, Wigan
1960–61	St. Helens	15–9	Swinton	Central Park, Wigan
1961–62	St. Helens	25–9	Swinton	Central Park, Wigan
1962–63	St. Helens	7–4	Swinton	Central Park, Wigan
1963–64	St. Helens	15–4	Leigh	Station Road, Swinton
1964–65	St. Helens	12–4	Swinton	Central Park, Wigan
1965–66	Warrington	16–5	Rochdale Hornets	Knowsley Road, St. Helens
1966–67	Wigan	16–13	Oldham	Station Road, Swinton
1967–68	St. Helens	2–2	Warrington	Central Park, Wigan
Replay	St. Helens	13–10	Warrington	Station Road, Swinton
1968–69	St. Helens	30–2	Oldham	Central Park, Wigan
1969–70	Swinton	11–2	Leigh	Central Park, Wigan
1970–71	Leigh	7–4	St. Helens	Station Road, Swinton
1971–72	Wigan	15–8	Widnes	Knowsley Road, St Helens
1972–73	Salford	25–11	Swinton	Wilderspool Stadium, Warrington
1973–74	Wigan	19–9	Salford	Wilderspool Stadium, Warrington
1974–75	Widnes	6–2	Salford	Central Park, Wigan
1975–76	Widnes	16–7	Salford	Central Park, Wigan
1976–77	Widnes	16–11	Workington Town	Central Park, Wigan
1977–78	Workington Town	16–13	Wigan	Wilderspool Stadium, Warrington
1978–79	Widnes	15–13	Workington Town	Central Park, Wigan
1979–80	Widnes	11–0	Workington Town	The Willows, Salford
1980–81	Warrington	26–10	Wigan	Knowsley Road, St Helens
1981–82	Leigh	8–3	Widnes	Central Park, Wigan
1982–83	Warrington	16–0	St. Helens	Central Park, Wigan
1983–84	Barrow	12–8	Widnes	Central Park, Wigan
1984–85	St. Helens	26–18	Wigan	Central Park, Wigan
1985–86	Wigan	34–8	Warrington	Knowsley Road, St Helens
1986–87	Wigan	27–6	Oldham	Knowsley Road, St Helens
1987–88	Wigan	28–16	Warrington	Knowsley Road, St Helens
1988–89	Wigan	22–17	Salford	Knowsley Road, St Helens
1989–90	Warrington	24–16	Oldham	Knowsley Road, St Helens
1990–91	Widnes	24–18	Salford	Central Park, Wigan
1991–92	St. Helens	24–14	Rochdale Hornets	Wilderspool Stadium, Warrington
1992–93	Wigan	5–4	St. Helens	Knowsley Road, St Helens

=== Wins by club ===
	Club	Wins	Winning years
1	Wigan	21	1905, 1908, 1909, 1912, 1922, 1928, 1938, 1946, 1947, 1948, 1949, 1950, 1951, 1966, 1971, 1973, 1985, 1986, 1987, 1988, 1992
2	St. Helens	11	1926, 1953, 1960, 1961, 1962, 1963, 1964, 1967, 1968, 1984, 1991
3	Warrington	9	1921, 1929, 1932, 1937, 1959, 1965, 1980, 1982, 1989
4	Oldham	9	1907, 1910, 1913, 1919, 1924, 1933, 1956, 1957, 1958
5	Widnes	7	1945, 1974, 1975, 1976, 1978, 1979, 1990
6	Salford	5	1931, 1934, 1935, 1936, 1972
7	Leigh	4	1952, 1955, 1970, 1981
8	Swinton	4	1925, 1927, 1940, 1969
9	Rochdale Hornets	3	1911, 1914, 1918
10	Barrow	2	1954, 1983
11	St Helens Recs	2	1923, 1930
12	Broughton Rangers	2	1906, 1920
13	Workington	1	1977

== Sponsors ==
Years	Sponsor	Name
1976–1985	Burtonwood Brewery	Forshaw's Lancashire Cup
1986–1992	Greenall Whitley	Grunhalle Lager Lancashire Cup

== Records ==
=== Final ===
- Most appearances: 35, Wigan
- Most wins: 21, Wigan
- Highest score: 34–8, Wigan v Warrington 1985
- Biggest winning margin: 28, 30–2, St. Helens v Oldham 1968
- Biggest attendance: 42,795, St. Helens v Wigan at Station Road, Swinton 1953

=== Individual records in the final ===
- Most tries in a final: 4, Brian Nordgren for Wigan v Leigh 1949
- Most goals in a final: 7 (three times), Jim Ledgard for Leigh v Widnes 1955; Steve Hesford for Warrington v Wigan 1980; David Stephenson for Wigan v Warrington 1985
- Most points in a final: 17 Steve Hesford (7 goals and 1 try) for Warrington v Wigan 1980

=== Competition records ===
- Highest score: 112–0, St. Helens v Carlisle 1986

== See also ==
- RFL Lancashire League
