= Rugby league county leagues =

Rugby league

The Yorkshire League and the Lancashire League formed two sections of the Rugby Football League Championship for much of its history. Initially, the 22 clubs that broke away in 1895 played in one combined league; however, the following season saw the addition of many clubs, and the League was split into two separate county competitions.

== History ==
This situation endured until 1901–1902, when the top teams in each league resigned and formed a new combined first division. The following season, the remaining clubs formed a second division. From then until 1907, when there was another re-organisation, the county leagues were not played.

The new structure initiated for the 1907–1908 season saw the clubs playing every other team in their own county home and away, and playing once each against the clubs from the other county. Results from all games counted towards the Rugby Football League Championship, whilst results within the county counted towards the respective county leagues.

The championship often included teams from outside the Yorkshire and Lancashire heartlands; these were allocated to a county league on a practical basis. Briefly, in the 1908–1909 season, there were enough clubs from Wales to add a third Welsh League to the structure. The sole winner of this title was Merthyr Tydfil.

The Yorkshire and Lancashire Leagues were abandoned in 1970.

== Results ==
Lancashire League
- Sport: Rugby league
- Instituted: 1895
- Ceased: 1970
- Number of teams: 16
- Country: England
- Last winners: Wigan (18th title)
- Most titles: Wigan (18 titles)

The RFL Lancashire League was an annual competition from 1895 to 1970 for professional rugby league teams in Lancashire. Other teams from Cheshire and Cumbria also competed in the league. During the period 1896–1901 the county leagues were played as there was no national league championship during this period. After they were played alongside the RFL Championship until 1970. Teams also competed in the Lancashire Cup.

To keep the number of teams equal in both county leagues, clubs from Yorkshire were often invited to play in the Lancashire League. Halifax joined the Lancashire League in 1930, remaining there until the start of the Second World War. Following the demise of Belle Vue Rangers in 1955, it was initially decided that the Yorkshire League champions would compete in the Lancashire League during the following season, but clubs were later elected into the league on a voluntary basis instead.

=== Championship ===
Season	Winners
1895–96	Runcorn
1896–97	Broughton Rangers
1897–98	Oldham
1898–99	Broughton Rangers
1899–1900	Runcorn
1900–01	Oldham
1901–02	Wigan
1902–07: No competition
1907–08	Oldham
1908–09	Wigan
1909–10	Oldham
1910–11	Wigan
1911–12	Wigan
1912–13	Wigan
1913–14	Wigan
1914–15	Wigan
1915–18	No competition due to World War I
1918–19	Rochdale Hornets
1919–20	Widnes
1920–21	Wigan
1921–22	Oldham
1922–23	Wigan
1923–24	Wigan
1924–25	Swinton
1925–26	Wigan
1926–27	St Helens Recs
1927–28	Swinton
1928–29	Swinton
1929–30	St. Helens
1930–31	Swinton
1931–32	St. Helens
1932–33	Salford
1933–34	Salford
1934–35	Salford
1935–36	Liverpool Stanley
1936–37	Salford
1937–38	Warrington
1938–39	Salford
1939–45	No competition due to World War II
1945–46	Wigan
1946–47	Wigan
1947–48	Warrington
1948–49	Warrington
1949–50	Wigan
1950–51	Warrington
1951–52	Wigan
1952–53	St. Helens
1953–54	Warrington
1954–55	Warrington
1955–56	Warrington
1956–57	Oldham
1957–58	Oldham
1958–59	Wigan
1959–60	St. Helens
1960–61	Swinton
1961–62	Wigan
1962–63	Workington Town
1963–64	St. Helens
1964–65	St. Helens
1965–66	St. Helens
1966–67	St. Helens
1967–68	Warrington
1968–69	St. Helens
1969–70	Wigan

==== Wins by club ====
Rank	Club	Wins	Years
1	Wigan	18	1901–02, 1908–09, 1910–11, 1911–12, 1912–13, 1913–14, 1914–15, 1920–21, 1922–23, 1923–24, 1925–26, 1945–46, 1946–47, 1949–50, 1951–52, 1958–59, 1961–62, 1969–70
2	St. Helens	9	1929–30, 1931–32, 1952–53, 1959–60, 1963–64, 1964–65, 1965–66, 1966–67, 1968–69
3	Warrington	8	1937–38, 1947–48, 1948–49, 1950–51, 1953–54, 1954–55, 1955–56, 1967–68
4	Oldham	7	1897–98, 1900–01, 1907–08, 1909–10, 1921–22, 1956–57, 1957–58
5	Salford	5	1932–33, 1933–34, 1934–35, 1936–37, 1938–39
6	Swinton	5	1924–25, 1927–28, 1928–29, 1930–31, 1960–61
7	Broughton Rangers	2	1896–97, 1898–99
8	Runcorn	2	1895–96, 1899–1900
9	Rochdale Hornets	1	1918–19
10	Widnes	1	1919–20
11	Workington Town	1	1962–63
12	St Helens Recs	1	1926–27
13	Liverpool Stanley	1	1935–36

== Yorkshire League ==
Yorkshire League
- Sport: Rugby league
- Instituted: 1895
- Ceased: 1970
- Number of teams: 16
- Country: England
- Last winners: Leeds (15th title)
- Most titles: Leeds (15 titles)

The RFL Yorkshire League was an annual competition from 1895 to 1970 for professional rugby league teams in Yorkshire. During the period 1896–1901 the county leagues were played as there was no national league championship during this period. After they were played alongside the RFL Championship until 1970. Teams also competed in the Yorkshire Cup.

=== Championship ===
Season	Winners
1895–96	Manningham
1896–97	Brighouse Rangers
1897–98	Hunslet
1898–99	Batley
1899–1900	Bradford FC
1900–01	Bradford FC
1901–02	Leeds
1902–07	No competition
1907–08	Hunslet
1908–09	Halifax
1909–10	Wakefield Trinity
1910–11	Wakefield Trinity
1911–12	Huddersfield
1912–13	Huddersfield
1913–14	Huddersfield
1914–15	Huddersfield
1915–18	No competition due to World War I
1918–19	Hull
1919–20	Huddersfield
1920–21	Halifax
1921–22	Huddersfield
1922–23	Hull
1923–24	Batley
1924–25	Hull Kingston Rovers
1925–26	Hull Kingston Rovers
1926–27	Hull
1927–28	Leeds
1928–29	Huddersfield
1929–30	Huddersfield
1930–31	Leeds
1931–32	Hunslet
1932–33	Castleford
1933–34	Leeds
1934–35	Leeds
1935–36	Hull
1936–37	Leeds
1937–38	Leeds
1938–39	Castleford
1939–45	No competition due to World War II
1945–46	Wakefield Trinity
1946–47	Dewsbury
1947–48	Bradford Northern
1948–49	Huddersfield
1949–50	Huddersfield
1950–51	Leeds
1951–52	Huddersfield
1952–53	Halifax
1953–54	Halifax
1954–55	Leeds
1955–56	Halifax
1956–57	Leeds
1957–58	Halifax
1958–59	Wakefield Trinity
1959–60	Wakefield Trinity
1960–61	Leeds
1961–62	Wakefield Trinity
1962–63	Wakefield Trinity
1963–64	Halifax
1964–65	Castleford
1965–66	Wakefield Trinity
1966–67	Leeds
1967–68	Leeds
1968–69	Leeds
1969–70	Leeds

==== Wins by club ====
	Winners	Count	Years
1	Leeds	15	1901–02, 1927–28, 1930–31, 1934–35, 1935–36, 1936–37, 1937–38, 1950–51, 1954–55, 1956–57, 1960–61, 1966–67, 1967–68, 1968–69, 1969–70
2	Huddersfield	11	1911–12, 1912–13, 1914–15, 1915–16, 1919–29, 1921–22, 1928–29, 1929–30, 1948–49, 1949–50, 1951–52,
3	Wakefield Trinity	8	1909–10, 1910–11, 1945–46, 1958–59, 1959–60, 1961–62, 1962–63, 1965–66
4	Halifax	7	1908–09, 1920–21, 1952–53, 1953–54, 1955–56, 1957–58, 1963–64
5	Hull	4	1918–19, 1922–23, 1926–27, 1935–36
6	Hunslet	3	1897–98, 1907–08, 1931–32
7	Castleford	3	1932–33, 1938–39, 1964–65
8	Batley	2	1898–99, 1923–24
9	Hull Kingston Rovers	2	1924–25, 1925–26
10	Bradford FC	2	1899–1900, 1900–01
11	Dewsbury	1	1946–47
12	Manningham	1	1895–96
13	Bradford Northern	1	1947–48
14	Brighouse Rangers	1	1896–97
