= Rugby league county cups =

English rugby competitions

Historically, English rugby league clubs competed for the Lancashire Cup and the Yorkshire Cup, known collectively as the county cups. The leading rugby clubs in Yorkshire had played in a cup competition (affectionately known as t’owd tin pot) for several years prior to the schism of 1895. However, the Lancashire authorities had refused to sanction a similar tournament, fearing it would lead to professionalism.

After the split, the replacement for the Yorkshire Cup was not immediately introduced; however, new Yorkshire and Lancashire Cups were introduced in the 1905–06 season.

The county cups were played on the same basis as the Challenge Cup, with an open draw and straight knock-out matches leading to a final.

The county cups were abandoned in 1993 due to the more successful clubs complaining about overloaded fixtures, but the Yorkshire Cup was revived in 2019.

== TV coverage ==
The BBC regularly televised both the Lancashire and Yorkshire Cup finals from 1958–59 to 1984–85 usually as part of the Grandstand programme but after 1984–85 the BBC dropped the county cups from its Rugby League coverage due to cutbacks. But from 1987–88 to 1990–91 both the Lancashire and Yorkshire Cup finals were televised by ITV in their respective regions. In 1987–88, 1988–89, 1989–90 and 1990–91 Yorkshire Television through their Scrumdown programme with live coverage. The Lancashire Cup final was televised by Granada in 1989–90 and 1990–91 under the Rugby League Live name again with live coverage. The 1991–92 Lancashire and Yorkshire Cup finals were both shown by British Aerospace Sportscast the Yorkshire Cup Final was live but the Lancashire Cup Final was recorded and shown on the Monday Night. But the last finals in 1992–93 were not shown on TV. The 1985–86 and 1986–87 Yorkshire Cup finals and the Lancashire Cup finals in 1985–86, 1986–87, 1987–88 and 1988–89 also had no TV coverage. The 1965–66 and 1968–69 Lancashire Cup finals were played on a Friday night and likely to have been recorded by the BBC and shown on Grandstand the following day.
