= 1934–35 Northern Rugby Football League season =

1934–35 Rugby Football League season
- League: Championship
- Duration: 38 Rounds
- Teams: 28
- Champions: Swinton (4th title)
- Season Leaders: Swinton
- Runners-up: Warrington
- Top point-scorer(s): (Wales) Jim Sullivan ( Wigan) (348)
- Top try-scorer(s): (Wales) Jack Morley ( Wigan) (49)

The 1934–35 Rugby Football League season was the 40th season of rugby league football. A single league Championship was contested by twenty eight teams. The Challenge Cup was contested for the 35th time and the first European Championship took place between England, France and Wales.

== Season summary ==
Swinton won their fourth Championship beating Warrington 14–3 in the play-off final after ending the regular season as the league leaders.

The Challenge Cup winners were Castleford who defeated Huddersfield 11–8 in the final.

London Highfield returned north and changed their name to Liverpool Stanley.

Bradford Northern move into their new Odsal Stadium. The first match there on 1 September 1934 ended in a loss to Huddersfield.

Salford won the Lancashire League, and Leeds won the Yorkshire League. Salford beat Wigan 21–12 to win the Lancashire County Cup, and Leeds beat Wakefield Trinity 5–5 (replays: 2–2, 13–0) to win the Yorkshire County Cup.

== Championship ==
	Team	Pld	W	D	L	PF	PA	Pts
1	Swinton	38	30	1	7	468	175	61
2	Warrington	38	28	3	7	445	253	59
3	Wigan	38	26	4	8	790	290	56
4	Salford	38	27	1	10	478	272	55
5	Leeds	38	26	2	10	531	321	54
6	Hull	38	25	0	13	562	430	50
7	Huddersfield	38	22	3	13	552	379	47
8	York	38	21	3	14	527	374	45
9	Castleford	38	20	3	15	512	355	43
10	St Helens Recs	38	21	1	16	431	404	43
11	Hunslet	38	21	0	17	549	461	42
12	Keighley	38	20	2	16	398	479	42
13	Broughton Rangers	38	20	1	17	451	357	41
14	Halifax	38	18	4	16	380	314	40
15	Liverpool Stanley	38	18	2	18	399	287	38
16	Wakefield Trinity	38	18	1	19	494	331	37
17	Widnes	38	18	0	20	395	339	36
18	Oldham	38	15	4	19	358	447	34
19	Rochdale Hornets	38	16	1	21	395	521	33
20	Barrow	38	15	1	22	396	460	31
21	St. Helens	38	14	3	21	278	377	31
22	Dewsbury	38	14	2	22	307	501	30
23	Hull Kingston Rovers	38	13	1	24	414	514	27
24	Leigh	38	13	0	25	311	589	26
25	Bradford Northern	38	11	1	26	321	580	23
26	Batley	38	9	1	28	306	603	19
27	Featherstone Rovers	38	6	0	32	293	804	12
28	Bramley	38	4	1	33	337	861	9

== Championship play-offs ==
Semi-finals
1	Swinton	10
4	Salford	2
2	Warrington	9
3	Wigan	0

Championship final
Swinton	14
Warrington	3

== Challenge Cup ==
Castleford beat Huddersfield 11–8 in the final at Wembley before a crowd of 39,000. This was Castleford’s first Challenge Cup Final win in their first Final appearance.

This was Huddersfield’s first defeat in six Final’s appearances.

== European Championship ==
The tri-nation tournament was played between January and April 1935 as single round robin games between England, France and Wales. This was the first Rugby League European Championship, won by England on Points Average.
Match Details

Date	Venue	Home team	Score	Away team
1 Jan 1935	Bordeaux	France	18 - 11	Wales
28 Mar 1935	Paris	France	15 - 15	England
10 April 1935	Liverpool	England	24 - 11	Wales

== Sources ==
- 1934-35 Rugby Football League season at wigan.rlfans.com
- The Challenge Cup at The Rugby Football League website
