= 1933–34 Northern Rugby Football League season =

First rugby club in London

- League: Championship
- Duration: 38 Rounds
- Teams: 28
- Champions: Wigan (4th title)
- League Leaders: Salford
- Runners-up: Salford
- Top point-scorer(s): (Wales) Jim Sullivan ( Wigan) (406)
- Top try-scorer(s): Brown ( Salford) (45)

The 1933–34 Rugby Football League season was the 39th season of rugby league football. The first rugby league club in London, London Highfield competed in its inaugural season.

== Season summary ==
Wigan won their fourth Championship when they beat Salford 15-3 in the play-off final.

Salford had ended the regular season as league leaders.

The Challenge Cup winners were Hunslet who beat Widnes 11-5.

Work begins at a former quarry that was being used as a waste dump at Odsal Top in Bradford after Bradford Northern sign a ten-year lease with the local council. This was to become the site of their current home ground, Odsal Stadium.

Salford won the Lancashire League, and Leeds won the Yorkshire League. Oldham beat St Helens Recs 12–0 to win the Lancashire County Cup, and York beat Hull Kingston Rovers 10–4 to win the Yorkshire County Cup.

== Championship ==
	Team	Pld	W	D	L	PF	PA	Pts
1	Salford	38	31	1	6	715	281	63
2	Wigan	38	26	0	12	739	334	52
3	Leeds	38	26	0	12	597	376	52
4	Halifax	38	26	0	12	457	340	52
5	York	38	24	1	13	481	370	49
6	Hunslet	38	23	1	14	608	441	47
7	Widnes	38	21	4	13	393	324	46
8	Warrington	38	22	1	15	508	370	45
9	Swinton	38	22	1	15	418	322	45
10	Hull	38	21	3	14	553	438	45
11	Keighley	38	22	1	15	429	367	45
12	Huddersfield	38	20	1	17	500	330	41
13	St. Helens	38	20	0	18	550	500	40
14	London Highfield	38	20	0	18	509	489	40
15	Oldham	38	17	3	18	400	520	37
16	Castleford	38	17	1	20	476	468	35
17	Rochdale Hornets	38	17	0	21	442	524	34
18	St Helens Recs	38	16	1	21	455	477	33
19	Hull Kingston Rovers	38	16	1	21	444	482	33
20	Batley	38	16	1	21	390	436	33
21	Leigh	38	15	2	21	479	537	32
22	Wakefield Trinity	38	15	2	21	332	404	32
23	Broughton Rangers	38	15	1	22	415	495	31
24	Barrow	38	15	0	23	375	464	30
25	Dewsbury	38	12	1	25	313	587	25
26	Bramley	38	11	1	26	367	790	23
27	Bradford Northern	38	8	0	30	337	714	16
28	Featherstone Rovers	38	4	0	34	232	734	8

== Championship play-off ==
Semi-finals
1	Salford	28
4	Halifax	3
2	Wigan	14
3	Leeds	10

Championship final
Salford	3
Wigan	15

== Challenge Cup ==
Hunslet's winning team posing with the Challenge Cup.

Hunslet defeated Widnes 11-5 in the final at Wembley before a crowd of 41,280.

This was Hunslet’s second Cup Final win, the first being in 1907–08, in their third Cup Final appearance.

== Kangaroo Tour ==
August until December also saw the appearance of the Australian team in England on their 1933–34 Kangaroo Tour. Other than the three test Ashes series against Great Britain (who played under the name of England), The Kangaroos played matches against club and county representative sides as well as a non-test international against Wales and two internationals against England, the first of which was held at the Stade Pershing in Paris, the first rugby league match played in France.

The Kangaroos were captain-coach by Frank McMillan.

game	Date	Result	Venue	Attendance
1	26 August	Australia def. St Helens Recs 13–9	City Road, St. Helens	8,880
2	30 August	Australia def. Leigh 16–7	Mather Lane, Leigh	4,590
3	2 September	Australia def. Hull Kingston Rovers 20–0	Craven Park, Hull	7,831
4	6 September	Australia def. Bramley RLFC 53–6	Barley Mow, Bramley	1,902
5	9 September	Australia def. Oldham 38–6	The Watersheddings, Oldham	15,281
6	13 September	Yorkshire def. Australia 13–0	Headingley, Leeds	10,309
7	16 September	Australia def. Barrow 24–5	Craven Park, Barrow-in-Furness	12,221
8	20 September	Australia def. Lancashire 33–7	Wilderspool Stadium, Warrington	16,576
9	23 September	Australia def. Wigan 18–17	Central Park, Wigan	15,712
10	27 September	Australia def. Castleford 15–2	Wheldon Road, Castleford	4,250
11	30 September	Australia def. Halifax 16–5	Thrum Hall, Halifax	10,358
12	7 October	England def. Australia 22–14	Station Road, Swinton	34,000
13	11 October	Australia def. Bradford Northern 7–5	Birch Lane, Bradford	3,328
14	14 October	Australia def. Warrington 15–2	Wilderspool Stadium, Warrington	16,431
15	18 October	Australia def. Hunslet 22–18	Parkside, Hunslet	6,227
16	21 October	Salford def. Australia 16–9	The Willows, Salford	15,761
17	26 October	Australia def. Widnes 31–0	Naughton Park, Widnes	6,691
18	28 October	Australia def. Wakefield Trinity 17–6	Belle Vue, Wakefield	5,596
19	30 October	Australia def. Bradford Northern 10–7	Birch Lane, Bradford	3,328
20	1 November	English League XIII def. Australia 16–9	Clarence Street, York	3,158
21	4 November	Swinton def. Australia 10–4	Station Road, Swinton	13,341
22	11 November	England def. Australia 7–5	Headingley, Leeds	29,618
23	14 November	Australia def. Keighley 10–7	Lawkholme Lane, Keighley	3,800
24	18 November	Australia def. Huddersfield 13–5	Fartown Ground, Huddersfield	7,522
25	22 November	Australia def. London Highfield 20–5	White City Stadium, London	10,541
26	25 November	Australia def. Broughton Rangers 19–0	Belle Vue Zoological Gardens, Manchester	5,527
27	29 November	Australia def. Leeds 15–7	Headingley, Leeds	5,295
28	2 December	Australia def. St Helens 20–11	Knowsley Road, St. Helens	5,735
29	2 December	Australia def. Rochdale Hornets 26–4	Athletic Grounds, Rochdale	3,603
30	9 December	(Cumbria) Cumberland def. Australia 17–16	Recreation Ground, Whitehaven	5,800
31	16 December	England def. Australia 19–16	Station Road, Swinton	10,900
32	23 December	Australia def. York 15–7	Clarence Street, York	6,500
33	25 December	Australia def. Hull F.C. 9–5	The Boulevard, Hull	16,341
34	30 December	Australia def. Wales 51–19	Wembley Stadium, London	10,000
35	31 December	Australia def. England 63–13	Stade Pershing, Paris	5,000
36	10 January	Australia def. Oldham 38–5	The Watersheddings, Oldham	4,000
37	13 January	England def. Australia 19–14	Redheugh Park, Gateshead	15,576

== Sources ==
- 1933-34 Rugby Football League season at wigan.rlfans.com
- The Challenge Cup at The Rugby Football League website
