= 1935–36 Northern Rugby Football League season =

- League: Championship
- Duration: 38 Rounds
- Teams: 30
- Champions: Hull (3rd title)
- League Leaders: Hull
- Runners-up: Widnes
- Top point-scorer(s): (Wales) Jim Sullivan ( Wigan) (246)
- Top try-scorer(s): (Australia) Eric Harris ( Leeds) (63)
- Joined League: Acton and Willesden; Streatham and Mitcham

The 1935–36 Rugby Football League season was the 41st season of rugby league football. Thirty teams competed in a single league Championship. The Challenge Cup was contested for the 36th time and the second European Championship took place.

== Season summary ==
Hull F.C. won their third Championship when they defeated Widnes 21–2 in the play-off final. Hull F.C. had also finished the regular season as league leaders.

The Challenge Cup Winners were Leeds who beat Warrington 18–2 in the final.

Two new London clubs join the competition: Acton and Willesden and Streatham and Mitcham.

Liverpool Stanley won the Lancashire League, and Hull F.C. won the Yorkshire League. Salford beat Wigan 15–7 to win the Lancashire County Cup, and Leeds beat York 3–0 to win the Yorkshire County Cup.

== Championship ==
	Team	Pld	W	D	L	Pts
1	Hull	38	30	1	7	61
2	Liverpool Stanley	38	27	2	9	56
3	Widnes	38	25	4	9	54
4	Wigan	38	25	1	12	51
5	Salford	38	25	0	13	50
6	Broughton Rangers	38	23	3	12	49
7	York	38	22	4	12	48
8	Leeds	38	23	2	13	48
9	Huddersfield	38	23	0	15	46
10	Barrow	38	21	3	14	45
11	Warrington	38	21	3	14	45
12	Castleford	38	22	0	16	44
13	Halifax	38	20	3	15	43
14	Swinton	38	19	3	16	41
15	Oldham	38	20	1	17	41
16	Hunslet	38	20	1	17	41
17	Batley	38	19	2	17	40
18	Keighley	38	18	2	18	38
19	Bradford Northern	38	16	2	20	34
20	Rochdale Hornets	38	17	0	21	34
21	Acton & Willesden	38	13	4	21	30
22	Wakefield Trinity	38	13	2	23	28
23	St. Helens	38	13	1	24	27
24	Streatham & Mitcham	38	12	2	24	26
25	Bramley	38	12	2	24	26
26	St Helens Recs	38	11	1	26	23
27	Leigh	38	10	2	26	22
28	Hull Kingston Rovers	38	9	3	26	21
29	Dewsbury	38	6	2	30	14
30	Featherstone Rovers	38	5	4	29	14

== Championship play-offs ==
Semi-finals
1	Hull	13
4	Wigan	2
2	Liverpool Stanley	9
3	Widnes	10

Championship final
Hull	21
Widnes	2

== Challenge Cup ==
Leeds beat Warrington 18–2 in the Challenge Cup Final played at Wembley Stadium on Saturday 18 April 1936 before a crowd of 51,250.

Evan Williams' three goals gave Leeds the victory.

This was Leeds’ fourth Challenge Cup Final win in as many Final appearances.

== European Championship ==
The tri-nation tournament was played between November 1935 and February 1936 as single round robin games between England, France and Wales. This was the second Rugby League European Championship, won by Wales.
Match details

Date	Venue	Home team	Score	Away team
23 Nov 1935	Llanelli	Wales	41 - 7	France
1 Feb 1936	Hull KR	England	14 - 17	Wales
16 Feb 1936	Paris	France	7 - 25	England

== Sources ==
- 1935–36 Rugby Football League season at wigan.rlfans.com
- The Challenge Cup at The Rugby Football League website
