= List of Castleford Tigers players =

The Castleford Tigers (known as Castleford RLFC until 1996) are an English rugby league club who have competed in the British rugby league system since 1926. Over 1,000 individual players have represented the club throughout its history, with each being assigned a unique heritage number based on the order of their first appearance.

This list comprises every player who has appeared (thus excluding non-playing substitutes) in a competitive first-class match for Castleford. This includes any matches that were subsequently abandoned, expunged or re-played, but excludes friendlies.

== Players ==
Heritage number	Name	From	Until	Position	App	T	G	DG	Pts	Notes
522	Alan Ackroyd	1969–70	1976–77	Prop	114	23	56	1	183	During his time at Castleford he scored one 2-point drop goal
316	C. A. Adams	1949–50	1950–51		2	0	0	0	0	
133	Les Adams	1933–34	1942–43	Scrum-half	196	39	0	0	117	Shot down 31 January 1945 (aged 35) over Burma
903	Shaun Ainscough	2010	2010	Wing	7	4	0	0	16	27 November 1989 (age 36)‡
312	Percy Aldred	1949–50	1951–52		63	14	1	0	44	
37	D. J. Aldridge	1926–27	1927–28		1	0	0	0	0	
126	Joseph Allan	1932–33	1933–34		1	0	0	0	0	
152	Stan Allan	1935–36	1938–39		27	1	2	0	7	
736	Chris Allen	1996	1996		1	0	0	0	0	15 October 1978 (age 47)‡
202	Richard Allman	1940–41								
324	Colin Anderson	1950–51	1956–57		121	20	5	0	70	
657	Grant Anderson	1986–87	1997	Centre	234	82	0	1	329	21 February 1969 (age 57)‡
306	Joseph Anderson	1948–49	1955–56	Prop	204	8	0	0	24	
620	Kevin Anderson	1982–83	1984–85	Prop	11	0	1	0	2	‡
100	George Andrews	1930–31	1931–32		8	0	0	0	0	
110	Charles Annable	1931–32	1933–34	Scrum-half	30	1	0	0	3	
481	David Appleyard	1964–65	1968–69		19	9	0	0	27	
354	Jackson Appleyard	1952–53	1956–57		2	0	0	0	0	
517	Roy Appleyard	1968–69	1974–75		67	17	47	0	145	
257	… Archer	1944–45	1945–46		1	0	0	0	0	
768	Danny Arnold	2000	2000	Wing, Fullback, Centre	5	0	0	0	0	15 April 1977 (age 49)‡±
54	Mack Arnold	1927–28	1928–29		1	0	0	0	0	
891	Joe Arundel	2008	2012	Wing, Centre	42	15	2	0	64	22 August 1991 (age 35)‡±
428	Norman Ashall	1957–58	1958–59		5	0	0	0	0	
117	Ambrose Askin	1931–32	1937–38	Fullback	89	7	0	0	21	
430	Maurice Askin	1957–58	1960–61		11	1	0	0	3	
98	Thomas C. Askin	1930–31	1937–38	Wing, Centre	196	64	0	0	192	14 January 1976 (aged 70)
914	Martin Aspinwall	2011	2011	Second-row, Loose forward	19	2	0	0	8	21 October 1981 (age 44)‡±
16	William Asquith	1926–27	1931–32		97	25	0	0	75	
191	Jack Astbury	1939–40	1942–43		20	5	3	0	21	
991	Cory Aston	2018	2019	Scrum-half, Stand-off	10	4	0	0	16	20 March 1993 (age 33)‡
630	Brett Atkins	1983–84	1987–88	Wing, Second-row	45	21	0	0	84	5 August 1964 (age 62)‡
686	Gary Atkins	1990–91	1992–93	Centre, Stand-off, Scrum-half	9	1	0	0	4	‡
21	Arthur Atkinson	1926–27	1942–43		431	157	230	1	933	Captain. During his time at Castleford he scored one 2-point drop goal
927	Josh Atkinson	2012	2012	Wing	2	0	0	0	0	4 October 1991 (age 34)‡±
498	Jack Austin	1966–67	1970–71	Left wing	91	31	0	0	93	
48	Jim Bacon	1927–28	1930–31		41	7	0	0	21	
206	Dennis Baddeley	1940–41	1942–43	Wing	12	3	0	0	9	Died May 2006 (aged 85)
839	Andy Bailey	2005	2005		12	1	0	0	4	
958	Ryan Bailey	2015	2015	Prop	6	1	0	0	4	11 November 1983 (age 42)‡±
475	Dennis Baker	1963–64	1968–69		8	1	0	0	3	
595	George Ballantyne	1978–79	1980–81	Prop, Second-row	45	6	0	0	18	
190	George W. Banks	1940–41	1942–43	Prop	11	0	0	0	0	
150	Thomas Banks	1935–36	1942–43		41	2	0	0	6	
737	Lee Bardauskas	1996	1997		2	0	0	0	0	27 June 1979 (age 47)‡
867	Dwayne Barker	2007	2007	Second-row, Loose forward, Centre	26	17	0	0	68	21 September 1984 (age 42)‡±
274	Sidney Barker	1945–46	1946–47		1	0	0	0	0	
389	Jack Barnes	1955–56	1965–66		93	3	102	0	213	
327	Irvin Barraclough	1950–51	1953–54	Fullback	20	0	16	2	36	During his time at Castleford he scored two 2-point drop goal
397	Fred Barrett	1956–57	1957–58		2	0	0	0	0	
485	Peter Barton	1964–65	1966–67		15	8	0	0	24	
785	Wayne Bartrim	2002	2003	Scrum-half, Hooker, Loose forward	48	10	166	0	372	9 October 1971 (age 54)‡
879	Jake Bassinder	2007	2007		1	0	0	0	0	±
278	Arthur Bastow	1945–46	1952–53		140	28	0	0	84	
781	David Bates	2001	2002	Prop	5	0	0	0	0	23 October 1980 (age 45)‡±
221	Eric Batten	1941–42	1941–42	Wing	1	0	0	0	0	Wartime guest appearance
332	Robert Batten	1951–52	1955–56		93	15	0	0	45	
40	Billy Batten	1926–27	1927–28	Fullback, Wing, Centre	8	1	0	0	3	
427	Colin Battye	1957–58	1966–67	Wing	174	75	0	0	225	Died Apr 2018 (aged 82)
586	Ian D. Battye	1977–78	1979–80		13	1	0	0	3	Died 28 Feb 2007 (aged 54)
462	Malcolm Battye	1961–62	1967–68	Centre	52	8	0	0	24	
627	Neil Battye	1983–84	1993–94	Second-row	63	11	0	0	44	11 August 1963 (age 63)‡
611	Kevin Beardmore	1979–80	1992–93	Hooker, Prop	247	80	0	0	297	During his time at Castleford he scored twenty-three 3-point tries and fifty-seven 4-point tries. 21 June 1960 (age 66)‡
608	Robert "Bob" Beardmore	1979–80	1989–90	Stand-off, Scrum-half	293	99	518	9	1397	During his time at Castleford he scored forty-four 3-point tries and fifty-five 4-point tries. 21 June 1960 (age 66)‡
662	Michael Beattie	1987–88	1988–89	Centre	20	10	0	0	40	1 July 1960 (age 66)‡
104	Ben Beaumont	1930–31	1931–32		3	0	0	0	0	
345	Stan Beaumont	1952–53	1953–54		10	1	0	0	3	
425	Brian Beck	1957–58	1958–59		4	0	0	1	2	During his time at Castleford he scored one 2-point drop goal
286	Arthur Bedford	1946–47	1947–48		2	0	0	0	0	
474	Trevor Bedford	1962–63	1971–72		111	6	0	0	18	
61	Millward Bedworth	1928–29	1929–30		1	0	0	0	0	
667	Gary Belcher	1988–89	1989–90	Fullback	11	5	0	1	21	28 May 1962 (age 64)‡
507	John Bell	1966–67	1967–68		1	0	0	0	0	
476	Roy Bell	1966–67	1967–68		48	4	2	0	16	
569	Alan Bence	1974–75	1977–78		66	6	0	0	18	
754	Jamie Benn	1998	2000	Fullback, Wing	13	1	26	0	56	4 May 1977 (age 49)‡±
115	Albert Bennett	1931–32	1932–33		4	2	0	0	6	
299	Fred Bennett	1947–48	1949–50		2	0	0	0	0	
260	George Bennett			Centre, Stand-off, Scrum-half						Wartime guest
421	John Berry	1957–58	1962–63		32	1	0	0	3	
394	Rowland Berry	1955–56	1957–58		43	1	0	0	3	
502	Howard Bibb	1966–67	1970–71		18	1	0	0	3	
245	Joe Bibby	1944–45	1945–46		1	0	0	0	0	
392	Ron Bickerdyke	1955–56	1957–58		3	0	0	0	0	
828	Deon Bird	2005	2006	Fullback, Wing, Centre, Loose forward	46	17	0	0	68	27 January 1976 (age 50)‡
1006	Lewis Bienek	2021	present	Prop	1	0	0	0	0	11 April 1998 (age 28)
122	John T. Bird	1932–33	1933–34		1	0	0	0	0	
547	Charles Birdsall	1971–72	1976–77		63	4	11	1	35	
606	Ian Birkby	1979–80	1983–84	Stand-off	46	13	38	1	116	‡
378	Frank Birkin	1954–55	1956–57		24	6	0	0	18	
521	Terry Biscomb	1969–70	1976–77		27	5	0	0	15	
265	James C. Black	1944–45	1947–48		3	1	0	0	3	
658	John Blackburn	1986–87	1990–91		10	0	0	0	0	‡
931	Ben Blackmore	2012	2012	Wing, Centre	1	0	0	0	0	19 February 1993 (age 33)‡±
695	Ritchie Blackmore	1991–92	1995–96	Centre	111	64	0	0	256	2 July 1969 (age 57)‡
993	Cheyse Blair	2019	present	Centre, Wing, Second-row	37	8	0	0	32	25 March 2001 (age 25)‡
520	Graham Blakeway	1968–69	1972–73	Loose forward	23	2	5	0	16	
793	Richard Blakeway	2002	2004	Second-row	16	0	0	0	0	22 July 1983 (age 43)‡±
843	Damien Blanch	2005	2006	Wing	12	4	0	0	16	24 May 1983 (age 43)‡±
672	Dean Blankley	1988–89	1990–91		5	0	0	0	0	28 October 1968 (age 57)‡
702	Jamie Bloem	1992–93	1993–94	Fullback, Wing, Centre, Scrum-half, Second-row, Loose forward	1	1	0	0	4	26 May 1971 (age 55)‡
461	Geoff Bloomfield	1961–62	1962–63		1	0	0	0	0	
195	Eddie Bolton	1940–41	1941–42		1	0	0	0	0	
171	Gordon Bonner	1937–38	1938–39	Fullback	2	0	0	0	0	
372	Jack Boot	1954–55	1958–59		53	0	0	0	0	
262	Gordon Booth	1944–45	1949–50		33	6	0	0	18	World War II guest at Huddersfield during the 1944–45 season
659	Giles Boothroyd	1987–88	1993–94	Centre	61	24	0	0	96	17 March 1969 (age 57)‡
727	Frano Botica	1996	1996	Fullback, Wing, Five-eighth	21	5	84	0	190	3 August 1963 (age 63)‡
155	Wilfred Boucher	1935–36	1946–47		14	3	3	0	15	
267	Jim Bowden			Hooker, Second-row						
187	Trevor Bowen	1939–40	1939–40	Stand-off	1	0	0	0	0	
840	Ryan Boyle	2005	2009	Prop	58	10	1	0	42	17 October 1987 (age 38)‡±
227	Jack Bradbury	1941–42								
234	Joe Bradbury			Prop						Wartime guest
696	Graeme Bradley	1991–92	1992–93	Centre	33	4	0	0	16	20 March 1964 (age 62)‡
393	Ron Bradley	1955–56	1956–57		2	0	0	0	0	
363	William Bradshaw	1953–54	1954–55		7	0	0	0	0	
581	Peter Brady	1976–77	1977–78		12	1	0	0	3	Heritage No. 581, Kurri Kurri Bulldogs
682	Ian Bragger	1989–90	1992–93		27	4	0	0	16	‡
809	Dominic Brambani	2004	2005	Scrum-half	8	0	0	0	0	10 May 1985 (age 41)‡±
419	Keith Bridges	1957–58	1963–64	Hooker	110	4	0	0	12	
454	Peter Briers	1960–61	1962–63		9	0	30	0	60	
587	David Briggs	1977–78	1979–80		20	0	0	0	0	
269	Geoff Briggs	1945–46	1947–48		36	0	59	0	118	
493	Trevor Briggs	1965–66	1978–79	Fullback, Left wing	338	92	0	0	276	Captain.
167	Fred Brindle	1937–38	1947–48	Loose forward	81	14	0	0	42	
550	Gary Brook	1972–73	1976–77		92	22	0	0	66	
199	Kenneth Brookes	1940–41	1946–47		84	18	41	0	136	
859	Danny Brough	2006	2007	Stand-off, Scrum-half	35	12	153	4	358	15 January 1983 (age 43)‡±
319	George Broughton Jr.	1949–50	1953–54	Wing	92	37	0	0	111	
436	George Brown	1958–59	1963–64		101	29	0	0	87	
466	Gilbert Brown	1962–63	1965–66		10	1	0	0	3	
242	Len Brown	1944–45	1952–53		20	2	0	0	6	World War II guest at Huddersfield during the 1944–45 season
505	Richard Brown	1966–67	1970–71		16	0	0	1	1	
22	William Brown	1926–27	1927–28		1	0	0	0	0	
437	William Brownley	1958–59	1963–64		20	0	0	0	0	
272	Harry Brummitt	1945–46	1946–47		3	0	0	0	0	
546	Steve Brunyee	1971–72	1976–77		36	2	1	0	8	
410	Edward Bryant	1956–57	1963–64		62	5	0	0	15	
426	William Bryant	1957–58	1970–71	Second-row	253	75	0	0	225	Died 9 Jun 2019 (aged 78)
219	… Buckle	1941–42	1942–43		1	0	0	0	0	
519	Norman Bullen	1968–69	1972–73		11	0	0	0	0	
584	John Burke	1976–77	1978–79	Prop	12	2	0	0	6	Died 9 Jun 2013 (aged 65)
577	Bruce Burton	1975–76	1980–81	Stand-off	135	89	41	4	353	
380	Clifford Burton	1954–55	1959–60		107	31	0	0	93	
387	Raymond Burton	1955–56	1956–57		1	0	0	0	0	
448	Colin Butterfield	1959–60	1963–64		47	12	0	0	36	
273	James Byrne	1945–46	1946–47		2	0	0	0	0	
201	Albert Caddick	1940–41	1941–42		1	0	0	0	0	
763	Logan Campbell	2000	2000	Centre, Second-row	20	6	0	0	24	23 May 1971 (age 55)‡
252	Ronald Caress	1943–44	1943–44		1	0	0	0	0	
209	Joseph Carmichael									
933	Justin Carney	2013	2015	Wing, Centre	62	63	0	0	252	16 July 1988 (age 38)‡±
203	Frank Carr	1940–41	1941–42		1	0	0	0	0	
196	George Carrington	1940–41								
47	Fred Carter	1927–28	1929–30		41	11	0	0	33	
434	Howard Cartwright	1958–59	1964–65		18	6	0	0	18	
948	Garreth Carvell	2014	2014	Prop	6	1	0	0	4	21 April 1980 (age 46)‡±
224	Des Case	1941–42	1941–42	Wing, Centre	1	0	0	0	0	Wartime guest appearance
69	John Casey	1928–29	1933–34		81	17	1	0	53	
384	Brian Caswell	1955–56	1956–57		1	0	0	0	0	
889	Ned Catic	2008	2008	Second-row	14	3	0	0	12	2 August 1978 (age 48)‡±
81	John Cayser	1929–30	1930–31		1	0	0	0	0	
940	Michael Channing	2013	2015	Centre	28	8	0	0	32	30 June 1992 (age 34)‡±
634	Chris Chapman	1984–85	1990–91	Centre, Left wing	60	26	0	0	104	‡±
732	David Chapman	1996	1998	Wing, Centre	33	9	0	0	36	19 February 1973 (age 53)‡
58	Harold Chapman	1927–28	1934–35	Wing	111	31	0	0	93	
782	Chris Charles	2001	2007	Second-row, Hooker, Loose forward	32	5	2	0	24	7 March 1976 (age 50)‡±
489	Barry Charlesworth	1964–65	1966–67		22	2	0	0	6	
894	Rangi Chase	2009	2013	Stand-off, Scrum-half, Hooker	136	48	0	3	195	11 April 1986 (age 40)‡±
554	Trevor Chawner	1972–73	1974–75		14	0	0	0	0	
154	Jack Cheetham	1935–36	1936–37		2	0	0	0	0	
235	Alfred Chester									
277	Fred Church	1945–46	1948–49		32	9	1	0	29	
271	William Churm	1945–46	1946–47		1	0	0	0	0	
228	Thomas Clapham	1941–42								
926	James Clare	2012	present	Fullback, Wing	63	30	0	0	120	13 April 1991 (age 35)‡±
915	Daryl Clark	2011	2014	Hooker, Loose forward	94	37	0	0	148	10 February 1993 (age 33)‡±
439	John Clark	1958–59	1965–66		61	14	100	0	242	Died Jan 2011 (aged 71)
985	Mitch Clark	2018	2019	Prop	24	3	0	0	12	30 March 1993 (age 33)‡±
677	Andy Clarke	1989–90	1992–93		30	2	0	0	8	‡
988	Chris Clarkson	2019	2019	Second-row, Loose forward, Prop	20	4	0	0	16	7 April 1990 (age 36)‡
399	Desmond Clarkson	1956–57	1957–58	Second-row, Loose forward	1	0	3	0	6	
544	George Claughton	1971–72	1983–84	Fullback, Wing	142	13	1	0	41	‡±
310	Richard Claughton	1948–49	1954–55		45	6	43	0	104	
802	Ryan Clayton	2004	2010	Second-row, Loose forward	95	14	0	0	56	22 November 1982 (age 43)‡±
259	Jack Clinton									
255	George Clinton	1944–45	1952–53		103	25	4	0	83	Castleford Head-coach 1964-66
395	Anthony Clough	1955–56	1957–58		5	0	0	0	0	
337	Herbert Coates	1951–52	1952–53		7	1	0	0	3	
622	Darren Coen	1982–83	1985–86	Fullback	77	15	0	0	55	During his time at Castleford he scored five 3-point tries and ten 4-point tries.‡
183	Albert Collins	1939–40	1942–43		4	0	0	0	0	
604	Gary Connell	1978–79	1985–86	Prop, Second-row	151	16	0	0	54	During his time at Castleford he scored ten 3-point tries and six 4-point tries.‡
887	Matt Cook	2008	2020	Prop, Second-row, Loose forward	115	13	0	0	52	14 November 1986 (age 39)‡±
829	Leigh Cooke	2005	2005		8	0	0	0	0	
570	Peter Cookland	1975–76	1978–79		49	5	0	0	15	
573	Ronald Coombs	1975–76	1977–78		5	0	0	0	0	
904	Mike Cooper	2010	2010	Second-row	6	2	0	0	8	15 September 1988 (age 38)‡±
275	Ronald Copley	1945–46	1948–49		59	15	0	0	45	
417	Ian Corban	1957–58	1960–61		26	0	0	0	0	
160	Gordon Cottington	1936–37	1946–47	Hooker	121	2	0	0	6	Died 7 Jun 1996 (aged 85)
711	Jamie Coventry	1994–95	1996		26	6	0	0	24	9 February 1977 (age 49)‡
536	John Coventry	1970–71	1973–74		22	0	0	0	0	
318	John Cowes	1949–50	1952–53		8	0	0	0	0	
701	Peter Coyne	1992–93	1993–94	Five-eighth	29	2	1	0	10	28 October 1964 (age 61)‡
664	Paul Crabtree	1987–88	1990–91		17	1	0	0	4	‡
591	James Crampton	1977–78	1984–85	Second-row, Loose forward	96	17	0	0	56	During his time at Castleford he scored twelve 3-point tries and five 4-point tries.‡
149	Don Craven	1935–36								
745	Jason Critchley	1997	1998	Wing, Centre, Fullback	39	15	0	0	60	7 December 1970 (age 55)‡
873	Eddie Croft	2007	2007		1	2	0	0	8	
963	Ben Crooks	2016	2016	Wing, Centre	28	6	1	0	26	15 June 1993 (age 33)‡±
685	Lee Crooks	1989–90	1997	Prop, Second-row	222	18	596	1	1265	18 September 1963 (age 63)‡
136	James Crossley	1933–34	1949–50	Second-row	261	23	6	2	85	During his time at Castleford he scored two 2-point drop goals.
605	John Crossley Jr.	1978–79	1979–80	Wing, Stand-off, Scrum-half	7	3	0	0	9	
401	John Crossley Sr.	1956–57	1957–58		4	0	0	0	0	
954	Steve Crossley	2015	2015	Prop	6	0	0	0	0	28 November 1990 (age 35)‡±
130	Jim Croston	1933–34	1945–46	Centre	283	150	52	0	554	
819	Steven Crouch	2004	2005	Second-row	34	8	1	0	34	24 December 1977 (age 48)‡
135	Bernard Cunniffe	1933–34	1946–47	Wing, Centre	184	89	0	0	267	
441	Trevor Dale	1958–59	1960–61		6	0	0	0	0	
713	Paul Darley	1994–95	1996	Hooker, Second-row, Loose forward	13	0	2	0	4	26 January 1974 (age 52)‡±
210	Vic Darlison			Hooker, Loose forward						Wartime guest appearance. Died 1982 aged 65–66
270	… Davies	1945–46	1946–47		1	0	0	0	0	
920	Ben Davies	2011	2013	Prop	9	2	0	0	8	2 November 1989 (age 36)‡±
905	John Davies	2010	2011	Second-row	7	1	0	0	4	8 January 1981 (age 45)‡±
266	Ladis Davies									Could this be Idwal Davies?
4	Tommy Davies	1926–27	1927–28		19	1	0	0	3	
111	William H. Davies	1931–32	1937–38	Stand-off	204	25	0	5	85	During his time at Castleford he scored five 2-point drop goals.
746	Brad Davis	1997	2006	Stand-off, Scrum-half, Hooker	141	53	66	10	354	13 March 1968 (age 58)‡± Assistant coach 2005-06
949	Brad Day	2014	2014	Second-row, Loose forward	1	0	0	0	0	23 September 1994 (age 32)‡±
515	Michael Day	1968–69	1971–72		21	5	0	0	15	
530	Tony Dean	1969–70	1973–74	Scrum-half, Loose forward	30	9	3	0	33	Died 18 Jul 2014 (aged 65)
121	Tom Dennis	1932–33	1934–35		8	0	0	0	0	
86	Wally Desmond	1929–30	1930–31	Wing, Centre, Stand-off	2	0	0	0	0	
75	George H. Devonshire	1928–29	1930–31		3	0	0	0	0	
644	Steve Diamond	1985–86	1986–87	Fullback, Centre	16	1	6	1	17	‡
542	Alan Dickinson	1971–72	1979–80	Centre, Stand-off, Prop, Hooker, Second-row	139	14	0	0	42	
25	Albert E. Dickinson	1926–27	1929–30		13	3	0	0	9	
479	Clive Dickinson	1963–64	1975–76	Hooker	328	29	1	0	89	
467	Frank Dickinson	1962–63	1964–65		22	0	53	1	108	During his time at Castleford he scored one 2-point drop goal.
870	Kirk Dixon	2007	2014	Fullback, Wing, Centre	160	72	308	0	904	19 July 1984 (age 42)‡±
32	Norman Dixon	1926–27	1928–29		7	0	0	0	0	
755	Gareth Dobson	1998	2000	Hooker, Loose forward	11	0	0	0	0	31 December 1978 (age 47)‡±
338	Terry Dolan	1951–52								
90	William Dolan	1929–30	1930–31		1	0	0	0	0	
862	Stuart Donlan	2007	2008	Fullback, Wing	50	28	0	0	112	29 August 1978 (age 48)‡±
368	George Dooler	1953–54	1954–55		1	0	0	0	0	
882	Luke Dorn	2008	2016	Fullback, Stand-off, Scrum-half	85	64	1	0	258	2 July 1982 (age 44)‡±
972	Brandon Douglas	2016	2018	Prop, Second-row	2	0	0	0	0	‡±
561	Peter Downham	1974–75	1975–76		1	0	0	0	0	
875	Matt Duckworth	2007	2007		1	1	0	0	4	
294	Joey Dudley	1947–48	1953–54		10	2	0	0	6	
844	Luke Dyer	2006	2006	Wing, Centre	20	5	0	0	20	15 August 1981 (age 45)‡±
756	Michael Eagar	1999	2005	Fullback, Centre, Stand-off	152	69	0	0	276	15 August 1973 (age 53)‡±
371	Frank East	1954–55	1959–60		85	34	0	0	102	
249	Jack East	1944–45	1952–53		46	5	0	0	15	
769	Barry Eaton	2000	2000	Stand-off, Scrum-half, Hooker	5	0	3	0	6	30 September 1973 (age 53)‡±
143	William Ecclestone	1934–35	1935–36		2	0	0	0	0	
918	Greg Eden	2011	present	Fullback, Wing	82	83	0	0	332	14 November 1990 (age 35)‡±
712	Phil Eden	1994–95	1996	Wing, Centre	9	3	0	0	12	13 December 1963 (age 62)‡
458	Derek Edwards	1960–61	1972–73	Fullback	309	38	0	0	116	thirty-eight 3-point tries equates to 114-points, not the 116-points stated in the thecastlefordtigers.co.uk reference. Died 27 Jan 2020
729	Diccon Edwards	1996	1997	Wing	15	1	4	0	12	13 March 1973 (age 53)‡
855	Grant Edwards	2006	2006		3	0	0	0	0	22 March 1987 (age 39)‡±
979	Tuoyo Egodo	2017	2019	Wing, Centre, Second-row	16	11	0	0	44	16 February 1997 (age 29)‡±
788	Olivier Elima	2002	2002	Second-row, Prop, Loose forward	1	1	0	0	4	19 May 1983 (age 43)‡±
765	Dean Ellis	2000	2000		1	0	0	0	0	‡
929	Jamie Ellis	2012	2019	Stand-off, Scrum-half, Hooker	65	17	155	2	380	4 October 1989 (age 36)‡±
188	Joseph Ellis	1939–40								
680	St. John Ellis	1989–90	1994–95	Wing	175	97	17	0	422	3 October 1964 (age 62)‡± Died 31 Dec 2005 (aged 41)
752	Danny Ellison	1998	1999	Wing	27	7	0	0	28	16 December 1972 (age 53)‡
913	Jacob Emmitt	2011	2013	Prop, Second-row, Loose forward	52	0	0	0	0	4 October 1988 (age 37)‡±
832	Anthony England	2005	2005	Prop	2	0	0	0	0	
139	Eric England	1934–35	1938–39		18	5	1	0	15	Five 3-point tries, and one 2-point goal equates to 17-points, not the 15- points stated in the thecastlefordtigers.co.uk reference.
621	Keith England	1982–83	1994–95	Second-row, Prop	346	33	0	0	130	During his time at Castleford he scored two 3-point tries and thirty-one 4-point tries. 27 February 1964 (age 62)‡
1004	Niall Evalds	2021	present	Fullback	9	3	0	0	12	26 August 1993 (age 33)‡
101	Candy Evans	1930–31	1931–32	Hooker, Second-row	18	1	0	0	3	
892	James Evans	2009	2010	Centre	31	15	0	0	60	5 November 1978 (age 47)‡±
404	Ronald Evans	1956–57	1961–62	Scrum-half	90	8	0	0	24	
361	Len Exley	1953–54	1954–55		1	0	0	0	0	
850	Richard Faʻaoso	2006	2006	Prop, Second-row, Loose forward	26	5	0	0	20	8 May 1984 (age 42)‡
893	Sione Faumuina	2009	2009	Stand-off, Second-row, Loose forward	21	2	0	0	8	27 March 1981 (age 45)‡±
897	Chris Feather	2009	2009	Prop	27	0	0	0	0	7 December 1981 (age 44)‡±
999	Sosaia Feki	2020	present	Wing	1	0	0	0	0	9 May 1991 (age 35)‡
24	Arthur Feltham	1926–27	1930–31		60	3	50	3	115	During his time at Castleford he scored three 2-point drop goals.
560	Stephen Fenton	1974–75	1987–88	Left wing, Centre, Stand-off	252	89	0	0	278	During his time at Castleford he scored seventy-eight 3-point tries and eleven 4-point tries.‡
321	Archie Ferguson	1949–50	1952–53		28	4	0	0	12	
895	Brett Ferres	2009	2012	Centre, Stand-off, Second-row, Loose forward	89	27	0	0	108	17 April 1986 (age 40)‡±
385	Raymond Fewster	1955–56	1957–58		36	7	0	0	21	
246	Alex Fiddes	1944–45	1945–46	Centre						Wartime guest
663	John Fifita	1987–88	1988–89	Prop, Second-row	24	6	0	0	24	28 July 1959 (age 67)‡
599	David Finch	1978–79	1985–86	Wing, Centre, Second-row, Loose forward	106	46	117	1	364	forty-six 3-point tries (note that any tries scored from the 1983–84 season to the 1985–86 season would have been 4-point tries), one-hundred and seventeen 2-point goals, and one 1-point drop goal equates to 373-points, not the 364-points stated in the thecastlefordtigers.co.uk reference.‡
943	Liam Finn	2014	2015	Stand-off, Scrum-half	53	9	6	2	50	2 November 1983 (age 42)‡±
292	Alfred Fisher	1947–48	1952–53		68	18	0	0	54	
571	Tony Fisher	1975–76	1977–78	Prop, Hooker	45	1	0	0	3	
703	Andy Fisher	1992–93	1994–95	Prop, Second-row	23	1	0	0	4	17 November 1967 (age 58)‡±
298	Arthur Fisher	1947–48	1952–53		90	20	2	0	64	
243	George Fisher	1944–45	1945–46		1	0	0	0	0	
968	Conor Fitzsimmons	2016	2016	Loose forward, Second-row	2	0	0	0	0	7 May 1998 (age 28)‡
408	William Flanagan	1956–57	1957–58		22	1	0	0	3	
938	Dan Fleming	2013	2020	Prop	16	1	0	0	4	8 July 1992 (age 34)‡±
314	Leo Fleming	1949–50	1955–56		88	2	0	0	6	
858	Adam Fletcher	2006	2008	Wing	24	12	0	0	48	1 December 1983 (age 42)‡
640	Thomas Ian Fletcher	1984–85	1987–88		26	1	0	0	4	4 March 1965 (age 61)‡
688	Paul Fletcher	1990–91	1993–94		21	2	0	0	8	‡±
838	Richard Fletcher	2005	2006	Second-row, Loose forward	33	4	17	0	50	17 May 1981 (age 45)‡±
708	Jason Flowers	1993–94	2001	Fullback, Wing, Second-row, Centre	191	47	0	1	189	30 January 1975 (age 51)‡
718	Stuart Flowers	1994–95	1996		16	1	0	0	4	18 April 1971 (age 55)‡±
720	Adrian Flynn	1995–96	1997	Wing	41	21	0	0	84	9 September 1974 (age 52)‡±
970	Paddy Flynn	2016	2016	Wing	10	6	0	0	24	11 December 1987 (age 38)‡±
900	James Ford	2009	2009	Fullback, Wing	10	2	0	0	8	29 September 1982 (age 44)‡±
691	Mike Ford	1991–92	1998	Scrum-half	163	57	0	8	236	18 November 1965 (age 60)‡
297	Desmond Foreman	1947–48	1949–50		44	13	9	0	57	
975	Alex Foster	2017	present	Centre, Prop, Second-row, Loose forward	52	9	0	0	36	25 September 1993 (age 33)‡±
557	Chris Forster	1973–74	1975–76		36	2	0	0	6	
509	Derek Foster	1966–67	1974–75	Wing, Centre	131	53	0	0	159	
471	Kenneth Foulkes	1962–63	1965–66		15	6	0	0	18	
540	Dennis Fowler	1970–71	1976–77		37	1	0	0	3	
510	Frank Fox	1967–68	1970–71	Prop	65	2	0	0	6	
284	Harold Fox	1947–48	1950–51		16	0	0	0	0	
189	John H. Fox	1939–40	1947–48		20	1	0	0	3	
916	Nick Fozzard	2011	2011	Prop	19	0	0	0	0	22 July 1977 (age 49)‡±
856	Paul Franze	2006	2006	Centre	3	0	0	0	0	3 March 1982 (age 44)‡±
628	Gary Freeman	1983–84	1984–85		17	4	0	0	16	4 December 1962 (age 63)‡
678	Gary French	1989–90	1991–92	Scrum-half, Centre, Five-eighth	55	15	1	1	63	27 June 1963 (age 63)‡
647	Ian French	1985–86	1986–87	Second-row, Loose forward	20	11	0	0	44	28 December 1960 (age 65)‡
383	Anthony Fretwell	1955–56	1956–57		1	0	0	0	0	
761	Dale Fritz	1999	2003	Five-eighth, Loose forward	133	9	0	0	36	18 November 1969 (age 56)‡±
725	David Furness	1995–96	1996		4	3	0	0	12	20 June 1971 (age 55)‡
952	Luke Gale	2015	2019	Stand-off, Scrum-half	104	33	415	16	978	22 June 1988 (age 38)‡±
465	Jack Gamble	1962–63	1967–68	Centre	101	39	0	0	117	
559	Brian Garbett	1973–74	1979–80		4	0	0	0	0	
174	Len Garbett	1937–38	1942–43		8	1	0	0	3	1956-57 Castleford head coach
818	Mat Gardner	2004	2004	Wing, Centre	1	1	0	0	4	24 August 1985 (age 41)‡±
728	Richard Gay	1996	2002	Fullback, Wing, Centre	134	43	0	0	172	9 March 1969 (age 57)‡±
666	Ron Gibbs	1988–89	1990–91	Second-row, Centre	41	12	0	0	48	14 April 1962 (age 64)‡
946	Ashley Gibson	2014	2015	Wing, Centre	28	11	0	0	44	25 September 1986 (age 40)‡±
794	Damian Gibson	2003	2004	Fullback, Wing, Centre	46	6	0	0	24	14 May 1975 (age 51)‡±
670	Mark Gibson	1988–89	1990–91		17	2	0	0	8	‡
365	Brian Gill	1953–54	1954–55		1	1	0	0	3	
131	James Gill	1933–34	1936–37		19	7	0	0	21	
977	Kieran Gill	2017	2019	Wing	4	4	0	0	16	4 December 1995 (age 30)‡
610	Steve Gill	1979–80	1988–89	Wing	27	5	0	0	19	During his time at Castleford he scored one 3-point tries and four 4-point tries.‡
935	Lee Gilmour	2013	2013	Centre, Second-row	13	0	0	0	0	12 March 1978 (age 48)‡±
865	Tere Glassie	2007	2007	Prop, Second-row, Lock	19	3	0	0	12	‡±
735	Eddie Glaze	1996	1996		1	0	0	0	0	26 September 1977 (age 49)‡
82	William Gledhill	1929–30	1930–31		9	0	0	0	0	
229	Charlie Glover	1941–42								
771	Jon Goddard	2001	2001	Fullback, Centre	2	0	0	0	0	21 June 1982 (age 44)‡±
709	Richard Goddard	1994–95	1997	Fullback, Centre	60	16	36	0	136	28 April 1974 (age 52)‡±
779	Wayne Godwin	2001	2004	Hooker	69	12	0	0	48	13 March 1982 (age 44)‡±
233	Joseph Golby									
212	Herbert Goodfellow	1941–42	1941–42	Scrum-half	1	0	0	0	0	Wartime guest appearance
157	Alfred Goodwin	1935–36	1936–37		1	0	0	0	0	
80	Augustine Gorman	1929–30	1932–33		33	2	0	0	6	
355	Arnold Grace	1952–53	1957–58		25	3	1	1	13	During his time at Castleford he scored one 2-point drop goal.
472	David Grace	1962–63	1964–65		2	0	2	0	4	
1001	Brad Graham	2020	present	Centre, Wing	1	0	0	0	0	1 September 2001 (age 25)‡
418	Gordon Graham	1957–58	1958–59		1	0	0	0	0	
285	Tom Grahame	1946–47	1947–48	Halfback, Five-eighth	24	4	0	0	12	Ex-Balmain
646	Neil Greatbatch	1985–86	1986–87		24	6	0	0	24	17 June 1966 (age 60)‡
411	Sidney Greatbatch	1956–57	1957–58		1	0	0	0	0	
162	George Greaves	1936–37	1938–39		7	1	0	0	3	
161	Arthur Green	1936–37	1937–38		2	1	0	0	3	
449	Frank Green	1959–60	1964–65		15	4	0	0	12	
980	James Green	2018	2018	Prop	4	0	0	0	0	29 November 1990 (age 35)‡±
805	Craig Greenhill	2004	2004	Prop, Second-row	27	1	0	0	4	14 February 1972 (age 54)‡±
924	James Grehan	2012	2012	Centre, Second-row	4	0	0	0	0	17 March 1987 (age 39)‡±
921	Josh Griffin	2012	2012	Wing, Centre	21	14	1	0	58	9 May 1990 (age 36)‡±
996	George Griffin	2020	present	Prop, Second-row, Loose forward	22	2	0	0	8	26 June 1992 (age 34)‡
320	Peter Gronow	1949–50	1950–51		1	0	0	0	0	
524	Ian Guest	1969–70	1971–72		11	4	0	0	12	
179	Norman Guest	1938–39	1950–51	Fullback, Centre	139	41	76	5	285	During his time at Castleford he scored five 2-point drop goals.
328	William Gunby	1950–51	1953–54		29	11	0	0	33	
402	Ronald Guthrie	1956–57	1957–58		3	0	0	0	0	
866	Awen Guttenbeil	2007	2008	Prop, Second-row	43	8	0	0	32	14 March 1976 (age 50)‡
886	Tom Haberecht	2008	2008	Second-row, Centre	5	1	0	0	4	17 May 1985 (age 41)‡±
344	Roy Hague	1952–53	1956–57		27	0	0	0	0	
359	Brian Hale	1953–54	1954–55		2	0	0	0	0	
240	Harold Hale	1944–45	1945–46		5	0	0	0	0	
123	Harold Haley	1932–33	1948–49	Hooker	338	11	0	3	39	During his time at Castleford he scored three 2-point drop goals.
753	Martin Hall	1998	1998	Hooker	4	0	0	0	0	5 December 1968 (age 57)‡
998	Sam Hall	2020	present		1	0	0	0	0	‡
84	Wilson Hall	1929–30	1935–36	Scrum-half	175	24	0	0	72	
594	Tony Halmshaw	1978–79	1980–81	Loose forward	17	0	0	0	0	
232	Ray Hamer	1941–42	1947–48		27	6	0	0	18	
837	Lance Hamilton	2005	2005		2	0	0	0	0	‡±
446	Joe Hampton	1959–60	1961–62		9	0	0	0	0	
99	Harry Hand	1930–31	1934–35		17	0	0	0	0	
965	Ryan Hampshire	2016	2016	Fullback, Wing, Stand-off	22	8	0	0	32	29 December 1994 (age 31)‡±
774	Gareth Handford	2001	2001	Prop	11	0	0	0	0	‡
822	Paul Handforth	2005	2006	Stand-off, Scrum-half, Hooker	40	6	22	1	69	are Paul Handforth and Phil Handforth the same prison? 6 October 1981 (age 44)‡±
331	Derrick Hansell	1950–51	1951–52		1	0	0	0	0	
973	Zak Hardaker	2017	2017	Fullback, Centre, Wing	30	13	1	0	54	17 October 1991 (age 34)‡±
374	Tony Hardcastle	1954–55	1955–56		5	0	0	0	0	
433	Alan Hardisty	1958–59	1971–72	Stand-off	401	206	78	42	858	Captain. During his time at Castleford he scored forty-two 2-point drop goals. Head coach 1970-71
638	Ian Hardisty	1984–85	1985–86		2	0	5	0	10	‡
568	Alan Hardy	1974–75	1984–85	Prop, Hooker, Second-row, Loose forward	112	4	0	6	18	‡
684	Jeff Hardy	1989–90	1991–92	Second-row, Loose forward	51	15	0	0	60	20 May 1966 (age 60)‡±
147	Thomas Hardy	1935–36	1946–47	Stand-off	186	45	0	0	135	
247	… Hargrave	1944–45	1945–46		1	0	0	0	0	
513	Danny Hargrave	1967–68	1973–74	Stand-off, Scrum-half	124	22	0	2	70	During his time at Castleford he scored two 2-point drop goals.
731	Spencer Hargrave	1997	1999		9	0	0	0	0	12 July 1978 (age 48)‡
1	William Hargrave	1926–27	1930–31		108	22	83	2	236	During his time at Castleford he scored two 2-point drop goals.
719	Lee Harland	1994–95	2004	Stand-off, Hooker, Second-row, Loose forward	264	38	0	0	152	4 September 1973 (age 53)‡
96	Clifford Harling	1930–31	1934–35		22	2	0	0	6	
490	Dennis Harris	1964–65	1971–72	Wing	36	14	2	0	46	
290	Dyl Harris	1946–47	1951–52	Prop	133	6	0	0	18	
41	William R. Harris	1926–27	1927–28		2	0	0	0	0	
617	John Harrison	1981–82	1983–84	Wing	3	0	0	0	0	10 March 1965 (age 61)‡
403	Keith Harrison	1956–57	1957–58		1	0	0	0	0	
106	William Harrison	1930–31	1931–32		1	0	0	0	0	
205	Thomas R. Hart	1940–41	1941–42		3	0	0	0	0	
503	Dennis Hartley	1966–67	1975–76	Prop, Hooker	268	15	1	1	49	During his time at Castleford he scored one 2-point drop goal. Died 13 Nov 2019 (aged 83)
641	Ian Hartley	1984–85	1986–87		3	0	0	0	0	‡
415	Arthur Hattee	1956–57	1960–61		17	1	14	0	31	
323	Leslie Haughey	1949–50	1957–58		173	3	0	0	9	
825	Tom Haughey	2005	2006	Second-row, Centre	35	20	0	0	80	30 January 1982 (age 44)‡±
936	Weller Hauraki	2013	2014	Stand-off, Second-row, Loose forward	56	9	0	0	36	18 February 1985 (age 41)‡±
207	… Hawes	1940–41	1941–42		1	0	0	0	0	
687	Andy Hay	1990–91	1995–96	Second-row, Loose forward	75	18	0	0	72	5 November 1973 (age 52)‡ 2005-11 Castleford assistant coach
109	William Hayes	1931–32	1945–46	Stand-off, Scrum-half	23	2	0	0	6	
348	Jack Haynes	1952–53	1953–54		1	0	0	0	0	
773	Mitch Healey	2001	2003	Stand-off, Scrum-half, Hooker	75	11	16	2	78	11 May 1969 (age 57)‡
824	Andrew Henderson	2005	2008	Hooker	115	22	0	0	88	Captain.‡±
137	William Henshaw	1933–34	1934–35		6	0	0	0	0	
762	Brad Hepi	1999	2001	Hooker	28	3	0	0	12	11 February 1968 (age 58)‡±
997	Tyla Hepi	2020	present	Prop, Second-row	13	0	0	0	0	15 June 1993 (age 33)‡
562	Roy Hepton	1974–75	1975–76		3	1	0	0	3	
799	Jonny Hepworth	2003	2005	Fullback, Wing, Centre, Stand-off, Scrum-half, Hooker, Loose forward	70	21	10	0	104	25 December 1982 (age 43)‡±
442	Keith Hepworth	1958–59	1972–73	Scrum-half	329	66	4	14	234	During his time at Castleford he scored fourteen 2-point drop goals.
598	Barry Higgins	1978–79	1986–87	Wing, Centre, Loose forward	99	13	0	0	46	‡
864	Liam Higgins	2007	2010	Prop	105	4	0	0	16	19 July 1983 (age 43)‡±
538	Paul Higgins	1970–71	1975–76		37	5	0	0	15	
94	James Higo	1930–31	1931–32		1	0	0	0	0	
721	Andy Hill	1995–96	1999	Second-row	13	0	0	0	0	16 December 1976 (age 49)‡
239	John Hill	1944–45	1956–57	Prop	158	3	0	0	9	
660	Kenny Hill	1987–88	1990–91	Fullback	31	1	0	0	4	‡
488	Ronald Hill	1964–65	1969–70	Loose forward	83	14	159	2	364	During his time at Castleford he scored two 2-point drop goals.
496	John Hinchcliffe	1965–66	1967–68		5	0	0	0	0	
398	Kenneth Hindley	1956–57	1958–59		30	3	0	0	9	
31	George Hinton	1926–27	1927–28		15	1	0	0	3	
71	Harry Hirst	1928–29	1930–31		8	0	0	0	0	
424	Jack Hirst	1957–58	1965–66	Prop	181	7	3	0	27	Died 19 Oct 2012 (aged 76)
964	Jy Hitchcox	2016	2018	Fullback, Wing, Centre	30	23	0	0	92	18 August 1989 (age 37)‡±
888	Brendan Hlad	2008	2008		3	0	0	0	0	9 January 1987 (age 39)‡
42	Ernest Hobson	1926–27	1927–28		1	0	0	0	0	
1002	Bailey Hodgson	2020	2020	Fullback, Centre	1	0	0	0	0	5 September 2001 (age 25)‡
65	Benjamin T. Hodgson	1928–29	1929–30		2	0	0	0	0	
178	Joe Holmes	1938–39	1940–41		6	2	0	0	6	
907	Oliver Holmes	2010	present	Second-row	220	42	0	0	168	7 August 1992 (age 34)‡±
959	Tom Holmes	2015	2018	Stand-off, Scrum-half, Second-row	20	4	0	0	16	2 March 1996 (age 30)‡±
175	John Horan	1938–39	1946–47		23	1	0	0	3	
668	Shane Horo	1988–89	1989–90	Wing	18	11	0	0	44	19 May 1960 (age 66)‡
377	Alan Horsfall	1954–55	1958–59	Prop	53	3	0	0	9	
619	Stuart Horton	1981–82	1987–88	Hooker	80	10	0	0	39	During his time at Castleford he scored one 3-point tries and nine 4-point tries.‡
119	Jack Hoult	1932–33	1934–35	Centre, Stand-off	52	19	0	0	57	
302	George Howard	1948–49	1959–60		325	17	0	0	51	
473	Keith Howe	1962–63	1970–71	Wing, Centre	167	109	0	0	327	
218	… Hoyle	1941–42	1942–43		1	0	0	0	0	
800	Craig Huby	2003	2014	Prop	167	39	126	0	408	21 May 1986 (age 40)‡±
552	James Huddlestone	1972–73	1980–81	Second-row	63	6	0	0	18	
5	Harry Hudson	1926–27	1933–34		47	12	0	0	36	
786	Ryan Hudson	2002	2011	Hooker, Second-row, Loose forward, Stand-off	150	34	0	0	136	Captain. 20 November 1979 (age 46)‡±
38	Tommy Hudson	1926–27	1927–28		1	0	0	0	0	
144	William E. Huggett	1934–35	1938–39		10	0	0	0	0	
602	Brian Hughes	1978–79	1981–82	Prop	43	3	0	0	9	‡
340	David Hughes	1951–52	1959–60		43	3	0	0	9	
400	James Hunt	1956–57	1958–59		5	1	0	0	3	
18	Elijah Hunter	1926–27	1927–28		3	0	1	0	2	
601	Gary Hyde	1978–79	1988–89	Centre	271	130	216	0	875	‡
173	Gordon Innes	1937–38	1939–40	Centre	22	3	0	0	9	Died on 6 Nov 1992 (aged 82)
444	Douglas Iredale	1959–60	1960–61		24	13	0	0	39	
651	Shaun Irwin	1986–87	1993–94	Centre, Second-row	141	41	0	0	164	8 December 1968 (age 57)‡
917	Willie Isa	2011	2011	Wing, Centre	11	6	0	0	24	1 January 1989 (age 37)‡±
795	Paul Jackson	2003	2011	Prop, Second-row	72	2	0	0	8	29 September 1978 (age 48)‡±
830	Jordan James	2005	2005		22	9	0	0	36	24 May 1980 (age 46)‡±
614	Neil James	1979–80	1985–86	Prop, Second-row	111	17	0	0	60	‡ Died 17 Dec 2014 (aged 53)
549	Richard James	1971–72	1972–73		1	0	0	0	0	Heritage No. 549, Doncaster RLFC (124-appearances 1967–72)
78	William James	1929–30	1936–37		151	22	168	2	406	During his time at Castleford he scored two 2-point drop goals.
564	Tony Jeff	1974–75	1975–76		1	0	0	0	0	
87	Stan Jennings	1929–30	1933–34		42	3	0	0	9	
947	Lee Jewitt	2014	2016	Prop, Second-row, Loose forward	40	1	0	0	4	14 February 1987 (age 39)‡±
653	Chris Johns	1986–87	1987–88	Centre, Wing	18	7	0	0	28	14 March 1964 (age 62)‡
477	Andrew Johnson	1963–64	1965–66		12	1	3	0	9	
784	Andy Johnson	2002	2003	Wing, Centre, Second-row, Loose forward	53	11	0	0	44	14 June 1974 (age 52)‡
613	Barry Johnson	1979–80	1989–90	Prop	222	22	1	0	77	During his time at Castleford he scored thirteen 3-point tries and nine 4-point tries.‡
120	John Johnson	1932–33	1934–35		12	3	0	0	9	
579	Peter Johnson	1975–76	1979–80		7	1	0	0	3	
526	Philip Johnson	1969–70	1981–82	Fullback, Centre, Stand-off	288	86	0	0	258	‡
874	Sean Johnson	2007	2007		5	1	0	0	4	
930	Ben Johnston	2012	2012	Stand-off, Scrum-half	2	0	0	0	0	8 March 1992 (age 34)‡±
872	Adam Jones	2007	2007		1	2	0	0	8	
470	Denis Jones	1962–63	1964–65		14	0	1	0	2	
63	Edwin Jones	1928–29	1929–30		7	0	0	0	0	
192	Eric Jones	1939–40	1947–48		118	10	0	0	30	
504	Glyn Jones	1966–67	1972–73		55	5	0	1	17	During his time at Castleford he scored one 2-point drop goal.
339	Harry Jones	1951–52	1953–54		38	10	0	0	30	
300	Jimmy Jones	1947–48	1951–52		119	0	0	0	0	
186	John A. Jones	1939–40	1940–41		1	0	0	0	0	
642	Keith Jones	1984–85	1988–89		21	1	2	0	8	‡
626	Kevin Jones	1983–84	1985–86	Stand-off, Scrum-half	21	4	39	0	92	During his time at Castleford he scored two 3-point tries and two 4-point tries.‡
896	Stuart Jones	2009	2012	Centre, Hooker, Second-row, Loose forward	101	13	0	0	52	7 December 1981 (age 44)‡±
529	Gary Jordan	1969–70	1971–72	Wing, Centre	3	0	0	0	0	Died 22 Apr 2018 (aged 76–77)
551	John Joyner	1972–73	1992–93	Centre, Stand-off, Loose forward	613	185	0	0	614	Captain. During his time at Castleford he scored one-hundred and twenty-six 3-point tries and fifty-nine 4-point tries.‡r>Head coach 1993-97
97	Ken Jubb	1930–31	1933–34	Second-row	67	8	0	0	24	
665	Brian Juliff	1987–88	1988–89	Wing, Second-row, Loose forward	11	3	0	0	12	5 December 1956 (age 69)‡
580	Paul Kahn	1976–77	1977–78	Prop	24	3	0	0	9	
813	Andy Kain	2004	2006	Stand-off, Scrum-half, Hooker	44	17	44	2	158	1 September 1985 (age 41)‡±
582	John Kain	1976–77	1978–79		29	7	0	0	21	
834	Stuart Kain	2005	2005		5	1	0	0	4	
237	Eddie Karle	1944–45	1945–46		1	0	0	0	0	
138	Rosslyn Kaye	1933–34	1934–35		2	1	0	0	3	
593	Barry Kear	1978–79	1982–83	Prop	18	0	0	0	0	‡
200	Herbert Kear	1940–41	1942–43		5	0	0	0	0	
596	John Kear	1978–79	1988–89	Fullback, Wing, Centre	133	37	0	0	132	During his time at Castleford he scored sixteen 3-point tries and twenty-one 4-point tries. 25 November 1954 (age 71)‡
624	Neil Kellett	1982–83	1983–84	Prop	1	0	0	0	0	‡
208	Kelly									
13	Joseph Kelly	1930–31	1932–33		18	1	0	0	3	
19	Albert E. Kemp	1926–27	1927–28		4	0	0	0	0	
707	Tony Kemp	1993–94	1995–96	Stand-off, Fullback, Centre, Lock	63	27	4	3	119	18 January 1968 (age 58)‡
102	Joseph Kendall	1930–31	1932–33		7	0	0	0	0	
248	Kenneth Kendall	1945–46	1946–47		13	0	0	0	0	
367	Alan Kendrick	1953–54	1954–55		8	0	0	0	0	
373	Andrew Kett	1954–55	1955–56		3	0	0	0	0	
636	Martin Ketteridge	1984–85	1995–96	Second-row	306	14	420	0	896	2 October 1964 (age 62)‡
166	Matt Killingbeck	1937–38	1938–39		49	21	10	0	83	
816	Kevin King	2004	2004	Centre, Second-row	1	0	0	0	0	18 January 1985 (age 41)‡
43	Victor Kinsey	1926–27	1930–31		22	5	0	0	15	
456	Malcolm Kirk	1960–61	1961–62	Loose forward	2	0	0	0	0	Wrestler “King Kong Kirk”. Died in the ring 23 Aug 1987 (aged 51)
523	William Kirkbride	1969–70	1971–72	Prop, Second-row	43	3	0	1	11	During his time at Castleford he scored one 2-point drop goal.
508	Joseph Kirkbright	1966–67	1970–71		6	1	0	0	3	
258	Jack Kitching	1950–51	1952–53	Centre	28	11	0	0	33	
333	Arthur Kitson	1951–52	1955–56		13	0	16	0	32	
528	Glen Knight	1969–70	1974–75		48	13	9	0	57	
125	Donald Knowles	1932–33	1936–37	Wing, Centre, Second-row, Loose forward	38	8	0	0	24	
833	Michael Knowles	2005	2007	Second-row	15	4	0	0	16	2 May 1987 (age 39)‡
108	Fred Knowling	1931–32	1932–33		2	0	0	0	0	
884	Michael Korkidas	2008	2008	Prop	22	1	0	0	4	12 January 1981 (age 45)‡±
350	Roy Lambert	1952–53	1954–55	Wing	26	14	0	1	44	During his time at Castleford he scored one 2-point drop goal.
193	Jack Lane	1940–41	1941–42		22	2	0	0	6	
280	George Langfield	1945–46	1952–53	Fullback, Scrum-half	228	62	370	21	968	Captain. During his time at Castleford he scored twenty-one 2-point drop goals.
674	Steve Larder	1989–90	1991–92	Fullback, Wing	59	39	10	1	177	5 March 1963 (age 63)‡
216	Albany Large	1941–42								
976	Kevin Larroyer	2017	2017	Second-row, Loose forward	7	0	0	0	0	19 June 1989 (age 37)‡±
435	Peni Latu	1958–59	1959–60		1	0	0	0	0	
984	Quentin Laulu-Togaga'e	2018	2018	Fullback, Stand-off	9	6	0	0	24	1 December 1984 (age 41)‡±
261	Eddie Lavender	1944–45	1948–49		87	8	0	0	24	
431	Jim Lawson	1958–59	1959–60		1	0	0	0	0	
868	Mark Leafa	2007	2008	Prop, Second-row	40	11	0	0	44	4 December 1980 (age 45)‡
704	Chance Leake	1992–93	1993–94		1	0	0	0	0	‡
8	John Leake	1926–27	1929–30		72	13	0	0	39	
85	Albert Leese	1929–30	1934–35		10	1	0	0	3	
772	Mark Lennon	2001	2003	Fullback, Wing, Scrum-half, Centre, Stand-off	58	12	21	0	90	17 August 1980 (age 46)‡±
79	George Lewis	1929–30	1945–46	Fullback	373	19	373	11	825	During his time at Castleford he scored eleven 2-point drop goals.
238	Ron Lewis	1944–45	1953–54	Fullback	260	7	2	0	25	
778	Simon Lewis	2001	2001	Wing	4	3	0	0	12	‡
740	Jason Lidden	1997	1997	Second-row, Loose forward, Centre	24	7	0	0	28	24 April 1969 (age 57)‡
450	John Lindley	1959–60	1960–61	Centre, Prop, Second-row	12	0	0	0	0	Died 22 Jan 2019 (aged 85)
655	Bob Lindner	1986–87	1988–89	Lock, Second-row	19	9	0	0	36	10 November 1962 (age 63)‡
244	F Lingard	1944–45								
532	Geoffrey "Sammy" Lloyd	1969–70	1978–79	Wing, Second-row, Loose forward	225	44	741	2	1616	
176	Reg Lloyd	1938–39	1946–47	Wing	248	59	0	0	177	
982	Garry Lo	2018	2018	Wing	1	1	0	0	4	1 November 1993 (age 32)‡±
497	Brian Lockwood	1965–66	1975–76	Prop, Second-row, Loose forward	231	38	8	0	130	
220	Albany Longley	1941–42	1942–43		1	0	0	0	0	
558	Paul Longstaff	1973–74	1975–76		7	0	0	0	0	
637	Gary Lord	1984–85	1988–89	Fullback, Prop	52	9	0	0	36	6 July 1966 (age 60)‡±
516	Alan Lowndes	1968–69	1977–78	Wing	201	83	0	0	249	
575	Doug Lucas	1975–76	1976–77		2	0	0	0	0	
429	Michael Lumb	1957–58	1958–59		2	0	0	0	0	
341	Albert Lunn	1951–52	1963–64	Fullback	363	40	875	0	1870	
835	Shaun Lunt	2005	2005	Hooker	4	0	0	0	0	
857	Peter Lupton	2006	2008	Centre, Stand-off, Scrum-half, Second-row, Loose forward	56	18	0	0	72	7 March 1982 (age 44)‡±
351	Ronald Lyles	1952–53	1954–55		2	0	0	0	0	
759	Andy Lynch	1999	2004	Prop, Second-row	137	15	0	0	60	20 October 1979 (age 46)‡±
49	William E. Lyons	1927–28	1928–29		1	0	0	0	0	
180	Peter Lythgoe	1939–40	1942–43		32	2	11	0	28	
511	John Mackalroy	1967–68	1970–71		14	0	0	0	0	
950	Will Maher	2014	2018	Prop	38	1	0	0	4	4 November 1995 (age 30)‡±
146	Harry Malkin	1934–35	1935–36		1	0	0	0	0	
11	Joseph Malkin	1926–27	1933–34		79	11	1	0	35	
841	Dominic Maloney	2005	2005	Prop	2	0	0	0	0	12 March 1987 (age 39)‡±
749	Francis Maloney	1998	2004	Centre, Stand-off, Scrum-half	86	26	35	3	177	26 May 1973 (age 53)‡
53	Ephraim Malsom	1927–28	1928–29		2	0	0	0	0	
29	Clarence Mann	1926–27	1927–28		3	0	0	0	0	
854	Willie Manu	2006	2006	Second-row	24	9	0	0	36	20 March 1980 (age 46)‡±
362	Alan Marchant	1953–54	1954–55		1	1	0	0	3	
618	Tony Marchant	1981–82	1996	Wing, Centre	268	101	0	0	386	During his time at Castleford he scored eighteen 3-point tries and eighty-three 4-point tries. 22 December 1962 (age 63)‡
945	Frankie Mariano	2014	2016	Prop, Second-row	40	9	0	0	36	10 May 1987 (age 39)‡±
452	Brian Marsden	1960–61	1963–64		57	13	0	0	39	
36	Albert Marshall	1926–27	1932–33		28	1	0	0	3	
459	Peter Marston	1960–61	1961–62		2	0	0	0	0	
1003	Brad Martin	2020	present	Prop	8	0	0	0	8	‡
939	Charlie Martin	2013	2013		2	0	0	0	0	2 December 1992 (age 33)‡±
612	Paul Martin	1979–80	1982–83	Wing	2	0	0	0	0	‡
722	Colin Maskill	1995–96	1996	Hooker	25	7	8	0	44	15 March 1964 (age 62)‡
66	Ray Maskill	1928–29	1931–32	Prop, Second-row	20	1	0	0	3	
853	Keith Mason	2006	2006	Prop	2	0	0	0	0	20 January 1982 (age 44)‡±
876	Nathan Massey	2007	present	Prop, Second-row, Loose forward	254	13	0	0	52	11 July 1989 (age 37)‡±
986	Peter Mata'utia	2018	present	Fullback, Centre	60	9	56	1	149	2 November 1990 (age 35)‡±
1007	Suaia Matagi	2021	present	Prop	4	0	0	0	0	23 March 1988 (age 38)‡
748	Barrie-Jon Mather	1998	2002	Wing, Centre, Second-row	67	23	0	0	92	15 January 1973 (age 53)‡±
911	Ritchie Mathers	2011	2011	Fullback, Centre	23	7	0	0	28	24 October 1983 (age 42)‡±
44	Bob Mattick	1926–27	1930–31		28	2	0	0	6	
673	Terry McAllister	1988–89	1995–96		13	0	0	0	0	‡
478	Harold McCartney	1963–64	1968–69	Prop	28	2	0	0	6	
230	Tommy McCue	1941–42		Scrum-half						Wartime guest
846	Ryan McGoldrick	2006	2012	Fullback, Centre, Stand-off, Scrum-half, Loose forward	154	37	8	1	165	12 January 1981 (age 45)‡±
114	Albert McGonigle	1931–32	1932–33		7	1	0	0	3	
747	Ritchie McKell	1997	1998	Prop	37	2	0	0	8	20 December 1970 (age 55)‡
164	Alfred McManus	1936–37	1937–38		1	0	0	0	0	
141	Patrick B. McManus	1934–35	1937–38		296	16	0	0	48	
956	Mike McMeeken	2015	2020	Second-row	139	34	0	0	136	10 May 1994 (age 32)‡±
777	Andy McNally	2001	2003	Fullback, Wing, Centre, Stand-off	7	1	0	0	4	9 January 1982 (age 44)‡
961	Paul McShane	2015	present	Stand-off, Scrum-half, Hooker	161	25	52	2	202	16 November 1989 (age 36)‡±
34	Joseph McTighe	1926–27	1928–29		31	4	1	0	14	
741	Shaun McVean	1997	1997		1	0	0	0	0	13 October 1969 (age 56)‡
797	Paul Mellor	2003	2004	Wing, Centre, Second-row	39	18	0	0	72	21 August 1974 (age 52)‡
789	Gary Mercer	2002	2002	Fullback, Wing, Second-row	1	0	0	0	0	22 June 1966 (age 60)‡ Head coach 2004
360	Allan Metcalfe	1953–54	1954–55		1	0	0	0	0	
693	Simon Middleton	1991–92	1997	Wing	170	83	5	0	342	2 February 1966 (age 60)‡
495	Tony Miller	1965–66	1974–75	Hooker	135	15	0	0	45	
925	Grant Millington	2012	present	Stand-off, Scrum-half, Prop, Second-row, Loose forward	237	31	0	0	124	1 November 1986 (age 39)‡±
483	Roger Millward	1964–65	1966–67	Wing, Stand-off, Scrum-half	40	16	35	0	118	Died 2 May 2016 (aged 68)
910	Adam Milner	2010	present	Scrum-half, Prop, Hooker, Loose forward	265	37	1	0	150	19 December 1991 (age 34)‡±
3	Harry Minton	1926–27	1927–28		6	1	0	0	3	
966	Greg Minikin	2016	2019	Wing, Centre	96	43	0	0	172	29 March 1995 (age 31)‡±
671	Phil Mirfin	1988–89	1990–91		10	5	0	0	20	‡
922	Lee Mitchell	2012	2013	Centre, Prop, Second-row, Loose forward	23	2	0	0	8	8 September 1988 (age 38)‡±
304	Lister Mogg	1948–49	1952–53		7	0	0	0	0	
962	Joel Monaghan	2016	2017	Wing, Centre	34	13	0	0	52	22 April 1982 (age 44)‡±
885	Scott Moore	2008	2008	Hooker	17	1	0	0	4	23 January 1988 (age 38)‡±
953	Junior Moors	2015	2020	Prop, Second-row, Loose forward	109	18	0	0	72	30 July 1986 (age 40)‡±
222	Cyril Morrell	1941–42	1941–42	Centre	1	0	0	0	0	Wartime guest appearance
565	Geoff Morris	1974–75	1982–83	Fullback, Left wing, Centre, Stand-off	95	12	0	0	36	‡
714	Lynton Morris	1994–95	1995–96		1	0	0	0	0	18 May 1972 (age 54)‡
225	Oliver Morris	1941–42	1942–43	Stand-off	1	0	0	0	0	Wartime guest appearance. Killed in Italy 20 Sep 1944 (aged 27)
698	Tony Morrison	1992–93	1995–96		92	21	0	0	84	17 December 1965 (age 60)‡
842	Jason Mossop	2005	2005		1	0	0	0	0	
631	Dean Mountain	1983–84	1988–89	Prop, Second-row	49	4	0	0	16	‡
217	Harold Moxon	1941–42								
291	Frank Mugglestone	1946–47	1952–53		146	19	0	4	65	During his time at Castleford he scored four 2-point drop goals.
251	Harry Murphy	1944–45		Second-row, Loose forward						Wartime guest
30	Tony Muscroft	1926–27	1927–28		1	0	0	0	0	
20	Jim Nash	1926–27	1928–29		25	2	0	0	6	
923	Steve Nash	2012	2013	Prop, Second-row	7	0	0	0	0	14 January 1986 (age 40)‡±
413	Charles Naylor	1956–57	1958–59		10	3	0	0	9	
555	Jim Naylor	1973–74	1974–75		6	1	0	0	3	
6	Tommy Needham	1926–27	1929–30		77	13	1	1	42	During his time at Castleford he scored one 2-point drop goal.
690	David Nelson	1991–92	1994–95	Left wing	54	14	0	0	56	8 September 1962 (age 64)‡ Killed 22 Jul 2001 (aged 38)
263	Wilf Ness	1944–45	1944–45							
898	Kirk Netherton	2009	2010	Hooker	31	4	0	0	16	10 October 1985 (age 40)‡±
808	Paul Newlove	2004	2004	Centre	5	1	0	0	4	10 August 1971 (age 55)‡±
537	Ray Newton	1970–71	1978–79		185	46	0	0	138	
215	James Nicholls	1941–42	1949–50		117	10	0	0	30	
9	Robert Nicholls	1926–27	1932–33		92	4	0	0	12	
231	J Nicholson	1941–42								
692	Tawera Nikau	1991–92	1996	Loose forward, Lock	165	25	0	0	100	1 January 1967 (age 59)‡
369	George Norbury	1953–54	1955–56		12	4	0	0	12	
381	Dennis Norton	1954–55	1956–57		12	1	0	0	3	Forward who collapsed on the field against New Zealand in 1955 and later died in hospital
588	Paul Norton	1977–78	1983–84	Second-row, Loose forward	105	7	174	0	369	‡±
281	Roy Norton	1945–46	1946–47		1	0	0	0	0	
531	Steve Norton	1969–70	1977–78	Second-row, Loose forward	183	56	4	1	177	
463	Eric Nowell	1949–50	1950–51		10	1	0	0	3	
848	Danny Nutley	2006	2006	Prop	28	3	0	0	12	4 February 1974 (age 52)‡
937	Gareth O'Brien	2013	2021	Stand-off, Fullback, Scrum-half	17	4	16	4	52	31 October 1991 (age 34)‡
322	Lewis O'Connor	1949–50	1950–51		3	1	0	0	3	
989	Jacques O'Neill	2018	2021	Hooker	28	3	0	0	12	8 May 1999 (age 27)‡
346	Harold Oddy	1952–53	1956–57		70	10	0	0	30	
994	Derrell Olpherts	2020	present	Wing, Fullback, Centre	28	15	0	0	60	7 January 1992 (age 34)‡
386	Len Olsen	1955–56	1956–57		3	0	0	0	0	From Halifax (loan)
742	Danny Orr	1997	2012	Stand-off, Scrum-half, Hooker	221	78	310	4	936	Captain. 17 May 1978 (age 48)‡± Interim head coach 2013
578	Paul Orr	1975–76	1982–83	Second-row, Loose forward	108	16	38	0	124	‡
609	Ian Orum	1979–80	1986–87	Fullback, Wing, Stand-off, Scrum-half	113	10	0	1	32	During his time at Castleford he scored nine 3-point tries and one 4-point tries.‡ Died 24 Jun 2020 (aged 64–65)
92, 105, 118, 153, 283, 308; 416, 615	A. N. Other (see note)	1926–27	1986–87	Second-row	12	2	0	0	6	‡
583	Arthur Oulton	1976–77	1978–79		2	0	5	0	10	
35	Harry Owen	1926–27	1928–29		8	1	0	0	3	
863	Richard Owen	2007	2014	Fullback, Wing, Centre	121	59	0	0	236	25 April 1990 (age 36)‡±
301	Ike Owens	1948–49	1949–50	Loose forward	7	2	0	0	6	
716	Craig Palmer	1994–95	1996		3	0	0	0	0	3 January 1971 (age 55)‡±
55	Ralph Panther	1927–28	1928–29		2	0	0	0	0	
733	Junior Paramore	1996	1996	Second-row	11	3	0	0	12	18 November 1968 (age 57)‡
50	Edward Parker	1927–28	1928–29		1	0	0	0	0	
305	Harry Parker	1948–49	1953–54		46	9	0	0	27	
182	James Parker	1939–40	1941–42		3	0	0	0	0	
491	Richard Parker	1964–65	1966–67		7	0	0	0	0	
919	Rob Parker	2011	2011	Prop	8	2	0	0	8	5 September 1981 (age 45)‡±
967	Larne Patrick	2016	2017	Prop	24	1	0	0	4	3 November 1988 (age 37)‡±
860	Jason Payne	2006	2007	Loose forward	5	0	0	0	0	20 January 1988 (age 38)‡±
649	Philip Payne	1985–86	1986–87		15	3	0	0	12	‡
992	Lewis Peachey	2019	present	Second-row, Prop, Loose forward	11	0	0	0	0	25 March 2001 (age 25)‡
51	George A. Pearce	1927–28	1928–29		2	0	0	0	0	
370	Kenneth Pease	1954–55	1955–56		2	0	0	0	0	
198	Eric Pennington	1940–41	1942–43		28	5	0	0	15	
356	Maurice Perrett	1952–53	1956–57		25	0	0	0	0	
336	Trevor Petcher	1951–52	1952–53		4	0	0	0	0	
132	James Phillips	1933–34	1934–35		1	0	0	0	0	
574	Clive Pickerill	1975–76	1978–79	Scrum-half	35	4	0	0	12	
760	James Pickering	1999	1999	Prop	21	0	0	0	0	11 December 1966 (age 59)‡±
553	Stephen Pincher	1972–73	1973–74		1	0	0	0	0	
635	David Plange	1984–85	1991–92	Wing	193	98	5	0	402	24 July 1965 (age 61)‡
820	Michael Platt	2005	2006	Fullback, Centre, Wing	55	23	0	0	92	23 March 1984 (age 42)‡±
39	James Plimmer	1926–27	1936–37		158	1	0	0	3	
128	John Pollitt	1933–34	1937–38		31	1	58	0	119	
878	Craig Potter	2007	2007		1	0	0	0	0	
70	James Powell	1928–29	1931–32		12	0	0	0	0	
214	Stanley Powell	1948–49	1950–51	Fullback, Wing, Centre, Stand-off, Scrum-half	11	1	0	0	3	Died 3 Jan 1995 (aged 78)
676	Darren Price	1989–90	1990–91		7	1	0	0	4	‡
717	Simon Price	1995–96	1996		4	0	0	0	0	15 November 1973 (age 52)‡
317	William T. Pritchard	1949–50	1950–51		1	0	0	0	0	
770	Waine Pryce	2000	2006	Wing, Centre	141	80	0	0	320	3 October 1981 (age 45)‡±
764	Andrew Purcell	2000	2000	Stand-off, Scrum-half, Hooker, Second-row, Loose forward	23	4	0	0	16	20 May 1971 (age 55)‡
600	Gary Pye	1978–79	1979–80		1	0	0	0	0	
422	Jeff Pye	1957–58	1960–61		14	2	0	0	6	
342	Jos J. Pye	1951–52	1957–58		79	3	1	0	11	
330	Kenneth Pye	1950–51	1963–64	Scrum-half, Prop	344	70	0	0	210	
1008	Jason Qareqare	2021	present	Wing	2	1	0	0	4	
790	Adrian Rainey	2002	2002	Prop, Second-row	11	1	0	0	4	6 January 1979 (age 47)‡
987	Jordan Rankin	2019	2020	Fullback, Wing, Five-eighth	31	10	19	0	78	17 December 1991 (age 34)‡±
758	Aaron Raper	1999	2001	Hooker	59	7	2	1	33	28 July 1971 (age 55)‡
57	Percy Raynor	1927–28	1928–29		1	0	0	0	0	
388	Raymond Raynor	1955–56	1956–57		7	0	0	0	0	
494	Mick Redfearn	1965–66	1977–78	Second-row	320	26	387	8	868	During his time at Castleford he scored eight 2-point drop goals.
821	Damien Reid	2005	2005	Centre	16	9	0	0	36	14 March 1984 (age 42)‡±
204	Joe Reenard	1940–41	1942–43		16	11	0	0	33	
254	Frank Rees									
512	Mal Reilly	1967–68	1986–87	Loose forward	316	68	9	4	230	During his time at Castleford he scored sixty-four 3-point tries and four 4-point tries. 19 January 1948 (age 78)‡
10	Bill Renton	1926–27	1929–30		89	4	0	0	12	
941	Ben Reynolds	2013	2014	Stand-off, Scrum-half, Fullback	4	0	0	0	0	15 January 1994 (age 32)‡
566	Alan Rhodes	1974–75	1975–76	Prop, Second-row	13	2	0	0	6	
375	Edward Rhoades	1954–55	1957–58		25	1	0	0	3	
447	Kenneth Rhoades	1959–60	1960–61		1	0	0	0	0	
995	Danny Richardson	2020	present	Scrum-half, Stand-off	25	2	79	1	167	2 September 1996 (age 30)‡
390	Fred Richardson	1955–56	1956–57		5	1	0	0	3	
726	Shaun Richardson	1995–96	1997		14	1	0	0	4	28 August 1973 (age 53)‡
556	Terry Richardson	1973–74	1983–84	Wing, Centre	237	102	0	0	306	‡
289	Colin Ripley	1946–47	1947–48		1	0	0	0	0	
807	Dean Ripley	2004	2004	Wing	7	1	0	0	4	13 September 1983 (age 43)‡
738	Jason Roach	1997	1997	Wing, Fullback	12	6	0	0	24	2 May 1971 (age 55)‡±
623	Mark Roache	1982–83	1985–86	Wing	20	5	0	0	19	During his time at Castleford he scored one 3-point try and four 4-pointtries.‡
851	Ben Roarty	2006	2006	Second-row, Prop	17	2	0	0	8	5 February 1975 (age 51)‡
592	Gary Robbins	1977–78	1979–80		2	0	0	0	0	
955	Ben Roberts	2015	2019	Fullback, Centre, Stand-off, Scrum-half	78	22	0	2	90	8 July 1985 (age 41)‡±
27	Owen Roberts	1926–27	1927–28		1	0	0	0	0	
91	Don Robinson	1929–30	1931–32		4	0	0	0	3	no tries or goals scored, but 3-points scored according to the thecastlefordtigers.co.uk reference.
158	Gilbert Robinson	1936–37	1937–38	Fullback, Centre	2	0	0	0	0	
358	J Robinson									
177	James Robinson	1938–39	1953–54	Centre	184	3	0	0	81	Three 3-point tries (less likely for a centre with 184-matches played) would be only 9-points, 81-points (more likely for a centre} with 184-matches played) would be 27-tries, which (if either) is correct?
814	Luke Robinson	2004	2004	Scrum-half	9	4	3	0	22	25 July 1984 (age 42)‡±
279	Maxwell Robinson	1945–46	1949–50		27	0	0	0	0	
629	Steve Robinson	1983–84	1984–85	Five-eighth, Centre, Halfback, Fullback	20	5	0	0	15	4 March 1965 (age 61)‡
831	Tim Robinson	2005	2005		4	2	0	0	8	
957	Ash Robson	2015	2016	Wing	3	1	0	0	4	4 November 1995 (age 30)‡±
683	Neil Roebuck	1989–90	1993–94	Loose forward	62	11	0	2	46	4 October 1969 (age 56)‡
757	Darren Rogers	1999	2004	Fullback, Wing, Centre	174	89	0	0	356	6 May 1974 (age 52)‡
625	David Roockley	1982–83	1989–90	Fullback	159	43	25	2	224	‡
73	Walker Rookes	1928–29	1929–30		1	0	0	0	0	
780	Jamie Rooney	2001	2001	Scrum-half	3	0	6	0	12	17 March 1980 (age 46)‡±
775	Jon Roper	2001	2001	Fullback, Wing, Centre, Stand-off, Loose forward	14	7	12	0	52	5 May 1976 (age 50)‡±
88	Mel Rosser	1929–30	1930–31	Fullback, Centre, Wing	1	0	0	0	0	8 September 1988 (aged 87)
730	Paul Round	1996	1996	Prop, Second-row	3	0	0	0	0	24 September 1963 (age 63)‡
836	Alex Rowe	2005	2005	Prop, Loose forward	4	0	0	0	0	11 March 1985 (age 41)‡±
457	Brian Rowe	1960–61	1961–62		12	0	0	0	0	
315	Leslie Rowley	1949–50	1951–52		7	1	0	0	3	
803	Sean Rudder	2004	2004	Stand-off, Scrum-half, Hooker	14	3	0	0	12	13 February 1979 (age 47)‡
45	A. R. Rushworth	1927–28	1928–29		4	0	0	0	0	
46	Ben Russell	1927–28	1928–29		3	0	0	0	0	
14	Harry Russell	1926–27	1934–35		226	8	0	0	24	
705	Richard Russell	1993–94	1998	Hooker, Wing	122	13	0	0	52	24 November 1967 (age 58)‡
806	Sean Ryan	2004	2004	Second-row, Loose forward	18	2	0	0	8	23 August 1973 (age 53)‡
253	Ron Rylance			Fullback, Wing, Centre, Stand-off						Wartime guest
134	Ted Sadler	1933–34	1940–41	Loose forward, Second-row	185	54	0	0	162	26 December 1992 (aged 82)
590	David Sampson	1977–78	1981–82	Centre, Second-row	28	0	0	0	0	6 August 1944 (age 82)‡ Head coach 1987-88
661	Dean Sampson	1987–88	2005	Prop	431	68	0	0	272	27 June 1967 (age 59)‡
648	Jamie Sandy	1985–86	1986–87	Fullback, Left wing	18	4	0	0	16	18 January 1963 (age 63)‡
890	Mitchell Sargent	2008	2010	Prop	61	7	0	0	28	2 July 1979 (age 47)‡±
971	Andre Savelio	2016	2016	Second-row	7	1	0	0	4	21 March 1995 (age 31)‡±
791	Tommy Saxton	2002	2007	Fullback, Wing, Centre	74	22	0	1	89	3 October 1983 (age 43)‡±
451	Bert Sayer	1959–60	1961–62		30	1	0	0	3	
723	Andrew Schick	1995–96	1998	Second-row, Loose forward	86	17	0	0	68	27 May 1970 (age 56)‡
409	Derrick Schofield	1956–57	1958–59	Wing, Second-row	37	3	4	0	17	Died 25 Aug 1999 (aged 71)
165	Ernest Schofield	1936–37	1937–38		1	0	0	0	0	
654	Colin Scott	1986–87	1987–88	Fullback, Wing	25	10	8	1	57	22 March 1960 (age 66)‡
250	William Scott	1944–45								
847	Danny Sculthorpe	2006	2006	Prop, Second-row	19	4	0	1	17	8 September 1979 (age 47)‡±
256	Percy Searles	1944–45								
974	Jesse Sene-Lefao	2017	present	Prop, Second-row, Loose forward	100	16	0	0	64	8 December 1989 (age 36)‡±
309	Arthur Senior	1948–49	1949–50		3	0	0	0	0	
52	Albert Shaw	1927–28	1928–29		1	0	0	0	0	
766	Darren Shaw	2000	2001	Prop, Hooker, Second-row	60	1	0	0	4	5 October 1971 (age 54)‡±
527	Les Shaw	1969–70	1974–75		18	1	0	0	3	
539	Leslie Sheard	1970–71	1972–73	Fullback, Centre	9	0	1	0	2	
307	Danny Sheehy	1948–49	1949–50		4	1	0	0	3	
871	Alex Shenton	2007	2007		1	2	0	0	8	
810	Michael Shenton	2004	present	Fullback, Wing, Centre	153	93	0	0	372	Captain. 22 July 1985 (age 41)‡±
576	Tom Sheppard	1975–76	1976–77		8	4	0	0	12	
382	John Sheridan	1955–56	1966–67	Centre, Loose forward	301	86	2	1	264	Captain. During his time at Castleford he scored one 2-point drop goal. Head coach 1972-73
804	Ryan Sheridan	2004	2004	Scrum-half	4	0	0	0	0	24 May 1975 (age 51)‡ Assistant coach 2013–present
883	Brent Sherwin	2008	2010	Scrum-half	52	5	1	4	26	20 March 1978 (age 48)‡±
62	Arthur Sherwood	1928–29	1934–35		183	8	9	0	42	
17	Thomas Sherwood	1926–27	1928–29		26	1	0	0	3	
26	William Sherwood	1926–27	1929–30		2	0	0	0	0	
59	William Sherwood	1927–28								
645	Alan Shillito	1985–86	1988–89	Prop, Second-row	52	3	0	0	12	‡
633	Ron Sigsworth	1984–85	1985–86	Fullback, Centre	27	11	0	0	44	31 August 1961 (age 65)‡
343	Peter Simpson	1952–53	1956–57		48	2	0	0	6	
2	William Skelton	1926–27	1927–28		11	0	0	0	0	
798	Ben Skerret	2003	2003		1	0	0	0	0	21 October 1980 (age 45)‡±
295	Len Skidmore	1947–48	1949–50		66	9	0	0	27	
184	Harry Slater	1939–40	1947–48		23	1	0	0	3	
652	Martin Slater	1986–87	1987–88		1	0	0	0	0	‡
460	Keith Slatter	1960–61	1966–67		41	2	0	0	6	
706	Ian Smales	1993–94	1997	Loose forward, Wing, Centre, Stand-off, Second-row	95	17	0	0	68	26 September 1968 (age 58)‡
443	Thomas Smales	1958–59	1959–60	Scrum-half	4	0	0	0	0	Head coach 1969-70
438	Peter Small	1958–59	1969–70	Wing, Second-row	315	109	0	0	327	
364	Derek Smart	1953–54	1960–61	Wing	84	50	0	0	150	
826	Aaron Smith	2005	2006	Loose forward, Hooker	25	1	0	0	4	10 September 1982 (age 44)‡±
811	Bryon Smith	2004	2005	Prop	34	0	0	0	0	5 March 1984 (age 42)‡±
699	Chris Smith	1992–93	1997	Wing	109	42	0	0	168	30 October 1975 (age 50)‡±
990	Daniel Smith	2019	present	Loose forward, Prop	38	3	0	0	12	20 March 1993 (age 33)‡
468	Frank Smith	1962–63	1965–66	Wing, Centre	45	25	0	0	75	
124	Frank Smith Sr.	1932–33	1947–48	Second-row	282	42	13	0	152	
783	Gary Smith	2001	2001		2	0	0	0	0	‡±
145	Herbert Smith	1934–35	1935–36	Wing, Centre, Prop, Second-row	3	0	0	0	0	
501	Jim Smith	1966–67	1967–68		2	0	0	0	0	
750	Michael Smith	1998	2004	Prop, Second-row	130	33	0	0	132	10 May 1977 (age 49)‡
589	Nigel Smith	1977–78	1978–79		2	0	0	0	0	
744	Paul Smith	1997	2000	Prop, Second-row	45	3	0	0	12	17 May 1977 (age 49)‡±
407	Terry Smith	1956–57	1957–58		3	1	0	0	3	
679	Tony Smith	1989–90	1997	Scrum-half, Stand-off, Hooker	195	90	0	0	360	16 July 1970 (age 56)‡±
89	William R. Smith	1929–30	1930–31		3	1	0	0	3	
942	Marc Sneyd	2014	2014	Fullback, Stand-off, Scrum-half	31	7	117	2	264	9 February 1991 (age 35)‡±
902	Steve Snitch	2010	2011	Centre, Stand-off, Prop, Second-row, Loose forward	61	12	0	0	48	22 February 1983 (age 43)‡±
639	Sean Snowden	1984–85	1985–86		2	0	0	0	0	‡
951	Denny Solomona	2015	2016	Fullback, Wing, Centre	45	60	0	0	240	27 September 1993 (age 33)‡±
669	Graham Southernwood	1988–89	1993–94	Hooker	83	12	0	1	49	5 November 1971 (age 54)‡
650	Roy Southernwood	1985–86	1990–91	Scrum-half, Hooker	58	9	0	0	36	23 June 1968 (age 58)‡
95	Harold Spawforth	1930–31	1931–32		6	0	0	0	0	
776	Andy Speak	2001	2001	Hooker	8	0	0	0	0	21 January 1980 (age 46)‡±
801	Tim Spears	2003	2003	Second-row, Loose forward	3	0	0	0	0	27 July 1984 (age 42)‡±
643	Tony Spears	1986–87	1987–88	Left wing	9	0	0	0	0	‡
616	Paul Spedding	1981–82	1984–85	Prop, Second-row	27	0	0	0	0	‡
960	Gadwin Springer	2015	2018	Prop, Loose forward	58	3	0	0	12	4 April 1993 (age 33)‡±
518	Robert Spurr	1968–69	1983–84	Hooker	323	45	0	0	135	‡
743	Lee St Hilaire	1997	1997	Hooker	6	0	0	0	0	15 February 1967 (age 59)‡
77	George Stafford	1929–30	1933–34		95	11	0	0	33	
172	Charles Staines	1937–38	1951–52	Second-row	170	36	83	0	274	
347	Arthur Staniland	1952–53	1956–57		72	23	0	0	69	
168	William Stead	1937–38	1946–47		73	9	0	0	27	
675	Graham Steadman	1989–90	1997	Stand-off, Fullback	237	121	174	8	840	8 December 1961 (age 64)‡ Head coach 2001-04
492	Ian Stenton	1965–66	1973–74	Centre	138	37	14	3	145	During his time at Castleford he scored three 2-point drop goals.
514	David Stephens	1967–68	1970–71	Wing, Centre	40	11	0	0	33	
710	Gareth Stephens	1994–95	1996	Stand-off, Scrum-half	24	1	0	0	4	15 April 1974 (age 52)‡
525	Gary Stephens	1969–70	1981–82	Scrum-half, Wing	272	78	1	3	240	23 August 1952 (age 74); During his time at Castleford he scored one 2-point drop goal, and two 1-point drop goals.‡
113	J. J. Stobart	1931–32	1932–33		5	0	0	0	0	
56	Sammy Stones	1927–28	1931–32		52	4	4	1	22	During his time at Castleford he scored one 2-point drop goal.
293	George Storey	1947–48	1952–53		11	0	0	0	0	
197	Jack Street	1940–41	1946–47		25	1	0	0	3	
264	Samuel Sweeting	1944–45	1945–46		1	0	0	0	0	
694	Nathan Sykes	1991–92	2004	Prop, Second-row	294	8	0	0	32	8 September 1974 (age 52)‡±
33	Harry Sylvester	1926–27	1929–30		28	3	0	0	9	
751	Gaël Tallec	1998	1999	Second-row, Prop	46	4	0	0	16	15 August 1976 (age 50)‡
932	Jordan Tansey	2013	2015	Fullback, Wing, Scrum-half	48	15	0	0	60	9 September 1986 (age 40)‡±
211	B Taylor									
406	Colin Taylor	1956–57	1964–65	Second-row	78	7	0	0	21	
15	Harry Taylor	1926–27	1927–28		3	1	0	0	3	
329	Jack Taylor	1950–51	1952–53		2	0	0	0	0	
487	John Taylor	1964–65	1967–68	Loose forward	64	8	0	0	24	
288	Len Taylor	1946–47	1947–48		2	0	0	0	0	
597	Peter Taylor	1978–79	1980–81		6	1	0	0	3	
440	Robert Taylor	1958–59	1960–61		32	18	0	0	54	
163	Robert M. Taylor	1936–37	1937–38		8	0	0	0	0	
116	Thomas L. Taylor	1931–32	1946–47	Prop	389	17	0	0	51	22 November 1992 (aged 81)
484	Abe Terry	1964–65	1966–67	Prop	58	0	0	0	0	
881	Anthony Thackeray	2007	2008	Stand-off	19	8	0	0	32	19 February 1986 (age 40)‡±
796	Jamie Thackray	2003	2004	Prop, Second-row	21	5	0	0	20	30 September 1979 (age 47)‡±
792	Adam Thaler	2002	2002		1	0	0	0	0	3 September 1983 (age 43)‡
64	Edwin Thomas	1928–29	1933–34		40	8	0	0	24	
151	Harold Thomas	1935–36	1936–37		2	2	0	0	6	
268	James Thomas									
506	Tony Thomas	1966–67	1971–72	Centre	136	28	0	0	84	
901	Jordan Thompson	2009	2013	Fullback, Wing, Centre, Second-row, Loose forward	78	28	0	0	112	4 September 1991 (age 35)‡±
276	Jim Thornburrow	1945–46	1946–47		3	0	0	0	0	
353	Harry Thornley	1952–53	1958–59		27	1	0	0	3	
325	Dennis Thornton	1950–51	1951–52		10	0	0	0	0	
311	Reg Thornton	1949–50	1950–51		1	0	0	0	0	
656	Wayne (Danny) Thornton	1986–87	1990–91		17	0	0	0	0	‡
969	Danny Tickle	2016	2016	Prop						8 April 1983 (age 43)‡±
607	Andrew Timson	1979–80	1985–86	Second-row, Loose forward	98	28	0	0	86	During his time at Castleford he scored twenty-six 3-point tries and two 4-point tries.‡
420	Albert Tonkinson	1957–58	1964–65		157	8	0	0	24	To Bradford Northern
715	Ian Tonks	1994–95	2001	Prop, Hooker, Second-row	94	12	19	0	86	13 February 1976 (age 50)‡±
815	Motu Tony	2004	2004	Fullback, Wing, Stand-off, Scrum-half	9	1	0	0	4	29 May 1981 (age 45)‡±
817	Mark Tookey	2004	2004	Prop	10	1	0	0	4	9 March 1977 (age 49)‡
76	Thomas Tootles	1929–30	1930–31		3	0	0	0	0	
236	Idris Towill			Centre, Stand-off						Wartime guest
185	Harry Townsley	1939–40	1949–50		12	1	0	0	3	
7	Arthur James Trevis	1926–27	1930–31		88	8	0	0	24	
978	Jacob Trueman	2017	present	Fullback, Stand-off, Scrum-half	83	24	0	1	97	16 February 1999 (age 27)‡
499	David Tucker	1966–67	1969–70		26	1	0	0	3	
983	Calum Turner	2018	2020	Fullback	15	4	10	0	36	‡±
142	Harold Turner	1934–35	1935–36		2	0	0	0	0	from Hunslet Supporters' Club R.L.F.C.
1005	Jordan Turner	2021	present	Centre, Loose forward, Stand-off, Second-row	11	12	0	0	48	9 January 1989 (age 37)‡
223	Ronald Turton	1941–42								Wartime guest appearance
906	Chris Tuson	2010	2010	Second-row	8	0	0	0	0	25 February 1990 (age 36)‡±
724	Brendon Tuuta	1995–96	1997	Second-row, Loose forward, Stand-off	60	4	0	0	16	29 April 1965 (age 61)‡
567	Graham Tyreman	1974–75	1979–80		42	3	0	0	9	
432	Peter Umpleby	1958–59	1959–60		2	0	0	0	0	Played at Hooker for 2 games before returning to Leeds.
534	Ian Van Bellen	1970–71	1973–74	Prop	54	11	5	3	49	During his time at Castleford he scored three 2-point drop goals. Died 30 Jul 2019 (aged 73)
845	Gray Viane	2006	2006	Fullback, Wing, Centre	27	14	0	0	56	19 May 1982 (age 44)‡
739	Adrian Vowles	1997	2005	Fullback, Centre, Stand-off, Loose forward	148	33	1	1	135	30 May 1971 (age 55)‡
500	Peter Waddle	1966–67	1968–69		3	0	0	0	0	
112	Fred Wadsworth	1931–32	1933–34		16	3	0	0	9	
194	Frank Wagstaff	1940–41	1945–46		68	7	0	0	21	
282	Ken Wagstaff	1945–46	1946–47		1	0	0	0	0	
861	Michael Wainwright	2007	2010	Wing	104	40	0	0	160	4 November 1980 (age 45)‡±
148	Frank Walker	1935–36	1942–43		146	51	113	0	379	
455	John Walker	1960–61	1968–69	Loose forward, Hooker	220	27	0	0	81	
909	Jonathan Walker	2010	2013	Prop	50	4	0	0	16	20 February 1991 (age 35)‡±
74	Joseph Walker	1928–29	1930–31		5	0	0	1	2	Born in/near Wakefield, during his time at Castleford he scored one 2-point drop goal. A Joseph Walker played 8-matches as a wing for Wakefield Trinity (Heritage No. 405) from September 1934 to February 1935.
545	Cliff Wallis	1971–72	1974–75		76	12	2	2	44	During his time at Castleford he scored two 2-point drop goals.
412	Barry Walsh	1956–57	1962–63		85	29	0	0	87	
563	Jamie Walsh	1974–75	1979–80	Left wing	63	16	1	0	50	Are Jamie Walsh and James Walsh the same person?
?	James Walsh	1981–82	1981–82	Scrum-half	2	1	0	0	3	Are Jamie Walsh and James Walsh the same person?‡
535	John Walsh	1970–71	1972–73		17	2	0	0	6	
159	Tom Walsh	1936–37	1955–56	Scrum-half	112	26	20	5	128	During his time at Castleford he scored five 2-point drop goals.
326	Ron Walter	1950–51	1958–59		44	4	0	0	12	
469	Doug Walton	1962–63	1972–73	Prop, Loose forward	113	12	2	0	40	Died 25 May 2012 (aged 65–66)
23	Richard Walton	1926–27	1940–41		201	9	0	0	27	
852	Danny Ward	2006	2006	Prop, Second-row	25	2	0	0	8	15 June 1980 (age 46)‡±
533	Denis Ward	1969–70	1970–71		1	0	0	0	0	
366	Ernest Ward	1953–54	1956–57	Fullback, Centre, Second-row	78	9	153	1	335	During his time at Castleford he scored one 2-point drop goal. Head-coach 1953-56
349	Fred Ward	1952–53	1958–59	Loose forward	152	37	0	0	111	
414	Geoffrey G. Ward	1956–57	1966–67	Centre	236	61	1	0	185	
226	J Ward	1941–42								
303	Jeff Ward	1948–49	1950–51		29	10	0	0	30	
453	John Ward	1960–61	1970–71	Prop, Hooker	262	42	0	3	132	During his time at Castleford he scored three 2-point drop goals. Died 30 Dec 2019 (aged 78)
140	John Ward	1934–35	1935–36		15	4	14	2	44	During his time at Castleford he scored two 2-point drop goals.
603	Kevin Ward	1978–79	1990–91	Prop, Second-row, Loose forward	313	74	0	0	249	During his time at Castleford he scored twenty-seven 3-point tries and forty-seven 4-point tries. 5 August 1957 (age 69)‡
241	Len Ward	1944–45								
480	Roy Ward	1963–64	1968–69		21	1	0	0	3	
287	Sidney Ward	1946–47	1948–49		8	0	0	0	0	
981	Joe Wardle	2018	2019	Centre, Second-row	18	1	0	0	4	22 September 1991 (age 35)‡±
482	Trevor Waring	1964–65	1967–68		8	4	0	0	12	
787	Kyle Warren	2002	2002	Lock, Second-row	31	3	0	0	12	1 February 1973 (age 53)‡
213	Dennis Warrior			Centre						Wartime guest appearance
823	Adam Watene	2005	2005	Prop	28	6	0	0	24	7 October 1977 (age 48)‡ Collapsed and died 13 October 2008 (aged 31)
827	Frank Watene	2005	2005		24	5	0	0	20	
697	Chris Watson	1991–92	1994–95		15	1	0	0	4	9 September 1967 (age 59)‡±
877	Liam Watts	2007	present	Prop	77	7	0	0	28	8 July 1990 (age 36)‡±
352	Denzil Webster	1952–53	1957–58		98	63	0	0	189	
934	Jake Webster	2013	2018	Centre, Second-row	125	49	0	0	196	29 October 1983 (age 42)‡±
734	Jon Wells	1996	2002	Fullback, Wing, Centre	139	49	0	0	196	23 September 1978 (age 48)‡±
334	Harold Welsby	1951–52	1956–57		58	0	0	0	0	
869	Joe Westerman	2007	2010	Stand-off, Second-row, Loose forward	103	43	175	0	522	15 November 1989 (age 36)‡±
585	Alf Weston	1976–77	1978–79	Prop	19	3	0	0	9	
72	Herbert Wharville	1928–29	1929–30		1	0	0	0	0	
944	Scott Wheeldon	2014	2015	Prop, Loose forward	42	6	0	0	24	23 February 1986 (age 40)‡±
156	Robert Whelan	1935–36	1936–37		1	0	0	0	0	
681	Paul Whitehead	1989–90	1992–93		2	0	0	0	0	‡
357	Terrence Whitehead	1952–53	1953–54		1	0	0	0	0	
67	Herbert Whitehouse	1928–29	1929–30		2	0	0	0	0	
181	Cyril Whitham	1939–40	1941–42		15	1	0	0	3	
849	Matt Whitaker	2006	2006	Prop, Second-row, Loose forward	11	0	0	0	0	6 March 1982 (age 44)‡
296	Tom Whittlestone	1947–48	1949–50		11	0	0	0	0	
899	Dean Widders	2009	2011	Centre, Stand-off, Second-row	60	23	0	0	92	25 October 1979 (age 46)‡±
486	Ron Willett	1964–65	1969–70	Wing, Centre	128	37	284	0	679	
170	Cyril Williams	1937–38	1938–39		23	5	0	0	15	
880	Danny Williams	2007	2008	Wing	9	10	0	0	40	26 September 1986 (age 40)‡±
700	Dean Williams	1992–93	1993–94		1	0	0	0	0	‡
396	Harry Williams	1955–56	1958–59		17	0	2	0	4	
169	Illtyd M. Williams	1937–38	1939–40		9	2	0	0	6	
129	J. H. Williams	1933–34	1934–35		1	0	0	0	0	
464	Maurice Williams	1961–62	1965–66		16	0	0	0	0	
928	Rhys Williams	2012	2012	Wing	8	4	0	0	16	8 December 1989 (age 36)‡±
405	Arthur Wilmott	1956–57	1958–59		16	0	0	0	0	
28	John Wilson	1926–27	1927–28		1	0	0	0	0	
445	John Wilson	1959–60	1961–62		27	4	0	0	12	
632	Nigel Wilson	1984–85	1985–86		23	4	0	0	16	‡
376	Brian Winn	1954–55	1955–56		2	1	0	0	3	
107	John William Winn	1931–32	1932–33		3	1	0	0	3	
379	John Winn	1954–55	1957–58		17	1	0	0	3	
83	John Winstanley	1929–30	1931–32		8	0	0	0	0	
93	Thomas Winstanley	1929–30	1930–31		1	0	0	0	0	
335	Fred Winterbottom	1951–52	1952–53		14	0	0	0	0	
103	Herbert Wood	1930–31	1931–32		1	0	0	0	0	
908	Kyle Wood	2010	2010	Scrum-half	5	0	0	0	0	8 June 1989 (age 37)‡±
548	Derek Woodall	1971–72	1980–81	Prop	56	0	0	0	0	
60	Harry Woodall	1928–29	1929–30		2	0	0	0	0	
313	Cyril Woolford	1949–50	1954–55	Wing, Centre	67	14	0	0	42	Died 30 Nov 2018 (aged 91)
391	Jack Woolley	1955–56	1956–57		2	0	0	0	0	
12	Jack Wormald	1926–27	1930–31		92	4	0	0	12	
812	Rob Worrincy	2004	2005	Fullback, Wing	2	0	0	0	0	9 July 1985 (age 41)‡±
541	Keith Worsley	1971–72	1980–81	Centre	153	49	0	0	147	
572	Geoffrey Wraith	1975–76	1983–84	Fullback, Centre	216	42	0	0	126	‡ Castleford assistant coach
68	William Wraith	1928–29	1929–30		5	1	0	0	3	
689	Jon Wray	1990–91	1995–96	Wing	55	14	0	0	56	19 May 1970 (age 56)‡
423	Charles Wright	1957–58	1959–60		38	5	0	0	15	
767	Craig Wright	2000	2000	Second-row	10	0	0	0	0	8 September 1971 (age 55)‡±
543	Geoff Wright	1971–72	1972–73		1	0	0	0	0	
127	Harold Young	1933–34	1934–35	Loose forward	7	1	0	0	3	
912	Nick Youngquest	2011	2011	Fullback, Wing, Centre	40	29	2	0	120	28 July 1983 (age 43)‡±

- ^¹ = Played For Castleford (Tigers) During More Than One Period
- ^² = drop-goals are currently worth 1-point, but from the 1897–98 season to prior to the 1973–74 season all goals, whether; conversions, penalties, or drop-goals, scored two points, consequently during this time drop-goals were often not explicitly documented, and "0" indicates that drop-goals may not have been recorded, rather than no drop-goals scored. In addition, prior to the 1949–50 season, the Field-goal was also still a valid means of scoring points
- ^³ = During the first two seasons of the Northern Union (now known as the Rugby Football League), i.e. the 1895–96 season and 1896–97 season, conversions were worth 2-points, penalty goals 3-points and drop goals 4-points
- ¢ = player has (potential) links to other rugby league clubs on Wikipedia
- BBC = BBC2 Floodlit Trophy
- CC = Challenge Cup
- CF = Championship Final
- CM = Captain Morgan Trophy
- RT = League Cup, i.e. Player's No. 6, John Player (Special), Regal Trophy
- YC = Yorkshire Cup
- YL = Yorkshire League

== Notes ==
The players named A. N. Other are likely to be trialists from rugby union whose identities were being protected to prevent the player from facing a life-time ban from rugby union in the era prior to 1995 when rugby union was strictly amateur, and any association with rugby league was considered an act of professionalism.
