= Clifford Burton =

Clifford or Cliff Burton may refer to:

- Cliff Burton (1962–1986), American musician who served as the bassist for Metallica
- Clifford Burton (cricketer), English cricketer who played for Lancashire
- Clifford Burton (rugby league, born c. 1903), England rugby league international
- Clifford Burton (rugby league, Castleford), rugby league player for Castleford
