= Richard Walton =

Richard Walton may refer to:

- Richard J. Walton (1928–2012), an American politician and writer
- Richard Guy Walton (1914–2005), American muralist, including at Federal Building and U.S. Courthouse (Reno, Nevada)
- Richard R. Walton (1909–1993), American inventor
- Richard Walton (rugby league)
- Richard Walton (American football)
- Richard Walton, character in Where Are My Children?
- Dick Walton (1924–2012), English footballer

== See also ==
- Walton (surname)
