= William Hargrave =

William Hargrave may refer to:

- William Hargrave (bass-baritone) (1900–1986), American bass-baritone, actor, and voice teacher
- William Hargrave (governor) (died 1751), British army officer who served as the governor of Gibraltar from 1740 to 1749
- William Hargrave (rugby league), 20th century English rugby league footballer
- William L. Hargrave (1903–1975), American Episcopal priest
