= John Lindley (disambiguation) =

John Lindley (1799–1865) was an English botanist

John Lindley may also refer to:

- John Lindley (British Army officer) (1860–1925), British general
- John Lindley (cinematographer) (born 1951), American cinematographer
- John Lindley (rugby league) (1933–2019) English rugby league footballer who played in the 1950s and 1960s
- John F. Lindley (1918–1971), American politician
