= John Pollitt (disambiguation) =

John Pollitt may refer to

- John Pollitt rugby league footballer (died 1941)
- Jack Pollitt (footballer) (John Pollitt, 1937-2009), English footballer, see List of Bury F.C. players (1–24 appearances)

== See also ==
- Jack Pollitt, rugby league footballer, see List of Wakefield Trinity players
