= Harry Hudson =

Harry Hudson may refer to:

- Harry Hudson (rugby league) (fl. 1920s–1930s), English rugby league player
- Harry Hudson (musician) (born 1993), American singer-songwriter of folk rock and pop music
- Harry Hudson (cyclist) (born 2007), British road cyclist
- Harry Hudson, half of the musical duo "Kirkby and Hudson" who were popular in the 1910s and 1920s

== See also ==
- Henry Hudson (c. 1565–disappeared 1611), English sea explorer and navigator
- Harry Hodson (1906–1999), English economist and editor
