= Arthur Atkinson (rugby league) =

Great Britain and England international rugby league footballer

- Ogden's cigarette card featuring Atkinson

Personal information
- Born: 5 April 1906 Castleford, England
- Died: 1963 (aged 56–57)

Playing information
- Height: 6 ft 0 in (1.83 m)
- Weight: 14 st 4 lb (91 kg)
- Position: Centre
Club
Years	Team	Pld	T	G	FG	P
1925–26	Castleford
1926–40	Castleford	431	157	230	1	933
	Total	431	157	230	1	933
Representative
Years	Team	Pld	T	G	FG	P
1929–36	Yorkshire	14	4	10	0	22
1929–36	England	7	3	0	0	9
1929–36	Great Britain	11	6	0	0	18

Coaching information
Club
Years	Team	Gms	W	D	L	W%
1948–49	Halifax RLFC	0	0	0	0

Arthur Atkinson (5 April 1906 – 1963), also known by the nickname of 'Bruss', was an English professional rugby league footballer who played, mostly as a centre, from 1925 to 1940. He competed at representative level for Great Britain, England and Yorkshire, and at club level for Castleford. He was captain of his club for some time.

Some believe Atkinson holds the world record for a goal kick in any form of rugby because he kicked a penalty from 75 yards (69 m) in the 20-10 victory over St. Helens at their Knowsley Road ground on 26 October 1929. However, England and Cumberland forward Martin Hodgson kicked a penalty goal 77.75 yards (71.09 m) for Swinton against Rochdale Hornets at the Athletic Grounds, Rochdale on 13 April 1940.

== Playing career ==
=== Club career ===
Atkinson, who was 6 feet 0 inches (183 cm) tall, said he had not seen a rugby ball until the age of 17. He was introduced to the sport by William Asquith, who suggested as they were going home from work at a coal pit that they should detour to watch Castleford training at their old ground. He was spotted by Walter Smith, Castleford's representative on the Yorkshire County Committee and a member of the Rugby League Council, as being "a big, likely sort of lad". Smith encouraged him to join in on the spot using borrowed kit. He was in the club's A-Team as a prop for the next game, against Brotherton St Johns, and played a few more times that season. (Note: Atkinson signed for Castleford as a junior player in August 1925 and was given £5.) In the following season, he played more frequently for the team, sometimes as a fullback, and had his first match for the senior side against Windhill, when he played one half as a second-row and the other as full-back. When Castleford became a professional club for the following 1926–27 season, Atkinson played as a wing for a while before becoming the regular full-back for three seasons. His switch to what became his regular position as a centre came shortly before he was first selected for a representative side in 1929.

In August 1928 his request to be put on the transfer list was granted. He was still at the club a year later when the decision was made to sign his 18-year-old brother, Joseph.

Atkinson was Castleford's captain from around 1930. Under his leadership, the club won the Yorkshire County League in the 1932–33 season. That success included six "doubles" (home and away victories) over opposing teams and an unbeaten record at home, where the only opponent to come away with any league points was the York club. They won the same competition in the 1938–39 season, although he missed a large part of the campaign after injuring his leg in a match at Warrington in January 1939, which eventually resulted in him needing an operation to remove cartilage in March of that year.

The league match against Wakefield Trinity in February 1934 was designated a benefit match for Atkinson, (Note: Atkinson was unable to play in his 1934 benefit match due to a leg injury received in the preceding game. Around 7000 people attended the event.) who was in his tenth season at the club.

Playing as captain at right-centre, Atkinson scored a conversion in Castleford's 11-8 victory over Huddersfield in the 1935 Challenge Cup final at Wembley Stadium, London on 4 May 1935, in front of a crowd of 39,000. In September that year, in one of the first matches of the new season, he and David Morgan Jenkins, a Dewsbury player, were sent off.

Atkinson joined the Royal Air Force in December 1940. His 431 appearances for Castleford, mean that he is joint-second (along with Dean Sampson) in the club's all-time appearance list behind John Joyner, who has 613-appearances. He is an inductee of the Castleford Tigers Hall of Fame.

=== County honours ===
Artie Atkinson won caps, generally playing centre, for Yorkshire in the 17-22 defeat by Glamorgan & Monmouth in Cardiff on 15 April 1929, scoring one try, and a goal in the 12-25 defeat by Australia at Wakefield Trinity's stadium on 20 November 1929, the 9-3 victory over Cumberland at Huddersfield's stadium on 22 January 1930, the 6-13 defeat by Glamorgan & Monmouth at Hunslet's stadium on 26 February 1930, the 25-15 victory over Lancashire at Wakefield Trinity's stadium on 18 October 1930, scoring a try, and six conversions in the 33-12 victory over Glamorgan & Monmouth at Halifax's stadium on 15 April 1931, scoring a conversion in the 8-11 defeat by Lancashire at Warrington's stadium on 17 October 1931, playing on the wing in the 20-35 defeat by Cumberland at York's stadium on 28 October 1931, scoring a try in the 10-39 defeat by Cumberland at Whitehaven's stadium on 1 October 1932, scoring a try and two conversions in the 30-3 victory over Lancashire at Wakefield Trinity's stadium on 29 October 1932, the 0-10 defeat by Cumberland at Whitehaven's stadium on 29 September 1934, the 5-5 draw with Lancashire at Leeds' stadium on 9 January 1935, the 16-5 victory over Lancashire at Widnes' stadium on 12 October 1935, and the 6-28 defeat by Lancashire at Castleford's stadium on 21 October 1936.

=== International honours ===
Artie Atkinson won caps for England, playing against Other Nationalities in 1929 and 1930, against Wales in 1931 and 1932, against Australia in 1933 and against France in 1936. He also won caps for Great Britain against Australia (three matches in 1929-30, another three in 1932, followed by one in 1933 and another in 1936), as well as three matches against New Zealand in 1932.

Atkinson said after his first Test experience, in November 1929,

I have enjoyed every minute of my first Test. Different altogether from a club game. You've got to be at it right from the first to the last - there are no quiet spells. But it has been the best game I've ever played in.

His journey on the 1932 tour to Australia was marked before his leaving in April by various presentations - mostly monetary and gold items - from his club's directors, supporters and players. His return in September was lauded by the town council, who had organised a civic reception in his honour.

The Yorkshire Evening Post arranged to carry regular weekly reports provided by Atkinson, Jim Brough and Harry Sunderland during the 1936 Australasia tour.

== Personal life ==
Atkinson married Winifred Dix on 16 November 1932. He took ownership of the Keel Inn, Castleford, around the same time. In 1937, he and his wife faced several charges after a police raid at the pub in August found them selling alcoholic drinks outside licensed hours. She was fined and the charges against him were dismissed provided that he paid court costs.

In 1938, Atkinson. who occasionally also played cricket, stood unsuccessfully as an independent candidate in elections for Castleford council. He was placed fourth out of five in the Wheldale ward, behind three Labour candidates.

== See also ==
- List of Castleford Tigers players
