= Brian Marsden =

Brian Marsden may refer to:

- Brian Marsden (rugby league), rugby league footballer of the 1960s
- Brian Marsden (weightlifter) (born 1947), weightlifter from New Zealand
- Brian G. Marsden (1937–2010), British astronomer
