= Roy Ward =

Roy Ward may refer to:

- Roy Ward (rugby league), British rugby league player
- Roy Ward (politician) (1923–2006), Australian politician
- Roy Lee Ward
- Roy Duane Ward (1964–2026), American baseball player
