= Colin Taylor =

Colin Taylor may refer to:

- Colin Taylor (footballer, born 1940) (1940–2005), English footballer for Walsall F.C.
- Colin Taylor (footballer, born 1971), English footballer for Wolverhampton Wanderers
- Colin Taylor (rugby league) (born 1938), English rugby league player
- Colin Taylor (Neighbours)

== See also ==
- Collin Taylor (born 1987), arena football player
