= Arthur Sherwood (rugby league) =

English rugby league footballer

Personal information
- Born: c. 1894
- Died: October 1952 (aged 58)

Playing information
Club
Years	Team	Pld	T	G	FG	P
1914–28	Huddersfield
1928–34	Castleford	183	8	9	0	42
	Total	183	8	9	0	42
Representative
Years	Team	Pld	T	G	FG	P
1919	Yorkshire	1	0	0	0	0

Arthur Sherwood was a professional rugby league footballer who played in the 1920s and 1930s. He played at club level for Castleford.

== Playing career ==
Sherwood began his career with Huddersfield, and was awarded a benefit match in 1928. Later that year, he was transferred to Castleford.

Sherwood played in Castleford's victory in the Yorkshire League during the 1932–33 season.
