= Donald Knowles (rugby league) =

English dual-code rugby & soccer footballer

Personal information
- Full name: Donald Knowles

Playing information
- Height: 6 ft 0 in (1.83 m)
- Weight: 13 st 4 lb (84 kg)

Rugby union
Club
Years	Team	Pld	T	G	FG	P
≤1932–32	Castleford RUFC

Rugby league
- Position: Wing, Centre, Second-row, Loose forward
Club
Years	Team	Pld	T	G	FG	P
1932–36	Castleford	38	8	0	0	24
≥1935–≤37	Newcastle RLFC
	Total	38	8	0	0	24

Donald Knowles was a rugby union player who turned professional to play rugby league for Castleford in 1932. He later played briefly for Newcastle, and then played association football for Hertford Town.

== Playing career ==
Donald Knowles joined Castleford rugby league club from Castleford RUFC (in Castleford, Wakefield), the town's rugby union club during December 1932, during the 1931–32 season, as a wing, centre, second-row or loose forward. Aged 22 at the time of switching codes, he had previously played rugby union for Huddersfield College and York St John's College. He was 6 feet (1.8 m) tall and weighed 13 stone 4 pounds (84 kg) and had been selected for trials for the county's union team.

Knowles made his rugby league début in the match between Castleford and Hull F.C. on 17 December 1932. During his first season at Castleford, the club won the Yorkshire County League. During February 1934, he was granted his request to be listed for transfer, with the fee being set at £150. He was still at the club during November 1935, when it was announced that he was soon to leave to take up a teaching appointment in Blaydon-on-Tyne. At that time he was deputising for the injured Ted Sadler.

== Personal ==
The engagement of Knowles, who was a second son, to Greta Lamb of Castleford was announced during December, prior to his leaving the club. The marriage took place at Whitwood Mere Parish Church during May 1937, at which time his parents were living in Scarborough. He had played rugby league briefly for Newcastle while teaching in County Durham, and by the time of his wedding was teaching in Hertfordshire, where he was also playing association football as a centre-half with Hertford Town in the Spartan League.

== See also ==
- List of Castleford Tigers players
