= James Plimmer =

English rugby league footballer

Personal information
- Born: second 1/4 1901 Pontefract district, England
- Died: unknown

Playing information
Club
Years	Team	Pld	T	G	FG	P
1926–36	Castleford	158	1	0	0	3

James Plimmer (second 1/4 1901 – death unknown) was an English professional rugby league footballer who played in the 1920s and 1930s. He played at club level for Castleford.

== Background ==
James Plimmer's birth was registered in Pontefract district, West Riding of Yorkshire, England.

== Playing career ==
=== County League appearances ===
James Plimmer played in Castleford's victory in the Yorkshire League during the 1932–33 season.
