= William Asquith =

English rugby league footballer

Nat Asquith
Personal information
- Full name: William Asquith

Playing information
- Position: Centre, Wing
Club
Years	Team	Pld	T	G	FG	P
1926–30	Castleford RLFC	0	0	0	0	0
- As of 27 April 2021

William "Nat" Asquith was a rugby league footballer who played for Castleford from September 1926. He introduced Arthur Atkinson to the sport when he suggested as they were going home from work at a coal pit that they should detour to watch Castleford training at their old ground. When Castleford became a professional club for the 1926–27 season, Asquith made his debut in their 4 September 1926 defeat by Hunslet. A newspaper report of 1929 commented that he and Atkinson were "usually a strong confederacy on the Castleford right wing" while Robin Adair wrote a year later in the Hull Daily Mail that he thought Asquith was "destined for higher honours".

Asquith was hospitalised after the match against Featherstone Rovers on 25 December 1930, when he suffered a ruptured spleen. He did not play again, nor had he been able to work at the time when his club arranged a benefit match for him against Halifax in April 1934.

== See also ==
- List of Castleford Tigers players
