= George Howard (rugby league) =

English rugby league footballer

Playing information
Club
Years	Team	Pld	T	G	FG	P
1948–59	Castleford	325	17	0	0	51

George Howard is a former professional rugby league footballer who played in the 1940s and 1950s. He played at club level for Castleford (Heritage No.).
