= Kenneth Brookes =

English rugby league footballer

Playing information
Club
Years	Team	Pld	T	G	FG	P
1940–46	Castleford	84	18	41	0	136

Kenneth Brookes is a former professional rugby league footballer who played in the 1940s. He played at club level for Castleford (Heritage No. 199).
