= Clifford Harling =

English rugby league footballer

Cliff Harling
Personal information
- Full name: Clifford Harling
- Born: first 1/4 1907; Pontefract district, England
- Died: unknown

Playing information
Club
Years	Team	Pld	T	G	FG	P
1930–34	Castleford	22	2	0	0	6

Clifford Harling (first 1/4 1907 – unknown) was an English professional rugby league footballer who played in the 1930s. He played at club level for Castleford.

== County League appearances ==
Clifford Harling's birth was registered in Pontefract district, West Riding of Yorkshire, England.

== Playing career ==
=== County League appearances ===
Clifford Harling played in Castleford's victory in the Yorkshire League during the 1932–33 season.
