= Albert Leese =

English rugby league footballer

Playing information
Club
Years	Team	Pld	T	G	FG	P
1929–34	Castleford	10	1	0	0	3

Albert Leese was a professional rugby league footballer who played in the 1920s and 1930s. He played at club level for Castleford.

== Playing career ==
=== County League appearances ===
Albert Leese played in Castleford's victory in the Yorkshire League during the 1932–33 season.
