= Joseph Malkin =

English rugby league footballer

Playing information
Club
Years	Team	Pld	T	G	FG	P
1926–33	Castleford	79	11	1	0	35

Joseph Malkin was a professional rugby league footballer who played in the 1920s and 1930s. He played at club level for Castleford.

== Playing career ==
=== County League appearances ===
Joseph Malkin played in Castleford's victory in the Yorkshire League during the 1932–33 season.

=== Club career ===
Joseph Malkin made his début for Castleford in the 0-22 defeat by Hull F.C. on Saturday 28 August 1926.
