= Harry Hand =

English rugby league footballer

Playing information
Club
Years	Team	Pld	T	G	FG	P
1930–34	Castleford	17	0	0	0	0

Harry Hand was a professional rugby league footballer who played in the 1930s. He played at club level for Castleford.

== Playing career ==
=== County League appearances ===
Harry Hand played in Castleford's victory in the Yorkshire League during the 1932–33 season.
