= Harold Chapman (rugby league) =

English rugby league footballer

Playing information
- Position: Wing
Club
Years	Team	Pld	T	G	FG	P
1927–34	Castleford	111	31	0	0	93

Harold Chapman was a professional rugby league footballer who played in the 1920s and 1930s. He played at club level for Castleford, as a wing.

== Playing career ==
=== County League appearances ===
Harold Chapman played in Castleford's victory in the Yorkshire League during the 1932–33 season.

=== Club career ===
Harold Chapman played in Castleford's defeat by Dewsbury in the 1929 Challenge Cup semi-final during 1928–29 season.
