= Harry Russell (rugby league) =

English rugby league footballer

Playing information
Club
Years	Team	Pld	T	G	FG	P
1926–34	Castleford	17	0	0	0	0

Harry Russell was a professional rugby league footballer who played in the 1920s and 1930s. He played at club level for Castleford.

== Playing career ==
=== County League appearances ===
Harry Russell played in Castleford's victory in the Yorkshire League during the 1932–33 season.

=== Club career ===
Harry Russell made his début for Castleford in the 0-3 defeat by the Rochdale Hornets on Wednesday 1 September 1926.
