= William Hayes (rugby league) =

English rugby league footballer

Playing information
- Position: Stand-off, Scrum-half
Club
Years	Team	Pld	T	G	FG	P
1931–45	Castleford	23	2	0	0	6
1932–34	Featherstone Rovers	70	13	0	0	39
	Total	93	15	0	0	45

William Hayes was a professional rugby league footballer who played in the 1930s and 1940s. He played at club level for Castleford, and Featherstone Rovers, as a stand-off, or scrum-half.

== Playing career ==
=== County League appearances ===
William Hayes played in Castleford's victories in the Yorkshire League during the 1932–33 season, and 1938–39 season.

=== Club career ===
William Hayes made his début for Featherstone Rovers on Saturday 9 January 1932.
