= Fred Wadsworth (rugby league) =

English rugby league footballer

Playing information
Club
Years	Team	Pld	T	G	FG	P
1931–33	Castleford	81	16	0	0	9

Fred Wadsworth was a professional rugby league footballer who played in the 1930s. He played at club level for Castleford.

== Playing career ==
=== County League appearances ===
Fred Wadsworth played in Castleford's victory in the Yorkshire League during the 1932–33 season.
