= Fred Brindle =

England international rugby league footballer

Personal information
- Full name: Frederick Brindle
- Born: c. 1908; Sculcoates district, England
- Died: 1983 (aged 75); South Africa

Playing information
- Position: Loose forward
Club
Years	Team	Pld	T	G	FG	P
≤1933–Jan 33	Hull Kingston Rovers	108	12	5	0	46
Jan 1933–≥33	Huddersfield
1937–47	Castleford	81	14	0	0	42
	Total	189	26	5	0	88
Representative
Years	Team	Pld	T	G	FG	P
1938	Yorkshire	1
1933	England	1	1	0	0	3

Frederick Brindle (c. 1908 – 1983) was an English professional rugby league footballer who played in the 1930s and 1940s. He played at representative level for England and Yorkshire, and at club level for Hull Kingston Rovers, Huddersfield and Castleford, as a loose forward.

== Background ==
Fred Brindle's birth was registered in Sculcoates district, East Riding of Yorkshire, England.

== Playing career ==
=== Club career ===
Fred Brindle played in Castleford's victory in the Yorkshire League during the 1938–39 season.

Fred Brindle played loose forward and scored a try in Huddersfield's 21–17 victory over Warrington in the 1933 Challenge Cup Final during the 1932–33 season at Wembley Stadium, London on Saturday 6 May 1933.

=== Representative honours ===
Fred Brindle won a cap for England while at Huddersfield in 1933 against Other Nationalities.

Fred Brindle played loose forward in Yorkshire's 9-10 defeat by Lancashire at Athletic Grounds, Rochdale on Saturday 12 February 1938.
