= Roy Appleyard =

English rugby league footballer

Personal information
- Born: second 1/4 1950 (age 74–75); Lower Agbrigg, Wakefield, England

Playing information
Club
Years	Team	Pld	T	G	FG	P
1968–74	Castleford	67	17	47	0	145
1981–83	Hunslet RLFC	30	4	0	2	14
	Total	97	21	47	2	159

Roy Appleyard (birth registered second 1/4 1950) is an English former professional rugby league footballer who played in the 1960s and 1970s. He played at club level for Normanton ARLFC, and Castleford (Heritage No. 517).

== Background ==
Roy Appleyard's birth was registered in Lower Agbrigg, Wakefield, West Riding of Yorkshire, England.
