= Tom Dennis (rugby league) =

English rugby league footballer

Playing information
Club
| Years | Team | Pld | T | G | FG | P |
|---|---|---|---|---|---|---|
| 1932–34 | Castleford | 8 | 0 | 0 | 0 | 0 |
| 1934–38 | Featherstone Rovers | 86 | 10 | 12 | 0 | 54 |
| | Total | 94 | 10 | 12 | 0 | 54 |

Tom Dennis was a professional rugby league footballer who played in the 1930s. He played at club level for Castleford, and Featherstone Rovers.

== Playing career ==
=== County League appearances ===
Tom Dennis played in Castleford's victory in the Yorkshire League during the 1932–33 season.

=== Club career ===
Tom Dennis made his début for Featherstone Rovers on Saturday 3 February 1934, and he played his last match for Featherstone Rovers during the 1937–38 season.
