= Geoff Briggs =

English rugby league footballer

Personal information
- Full name: Geoffrey Briggs

Playing information
Club
| Years | Team | Pld | T | G | FG | P |
|---|---|---|---|---|---|---|
| 1945–47 | Castleford | 36 | 0 | 59 | 0 | 118 |

Geoff Briggs is a former professional rugby league footballer who played in the 1940s. He played at club level for Castleford.
