= Clifford Burton (rugby league, born c. 1903) =

England international rugby league footballer

Personal information
- Full name: Clifford Arthur Burton
- Born: c. 1903 Wakefield, England
- Died: 1943 Wakefield, England

Playing information
- Position: Prop, Second-row
Club
Years	Team	Pld	T	G	FG	P
1925–26	Batley
1926–33	Keighley
1933–34	Bradford Northern	9	1	0	0	3
	Total	9	1	0	0	3
Representative
Years	Team	Pld	T	G	FG	P
1929–30	Yorkshire	2	0	0	0	0
1930	England	1	0	0	0	0

Clifford Arthur Burton (c. 1903 – 1943) was an English professional rugby league footballer who played as a prop or second-row forward. He made one international appearance for England in 1930, and played at club level for Batley, Keighley and Bradford Northern.

== Biography ==
Born in Wakefield, Burton began playing rugby league for Batley, making his debut in September 1925. He was signed by Keighley in December 1926.

In November 1929, Burton represented Yorkshire in a match against Australia during the 1929–30 Kangaroo tour of Great Britain. In April 1930, he made his first and only appearance for England in a defeat against Other Nationalities.

In December 1933, he was transferred to Bradford Northern.

He died in Wakefield in 1943.
