= Ray Newton =

English rugby league footballer

Playing information
Club
Years	Team	Pld	T	G	FG	P
1970–78	Castleford	185	46	0	0	138

Ray Newton is a former professional rugby league footballer who played in the 1970s. He played at club level for Castleford.
