= Wilfred Boucher =

English rugby league footballer

Wilfred J. Boucher
Playing information
Club
Years	Team	Pld	T	G	FG	P
1935–46	Castleford	14	3	3	0	15

Wilfred J. Boucher was a professional rugby league footballer who played in the 1930s and 1940s. He played at the club level for Castleford.

== Playing career ==
=== County League appearances ===
Wilfred Boucher played in Castleford's victory in the Yorkshire League during the 1938–39 season.
