= Alan Horsfall =

English rugby league footballer

Personal information
- Full name: Allan Horsfall
- Born: 5 August 1926 Leeds, England
- Died: 24 May 2007 (aged 80) Leeds, England

Playing information
- Position: Prop
Club
Years	Team	Pld	T	G	FG	P
1945–55	Leeds	77	7			21
1955–58	Castleford	53	3	0	0	9
	Total	130	10	0	0	30
- Source: leedsrugby.dnsupdate.co.uk

Alan or Allan Horsfall (5 August 1926 – 24 May 2007) was an English professional rugby league footballer who played in the 1940s and 1950s. He played at club level for Leeds and Castleford, as a prop.

== Playing career ==
Alan Horsfall's début for Leeds came in the 17–32 defeat by Wigan at Headingley on 24 November 1945, he was transferred to Castleford on Monday 10 January 1955 in part-exchange for Joe Anderson, and was the bag man for the Leeds teams of the 1970s, and early 1980s.
