= Ronald Evans (rugby league) =

English rugby league footballer

Ron Evans
- Ronald Evans prior to Castleford's 21-18 victory over Batley at Mount Pleasant, Batley on Tuesday 19 August 1958

Personal information
- Full name: Ronald Evans
- Born: second ¼ 1933 Pontefract district, England
- Died: 31 October 2010 (aged 77) Castleford, England

Playing information
- Position: Scrum-half
Club
Years	Team	Pld	T	G	FG	P
1950–56	Wakefield Trinity	72	12	1	0	38
1956–61	Castleford	90	8	0	0	24
	Total	162	20	1	0	62

Ronald "Ron" Evans (birth registered second ¼ 1933 – 31 October 2010), also known by the nickname of "Curly", was an English professional rugby league footballer who played in the 1950s and 1960s. He played at club level for Wakefield Trinity and Castleford, as a scrum-half.

== Background ==
Ron Evans' birth was registered in Pontefract district, West Riding of Yorkshire, England, he lived in Ferry Fryston, Castleford c. 2010, he died aged 77 in Castleford, West Yorkshire, England, his funeral service took place at Holy Cross Church, Castleford, at 12.15 pm on Monday 8 November 2010. followed by an interment at Castleford Cemetery.

== Playing career ==
=== Club career ===
Ron Evans made his début for Wakefield Trinity during November 1950, and he played his last match for Wakefield Trinity during the 1955–56 season.

== Personal life ==
Ron Evans was the brother-in-law of the rugby league footballer Don Robinson.
