= Maurice Williams (rugby league) =

English rugby league footballer

Personal information
- Born: second 1/4 1942 (age 83–84) Pontefract district, England
- Died: 4th July 2023

Playing information
Club
Years	Team	Pld	T	G	FG	P
1961–65	Castleford	16	0	0	0	0

Maurice Williams (birth registered second 1/4 1942) was an English former professional rugby league footballer who played in the 1960s. He played at club level for Castleford.

== Background ==
Maurice Williams' birth was registered in Pontefract district, West Riding of Yorkshire, England.

== Playing career ==
=== County League appearances ===
Maurice Williams played in Castleford's victory in the Yorkshire League during the 1964–65 season.
