= Trevor Waring =

English rugby league footballer

Personal information
- Born: third 1/4 1945 (age 79–80); Pontefract district, England

Playing information
Club
Years	Team	Pld	T	G	FG	P
1964–67	Castleford	8	4	0	0	12

Trevor Waring (birth registered third 1/4 1945) is an English former professional rugby league footballer who played in the 1960s. He played at club level for Castleford.

== Background ==
Trevor Waring's birth was registered in Pontefract district, West Riding of Yorkshire, England.

== Playing career ==
=== County League appearances ===
Trevor Waring played in Castleford's victory in the Yorkshire League during the 1964–65.
