= Illtyd Williams =

Welsh rugby league footballer

Illtyd M. Williams
Playing information
Club
Years	Team	Pld	T	G	FG	P
1937–39	Castleford	9	2	0	0	6

Illtyd M. Williams was a professional rugby league footballer who played in the 1930s. He played at club level for Castleford.

== Playing career ==
=== County League appearances ===
Illtyd Williams played in Castleford's victory in the Yorkshire League during the 1938–39 season.
