= Joe Anderson (rugby league) =

English rugby league footballer

Personal information
- Full name: Joseph T. Anderson
- Born: 1928; Monk Fryston, England
- Died: 20 December 2014 (aged 86); England

Playing information
- Position: Prop
Club
Years	Team	Pld	T	G	FG	P
1948–55	Castleford	204	8	0	0	24
1955–58	Leeds	91	4	0	0	12
1958–61	Featherstone Rovers	47	0	0	0	0
	Total	342	12	0	0	36
Representative
Years	Team	Pld	T	G	FG	P
1952–54	Yorkshire	3	0	0	0	0

Joseph T. Anderson (1928 – 20 December 2014), also known by the nickname of 'Ginger', was an English professional rugby league footballer who played in the 1940s, 1950s and 1960s. He played at representative level for Yorkshire, and at club level for Castleford, Leeds and Featherstone Rovers, as a prop.

Anderson was born in Monk Fryston, and his birth was registered in Tadcaster district, West Riding of Yorkshire, England, he founded JT Anderson Transport Ltd of Gateforth, Selby, he died aged 86 of kidney cancer, his funeral service took place at Holy Cross Church, Fryston Road, Airedale, Castleford, at 2 pm on Thursday 8 January 2015, with a committal at Pontefract Crematorium, Wakefield Road, Pontefract at 2.45 pm, followed by a reception at The Carleton Hotel, Pontefract.

== Playing career ==
=== County honours ===
Anderson won caps playing at prop for Yorkshire while at Castleford in the 16–8 victory over Lancashire at Hull FC's stadium on 28 April 1953, the 16–7 victory over Cumberland at Hull FC's stadium on 5 October 1953, and the 10–18 defeat by Lancashire at Leigh's stadium on 14 October 1953.

=== Challenge Cup Final appearances ===
Anderson played at prop in Leeds' 9–7 victory over Barrow in the 1956–57 Challenge Cup Final during the 1956–57 season at Wembley Stadium, London on Saturday 11 May 1957, in front of a crowd of 76,318.

=== County Cup Final appearances ===
Anderson played at prop in Featherstone Rovers' 15–14 victory over Hull F.C. in the 1959–60 Yorkshire Cup Final during the 1959–60 season at Headingley, Leeds on Saturday 31 October 1959.

=== Club career ===
Anderson was transferred from Castleford to Leeds on Monday 10 January 1955 for £1,700 (based on increases in average earnings, this would be approximately £96,810 in 2013), plus Alan Horsfall in part-exchange, he made his début for Leeds against Featherstone Rovers at Headingley, Leeds on Saturday 15 January 1955, he was transferred from Leeds to Featherstone Rovers during 1958, he made his début for Featherstone Rovers on Wednesday 20 August 1958, and he played his last match for Featherstone Rovers during the 1960–61 season.
