= Bill Renton =

English rugby league footballer

Personal information
- Full name: William Renton

Playing information
- Position: Prop
Club
Years	Team	Pld	T	G	FG	P
1926–28	Castleford	89	4	0	0	12
1928–35	Halifax	233	3	0	0	9
	Total	322	7	0	0	21
Representative
Years	Team	Pld	T	G	FG	P
1928–35	Yorkshire	7	0	0	0	0

Bill Renton was a professional rugby league footballer who played in the 1920s. He played at representative level for Yorkshire, and at club level for Castleford, as a prop.

== Playing career ==
=== Club career ===
Renton made his début for Castleford in the 0-22 defeat by Hull F.C. on 28 August 1926. He transferred to Halifax in December 1928.

=== County honours ===
Renton won a cap playing at prop for Yorkshire while at Castleford in the 10-33 defeat by Lancashire at Halifax's stadium on 3 November 1928.
