= Paul Orr =

English rugby league footballer

Playing information
Club
Years	Team	Pld	T	G	FG	P
1975–82	Castleford	108	16	38	0	124
1982–≥83	York
	Total	108	16	38	0	124

Paul Orr is a former professional rugby league footballer who played in the 1970s and 1980s. He played at club level for Castleford, and York.
