= Tom Haberecht =

Australian rugby league footballer

Personal information
- Full name: Tom Haberecht
- Born: 17 May 1985 (age 40); Sydney, New South Wales, Australia

Playing information
- Position: Centre, Second-row
Club
Years	Team	Pld	T	G	FG	P
2008	Castleford Tigers	5	1	0	0	4
2009	York City Knights	21	12	1	0	50
	Total	26	13	1	0	54
- Source: As of 9 March 2012

Tom Haberecht (born 17 May 1985) is an Australian former professional rugby league footballer who played in the 2000s. He has played for the Canterbury-Bankstown Bulldogs, the St. George Illawarra Dragons, the Western Suburbs Magpies, the Castleford Tigers in Super League and the York City Knights, as a centre or second-row.

== Background ==
Haberecht was born in Sydney, New South Wales, Australia.

== Career ==
Due to quota restrictions, he was released from his Castleford contract on 12 June 2008, following the signing of Mitchell Sargent.
