= Jack Boot =

English rugby league footballer

Playing information
Club
Years	Team	Pld	T	G	FG	P
1954–58	Castleford	53	0	0	0	0

Jack Boot is a former professional rugby league footballer who played in the 1950s. He played at club level for Castleford.
