= Robert Taylor (rugby league) =

English rugby league footballer

Playing information
Club
Years	Team	Pld	T	G	FG	P
1958–60	Castleford	32	18	0	0	54

Robert Taylor is a former professional rugby league footballer who played in the 1950s and 1960s. He played at club level for Castleford.
