= Richard Walton (rugby league) =

English rugby league footballer

Playing information
Club
Years	Team	Pld	T	G	FG	P
1926–40	Castleford	201	9	0	0	27

Richard Walton was a professional rugby league footballer who played in the 1920s, 1930s and 1940s. He played at club level for Castleford.

== Playing career ==
=== County League appearances ===
Richard Walton played in Castleford's victories in the Yorkshire League during the 1932–33 season, and 1938–39 season.
