= Dick Walton =

English footballer

Personal information
- Full name: Richard Walton
- Date of birth: 12 September 1924
- Place of birth: Kingston upon Hull, England
- Date of death: 23 June 2012 (aged 87)
- Place of death: Deal, England
- Position: Right back

Senior career*
Years	Team	Apps	(Gls)
1942–1948	Leicester City	0	(0)
1948–1951	Leyton Orient	63	(4)
1951–1956	Exeter City	135	(6)
1956–1959	Tonbridge	78	(1)
- Sittingbourne
- * Club domestic league appearances and goals

Richard Walton (12 September 1924 – 23 June 2012) was an English professional footballer who made over 130 appearances in the Football League for Exeter City as a right back. He also played League football for Leyton Orient.

== Personal life ==
Walton later worked as an assistant accountant in Kent.

== Career statistics ==
Appearances and goals by club, season and competition
Club	Season	League			National cup (Note: Includes FA Cup)		Other		Total	
Club	Season	Division	Apps	Goals	Apps	Goals	Apps	Goals	Apps	Goals
Tonbridge	1956–57	Southern League	36	0	1	0	13 (Note: 6 appearances in Southern League Cup, 5 appearances in Kent Senior Cup, 2 appearances in Kent Senior Shield)	0	50	0
Tonbridge	1957–58	Southern League	31	1	1	0	6 (Note: 3 appearances in Southern League Cup, 2 appearances in Kent Senior Cup, 1 appearances in Kent Senior Shield)	0	38	1
Tonbridge	1958–59	Southern League South East Division	11	0	0	0	9 (Note: 5 appearances in Kent Senior Cup, 3 appearances in Southern League Cup, 1 appearance in Southern League Zonal Cup)	0	20	0
Career total			78	1	2	0	28	0	108	0
