= Clifford Burton (cricketer) =

English cricketer

Clifford Burton (15 June 1931 – 20 May 1978) was an English cricketer active from 1956 to 1957 who played for Lancashire. He was born in Manchester and died in Oldham. He appeared in two first-class matches, scoring no runs, and held two catches.
