= Richard R. Walton =

American inventor (1909–1993)

Richard R. Walton (1909 - June 24, 1993) was an American inventor credited with the invention of six-pack containers, agitating devices for cloth washers, an apparatus to shrink-proof clothes, and the first machine to pick a single layer of fabric from a stack of cloth.
