= Clifford Burton (rugby league, Castleford) =

English rugby league footballer

Playing information
Club
Years	Team	Pld	T	G	FG	P
1954–59	Castleford	107	31	0	0	93

Clifford Burton is a former professional rugby league footballer who played in the 1950s. He played at club level for Castleford.
