= Brian Marsden (rugby league) =

English rugby league footballer

Playing information
Club
| Years | Team | Pld | T | G | FG | P |
|---|---|---|---|---|---|---|
| 1959 | Featherstone Rovers | 1 | 1 | 0 | 0 | 3 |
| 1960–63 | Castleford | 57 | 13 | 0 | 0 | 39 |
| | Total | 58 | 14 | 0 | 0 | 42 |

Brian Marsden is a former professional rugby league footballer who played in the 1960s. He played at club level for Featherstone Rovers briefly then Castleford.
