= William Hargrave (rugby league) =

English rugby league footballer

Personal information
- Born: unknown
- Died: unknown

Playing information
- Position: Wing
Club
Years	Team	Pld	T	G	FG	P
1926–30	Castleford	108	22	83	2	236
Representative
Years	Team	Pld	T	G	FG	P
15 Apr 1929	Yorkshire	1	0	0	0	0

William Hargrave (birth unknown – death unknown) was a professional rugby league footballer who played in the 1920s and 1930s. He played at representative level for Yorkshire, and at club level for Castleford, as a wing.

== Playing career ==
=== County honours ===
William Hargrave won a cap for Yorkshire while at Castleford, he played on the wing in the 17–22 defeat by Glamorgan & Monmouth at Cardiff on 15 April 1929.

=== Club career ===
William Hargrave made his début for Castleford in the 0–22 defeat by Hull F.C. on 28 August 1926.
