= John Pollitt =

English rugby league footballer

Personal information
- Died: January 1941

Playing information
Club
Years	Team	Pld	T	G	FG	P
1933–37	Castleford	31	1	58	0	119
1937–40	Featherstone Rovers	75	1	47	0	97
	Total	106	2	105	0	216

John Pollitt was a professional rugby league footballer who played in the 1930s and 1940s. He played at club level for Castleford, and Featherstone Rovers.

== Playing career ==
John Pollitt made his début for Featherstone Rovers on Saturday 28 August 1937.
