= John Lindley (rugby league) =

English rugby league footballer (1933–2019)

Personal information
- Full name: John Lindley
- Born: 20 August 1933 Stanley, Wakefield district, England
- Died: 22 January 2019 (aged 85) Wakefield, England

Playing information
- Weight: 12 st 7 lb (79 kg) → 17 st 7 lb (111 kg)
- Position: Centre, Prop, Second-row
Club
Years	Team	Pld	T	G	FG	P
1951–59	Wakefield Trinity	89	5	0	0	15
1959	St. Helens	6	0	0	0	0
1960–61	Castleford	12	0	0	0	0
1961	York
	Total	107	5	0	0	15

John Lindley (20 August 1933 – 22 January 2019) was an English professional rugby league footballer who played in the 1950s and 1960s. He played at club level for Normanton ARLFC, Stanley Rangers ARLFC, Wakefield Trinity, St. Helens, Castleford and York, initially as a centre and later as a prop or second-row.

== Background ==
John Lindley was born in Stanley, Wakefield, West Riding of Yorkshire, England, his birth was registered in Wakefield district, he lived in Stanley, Wakefield, he was a pupil at St. Austin Catholic School, Wakefield, he played rugby league for Wakefield Schools, he later worked as a plasterer, after an accident at work, and following an operation on his knee, he missed the entire 1952–53 season, he undertook his national service in the Army c. 1956-57, consequently he missed all but 15-matches of the 1955–56 season, 1956–57 season and 1957–58 season, he moved to live in Eastmoor, Wakefield c. 1988, he moved to live in Wrenthorpe, Wakefield c. 2008, he died aged 85 in Wakefield, West Yorkshire, England, his funeral service (requiem mass) took place at St. Austin's Catholic church at 11am on Monday 4 February 2019, followed by an interment at Stanley cemetery.

== Playing career ==
=== County League appearances ===
John Lindley played in Wakefield Trinity's Yorkshire County League victory during the 1958–59 season.

=== Club career ===
John Lindley made his début for Wakefield Trinity at centre in the 3-10 defeat by Doncaster at York Road Greyhound Stadium, Doncaster on Saturday 18 August 1951, and he played his last match for Wakefield Trinity during the 1959–60 season, he was transferred from Wakefield Trinity to St. Helens on 31 August 1959, he made his début for St. Helens in the 23-9 victory over Leeds at Knowsley Road, St. Helens on Saturday 5 September 1959, and he played his last match for St. Helens in the 25-10 victory over Halifax at Knowsley Road, St. Helens on Saturday 21 November 1959, he was transferred from St. Helens to Castleford, he made his début for Castleford in the 16-5 victory over Bramley at Wheldon Road, Castleford during January 1960, and he played his last match for Castleford during the 1960–61 season, he was transferred from Castleford to York, following recurrent knee injuries, he retired from rugby league aged-28 in c. 1961.

== Note ==
John Lindley should not be confused with the historian of Wakefield Trinity; John Lindley (c. 1932 – 2012 (aged 80)).
