= Colin Taylor (rugby league) =

English rugby league footballer

Personal information
- Full name: Colin Taylor
- Born: 22 June 1938 (age 86); Pontefract, England

Playing information
- Height: 6 ft 0 in (1.83 m)
- Weight: 15 st 0 lb (95 kg)
- Position: Second-row
Club
Years	Team	Pld	T	G	FG	P
1956–64	Castleford	78	7	0	0	21
1964–65	Bradford Northern
1965–65	Hunslet
1965–67	Featherstone Rovers	35+3	2	1	0	8
	Total	116	9	1	0	29

Colin Taylor (born 22 June 1938) is an English former professional rugby league footballer who played in the 1950s and 1960s and coached. He played at club level for Castleford, Bradford Northern, Hunslet and Featherstone Rovers, as a second-row, and coached at club level for Lock Lane ARLFC.

== Background ==
Taylor's birth was registered in Pontefract, West Riding of Yorkshire, England, and he was the landlord of The Magnet public house, 72 Pontefract Road, Castleford.

== Playing career ==
Taylor made his début for Castleford during the 1956–57 season, he was transferred from Castleford to Bradford Northern during/after the 1963–64 season, he was then transferred from Bradford Northern to Hunslet, he was subsequently transferred from Hunslet to Featherstone Rovers for £600 on Tuesday 17 August 1965 (based on inflation, this would be equivalent to £14,674 in 2023) (based on increases in average earnings, this would be approximately equivalent to £20,970 in 2017), he became Featherstone Rovers' first signing from a senior club since Milan Kosanović was transferred from Wakefield Trinity in February 1964, whose transfer fee was also £600, Taylor had been expected to be transferred from Hunslet to Batley, but Featherstone Rovers officials were made aware of his availability, and secured his signature at Lock Lane ARLFC's ground at 7:45pm, he made his début for Featherstone Rovers against Hunslet at Post Office Road, Featherstone on Saturday 21 August 1965.

=== Challenge Cup Final appearances ===
Taylor was an unused substitute (replacing the original interchange/substitute William "Billy" Baldwinson who was injured) in Hunslet's 16–20 defeat by Wigan in the 1965 Challenge Cup Final at Wembley Stadium, London on Saturday 8 May 1965, in front of a crowd of 89,016. and he was a reserve to travel in Featherstone Rovers' 17-12 victory over Barrow in the 1966–67 Challenge Cup Final during the 1966–67 season at Wembley Stadium, London on Saturday 13 May 1967, in front of a crowd of 76,290.
