= 1932–33 Northern Rugby Football League season =

- League: Championship
- Duration: 38 Rounds
- Teams: 28
- Champions: Salford (2nd title)
- League Leaders: Salford
- Runners-up: Swinton
- Top point-scorer(s): (Wales) Jim Sullivan ( Wigan) (307)
- Top try-scorer(s): (Australia) Eric Harris ( Leeds) (57)

The 1932–33 Northern Rugby Football League season was the 38th season of rugby league football. Salford won their second Rugby Football League Championship when they beat Swinton 15-5 in the play-off final. They had also finished the regular season as league leaders. The Challenge Cup winners were Huddersfield who beat Warrington 21-17 in the final. Salford won the Lancashire League, and Castleford won the Yorkshire League. Warrington beat St.Helens 10–9 to win the Lancashire Cup, and Leeds beat Wakefield Trinity 8–0 to win the Yorkshire Cup. This season, Widnes' Jimmy Hoey became rugby league's first player to play and score in every one of his club's matches in an entire season.

== Championship ==
	Team	Pld	W	D	L	PF	PA	Pts
1	Salford	38	31	2	5	751	165	64
2	Swinton	38	26	2	10	412	247	54
3	York	38	24	4	10	571	273	52
4	Wigan	38	25	2	11	717	411	52
5	Warrington	38	26	0	12	625	426	52
6	Barrow	38	24	2	12	508	332	50
7	Hunslet	38	23	0	15	529	365	46
8	Castleford	38	21	4	13	403	326	46
9	Huddersfield	38	21	0	17	504	333	42
10	Leeds	38	20	2	16	544	423	42
11	St. Helens	38	20	2	16	554	494	42
12	Widnes	38	19	2	17	446	406	40
13	Broughton Rangers	38	18	4	16	289	322	40
14	Oldham	38	19	1	18	438	464	39
15	Rochdale Hornets	38	19	1	18	497	533	39
16	St Helens Recs	38	16	4	18	419	416	36
17	Keighley	38	16	3	19	418	428	35
18	Hull	38	16	2	20	467	460	34
19	Wakefield Trinity	38	15	4	19	370	483	34
20	Halifax	38	16	1	21	434	392	33
21	Hull Kingston Rovers	38	15	0	23	383	490	30
22	Bradford Northern	38	14	2	22	377	587	30
23	Leigh	38	15	0	23	364	610	30
24	Dewsbury	38	14	0	24	361	503	28
25	Batley	38	12	1	25	293	450	25
26	Featherstone Rovers	38	8	2	28	302	594	18
27	Wigan Highfield	38	8	2	28	240	734	18
28	Bramley	38	6	1	31	219	768	13

=== Play-off ===
Semi-finals
1	Salford	14
4	Wigan	2
2	Swinton	11
3	York	4

Championship final
Salford	15
Swinton	5

== Challenge Cup ==
Huddersfield beat Warrington 21-17 in the final at Wembley before a crowd of 41,784. This was Huddersfield’s fourth Cup Final win in as many Cup Final appearances, and they became the first team to win the trophy more than three times. This was also the fifth Cup Final defeat for Warrington.

== Sources ==
- 1932-33 Rugby Football League season at wigan.rlfans.com
- The Challenge Cup at The Rugby Football League website
