= 1935 Cup Winners' Match =

1935 Cup Winners' Game
	1	2	Total
LYO	11	10	21
CAS	8	16	24
- Date: 12 May 1935
- Stadium: Stade Buffalo
- Location: Montrouge, Seine, France
- Referee: A.S. Dobson

Broadcast partners
- Broadcasters: n/a

The 1935 Cup Winners' Match was a single-game rugby league football contest pitting Challenge Cup winners Castleford RLFC against Coupe de France winners US Lyon-Villeurbanne on 12 May 1935.

== Background ==
The Rugby Football League of England played an active role in the introduction of its code to France, and was eager to support its fledgling equivalent, the Ligue de Rugby à XIII, by agreeing to many Anglo-French fixtures, which served as both teaching tools and promotional vehicles for the game thanks to the longstanding rivalry between the two countries. A grand final between the winners of both national cups was considered as soon as both organizations started working together on the 1934–35 schedule in May 1934. The date of the game was announced as part of the season's provisional schedule in late August 1934. Paris was chosen as a location in mid-October 1934, once the French Rugby League was guaranteed the use of a stadium by the capital's authorities, initially Vincennes Municipal Stadium. Most Paris games, including this one, were eventually relocated to Stade Buffalo, the league's preferred venue, after it fought back lobbying efforts by the French Rugby Union to bar them access. A game between the French champions Villeneuve and RFL champions Swinton RLFC was also organized in the Bordeaux suburb of Talence. Before both were assigned to French cities, each contest was planned to alternate between a French and a British host. Final confirmation of the event's go-ahead was received by the Brittons in early May, ahead of the Challenge Cup final.

The Castleford players, mostly small-town, working-class men, were apparently delighted with the invitation to visit Paris, as the majority of the non-internationals were said to have never traveled outside of the United Kingdom. Before the game, the French press considered Castleford narrow favorites. The English side was viewed as a surprise Challenge Cup winner while Lyon, although still inexperienced in the new code, was a top French team, evening the odds somewhat. Paris-based daily L'Intransigeant dubbed the upcoming contest Le match des deux coupes (lit. 'The Match of the Two Cups').

=== Lord Derby Cup ceremony ===
At 14:45, a ceremony took place during which the Lord Derby Cup, donated by Edward Stanley, 17th Earl of Derby to serve as the Coupe de France trophy, was officially handed to Lyon-Villeurbanne captain Charles Mathon, who immediately relinquished it to team president Joseph Pansera.

In advance of the game, it was announced that the cup would be presented by Walter Smith, who was Castleford's representative in the RFL council. However, some post-game articles mention that the master of ceremony was RFL general secretary John Wilson himself. The Lord Derby Cup was previously destined to be the trophy of the Cup Winners' Match itself, but during the season it was decided that it would instead go to the French Cup winners. The trophy eventually used for the Cup Winners' Match was presented by the French Rugby League.

The contest that immediately followed did not tamper Lyon-Villeurbanne's celebratory mood. After their narrow defeat against Castleford, Pansera and his players staged a drunken, impromptu parade of the newly minted national cup through the Montmartre district, on their way to the headquarters of sports daily L'Auto, where they used it to serve Champagne to the staff.

== Game summary ==
Lyon and Castleford wore different kits than those with which they have been identified in the modern era; Lyon's was described as red with black stripes, and Castleford's as white with yellow and orange trims.

The game was a see-saw affair. Lyon thought it had opened the score by Lambert, but the try was disallowed due to a forward pass. Right after Castleford temporarily lost Adams on a hit, Arthur Atkinson intercepted the ball deep into the French zone managed to score the try, which was converted. Lyon pushed back and scored a try by Barbazanges, but it was not converted. Sadler then rushed though the Lyon defense to notch a coast-to-coast try that restored a five-point lead for his team. Adkinson managed a second interception and appeared to score, but his try was disallowed as well. Lyon's star Samatan produced a strong individual effort of his own to earn the French team a try, which was converted, making things square again. Atkinson missed a penalty kick, which hit the post. Barnoud recovered from a tackle by Lewis to score a corner try which, despite a missed conversion, gave Lyon a surprise 11–8 lead at half time.

Returning from intermission, Castleford took control of the game and dominated much of the next twenty minutes, scoring three successive tries by Croston, Sadler and Cuniffe, only one of which was converted. Lyon recovered late and countered with two tries by Barbazanges and Samatan. Both were converted, allowing the French team to pull even with two minutes to go. However, Lyon's defense broke down in the final moments of the game, and Atkinson scored a power try which, while slightly lucky, was clearly valid and decided the outcome in favor of the guest team on a score of 21–18.

Castleford came as advertised and played a physical game, which some linked to its blue collar ethos and compared to the FC Lézignan team that had taken the French Rugby Union Championship by surprise a few years prior (Lézignan would in fact switch codes a few years later and become a league mainstay). Lyon-Villeurbanne tried its best to contain the opposing pack in the absence of its top forward Joseph Griffard, who was still reeling from an ankle injury and was substituted by Barcella. But the English also showed unexpected flair, and third line player Edward "Ted" Sadler was deemed the best man on the field thanks to his combination of skill and athleticism.

The game was not without controversy, as tempers flared on the field following a rough hand-off by Atkinson. The referee was also criticized for penalizing several scrum feeds by Mathon in the final stretch, which took the momentum away from Lyon. However, the standard of play was praised, with Le Jour calling the game the best seen in Paris all year, and La Dépêche's correspondent pointing that it belied the accusations of some rugby league detractors about its lack of physicality, and was anything but an exhibition. Castleford captain Atkinson was magnanimous in victory, declaring after the game that his squad "did not expect to find in Lyon-Villeurbanne such a brilliant team", although he "nonetheless found the backline superior to the forwards", who "[did] not yet possess the Brittons' experience when its comes to playing scrums".

=== Incident ===
The attitude of the Parisian crowd was a source of criticism. Distracting whistles were directed at the opposing kickers and the referee, which was viewed as distasteful. Following the game, the field was invaded by upset spectators, some of whom threatened the English referee sent by the RFL, A.S. Dobson.

The Huddersfield Daily Examiner called the crowd "unsporting". The French press was in broad agreement. Although Edouard Bardon, writing for Le Jour, thought that the refereeing was too by-the-book, he did not find it in error, and decried that "the public, sadly, did not give as good a showing as the players", blaming its ire on a lack of understanding of the new code's rules. Paris-midi wrote that the crowd displayed "appalling chauvinism". Alex Ancel of Paris-soir wrote: "If we entrusted refereeing duties to a Britton, it is so that we can benefit from his teachings. [...] Lest rugby league fall prey to such deplorable chauvinism at the dawn of its life!" Jean de Lascoumettes, sports editor for L'Intransigeant, penned an opinion piece the day after the game, saying: "We are troubled to see—and hear—people ignorant of the rules of neo-rugby go after a referee who was there precisely to see them followed. There were some regrettable gestures at the field's exit [...] The Brittons have previously judged our public severely. Will we give them a reason to do it again? In an interview given the following year, Dobson commanded the French public for improving its understanding of the game and showing a more civil behaviour.

== Match details ==
12 May 1935
15:00

US Lyon-Villeurbanne	21–24	Castleford RLFC
Tries: Lambert, Samatan (2), Barnoud, Barbazanges; Goals: Amila (3); Penalty: n/a		Tries: Atkinson, Sadler (3), Croston, Cuniffe; Goals: Lewis (2), Atkinson; Penalty: n/a

Stade Buffalo
Referee: A.S. Dobson

=== US Lyon-Villeurbanne ===
Fullback: Henri Marty
Threequarters: René Barnoud, Antonin Barbazanges, Gaston Amila, Laurent Lambert
Halfbacks: Charles Mathon (c), Robert Samatan
Forwards: Gustave Genevet, ? Barcella, Paul Piany, Lucien Lafond, Auguste Anclades, Joseph Perrin

=== Castleford RLFC ===
Fullback: George Lewis
Threequarters: Bernard Cunniffe, Arthur Atkinson (c), James "Jim" A. Croston, Tom Askin
Halfbacks: William H. Davies, Leslie "Les" Adams
Forwards: Edward Sadler, James Crossley, Frank Smith Sr., Patrick B. McManus, Harold Haley, Thomas "Tommy" L. Taylor

== 1936 format change ==
The contest was originally supposed to be an annual event, featuring the current holders of France and England's knockout cups. However, the 1936 Challenge Cup winners Leeds RLFC pulled out of their trip to play Coupe de France winners Côte Basque XIII, citing injuries to seven of their players. The RFL then designated Huddersfield C & AC, one of its better teams, to replace them. However, Huddersfield pulled out as well, arguing that it had stopped training three weeks prior, and would be missing two of its top stars: Australian Ray Markham, who had traveled to his home country, and Dennis Madden who was seriously ill. The game, slated for 10 May 1936, was replaced by a contest between the winner of the Coupe de France and the winner of the French championship (XIII Catalan), which was played on the same date in Perpignan and won by the former by a score of 16–15.
