= 1942–43 Yorkshire Cup =

- Structure: Regional knockout championship
- Teams: 14
- Winners: Dewsbury
- Runners-up: Huddersfield

The 1942–43 Yorkshire Cup was the thirty-fifth occasion on which the Yorkshire Cup competition was held.

It was a knock-out competition between (mainly professional) rugby league clubs from the county of Yorkshire. The actual area was at times increased to encompass other teams from outside the county such as Newcastle, Mansfield, Coventry, and even London (in the form of Acton & Willesden. The competition always took place early in the season, in the autumn, with the final taking place in (or just before) December. The only exception to this was when disruption of the fixture list was caused during, and immediately after, the two world wars.

The Second World War was continuing and the Yorkshire Cup was played in the early part of the 1942–43 Northern Rugby Football League Wartime Emergency League season.

Dewsbury won the trophy by beating Huddersfield over two legs by an aggregate score of 7–2.

Dewsbury played the first leg match at home (at Crown Flatt) and won 7–0. The attendance was 11,000 and receipts were £680.

Huddersfield were at home (at Fartown) for the second leg match and duly won 2–0. The attendance at the second leg match was 6,252 and receipts £618.

== Change in club participation ==
Hull Kingston Rovers dropped out of the wartime Lancashire league after the first (1939–40) season. They did not return to league competition until 1945–46 peacetime season.

Bramley withdrew after the third wartime season (1941–42) had finished and did not rejoin until the 1945–46 season.

Castleford withdrew after the third wartime season (1941–42) had finished and did not participate for two seasons, re-joining for the 1944–45 season.

Hunslet withdrew after the third wartime season (1941–42) had finished and did not participate for this season, re-joining for the next 1943–44 season.

Wigan entered the Yorkshire Cup competition for the third successive season

Oldham also entered the Yorkshire Cup competition and for the third successive season

St. Helens also entered the Yorkshire Cup competition and for their first season.

Dewsbury had a relatively successful time during the war years. Managed by Eddie Waring, and with the side boosted by the inclusion of a number of big-name guest players, the club won the Wartime Emergency League in 1941–42 and again the following season 1942–43 (though that championship was declared null and void when it was discovered they had used an ineligible player). They were also runners-up in the Championship in 1943–44, Challenge Cup winners in 1943 and Yorkshire Cup final appearances in this season 1940–41 and winners in 1942–43.

== Background ==
This season there were no junior/amateur clubs taking part. Bramley, Castleford and Hunslet withdrew, and St. Helens joined. With the continued presence of the two Lancashire clubs, Wigan and Oldham, this resulted in the number of entrants decreasing by two, to a total of fourteen.

This in turn resulted in two byes in the first round.

For the second successive year, all the ties (this season including the actual final) were played on a two-legged home and away basis.

== Competition and results ==
=== Round 1 – first leg ===
Round 1's first leg involved six matches (with two byes) and 14 clubs.

All first round ties were played on a two-legged home and away basis.

Game no.	Fixture date	Home team	Score	Away team	Venue	Agg	Att	Rec	Notes	Ref
1	Sat 17 Oct 1942	Batley	6–2	Wakefield Trinity	Mount Pleasant					
2	Sat 17 Oct 1942	Featherstone Rovers	0–0	Hull	Post Office Road					
3	Sat 17 Oct 1942	Halifax	3–0	Oldham	Thrum Hall					
4	Sat 17 Oct 1942	Keighley	0–21	Huddersfield	Lawkholme Lane					
5	Sat 17 Oct 1942	Leeds	15–7	Dewsbury	Headingley					
6	Sat 17 Oct 1942	York	5–4	Bradford Northern	Clarence Street					
7		Wigan		bye						
8		St. Helens		bye						

=== Round 1 – second leg ===
Round 1's second leg involved six matches (with two byes) and 14 clubs.

All first round ties were played on a two-legged home and away basis.

Game no.	Fixture date	Home team	Score	Away team	Venue	Agg	Att	Rec	Notes	Ref
1	Sat 24 Oct 1942	Wakefield Trinity	7–13	Batley	Belle Vue	9–19				
2	Sat 24 Oct 1942	Hull	8–0	Featherstone Rovers	Boulevard	8–0				
3	Sat 24 Oct 1942	Oldham	3–9	Halifax	Watersheddings	3–12				
4	Sat 24 Oct 1942	Huddersfield	33–5	Keighley	Fartown	54–5				
5	Sat 24 Oct 1942	Dewsbury	18–5	Leeds	Crown Flatt	25–20				
6	Sat 24 Oct 1942	Bradford Northern	5–2	York	Odsal	9–7				
7		Wigan		bye						
8		St. Helens		bye						

=== Round 2 – quarterfinals – first leg ===
Round 2's quarterfinals' first leg involved four matches and eight clubs.

All second round ties were played on a two-legged home and away basis.

Game no.	Fixture date	Home team	Score	Away team	Venue	Agg	Att	Rec	Notes	Ref
1	Sat 24 Oct 1942	St. Helens	21–8	Wigan	Knowsley Road				(Note: This was the first Yorkshire Cup match to be played by St. Helens and also the first to be played at Knowsley Road.)	
2	Sat 31 Oct 1942	Batley	5–10	Huddersfield	Mount Pleasant					
3	Sat 31 Oct 1942	Halifax	7–10	Bradford Northern	Thrum Hall					
4	Sat 31 Oct 1942	Hull	12–10	Dewsbury	Boulevard					

=== Round 2 – second leg ===
Round 2's second leg involved four matches and eight clubs.

All second round ties were played on a two-legged home and away basis.

Game no.	Fixture date	Home team	Score	Away team	Venue	Agg	Att	Rec	Notes	Ref
1	Sat 07 Nov 1942	Wigan	32–11	St. Helens	Central Park	40–32			(Note: After extra time - 80 mins score was 19–6 (27-27 agg). Wigan won on aggregate 40–32.)	
2	Sat 07 Nov 1942	Huddersfield	36–3	Batley	Fartown	39–16				
3	Sat 07 Nov 1942	Bradford Northern	6–5	Halifax	Odsal	16–12				
4	Sat 07 Nov 1942	Dewsbury	23–7	Hull	Crown Flatt	33–19				

=== Round 3 – semifinals – first leg ===
Round 3's semifinals' first leg involved two matches and four clubs.

Both semifinal ties were played on a two-legged home and away basis.

Game no.	Fixture date	Home team	Score	Away team	Venue	Agg	Att	Rec	Notes	Ref
1	Sat 14 Nov 1942	Dewsbury	11–3	Wigan	Crown Flatt					
2	Sat 14 Nov 1942	Huddersfield	6–0	Bradford Northern	Fartown					

=== Semifinal – second leg ===
The semifinal's second leg involved two matches and four clubs.

Both semifinal ties were played on a two-legged home and away basis.

Game no.	Fixture date	Home team	Score	Away team	Venue	Agg	Att	Rec	Notes	Ref
1	Sat 21 Nov 1942	Wigan	0–6	Dewsbury	Central Park	3–17				
2	Sat 21 Nov 1942	Bradford Northern	4–11	Huddersfield	Odsal	4–17				

=== Final – first leg ===
The final was played on a two-legged home and away basis this season.

Game no.	Fixture date	Home team	Score	Away team	Venue	Agg	Att	Rec	Notes	Ref
	Saturday 28 November 1942	Dewsbury	7–0	Huddersfield	Crown Flatt		11000	680		

Dewsbury	No.	Huddersfield
	Teams	
George Bunter (Note: Guest player from Broughton Rangers)	1	Billy Belshaw (Note: Guest player from Warrington)
Roy Francis (Note: Guest player from Barrow)	2	Ossie Peake
Cyril Morrell (Note: Guest player from Hunslet)	3	Alex Fiddes
Jimmy Robinson (Note: Guest player from Castleford)	4	Russ Pepperell
Alan Edwards (Note: Guest player from Salford)	5	Randall Lewis (Note: Guest player from Swinton)
Tom Kenny	6	Tommy Bartram
Harry Royal	7	John McGurk
Harry Hammond	8	Pat McManus
George Curran	9	Dave Cotton
Jackie Gardner	10	Tommy Taylor
George Kershaw	11	Frank Wagstaff
Frank Smith Sr.	12	Douglas Booth
Charlie Seeling Jr.	13	Alex Givvons
Eddie Waring	Coach	??
7	Score	0
	HT	
	Scorers	
	Tries	
	T	
	T	
	T	
	T	
	T	
	T	
	T	
	Goals	
	G	
	G	
	G	
	Drop goals	
	DG	
	DG	
	DG	
Referee		unknown

=== Final – second leg ===
The final was played on a two-legged home and away basis this season.

Game no.	Fixture date	Home team	Score	Away team	Venue	Agg	Att	Rec	Notes	Ref
	Saturday 5 December 1942	Huddersfield	2–0	Dewsbury	Fartown Ground					

Dewsbury	No.	Huddersfield
	Teams	
George Bunter	1	Billy Belshaw
Barney Hudson	2	Ossie Peake
Alan Edwards	3	Alex Fiddes
Jimmy Robinson	4	Bill Davies
Roy Francis	5	Randall Lewis
Tom Kenny	6	Stan Pepperell
Harry Royal	7	John McGurk
Harry Hammond	8	Douglas Booth
George Curran	9	Dave Cotton
Jackie Gardner	10	Tommy Taylor
George Kershaw	11	William Chapman
Frank Smith Sr.	12	Frank Wagstaff
Charlie Seeling Jr.	13	Alex Givvons
Eddie Waring	Coach	??
0	Score	2
	HT	
	Scorers	
	Goals	
	G	Bill Davies (1)
Referee		unknown ()

Scoring - Try = three (3) points - Goal = two (2) points - Drop goal = two (2) points

=== The road to success ===
All the ties (including the final itself) were played on a two-leg (home and away) basis.

The first club named in each of the ties played the first leg at home.

The scores shown are the aggregate score over the two legs.

First round
Featherstone Rovers	0
Hull	8
Leeds	5
Dewsbury	18
St. Helens
bye
Wigan
bye
Batley	13
Wakefield Trinity	7
Keighley	5
Huddersfield	33
Halifax	12
Oldham	3
York	7
Bradford Northern	9

Second round
Hull	19
Dewsbury	33
St. Helens	32
Wigan	40
Batley	13
Huddersfield	39
Halifax	12
Bradford Northern	16

Semifinals
Dewsbury	17
Wigan	3
Huddersfield	17
Bradford Northern	4

Final
Dewsbury	7
Huddersfield	2

== See also ==
- 1942–43 Northern Rugby Football League Wartime Emergency League season
- Rugby league county cups
