= 1934–35 Challenge Cup =

Rugby league competition

- Duration: 5 rounds
- Winners: Castleford
- Runners-up: Huddersfield

The 1934–35 Challenge Cup was the 35th staging of rugby league's oldest knockout competition, the Challenge Cup.

== First round ==
Date	Team one	Score one	Team two	Score two
09 Feb	Astley & Tyldesley	4	Castleford	33
09 Feb	Barrow Marsh	18	Rochdale Hornets	28
09 Feb	Barrow	28	Sharlston Rovers	3
09 Feb	Featherstone Rovers	2	Broughton Rangers	8
09 Feb	Hunslet	11	Hull Kingston Rovers	0
09 Feb	Keighley	24	Bramley	4
09 Feb	Leeds	3	Huddersfield	4
09 Feb	Leigh	0	Wigan	44
09 Feb	Manchester SC	9	Dewsbury	28
09 Feb	Oldham	3	St Helens	0
09 Feb	Salford	16	Halifax	11
09 Feb	Swinton	2	Liverpool	10
09 Feb	Wakefield Trinity	23	St Helens Recs	8
09 Feb	Warrington	11	Hull FC	11
09 Feb	Widnes	34	Batley	0
09 Feb	York	12	Bradford Northern	12
13 Feb	Bradford Northern	0	York	2
14 Feb	Hull FC	16	Warrington	2

== Second round ==
Date	Team one	Score one	Team two	Score two
23 Feb	Barrow	17	York	5
23 Feb	Huddersfield	6	Oldham	0
23 Feb	Hull FC	21	Broughton Rangers	0
23 Feb	Hunslet	22	Salford	2
23 Feb	Liverpool	2	Castleford	8
23 Feb	Wakefield Trinity	18	Keighley	6
23 Feb	Widnes	13	Rochdale Hornets	4
23 Feb	Wigan	25	Dewsbury	5

== Quarterfinals ==
Date	Team one	Score one	Team two	Score two
09 Mar	Barrow	13	Wigan	4
09 Mar	Castleford	10	Hunslet	3
09 Mar	Huddersfield	4	Widnes	0
09 Mar	Wakefield Trinity	0	Hull FC	7

== Semifinals ==
Date	Team one	Score one	Team two	Score two
30 Mar	Castleford	11	Barrow	5
30 Mar	Huddersfield	21	Hull	5

== Final ==
Castleford beat Huddersfield 11–8 in the final at Wembley before a crowd of 39,000. This was Castleford’s first Challenge Cup final win in their first final appearance, and Huddersfield’s first defeat in six final appearances.

4 May 1935

Castleford	11 - 8	Huddersfield
Tries: Askin, Adams, Cunliffe; Goals: Atkinson	Report	Tries: Towill, Fiddes; Goals Sherwood

Wembley, London
Attendance: 39,000 (HT 5-3)
Referee: A E Harding

1	George Lewis
2	Bernard Cunniffe
3	Arthur Atkinson (c)
4	James "Jim" A. Croston
5	Tom Askin
6	William H. Davies
7	Leslie "Les" Adams
8	Patrick B. McManus
9	Harold Haley
10	Thomas "Tommy" L. Taylor
11	James Crossley
12	Frank Smith
13	Edward Sadler
Coach:
William "Billy" Rhodes

1	Tommy Scourfield
2	Stanley "Stan" J. Mountain
3	Idriss A. Towill
4	Alexander Erskine Fiddes (c)
5	Ray T. Markham
6	Gwyn Richards
7	David Morgan "Dai" Davies
8	Reginald S. Roberts
9	William "Billy" Watson
10	Herbert Sherwood
11	Henry Tiffany
12	John Fuller
13	Frederick Talbot
Coach:
Chris Brockbank

== Cup Winners' Match ==
By agreement between the RFL and the French Rugby League, Castleford advanced to an international unification game against inaugural French Cup winners US Lyon-Villeurbanne, which was played near Paris and won by the English side on a score of 24–21.
