= Seeling =

Seeling is a surname. Notable people with the surname include:

- Charlie Seeling (1883–1956), New Zealand rugby league and union player
- Charlie Seeling Jr., New Zealand rugby league player and coach
- Charles R. Seeling (1895–1951), American cinematographer, film producer and director
- Heinrich Seeling (1852–1932), German architect
