= James Crossley =

James Crossley may refer to:

- James Crossley (author) (1800–1883), English author and bibliophile
- James Crossley (bodybuilder) (born 1973), English actor and bodybuilder
- James Crossley (rugby league) (fl. 1930s–1940s), English rugby player

== See also ==
- Crossley (name)
