= Towill =

Towill is a surname. Notable people with the name include:

- Idris Towill (1909–1988), Welsh rugby footballer
- John Towill (born 20th century), British ice skating coach and choreographer
- John Towill Rutt (1760–1841), English political activist and social reformer
