= Frederick Talbot =

Wales international rugby league footballer

Personal information
- Born: 18 September 1908 Ebbw Vale, Wales

Playing information
- Position: Second-row, Loose forward
Club
Years	Team	Pld	T	G	FG	P
≤1933–≥35	Huddersfield
≤1937–≥37	Keighley
	Total	0	0	0	0	0
Representative
Years	Team	Pld	T	G	FG	P
1935	Wales	2

Frederick Talbot (born 18 September 1908; death date unknown) was a Welsh professional rugby league footballer who played in the 1930s. He played at representative level for Wales, and at club level for Huddersfield and Keighley, as a second-row or loose forward.

== Playing career ==
=== 1933 ===
Talbot played at second-row in Huddersfield's 21–17 victory over Warrington in the 1932–33 Challenge Cup final at Wembley Stadium, London on Saturday 6 May 1933.

=== 1935 ===
Talbot was a "reserve to travel" for Wales while at Huddersfield in the 11-18 defeat by France during the 1935 European Rugby League Championship at Stade du Parc Lescure, Bordeaux on Tuesday 1 January 1935, and won a cap in the 11-24 defeat by England at Anfield, Liverpool on Wednesday 10 April 1935.

He played at loose forward in the 8–11 defeat by Castleford in the 1934–35 Challenge Cup final at Wembley on Saturday 4 May 1935, in front of a crowd of 39,000.

=== 1937 ===
He and played right second row in Keighley's 5-18 defeat by Widnes in the 1936–37 Challenge Cup final at Wembley on Saturday 8 May 1937, in front of a crowd of 47,699.
