= Tom Banks (rugby league) =

English rugby league footballer

Personal information
- Full name: Thomas Banks
- Born: 8 May 1907; Castleford, England
- Died: 16 April 1959 (aged 51); Pontefract, England

Playing information
- Position: Second-row
Club
Years	Team	Pld	T	G	FG	P
1929–34	Huddersfield
1934–36	York
1936–42	Castleford	41	2	0	0	6
1938	St Helens	8	0	0	0	0
	Total	49	2	0	0	6
Representative
Years	Team	Pld	T	G	FG	P
1931	England	1	1	0	0	3
1932	Yorkshire	1	0	0	0	0

Thomas Banks (1907 – 1959) was a professional rugby league footballer who played in the 1930s and 1940s. He played at representative level for England, and at club level for Huddersfield, York, Castleford and St Helens.

== Playing career ==
=== Club career ===
Born in Castleford, Banks joined rugby league club Huddersfield in August 1928. He played at prop in Huddersfield's 21–17 victory over Warrington in the 1932–33 Challenge Cup Final at Wembley Stadium, London on Saturday 6 May 1933. He was transferred to York in September 1934.

Banks joined his hometown club Castleford from York in January 1936. He played in Castleford's victory in the Yorkshire League during the 1938–39 season.

=== International honours ===
Thomas Banks won a cap for England while at Huddersfield in 1931 against Wales.
