= Burchmore =

Burchmore is a surname. Notable people with the surname include:

- Eric Burchmore (1920–1994), British Royal Air Force officer
- Rhonda Burchmore (born 1960), Australian entertainer
