= 1932–33 Challenge Cup =

Rugby league competition

- Duration: 5 rounds
- Winners: Huddersfield
- Runners-up: Warrington

The 1932–33 Challenge Cup was the 33rd staging of rugby league's oldest knockout competition, the Challenge Cup.

== First round ==
Date	Team one	Score one	Team two	Score two
11 Feb	Askern	0	Wigan	46
11 Feb	Barrow	19	Bramley	0
11 Feb	Batley	9	Featherstone Rovers	6
11 Feb	Bradford Northern	3	St Helens	24
11 Feb	Broughton Rangers	5	Wakefield Trinity	6
11 Feb	Halifax	42	Uno's Dabs	5
11 Feb	Huddersfield	19	Dewsbury	7
11 Feb	Hull FC	37	Higginshaw	9
11 Feb	Hull Kingston Rovers	4	Keighley	4
11 Feb	Leeds	36	Wigan Highfield	0
11 Feb	Oldham	13	Rochdale Hornets	8
11 Feb	St Helens Recs	5	Hunslet	19
11 Feb	Salford	11	Castleford	0
11 Feb	Swinton	5	Widnes	2
11 Feb	Warrington	34	Leigh	3
11 Feb	York	35	Barrow Marsh	6
14 Feb	Keighley	23	Hull Kingston Rovers	7

== Second round ==
Date	Team One	Score One	Team Two	Score Two
25 Feb	Barrow	0	Huddersfield	0
01 Mar	Salford	3	Leeds	4
01 Mar	Wigan	5	Oldham	3
01 Mar	York	0	Swinton	3
02 Mar	Halifax	10	Keighley	0
02 Mar	St Helens	14	Hunslet	3
06 Mar	Huddersfield	2	Barrow	0
07 Mar	Batley	10	Warrington	20
08 Mar	Hull FC	9	Wakefield Trinity	4

== Quarter finals ==
Date	Team One	Score One	Team Two	Score Two
11 Mar	Leeds	12	Hull FC	0
11 Mar	St Helens	18	Halifax	6
11 Mar	Swinton	5	Huddersfield	12
11 Mar	Wigan	7	Warrington	9

== Semi-finals ==
Date	Team One	Score One	Team Two	Score Two
25 Mar	Warrington	11	St Helens	5
25 Mar	Huddersfield	30	Leeds	8

== Final ==
Huddersfield beat Warrington 21–17 in the final at Wembley before a crowd of 41,784. This was Huddersfield's fourth Challenge Cup Final win in as many appearances, and they became the first team to win the trophy more than three times. This was also the fifth Challenge Cup Final defeat for Warrington.

6 May 1933

Huddersfield	21–17	Warrington
Tries: Brindle, Mills, Adams; Goals: Bowkett (6)	Report	Tries: Dingsdale, Davies (2); Goals Holding (4)

Wembley, London
Attendance: 41,784
Referee: F Fairhurst (Wigan)

1	Tommy Scourfield
2	Ernie Mills
3	Stan Brogden
4	Len Bowkett (c)
5	Ray Markham
6	Gwyn Richards
7	Les Adams
8	Herbert Sherwood
9	Cyril Halliday
10	Thomas Banks
11	Henry Tiffany
12	Frederick Talbot
13	Frederick Brindle
Coach:
Chris Brockbank

1	Billy Holding
2	Tom Blinkhorn
3	Bill Shankland (c)
4	Billy Dingsdale
5	Tommy Thompson
6	Jack Oster
7	David Davies
8	Jack Miller
9	Nat Bentham
10	Sammy Hardman
11	Candy Evans
12	Bob Smith
13	Charlie Seeling Jr.
