= Frank Smith Jr. =

English rugby league footballer

Frank Smith
Personal information
- Born: unknown

Playing information
- Position: Wing, Centre
Club
Years	Team	Pld	T	G	FG	P
1957–61	Featherstone Rovers	101	52	0	0	156
1962–65	Castleford	45	25	0	0	75
	Total	146	77	0	0	231
Representative
Years	Team	Pld	T	G	FG	P
1963	Yorkshire	1	0	0	0	0
- Father: Frank Smith Sr.

Frank Smith (year of birth unknown), also known by the nickname of "Cheyenne" (after his facial similarity to the character Cheyenne Bodie in the TV series Cheyenne played by Clint Walker), is a former professional rugby league footballer who played in the 1950s and 1960s. He played at representative level for Yorkshire, and at club level for Featherstone Rovers and Castleford, as a wing or centre.

== Playing career ==
=== International honours ===
Frank Smith played on the wing in Rest of the League's 16–21 defeat by Great Britain in pre-1960 Rugby League World Cup warm-up match, in aid of the George VI's Jubilee Trust, at Knowsley Road, St. Helens on Monday 12 September 1960.

=== County honours ===
Frank Smith won a cap for Yorkshire while at Castleford playing at centre in the 13-15 defeat by Cumberland at Belle Vue, Wakefield on 25 September 1963.

=== County League appearances ===
Frank Smith played in Castleford's victory in the Yorkshire League during the 1964–65 season.

=== County Cup Final appearances ===
Frank Smith played on the wing in Featherstone Rovers' 15-14 victory over Hull F.C. in the 1959–60 Yorkshire Cup Final during the 1959–60 season at Headingley, Leeds on Saturday 31 October 1959, in front of a crowd of 23,983.

=== Club career ===
Frank Smith made his début for Featherstone Rovers on Saturday 26 January 1957, and he played his last match for Featherstone Rovers during the 1960–61 season.

== Genealogical information ==
Frank Smith is the son of the rugby league footballer; Frank Smith Sr.
