= Crossley (name) =

- Pronunciation: English: /ˈkrɒslɪ/
- Language: English

Origin
- Language: English
- Meaning: "cross" + "leah" (woodland clearing)

Crossley is a surname of Old English origin deriving from two locations called Crossley in West Yorkshire.

Crossley may refer to:

- Aaron Crossley, American politician
- Ada Crossley (1874–1929), Australian singer
- Alfred Crossley (1839–1877), English natural history collector in Madagascar
- Andrew Crossley, British solicitor, partner in closed law firm ACS:Law
- Anthony Crossley (1903–1939), British writer and Conservative Party politician
- Bob Crossley (1912–2010), English abstract artist
- Bryn Crossley (1958–2018), Welsh jockey
- Callie Crossley, American journalist, host of "The Callie Crossley Show"
- Christie Raleigh Crossley (born 1987), American Paralympic swimmer
- Edward Crossley (1841–1905), English businessman and Liberal Party politician
- Francis Crossley (1817–1872), British carpet manufacturer and philanthropist
- Frank Crossley (actor) (1874–1943), Australian comic actor
- Geoffrey Crossley (1921–2002), British racing driver
- Geoffrey Allan Crossley (1920–2009), British diplomat
- Herbert Crossley (1901–1921), English heavyweight boxer
- Hugh Crossley (born 1971), British hotel owner and aristocrat
- James Crossley (bodybuilder) (born 1973), English bodybuilder and actor
- James Crossley (author) (1800–1883), English author, bibliophile and literary scholar
- James Crossley (rugby league), English rugby league footballer who played the 1930s and 1940s
- Jeanette Crossley (1949–2015), New Zealand biochemist
- John Crossley (1812–1879), British politician
- John Crossley Jr. (born 1956), English rugby league footballer who played in the 1970s and 1980s
- Kelsey-Beth Crossley (born 1992), English actress
- Kevin Crossley-Holland (born 1941), English children's author
- Lloyd Crossley (1860–1926), Anglican Bishop of Auckland, New Zealand
- Mark Crossley (born 1969), English born Wales goalkeeper
- Mark Crossley (broadcaster) (born 1987), English Radio DJ
- Mark Crossley (musician), Canadian musician
- Matt Crossley (born 1968), English footballer
- Michael Crossley (1912–1987), Royal Air Force flying ace
- Pamela Kyle Crossley (born 1955), American historian
- Paul Crossley (pianist) (born 1944), British pianist
- Paul Crossley (footballer) (1948–1996), English professional footballer
- Richard Crossley (born 1969), Maltese, English professional fashion photographer
- Richard Crossley (born 1970), English professional footballer
- Rosemary Crossley (1945–2023), Australian author
- Roy Crossley (1923–2003), English footballer
- Russell Crossley (1927–2018), English footballer
- Shanna Crossley (born 1983), American professional basketball player
- Steve Crossley (born 1990), English rugby league footballer who played in the 2010s
- Syd Crossley (1885–1960), English film actor
- Thomas Crossley, English 19th-century professional footballer
- Wallace Crossley (1874–1943), publisher and 29th Lieutenant Governor of Missouri

== See also ==
- Savile Crossley, 1st Baron Somerleyton (1857–1935), British Liberal Unionist politician
- Sir William Crossley, 1st Baronet (1844–1911), British engineer and Liberal politician
