= Kenneth Pye =

English rugby league footballer (born 1933)

Personal information
- Born: first 1/4 1933 Pontefract district. England

Playing information
- Position: Scrum-half, Prop
Club
| Years | Team | Pld | T | G | FG | P |
|---|---|---|---|---|---|---|
| 1950–63 | Castleford | 344 | 70 | 0 | 0 | 210 |
| 1964–≥64 | Keighley |
| | Total | 344 | 70 | 0 | 0 | 210 |

Kenneth Pye (birth registered first 1/4 1933) is an English former professional rugby league footballer who played in the 1950s and 1960s. He played at club level for Castleford, and Keighley, as a scrum-half or prop.

== Background ==
Kenneth Pye's birth was registered in Pontefract district, West Riding of Yorkshire, England, he worked at Glasshoughton coking plant.

== Playing career ==
=== Notable tour matches ===
Ken Pye played scrum-half in the combined Castleford and Featherstone Rovers teams' match against New Zealand at Wheldon Road, Castleford.

== Personal life ==
Kenneth Pye is the younger brother of the rugby league footballer for Castleford; Joshua J. "Jos" Pye (birth registered third 1/4 1930 (age 95–96)).
