= Stan Woodbridge =

Royal Air Force airman

Stanley James Woodbridge
- Born: 29 August 1921; Chelsea, London, England
- Died: 7 February 1945 (aged 23); British Burma
- Burial place: Rangoon War Cemetery
- Military career
- Allegiance: United Kingdom
- Branch: Royal Air Force Volunteer Reserve
- Rank: Flight Sergeant
- Service number: 1393806
- Unit: No. 159 Squadron RAF
- Conflicts: Second World War: Pacific War; Burma campaign; Burma campaign 1945 (executed)
- Awards: George Cross

Flight Sergeant Stanley James Woodbridge, GC (29 August 1921 – 7 February 1945), known as Stan Woodbridge, was a British Second World War recipient of the George Cross. He was born in Chelsea, London, and during the Second World War served as a member of the Royal Air Force Volunteer Reserve, with No. 159 Squadron RAF.

== Second World War ==
Woodbridge was captured by Japanese forces along with five other members of his crew, when their Consolidated Liberator aircraft crashed in Burma. The three other members of the crew, including former England international rugby player Les Adams, were killed. Woodbridge, who was the crew's wireless operator, was subjected to torture, and was eventually beheaded along with the three other non-commissioned officers from his crew. The two commissioned officers from the crew were taken to Rangoon Jail and found alive when Rangoon was liberated. Throughout his ordeal, Woodbridge refused to give information to his Japanese captors about his codes or radio equipment.

In 1948, Woodbridge was posthumously awarded the George Cross in recognition of his courage and devotion to duty.

Woodbridge is buried at the Rangoon War Cemetery.
