= No. 159 Squadron RAF =

Defunct flying squadron of the Royal Air Force

- No. 159 Squadron badge
- Active: 1 June 1918 - 4 July 1918; 2 July 1942 – 1 June 1946
- Country: United Kingdom
- Branch: Royal Air Force
- Role: Bombing, mining, reconnaissance, transport
- Mottos: Latin: Quo non, quando non (Translated: "Whither not, When not?")
- Engagements: Far East 1942-45

Commanders
- Notable commanders: James Blackburn

Insignia
- Squadron Badge heraldry: In Front of logs inflamed, a peacocks head erased, in the beak a woodmans axe.

Aircraft flown
- Bomber: Consolidated Liberator
- Patrol: Consolidated Liberator
- Reconnaissance: Consolidated Liberator
- Transport: Consolidated Liberator

No. 159 Squadron RAF was a Royal Air Force squadron that was active as a bomber, mine-laying, reconnaissance and transport unit in the Second World War.

== History ==
=== Formation in World War I ===
The original 159 Squadron was to be formed during the First World War, but the idea was disbanded so that reinforcements could be sent to France.

=== Reformation in the Second World War ===
No. 159 Squadron was reformed at RAF Molesworth on 2 July 1942 during the Second World War and its ground crew personnel were posted, without aircraft, to the Middle East on 12 February 1942 and then to India on 18 May 1942. Flying Consolidated Liberators, the squadron was posted to Palestine in July 1942 and carried out bombing raids in North Africa, Italy and Greece. No. 159 then flew to India on 30 September 1942. The first operation against the Japanese was on 17 November 1942, and during the rest of the war, the squadron flew mine-laying, bombing, and reconnaissance missions over Burma, Siam, Malaya, Indo-China and the Dutch East Indies.

In October 1944, the Squadron mounted an audacious minelaying raid on the Japanese held port of Penang. The mission entailed a round trip of over 3,000 miles, which at the time was the longest distance bombing raid in history. Eric Burchmore was in charge of the modification and preparation of the Consolidated Liberator aircraft used for the mission. The raid was led by Wing Commander James Blackburn and was a complete success, with the port of Penang completely blocked by mines and all of the aircraft and crews returning safely. Burchmore was awarded a military MBE in recognition of his contribution to the operation, whilst Wing Commander Blackburn was awarded a Bar to his DSO and was also awarded the American DFC by the United States.

After the war, No.159 converted to transport and survey duties before disbanding on 1 June 1946.

== Notable squadron members ==
=== Stanley James Woodbridge, GC ===
Flight Sergeant Stanley James Woodbridge, a wireless operator who served with 159 squadron, was awarded the George Cross posthumously in 1948. Woodbridge had steadfastly refused to divulge his codes and other details of his radio equipment to his Japanese captors. Woodbridge was tortured and eventually beheaded along with three other members of his crew

=== James Blackburn DSO & Bar, DFC & Bar, DFC (US) ===
Wing Commander James Blackburn DSO & Bar, DFC & Bar, DFC (US)[1] (1916–1993) was a Royal Air Force officer who completed a record five tours of operations during World War II.

=== See also ===
- Eric Burchmore

== Aircraft operated ==
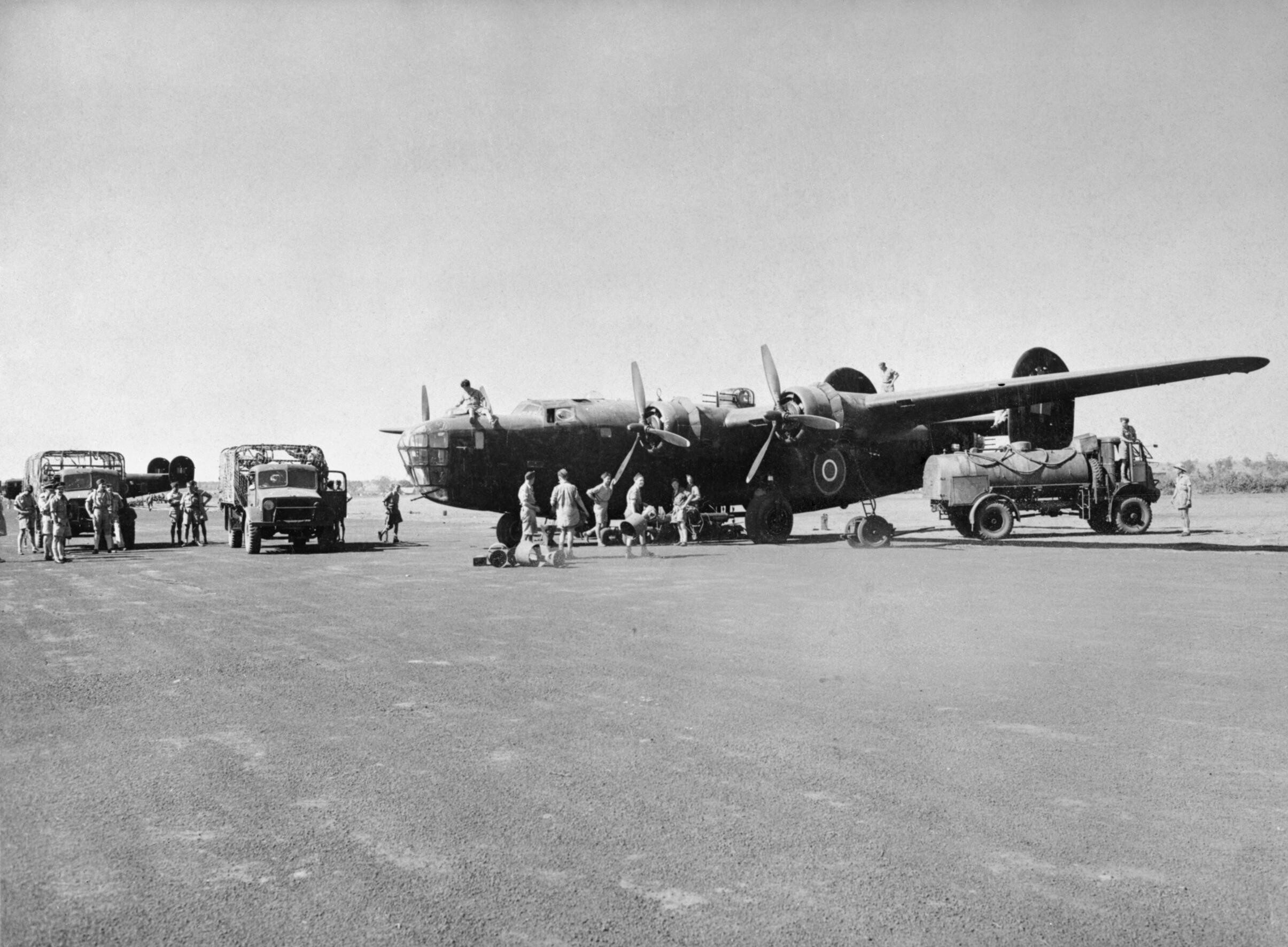
159 Squadron Consolidated Liberator Mk. II being refueled at Salbani, India

Aircraft operated by no. 159 Squadron RAF, data from
From	To	Aircraft	Variant
July 1942	August 1943	Consolidated Liberator	Mk.II
August 1943	February 1945	Consolidated Liberator	Mks.III, V
March 1944	July 1945	Consolidated Liberator	Mk.VI
June 1945	May 1946	Consolidated Liberator	Mk.VIII

== Squadron bases ==
Bases and airfields used by no. 159 Squadron RAF, data from
From	To	Base	Remark
2 January 1942	12 February 1942	RAF Molesworth, Cambridgeshire	Air echelon training at RAF Polebrook (1653 HCU)
12 February 1942	15 April 1942	En route to Middle East	(Ground echelon)
15 April 1942	10 May 1942	RAF Fayid, Egypt	(Ground Echelon, Air echelon 26 April to RAF Lyneham)
10 May 1942	24 May 1942	En route to India	(Ground echelon, one element remained at Fayid)
24 May 1942	1 June 1942	RAF Deolali, Maharashtra, British India	
1 June 1942	27 September 1942	RAF Chakrata, Uttarakhand, British India	(Ground echelon, Air echelon 7 June to RAF Fayid, Egypt; 2 July to RAF St Jean, Palestine and 12 August to RAF Aqir, Palestine)
27 September 1942	24 October 1943	RAF Salbani, West Bengal, British India	Ground and Air echelons joined
24 October 1943	9 March 1944	RAF Digri, Bengal, British India	Det. at RAF Dhubalia, Bengal
9 March 1944	15 April 1944	RAF Dhubalia, Bengal, British India	Det. at Madhaiganj, United Provinces
15 April 1944	2 October 1945	RAF Digri, Bengal, British India	Dets. at Jessore, Akyab, Chian Bay, Drigh Road and Pegu
2 October 1945	1 June 1946	RAF Salbani, West Bengal, British India	Dets. at Pegu, RAF Santa Cruz and Sookerating

== Commanding officers ==
Officers commanding no. 159 squadron RAF, data from
June 1944	December 1944	W/Cdr. James Blackburn DSO & Bar, DFC & Bar
December 1944	April 1945	W/Cdr. Byron Francis Burbridge
April 1945	?	W/Cdr. Lucian Brett Ercolani, DSO & Bar, DFC
