= Billy Rhodes (English rugby league) =

English RL coach and former England international rugby league footballer

William Rhodes
- Godfrey Phillips Cigarette card featuring William Rhodes

Personal information
- Full name: William Rhodes
- Born: unknown England
- Died: unknown

Playing information
- Position: Wing, Prop
Club
Years	Team	Pld	T	G	FG	P
1906–08	Leeds
1908–23	Dewsbury
	Total	0	0	0	0	0
Representative
Years	Team	Pld	T	G	FG	P
1921	England	2	1	13	0	29

Coaching information
Club
Years	Team	Gms	W	D	L	W%
1926–58	Castleford	826	400	35	391	48

William Rhodes (birth unknown – death unknown) was an English professional rugby league footballer who played in the 1910s and 1920s, and coached in the 1920s through to the 1950s. He played at representative level for England, and at club level for Dewsbury (two spells), as a wing, and later as a prop, and coached at club level for Castleford.

== Playing career ==
=== Club career ===
Rhodes started his career with Leeds, but was transferred to Dewsbury in September 1908.

Rhodes played on the wing and scored two tries in Dewsbury's 8-5 victory over Oldham in the 1911–12 Challenge Cup Final during the 1911-12 season at Headingley, Leeds on Saturday 27 April 1912 in front of a crowd of 16,000,

Rhodes playing career was initially thought to be over after breaking his leg in September 1921 in a match against Huddersfield, but he made a brief comeback two years later.

=== International honours ===
Billy Rhodes won caps for England while at Dewsbury in 1921 against Wales, and Other Nationalities.

== Coaching career ==
Rhodes was the coach of Castleford on four occasions; 1926–27 season to 1928, 1932 to 1951, 1952 to November 1953, and December 1957 to 1958, his first game in charge was on Saturday 28 August 1926, and his last game in charge was on Wednesday 23 April 1958.

Rhodes was the coach in Castleford's 11-8 victory over Huddersfield in the 1934–35 Challenge Cup Final during the 1934–35 season at Wembley Stadium, London on Saturday 4 May 1935, in front of a crowd of 39,000.
