= Albert Lunn =

English rugby league footballer

Playing information
- Position: Fullback
Club
Years	Team	Pld	T	G	FG	P
1951–63	Castleford	363	40	875	0	1870

Albert Lunn is a former professional rugby league footballer who played in the 1950s and 1960s. He played at club level for Castleford, as a goal-kicking fullback.

== Playing career ==
=== Career records ===
Albert Lunn holds Castleford's "most goals in a career" record with 875, and Castleford's "most points in a career" record with 1,870.

=== Club career ===
Albert Lunn made his début for Castleford in the 12-2 victory over the Belle Vue Rangers on Saturday 20 October 1951.
