= Les Adams (rugby league) =

GB & England international rugby league footballer

- Ogden's Cigarette card featuring Adams

Personal information
- Full name: Leslie Adams
- Born: 14 November 1909 Hyde Park, Leeds, England
- Died: 31 January 1945 (aged 35) near Rangoon, British Burma

Playing information
- Position: Scrum-half
Club
Years	Team	Pld	T	G	FG	P
1926–32	Leeds	109	18	1		56
1932–34	Huddersfield
1934–42	Castleford	196	39	0	0	117
1942(guest)	→ Leeds
	Total	305	57	1	0	173
Representative
Years	Team	Pld	T	G	FG	P
1931–37	Yorkshire	≥7	0	0	0	0
1931–39	England	3	0	0	0	0
1932	Great Britain	1	0	0	0	0

Leslie Adams (14 November 1909 – 31 January 1945), also known by the nickname of "Juicy", was an English professional rugby league footballer who played in the 1930s and 1940s. He played at representative level for Great Britain, England and Yorkshire, and at club level for Leeds (two spells, including the second as a World War II guest), Huddersfield and Castleford, as a scrum-half.

== Background ==
Les 'Juicy' Adams' birth was registered in Leeds district, West Riding of Yorkshire, England, and he died aged 35 in Burma.

== Playing career ==
=== Leeds ===
Adams made his début for Leeds against Featherstone Rovers at Headingley, Leeds on 26 March 1927. He played scrum-half in Leeds' 11–8 victory over Swinton in the 1931–32 Challenge Cup Final during the 1931–32 season at Central Park, Wigan on Saturday 7 May 1932.

=== Huddersfield ===
Adams played scrum-half in Huddersfield's 21–17 victory over Warrington in the 1932–33 Challenge Cup Final during the 1932–33 season at Wembley Stadium, London on Saturday 6 May 1933.

=== Castleford ===
Adams' transfer from Huddersfield to Castleford on 18 January 1934, for a reported fee of £500, came at his own request.

He played scrum-half, and scored a try in Castleford's 11–8 victory over Huddersfield in the 1934–35 Challenge Cup Final during the 1934–35 season at Wembley Stadium, London on Saturday 4 May 1935, in front of a crowd of 39,000, In doing so, he became the first player to win the Challenge Cup with three different clubs.

Adams played in Castleford's victories in the Yorkshire League during the 1932–33 season and 1938–39 season.

=== Representative honours ===
Adams won caps for England while at Leeds in 1931 against Wales, while at Castleford in 1936 against Wales, in 1939 against France, and won a cap for Great Britain while at Leeds on Saturday 18 June 1932 against Australia at Brisbane Cricket Ground (the Gabba).

He won caps playing Scrum-half for Yorkshire while at Castleford in the 0–10 defeat by Cumberland at Whitehaven's stadium on 29 September 1934, the 5–5 draw with Lancashire at Leeds' stadium on 9 January 35, the 16–5 victory over Lancashire at Widnes' stadium on 12 October 1935, the 16–10 victory over Cumberland at Workington Town's stadium on 10 October 1936, the 6–28 defeat by Lancashire at Castleford's stadium on 21 October 1936, and the 7–7 draw with Cumberland at Hunslet's stadium on 10 November 1937.

== Death ==
Adams became a landlord in Leeds, and subsequently volunteered for war duty with the Royal Air Force, becoming a rear gunner with the rank of flight sergeant. He was killed in action on 31 January 1945 while serving as an air gunner on an aerial reconnaissance operation during the Burma campaign. The Liberator B Mk V in which he was flying suffered fatal engine trouble caused by bullets from a Japanese night fighter at 3:10 am 40 miles (64 km) south-west of Rangoon, British Burma. Of the nine men on the plane, three of the occupants, including Adams, are believed to have been trapped in the back of the plane, causing them to be killed in the crash. The remaining six men were captured, the 2 officers were separated from the Flight Sergeants and sent to Rangoon Jail, where they survived. The Flight Sergeants, including Stan Woodbridge, later awarded the George Cross, were beheaded by the Japanese Military on 7 February 1945, and are buried in the Rangoon War Cemetery. After the war the Japanese military officers responsible for the execution were tried for war crimes, and were subsequently executed. Despite numerous searches of the area around the crash site, and discussions with villagers who found the plane, no trace of the body of Adams, or his colleagues, was found.

== Honoured at Castleford Tigers ==
Adams is a Tigers Hall of Fame inductee.
