= James Crossley (rugby league) =

English rugby league footballer

Personal information
- Full name: James Crossley
- Born: date unknown Normanton, Wakefield, England
- Died: unknown

Playing information
- Position: Second-row
Club
Years	Team	Pld	T	G	FG	P
1933–49	Castleford	261	23	6	2	85

James "Jim" Crossley was an English professional rugby league footballer who played in the 1930s and 1940s. He played at club level for Castleford, as a second-row.

== Background ==
James Crossley was born in Normanton, Wakefield, West Riding of Yorkshire, England.

== Playing career ==
=== County League appearances ===
James Crossley played in Castleford's victory in the Yorkshire League during the 1938–39 season.

=== Challenge Cup Final appearances ===
James Crossley played at second-row in Castleford's 11-8 victory over Huddersfield in the 1935 Challenge Cup Final during the 1934–35 season at Wembley Stadium, London on Saturday 4 May 1935, in front of a crowd of 39,000.

== Testimonial match ==
A joint benefit season/testimonial match at Castleford for; Jim Crossley, Harold Haley, Pat McManus, and Frank Smith took place during the 1947–48 season.

== Genealogical information ==
James Crossley was the great-nephew of the rugby league footballer who played in the 1900s for Loscoe White Rose (in Featherstone); W. Crossley.
