= Billy Clements =

English rugby league footballer and coach

Personal information
- Full name: Billy Clements
- Born: unknown Featherstone, Wakefield, England
- Died: unknown

Playing information
- Height: 5 ft 9 in (1.75 m)
- Weight: 15 st 0 lb (95 kg)
- Position: Utility Forward, Prop
Club
Years	Team	Pld	T	G	FG	P
1921–28	Featherstone Rovers	176	33	12	0	123
1928	Wakefield Trinity	14	2	1	0	8
	Total	190	35	13	0	131
Representative
Years	Team	Pld	T	G	FG	P
1922–26	Yorkshire	3

Coaching information
Club
Years	Team	Gms	W	D	L	W%
1930–32	Castleford	85	33	2	50	39

Billy Clements (birth unknown – death unknown) was an English professional rugby league footballer who played in the 1920s, and coached in the 1930s. He played at representative level for Yorkshire, and at club level for Featherstone Rovers, and Wakefield Trinity, as an occasional goal-kicking utility forward, or prop, and coached at club level for Castleford.

== Background ==
Billy Clements was born in Featherstone, Wakefield, West Riding of Yorkshire, England.

== Playing career ==
Billy Clements made his début for Featherstone Rovers as a Utility Forward on Saturday 27 August 1921, he made his début for Wakefield Trinity as a prop during January 1928.

=== County honours ===
Billy Clements won caps for Yorkshire while at Featherstone Rovers; during the 1922–23 season against Lancashire, during the 1923–24 season against Cumberland, and during the 1925–26 season against Lancashire.
