= Idris Towill =

Wales international rugby league & union footballer

Idris Arthur Towill
Personal information
- Full name: Idris Towill
- Born: 12 November 1909; Bridgend district, Wales
- Died: 21 September 1988 (aged 78) unknown

Playing information

Rugby union
Club
Years	Team	Pld	T	G	FG	P
1931–31	Bridgend RFC
Representative
Years	Team	Pld	T	G	FG	P
≤Jan 1931–≤Jan 31	Glamorgan

Rugby league
- Position: Centre, Stand-off
Club
Years	Team	Pld	T	G	FG	P
1931–36	Huddersfield	94	20	0	0	60
1936–46	Keighley	271	55	0	0	165
1941/42	→ Oldham (guest)	1	0	0	0	0
194?	→ Castleford (guest)	1	0	0	0	0
	Total	367	75	0	0	225
Representative
Years	Team	Pld	T	G	FG	P
1932	Wales	1	0	0	0	0

Idris Arthur Towill (12 November 1909 – 21 September 1988) was a Welsh rugby union and professional rugby league footballer who played in the 1930s and 1940s. He played representative level rugby union (RU) for Welsh Schoolboys and Glamorgan and at club level for Bridgend RFC, and representative level rugby league (RL) for Wales, and at club level for Huddersfield, Keighley, Castleford and Oldham (World War II guest during the 1941–42 season), as a centre or stand-off.

== Background ==
Idris Towill's birth was registered in Bridgend district, Wales, and he died aged 78.

== Early career ==
A schoolboy international for Wales at rugby union, Towill captained his local rugby union team Bridgend and made four appearances for Glamorgan County before switching codes to rugby league when he signed for Huddersfield in January 1931.

== Rugby league career ==
=== Huddersfield ===
Towill played 94 matches for Huddersfield, scoring 20 tries, between 1931 and 1936 including a Challenge Cup final appearance in the 1935 final at Wembley Stadium on 4 May 1935. Towill played at centre and scored Huddersfield's first try in the 8–11 defeat by Castleford. While at Huddersfield, Towill won a single cap for Wales in a 2–19 defeat by England at the Willows, Salford on 27 January 1932; originally selected to play at centre, Towill played the game at stand-off due to a pre-match injury to selected stand-off Ivor Davies.

=== Keighley ===
In November 1936 Towill signed for Keighley where he played 271 games, scoring 55 tries, until injury ended his career in 1946. A second Challenge Cup final appearance was made for Keighley in the 5–18 defeat by Widnes at Wembley in the 1937 final on 8 May 1937.

The end of his career was marked by a joint benefit match with fellow Keighley stalwart, Norman Foster, on 14 May 1946. Towill's select XIII beat Foster's select XIII 41–40.
