= Andrew Broatch =

Scottish rugby footballer

Personal information
- Full name: Andrew Broatch
- Born: 8 April 1942 (age 84) Hawick, Scotland

Playing information

Rugby union
- Position: Fly-half
Club
Years	Team	Pld	T	G	FG	P
	Hawick YM RFC
	Hawick RFC
	Total	0	0	0	0	0
Representative
Years	Team	Pld	T	G	FG	P
1963	Barbarian F.C.	1

Rugby league
- Position: Stand-off
Club
Years	Team	Pld	T	G	FG	P
1963–68	Leeds	153	32	0	0	96
1968–70	Bradford Northern	58	8	0	0	24
1970–75	York
1975–78	New Hunslet	102	7	0	0	21
	Total	313	47	0	0	141
Representative
Years	Team	Pld	T	G	FG	P
1965	Commonwealth XIII	1
1965	Other Nationalities	1
- Relatives: Alex Fiddes (uncle)

Andrew "Drew" Broatch (born 8 April 1942) is a Scottish former rugby union, and professional rugby league footballer who played in the 1960s and 1970s. He played invitational level rugby union for Barbarian F.C., and at club level Hawick YM RFC and Hawick RFC, as a fly-half and representative level rugby league for Other Nationalities and Commonwealth XIII, and at club level for Leeds, Bradford Northern, New Hunslet and York, as a centre, or stand-off.

== Playing career ==
=== International honours ===
Drew Broatch represented Other Nationalities (RL) while at Leeds, he played stand-off in the 2–19 defeat by St. Helens at Knowsley Road, St. Helens on Wednesday 27 January 1965, to mark the switching-on of new floodlights, and represented Commonwealth XIII (RL) while at Leeds in 1965 against New Zealand at Crystal Palace National Recreation Centre, London on Wednesday 18 August 1965.

=== County Cup Final appearances ===
Drew Broatch played at centre in Leeds' 2–18 defeat by Wakefield Trinity in the 1964–65 Yorkshire Cup Final during the 1964–65 season at Fartown Ground, Huddersfield on Saturday 31 October 1964.

== Personal life ==
Drew Broatch is the nephew of the Scottish rugby union, rugby league footballer, and rugby league coach; Alex Fiddes.
