= John Sheridan (rugby league) =

English RL coach and former rugby league footballer

Personal information
- Born: 24 November 1933; Pontefract, England
- Died: 13 November 2012 (aged 78); Castleford, England

Playing information
- Height: 6 ft 0 in (1.83 m)
- Weight: 15 st 0 lb (95 kg)
- Position: Centre, Loose forward
Club
Years	Team	Pld	T	G	FG	P
1955–66	Castleford	301	86	2	1	264

Coaching information
Club
Years	Team	Gms	W	D	L	W%
1972–73	Castleford	44	30	0	14	68
1974	Leeds
≤1984–≥89	Doncaster
	Total	44	30	0	14	68

John Sheridan (24 November 1933 – 13 November 2012) was an English professional rugby league footballer who played in the 1950s and 1960s, and coached in the 1970s and 1980s. He played at club level for Lock Lane ARLFC, and Castleford (captain), as a centre, or loose forward, and coached at club level for Castleford, Leeds and Doncaster.

== Honoured at Castleford Tigers ==
Sheridan is a Tigers Hall of Fame Inductee. He joined Castleford from local side Lock Lane, choosing his home town club over Hunslet F.C.

During the early part of his career he was a strong running centre who regularly topped the club's try scoring lists. After the 1958/59 season John moved into the pack, and took up the loose forward role. He was named captain as the club began to climb the league table in the early 1960s. Injuries took a toll, and he moved into coaching. From 1964 to 1982, Sheridan was "A" team coach at Castleford, winning nine Yorkshire Senior Championships, and six Yorkshire Senior Cups. Sheridan was the coach of Castleford, his first game in charge was on 18 August 1972, and his last game in charge was on 2 May 1973, and then spent the following year at arch rivals Leeds before returning to Wheldon Road. He returned to coaching at Doncaster, and turned the club around. He was voted the most influential person in the club's history by the Dons fans.

== Background ==
Sheridan was born in Pontefract, of Irish, and English parentage, and grew up in the Wheldon Lane area of Castleford in a large Catholic family. As part of his National Service he joined the Royal Air Force for two years, mainly working as a bar man in the officers mess, and playing Rugby Union. Once back in Castleford he signed for Castleford, and also worked in industry alongside his rugby league career.
