= Len Garbett =

English RL coach and former rugby league footballer

Personal information
- Full name: Leonard Garbett
- Born: 1919; Pontefract district, England
- Died: 2009 (aged 89–90)

Playing information
Club
Years	Team	Pld	T	G	FG	P
1937–42	Castleford	8	1	0	0	3

Coaching information
Club
Years	Team	Gms	W	D	L	W%
1956–57	Castleford	62	18	3	41	29

Leonard Garbett (1919 – 2009) was an English professional rugby league footballer who played in the 1930s and 1940s, and coached in the 1950s. He played at club level for Castleford, and coached at club level for Castleford.

== Background ==
Len Garbett's birth was registered in Pontefract district, West Riding of Yorkshire, in 1986. He served in World War II. Len Garbett wrote and privately published a 160-Page soft-backed book entitled 'Castleford R.L.F.C. A Sixty Years History 1926 – 1986', and he died aged 89–90.

== Playing career ==
=== County League appearances ===
Len Garbett played in Castleford's victory in the Yorkshire League during the 1938–39 season.

== Coaching career ==
=== Club career ===
Len Garbett was the coach of Castleford, his first game in charge was on Saturday 18 August 1956, and his last game in charge was on Saturday 30 November 1957.
