= Alex Fiddes =

Scottish rugby league footballer and RL coach

Personal information
- Full name: Alexander Erskine Fiddes
- Born: 2 January 1914; Hawick, Roxburghshire, Scotland
- Died: 1998 (aged 84); Huddersfield, West Yorkshire, England

Playing information

Rugby union
- Position: Centre
Club
Years	Team	Pld	T	G	FG	P
≤1933–33	Hawick RFC

Rugby league
- Position: Centre
Club
Years	Team	Pld	T	G	FG	P
1933–47	Huddersfield	467	233	184		1067
194?–4?	→Castleford (guest)	0	0	0	0	0
	Total	467	233	184	0	1067
Representative
Years	Team	Pld	T	G	FG	P
1937	British Empire XIII	1

Coaching information
Club
Years	Team	Gms	W	D	L	W%
	Huddersfield
1952–54	Batley
	Total	0	0	0	0
- Relatives: Andrew Broatch (nephew)

Alexander Erskine Fiddes (2 January 1914 – 1998) was a Scottish rugby union and professional rugby league footballer who played in the 1930s and 1940s, and coached rugby league in the 1940s and 1950s. He played club level rugby union (RU) for Hawick RFC, and representative level rugby league (RL) for British Empire XIII, and at club level for Huddersfield (captain) and Castleford, as a centre, and coached club level rugby league (RL) for Huddersfield and Batley.

== Family ==
Fiddes was born in Hawick to John Fiddes, an ammonia worker, and Elizabeth Renton Erksine Fiddes.

== Playing career ==
=== International honours ===
Alex Fiddes represented British Empire XIII (RL) while at Huddersfield in the 15–0 victory over France at Stade Buffalo, Paris on Monday 1 November 1937.

=== Challenge Cup Final appearances ===
Alex Fiddes played at centre and scored a try in Huddersfield's 8–11 defeat by Castleford in the 1934–35 Challenge Cup Final during the 1934–35 season at Wembley Stadium, London on Saturday 4 May 1935, in front of a crowd of 39,000. During Alex Fiddes' time at Huddersfield, they had a 21–17 victory over Hull F.C. in the 1933 Challenge Cup Final during the 1932–33 season at Wembley Stadium, London on Saturday 6 May 1933, and a 13–9 aggregate victory over Bradford Northern in the 1944–45 Challenge Cup Final during the 1944–45 season; the 7–4 victory in the first-leg at Fartown Ground, Huddersfield, and the 6–5 victory in the second-leg at Odsal Stadium, Bradford.

=== County Cup Final appearances ===
Alex Fiddes played at centre, was captain, and scored two goals in Huddersfield's 18–10 victory over Hull F.C. in the 1938 Yorkshire Cup Final during the 1938–39 season at Odsal Stadium, Bradford on Saturday 22 October 1938.

=== Testimonial match ===
Alex Fiddes benefit/testimonial match at Huddersfield took place against Salford at Fartown Ground, Huddersfield on Saturday 12 October 1946, the testimonial match earned him in excess of £500 (based on increases in average earnings, this would be approximately £49,450 in 2016), at the time of the testimonial match he had captained Huddersfield 430 times in 455 appearances, he went on make 12 further appearances, with a final total of 467 appearances for Huddersfield.

=== Club career ===
Alex Fiddes was signed from Hawick RFC, where he was a teammate of 'the voice of rugby'; Bill McLaren, by Huddersfield on 13 October 1933.

== Coaching career ==
=== County Cup Final appearances ===
Alex Fiddes was the coach in Batley's 8–18 defeat by Huddersfield in the 1952–53 Yorkshire Cup Final during the 1952–53 season at Headingley, Leeds on Saturday 15 November 1952.

=== Club career ===
Alex Fiddes was the coach of Batley from July 1952 until March 1954, Batley finished 21st out of 30 during the 1952–53 season, and 24th out of 30 during the 1953–54 season.

== Genealogical information ==
Alex Fiddes was the father of; the rugby union footballer who played in the 1950s and 1960s for Huddersfield R.U.F.C. (captain) Ian E. Fiddes (1935 – 5 October 2017 (aged 82)), the twins; John C. Fiddes, and the rugby union footballer for Huddersfield R.U.F.C. William "Bill" B. Fiddes, and Alec E. Fiddes, and the uncle of the rugby union, and rugby league footballer Andrew Broatch.
