= Jimmy Robinson (rugby league) =

England international rugby league footballer

Personal information
- Full name: James Robinson
- Born: 3 February 1915
- Died: March 1992 (aged 77) Castleford

Playing information
- Position: Centre
Club
| Years | Team | Pld | T | G | FG | P |
|---|---|---|---|---|---|---|
| 1938–53 | Castleford | 184 | | 0 | 0 | 81 |
| 1943–43 | → Dewsbury (guest) |
| 1944–44 | → Wigan (guest) | 1 | 1 | 0 | 0 | 3 |
| 1943–44 | → Oldham (guest) | 4 | 0 | 0 | 0 | 0 |
| 1944–44 | → St Helens (guest) | 1 | 0 | 0 | 0 | 0 |
| | Total | 190 | 1 | 0 | 0 | 84 |
Representative
| Years | Team | Pld | T | G | FG | P |
| 1938 | Lancashire | 1 | 0 | 0 | 0 | 0 |
| 1944 | England | 1 | 0 | 0 | 0 | 0 |

James Robinson (3 Feb 1915 – Mar 1992) was an English professional rugby league footballer who played in the 1930s, 1940s and 1950s. He played at representative level for England, and at club level for Castleford, as a centre. He also appeared for both Wigan and rivals St Helens, plus Oldham RLFC as a World War II guest player.

== Playing career ==
=== International honours ===
Jimmy Robinson won a cap for England while at Castleford in 1944 against Wales.

=== County League appearances ===
Jimmy Robinson played in Castleford's victory in the Yorkshire League during the 1938–39 season.

=== Club career ===
Robinson made his début for Wigan as a World War II guest player, he played centre, and scored a try in the 6-3 victory over Barrow at Central Park, Wigan on Saturday 14 April 1945.
