= John Towill =

British figure skating coach

John Towill coached and choreographed national and international champions in dance, freestyle, pairs, and synchronized ice skating. He is a member of the National Ice Skating Association, U.S. Figure Skating, PSA, and the Ice Skating Institute. He was a member of the Great Britain International Team and a Great Britain Professional Champion. Towill was the head coach of the Precisely Right synchronized skating team from Mennen Arena in Morris Plains, New Jersey, United States.
