= George Bunter =

England international rugby league footballer

Personal information
- Full name: George Bunter

Playing information

Rugby union
Club
Years	Team	Pld	T	G	FG	P
19??–32	West Hartlepool
Representative
Years	Team	Pld	T	G	FG	P
1932	Durham	1

Rugby league
- Position: Second-row
Club
Years	Team	Pld	T	G	FG	P
1932–≥40	Broughton Rangers
≤1944–≥44(guest)	→ Dewsbury
	Total	0	0	0	0	0
Representative
Years	Team	Pld	T	G	FG	P
1940	England	1	0	0	0	0

George Bunter was an English former professional rugby league footballer who played in the 1940s. He played at representative level for England, and at club level for Broughton Rangers and Dewsbury (World War II guest), as a second-row.

== Playing career ==
=== Club career ===
Bunter played rugby union for West Hartlepool, and represented Durham at county level. In January 1932, he switched codes to rugby league, signing for Broughton Rangers.

Bunter played at second-row in Dewsbury's 14-25 aggregate defeat by Wigan in the Championship Final during the 1943–44 season; the 9-13 first-leg defeat at Central Park, Wigan on Saturday 13 May 1944, and the 5-12 second-leg defeat at Crown Flatt, Dewsbury on Saturday 20 May 1944.

=== International honours ===
George Bunter won a cap for England while at Broughton Rangers in 1940 against Wales.
