= Alex Givvons =

Wales international rugby league & union footballer

Personal information
- Full name: Alexander Givvons
- Born: 2 November 1913 Pillgwenlly, Newport, Wales
- Died: 14 June 2002 (aged 88) Oldham, England

Playing information

Rugby union
- Position: Scrum-half
Club
Years	Team	Pld	T	G	FG	P
≤1932–32	Cross Keys RFC

Rugby league
- Position: Scrum-half, Loose forward
Club
Years	Team	Pld	T	G	FG	P
1932–≥42	Oldham	241	54	0	0	162
≥1942–≤48	Huddersfield
1948–49	Oldham
	Total	241	54	0	0	162
Representative
Years	Team	Pld	T	G	FG	P
1936–39	Wales	6	0	0	0	0

Alexander Givvons (2 November 1913 – 14 June 2002) was a Welsh rugby union and professional rugby league footballer who played in the 1930s and 1940s. He played club level rugby union (RU) for Cross Keys RFC, as a scrum-half, and representative level rugby league (RL) for Wales, and at club level for Oldham (two spells) and Huddersfield, as a scrum-half or loose forward.

== Background ==
Alex Givvons was born in Pillgwenlly, Newport, Wales, he died aged 88 in Oldham, Greater Manchester, England.

== Playing career ==
=== International honours ===
Alex Givvons won caps for Wales (RL) while at Oldham 1936–1939 6-caps.

=== Challenge Cup Final appearances ===
Alex Givvons played in Huddersfield's 7–4 victory over Bradford Northern in the first-leg of the 1944–45 Challenge Cup Final during the 1944–45 season at Fartown Ground, Huddersfield, and in the 6–5-second-leg victory at Odsal Stadium, Bradford.

=== County Cup Final appearances ===
During Alex Givvons' time at Oldham, they had a 12–0 victory over St Helens Recs in the 1933–34 Lancashire Cup Final during the 1933–34 season at Station Road, Swinton on Saturday 18 November 1933.

== Honoured at Oldham RLFC ==
Alex Givvons is an Oldham Hall of Fame Inductee.

== Honoured in Oldham ==
Givvons Fold in Oldham is named after Alex Givvons.

== Personal life ==
Givvons married Eunice Clayton in 1934 and had two sons; Alex, who was also a rugby league player, and Trevor.
