= Ted Sadler =

England dual-code rugby international footballer

Personal information
- Full name: Edward Harry Sadler
- Born: 8 May 1910 Colchester, England
- Died: 26 December 1992 (aged 82) Surbiton, England

Playing information

Rugby union
- Position: Flanker
Representative
Years	Team	Pld	T	G	FG	P
1933	England	2	1	0	0	3

Rugby league
- Position: Loose forward, Second-row
Club
Years	Team	Pld	T	G	FG	P
1933–34	Oldham	25	6	0		18
1934–40	Castleford	185	54	0		162
1941	→ Wigan (guest)	3	0	0		0
	Total	213	60	0	0	180
Representative
Years	Team	Pld	T	G	FG	P
1933–39	England	2	0	0	0	0

Edward Sadler (8 May 1910 – 26 December 1992) was an English dual-code international rugby union and rugby league footballer who played in the 1930s and 1940s. He played representative level rugby union (RU) for England, and whilst serving with the Royal Corps of Signals for the Army Rugby Union, and representative level rugby league (RL) for England, and at club level for Oldham and Castleford. He also appeared for Wigan as a World War II guest player.

== Career ==
=== Rugby union ===
Born in Colchester, Essex, Sadler started his career playing rugby union in the Army. In 1933, he was selected to play for England, winning two caps.

=== Switch to rugby league ===
Later that year, Sadler joined rugby league side Oldham. He made his début, and scored his first try, against Broughton Rangers in August 1933. He scored six tries in 25 appearances for the club before joining Castleford in 1934. At that time, he was a "skilled bus driver".

Edward Sadler won a cap for England while at Oldham in the 13-63 defeat by Australia during the 1933–34 Kangaroo tour of Great Britain match at Stade Pershing, Paris on Sunday 31 December 1933, he also won a cap while at Castleford in 1939 against Wales.

=== County League appearances ===
Sadler played in Castleford's victory in the Yorkshire League during the 1938–39 season.

=== Challenge Cup Final appearances ===
Sadler played loose forward in Castleford's 11–8 victory over Huddersfield in the 1935 Challenge Cup Final during the 1934–35 season at Wembley Stadium, London on Saturday 4 May 1935, in front of a crowd of 39,000.
