= Eric Burchmore =

- Born: 18 June 1920; Thornaby-on-Tees, England
- Died: 11 October 1994 (aged 74)
- Military career
- Allegiance: United Kingdom
- Branch: Royal Air Force
- Service years: 1936–1975
- Rank: Air Commodore
- Commands: No. 30 Maintenance Unit RAF (1962–66)
- Conflicts: Second World War
- Awards: Commander of the Order of the British Empire

Air Commodore Eric Burchmore, CBE (18 June 1920 – 11 October 1994) was a Royal Air Force officer with a long and distinguished career. During the late 1960s and early 1970s, Burchmore led the introduction of the Hawker Siddeley Harrier aircraft into RAF service.

== Early life ==
Eric Burchmore was born on 18 June 1920, in Thornaby-on-Tees, the son of a steel worker and was educated at the Robert Atkinson School. After leaving school, Burchmore joined the Royal Air Force (RAF) with the ambition of being a pilot, however he was turned down for pilot training due to his defective colour vision and trained to be an aircraft engineer instead. He served for three years as an apprentice at RAF Halton, followed by a posting to RAF Kenley as an aircraft fitter.

== Second World War ==
Burchmore served at Kenley throughout the Battle of Britain. Later in the war, Burchmore was commissioned as an engineering officer and was posted to No. 159 Squadron based in India.

In October 1944, No. 159 Squadron mounted an audacious minelaying raid on the Japanese held port of Penang. The mission entailed a round trip of over 3,000 miles, which at the time was the longest distance bombing raid in history. Burchmore was in charge of the modification and preparation of the Consolidated Liberator aircraft used for the mission. The raid was led by Wing Commander James Blackburn and was a complete success, with the port of Penang completely blocked by mines and all of the aircraft and crews returning safely. Burchmore was appointed a military Member of the Order of the British Empire in recognition of his contribution to the operation, while Wing Commander Blackburn was awarded a Bar to his Distinguished Service Order and was also awarded the United States Distinguished Flying Cross by the United States Air Force.

== Postwar career ==
After being invalided home with amoebic dysentery, Burchmore retrained as an electrical engineer and served in various postings at home and overseas. In 1952 he was posted to the Far East as an engineer responsible for a squadron of flying boats, this was followed by various other postings including Cyprus in 1960–62.

In 1968, Burchmore was appointed head of the RAF project to introduce the Hawker Siddeley Harrier jump jet into RAF service. Burchmore remained in charge of the Harrier programme for more than six years and participated in negotiations with the United States, which led to the Harrier being bought by the United States Marine Corps.

In 1972, Burchmore was appointed a Commander of the Order of the British Empire.

Burchmore retired from the RAF in 1975 and took up a position as deputy director of housing for the London Borough of Camden. Burchmore resigned from his post five years later following a series of disputes with the Labour controlled council over the sale of council houses, a policy which they opposed, but which Burchmore supported.

In 1981, Burchmore joined a defence company as a manager, where he remained until his retirement in 1984.

During his retirement, Burchmore devoted much of his time to voluntary work and playing golf. He also became secretary of the Batti-Wallahs Society, which is an association of marine electrical engineers. Burchmore qualified for membership due to his work on flying boats.

Eric Burchmore died from a heart attack whilst driving his car on 11 October 1994. He was survived by his wife Margaret and their daughter.
