= Richard Crossley =

English footballer

Personal information
- Full name: Richard Mark Crossley
- Date of birth: 5 September 1970 (age 56)
- Place of birth: Huddersfield, West Riding of Yorkshire, England
- Position: Defender

Youth career
- 1987–1989: Huddersfield Town

Senior career*
Years	Team	Apps	(Gls)
1989–1991	York City	8	(0)
- Michelotti
Total		8	(0)
- * Club domestic league appearances and goals

Richard Mark Crossley (born 5 September 1970) is an English former professional footballer who played as a defender in the Football League for York City, in Hong Kong football for Michelotti and was on the books of Huddersfield Town without making a league appearance. Later he played in Hong Kong and China.
