= Harold Haley (rugby league) =

English rugby league footballer

Personal information
- Full name: Harold Haley
- Born: unknown
- Died: unknown

Playing information
- Position: Hooker
Club
Years	Team	Pld	T	G	FG	P
1932–48	Castleford	338	11	0	3	39
Representative
Years	Team	Pld	T	G	FG	P
1938	Yorkshire	1

Harold Haley (birth unknown – death unknown) was a professional rugby league footballer who played in the 1930s and 1940s. He played at representative level for Yorkshire, and at club level for Castleford, as a hooker.

== Playing career ==
=== County honours ===
Harold Haley won a cap for Yorkshire while at Castleford, he played hooker in the 10–10 draw with Lancashire at Headingley, Leeds on Wednesday 26 October 1938.

=== County League appearances ===
Harold Haley played in Castleford's victories in the Yorkshire League during the 1932–33 season and 1938–39 season.

=== Challenge Cup Final appearances ===
Harold Haley played hooker in Castleford's 11–8 victory over Huddersfield in the 1934–35 Challenge Cup Final at Wembley Stadium, London on Saturday 4 May 1935, in front of a crowd of 39,000.

== Honoured at Castleford Tigers ==
Harold Haley is a Tigers Hall Of Fame Inductee.
