= Charlie Seeling =

NZ international rugby union & league footballer

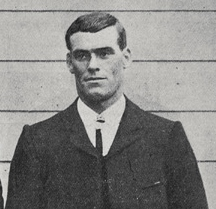

Personal information
- Full name: Charles Edward Seeling
- Born: 14 May 1883 Wanganui, New Zealand
- Died: 29 May 1956 (aged 73) Stalybridge, England

Playing information
- Height: 6 ft 0 in (183 cm)
- Weight: 13 st 10 lb (87 kg)

Rugby union
- Position: Loose forward
Club
Years	Team	Pld	T	G	FG	P
1904–09	City
Representative
Years	Team	Pld	T	G	FG	P
1904–08	New Zealand	39 (11)	11 (2)	0	0	33 (6)

Rugby league
- Position: Forward
Club
Years	Team	Pld	T	G	FG	P
1910–23	Wigan	245	88	0	0	264
- Relatives: Charlie Seeling Jr. (son)

Charles Edward "Bronco" Seeling (14 May 1883 – 29 May 1956) was a New Zealand international rugby football player of the early 20th century.

He was born in Wanganui and attended Wanganui District High School. After 5 games for Wanganui in 1903 he moved to Auckland where he continued to play provincial representative rugby. He played in the forwards for the original All Blacks, appearing in 11 tests including the famous "Match of the Century" against Wales.

Seeling then traveled to Great Britain armed with a 'letter of introduction' from a colleague. He signed with English rugby league club, Wigan in 1910. During the 1912–13 season Seeling played as a front-row forward and scored a try in Wigan's 21-5 victory over Rochdale Hornets in the 1912 Lancashire Cup Final at Weaste, Salford, on Wednesday 11 December 1912.

Seeling went on to make over 200 first grade appearances for the club over thirteen years, playing as captain for three of them. He scored 54 tries for Wigan and appeared in three consecutive championship finals. Noted British rugby writer, E. H. D. Sewell, wrote of Seeling: "Search where one may, a better forward than Seeling does not exist."

He spent the rest of his life in Britain, dying in 1956 at the age of 73 in a car accident.

In 1996 Seeling was inducted into the New Zealand Sports Hall of Fame as well as the international Rugby League Hall of Fame. In 2001 he was inducted as one of the NZRL Legends of League. Seeling's son, Charlie Seeling Jr. also played rugby league, playing at club level for Warrington, becoming captain of Dewsbury, and playing at representative level for Dominion XIII. A shared benefit match for; Percy Coldrick, Charlie Seeling, and Frank Walford took place in April 1925.
