= Billy Davies (Welsh rugby) =

GB international rugby league footballer

Personal information
- Full name: William H./J. Davies
- Born: unknown
- Died: unknown

Playing information

Rugby union
Club
| Years | Team | Pld | T | G | FG | P |
|---|---|---|---|---|---|---|
| | Llanelli RFC |

Rugby league
- Position: Stand-off
Club
| Years | Team | Pld | T | G | FG | P |
|---|---|---|---|---|---|---|
| 1931–37 | Castleford | 204 | 25 | 0 | 5 | 85 |
| 1937–38/39 | Featherstone Rovers | 23 | 1 | 0 | 0 | 3 |
| | Total | 227 | 26 | 0 | 5 | 88 |
Representative
| Years | Team | Pld | T | G | FG | P |
| 1939 | Great Britain | 1 | 0 | 0 | 0 | 0 |

William H. J. Davies (birth unknown – death unknown) was a Welsh rugby union, and professional rugby league footballer who played in the 1930s. He played club level rugby union (RU) for Llanelli RFC, and representative level rugby league (RL) for Great Britain, and at club level for Castleford and Featherstone Rovers as a stand-off.

== Playing career ==
=== International honours ===
Billy Davies won a cap for Great Britain (RL) while at Castleford in 1933 against Australia.

=== County League appearances ===
Billy Davies played in Castleford's victory in the Yorkshire League during the 1932–33 season.

=== Challenge Cup Final appearances ===
Billy Davies played stand-off in Castleford's 11–8 victory over Huddersfield in the 1935 Challenge Cup Final during the 1934–35 season at Wembley Stadium, London on Saturday 4 May 1935, in front of a crowd of 39,000.

=== Club career ===
Billy Davies made his début for Featherstone Rovers on Saturday 2 October 1937.

== Note ==
William Davies' middle initial is variously stated as being 'H' (thecastlefordtigers.co.uk), or 'J' (rugbyleagueproject.org, and Featherstone Rovers printed references).
