= Bernard Cunniffe =

GB & England international rugby league footballer

Personal information
- Full name: Bernard Cunniffe
- Born: c. 1917
- Died: 8 January 2000 (aged 83) Bridlington, England

Playing information
- Position: Wing, Centre
Club
Years	Team	Pld	T	G	FG	P
1933–46	Castleford	184	89	0	0	267
Representative
Years	Team	Pld	T	G	FG	P
1936–38	Yorkshire	4	0	0	0	0
1937	England	1	0	0	0	0
1938	Great Britain	1	0	0	0	0

Bernard Cunniffe (c. 1917 – 8 January 2000) was an English professional rugby league footballer who played in the 1930s and 1940s. He played at representative level for Great Britain, England and Yorkshire, and at club level for Castleford, as a wing or centre.

== Playing career ==
=== Club career ===
Cunniffe played on the wing and scored a try in Castleford's 11-8 victory over Huddersfield in the 1935 Challenge Cup Final during the 1934–35 season at Wembley Stadium, London on Saturday 4 May 1935, in front of a crowd of 39,000.

Cunniffe played in Castleford's victory in the Yorkshire League during the 1938–39 season.

=== Representative honours ===
Cunniffe won a cap for England while at Castleford in 1937 against France, and won a cap for Great Britain while at Castleford in 1937 against Australia.

Cunniffe won caps for Yorkshire while at Castleford. He played on the wing in the 16-10 victory over Cumberland at Workington Town's stadium on 10 October 1936, the 6-28 defeat by Lancashire at Castleford's stadium on 21 October 1936, the 4-8 defeat by Australia at Bradford Northern's stadium on 6 October 1937, and the 9-10 defeat by Lancashire at Rochdale Hornets' stadium on 12 February 1938.
