= George Lewis (rugby league) =

English rugby league footballer

Personal information
- Full name: George Lewis

Playing information
- Position: Fullback
Club
Years	Team	Pld	T	G	FG	P
1929–45	Castleford	373	19	373	11	825
1945	→ Featherstone Rovers (guest)	1	0	0	0	0
	Total	374	19	373	11	825

George Lewis was a professional rugby league footballer who played in the 1920s, 1930s and 1940s. He played at club level for Castleford, and Featherstone Rovers (World War II guest), as a fullback.

== Playing career ==
=== County League appearances ===
George Lewis played in Castleford's victories in the Yorkshire League during the 1932–33 season, and 1938–39 season.

=== Challenge Cup Final appearances ===
George Lewis played fullback in Castleford's 11–8 victory over Huddersfield in the 1935 Challenge Cup Final during the 1934–35 season at Wembley Stadium, London on Saturday 4 May 1935, in front of a crowd of 39,000.

=== Club career ===
George Lewis made his début for Featherstone Rovers on Saturday 14 April 1945.
