= Tommy Taylor (rugby league) =

England international rugby league footballer (1911-1992)

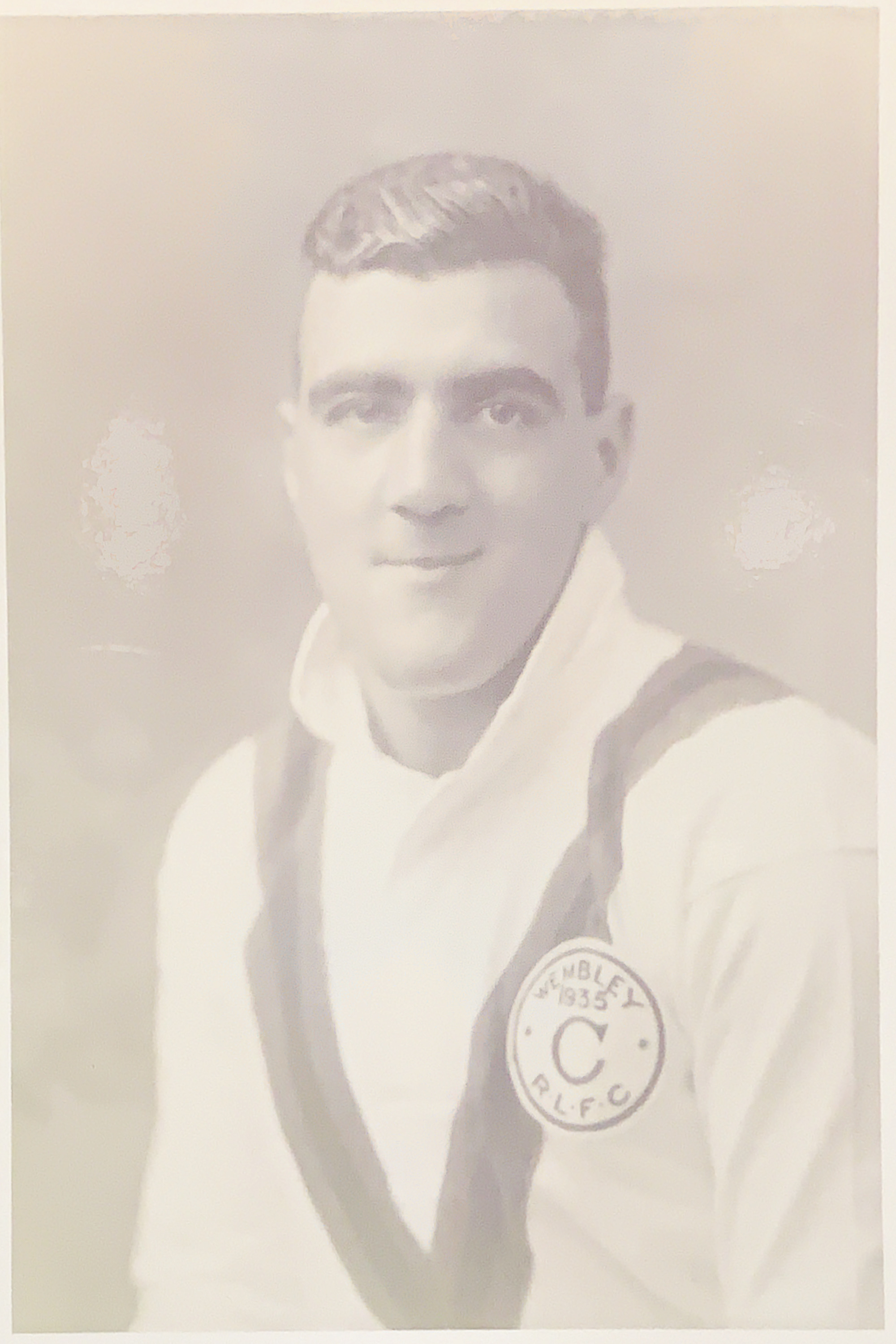

Personal information
- Full name: Thomas Leslie Taylor
- Born: 7 September 1911 Fitzwilliam, West Yorkshire, England
- Died: 22 November 1992 (aged 81) Kinsley, West Yorkshire, England

Playing information
- Position: Prop
Club
Years	Team	Pld	T	G	FG	P
1931–46	Castleford	389	15	0	0	51
Representative
Years	Team	Pld	T	G	FG	P
1935–45	Yorkshire	3	1	0	0	3
1936–38	England	1	0	0	0	0

Thomas Leslie Taylor (7 September 1911 – 22 November 1992) was an English professional rugby league footballer who played in the 1930s and 1940s. He played at representative level for England and Yorkshire, and at club level for Castleford, as a prop.

== Background ==
Taylor was born in Fitzwilliam, West Yorkshire, England, he was married with three sons, and he was a miner for all of his working life. He died in Kinsley, West Yorkshire in 1992, aged 81.

== Playing career ==
=== Club career ===
Taylor played in Castleford's victories in the Yorkshire League during the 1932–33 season and 1938–39 season.

Taylor played at prop in Castleford's 11–8 victory over Huddersfield in the 1934–35 Challenge Cup Final during the 1934–35 season at Wembley Stadium, London on Saturday 4 May 1935, in front of a crowd of 39,000.

=== Representative honours ===
Taylor won a cap for England while at Castleford in 1945 against Wales.

Taylor won caps playing at prop for Yorkshire while at Castleford in the 16–5 victory over Lancashire at Widnes' stadium on 12 October 1935, the 16–16 draw with Lancashire at Swinton's stadium on 10 October 1945, and scoring 1-try in the 45–3 victory over Cumberland at Leeds' stadium on 31 October 1945.
