= Frank Smith Sr. =

English rugby league footballer

Frank Smith
Playing information
- Position: Second-row
Club
Years	Team	Pld	T	G	FG	P
1932–47	Castleford	282	42	13	0	152
≤1943–≥43	→ Dewsbury (guest)	≥4
	Total		42	13	0	152
Representative
Years	Team	Pld	T	G	FG	P
1934	Yorkshire	1	0	0	0	0
- Relatives: Frank Smith Jr. (son)

Frank Smith was a professional rugby league footballer who played in the 1930s and 1940s. He played at representative level for Yorkshire, and at club level for Castleford and Dewsbury (World War II guest), as a second-row.

== Playing career ==
=== County honours ===
Frank Smith won a cap for Yorkshire while at Castleford playing at second-row in the 26-17 victory over Villeneuve at Lawkholme Lane, Keighley on 15 September 1934.

=== County League appearances ===
Frank Smith played in Castleford's victories in the Yorkshire League during the 1932–33 season and 1938–39 season.

=== Challenge Cup Final appearances ===
Frank Smith played at second-row in Castleford's 11-8 victory over Huddersfield in the 1935 Challenge Cup Final during the 1934–35 season at Wembley Stadium, London on Saturday 4 May 1935, in front of a crowd of 39,000.

=== Club career ===
Bradford Northern beat Dewsbury in the Championship play-off semi-final during the 1942–43 season. However, Dewsbury's manager, Eddie Waring, appealed to the Rugby Football League, claiming that Bradford Northern had fielded Wakefield Trinity's Sandy Orford as a guest player, and that Orford was ineligible because prior to the semi-final, he had played only three league matches for Bradford Northern, rather than the regulatory minimum of four league matches, the semi-final actually being Orford's fourth league match. Bradford Northern was disqualified, and Dewsbury went on to a 33-16 aggregate victory over Halifax in the Championship Final. However, a month later, Bradford appealed to the Rugby Football League, claiming that Dewsbury had fielded Castleford's Frank Smith as a guest player, and that Smith was ineligible because prior to the semi-final, he had played only three league matches for Dewsbury, rather than the regulatory minimum of four league matches, though he had played in a number of cup matches. Bradford Northern's appeal was upheld and the Rugby Football League Council fined Dewsbury £100 (based on increases in average earnings, this would be approximately £11,780 in 2013), stripped them of the Championship title, and declared the Championship during the 1942–43 season void.

== Genealogical information ==
Frank Smith was the father of the rugby league footballer; Frank Smith Jr.
