= Patrick McManus (rugby league) =

English rugby league footballer

Personal information
- Full name: Patrick B. McManus

Playing information
- Position: Prop
Club
Years	Team	Pld	T	G	FG	P
1934–47	Castleford	296	16	0	0	48
1943(loan)	→ Wakefield Trinity	1	0	0	0	0
	Total	297	16	0	0	48

Patrick McManus was a professional rugby league footballer who played in the 1930s. He played at club level for Castleford, as a prop.

== Playing career ==
Patrick McManus made almost 300 appearances for Castleford, during his career, he made his Castleford debut on 25 August 1934 at Hunslet, unfortunately finishing up on the losing side, 20 - 10.

Pat’s final game was 7 May 1947 at Workington, which Castleford lost 19-12.

=== Challenge Cup Final appearances ===
Patrick McManus played at prop in Castleford's 11–8 victory over Huddersfield in the 1935 Challenge Cup Final during the 1934–35 season at Wembley Stadium, London on Saturday 4 May 1935, in front of a crowd of 39,000.
