= Charlie Seeling Jr. =

English rugby league footballer and coach

Charlie Seeling
Personal information
- Born: England

Playing information
- Position: Loose forward
Club
| Years | Team | Pld | T | G | FG | P |
|---|---|---|---|---|---|---|
| 1927–34 | Warrington | 195 | 41 | 0 | 0 | 123 |
| 1934–37 | Wigan | 85 | 11 | 10 | 0 | 53 |
| | Dewsbury |
| | Batley |
| ≤1943–≥44 | → Dewsbury (guest) | ≥1 |
| 1944 | → Wigan (guest) | 1 | 0 | 0 | 0 | 0 |
| | Dewsbury |
| | Total | | 52 | 10 | 0 | 176 |
Representative
| Years | Team | Pld | T | G | FG | P |
| 1936–37 | Dominion XIII | 2 | 0 | 1 | 0 | 2 |
- Father: Charlie Seeling

Charlie Seeling, was a New Zealand professional rugby league footballer who played in the 1920s, 1930s and 1940s, and coached in the 1950s. A loose forward he played at representative level for Dominion XIII, and at club level for Warrington, Wigan (two spells, including the second as a World War II guest), Dewsbury (two spells, including the first as a World War II guest) (captain, following the transfer of; Vic Hey) and Batley and coached at club level for amateur side Heckmondwike.

== Playing career ==
=== Championship final appearances ===
Charlie Seeling played loose forward in the second leg of Dewsbury's 14-25 aggregate defeat by Wigan in the Championship Final during the 1943–44 season scoring a penalty in the 5-12 defeat at Crown Flatt, Dewsbury on Saturday 20 May 1944.

=== Club career ===
Seeling made his début for Warrington on Saturday 16 April 1927, and he played his last match for Warrington on Saturday 24 February 1934. He made his début for Wigan in the 7-9 defeat by Swinton at Station Road, Swinton on Saturday 17 March 1934, he scored his first try for Wigan in the 35-10 victory over Hull F.C. at Central Park, Wigan on Saturday 14 April 1934, he scored his last try for Wigan in the 35-5 victory over Rochdale Hornets at Central Park on Saturday 31 October 1936, and he played his last match for Wigan (in his second spell) in the 10-4 victory over Keighley at Lawkholme Lane, Keighley on Saturday 29 January 1944.

== Genealogical information ==
Charlie Seeling Jr. was the son of the NZ rugby union and rugby league footballer; Charlie Seeling.
