= Castleford Tigers =

English professional rugby league football club

Club information
- Full name: Castleford Tigers Rugby League Football Club
- Nickname(s): Classy Cas; Fords; Tigers; Glassblowers
- Short name: Cas
- Colours: Black and Amber
- Founded: 1926; 100 years ago
- Website: castlefordtigers.com

Current details
- Ground: Wheldon Road (10,500)
- Chairman: Martin Jepson
- Coach: Paul Rowley
- Captain: TBC
- Competition: Super League
- 2026 season: 13th

Uniforms
Home colours

Records
- Challenge Cups: 4 (1935, 1969, 1970, 1986)
- Other honours: 16
- Most capped: 613 – John Joyner
- Highest points scorer: 1,870 – Albert Lunn

The Castleford Tigers are a professional rugby league club based in Castleford, West Yorkshire, England. They play their home games at Wheldon Road and compete in the Super League, the top flight of the British rugby league system.

Castleford have won the Challenge Cup on four occasions, most recently in 1986. Although the club has never won a League Championship, they have been runners up three times and won the League Leaders' Shield in 2017.

The club has rivalries with neighbours Featherstone Rovers, Leeds Rhinos and Wakefield Trinity. The club's traditional home colours are black and amber, with orange also being used in recent years.

== History ==
=== 1896–1926: Background and formation ===
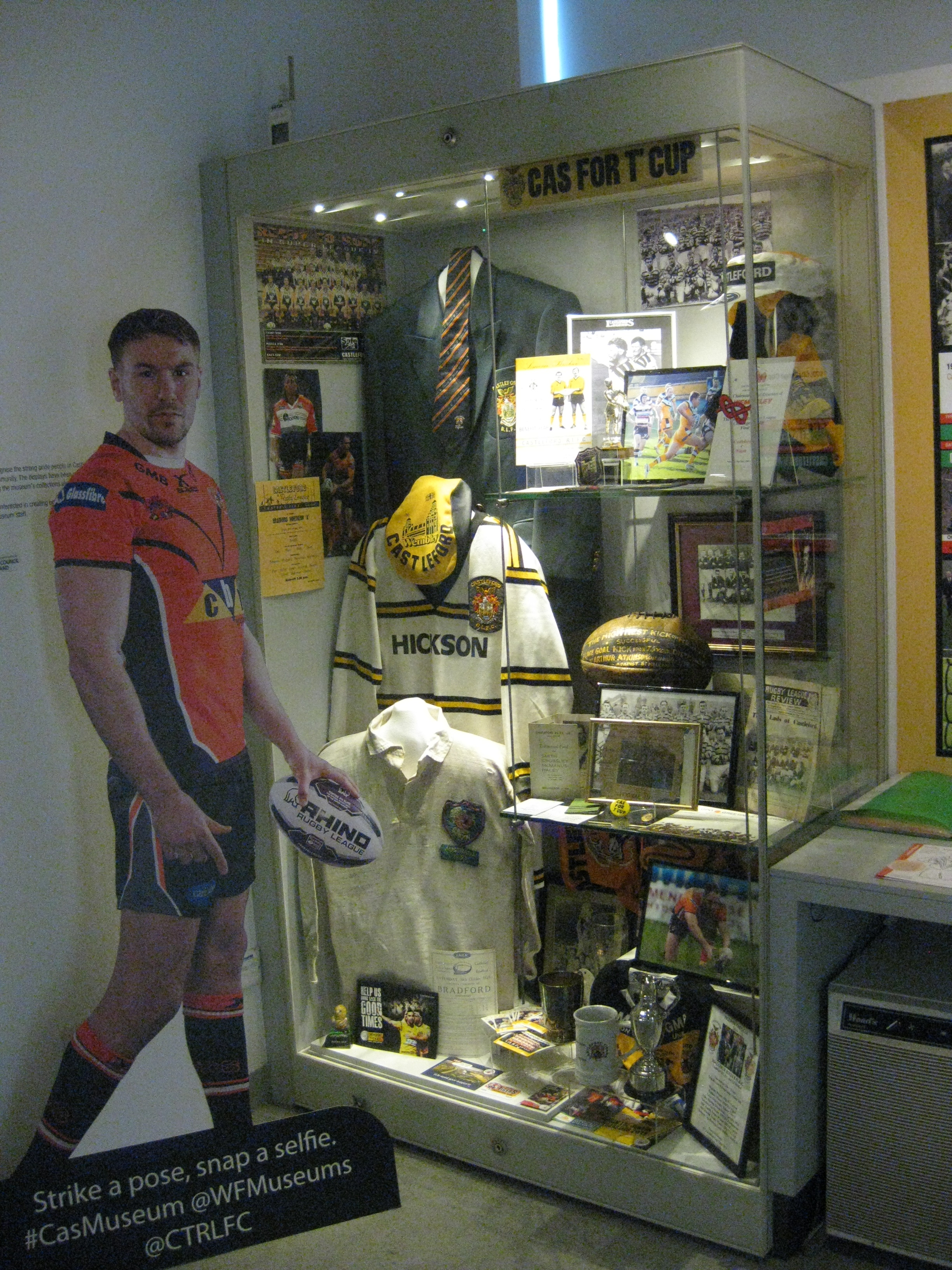
Castleford Tigers memorabilia at the Castleford Forum Museum

Rugby league in the town of Castleford can be traced back to the late nineteenth century. The original Castleford RFC joined the Northern Rugby Football Union in the breakaway league's second year, the 1896–97 season, and remained in the semi-professional ranks for ten seasons until withdrawing at the end of 1905–06. Little is known about this original club, which was not directly connected to the current Castleford Tigers RLFC.

The present club was formed in 1912, although no records are available prior to the team entering the Yorkshire Senior Competition in 1922, where they participated as amateurs for four seasons. An application to become members of the Rugby Football League was rejected out of hand in 1923, with further bids voted down in 1924 and 1925. However, at the RFL annual meeting on 17 February 1926, Castleford were successful in their application and were admitted to the league.

=== 1926–1950s: Establishment in the league ===
Having been elected into the Rugby Football League, Castleford joined the competition for the 1926–27 season. The club professionalised, holding its first directors' meeting on 7 July 1926. They agreed to purchase their current home ground on Wheldon Road and, after a year making improvements, moved there in 1927.

The club soon started to make a mark on northern rugby, claiming their first major trophy when they topped the Yorkshire League in 1932, followed by winning the Challenge Cup in 1935 by defeating Huddersfield 11–8. In 1939, they made it to the Championship final, but lost a close fought game against Salford, 8–6. The Second World War meant the league was suspended soon after, and Castleford officially abstained from league competition until the 1944–45 season.

=== 1960–1972: Success ===
Castleford finished fourth in the national league in the 1962/63 season. The following season they lost 7–5 to Widnes in the Challenge Cup semi-final replay at Belle Vue, Wakefield in front of a 28,700 crowd after drawing at Station Road, Swinton in the first meeting of the two clubs. Under the direction of coach George Clinton, Castleford won many fans in the '60s by playing an open and free-flowing style of rugby, earning them the nicknames "Classy Cas" and "High Speed Cas", the latter playing off the slogan for British Gas in use at the time.

Castleford picked up where they left off when they were again beaten in the Championship finals in 1969, this time conceding defeat to arch-rivals Leeds. However, this loss seemed to spur the team on, and 1969 (v. Salford) and 1970 (v. Wigan) saw Castleford win the Challenge Cup for two consecutive years, with clubs legends Alan Hardisty and Keith Hepworth leading the team.

=== 1973–1995: Consistency ===
First iteration of a tiger motif upon the club crest, succeeding the town coat of arms, and used with slight variations from 1991 to 2025.

John Sheridan was appointed head coach in 1973 for a spell. Castleford finished a respectable ninth in a one-division table but Sheridan stepped down following criticism from fans. During the late 1970s, Castleford edged up the league and in 1985 they made it to the Premiership final, where they were beaten by Hull Kingston Rovers, and to the Yorkshire Cup final defeat to Hull KR at the beginning of the following season. However, in the 1986 Challenge Cup final, Castleford defeated Hull Kingston Rovers in a 15–14 triumph at Wembley Stadium, with Bob Beardmore awarded the Lance Todd Trophy for man-of-the-match. They finished consistently high over the next few years, and finished in the top four clubs in the Championship for four years during 1990–1995.

Darryl van der Velde took Castleford to the Challenge Cup final at Wembley in 1992 where they were defeated by Wigan. A year later, Darryl van der Velde left to become chief executive of the South Queensland Crushers, and was succeeded by his assistant John Joyner.

Through the Darryl van der Velde and early Joyner years, Castleford were lauded for their style and were labelled 'Classy Cas' . This playing style was to come to fruition in 1994, as they defeated a Wigan team to take the Regal Trophy 33–2, they were also semi-finalists in the Challenge Cup and were also defeated in the Premiership final. That season, John Joyner was named Coach of the Year by the RFL. St John Ellis scored a then-club-record 40 tries over the 1993–94 season.

=== 1996–2004: Super League era ===
When a Super League was suggested, Castleford resisted a merger with Wakefield Trinity and Featherstone Rovers, and became a founder member of the Super League in 1996. The team performed weakly at the start of the season causing the resignation of coach John Joyner. The team avoided relegation by a whisker in 1997 following the appointment of Stuart Raper.

The next season, they managed to frustrate the bleak predictions of pundits to move up the league, finishing sixth at the end of the season, after putting in some good performances and pleasing their fans with a sprinkling of victories.

In 1999, they continued on this upward trajectory, finishing fifth, as well as making the semi-finals of both the Challenge Cup and the Grand Final play-offs. This became one of the most famous seasons in the clubs recent past, with fans still remembering it with reverence. The team included many home grown players, such as Danny Orr, and boasted that years Man of Steel winner Adrian Vowles. In 2000, the rise seemed to stall, as they repeated their fifth-place ranking and made the play-offs for a consecutive season. Raper left Castleford midway through the 2001 campaign to take charge of Wigan and his assistant Graham Steadman took over the reins as head coach.

Castleford made the semi-final of the Challenge Cup in 2002, however the team was to fall down the table over the years to come. Gary Mercer guided Castleford to five wins in their last 10 games after replacing Steadman in 2004 but it was too little to save them from the drop as Castleford were relegated for the first time in the club's history. Since the introduction of two divisions for the 1973–74 Northern Rugby Football League season, Castleford had spent 32 years in the top flight of British rugby league. Gary Mercer left the club following their relegation from Super League.

=== 2005–2007: Life in the second tier of Rugby League ===
Dave Woods was appointed head coach and Castleford finished second in the Co-operative Championship in 2005. They were promoted back to the Super League via play-offs following victory in the playoff final against Whitehaven, as well as competing in the Northern Rail Cup final, where they lost to Hull Kingston Rovers.

Terry Matterson joined Castleford in November 2005 in replacement of Woods. Castleford were celebrated for playing a good brand of rugby league, however it was not good enough to stop them from contesting a relegation dog fight which was to culminate in a historic match at Wakefield Trinity's Belle Vue, dubbed 'The Battle of Belle Vue'. It was a fight to stay in the league, and when Castleford lost to Wakefield Trinity, it confirmed their relegation. Many Castleford fans do not accept this relegation and it became a grave point of contention with the governing body. Castleford were relegated from second bottom in front of the newly inducted French side, Catalans Dragons, who had been given immunity from relegation that season, and behind Wigan who had been found guilty of a breach of the salary cap rules.

In 2007, Castleford again made a quick return to Super League as they finished top of the Championship with only one loss all season and defeated Widnes 42–10 in the Co-operative Championship play-off final. Castleford finished bottom of Super League in 2008, but were not relegated due to the newly in place franchise rules.

=== 2009–2012: Re-establishment in Super League ===
In 2009, Castleford saw a brief return to success by reaching the Grand Final play-offs for the first time since Super League VII and made the semi-final of the Challenge Cup in 2011 before being knocked out by Leeds in an 8–10 defeat after extra time. At the end of the season, standout halfback Rangi Chase was announced as the winner of the 2011 Man of Steel award.

Terry Matterson stepped down at the end of the 2011 season to take up a coaching role in Australia and was replaced by former St Helens coach Ian Millward. Millward was released by mutual consent on 9 April 2013 after a poor run of results with 1 win in 18 games and with the team at the bottom of the Super League table. Daryl Powell was appointed head coach in May 2013 taking over from assistant coach Danny Orr, who had been in temporary charge of the club.

=== 2013–2021: Daryl Powell era ===
Under the guidance of Daryl Powell and his assistants Danny Orr and Ryan Sheridan, the Castleford Tigers once again started to see success on and off the field. The 2014 side were again lauded as 'Classy Cas' for their fast-paced and exciting style, built around home grown players such as captain Michael Shenton, Daryl Clark, and Andy Lynch. The team reached the Challenge Cup final in August 2014, losing to local rivals Leeds Rhinos 23–10 in front of a crowd of 77,914 at Wembley Stadium. Castleford missed out on the League Leaders' Shield on the final day of the regular season, eventually finishing 4th after defeat to Catalans. In the play-offs, they were defeated 41–0 by St Helens in their qualifying final, and beaten 14–30 by Warrington in their preliminary semi-final to bring the season to a close. At the end of season awards, Daryl Clark was named both Man of Steel and Young Player of the Year, and Powell was awarded Coach of the Year.

On 29 September 2015, the club announced the death of chairman Jack Fulton.

During the 2016 season, winger Denny Solomona scored 42 tries in all competitions, including 40 in the league, breaking St John Ellis' club record and setting the current Super League record. Coincidingly, scrum-half Luke Gale set the Super League record for try assists, registering 46.

In 2017, the Tigers enjoyed a phenomenal 23 game regular season as they finished 10 points clear at the top of the table before the split, having won 20 and lost just 3 of their games. They went into the Super 8s having already secured a top four play-off spot and lifted the League Leaders' Shield in August, topping the table for the first time in their 91-year history. In the play-off semi-final against St Helens, Luke Gale – just days after undergoing an emergency appendectomy – kicked a drop goal in golden point extra time to send Cas to their first Grand Final with a 23–22 victory. At Old Trafford, Castleford were defeated 24–6 by Leeds Rhinos with a late consolation score from Alex Foster their sole try. Gale was voted Man of Steel, while Powell picked up the Coach of the Year award for the second time. The Tigers were also represented by six inclusions in the Super League Dream Team.

2018 saw Castleford finish the regular season in 3rd position after an injury-hit year, including the loss of key man Luke Gale for several months with a fractured knee-cap. They qualified for a play-off semi-final against Wigan, though were knocked out by the eventual champions. Halfback Jake Trueman was awarded Super League Young Player of the Year.

In the 2019 season, the club finished in 5th place on the Super League table. Castleford reached the second week of the play-offs, where they were defeated by eventual Grand Finalists Salford Red Devils.

Castleford began the 2020 season strongly, however a slump in form following Super League's COVID-19 suspension led to a disappointing 8th-placed finish, their lowest since 2013. Despite this, the inspired form of Paul McShane saw him win the 2020 Man of Steel award.

In the 2021 Challenge Cup, Castleford twice prevailed in golden point extra time to advance to the semi-finals against Warrington, whom they defeated 35–20 to reach Wembley. In the final, Castleford lead St Helens 12–6 at half time but fell to a 26–12 defeat. The Tigers finished the season in 7th position, falling short of play-off qualification in the final round.

=== 2022–present: New era ===
At the conclusion of the 2021 season, Daryl Powell – by then Super League's longest serving head coach – departed Castleford, saying "For both me and the club, it is the right time." Alongside him, numerous long-serving and influential players moved on, including captain Michael Shenton, Grant Millington, and Oliver Holmes. The new head coach was announced as Lee Radford, ushering the club into a new era with a host of signings. Castleford started the 2022 season poorly before climbing into the playoff places by July. The final match of the year, against Leeds, would see the winners advance to the playoffs – the Tigers conceded two late tries to lose 14–6, finishing their season in 7th place.

After a bleak start to the 2023 season, Radford was terminated as head coach on 6 March and replaced by assistant coach Andy Last. Castleford's continued poor form saw them drawn into a relegation scrap with Wakefield, and Last too was dismissed after registering just four wins from nineteen matches. Danny Ward took charge for the final six rounds, with the Tigers eventually finishing in 11th place and narrowly surviving.

Castleford went into the 2024 season under Craig Lingard with a large squad turnover and reduced average age. The team operated with a reduced playing budget as the club prioritised off-field improvements to secure Super League status under the new IMG grading system, and they finished the year in 10th place. In October 2024, board member and investor Martin Jepson negotiated an option agreement to purchase shares owned by the Fulton family, and became chairman with immediate effect. In the following days, Danny McGuire succeeded Lingard as head coach, and Castleford achieved a Grade A license in the 2024 club gradings.

In May 2025, Jepson exercised his option agreement to become majority shareholder and spoke of his commitment to "a stronger Castleford competing in the Super League and the club being sustainable for many generations to come". Poor performances saw McGuire dismissed in July and Castleford ended the season in 11th place, though retained their top-flight status despite dropping to Grade B status in the 2025 gradings.

In September 2025, Castleford unveiled a new crest ahead of the club's centenary year.

In the 2026 Super League season, Castleford endured a difficult campaign finishing second bottom on the table recording just eight wins all season.

== Stadiums ==
=== 1926–27: Sandy Desert ===
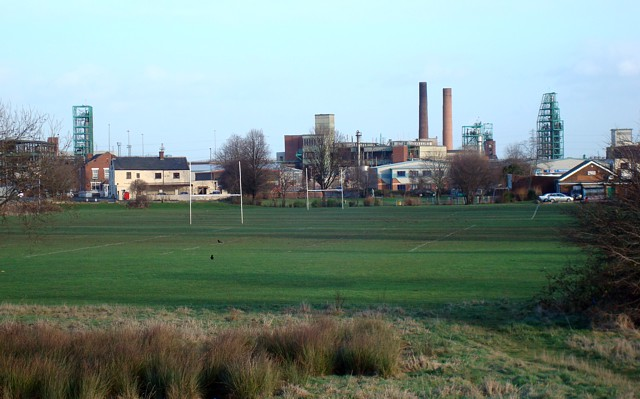
Sandy Desert in 2008

In February 1926, Castleford RLFC were accepted into the Northern Rugby Football League from the 1926–27 season. Within a week of their successful application, the club announced that they had agreed to the purchase of Wheldon Road for their future home. While improvements were carried out, they played their first season as professionals at the Sandy Desert ground, located on the west side of Lock Lane, which had been their home as an amateur side. The site is now used by amateur club Castleford Lock Lane.

=== 1927–present: Wheldon Road ===
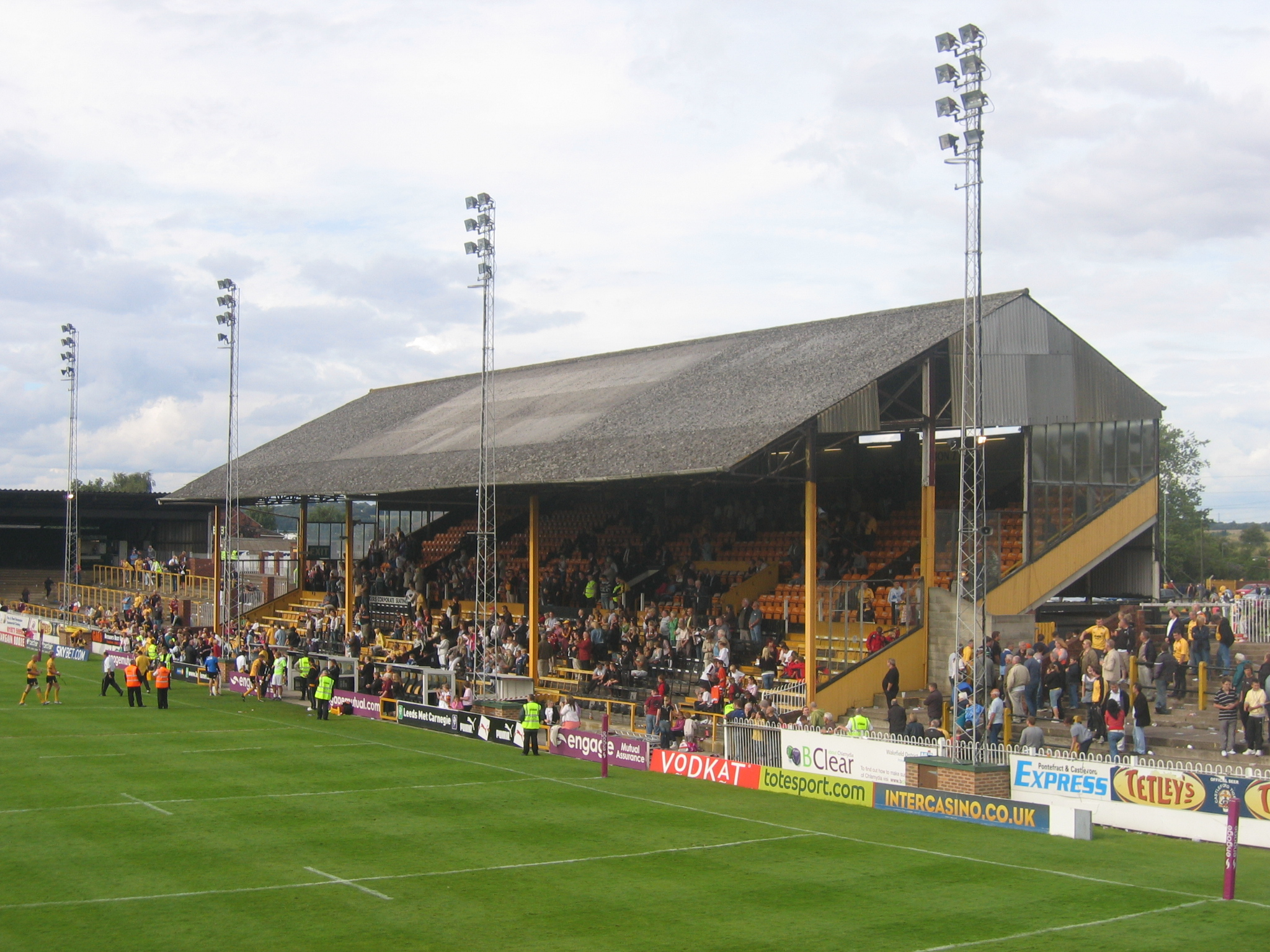
Wheldon Road

Wheldon Road was built in 1926, originally intended to be the home of association football club Castleford Town. In February 1926, within a week of Castleford RLFC's successful application to join the Northern Rugby Football League, the club announced that they had agreed to buy the ground. They had negotiated an £800 loan from the RFL to finance the purchase. The club spent a year making improvements to spectator facilities, reseeding the playing area and replacing the perimeter fencing before finally moving in from the 1927–28 season.

On 9 March 1935, the ground set its record attendance when 25,449 spectators watched Castleford play a third-round Challenge Cup match against Hunslet.

Castleford installed floodlights at Wheldon Road ahead of the 1965–66 season, becoming the seventh rugby league club to do so. This enabled their participation in the inaugural BBC2 Floodlit Trophy.

In the early 2000s, the stadium was renamed The Jungle as a result of sponsorship from online retailer Jungle.com. This moniker proved popular with supporters, with the club seeking to reinstate the name alongside subsequent naming rights holders.

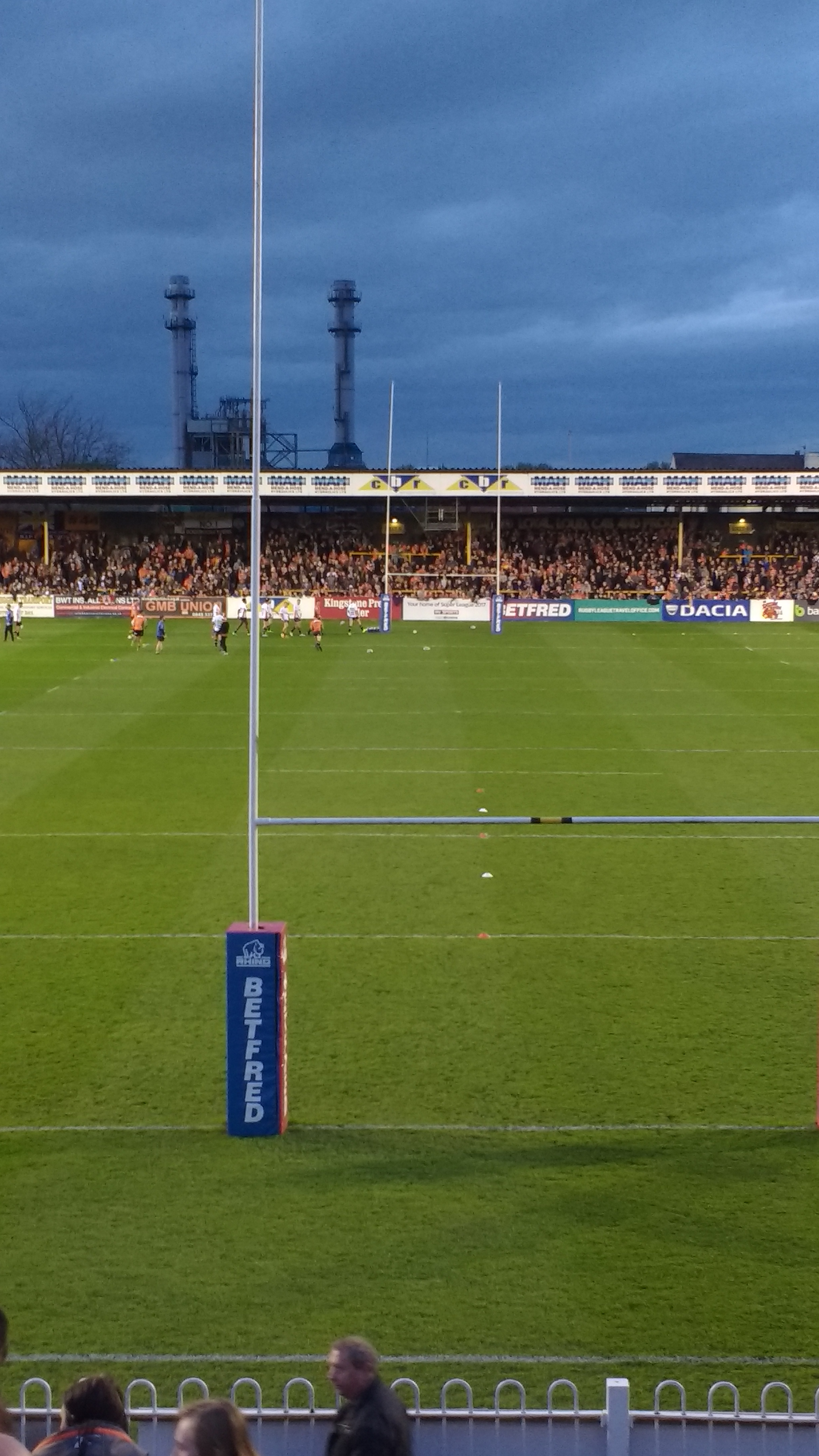

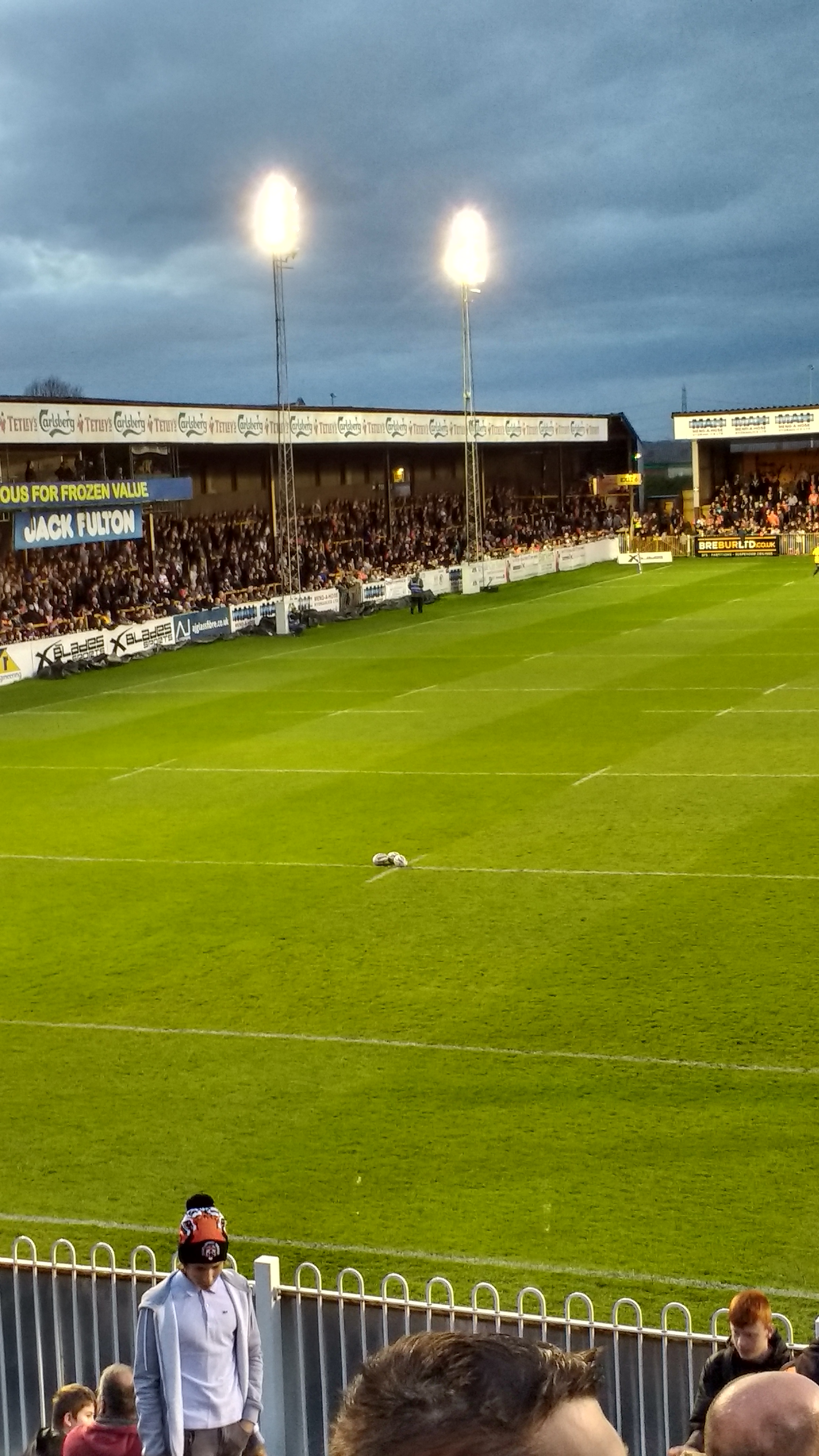

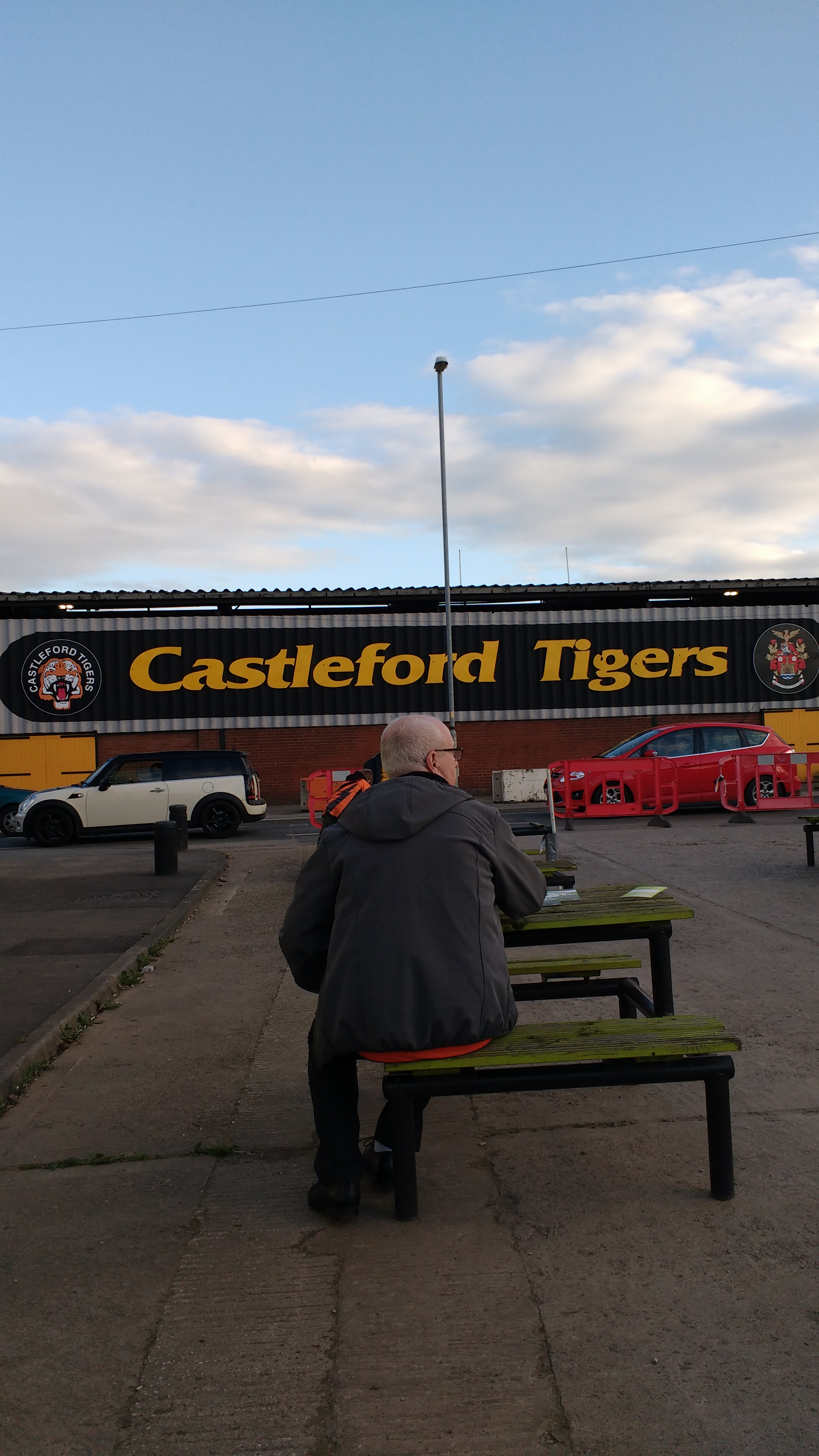

=== Proposed relocations ===
The Lateral Property group submitted a planning application for a proposed £135 million development and Five Towns Stadium in Glasshoughton. Outline planning permission was given to the development in 2015, with Reserved Matters applications to follow. In early 2018, Lateral Property Group announced that site had been renamed Axiom, working with partner Highgrove Plc, a scheme which would include food, a country park and an omni-retail experience. Numerous planning applications have been submitted through Wakefield MDC Planning Department to discharge conditions as well as amend the scheme slightly, with a Reserved Matters application for Phase 1 and 2a of the work approved. The schedule provided by the developers is that work on supporting roads and groundworks will begin in Summer/Autumn 2018 with the stadium to be completed in time for the 2021 season. In July 2018, an application was submitted to increase the capacity of the proposed ground from 10,000 to 10,245.

== Kit sponsors and manufacturers ==
Year(s)	Kit manufacturer	Main shirt sponsor
1983–89	O'Neills	Hickson
1989–91	Bukta	Hickson
1991–95	Ellgren	Hickson
1995–97	Asics	Hickson
1998	OS	Clear Sport
1999	Avec	Safestyle UK
2000	Avec	Jungle.com
2001–02	Exito	Jungle.com
2003–07	Kukri	GMB Union
2008	Puma	GMB Union
2009–10	Puma	Diggerland
2011–12	Puma	Probiz
2013	ISC	Help-Link
2014	ISC	CBR Engineering
2015–19	XBlades	CBR Engineering
2020–21	Club Castleford	CBR Engineering
2022–26	Oxen	CBR Engineering
2027	Oxen	Menzies

== 2027 squad ==
2027 Castleford Tigers Squad
First team squad			Coaching staff
(New Zealand) Renouf Atoni – PR; (England) Jimmy Beckett – PR; (England) Jack Brown – PR, LF; (Australia) Damien Cook – HK; (United States) Tyler Dupree – PR; (Samoa) Mat Feagai – CE, WG; (Jamaica) Ashton Golding – HK, LF; (Australia) Brock Greacen – SR, PR; (United States) George Hill – LF, HK; (Wales) George Hirst – SR; (Scotland) Liam Hood – HK; (England) Alfie Johnson – WG, CE; (England) Jordan Lane – SR	(Australia) Phoenix Laulu-Togaga'e – FB; (England) George Lawler – PR, LF, SR; (England) Alfie Lindsey – WG; (Samoa) Mason Lino – SH; (Australia) Krystian Mapapalangi – CE; (England) Darnell McIntosh – CE, WG; (England) Ben McNamara – HK, SO; (England) Robbie Mulhern – PR; (Fiji) Jason Qareqare – WG; (England) Fletcher Rooney – FB; (England) Daniel Sarbah – WG; (Ireland) Louis Senior – WG, CE; (England) Tylor Sharpe – FB, WG	(Australia) Tyrell Sloan – FB; (Australia) Blake Taaffe – SO, FB; (Australia) Jack Todd – LF, PR; (Fiji) Semi Valemei – WG, CE; (Australia) Tom Weaver (gk) – SH; (England) Joe Westerman – LF, PR; (England) Jenson Windley – SH, FB	Head coach: (England) Paul Rowley; Assistant coaches: (England) Luke Robinson; (Ireland) Simon Grix; Legend: (c) Captain(s); (vc) Vice-captain(s); (gk) Goal kicker; Updated: 11 November 2026; Source(s):

== 2027 transfers ==
=== Transfers in ===
Player	From	Contract	Date	Ref.
(Australia) Damien Cook	St. George Illawarra Dragons	2 years	8 May 2026	
(Samoa) Mat Feagai	St. George Illawarra Dragons	3 years	15 May 2026	
(England) Robbie Mulhern	Leigh Leopards	3 years	16 July 2026	
(England) Alfie Johnson	Halifax Panthers	2 years	17 July 2026	
(Australia) Tyrell Sloan	St. George Illawarra Dragons	2 years	17 July 2026	
(Samoa) Mason Lino	Wakefield Trinity	2 years	8 September 2026	
(England) Ben McNamara	Leigh Leopards	2 years	9 September 2026	
(Australia) Jack Todd	Canterbury Bulldogs	2 years	11 November 2026	

=== Transfers out ===
No	Player	To	Contract	Date	Ref.
25	(England) Sam Hall	Toulouse Olympique	2 years	30 August 2026	
6	(Samoa) Daejarn Asi	Brisbane Tigers	1 year	9 September 2026	
13	(Australia) Joe Stimson	Temora Dragons	1 year	9 September 2026	
27	(England) Cain Robb	Released		9 September 2026	
12	(England) Alex Mellor	Catalans Dragons	2 years	11 September 2026	
5	(Fiji) Mikaele Ravalawa	Released		11 November 2026	
20	(England) Aiden Doolan	Released		11 November 2026	

== Staff directory ==
=== Board of directors ===
Staff	Position
Martin Jepson	Chairman
Steve Vause	Vice Chairman
Danny Wilson	Chief Executive Officer
Martin Brown	Board member
Phil Alexander	Non-executive board member

=== Elite performance ===
Staff	Position
Chris Chester	Director of Rugby Operations
Paul Rowley	Head Coach
Luke Robinson	Assistant Coach
Simon Grix	Assistant Coach
Marc Sneyd	Technical Coach
Gareth Whittaker	Head of Performance
Tom Watkins	Senior Strength & Conditioning Coach
Dr Nick Raynor	Head of Medical Services & Club Doctor
Josh Heuvel	Analyst
Tom Pearson	Head Physiotherapist
Hannah Martin	Assistant First-Team Physiotherapist

=== Youth development ===
Staff	Position
Matty Faulkner	Head of Youth Development
Tom Schofield	Player Performance Manager; Academy/Reserves Coach
Scott Murrell	Reserves Head Coach
Chris Spurr	Academy Head Coach
Nathan Freer	Academy Head of Physical Performance
Toby Giddings	Academy Strength & Conditioning Coach
Richard Garbett	Scholarship Head Coach
Danny Lazenby	Scholarship Coach
Matteo Ghezzi	Scholarship Physiotherapist
James Metcalfe	Scholarship Strength & Conditioning Coach

=== Past coaches ===
- William Rhodes 1926–28
- Jim Bacon 1928–29
- Dick Silcock 1929–30
- Billy Clements 1930–32
- William Rhodes 1932–51
- Jack Kitching 1951–52
- William Rhodes 1952–53
- Ernest Ward 1953–56
- Len Garbett 1956–57
- William Rhodes 1957–58
- Harry Street 1958–64
- George Clinton 1964–66
- Derek Turner 1966–69
- "Tommy" Smales 1969–70
- Alan Hardisty 1970–71
- Harry Poole 1971–72
- John Sheridan 1972–73
- Dave Cox 1973–1974
- Mal Reilly 1974–87
- David Sampson 1987–88
- Darryl van der Velde 1988–93
- John Joyner 1993–97
- Mick Morgan 1997 (Caretaker)
- Stuart Raper 1997–2001
- Graham Steadman 2001–04
- Gary Mercer 2004
- Dave Woods 2005
- Terry Matterson 2006–11
- Ian Millward 2012–13
- Danny Orr 2013 (Caretaker)
- Daryl Powell 2013–21
- Lee Radford 2022–23
- Andy Last 2023
- Danny Ward 2023
- Craig Lingard 2024
- Danny McGuire 2025
- Chris Chester 2025 (Caretaker)
- Ryan Carr 2026

== Honours ==
=== Leagues ===
- Division 1 / Super League:

Runners up (3): 1938–39, 1968–69, 2017

League Leaders' Shield:

Winners (1): 2017

- Division 2 / Championship:

Winners (2): 2005, 2007

RFL Championship Leaders' Shield:

Winners (1): 2007
Runners up (1): 2005

- RFL Yorkshire League:

Winners (3): 1932–33, 1938–39, 1964–65

=== Cups ===
- Challenge Cup:

Winners (4): 1934–35 (also Cup Winners' Match), 1968–69, 1969–70, 1985–86
Runners up (3): 1991–92, 2014, 2021

- RFL Yorkshire Cup:

Winners (5): 1977–78, 1981–82, 1986–87, 1990–91, 1991–92
Runners up (8): 1948–49, 1950–51, 1968–69, 1971–72, 1983–84, 1985–86, 1987–88, 1988–89

- League Cup:

Winners (2): 1976–77, 1993–94

- BBC2 Floodlit Trophy:

Winners (4): 1965–66, 1966–67, 1967–68, 1976–77

== Records ==
=== Club records ===
Biggest win:

- Rochdale Hornets 0–106 Castleford Tigers, 9 September 2007

Heaviest defeat:

- Castleford Tigers 4–72 St Helens, 13 August 2006

Highest attendance:

- 25,449 – Castleford vs Hunslet, 9 March 1935

Highest attendance (Summer era):

- 11,702 – Castleford Tigers vs Leeds Rhinos, 7 March 2004

Highest attendance (Challenge Cup):

- 97,939 – Castleford vs Salford, 1969 Challenge Cup final (Wembley Stadium)

Highest attendance (vs an international touring team):

- 14,004 – Castleford vs Australia, 6 October 1948 (1948–49 Kangaroo Tour)

=== Player records ===
==== All-time records ====
Most tries in a game:

- 5 by Derek Foster (vs Hunslet), 10 November 1972
- 5 by John Joyner (vs Millom), 16 September 1973
- 5 by Steve Fenton (vs Dewsbury), 27 January 1978
- 5 by Ian French (vs Hunslet), 9 February 1986
- 5 by St. John Ellis (vs Whitehaven), 10 December 1989
- 5 by Greg Eden (vs Warrington Wolves), 11 June 2017

Most goals in a game:

- 17 by Sammy Lloyd (vs Millom), 16 September 1973

Most points in a game:

- 43 by Sammy Lloyd (vs Millom), 16 September 1973

Most tries in a season:

- 42 by Denny Solomona, 2016

Most goals in a season:

- 158 by Sammy Lloyd, 1976–77

Most points in a season:

- 355 by Luke Gale, 2017

Most career tries:

- 206 by Alan Hardisty, 1958–1971

Most career goals:

- 875 by Albert Lunn, 1951–1963

Most career points:

- 1,870 by Albert Lunn, 1951–1963

==== Most appearances ====
Rank	Apps	Player	Years
1	613	John Joyner	1972–1992
2	432	Dean Sampson	1987–2005
3	431	Arthur "Bruss" Atkinson	1926–1942
4	401	Alan Hardisty	1958–1971
5	388	Thomas L. Taylor	1931–1946
6	373	George Lewis	1929–1944
7	363	Albert Lunn	1952–1963
8	347	Michael Shenton	2004–2021
9	346	Keith England	1982–1994
10	344	Kenneth Pye	1950–1963

==== Super League records ====
Most tries in a game:

- 5 by Greg Eden (vs Warrington Wolves), 11 June 2017

Most goals in a game:

- 10 by Jamie Ellis (vs Huddersfield Giants), 8 July 2012

Most points in a game:

- 24 by Danny Orr (vs St Helens), 11 July 2003 – (3 tries, 6 goals)
- 24 by Kirk Dixon (vs Crusaders), 27 March 2011 – (2 tries, 8 goals)
- 24 by Jamie Ellis (vs Huddersfield Giants), 8 July 2012 – (1 try, 10 goals)
- 24 by Luke Gale (vs Leigh Centurions), 10 February 2017 – (2 tries, 8 goals)
- 24 by Luke Gale (vs Huddersfield Giants), 31 March 2017 – (3 tries, 6 goals)

Most tries in a season:

- 40 by Denny Solomona, 2016

Most goals in a season:

- 135 by Luke Gale, 2017

Most points in a season:

- 334 by Luke Gale, 2017

== Supporters ==
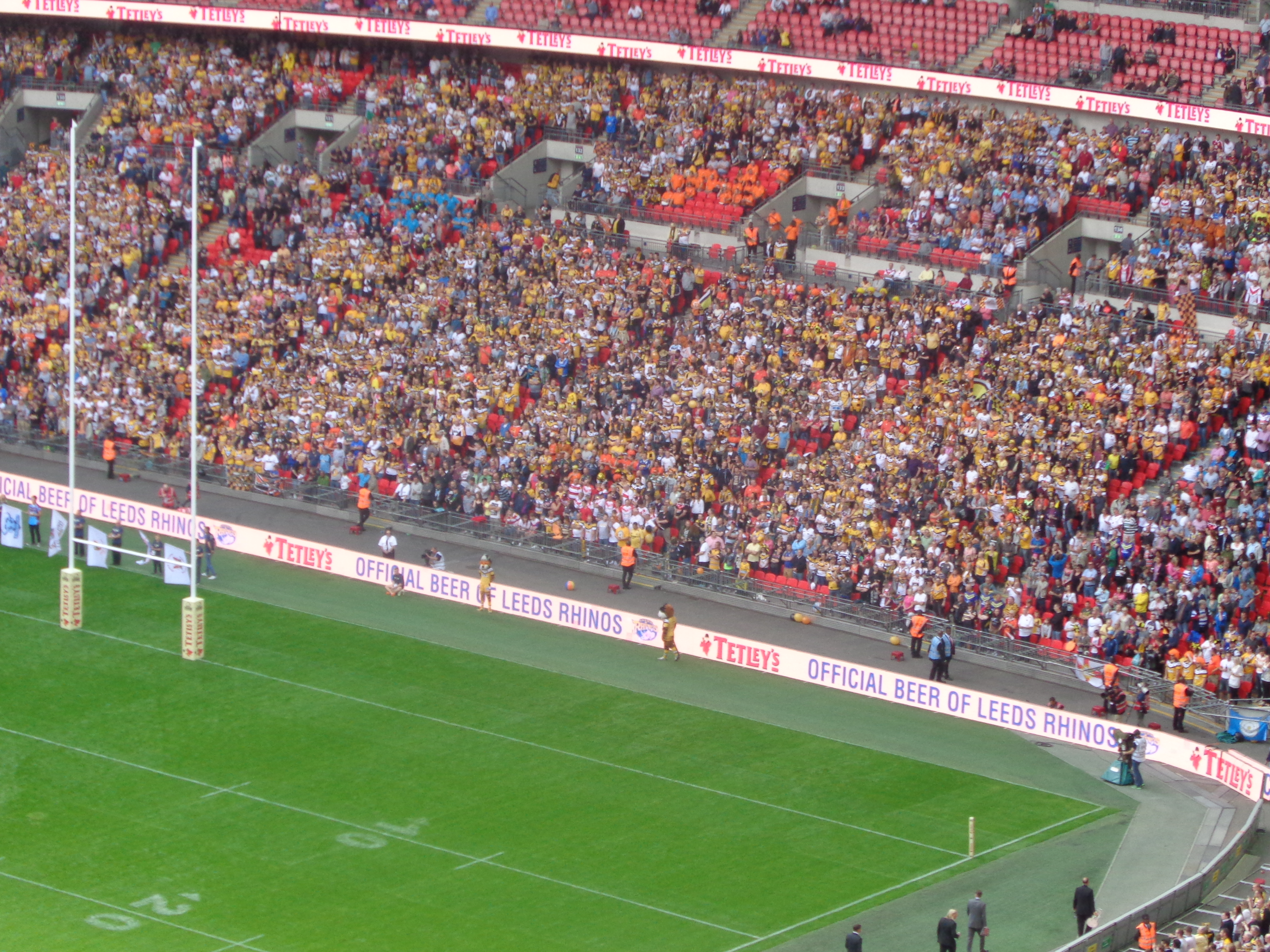
Castleford supporters at Wembley during the 2014 Challenge Cup final.

Castleford have had an average home attendance between 7,000 and 8,000 through the Super League era. The majority of the club's matchday support comes primarily from Castleford and the nearby towns of Normanton, Kippax, Knottingley, Rothwell, Garforth, Selby, Sherburn in Elmet, and Cross Gates.

While Castleford spent the 2005 and 2007 rugby league seasons in National League One due to relegation, the supporters maintained an average attendance above 5,000, enabling the club to retain a full-time squad. They broke attendance records in the second tier, including the Northern Rail Cup record of 9,400 for the 2005 final against Hull Kingston Rovers, and the Championship record attendance of 20,814 in the 2007 Grand Final against Widnes Vikings.

Among Castleford's fanbase are a number of notable supporters, including England international cricketers Chris Silverwood and Tim Bresnan, England international footballer Alan Smith, professional darts player Tom Sykes, Coronation Street actors Alan Halsall and Lucy-Jo Hudson, TV veterinary surgeon Julian Norton, United Kingdom Health Secretary Yvette Cooper, and broadcaster Ed Balls.

== Women's team ==
The Castleford Tigers Women's team was established in 2016. They took part in the inaugural season of the Women's Super League in 2017 and won the League Leaders' Shield in 2019. Castleford reached the final of the Women's Challenge Cup in 2018 and 2019 but lost to Leeds on both occasions.
