= Claughton =

Claughton may refer to:

== Places ==
=== United Kingdom ===
- Claughton, Lancaster
- Claughton, Wyre (also known as Claughton-on-Brock)
- Claughton, Merseyside
- Claughton (ward), an electoral ward of the Wirral Metropolitan Borough Council

=== United States ===
- Claughton Island, another name for Brickell Key, Miami, Florida

== Persons ==
- Sir Gilbert Claughton, 1st Baronet, chairman of the London and North Western Railway
- George Claughton, rugby league footballer of the 1970s and 1980s for Castleford
- Hugh Claughton, British cricketer
- John Alan Claughton, British cricketer
- Piers Calverley Claughton, British bishop
- Thomas Legh Claughton, British academic, poet and clergyman
- Thomas Claughton (MP) British MP
- Gruffydd Evans, Baron Evans of Claughton, British solicitor and politician

== Other ==
- LNWR Claughton Class, steam locomotives, named after Sir Gilbert Claughton
