= John Claughton =

John Claughton may refer to:

- John Alan Claughton (born 1956), English cricketer
- John Andrew Claughton (born 1978), English cricketer
