= Brumfitt =

Brumfitt is a surname. Notable people with the surname include:

- Jack Brumfitt (1917–1987), English first-class cricketer
- Paul Brumfitt (born 1956), English serial killer
- Taryn Brumfitt (born 1978), Australian writer and film director
