= Ilkley Upstagers' Theatre Group =

UK theatrical troupe

Upstagers' Theatre Group, or simply Upstagers, is an amateur youth theatre group based in Ilkley, West Yorkshire, England. Upstagers typically put on two main shows a year – a pantomime in late January and a musical theatre summer show in mid July. In addition to their Upstagers Theatre shows, Upstagers also run classes in Drama, Singing and Performance through their Upstagers Academy, which put on two showcase performances each year at Yeadon Town Hall.

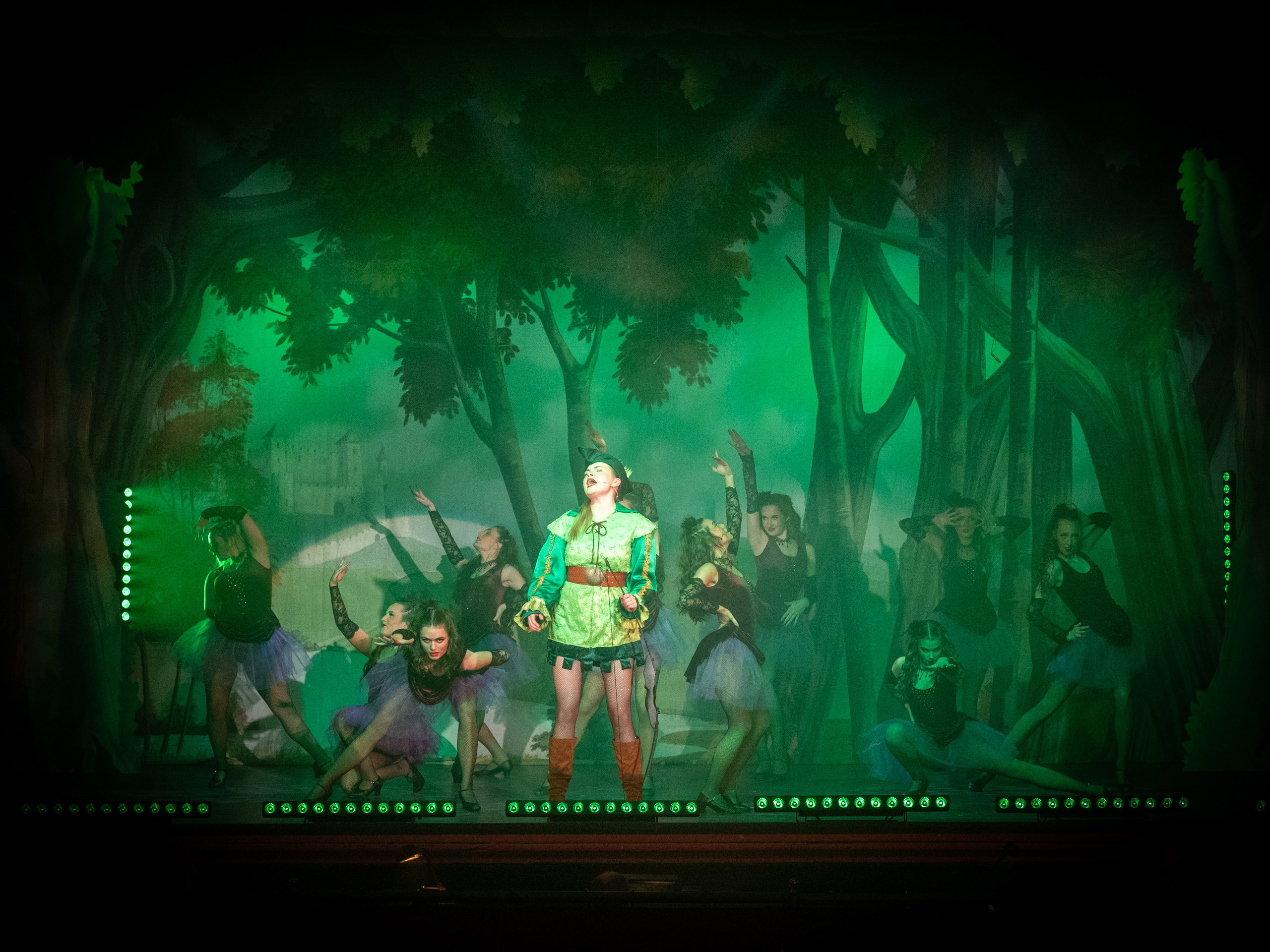
Upstagers 2024 pantomime

Rehearsing at The Barn

Upstagers perform primarily at Ilkley's King's Hall, though in the past they have also performed at the Bradford Alhambra, Tivoli Gardens and Guiseley Theatre. The group is a registered charity (no. 1041989) and received substantial National Lottery funding in the late 1990s to acquire a purpose-built headquarters. 'The Barn' comprises two dance studios, a set and materials workshop and a large wardrobe department.

== Reputation ==
Upstagers is renowned locally for producing energetic, spectacular musical theatre to large audiences and is generally regarded as one of the leading amateur groups in the region.

The company's reputation was recognised in 2006 by Sir Cameron Mackintosh, who hand-picked the group to be one of just 12 amateur companies in the UK to stage The Witches of Eastwick fresh from the West End. In 2011 Upstagers earned the opportunity to perform "Stars Look Down" from Billy Elliot the Musical as part of the Billy Youth Theatre at the Victoria Palace Theatre in the West End. They met and worked with the resident cast and creatives in doing so.

== Alumni ==
Upstagers performers have gone to study at leading drama and dance schools, including The Arts Educational Schools, Mountview Academy of Theatre Arts, Bird College and Guildford School of Acting, as well as entering the mainstream entertainment industry.
