= Terry Richardson (disambiguation) =

Terry Richardson (born 1965) is an American fashion and portrait photographer. Terry Richardson may also refer to:

- Terry Richardson (ice hockey) (born 1953), Canadian ice hockey player
- Terry Richardson (rugby league), English rugby league footballer
- Terry Richardson (American football) (born 1971), American football player
