= Guiseley =

Town in Leeds, West Yorkshire, England

Coordinates: 53.875°N 1.706°W

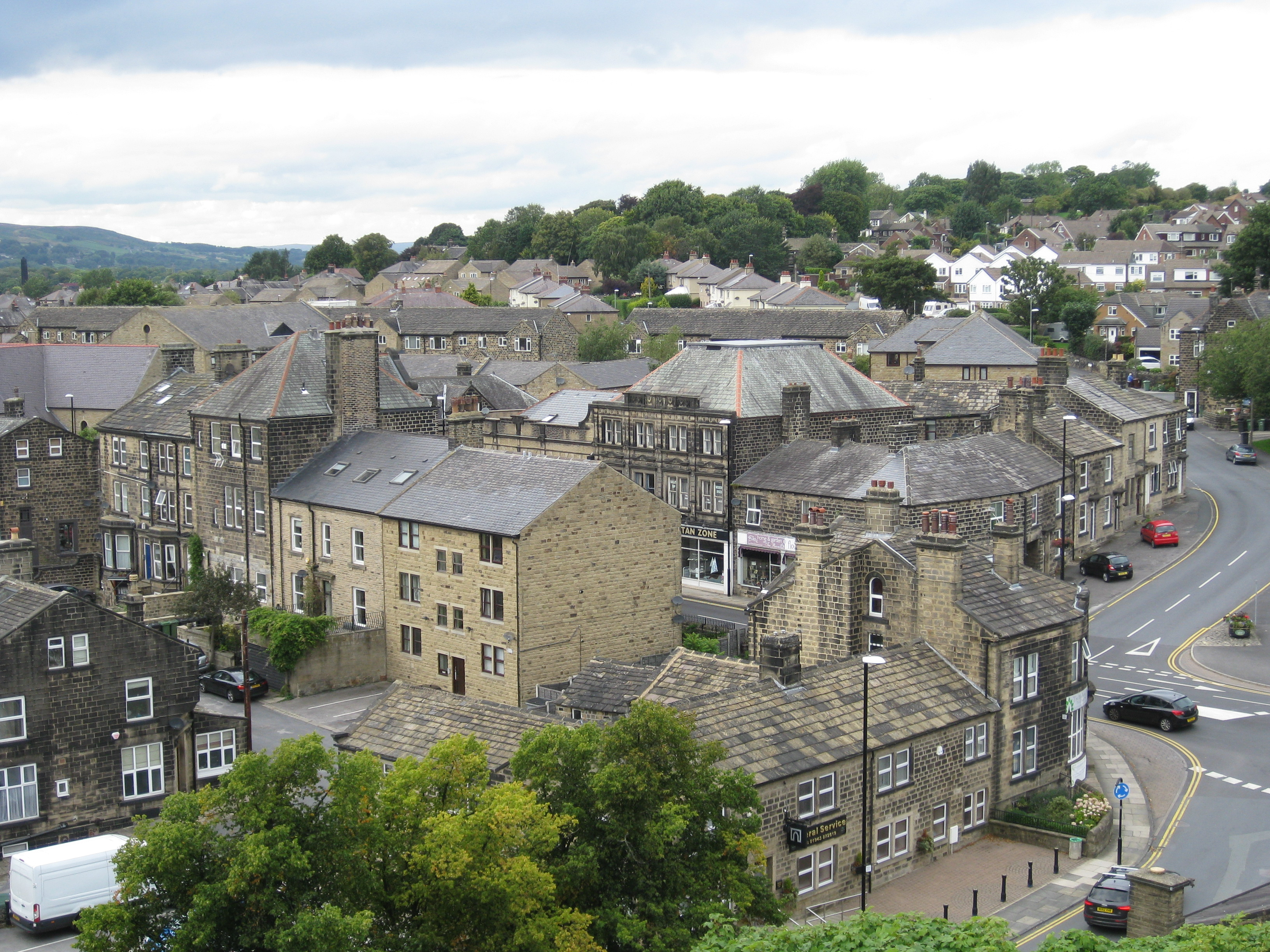
- A view of Guiseley from the tower of St Oswald's church

- Location within West Yorkshire
- Population: 22,347 (ward Guiseley and Rawdon. 2011)
- OS grid reference: SE193422
  - London: 175 mi (282 km) S
- Metropolitan borough: City of Leeds
- Metropolitan county: West Yorkshire
- Region: Yorkshire and the Humber
- Country: England
- Sovereign state: United Kingdom
- Post town: LEEDS
- Postcode district: LS20
- Dialling code: 01943
- Police: West Yorkshire
- Fire: West Yorkshire
- Ambulance: Yorkshire
- UK Parliament: Leeds North West

Guiseley (/ˈɡaɪzlɪ/ GHYZE-lee) is a small town in the City of Leeds, West Yorkshire, England. Historically part of the West Riding of Yorkshire, it is situated south of Otley and Menston and is now a north-western suburb of Leeds.

It sits in the Guiseley and Rawdon ward of Leeds City Council and the Leeds North West parliamentary constituency. At the 2001 census, Guiseley with Rawdon had a population of over 21,000, increasing to 22,347 at the 2011 census.

The A65 Otley Road, which passes through the town, is the main shopping street. Guiseley railway station has regular train services into Leeds, Bradford and Ilkley stations on the Wharfedale Line.

== Toponymy ==
The name of Guiseley is first attested in an eleventh-century copy of a charter from around 972, as Gislicleh; it next appears in the Domesday Book of 1086 as Gisele and similar variants. The early spelling suggests that the first element of the name is an Old English personal name Gīslic. No such name is otherwise attested, but it is a plausible nickname form of names beginning in Gīsl-, such as Gīslbeorht. The second element comes from the Old English word lēah ('open land in woodland'). Thus the name seems once to have meant 'Gīslic's clearing'.

The etymologies of local field- and street-names were studied in detail by Henry R. Daniels.

== History ==
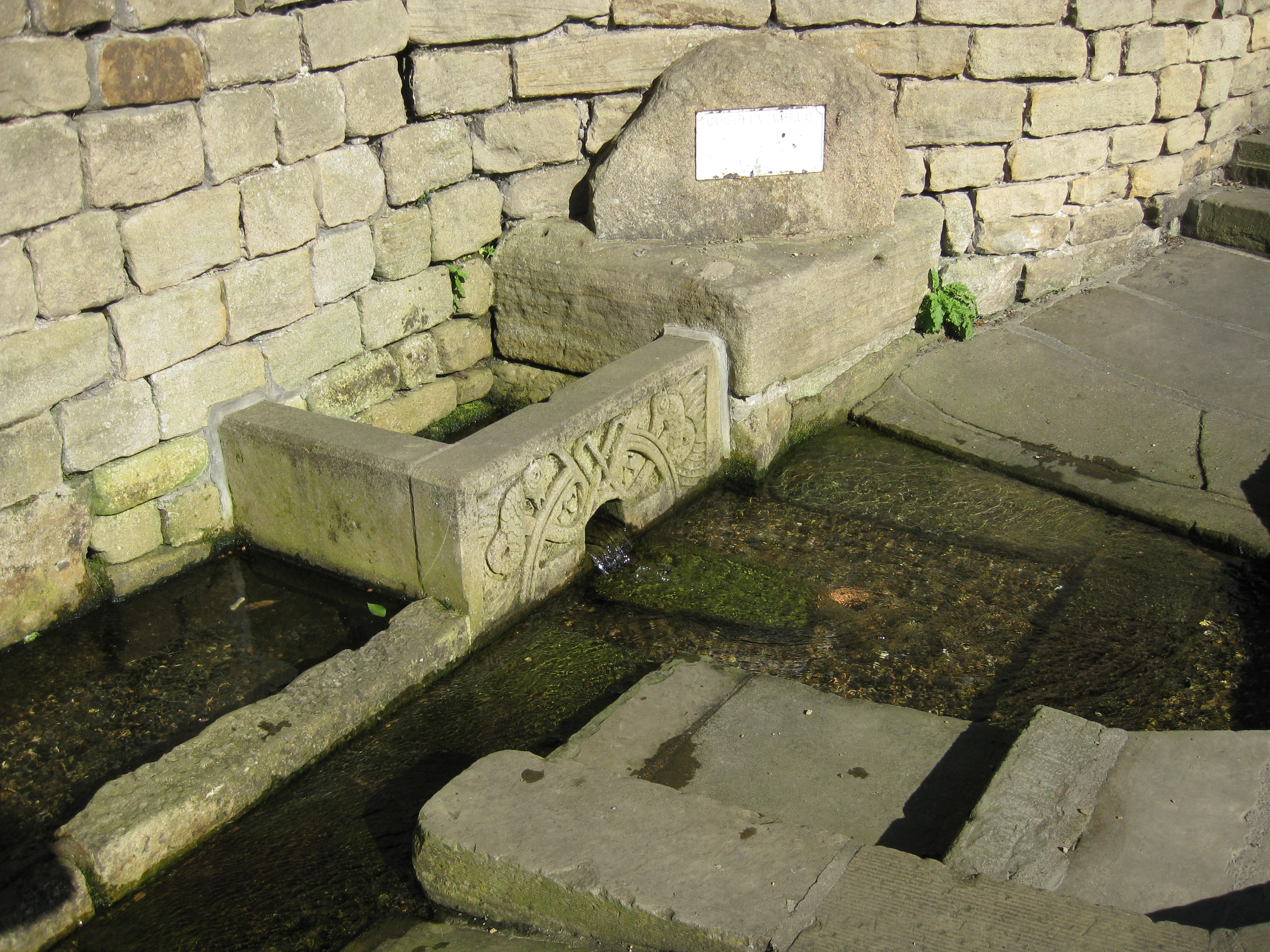
Guiseley Wells

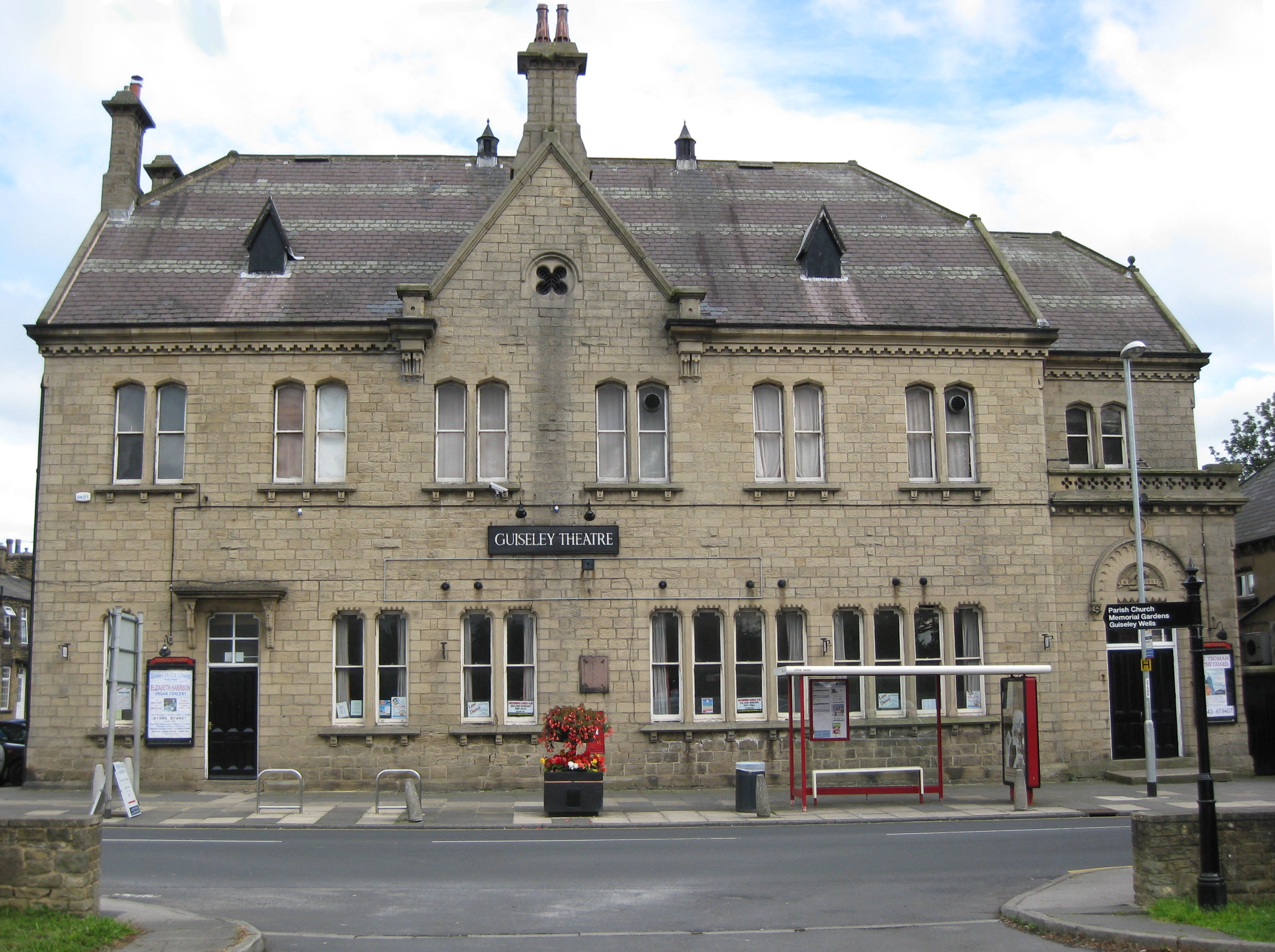
The former town hall (now Guiseley Theatre)

There have been Stone Age and Bronze Age finds in Guiseley and a Roman road, Road 72b, ran nearby on Guiseley Moor. An Anglo-Saxon settlement existed around a spring which is now called Guiseley Wells and provided drinking water.

It was a largely farming community until the 18th century, when cottage-based woollen industry arose. In Victorian times it became industrialised, acquiring a railway connection in 1865 and a town hall (now Guiseley Theatre) in 1867.

Guiseley was an ancient parish in the West Riding of Yorkshire from the 12th century. The parish also included the townships of Carlton, Horsforth, Rawdon and Yeadon, all of which became separate civil parishes in 1866. In 1894 Guiseley became an urban district, on 1 April 1937 the district was abolished to form Aireborough Urban District, part also went to Ilkley Urban District. On 1 April 1937 the parish was abolished to form Aireborough, part also went to Ilkley. In 1931 the parish had a population of 5,607. In 1974 Aireborough was itself abolished and absorbed into the City of Leeds Metropolitan District in the new county of West Yorkshire.

== Geography ==
Guiseley is situated in a hanging valley between Airedale and Wharfedale. The A65 road passes through, there is a railway station and Leeds Bradford Airport is nearby.

== Places of worship ==
Guiseley's church, dedicated to St Oswald, was the centre of a large parish that included many surrounding villages. It was used by generations of the Longfellow family. Henry Wadsworth Longfellow's 5th great-grandfather left here for the New World in the 17th century. The rector of St Oswald's for several decades was Rev. Robert More (died in 1642), the father-in-law of the English explorer, Captain Christopher Levett. Patrick Brontë and Maria Branwell were married at St Oswald's and became the parents of six children, including Anne, Branwell, Charlotte and Emily Brontë. St Oswald's is now part of a united parish with St Paul's Church in Esholt.

In addition to St Oswald's, there is also Guiseley Methodist Church and Guiseley Baptist Church, which was built in 1883 on Oxford Road in the old town, and the Kingdom Hall of Jehovah's Witnesses on Otley Road.

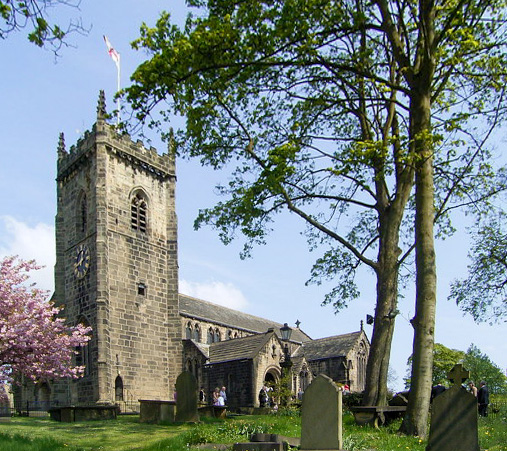
St Oswald's Church, Guiseley

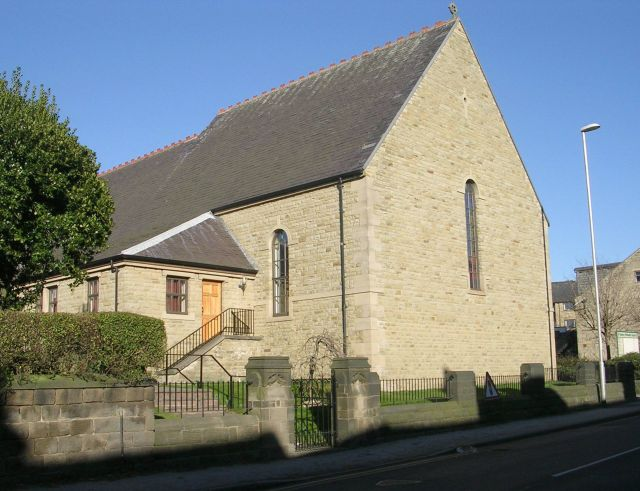
Guiseley Methodist Church

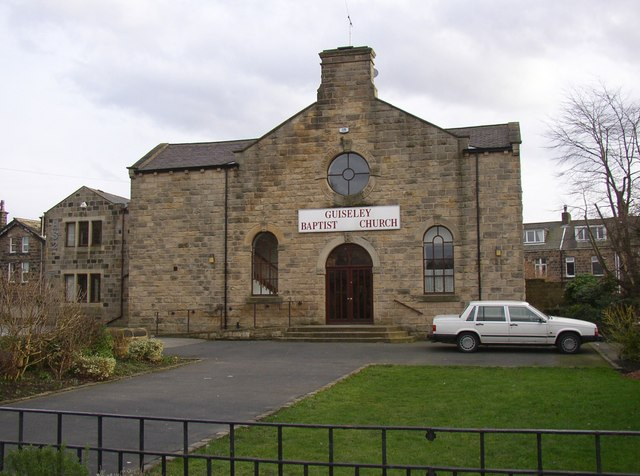
Guiseley Baptist Church

== Economy ==
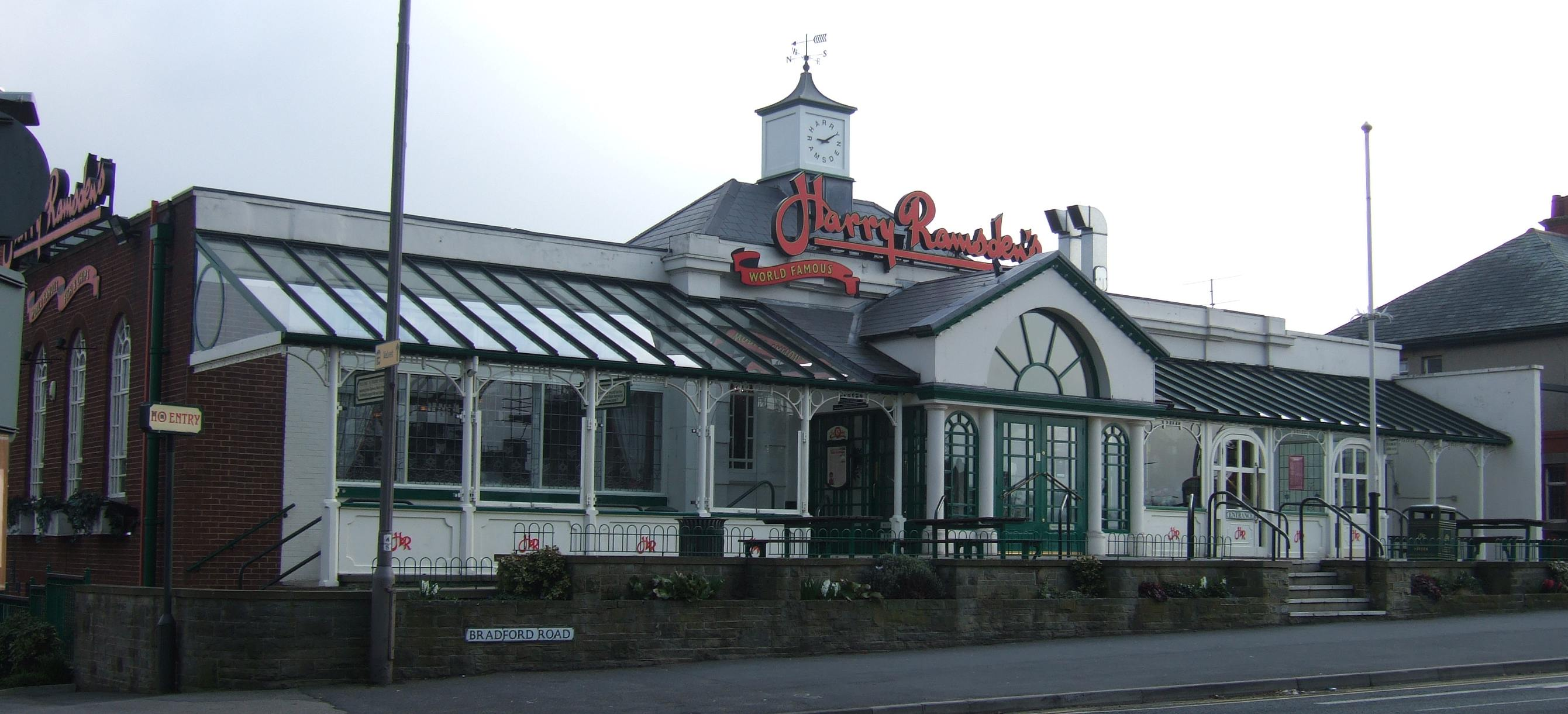
Harry Ramsden's

Crompton Parkinson was a major employer until its factory closed in 2004. The town was the home of Silver Cross, a pram manufacturer, whose factory was operational from 1936 to 2002.

The town is known for Harry Ramsden, whose fish and chip shop traded from a small shed next to the tram terminus at White Cross. In 1930 he opened "the world's biggest fish and chip shop". The original restaurant was closed in December 2011. The Wetherby Whaler group purchased the site and planned a £500,000 refurbishment to open during the summer of 2012.

Guiseley has two retail parks: Guiseley Retail Park in the centre of town, and Westside Retail Park between Guiseley and Yeadon. The town has a Morrisons supermarket, charity shops and beauty stores on Otley Road, as well as many pubs, bars, takeaways and restaurants located around the town and a leisure centre with a swimming pool and gym on The Green.

Many of the retail outlets in the town have been established on the converted sites of old factories or mills. Recently, an increasing number of well-known leading brands have stores in the town.

== Sports and recreation ==
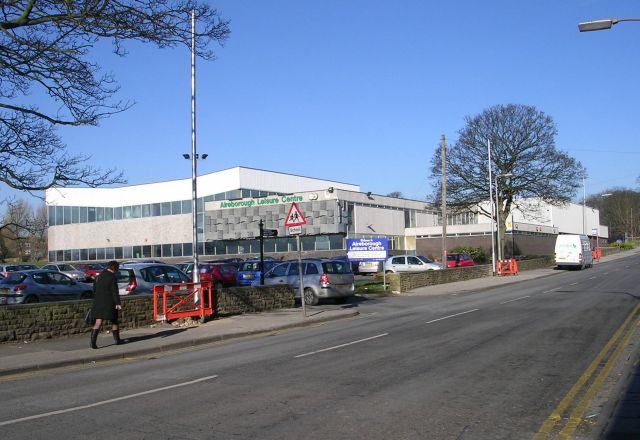
Aireborough Leisure Centre

Guiseley's professional football team, Guiseley A.F.C., play at Nethermoor Park. They played in the Conference North during the 2014–15 season, gaining promotion to the Conference Premier through the playoffs. Guiseley Cricket Club shares the club house and plays in the Airedale-Wharfedale Senior Cricket League. Aireborough RUFC play at Nunroyd Park. Local philanthropist Jonathan Peate gave Nethermoor Park (Guiseley) and Nunroyd Park (between Yeadon and Guiseley) to local people in the early 20th century. Two other parks were regenerated in 2011/12, Springfield Road and Parkinson's Park. Parkinson's Park was given to Guiseley in the 1930s by Frank and Albert Parkinson. By 2002 it had become a wasteland with frequent occurrences of antisocial behaviour. It is now owned by Bellway Homes.

Guiseley is also home to England Athletics registered running club Airecentre Pacers.

== Media ==
Local news and television programmes are provided by BBC Yorkshire and ITV Yorkshire. Television signals are received from the Emley Moor TV transmitter. Local radio stations are BBC Radio Leeds, Heart Yorkshire, Capital Yorkshire, Hits Radio West Yorkshire, and Greatest Hits Radio West Yorkshire. The town is served by the local newspapers, Gazette & Observer and Telegraph & Argus.

== Schools ==
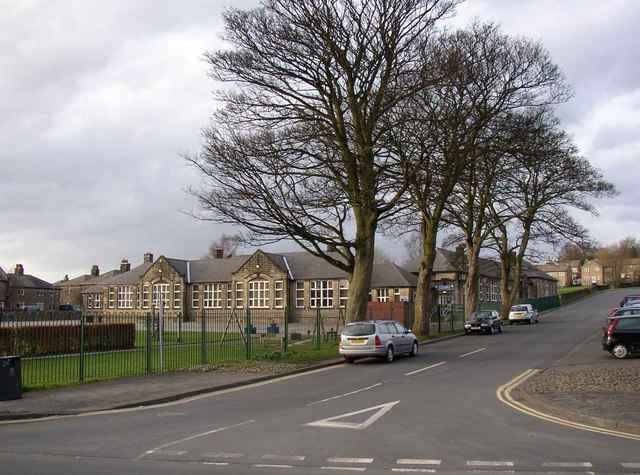
Guiseley Primary School on Oxford Road

Guiseley School on Fieldhead Road was built as a secondary modern in the 1960s and is sometimes known as Fieldhead School. Aireborough Grammar School opened in 1910 and closed in 1991.

Primary schools include Tranmere Park School and St. Oswald's C of E School.

== Notable people ==
=== General ===
- Ann Ellis (1843–1919), leader of the 1875 weavers strike in west Yorkshire
- Walter Fawkes, writer, member of parliament
- Frank Parkinson, notable electrical engineer
- Andy Haldane, chief economist at the Bank of England

=== Sports ===
- Jack Brumfitt, English first-class cricketer
- Hugh Claughton, English first-class cricketer
- John Alan Claughton, English first-class cricketer
- Peter Pullan, English first-class cricketer
- Jack van Geloven, English first-class Cricketer
- Josh Windass, English footballer

=== Entertainment ===
- Burt Rhodes, music director
- Harry Corbett, puppeteer of the character Sooty, lived with his parents in the town
- Matthew Corbett, entertainer
- Tasmin Archer, co-wrote the song "Sleeping Satellite"
- Craig McKay, actor
- Glenda McKay, actor
- Belinda O’Hooley, singer-songwriter and pianist
- Peter Grant, jazz singer
- Bob Stanley of Saint Etienne

== See also ==
- Listed buildings in Guiseley and Rawdon
