= 1981–82 Yorkshire Cup =

- Structure: Regional knockout championship
- Teams: 16
- Winners: Castleford
- Runners-up: Bradford Northern

The 1981–82 Yorkshire Cup was the 74th occasion on which the Yorkshire Cup competition had been held.

Castleford won the trophy by beating Bradford Northern by the score of 10–5

The match was played at Headingley, Leeds, now in West Yorkshire. The attendance was 5,852 and receipts were £10,359.

1981 was the start of a successful eleven year run for Castleford, previously only winners in 1977, they made eight appearances in the Yorkshire Cup final, winning four and ending as runner-up in four occasions.

It is also the first of two successive years when Bradford Northern played in the Yorkshire Cup final, and in both cases they ended as runner-up.

== Background ==
This season there were no junior/amateur clubs taking part, no new entrants and no "leavers" and so the total of entries remained the same at sixteen.

This in turn resulted in no byes in the first round.

== Competition and results ==
=== Round 1 ===
Involved 8 matches (with no byes) and 16 clubs

Game No	Fixture Date	Home team	Score	Away team	Venue	Att	Rec	Notes	Ref
1	Fri 14 Aug 1981	Hull Kingston Rovers	34–7	Huddersfield	Craven Park (1)	7030			
2	Sun 16 Aug 1981	Castleford	18–16	Featherstone Rovers	Wheldon Road	3092			
3	Sun 16 Aug 1981	Doncaster	11–12	Batley	Bentley Road Stadium/Tattersfield	443			
4	Sun 16 Aug 1981	Halifax	5–33	Bradford Northern	Thrum Hall	4164			
5	Sun 16 Aug 1981	Hull F.C.	16–19	Leeds	Boulevard	11194			
6	Sun 16 Aug 1981	Keighley	23–13	Bramley	Lawkholme Lane	1003			
7	Sun 16 Aug 1981	Wakefield Trinity	18–6	Dewsbury	Belle Vue	2817			
8	Sun 16 Aug 1981	York	26–11	Hunslet	Clarence Street	3000			

=== Round 2 – quarterfinals ===
Involved 4 matches and 8 clubs

Game No	Fixture Date	Home team	Score	Away team	Venue	Att	Rec	Notes	Ref
1	Sun 23 Aug 1981	Castleford	42–30	York	Wheldon Road	3453			
2	Sun 23 Aug 1981	Hull Kingston Rovers	22–12	Wakefield Trinity	Craven Park (1)	8907			
3	Sun 23 Aug 1981	Keighley	12–28	Batley	Lawkholme Lane	1374			
4	Sun 23 Aug 1981	Leeds	5–11	Bradford Northern	Headingley	7526			

=== Round 3 – semifinals ===
Involved 2 matches and 4 clubs

Game No	Fixture Date	Home team	Score	Away team	Venue	Att	Rec	Notes	Ref
1	Wed 2 Sep 1981	Castleford	40–3	Batley	Wheldon Road	3014			
2	Wed 2 Sep 1981	Hull Kingston Rovers	11–12	Bradford Northern	Craven Park (1)	9878			

=== Final ===
Game No	Fixture Date	Home team	Score	Away team	Venue	Att	Rec	Notes	Ref
	Saturday 3 October 1981	Castleford	10–5	Bradford Northern	Headingley	5,852	£10,359	(Note: The attendance is given as 5,876 by RUGBYLEAGUEproject but the Rothmans Rugby League Yearbook of 1982–83 gives the attendance as twenty-four less at 5,852) (Note: Headingley, Leeds, is the home ground of Leeds RLFC with a capacity of 21,000. The record attendance was 40,175 for a league match between Leeds and Bradford Northern on 21 May 1947.)	

==== Teams and scorers ====
Castleford	No.	Bradford Northern
	Teams	
George Claughton	1	Keith Mumby
Terry Richardson	2	David Barends
Steve Fenton	3	Gary Hale
Gary Hyde	4	Alan Parker
Geoff Morris	5	Les Gant
John Joyner (c)	6	Ellery Hanley
Bob Beardmore	7	Alan Redfearn (c)
Alan Hardy	8	Jeff Grayshon
Bob Spurr	9	Brian Noble
Barry Johnson	10	Phil Sanderson
David Finch	11	Gary Van Bellen
Kevin Ward	12	Graham Idle
Andrew Timson	13	Alan Rathbone
	Subs	
Ian Birkby	14	David Redfearn (for Phil Sanderson)
Paul Norton (for Alan Hardy)	15	Dick Jasiewicz (for Gary Van Bellan)
Mal Reilly	Coach	Peter Fox
10	score	5
5	HT	2
	Scorers	
	Tries	
Gary Hyde (1)	T	Alan Parker (1)
John Joyner (1)	T	
	Goals	
David Finch (2)	G	Ellery Hanley (1)
Referee		Robin Whitfield (Widnes)
White Rose Trophy for Man of the match		Barry Johnson – Castleford – Prop
sponsored by		
Competition Sponsor		Webster's Brewery (Samuel Webster & Sons Ltd)

Scoring – Try = three points – Goal = two points – Drop goal = one point

=== The road to success ===
First round
Castleford	18
Featherstone Rovers	16
York	26
Hunslet	11
Keighley	23
Bramley	13
Doncaster	11
Batley	12
Hull Kingston Rovers	34
Huddersfield	7
Wakefield Trinity	18
Dewsbury	6
Hull F.C.	16
Leeds	19
Halifax	5
Bradford Northern	33

Second round
Castleford	42
York	30
Keighley	12
Batley	28
Hull Kingston Rovers	22
Wakefield Trinity	12
Leeds	5
Bradford Northern	11

Semi-finals
Castleford	40
Batley	3
Hull Kingston Rovers	11
Bradford Northern	12

Final
Castleford	10
Bradford Northern	5

== See also ==
- 1981–82 Rugby Football League season
- Rugby league county cups
