= Tom Claughton =

English cricketer (born 1996)

Personal information
- Full name: Thomas Hugh Claughton
- Born: 24 January 1996 (age 30); Slough, Berkshire, England
- Batting: Right-handed
- Bowling: Right-arm off-break
- Role: Wicket-keeper
- Relatives: John Claughton senior (father); John Claughton junior (cousin)

Domestic team information
- Years: Team
- 2015–2019: Oxford University

Career statistics
Competition	First-class
Matches	3
Runs scored	58
Batting average	14.50
100s/50s	–/–
Top score	29
Balls bowled	60
Wickets	1
Bowling average	27.00
5 wickets in innings	–
10 wickets in match	–
Best bowling	1/16
Catches/stumpings	7/1
- Source: Cricinfo, 23 February 2020

Thomas Hugh Claughton (born 24 January 1996) is an English former first-class cricketer.

The son of the cricketer John Claughton, he was born at Slough in January 1996. He was educated at King Edward's School, Birmingham before going up to Magdalen College, Oxford. While studying at Oxford, he played first-class cricket on three occasions for Oxford University between 2015–19, with all three appearances coming against Cambridge University in The University Match. He scored 58 runs in these matches, with a high score of 29. His cousin, John junior, also played first-class cricket.
