= David Finch (rugby league) =

English rugby league footballer

Playing information
- Position: Wing, Centre, Second-row, Loose forward
Club
Years	Team	Pld	T	G	FG	P
1978–85	Castleford	106	46	117	0	364
1985–86	Oldham	3
	Total	109	46	117	0	364

David Finch is a former professional rugby league footballer who played in the 1970s and 1980s. He played at club level for Castleford and Oldham, as a wing, centre, second-row, or loose forward.

== Playing career ==
=== County Cup Final appearances ===
David Finch played at second-row, and scored two goals in Castleford's 10-5 victory over Bradford Northern in the 1981 Yorkshire Cup Final during the 1981–82 season at Headingley, Leeds, on Saturday 3 October 1981.
