= Andrew Timson =

English rugby league footballer

Personal information
- Born: 13 April 1961 (age 63); Pontefract, West Riding of Yorkshire, England

Playing information
- Position: Second-row, Loose forward
Club
Years	Team	Pld	T	G	FG	P
1979–85	Castleford	98	28	0	0	86
1985	Doncaster
1985–86	Rochdale Hornets
1986–88	Doncaster
	York
	Bramley
	Total	98	28	0	0	86
Representative
Years	Team	Pld	T	G	FG	P
1982	Great Britain U24	2	1	0	0	3

Andrew Timson (born 13 April 1961) is an English former professional rugby league footballer who played in the 1970s and 1980s. He played at club level for Castleford, Doncaster, Rochdale Hornets, York and Bramley as a second-row, or loose forward.

== Playing career ==
=== Castleford ===
Timson played loose forward in Castleford's 10–5 victory over Bradford Northern in the 1981 Yorkshire Cup Final during the 1981–82 season at Headingley, Leeds, on Saturday 3 October 1981, and played at second-row in the 2–13 defeat by Hull F.C. in the 1983 Yorkshire Cup Final during the 1983–84 season at Elland Road, Leeds, on Saturday 15 October 1983.

Timson was loaned out to Doncaster during the 1984–85 season.

=== Later career ===
Timson was signed by Rochdale Hornets in August 1985 for a fee of £10,000, but announced his retirement in January 1986 after suffering a series of shoulder injuries during the season. He decided to return to the club three months later, but was transfer listed, and eventually sold to Doncaster.

In January 1988, Timson was sold to York for a fee of £5,000. He also played for Bramley towards the end of his career.

=== Representative career ===
Timson played twice for Great Britain under-24's against France in 1982.
