= National Numeracy =

UK charitable organization

- Founded: 2012
- Founded at: Lewes, United Kingdom
- Type: Non-governmental organization
- Purpose: Numeracy; Education; Adult numeracy
- Region served: Nationwide
- Chair: Perdita Fraser
- CEO: Sam Sims
- Website: www.nationalnumeracy.org.uk

National Numeracy is an independent charity (registered no. 1145669 in England and Wales) based in Brighton, UK, that promotes the importance of numeracy and "everyday maths".

The charity was founded in 2012; its chair is Perdita Fraser and vice chair Andy Haldane. Its current chief executive is Sam Sims, who replaced Mike Ellicock in 2020.

The charity aims to challenge negative attitudes towards maths and promotes effective approaches to improving functional numeracy skills. Chris Humphries, former chair of National Numeracy and a former chief executive of the UK Commission for Employment and Skills, said: "It is simply inexcusable for anyone to say: 'I can't do maths.' It is a peculiarly British disease which we aim to eradicate." The charity's Theory of Change is detailed on their website.

National Numeracy has been critical of the UK mathematics curriculum, claiming that it is flawed and requires radical improvement to ensure that everyone leaves compulsory education with essential numeracy skills.

National Numeracy is supported by a number of celebrities, including Rachel Riley, financial journalist Martin Lewis of Money Saving Expert, author, television presenter and mathematics teacher Bobby Seagull, financial writer Iona Bain, Strictly Come Dancing's Katya Jones, Great British Bake Off 2020 winner Peter Sawkins, and the poet and comedian Harry Baker. It is also supported by organisations, including TP ICAP, KPMG, Experian, Ufi VocTech Trust, Garfield Weston Foundation and the Edge Foundation.

== History of National Numeracy ==
A 2010 report commissioned by Lord Moser from New Philanthropy Capital recommended the creation of a national numeracy trust. The report, which focused on low levels of numeracy in the UK, showed how charities and funders can help people to be confidently numerate. These problems are a focus of National Numeracy's strategy. National Numeracy was legally registered as a charity in January 2012 with the press launch of the charity in March 2012.

== Work and campaigns ==
On 30 October 2014 National Numeracy CEO Mike Ellicock was featured on an edition of ITV's Tonight documentary programme The Trouble With Numbers. Mike Ellicock spoke about cultural and attitudinal problems preventing people from succeeding in maths.

In 2014, National Numeracy launched the National Numeracy Challenge, a free online tool which allows users to assess their numeracy level and access resources to help them improve. By December 2020, 340,000 people had registered on the National Numeracy Challenge.

During the 2014-15 FA Cup season, BBC Sport and BBC Learning worked with National Numeracy on Maths of the Day, a series of films shown across the BBC, as well as accompanying content on the BBC iWonder website, exploring maths in football. The films featured former footballer and commentator Robbie Savage and Countdown co-host Rachel Riley among others. In March 2015, there was also a Maths of the Day live event on BBC Radio 5 Live in which National Numeracy's Mike Ellicock and Rachel Riley talked about the importance of maths skills. It also included a feature from A Question of Sport in which team captains Phil Tufnell and Matt Dawson took part in a sport-related maths quiz with the audience, which was also made available on the BBC Radio 5 Live website.

In February 2015, National Numeracy made a complaint on Twitter about a L'Oreal Paris print advertising campaign, featuring Oscar-winning actress Helen Mirren, which included the tagline "Age is just a number and maths was never my thing". L'Oreal responded to the complaint, tweeting in reply "Thanks for raising this, we hadn't meant it to be interpreted this way. We're changing it right away and you'll see new ads soon." Speaking to BBC News about the change, National Numeracy's Mike Ellicock said "Throwaway remarks about being 'no good at maths' are so easy to make and so damaging in the way they normalise negative attitudes. It's unusual for a company to recognise and remedy their error in the way that L'Oreal have, so we really appreciate their response."

In 2017, the National Numeracy Challenge incorporated a series of resources to help people build their confidence and a positive attitude towards numbers.

National Numeracy Day 2026 will take place on 20 May for the ninth year running. This annual campaign celebrates numbers and how they are used in everyday life. The first National Numeracy Day launched 16 May 2018. The founding supporter was KPMG and the Day was covered widely in the media.

In 2020 National Numeracy launched the first Number Confidence Week to focus on the role of attitudes and confidence as barriers to using numbers in daily life. In 2024 Number Confidence Week took place 4–8 November.

== Research ==
National Numeracy commissions and conducts research to inform its project work.

2012: According to the most recent Skills for Life survey, almost 78% of people in England have numeracy skills well below A*-C grade at GCSE.

2013: OECD found England to be 21 out of 24 countries in numeracy, ages 16–24. The large study also showed that 8.5 million adults in England and Northern Ireland have the numeracy levels of a 10-year-old.

2013: Employers report increasing difficulties in finding potential employees with the desired numeracy skills. In 2011, 24% reported applicants for new jobs had poor numeracy, in the past year it has risen to 26%. Employers also report numeracy skill gaps among their existing workforce.

2014: Report on the causes and consequences of poor English and maths skills, including 55% of homeless people found to lack basic math skills (D-G at GCSE).

2014: National Numeracy-commissioned research by Pro Bono Economics found that over the course of a year, the cost of low levels of numeracy is estimated to be around £20.2 billion which is roughly 1.3 per cent of GDP to the total UK economy. This cost is distributed between individuals (£8.8 billion), employers (£3.2 billion) and government (£8.2 billion). This does not include costs of the higher risk of unemployment and underemployment to individuals and firms, and excludes wider costs to health, well-being, public services.

2016: The Mayor's Fund and National Numeracy published "The Parent Factor", which showed that parental engagement in school maths leads to higher attainment and better classroom participation among pupils.

2018: National Numeracy was funded by the Money Advice Service's What Works Fund to conduct research about the connection between good numeracy and financial capability. The report found that the higher an adult's level of numeracy, the better their financial capability mindset was likely to be.

Since 2012, National Numeracy has commissioned an annual YouGov survey into British public attitudes to maths to find out why people are motivated to improve their numeracy. The 2015 survey found that most people wanted to improve their numeracy to enable better understanding of their personal finances.

== National Numeracy’s aim & projects ==
=== Aim ===
National Numeracy cites its aim as "to enable everyone across the UK to be confident and competent in using numbers and data, to be able to make good decisions in their daily life and at work.". This is approached in three main ways:

- By raising awareness about poor numeracy levels which exist in the UK, how numeracy differs from mathematics, and promoting the recognition that everyone can improve through campaigns such as National Numeracy Day.
- By improving numeracy with the National Numeracy Challenge, a tool for users to assess and improve on their numeracy at their own pace.
- By improving communication of numbers and data by helping organisations to use a ‘Plain Numbers’ approach, so that anyone can understand their information regardless of their numeracy level.

=== Projects ===
- The National Numeracy Challenge is a free interactive web-based tool that aims to improve numeracy skills among the adult population of the UK. The assessment tool asks participants to complete a series of everyday maths questions at various levels of difficulty, then revealing the level of maths skill they currently have and a score out of 100. Participants are then given a target for improvement and access to free resources to learn in the areas they need to work on, encouraging them to come back and take the assessment again to see how they have improved. In October 2015, the Challenge website was updated to include the ability to see which questions were answered incorrectly. In 2017, a series of attitudinal resources were incorporated into the National Numeracy Challenge, to help users build their confidence with numbers and maths.
- The Numeracy Review is for employers who want to have in-depth insights into numeracy levels and attitudes to maths among their workforce. The process assesses the state of numeracy in a workplace, both in terms of maths ability and mindset among staff, using attitudinal surveys and the Challenge Online, then working with employers to address any areas that need improvement.
- Challenge Champions are numeracy advocates who are based within workplaces and other settings to support colleagues in improving their numeracy and using the Challenge Online.
- The Family Maths Toolkit is a project designed to engage parents and families with maths learning for children aged 13 and under, encouraging them to support their learning in the home with everyday maths activities provided by National Numeracy through schools. The project was piloted as the Parent Toolkit with 10 school across the UK in 2014–15 to find out how parental engagement with children's maths learning improved their attainment in school. The website was relaunched in September 2015 as the Family Maths Toolkit.
- Passport Maths is an early intervention programme for year 7 secondary school pupils who need extra support in mathematics, helping them to progress from level 3 maths to level 4 and attain better outcomes at GCSE.
- Star Dash Studios is a free smartphone game for young adults, helping them to see everyday maths in vocational settings. It is currently available for Android and Apple mobile phones.
- Train the Trainer is a workshop for organisations to give their staff the confidence to deliver numeracy training in the workplace.
- Department for Education project. In 2018, National Numeracy made a successful bid to the Department for Education Flexible Learning Fund. The charity is working with six partners including the John Lewis Partnership and Civil Service Learning to deliver basic numeracy skills via an online delivery method.
