= Geoff Morris (rugby league) =

English rugby league footballer

Personal information
- Full name: Geoffrey Morris

Playing information
- Position: Fullback, Left wing, Centre, Stand-off
Club
Years	Team	Pld	T	G	FG	P
1974–82	Castleford	95	12	0	0	36
≤1984–≥85	Rochdale Hornets
≤1985–≥87	Doncaster RLFC
	Total	95	12	0	0	36

Coaching information
Club
Years	Team	Gms	W	D	L	W%
1992	Doncaster RLFC

Geoffrey "Geoff" Morris is an English professional rugby league footballer who played in the 1970s and 1980s. He played at club level for Castleford, Rochdale Hornets, and Doncaster.

Geoff Morris played on the wing in Castleford's 10-5 victory over Bradford Northern in the 1981 Yorkshire Cup Final during the 1981–82 season at Headingley, Leeds, on Saturday 3 October 1981.
