= Alan Hardy (rugby league) =

English rugby league footballer

Playing information
- Position: Prop, Second-row, Loose forward, Hooker
Club
Years	Team	Pld	T	G	FG	P
1974–84	Castleford	112	4	0	6	18

Alan Hardy is a former professional rugby league footballer who played in the 1970s and 1980s. He played at club level for Castleford, as a loose forward, prop, hooker, or second-row.

== Playing career ==
=== County Cup Final appearances ===
Alan Hardy played at prop (replaced by substitute Paul Norton) in Castleford's 10-5 victory over Bradford Northern in the 1981 Yorkshire Cup Final during the 1981–82 season at Headingley, Leeds, on Saturday 3 October 1981.
