= Guiseley School =

Foundation school in Guiseley, West Yorkshire, England

Location
- Fieldhead Road; Guiseley; City of Leeds, West Yorkshire, LS20 8DT; England; 53.8715°N 1.7178°W

Information
- Type: Foundation school
- Motto: A Thinking School (former)
- Established: 1963
- Local authority: Leeds City Council
- Department for Education URN: 108085 Tables
- Ofsted: Reports
- Headteacher: Paul Clayton
- Gender: Mixed
- Age: 11 to 18
- Enrolment: 1344
- Capacity: 1450
- Houses: Sigma; Delta; Omega; Gamma
- Colours: Gold; Navy; Light Blue
- Website: http://www.guiseleyschool.org.uk/

Guiseley School is a mixed secondary school and sixth form located in Guiseley, West Yorkshire, England. The school offers GCSEs and BTECs as programmes of study for pupils, while students in the Sixth Form have the option to study from a range of A-levels and further BTECs.

Guiseley School was established in 1963 on Fieldhead Road, Guiseley, with a main building nicknamed the ‘Tower Block’ and many outbuildings. An extension known as the ‘Sixth Form Block’ was added in 1994 and the grounds were rebuilt from the ground up in 2023.

== History ==
=== Early years and founding ===
The school's history predates the 1960s as Guiseley Secondary Modern. This was located upon Oxford Road in the centre of Guiseley and is now site to Guiseley Primary School. During the early 1960s a larger site was found and new buildings constructed for the secondary school. By 1963, the site had been completed and the new school was officially opened on 20 July 1963. The first cohort of students enrolled in September 1963.

=== 1990–2015 ===
In 1996, the school was awarded Technology College status, which awards schools which specialise in maths, science and design and technology. This ended in 2014.

In September 2006, the school was damaged by a tornado and floods during a freak storm and had to be temporarily closed.

In September 2011, Guiseley School became one of the first schools in the UK to completely ban skirts as part of their school uniform. The school released a statement saying that they believed that short skirts were contributing to the sexualisation of children. With a new uniform introduced in 2019, this ban has since been revoked.

In January 2014, Guiseley became a Foundation School administered by Leeds City Council and the Aireborough Learning Partnership.

In September 2015, 46 pupils and 4 staff members from the school became ill with food poisoning while on a school trip to Belgium. A total of 80 Year 11 pupils had gone on the school trip and those who were taken ill were treated at seven hospitals around Zeebrugge. Those pupils who were not infected were taken to a hostel. All of the pupils and staff eventually recovered.

=== 2015–present ===
In January 2019, plans to replace most of the existing school buildings with a new development were approved. The plans were expected to be completed in February 2021. By June 2023, the majority of the old school grounds had been demolished and replaced with newer, more-up-to-date buildings and facilities. These include a new sports hall, auditorium and peripatetic music classrooms and were opened at that year's school run.

In March 2020, Department for Education statistics revealed that Guiseley School received the lowest amount of funding per pupil of all Leeds state secondary schools, with £4,673 per head, although this figure was still above the national average of £4,556 per pupil for all state schools in England.

In 2024, Guiseley School started fundraising for a new all-weather '3G' pitch at the 2024 school run. The pitch was completed in 2025 and started being used in the 2025–26 academic year.

== Academic performance ==
In October 2009, the school was awarded the International School Award from the British Council for its outstanding development of international dimension.

In July 2012, the school was awarded the Artsmark Gold Award from the Arts Council of England. In November 2017, the school was awarded the Artsmark Award Platinum. It was one of only twelve schools across the UK to achieve this ranking. The school achieved the Platinum Artsmark Award again in September 2022.

In March 2021, the school was awarded as a Shakespeare School Festival Gold School in recognition of it "developing and embedding personal and transferable skills through the arts and encouraging community engagement".

In September 2023, the school was awarded the Secondary Geography Quality Mark from the Geographical Association. It was one of only twelve schools across the country to achieve the award.

== Facilities ==
Guiseley School's grounds currently contain 4 blocks, named Albion, Springhead, Moons and Shires after famous mills in the surrounding area of Aireborough. There is also a school field used for PE lessons and the annual school run.

Before 2023, Guiseley School’s grounds contained the Moons Building (then known as the ‘Sixth Form Block’), a main building (called the ‘Tower Block’) and many outbuildings.

=== Albion Building ===
The Albion Building contains classrooms for the arts, a sports hall, canteen, auditorium and 'Activity Studio'.

=== Springhead Building ===
The Springhead Building contains classrooms for many subjects and the library.

=== Moons Building ===
The Moons Building contains other classrooms and specialised facilities for the Sixth Form, including a specialised canteen, common room, IT room and more. The Moons Building was built in the 1990s and opened in 1997.

=== Field ===
Guiseley School also has a field, used for PE lessons and their annual school run known as the 'Guiseley Schoolrun'. It also has an all-weather pitch installed in 2025.

== Notable alumni ==
- Andy Haldane, Chief Economist at the Bank of England
- Alan Greaves, Archaeologist and lecturer at the University of Liverpool
- Peter Grant, Jazz singer
- Josh Windass, Footballer for Wrexham AFC
- Beverley Tew CMG, Lead Non-Executive Director at the Foreign, Commonwealth & Development Office,

== Notable staff ==
- Ian Moor, Stars In Their Eyes, Champion of Champions
- Frank Hadden, Rugby union coach
