= Peter Grant (singer) =

English singer

Peter Grant (born 1987 in Leeds, Yorkshire, England) is an English singer of easy listening and jazz music.

== Life and career ==
Peter Grant began singing at the age of six and played at working men's clubs from the age of 12. He grew up in Guiseley, north-west of Leeds, West Yorkshire, and was a pupil at Guiseley High School.

His first album New Vintage was released in April 2006, and entered at No. 8 on the UK Albums Chart, largely thanks to his chat show appearances with Michael Parkinson, Davina McCall and GMTV, where he made his TV debut.

His second album Traditional was released on 17 September 2007.

He can also be heard singing "Happy Together" on a Twix advertisement, a cover of the Turtles song. He released his download-only single "Traditional" on 10 September 2007.

Promotion of his second UK album saw Grant perform on GMTV, This Morning and The Alan Titchmarsh Show all on ITV1. The album did not perform as well as his debut, peaking at No. 29 on the UK Albums Chart.

He sold out five performances at Ronnie Scott's Jazz Club in October and December 2007.

== Discography ==
=== Albums ===
- New Vintage - #8 UK (gold)
- Traditional - #29 UK
- Peter Grant

=== Singles ===
- "Too Close" (2011)
- "When You Were My Girl" (2012)
