= Paul Norton (rugby league) =

English rugby league footballer

Playing information
- Position: Second-row, Loose forward
Club
Years	Team	Pld	T	G	FG	P
1977–83	Castleford	105	7	174	0	369
Representative
Years	Team	Pld	T	G	FG	P
1979	Yorkshire	0	0	0	0	0

Paul Norton is a former professional rugby league footballer who played in the 1970s and 1980s. He played at representative level for Yorkshire, and at club level for Castleford, as a second-row or loose forward. (Note: Not to be confused with the rugby league prop who played in the 1990s and 2000s for Lancashire, Lancashire Lynx, and Oldham)

== Playing career ==
=== County honours ===
Paul Norton was an unused substitute for Yorkshire while at Castleford in the 13–17 defeat by Cumberland at Derwent Park, Workington on 29 August 1979.

=== County Cup Final appearances ===
Paul Norton appeared as a substitute (replacing prop Alan Hardy) in Castleford's 10–5 victory over Bradford Northern in the 1981 Yorkshire Cup Final during the 1981–82 season at Headingley, Leeds, on Saturday 3 October 1981.
