= Terry Richardson (rugby league) =

England international rugby league footballer

Personal information
- Full name: Terrence Richardson
- Born: unknown

Playing information
- Position: Wing
Club
Years	Team	Pld	T	G	FG	P
1973–83	Castleford	237	102	0	0	306
1983–84	Kent Invicta	8	2	0	0	8
	Total	245	104	0	0	314
Representative
Years	Team	Pld	T	G	FG	P
1979	Great Britain U-24	1	0	0	0	0
1981	England	1	0	0	0	0
1981–82	Yorkshire	3	3	0	0	9

Terrence Richardson (birth unknown) is an English former professional rugby league footballer who played in the 1970s and 1980s. He played at representative level for England, and at club level for Castleford and Kent Invicta, as a wing.

== Playing career ==
=== Castleford ===
Terry Richardson played on the wing in Castleford's 17–7 victory over Featherstone Rovers in the 1977 Yorkshire Cup Final during the 1977–78 season at Headingley, Leeds on 15 October 1977, and also played in the 10–5 victory over Bradford Northern in the 1981 Yorkshire Cup Final during the 1981–82 season at Headingley, Leeds on 3 October 1981.

At the end of his career, he spent one season at Kent Invicta, making eight appearances.

=== International honours ===
Terry Richardson won a cap for England while at Castleford in the 17–4 victory over Wales at Old Craven Park on 18 March 1981.
