= Guiseley Theatre =

Municipal building in Guiseley, West Yorkshire, England

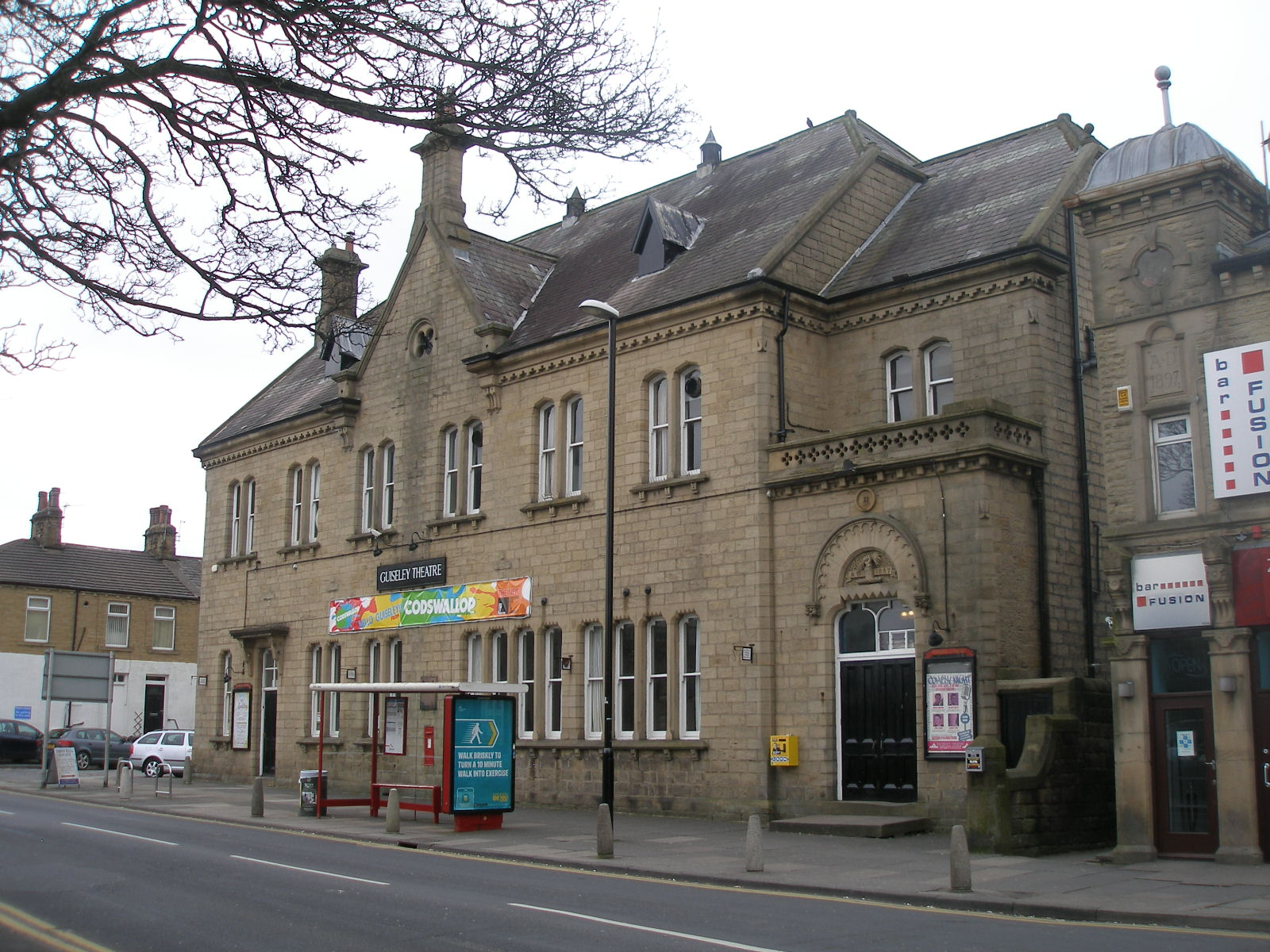
- Guiseley Theatre

- Shown in West Yorkshire
- 53.8720°N 1.7071°W
- Location: The Green, Guiseley

History
- Built: 1867

Site notes
- Architect(s): Knowles and Wilcock
- Architectural style: Neoclassical style

Guiseley Theatre, formerly Guiseley Town Hall, is a municipal building at The Green, Guiseley, West Yorkshire, England. The structure, which was once the headquarters of Guiseley Urban District Council, is now a theatre.

== History ==
A local board of health was established to make improvements in Guiseley in September 1863 and, following an offer from the member of parliament, Matthew Thompson, to pay most of the cost, the board decided to commission purpose-built offices for the administration of the town.

The foundation stone for the new building was laid by Thompson's eldest daughter, Eliza Thompson, on 7 July 1867. It was designed by Knowles and Wilcock of Bradford in the neoclassical style, built in ashlar stone at a cost of £3,000 and was officially opened on 26 December 1867. The event was celebrated by a performance of The Messiah by George Frideric Handel. Thompson formally handed over the deeds of the property to the chairman of the local board of health in the presence of Lord Frederick Cavendish, Canon James Atlay and the Mayor of Bradford, James Law, in March 1868.

The design involved a symmetrical main frontage with seven bays facing onto The Green; the right hand end bay contained a doorway with a fanlight surmounted by a semi-circular carving containing Thompson's coat of arms which depicted a raised arm holding a sheaf of barley, recalling Thompson's role as the proprietor of the Bradford Brewery. On the first floor, the right hand end bay was deeply recessed and fenestrated by a pair of mullioned windows. The main section, to the left of the left hand end bay, contained a doorway in the second bay from the left and was fenestrated by a series of irregularly-spaced windows on the ground floor and by six pairs of mullioned windows on the first floor. At roof level, there was a cornice and central gable containing quatrefoil. Internally, the principal rooms were the main hall, a public reading room, a library, a school room and the board rooms.

Following a significant growth in population, largely associated with the woollen industry, the area became an urban district with the town hall as its headquarters in 1894. In the early 20th century, the Guiseley Amateur Operatic Society arranged public performances such as the opéra comique, Les cloches de Corneville, in 1903, the opera, The Bohemian Girl, in 1904 and the comic opera, The Mikado, in 1905. The town hall briefly operated as a cinema in 1913 before being converted into an auxiliary hospital for wounded service personnel in August 1916 during the First World War. The town hall ceased to be the local seat of government when the enlarged Aireborough District Council was formed at Micklefield House in Rawdon in 1937. During the Second World War the town hall served as a base for the Air Raid Precautions (ARP) wardens and was fitted with an air raid siren.

Following local government reorganisation in 1974, the town hall passed to Leeds City Council and the condition of the building was allowed to deteriorate; the Guiseley Amateur Operatic Society launched a campaign to take over the building for the benefit of the town. In 1981, the comedian, Ken Dodd, put on a show in the town hall with all the proceeds donated to the campaign. The campaign achieved its aims and Guiseley Amateur Operatic Society took over responsibility for the town hall in 1985, at which time it was renamed the Guiseley Theatre. The building then passed into the ownership of a Community Interest Company in 2019.
