= Jack Brumfitt =

English cricketer

Jack Brumfitt (18 February 1917 – 16 March 1987) was an English first-class cricketer, who played one match for Yorkshire County Cricket Club in 1938.

Born in Guiseley, Yorkshire, England, Brumfitt scored nine runs in his only innings against Glamorgan at The Circle, Kingston upon Hull. It was a thrilling match, with Yorkshire declaring their second innings on 68 for 5, and then bowling out the visitors for 150, to win by 12 runs with Frank Smailes taking 8 for 68.

Brumfitt also played for Yorkshire Second XI in the Minor Counties Championship from 1935 to 1938, and for the Craven Gentlemen against Ireland in 1947. He was a sound and reliable opener for Bradford and Ilkley, and he also played for the Craven Gentlemen and Hawks. At rugby union, he represented Ilkley, Otley and Yorkshire and, whilst in the R.A.F., appeared for Coventry and Warwickshire.

He died, aged 70, in March 1987 in Ilkley, West Yorkshire.
