= Andy Haldane =

British economist

Andy Haldane CBE FRS FAcSS FRSA
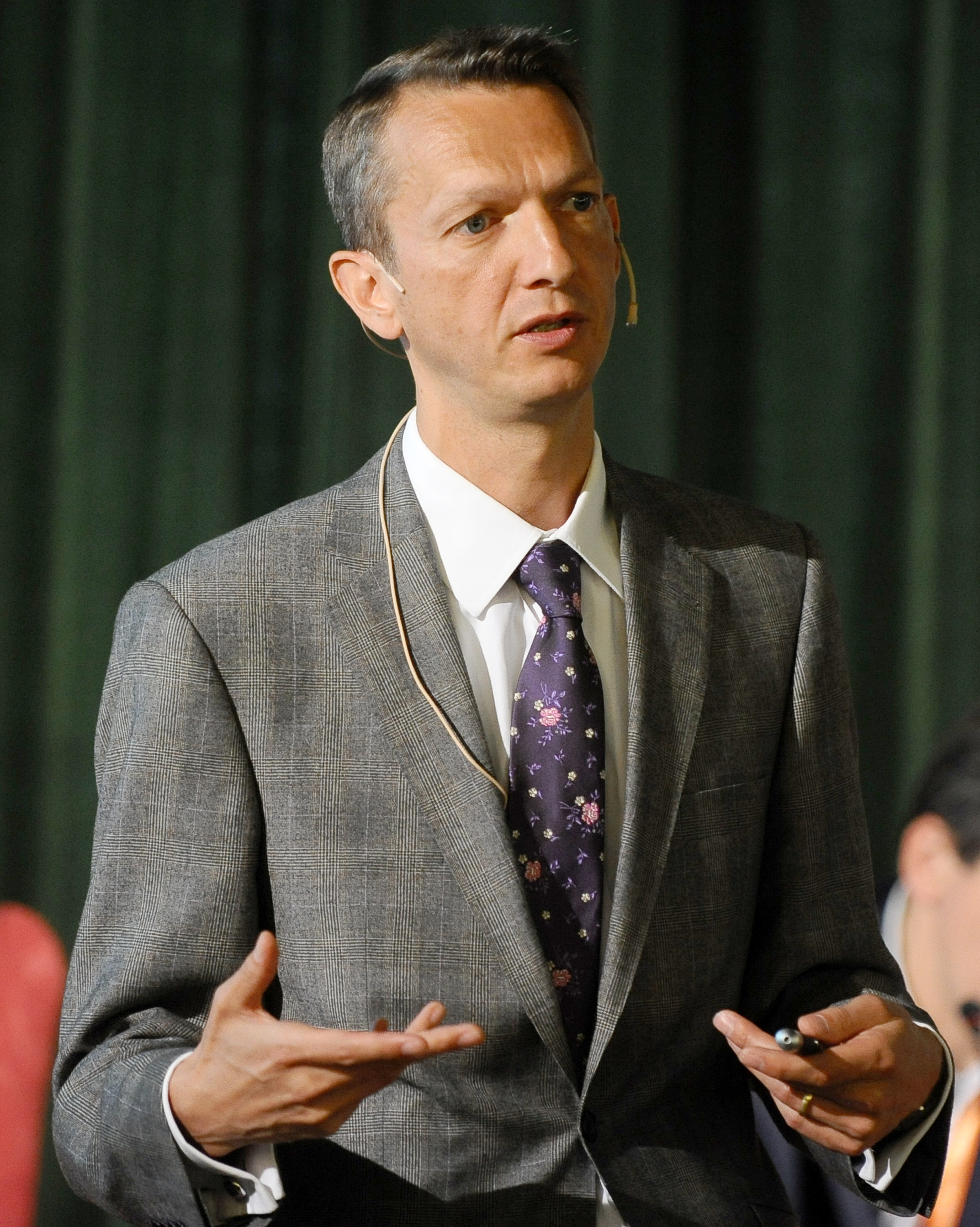
- Haldane in Trento, Italy in 2013
- Born: Andrew George Haldane; 18 August 1967 (age 59); Tyne and Wear, England
- Education: Guiseley School; University of Sheffield; University of Warwick
- Occupation: Economist
- Employer(s): Bank of England; Royal Society of Arts
- Scientific career
- Fields: Monetary policy Macroeconomic theory Monetary economics

Andrew George Haldane CBE FRS FAcSS FRSA (/ˈhɔːldeɪn/; born 18 August 1967) is a British economist who worked at the Bank of England between 1989 and 2021 progressing to the role of chief economist and executive director of monetary analysis and statistics. He moved from the Bank of England in June 2021 to serve as chief executive of the Royal Society for Arts, which he resigned from in February 2025, making his tenure the shortest in the institution's history. He sits on the UK's government's Economic Advisory Council, and is currently the Chancellor of the University of Sheffield.

== Education ==
Born in Sunderland, Haldane was educated at Guiseley School in north Leeds. He did not study mathematics at A-level, teaching himself; he said that he was "very far from being natural at maths" and struggles teaching his children the subject. He received a Bachelor of Arts (BA) degree in economics from the University of Sheffield in 1988 and a Master of Arts (MA) degree in economics from the University of Warwick in 1989.

== Career ==
Haldane joined the Bank of England in 1989. He worked in monetary analysis, on various issues regarding monetary policy strategy, inflation targeting, and central bank independence. He had a secondment to work at the International Monetary Fund. Haldane's senior experience back in the Bank of England includes heading up the International Finance Division and the Market Infrastructure Division. In 2005 Haldane assumed responsibility for the Systemic Risk Assessment Division within the Financial Stability department. In 2009 he became the Bank of England's executive director of financial stability.

Haldane has been widely cited as a leading Bank of England expert on financial stability and is a co-author with Adair Turner and others of the London School of Economics The Future of Finance report. His 2012 speech, called "The Dog and the Frisbee"—delivered to the Federal Reserve Bank of Kansas City's annual Jackson Hole, Wyoming meeting—received widespread attention in the financial media and prompted Forbes to describe him as a "rising star central banker". In the speech, Haldane drew on behavioural economics, specifically the work on the ecological rationality of fast-and-frugal heuristics by Gerd Gigerenzer, to argue that complex financial systems cannot be controlled with complex regulations.

In October 2012 Haldane said the Occupy movement protesters had been right to criticise the financial sector and had persuaded bankers and politicians "to behave in a more moral way".

Interviewed on the BBC's The World at One radio programme, ahead of the chancellor's 2012 Autumn Statement, Haldane said the financial effect of the bank crisis, i.e., the loss of income and damage to output was as severe as a world war. He feared the cost would fall on the next generation or even the generation afterwards. Public anger was justified as banks had made loans which could never be repaid and these loans were sold on around the world creating the subprime mortgage crisis. The banks still had undeclared risky assets. In the meantime, bankers' pay, which in 1980 was comparable with a doctor or lawyer, had risen to four times that value by 2006 and Haldane said it needs to fall to that of other professions.

Haldane said in a speech on 4 April 2014 to a financial audience that "too big to fail" risks that are being tackled by reforms at major banks were applicable to the asset-management industry, calling it the "next frontier" for macroprudential policy. He introduced the "non-bank, non-insurer globally systemically important financial institution" (NBNI G-SIFIs) into the lexicon at this event[which event?] and detailed the thrust of regulators as "modulating the price of risk, when this is materially mispriced, could be every bit as important as controlling its quantity".

Haldane said in March 2017 that "Bad managers stand accused of holding back economic growth in the UK by undermining productivity, preventing pay and living standards rising."

Haldane said in 2017 the rise in self-employment and drop in union membership mirrors weak workforces of the pre-1750 era. He also said a period of "divide and conquer" had left workers less able to bargain for higher wages. "There is power in numbers. A workforce that is more easily divided than in the past may find itself more easily conquered."

In April 2021, he announced that he was resigning from the Bank of England in June and becoming chief executive of the Royal Society for Arts in September, replacing Matthew Taylor. In September 2023, RSA workers voted to strike for the first time in the organisation's history, saying management had entered into pay negotiations in "bad faith". Haldane's tenure was later described by the IWGB as "reflect(ing) a style of leadership that concentrates power, disregards collective voices and deepens division rather than overcoming it."

In September 2021, Haldane was appointed as the head of the Levelling Up Taskforce in the newly renamed Department for Levelling Up, Housing and Communities, under Secretary of State Michael Gove.

In April 2023, Haldane was appointed to HM Treasury's Economic Advisory Council.

In January 2026, he became the Chancellor of the University of Sheffield, replacing Anne Rafferty. In June 2026, it was reported that he was advising Andy Burnham in advance of a potential leadership bid.

=== Pro Bono Economics ===
Haldane and Martin Brookes co-founded a charity called Pro Bono Economics, which aims to persuade economists to donate their time and expertise to help charities on a pro bono basis. It has partnered with charities such as St Giles Trust and Barnardo's. They tapped Gus O'Donnell to help promote the initiative.

It is also backed by Gavyn Davies, former BBC head; Howard Davies, London School of Economics director; Rachel Lomax, former Bank of England deputy director on the Monetary Policy Committee; Adair Turner, who chaired the now-defunct Financial Services Authority; and Jim O'Neill, the Goldman Sachs economist who came up with the term BRIC: Brazil, Russia, India and China.

=== Honours and awards ===
In 2016, Haldane was elected a Fellow of the Academy of Social Sciences (FAcSS). In 2019, he was awarded an honorary doctorate from the University of Warwick. In 2021, he was elected a Fellow of the Royal Society (FRS).

Haldane was appointed Commander of the Order of the British Empire (CBE) in the 2023 Birthday Honours for services to the economy and public policy.

In 2014 he was named by Time magazine as amongst the world's 100 most influential people.

In 2023, Haldane was named as the UK's forty-fourth most powerful left-wing figure by the New Statesman.

=== Publications ===
Haldane has authored (or co-authored) more than 70 articles and three books on inflation targeting, central bank independence, international financial crises, financial stability frameworks and payment systems, along with notable analysis critical of the remuneration models that divorce capital control from its ownership in the financial services sector, where stewardship bonuses are rewarded regardless of loss or gains to clients, contrary to rational norms of fiduciary duty. His published books include:

- The Future of Payment Systems
- Fixing Financial Crises in the 21st Century

== Personal life ==
Haldane lives in south London with his three children. His ex-wife Emma Hardaker-Jones is Chief People Officer at National Grid

Haldane became a trustee of the independent charity National Numeracy in 2016. He is also an ambassador for the volunteering network REACH.

He is a supporter of Sunderland A.F.C.
