= Ian Birkby =

English rugby league footballer and technology business CEO

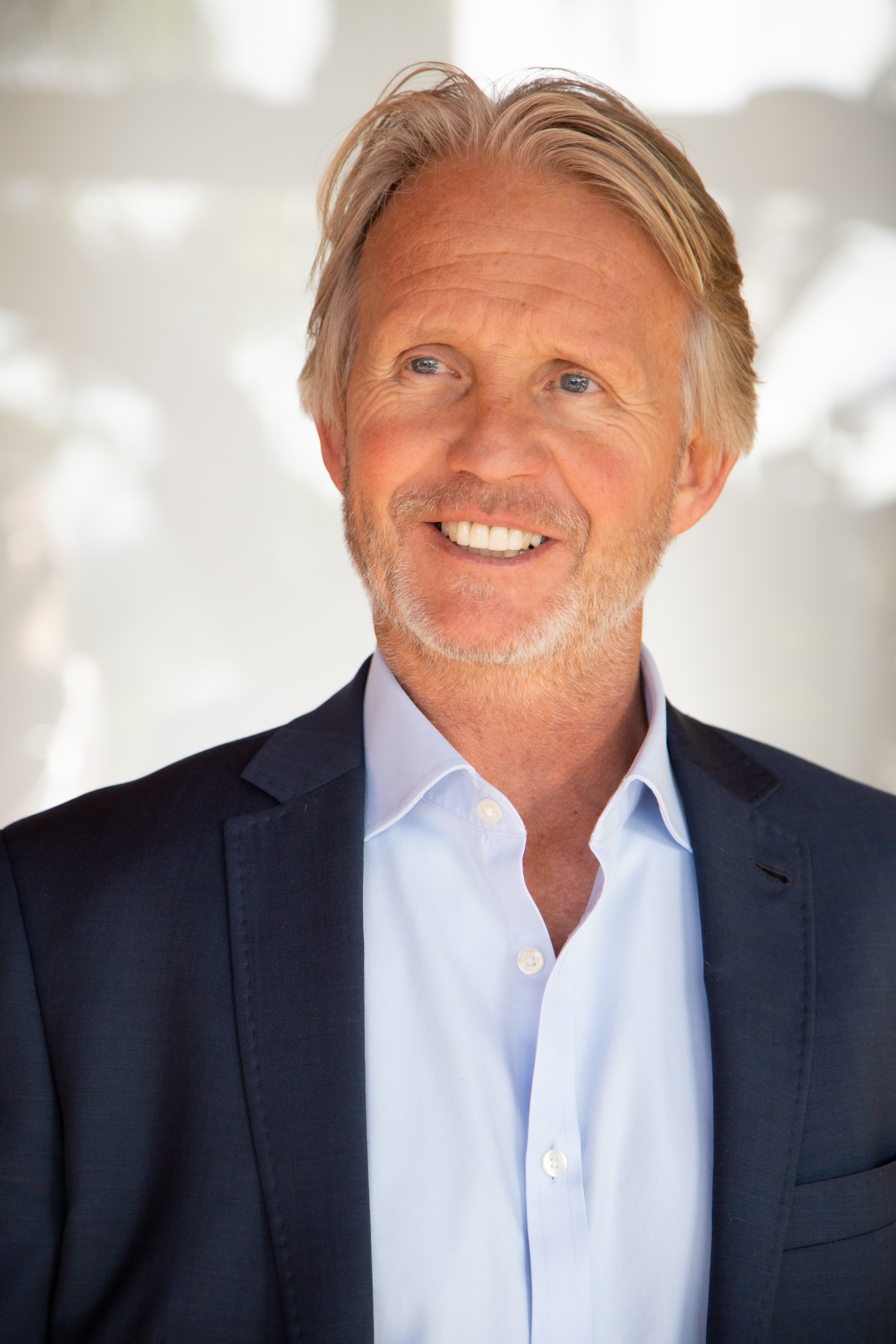

Personal information
- Full name: Ian Birkby
- Born: third quarter 1961 (age 63–64); Pontefract, England

Playing information
- Position: Stand-off
Club
| Years | Team | Pld | T | G | FG | P |
|---|---|---|---|---|---|---|
| 1979–83 | Castleford | 46 | 13 | 38 | 1 | 116 |
| 1983–86 | Oldham | 36+9 | 10 | 0 | 1 | 41 |
| 1985–86 | York |
| 1986–88 | Doncaster | 34 | 2 | 6 | 0 | 20 |
| | Total | 125 | 25 | 44 | 2 | 177 |

Ian Birkby (born in September, 1961) is a technology CEO, Ph.D. and former professional rugby league footballer who played as a stand-off in the 1970s and 1980s. Presently, he is the chief executive officer of AZoNetwork.

He played at club level for Castleford, Oldham, York and Doncaster.

== Sporting career ==
Whilst studying at university, Birkby played as a professional rugby player representing Castleford at scrum half from 1980 to 1983 before moving to Oldham RLFC with a brief stint at York RLFC before finishing his career at Doncaster.

He returned to playing rugby union in his thirties. However, he was prevented from playing for amateur team Wilmslow RUFC in the 1990s. This was due to a rule between the rugby league and the English Rugby Football Union which prevented professional players of the 13-man code from playing the amateur 15 a-side game.

== Technology career ==
Birkby headed Dynamic-Ceramic prior to its sale in 1997. He founded AZoM in 2001. In 2016, AZoNetwork was listed by BRW as one of the 100 fastest growing companies in Australia. The company announced in October 2019 that it would be listing in a reverse IPO on the Australian Securities Exchange in 2020.
