= Hugh Claughton =

English cricketer

Hugh Marsden Claughton (24 December 1891 – 17 October 1980) was a first-class cricketer who played one match for Yorkshire County Cricket Club in 1914 and three more, including the Roses match, in 1919. He was an all rounder who scored 39 runs at an average of 6.50, and took three wickets with his right arm medium pace. He was the professional at Baildon Green C.C. for some years.

Claughton was born in Guiseley, Leeds, and died at the age of 88, in October 1980 in Middleton, Harrogate, Yorkshire. His great nephew, John Claughton, played first-class cricket for Warwickshire from 1978 to 1980.
