= George Claughton =

English rugby league footballer

Playing information
- Position: Fullback, Wing
Club
Years	Team	Pld	T	G	FG	P
1971–83	Castleford	142	13	1	0	41

George Claughton is a former professional rugby league footballer who played in the 1970s and 1980s. He played at club level for Castleford, as a fullback or wing.

== Playing career ==
=== County Cup Final appearances ===
George Claughton played fullback in Castleford's 10-5 victory over Bradford Northern in the 1981 Yorkshire Cup Final during the 1981–82 season at Headingley, Leeds, on Saturday 3 October 1981.
