= John Andrew Claughton =

English cricketer

Personal information
- Full name: John Andrew Claughton
- Born: 28 October 1978; Southampton, Hampshire, England
- Died: 6 April 2026 (aged 47)
- Batting: Right-handed
- Bowling: Right-arm medium
- Relatives: John Claughton (uncle); Tom Claughton (cousin)

Domestic team information
- Years: Team
- 1998–2000: Oxford University
- 2000: Oxford Universities

Career statistics
Competition	First-class
Matches	15
Runs scored	503
Batting average	25.15
100s/50s	–/3
Top score	85
Catches/stumpings	4/–
- Source: Cricinfo, 23 February 2020

John Andrew Claughton (28 October 1978 – 6 April 2026) was an English first-class cricketer.

The nephew of the cricketer John Claughton senior, he was born at Southampton in October 1978. He was educated at King Edward's School, Southampton before going up to Keble College, Oxford. While studying at Oxford, he played first-class cricket for Oxford University, making his debut against Worcestershire at Oxford in 1998. He played twelve further first-class matches for Oxford to 2000, scoring 477 runs at an average of 29.81, with a high score of 85. He also made two first-class appearances for an Oxford Universities side in 2000, a forerunner of Oxford UCCE which was formed in 2001. His cousin, Tom, also played first-class cricket.

Claughton died on 6 April 2026, at the age of 47.
