= John Alan Claughton =

English cricketer (born 1956)

John Claughton
Personal information
- Full name: John Alan Claughton
- Born: 17 September 1956 (age 70); Guiseley, Yorkshire, England
- Batting: Right-handed
- Relatives: Tom Claughton (son); John Claughton (nephew); Hugh Claughton (great-uncle)

Domestic team information
- Years: Team
- 1988–1993: Dorset
- 1983–1986: Berkshire
- 1983: Minor Counties
- 1979–1980: Warwickshire
- 1978: Combined Universities
- 1976–1979: Oxford University

Career statistics
Competition	FC	LA
Matches	55	28
Runs scored	1,910	517
Batting average	21.46	20.68
100s/50s	4/5	–/2
Top score	130	65
Balls bowled	3	6
Wickets	–	–
Bowling average	–	–
5 wickets in innings	–	–
10 wickets in match	–	–
Best bowling	–	–
Catches/stumpings	21/–	7/–
- Source: Cricinfo, 5 April 2010

John Alan Claughton (born 17 September 1956, in Guiseley, Leeds) is a former Chief Master of King Edward's School, Birmingham (K.E.S.), and a former English first-class cricketer. Claughton was a right-handed batsman.

== Cricket career ==
In 1975, Claughton was captain of his school cricket team (K.E.S.) where he later became chief master. He made his first-class debut for Oxford University against Gloucestershire in 1976 scoring a century in the second innings thus scoring a century on debut. Claughton played 37 first-class matches for the university from 1976 to 1979, with his final first-class match for Oxford coming against Cambridge University. In his 37 first-class matches for the university, he scored 1,365 runs at a batting average of 21.32, with five half centuries and two centuries, with a high score of 130 against Sussex in 1978.

Additionally, in 1978 he made his List-A debut for the Combined Universities against Hampshire in the 1978 Benson and Hedges Cup, during which he played 3 further List-A matches in the tournament for the team.

In 1978, Claughton made his first-class debut for Warwickshire against Lancashire in the County Championship. Claughton represented Warwickshire in 18 first-class matches from 1978 to 1980, with his final first-class match coming against the touring West Indians. In his 15 first-class appearances for the county, he scored 545 runs at an average of 21.80, with two centuries and a high score of 108* against Worcestershire in 1980.

In 1980, Claughton made his List-A debut for Warwickshire against Hampshire in the 1980 John Player League. He represented the county in 18 List-A matches, with his final one-day match for the county coming against Derbyshire in the 1980 season. In his 18 List-A matches for the county, he scored 367 runs at an average of 24.46, with two half centuries and a high score of 65 against Yorkshire.

In his overall first-class career, he scored 1,910 runs at an average of 21.46, with four centuries and a highest score of 130.

== Minor Counties career ==
In 1982, Claughton made his Berkshire debut in the 1982 Minor Counties Championship against Buckinghamshire. Claughton played 22 Minor Counties matches for Berkshire, with his final Minor Counties match for the county coming against the Somerset Second XI in the 1986 Minor Counties Championship. In 1983, he made his List-A debut for Berkshire against Yorkshire in the 1st round of the 1983 NatWest Trophy. Claughton played 2 further List-A matches for the county, with his final one-day match for Berkshire coming against Hampshire in the 1st round of the 1985 NatWest Trophy.

In 1983, Claughton made a single List-A appearance for the Minor Counties against Sussex in the 1983 Benson and Hedges Cup.

In 1988, Claughton made his Dorset debut in the 1988 Minor Counties Championship against Devon. Claughton played 33 Minor Counties matches for Dorset, with his final Minor Counties match coming against Berkshire in 1993. In 1989, he made his List-A debut for Dorset against Kent in the 1st round of the 1989 NatWest Trophy. Claughton made one further List-A appearance for Dorset against Lancashire in the 1st round of the 1991 NatWest Trophy.

In his overall List-A career, he scored 517 runs at an average of 20.68, with two half centuries and a high score of 65.

== Teaching ==
Claughton's main career was as a schoolmaster teaching Latin and Classical Greek. He was a master at Eton College from 1984 to 2001, where he was also in charge of cricket, and then was appointed Headmaster at Solihull School (2001–2005). In 2006, he returned to his own old school to become Chief Master at King Edward's School, Birmingham where he introduced the International Baccalaureate. Claughton retired from his post as Chief Master in July 2016, a decision he announced in 2015 after suffering a stroke, and was succeeded by Dr Mark Fenton. In 2016, in the Tatler Schools Awards Claughton was named as 'Best Head of Public School'. Since his retirement, Claughton has been critical of independent education in the UK.

== Writing ==
Claughton has written 2 books, and contributed to one more:

- Herodotus and the Persian Wars (Greece and Rome: Texts and Contexts)
- Aristophanes: Clouds (Cambridge Translations from Greek Drama).
- Ancient History (with Robin Osborne, in The Teaching of Classics ed. James Morwood, Cambridge University Press, 2003) ISBN 9780521527637
