= List of Barrow Raiders players =

Barrow Raiders are an English rugby league club who have had numerous notable players throughout their history.

== Players earning international caps while at Barrow ==
- Robert "Bob" Ayres won caps for England while at Barrow 1938 Wales, France, 1945 Wales
- William "Bill" Burgess won caps for England while at Barrow 1923 Wales, 1924 Other Nationalities, 1925 Wales (2 matches), 1926 Wales, Other Nationalities, 1928 Wales, 1930 Other Nationalities won caps for Great Britain while at Barrow 1924 Australia (3 matches), New Zealand (3 matches), 1926-27 New Zealand (3 matches), 1928 Australia (3 matches), New Zealand (2 matches), 1929-30 Australia (2 matches)
- William "Bill" Burgess won caps for England while at Barrow 1962 France, 1969 Wales, France won caps for Great Britain while at Barrow 1962 France, 1963 Australia, 1965 New Zealand (2 matches), 1966 France, Australia (3 matches), New Zealand (2 matches), 1967 France, Australia, 1968 France, while at Salford 1969 France
- David Cairns won caps for England while at Barrow 1984 Wales won caps for Great Britain while at Barrow 1984 France (2 matches)
- Chris Camilleri won caps for Wales while at Barrow in 1980 against France, while at Widnes in 1982 against Australia, and while at Cardiff City (Bridgend) Blue Dragons in 1984 against England, and won caps for Great Britain while at Barrow in 1980 against New Zealand (2 matches)
- Charles "Charlie" W. Carr won caps for England while at Barrow 1924 Other Nationalities, 1925 Wales (2 matches), 1926 Wales, Other Nationalities, 1927 Wales, 1928 Wales won caps for Great Britain while at Barrow 1924 Australia (2 matches), New Zealand (2 matches), 1926-27 New Zealand (3 matches)
- Frank Castle won caps for England while at Barrow 1951 France, 1952 Other Nationalities (2 matches), Wales, 1953 Other Nationalities won caps for Great Britain while at Barrow 1952 Australia (3 matches), 1954 Australia
- David "Dave" Clarke won caps for Wales while at Barrow Raiders 2004(…2005?) 2-caps
- Val Cumberbatch won caps for England while at Barrow 1938 France
- John Cunningham won caps for England while at Barrow 1975 France, Wales
- Roy Francis won a cap for Great Britain while at Barrow in 1947 against New Zealand
- Harry Gifford won caps for England while at Barrow 1908 Wales, 1909 Australia (3 matches) won caps for Great Britain while at Barrow 1908-9 Australia (2 matches)
- Dennis Goodwin won caps for England while at Barrow 1955 Other Nationalities won caps for Great Britain while at Barrow 1957 France (2 matches), 1958 France, New Zealand (2 matches)
- John "Jack" Grundy won caps for Great Britain while at Barrow 1955 New Zealand (3 matches), 1956 Australia (3 matches), 1957 France (4 matches), Australia, New Zealand (World Cup 1957 3-caps, 1-try)
- George Gummer won caps for Wales while at Barrow 1936 2-caps
- Philip "Phil" Hogan won caps for England while at Hull K.R. 1979 France won caps for Great Britain while at Barrow 1977 France, New Zealand, Australia (2 matches), 1978 Australia (sub), while at Hull K.R. 1979 Australia, Australia (sub), New Zealand, New Zealand (sub)
- William "Willie" Horne won caps for England while at Barrow 1945 Wales (2 matches), 1946 France (2 matches), Wales (2 matches), 1947 France, Wales, 1949 Other Nationalities, 1952 Other Nationalities, Wales, 1953 France, Wales, Other Nationalities won caps for Great Britain while at Barrow 1946 Australia (3 matches), 1947 New Zealand, 1948 Australia, 1952 Australia (3 matches)
- Frederick "Fred" Hughes won caps for Wales while at Barrow, and Workington Town 1945…1946 3-caps
- George Hughes, won a cap for England (RU) while at Barrow in 1896 against Scotland
- Phil Jackson won caps for England while at Barrow 1955 Other Nationalities won caps for Great Britain while at Barrow 1954 Australia (3 matches), New Zealand (3 matches), 1954 France (2 matches), Australia, New Zealand, 1955 New Zealand (3 matches), 1956 Australia (3 matches), 1957 France, New Zealand, France (5 matches), 1958 France, Australia (2 matches), New Zealand (World Cup 1954 4-caps 3-tries, 1957 2-caps, 2-tries)
- Keith Jarrett won caps for Wales (RU) while at Newport RFC (RU) 10-caps, won caps for British Lions (RU) while at Newport RFC (RU) ?-caps, won caps for Wales while at Barrow 1970 (1?)2-caps 1-try 3-points
- Joseph "Joe" Jones won caps for Wales while at Wigan and Barrow 1940…1949 15-caps, and won a cap for Great Britain while at Barrow in 1946 against New Zealand
- Bryn Knowelden won caps for England while at Barrow 1944 Wales, 1945 Wales, 1947 France won caps for Great Britain while at Barrow 1946 New Zealand
- James "Jimmy" Lewthwaite won caps for England while at Barrow 1952 Other Nationalities
- William "Billy" Little won caps for England while at Barrow 1933 Other Nationalities, 1934 Australia, France
- Mark McJennett won caps for Wales while at Barrow 1980…1984 2-caps + 1-cap (sub), Australia, France and England
- Reg Parker won caps for England while at Barrow 1955 Other Nationalities
- Gordon Pritchard won caps for Wales while at Barrow, and Cardiff City (Bridgend) Blue Dragons 1978…1981 1(3?)-caps + 2-caps (sub)
- Barry Pugh won caps for Wales while at Barrow Raiders 2004(…2005?) 2-caps
- Edmund "Eddie" Szymala won caps for England while at Barrow 1979 France (sub) won caps for Great Britain while at Barrow 1981 France (sub), France
- Edward "Ted" Toohey won caps for England while at Barrow 1952 Other Nationalities (2 matches) won caps for Great Britain while at Barrow 1952 Australia (3 matches)
- Alec Troup won caps for England while at Barrow 1934 Australia, France, 1935 Wales, 1936 Wales won caps for Great Britain while at Barrow 1936 New Zealand (2 matches)
- John "Jack" T. 'Tank' Woods won caps for England while at Barrow 1930 Other Nationalities, 1930 Wales, 1933 Other Nationalities won caps for Great Britain while at Barrow 1933 Australia

== Other notable players ==
These players have either; won or played in the final of Challenge Cup, Rugby Football League Championship, Lancashire County Cup, Lancashire League, have received a Testimonial match, were international representatives before, or after, their time at Barrow, or are notable outside of rugby league.

- Fred 'Legs' Atkins 1959 Hooker Corporation Combine ARLFC, Barrow Island ARLFC (loan to Blackpool Borough) born circa-1937, died (aged 75) in Blackpool’s Victoria Hospital Thursday 28 June 2012, 1-appearance away against Warrington in December 1959, pigeon fancier
- Harry Atkinson 1951 Challenge Cup
- Phil Atkinson 125-tries
- Brian Backhouse circa-1967
- (Australia) Harry Bath
- Les Belshaw 1955 Challenge Cup Left-Prop
- Clive Best 1955 Challenge Cup Fullback
- Cliff Beverley
- Matthew Blake
- Walter "Wally" Bowyer 1951 Challenge Cup (reserve), 1955 Challenge Cup assistant coach
- Andy Bracek
- Gary Broadbent
- Andrew Brocklehurst
- Thomas "Tom" Brophy 1966-1972
- Liam Campbell
- Keale Carlile
- Mick Cassidy
- Ned Catic
- (Australia) Robert "Rob" Cummins
- James "Jim" Challinor circa-1967
- David Chisnall
- Paul Crarey
- Henry Delooze circa-1967
- George Dobson (Testimonial match 1922)
- Joseph "Joe" Doyle
- Robert "Bob" Eccles circa-1993
- Andrew Ellis
- Malcolm Flynn (Testimonial match 1986)
- Frank Foster
- James Fox 100-tries
- Freddie French Fullback circa-1938
- Ade Gardner
- Ken Gill
- Derek Hadley (Testimonial match 1983)
- Roy Haggerty
- John 'Dinks' Harris
- Liam Harrison
- Ralph Hartley 1951 Challenge Cup
- (Australia) Kevin Hastings
- Bill Healey 1955 Challenge Cup Loose forward
- Andrew Henderson
- Cavill Heugh
- John Higgin 1933≥1947 1946/7 Testimonial matches
- Frank Hill circa-1954, 1955 Challenge Cup trainer
- John Holmes
- Darren Holt (Testimonial match 2009)
- Raymond "Ray" Hopwood circa-1967
- Adam Hughes
- Harry Hughes circa-1967
- Robert Irving
- Matt James
- Michael "Mick" James (Testimonial match 1990)
- Ivor Kelland circa-1967
- David "Dave" Kendall (#10) circa-1987
- James King
- Michael Knowles
- Simon Knox
- Sevania Koroi
- Danny Leatherbarrow circa-1954
- Hugh Lloyd-Davies
- Ian Lloyd
- Frank Longman (#8) circa-1948 → 1951 Challenge Cup
- Zebastian Lucky Luisi
- Matthew McConnell
- Ralph McConnell circa-1981 107-tries
- Hughie McGregor 1951 Challenge Cup
- Dan McKeating from Whitehaven (Recreation?) Hooker 1932≥1947 1946/7 Testimonial matches
- Joseph "Joe" McKeever
- Jack McKinnell 1951 Challenge Cup
- Martin McLoughlin
- R. McLester circa-1922
- John Mantle
- Iain Marsh
- Steve Mossop (Testimonial match 1990)
- Michael "Mike" Murray circa-1967
- James Nixon
- Ron O'Regan
- James Peters
- Steve Rae (#6) circa-1987
- Rod Reddy
- Maurice Redhead circa-1967
- Damien Reid
- John Risman
- Jason Roach
- Jamie Rooney
- Steve Rowan circa-1992
- Paul Salmon
- Michael "Mike" Sanderson circa-1967
- Walter Scott 175-tries
- Thomas "Tommy" Smales
- Gerald "Ged" Smith circa-1967
- Harry Stretch 1951 Challenge Cup
- Waisale Sukanaveita
- Alipate Tani
- Edward "Eddie" Tees circa-1967
- Jim Thornburrow circa-1938
- Steve Tickle (Testimonial match 1988)
- Cec Thompson (#11/#12)
- Frederick "Fred" Tomlinson circa-1967
- Hugh Waddell
- Michael "Mike" Watson circa-1967
- Bob Wear circa-1967
- Pat Weisner
- Alan Whittle
