= Henry Ogden =

Henry Ogden may refer to:

- Henry Alexander Ogden (1856–1936), American illustrator
- Henry Warren Ogden (1842–1905), U.S. Representative from Louisiana

== See also ==
- Harry Ogden (1924–1980), English rugby league footballer
