= George Dobson =

George Dobson may refer to:

- George Dobson (rugby union) (1873–1917), Welsh rugby union forward
- George Dobson (rugby league), English rugby league footballer of the 1900s, 1910s and 1920s
- George Dobson (footballer, born 1862) (1862–1941), English football player (Everton)
- George Dobson (footballer, born 1897) (1897–1950), English footballer (Barnsley, Norwich City and Rotherham County)
- George Dobson (footballer, born 1949) (1949–2007), English football player (Brentford)
- George Dobson (footballer, born 1997), English football player (Wrexham)
- George Edward Dobson (1848–1895), zoologist, photographer and army surgeon
- George L. Dobson (1851–1919), American politician
- George Dobson (surveyor) (1840–1866), New Zealand surveyor and engineer
