= Les Thomas (rugby) =

Wales dual-code international rugby footballer

Personal information
- Full name: Leslie M. Thomas
- Born: unknown Wales

Playing information

Rugby union
Club
Years	Team	Pld	T	G	FG	P
	Llanelli RFC
Representative
Years	Team	Pld	T	G	FG	P
1945–46	Wales XV

Rugby league
- Position: Second-row
Club
Years	Team	Pld	T	G	FG	P
1946–49	Oldham	58	19	17		91
Representative
Years	Team	Pld	T	G	FG	P
1947	Wales	5	0	0	0	0
1947	Great Britain	1	0	0	0	0

Leslie "Les" M. Thomas (birth year unknown) is a Welsh former rugby union, and professional rugby league footballer who played in the 1940s. He played representative level rugby union (RU) for Wales XV, and at club level for Llanelli RFC, and representative level rugby league (RL) for Great Britain and Wales, and at club level for Oldham, as a second-row.

== International honours ==
Les Thomas represented Wales XV (RU) while at Oldham (RL) in the 'Victory International' non-Test match(es) between December 1945 and April 1946, and won caps for Wales (RL) while at Oldham in 1947 5-caps, and won a cap for Great Britain (RL) while at Oldham in 1947 New Zealand.

Six rugby league footballers represented Wales XV (RU) while at rugby league clubs, they were; Tyssul Griffiths, Elwyn Gwyther, Gomer Hughes, Hugh Lloyd-Davies, Harold Thomas, and Leslie Thomas.

Gomer Hughes, and Harold Thomas had previously won Wales (RU) caps, but the other footballers hadn't, and having already changed to the rugby league code they were unable to do so, but Tyssul Griffiths, Elwyn Gwyther, Leslie Thomas, did go on to win Wales (RL) caps.
