= 1954–55 Lancashire Cup =

- Structure: Regional knockout championship
- Teams: 16
- Winners: Barrow
- Runners-up: Oldham

The 1954–55 Lancashire Cup was the forty-second occasion on which English rugby league's Lancashire Cup competition had been held.
This year, the first time for many years save a new name on the trophy. Barrow changed codes to rugby league in 1897, were promoted into the league for season 1900–01 and have taken part in every one of the Lancashire Cup competitions since their inception in 1905, and now finally, almost 50 years later, they won the trophy by beating Oldham in the final by the score of 12–2.
The match was played at Station Road, Pendlebury (historically in the county of Lancashire). The attendance was 25,204 and receipts were £4,603.

== Background ==
This year saw the entry on new league members Blackpool Borough, and this together with the invitation to juniors, Lancashire Amateurs brought the total number of clubs to a full complement of 16.
For the first time in the competition, there was no need to have any byes or “blank/dummy” fixtures.
The same pre-war fixture format was retained, but, as mentioned, for the first time without any bye or dummy” fixtures.
And for the first time since the outbreak of war in 1939, the two-legged fixtures were abolished, resulting in the competition being played on a knock-out basis.

== Competition and results ==
=== Round 1 ===
Involved 8 matches (with no bye or “blank” fixture) and 16 clubs

Game No	Fixture date	Home team	Score	Away team	Venue	Att	Rec	Notes	Ref
1	Sat 11 Sep 1954	Blackpool Borough	5-9	Belle Vue Rangers	St Anne's Road Greyhound Stadium			1 2	
2	Sat 11 Sep 1954	Leigh	21-10	Wigan	Kirkhall Lane				
3	Sat 11 Sep 1954	Oldham	57-17	Lancashire Amateurs	Watersheddings			3	
4	Sat 11 Sep 1954	Liverpool City	6-3	Salford	Mill Yard, Knotty Ash				
5	Sat 11 Sep 1954	Rochdale Hornets	10-13	Barrow	Athletic Grounds				
6	Sat 11 Sep 1954	St. Helens	27-6	Whitehaven	Knowsley Road	13,600			
7	Sat 11 Sep 1954	Widnes	16-13	Warrington	Naughton Park				
8	Sat 11 Sep 1954	Workington Town	27-0	Swinton	Borough Park				

=== Round 2 - quarterfinals ===
Involved 4 matches (with no bye) and 8 clubs

Game No	Fixture date	Home team	Score	Away team	Venue	Att	Rec	Notes	Ref
1	Mon 20 Sep 1954	Belle Vue Rangers	9-37	Leigh	Belle Vue Stadium			4	
2	Mon 20 Sep 1954	Oldham	20-9	St. Helens	Watersheddings	16,000			
3	Wed 22 Sep 1954	Liverpool City	8-11	Workington Town	Mill Yard, Knotty Ash				
4	Thu 23 Sep 1954	Barrow	36-0	Widnes	Craven Park				

=== Round 3 – semifinals ===
Involved 2 matches and 4 clubs

Game No	Fixture date	Home team	Score	Away team	Venue	Att	Rec	Notes	Ref
1	Wed 29 Sep 1954	Leigh	2-7	Barrow	Kirkhall Lane				
2	Thu 30 Sep 1954	Workington Town	13-20	Oldham	Borough Park				

=== Final ===
Game No	Fixture date	Home team	Score	Away team	Venue	Att	Rec	Notes	Ref
	Saturday 23 October 1954	Barrow	12-2	Oldham	Station Road	25,204	£4,603	5	

==== Teams and scorers ====
Barrow	No.	Oldham
	Teams	
Colin Poole	1	Bernard Ganley
Derek Hinchley	2	Dick Cracknell
Phil Jackson	3	Roland Barrow
Dennis Goodwin	4	Alan Davies
Frank Castle	5	Terry O'Grady
Willie Horne (c)	6	Frank Daley
Ted Toohey	7	Frank Pitchford
Les Belshaw	8	Harry Ogden
Vince McKeating	9	Jack Keith
Frank Barton	10	Ken Jackson
JackGrundy	11	Charlie Winslade
Reg Parker	12	Sid Little
Bill Healey	13	Bryn Goldswain
star winger James 'Gentleman Jim' Lewthwaite injured and missed this game	note	
12	score	2
10	HT	2
	Scorers	
	Tries	
	T	
	Goals	
	G	
	G	
	Drop Goals	
	DG	
Referee		

Scoring - Try = three (3) points - Goal = two (2) points - Drop goal = two (2) points

=== The road to success ===
First round
Blackpool Borough	5
Belle Vue Rangers	9
Leigh	21
Wigan	10
Rochdale Hornets	10
Barrow	13
Widnes	16
Warrington	13
Liverpool City	6
Salford	3
Workington Town	27
Swinton	0
Oldham	57
Lancashire Amateurs	17
St. Helens	27
Whitehaven	6

Second round
Belle Vue Rangers	9
Leigh	37
Barrow	36
Widnes	0
Liverpool City	8
Workington Town	11
Oldham	20
St. Helens	9

Semifinals
Leigh	2
Barrow	7
Workington Town	13
Oldham	20

Final
Barrow	12
Oldham	2

== Notes and comments ==
1 * This season saw, for the first time ever, a full 16 clubs taking part and also a return to a knock-out tournament in ll rounds.
2 * The first Lancashire Cup match played by the new club Blackpool Borough and on this, their first ground
3 * Lancashire Amateurs were a junior (or amateur) club from Lancashire
4 * The last game played by this founding club. At the end of the season they folded
5 * Station Road was the home ground of Swinton from 1929 to 1932 and at its peak was one of the finest rugby league grounds in the country and it boasted a capacity of 60,000. The actual record attendance was for the Challenge Cup semi-final on 7 April 1951 when 44,621 watched Wigan beat Warrington 3-2

== See also ==
- 1954–55 Northern Rugby Football League season
- Rugby league county cups
