= Elwyn Gwyther =

GB & Wales dual-code rugby international footballer

Personal information
- Full name: Elwyn Gwyther
- Born: 8 March 1921 Gower Peninsula district, Wales, United Kingdom
- Died: 21 March 1996 (aged 75)

Playing information

Rugby union
- Position: Prop
Club
Years	Team	Pld	T	G	FG	P
19??–46	Llanelli RFC
Representative
Years	Team	Pld	T	G	FG	P
1945–46	Wales XV

Rugby league
- Position: Prop
Club
Years	Team	Pld	T	G	FG	P
1947–52	Belle Vue Rangers
1952–54	Leeds
1954–55	Belle Vue Rangers
	Total	0	0	0	0	0
Representative
Years	Team	Pld	T	G	FG	P
1947–53	Wales	16	2	0	0	6
1947–51	Great Britain	6	1	0	0	3

Elwyn Gwyther (8 March 1921 - 21 March 1996) was a Welsh rugby union and professional rugby league footballer who played in the 1940s and 1950s. He played representative level rugby union (RU) for Wales XV, and at club level for Llanelli RFC, as a prop, and representative level rugby league (RL) for Great Britain and Wales, and at club level for Belle Vue Rangers and Leeds, as a prop.

== Background ==
Elwyn Gwyther's birth was registered in Gower Peninsula district, Wales.

== Playing career ==
=== Club career ===
Gwyther played prop in Belle Vue Rangers' 7–10 defeat by Wigan in the 1947 Lancashire Cup Final during the 1947–48 season at Wilderspool Stadium, Warrington on Saturday 1 November 1947.

Gwyther was signed by Leeds in October 1952. In September 1954, he returned to Belle Vue Rangers.

=== International honours ===
Elwyn Gwyther represented Wales XV (RU) while at Llanelli RFC in the 'Victory International' non-Test match(es) between December 1945 and April 1946, and won caps for Wales (RL) while at Belle Vue Rangers, and Leeds 1947–1953 15-caps, and won caps for Great Britain (RL) while at Belle Vue Rangers in 1947 against New Zealand (2 matches), in 1950 against Australia (3 matches); and in 1951 against New Zealand.

Six rugby league footballers represented Wales XV (RU) while at rugby league clubs, they were; Tyssul Griffiths, Elwyn Gwyther, Gomer Hughes, Hugh Lloyd-Davies, Harold Thomas and Leslie Thomas.

Gomer Hughes, and Harold Thomas had previously won Wales (RU) caps, but the other footballers hadn't, and having already changed to the rugby league code they were unable to do so, but Tyssul Griffiths, Elwyn Gwyther, Leslie Thomas, did go on to win Wales (RL) caps.
