= Frederick French =

Frederick French may refer to:

- Frederick John French (1847–1924), Ontario lawyer and political figure
- Fred F. French (Frederick Fillmore French, 1883–1936), real estate developer
- Freddie French (Frederick Thomas James French, 1911–1989), New Zealand rugby union and rugby league footballer
