= Emily Otis =

American woman celebrated for her beauty (1807–1836)

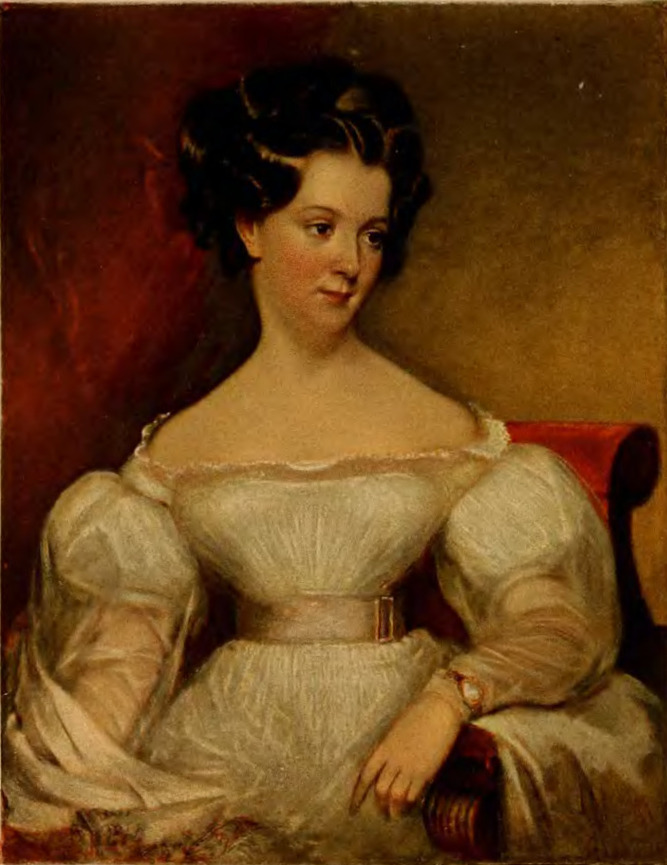
Portrait by Chester Harding (1830)

Emily Otis (née Marshall; 1807–1836), familiarly known as "The Beautiful Emily Marshall" and "The Belle of Boston", was an American woman celebrated for her beauty, grace, dignity, and feminine charm.

== Personal life ==
She married William Foster Otis in May 1831 and died in 1836, leaving two daughters and an infant son.

== Fame ==
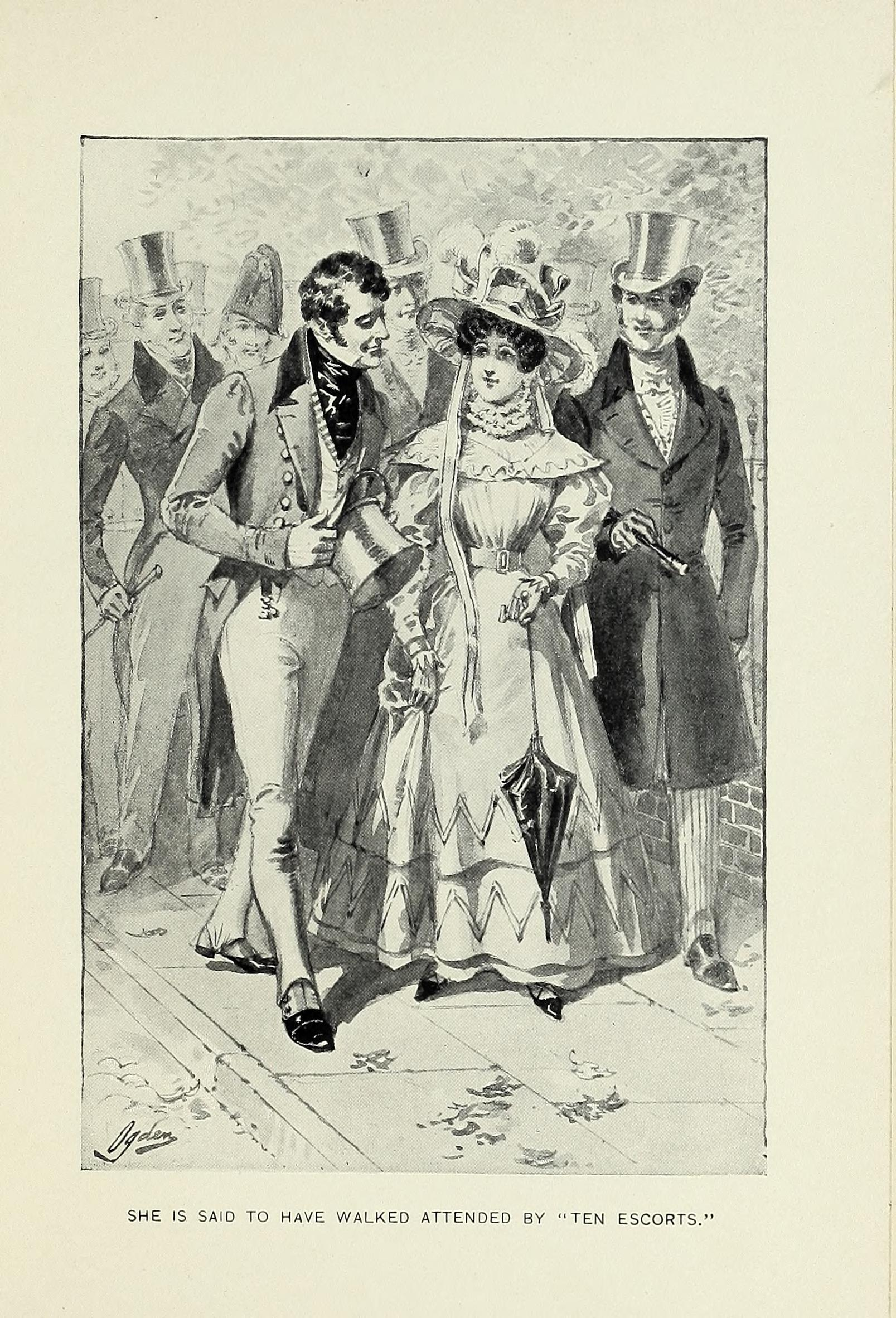
Illustration by H. A. Ogden (1901)

"Emily Marshall as completely filled the ideal of the lovely and feminine, as did Webster the ideal of the intellectual and the masculine," Josiah Quincy, a native of the same State, wrote of her, adding that though superlatives were intended only for the use of the very young, not even the cooling influences of half a century enabled him to avoid them in speaking of her.

Daniel Webster, upon one occasion during his residence in Boston, entered the old Federal Street Theatre and was hailed with cheers. A few minutes later. Emily Marshall appeared in her box, whereupon the entire audience rose as one man and offered her the same homage it had bestowed upon Webster.

== Sources ==
- Brooks, Geraldine (1901). Dames and Daughters of the Young Republic. New York: Thomas Y. Crowell & Co. pp. 269–287.
- Peacock, Virginia Tatnall (1901). Famous American Belles of the Nineteenth Century. Philadelphia & London: J. B. Lippincott Co. pp. 90–101.
