= Stephen Rae =

Stephen Rae may refer to:

- Stephen Rae (composer) (born 1961), Australian composer, musician and actor
- Stephen Rae (editor) (born 1960s), Irish news editor
- Stephen Rae (footballer) (born 1952), Australian rules footballer
- Steve Rae, English rugby player, see List of Barrow Raiders players

== See also ==
- Stephen Ray (disambiguation)
- Stephen Rea (born 1946), Irish film and stage actor
