= Hugh Lloyd-Davies =

Wales international rugby union & league footballer

Personal information
- Full name: Rheinallt Hugh Lloyd-Davies
- Born: 1925 Ammanford, Wales
- Died: 1986 (aged 60–61) Islington, England

Playing information

Rugby union
- Position: Fullback
Club
Years	Team	Pld	T	G	FG	P
	Ammanford RFC
1945–47	Cambridge University
	Harlequin F.C.
	Total	0	0	0	0	0
Representative
Years	Team	Pld	T	G	FG	P
1945–46	Wales XV

Rugby league
- Position: Fullback
Club
Years	Team	Pld	T	G	FG	P
1950	Barrow	5

Rheinallt Hugh Lloyd-Davies (1925–1986) was a Welsh rugby union and professional rugby league footballer who played in the 1940s. He played representative level rugby union (RU) for Wales XV, at university for Cambridge University RFC, and at club level for Ammanford RFC, as a fullback, and club level rugby league (RL) for Barrow, as a fullback.

== Personal history ==
Lloyd-Davies was born in Tycroes near Ammanford, Wales in 1925 as Rheinallt Lloyd Hughes Davies and christened the next year. His father was a bus conductor in the firm Williams and Rees, though his family had a substantial interest in the company through his mother's side (née Rees). Known as a child as Hugh Lloyd Davies, he lived with his grandparents whose house was attached to the bus firm's garage. His parents, and siblings Heddwyn and Mair, lived in the house opposite.

He was educated at Amman Valley County School and represented the Welsh Schools at rugby. He married Mary Michael a school teacher. After leaving school he joined the RAF and served during the Second World War. Before enlisting he went on a course to Trinity Hall, Cambridge, and was promised a place at the college on completing his war service. At Trinity Hall he read Law and intended to become a barrister. The journalist Alan Watkins, who also attended Amman Valley County School and was an undergraduate at Queens' College. described Lloyd-Davies as a terrible snob, stating that Lloyd-Davies added the hyphen to his surname and described himself as coming from 'an old Carmarthenshire county family' in an attempt to improve his social status. A womaniser and carouser, Lloyd-Davies was often in trouble with the university.

On leaving Trinity Hall he entered Gray's Inn, though he was never called to the bar, and lived for a while in London where he turned out for local team Harlequin F.C., though after running up debts he needed to be bailed out by the club's president, and local MP, Sir Wavell Wakefield.

In 1951 he was imprisoned after he fraudulently obtained a diamond ring and gold cufflinks which he later pawned. He was sentenced to nine months and it was stated that he was also receiving treatment for issues connected to alcohol. He was arrested and imprisoned a second time, after stealing an overcoat from Gray's Inn library. On his release he returned briefly to Tycroes before heading back to London. There he passed himself off as a colonel and he ended up working as a gardener for Islington council and for a period was homeless. He is said to have died in Islington, London in 1986.

== Rugby career ==
Lloyd-Davies first came to note as a rugby union player as a youth playing for Wales Schools. He joined local club Ammanford RFC, before matriculating to Trinity Hall and representing Cambridge University RFC. He played in one Varsity match, converting two penalties to score all the match points in a 6–0 Cambridge victory. He is reported to have turned out for London Welsh RFC and then Harlequins while living in London.

Hugh Lloyd-Davies represented Wales XV (RU) while at Cambridge in the 'Victory International' non-Test match(es) between December 1945 and April 1946.

Five rugby league footballers represented Wales XV (RU) while at rugby league clubs, they were; Tyssul Griffiths, Elwyn Gwyther, Gomer Hughes, Harold Thomas and Leslie Thomas.

Gomer Hughes, and Harold Thomas had previously won Wales (RU) caps, but the other footballers hadn't, and having already changed to the rugby league code they were unable to do so, but Tyssul Griffiths, Elwyn Gwyther, Leslie Thomas, did go on to win Wales caps under the league code.

In 1950, now working as a school teacher, Lloyd-Davies turned up at Barrow rugby league club and after showing his kicking skills was reportedly signed for £1,000 becoming the first Cambridge Blue to turn professional. He played just five games before disappearing, the story being reported in the national press. Lloyd-Davies had actually headed to France where he signed for a French league team, playing just one game before leaving.

== Bibliography ==
- Watkins, Alan (2001). A Short Walk Down Fleet Street: From Beaverbrook to Boycott. London: Duckworth. ISBN 0-7156-3143-8.
