= Harold Thomas (rugby, born 1914) =

Wales dual-code international rugby footballer

Personal information
- Full name: Harold Watkin Thomas
- Born: 19 February 1914 Neath, Wales
- Died: 10 December 1989 (aged 75) Neath, Wales

Playing information

Rugby union
- Position: Lock
Club
Years	Team	Pld	T	G	FG	P
≤1936–≥37	Neath RFC
Representative
Years	Team	Pld	T	G	FG	P
1936–37	Wales	6	0	0	0	0
1945–46	Wales XV

Rugby league
- Position: Second-row
Club
Years	Team	Pld	T	G	FG	P
1937–45	Salford	119	6	0	0	18
Representative
Years	Team	Pld	T	G	FG	P
1938–39	Wales	2	1	0	0	3

Harold Watkin Thomas (19 February 1914 – 10 December 1989) was a Welsh dual-code international rugby union, and professional rugby league footballer who played in the 1930s and 1940s. He played representative level rugby union (RU) for Wales and Wales XV, and at club level for his native town of Neath, as a lock, and representative level rugby league (RL) for Wales, and at club level for Salford, as a second-row.

== Background ==
Harold Thomas was born in Neath, Wales in 1914. His father Tom played rugby for Neath, and his brother David was also capped for Wales. A metal worker by trade Thomas served as a regimental sergeant major in the maritime branch of the Royal Artillery during the Second World War. He saw action in the Atlantic, Russian and Indian waters, and at one time survived the sinking of his ship by a Japanese submarine. Thomas died aged 75 in Neath, Wales.

== Playing career ==
=== International honours ===
Harold Thomas won caps for Wales (RU) while at Neath RFC in 1936 against England, Scotland, and Ireland, and in 1937 against England, Scotland, and Ireland, represented Wales XV (RU) while at Salford (RL) in the 'Victory International' non-Test match(es) between December 1945 and April 1946, and won caps for Wales (RL) while at Salford 1938...1939 2-caps.

Six rugby league footballers represented Wales XV (RU) while at rugby league clubs, they were; Tyssul Griffiths, Elwyn Gwyther, Gomer Hughes, Hugh Lloyd-Davies, Harold Thomas, and Leslie Thomas.

Gomer Hughes, and Harold Thomas had previously won Wales (RU) caps, but the other footballers had not, and having already changed to the rugby league code they were unable to do so, Tyssul Griffiths, Elwyn Gwyther, Leslie Thomas, did go on to win Wales (RL) caps, but Hugh Lloyd-Davies and W. E. "Billy" Williams won neither Wales (RU) nor Wales (RL) caps.

=== Challenge Cup Final appearances ===
Harold Thomas played at second-row in Salford's 7–4 victory over Barrow in the 1938 Challenge Cup Final during the 1937–38 season at Wembley Stadium, London, in front of a crowd of 51,243.

=== County Cup Final appearances ===
Harold Thomas played at second-row in Salford's 7–10 defeat by Wigan in the 1938 Lancashire Cup Final during the 1938–39 season at Station Road, Swinton on Saturday 22 October 1938.
