= Gomer Hughes =

Wales dual-code rugby international footballer

Personal information
- Full name: Gomer Hughes
- Born: 13 May 1910 Neath, Glamorgan, Wales
- Died: 14 November 1974 (aged 64) Salford, England

Playing information

Rugby union
- Position: Lock
Club
Years	Team	Pld	T	G	FG	P
≤1934–≥34	Penarth RFC
Representative
Years	Team	Pld	T	G	FG	P
1934	Wales	3	0	0	0	0
1945–46	Wales XV		0	0	0	0

Rugby league
- Position: Prop, Second-row
Club
Years	Team	Pld	T	G	FG	P
1934–47	Swinton	293	16	0	0	48
Representative
Years	Team	Pld	T	G	FG	P
1935–40	Wales	3

Gomer Hughes (13 May 1910 – 14 November 1974) was a Welsh dual-code international rugby union, and professional rugby league footballer who played in the 1930s and 1940s. He played representative level rugby union (RU) for Wales and Wales XV, and at club level for Tonmawr RFC and Penarth RFC, as a lock, and representative level rugby league (RL) for Wales, and at club level for Swinton, as a prop, or second-row.

== Background ==
Hughes was born in Neath, Glamorgan, and he died aged 64 in Salford, Greater Manchester, England.

== Playing career ==
=== International honours ===
Gomer Hughes represented Wales XV (RU) while at Swinton (RL) in the 'Victory International' non-Test match(es) between December 1945 and April 1946, won 3 caps for Wales (RU) in 1935–1940 while at Penarth RFC (RU) in 1934 England, Scotland, and Ireland, and won caps for Wales (RL) while at Swinton (RL).

Six rugby league footballers represented Wales XV (RU) while at rugby league clubs, they were; Tyssul Griffiths, Elwyn Gwyther, Gomer Hughes, Hugh Lloyd-Davies, Harold Thomas and Leslie Thomas.

Gomer Hughes, and Harold Thomas had previously won Wales (RU) caps, but the other footballers hadn't, and having already changed to the rugby league code they were unable to do so, but Tyssul Griffiths, Elwyn Gwyther, Leslie Thomas, did go on to win Wales (RL) caps.
