= 1954–55 Challenge Cup =

Rugby league competition

- Duration: 5 rounds
- Winners: Barrow
- Runners-up: Workington Town
- Lance Todd Trophy: Jack Grundy

The 1954–55 Challenge Cup was the 54th staging of rugby league's oldest knockout competition, the Challenge Cup.

== First round ==
Date	Team one	Score one	Team two	Score two
12 Feb	Batley	2	St Helens	15
12 Feb	Bradford Northern	9	Warrington	4
12 Feb	Bramley	4	Halifax	9
12 Feb	Dewsbury	8	Barrow	11
12 Feb	Featherstone Rovers	39	Belle Vue Rangers	6
12 Feb	Hull Kingston Rovers	7	York	6
12 Feb	Hunslet	43	Whitehaven	10
12 Feb	Keighley	17	Blackpool	8
12 Feb	Leeds	8	Huddersfield	3
12 Feb	Leigh	19	Doncaster	8
12 Feb	Liverpool	6	Widnes	3
12 Feb	Oldham	5	Wigan	2
12 Feb	Rochdale Hornets	11	Wakefield Trinity	9
12 Feb	Salford	13	Castleford	5
12 Feb	Swinton	8	Hull FC	16
12 Feb	Workington Town	43	Dewsbury Celtic	0

== Second round ==
Date	Team one	Score one	Team two	Score two
05 Mar	Bradford Northern	2	Featherstone Rovers	7
05 Mar	Hull FC	4	Halifax	0
05 Mar	Hull Kingston Rovers	2	Hunslet	33
05 Mar	Keighley	2	St Helens	3
05 Mar	Leigh	5	Oldham	3
05 Mar	Rochdale Hornets	13	Liverpool	5
05 Mar	Salford	0	Barrow	13
05 Mar	Workington Town	13	Leeds	7

== Quarterfinals ==
Date	Team one	Score one	Team two	Score two
19 Mar	Hull FC	5	Hunslet	7
19 Mar	Leigh	9	Featherstone Rovers	13
19 Mar	Rochdale Hornets	2	Barrow	15
19 Mar	Workington Town	14	St Helens	4

== Semifinals ==
Date	Team one	Score one	Team two	Score two
02 Apr	Barrow	9	Hunslet	6
02 Apr	Featherstone Rovers	2	Workington Town	13

== Final ==
This is the only all-Cumbrian Final to date, although its occurrence predates the creation of Cumbria by 20 years. Barrow beat Workington Town 21-12 in the final played at Wembley before a crowd of 66,513. Captained by former Great Britain skipper Willie Horne, this was Barrow’s first Challenge Cup final win, although have been runners-up on four other occasions. Jack Grundy, Barrow's Second-row was awarded the Lance Todd Trophy for man-of-the-match.

30 April 1955

Barrow	21 – 12	Workington Town
Tries: McKeating, Goodwin, Castle; Goals: Horne (5); Drop goals: Horne		Tries: Faulder, Gibson; Goals: Paskins (3)

Wembley, London
Attendance: 66,513 (HT 2-2)
Player of the Match: Jack Grundy

1	Clive Best
2	Jimmy Lewthwaite
3	Phil Jackson
4	Dennis Goodwin
5	Frank Castle
6	Willie Horne
7	Ted Toohey
8	Les Belshaw
9	Vince McKeating
10	Frank Barton
11	Jack Grundy
12	Reg Parker
13	Bill Healey
Coach:
Frank Hill

1	Joe Vickers
2	Ike Southward
3	Tony Paskins
4	Eppie Gibson
5	Ken Faulder
6	Bill Wookey
7	Sol Roper
8	Jimmy Hayton
9	Bill Lymer
10	Andy Key
11	Brian Edgar
12	Rupert Mudge
13	Billy Ivison
Coach:
Jim Brough
