= James Cumberbatch =

England international rugby league footballer

- Senior Service Cigarette card featuring James Cumberbatch

Personal information
- Full name: James Haywood Cumberbatch
- Born: 9 February 1909 Liverpool, England
- Died: first ¼ 1972 (aged c. 62–63) Northumberland South district, England

Playing information
- Position: Wing
Club
Years	Team	Pld	T	G	FG	P
≤1937–≥37	Broughton Rangers
≤1938–≥38	Newcastle
	Total	0	0	0	0	0
Representative
Years	Team	Pld	T	G	FG	P
	Lancashire
1937–38	England	2	3	0	0	9
- Relatives: Val Cumberbatch (brother)

James Haywood Cumberbatch (9 February 1909 – first ¼ 1972) was an English professional rugby league footballer who played in the 1930s. He played at representative level for England, and at club level for Broughton Rangers and Newcastle, as a wing.

== Background ==
James Cumberbatch was born in Liverpool, Lancashire, and his death aged c. 62–63 was registered in Northumberland South district.

== International honours ==
Cumberbatch won caps for England while at Broughton Rangers in 1937 against France, and while at Newcastle in 1938 against Wales, and was the only player to win an England cap while at the now defunct Newcastle rugby league club.

== Personal life ==
Cumberbatch was the brother of the rugby league footballer Val Cumberbatch.
