= Ivor Bennett =

Wales international rugby union & league footballer

Personal information
- Full name: Ivor Bennett
- Born: 16 June 1913 Aberkenfig, Wales
- Died: 16 June 2003 (aged 90) Neath, Wales

Playing information

Rugby union
- Position: Prop
Club
Years	Team	Pld	T	G	FG	P
≤1937–37	Aberavon RFC
Representative
Years	Team	Pld	T	G	FG	P
1937	Wales	1	0	0	0	0

Rugby league
- Position: Second-row
Club
Years	Team	Pld	T	G	FG	P
1937–46	Warrington	73	13	0	0	39

Ivor Bennett (16 June 1913 – 16 June 2003) was a Welsh rugby union, and professional rugby league footballer who played in the 1930s and 1940s. He played representative level rugby union (RU) for Wales, and at club level for Aberavon RFC, as a prop, and club level rugby league (RL) for Warrington, as a second-row.

== Background ==
Ivor Bennett was born in Aberkenfig, Wales, and he died aged 90 in Port Talbot, Wales.

== Playing career ==
=== International honours ===
Ivor Bennett won a cap for Wales (RU) while at Aberavon RFC in 1937 against Ireland.

=== County Cup Final appearances ===
Ivor Bennett played at second-row in Warrington's 8–4 victory over Barrow in the 1937–38 Lancashire Cup Final during the 1937–38 season at Central Park, Wigan on Saturday 23 October 1937.

== Club career ==
Bennett made his début for Warrington on Saturday 28 August 1937, and he played his last match for Warrington on Saturday 9 November 1946.
