= Bryn Goldswain =

Wales international rugby league player (1922–1983)

Personal information
- Full name: Brynley Vernon Goldswain
- Born: 3 August 1922 Merthyr Tydfil, Wales
- Died: 24 April 1983 (aged 60)

Playing information

Rugby union
Club
Years	Team	Pld	T	G	FG	P
193?	Neath RFC

Rugby league
- Position: Second-row
Club
Years	Team	Pld	T	G	FG	P
≤1947–49	Hull Kingston Rovers	122	19	9	0	75
1949–56	Oldham	228	21	142	0	347
1957	Blackpool Borough	3	0	0	0	0
1959–60	Doncaster	4	0	0	0	0
	Total	357	40	151	0	422
Representative
Years	Team	Pld	T	G	FG	P
1947–53	Wales	16	1	4	0	11
1955	Other Nationalities	1	2	0	0	6

Brynley Vernon Goldswain (3 August 1922 – 24 April 1983) was a Welsh professional rugby league footballer who played in the 1940s and 1950s. He played at representative level for Wales and Other Nationalities, and at club level for Hull Kingston Rovers, Oldham, and Doncaster, as a second-row.

== Biography ==
Goldswain won caps for Wales while at Hull Kingston Rovers, and Oldham 1947–1953 16-caps, and won a cap for Other Nationalities while at Oldham in 1955.

About Goldswain's time, there was Oldham's 2-12 defeat by Barrow in the 1954–55 Lancashire Cup Final during the 1954–55 season at Station Road, Swinton on Saturday 23 October 1954, and the 10-3 victory over St. Helens in the 1956–57 Lancashire Cup Final during the 1956–57 season at Station Road, Swinton on Saturday 20 October 1956.

Goldswain's taught boys' Physical education at Hollins Secondary Modern School, Lyndhurst Road, Oldham circa 1952-3.

Mr Goldswain became a staff member at Bryn Estyn Approved School in Wrexham, subsequently becoming temporary headmaster following the death of the then headmaster Mr Burton and the deputy headmaster Gordon Wort. He became deputy headmaster upon the appointment of Mr Arnold as headmaster.

Goldswain died on 24 April 1983 at the age of 60.
