= Tycroes =

Village in Carmarthenshire, Wales

Coordinates: 51.778°N 04.025°W

Tycroes: Welsh: Tŷ-croes
- Location within Carmarthenshire
- Population: 2,438 (2011 census)
- OS grid reference: SN608107
- Community: Llanedi
- Principal area: Carmarthenshire
- Preserved county: Dyfed
- Country: Wales
- Sovereign state: United Kingdom
- Post town: Ammanford
- Postcode district: SA18
- Dialling code: 01269
- Police: Dyfed-Powys
- Fire: Mid and West Wales
- Ambulance: Welsh
- UK Parliament: Llanelli
- Senedd Cymru – Welsh Parliament: Llanelli

Tycroes (Welsh: Tŷ-croes) is a village in Carmarthenshire, Wales. As measured in the 2011 Census, the population of Tycroes electoral ward was 2,438 persons (50.5% male, 49.5% female).

At the 2011 Census all the population was counted in Llanedi community. The built-up area with Capel Hendre had a population of 3,752.

The village forms the westernmost fringe of the Amman valley and rests mainly on the anthracite coal measures, part of the South Wales coalfield. It straddles the A483 Swansea to Manchester Trunk road and has a linear village structure, having developed substantially along roads which meet at the centre of the village. The trunk road is in the main artery from north to south of the country and is connected to the M4 motorway network which affords transportation from mainland Europe to Ireland. The rail link at nearby Pantyffynnon contributes a daily service to Swansea, Llanelli and Shrewsbury.

Topographically, the village slopes in a general south west to north east direction thus affording panoramic views of the Black Mountain in the east with its peaks - Tair Cairn 482 m, Garreg Lwyd 616 m and behind them Fan Hir 802 m. To the south there are views from Betws Mountain to Mynydd y Gwair above Garnswllt. To the north there is the limestone ridge from Llandybie to Upper Tumble.

The Fferws brook which flows from the west to the east divides the local authority administrative areas between Llanedi and Llandybie Community Councils. The name Fferws is possibly derived from the fact that the river flows over mineral rocks which contain iron ore (ferrous being the chemical name for iron). Others say it derives from a delightful house that once stood on its banks - "fairhouse".

== History ==
Pre-nineteenth century the area was sparsely populated owing to the agricultural land being poor of quality. The best land was found to be along the banks of the River Loughor where two properties of notable character stood.

The first is Plas Mawr also known Plas Llanedy and Cwrt y Ceidrim. The main portion of the house dates from the 16th century. This was the seat of the Penry family and their descendants, Jones. William Penry and his son Henry were High Sheriffs in 1736 and 1756 respectively. The Penry family descended from Bleddyn ap Maenarch and were at Cwrt y Ceidrim in the Elizabethan era.

In 1876, Plas Mawr Estate nearly 850 acres (3.4 km^{2}) was offered for sale. Later the Buckley family acquired it and in 1921 they offered for sale the freehold farm 129 acres (0.52 km^{2}).

A field belonging to the farm was called Ynys y Capel and, according to tradition, a chapel had once stood there; another tradition states that a 'tunnel' connected the mansion to Carreg Cennen Castle. It is also rumoured that Oliver Cromwell rested there during his campaign in the principality during the Second English Civil War in Wales.

Today Plas Mawr has now been restored and is the family home of the Wiley and Waters family.

The other property is Erw Wasted located three-quarters of a mile from Plas Mawr. This was the home of the Price family from the 17th century. Francis Price was the High Sheriff in 1723. Later in the 18th century the price family moved to Plas Newydd in Llanedy.

The village owes its existence to the development of the coal mining industry during the 19th century. A few shallow shafts and drift was constructed to the rear of Bethesda Chapel at Mynydd Bach. Mynydd Bach was the former name for the village or hamlet. A tramway ran from the mine along Pontardulais road, part of Tycroes road and Heol Brown to the Brown Colliery at Waun y Wernos beyond Heol Brown and then to the sidings of the old Wernos Colliery.

The placename "Tycroes" is derived from the cottage or house (Ty) that stood at the crossroads, which is now the village square. In 1900 the village consisted of less than 100 homes but today there are about 800. The population at the turn of the century was approximately 400 and today is 2,122.

Since 1965 and especially during the house building boom of the early 70s, housing development erupted spreading its wings in all directions and this changed the face of the village. Frontage development took place along the existing roads and private housing estates at Penygarn Road, Pontardulais Road and the lower end of Tycroes Road. This trend reflects Tycroes's attractive situation.

Mining is no longer a major source of employment. Local employment opportunities are varied and limited but is improving with the continued extension of factory units at nearby Capel Hendre and Cross Hands Industrial estates.

== Education ==
From 1863 till 1904, primary education was provided at the local Church School, which is today used as the Church Hall. In 1904 the present county Primary School was built and was then known as the Board school. It is now known as Ysgol Tycroes, it is a mixed gender school, and only teaches in English, though Welsh is taught in the curriculum and spoken widely.

== Places of worship ==
There were no places of worship in the village pre-1870 and people had to walk either to St. Edith's Church in Llanedi or the chapels in Ammanford (then known as Cross Inn) or to Capel Hendre and Saron. It was in 1876 that the first chapels were built; Moriah (Congregational) was the 'daughter' of Christian Temple Ammanford and Caersalem (Calvinistic Methodist) was the 'daughter' of Capel Hendre. Then at the earlier part of this century Bethesda (Baptist) was built in 1913 and building work commenced at St. Edmund's Church on 29 January 1914. Later in 1932 the Neuadd Efengylu, locally known as the Mission Hall or Gospel Hall, was opened.

== Notable people ==
- Hugh Lloyd-Davies (1926–1986), a Welsh rugby union and professional rugby league footballer
- Alan Watkins (1933–2010), a British political columnist for over 50 years
- Adam Price (born 1968), politician, Leader of Plaid Cymru since 2018, brought up in Tycroes
- Aled Pugh (born May 1979), a Welsh actor, brought up in Tycroes

== Governance ==
A separate electoral ward in the same name still exists. The population of this ward at the 2011 Census was 2,438.

== Facilities ==
There are good facilities available at the village hall, church hall, and the Scout's hall for the social, cultural, community events and other functions. The Senior Citizens Association, St. Johns Ambulance Brigade, Local Charities Committee, Ysgol Feithrin are some of the institutions which are accommodated at these halls, not forgetting the Mobile Library which visits every Thursday between 9:30-12:30 at Pant y boblen car park. The village hall was originally built as a Billiards hall. It was later sold to the 'Urdd Gobaith Cymru' who later sold it to the Miners Welfare Association - and is today the village hall.

The rugby union club at Penygarn Road provides good recreational facilities for both children, youth and senior players and, over the years, has produced some fine rugby players who were honoured to represent their country. The rugby club Also provides the village with great entertainment including the now established annual music event Party on the Pitch.

Lately a football pitch has been provided by the County Council at Heol Brown where the public park is also located.

Tycroes RFC is also the host of the annual family fun day and musical event Party on the Pitch. Organised and run by a volunteer committee the event hosted 3,000 people in 2010. The event has welcomed 80's star Chesney Hawkes, 60's chart toppers the Animals and Spencer Davis and X Factor finalist Lucie Jones in recent years.

== Sources ==
- Carmarthenshire County Council - Tycroes stats
