= Edward Roffe Thompson =

English author and journalist

Edward Roffe Thompson, who wrote as E.T. Raymond or Edward Raymond Thompson, (27 December 1891 – 13 October 1973) was an English author and journalist. He was the editor of John Bull magazine and wrote a number of biographies of British political figures and celebrities. He wrote an early self-help book, The Human Machine: Secrets of Success (1925).

== Early life ==
Edward Thompson was born in Settle, Yorkshire, on 27 December 1891, the son of Edward Charles Thompson, a foreman store keeper. He received his higher education at the Victoria University of Manchester.

He married Caroline Alice (C. A.) Lejeune (1897–1973), a film reviewer for The Observer, in Chelsea in 1925 and they settled in Pinner Hill in Middlesex where they built a house on open fields. They had a son, the writer and broadcaster Anthony Lejeune (1928–2018). Edward was usually known as Roffe rather than Edward in private life.

== Career ==
Thompson wrote for and was the editor of John Bull magazine in succession to Horatio Bottomley. He produced a number of biographies of British political figures and celebrities, and an early self-help book, The Human Machine: Secrets of Success (1925).

== Death ==
Thompson died in Harrow, Middlesex, on 13 October 1973. His residence at the time of his death was Lane End, Hillside Road, Pinner. He left an estate of £32,735.

== Selected publications ==
- Uncensored Celebrities. T. Fisher Unwin, London, 1918.
- All & Sundry. T. Fisher Unwin, London, 1919.
- Mr Balfour: A Biography. Collins, London, 1920.
- Portraits of the Nineties. T. Fisher Unwin, London, 1921.
- Mr. Lloyd George: A Biography. W. Collins, 1922.
- The Man of Promise: Lord Rosebery: A Critical Study. London, c. 1923.
- Disraeli: The Alien Patriot. Hodder and Stoughton, London, 1925.
- The Human Machine: Secrets of Success. Mills & Boon, London, 1925.
- Portraits of the New Century: (The first ten years). Ernest Benn, London, 1928.
- Life's Secrets. The Human Machine. Second Series. Peppercorn Press, London, 1931.
