= 1937–38 Challenge Cup =

Rugby league knockout competition

- Duration: 5 Rounds
- Number of teams: 32
- Highest attendance: 51,243
- Winners: Salford
- Runners-up: Barrow

The 1937–38 Challenge Cup was the 38th staging of rugby league's oldest knockout competition, the Challenge Cup.

The final was contested by Salford and Barrow at Wembley in front of a crowd of 51,243. Salford won the match 7–4.

The trophy was presented by Australian Test cricketer Don Bradman.

== First round ==
Date	Team one	Score one	Team two	Score two
19 Feb	Barrow	83	Maryport	3
19 Feb	Bradford Northern	7	Featherstone Rovers	2
19 Feb	Bramley	23	Leigh	5
19 Feb	Castleford	18	Newcastle (UK)	9
19 Feb	Glass Houghton	2	Rochdale Hornets	50
19 Feb	Halifax	4	Warrington	4
19 Feb	Huddersfield	2	Broughton Rangers	0
19 Feb	Hull Kingston Rovers	0	Keighley	2
19 Feb	Leeds	27	Wigan	4
19 Feb	Liverpool	6	Hunslet	5
19 Feb	Oldham	7	Batley	8
19 Feb	St Helens Recs	11	Dewsbury	10
19 Feb	St Helens	39	Pendlebury Jnrs	0
19 Feb	Salford	38	Hull FC	2
19 Feb	Wakefield Trinity	7	Widnes	3
19 Feb	York	2	Swinton	12
23 Feb	Warrington	9	Halifax	16

== Second round ==
Date	Team one	Score one	Team two	Score two
12 Mar	Barrow	26	Bramley	4
12 Mar	Batley	8	Keighley	6
12 Mar	Castleford	18	St Helens	2
12 Mar	Halifax	5	Bradford Northern	5
12 Mar	Leeds	11	Huddersfield	7
12 Mar	Liverpool	3	Salford	11
12 Mar	St Helens Recs	18	Rochdale Hornets	10
12 Mar	Swinton	10	Wakefield Trinity	5
16 Mar	Bradford Northern	2	Halifax	10

== Quarterfinals ==
Date	Team one	Score one	Team two	Score two
26 Mar	Barrow	7	Leeds	5
26 Mar	Batley	3	Swinton	9
26 Mar	Castleford	7	Halifax	7
26 Mar	Salford	19	St Helens Recs	0
30 Mar	Halifax	11	Castleford	7

== Semifinals ==
Date	Team one	Score one	Team two	Score two
09 Apr	Barrow	4	Halifax	2
09 Apr	Salford	6	Swinton	0

== Final ==
7 May 1938

Salford	7 – 4	Barrow
Try: Gear; Goal: Risman (2)	Report	Goal: French, Little

Wembley, London
Attendance: 51,243
Referee: Frank Peel (Bradford)

FB	1	Harold Osbaldestin
RW	2	Barney Hudson
RC	3	Albert Gear
LC	4	Bob Brown
LW	5	Alan Edwards
SO	6	Gus Risman (c)
SH	7	Billy Watkins
PR	8	Billy Williams
HK	9	Bert Day
PR	10	Dai Davies
SR	11	Paddy Dalton
SR	12	Harold Thomas
LF	13	Jack Feetham
Coach:
Lance Todd

FB	1	Freddie French
RW	2	Val Cumberbatch
RC	3	John Higgin
LC	4	Des McDonnell
LW	5	Jim Thornburrow
SO	6	Ian Lloyd
SH	7	Billy Little
PR	8	Gordon Rawlings
HK	9	Danny McKeating
PR	10	Bill Skelly
SR	11	Alex Troup (c)
SR	12	Bob Ayres
LF	13	Alf Marklew
Coach:
