= Anthony Lejeune =

English writer, editor, and broadcaster (1928–2018)

- Born: 7 August 1928; Hendon, London, England
- Died: 3 March 2018 (aged 89); London, England
- Occupations: Writer, editor, broadcaster
- Relatives: Edward Roffe Thompson (father); Caroline Alice Lejeune (mother)

Edward Anthony Thompson (7 August 1928 – 3 March 2018), known as Anthony Lejeune, was an English writer, editor, and broadcaster. He was known for his weekly radio talk London Letter that was broadcast in South Africa for nearly 30 years and for his crime novels and writing about the history of London's gentleman's clubs. He also produced a number of political books written from a conservative point of view. He was described by The Times as "always out of period, a misfit in the modern world for whom the term 'young fogey' might have been invented".

== Early life and family ==
Anthony Lejeune was born in Hendon on 7 August 1928 to the journalist and editor Edward Roffe Thompson, and Caroline Alice Lejeune, a film reviewer for The Observer. He was educated at the Merchant Taylors' School, Northwood, and undertook his national service in the Royal Navy (March 1947 – June 1949), serving on HMS Ausonia and HMS Drake. In 1949, he went to the University of Oxford, where he won the Newman Exhibition in Greek and English at Balliol College. He graduated with a first class degree in 1951. He took his mother's surname but never legally changed his name. He had close female friends but never married.

== Career ==
Lejeune was reading for the bar when he was offered the job of deputy editor of the literary review magazine Time and Tide. He subsequently became the editor but left after the ownership of the magazine changed. He then worked at the Daily Express, and through Ian Fleming, got a job as the crime correspondent for The Sunday Times. He wrote a number of detective novels, six up to 1965 and three in the 1980s, and from 1953 reviewed detective stories for the Catholic weekly newspaper The Tablet, although he was not Catholic himself. He recorded a weekly radio talk titled London Letter for the South African Broadcasting Company for nearly 30 years. He wrote a weekly column for The Daily Telegraph colour magazine in the 1970s and 1980s and was the London correspondent for New York's conservative National Review for over 40 years.

Lejeune produced a number of political books which were written from a conservative point of view. He edited Enoch Powell's Income Tax at 4/3 In The £ and the collection The Case For South West Africa both of which were published by Tom Stacey. He also produced Shadow Over Britain – An Examination of Labour Party Policy and Socialist Leaders (1964) and Socialized Medicine: Showcase of Failure (1969). His best-remembered non-fiction is The Gentlemen's Clubs of London (1979) and White's: The First Three Hundred Years (1993) which drew on his knowledge of the London gentleman's club scene. He was a member of five such clubs which he described as "a peculiarly English institution".

In 1991 he edited a reader of his mother's film criticism and in 1998 he edited The Concise Dictionary of Foreign Quotations for Tom Stacey that was subsequently reissued in five different language volumes in 2007. He had an encyclopaedic knowledge of the novels of Rider Haggard.

== Later life ==
Lejeune was diagnosed with Parkinson's disease in 2010 and resigned from his five clubs. He died from complications of the disease on 3 March 2018 and received obituaries in The Times and The Daily Telegraph.

== Selected publications ==
=== Fiction ===
- Crowded and Dangerous. Macdonald, London, 1959.
- Mr Diabolo. Macdonald, London, 1960.
- News of Murder. Macdonald, London, 1961.
- Duel in the Shadows. Macdonald, London, 1962.
- Glint of Spears. Macdonald, London, 1963.
- The Dark Trade. Macdonald, London, 1965.
- A Strange and Private War. Macmillan, London, 1986. ISBN 0333225988
- Professor in Peril. Macmillan, London, 1987. ISBN 0333417895
- Key Without a Door. Macmillan, London, 1988. ISBN 0333471806

=== Non-fiction ===
- Freedom and the Politicians. Michael Joseph, London, 1964.
- Shadow over Britain – An Examination of Labour Party Policy and Socialist Leaders. Christopher Johnson, 1964.
- Socialized Medicine: Showcase of Failure. Constitutional Alliance, 1969.
- The Gentlemen's Clubs of London. MacDonald and Jane's, 1979. ISBN 0354085042
- White's: The First Three Hundred Years. A & C Black, London, 1993. ISBN 0713637382

=== Edited ===
- Time and Tide Anthology. Deutsch, London, 1956.
- J. Enoch Powell. Income Tax at 4/3 In The £. Tom Stacey, London, 1970. ISBN 0854680004
- The Case for South West Africa. Tom Stacey, London, 1971. ISBN 0854681132
- The C.A. Lejeune Film Reader. Carcanet Press, Manchester, 1991. ISBN 0856359114
- The Concise Dictionary of Foreign Quotations. Stacey International, 1998. ISBN 0953330001
- Quote Unquote: French. Stacey International, 2007. ISBN 978-1905299553
- Quote Unquote: German. Stacey International, 2007. ISBN 978-1905299560
- Quote Unquote: Italian. Stacey International, 2007. ISBN 978-1905299577
- Quote Unquote: Latin. Stacey International, 2007. ISBN 978-1905299591
- Quote Unquote: Spanish. Stacey International, 2007. ISBN 978-1905299584
