= Vince McKeating =

Great Britain and England international rugby league footballer

Personal information
- Full name: Vivian McKeating
- Born: fourth quarter 1919 Cockermouth, England
- Died: 2011 (aged 91–92)

Playing information
- Position: Hooker
Club
Years	Team	Pld	T	G	FG	P
≤1947–48	Dewsbury
1948–53	Workington Town
1953–≥55	Barrow
	Total	0	0	0	0	0
Representative
Years	Team	Pld	T	G	FG	P
1945–54	Cumberland	9	0	0	0	0
1949	British Empire	1	0	0	0	0
1951	England	2	0	0	0	0
1951	Great Britain	2	1	0	0	3

Vivian "Vince" McKeating (birth registered fourth quarter 1919 – 2011) was an English professional rugby league footballer who played in the 1940s and 1950s. He played at representative level for Great Britain, England, British Empire and Cumberland, and at club level for Dewsbury, Workington Town and Barrow, as a hooker.

== Background ==
Vince McKeating's birth was registered in Cockermouth district, Cumberland, England, and he died aged 91–92.

== Playing career ==
=== Dewsbury ===
McKeating played hooker in Dewsbury's 4–13 defeat by Wigan in the Championship Final during the 1946–47 season at Maine Road, Manchester on Saturday 21 June 1947.

=== Workington Town ===
McKeating played hooker in Workington Town's 18–10 victory over Featherstone Rovers in the 1952 Challenge Cup Final during the 1951–52 season at Wembley Stadium, London on Saturday 19 April 1952, in front of a crowd of 72,093.

McKeating holds Workington Town's "Consecutive Appearances" record, with 141-appearances from August 1948 to September 1951.

=== Barrow ===
McKeating played hooker in Barrow's 12–2 victory over Oldham in the 1954 Lancashire Cup Final during the 1954–55 season at Station Road, Swinton on Saturday 23 October 1954.

He played hooker in Barrow's 21–12 victory over Workington Town in the 1955 Challenge Cup Final during the 1954–55 season at Wembley Stadium, London on Saturday 30 April 1955, in front of a crowd of 66,513.

=== Representative honours ===
McKeating represented British Empire while at Workington in 1949 against France, and won caps for England while at Workington in 1951 against Wales, and France, and won caps for Great Britain while at Workington in 1951 against New Zealand (2 matches).

McKeating represented Cumberland. Vince McKeating played hooker in Cumberland's 5–4 victory over Australia in the 1948–49 Kangaroo tour of Great Britain and France match at the Recreation Ground, Whitehaven on Wednesday 13 October 1948, in front of a crowd of 8,818.

== Personal life ==
Vince McKeating was the younger brother of the rugby league footballer, Dan McKeating.
