= Stephen Ray =

Stephen or Steven Ray may refer to:

- Steve Ray (rugby league) (1906–?), Welsh rugby player
- Steve Ray (golfer), in the 1999 World Cup of Golf
- Steve Ray (wrestler), American professional wrestler
- Stevie Ray (fighter), Scottish mixed martial artist

== See also ==
- Stevie Ray, American professional wrestler
- Stephen Rae (disambiguation)
