= Alan Hodkinson =

English rugby league footballer

Personal information
- Born: Leigh, Lancashire, England

Playing information
- Position: Prop
Club
Years	Team	Pld	T	G	FG	P
1968–69	Salford	5	0	0	0	0
1969–81	Rochdale Hornets
1981–83	Wigan	35	1	0	0	3
1983–85	Barrow	48	1	0	0	4
1985	Swinton	9	0	0	0	0
	Total	97	2	0	0	7
Representative
Years	Team	Pld	T	G	FG	P
1975–81	Lancashire	7	1	0	0	3

Alan Hodkinson is an English former professional rugby league footballer who played as a prop. He made his professional debut with Salford, but spent most of his career with Rochdale Hornets. Later in his career, he also had spells with Wigan, Barrow and Swinton. He was part of the Great Britain squad for the 1977 Rugby League World Cup, but did not earn any caps with the team.

== Playing career ==
Born in Leigh, Hodkinson started his professional rugby league career with Salford, making his debut in November 1968. He then moved to Rochdale Hornets, where he debuted in November 1969. He went on to spend 10 seasons with Rochdale, eight of which were as the club's captain.

He was named in the Great Britain squad for the 1977 Rugby League World Cup. Although he played in several warm-up games, he did not make any appearances in the tournament itself. He also represented Lancashire on several occasions in the county championship.

In February 1981, he was transferred to Wigan for a fee of £10,000. He was then sold to Barrow, where he was part of the side that won the 1983 Lancashire Cup.

He joined Swinton in 1985, but announced his retirement later that year.
