= C. A. Lejeune =

British film critic and writer (1897–1973)

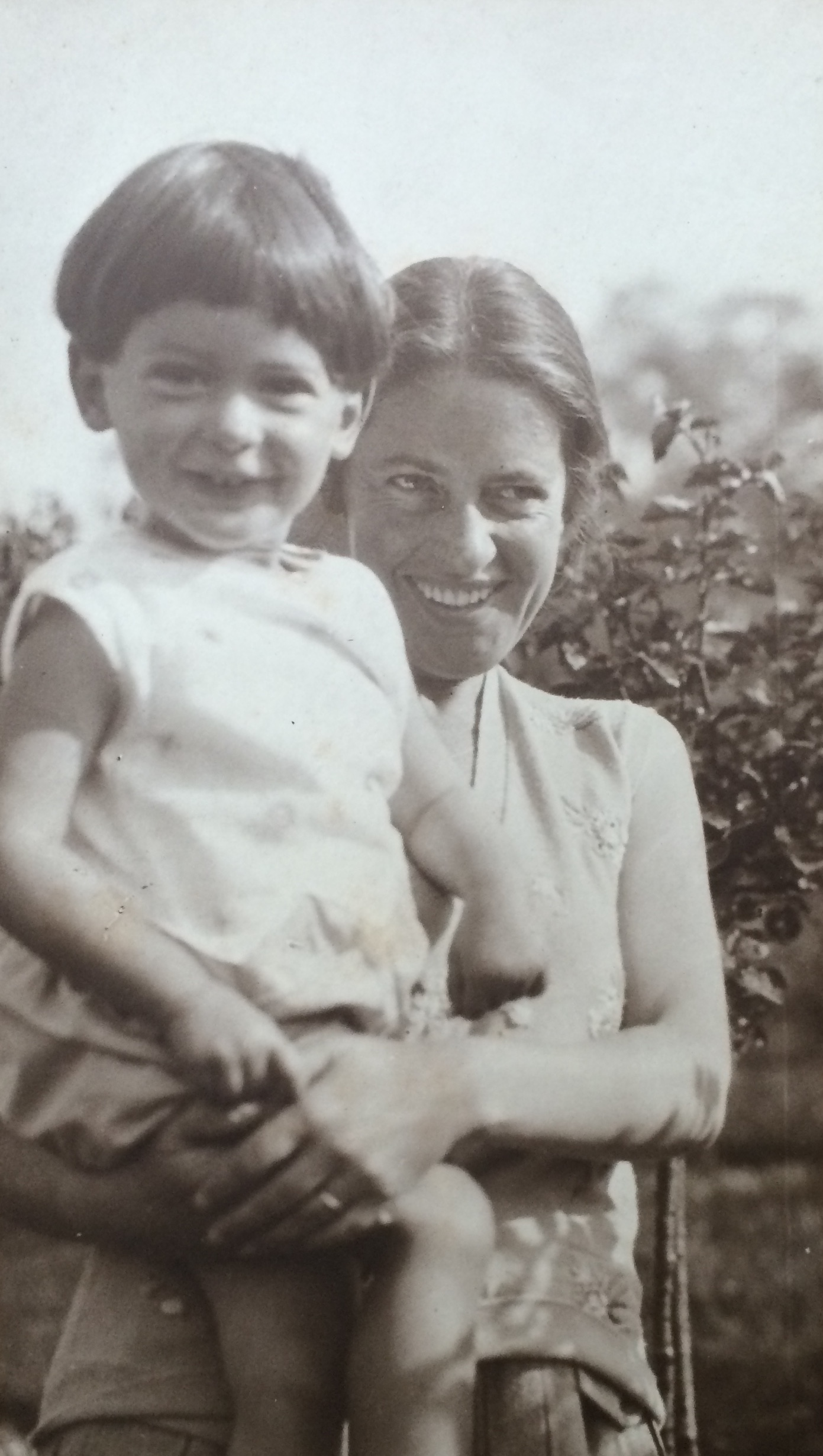
Lejeune with her son Anthony, c. 1931

Caroline Alice Lejeune (27 March 1897 – 31 March 1973) was a British writer, best known for serving as the film critic for The Observer from 1928 to 1960. She was among the earliest newspaper film critics in Britain, and one of the first British women in the profession. She formed an enduring friendship early in her career with Alfred Hitchcock, "when he was writing and ornamenting sub-titles for silent pictures", as she later wrote.

== Family ==
Lejeune was born on 27 March 1897 in Didsbury, Manchester, the youngest in a large family of eight children that eventually resided at 10 Wilmslow Road, Withington, Manchester. Her father, Adam Edward Lejeune, born in Frankfurt in 1845 of Huguenot ancestry, was a cotton merchant who had come to England after doing business in Frankfurt. He died at Zürich, Switzerland, on October 28, 1899 when his daughter was two years old. Her mother, Jane Louisa, who was the daughter of the Nonconformist minister Dr Alexander Maclaren, was a friend of C. P. Scott and of Caroline Herford, who was Caroline's godmother and headmistress of Lady Barn House School, where Caroline received her elementary education. She and four of her sisters (Franziska, Marion, Juliet and Hélène) received their secondary education at Withington Girls' School, of which their mother, Scott, and Caroline Herford were among the founders.

After leaving school, unlike her sisters, she rejected her place at Oxford University and studied English Literature instead at the Victoria University of Manchester.

== Journalism and other writing ==
Partly through her mother's friendship with Scott, Lejeune found work writing for The Manchester Guardian (now The Guardian), initially as a music critic. Her main interests were in Gilbert and Sullivan, Verdi and Puccini. However, she was increasingly excited by the cinema. Her first Guardian contribution on film compared the "beauty of line" that she saw in Douglas Fairbanks's swashbuckling performance in The Mark of Zorro (1920) with the Ballets Russes of Sergei Diaghilev.

With her mother accompanying her, she moved to London in 1921 and the next year she began writing a column for a paper called The Week on the Screen. It was about this time that she befriended Hitchcock. In 1925 she married Edward Roffe Thompson, a psychologist and journalist. (Their home at Lane End was near her mother's home in Pinner.) Their son, Anthony Lejeune, was born in 1928. That year she left The Manchester Guardian for The Observer (which then had no connection with the Guardian group), where she remained for the next 32 years, although she also contributed to other publications including The New York Times, contributing articles about British cinema to the American paper's Sunday drama section.

She wrote an early book on the subject of Cinema (1931), and her film reviews are anthologised in Chestnuts in her Lap (1947) and posthumously in The C. A. Lejeune Film Reader (1991), edited by her son Anthony Lejeune. In the postwar years she was also a television critic for a time, and she adapted books for the medium, writing scripts for the BBC's Sherlock Holmes television series (1951), Clementina and The Three Hostages

Lejeune's film reviews have long been compared to those of Dilys Powell, whose criticism for The Sunday Times overlapped for about 21 years with Lejeune's commentary for The Observer. Unlike Powell, Lejeune became increasingly disillusioned by various trends in films and, shortly after she had expressed her disgust at Michael Powell's film Peeping Tom, she resigned from The Observer following the release of Hitchcock's Psycho in 1960; she walked out of press screenings of both films. Subsequently, she completed Angela Thirkell's unfinished last novel, Three Score Years and Ten (1961) and wrote an autobiography, Thank You for Having Me (1964).

== Death ==
Lejeune died at the age of 76 of natural causes on 31 March 1973. She had been a resident of Pinner for more than forty years. Peter Sellers said of her that "her kindness, her complete integrity, and her qualities as an observer and a commentator have gained her the unqualified admiration of my profession. She respects integrity in others and has no harsh word for anyone whose honest efforts end in failure. Everything she has written, I am sure, has come as much from her heart as her head, and the high quality of her writing, and the standard of film-making she encourages, have made her work a part of cinema history."
