= Derek Hadley =

English rugby league footballer

Personal information
- Full name: Derek Wilfred Hadley
- Born: 6 June 1954 (age 70); Barrow-in-Furness, Lancashire, England

Playing information
- Position: Wing, Centre, Stand-off, Second-row, Loose forward
Club
Years	Team	Pld	T	G	FG	P
1973–86	Barrow	230+44	33	0	0	100
1988–95	Barrow	23+26	3	0	0	12
	Total	323	36	0	0	112
Representative
Years	Team	Pld	T	G	FG	P
≤1982–≥82	Cumbria	3

Derek Hadley (born 6 June 1954) is an English former professional rugby league footballer who played in the 1970s, 1980s and 1990s, and referee. He played at representative level for Cumbria, and at club level for Walney Central ARLFC, Barrow (two spells), and Ulverston ARLFC (two spells), as a wing, centre, stand-off, Second-row, or loose forward.

== Background ==
Derek Hadley was born in Barrow-in-Furness, Lancashire, England.

== Playing career ==
Derek Hadley signed for Barrow on 13 August 1973. the same day as Eddie Szymala. He made his début for Barrow against New Hunslet at Craven Park, Barrow-in-Furness on Friday 7 September 1973, and played his last match (in his first spell) for Barrow against the Sheffield Eagles at Craven Park, Barrow-in-Furness on Wednesday 30 April 1986. He made his second début for Barrow against Mansfield Marksman at Craven Park, Barrow-in-Furness on Sunday 4 September 1988, and played his last match (in his second spell) for Barrow against Bramley at Craven Park, Barrow-in-Furness on Sunday 15 January 1995.

=== County Cup Final appearances ===
Through injury, Derek Hadley missed Barrow's 12-8 victory over Widnes in the 1983 Lancashire Cup Final during the 1983–84 season at Central Park, Wigan, on Saturday 1 October 1983.

=== John Player Trophy Final appearances ===
Derek Hadley played loose forward in Barrow's 5-12 defeat by Warrington in the 1980–81 John Player Trophy Final during the 1980–81 at Central Park, Wigan, on Saturday 24 January 1981.

=== Testimonial match ===
Derek Hadley, and Eddie Szymala shared a Testimonial match/Benefit season at Barrow during the 1983–84 Rugby Football League season, Derek Hadley was awarded a second Testimonial match/Benefit season at Barrow during the 1993–94 Rugby Football League season.

== Outside of rugby league ==
Derek Hadley has worked at GlaxoSmithKline, North Lonsdale Road, Ulverston, Cumbria, LA12 9DR.
