= Young fogey =

UK subculture of traditionalist men

Young fogey is a term humorously applied, in British context, to some younger-generation, rather buttoned-down men, many of whom were writers and journalists. The term is attributed to Alan Watkins writing in 1984 in The Spectator. However, the term "young-fogey conservative" was used by Larry Niven in Lucifer's Hammer and by Philip Roth in The Professor of Desire, both in 1977.

"Young fogey" is still used to describe conservative young men (aged approximately between 15 and 40) who dress in a vintage style (usually that of the 1920s–1930s, also known as the "Brideshead" look, after the influence of the Evelyn Waugh novel Brideshead Revisited). Young fogeys tend towards erudite, conservative cultural pursuits, especially art and traditional architecture, rather than sports. The young fogey style of dress also has some surface similarity with the American preppy style, but is endogenous to the United Kingdom and Anglophone areas of the Commonwealth such as Australia, Canada and New Zealand.

== History ==
The movement reached its peak in the late 1980s and early 1990s with champions such as A. N. Wilson, Gavin Stamp, John Martin Robinson, Simon Heffer and Charles Moore, when it had a relatively widespread following in Southern England, but has declined since. Though generally a middle class phenomenon, it had a wider influence on fashions in the 1980s. Young fogeys are rarely rich or upper class and sometimes make a style virtue of genteel poverty, especially when rescuing old houses. They often combine a conservative cultural outlook with a distaste of Conservative political activity. Often Roman Catholic or Anglo-Catholic in religious observance, their conservative outlook extends to refuting progressive theology.

Today committed young fogeys may be found amongst students at Oxford, Cambridge, Durham, Edinburgh and St Andrews universities; and at some universities in the Commonwealth, notably the University of Queensland and the University of Sydney. Adherents tend to concentrate in some professions: in particular the antiques and art dealing, residential estate agency, conservative classical architecture practices and certain strata of the Roman Catholic and Anglican churches. Strongholds of young fogeys include the Oxford University Conservative Association and Trinity College, Cambridge, but they are also seen elsewhere, with a smattering being found among Englishmen in University Conservative Associations everywhere.

== People ==
The former British member of Parliament (MP) and Cabinet minister Rory Stewart was referred to as a "young fogey" during his schoolboy days.

The Irish broadcaster Ryan Tubridy, who hosted Tubridy Tonight between 2004 and 2009 and then The Late Late Show between 2009 and 2023, described himself as a "young fogey" in the early stages of his career.

The British MP Jacob Rees-Mogg was described as a "young fogey" after his 2010 election to Westminster.

The British writer, editor and broadcaster Anthony Lejeune was described by The Times as: "always out of period, a misfit in the modern world for whom the term 'young fogey' might have been invented".

== Resurgence ==
During the early-to-mid-2020s, young fogey style underwent a revival in Britain and America. Sometimes known as "grandpa-core" or "eclectic grandpa," it is characterised by vintage-inspired casual fashion from the late 1940s to early 1960s. It draws inspiration from the fashion sensibilities of grandfathers from the Silent Generation and incorporates colourful knitwear like patterned sweater vests or shawl collar cardigan sweaters, braces, loafer shoes, corduroy, high waisted dress pants and various tweed accessories, especially flat caps. Celebrities such as Harry Styles, Kendall Jenner, Gigi Hadid and Tyler, the Creator have played a significant role in popularising this trend among the mainstream fashion public in Britain and America.

== Publications ==
- Suzanne Lowry, The Young Fogey Handbook: a guide to backward mobility. Javelin Books, 1985. ISBN 0-7137-1633-9, ISBN 978-0-7137-1633-7, 96 pages
- The Chap magazine
- John Martin Robinson and Alexandra Artley The New Georgian Handbook. Harpers, London, 1985

== See also ==
- The dictionary definition of fogey at Wiktionary and of old fogey
