= 1937–38 Lancashire Cup =

- Structure: Regional knockout championship
- Teams: 13
- Winners: Warrington
- Runners-up: Barrow

The 1937–38 Lancashire Cup was the thirtieth occasion on which the Lancashire Cup competition had been held.
Warrington won the trophy by beating Barrow by 8–4.
The match was played at Central Park, Wigan, (historically in the county of Lancashire). The attendance was 14,000 and receipts were £800.

== Background ==
The number of teams entering this year's competition decreased by one with the withdrawal of Streatham & Mitcham, back to the previous total of 13 but the same fixture format was retained.
There was once again a bye in the first round, and there was still a "blank" or "dummy" fixture. The bye in the second round remained.

== Competition and results ==
=== Round 1 ===
Involved 6 matches (with one bye and one "blank" fixture) and 13 clubs

Game No	Fixture date	Home team	Score	Away team	Venue	Att	Rec	Notes	Ref
1	Sat 11 Sep 1937	Barrow	11–2	St Helens Recs	Craven Park				
2	Sat 11 Sep 1937	Leigh	18–3	Rochdale Hornets	Mather Lane				
3	Sat 11 Sep 1937	Oldham	2–4	Warrington	Watersheddings				
4	Sat 11 Sep 1937	St. Helens	0–11	Broughton Rangers	Knowsley Road				
5	Sat 11 Sep 1937	Salford	2–3	Widnes	The Willows				
6	Sat 11 Sep 1937	Swinton	9–9	Wigan	Station Road				
7		Liverpool Stanley		bye					
8		blank		blank					

=== Round 1 – replays ===
Involved 1 match

Game No	Fixture date	Home team	Score	Away team	Venue	Att	Rec	Notes	Ref
1	Wed 15 Sep 1937	Wigan	24–5	Swinton	Central Park				

=== Round 2 – quarterfinals ===
Involved 3 matches (with one bye) and 7 clubs

Game No	Fixture date	Home team	Score	Away team	Venue	Att	Rec	Notes	Ref
1	Wed 22 Sep 1937	Broughton Rangers	12–8	Leigh	Belle Vue Stadium				
2	Thu 23 Sep 1937	Barrow	3–2	Liverpool Stanley	Craven Park				
3	Thu 23 Sep 1937	Widnes	26–5	Wigan	Naughton Park				
4		Warrington		bye					

=== Round 3 – semifinals ===
Involved 2 matches and 4 clubs

Game No	Fixture date	Home team	Score	Away team	Venue	Att	Rec	Notes	Ref
1	Thu 30 Sep 1937	Barrow	5–2	Broughton Rangers	Craven Park				
2	Thu 07 Oct 1937	Widnes	0–3	Warrington	Naughton Park				

=== Final ===
Game No	Fixture date	Home team	Score	Away team	Venue	Att	Rec	Notes	Ref
	Saturday 23 October 1937	Warrington	8–4	Barrow	Central Park	14,000	£800	1	

==== Teams and scorers ====
Warrington	№	Barrow
	Teams	
Les Jones	1	Freddie French
Jack Garratt	2	Val Cumberbatch
Dave Brown	3	John Higgin
Bill Shankland (c)	4	Tommy Barr
Islwyn Davies	5	Buster Harris
Mel De Lloyd	6	Ian Lloyd
Frank Cueto	7	William Little
Sammy Hardman	8	George Blackburn
Dave Cotton	9	Dan McKeating
Jack Miller	10	Billy Skelly
Jack Arkwright	11	Alec Troup (c)
Ivor Bennett	12	Bob Ayres
Bill Chapman	13	Gordon Rawlings
Chris Brockbank	Coach	unknown
8	score	4
0	HT	0
	Scorers	
	Tries	
David Brown (2)	T	
	Goals	
Bill Shankland (1)	G	Freddie French (2)
	G	
	Drop Goals	
	DG	
Referee		F. Peel (Bradford)

Scoring – Try = three (3) points – Goal = two (2) points – Drop goal = two (2) points

=== The road to success ===
First round
Salford	2
Widnes	3
Swinton	9–5
Wigan	9–24
Oldham	2
Warrington	4
blank
blank
Barrow	11
St Helens Recs	2
Liverpool Stanley
bye
St. Helens	0
Broughton Rangers	11
Leigh	18
Rochdale Hornets	3

Second round
Widnes	26
Wigan	5
Warrington
bye
Barrow	3
Liverpool Stanley	2
Broughton Rangers	12
Leigh	8

Semifinals
Widnes	0
Warrington	3
Barrow	5
Broughton Rangers	2

Final
Warrington	8
Barrow	4

== Notes and comments ==
1 * Central Park was the home ground of Wigan with a final capacity of 18,000, although the record attendance was 47,747 for Wigan v St Helens 27 March 1959

== See also ==
- 1937–38 Northern Rugby Football League season
- Rugby league county cups
