= 1983–84 Lancashire Cup =

- Structure: Regional knockout championship
- Teams: 16
- Winners: Barrow
- Runners-up: Widnes

The 1983–84 Lancashire Cup, known as the Burtonwood Brewery Lancashire Cup for sponsorship reasons, was the 71st occasion on which the Lancashire Cup competition had been held.

It was won by Barrow, who beat Widnes 12–8 in the final at Central Park, Wigan.

== Background ==
This season saw no new clubs and no withdrawals, leaving the total number of entrants at the 16 level. With this full sixteen members there was no need for "blank" or "dummy" fixtures or any byes.

== Competition and results ==
=== First round ===
Involved 8 matches (with no byes) and 16 clubs

Game No	Fixture Date	Home team	Score	Away team	Venue	Att	Rec	Notes	Ref
1	Sat 03 Sep 1983	Rochdale Hornets	4-28	St. Helens	Athletic Grounds	720			
2	Sun 04 Sep 1983	Barrow	13-6	Whitehaven	Craven Park	2707			
3	Sun 04 Sep 1983	Blackpool Borough	4-30	Warrington	Borough Park	1756			
4	Sun 04 Sep 1983	Huyton	12-13	Swinton	Alt Park, Huyton	306			
5	Sun 04 Sep 1983	Leigh	52-10	Carlisle	Hilton Park	4000			
6	Sun 04 Sep 1983	Oldham	26-20	Workington Town	Watersheddings	2567			
7	Sun 04 Sep 1983	Salford	16-15	Fulham	The Willows	1986			
8	Sun 04 Sep 1983	Widnes	36-20	Wigan	Naughton Park	7016			

=== Second round ===
Involved 4 matches and 8 clubs

Game No	Fixture Date	Home team	Score	Away team	Venue	Att	Rec	Notes	Ref
1	Wed 14 Sep 1983	Leigh	10-27	Widnes	Hilton Park	6500			
2	Wed 14 Sep 1983	St. Helens	26-30	Warrington	Knowsley Road	5047			
3	Wed 14 Sep 1983	Salford	2-13	Barrow	The Willows				
4	Wed 14 Sep 1983	Swinton	8-6	Oldham	Station Road	1881			

=== Semi-finals ===
Involved 2 matches and 4 clubs

Game No	Fixture Date	Home team	Score	Away team	Venue	Att	Rec	Notes	Ref
1	Wed 21 Sep 1983	Swinton	8-22	Widnes	Station Road	2614			
2	Wed 21 Sep 1983	Warrington	18-19	Barrow	Wilderspool	3349			

=== Final ===
1 October 1983

Barrow	12 – 8	Widnes
Tries: McConnell; Goals: Ball (3); Drop goals: Ball, Tickle		Tries: Lydon; Goals: Lydon (2)

Central Park, Wigan
Attendance: 7,007
Referee: Kevin Allatt (Southport)
Player of the Match: David Cairns

Barrow	No.	Widnes
	Teams	
Steve Tickle	1	Mick Burke
Terry Moore	2	Joe Lydon
Andy Whittle	3	Eric Hughes (c)
Ian Ball	4	Keiron O'Loughlin
Dave Milby	5	John Basnett
Ralph McConnell	6	Tony Myler
David Cairns	7	Andy Gregory
Alan Hodkinson (c)	8	Steve O'Neill
Les Wall	9	Keith Elwell
Mark McJennett	10	Kevin Tamati
Steve Herbert	11	Fred Whitfield
Eddie Szymala	12	Eric Prescott
Steve Mossop	13	Mick Adams
Dave Elliott	14	Tony Garrity
Dave Tyson	15	Paul Houghton
Tommy Dawes	Coach	Vince Karalius & Harry Dawson

=== The road to success ===
First round
Rochdale Hornets	4
St. Helens	28
Blackpool Borough	4
Warrington	30
Salford	16
Fulham	15
Barrow	13
Whitehaven	6
Huyton	12
Swinton	13
Oldham	26
Workington Town	20
Leigh	52
Carlisle	10
Widnes	36
Wigan	20

Second round
St. Helens	26
Warrington	30
Salford	2
Barrow	13
Swinton	8
Oldham	6
Leigh	10
Widnes	27

Semi-finals
Warrington	18
Barrow	19
Swinton	8
Widnes	22

Final
Barrow	12
Widnes	8

== See also ==
- 1983–84 Rugby Football League season
- Rugby league county cups

== Sources ==
- Fletcher, Raymond; Howes, David, eds. (1984). Rothmans Rugby League Yearbook 1984-85. London: Queen Anne Press. ISBN 978-0-356-10450-8.
