= Frank Castle (rugby league) =

Great Britain and England international rugby league footballer

- Born: c. 1924 Warwickshire, England
- Died: 15 August 1999 (aged 75) Newcastle upon Tyne, England

Rugby union career
- Position: Wing
Senior career
Years	Team	Apps	(Points)
- Coventry R.F.C.
Provincial / State sides
Years	Team	Apps	(Points)
- Warwickshire
- Rugby league career

Playing information
- Position: Wing
Club
Years	Team	Pld	T	G	FG	P
1948	Leigh	1	0	0	0	0
1949–60	Barrow	366	281			843
	Total	367	281	0	0	843
Representative
Years	Team	Pld	T	G	FG	P
1951–53	England	5	6	0	0	18
1952–54	Great Britain	6	4	0	0	12

Frank Castle (c. 1924 – 15 August 1999) was an English Olympic Games sprint trialist, rugby union, and professional rugby league footballer who played in the 1940s, 1950s and 1960s. He played representative level rugby union (RU) for Warwickshire, and at club level for Coventry R.F.C., and representative level rugby league (RL) for Great Britain and England, and at club level for Leigh and Barrow, as a wing. Castle was inducted in to the Barrow Hall of Fame in 2019.

== Playing career ==
=== Club career ===
Castle initially played rugby union for Coventry RFC before turning professional to play rugby league for Barrow in September 1949. Prior to turning professional, he made one appearance for Leigh as a triallist.

Castle played on the wing in Barrow's 0–10 defeat by Wigan in the 1950–51 Challenge Cup Final during the 1950–51 season at Wembley Stadium, London on Saturday 5 May 1951, played on the wing and scored a try in the 21–12 victory over Workington Town in the 1954–55 Challenge Cup Final during the 1954–55 season at Wembley Stadium, London on Saturday 30 April 1955, in front of a crowd of 66,513, and played on the wing in the 7–9 defeat by Leeds in the 1956–57 Challenge Cup Final during the 1956–57 season at Wembley Stadium, London on Saturday 11 May 1957, in front of a crowd of 76,318.

Castle played on the wing in Barrow's 12–2 victory over Oldham in the 1954 Lancashire Cup Final during the 1954–55 season at Station Road, Swinton on Saturday 23 October 1954.

Castle is second in Barrow's all time try scorers list with 281-tries.

=== International honours ===
Castle won caps for England while at Barrow in 1951 against France, in 1952 against Other Nationalities (2 matches), and Wales, in 1953 against Other Nationalities, and won caps for Great Britain while at Barrow in 1952 against Australia (3 matches), and in 1954 against Australia.

Castle also represented Great Britain while at Barrow between 1952 and 1956 against France (2 non-test matches).

== Personal life ==
After ending his playing career, Castle moved to Preston with his family. In his later years he lived with his daughter, Joyce, in Morpeth. He died on 15 August 1999 in Freeman Hospital in Newcastle upon Tyne, aged 75.
