= Harry Ogden =

English rugby league footballer

Personal information
- Born: 18 January 1924; Oldham, Lancashire, England
- Died: 1980 (aged 55–56); Oldham, England

Playing information
- Position: Prop
Club
Years	Team	Pld	T	G	FG	P
1940–56	Oldham	429	26	38		154
Representative
Years	Team	Pld	T	G	FG	P
1946	Rugby League XIII

Harry Ogden (18 January 1924 – 1980) was an English professional rugby league footballer who played in the 1940s and 1950s. He played at representative level for Rugby League XIII, and at club level for Oldham as a prop.

== Playing career ==
=== International honours ===
Harry Ogden represented Rugby League XIII on the tour of France in 1946.

=== Championship final appearances ===
Harry Ogden played at prop in Oldham's 3-7 defeat by Warrington in the Championship Final during the 1954–55 season at Maine Road, Manchester on Saturday 14 May 1955.

=== County Cup Final appearances ===
Harry Ogden played in Oldham's 2-12 defeat by Barrow in the 1954 Lancashire Cup Final during the 1954–55 season at Station Road, Swinton on Saturday 23 October 1954.

=== Club career ===
Harry Ogden joined Oldham in 1940 aged sixteen, and made his début for Oldham against Broughton Rangers during the 1940–41 season, he was a first team regular until a serious leg injury sustained at Workington Town in 1956 ended his playing career.

== Honoured at Oldham ==
Harry Ogden is an Oldham Hall of Fame Inductee.
