= George Dobson (footballer, born 1897) =

English footballer

Personal information
- Full name: George Walter Dobson
- Date of birth: 7 October 1897
- Place of birth: Rotherham, England
- Date of death: 1950 (aged 52–53)
- Position: Winger

Senior career*
Years	Team	Apps	(Gls)
1914–1915	Kimberworth Old Boys		
1919–1920	Barnsley	24	(0)
1920–1921	Norwich City	27	(1)
1921–1923	Rotherham County	19	(1)
1923	Worksop Town		
1924	South Yorkshire Chemical Works		
Total		70	(2)
- * Club domestic league appearances and goals

George Walter Dobson (7 October 1897 – 1950) was an English footballer who played in the Football League for Barnsley, Norwich City and Rotherham County. Dobson guested for Stoke during World War I.

== Career statistics ==
Appearances and goals by club, season and competition
Club	Season	League			FA Cup		Total	
Club	Season	Division	Apps	Goals	Apps	Goals	Apps	Goals
Barnsley	1919–20	Second Division	24	0	2	0	26	0
Norwich City	1920–21	Third Division South	27	1	1	0	28	1
Rotherham County	1921–22	Second Division	17	1	2	0	19	1
Rotherham County	1922–23	Second Division	2	0	0	0	2	0
Career total			70	2	5	0	75	2
