= David Cairns (rugby league) =

GB & England international rugby league footballer

Personal information
- Full name: David Stephen Cairns
- Born: 1 March 1959 (age 66) Barrow-in-Furness, Lancashire, England

Playing information
- Position: Scrum-half
Club
Years	Team	Pld	T	G	FG	P
1978–87	Barrow	341	80	7		289
1987–90	Salford
1990–92	Barrow
	Total	341	80	7	0	289
Representative
Years	Team	Pld	T	G	FG	P
1979–82	Great Britain U-24	2	0	0	0	0
1982–86	Cumbria	2	0	0	0	0
1984	England	1	0	0	0	0
1984	Great Britain	2	0	0	0	0

David Cairns (born 1 March 1959) is an English former professional rugby league footballer who played in the 1970s, 1980s and 1990s. He played at representative level for Great Britain, England and Cumbria, and at club level for Barrow (two spells), and Salford, as a scrum-half.

== Background ==
David Cairns was born in Barrow-in-Furness, Lancashire, England.

== Playing career ==
=== Barrow ===
David Cairns played scrum-half in Barrow's 5–12 defeat by Warrington in the 1980–81 John Player Trophy Final during the 1980–81 season at Central Park, Wigan, on Saturday 24 January 1981.

David Cairns played scrum-half, and was man of the match in Barrow's 12–8 victory over Widnes in the 1983 Lancashire Cup Final during the 1983–84 season at Central Park, Wigan, on Saturday 1 October 1983, the entire Barrow team was inducted into the Barrow Hall of Fame in 2003.

=== Salford ===
In 1987, David Cairns was transferred from Barrow for a Salford club record fee, that was fixed by tribunal at £35,000.

He played scrum-half in Salford's 17–22 defeat by Wigan in the 1988 Lancashire Cup Final during the 1988–89 season at Knowsley Road, St. Helens on Sunday 23 October 1988.

=== Representative honours ===
David Cairns won a cap for England while at Barrow in 1984 against Wales, and won caps for Great Britain while at Barrow in 1984 against France (2 matches).

David Cairns represented Cumbria from circa-1981 to circa-1986.

== Honoured at Barrow Raiders ==
David Cairns, and Eddie Szymala were both inducted into the Barrow Hall of Fame as individuals in 2010, having previously been inducted as part of 1983–84 Lancashire Cup winning team in 2003.
