= Paul Salmon (rugby league) =

Irish rugby league footballer

Personal information
- Full name: Paul Salmon
- Born: 6 March 1981 (age 45)

Playing information
- Position: Fullback, Wing
Club
| Years | Team | Pld | T | G | FG | P |
|---|---|---|---|---|---|---|
| 1999–03 | Barrow Raiders | 74 | 34 | 3 | 1 | 143 |
Representative
| Years | Team | Pld | T | G | FG | P |
| 1999 | Ireland | 1 | 0 | 0 | 0 | 0 |

Paul Salmon (born 6 March 1981) is a former professional rugby league footballer who played in the 1990s and 2000s. He played at representative level for Ireland, and at club level for Barrow Raiders, as a fullback, or wing.

== Playing career ==
Paul Salmon was named in John Kear's England 'A' squad during August 2002. Salmon scored a national cup record 5 tries in one match VS Workington in 2002

In 2002, Salmon agreed a deal to join Widnes Vikings for the 2003 season, but requested his release during pre-season due to an ankle injury.

=== International honours ===
Salmon won a cap for Ireland while at Barrow Raiders 1999 1-cap (sub). Salmon played for England schoolboys against France in 1997 whilst representing Barrow schoolboys ( 1 cap ), Salmon earned 4 caps for Great Britain and Ireland Young Lions in 1999 2 vs France and 2 vs Australian Schoolboys, Salmon toured South Africa with England under 21s in 2001 earning 1 cap vs South Africa
