= Eddie Szymala =

GB & England international rugby league footballer

Personal information
- Full name: Edmund Szymala
- Born: 24 June 1954 (age 71); Barrow-in-Furness, England

Playing information
- Position: Second-row
Club
Years	Team	Pld	T	G	FG	P
1973–84	Barrow	205	41	68		264
Representative
Years	Team	Pld	T	G	FG	P
1976	Great Britain U-24	2	0	0	0	0
1979	England	1	0	0	0	0
1981	Great Britain	2	0	0	0	0

Edmund Szymala (born 24 June 1954), also known by the nickname of "Smiler", is an English former professional rugby league footballer who played in the 1970s and 1980s. He played at representative level for Great Britain and England, and at club level for Barrow, as a second-row.

== Background ==
Szymala's was born in Barrow-in-Furness, Lancashire on 24 June 1954.

== Playing career ==
=== Club career ===
Szymala appeared as a substitute (replacing hooker Howard Allen) in Barrow's 5–12 defeat by Warrington in the 1980–81 John Player Trophy Final during the 1980–81 at Central Park, Wigan, on Saturday 24 January 1981.

Szymala played right-second-row in Barrow's 12–8 victory over Widnes in the 1983 Lancashire Cup Final during the 1983–84 season at Central Park, Wigan on Saturday 1 October 1983, the entire Barrow team was inducted into the Barrow Hall of Fame in 2003.

Derek Hadley, and Eddie Szymala shared a Testimonial match/Benefit season at Barrow during the 1983–84 Rugby Football League season.

Although a popular player with Barrow fans, Szymala earned a reputation for indiscipline, and was sent off on 15 occasions between 1975 and 1981.

=== International honours ===
Szymala won a cap for England while at Barrow in 1979 against France (sub), and won caps for Great Britain while at Barrow in 1981 against France (sub), and France.

== Honoured at Barrow Raiders ==
David Cairns and Szymala were both inducted into the Barrow Hall of Fame as individuals in 2010, having previously been inducted as part of 1983–84 Lancashire Cup winning team in 2003.
