= Alan Watkins =

British journalist

Alan Rhun Watkins (3 April 1933 – 8 May 2010) was for over 50 years a British political columnist in various London-based magazines and newspapers. He also wrote about wine and rugby.

== Life and career ==
Alan Watkins was born in Tycroes, Carmarthenshire, to David John Watkins (1894–1980), a teacher (sometime headmaster at Llanedi School, near Tycroes), from a mining family, and Violet, also a teacher, daughter of Dr Edwin Harris, a GP. He was educated at Tycroes Primary School and Amman Valley Grammar School before studying law at Queens' College, Cambridge. After National Service, he was called to the Bar. In 1955, he married Ruth Howard (died 1982); their children were a son and 2 daughters.

Much of his long career as a commentator on politics was spent at The Observer newspaper (1976–93), but he also wrote for The Sunday Express (1959–64), The Spectator (1964–67), the New Statesman (1967–76), the Sunday Mirror, and the London Evening Standard.

At the end of each year he wrote a piece called "Master Alan Watkins' Almanack", written in the style of a 17th-century seer and making tentative, and slightly tongue-in-cheek, predictions for the year ahead.

=== Political language ===
He coined and popularised a number of phrases that have passed into common journalistic parlance, including "chattering classes"; although he fleshed out the archetypal "young fogey" in The Spectator in 1984, Watkins noted that he had adopted the phrase from the journalist Terence Kilmartin, who had used it in reference to the academic John Casey, and Watkins stated that the phrase originated with Dornford Yates in 1928.

He was noted for coining the political phrase "the men in grey suits", indicating a delegation of senior party figures (such as the Conservative Party's 1922 Committee) who come to tell a party leader that it is time to go. But as he wrote in a footnote in A Conservative Coup:

The original phrase was 'the men in suits'. It was used, for example, by the present writer in the Observer, 6 May 1990. During and before the 39 hours it became transformed into 'the men in grey suits', which stuck. As Lord Whitelaw observed on television, it was an inaccurate phrase, because on the day in question, 21 November, his interviewer could see that he was wearing a blue suit. And, indeed, the typical Conservative grandee tends to wear a dark blue or black suit, with chalk- or pin-stripes, what may be called a White's Club suit. The original phrase 'the men in suits' is the more accurate.

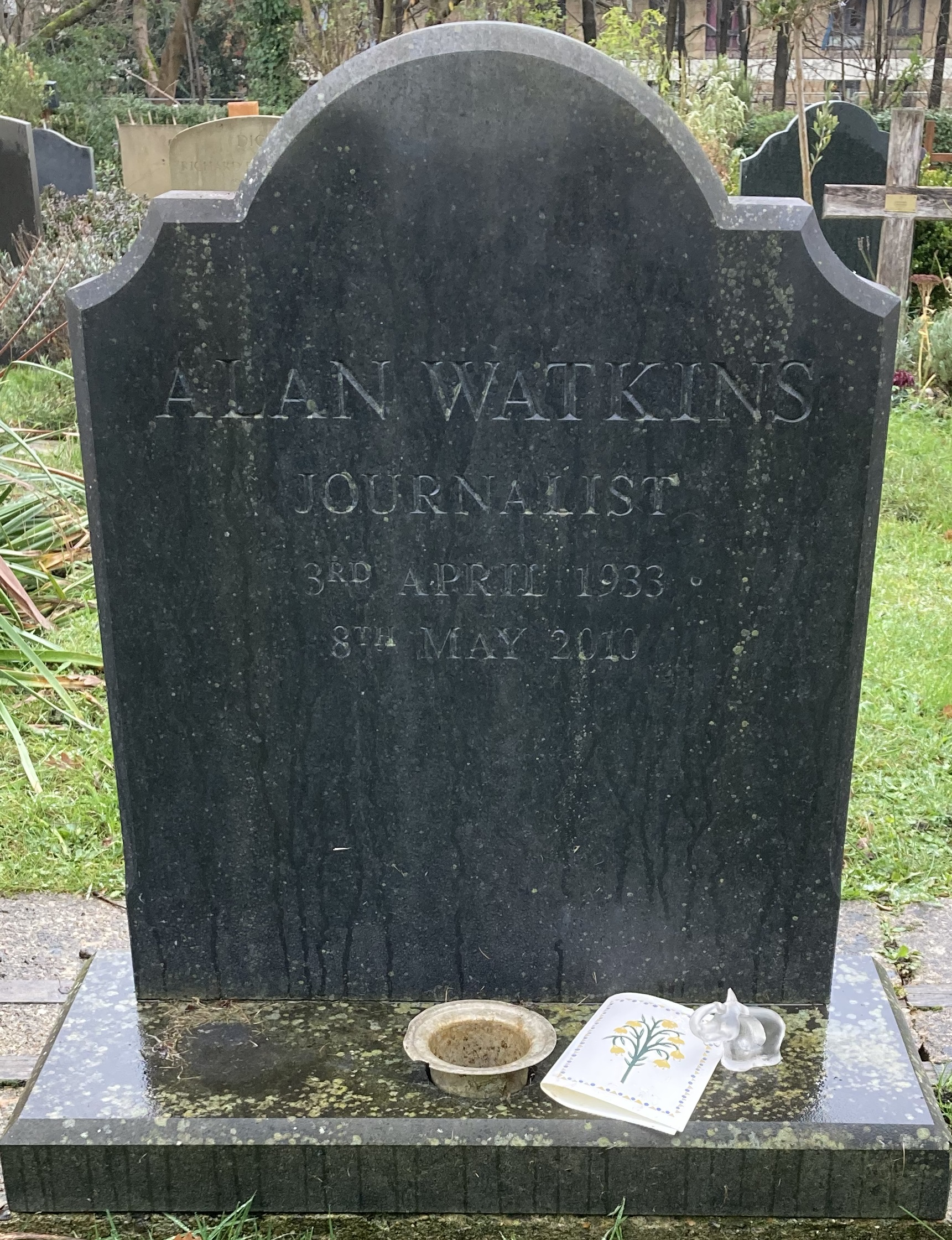
Grave of Alan Watkins in Highgate Cemetery

== Death ==
Watkins was in failing health for several weeks prior to his death at his London home on 8 May 2010 from renal failure, aged 77. He was buried on the eastern side of Highgate Cemetery.

== Bibliography ==
=== Books ===
- Watkins, Alan (1982). Brief Lives, with some memoirs. London: Hamish Hamilton. ISBN 0-241-10890-X. illustrated by Marc (reprinted 2004)
- Watkins, Alan (1990) A Slight Case of Libel: Meacher Versus Trelford and Others, London: Duckworth ISBN 0-7156-2334-6
- Watkins, Alan (1991) A Conservative Coup: The Fall of Margaret Thatcher, London: Duckworth ISBN 0-7156-2386-9
- Watkins, Alan (1998) The Road to Number 10: From Bonar Law to Tony Blair, London: Duckworth ISBN 0-7156-2815-1
- Watkins, Alan (2001) A Short Walk Down Fleet Street: From Beaverbrook to Boycott, London: Duckworth ISBN 0-7156-3143-8

=== Articles ===
- Watkins, Alan (4 October 2008). "The end of old Labour". The Spectator. 308 (9397): 40–41. Archived from the original on 4 December 2008.
