= Jack Grundy (rugby league) =

English rugby league footballer (1926–1978)

Personal information
- Full name: John James Grundy
- Born: 27 August 1926; Prescot, England
- Died: 1978 (aged 51–52); Barrow-in-Furness, England

Playing information
- Position: Second-row
Club
Years	Team	Pld	T	G	FG	P
1948–50	St. Helens	24	1	18	0	39
1950–61	Barrow	374	112	1	0	338
	Total	398	113	19	0	377
Representative
Years	Team	Pld	T	G	FG	P
	Lancashire	11
1955–57	Great Britain	12	3	0	0	9

John James Grundy (27 August 1926 – 1978) was an English professional rugby league footballer who played as a second-row forward in the 1940s, 1950s and 1960s.

He played at representative level for Great Britain and Lancashire, and at club level for United Glass Bottle ARLFC (now Eccleston Lions ARLFC (in Eccleston, St Helens) of the North West Men's League), New Church Tavern ARLFC (in St Helens), St. Helens, Barrow and Roose ARLFC (in Roose, Barrow-in-Furness).

== Background ==
Jack Grundy was born in Prescot, Lancashire. He served in the Royal Navy aboard HMS Liverpool. He died aged 51–52 in Barrow-in-Furness, Cumbria.

== Playing career ==
=== International honours ===
Grundy won caps for Great Britain while at Barrow in 1955 against New Zealand (3 matches), in 1956 against Australia (3 matches). in 1957 against France (3 matches), and in the 1957 Rugby League World Cup against France, Australia, and New Zealand (1-try).

Grundy also represented Great Britain while at Barrow between 1952 and 1956 against France (1 non-Test matches).

=== Club career ===
Grundy was transferred from St. Helens to Barrow for a fee of £1,000 in August 1950 (based on increases in average earnings, this would be approximately £81,710 in 2013).

==== Challenge Cup Final appearances ====
Grundy played left-second-row in Barrow's 0–10 defeat by Wigan in the 1951 Challenge Cup Final during the 1950–51 season at Wembley Stadium, London on Saturday 5 May 1951, played left-second-row, and was voted man of the match winning the Lance Todd Trophy in the 21–12 victory over Workington Town in the 1955 Challenge Cup Final during the 1954–55 season at Wembley Stadium, London on Saturday 30 April 1955, in front of a crowd of 66,513, and played in the 7–9 defeat by Leeds in the 1957 Challenge Cup Final during the 1956–57 season at Wembley Stadium, London on Saturday 11 May 1957, in front of a crowd of 76,318.

==== County Cup Final appearances ====
Grundy played in Barrow's 12–2 victory over Oldham in the 1954 Lancashire Cup Final during the 1954–55 season at Station Road, Swinton, on Saturday 23 October 1954.

==== Career records ====
Grundy is tenth in Barrow's all time try scorers list with 112-tries.

== Genealogical information ==
Jack Grundy was the son of the rugby league forward of the 1920s for Lancashire and St. Helens Recs; Henry 'Harry' Grundy, and the brother of the rugby league footballer for St.Helens Recs and Liverpool Stanley, and the Secretary of Huyton RLFC; Kenneth Grundy.
