= Mark McJennett =

Wales international rugby league & union footballer

Personal information
- Full name: Mark McJennett
- Born: 1 September 1954 (age 70); Cardiff, Wales

Playing information
- Weight: 16 st 0 lb (102 kg)

Rugby union
- Position: Flanker, Wing
Club
Years	Team	Pld	T	G	FG	P
	Cardiff RFC
197?–79	Newport RFC	40	8			32
	Total	40	8	0	0	32
Representative
Years	Team	Pld	T	G	FG	P
	Crawshays RFC

Rugby league
- Position: Prop, Second-row
Club
Years	Team	Pld	T	G	FG	P
1979–≥84	Barrow
Representative
Years	Team	Pld	T	G	FG	P
1980–84	Wales	2+1

Mark McJennett (born 1 September 1954) is a Welsh former rugby union, and professional rugby league footballer who played in the 1970s and 1980s. He played club level rugby union (RU) for Cardiff RFC and Newport RFC (captain), and for the invitational team Crawshays RFC, as a flanker or wing, and representative level rugby league (RL) for Wales, and at club level for Barrow, as a prop, or second-row.

== Background ==
Mark McJennett was born in Cardiff, Wales.

== Playing career ==
=== Barrow ===
McJennett joined Barrow from Welsh rugby union club Newport RFC in December 1979. He played at prop in Barrow's 12-8 victory over Widnes in the 1983 Lancashire Cup Final during the 1983–84 season at Central Park, Wigan, on Saturday 1 October 1983, the entire Barrow team was inducted into the Barrow Hall of Fame in 2003.

=== International honours ===
Mark McJennett won 3 caps for Wales (RL) while at Barrow 1980–1984 2-caps plus 1 as substitute.

== Outside of rugby ==
Mark McJennett is a Company Director.

== Genealogical Information ==
Mark McJennett is the son of the rugby union footballer who played in the 1940s, 1950s and 1960s for Cardiff, Newport, and Crawshays, and coached in the 1960s and 1970s for Newport, Ian McJennett.
