= Dan McKeating =

English rugby league footballer

Personal information
- Full name: Daniel McKeating
- Born: 1911; Seaton, England
- Died: April 1985 (aged 74)

Playing information
- Position: Hooker
Club
Years	Team	Pld	T	G	FG	P
1932–≥47	Barrow
Representative
Years	Team	Pld	T	G	FG	P
1934–37	Cumberland	8	0	0	0	0
1937	British Empire	1	0	0	0	0

Daniel McKeating (1911 – 1985) was an English professional rugby league footballer who played in the 1930s and 1940s. He played at representative level for British Empire and Cumberland, and at club level for Whitehaven Recreation ARLFC, and Barrow, as a hooker.

== Background ==
Dan McKeating's birth was registered in Cockermouth district, Cumberland, England.

== Playing career ==
=== International honours ===
Dan McKeating played hooker in British Empire XIII's 15–0 victory over France at Stade Buffalo, Paris on Monday 1 November 1937.

=== County honours ===
Dan McKeating represented Cumberland.

=== Challenge Cup Final appearances ===
Dan McKeating played hooker in Barrow's 4–7 defeat by Salford in the 1938 Challenge Cup Final during the 1937–38 season at Wembley Stadium, London on Saturday 7 May 1938.

=== County Cup Final appearances ===
Dan McKeating played hooker in Barrow's 4–8 defeat by Warrington in the 1937 Lancashire Cup Final during the 1937–38 season at Central Park, Wigan on Saturday 23 October 1937.

=== Testimonial match ===
Dan McKeating's Testimonial matches at Barrow were shared with; Bob Ayres, Val Cumberbatch, John Higgin and William Little, and took place against Swinton on Saturday 27 April 1946, and against Oldham on Saturday 27 January 1947.

== Contemporaneous article extract ==
"At present on Army service on the Continent, Dan McKeating came to Barrow from Whitehaven in 1932 and proved himself a great hooker. International and Cumberland County player. A top rank man who has given yeoman service to the Barrow Club."

== Genealogical information ==
Dan McKeating was the older brother of the rugby league footballer; Vince McKeating.
