= Bill Healey =

English rugby league footballer

Personal information
- Full name: William Healey
- Born: c. 1925

Playing information
- Position: Loose forward
Club
Years	Team	Pld	T	G	FG	P
1953–58	Barrow
1958–62	Blackpool Borough	67	11	0	0	33
	Total	67	11	0	0	33

Bill Healey was a professional rugby league footballer who played in the 1950s. He played at club level for Barrow, as a loose forward.

== Playing career ==
A latecomer to professional rugby league, Healey signed for Barrow from Walney Central in December 1953, aged 28.

Healey played loose forward in Barrow's 12–2 victory over Oldham in the 1954 Lancashire Cup Final during the 1954–55 season at Station Road, Swinton on Saturday 23 October 1954.

Healey played loose forward in Barrow's 21–12 victory over Workington Town in the 1955 Challenge Cup Final during the 1954–55 season at Wembley Stadium, London on Saturday 30 April 1955, in front of a crowd of 66,513, and played loose forward in the 7–9 defeat by Leeds in the 1956–57 Challenge Cup Final during the 1956–57 season at Wembley Stadium, London on Saturday 11 May 1957, in front of a crowd of 76,318.
