= Matthew Blake (rugby league) =

English rugby league footballer

Personal information
- Full name: Matthew Blake
- Born: 17 March 1983 (age 42)

Playing information
- Position: Prop
Club
Years	Team	Pld	T	G	FG	P
2003–04	Wakefield Trinity Wildcats	6	0	0	0	0
2004(loan)	→Hull Kingston Rovers	2	0	0	0	0
≤2006–≥06	Barrow Raiders	25	1	0	0	4
≤2006–≥06	Gloucestershire All Golds
	Total	33	1	0	0	4

Matthew Blake (born 17 March 1983) is a former professional rugby league footballer who played in the 2000s. He played at club level for Wakefield Trinity Wildcats, Barrow Raiders and the Gloucestershire All Golds, as a prop.
