= Barry Pugh =

Wales international rugby league footballer

Personal information
- Full name: Barry Pugh
- Born: 17 October 1984 (age 41)

Playing information
- Position: Loose forward
Club
Years	Team	Pld	T	G	FG	P
≤2004–≥05	Barrow Raiders
Representative
Years	Team	Pld	T	G	FG	P
2004	Wales	2

Barry Pugh (17 October 1984) is a former professional rugby league footballer who played in the 2000s and 2010s. He has played at representative level for Wales, and at club level for Barrow Raiders, as a loose forward.

== International honours ==
In 2004, while at Barrow Raiders, Pugh was selected to represent Wales at the 2004 European Nations Cup. He earned 2 caps.
