= Bob Ayres (rugby league) =

England international rugby league footballer

Personal information
- Full name: Robert Herbert Ayres
- Born: 11 January 1914; Barrow-in-Furness, England
- Died: July 1993 (aged 79); Lancashire, England

Playing information
- Position: Prop, Second-row
Club
Years	Team	Pld	T	G	FG	P
1933–≥1945	Barrow
Representative
Years	Team	Pld	T	G	FG	P
1936–39	Lancashire	4	1	0	0	3
1937	British Empire	1	0	0	0	0
1938–45	England	3	0	0	0	0

Robert Herbert Ayres (11 January 1914 – July 1993) was an English professional rugby league footballer who played in the 1930s and 1940s. He played at representative level for England, British Empire and Lancashire, and at club level for Barrow, as a prop or second-row.

== Background ==
Bob Ayres was born in Barrow-in-Furness, Lancashire, England, and he died aged 79 in Lancashire.

== Playing career ==
=== Challenge Cup Final appearances ===
Ayres played at second-row in Barrow's 4–7 defeat by Salford in the 1938 Challenge Cup Ffondon on Saturday 7 May 1938.

=== County Cup Final appearances ===
Ayres played at second-row in Barrow's 4–8 defeat by Warrington in the 1937 Lancashire County Cup Final during the 1937–38 season at Central Park, Wigan on Saturday 23 October 1937.

=== Testimonial match ===
Ayres' Testimonial matches at Barrow were shared with Val Cumberbatch, John Higgin, William Little and Dan McKeating, and took place against Swinton on Saturday 27 April 1946, and against Oldham on Saturday 27 January 1947.

=== Representative honours ===
Ayres represented British Empire while at Barrow in 1937 against France, and won caps for England while at Barrow in 1938 against Wales, and France, and in 1945 against Wales.

Ayres won cap(s) for Lancashire while at Barrow.

== Contemporaneous article extract ==
"The man who always comes up smiling, Club captain during the war years. A product of local football, signed in 1933. Has few equals as a second-row. International and County player."
