= Billy Little (rugby league, born 1911) =

England international rugby league footballer

Personal information
- Full name: William Little
- Born: 26 January 1911 Great Clifton, England
- Died: 17 December 2004 (aged 93) Barrow-in-Furness, England

Playing information
- Position: Scrum-half
Club
Years	Team	Pld	T	G	FG	P
1932–47	Barrow	425	47	44		229
Representative
Years	Team	Pld	T	G	FG	P
1932–46	Cumberland	15	1	0		3
1933–34	England	3	2	0		6

Coaching information
Club
Years	Team	Gms	W	D	L	W%
1950	Whitehaven RLFC	0	0	0	0

William Little (26 January 1911 – 17 December 2004) was an English professional rugby league footballer who played in the 1930s and 1940s. He played at representative level for England and Cumberland, and at club level for Barrow, as a scrum-half.

== Background ==
Little was born in the small mining village of Great Clifton, Cumberland, and in his early days he played for the village's club, and he died aged 93 in Barrow-in-Furness, Cumbria, England.

== Playing career ==
=== Challenge Cup Final appearances ===
Little played scrum-half, and scored a drop goal with his left-foot in Barrow's 4-7 defeat by Salford in the 1938 Challenge Cup Final during the 1937–38 season at Wembley, London on 7 May 1938, and was a reserve in Barrow's 0-10 defeat by Wigan in the 1950–51 Challenge Cup Final at Wembley Stadium, London on 5 May 1951.

=== County Cup Final appearances ===
Little played scrum-half in Barrow's 4-8 defeat by Warrington in the 1937 Lancashire Cup Final during the 1937–38 season at Central Park, Wigan on 23 October 1937.

=== Testimonial match ===
Little's testimonial matches at Barrow were shared with Bob Ayres, Val Cumberbatch, John Higgin and Dan McKeating, and took place against Swinton on 27 April 1946, and against Oldham on 27 January 1947.

=== Representative honours ===
Little won caps for England while at Barrow in 1933 against Other Nationalities, and in 1934 against Australia, and France.

Little represented Cumberland.

== Contemporaneous article extract ==
On 25 January 1947, Little was described in the programme of the Big Five Benefit as "the man who spelt the end to Halifax R.L. Cup hopes in 1938. Member of a famous Great Clifton football family. International and Cumberland County man."

Sporting positions
Preceded by Jack Kitching; 1948-1949	Coach Whitehaven RLFC; 1950	Succeeded by Neville Emery; 1951–1956
