= Alec Troup =

GB & England international rugby league footballer

Personal information
- Full name: Lindsay Alexander Troup
- Born: 1909 Kirkwall, Orkney, Scotland
- Died: 11 February 1990 (aged 81) Barrow-in-Furness, England

Playing information
- Position: Second-row, Loose forward
Club
| Years | Team | Pld | T | G | FG | P |
|---|---|---|---|---|---|---|
| 1927–≥38 | Barrow |
Representative
| Years | Team | Pld | T | G | FG | P |
| 1928–46 | Cumberland | 18 | 3 | 0 | 0 | 9 |
| 1934–36 | Great Britain | 4 | 0 | 0 | 0 | 0 |
| 1935–36 | England | 2 | 0 | 0 | 0 | 0 |

Lindsay Alexander "Alec" Troup (1909 – 11 February 1990) was a Scottish professional rugby league footballer who played in the 1930s. He played at representative level for Great Britain, England and Rugby League XIII, and at club level for Barrow, as a second-row, or loose forward.

== Early life ==
Born in the Orkney Islands in Scotland, Troup moved to Maryport, Cumberland with his family at the age of seven.

== Playing career ==
=== Club career ===
Troup was signed by Barrow, and made his debut for the club in April 1927.

Troup played at second-row in Barrow's 4–8 defeat by Warrington in the 1937 Lancashire Cup Final during the 1937–38 season at Central Park, Wigan on Saturday 23 October 1937.

Troup played at second-row in Barrow's 4–7 defeat by Salford in the 1938 Challenge Cup Final during the 1937–38 season at Wembley on Saturday 7 May 1938.

=== International honours ===
Alec Troup won caps for England while at Barrow in 1934 against Australia, and France, in 1935 against Wales, in 1936 against Wales, and won caps for Great Britain while at Barrow in 1936 against New Zealand (2 matches).

Alec Troup played for Rugby League XIII while at Barrow against France.

== Personal life ==
Alec Troup's marriage to Bessie (née Williams) was registered during fourth ¼ 1931 in Barrow in Furness district.
