= Val Cumberbatch =

England international rugby league footballer

Personal information
- Full name: Valentine Cumberbatch
- Born: 14 February 1911
- Died: 23 January 1973 (aged 61) Barrow-in-Furness

Playing information
- Position: Wing
Club
Years	Team	Pld	T	G	FG	P
1932–39	Barrow		134
1939–47	Liverpool Stanley
	Total	0	134	0	0	0
Representative
Years	Team	Pld	T	G	FG	P
1936–38	Lancashire	2	1	0	0	3
1938	England	1	1	0	0	3
- Relatives: James Cumberbatch (brother)

Valentine "Val" Cumberbatch (14 February 1911 – 23 January 1973) was an English professional rugby league footballer who played in the 1930s and 1940s. He played at representative level for England and Lancashire, and at club level for Barrow and Liverpool Stanley, as a wing. Cumberbatch was inducted in to the Barrow Hall of Fame in 2019.

== Background ==
Val Cumberbatch's death was registered in Barrow-in-Furness, Lancashire, England.

== Playing career ==
=== Club career ===
Cumberbatch played on the wing in Barrow's 4-8 defeat by Warrington in the 1937 Lancashire Cup Final during the 1937–38 season at Central Park, Wigan on Saturday 23 October 1937.

Cumberbatch played on the wing in Barrow's 4-7 defeat by Salford in the 1938 Challenge Cup Final during the 1937–38 season at Wembley, London on Saturday 7 May 1938.

Cumberbatch is seventh in Barrow's all time try scorers list with 134-tries. Three players jointly hold Barrow's "most tries in a game" record with six tries, they are; Val Cumberbatch against Batley on Saturday 21 November 1936, Jim Thornburrow against Maryport on Saturday 19 February 1938, and Steve Rowan against Nottingham City on Sunday 15 November 1992.

Cumberbatch's Testimonial matches at Barrow were shared with Bob Ayres, John Higgin, William Little and Dan McKeating, and took place against Swinton on Saturday 27 April 1946, and against Oldham on Saturday 27 January 1947.

=== International honours ===
Cumberbatch won a cap for England while at Barrow in 1938 against France.

== Contemporaneous article extract ==
"The local intermediate League produced Val Cumberbatch, now with Liverpool Stanley, having been transferred during the war. Still an entertaining player to watch. A Lancashire County winger. Signed by Barrow in 1932."

== Personal life ==
Val Cumberbatch was the brother of the rugby league footballer James Cumberbatch.
