= John Higgin =

English rugby league footballer

Personal information
- Full name: John Higgin
- Born: c. 1914
- Died: 6 September 1959 (aged 45)

Playing information
- Position: Centre
Club
Years	Team	Pld	T	G	FG	P
1933–≥1945	Barrow

John Higgin (c. 1914 – 6 September 1959) was a professional rugby league footballer who played in the 1930s and 1940s. He played at club level for Barrow, as a centre.

== Playing career ==
=== Challenge Cup Final appearances ===
John Higgin played at centre in Barrow's 4-7 defeat by Salford in the 1938 Challenge Cup Final during the 1937–38 season at Wembley, London on Saturday 7 May 1938.

=== County Cup Final appearances ===
John Higgin played at centre in Barrow's 4-8 defeat by Warrington in the 1937 Lancashire Cup Final during the 1937–38 season at Central Park, Wigan on Saturday 23 October 1937.

=== Testimonial match ===
John Higgin's Testimonial matches at Barrow were shared with Bob Ayres, Val Cumberbatch, William Little, and Dan McKeating, and took place against Swinton on Saturday 27 April 1946, and against Oldham on Saturday 27 January 1947.

== Contemporaneous article extract ==
"Reliability has been John Higgin’s watchword throughout his service with the Barrow Club – and he has been with them since 1933. He learned his football in the Barrow Schools League."
