= Les Belshaw =

English rugby league footballer, coach and sports photographer

Personal information
- Full name: Leslie Belshaw
- Born: fourth ¼ 1927; Doncaster, England
- Died: 11 February 2016 (aged 88); South Elmsall, England

Playing information
- Position: Prop
Club
Years	Team	Pld	T	G	FG	P
1951–54	Doncaster	77	4			12
1954–55	Barrow	60	3			9
1955–57	Bradford Northern	36	0	0	0	0
1957	Leeds	2	0	0	0	0
1957–61	Doncaster	81	4			12
	Total	256	11	0	0	33

Coaching information
Club
Years	Team	Gms	W	D	L	W%
1966–68	Doncaster

Les Belshaw (birth registered fourth ¼ 1927 – 11 February 2016) was an English sports writer, rugby photographer, and professional rugby league footballer who played in the 1950s and 1960s, and coached in the 1960s. He played at club level for Doncaster (two spells), Barrow and Bradford Northern, as a prop, and coached at club level for Doncaster.

== Playing career ==
Les Belshaw's birth was registered in Doncaster, West Riding of Yorkshire, England, he died aged 88 at the Methodist Homes for the Aged Warde Aldam Care Home in South Elmsall, West Yorkshire, and his funeral took place at Rose Hill Cemetery, Doncaster, on Friday 11 March 2016.

=== Challenge Cup Final appearances ===
Les Belshaw played at prop in Barrow's 21–12 victory over Workington Town in the 1954–55 Challenge Cup Final during the 1954–55 season at Wembley Stadium, London on Saturday 30 April 1955, in front of a crowd of 66,513.

=== County Cup Final appearances ===
Les Belshaw played at prop in Barrow's 12–2 victory over Oldham in the 1954 Lancashire Cup Final during the 1954–55 season at Station Road, Swinton on Saturday 23 October 1954.
