= Reg Parker (rugby league) =

English rugby league coach (1927–2014)

Personal information
- Born: 1927 Ulverston district, England
- Died: 13 November 2014 (aged 87) Grange-over-Sands, England

Playing information
- Position: Prop, Second-row
Club
Years	Team	Pld	T	G	FG	P
1948–58	Barrow	241	39
1958	Wakefield Trinity	8
1958–59	Blackpool Borough	26	1	5	0	13
	Total	275	40	5	0	13
Representative
Years	Team	Pld	T	G	FG	P
1953	Lancashire	1	0	0	0	0
1955	England (Note: 1951 England statistics inadvertently allocated from Batley's George Palmer at rugbyleagueproject.org.)	1	0	0	0	0

Coaching information
Representative
Years	Team	Gms	W	D	L	W%
1984	England	1	1	0	0	100

Reg Parker (1927 – 13 November 2014) was an English professional rugby league footballer who played in the 1940s, 1950s and 1960s, coach of the 1970s, and was an administrator of the 1980s. He played at representative level for England and Lancashire, and at club level for Whitehouse Juniors ARLFC, Barrow, Wakefield Trinity, and Blackpool Borough, as a prop, or second-row, coached at representative level for Great Britain, and was the chairman of the Rugby Football League (RFL) for the 1984–85 Rugby Football League season.

== Background ==
Parker's birth was registered in the fourth quarter of 1927 in Ulverston district, Lancashire, England. He died on 13 November 2014 at Cartmel Grange Care Home, Grange-over-Sands, Cumbria, aged 87. His funeral service took place at St Paul's Parish Church, Grange-over-Sands on 25 November 2014.

== Playing career ==
=== International honours ===
Parker won a cap for England while at Barrow in 1955 against Other Nationalities.

=== Challenge Cup Final appearances ===
Parker played at second-row in Barrow's 21-12 victory over Workington Town in the 1955 Challenge Cup Final during the 1954–55 season at Wembley Stadium, London on Saturday 30 April 1955, in front of a crowd of 66,513, and played at prop in the 7–9 defeat by Leeds in the 1957 Challenge Cup Final during the 1956–57 season at Wembley Stadium, London on Saturday 11 May 1957, in front of a crowd of 76,318.

=== County Cup Final appearances ===
Parker played at second-row and scored a try in Barrow's 12–2 victory over Oldham in the 1954 Lancashire Cup Final during the 1954–55 season at Station Road, Swinton on Saturday 23 October 1954.

=== Club career ===
Parker made his début for Barrow against Belle Vue Rangers in 1948, he was transferred in 1958 for £800 (based on increases in average earnings, this would be approximately £38,470 in 2013), and he made his début for Wakefield Trinity playing Second-row (replacing an injured Ken Traill) in the 17–12 victory over St. Helens at Belle Vue, Wakefield on Saturday 1 February 1958, also making their début in that match were Geoffrey Oakes and Harold Poynton, due to the difficulties in travelling from Grange-over-Sands to Wakefield, at the end of the 1957–58 season he was transferred to Blackpool Borough, where he later became a director.

== Coaching career ==
=== International honours ===
Parker was Great Britain's manager for the 1974 tour of Australia and New Zealand, and the 1977 World Cup.

Parker coached England for one game v Wales in a 28-9 win on 14 Oct 1984 in Ebbw Vale.
