= 1954–55 Northern Rugby Football League season =

- League: Northern Rugby Football League
- Champions: Warrington
- League Leaders: Warrington
- Top point-scorer: Jimmy Ledgard 374
- Top try-scorer: Lionel Cooper 66

The 1954–55 Rugby Football League season was the 60th season of rugby league football.

== Season summary ==
Warrington won their second successive, third overall and to date final Championship when they beat Oldham 7–3 in the play-off final. They also ended the regular season as league leaders.

The Challenge Cup winners were Barrow who beat Workington Town 21–12 in the final.

Blackpool Borough joined the competition.

Warrington won the Lancashire League, and Leeds won the Yorkshire League. Barrow beat Oldham 12–2 to win the Lancashire County Cup, and Halifax beat Hull F.C. 22–14 to win the Yorkshire County Cup.

== Championship ==
| | Team | Pld | W | D | L | Pts |
|---|---|---|---|---|---|---|
| 1 | Warrington | 36 | 29 | 2 | 5 | 60 |
| 2 | Oldham | 36 | 29 | 2 | 5 | 60 |
| 3 | Leeds | 36 | 26 | 2 | 8 | 54 |
| 4 | Halifax | 36 | 26 | 1 | 9 | 53 |
| 5 | Wigan | 36 | 26 | 1 | 9 | 53 |
| 6 | Leigh | 36 | 25 | 2 | 9 | 52 |
| 7 | St. Helens | 36 | 25 | 1 | 10 | 51 |
| 8 | Barrow | 36 | 24 | 0 | 12 | 48 |
| 9 | Featherstone Rovers | 36 | 23 | 1 | 12 | 47 |
| 10 | Workington Town | 36 | 23 | 0 | 13 | 46 |
| 11 | Huddersfield | 36 | 22 | 0 | 14 | 44 |
| 12 | Rochdale Hornets | 36 | 20 | 3 | 13 | 43 |
| 13 | York | 36 | 21 | 0 | 15 | 42 |
| 14 | Hunslet | 36 | 20 | 0 | 16 | 40 |
| 15 | Whitehaven | 36 | 18 | 3 | 15 | 39 |
| 16 | Wakefield Trinity | 36 | 18 | 0 | 18 | 36 |
| 17 | Bradford Northern | 36 | 17 | 2 | 17 | 36 |
| 18 | Keighley | 36 | 18 | 0 | 18 | 36 |
| 19 | Hull | 36 | 16 | 3 | 17 | 35 |
| 20 | Swinton | 36 | 16 | 1 | 19 | 33 |
| 21 | Castleford | 36 | 13 | 4 | 19 | 30 |
| 22 | Widnes | 36 | 13 | 0 | 23 | 26 |
| 23 | Bramley | 36 | 11 | 1 | 24 | 23 |
| 24 | Liverpool City | 36 | 11 | 1 | 24 | 23 |
| 25 | Hull Kingston Rovers | 36 | 10 | 0 | 26 | 20 |
| 26 | Salford | 36 | 7 | 3 | 26 | 17 |
| 27 | Doncaster | 36 | 8 | 1 | 27 | 17 |
| 28 | Batley | 36 | 7 | 0 | 29 | 14 |
| 29 | Blackpool Borough | 36 | 7 | 0 | 29 | 14 |
| 30 | Belle Vue Rangers | 36 | 7 | 0 | 29 | 14 |
| 31 | Dewsbury | 36 | 5 | 0 | 31 | 10 |

| Play-offs |

=== Play-offs ===
Semi-finals
1 | Warrington | 17
4 | Halifax | 9
2 | Oldham | 25
3 | Leeds | 6

Championship final
Warrington | 7
Oldham | 3

==== Final ====
14 May 1955

| Warrington | 7 – 3 | Oldham |
|---|---|---|
| Tries: Bevan; Goals: Bath (2) | | Tries: Pitchford |

Maine Road, Manchester
Attendance: 49,434
Referee: A. Hill (Dewsbury)

| Warrington | Number | Oldham |
|---|---|---|
| | Teams | |
| Eric Frodsham | 1 | Frank Stirrup |
| Brian Bevan | 2 | Roland Barrow |
| Jim Challinor | 3 | Dick Cracknell |
| Albert Naughton | 4 | Alan Davies |
| Len Horton | 5 | Terry O'Grady |
| Jimmy Honey | 6 | Frank Daley |
| Gerry Helme | 7 | Frank Pitchford |
| Danny Naughton | 8 | Harry Ogden |
| Tom McKinney | 9 | Jack Keith |
| Gerry Lowe | 10 | Ken Jackson |
| Harry Bath | 11 | Charlie Winslade |
| Syd Phillips | 12 | Sid Little |
| Bob Ryan | 13 | Bryn Goldswain |
| Ces Mountford | Coach | |

== Challenge Cup ==
Barrow beat Workington Town 21–12 in the final played at Wembley before a crowd of 66,513. Captained by former Great Britain skipper Willie Horne, this was Barrow’s first Challenge Cup Final win, although have been runners-up on four other occasions. Jack Grundy, Barrow's Second-row was awarded the Lance Todd Trophy for man-of-the-match.

Barrow: Clive Best, Jimmy Lewthwaite, Phil Jackson, Dennis Goodwin, Frank Castle, Willie Horne, Edward Toohey, Les Belshaw, Vince McKeating, Frank Barton, Jack Grundy, Reg Parker, and Bill Healey.

== Sources ==
- 1954-55 Rugby Football League season at Wigan.rlfans.com
- The Challenge Cup at The Rugby Football League website
