= Ian Lloyd (rugby league) =

Welsh rugby footballer

Ieuan Lloyd
Personal information
- Full name: Ieuan Lloyd
- Born: 4 March 1914 Cwmparc, Treorchy, Wales
- Died: 10 February 1989 (aged 74) Llwynypia hospital, Rhondda Cynon Taf, Wales,

Playing information

Rugby union
Club
Years	Team	Pld	T	G	FG	P
	Cross Keys RFC
	Penarth RFC
	Leicester RFC
	Rugby Lions
	Total	0	0	0	0	0

Rugby league
- Position: Stand-off
Club
Years	Team	Pld	T	G	FG	P
1935–40	Barrow	139	43	8	8	145

Ieuan Lloyd (1914–1989) was a professional rugby league footballer who played in the 1930s. He played at club level for Barrow, as a stand-off.

== Playing career ==
=== Rugby Union ===
Prior to signing for Barrow he played RU for Cross Keys, Penarth, Leicester & Rugby Lions.

=== Barrow RLFC ===
He signed for Barrow on 20 Sep 1935 from Rugby Lions RUFC, and made his home debut the following day on 21 Sep 1935 v Widnes His last game was on 30 Mar 1940 v Salford (away)

1935/6 season 37 appearances, 18 tries, 1 goal, 56pts

1936/7 season 40 appearances, 11 tries, 1 goal, 35pts

1937/8 season 45 appearances, 11 tries, 6 goals, 45pts

1938/9 3 appearances Injured for nearly all this season.

1939/40 season, 14 appearances, 3 tries, 9pts

=== Challenge Cup Final appearances ===
Ieuan Lloyd played stand-off in Barrow's 4-7 defeat by Salford in the 1938 Challenge Cup Final during the 1937–38 season at Wembley on Saturday 7 May 1938.

=== County Cup Final appearances ===
Ieuan Lloyd played stand-off in Barrow's 4-8 defeat by Warrington in the 1937 Lancashire Cup Final during the 1937–38 season at Central Park, Wigan on Saturday 23 October 1937.

== Post-playing ==
He was demobbed from forces in September 1946, living briefly in Barrow before returning to South Wales.
