= Henry Alexander Ogden =

American artist (1856–1936)

Henry (Harry) Alexander Ogden (1856–1936), also known as H. A. Ogden, was an American illustrator particularly of historical and military subjects.

== Biography ==
He was born in Philadelphia on July 17, 1856, but moved to Brooklyn, New York when he was quite young and it was at the Brooklyn Institute and the Brooklyn Academy of Design that he received his first training in art. At the age of 17, he began work with Frank Leslie's Illustrated Newspaper. This allowed him to travel extensively around the United States and Europe. One visit to the American West in 1877 resulted in over 200 illustrations.

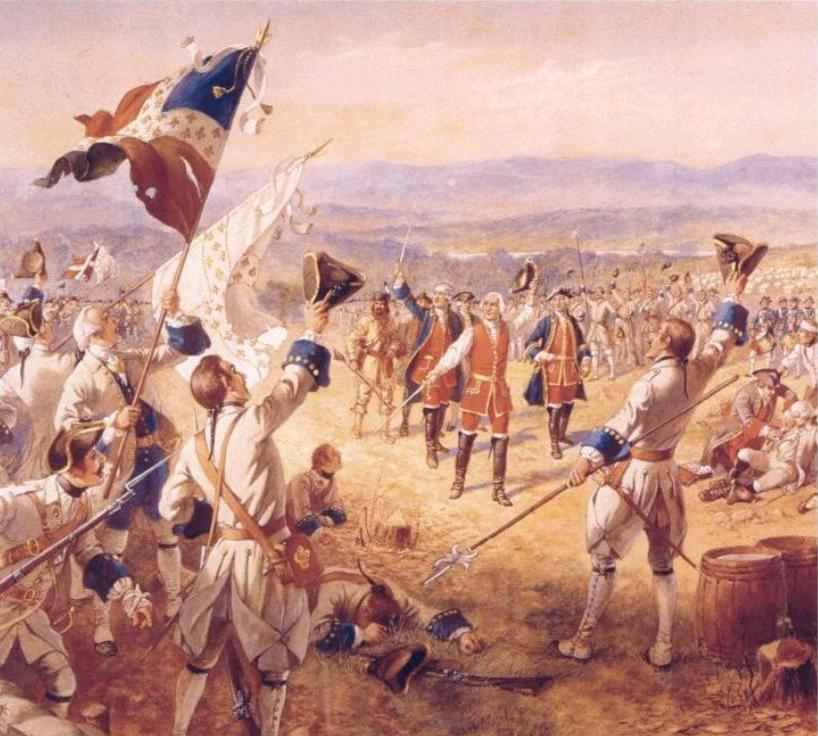
"The Victory of Montcalm's Troops at Carillon" by Henry Alexander Ogden

In 1881 he resigned from Leslie's to set up as a freelance artist, submitting numerous illustrations to various newspapers and magazines. A number of these were illustrations of historical scenes, and Ogden's interest in early America and the Revolutionary War led him to his most ambitious project, to record the uniforms of the United States Army. Between 1890 and 1907, various sections of Uniforms of the United States Army were published. The Quartermaster General of the army had been so impressed with Ogden's work that he commissioned the artist to prepare designs depicting the uniforms of the army since its inception in the 18th century. The first dozen watercolors were completed by the mid-1880s; these were used in the Regulations for the Uniform of the Army of the United States published in May 1888. The artist began work on seventy paintings representing uniforms worn between 1774 and 1888. Some of this work was undertaken at Fort Jay on Governor's Island off New York, and to facilitate his work, examples of uniforms were sent up from Washington, D.C. In each drawing, Ogden depicted five soldiers of different rank. For each completed plate, he received $100. In 1890, the first forty-seven plates were published, and subsequent plates covered the period from 1898 up to 1907.

Besides his work on the uniform series, Ogden was a prolific illustrator for books including The Pageant of America. He was a member of the New York Historical Society and the Illustrators Society, and was considered one of the leading authorities on colonial costume. He lent advice to various historical pageants including the Hudson-Fulton Celebration of 1909.

He died on June 14, 1936, at Englewood, New Jersey, at the age of 79.

== Published works ==
Publications include:

- The Boy's Book of Famous Regiments (1914), with the collaboration of H.A. Hitchcock, four full-page color illustrations and 26 b/w in-line illustrations by H.A. Ogden, McBride, Nast & Company. November 1914.
