= George Dobson (rugby league) =

English rugby league footballer

Personal information
- Full name: George Dobson
- Born: c. 1891; Barrow-in-Furness, England
- Died: December 1954 (aged 63); Roose, England

Playing information
- Position: Centre
Club
Years	Team	Pld	T	G	FG	P
1909–22	Barrow	284	101	49		401
Representative
Years	Team	Pld	T	G	FG	P
1912	Lancashire	1

George Dobson (c. 1891 – December 1954) was an English professional rugby league footballer who played in the 1900s, 1910s and 1920s. He played at representative level for Lancashire, and at club level for Barrow, as a centre.

== Background ==
George Dobson was born in Barrow-in-Furness, Lancashire, England, and his death aged 63 was registered in Barrow-in-Furness, Lancashire, England.

== Playing career ==
=== County honours ===
George Dobson won a cap for Lancashire while at Barrow in 1912 against Yorkshire.

=== Testimonial match ===
George Dobson's Testimonial match ticket

George Dobson's Testimonial match at Barrow took place against a Harold Wagstaff Select XIII team at Little Park, Roose, Barrow-in-Furness on Saturday 29 April 1922.

=== Career records ===
George Dobson is thirteenth in Barrow's all time try scorers list with 101-tries.

== Honoured at Barrow Raiders ==
George Dobson is a Barrow Raiders Hall of Fame inductee.
