= Freddie French =

NZ rugby league footballer

Personal information
- Full name: Frederick Thomas James French
- Born: 17 April 1911 New Zealand
- Died: 2 May 1989 (aged 78) New Zealand

Playing information

Rugby union
Club
Years	Team	Pld	T	G	FG	P
≤1935–≤35	Sydenham

Rugby league
- Position: Fullback, Centre
Club
Years	Team	Pld	T	G	FG	P
1935	Warrington	1	0	0	0	0
1936–45	Barrow
	Total	1	0	0	0	0

Frederick Thomas James French (17 April 1911 – 2 May 1989) was a New Zealand rugby union and professional rugby league footballer who played in the 1930s and 1940s. He played rugby union for the Sydenham club in Christchurch, before changing codes and travelling to England where he played rugby league for Warrington and Barrow, as a fullback or centre.

== Playing career ==
=== Challenge Cup Final appearances ===
French played fullback, and scored a goal in Barrow's 4–7 defeat by Salford in the 1938 Challenge Cup Final during the 1937–38 season at Wembley, London on Saturday 7 May 1938.

=== County Cup Final appearances ===
French played fullback, and kicked two conversions in Barrow's 4–8 defeat by Warrington in the 1937 Lancashire Cup Final during the 1937–38 season at Central Park, Wigan, on Saturday 23 October 1937.

=== Club career ===
French played centre in Warrington's 30–9 victory over Leigh on 30 November 1935, in his only match for Warrington.
