= Tyssul Griffiths =

Wales international rugby league & union footballer (1919–1978)

Tuss Griffiths

Personal information
- Full name: Tyssul Griffiths
- Born: 6 June 1919 Bridgend, Wales
- Died: 25 August 1978 (aged 59) Leeds, England

Playing information

Rugby union
- Position: Full-back
Club
Years	Team	Pld	T	G	FG	P
1945–46	Newport RFC	20	1	1
Representative
Years	Team	Pld	T	G	FG	P
1945–46	Wales XV

Rugby league
- Position: Fullback
Club
Years	Team	Pld	T	G	FG	P
1946–51	Hunslet	167	7	184	0	389
1951–52	Doncaster	59	3	140	0	289
1952–56	Halifax	151	5	435	3	891
1956	Dewsbury
	Total	377	15	759	3	1569
Representative
Years	Team	Pld	T	G	FG	P
1946–51	Wales	2	0	0	0	0

Tyssul "Tuss" Griffiths (6 June 1919 – 25 August 1978) was a Welsh rugby union, and professional rugby league footballer who played in the 1940s and 1950s. He played representative level rugby union for Wales XV, and at club level for Newport RFC, as a full-back, and representative level rugby league for Wales, and at club level for Hunslet, Doncaster, Halifax, and Dewsbury, as a fullback.

== Background ==
Tuss" Griffiths was born in Bridgend, Wales, and he died aged 59 in Leeds, West Yorkshire, England.

== Rugby union career ==
Griffiths was born on 6 June 1919 in Blaengarw, Bridgend. He made his rugby union début for Newport RFC in October 1945. Griffiths represented Wales while at Newport RFC in the 'Victory International', but was not awarded a cap.

== Rugby league career ==
=== Hunslet ===
Griffiths switched to rugby league, and joined Hunslet in 1946, and went on to make 167 appearances for the club.

=== Doncaster ===
Griffiths, who had been transfer listed by Hunslet, was signed by newly founded Doncaster in July 1951. He played in Doncaster's inaugural league game on 18 August 1951, scoring two conversions in a 10–3 victory over Wakefield Trinity. He played 59 games for Doncaster, and was the club's top points scorer for the 1951–52 and 1952–53 seasons.

=== Halifax ===
In December 1952, Griffiths was signed by Halifax for a fee of around £1,000. He played fullback in Halifax's 4–4 draw with Warrington in the 1954 Challenge Cup Final during the 1953–54 season at Wembley Stadium, London on Saturday 24 April 1954, in front of a crowd of 81,841, in front of a crowd of 81,841, and played fullback, and kicked two penalty goals (2 points each) in the 4–8 defeat by Warrington in the 1954 Challenge Cup Final replay during the 1953–54 season at Odsal Stadium, Bradford on Wednesday 5 May 1954, in front of a record crowd of 102,575 or more, and played fullback, and kick a goal in Halifax's 2–13 defeat by St. Helens in the 1955–56 Challenge Cup Final during the 1955–56 season at Wembley Stadium, London on Saturday 28 April 1956, in front of a crowd of 79,341.

Griffiths is one of less than twenty-five Welshmen to have scored more than 1000-points in their rugby league career.

=== International honours ===
Griffiths won two caps for Wales; his first appearance was in 1946 while at Hunslet, and he won his second cap in 1951 as a Doncaster player.
