= Cording =

Cording may refer to:

- Cording (dog grooming)
- Cording (mycobacterium)
- Cording (surname), a surname
- Cording, a sign of superficial thrombophlebitis

== See also ==
- Cord (disambiguation)
