= 1951–52 Challenge Cup =

Rugby league competition

- Duration: 5 rounds
- Winners: Workington Town
- Runners-up: Featherstone Rovers

The 1951–52 Challenge Cup was the 51st staging of rugby league's oldest knockout competition, the Challenge Cup.

== First round ==
=== First leg ===
First round, first leg scores
Date	Home	Score	Away
9 Feb 1952	Batley	9–9	Bramley
9 Feb 1952	Bradford Northern	6–5	Doncaster
9 Feb 1952	Cardiff	7–7	Dewsbury
9 Feb 1952	Castleford	4–5	Swinton
9 Feb 1952	Huddersfield	5–13	Halifax
9 Feb 1952	Hull FC	8–6	Oldham
9 Feb 1952	Leeds	44–14	Hull Kingston Rovers
9 Feb 1952	Leigh	11–4	Keighley
9 Feb 1952	Rochdale Hornets	7–8	Featherstone Rovers
9 Feb 1952	St Helens	6–5	Belle Vue Rangers
9 Feb 1952	Salford	13–6	Hunslet
9 Feb 1952	Wakefield Trinity	18–13	Wigan
9 Feb 1952	Warrington	28–4	Liverpool
9 Feb 1952	Whitehaven	16–0	Rylands Recs
9 Feb 1952	Widnes	5–5	Barrow
9 Feb 1952	York	7–18	Workington Town

=== Second leg ===
First round, second leg scores
Date	Home	Score	Away
16 Feb 1952	Barrow	8–2	Widnes
16 Feb 1952	Belle Vue Rangers	4–9	St Helens
16 Feb 1952	Bramley	0–9	Batley
16 Feb 1952	Dewsbury	16–0	Cardiff
16 Feb 1952	Doncaster	4–7	Bradford Northern
16 Feb 1952	Featherstone Rovers	17–2	Rochdale Hornets
16 Feb 1952	Halifax	5–5	Huddersfield
16 Feb 1952	Hull Kingston Rovers	3–5	Leeds
16 Feb 1952	Hunslet	6–3	Salford
16 Feb 1952	Keighley	0–8	Leigh
16 Feb 1952	Liverpool	6–6	Warrington
16 Feb 1952	Oldham	24–0	Hull FC
16 Feb 1952	Rylands Recs (Note: Match played at Warrington's ground, Wilderspool)	9–9	Whitehaven
16 Feb 1952	Swinton	2–9	Castleford
16 Feb 1952	Wigan	40–3	Wakefield Trinity
16 Feb 1952	Workington Town	42–5	York

== Second round ==
Second round scores
Date	Home	Score	Away
1 Mar 1952	Batley	4–11	Featherstone Rovers
1 Mar 1952	Castleford	6–7	Leigh
1 Mar 1952	Leeds	12–9	Oldham
1 Mar 1952	Salford	6–11	Barrow
1 Mar 1952	Warrington	26–9	Dewsbury
1 Mar 1952	Whitehaven	7–5	Halifax
1 Mar 1952	Wigan	28–12	Bradford Northern
8 Mar 1952	Workington Town	15–4	St Helens

== Quarter-finals ==
Quarter-final scores
Date	Home	Score	Away
15 Mar 1952	Featherstone Rovers	14–11	Wigan
15 Mar 1952	Leigh	9–5	Leeds
15 Mar 1952	Whitehaven	2–10	Barrow
15 Mar 1952	Workington Town	14–0	Warrington

== Semi-finals ==
Semi-final scores
Date	Home	Score	Away
29 Mar 1952	Barrow	2–5	Workington Town
29 Mar 1952	Featherstone Rovers	6–2	Leigh

== Final ==
Workington Town beat Featherstone Rovers 18–10 in the final played at Wembley Stadium on Saturday 19 April 1952 in front of a crowd of 72,093. Workington full-back and captain-coach Gus Risman became the oldest player to appear in a Cup final at age 41. Three Australians, Tony Paskins, John Mudge and Bevan Wilson came up with decisive plays to help relative newcomers Workington to victory. It was the club's first Challenge Cup win in their first appearance in the final. Billy Ivison, Workington Town's loose forward, was awarded the Lance Todd Trophy for man-of-the-match.

19 April 1952

Workington Town	18 – 10	Featherstone Rovers
Try Lawrenson (2), Mudge, Wilson; Goals Risman (3)		Try Batten, Evans; Goals Miller (2)

Wembley, London
Attendance: 72,093
Referee: Charlie Appleton (Warrington)
Player of the Match: Billy Ivison

1	Gus Risman (c)
2	Johnny H. Lawrenson
3	Tony Paskins
4	Eppie Gibson
5	George Wilson
6	John H. Thomas
7	Albert Pepperell
8	Jimmy Hayton
9	Vince McKeating
10	Jimmy Wareing
11	Rupert Mudge
12	Bevan Wilson
13	Billy Ivison
Coach:
Gus Risman

1	Freddie Miller
2	Eric Batten (c)
3	Donald Metcalfe
4	Alan Tennant
5	Norman Mitchell
6	Ray Cording
7	Ray Evans
8	Ken Welburn
9	Bill Bradshaw
10	John Daly
11	Laurie Gant
12	Fred Hulme
13	Cliff Lambert
Coach:
Eric Batten
