= Rupert Mudge =

Australian rugby union and rugby league footballer

Personal information
- Born: 6 June 1928
- Died: 23 July 1993 (aged 65)

Playing information
- Position: Prop, Second-row
Club
Years	Team	Pld	T	G	FG	P
1948–55	Workington Town
1955–58	Eastern Suburbs	47	3	0	0	9
	Total	47	3	0	0	9
Representative
Years	Team	Pld	T	G	FG	P
1949–53	Other Nationalities	13	1	0	0	3

John "Rupert" Mudge (1928–1993) was an Australian rugby union and rugby league footballer who played in the 1940s and 1950s. He played both rugby codes in Sydney, New South Wales as well as playing rugby league in England. While in England, he played at representative level for British Empire and Other Nationalities.

== Biography ==
Rupert John Mudge played for the Randwick rugby union club in his junior years before being recruited by English rugby league club Workington Town in 1948, where he was joined by fellow Australian recruit Tony Paskins.

Mudge was coached by former Great Britain rugby league test captain, Gus Risman. A back-rower, or prop, Rupert Mudge played at second-row, and scored a try in Workington Town's 18–10 victory over Featherstone Rovers in the 1951–52 Challenge Cup Final during the 1951–52 season at Wembley Stadium, London on Saturday 19 April 1952, in front of a crowd of 72,093.

Three Australian footballers were in the Workington Town side, including Rupert, Tony Paskins and Bevan Wilson. They played the match in front of Anthony Eden, who was Foreign Minister in the Government and Rupert John Mudge scored the longest ever running try at Wembley, which was the turning point in the match. It was then added to when Aussie teammate Tony Paskins and George Wilson together scored another try in the final minutes of the game and Workington Town team beat Featherstone and won.

Rupert Mudge played at second-row in Workington Town's 12–21 defeat by Barrow in the 1955 Challenge Cup Final during the 1954–55 season at Wembley Stadium, London on Saturday 30 April 1955, in front of a crowd of 66,513.

In 1955 both Mudge and Paskins returned to Australia where they joined the Eastern Suburbs rugby league team, Paskins was appointed captain. Mudge who played 45 matches for the Eastern Suburbs club in the years (1955–58) is recognised as that club's 448th player.

After his retirement from football Rupert spent some years as a panelist on the Channel Seven Rugby League panel discussion program "Controversy Corner" hosted by Rex (the Moose) Mossop.

In his professional life in Australia, besides football, he worked for P.Rowe Pty. Ltd.

He married his Australian sweetheart, Yvonne Rita Trenerry, who had followed him to England in Workington Town where they lived until 1955 when they returned to Australia to live at Coogee Beach. They had two children, Barbara and John.

In the late 1990s Rupert John Mudge was invited to England for a special celebration at Wembley Stadium, because he still held the record for the longest running try. Returning home happy he succumbed to the cancer which claimed his life in six short weeks. He died at the Prince of Wales Hospital, Sydney on 23 July 1993. He was cremated at Eastern Suburbs Memorial Park.
