= Fefé =

Perfume for dogs

Fefé is a perfume for dogs, launched in 2024 by Dolce & Gabbana.

It is priced at €99 for a 100 ml bottle, and named after co-founder Domenico Dolce's dog. The alcohol-free concoction was designed by perfumer Emilie Coppermann and includes notes of musk, ylang ylang, and sandalwood.

Fefé has been certified under the Italian Bureau Veritas' Safe Pet Cosmetics specifications.

The Dolce & Gabbana website offers instructions for applying the perfume to a dog:

Spray Fefé on your hands or on a brush and proceed by rubbing or brushing your dog's fur from the middle of the body towards the tail to give them a moment of scented pampering.

It is thought to be the first fragrance designed for dogs from a major luxury brand. The release of the perfume spurred a warning from the RSPCA to avoid strongly scented perfumes that may be unpleasant for dogs.

== See also ==
- Dog fashion
