= Ray Evans (rugby league) =

English rugby league footballer

Personal information
- Born: fourth ¼ 1930; Pontefract district, England
- Died: 13 August 2017 (aged 86)

Playing information
- Position: Scrum-half
Club
Years	Team	Pld	T	G	FG	P
1951–54/55	Featherstone Rovers	73	22	2	0	70
1954/55–≥54/55	Rochdale Hornets
≥1954/55–≥54/55	Hull Kingston Rovers	39	9	0	0	27
	Total	112	31	2	0	97

Ray Evans (fourth ¼ 1930 – 13 August 2017) was an English professional rugby league footballer who played in the 1950s. He played at club level for Featherstone Rovers, the Rochdale Hornets, and Hull Kingston Rovers, as a scrum-half.

== Background ==
Ray Evans' birth was registered in Pontefract district, West Riding of Yorkshire, England, and he died aged 86.

== Club career ==
Evans made his début for Featherstone Rovers, and scored a try against Rochdale Hornets on Saturday 18 August 1951, and played his last game for Featherstone Rovers against Widnes on Monday 23 August 1954, during September 1954 he was sold to Rochdale Hornets for transfer fee of £1,500 (based on increases in average earnings, this would be approximately £94,950 in 2016).

=== Challenge Cup Final appearances ===
Evans played scrum-half, and scored a try in Featherstone Rovers' 12-18 defeat by Workington Town in the 1952 Challenge Cup Final during the 1951–52 season at Wembley Stadium, London on Saturday 19 April 1952, in front of a crowd of 72,093.

== Genealogical information ==
Evans was the youngest brother of the rugby league stand-off/scrum-half for Featherstone Rovers; Wilf Evans, and the rugby league scrum-half for Featherstone Rovers; Joe Evans. Evans' marriage to Sheila (née Hill) took place at All Saints' Church, Featherstone, and was registered during first ¼ 1952. They had children; the rugby league footballer who played scrum-half in the 1970s for Featherstone Rovers; Barry Evans (birth registered third ¼ 1952 (age 72–73)), and Denise Evans (birth registered fourth ¼ 1955 (age 69–70)). Ray Evans was also the grandfather of the rugby league footballer, and coach; Danny Evans, and two other grandchildren, and also six great-grandchildren.

== Life and death ==
Ray Evans owned two betting shops in Featherstone in the 1960s. Ray Evans' funeral service took place at the Methodist church, Featherstone at 10:30am on Wednesday 30 August 2017, followed by a committal at Pontefract Crematorium, Wakefield Road, Pontefract at 11:40am, and a celebration of Ray Evans' life at Featherstone Rovers' clubhouse.
