= Puli dog =

Puli
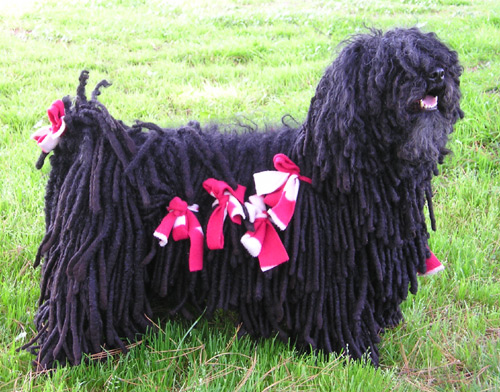
- Puli
- Other names: Hungarian Puli
- Common nicknames: Hungarian Water Dog
- Origin: Hungary
Kennel club standards
- Fédération Cynologique Internationale: standard

The Puli (plural pulis or pulik) is a small-medium breed of Hungarian herding dog known for its long, corded coat. The tight curls of the coat appear similar to dreadlocks. A similar-looking, but much larger breed – also Hungarian – is the Komondor.

== Description ==
=== Appearance ===
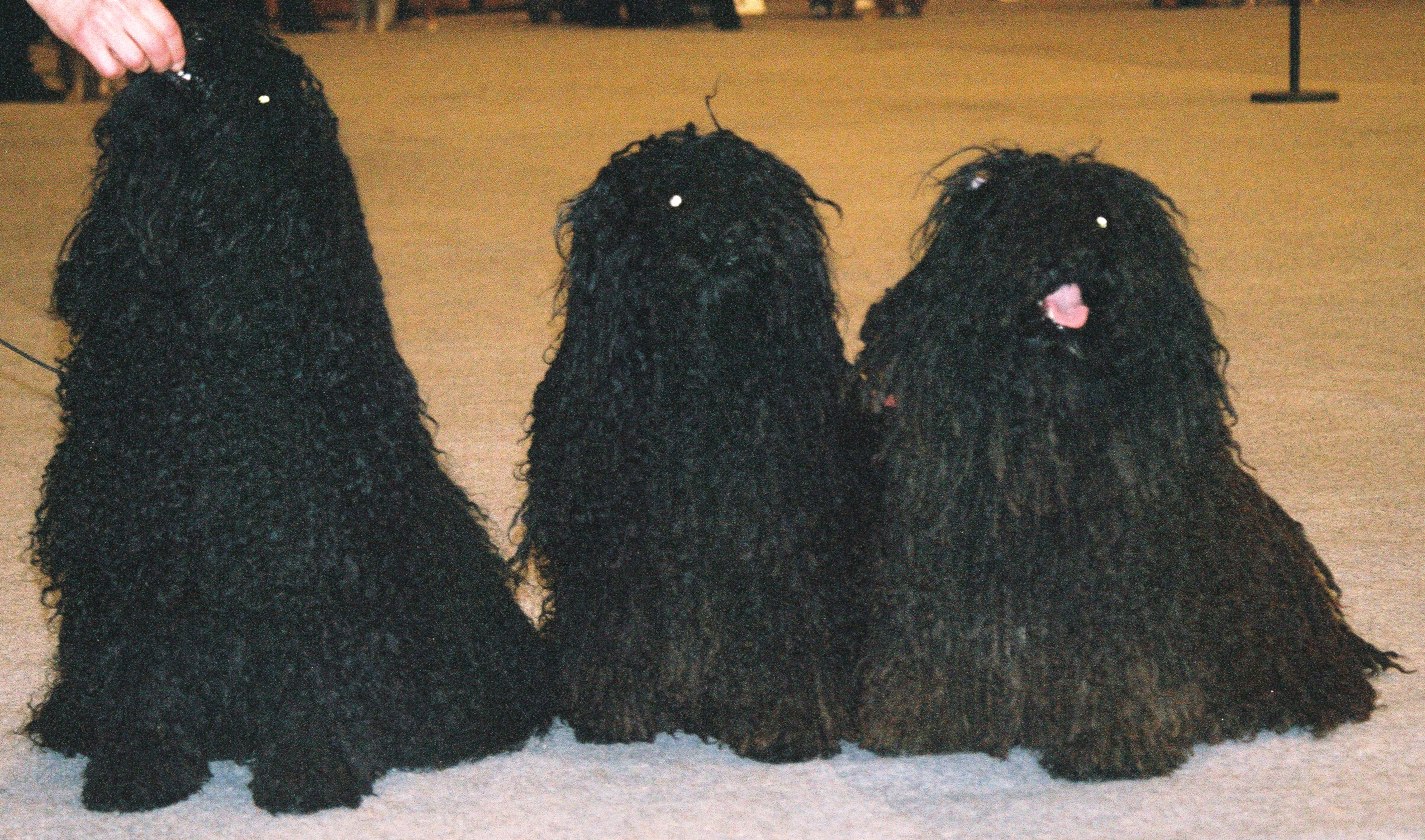
Black Pulis

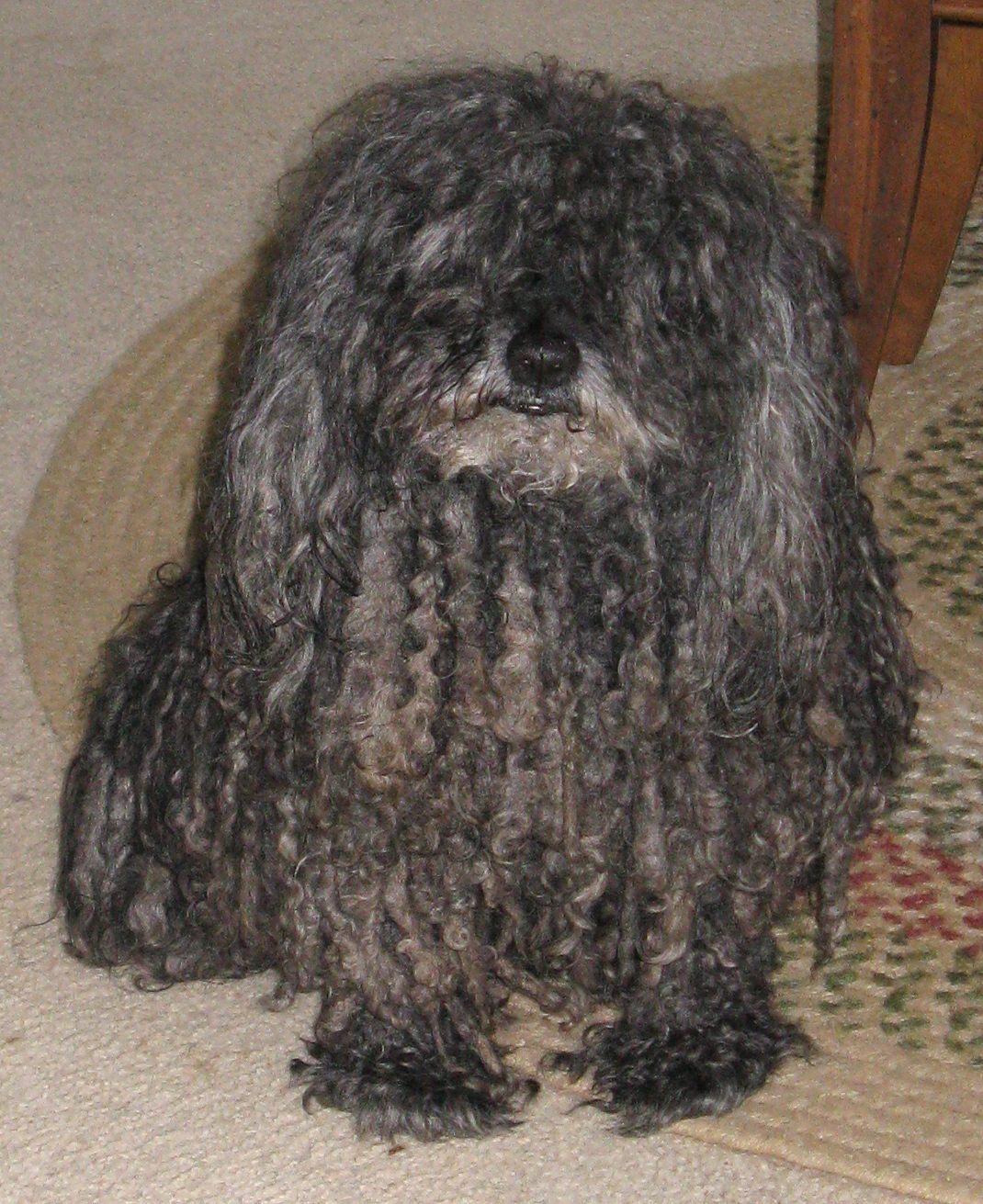
Grey Puli

The Puli is a solid-colored dog that is usually black. Other less common coat colors are white, gray, or cream (off-white or fakó in Hungarian). A variety of the cream-coated dogs have black masks. The white Pulis are not albino, nor do they have blue eyes. They commonly have dark pigment, black pads, black noses and black pigment inside the mouth. The white gene is recessive to the pure black gene. The breed standard for females is about 16.5 inches (42 cm) at the withers and 17 inches (43 cm) for males. Females weigh 23-25 pounds and males slightly more. The coat of some Puli dogs can be different with either thinner or thicker cords which can be flat or round depending on the texture of the coat and the balance of undercoat to outer coat.

The coat is the result of a controlled matting process. Thin, rope-like corded coats are desired and the grooming should control the coat towards the forming of thinner ropes. The Puli's coat needs considerable grooming to keep its cords clean, neat, and attractive. With age, the coat can become quite long, even reaching the ground. Alternatively, the coat can be trimmed short regularly for easy maintenance although the corded coat is what attracts many people to the breed. Contrary to some beliefs, the coat of a healthy Puli will grow out again after trimming. This breed has little to no shedding.

=== Temperament ===
An intelligent and active dog, the Puli needs obedience training while still young. With enough exercise, Pulis can live in the city, but they do best when not kept as indoor pets in small living spaces as, without enough exercise to use up their energy, they can become either shy or overactive. They need to get the kind of exercise they were created for. Pulis are best kept in a house with a garden. Cozy and very friendly especially towards children, they are sensitive and prone to resentment.

=== Activities ===
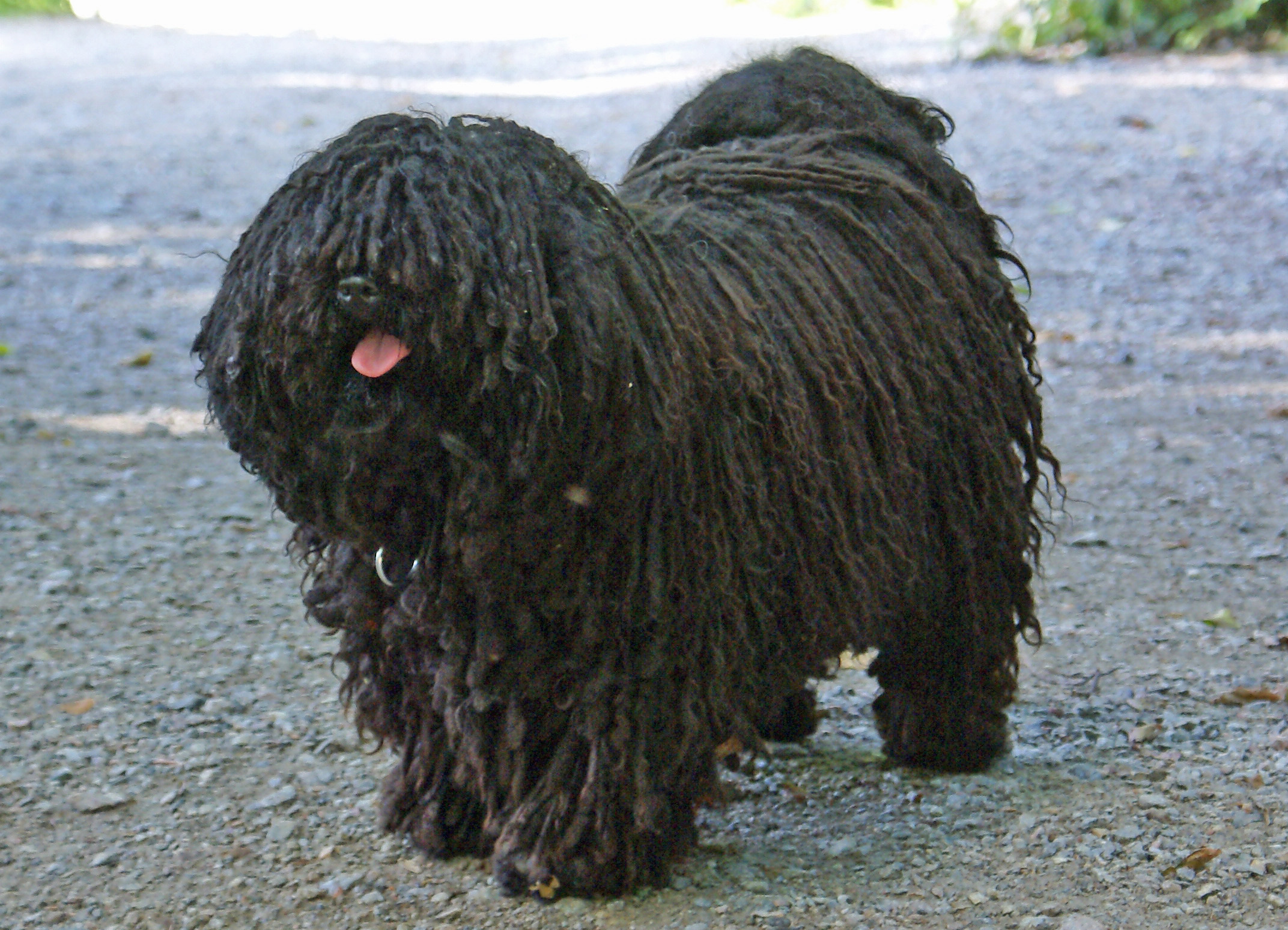

Despite their bulky appearance and very thick coat, Pulis are very fast, agile, and able to change directions rapidly. They are obedient enough to train for athletic competition. Pulis are devoted and form close bonds with their owners.

Traditionally, the Puli dog breed was used as a herding dog and sometimes even as a livestock guarding dog, as well. They make adequate guard dogs, since they are very protective of their masters and territory. The Puli is usually noted to be sensitive, fun-loving, courageous, but also, at times, tough and headstrong.

They are loyal to their owners and wary of strangers. They are highly active and keep a playful, puppy-like behavior their entire lives. They need a lot of exercise and free space, preferably outdoors. They can be trained and housebroken, but Pulis are generally not very well suited as city or indoor pets. When restricted to closed spaces for long periods of times, they grow restless and may develop unwanted personality traits, such as becoming hyperactive or, instead, increasingly aloof and lazy.

As a working dog, the Puli is focused and determined when assigned a task. Some of them are used as police dogs. As a livestock guarding dog, they are fiercely protective of their territory and flock, and, despite their relatively small size, will fearlessly try to scare and drive any intruder away; however, they very rarely inflict any real injuries.

Pulis can compete in dog agility trials, obedience, Rally obedience, showmanship, flyball, tracking, and herding events. Herding instincts and trainability can be measured at noncompetitive herding tests. Pulis exhibiting basic herding instincts can be trained to compete in herding trials.

=== Training ===
Pulis are valued for their energy, determination, and herding instincts that reflect their origins. Early training and socialization is recommended, particularly obedience training, as the breed is known for its independence and strong-willed nature.

== History ==
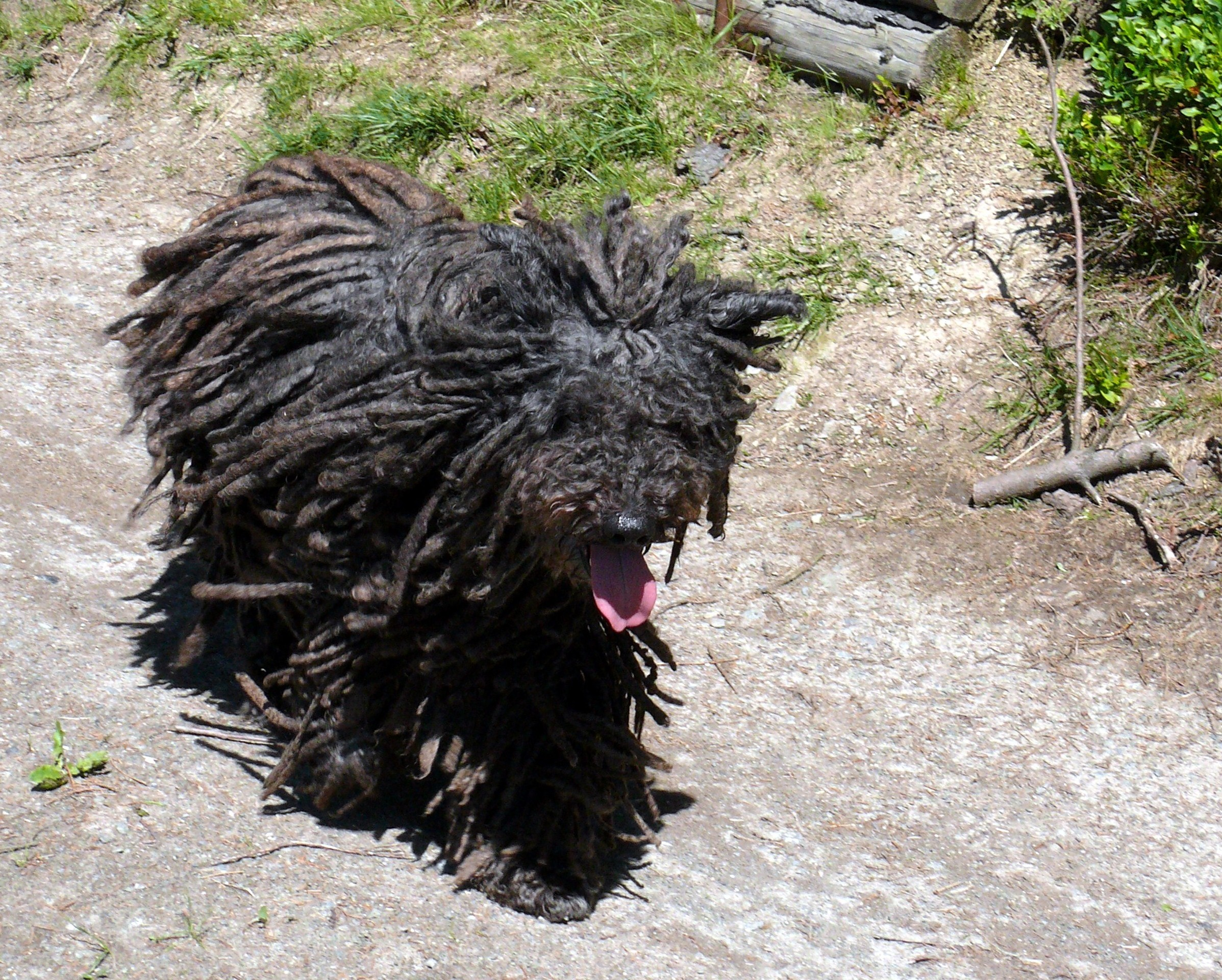
Pulis are very fast and agile

The Magyars probably brought the Puli to Hungary in the 9th Century when they invaded westwards from Siberia, and it has been a sheepdog on the Hungarian plain since then. According to the Encyclopedia of the Dog, the puli is "almost certainly" the ancestor of the poodle. The breed was first studied by Dr Emil Raitsitz from Hungary's veterinary college in the 1920s.

The Puli would commonly work together with the much larger, white Komondor, a Hungarian breed of (solely) livestock guardian dog. The Komondor is a large, solidly built dog, around 30 inches tall. The Komondor (or several Komondors if there was a large amount of livestock) guarded the sheep or cattle mostly at night, while the Puli herded and guarded them during the day.

When wolves or bears attacked the livestock, the Puli would alert the pack and the Komondors would come and fight the intruders. Pulis can be good at fighting off wolves, because the thick coat protects their skin from being bitten. The Komondors usually rested during daytime but at night walked around the flock, constantly moving, patrolling the area.

Nomadic shepherds of the Hungarian plains valued their herding dogs, paying as much as a year's salary for a Puli.

Although the coats may look slightly similar, the Puli has never worked in water and the Puli's coat does not grow continuously in the same fashion as a corded Poodle's coat once the cords are formed.

Possibly the Puli's ancestors are ancient Hungarian shepherd dogs. Travelers brought the Puli with them to the Carpathian basin, to help organize the flocks and herd the stallions of the area. Large Komondor or Kuvasz were used for guarding the flock. The Puli was also a suitable guard for flock protection but was primarily used for herding the animals. Around the beginning of the 20th century, a real turning point for the breed came when it was rediscovered but no longer used much as a sheepdog; extensive shepherding was replaced by intensive farming. The Puli's role was reduced in the life of the flock. Although their traditional duty was kept, they started to fulfil jobs that were convenient in the circumstances of their owner: they became house dogs. After World War II, the breed became a less popular pet; even now, the breed has not been able to regain the popularity it previously enjoyed.

The U.S. Department of Agriculture imported four purebred Pulis in 1935 to Beltsville, Maryland as part of an experiment when trying to help American agriculturists concerned with the problem of herding dogs which sometimes killed the animals to which they had been entrusted to control. The Pulis were bred among themselves and crossed with the German Shepherd, the Chow Chow and perhaps with two Turkish sheepdogs which were quartered there at the time. On the tests given by researchers there, Pulis scored, on the average, between 75 and 85, where other herding breeds, scored in the range of 12 to 14. Because tests were inconclusive, they were never published. When WWII broke out, the Pulis were auctioned off to professional breeders, and, it is thought that, it is from these four dogs and their progeny that history of the Puli in the United States began.

== Photo gallery ==
White and black Pulis

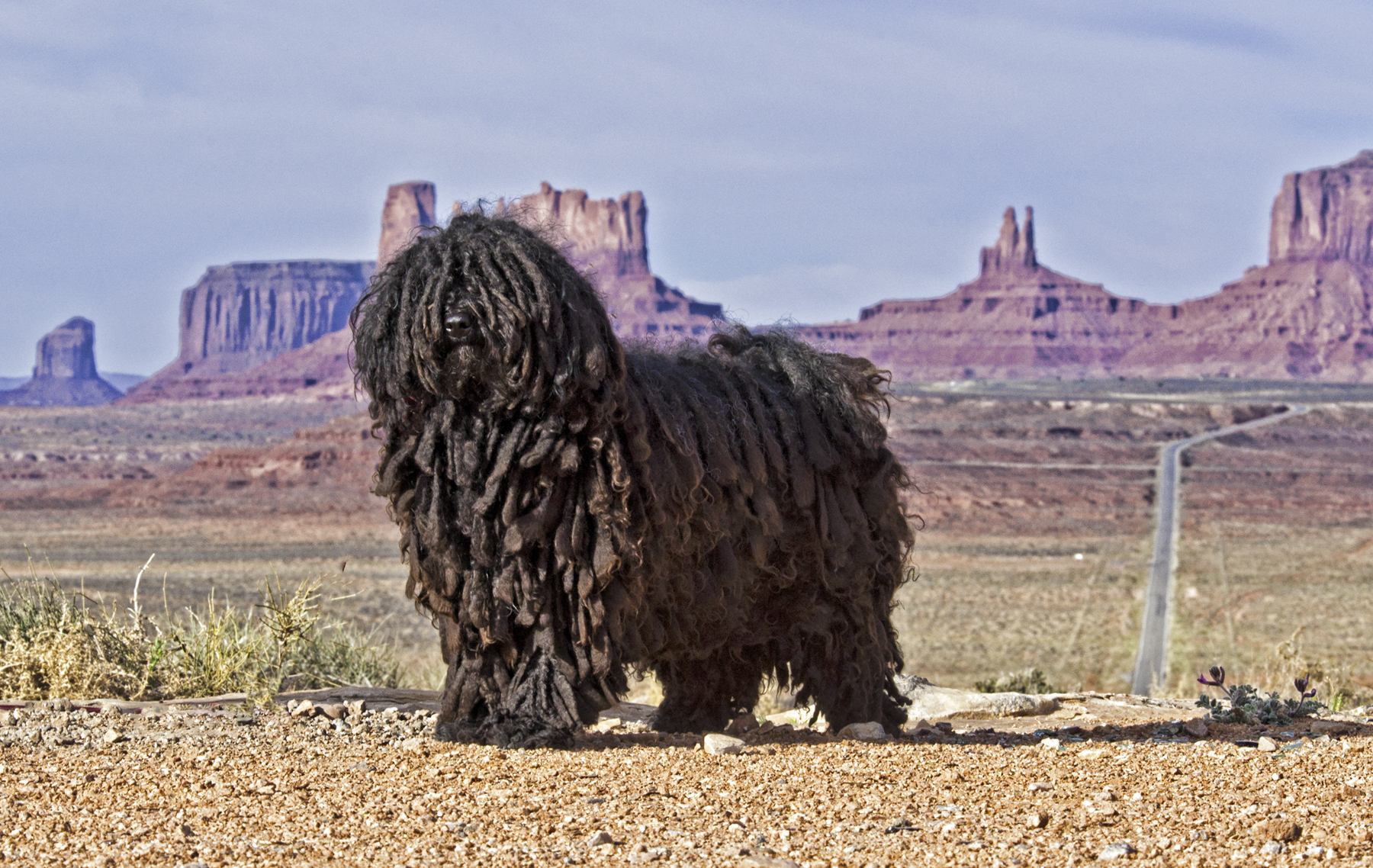
Black Puli

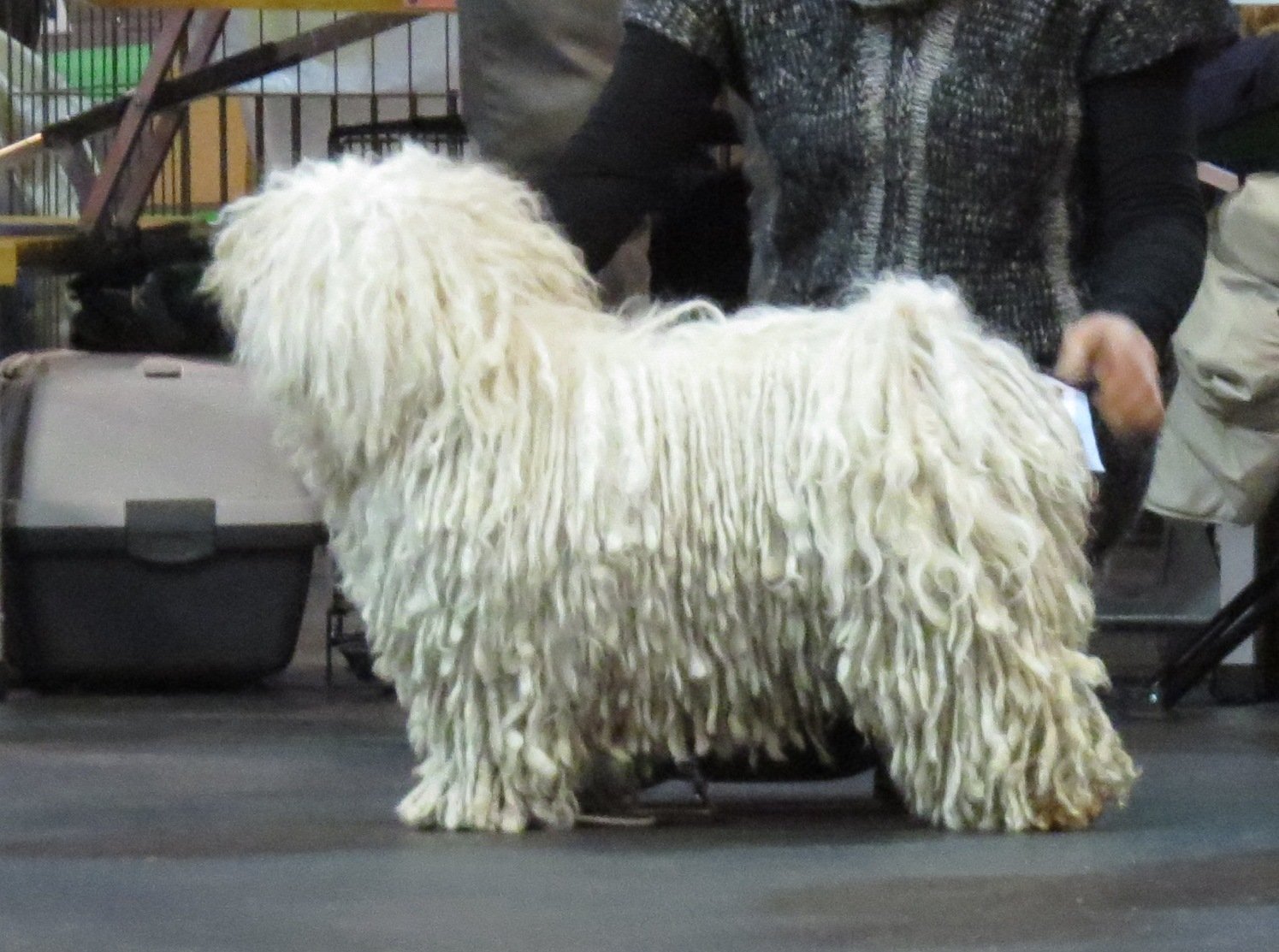
Puli at a dog show

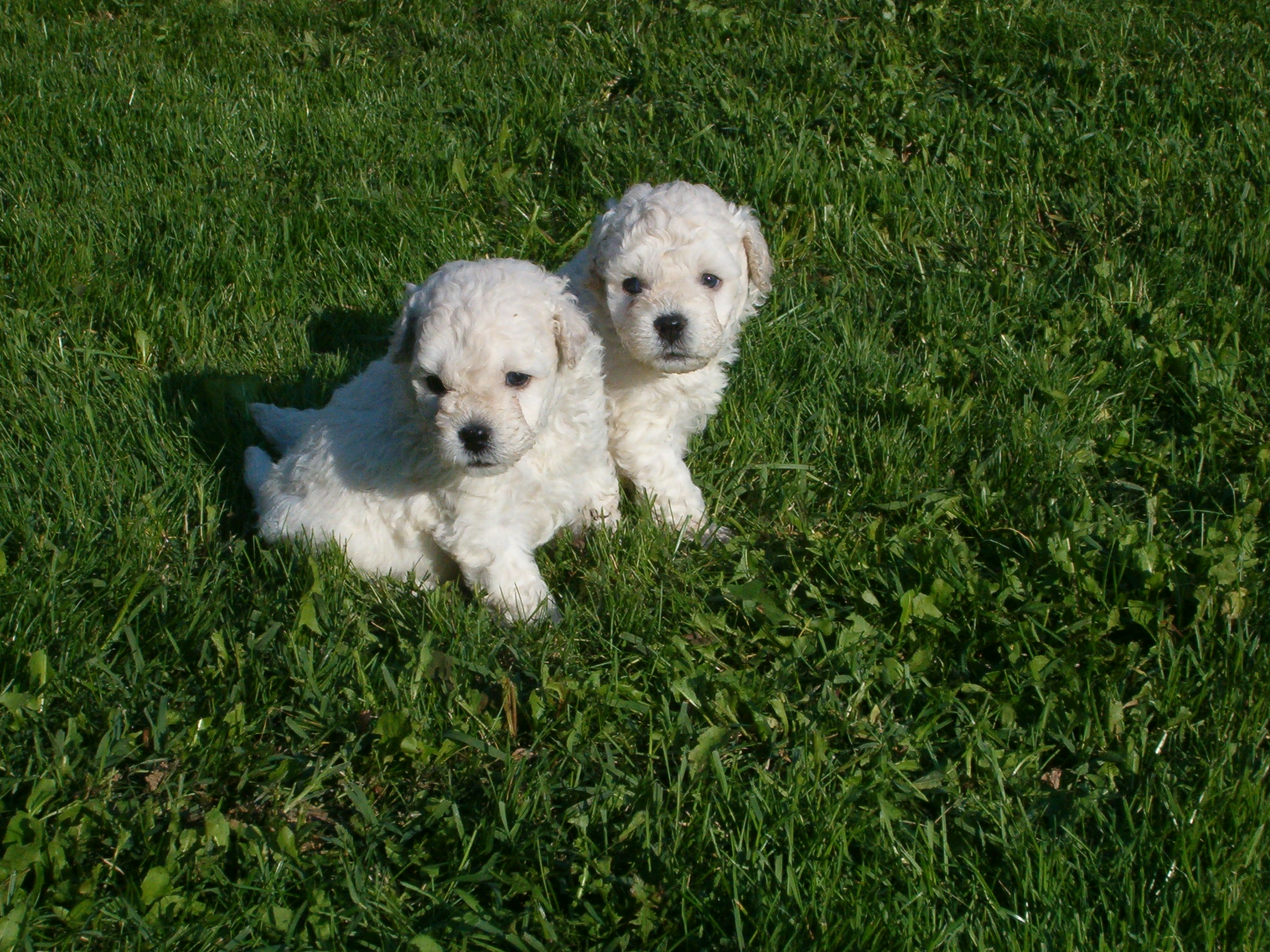
White Puli puppies

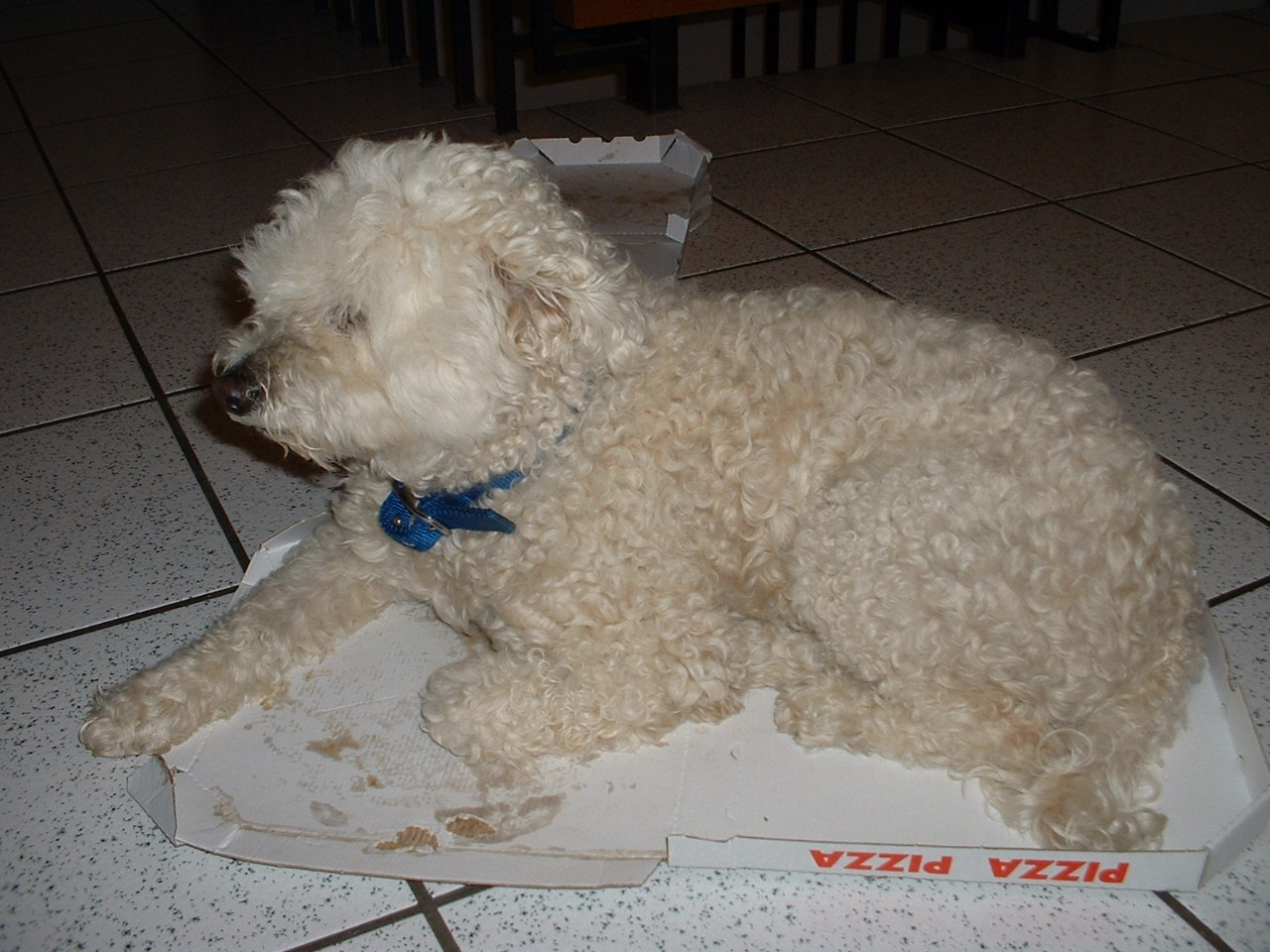
Some owners choose to clip Puli coats to help keep the dog cool in hot weather

== See also ==
- Hungarian dog breeds
- List of dog breeds
