= Cording (surname) =

Cording is a surname. Notable people with the surname include:

- Ann-Marie Cording (born 1959), English high jumper
- George Cording (1878–1946), Welsh cricketer
- Harry Cording (1891–1954), English-born American actor
- Jamie Cording (born 1989), English rugby league player
- Ray Cording (1933–2013), English rugby league player
