= Anthony Rubio =

American fashion designer

- Born: New York City, United States
- Occupation: Fashion designer
- Years active: 2005-present

Anthony Rubio is an American fashion designer, best known for creating costumes for dogs. His designs have been exhibited at events like New York and Los Angeles Fashion Weeks, and have appeared in magazines like Vogue, Cosmopolitan, Vanity Fair, Harper's Bazaar and Elle.

== Biography ==
=== Early life and career ===
Rubio, of Puerto Rican descent, was born and raised in New York City. He became interested in women's fashion as a child, so he studied fashion design. After rescuing a chained Chihuahua in 2005, he began creating costumes for dogs, an activity for which he is most recognized today.

In 2012 he became the first canine designer to exhibit his work at the New York Fashion Week. A year later he participated in the Brooklyn Fashion Week, another event that had never featured designs exclusively for dogs. He has also participated in other major events such as the Met Gala (where he paid tribute to designer Rei Kawakubo) and Los Angeles Fashion Week. In 2021 he participated again in the NY Fashion Week, where he was supported by Polish model Joanna Borov.

His designs have appeared in specialized magazines like Vogue, Cosmopolitan, Vanity Fair, Harper's Bazaar, Marie Claire and Elle; and he has given interviews on TV shows like Good Morning America, Page Six TV, Vice Live, To Tell the Truth and The Pet Show.

=== Other projects ===
Rubio supports dog adoption and has donated to shelters and other projects related to the protection of homeless animals. In 2012 he created the Adopt Me Maybe campaign inspired by the song "Call Me Maybe" by Carly Rae Jepsen, which went viral through social networks. He designed most of the costumes that appear in the book Couture Dogs of New York, by author Paul Nathan.

In addition to his canine designs, Rubio also designs haute couture for women and ties for men.
