= Joanna Borov =

Polish model

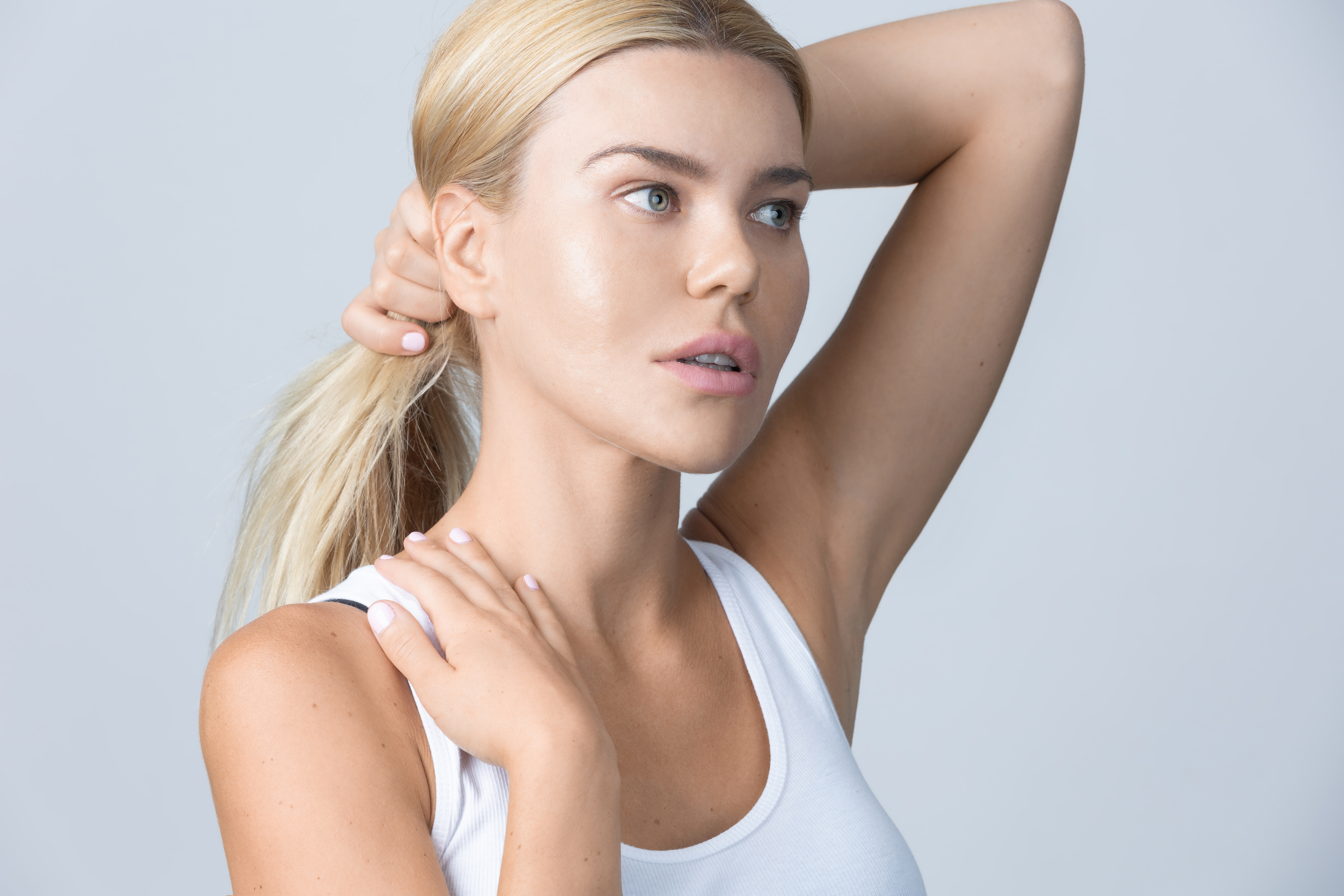
- Born: Poland
- Education: University of Warsaw
- Modeling information
- Height: 1.73 m (5 ft 8 in)
- Hair color: Blonde
- Eye color: Blue

Joanna Borov is a Polish model based in Los Angeles, California. During her career she has participated in advertising campaigns for several brands and has participated in fashion weeks in London, Los Angeles, New York and Paris. In 2020 she appeared on the cover of Playboy magazine in its Ukrainian version and has been featured in the pages of other fashion magazines such as Maxim, Vogue, FHM, L'Officiel and Marie Claire.

== Biography ==
=== Early life and career ===
Borov was born in Poland, but emigrated to the UK after completing a master's degree in law at the University of Warsaw. In London she continued her academic training, entering the University of the Arts London. Around the same time she began her career as a model, working with major brands on advertising campaigns and appearing at events such as Paris, Los Angeles and London fashion weeks.

=== Popularity ===
In 2018 she won the Miss Motors Formula 1 Silvestone and World Beauty Queen Poland beauty pageants, representing her country in the Word Beauty Queen event held in South Korea the same year. In 2019 she was invited to participate as a member of the jury of the Miss Film Festival International contest in Argentina, and during her stay in that country she participated in advertising campaigns with several local brands.

The same year she traveled to the United States to sign with modeling agencies in Los Angeles and New York. In 2020 she appeared on the cover of Playboy magazine in its Ukrainian version, and was featured on the pages of other magazines specialized in fashion such as FHM, Vogue, Maxim, L'Officiel and Marie Claire. In July 2021 she participated in the Miami Swim Week, and in September she walked the runway at the New York Fashion Week with designs created by Anthony Rubio. Borov currently writes books on nutrition, runs a blog on healthy living, is the founder of a children's fashion design company using organic materials, and works on projects for the adoption of homeless animals.
