= Tony Paskins =

Australian RL coach and former rugby league footballer (1927–2019)

Personal information
- Full name: Anthony Heather Paskins
- Born: 5 December 1927
- Died: 15 August 2019 (aged 91)

Playing information
- Position: Centre
Club
Years	Team	Pld	T	G	FG	P
1948–55	Workington Town	247	99	71	0	439
1955–58	Eastern Suburbs	54	12	105	0	246
1958–63	Oberon
1963–64	Manly-Warringah	17	0	4	0	8
	Total	318	111	180	0	693
Representative
Years	Team	Pld	T	G	FG	P
1948–55	Other Nationalities	11	2	0	0	6
1954	Rugby League XIII
1957	British Empire

Coaching information
Club
Years	Team	Gms	W	D	L	W%
1963–64	Manly-Warringah	36	12	1	23	33
1973	Eastern Suburbs	22	12	0	10	55
	Total	58	24	1	33	41

Tony Paskins (5 December 1927 – 15 August 2019) was an Australian rugby league footballer who played in the New South Wales Rugby League (NSWRL) and English Rugby Football League (RFL) competitions as well as playing rugby union for the Randwick club in Sydney.

== Playing career ==
Paskins was recruited from Sydney's Randwick rugby union club by English rugby league club Workington Town. Tony Paskins played right-centre in Workington Town's 18–10 victory over Featherstone Rovers in the 1951–52 Challenge Cup Final d at Wembley Stadium, London on Saturday 19 April 1952, in front of a crowd of 72,093. He was a founder member of Other Nationalities against English national sides playing in the first Other Nationalities game in 1949.

Tony Paskins played right-centre and kicked three-conversions in Workington Town's 12–21 defeat by Barrow in the 1954–55 Challenge Cup Final at Wembley Stadium on Saturday 30 April 1955, in front of a crowd of 66,513.

A goal kicking three-quarter back, Paskins returned to Australia, along with fellow Australian and Workington Town teammate Rupert Mudge in 1955. Paskin was named captain of Eastern Suburbs side, playing 54 matches for the club in the years (1955–58). After leaving Easts he enjoyed success with the local Oberon side in rural New South Wales. In 1961 he was named as the captain of the Country New South Wales rugby league team and the following year captained New South Wales against the touring Great Britain national rugby league team although he was never selected to play for the Australian national team.

== Coaching career ==
Paskins returned to the NSWRL in 1963 where he spent 2 seasons as joint captain and coach of the Manly-Warringah club.

Paskins moved to Forster, New South Wales in 1967 and took over as captain-coach of the Forster Tuncurry Hawks in 1968. He guided the side to premierships in that year, the 1969 grand final and 1970.

Tony Paskins coached the Sydney Roosters club in the 1973 NSWRFL season.
