= Norman Mitchell (rugby league) =

English rugby league footballer

Playing information
- Position: Wing
Club
Years	Team	Pld	T	G	FG	P
1951–55/56	Featherstone Rovers	85	15	33	0	111

Norman Mitchell was a professional rugby league footballer who played in the 1950s. He played at club level for Featherstone Rovers, as an occasional goal-kicking wing.

== Club career ==
Mitchell made his début for Featherstone Rovers on Saturday 8 December 1951, and he played his last match for Featherstone Rovers during the 1955–56 season.

=== Challenge Cup Final appearances ===
Mitchell played on the wing in Featherstone Rovers' 12–18 defeat by Workington Town in the 1952 Challenge Cup Final during the 1951–52 season at Wembley Stadium, London on Saturday 19 April 1952, in front of a crowd of 72,093.
