= Dog fashion =

Style in which people dress their dogs

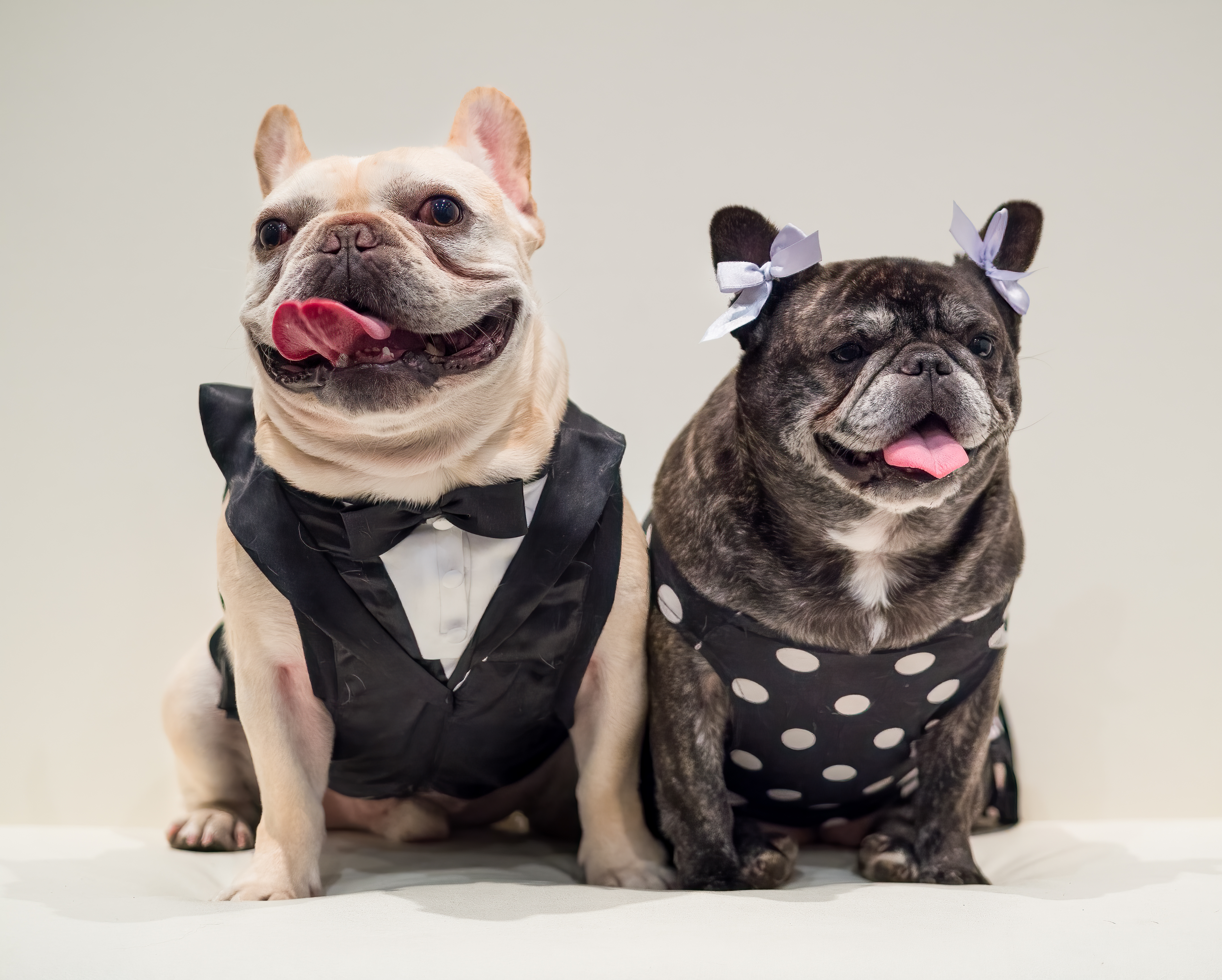
Two bulldogs in costume at PetCon 2018 in New York

Dog fashion is a popular style or practice, especially in canine clothing and accessories. Dog fashion is a distinctive trend of the style in which people dress their canine companions. This trend dates back to the Egyptian predynastic period and has since expanded due to increased consumer capitalism. Other animals such as cats may also wear fashion.

== History ==
There is evidence from ancient Egypt that people were using decorative collars to adorn their dogs. One collar was discovered in the tomb of the ancient Egyptian nobleman Maihar Piri in 1440 BC. It depicts hunting scenes embossed into leather. The dog's name, Tantanuit, is visible on the collar. He was a favorite dog of the nobleman who wished to bring him to the afterlife. There are also silver, gold, silk and velvet decorative dog collars from the time of King Henry VIII which were used to represent how many battles the dog survived. During the Renaissance, dogs were seen as objects of possession and thus collars were fitted with padlocks where only the owner of the dog had the key. Nobility and the upper class have been decorating their canine companions for centuries and there is photographic evidence from 1900 of people dressing their dogs in human costumes. Today, it is common for people to dress up their dogs, particularly small dogs, and canine clothing has become a global phenomenon. In 2011, there was a dog fashion show in New York called Last Bark at Bryant Park.

Dog fashion and style has been greatly influenced with the advent of the internet. New professions have arisen driven by consumer capitalism, such as the pet style expert.

== Clothing ==
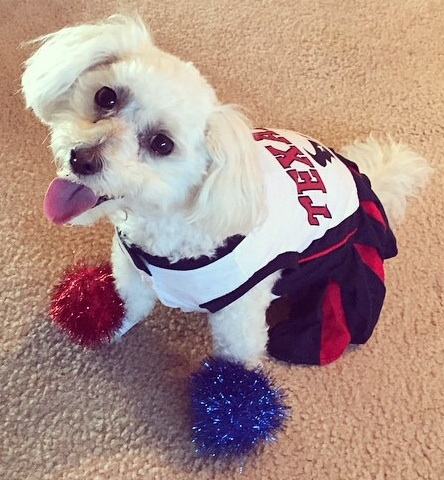
Dog dressed as a Texans cheerleader as a Halloween costume

Dog clothes are available in various price ranges, from inexpensive to high-end designer styles. Typically toy and small breeds of dogs, such as Chihuahuas and Yorkshire Terriers, are dressed in dog clothes, although even large breeds like Golden Retrievers can wear clothes, too. It is more common to dress small dogs because they are easier to dress and they often suffer from cold temperatures. Dog clothes are made to be either functional or for show. Functional dog clothes are for protection from the elements and allergens. Dog clothes that are purely for show would be used as costumes for holidays and special occasions, such as Halloween or weddings.

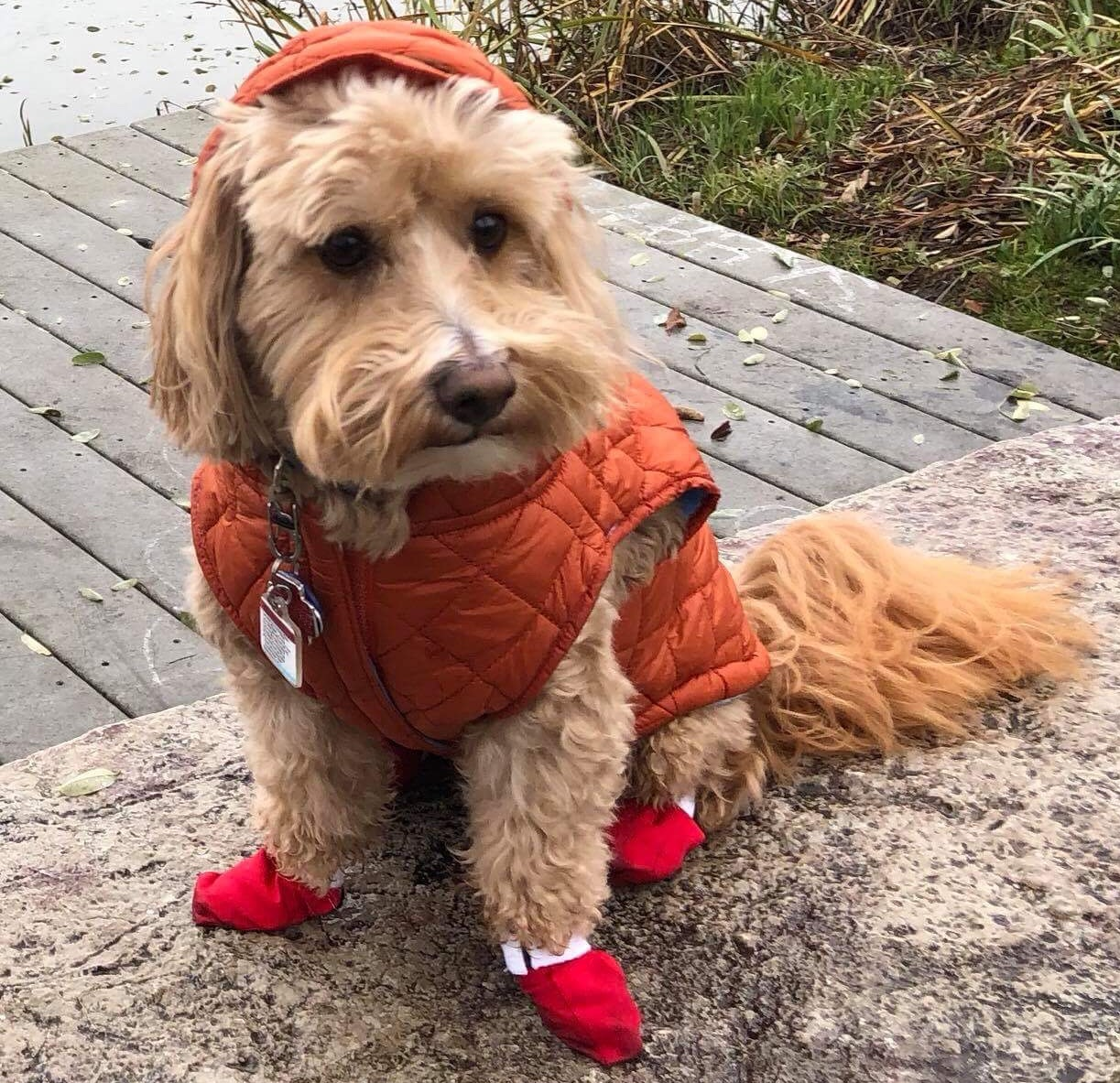
A hooded gilet designed to be worn by small dogs

Dog coats are most commonly used for protection against rain and cold and to provide extra warmth. Dog coats are also used as fashion accessories.

Dog sweaters are both functional and fashion accessories. They provide extra warmth for dogs that are hairless or suffer from the cold and come in an array of patterns and styles, such as cable knitted sweaters or hooded sweatshirts with embellishments.

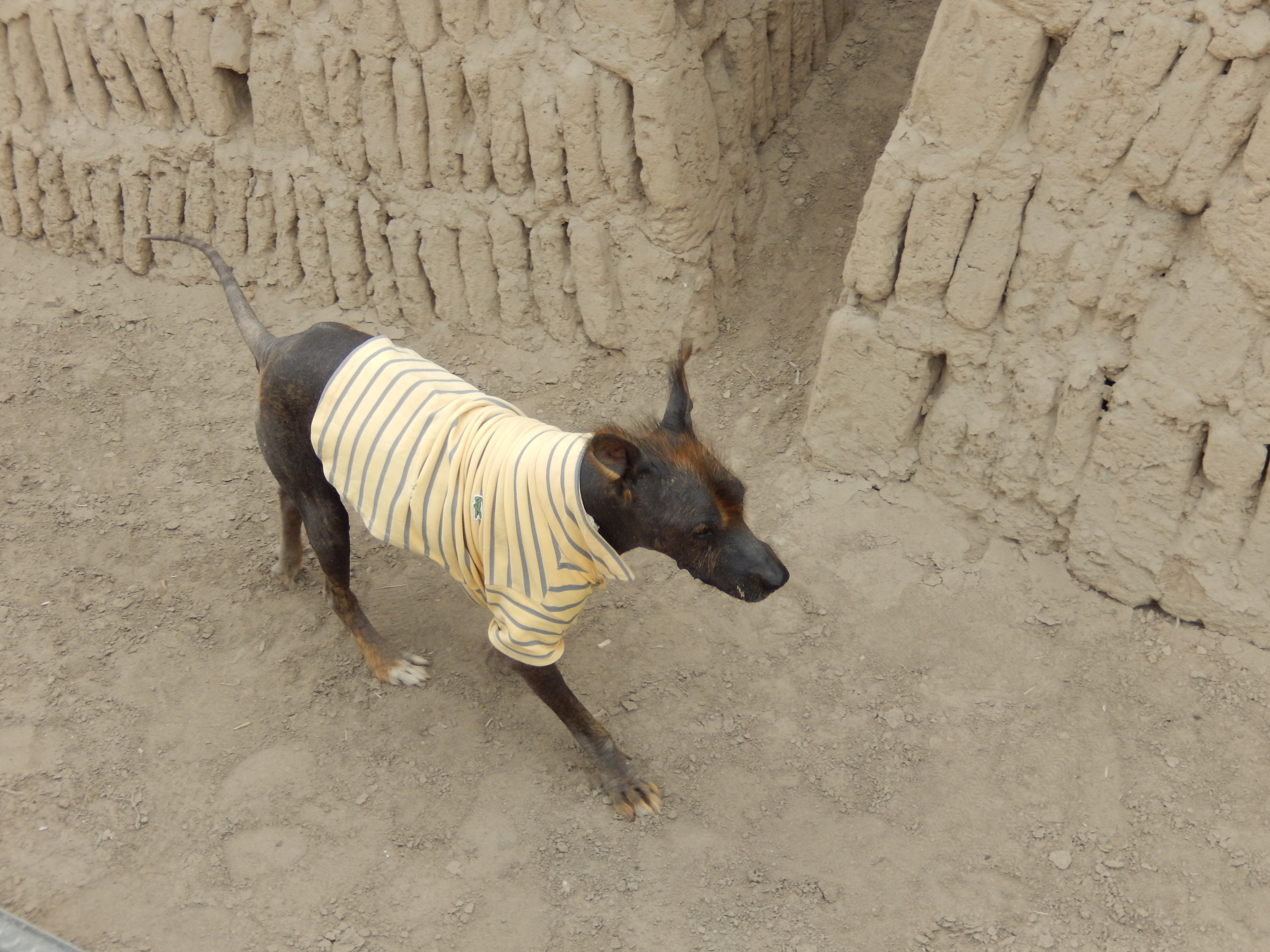
A hairless dog wearing an adapted human polo shirt for protection

Dog shirts can be used to help keep a dog clean and as fashion accessories. They can also be used to help protect a dog who is excessively scratching itself due to allergies or prevent hairless dogs from getting sunburned. They are available in a t-shirt style with short or long sleeves as well as a sleeveless tank top for use during warmer weather.

Dog dresses are purely fashion accessories and are mainly worn on toy and small breeds of dogs.

Dog tuxedos also exist. Some people may involve dogs in formal-wear at their weddings, whether in photos, parties, or at the ceremony itself. There has been at least one documented case of a dog serving as the owner's best man. Dog hats are an alternative to clothes if dogs get too warm wearing garments. Dog hats can be worn for warmth or for aesthetics. One hat trend has holes for pointy eared dogs. This allows owners to dress up their dog without disguising the breed.

== Fashion shows ==
There is a clear distinction between pet shows and pet fashion shows. The pet fashion show's emphasis is on the clothes, not on the dog. In countries all over the world, pet fashion shows are becoming increasingly popular. During these shows, well groomed pets strut down the runway wearing high fashion clothes. Some well known designers such as Alexander Wang have designed outfits for dogs. Anthony Rubio, a New York designer, was the first to hold a canine fashion show at New York Fashion Week.

== Designer fashions ==
Dog coats, collars, cute sweaters, shirts, stylish dresses, and booties are some of the items people purchase to adorn their dogs with style. Some major international fashion retailers such as Ralph Lauren have launched their own canine clothing lines. Louis Vuitton has a line of leashes and collars for dogs with their trademark LV pattern. Swarovski also has a line of collars and leashes for dogs with crystals.

== Statistics ==
The canine fashion industry has become a multi-billion dollar business set to top £30 billion in 2015. In the US, expenditure on pet supplies, including clothing, has been steadily increasing for the last twenty years with 2014 estimated spending at $13.72 billion. As of 2014, an estimated 26.7 million US households owned a dog, and an estimated 83.3 million dogs were kept as pets in the United States. The dog fashion industry is projected to continually grow.

In 2021, the pet apparel market was valued at $5.7 billion, with dog owners accounting for the majority of sales.

== Sociological perspective ==
Humans typically have deep attachments to their dogs because dogs are adept at fulfilling emotionally supportive roles in people's lives which results in high levels of attachment. Dog owners who are single, childless, newly married, empty nesters, divorced, or in a second marriage tend to anthropomorphize their pets more often. Dogs can be emotional substitutes for family members such as children and spouses and they contribute to the moral maintenance of people who live alone.

Dogs have become increasingly important and treated as unique individuals. In a world where people are increasingly disconnected from their families, they rely more on their pets, specifically dogs, to fill emotional voids. Pets have become a relatively easy replacement for children or a strong community.

Humans have been dependent on animals as sources of companionship and artistic inspiration since the Paleolithic period, and animals have continued to mold the shape of human culture and psychology ever since.

=== Consumer capitalism viewpoint ===
Increasing affluence means that more people can spend resources on items that are not necessary, like clothes and costumes.

People express themselves through fashion. As Georg Simmel says, "Style is the manifestation of our inner feelings and through style we demonstrate our taste, values, and status. We project all of those qualities onto our dogs when we dress them."

The appearance of a dog reflects the status of the owner: dressing a dog is more about the owner than the animal. When an owner dresses up their dog they establish a unique bond with the dog that places them at an even more personal and intimate level.

== Media ==
Dogs are often shown in movies dressed up in clothing and costumes. This reflects the contemporary trend of dog fashion. In films such as Oliver and Company, one of the characters is a female dog, Georgette, who indulges in luxury fashion and wears leopard print scarves, big hats, and jeweled collars.

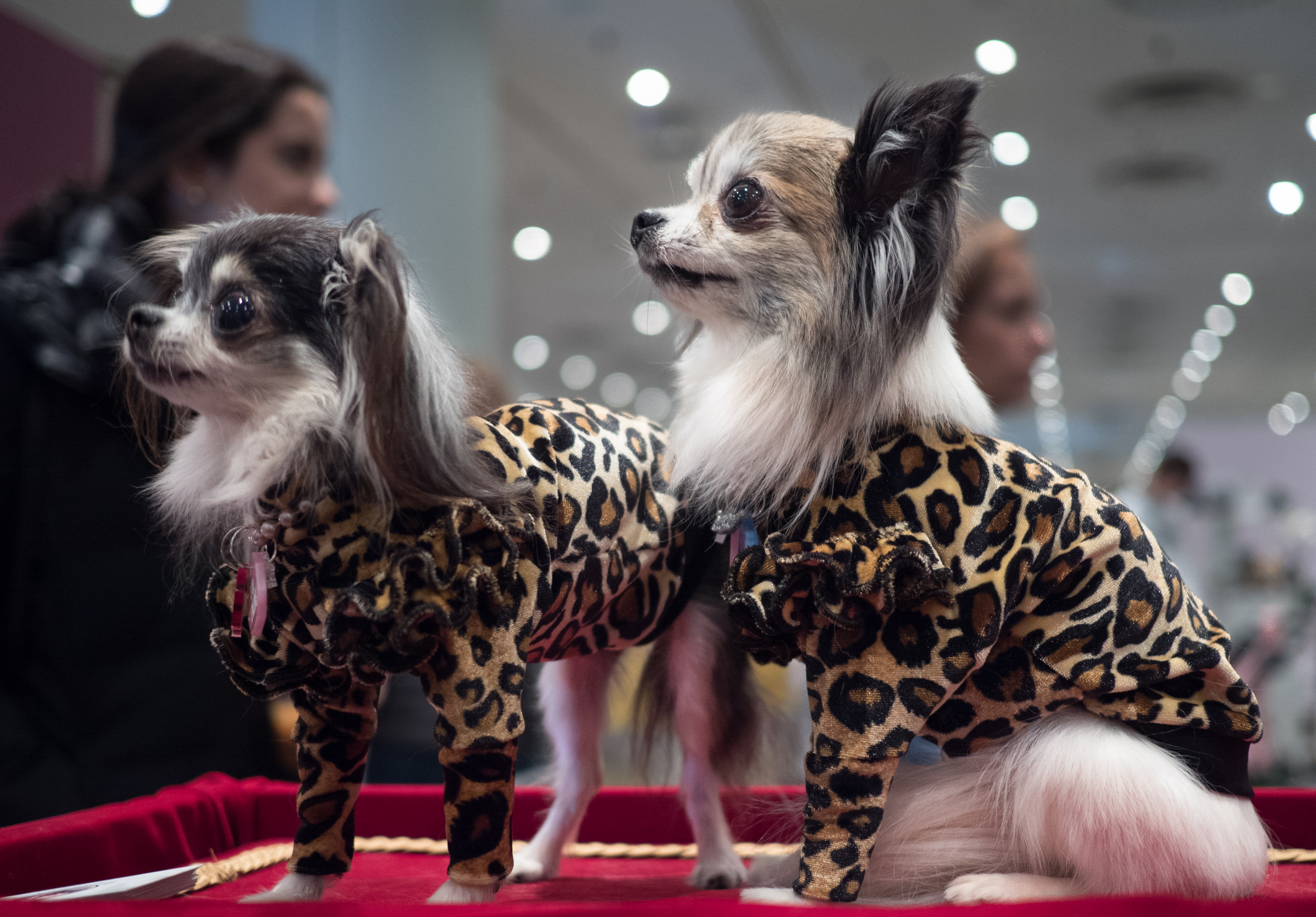
Two chihuahuas wearing clothing.

In the Disney film Beverly Hills Chihuahua, a family of chihuahuas portray small dogs wearing clothes including sunglasses, hats, shirts, dresses, jeweled collars, and bandanas. In one scene, a wedding takes place between two dogs where the female dog wears a bridal gown and the male dog groom wears a tuxedo.

A popular trend in various kids films, dogs are shown with the capability of human speech and dressed up in human clothing while remaining quadrupedal. An example of this would be Air Bud (1997). The film centers around an escaped circus dog turned adopted stray that is taken to a basketball court and is discovered to have incredible talent in the sport. Throughout the film, the dog is shown in various human outfits and attire.

== See also ==
- Collar (animal)
- Fashion show
- Georg Simmel
