= George Wilson (1940s rugby player) =

GB international rugby league footballer

Personal information
- Born: Scotland

Playing information

Rugby union
- Position: Wing
Club
| Years | Team | Pld | T | G | FG | P |
|---|---|---|---|---|---|---|
| ≤1947–48 | Kelso RFC |
Representative
| Years | Team | Pld | T | G | FG | P |
| 1947 | South of Scotland | 3 | 0 | 0 | 0 | 0 |

Rugby league
- Position: Wing
Club
| Years | Team | Pld | T | G | FG | P |
|---|---|---|---|---|---|---|
| 1948–50 | Huddersfield |
| 1950–55 | Workington Town | | 129 |
| 1955 | Salford |
| | Total | 0 | 129 | 0 | 0 | 0 |
Representative
| Years | Team | Pld | T | G | FG | P |
| 1949 | Other Nationalities | 1 | 1 | 0 | 0 | 3 |
| 1951 | Great Britain | 3 | 5 | 0 | 0 | 15 |

George Wilson, also known by the nickname of "Happy", was a Scottish rugby union and professional rugby league footballer who played in the 1940s and 1950s. He played representative level rugby union for South of Scotland, and at club level for Kelso RFC, as a wing, and representative level rugby league for Great Britain and Other Nationalities, and at club level Workington Town, as a wing.

== Playing career ==
=== Club career ===
Wilson was signed by English rugby league club Huddersfield in October 1948. In February 1950, after losing his place in the first team, Wilson was transfer listed at his own request, and was signed by Workington Town for a fee of £2,750.

Wilson played left wing and scored a try in Workington Town's 18–10 victory over Featherstone Rovers in the 1951–52 Challenge Cup Final at Wembley Stadium, London on Saturday 19 April 1952, in front of a crowd of 72,093.

He joined Salford in 1955.

=== International honours ===
In rugby union, Wilson represented South of Scotland while at Kelso RFC. In rugby league, he played for Other Nationalities in 1949 while at Huddersfield, and won caps for Great Britain while at Workington in 1951, playing in all three Tests against the touring New Zealand team. Wilson scored three tries in the first test.
