= Bevan Wilson (rugby, born 1927) =

Australia international rugby union & league player

Personal information
- Full name: Bevan John Wilson
- Born: 20 September 1927; Strathfield, Sydney, Australia
- Died: 11 May 2012 (aged 84)

Playing information

Rugby union
- Position: Prop
Club
Years	Team	Pld	T	G	FG	P
194?	Gordon RFC
Representative
Years	Team	Pld	T	G	FG	P
1949	Australia	2				0

Rugby league
- Position: Prop, Second-row
Club
Years	Team	Pld	T	G	FG	P
1950–??	Workington Town	49
Representative
Years	Team	Pld	T	G	FG	P
1953	Other Nationalities	3	0	0	0	0

Coaching information
Club
Years	Team	Gms	W	D	L	W%
196?–??	Gordon RFC

Bevan John Wilson (20 September 1927 — 11 May 2012) was an Australian rugby union international and rugby league footballer.

Born in Sydney, Wilson was educated at North Sydney Technical High School, after which he briefly worked designing ordnance survey maps. He played his rugby for Gordon, linking up with his former schoolmate Trevor Allan.

Wilson, a loosehead prop, played in both Test matches on the 1949 tour of New Zealand, which the Wallabies won 2–0 to claim an away Bledisloe Cup series for the first time.

Accepting an offer from an English scout, Wilson left Australia in 1950 to play rugby league for Workington Town as a second-rower. He was a member of Workington Town's 1951–52 Challenge Cup final win over Featherstone Rovers.

Wilson, who returned home in the mid-1950s, was later the principal of Marrickville Public School. He coached Gordon to two Shute Shield grand finals during the late 1960s.

== See also ==
- List of Australia national rugby union players
