= Ken Welburn =

English rugby league footballer

Personal information
- Full name: Kenneth Welburn
- Born: 1929 (age 95–96)

Playing information
- Position: Prop
Club
| Years | Team | Pld | T | G | FG | P |
|---|---|---|---|---|---|---|
| 1948–58 | Featherstone Rovers | 263 | 12 | 0 | 0 | 36 |

Kenneth Welburn (born third quarter 1929) was an English professional rugby league footballer who played in the 1940s and 1950s. He played at club level for Featherstone Rovers (captain during the 1954–55 season), as a prop.

== Playing career ==
Welburn made his début for Featherstone Rovers on Saturday 20 November 1948.
