= Dog grooming =

Care and cleaning of a dog

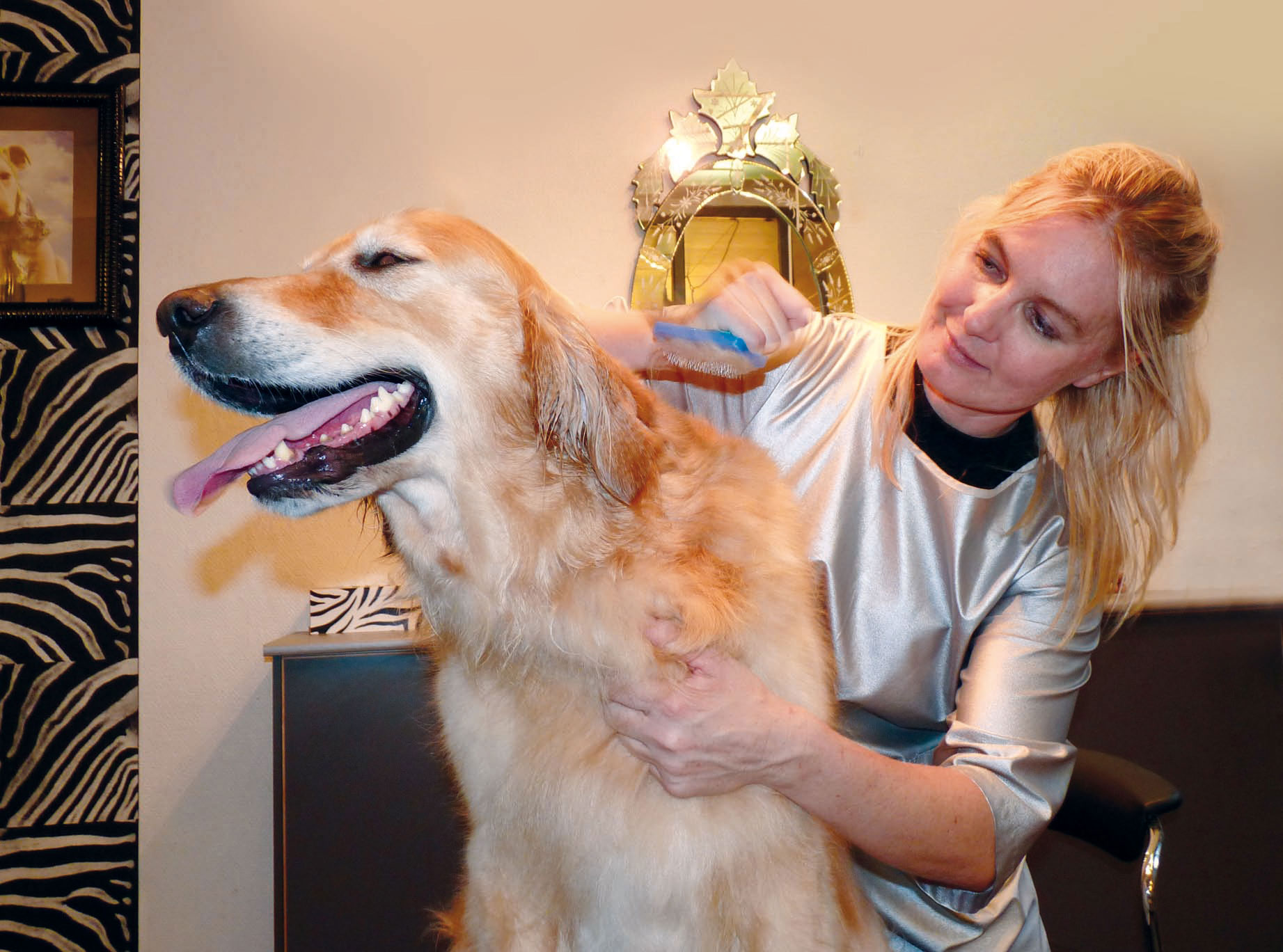
A groomer brushing a Golden Retriever.

Dog grooming refers to the hygienic care of a dog, a process by which a dog's physical appearance is altered or enhanced. A dog groomer (or simply "groomer") is a professional that is responsible for maintaining a dog’s hygiene and appearance by offering services such as bathing, brushing, hair trimming, nail clipping, and ear cleaning.

Similarly to grooming humans and other animals, grooming dogs is an act of service to aid the dog in its course of shedding its fur, trimming its nails and tending to any skin concerns. The act of care may require different tools, such as clippers, shears and brushes. Dog grooming can be done in a household setting with cursory knowledge of the act, yet dog salons or mobile grooming trailers and vans, with professionally trained dog groomers, can provide a more thorough service, especially for certain long haired breeds.

The earliest record of grooming dogs was found to be between 1500 and 1600 A.D. Throughout history working dogs were groomed for work efficiency, while cosmetic grooming later grew popular in 16th century Europe.

== Purpose ==
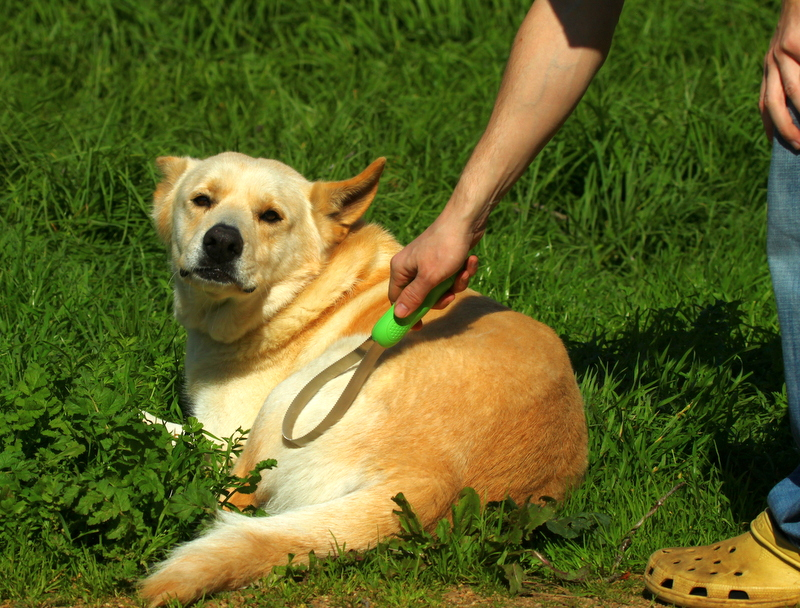
Grooming a dog using a shedding blade

Grooming dogs can have multiple benefits for them, and almost all dogs have some form of grooming done in their life time. Some of the main purposes of grooming a dog is to clean the coat, maintain it, cut unnecessary length, and removing mats. Matting in dogs fur, tangled clumps of hair, is a common side effect of a lack of grooming and cleaning, and can cause discomfort, skin irritation and even disease. Due to this and other health concerns that can arise because of neglect, dog grooming is seen as essential. Depending on the breed, some dogs may need special or alternative approaches to grooming; for example, poodles require a different approach compared to a dog with straighter hair. This also applies to dogs who have health issues or are seniors.

A large portion of dog grooms are for the health and comfort of the dog. Cosmetic desires are often correlated to the dog's respective breed standard and environment. Some countries, such as Korea and Japan, are known for certain cosmetic styles.

Dog grooming can be looked at as a form of animal husbandry and has its sociology rooted in anthrozoology.

== History ==
The history of dog grooming is one that lacks a field of study, yet some observations have been made throughout history that allow us to understand how the service has developed. Ancient Egyptian art suggests that dogs were cleaned for worshiping purposes. Between 1500 and 1600 A.D, Curly Coated Retrievers were one the first identifiable breed of dog to receive grooming from their human owners. Author Gervase Markham wrote how the dogs were used and trained in the 1620s. This was done to help the dogs swim better in water to retrieve hunted animals, a solution to a hunting problem, and not as a health or cosmetic solution.

Grooming evolved over time from practical reasons to cosmetic ones, due to a well-groomed dog being a status symbol amongst European aristocracy during the 1700s. King Louis XVI of France was particularly fond of the poodle; as a result, French groomers specialized in creative cosmetic patterns for the poodle, helping it become France's national dog. During the 1800s, many books regarding dog grooming arose, giving general dog bathing advice.

Dog grooming continued to reach new cosmetic heights within the higher social classes and until the late 19th Century and early 20th, dog grooming was a luxury amongst dog owners. Since the 1920s and on-wards, dog grooming has become a regular facet of life in owning a dog. Today, All dog breeds are studied and styled precisely with the help of state-of-the-art equipment and resources. Groomers work in a variety of environments, such as private salons, pet stores, kennels, and veterinary clinics.

== Tools and supplies ==
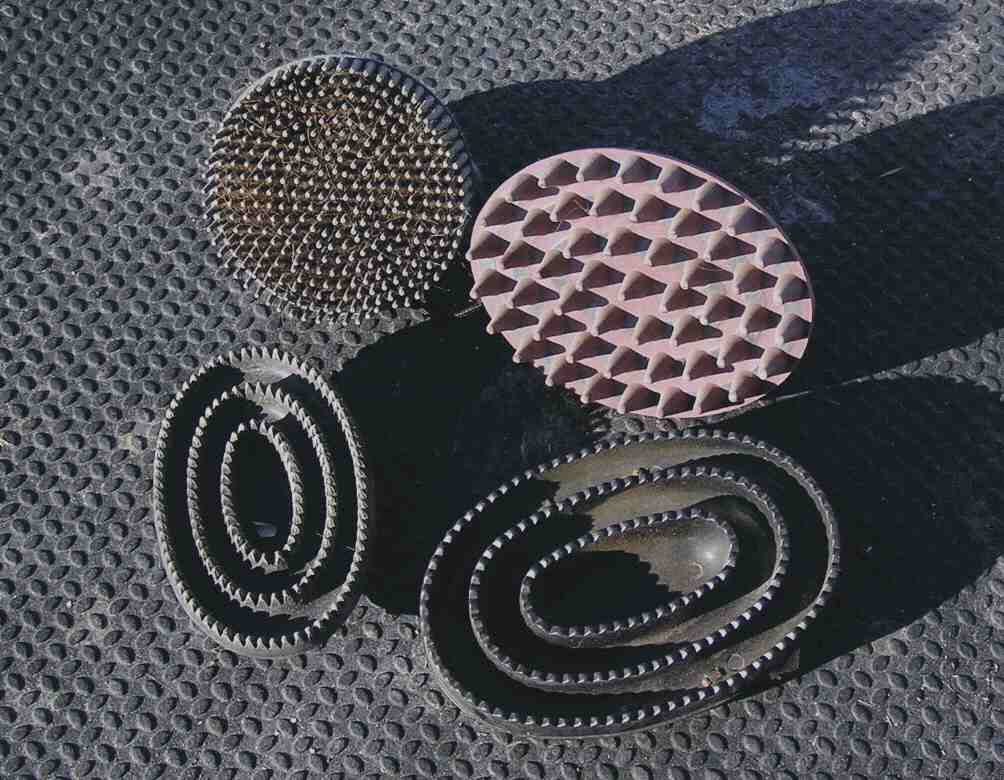
Various types of curry brushes

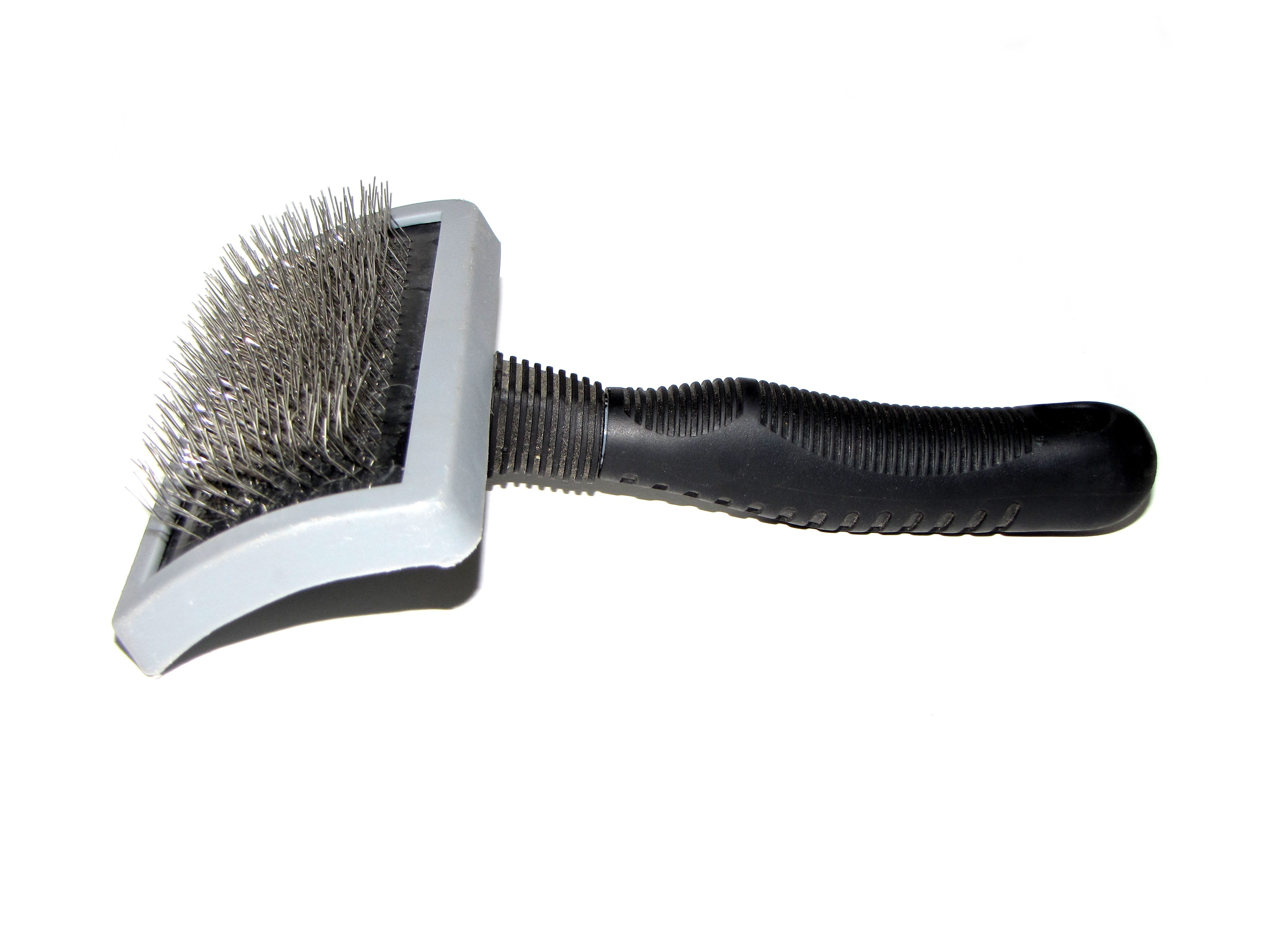
Slicker brush used for removal of loose hair and knots

Groomers use a variety of tools to help aid the process of grooming. Brushes, blades, combs, shears, nail cutters or grinders are all used by the groomer. Brushes and combs may vary in material depending on coat type. Some shorter haired dogs, like pit bulls, would benefit from the use of a curry brush, since it is made of rubber. Slicker brushes are used for longer haired dogs, undercoat removal, and de-tangling. Combs are used to detect tangles and remove them, as well as smoothing the fur. Greyhound combs are the industry standard comb for this purpose. Some de-shedding tools are blades, using a serrated blade to comb through fur.

Shears and clippers are used to remove fur by the means of cutting, not de-shedding. Cordless mechanical clippers are industry standard, along with shears fulfilling multiple grooming desires, such as curved shears being used to reach a cosmetic goal.

Various types and sizes of nail trimmers vary from dog to dog. Nail trimming is done with a nail clipper. There are two main types of nail clippers: guillotine trimmers and standard scissor- and plier-style trimmers. The scissor-style trimmer is most effective on nails that have grown too long and are now in the shape of a circle or coil. In addition, handheld rotary tools are often used to smooth sharp edges caused by nail clippers.

== Services and techniques ==
=== Bathing ===
Dogs can be bathed indoors in a sink, walk-in shower, or bathtub or outdoors using a garden hose. The water should be warm enough to prevent hypothermia but not hot enough to scald the skin. Dogs with heavy or matted coats should never be bathed without first being completely brushed out or first clipping/cutting any mats.

Many types of shampoos and conditioners formulated for dogs are available. For dense and double-coated dogs, pre-mixing the shampoo with water will help ensure a more even distribution of the shampoo. When washing the head, grooming products can be irritating if they come in contact with the eyes. Additionally, excess water may become trapped in the ear canal, leading to secondary ear infections. If the shampoo is not fully rinsed off, residual chemicals may become irritating to the skin. Most dogs do not require frequent bathing; shampooing a coat too often can strip the coat of its natural oils, causing it to dry out.

=== Dental care ===
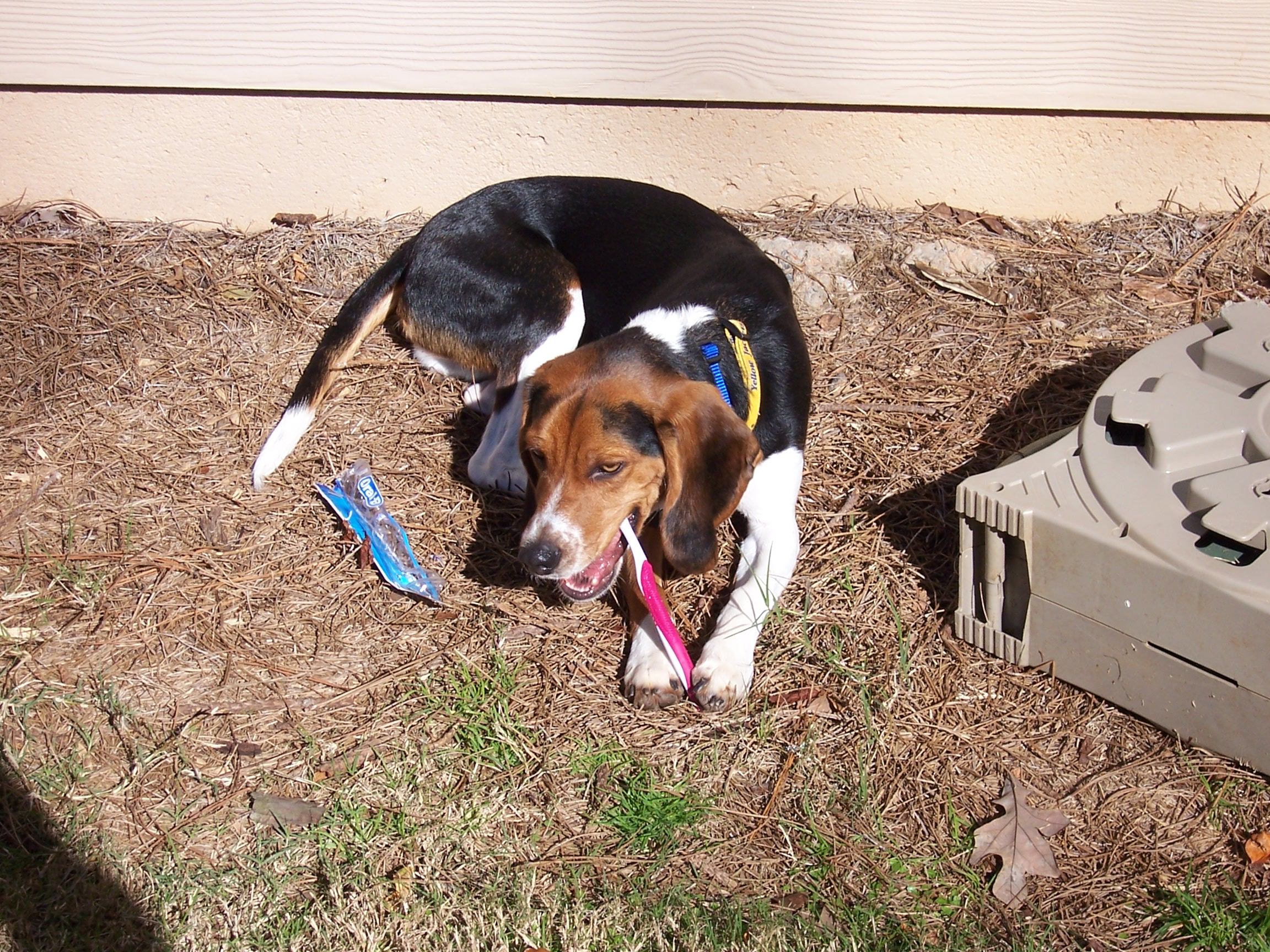
A Beagle chewing on a toothbrush

Dental care is particularly important and can be addressed while grooming. The dental kits available on the market include everything from special toothpaste to toothbrushes. Many models of toothbrushes include a flexible three-head design, which maintains the proper pressure on all surfaces of the tooth with every stroke. These brushes have side bristles set at 45-degree angles to reduce arm twisting and soft outer bristles for massaging the gums. Toothpaste designed to be used on dogs is usually sugar-free toothpaste with different flavoring. Foaming or rinsing is not necessary.

=== Hair removal ===
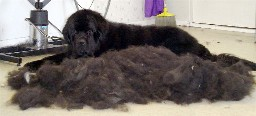
A Newfoundland dog lying next to its combed-out seasonal undercoat

The coats of many breeds require trimming, cutting, or other attention. Styles vary by breed and discipline. While some hair removal originates for practical purposes, much of it is based on the owner's taste, whether the dog will be shown, and the type of work it does.

Rubber grooming gloves and dog brushes are designed to remove loose hair from short-coated dogs and are among the most popular grooming tools for pet owners. They are easy to use by massaging the coat in firm strokes and are suitable for both wet and dry coats.

Some breeds, such as the Lhasa Apso, do not shed but have hair that grows constantly. Consequently, the fur around their legs and belly can become exceptionally long and matted, while the hair around their eyes can obstruct vision. In these cases, hair trimming is necessary to keep the eyes clear and the coat free of knots. A dog vacuum can also be useful for managing loose hair and keeping the coat clean.

=== Hand stripping ===
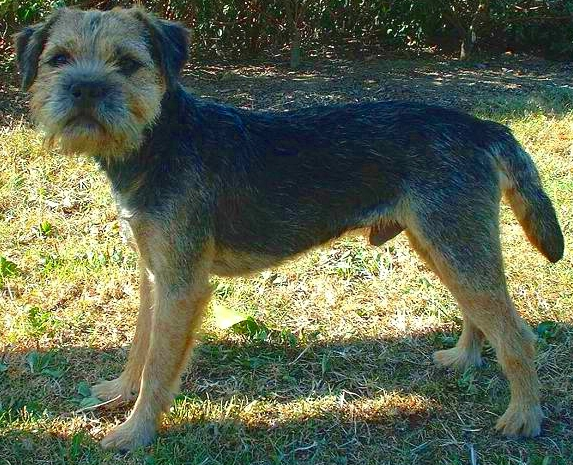
The body of this adult Border Terrier has been stripped.

Stripping or hand-stripping is the process of pulling the dead hair out of the coat of a non-shedding dog, either by using a stripping knife or the fingers. A hard, wiry coat has a cycle where it starts growing and then sheds as it reaches maximum length. Hand-stripping coordinates the shedding and makes room for a new coat to grow. Stripping is the proper grooming method for most terriers, spaniels, and many other breeds. The hair is removed with either a stripping knife or stripping stone, with the top coat removed to reveal the dense, soft undercoat. If done correctly, the procedure is painless. Many dogs are reported to enjoy having their hair stripped, especially when they are introduced to it as puppies.

=== Nail trimming ===
Nail trimming is essential for maintaining good health. If a dog's nails are allowed to grow, they will curl over into a spiral shape and walking will become increasingly painful and dangerous. Uncut nails may curl so far that they pierce the paw pad, leading to infection and debilitating pain. Long nails can put pressure on the toe joints, even causing the joints of the forelimb to be realigned. This can cause the animal to have unequal weight distribution and be more prone to injuries. Longer nails are also more likely to be forcibly ripped or torn off, causing serious pain to the animal.

It becomes increasingly difficult to maneuver nail clippers between the paw pad and tip of the nail as the nails grow longer. Owners may choose to trim nails themselves or may opt to take their pet to a groomer or veterinarian.

=== Cording ===
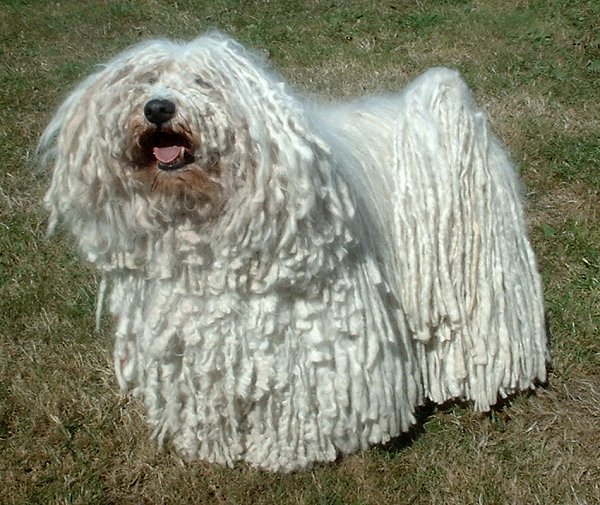
The Puli's corded coat requires a large amount of patient grooming to keep it attractive.

Cording is a technique in which dog coats are separated patiently into dreadlocks for coat care or presentation purposes. Some dog breeds that are often corded are the Puli and the Komondor. The Havanese and the various poodles are also occasionally corded for showing.

The cords form naturally (if messily) in tightly curled fur, but to make them attractive for conformation showing, the cords are carefully started by separating clumps of fur in a regular pattern, and tended until they are long enough to grow on their own. A corded coat can act like a dust mop as the dog moves through its environment, causing debris such as dirt and leaves to be tangled in the coat. To keep the coat attractive, the owner must put in considerable time and effort in cleaning it and in entertaining and exercising the dog in a way that minimizes the accumulation of litter. Such dogs often have their cords tied up or covered with assorted dog clothing when they are not in a clean environment.

== Creative changes ==
Additional options that some groomers provide include services such as fur coloring and painting dogs' nails with safe, nontoxic products formulated especially for that purpose.

While traditional grooming achieves to conform with breed standards set by the official breed associations, creative grooming heads to the opposite direction, creating a unique, sometimes exquisite look.

The lighter version of creative grooming is known as pet tuning and is more owner-oriented, adjusting the pets' visual appearance to their owners' amusement or lifestyle, while the creative grooming is more of an art form, therefore more artist (groomer) oriented.

== See also ==
- Dog breeding
- Kennel
- Pet store
