= Wilf Evans =

Wales international rugby union player

- Full name: Wilfred James Evans
- Born: 12 May 1914 Griffithstown, Wales
- Died: 17 November 1992 (aged 78) Pontypool, Wales

Rugby union career
- Position: Prop
International career
Years	Team	Apps	(Points)
1947	Wales	1	(0)

Wilfred James Evans (12 May 1914 — 17 November 1992) was a Welsh international rugby union player.

Evans was born in Griffithstown, a suburb of Pontypool, and played his rugby for hometown club Pontypool RFC.

A Monmouthshire police officer, Evans represented Wales in the 1939-40 Red Cross internationals, an uncapped series for players in the services. His solitary official cap came as a prop in a 1947 Five Nations match against Scotland at Murrayfield, where he packed a front row with Cliff Davies and Billy Gore. He had retained his place for their following fixture in Paris, but due to a knee injury was forced to give up his spot to Dai Jones.

== See also ==
- List of Wales national rugby union players
