= Fred Hulme =

English rugby league footballer

Personal information
- Full name: Fred Hulme
- Born: unknown
- Died: unknown

Playing information
- Position: Second-row
Club
Years	Team	Pld	T	G	FG	P
1951–56	Featherstone Rovers	154	7	0	0	21

Fred Hulme (birth unknown – death unknown) was a professional rugby league footballer who played in the 1950s. He played at club level for Featherstone Rovers.

== Playing career ==
Hulme made his début for Featherstone Rovers on Saturday 17 February 1951, and he played his last match for Featherstone Rovers during the 1955–56 season.

=== Challenge Cup Final appearances ===
Hulme played at second-row in Featherstone Rovers' 12-18 defeat by Workington Town in the 1952 Challenge Cup Final during the 1951–52 season at Wembley Stadium, London on Saturday 19 April 1952.

=== Testimonial match ===
Hulme's benefit season at Featherstone Rovers took place during the 1955–56 season.
