= Ray Cording =

English rugby league footballer

Personal information
- Full name: Raymond Cording
- Born: first ¼ 1933; Pontefract, England
- Died: 2013 (aged c. 79–80)

Playing information
- Position: Wing, Stand-off
Club
Years	Team	Pld	T	G	FG	P
1950–56	Featherstone Rovers	140	34	10	0	122

Raymond "Ray" Cording (first ¼ 1933 – 2013) was an English professional rugby league footballer who played in the 1950s. He played at club level for Featherstone Rovers, as an occasional goal-kicking stand-off.

== Background ==
Raymond Cording's birth was registered in Pontefract, West Riding of Yorkshire, England, he worked as a fitter at Ackton Hall Colliery, and he died aged c. 79–80.

== Club career ==
Raymond Cording made his début for Featherstone Rovers against Batley on Wednesday 30 August 1950, and he played his last match for Featherstone Rovers during 1955–56 season.

=== Challenge Cup Final appearances ===
Cording played stand-off in Featherstone Rovers' 12–18 defeat by Workington Town in the 1951–52 Challenge Cup Final during the 1951–52 season at Wembley Stadium, London on Saturday 19 April 1952, in front of a crowd of 72,093.
