= 1958 =

1958 in various calendars
- Gregorian calendar: 1958; MCMLVIII
- Ab urbe condita: 2711
- Armenian calendar: 1407; ԹՎ ՌՆԷ
- Assyrian calendar: 6708
- Baháʼí calendar: 114–115
- Balinese saka calendar: 1879–1880
- Bengali calendar: 1364–1365
- Berber calendar: 2908
- British Regnal year: 6 Eliz. 2 – 7 Eliz. 2
- Buddhist calendar: 2502
- Burmese calendar: 1320
- Byzantine calendar: 7466–7467
- Chinese calendar: 丁酉年 (Fire Rooster); 4655 or 4448 — to — 戊戌年 (Earth Dog); 4656 or 4449
- Coptic calendar: 1674–1675
- Discordian calendar: 3124
- Ethiopian calendar: 1950–1951
- Hebrew calendar: 5718–5719
- Hindu calendars
- Vikram Samvat: 2014–2015
- Shaka Samvat: 1879–1880
- Kali Yuga: 5058–5059
- Holocene calendar: 11958
- Igbo calendar: 958–959
- Iranian calendar: 1336–1337
- Islamic calendar: 1377–1378
- Japanese calendar: Shōwa 33 (昭和３３年)
- Javanese calendar: 1889–1890
- Juche calendar: 47
- Julian calendar: Gregorian minus 13 days
- Korean calendar: 4291
- Minguo calendar: ROC 47 民國47年
- Nanakshahi calendar: 490
- Thai solar calendar: 2501
- Tibetan calendar: མེ་མོ་བྱ་ལོ་ (female Fire-Bird); 2084 or 1703 or 931 — to — ས་ཕོ་ཁྱི་ལོ་ (male Earth-Dog); 2085 or 1704 or 932

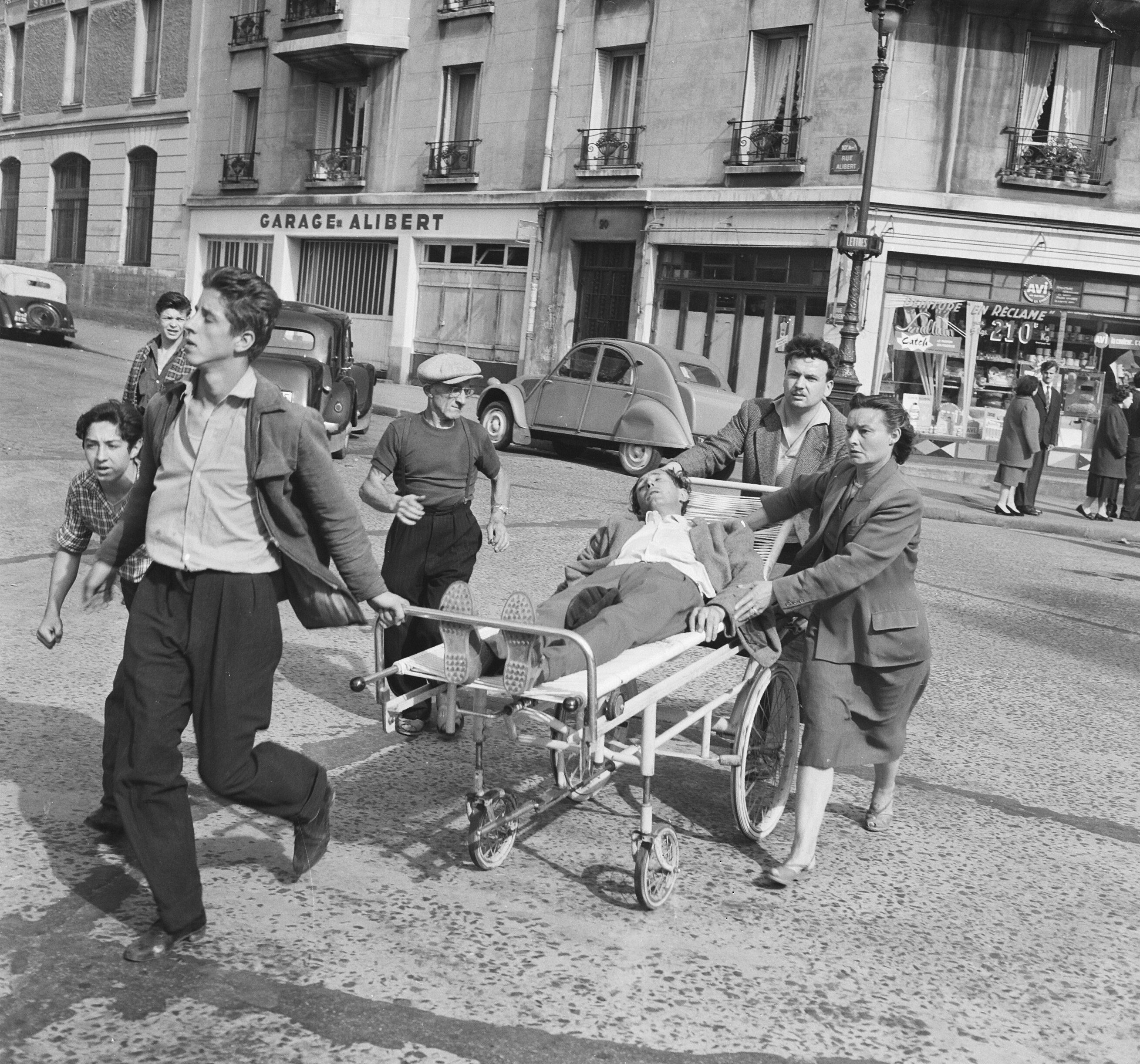
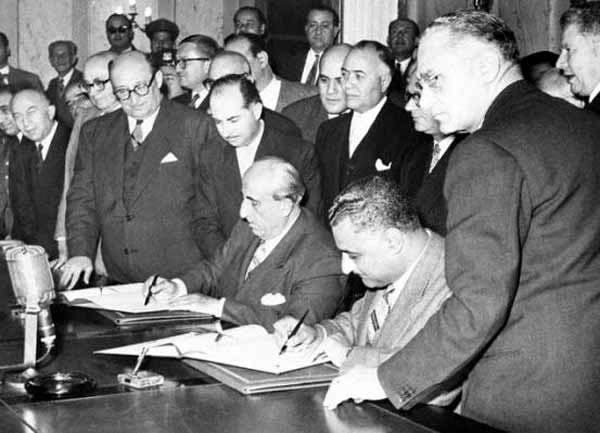
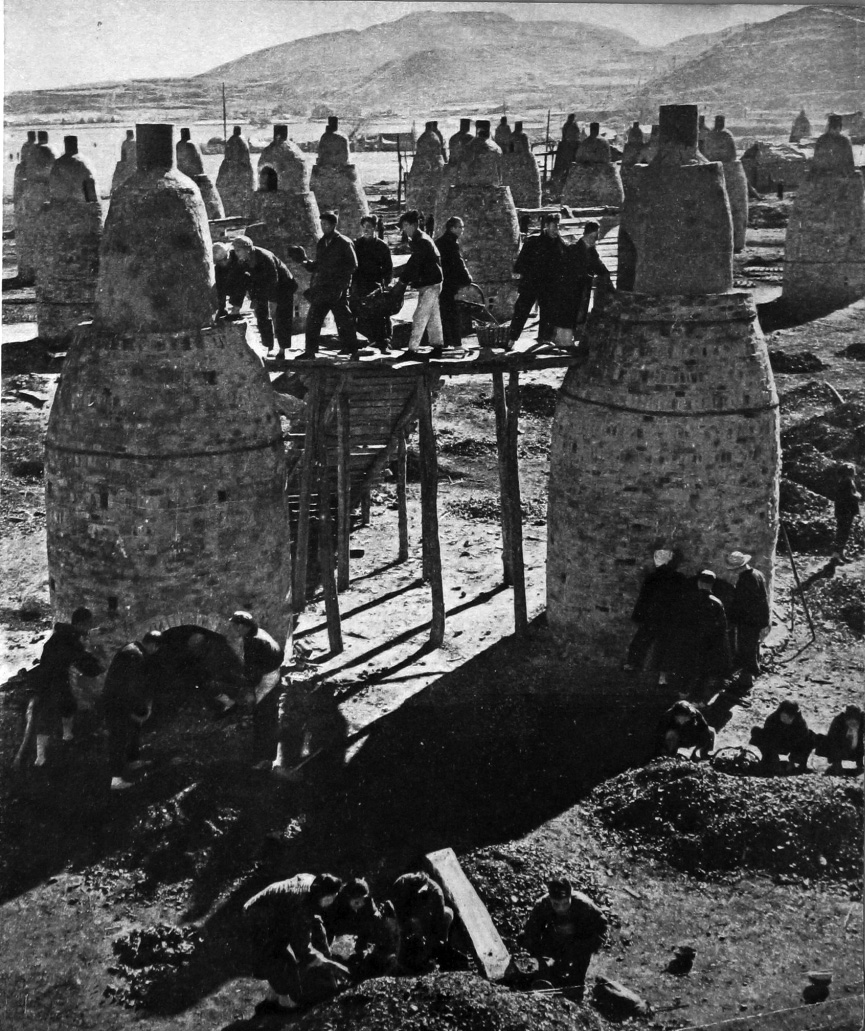
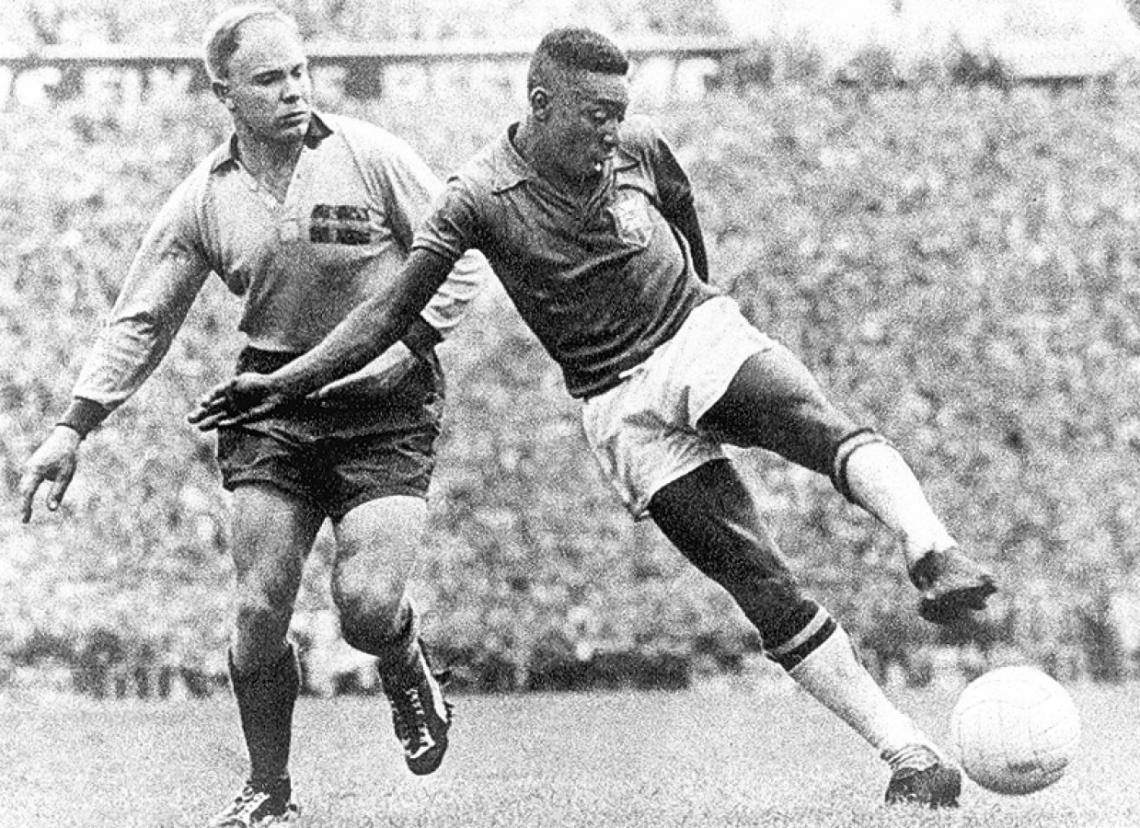
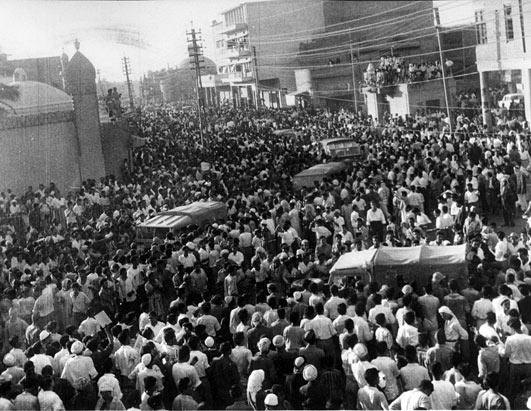
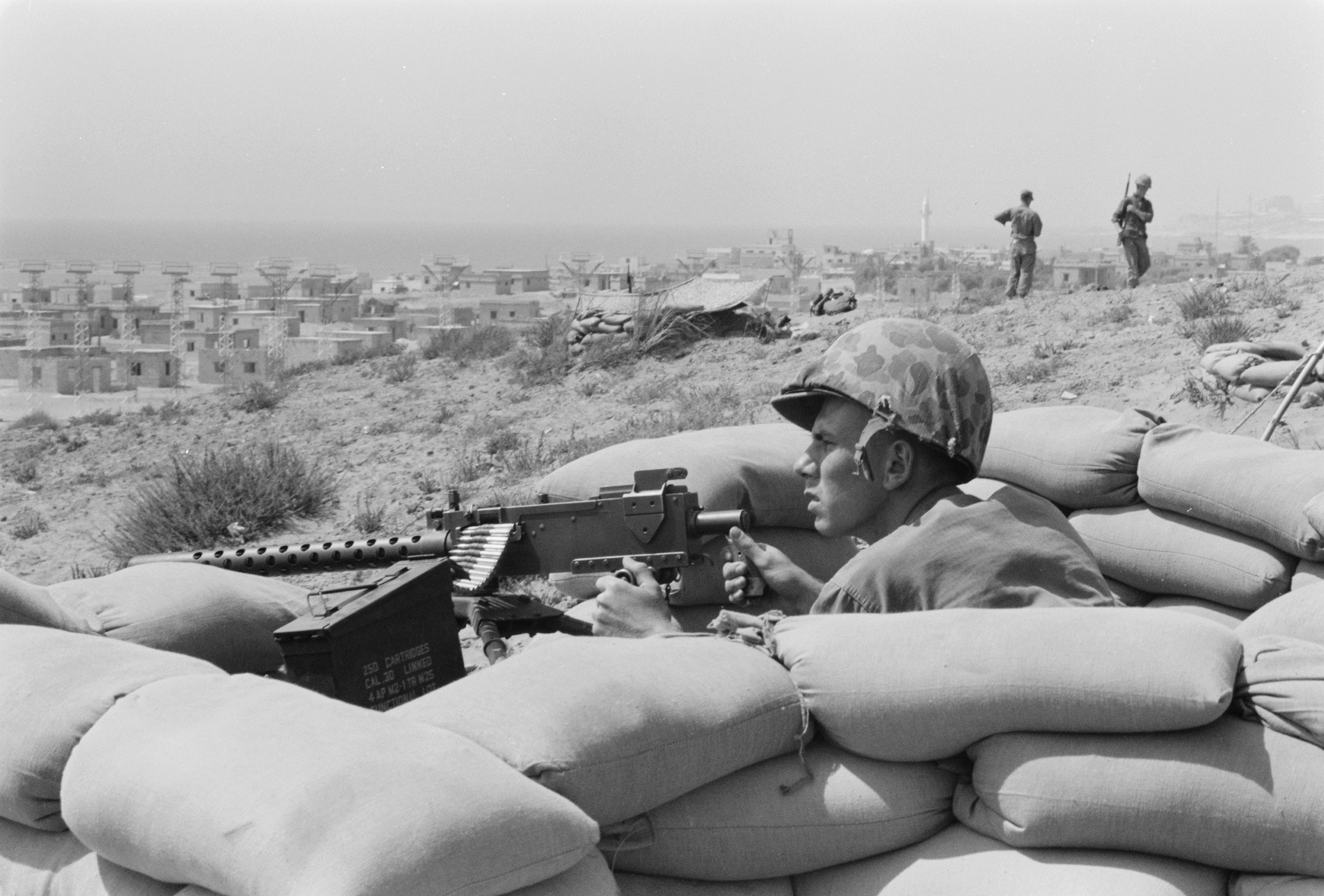
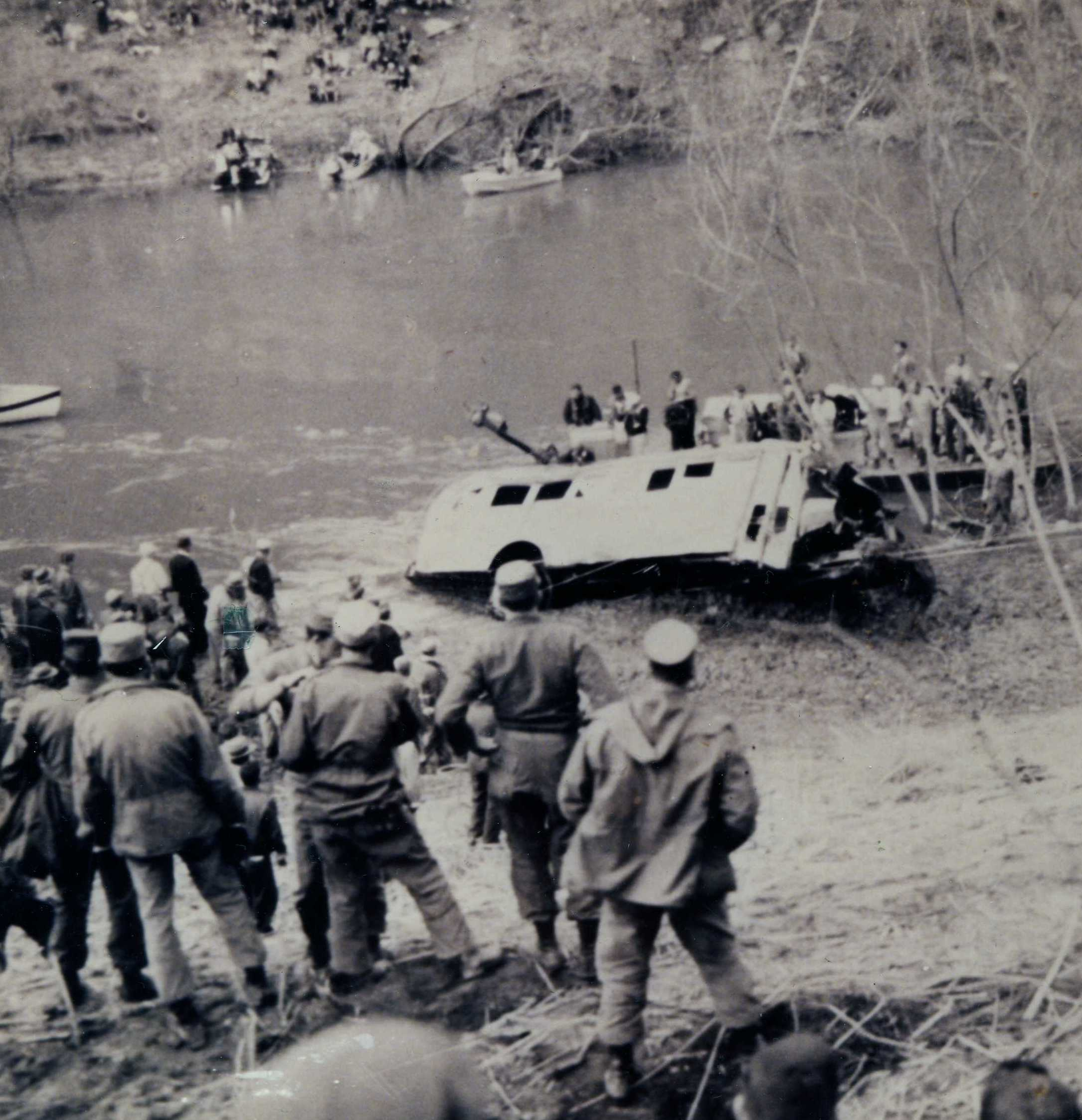
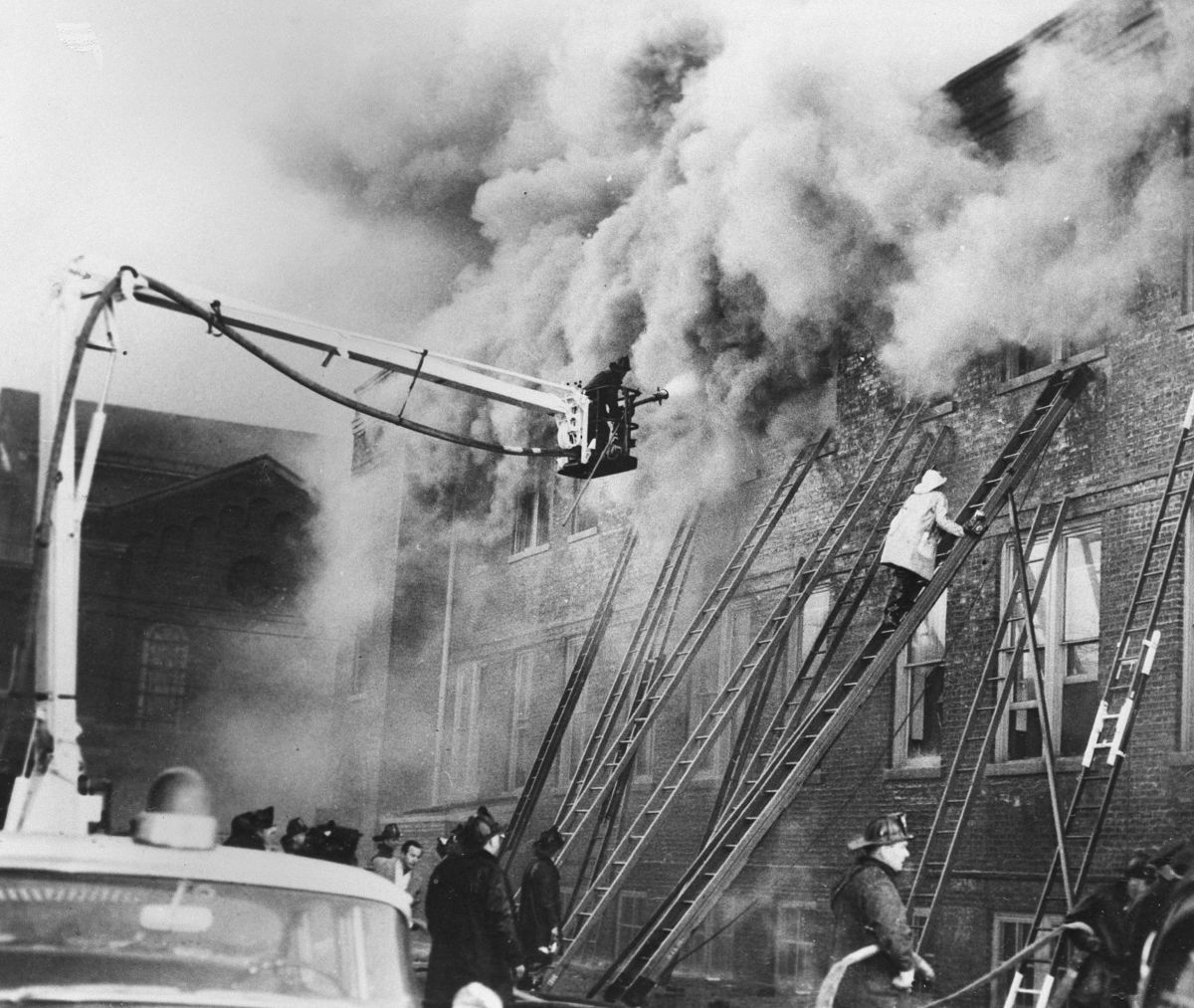
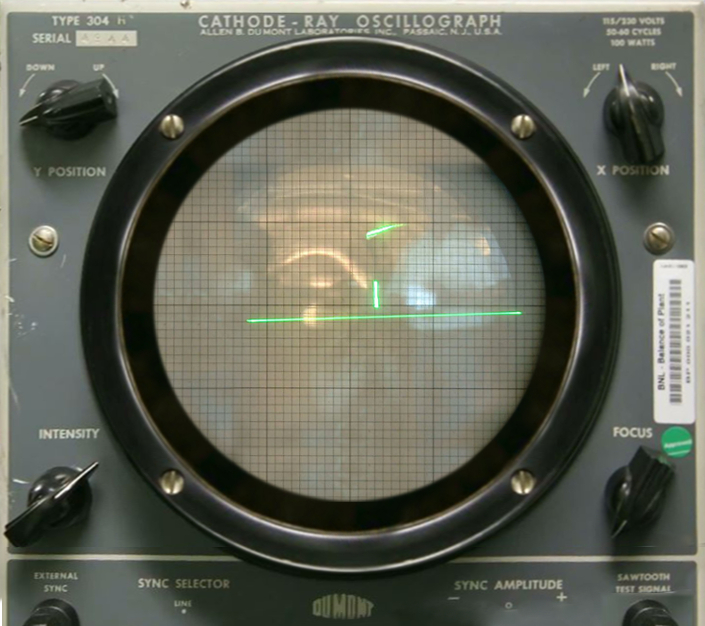
From top to bottom, left to right: the May 1958 crisis in France ends the Fourth Republic and returns Charles de Gaulle to power; the United Arab Republic briefly unites Egypt and Syria; China launches the Great Leap Forward; the 1958 FIFA World Cup sees Brazil win its first title with a breakout performance by Pelé; the 14 July Revolution topples Iraq's monarchy; the 1958 Lebanon crisis prompts U.S. intervention; the Prestonsburg, Kentucky, bus disaster kills 27 children; the Our Lady of the Angels School fire kills 95 in Chicago; and Tennis for Two, created by William Higinbotham, becomes an early video game.

1958 (MCMLVIII) was a common year starting on Wednesday of the Gregorian calendar, the 1958th year of the Common Era (CE) and Anno Domini (AD) designations, the 958th year of the 2nd millennium, the 58th year of the 20th century, and the 9th year of the 1950s decade.

== Events ==
The World record loop is showcased towards the end of the video.

=== January ===
- January 1 – The European Economic Community (EEC) comes into being.
- January 3 – The West Indies Federation is formed.
- January 4
  - Edmund Hillary's Commonwealth Trans-Antarctic Expedition completes the third overland journey to the South Pole, the first to use powered vehicles.
  - Sputnik 1 (launched on October 4, 1957) falls towards Earth from its orbit and burns up.
- January 13 – Battle of Edchera: The Moroccan Army of Liberation ambushes a Spanish patrol.
- January 27 – A Soviet-American executive agreement on cultural, educational and scientific exchanges, also known as the "Lacy–Zarubin Agreement", is signed in Washington, D.C.

=== February ===
- February 1 – Egypt and Syria unite to form the United Arab Republic.
- February 2 – The Falcons aerobatic team of the Pakistan Air Force led by Wg Cdr Mitty Masud set a world record performing a 16 aircraft diamond loop in F-86 Sabres. 30,000 people are in attendance including President Iskandar Ali Mirza, General Ayub Khan, Air Marshal Asghar Khan, Air Commodore Nur Khan, C-in-C Turkish Air Force Hamdullah Suphi Göker, Chief of the Iraqi Air Force Abdul Kadhim Abaddi, Chief of the Imperial Iranian Air Force and Chief Guest King Zahir Shah in whose honor the performance has been organized.
- February 5 – 1958 Tybee Island mid-air collision: A U.S. B-47 bomber jettisons a hydrogen bomb into Wassaw Sound off Tybee Island, Georgia; it is never recovered.
- February 6 – Seven Manchester United footballers are among the 21 people killed in the Munich air disaster in West Germany, on the return flight from a European Cup game in Yugoslavia. 23 people survive; manager Matt Busby and players Johnny Berry and Duncan Edwards are in a serious condition. Berry will never play again and Edwards dies a fortnight later, as does the co-pilot.
- February 11 – Marshal Chen Yi succeeds Zhou Enlai as Chinese Minister of Foreign Affairs.
- February 14 – The Hashemite Kingdoms of Iraq and Jordan unite in the Arab Federation, with King Faisal II of Iraq as head of state.
- February 23
  - Cuban rebels kidnap five-time world driving champion Juan Manuel Fangio, releasing him 28 hours later.
  - Arturo Frondizi is elected president of Argentina.
- February 24 – In Cuba, Fidel Castro's Radio Rebelde begins broadcasting from Sierra Maestra.
- February 25 – Bertrand Russell launches the Campaign for Nuclear Disarmament in the United Kingdom, initiated at a meeting called by Canon John Collins on January 15. The campaign peace symbol has been launched on 21 February by Gerald Holtom. Protests will focus on the Atomic Weapons Research Establishment at Aldermaston.
- February 28 – Prestonsburg bus disaster: One of the worst school bus accidents in U.S. history occurs in Kentucky when a school bus hits a truck and falls into a river, resulting in 27 deaths, 26 of them schoolchildren. Twenty-two others are rescued.

=== March ===
- March 1 – Turkish passenger ship Üsküdar capsizes and sinks in a sudden gale while crossing the Gulf of İzmit, Turkey; many of the 272 who die are teenage students.
- March 2 – A British Commonwealth Trans-Antarctic Expedition team, led by Sir Vivian Fuchs, completes the first overland crossing of the Antarctic, using snowcat caterpillar tractors and dogsled teams, in 99 days, via the South Pole.
- March 8 – The USS Wisconsin is decommissioned, leaving the United States Navy without an active battleship for the first time since 1896 (she is recommissioned October 22, 1988).
- March 11 – 1958 Mars Bluff B-47 nuclear weapon loss incident: A U.S. B-47 bomber accidentally drops an atom bomb on Mars Bluff, South Carolina. Without a fissile warhead, its conventional explosives destroy a house and injure six people.
- March 17 – The United States launches the Vanguard 1 satellite.
- March 19 – The Monarch Underwear Company fire occurs in New York, United States, killing 24 people.
- March 26 – The 30th Academy Awards Ceremony takes place in Hollywood; The Bridge on the River Kwai wins 7 awards, including Academy Award for Best Picture.
- March 27 – Nikita Khrushchev becomes Premier of the Soviet Union.

=== April ===
- April 1 – The Treaty of Angra de Cintra is signed by Spain and Morocco, ending the Spanish protectorate in Morocco.
- April 3 – In Cuba, Castro's revolutionary army begins its attacks on Havana.
- April 13 – The Soviet satellite Sputnik 2 (launched November 3, 1957) disintegrates during reentry from orbit.
- April 14 – Van Cliburn wins the International Tchaikovsky Competition for pianists in Moscow, easing Cold War tensions.
- April 17 – King Baudouin of Belgium officially opens the world's fair in Brussels, also known as Expo 58. The Atomium forms the centrepiece.
- April 20 – The Montreal Canadiens win the Stanley Cup in ice hockey, after defeating the Boston Bruins in 6 games.
- April 21 – United Airlines Flight 736 is involved in a mid-air collision with a U.S. Air Force F-100F jet fighter over what becomes Enterprise, Nevada; all 49 persons in both aircraft are killed.
- April 28 – A bomber flown by a U.S. Central Intelligence Agency operative in support of Indonesian Permesta rebels bombs the harbor at Balikpapan, Borneo, Indonesia, hitting an Indonesian naval corvette and two British oil tankers. In June, the Indonesian and British governments both claim that Indonesian rebels are responsible for such attacks, concealing the C.I.A.'s involvement.

=== May ===
- May 1
  - Arturo Frondizi becomes President of Argentina.
  - U.S. space scientist James van Allen announces the discovery of Earth's magnetosphere.
  - The Nordic Passport Union comes into force.
- May 10 – Interviewed in the Chave d'Ouro café, when asked about his rival António de Oliveira Salazar, Humberto Delgado utters one of the most famous comments in Portuguese political history: "Obviamente, demito-o! (Obviously, I'll sack him!)".
- May 12 – A formal North American Aerospace Defense Command agreement is signed between the United States and Canada.
- May 13
  - Crisis in France: French Algerian protesters seize government offices in Algiers, leading to a military coup.
  - During a visit to Caracas, Venezuela, Vice President Richard Nixon's car is attacked by anti-American demonstrators.
- May 15 – The Soviet Union launches Sputnik 3.
- May 18 – A U.S. Lockheed F-104 Starfighter sets a world speed record of 1,404.19 mph (2,259.82 km/h).
- May 20 – The Cuban government of Fulgencio Batista launches a counteroffensive against Castro's rebels.
- May 22 – U.S. President Dwight D. Eisenhower becomes the first American elected official to appear on color television.
- May 28 – Real Madrid beats A.C. Milan 3–2 at Heysel Stadium, Brussels, and wins the 1957–58 European Cup in Association football.
- May 30 – The bodies of unidentified United States soldiers killed in action during World War II and the Korean War are buried at the Tomb of the Unknowns, in Arlington National Cemetery.

=== June ===
- June 1
  - Charles de Gaulle is brought out of retirement at Colombey-les-Deux-Églises to lead France by decree for 6 months.
  - Iceland extends its fishing limits to 12 miles (22.2 km).
- June 4 – French Prime Minister Charles de Gaulle visits Algeria.
- June 16 – Imre Nagy and other leaders of the failed Hungarian Revolution of 1956 are hanged for treason, following secret trials.
- June 20 – The iron barque Omega of Callao, Peru (built in Liverpool, 1887), the world's last full-rigged ship trading under sail alone, sinks on passage carrying guano from the Pachacamac Islands for Huacho.
- June 29 – Brazil beats Sweden 5–2 in the final game to win the football World Cup in Sweden.
- June 30 – The 1957–58 Ifni War ends in Spanish Sahara.

=== July ===
- July 9 – 1958 Lituya Bay megatsunami: A 7.8 M_{w} strike-slip earthquake in Southeast Alaska causes a landslide that produces a megatsunami. The runup from the waves reaches 525 m (1,722 ft) on the rim of Lituya Bay.
- July 12 – Henri Cornelis becomes Governor-General of the Belgian Congo, the last Belgian governor prior to independence.
- July 14 – July 14 Revolution in Iraq: King Faisal II and several family members are executed. Abd al-Karim Qasim assumes power.
- July 15 – 1958 Lebanon crisis: 5,000 United States Marines land in the Lebanese capital Beirut in support of the pro-Western government.
- July 24 – Fourteen life peerages, the first under the Life Peerages Act 1958, are created in the United Kingdom.
- July 26
  - Explorer program: Explorer 4 is launched in the United States.
  - Queen Elizabeth II of the United Kingdom announces that she is giving her son Prince Charles the customary title for the heir apparent of Prince of Wales. The announcement is made at the end of the 1958 British Empire and Commonwealth Games, held in Cardiff.
- July 29 – The U.S. Congress formally creates the National Aeronautics and Space Administration (NASA).

=== August ===
- August 3 – The nuclear-powered submarine USS Nautilus becomes the first vessel to cross the North Pole under water.
- August 6
  - Australian athlete Herb Elliott clips almost 3 seconds off the world record for the mile run at Santry Stadium, Dublin, recording a time of 3 minutes 54.5 seconds.
  - The Law of Permanent Defense of Democracy, which outlawed the Communist Party of Chile and banned 26,650 persons from the electoral lists, is repealed.
- August 7 – 1958 East Pakistan-India border skirmishes, a skirmish between East Pakistan and the Indian Army in Laxmipur.
- August 14 – KLM Flight 607-E, a Lockheed L-1049 Super Constellation, crashes into the Atlantic with 99 people aboard, all of whom are killed.
- August 17 – The first Thor-Able rocket is launched, carrying Pioneer 0, from Cape Canaveral Air Force Station Space Launch Complex 17. The launch fails due to a first stage malfunction.
- August 18 – Brojen Das from East Pakistan swims across the English Channel in a competition, the first Bangali as well as the first Asian to ever do it. He is first among 39 competitors.
- August 21–October 15 – Illinois observes the centennial of the Lincoln–Douglas debates.
- August 23 – The Second Taiwan Strait Crisis begins with the People's Republic of China's People's Liberation Army shelling the island of Kinmen (Quemoy) which is controlled by the Republic of China (Taiwan)'s Kuomintang forces.
- August 26 – A general strike is called in Paraguay.
- August 30–September 1 – Notting Hill race riots: Riots occur between blacks and whites in Notting Hill, London.

=== September ===
- September 1 – The first Cod War begins between the United Kingdom and Iceland.
- September 2
  - Hendrik Verwoerd becomes the 6th Prime Minister of South Africa.
  - China's first television broadcasts start at Beijing Television Station, a predecessor of China Central Television.
- September 4 – Jorge Alessandri is the winner of Chile's presidential election.
- September 12 – Jack Kilby invents the first integrated circuit, while working at Texas Instruments.
- September 14 – Two rockets designed by German engineer Ernst Mohr (the first German post-war rockets) reach the upper atmosphere.
- September 18 – BankAmericard, the first credit card to be widely offered, is launched in Fresno, California in what becomes known as the "Fresno Drop".
- September 27
  - Typhoon Ida kills at least 1,269 people in Honshū, Japan.
  - Hurricane Helene, the worst storm of the North Atlantic hurricane season, reaches category 4 status.
- September 28
  - In the 1958 French constitutional referendum, a majority of 79% says yes to the constitution of the Fifth Republic.
  - Fernando Rios, a Mexican tour guide in New Orleans, dies from injuries suffered in an incident of gay bashing.
- September 30 – The U.S.S.R. performs a nuclear test at Novaya Zemlya.

=== October ===
- October – GoldStar, predecessor of LG Electronics, is founded in South Korea.
- October 1
  - Tunisia and Morocco join the Arab League.
  - The United Kingdom transfers sovereignty of Christmas Island from Singapore to Australia.
  - NASA starts operations and replaces the NACA in the United States.
- October 2 – Guinea declares itself independent from France, rejecting that nation's new constitution.
- October 4
  - The new Constitution of France is signed into law, establishing the French Fifth Republic.
  - The British Overseas Airways Corporation (BOAC) uses one of its new de Havilland Comet 4s, G-APDB, to make the first commercial transatlantic flight by a jet airliner, from London to New York International Airport, Anderson Field via Gander.
- October 11 – Pioneer 1, the second and most successful of the 3 project Able space probes, becomes the first spacecraft launched by the newly formed NASA.
- October 17 – An Evening with Fred Astaire, the first television show recorded on color videotape, is broadcast on NBC in the United States.
- October 18 – Tennis for Two, a game invented by William Higinbotham and considered to be the first pure entertainment computer game, is introduced at the Brookhaven National Laboratory Visitors' Day Exhibit in the United States.
- October 26 – A Pan American World Airways Boeing 707 makes its first transatlantic flight.
- October 28 – Pope John XXIII succeeds Pope Pius XII, as the 261st pope.

=== November ===
- November 3
  - The new UNESCO building, World Heritage Centre, is inaugurated in Paris.
  - Jorge Alessandri is sworn in as President of Chile.
- November 10 – Harry Winston donates the Hope Diamond to the Smithsonian Institution in Washington, D.C.
- November 18 – En route to Rogers City, Michigan, United States, the Lake freighter SS Carl D. Bradley breaks up and sinks in a storm on Lake Michigan; 33 of the 35 crewmen on board perish.
- November 20 – The Jim Henson Company is founded as Muppets, Inc. in the United States.
- November 22 – 1958 Australian federal election: Robert Menzies' Liberal/Country Coalition Government is re-elected with a slightly increased majority, defeating the Labor Party led by H.V. Evatt. This is the first election where television is used as a medium for communicating with voters. Evatt will eventually resign as Labor leader and will be replaced by his deputy Arthur Calwell.
- November 25 – French Sudan gains autonomy as a self-governing member of the French colonial empire.
- November 28 – Chad, the Republic of the Congo and Gabon become autonomous republics within the French colonial empire.
- November 30 – Gaullists win the French parliamentary election.

=== December ===
- December 1
  - Our Lady of the Angels School fire: 90 students and 3 nuns are killed in a fire in Chicago.
  - Adolfo López Mateos takes office as President of Mexico.
- December 14 – The 3rd Soviet Antarctic Expedition becomes the first ever to reach the Southern Pole of Inaccessibility.
- December 15 – Arthur L. Schawlow and Charles H. Townes of Bell Laboratories publish a paper in Physical Review Letters setting out the principles of the optical laser.
- December 16
  - A fire breaks out in the Vida Department Store in Bogotá, Colombia and kills 84 persons.
  - Soviet polar pilot V. M. Perov on Li-2 rescues four Belgian polar explorers, led by Gaston de Gerlache, who have survived a plane crash in Antarctica 250 km from their base five days earlier.
- December 18
  - The United States launches SCORE, the world's first communications satellite.
  - The Bell XV-3 Tiltrotor makes the first true mid-air transition from vertical helicopter-type flight to fully level fixed-wing flight.
- December 19 – A message from U.S. President Dwight D. Eisenhower is broadcast from the SCORE satellite.
- December 21 – General Charles de Gaulle is elected president of France with 78.5% of the votes.
- December 24 – 1958 BOAC Bristol Britannia crash: A BOAC Bristol Britannia (312 G-AOVD) crashes near Winkton, England, during a test flight, killing nine people. Three crew members survive.
- December 29 – Battle of Santa Clara: Rebel troops under Camilo Cienfuegos and Che Guevara begin to invade Santa Clara, Cuba.
- December 30 – The Guatemalan Air Force fires on Mexican fishing boats which had strayed into Guatemalan territory, triggering the Mexico–Guatemala conflict.
- December 31 – After the fall of Santa Clara, Cuban President Fulgencio Batista flees the country.

=== Undated ===
- For the first time, the total of transatlantic passengers carried by air this year exceeds the total carried by sea.
- Denatonium, the bitterest substance known, is discovered. It is used as an aversive agent in products such as bleach to reduce the risk of children drinking them.

== Births ==
=== January ===
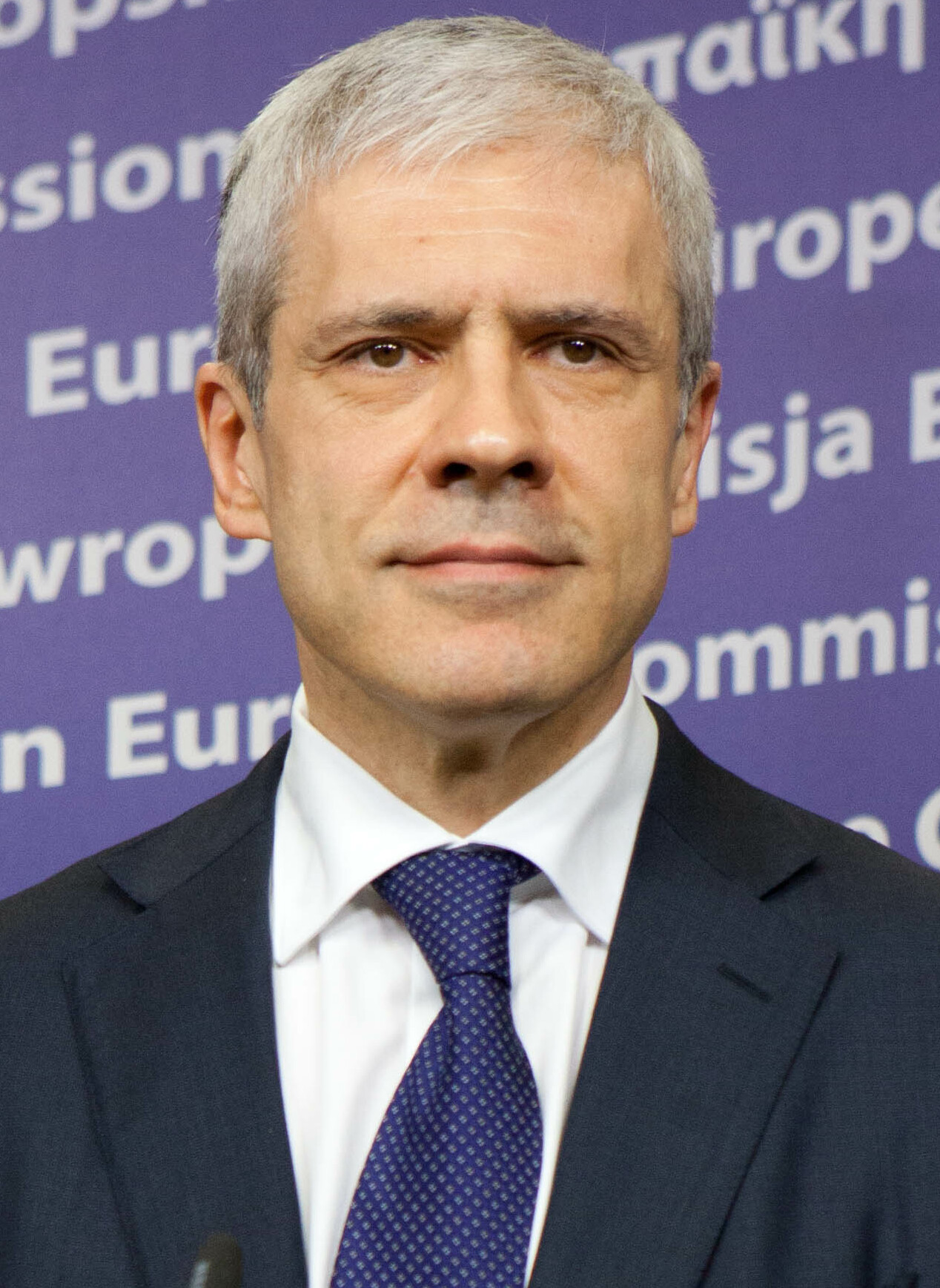
Boris Tadić

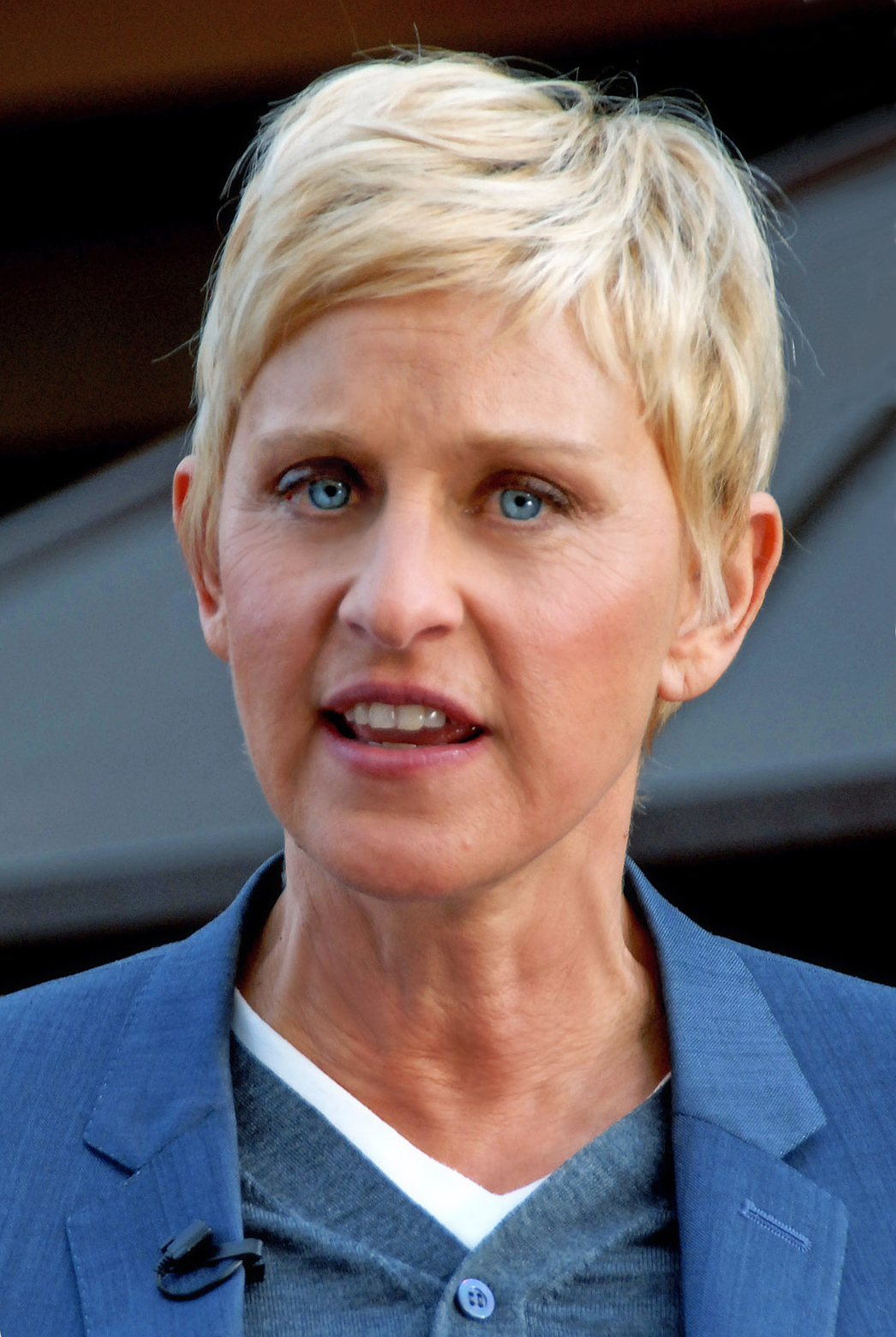
Ellen DeGeneres

- January 1
  - Grandmaster Flash, Barbadian-American hip-hop/rap DJ
  - Renn Woods, American actress, vocalist and songwriter
- January 4 – Matt Frewer, Canadian-American actor (Max Headroom)
- January 6 – Shlomo Glickstein, Israeli tennis player
- January 7 – Yasmin Ahmad, Malaysian film director, writer and scriptwriter (d. 2009)
- January 8 – Betsy DeVos, American businesswoman and politician, 11th Secretary of Education
- January 9 – Mehmet Ali Ağca, Turkish militant, would-be assassin of Pope John Paul II
- January 10
  - Samira Said, Moroccan singer
  - Eddie Cheever, American racing driver and motorsport executive
  - Jerry Estrada, Mexican luchador
  - Pantaleon Alvarez, Filipino lawyer and politician
  - Dov Khenin, Israeli politician, political scientist and lawyer
- January 12 – Christiane Amanpour, British-born Iranian journalist and television host for CNN and PBS
- January 14 – Greg Fischer, American businessman, entrepreneur, and politician
- January 15 – Boris Tadić, Serbian president
- January 17 – Ted Conover, American author and journalist
- January 19
  - Thomas Kinkade, American painter (d. 2012)
  - Stephen Fried, American investigative journalist, author, and lecturer
- January 20 – Lorenzo Lamas, American actor, martial artist and reality show participant
- January 21 – Hussein Saeed, Iraqi football player
- January 24
  - Jools Holland, British musician
  - Mike Harmon, American stock car racing driver, crew chief, and team owner
- January 26
  - Anita Baker, American soul and R&B singer
  - Ellen DeGeneres, American actress, comedian and television host
  - Xavier Becerra, American attorney and politician, Governor-elect of California
- January 28 – Mohammad-Ali Abtahi, Iranian theologian, scholar, and activist
- January 31 – Fit Finlay, Northern Irish former professional wrestler

=== February ===
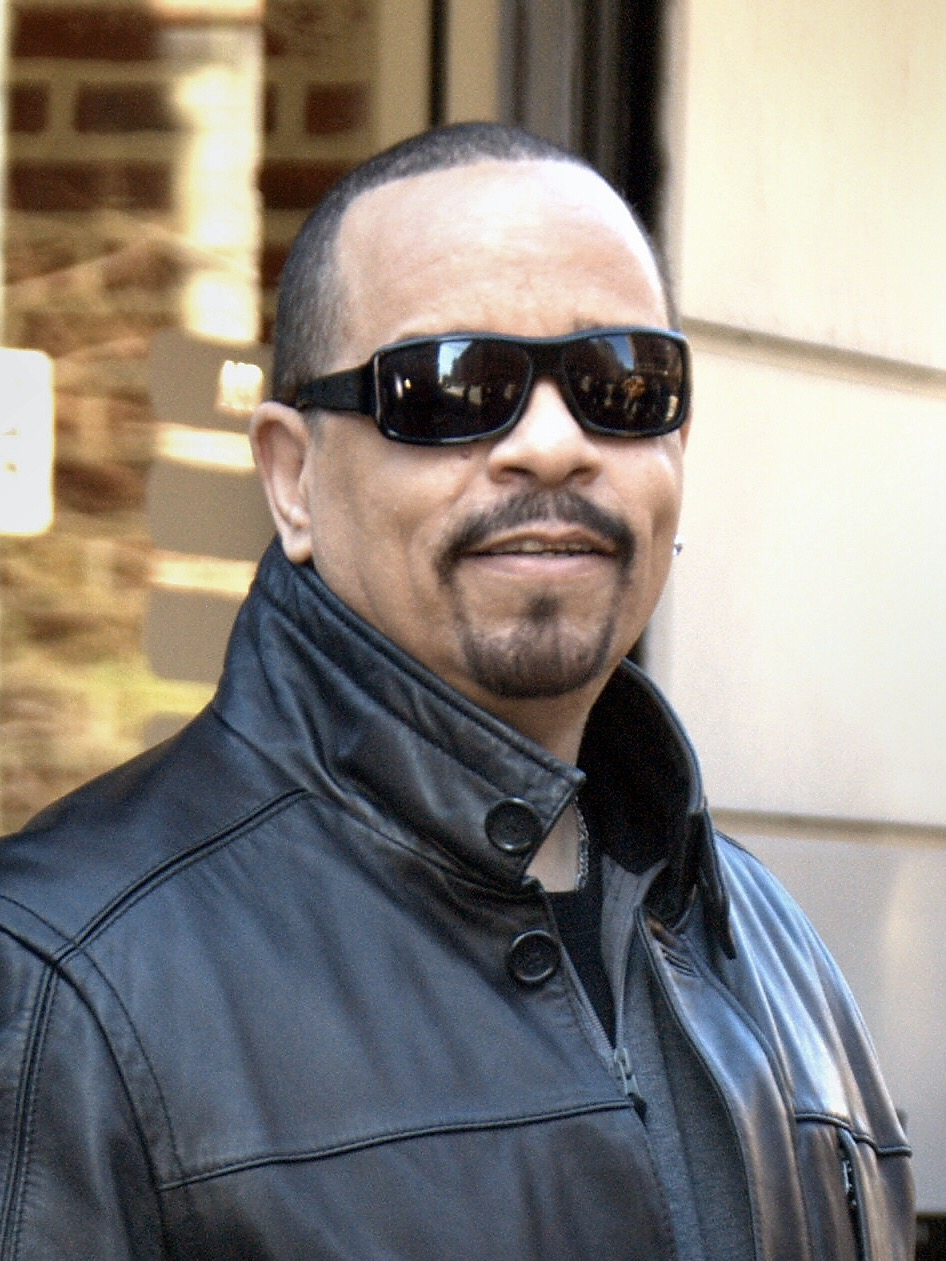
Ice-T

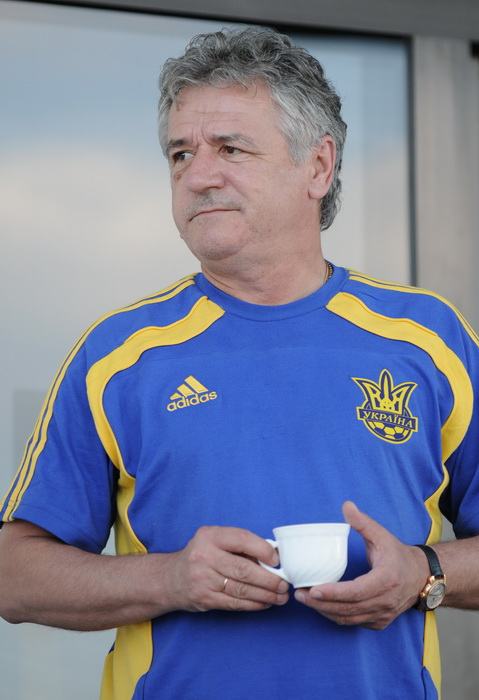
Andriy Bal

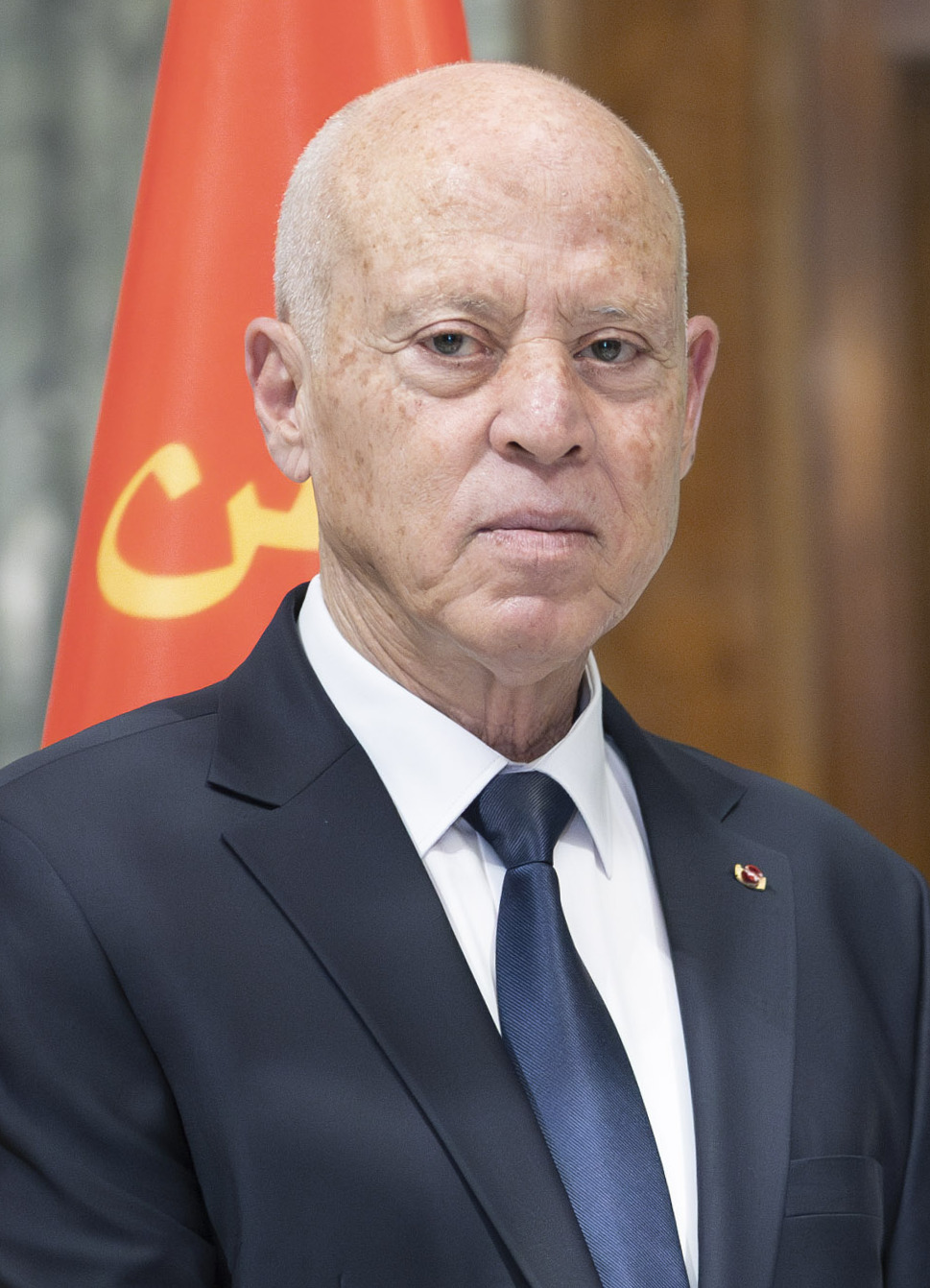
Kais Saied

- February 8
  - Marina Silva, Brazilian politician
  - Sherri Martel, American professional wrestler and manager (d. 2007)
- February 9 – Cyrille Regis, English footballer (d. 2018)
- February 10
  - Michael Weiss, Jazz pianist and composer
  - Ricardo Gareca, Argentine footballer and manager
- February 13
  - Pernilla August, Swedish actress
  - Marc Emery, Canadian cannabis rights activist, entrepreneur and politician
- February 15 – Shaun Toub, Iranian born-American actor
- February 16
  - Ice-T, American rapper, songwriter and actor
  - Andriy Bal, Ukrainian football player and coach (d. 2014)
- February 19 – Leslie David Baker, American actor
- February 21
  - Jack Coleman, American actor and screenwriter
  - Mary Chapin Carpenter, American singer
  - Kim Coates, Canadian-American actor
- February 22 – Kais Saied, President of Tunisia
- February 23 – David Sylvian, English musician, singer and songwriter
- February 25 – Jeff Fisher, American football coach and former player
- February 26
  - Susan Helms, American astronaut
  - Tim Kaine, American Senator
- February 27 – Maggie Hassan, US Senator
- February 28 – Natalya Estemirova, Russian activist (d. 2009)

=== March ===
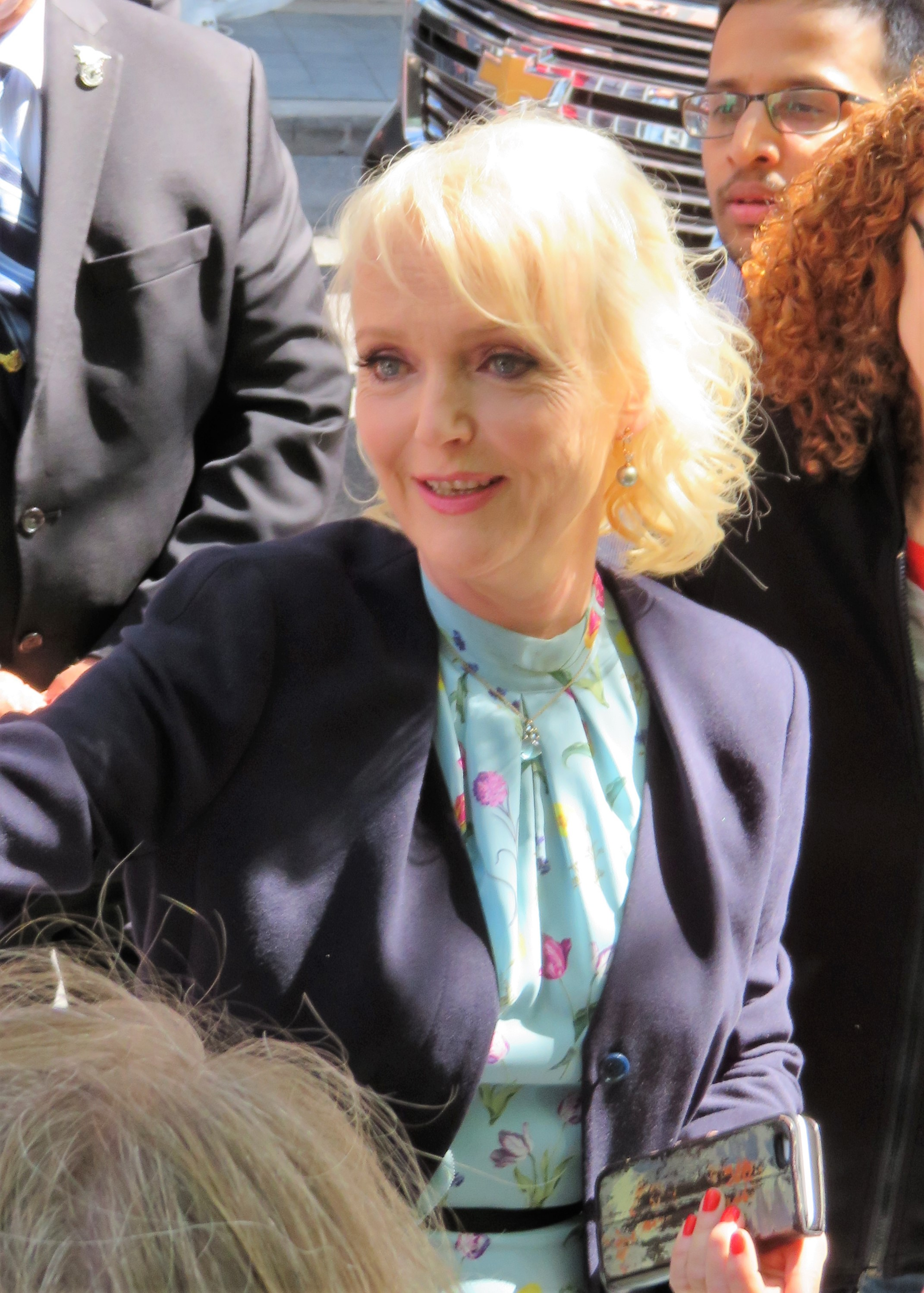
Miranda Richardson

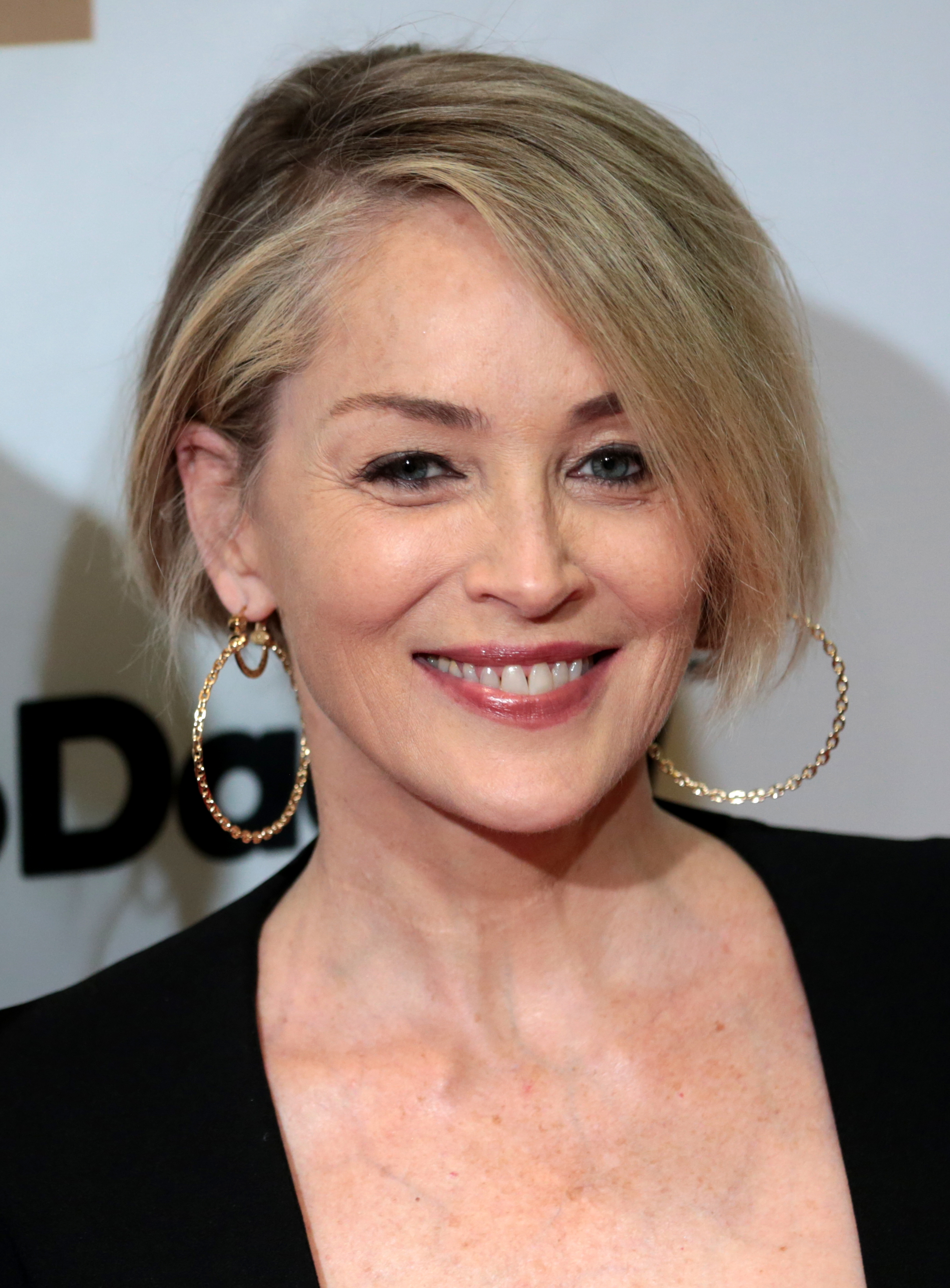
Sharon Stone

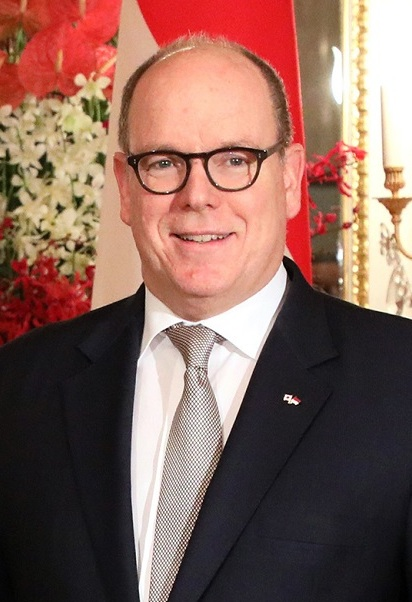
Albert II, Prince of Monaco

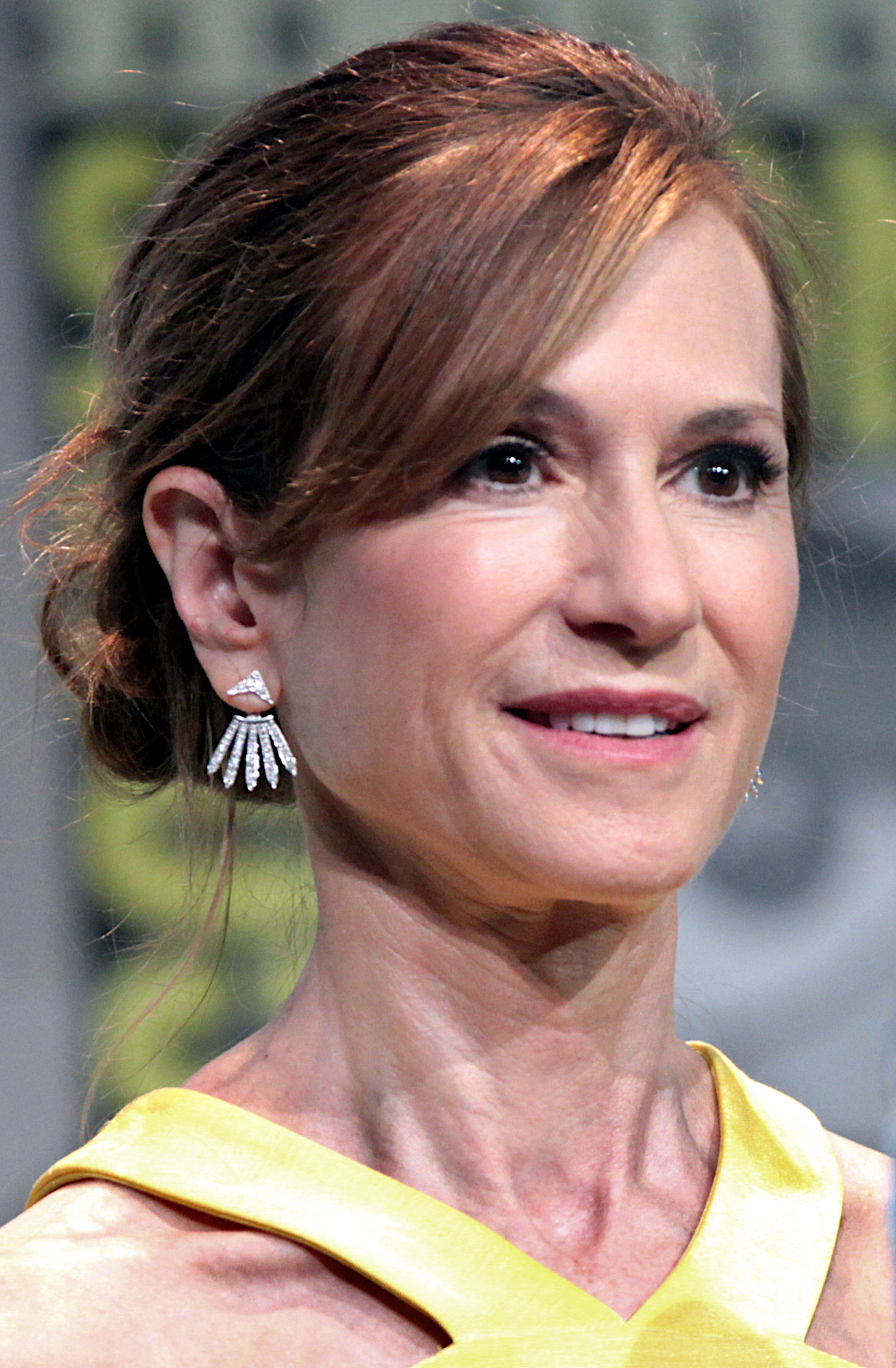
Holly Hunter

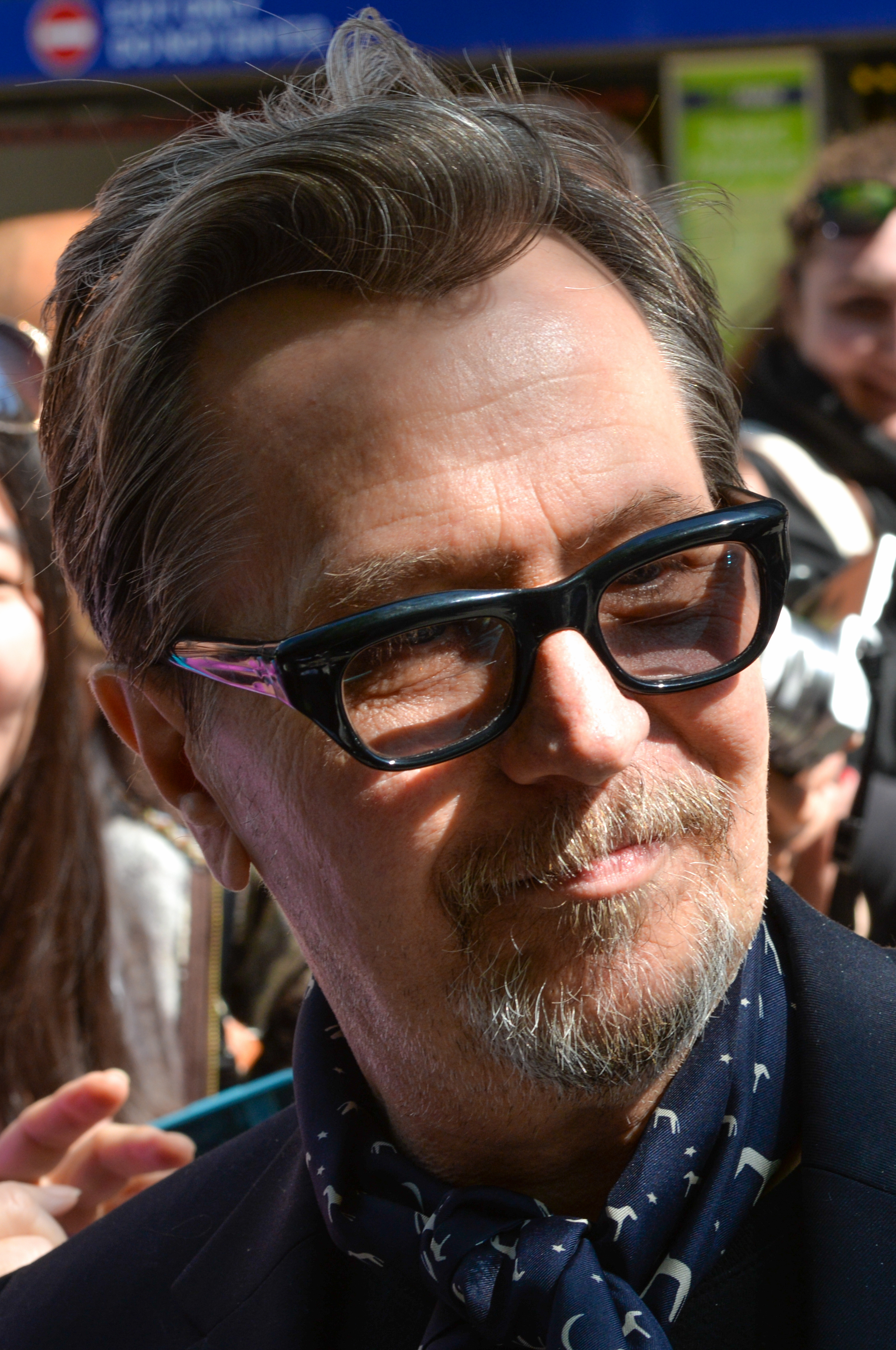
Gary Oldman

- March 1 – Sheikh Mohammad Aslam, Bangladeshi footballer
- March 3
  - Miranda Richardson, English actress
  - Gianni Alemanno, Italian politician and former mayor of Rome
- March 4
  - Patricia Heaton, American actress
  - Tina Smith, American Senator
- March 5 – Andy Gibb, English singer-songwriter, performer and teen idol (d. 1988)
- March 7
  - Rik Mayall, English comedian and actor (d. 2014)
  - Gregory Markkanen, American politician and member of the Michigan House of Representatives since 2019
  - Hélio dos Anjos, Brazilian football coach and player
- March 8 – Gary Numan, British singer
- March 9 – Mikhail Gutseriev, Russian billionaire businessperson
- March 10
  - Sheikh Mohammad Illias, Bengali politician
  - Sharon Stone, American actress and producer
  - Frankie Ruiz, Puerto Rican singer (d. 1998)
- March 11 – Matthew Aid, American military historian and author (d. 2018)
- March 14 – Albert II, Prince of Monaco
- March 15 – Ravi Belagere, Indian writer and journalist (d. 2020)
- March 16 – Phillip Wilcher, Australian pianist and composer
- March 18 – Mbaye Diagne, Senegalese military officer (d. 1994)
- March 19 – Andy Reid, American professional football coach
- March 20 – Holly Hunter, American actress
- March 21
  - Gary Oldman, English actor and filmmaker
  - Raul Khajimba, President of Abkhazia 2014 to 2020
- March 24 – Roland Koch, German politician
- March 25 – John Ensign, American veterinarian and politician
- March 26
  - Hala Fouad, Egyptian actress (d. 1993)
  - Alar Karis, President of Estonia
- March 28
  - Bart Conner, American gymnast
  - Curt Hennig, American professional wrestler (d. 2003)
- March 30
  - Maurice LaMarche, Canadian voice actor and comedian
  - Peter Ellis, wrongfully convicted New Zealand childcare worker (d. 2019)
  - Mike Rotunda, American professional wrestler
- March 31 – Dietmar Bartsch, German politician

=== April ===
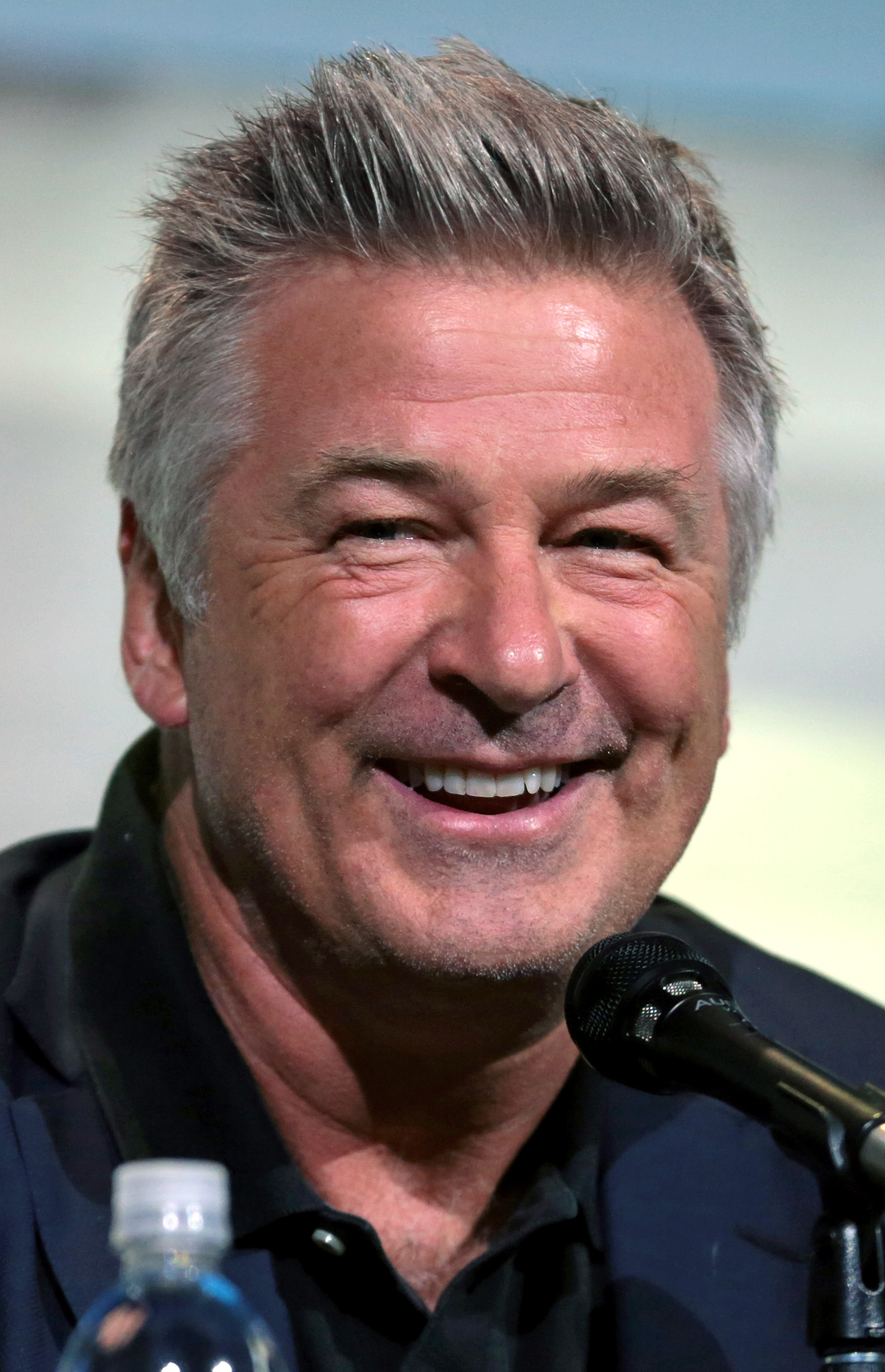
Alec Baldwin

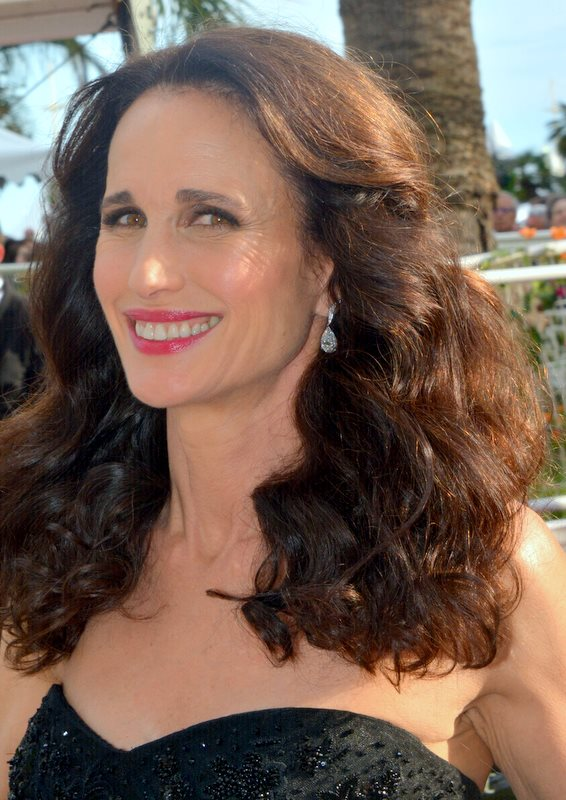
Andie MacDowell

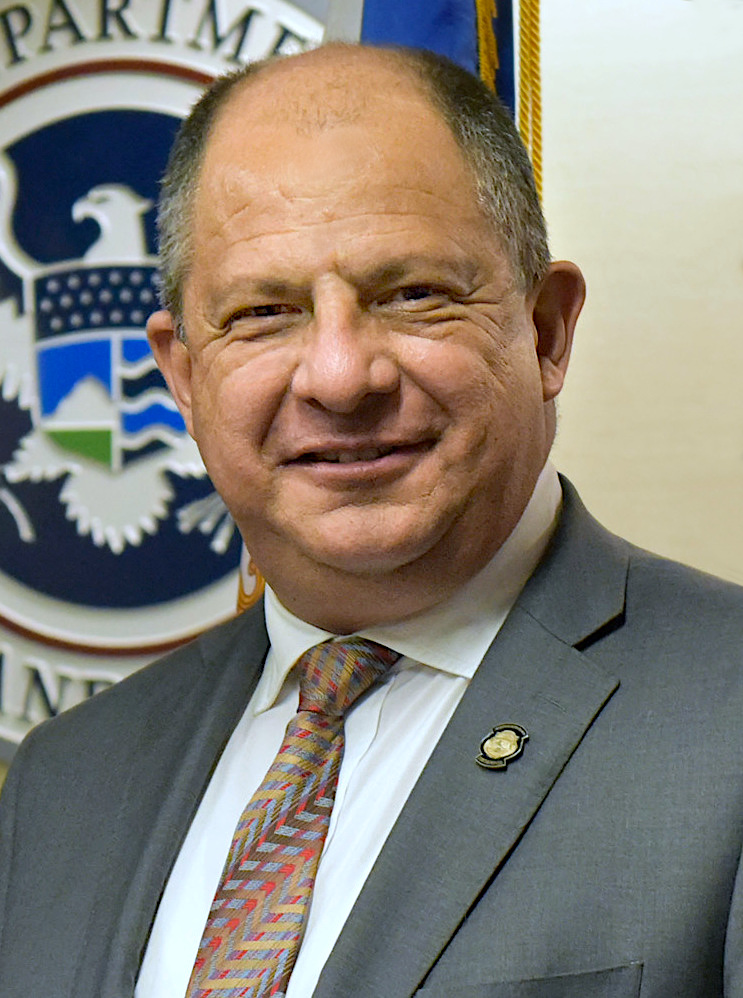
Luis Guillermo Solís

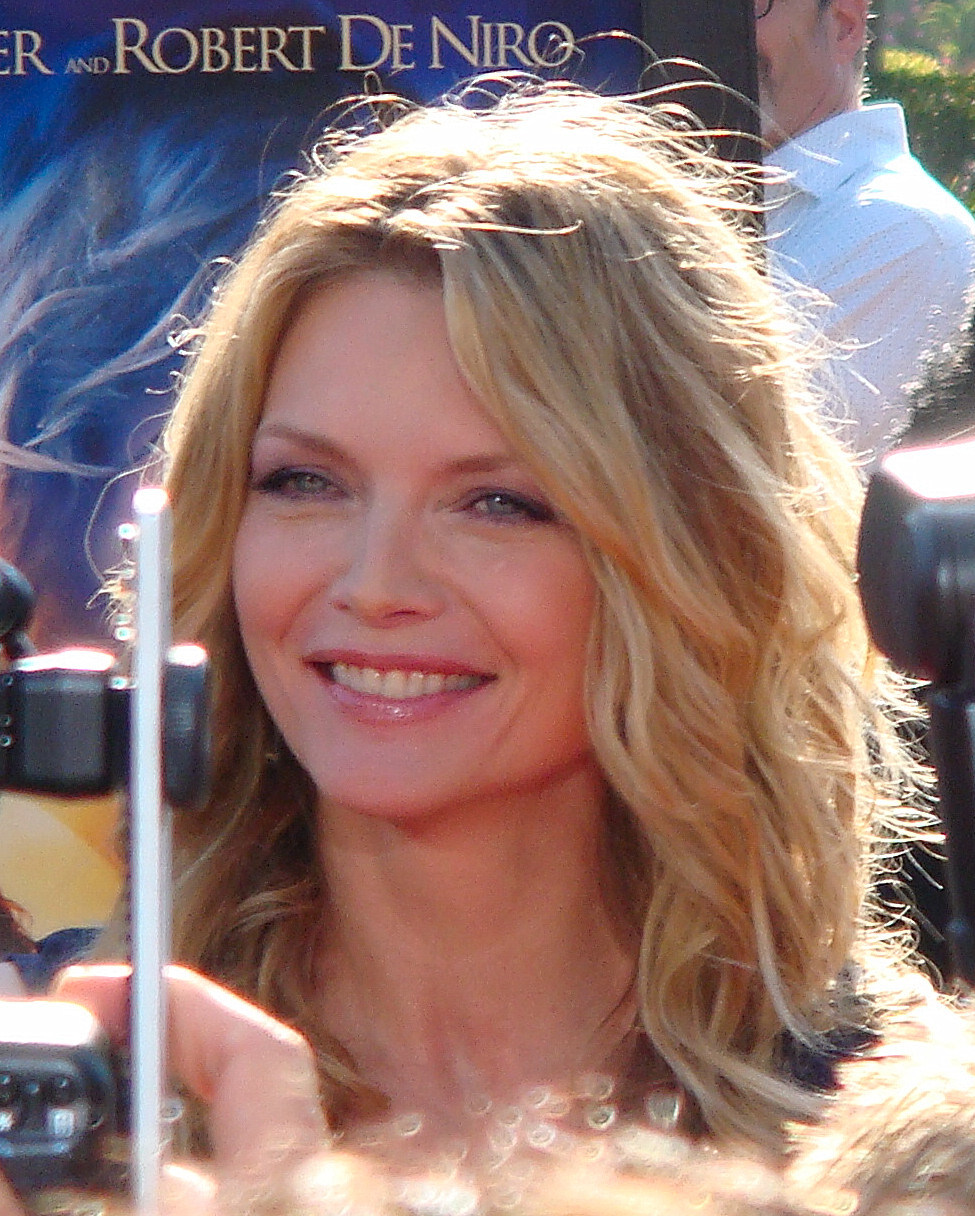
Michelle Pfeiffer

- April 2 – Jeff Wassmann, American artist, writer and theorist
- April 3
  - Alec Baldwin, American actor
  - Francesca Woodman, American photographer (d. 1981)
- April 4
  - Cazuza, Brazilian poet, singer and composer (d. 1990)
  - Vichai Srivaddhanaprabha, Thai billionaire businessman (d. 2018)
- April 6
  - Pascal Lecamp, French politician
  - Mark Henn, American animator and film director
- April 11
  - Stuart Adamson, Scottish guitarist and singer (d. 2001)
  - Luísa Diogo, prime minister of Mozambique (d. 2026)
- April 12
  - Ginka Zagorcheva, Bulgarian athlete
  - J. Alexander, American reality television personality and runway coach
- April 14 – Peter Capaldi, Scottish actor
- April 15 – Benjamin Zephaniah, British writer and musician (d. 2023)
- April 18 – Maurice Gamelin, French general (b. 1872)
- April 19 – Denis O'Brien, Irish billionaire businessman
- April 21
  - Andie MacDowell, American actress
  - Yoshito Usui, Japanese manga artist (Crayon Shin-chan) (d. 2009)
  - Lokua Kanza, Congolese singer and musician
- April 22 – Andy, Armenian-Iranian singer-songwriter and actor
- April 24 – Susan Tsvangirai, Spouse of the Prime Minister of Zimbabwe (d. 2009)
- April 25 –
  - Luis Guillermo Solís, President of Costa Rica
  - Mike DeVault, American politician
  - Rosemarie Aquilina, American judge
  - Fish, Scottish singer, songwriter and occasional actor
- April 26 – Giancarlo Esposito, Italian-American actor
- April 29 – Michelle Pfeiffer, American actress

=== May ===
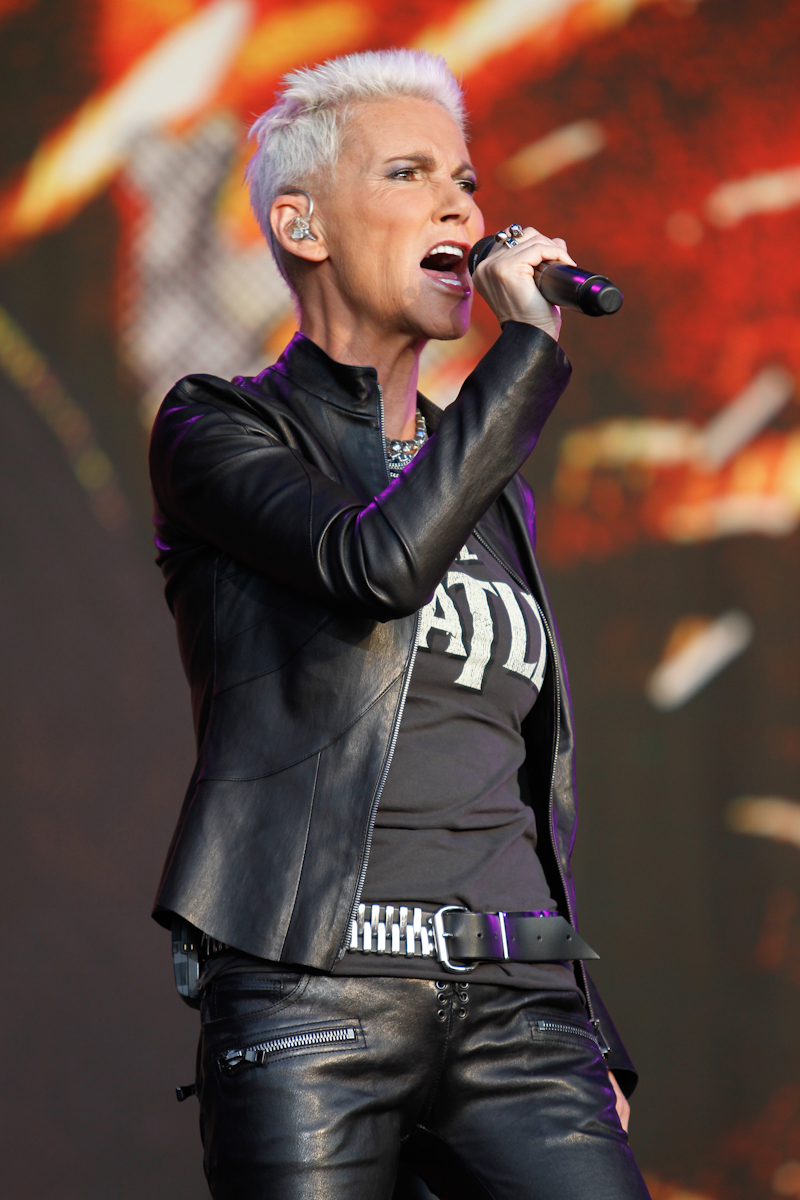
Marie Fredriksson

- May 2 – David O'Leary, Irish football manager
- May 3 – Sandi Toksvig, Danish-British writer, comedian and broadcaster
- May 4 – Keith Haring, American artist (d. 1990)
- May 8 – Lovie Smith, American football coach
- May 10
  - Rick Santorum, American politician
  - Ellen Ochoa, American astronaut, first Hispanic woman to go into space
  - Vlada Divljan, Serbian singer and songwriter (d. 2015)
- May 11 – Sayuri Kume, Japanese singer-songwriter
- May 12
  - Dries van Noten, Belgian designer
  - Eric Singer, American drummer (Kiss)
- May 13 – Frances Barber, English actress
- May 14 – Sarah Chen, Taiwanese singer
- May 15 – Ron Simmons, American professional wrestler and football player
- May 17
  - Paul Di'Anno, English heavy metal singer (d. 2024)
  - Paul Whitehouse, Welsh actor, writer, presenter and comedian
- May 18 – Toyah Willcox, English singer-songwriter, actress, and television presenter
- May 19 – Jenny Durkan, American attorney, federal prosecutor and politician
- May 20 – Jane Wiedlin, American musician and actress
- May 23
  - Drew Carey, American comedian and actor
  - Lea DeLaria, American comedian, actress and jazz singer
  - Mitch Albom, American author and journalist
- May 25 – Paul Weller, English singer-songwriter
- May 26 – Margaret Colin, American actress
- May 27 – Neil Finn, New Zealand singer-songwriter
- May 29
  - Annette Bening, American actress
  - Juliano Mer-Khamis, Israeli actor, director, filmmaker and political activist (d. 2011)
- May 30
  - Marie Fredriksson, Swedish rock guitarist and singer-songwriter (d. 2019)
  - K. S. Ravikumar, Indian film director, film producer, screenwriter and actor

=== June ===
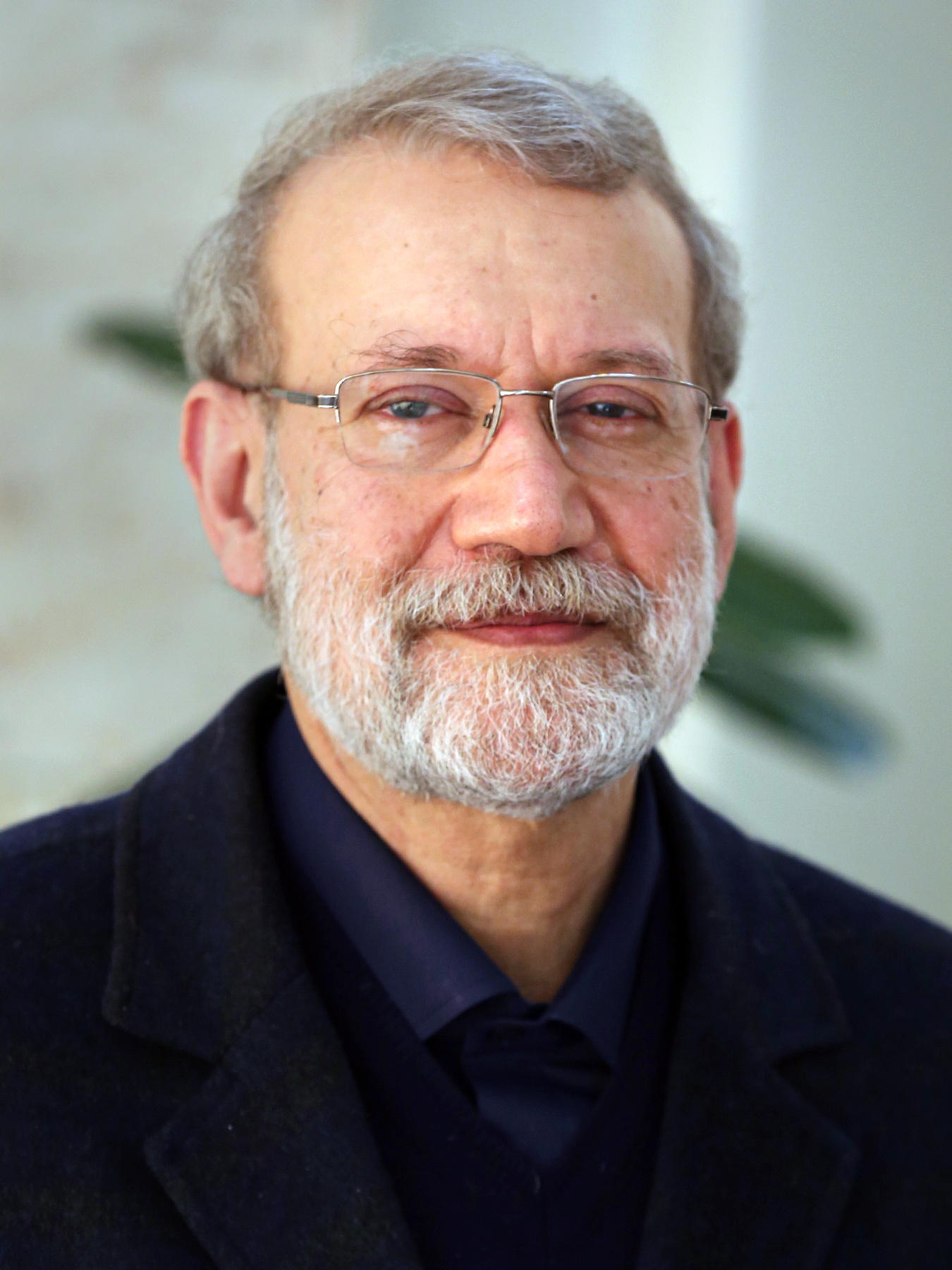
Ali Larijani

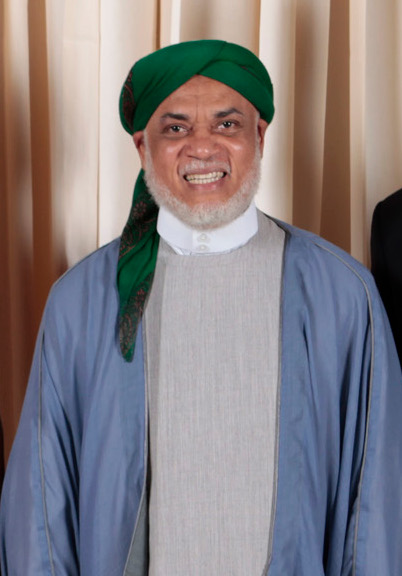
Ahmed Abdallah Mohamed Sambi

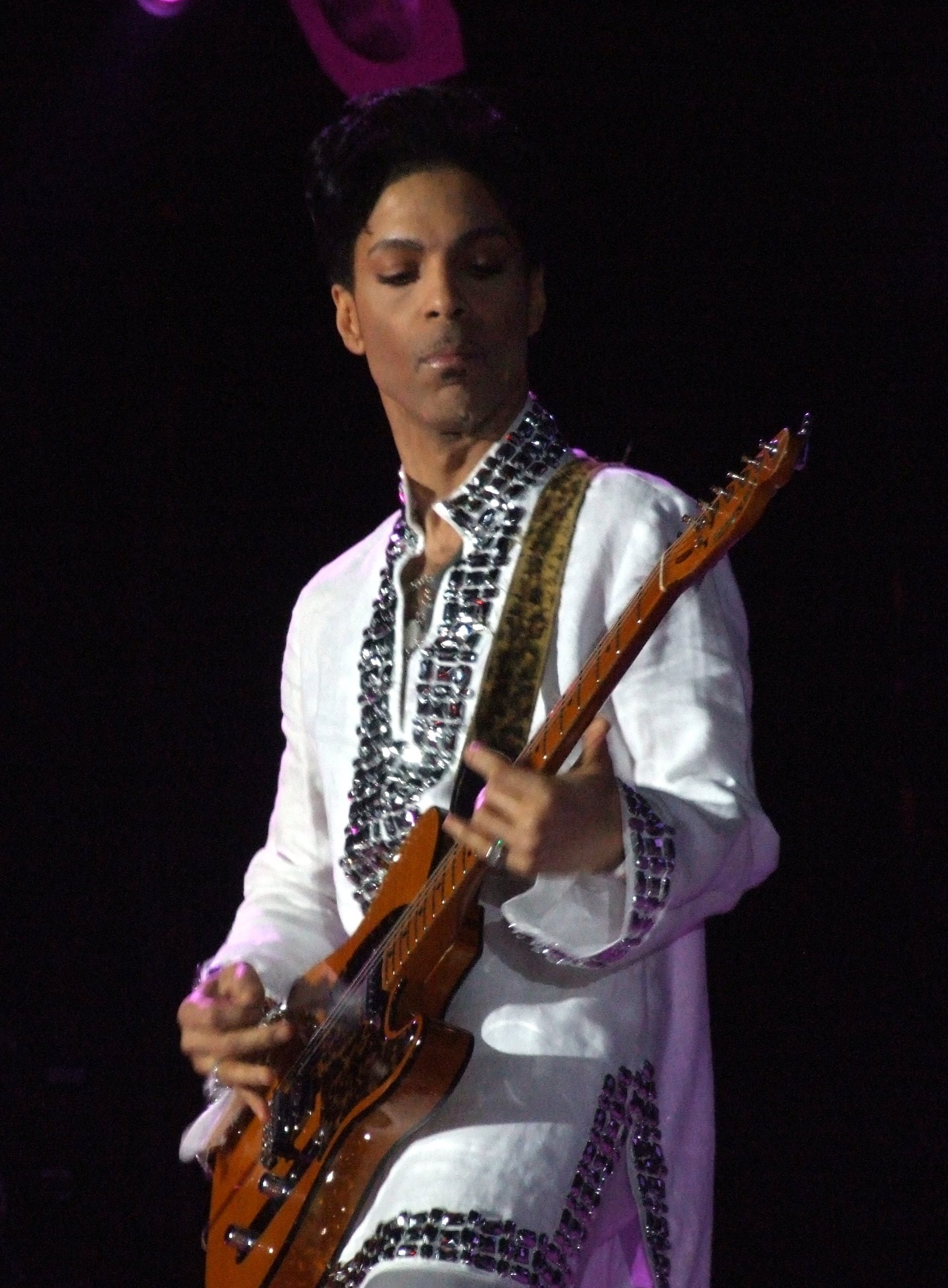
Prince

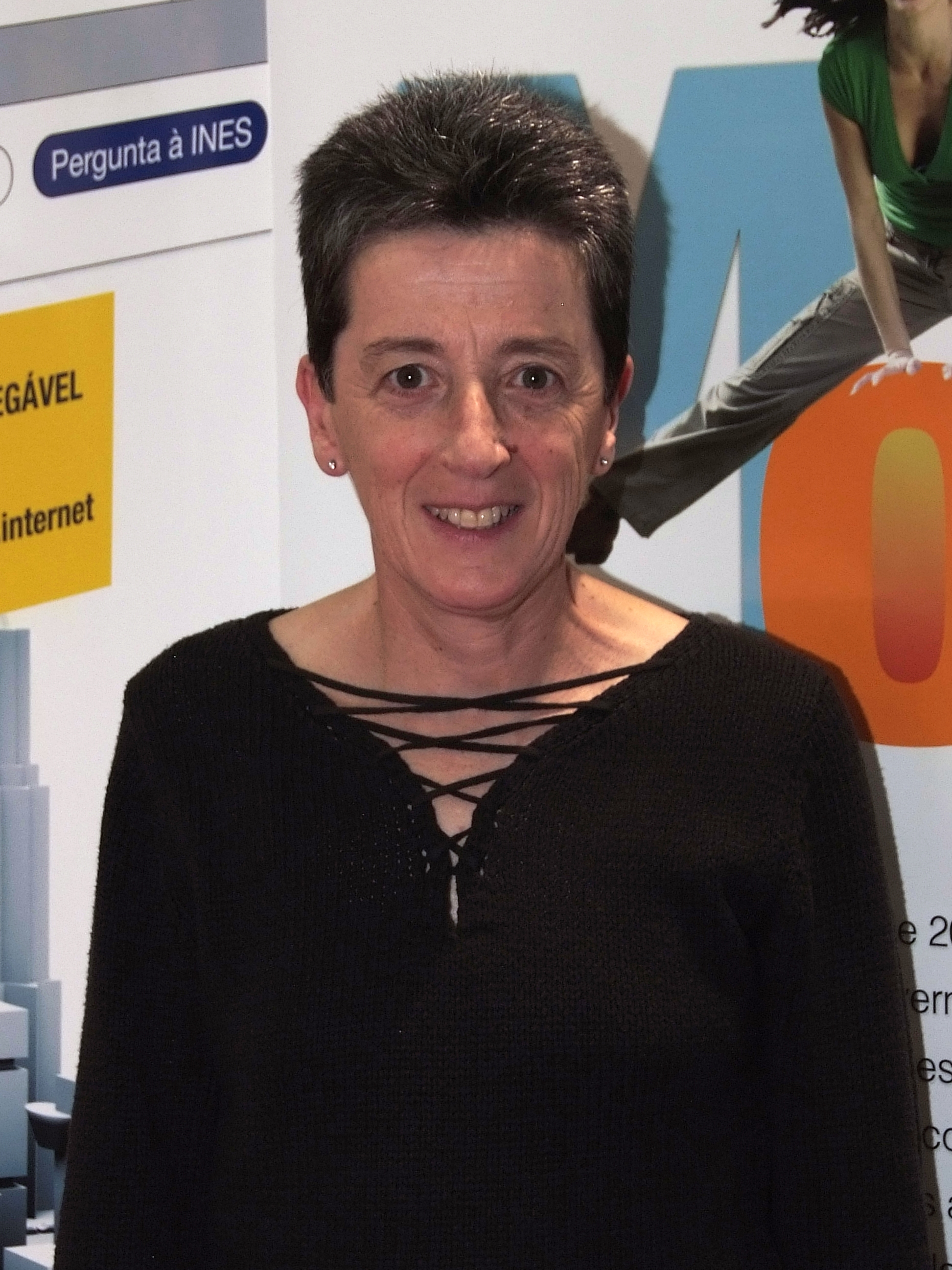
Rosa Mota

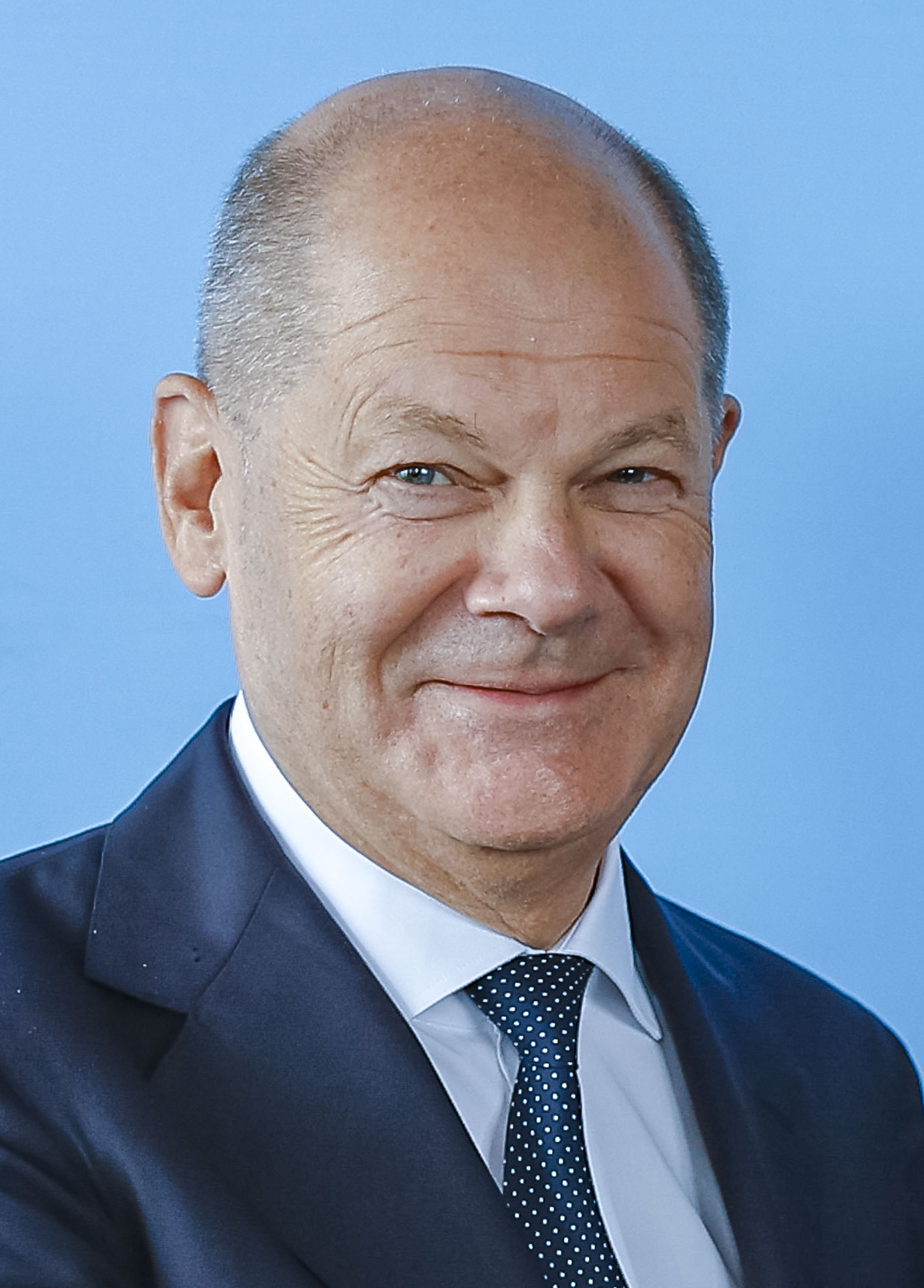
Olaf Scholz

- June 1 – Nambaryn Enkhbayar, Mongolian lawyer and politician, 3rd President of Mongolia
- June 2 – Lex Luger, American professional wrestler
- June 3
  - Margot Käßmann, Lutheran theologian, German bishop
  - Ali Larijani, Iranian politician, military officer, Secretary of the Supreme National Security Council (2005-2007; 2025-2026)
- June 5 – Ahmed Abdallah Mohamed Sambi, Comoroan businessman and politician, President of Comoros 2006–2011
- June 6 – Wayne Babych, Canadian professional ice hockey player
- June 7 – Prince, African-American musician (d. 2016)
- June 8
  - Dan Severn, American wrestler and mixed martial artist
  - Louise Richardson, Irish political scientist
- June 10 – Elain Harwood, English architectural historian (d. 2023)
- June 12 – Mark Amodei, American lawyer and politician
- June 14
  - Eric Heiden, American speed skater with five Olympic gold medals
  - Olaf Scholz, 9th Chancellor of Germany
- June 15 – Wade Boggs, American baseball player
- June 16
  - Ted Arcidi, American professional wrestler, actor and powerlifter
  - Gordana Čomić, Serbian politician
- June 17
  - Jello Biafra, American singer and activist
  - Jerry Carl, American politician and businessman
- June 18 – Peter Altmaier, German jurist and politician, Federal Minister for Special Affairs of Germany
- June 19 – Sergei Makarov, Russian ice-hockey player and coach
- June 21 – Steve Lieberman, Jewish-American singer, songwriter, and musician
- June 22
  - Rocío Banquells, Mexican pop singer and actress
  - Jennifer Finney Boylan, American author
  - Bruce Campbell, American actor, producer, writer and director
- June 24
  - Tommy Lister Jr., American actor and professional wrestler (d. 2020)
  - Jean Charest, Canadian lawyer and 29th premier of Quebec
- June 25 – Serik Akhmetov, 8th Prime Minister of Kazakhstan
- June 26
  - Jonathan Bate, British author, scholar, and cleric
  - Pedro Cateriano, former Prime Minister of Peru
  - Suresh Gopi, Indian actor, playback singer, television presenter and politician
- June 27 – Magnus Lindberg, Finnish composer
- June 29
  - Rosa Mota, Portuguese long-distance runner
  - Ralf Rangnick, German football coach, executive, and player
- June 30
  - Ziggy Rozalski, Polish American boxing manager and promoter
  - Esa-Pekka Salonen, Finnish conductor and composer
  - Irina Vorobieva, Russian pair skater
  - Vasil Yakusha, Belarusian rower

=== July ===
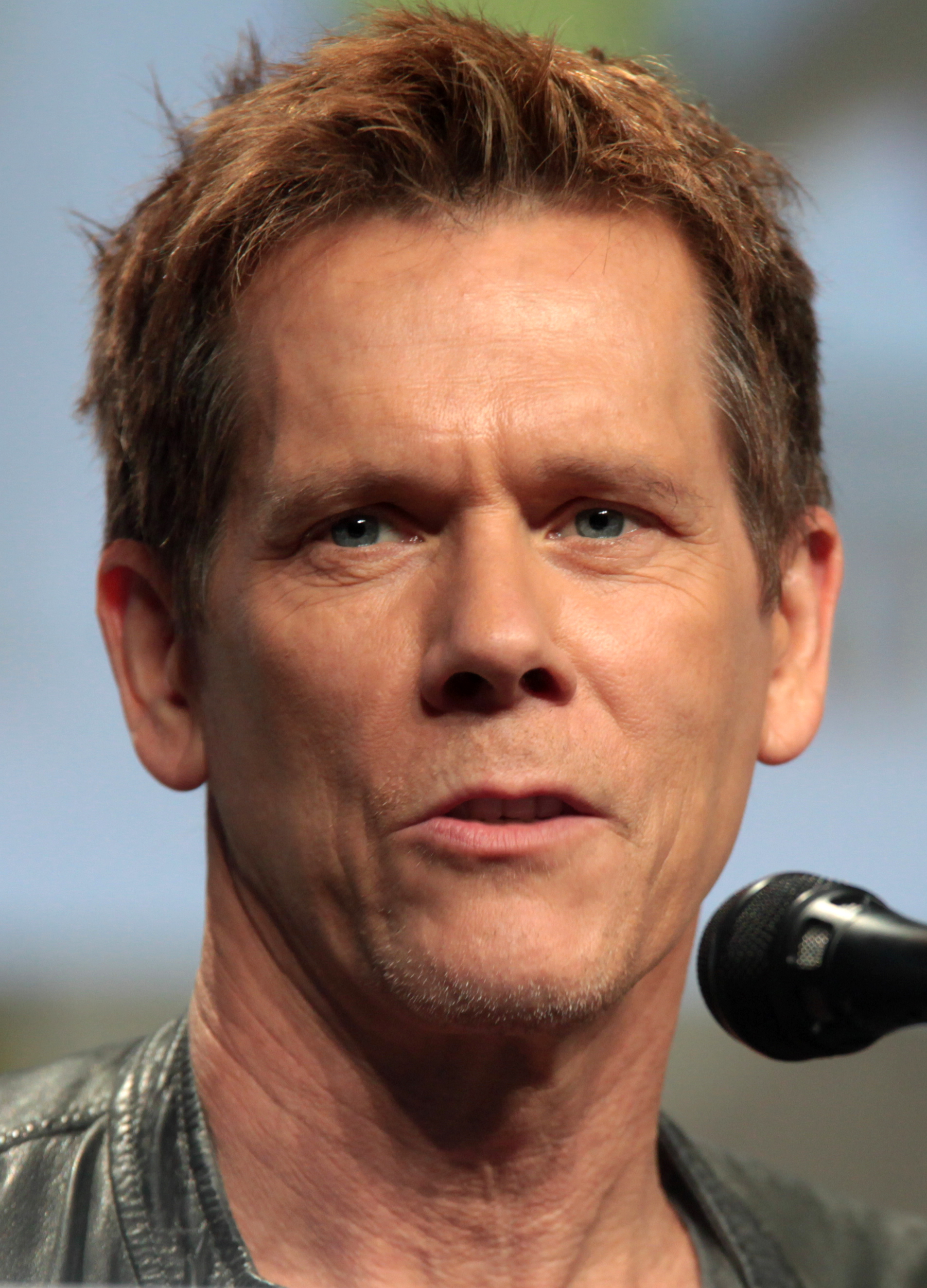
Kevin Bacon

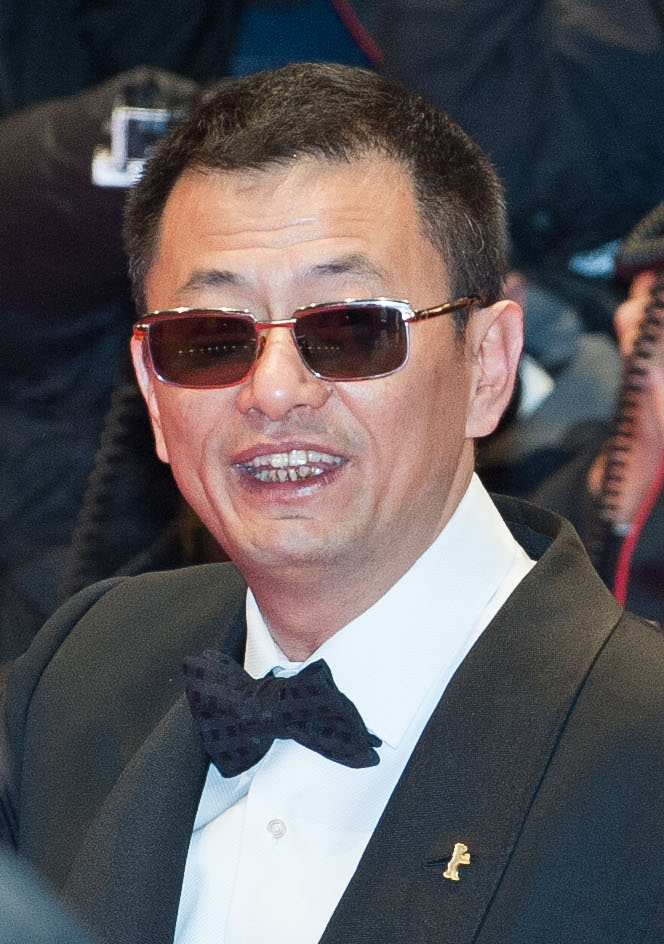
Wong Kar-wai

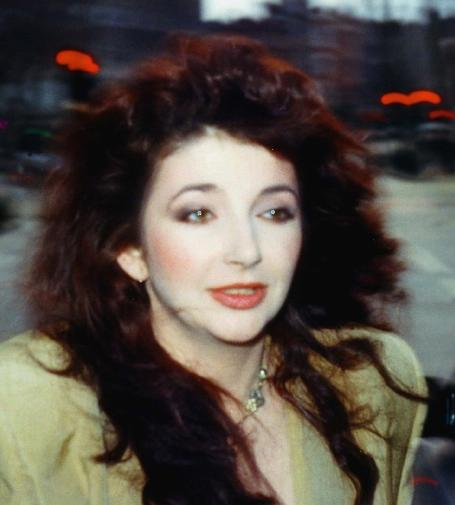
Kate Bush

- July 1
  - Mary Fahl, American singer, songwriter and actress
  - Tom Magee, Canadian world champion powerlifter and strongman competitor
- July 2 – Pavan Malhotra, Indian actor
- July 5
  - Avigdor Lieberman, Soviet-born Israeli politician
  - Bill Watterson, American cartoonist (Calvin and Hobbes)
- July 6 – Jennifer Saunders, British comedian and actress
- July 7 – Michala Petri, Danish recorder player
- July 8
  - Jackson Anthony, Sri Lankan actor (d. 2023)
  - Kevin Bacon, American actor
  - Robert Cassilly, American politician
  - Richard Moth, Rhodesian-born British Catholic archbishop
  - Neetu Singh, Indian actress
- July 10 – Fiona Shaw, Irish-born actress
- July 11 – Hugo Sánchez, Mexican football player and coach
- July 13 – Roger L. Jackson, American voice actor
- July 14
  - Mircea Geoană, Romanian politician and diplomat
  - Jujie Luan, Chinese-Canadian fencer
  - Scott Rudin, American producer
- July 15 – Jörg Kachelmann, Swiss presenter, journalist and entrepreneur in the meteorological field
- July 16 – Michael Flatley, Irish-born dancer
- July 17 – Wong Kar-wai, Hong Kong second wave filmmaker
- July 19 – Azumah Nelson, Ghanaian boxer
- July 20 – Billy Mays, American television salesperson (d. 2009)
- July 21 – Dave Henderson, American baseball player (d. 2015)
- July 25 – Thurston Moore, American guitarist, singer and songwriter
- July 27 – Christopher Dean, British ice dancer and Olympian
- July 28 – Terry Fox, Canadian athlete and cancer activist (d. 1981)
- July 30 – Kate Bush, English singer-songwriter
- July 31
  - Bill Berry, American rock drummer
  - Mark Cuban, American entrepreneur and basketball team owner

=== August ===
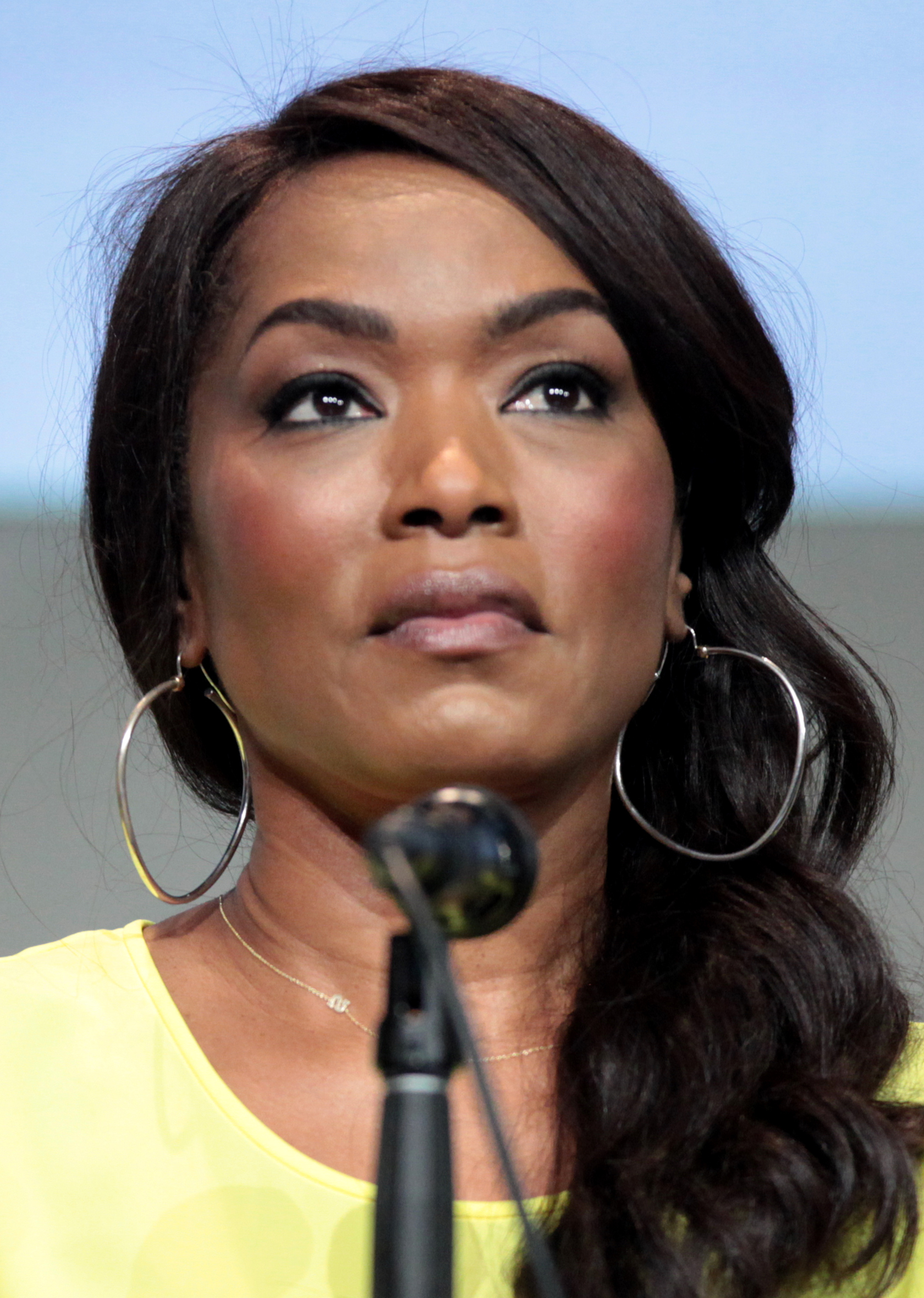
Angela Bassett

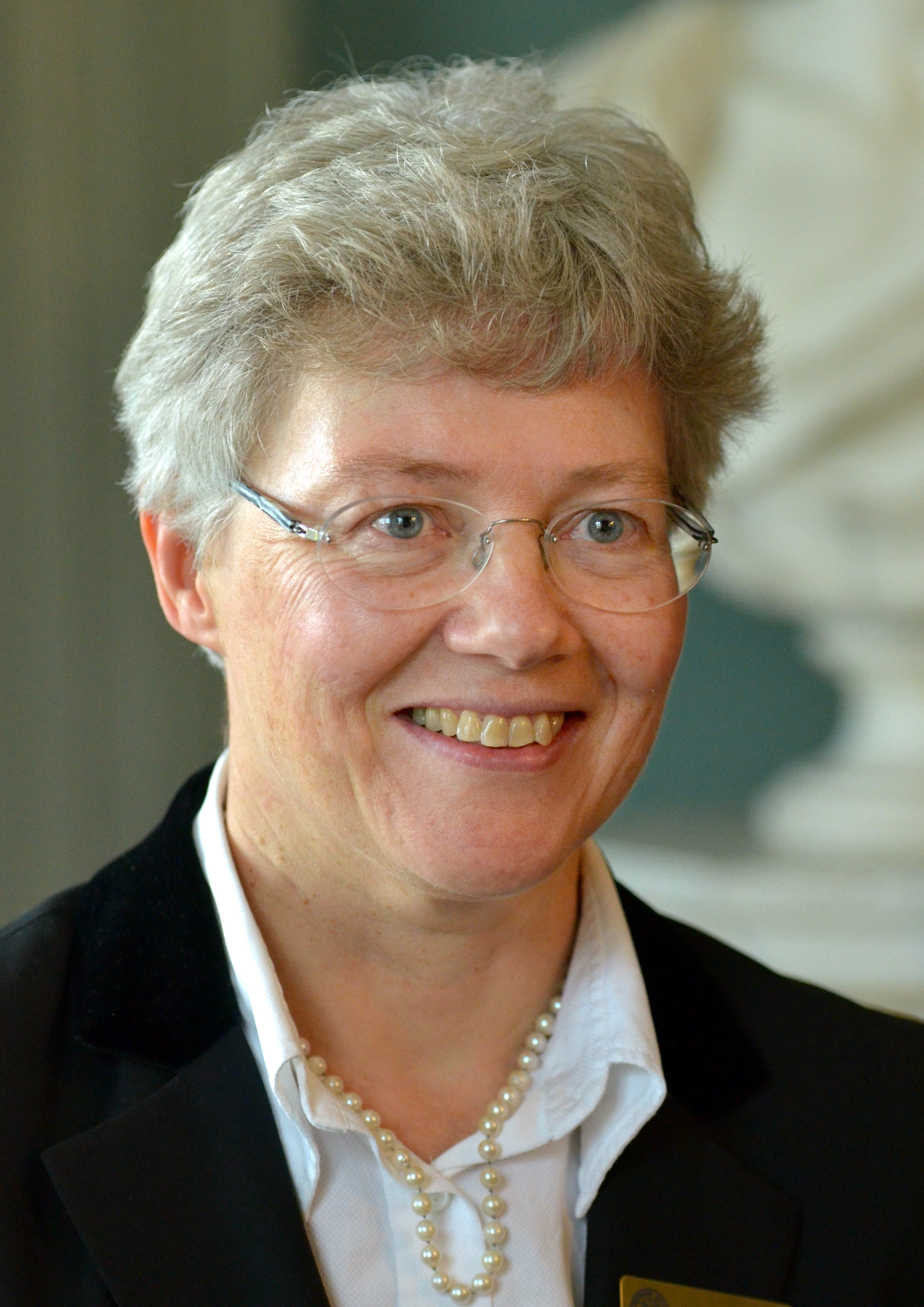
Anne L'Huillier

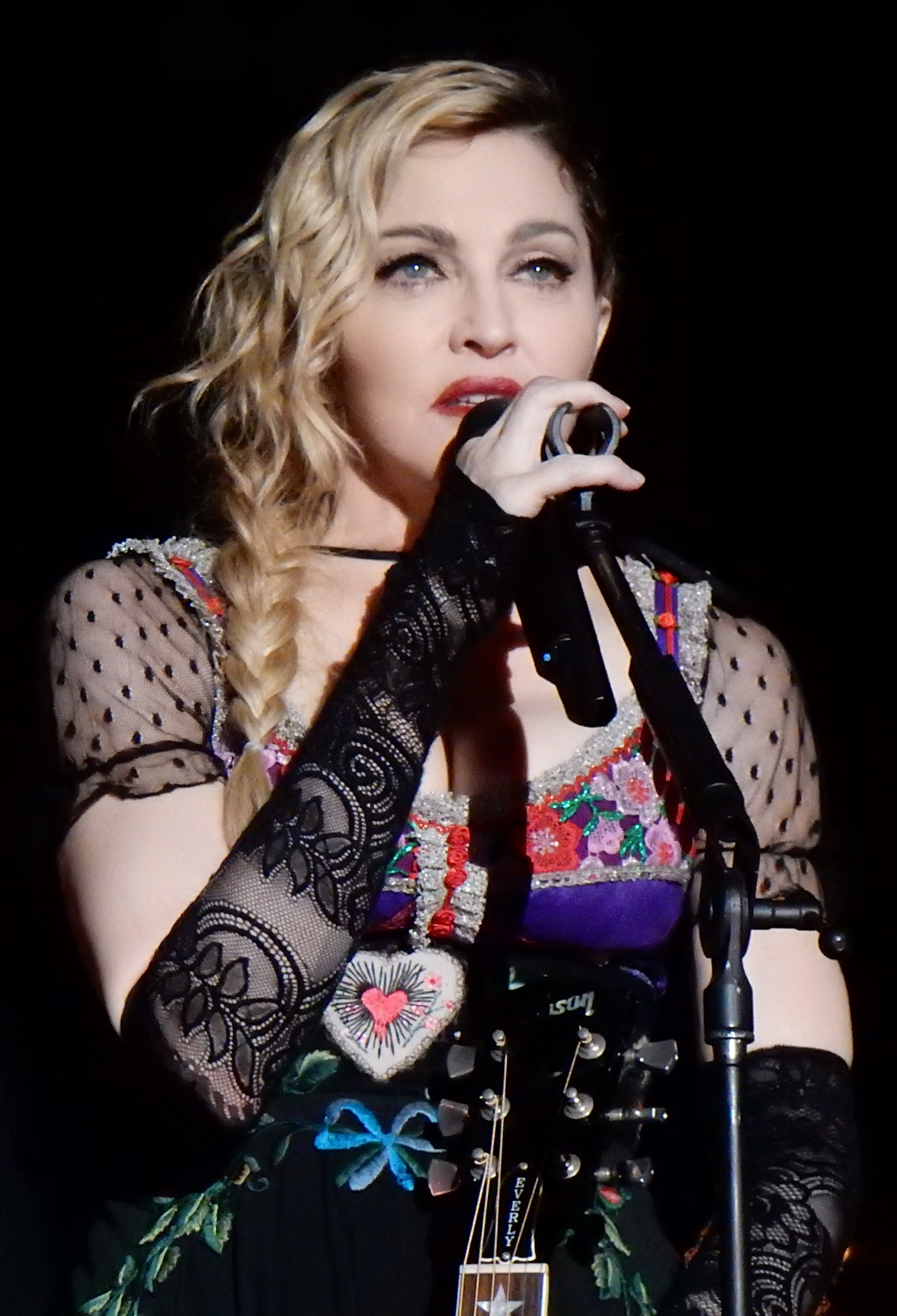
Madonna

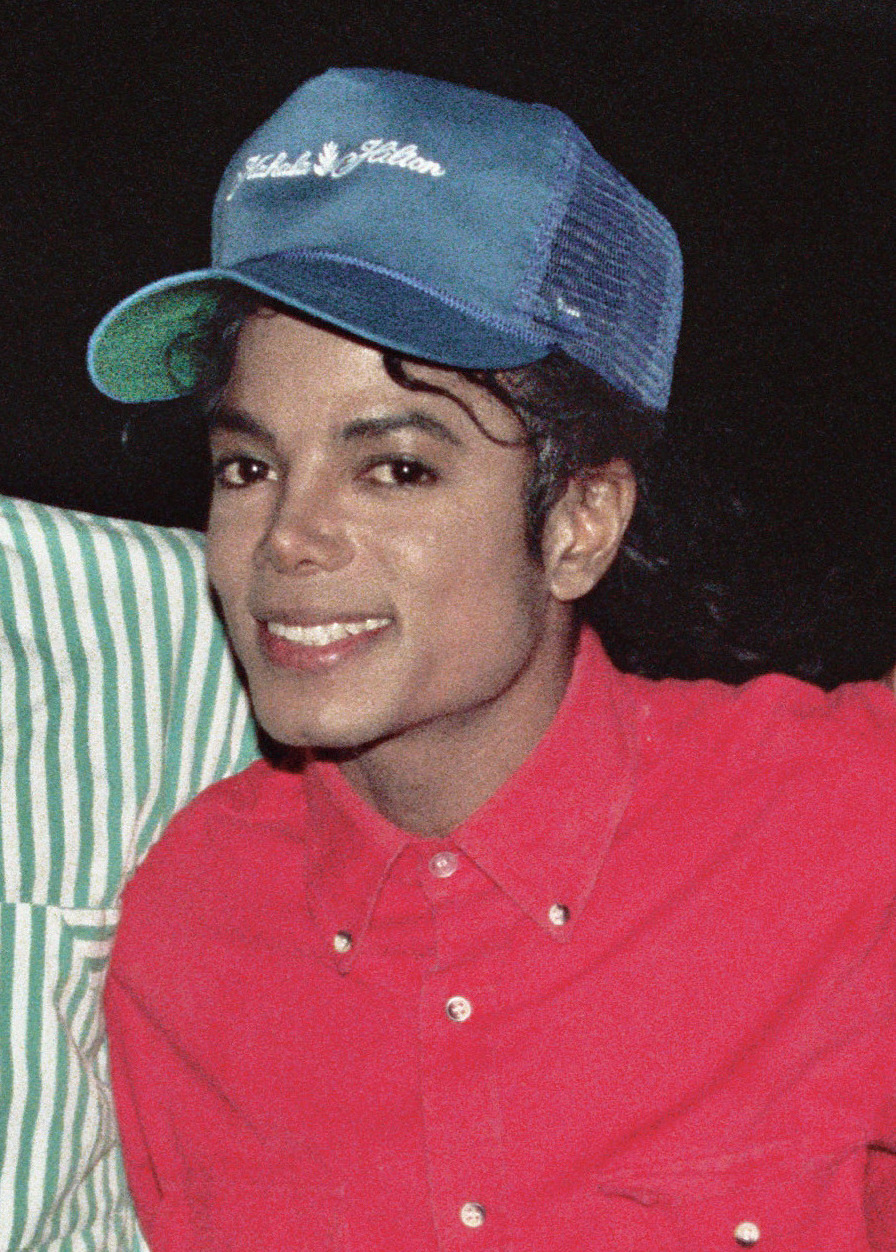
Michael Jackson

- August 3 – Lambert Wilson, French actor
- August 5 – Andriy Fedetskyi, Ukrainian football player (d. 2018)
- August 7 – Bruce Dickinson, English musician (Iron Maiden)
- August 8 – Iván Arias, Bolivian politician, political analyst, and sociologist
- August 10 – Rami Hamdallah, Palestinian politician
- August 15 – Simon Baron-Cohen, British psychologist and professor
- August 16
  - Angela Bassett, African-American actress
  - Anne L'Huillier, French-born atomic physicist, Nobel Prize laureate
  - Madonna, American-born singer-songwriter and actress
- August 17 – Belinda Carlisle, American singer
- August 18
  - Reg E. Cathey, African-American actor (d. 2018)
  - Madeleine Stowe, American actress
  - Didier Auriol, French rally driver
- August 19
  - Brendan Nelson, Australian politician
  - Darryl Sutter, Canadian ice hockey coach and player
  - Rick Snyder, American business executive and politician
- August 21 – Steve Case, American businessman, investor, and philanthropist
- August 22 – Colm Feore, American-born Canadian actor
- August 23
  - Julio Franco, Dominican baseball player and coach
  - Bill Haslam, American billionaire businessman and politician
- August 24
  - Steve Guttenberg, American actor
  - Yan Lianke, Chinese writer
- August 25 – Tim Burton, American film director
- August 27 – Kathy Hochul, American politician, Governor of New York
- August 29
  - Michael Jackson, African-American singer-songwriter and dancer (d. 2009)
  - Sir Lenny Henry, English comedian and actor
  - Mick Harvey, Australian musician and singer-songwriter
- August 30 – Anna Politkovskaya, Russian investigative journalist (d. 2006)

=== September ===
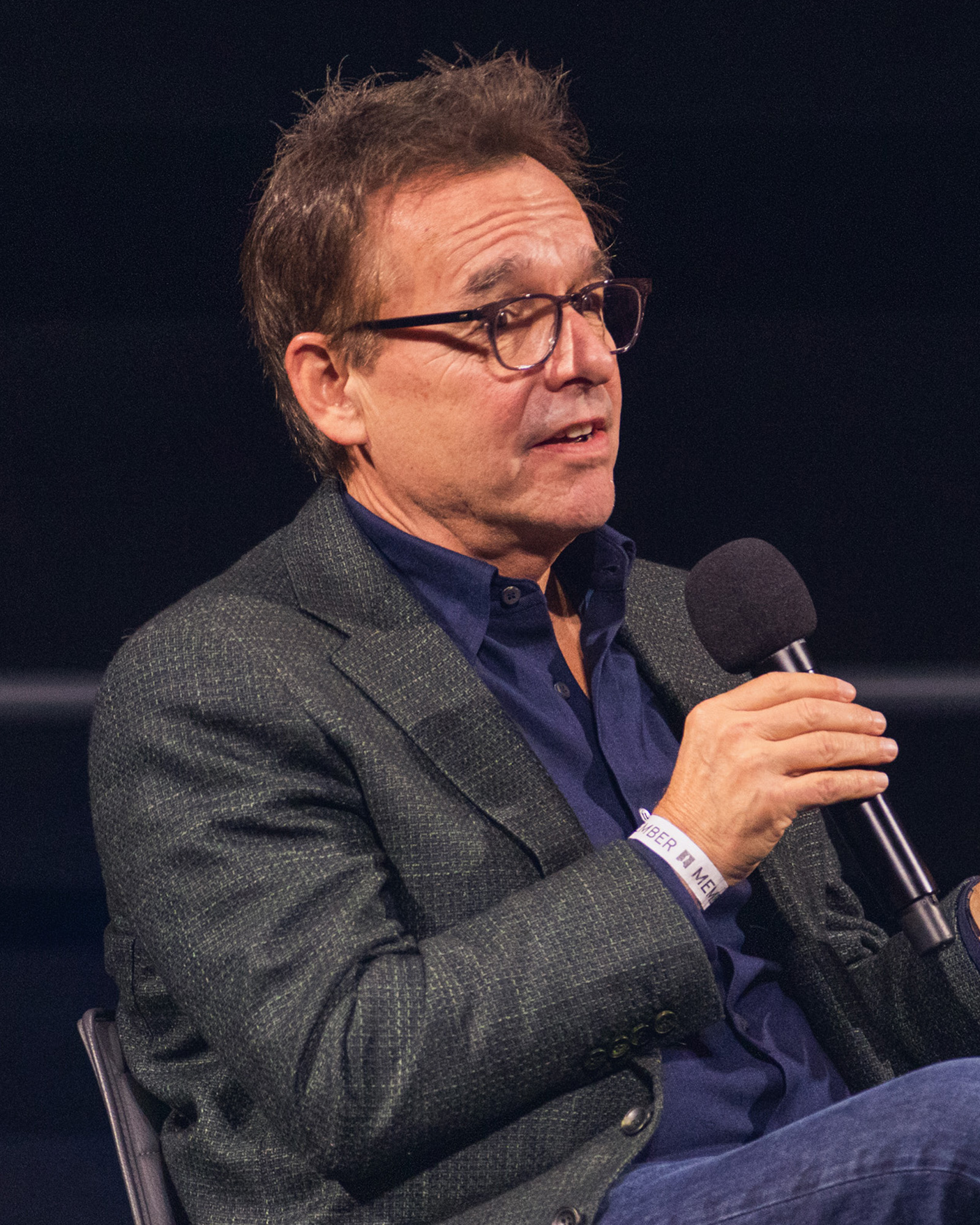
Chris Columbus

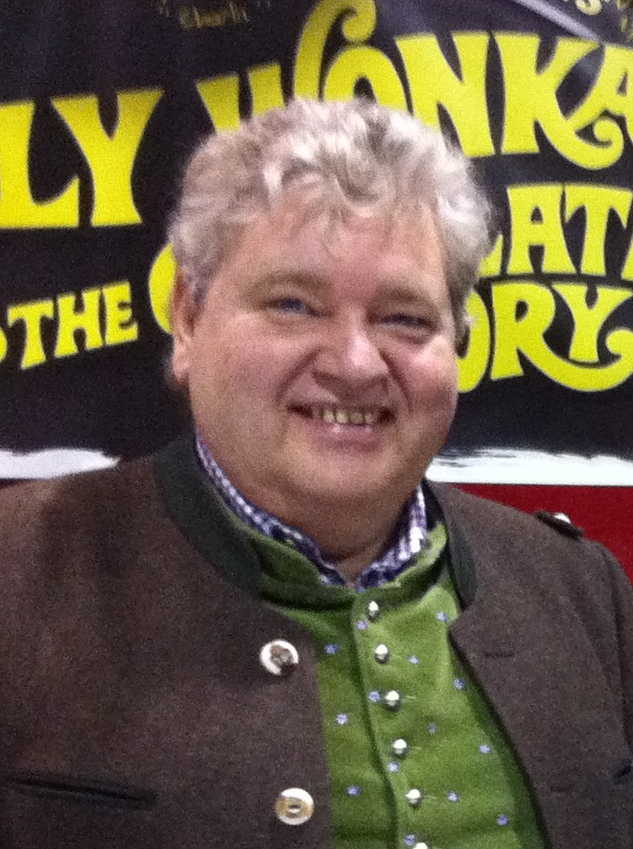
Michael Böllner

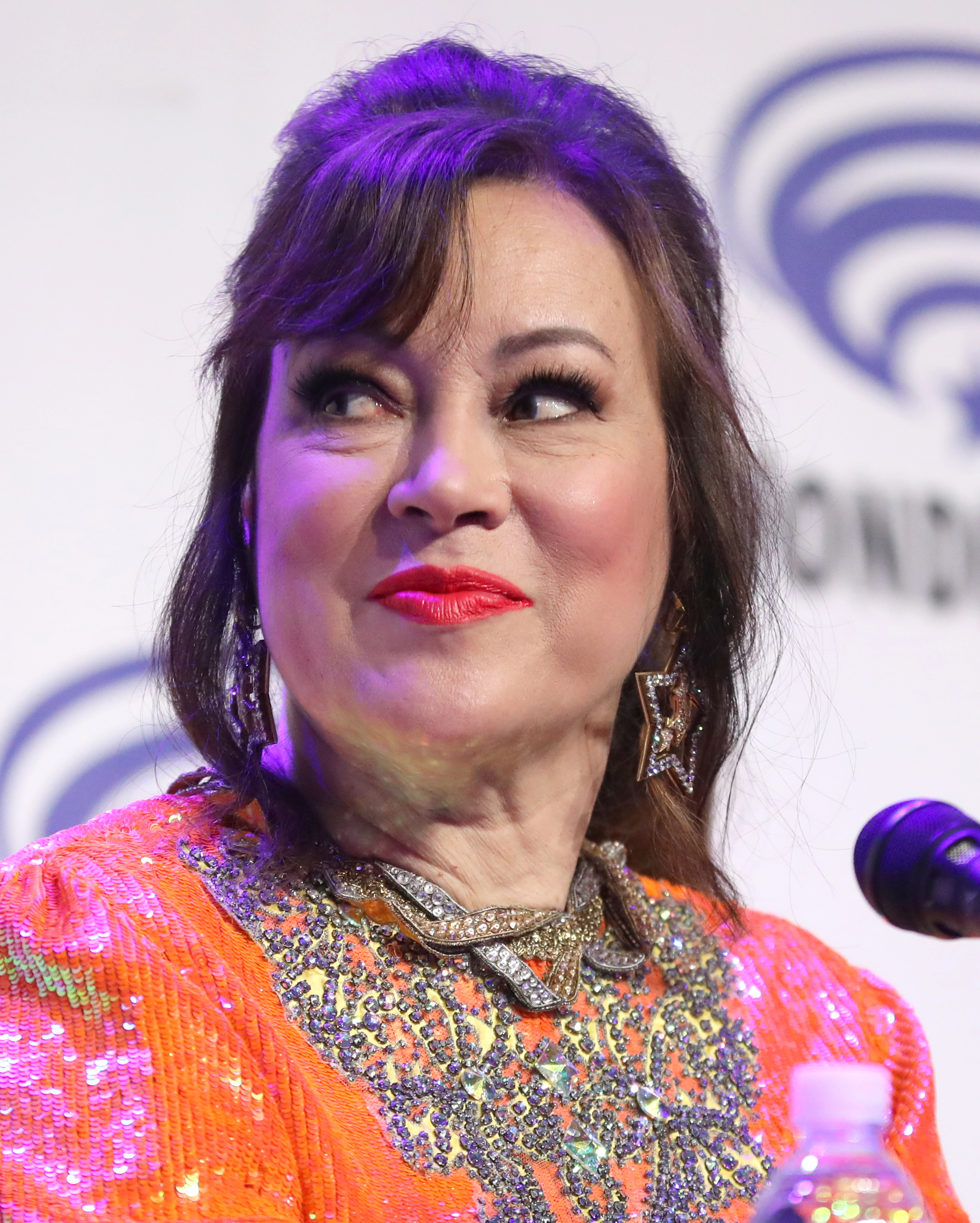
Jennifer Tilly

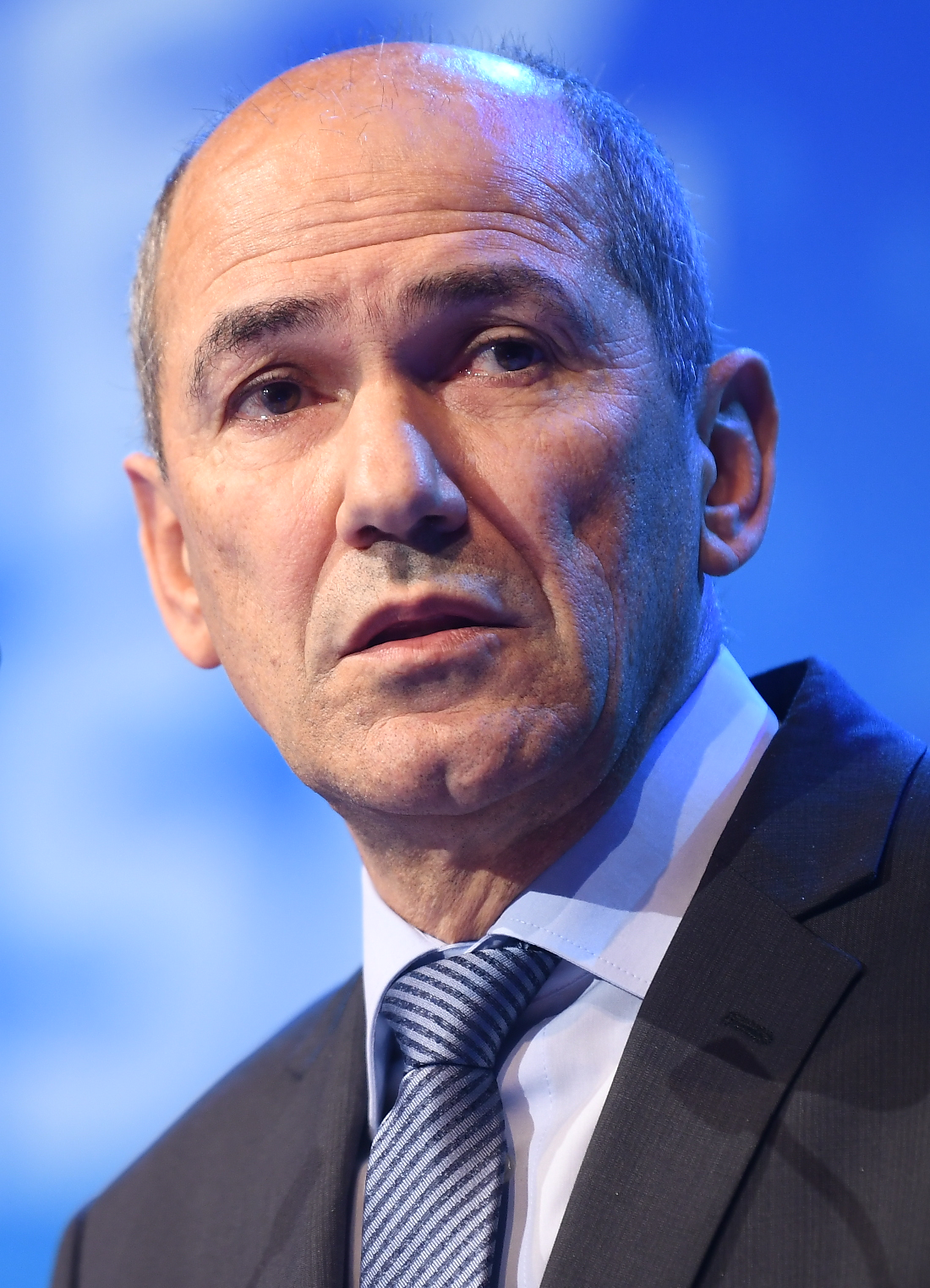
Janez Janša

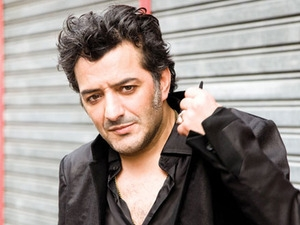
Rachid Taha

- September 2 – Zdravko Krivokapić, Montenegrin politician, Prime Minister of Montenegro
- September 4 – Drew Pinsky, American media personality and physician
- September 6
  - Jeff Foxworthy, American comedian, actor and author
  - The Barbarian, Tongan professional wrestler
- September 7
  - Danny Chan, Hong Kong singer, songwriter and actor (d. 1993)
  - Goran Hadžić, Croatian Serb politician and President the Republic of Serbian Krajina during the Croatian War of Independence
  - Peter Mettler, Swiss-Canadian film director and cinematographer
- September 10 – Chris Columbus, American film director/writer/producer
- September 11 – Roxann Dawson, American actress and director
- September 12 – Wilfred Benítez, Puerto Rican professional boxer
- September 14 – Michael Böllner, German actor and tax accountant
- September 16
  - Jennifer Tilly, Canadian/American actress
  - Orel Hershiser, American baseball player
- September 17
  - Janez Janša, 2-Time Prime Minister of Slovenia
  - Marc Buie, American astronomer
- September 18 – Rachid Taha, Algerian singer and activist (d. 2018)
- September 19
  - Lita Ford, British musician
  - Lucky Ali, Indian singer, songwriter, and actor
- September 20 – Arn Anderson, American wrestling road agent, author, and wrestler
- September 22
  - Andrea Bocelli, Italian tenor
  - Joan Jett, American rock musician
  - Renel Brooks-Moon, American radio personality
- September 23 – Marvin Lewis, American football coach
- September 24
  - Kevin Sorbo, American actor
  - Byron Brown, American politician
- September 27 – Irvine Welsh, Scottish writer
- September 28 – Rob Manfred, American lawyer and business executive
- September 29 — Jahna Steele, American entertainer and showgirl (d. 2008)
- September 30 – Marty Stuart, American singer, songwriter, and musician

=== October ===
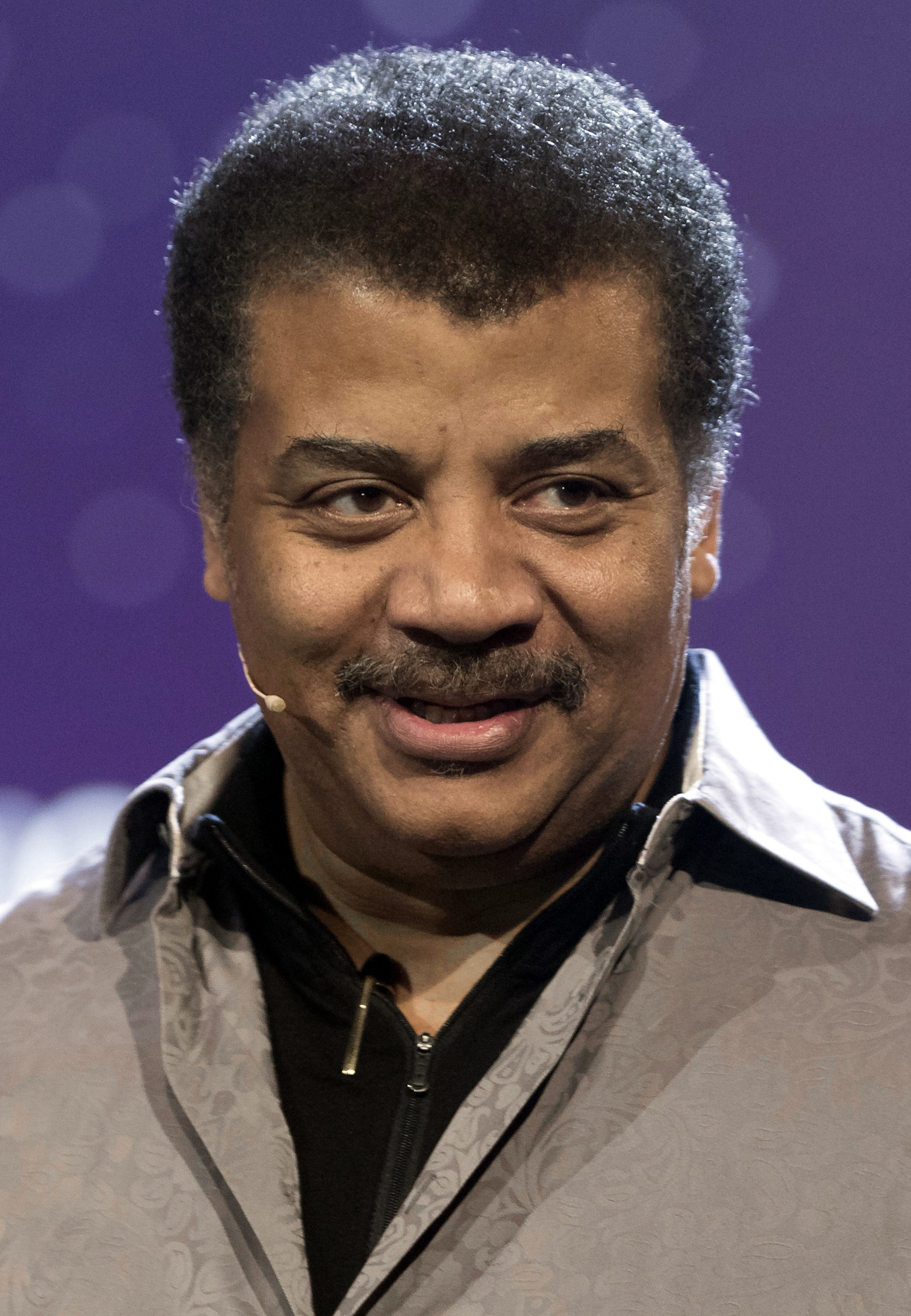
Neil deGrasse Tyson

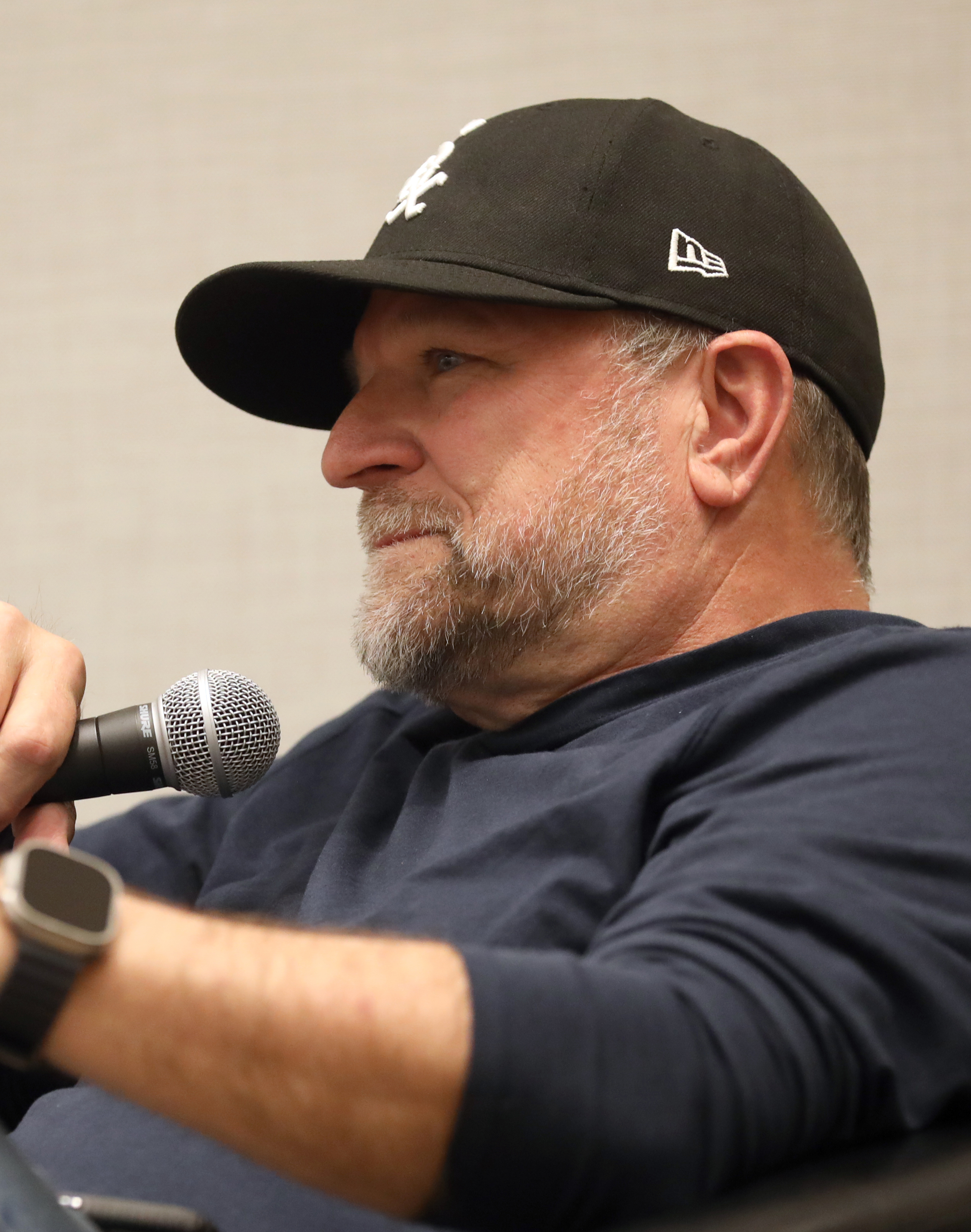
Ned Luke

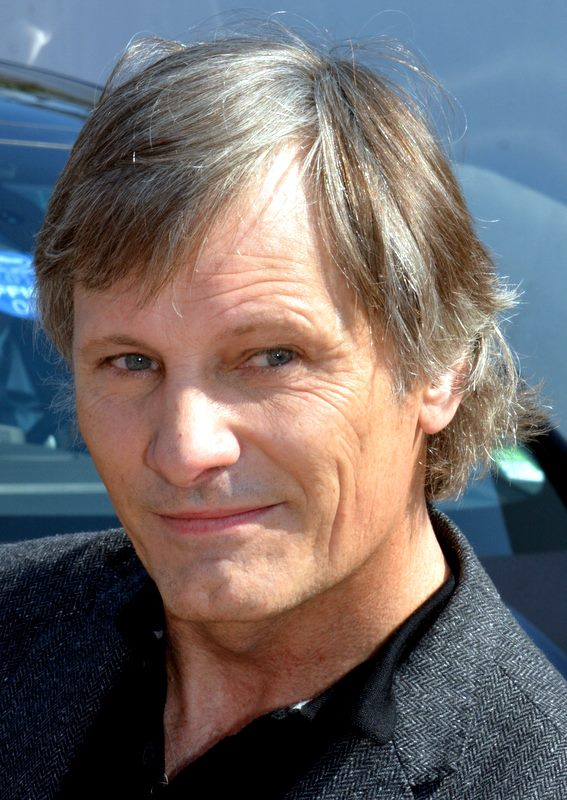
Viggo Mortensen

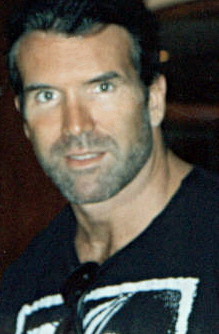
Scott Hall

- October 3 – Chen Yanyin, Chinese sculptor
- October 4 – Ned Luke, American actor
- October 5 – Neil deGrasse Tyson, American astrophysicist and science communicator
- October 7 – Bernardo Arévalo, president of Guatemala
- October 8 – Ursula von der Leyen, German politician, President of the European Commission
- October 9
  - Yuriy Boyko, Ukrainian politician and former Vice Prime Minister
  - Mike Singletary, American football player and coach
- October 10
  - Tanya Tucker, American singer
  - John M. Grunsfeld, American physicist and astronaut
  - Bruce Harrell, American politician and attorney
- October 13
  - Jamal Khashoggi, Saudi journalist (d. 2018)
  - Maria Cantwell, US Senator
- October 14 – Thomas Dolby, English musician
- October 16 – Tim Robbins, American actor and film director
- October 17 – Alan Jackson, American country music singer-songwriter
- October 18 – Thomas Hearns, American boxer
- October 19
  - Dario Franceschini, Italian lawyer, writer, and politician
  - Michael Steele, American politician, attorney, and political commentator
- October 20
  - Viggo Mortensen, Danish-American actor
  - Scott Hall, American professional wrestler (d. 2022)
- October 21 – Andre Geim, Dutch–British physicist
- October 23 – Tony Christiansen, New Zealand motivational speaker
- October 24 – Rushern Baker, American lawyer and politician
- October 25 – Kornelia Ender, German swimmer
- October 26 – Pascale Ogier, French actress (d. 1984)
- October 27 – Simon Le Bon, English rock singer
- October 28 – Raúl Pellegrin, Chilean revolutionary, leader of Manuel Rodríguez Patriotic Front (d. 1988)
- October 30 – Abhijeet Bhattacharya, Indian playback singer
- October 31
  - Jeannie Longo, French cyclist
  - Simon Poidevin, Australian rugby union player
  - Md. Abdul Mohit Talukder, Bangladeshi politician

=== November ===
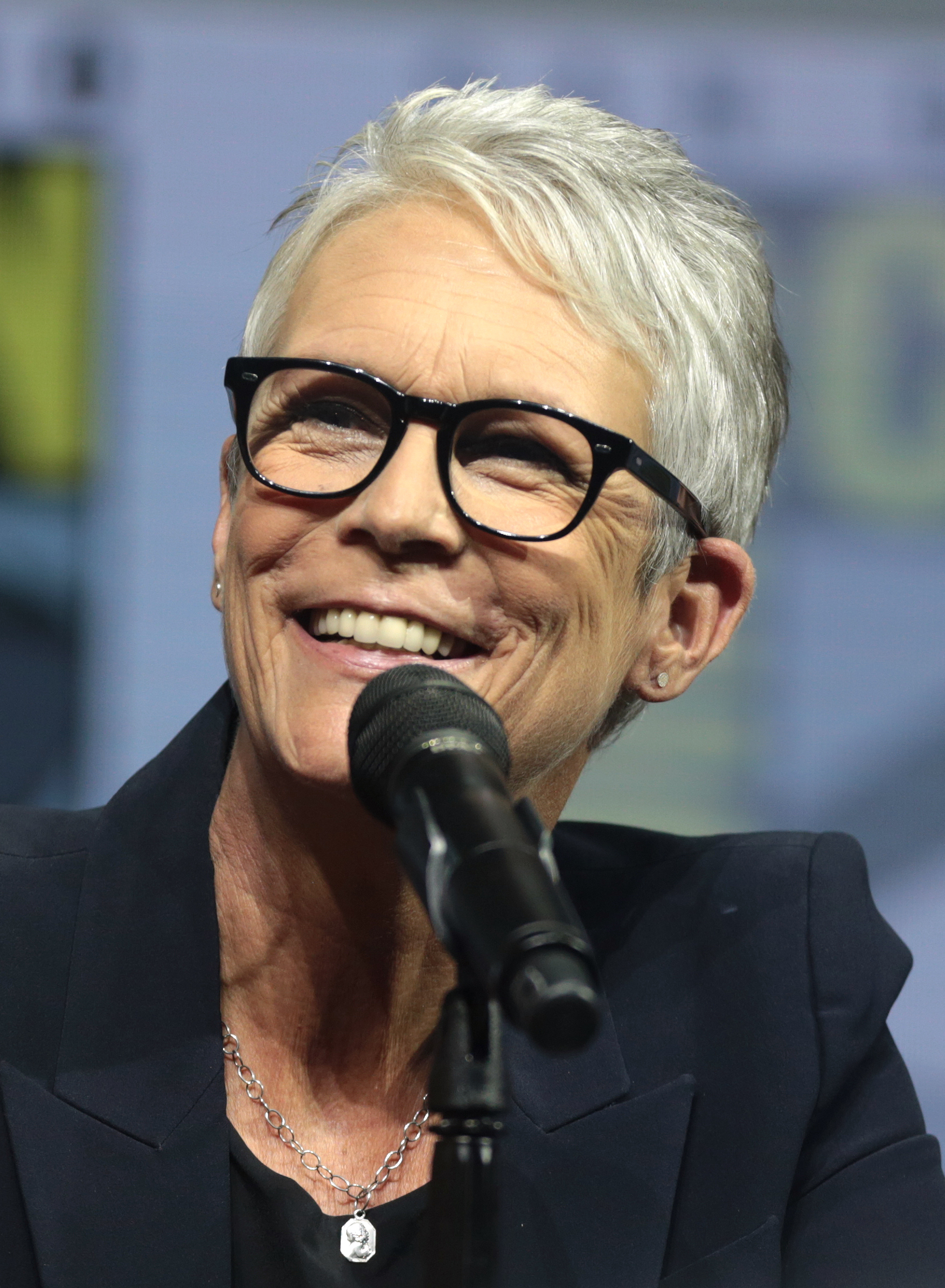
Jamie Lee Curtis

- November 5 – Robert Patrick, American actor
- November 7 – Dmitry Kozak, Russian politician and deputy Prime Minister of Russia
- November 11 – Teresa Cheng, Hong Kong Senior Counsel, arbitrator and politician
- November 13 – Stephenson King, former Prime Minister of Saint Lucia
- November 12 – Megan Mullally, American actress, singer and media personality
- November 16
  - Sooronbay Jeenbekov, President of Kyrgyzstan
  - Marg Helgenberger, American actress
  - Roberto Guerrero, Colombian-American racing driver
- November 17 – Mary Elizabeth Mastrantonio, American actress and singer
- November 18
  - Daniel Brailovsky, Argentine-born Israeli footballer and manager
  - Oscar Nunez, American actor, comedian
- November 19 – Charlie Kaufman, American screenwriter, film director, and novelist
- November 21 – Rickson Gracie, Brazilian mixed martial artist
- November 22
  - Jamie Lee Curtis, American actress
  - Ibrahim Ismail of Johor, Sultan of Johor
- November 27 – Paul Gosar, American politician and dentist
- November 28 – Tanya Harford, South African tennis player
- November 29 – John Mahama, President of Ghana

=== December ===
- December 1
  - Candace Bushnell, American writer (Sex & the City), journalist and television producer
  - Gary Peters, US Senator
  - Charlene Tilton, American actress
  - Javier Aguirre, Mexican football player and manager
  - Kwesi Ahoomey-Zunu, eleventh Prime Minister of Togo
- December 2
  - George Saunders, American writer
  - Lal, Indian actor, director, screenwriter, producer and distributor
- December 6 – Nick Park, English filmmaker and animator
- December 7
  - Rick Rude, American professional wrestler (d. 1999)
  - Marie-Louise Coleiro Preca, former President of Malta
- December 8
  - Arlette Sombo-Dibélé, Central African lawyer and politician
  - Vitaly Mutko, Deputy Prime Minister of Russia from 2016 to 2020
- December 10
  - Cornelia Funke, German author
  - Ahmad Shabery Cheek, Malaysian politician
  - Phạm Minh Chính, Prime Minister of Vietnam
- December 11 – Nikki Sixx, American rock musician
- December 12 – Sheree J. Wilson, American actress
- December 13 – Allan K., Filipino comedian, actor, and television personality
- December 17 – Jayasudha, Indian actress and politician
- December 24
  - D. Suresh Babu, Indian film producer, studio owner and film distributor
  - Michael Flynn, American lieutenant general and former U.S. national security advisor
- December 25
  - Dimi Mint Abba, Mauritanian musician and singer (d. 2011)
  - Alannah Myles, Canadian singer-songwriter
  - Rickey Henderson, American baseball player (d. 2024)
- December 27
  - Shahid Khaqan Abbasi, 18th Prime Minister of Pakistan
  - Barbara Crampton, American actress and producer
- December 28 – Joe Diffie, American country music singer and songwriter (d. 2020)
- December 29 – Lakhdar Belloumi, Algerian football player
- December 30 – Lav Diaz, Filipino filmmaker and film critic
- December 31 – Bebe Neuwirth, American actress

=== Other ===
- David Charles Abell, American conductor
- Dave Allen, American television and film actor and comedian
- Bronwyn Bancroft, Aboriginal Australian artist, administrator, book illustrator, and fashion designer
- David Breskin, American writer, poet, and record producer
- Vincenzo de Cotiis, artist and designer
- Pamela Geller, American far-right political commentator and conspiracy theorist
- James Giles, Canadian philosopher and psychologist
- Nicky Hager, New Zealand investigative journalist
- Randy Hillier, Canadian politician
- Vickie Roach, Aboriginal Australian activist
- Raed Salah, Palestinian religious leader
- Doris Salcedo, Colombian artist
- Hamza Yusuf, American Islamic scholar, neo-traditionalist, and co-founder of Zaytuna College

== Deaths ==
=== January ===
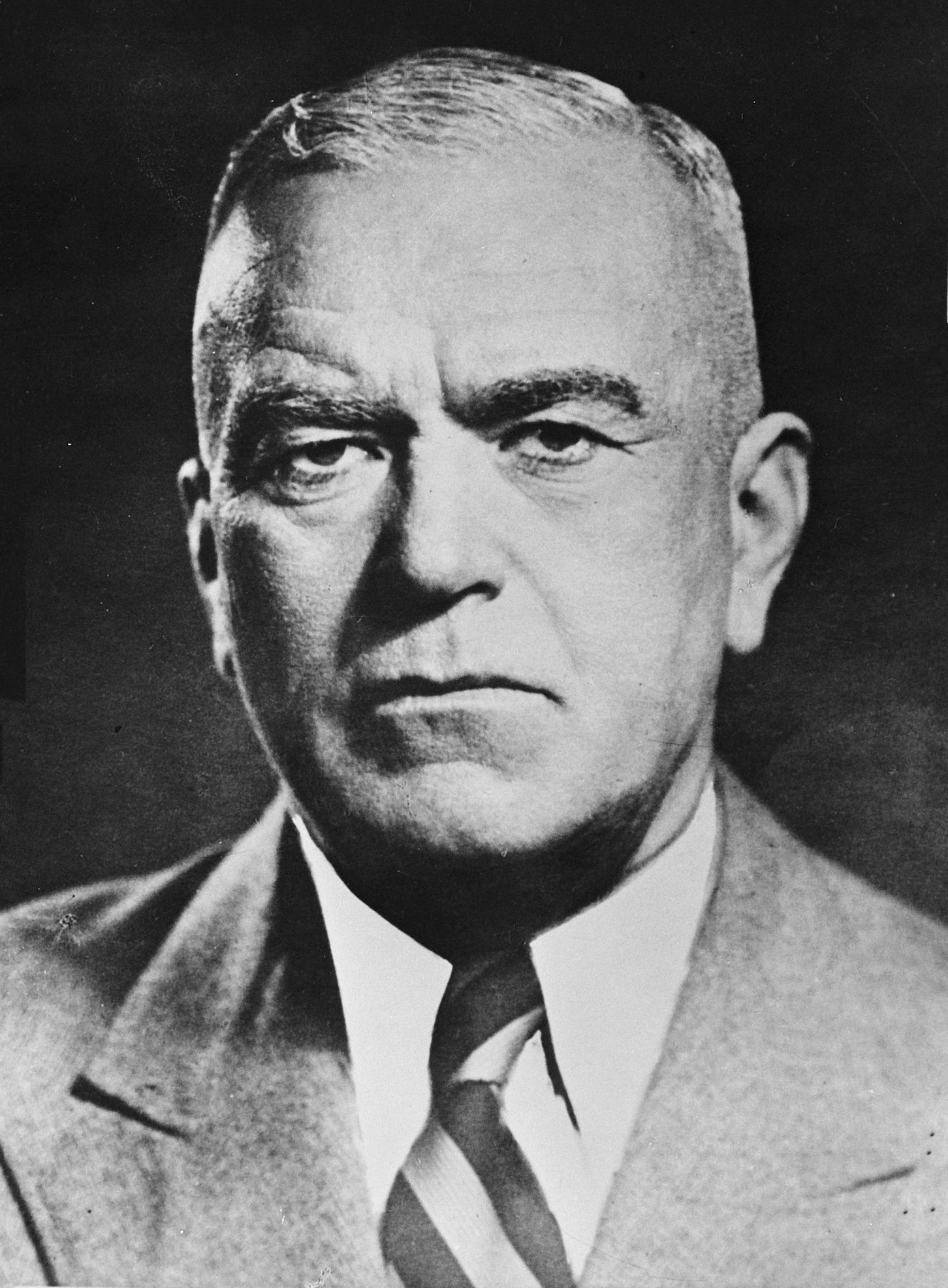
Petru Groza

Prince Oskar of Prussia

- January 1 – Edward Weston, American photographer (b. 1886)
- January 4 – John Anderson, 1st Viscount Waverley, Scottish civil servant and politician (b. 1882)
- January 7 – Petru Groza, Romanian politician, 46th Prime Minister of Romania (b. 1884)
- January 8
  - Mary Colter, American architect (b. 1869)
  - Paul Pilgrim, American athlete (b. 1883)
- January 13
  - Jesse L. Lasky, American film producer (b. 1880)
  - Edna Purviance, American actress (b. 1895)
- January 19 – Cândido Rondon, Brazilian military officer (b. 1865)
- January 20 – Ataúlfo Argenta, Spanish conductor and pianist (b. 1913)
- January 27 – Prince Oskar of Prussia (b. 1888)
- January 30 – Ernst Heinkel, German aircraft designer and manufacturer (b. 1888)

=== February ===
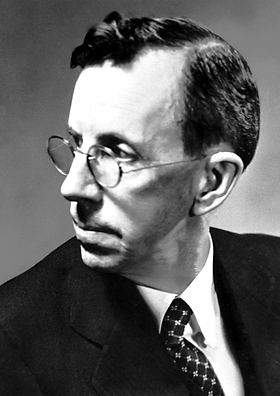
Clinton Davisson

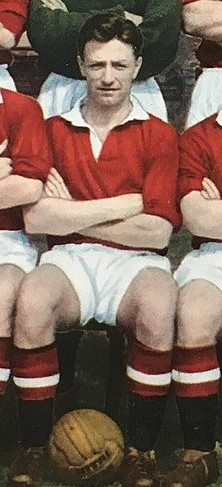
Roger Byrne

- February 1 – Clinton Davisson, American physicist, Nobel Prize laureate (b. 1881)
- February 6 – Manchester United footballers and journalists who died in Munich air disaster
  - Geoff Bent (b. 1932)
  - Roger Byrne (b. 1929)
  - Eddie Colman (b. 1936)
  - Mark Jones (b. 1933)
  - David Pegg (b. 1935)
  - Tommy Taylor (b. 1932)
  - Liam "Billy" Whelan (b. 1935)
  - Frank Swift (b. 1913)
- February 10 – Nezihe Muhiddin, Turkish suffragette and journalist (b. 1889)
- February 11 – Ernest Jones, Welsh neurologist and psychoanalyst (b. 1879)
- February 13
  - Christabel Pankhurst, English suffragette (b. 1880)
  - Georges Rouault, French painter (b. 1871)
- February 21
  - Henryk Arctowski, Polish scientist and explorer (b. 1871)
  - Duncan Edwards English footballer, died from injuries sustained in the Munich air disaster (b. 1936)
- February 27 – Harry Cohn, American film producer (b. 1891)

=== March ===
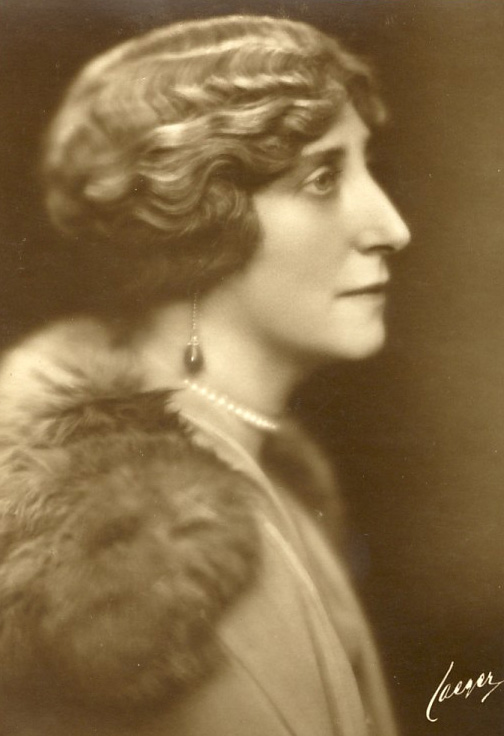
Princess Ingeborg of Denmark

- March 1 – Giacomo Balla, Italian painter (b. 1871)
- March 6 – Anton Reinthaller, Austrian politician (b. 1895)
- March 11 – Ole Kirk Christiansen, Danish businessman, founder of The Lego Group (b. 1891)
- March 12 – Princess Ingeborg of Denmark (b. 1878)
- March 13 – Vallathol Narayana Menon, Malayalam poet (b. 1878)
- March 22 – Mike Todd, American film director, in aviation accident (b. 1907)
- March 23 – Florian Znaniecki, Polish philosopher and sociologist (b, 1882)
- March 25 – Eileen Sharp, English singer and actress (b. 1900)
- March 28 – W. C. Handy, African-American blues composer (b. 1873)

=== April ===
Prince Ferdinand of Bavaria

- April 2
  - Willie Maley, Scottish football player and manager (b. 1868)
  - Jōsei Toda, Japanese educator and activist (b. 1900)
- April 5 – Prince Ferdinand of Bavaria (born 1884)
- April 8 – Alcibíades Arosemena, Panamanian politician, 15th President of Panama (b. 1883)
- April 15 – Estelle Taylor, American actress (b. 1894)
- April 16 – Rosalind Franklin, English crystallographer (b. 1920)
- April 17 – Rita Montaner, Cuban singer, pianist and actress (b. 1900)
- April 18 – Maurice Gamelin, French general (b. 1872)
- April 19 – Billy Meredith, Welsh footballer (b. 1874)

=== May ===
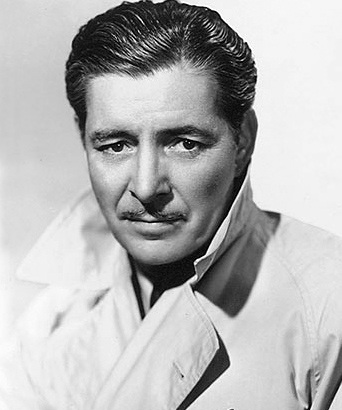
Ronald Colman

- May 2 – Henry Cornelius, South African-born director (b. 1913)
- May 5 – James Branch Cabell, American writer (b. 1879)
- May 9 – Koshirō Oikawa, Japanese admiral (b. 1883)
- May 19
  - Ronald Colman, English actor (b. 1891)
  - Marie Pujmanová, Czechoslovak poet and novelist (b. 1893)
  - Jadunath Sarkar, Indian historian (b. 1870)
- May 20 – Frédéric François-Marsal, 59th Prime Minister of France (b. 1874)
- May 26
  - Constantin Cantacuzino, Romanian aviator (b. 1905)
  - Cheong Yoke Choy, Chinese businessman and philanthropist (b. 1873)
- May 29 – Juan Ramón Jiménez, Spanish writer, Nobel Prize laureate (b. 1881)

=== June ===
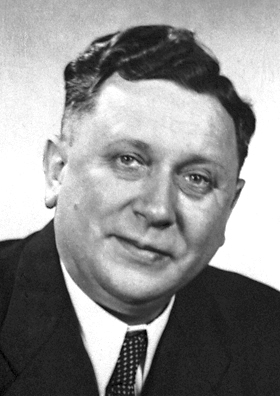
Kurt Alder

- June 9 – Robert Donat, English actor (b. 1905)
- June 12 – Kate Cory, American photographer and artist (d. 1861)
- June 16
  - Imre Nagy, Hungarian politician, 44th Prime Minister of Hungary (executed) (b. 1896)
  - Nereu Ramos, Brazilian politician, 20th President of Brazil (b. 1888)
- June 18 – Douglas Jardine, English cricketer (b. 1900)
- June 20 – Kurt Alder, German chemist, Nobel Prize laureate (b. 1902)
- June 24 – George Orton, Canadian athlete (b. 1873)
- June 25 – Alfred Noyes, English poet, short-story writer and playwright (b. 1880)

=== July ===
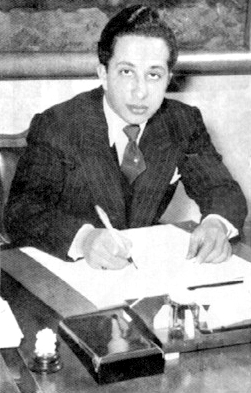
King Faisal II of Iraq

- July 1 – Rudolf von Laban, Austro-Hungarian dance artist, choreographer, and movement theorist (b. 1879)
- July 5 – Patriarch Vikentije II (b. 1890)
- July 9 – James H. Flatley, American naval aviator (b. 1906)
- July 14 (killed during coup d'état):
  - King Faisal II of Iraq (b. 1935; assassinated)
  - Abd al-Ilah, Prince of Iraq (b. 1913; assassinated)
  - Ibrahim Hashem, Jordanian lawyer and politician, 3-time Prime Minister of Jordan (b. 1888)
- July 15
  - Nuri al-Said, Iraqi politician, 7th Prime Minister of Iraq (b. 1888)
  - Julia Lennon, mother of John Lennon (b. 1914)
- July 17 – Henri Farman, French aviator and aircraft company founder (b. 1874)
- July 22 – Mikhail Zoshchenko, Russian and Soviet writer and satirist (b. 1894)
- July 25 – Harry Warner, American studio executive (b. 1881)
- July 27 – Claire Lee Chennault, American aviator and general, leader of the Flying Tigers (b. 1893)

=== August ===
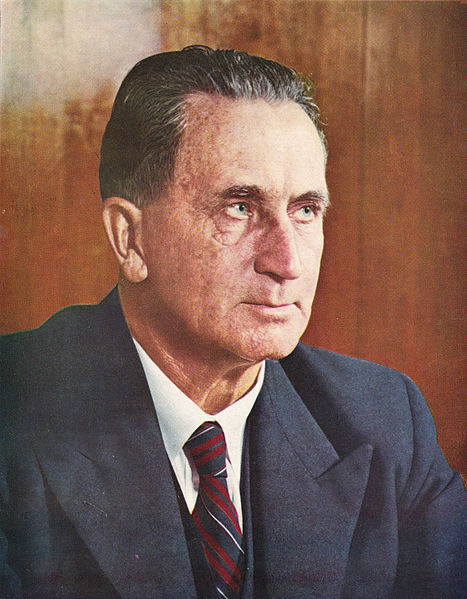
J. G. Strijdom

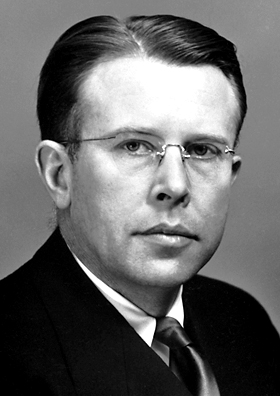
Ernest Lawrence

- August 1 – Albert E. Smith, English-born American stage magician, film director and producer (b. 1875)
- August 2 – Michele Navarra, Italian Sicilian Mafia boss (b. 1905)
- August 8 – Barbara Bennett, American actress (b. 1906)
- August 12 – Augustus Owsley Stanley, American politician (b. 1867)
- August 14
  - Big Bill Broonzy, American blues singer, composer (b. 1893) (some sources give his year of birth as 1903)
  - Frédéric Joliot-Curie, French physicist, recipient of the Nobel Prize in Chemistry (b. 1900)
- August 16
  - José Domingues dos Santos, Portuguese politician, 89th Prime Minister of Portugal (b. 1885)
  - Paul Panzer, German actor (b. 1872)
- August 21
  - Stevan Hristić, Yugoslav composer (b. 1885)
  - Kurt Neumann, German film director (b. 1908)
- August 22
  - Roger Martin du Gard, French writer, Nobel Prize laureate (b. 1881)
  - Dummy Taylor, American deaf baseball player
- August 24 – J. G. Strijdom, 5th Prime Minister of South Africa (b. 1893)
- August 26 – Ralph Vaughan Williams, English composer (b. 1872)
- August 27 – Ernest Lawrence, American physicist, Nobel Prize laureate (b. 1901)
- August 30 – John C. H. Lee, American army general (b. 1887)

=== September ===
Estate Tatanashvili

- September 11
  - Hans Grundig, German artist (b. 1901)
  - Robert W. Service, Scottish-born Canadian poet (b. 1874)
- September 15 - Snuffy Stirnweiss, professional baseball second baseman
- September 16 – Alma Bennett, American actress (b. 1904)
- September 20 – Jacques Delannoy, French footballer (b. 1912)
- September 22 – Mary Roberts Rinehart, American writer (b. 1876)
- September 23 – Walter F. Otto, German classical philologist (b. 1874)
- September 25 – John B. Watson, American psychologist (b. 1878)
- September 27 – Adolfo Salazar, Spanish historian, composer and diplomat (b. 1890)
- September 28 – Aarre Merikanto, Finnish composer (b. 1893)
- September 30 – Estate Tatanashvili, Soviet general (b. 1902)

=== October ===
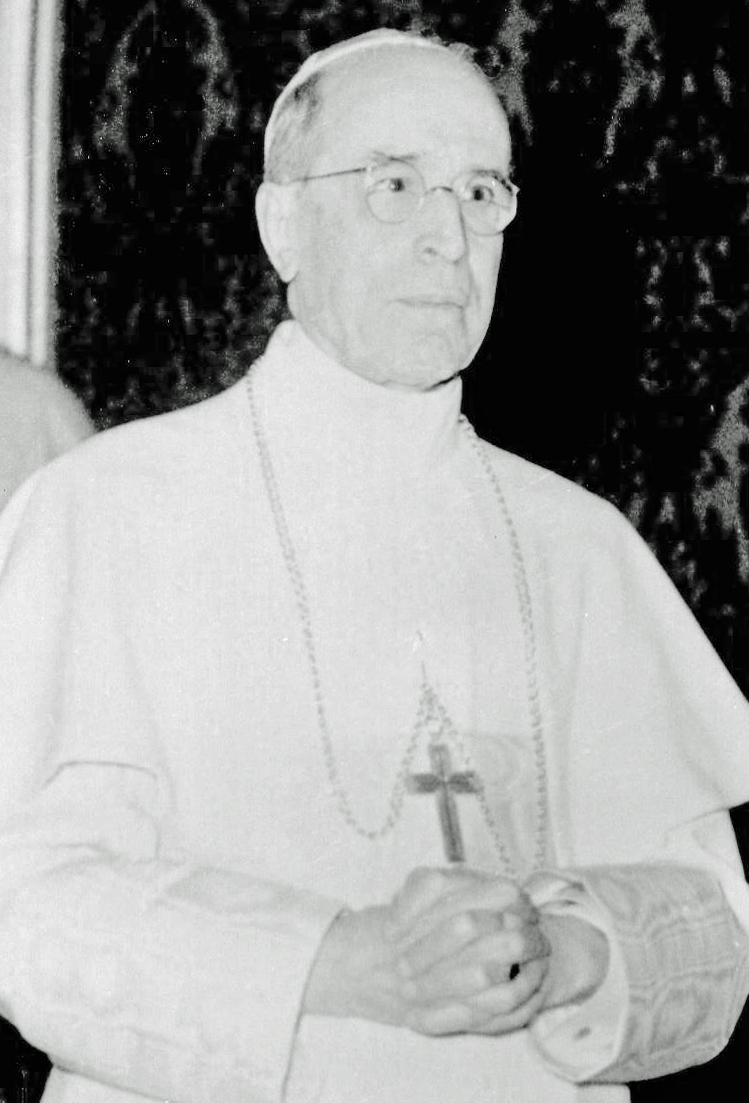
Pope Pius XII

- October 9 – Pope Pius XII (b. 1876)
- October 11 – Maurice de Vlaminck, French painter (b. 1876)
- October 14 – Sir Douglas Mawson, Australian geologist and polar explorer (b. 1882)
- October 16 – Michalis Souyioul, Greek composer (b. 1906)
- October 17 – Zheng Zhenduo, Chinese historian and translator (b. 1898)
- October 24
  - G. E. Moore, British philosopher of (Principia Ethica) (b. 1873)
  - Martin Shaw, English composer and conductor (b. 1875)
- October 29 – Zoë Akins, American playwright, poet and author (b. 1886)

=== November ===
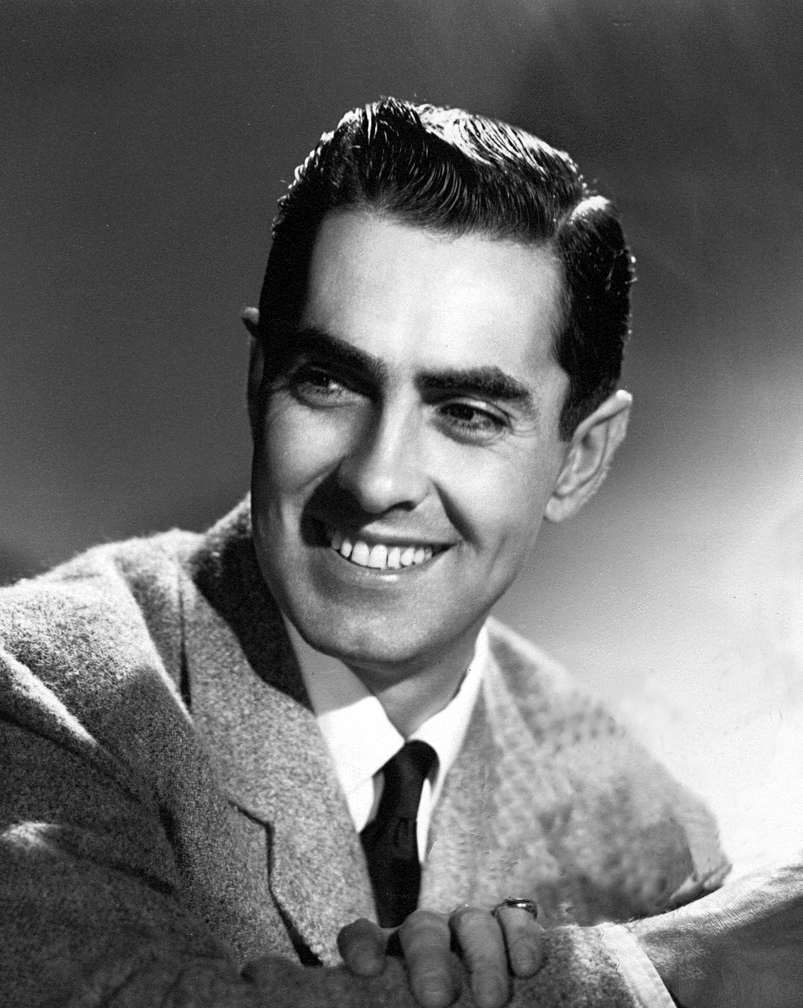
Tyrone Power

- November 4
  - Hermann von Kuhl, German general (b. 1856)
  - Sam Zimbalist, American film producer (b. 1904)
- November 9 – Dorothy Canfield Fisher, American author and activist (b. 1879)
- November 11 – André Bazin, French film critic and theorist (b. 1918)
- November 15 – Tyrone Power, American actor (b. 1914)
- November 19
  - Vittorio Ambrosio, Italian general (b. 1879)
  - Hans Heinrich von Twardowski, German actor (b. 1898)
- November 24 – Robert Cecil, 1st Viscount Cecil of Chelwood, English politician and diplomat, recipient of the Nobel Peace Prize (b. 1864)
- November 27
  - Artur Rodziński, Polish conductor (b. 1892)
  - Georgi Damyanov, Bulgarian Communist political, Chairman of the Presidium of the National Assembly and head of the State (b. 1892)
- November 30 – Sir Hubert Wilkins, Australian explorer (b. 1888)

=== December ===
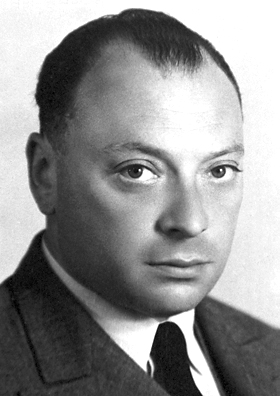
Wolfgang Pauli

- December 1 – Elizabeth Peratrovich, American civil rights activist (born 1911)
- December 4 – José María Caro Rodríguez, Chilean Roman Catholic cardinal (born 1866)
- December 5
  - Willie Applegarth, British track and field athlete (b. 1890)
  - Patras Bokhari, Pakistani humorist (b. 1898)
- December 8 – Tris Speaker, American baseball player (b. 1888)
- December 12
  - Slobodan Jovanović, Serbian intellectual and politician (b. 1869)
  - Milutin Milanković, Yugoslav mathematician, astronomer, climatologist and geophysicist, (b. 1879)
- December 13
  - Grand Duchess Maria Pavlovna of Russia (b.1890)
  - Tim Moore, American vaudevillian and comic actor (b. 1887)
- December 15 – Wolfgang Pauli, Austrian-born American physicist, Nobel Prize laureate (b. 1900)
- December 21
  - Lion Feuchtwanger, German novelist and playwright (b. 1884)
  - H. B. Warner, English actor (b. 1876)
- December 23 – Dorothy Macardle, Irish writer and historian (b. 1889)
- December 27 – Mustafa Merlika-Kruja, 16th Prime Minister of Albania (b. 1887)
- December 29 – Doris Humphrey, American dancer and choreographer (b. 1895)

== Nobel Prizes ==

- Physics – Pavel Cherenkov, Ilya Frank and Igor Tamm
- Chemistry – Frederick Sanger
- Physiology or Medicine – George Beadle, Edward Tatum and Joshua Lederberg
- Literature: Boris Pasternak
- Peace – Georges Pire
