= 1952–53 Manchester United F.C. season =

English football club season

Manchester United
1952–53 season
- Chairman: Harold Hardman
- Manager: Matt Busby
- First Division: 8th
- FA Cup: Fifth Round
- FA Charity Shield: Winners
- Top goalscorer: League: Stan Pearson (16); All: Stan Pearson (18)
- Highest home attendance: 52,590 vs Preston North End (7 March 1953)
- Lowest home attendance: 11,381 vs Newcastle United (24 September 1952)
- Average home league attendance: 34,794
Home colours	Away colours

The 1952–53 season was Manchester United's 51st season in the Football League, and their eighth consecutive season in the top division of English football.

The regeneration of squad continued as younger players continued to take the place of the players who had been in the 1948 FA Cup winning team and the previous season's title campaign. Making their senior debuts this season were teenagers Duncan Edwards, a half-back from Dudley, and Doncaster-born winger David Pegg. Also joining the ranks was 21-year-old centre-forward Tommy Taylor from Barnsley for a club record fee of £29,999 in April 1953, a month before Edwards made his debut.

== FA Charity Shield ==
Date	Opponents	H / A	Result F–A	Scorers	Attendance
24 September 1952	Newcastle United	H	4–2	Rowley (2), Byrne, Downie	11,381

== First Division ==
Date	Opponents	H / A	Result F–A	Scorers	Attendance	League position
23 August 1952	Chelsea	H	2–0	Berry, Downie	43,629	3rd
27 August 1952	Arsenal	A	1–2	Rowley	58,831	8th
30 August 1952	Manchester City	A	1–2	Downie	56,140	14th
3 September 1952	Arsenal	H	0–0		39,193	13th
6 September 1952	Portsmouth	A	0–2		37,278	19th
10 September 1952	Derby County	A	3–2	Pearson (3)	20,226	13th
13 September 1952	Bolton Wanderers	H	1–0	Berry	40,531	11th
20 September 1952	Aston Villa	A	3–3	Rowley (2), Downie	43,490	12th
27 September 1952	Sunderland	H	0–1		28,967	15th
4 October 1952	Wolverhampton Wanderers	A	2–6	Rowley (2)	40,132	17th
11 October 1952	Stoke City	H	0–2		28,968	21st
18 October 1952	Preston North End	A	5–0	Aston (2), Pearson (2), Rowley	33,502	17th
25 October 1952	Burnley	H	1–3	Aston	36,913	19th
1 November 1952	Tottenham Hotspur	A	2–1	Berry (2)	44,300	18th
8 November 1952	Sheffield Wednesday	H	1–1	Pearson	48,571	19th
15 November 1952	Cardiff City	A	2–1	Aston, Pearson	40,096	15th
22 November 1952	Newcastle United	H	2–2	Aston, Pearson	33,528	15th
29 November 1952	West Bromwich Albion	A	1–3	Lewis	23,499	16th
6 December 1952	Middlesbrough	H	3–2	Pearson (2), Aston	27,617	15th
13 December 1952	Liverpool	A	2–1	Aston, Pearson	34,450	11th
20 December 1952	Chelsea	A	3–2	Doherty (2), Aston	23,261	8th
25 December 1952	Blackpool	A	0–0		27,778	9th
26 December 1952	Blackpool	H	2–1	Carey, Lewis	48,077	8th
1 January 1953	Derby County	H	1–0	Lewis	34,813	8th
3 January 1953	Manchester City	H	1–1	Pearson	47,883	7th
17 January 1953	Portsmouth	H	1–0	Lewis	32,341	6th
24 January 1953	Bolton Wanderers	A	1–2	Lewis	43,638	7th
7 February 1953	Aston Villa	H	3–1	Rowley (2), Lewis	34,339	7th
18 February 1953	Sunderland	A	2–2	Lewis, Pegg	24,263	7th
21 February 1953	Wolverhampton Wanderers	H	0–3		38,269	8th
28 February 1953	Stoke City	A	1–3	Berry	30,219	9th
7 March 1953	Preston North End	H	5–2	Pegg (2), Taylor (2), Rowley	52,590	9th
14 March 1953	Burnley	A	1–2	Byrne	45,682	9th
25 March 1953	Tottenham Hotspur	H	3–2	Pearson (2), Pegg	18,384	8th
28 March 1953	Sheffield Wednesday	A	0–0		36,509	8th
3 April 1953	Charlton Athletic	A	2–2	Berry, Taylor	41,814	8th
4 April 1953	Cardiff City	H	1–4	Byrne	37,163	8th
6 April 1953	Charlton Athletic	H	3–2	Taylor (2), Rowley	30,105	8th
11 April 1953	Newcastle United	A	2–1	Taylor (2)	38,970	8th
18 April 1953	West Bromwich Albion	H	2–2	Pearson, Viollet	31,380	8th
20 April 1953	Liverpool	H	3–1	Berry, Pearson, Rowley	20,869	7th
25 April 1953	Middlesbrough	A	0–5		34,344	8th

Pos	Team	Pld	W	D	L	GF	GA	GAv	Pts	Relegation
1	Arsenal (C)	42	21	12	9	97	64	1.516	54	
2	Preston North End	42	21	12	9	85	60	1.417	54	
3	Wolverhampton Wanderers	42	19	13	10	86	63	1.365	51	
4	West Bromwich Albion	42	21	8	13	66	60	1.100	50	
5	Charlton Athletic	42	19	11	12	77	63	1.222	49	
6	Burnley	42	18	12	12	67	52	1.288	48	
7	Blackpool	42	19	9	14	71	70	1.014	47	
8	Manchester United	42	18	10	14	69	72	0.958	46	
9	Sunderland	42	15	13	14	68	82	0.829	43	
10	Tottenham Hotspur	42	15	11	16	78	69	1.130	41	
11	Aston Villa	42	14	13	15	63	61	1.033	41	
12	Cardiff City	42	14	12	16	54	46	1.174	40	
13	Middlesbrough	42	14	11	17	70	77	0.909	39	
14	Bolton Wanderers	42	15	9	18	61	69	0.884	39	
15	Portsmouth	42	14	10	18	74	83	0.892	38	
16	Newcastle United	42	14	9	19	59	70	0.843	37	
17	Liverpool	42	14	8	20	61	82	0.744	36	
18	Sheffield Wednesday	42	12	11	19	62	72	0.861	35	
19	Chelsea	42	12	11	19	56	66	0.848	35	
20	Manchester City	42	14	7	21	72	87	0.828	35	
21	Stoke City (R)	42	12	10	20	53	66	0.803	34	Relegation to the Second Division
22	Derby County (R)	42	11	10	21	59	74	0.797	32	Relegation to the Second Division

Source: World Football
Rules for classification: 1) Points; 2) Goal average; 3) Goals scored
(C) Champions; (R) Relegated

== FA Cup ==
Date	Round	Opponents	H / A	Result F–A	Scorers	Attendance
10 January 1953	Round 3	Millwall	A	1–0	Pearson	35,652
31 January 1953	Round 4	Walthamstow Avenue	H	1–1	Lewis	34,748
5 February 1953	Round 4 Replay	Walthamstow Avenue	A	5–2	Rowley (2), Byrne, Lewis, Pearson	49,119
14 February 1953	Round 5	Everton	A	1–2	Rowley	77,920

== Squad statistics ==
Pos.	Name	League		FA Cup		Charity Shield		Total	
Pos.	Name	Apps	Goals	Apps	Goals	Apps	Goals	Apps	Goals
GK	(England) Reg Allen	2	0	0	0	0	0	2	0
GK	(England) Jack Crompton	25	0	0	0	0	0	25	0
GK	(England) Les Olive	2	0	0	0	0	0	2	0
GK	(England) Ray Wood	12	0	4	0	1	0	17	0
FB	(England) John Aston, Sr.	40	8	4	0	1	0	45	8
FB	(England) Roger Byrne	40	2	4	1	1	1	45	4
FB	(Republic of Ireland) Johnny Carey	32	1	4	0	1	0	37	1
FB	(England) Bill Foulkes	2	0	0	0	0	0	2	0
FB	(England) Mark Jones	2	0	0	0	0	0	2	0
FB	(England) Tommy McNulty	23	0	0	0	1	0	24	0
FB	(England) Billy Redman	1	0	0	0	0	0	1	0
HB	(Northern Ireland) Jackie Blanchflower	1	0	0	0	0	0	1	0
HB	(England) Allenby Chilton	42	0	4	0	1	0	47	0
HB	(England) Henry Cockburn	22	0	4	0	0	0	26	0
HB	(England) Duncan Edwards	1	0	0	0	0	0	1	0
HB	(England) Don Gibson	20	0	0	0	1	0	21	0
HB	(England) Jeff Whitefoot	10	0	0	0	0	0	10	0
FW	(England) Johnny Berry	40	7	4	0	1	0	45	7
FW	(England) Ernie Bond	1	0	0	0	0	0	1	0
FW	(England) Frank Clempson	4	0	0	0	0	0	4	0
FW	(England) John Doherty	5	2	0	0	0	0	5	2
FW	(Scotland) Johnny Downie	20	3	2	0	1	1	23	4
FW	(England) Eddie Lewis	10	7	4	2	0	0	14	9
FW	(Scotland) Harry McShane	5	0	0	0	0	0	5	0
FW	(England) Stan Pearson	39	16	4	2	1	0	44	18
FW	(England) David Pegg	19	4	2	0	0	0	21	4
FW	(England) Jack Rowley	26	11	4	3	1	2	31	16
FW	(Northern Ireland) Jackie Scott	2	0	0	0	0	0	2	0
FW	(England) Tommy Taylor	11	7	0	0	0	0	11	7
FW	(England) Dennis Viollet	3	1	0	0	0	0	3	1
