= 1951–52 Manchester United F.C. season =

English football club season

Manchester United
1951–52 season
- Chairman: James W. Gibson (until September 1951); Harold Hardman (from September 1951)
- Manager: Matt Busby
- First Division: 1st
- FA Cup: Third Round
- Top goalscorer: League: Jack Rowley (30); All: Jack Rowley (30)
- Highest home attendance: 54,245 vs Manchester City (19 January 1952)
- Lowest home attendance: 25,616 vs Huddersfield Town (3 November 1951)
- Average home league attendance: 41,374
Home colours	Away colours

The 1951–52 season was Manchester United's 50th season in the Football League, and their seventh consecutive season in the top division of English football. They finished the season as champions for the first time in 41 years, securing their title on the final day of the season with a 6–1 home win over an Arsenal side who were their last remaining contenders in the race for the title.

United were still captained by Johnny Carey, who along with the likes of high scoring forward Jack Rowley had been at the club since before the war and helped them win the FA Cup in 1948, but by this stage most of the players from United's first postwar side were now in their thirties, and Busby was gradually replacing his older stars with younger players from the youth team. He made a club record move for Birmingham City winger Johnny Berry before the start of this title winning season, and also drafted in 22-year-old Roger Byrne from the reserve side to occupy the left wing, with Byrne scoring a host of crucial goals to help United clinch the title. Another young player who made his debut in the season, but did not play enough times to collect a championship medal, was the Belfast born teenager Jackie Blanchflower, who was equally capable as a half-back or inside-forward.

== Friendlies ==
Date	Opponents	H / A	Result F–A	Scorers	Attendance
26 September 1951	Hapoel	H	6–0	Rowley (2), Pearson (2), Walton, Aston	12,000
23 February 1952	Manchester City	H	4–2	Pearson (2), Aston, Clempson	25,002
29 March 1952	Hibernian	H	1–1	Clempson	20,098
9 May 1952	New Jersey XI	N	4–0	Byrne (2), Berry, Carey	9,000
11 May 1952	Philadelphia All-Stars	N	4–0	Rowley (2), Clempson, Byrne	5,000
13 May 1952	Montreal All-Stars	N	10–0	Rowley (3), Downie (3), Clempson (3), McShane	6,400
18 May 1952	American League XI	N	5–1	Clempson (2), Berry, Rowley, Downie	7,150
21 May 1952	Fall River All-Stars	N	11–1	Rowley (7), Downie (3), Martin (o.g.)	3,102
25 May 1952	Stuttgart	N	5–2	Byrne, Clempson, Downie/Rowley, Downie/Byrne, Rowley	5,874
27 May 1952	Chicago All-Stars	N	6–1	Rowley (3), Downie (2), Aston	3,564
1 June 1952	Atlas	N	2–0	Pearson, Byrne (pen.)	
8 June 1952	Atlas	N	4–3	Pearson (3), Byrne	12,000
12 June 1952	Toronto Ulster United	N	4–2	Clempson, Aston, Downie, Pearson	10,000
14 June 1952	Tottenham Hotspur	N	0–1		25,321
15 June 1952	Tottenham Hotspur	N	1–2	Rowley	24,582

== First Division ==
Date	Opponents	H / A	Result F–A	Scorers	Attendance
18 August 1951	West Bromwich Albion	A	3–3	Rowley (3)	27,486
22 August 1951	Middlesbrough	H	4–2	Rowley (3), Pearson	37,339
25 August 1951	Newcastle United	H	2–1	Downie, Rowley	51,850
29 August 1951	Middlesbrough	A	4–1	Pearson (2), Rowley (2)	44,212
1 September 1951	Bolton Wanderers	A	0–1		52,239
5 September 1951	Charlton Athletic	H	3–2	Rowley (2), Downie	26,773
8 September 1951	Stoke City	H	4–0	Rowley (3), Pearson	48,660
12 September 1951	Charlton Athletic	A	2–2	Downie (2)	28,806
15 September 1951	Manchester City	A	2–1	Berry, McShane	52,571
22 September 1951	Tottenham Hotspur	A	0–2		70,882
29 September 1951	Preston North End	H	1–2	Aston	53,454
6 October 1951	Derby County	H	2–1	Berry, Pearson	39,767
13 October 1951	Aston Villa	A	5–2	Pearson (2), Rowley (2), Bond	47,795
20 October 1951	Sunderland	H	0–1		40,915
27 October 1951	Wolverhampton Wanderers	A	2–0	Pearson, Rowley	46,167
3 November 1951	Huddersfield Town	H	1–1	Pearson	25,616
10 November 1951	Chelsea	A	2–4	Pearson, Rowley	48,960
17 November 1951	Portsmouth	H	1–3	Downie	35,914
24 November 1951	Liverpool	A	0–0		42,378
1 December 1951	Blackpool	H	3–1	Downie (2), Rowley	34,154
8 December 1951	Arsenal	A	3–1	Pearson, Rowley, own goal	55,451
15 December 1951	West Bromwich Albion	H	5–1	Downie (2), Pearson (2), Berry	27,584
22 December 1951	Newcastle United	A	2–2	Bond, Cockburn	45,414
25 December 1951	Fulham	H	3–2	Berry, Bond, Rowley	33,802
26 December 1951	Fulham	A	3–3	Bond, Pearson, Rowley	32,671
29 December 1951	Bolton Wanderers	H	1–0	Pearson	53,205
5 January 1952	Stoke City	A	0–0		36,389
19 January 1952	Manchester City	H	1–1	Carey	54,245
26 January 1952	Tottenham Hotspur	H	2–0	Pearson, own goal	40,845
9 February 1952	Preston North End	A	2–1	Aston, Berry	38,792
16 February 1952	Derby County	A	3–0	Aston, Pearson, Rowley	27,693
1 March 1952	Aston Villa	H	1–1	Berry	38,910
8 March 1952	Sunderland	A	2–1	Cockburn, Rowley	48,078
15 March 1952	Wolverhampton Wanderers	H	2–0	Aston, Clempson	45,109
22 March 1952	Huddersfield Town	A	2–3	Clempson, Pearson	30,316
5 April 1952	Portsmouth	A	0–1		25,522
11 April 1952	Burnley	A	1–1	Byrne	38,907
12 April 1952	Liverpool	H	4–0	Byrne (2), Downie, Rowley	42,970
14 April 1952	Burnley	H	6–1	Byrne (2), Carey, Downie, Pearson, Rowley	44,508
19 April 1952	Blackpool	A	2–2	Byrne, Rowley	29,118
21 April 1952	Chelsea	H	3–0	Carey, Pearson, own goal	37,436
26 April 1952	Arsenal	H	6–1	Rowley (3), Pearson (2), Byrne	53,651

Pos	Team	Pld	W	D	L	GF	GA	GAv	Pts
1	Manchester United (C)	42	23	11	8	95	52	1.827	57
2	Tottenham Hotspur	42	22	9	11	76	51	1.490	53
3	Arsenal	42	21	11	10	80	61	1.311	53
4	Portsmouth	42	20	8	14	68	58	1.172	48
5	Bolton Wanderers	42	19	10	13	65	61	1.066	48

Source: World Football
Rules for classification: 1) Points; 2) Goal average; 3) Goals scored
(C) Champions

== FA Cup ==
Date	Round	Opponents	H / A	Result F–A	Scorers	Attendance
12 January 1952	Round 3	Hull City	A	0–2		43,517

== Squad statistics ==
Pos.	Name	League		FA Cup		Total	
Pos.	Name	Apps	Goals	Apps	Goals	Apps	Goals
GK	(England) Reg Allen	33	0	1	0	34	0
GK	(England) Jack Crompton	9	0	0	0	9	0
FB	(England) Roger Byrne	24	7	1	0	25	7
FB	(Republic of Ireland) Johnny Carey	38	3	1	0	39	3
FB	(England) Thomas McNulty	24	0	1	0	25	0
FB	(England) Billy Redman	18	0	0	0	18	0
HB	(Northern Ireland) Jackie Blanchflower	1	0	0	0	1	0
HB	(England) Allenby Chilton	42	0	1	0	43	0
HB	(England) Henry Cockburn	38	2	1	0	39	2
HB	(England) Don Gibson	17	0	0	0	17	0
HB	(England) Mark Jones	3	0	0	0	3	0
HB	(England) Billy McGlen	2	0	0	0	2	0
HB	(England) Jeff Whitefoot	3	0	0	0	3	0
FW	(England) John Aston, Sr.	18	4	0	0	18	4
FW	(England) Johnny Berry	36	6	1	0	37	6
FW	(England) Brian Birch	2	0	0	0	2	0
FW	(England) Ernie Bond	19	4	1	0	20	4
FW	(England) Laurie Cassidy	1	0	0	0	1	0
FW	(England) Frank Clempson	8	2	0	0	8	2
FW	(Scotland) John Downie	31	11	1	0	32	11
FW	(Scotland) Harry McShane	12	1	0	0	12	1
FW	(England) Stan Pearson	41	22	1	0	42	22
FW	(England) Jack Rowley	40	30	1	0	41	30
FW	(England) John Walton	2	0	0	0	2	0
