= 1953–54 Manchester United F.C. season =

English football club season

Manchester United
1953–54 season
- Chairman: Harold Hardman
- Manager: Matt Busby
- First Division: 4th
- FA Cup: Third Round
- Top goalscorer: League: Tommy Taylor (22); All: Tommy Taylor (23)
- Highest home attendance: 49,853 vs Blackpool (21 November 1953)
- Lowest home attendance: 18,161 vs Middlesbrough (9 September 1953)
- Average home league attendance: 33,590
Home colours	Away colours

The 1953–54 season was Manchester United's 52nd season in the Football League, and their ninth consecutive season in the top division of English football.

United finished the season in fourth place, recovering well after an eight-match winless start. Top scorer for the season was Tommy Taylor, who in his first full season at the club scored 22 goals in the league and a further goal in the FA Cup. 20-year-old striker Dennis Viollet established himself in the first team this season and scored 12 goals, and 17-year-old Duncan Edwards gradually displaced the veteran Henry Cockburn at left-half.

== First Division ==
Date	Opponents	H / A	Result F–A	Scorers	Attendance
19 August 1953	Chelsea	H	1–1	Pearson	28,936
22 August 1953	Liverpool	A	4–4	Byrne, Lewis, Rowley, Taylor	48,422
26 August 1953	West Bromwich Albion	H	1–3	Taylor	31,806
29 August 1953	Newcastle United	H	1–1	Chilton	27,837
2 September 1953	West Bromwich Albion	A	0–2		28,892
5 September 1953	Manchester City	A	0–2		53,097
9 September 1953	Middlesbrough	H	2–2	Rowley (2)	18,161
12 September 1953	Bolton Wanderers	A	0–0		43,544
16 September 1953	Middlesbrough	A	4–1	Taylor (2), Byrne, Rowley	23,607
19 September 1953	Preston North End	H	1–0	Byrne	41,171
26 September 1953	Tottenham Hotspur	A	1–1	Rowley	52,837
3 October 1953	Burnley	H	1–2	Pearson	37,696
10 October 1953	Sunderland	H	1–0	Rowley	34,617
17 October 1953	Wolverhampton Wanderers	A	1–3	Taylor	40,084
24 October 1953	Aston Villa	H	1–0	Berry	30,266
31 October 1953	Huddersfield Town	A	0–0		34,175
7 November 1953	Arsenal	H	2–2	Blanchflower, Rowley	28,141
14 November 1953	Cardiff City	A	6–1	Viollet (2), Berry, Blanchflower, Rowley, Taylor	26,844
21 November 1953	Blackpool	H	4–1	Taylor (3), Viollet	49,853
28 November 1953	Portsmouth	A	1–1	Taylor	29,233
5 December 1953	Sheffield United	H	2–2	Blanchflower (2)	31,693
12 December 1953	Chelsea	A	1–3	Berry	37,153
19 December 1953	Liverpool	H	5–1	Blanchflower (2), Taylor (2), Viollet	26,074
25 December 1953	Sheffield Wednesday	H	5–2	Taylor (3), Blanchflower, Viollet	27,123
26 December 1953	Sheffield Wednesday	A	1–0	Viollet	44,196
2 January 1954	Newcastle United	A	2–1	Blanchflower, Foulkes	55,780
16 January 1954	Manchester City	H	1–1	Berry	46,379
23 January 1954	Bolton Wanderers	H	1–5	Taylor	46,663
6 February 1954	Preston North End	A	3–1	Blanchflower, Rowley, Taylor	30,064
13 February 1954	Tottenham Hotspur	H	2–0	Rowley, Taylor	35,485
20 February 1954	Burnley	A	0–2		29,576
27 February 1954	Sunderland	A	2–0	Taylor, Blanchflower	58,440
6 March 1954	Wolverhampton Wanderers	H	1–0	Berry	38,939
13 March 1954	Aston Villa	A	2–2	Taylor (2)	26,023
20 March 1954	Huddersfield Town	H	3–1	Blanchflower, Rowley, Viollet	40,181
27 March 1954	Arsenal	A	1–3	Taylor	42,753
3 April 1954	Cardiff City	H	2–3	Rowley, Viollet	22,832
10 April 1954	Blackpool	A	0–2		25,996
16 April 1954	Charlton Athletic	H	2–0	Aston, Viollet	31,876
17 April 1954	Portsmouth	H	2–0	Blanchflower, Viollet	29,663
19 April 1954	Charlton Athletic	A	0–1		19,111
24 April 1954	Sheffield United	A	3–1	Aston, Blanchflower, Viollet	29,189

Pos	Team	Pld	W	D	L	GF	GA	GAv	Pts	Relegation
1	Wolverhampton Wanderers (C)	42	25	7	10	96	56	1.714	57	
2	West Bromwich Albion	42	22	9	11	86	63	1.365	53	
3	Huddersfield Town	42	20	11	11	78	61	1.279	51	
4	Manchester United	42	18	12	12	73	58	1.259	48	
5	Bolton Wanderers	42	18	12	12	75	60	1.250	48	
6	Blackpool	42	19	10	13	80	69	1.159	48	
7	Burnley	42	21	4	17	78	67	1.164	46	
8	Chelsea	42	16	12	14	74	68	1.088	44	
9	Charlton Athletic	42	19	6	17	75	77	0.974	44	
10	Cardiff City	42	18	8	16	51	71	0.718	44	
11	Preston North End	42	19	5	18	87	58	1.500	43	
12	Arsenal	42	15	13	14	75	73	1.027	43	
13	Aston Villa	42	16	9	17	70	68	1.029	41	
14	Portsmouth	42	14	11	17	81	89	0.910	39	
15	Newcastle United	42	14	10	18	72	77	0.935	38	
16	Tottenham Hotspur	42	16	5	21	65	76	0.855	37	
17	Manchester City	42	14	9	19	62	77	0.805	37	
18	Sunderland	42	14	8	20	81	89	0.910	36	
19	Sheffield Wednesday	42	15	6	21	70	91	0.769	36	
20	Sheffield United	42	11	11	20	69	90	0.767	33	
21	Middlesbrough (R)	42	10	10	22	60	91	0.659	30	Relegation to the Second Division
22	Liverpool (R)	42	9	10	23	68	97	0.701	28	Relegation to the Second Division

Source: World Football
Rules for classification: 1) Points; 2) Goal average; 3) Goals scored
(C) Champions; (R) Relegated

== FA Cup ==
Date	Round	Opponents	H / A	Result F–A	Scorers	Attendance
19 January 1954	Round 3	Burnley	A	3–5	Blanchflower, Taylor, Viollet	54,000

== Squad statistics ==
Pos.	Name	League		FA Cup		Total	
Pos.	Name	Apps	Goals	Apps	Goals	Apps	Goals
GK	(England) Jack Crompton	15	0	0	0	15	0
GK	(England) Ray Wood	27	0	1	0	28	0
FB	(England) John Aston, Sr.	12	2	0	0	12	2
FB	(England) Roger Byrne	41	3	1	0	41	3
FB	(England) Bill Foulkes	32	1	1	0	33	1
FB	(England) Tommy McNulty	4	0	0	0	4	0
FB	(England) Billy Redman	1	0	0	0	1	0
HB	(Northern Ireland) Jackie Blanchflower	27	13	1	1	28	14
HB	(England) Allenby Chilton	42	1	1	0	43	1
HB	(England) Henry Cockburn	18	0	0	0	18	0
HB	(England) Duncan Edwards	24	0	1	0	25	0
HB	(England) Don Gibson	7	0	0	0	7	0
HB	(England) Jeff Whitefoot	38	0	1	0	39	0
FW	(England) Johnny Berry	37	5	1	0	38	5
FW	(England) Eddie Lewis	6	1	0	0	6	1
FW	(Republic of Ireland) Noel McFarlane	1	0	0	0	1	0
FW	(England) David Pegg	9	0	0	0	9	0
FW	(England) Stan Pearson	11	2	0	0	11	2
FW	(Scotland) Harry McShane	9	0	0	0	9	0
FW	(England) Jack Rowley	36	12	1	0	37	12
FW	(England) Tommy Taylor	35	22	1	1	36	23
FW	(England) Dennis Viollet	29	11	1	1	30	12
FW	(Wales) Colin Webster	1	0	0	0	1	0
