= 1952 FA Charity Shield =

- Event: FA Charity Shield
Manchester United	Newcastle United
4	2
- Date: 24 September 1952
- Venue: Old Trafford, Manchester
- Attendance: 11,381

The 1952 FA Charity Shield was the 30th FA Charity Shield, an annual football match held between the winners of the previous season's Football League and FA Cup competitions. The match was contested by Manchester United, who had won the 1951–52 Football League, and Newcastle United, who had won the 1951–52 FA Cup, at Old Trafford, Manchester, on 24 September 1952. Manchester United came back from a goal down at half-time to win the match 4–2. Their goals were scored by Jack Rowley (2), Roger Byrne and John Downie, while Vic Keeble scored both goals for Newcastle.

== Match details ==
24 September 1952

Manchester United	4–2	Newcastle United
Rowley 28', 53'; Byrne 63'; Downie 75'		Keeble 35', 69'

Old Trafford, Manchester
Attendance: 11,381

GK	1	(England) Ray Wood
RB	2	(England) Thomas McNulty
LB	3	(England) John Aston
RH	4	(Republic of Ireland) Johnny Carey (c)
CH	5	(England) Allenby Chilton
LH	6	(England) Don Gibson
OR	7	(England) Johnny Berry
IR	8	(Scotland) John Downie
CF	9	(England) Jack Rowley
IL	10	(England) Stan Pearson
OL	11	(England) Roger Byrne
Manager:
(Scotland) Matt Busby

GK	1	(Scotland) Ronnie Simpson
RB	2	(England) Bobby Cowell
LB	3	(England) Ron Batty
RH	4	(Chile) Ted Robledo
CH	5	(England) Bob Stokoe (c)
LH	6	(Northern Ireland) Tommy Casey
OR	7	(England) Tommy Walker
IR	8	(Chile) George Robledo
CF	9	(England) Vic Keeble
IL	10	(England) Neville Black
OL	11	(Scotland) Bobby Mitchell
Manager:
(England) Stan Seymour

== See also ==
- 1951–52 Football League
- 1951–52 FA Cup
