= 1954–55 Manchester United F.C. season =

English football club season

Manchester United
1954–55 season
- Chairman: Harold Hardman
- Manager: Matt Busby
- First Division: 5th
- FA Cup: Fourth Round
- Top goalscorer: League: Dennis Viollet (20); Tommy Taylor (20); All: Dennis Viollet (21)
- Highest home attendance: 51,918 vs Blackpool (1 January 1955)
- Lowest home attendance: 15,679 vs Wolverhampton Wanderers (23 February 1955)
- Average home league attendance: 33,815
| Home colours | Away colours |

The 1954–55 season was Manchester United's 53rd season in the Football League, and their tenth consecutive season in the top division of English football. United finished fifth in the league. Their top scorer was Dennis Viollet, with 21 goals. Departing the club at the end of the season was veteran forward Jack Rowley after 18 years at Old Trafford. With younger players continuing to form the mainstay of the side, several more made their debuts this season, including Dublin born forward Billy Whelan who made his senior debut just before his 20th birthday.

== First Division ==
| Date | Opponents | H / A | Result F–A | Scorers | Attendance |
|---|---|---|---|---|---|
| 21 August 1954 | Portsmouth | H | 1–3 | Rowley | 38,203 |
| 23 August 1954 | Sheffield Wednesday | A | 4–2 | Blanchflower (2), Viollet (2) | 38,118 |
| 28 August 1954 | Blackpool | A | 4–2 | Webster (2), Blanchflower, Viollet | 31,855 |
| 1 September 1954 | Sheffield Wednesday | H | 2–0 | Viollet (2) | 31,371 |
| 4 September 1954 | Charlton Athletic | H | 3–1 | Rowley (2), Taylor | 38,105 |
| 8 September 1954 | Tottenham Hotspur | A | 2–0 | Berry, Webster | 35,162 |
| 11 September 1954 | Bolton Wanderers | A | 1–1 | Webster | 44,661 |
| 15 September 1954 | Tottenham Hotspur | H | 2–1 | Rowley, Viollet | 29,212 |
| 18 September 1954 | Huddersfield Town | H | 1–1 | Viollet | 45,648 |
| 25 September 1954 | Manchester City | A | 2–3 | Blanchflower, Taylor | 54,105 |
| 2 October 1954 | Wolverhampton Wanderers | A | 2–4 | Rowley, Viollet | 39,617 |
| 9 October 1954 | Cardiff City | H | 5–2 | Taylor (4), Viollet | 39,378 |
| 16 October 1954 | Chelsea | A | 6–5 | Viollet (3), Taylor (2), Blanchflower | 55,966 |
| 23 October 1954 | Newcastle United | H | 2–2 | Taylor, own goal | 29,217 |
| 30 October 1954 | Everton | A | 2–4 | Taylor, Rowley | 63,021 |
| 6 November 1954 | Preston North End | H | 2–1 | Viollet (2) | 30,063 |
| 13 November 1954 | Sheffield United | A | 0–3 | | 26,257 |
| 20 November 1954 | Arsenal | H | 2–1 | Blanchflower, Taylor | 33,373 |
| 27 November 1954 | West Bromwich Albion | A | 0–2 | | 33,931 |
| 4 December 1954 | Leicester City | H | 3–1 | Webster, Rowley, Viollet | 19,369 |
| 11 December 1954 | Burnley | A | 4–2 | Webster (3), Viollet | 24,977 |
| 18 December 1954 | Portsmouth | A | 0–0 | | 26,019 |
| 27 December 1954 | Aston Villa | H | 0–1 | | 49,136 |
| 28 December 1954 | Aston Villa | A | 1–2 | Taylor | 48,718 |
| 1 January 1955 | Blackpool | H | 4–1 | Blanchflower (2), Edwards, Viollet | 51,918 |
| 22 January 1955 | Bolton Wanderers | H | 1–1 | Taylor | 39,873 |
| 5 February 1955 | Huddersfield Town | A | 3–1 | Berry, Edwards, Pegg | 31,408 |
| 12 February 1955 | Manchester City | H | 0–5 | | 47,914 |
| 23 February 1955 | Wolverhampton Wanderers | H | 2–4 | Edwards, Taylor | 15,679 |
| 26 February 1955 | Cardiff City | A | 0–3 | | 16,329 |
| 5 March 1955 | Burnley | H | 1–0 | Edwards | 31,729 |
| 19 March 1955 | Everton | H | 1–2 | Scanlon | 32,295 |
| 26 March 1955 | Preston North End | A | 2–0 | Byrne, Scanlon | 13,327 |
| 2 April 1955 | Sheffield United | H | 5–0 | Taylor (2), Berry, Viollet, Whelan | 21,158 |
| 8 April 1955 | Sunderland | A | 3–4 | Edwards (2), Scanlon | 43,882 |
| 9 April 1955 | Leicester City | A | 0–1 | | 34,362 |
| 11 April 1955 | Sunderland | H | 2–2 | Byrne, Taylor | 36,013 |
| 16 April 1955 | West Bromwich Albion | H | 3–0 | Taylor (2), Viollet | 24,765 |
| 18 April 1955 | Newcastle United | A | 0–2 | | 35,540 |
| 23 April 1955 | Arsenal | A | 3–2 | Blanchflower (2), own goal | 42,754 |
| 26 April 1955 | Charlton Athletic | A | 1–1 | Viollet | 13,149 |
| 30 April 1955 | Chelsea | H | 2–1 | Scanlon, Taylor | 34,933 |

| Pos | Team | Pld | W | D | L | GF | GA | GAv | Pts | Qualification or relegation |
|---|---|---|---|---|---|---|---|---|---|---|
| 1 | Chelsea (C) | 42 | 20 | 12 | 10 | 81 | 57 | 1.421 | 52 | Denied entry to the European Cup (Note: Chelsea were invited to play at the inaugural European Cup but were barred from participation by The FA.) |
| 2 | Wolverhampton Wanderers | 42 | 19 | 10 | 13 | 89 | 70 | 1.271 | 48 | |
| 3 | Portsmouth | 42 | 18 | 12 | 12 | 74 | 62 | 1.194 | 48 | |
| 4 | Sunderland | 42 | 15 | 18 | 9 | 64 | 54 | 1.185 | 48 | |
| 5 | Manchester United | 42 | 20 | 7 | 15 | 84 | 74 | 1.135 | 47 | |
| 6 | Aston Villa | 42 | 20 | 7 | 15 | 72 | 73 | 0.986 | 47 | |
| 7 | Manchester City | 42 | 18 | 10 | 14 | 76 | 69 | 1.101 | 46 | |
| 8 | Newcastle United | 42 | 17 | 9 | 16 | 89 | 77 | 1.156 | 43 | |
| 9 | Arsenal | 42 | 17 | 9 | 16 | 69 | 63 | 1.095 | 43 | |
| 10 | Burnley | 42 | 17 | 9 | 16 | 51 | 48 | 1.063 | 43 | |
| 11 | Everton | 42 | 16 | 10 | 16 | 62 | 68 | 0.912 | 42 | |
| 12 | Huddersfield Town | 42 | 14 | 13 | 15 | 63 | 68 | 0.926 | 41 | |
| 13 | Sheffield United | 42 | 17 | 7 | 18 | 70 | 86 | 0.814 | 41 | |
| 14 | Preston North End | 42 | 16 | 8 | 18 | 83 | 64 | 1.297 | 40 | |
| 15 | Charlton Athletic | 42 | 15 | 10 | 17 | 76 | 75 | 1.013 | 40 | |
| 16 | Tottenham Hotspur | 42 | 16 | 8 | 18 | 72 | 73 | 0.986 | 40 | |
| 17 | West Bromwich Albion | 42 | 16 | 8 | 18 | 76 | 96 | 0.792 | 40 | |
| 18 | Bolton Wanderers | 42 | 13 | 13 | 16 | 62 | 69 | 0.899 | 39 | |
| 19 | Blackpool | 42 | 14 | 10 | 18 | 60 | 64 | 0.938 | 38 | |
| 20 | Cardiff City | 42 | 13 | 11 | 18 | 62 | 76 | 0.816 | 37 | |
| 21 | Leicester City (R) | 42 | 12 | 11 | 19 | 74 | 86 | 0.860 | 35 | Relegation to the Second Division |
| 22 | Sheffield Wednesday (R) | 42 | 8 | 10 | 24 | 63 | 100 | 0.630 | 26 | Relegation to the Second Division |

Source: World Football
Rules for classification: 1) Points; 2) Goal average; 3) Goals scored
(C) Champions; (R) Relegated

== FA Cup ==
| Date | Round | Opponents | H / A | Result F–A | Scorers | Attendance |
|---|---|---|---|---|---|---|
| 8 January 1955 | Round 3 | Reading | A | 1–1 | Webster | 26,000 |
| 12 January 1955 | Round 3 Replay | Reading | H | 4–1 | Webster (2), Viollet, Rowley | 24,578 |
| 19 February 1955 | Round 4 | Manchester City | A | 0–2 | | 75,000 |

== Squad statistics ==
| Pos. | Name | League | | FA Cup | | Total | |
| Pos. | Name | Apps | Goals | Apps | Goals | Apps | Goals |
|---|---|---|---|---|---|---|---|
| GK | (England) Jack Crompton | 5 | 0 | 0 | 0 | 5 | 0 |
| GK | (England) Ray Wood | 37 | 0 | 3 | 0 | 40 | 0 |
| FB | (England) Geoff Bent | 2 | 0 | 0 | 0 | 2 | 0 |
| FB | (England) Roger Byrne | 39 | 2 | 3 | 0 | 42 | 2 |
| FB | (England) Bill Foulkes | 41 | 0 | 3 | 0 | 44 | 0 |
| FB | (England) Ian Greaves | 1 | 0 | 0 | 0 | 1 | 0 |
| FB | (England) Mark Jones | 13 | 0 | 0 | 0 | 13 | 0 |
| FB | (Republic of Ireland) Paddy Kennedy | 1 | 0 | 0 | 0 | 1 | 0 |
| HB | (Northern Ireland) Jackie Blanchflower | 29 | 10 | 3 | 0 | 32 | 10 |
| HB | (England) Allenby Chilton | 29 | 0 | 3 | 0 | 32 | 0 |
| HB | (England) Henry Cockburn | 1 | 0 | 0 | 0 | 1 | 0 |
| HB | (England) Duncan Edwards | 33 | 6 | 3 | 0 | 36 | 6 |
| HB | (England) Don Gibson | 32 | 0 | 3 | 0 | 35 | 0 |
| HB | (England) Freddie Goodwin | 5 | 0 | 0 | 0 | 5 | 0 |
| HB | (England) Jeff Whitefoot | 24 | 0 | 0 | 0 | 24 | 0 |
| FW | (England) Johnny Berry | 40 | 3 | 3 | 0 | 43 | 3 |
| FW | (England) David Pegg | 6 | 1 | 0 | 0 | 6 | 1 |
| FW | (England) Jack Rowley | 22 | 7 | 3 | 1 | 25 | 8 |
| FW | (England) Albert Scanlon | 14 | 4 | 0 | 0 | 14 | 4 |
| FW | (England) Tommy Taylor | 30 | 20 | 1 | 0 | 31 | 20 |
| FW | (England) Dennis Viollet | 34 | 20 | 3 | 1 | 37 | 21 |
| FW | (Wales) Colin Webster | 17 | 8 | 2 | 3 | 19 | 11 |
| FW | (Republic of Ireland) Liam Whelan | 7 | 1 | 0 | 0 | 7 | 1 |
| – | Own goals | – | 2 | – | 0 | – | 2 |
