= Busby Babes =

Manchester United footballers, many of whom died in the Munich air disaster

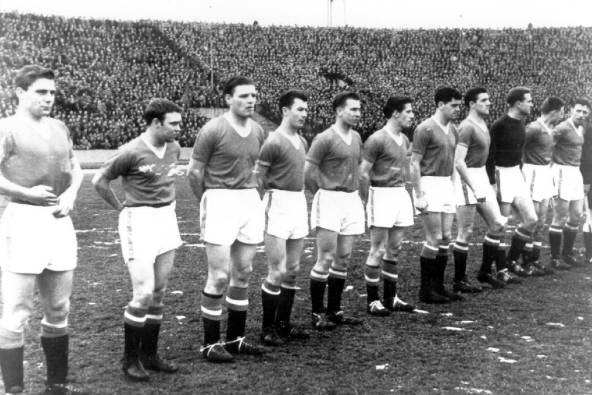
Manchester United's "Busby Babes", pictured in 1958, before their last match.

The "Busby Babes" were the group of footballers, recruited and trained by Manchester United chief scout Joe Armstrong and assistant manager Jimmy Murphy, who progressed from the club's youth team into the first team under the management of the eponymous Matt Busby from the late 1940s and throughout the 1950s. The squad most associated with the name "babes" was that of the 1957–58 season, many of whom died in the 1958 Munich air disaster, and who, with an average age of 22, had been touted to dominate European football for the next few years.

== History ==
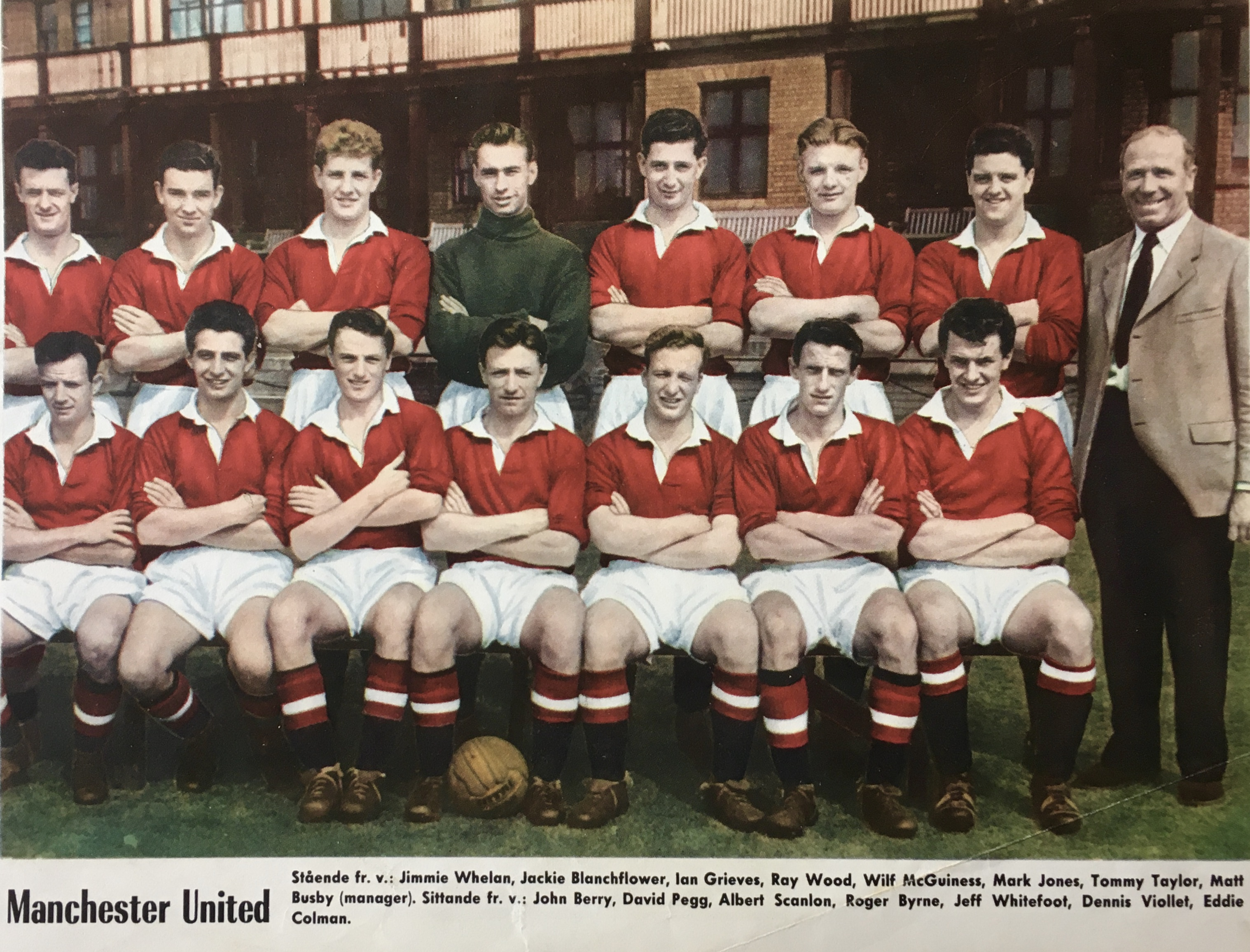
Manchester United F.C. in 1957 – from the left, standing: Liam Whelan, Jackie Blanchflower, Ian Greaves, Ray Wood, Wilf McGuinness, Mark Jones, Tommy Taylor, Matt Busby (manager); front row: Johnny Berry, David Pegg, Albert Scanlon, Roger Byrne, Jeff Whitefoot, Dennis Viollet and Eddie Colman.

The Busby Babes were notable not only for being young and gifted, but for being developed by the club itself, rather than bought from other clubs, which was customary then. The term, coined by Manchester Evening News journalist Tom Jackson in 1951, usually refers to the players who won the league championship in seasons 1955–56 and 1956–57, with an average age of 21 and 22 respectively.

Eight of the players – Roger Byrne (28), Eddie Colman (21), Mark Jones (24), Duncan Edwards (21), Liam Whelan (22), Tommy Taylor (26), David Pegg (22) and Geoff Bent (25) – died in or as a result of the Munich air disaster in February 1958. Jackie Blanchflower, 24 at the time of the crash, and senior player Johnny Berry, 31 at the time of the crash, were injured to such an extent that they never played again. Berry was the senior player in the team by the time of the crash, having been signed from Birmingham City in 1951, by which time he was 25.

A few of the players in the team at this time had been bought from other clubs. One of them, goalkeeper Ray Wood, was just 18 when he joined United from Darlington in 1949. Wood's successor in the first team, Harry Gregg, signed in December 1957 from Doncaster Rovers, as the world's most expensive goalkeeper at the time, for £23,500. Taylor had been one of the most expensive players in English football when United paid £29,999 for him as a 21-year-old from Barnsley in 1953. Berry had already been at the club for two years when Taylor arrived.

Other notable "Busby Babes" include full-back Bill Foulkes, wingers Kenny Morgans and Albert Scanlon, forward Dennis Viollet, wing-half Wilf McGuinness, who later became manager of Manchester United, and forwards John Doherty, Colin Webster and Eddie Lewis. McGuinness and Webster were not on the plane when it crashed at Munich. Doherty had just been sold to Leicester City.

Bobby Charlton, 20 at the time of the crash, retired from playing in 1975. He had left Manchester United two years earlier, and had continued playing as a player-manager of Preston North End. As a player, he set the all-time goalscoring record for Manchester United and England. It was later broken by another United player Wayne Rooney. Charlton's appearance record was unbroken for 35 years after his last game for United. His England record was not broken until 2015, when Rooney scored his 50th England goal.

Bill Foulkes, who retired in 1970, was at the club when the European Cup was won in 1968.

Harry Gregg left the club in the 1966–67 season, signing for Stoke City, who had signed Dennis Viollet from United five seasons earlier. Kenny Morgans moved to Swansea City in 1961, having rarely played for United after the end of the 1957–58 season. Albert Scanlon was sold to Newcastle United in November 1960. Wood was sold to Huddersfield Town within a year of the Munich crash, having been unable to win back his place in the team from Gregg, leaving Old Trafford around the same time as Colin Webster, who was sold to Swansea Town.

Wilf McGuinness suffered a broken leg in a reserve match during the 1959–60 season and never returned to the first team. He stayed with the club as a member of the coaching staff, and spent 18 months as United's manager after the retirement of Busby in May 1969. Injury ended the career of John Doherty, who played his last game for Leicester City less than a year after United sold him to the East Midlands club.

Sammy McIlroy was born in Belfast and moved to Manchester United in 1969, making him Busby's final signing, and "the last of the Busby Babes". Jeff Whitefoot has also been called "the last of the Busby Babes".

== In popular culture ==
The Busby Babes were first portrayed in the television film United (2011), which focuses on the relationship between Jimmy Murphy (David Tennant) and Bobby Charlton (Jack O'Connell), in the aftermath of the Munich air disaster. Although fellow Scot Dougray Scott played the role of Matt Busby, Busby's son was reportedly disgusted with the depiction of his father, claiming that Busby was the first tracksuit manager, whereas in the film, this defining feature is given to Murphy. Of the Busby Babes shown in the film, Eddie Colman, Duncan Edwards, Harry Gregg, Mark Jones and David Pegg, are portrayed by Philip Hill-Pearson, Sam Claflin, Ben Peel, Thomas Howes and Brogan West, respectively. United also depicted Jones as the club captain; in actuality, it was Roger Byrne, who was omitted from the film.

The Busby Babes were next portrayed in the film Believe (2013), a semi-fictional story set in 1980s Manchester, in which an older Busby (Brian Cox) manages a boys' team in a local cup. The Busby Babes have a smaller role in the film, and are shown in flashbacks (as part of Busby's nightmares stemming from the Munich air disaster) and as a hallucination towards the film's climax. The following Busby Babes shown in the film included Geoff Bent (Lee Buckley), Roger Byrne (Daniel Shannon), Bobby Charlton (Daniel Swann), Eddie Coleman (Danny Leech), Duncan Edwards (George Gladstone), Mark Jones (Michael Jukes), David Pegg (Michael Ferguson), Tommy Taylor (Dean Bowman) and Liam Whelan (Matthew Leeming).

Fulwell 73 produced a documentary film, Busby (2019), which covered Busby's time in charge of Manchester United. The film makes use of archival footage, as by this point, most of the Busby Babes had died. However, Wilf McGuinness and Jeff Whitefoot appear as talking heads, while Bobby Charlton appeared via voiceover.

== See also ==
- Fergie's Fledglings
- United (2011 film)
