= Roger Byrne =

English footballer (1929–1958)

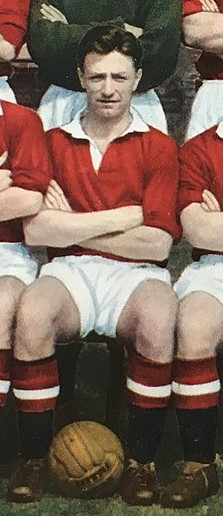
- Byrne in 1957

Personal information
- Full name: Roger William Byrne
- Date of birth: 8 September 1929
- Place of birth: Gorton, Manchester, Lancashire, England
- Date of death: 6 February 1958 (aged 28)
- Place of death: Munich, West Germany
- Height: 5 ft 9 in (1.75 m)
- Position: Full-back

Youth career
- Ryder Brow Boys Club
- 1949–1951: Manchester United

Senior career*
Years	Team	Apps	(Gls)
1951–1958	Manchester United	245	(17)

International career
1954–1957	England	33	(0)
- * Club domestic league appearances and goals

Roger William Byrne (8 September 1929 – 6 February 1958) was an English footballer who played as a full-back and captain of Manchester United and was one of the eight Manchester United players who lost their lives in the Munich Air Disaster on 6 February 1958. He made 33 appearances for the England national team.

== Biography ==
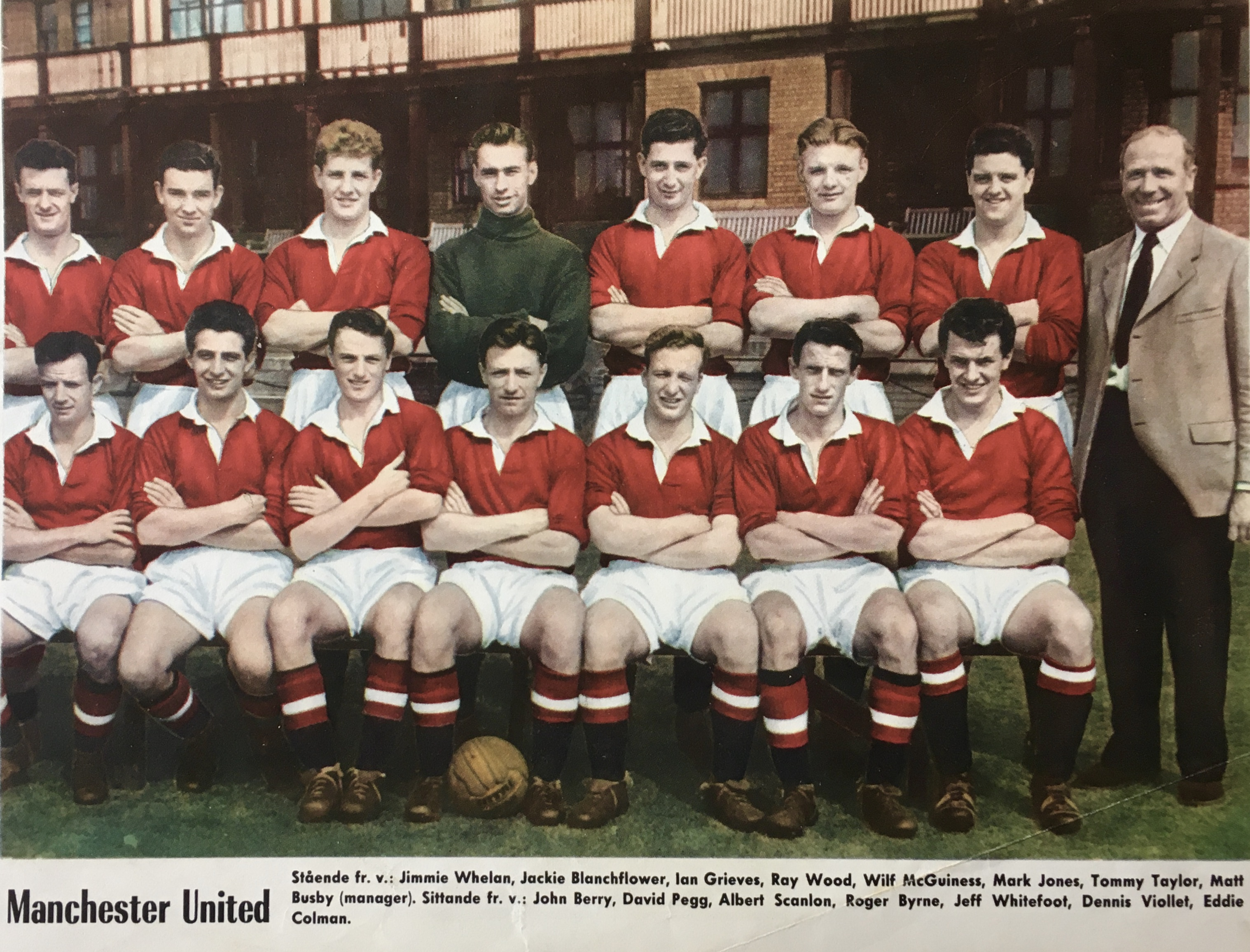
Byrne (front row, centre) in a Manchester United team photo in 1957

Byrne was born on 8 September 1929 in the Gorton district of Manchester, the only child of William Henry Byrne (1894–1972) and Jessie Byrne (1899–1986). Byrne undertook two years of National Service in the Royal Air Force, where he was not considered good enough to play football and played rugby instead. While playing for Ryder Brow, Byrne came to the attention of United scout Joe Armstrong and was offered amateur terms at the club, turning professional soon after, becoming the first of what would come to be known as the Busby Babes.

Byrne was captain of Manchester United from the 1955–56 season onwards. He captained the side through the legendary Busby Babes era, playing as a left-sided full-back of the traditional style. He had previously been fielded at wing half and outside left and it was a testament to his versatility that, despite being naturally right sided, he should have been a success in a variety of positions.

Byrne was not regarded as the most naturally talented footballer. His tackling was sometimes questionable and his aerial skills were seen as merely average, but his exceptional work ethic and footballing intelligence enabled him to position himself well and respond quickly to threats. Innovatively, he was also adept at making forward runs and joining attacks at a time when full-backs were expected only to stand back and defend. Perhaps his best asset was his ability to inspire players with his charismatic leadership. Even more than 60 years after his death, he is still regarded as one of Manchester United's greatest captains. He earned league-winner's medals in 1952, 1956 and 1957, and was an FA Cup runner-up to Aston Villa in 1957. He also helped United reach the semi-finals of the European Cup in 1957, when they were the English Football League's first entrants into the competition.

Byrne was also a regular member of Walter Winterbottom's England team during the 1950s and was considered a possible captain of the national team after the retirement of the incumbent captain, Billy Wright, whose career continued until 1959. His total of 33 England caps were all won in consecutive fixtures. He appeared in every England international from his debut against Scotland in April 1954 to his last match against France in November 1957. This remains a record. Byrne never scored a goal for England; he took two penalties during his England career, but both were missed against Brazil and Yugoslavia in 1956.

He died in the Munich air disaster at the age of 28. Byrne was the oldest of the eight players who perished at Munich. On arriving home he would have received the news that his wife Joy was expecting their first child. They had only married the previous year. He was also survived by both of his parents at that time. Byrne's funeral service was held at Flixton parish church and his body was cremated.

He was in the side which ousted Red Star Belgrade in the quarter-finals of the European Cup.

Eight months after Byrne's death (7 October 1958), Roger Jr. was born. During the late 1960s and early 1970s he was a ball boy at Old Trafford. Roger Jr. died of cancer in December 2011 at age 53. He was living in Swindon, Wiltshire, and had been working in a senior role for the local council. He was survived by his mother, Joy, who by this stage was well into her seventies.

Some years after his death, a street on a new housing development in Newton Heath near Manchester city centre was named after him – Roger Byrne Close. Other roads and paths on the estate include Tommy Taylor Close, Eddie Colman Close, Mark Jones Walk, Billy Whelan Walk and David Pegg Walk, as well as a housing complex called Duncan Edwards Court, all of which are named after other players who died at Munich.

A biography, Roger Byrne, Captain of the Busby Babes, written by Iain McCartney, was published on 2 December 2000. The 2011 television drama United centred on the successes of the Busby Babes and the decimation of the team in the Munich air disaster, wrongly named Mark Jones as the captain of the team, while Byrne was not mentioned as a member of the team.

== Career statistics ==
=== Club ===
Appearances and goals by club, season and competition
Club	Season	League		FA Cup		European Cup		Other		Total	
Club	Season	Apps	Goals	Apps	Goals	Apps	Goals	Apps	Goals	Apps	Goals
Manchester United	1951–52	24	7	1	0	0	0	0	0	25	7
Manchester United	1952–53	40	2	4	1	0	0	1	1	45	4
Manchester United	1953–54	41	3	1	0	0	0	0	0	42	3
Manchester United	1954–55	39	2	3	0	0	0	0	0	42	2
Manchester United	1955–56	39	3	1	0	0	0	0	0	40	3
Manchester United	1956–57	36	0	6	1	8	0	1	0	51	1
Manchester United	1957–58	26	0	2	0	6	0	1	0	35	0
Total		245	17	18	2	14	0	3	1	280	20

=== International ===
Appearances and goals by national team and year
National team	Year	Apps	Goals
England	1954	9	0
England	1955	8	0
England	1956	9	0
England	1957	7	0
Total		33	0

== Honours ==
Manchester United

- Football League First Division: 1951–52, 1955–56, 1956–57
- FA Charity Shield: 1952, 1956, 1957
- FA Cup runner-up: 1956–57
