= Peter Berry (footballer) =

English footballer (1933–2016)

Personal information
- Full name: Peter Berry
- Date of birth: 20 September 1933
- Place of birth: Aldershot, England
- Date of death: 8 October 2016 (aged 83)
- Place of death: Aldershot, England
- Position: Forward

Youth career
- ?–1951: Crystal Palace

Senior career*
Years	Team	Apps	(Gls)
1951–1958	Crystal Palace	151	(27)
1958–1961	Ipswich Town	38	(6)
Total		189	(33)
- * Club domestic league appearances and goals

Peter Berry (20 September 1933 – 8 October 2016) was an English professional footballer who played as a forward. He made a total of 189 Football League appearances for Crystal Palace and Ipswich Town scoring 33 goals. He was the younger brother of Manchester United and England outside right Johnny Berry, whose career was ended by the Munich air disaster.

== Playing career ==
Berry was born in Aldershot, Hampshire, the son of Mary (née O'Connor) and Reginald Berry, a Sergeant in the RHA; he lived with his family on Crimea Road in the town.

Berry began his youth career at Crystal Palace and signed professional terms in August 1951. However his career was then interrupted by National Service and he did not make his debut until January 1954. He began his career as a winger but played mainly as an inside forward and could also play at centre forward. Over the following four seasons Berry was a regular in the Palace first team making a total of 151 League appearances, scoring 27 times. In May 1958, Berry was signed, together with Palace colleague Jimmy Belcher for Ipswich Town, by then manager Alf Ramsay. However, in September 1959, Berry suffered an injury which would ultimately end his career and he retired as a result of this in June 1961, after 38 appearances and 6 goals for Ipswich.

== Post-retirement ==
After retiring as a player, Berry set up a sports shop during the 1960s, working in partnership with his brother Johnny in Cove, Hampshire. His brother had survived the Munich air disaster in 1958 but his injuries were too severe for him to resume his playing career. Peter Berry died in Aldershot on 8 October 2016, aged 83.
