= Ron Batty =

English footballer and manager

Personal information
- Full name: Ronald Robson Batty
- Date of birth: 5 October 1925
- Place of birth: Lanchester, England
- Date of death: 1971 (aged 45–46)
- Position: Full-back

Senior career*
Years	Team	Apps	(Gls)
- Stanley United
1945–1958	Newcastle United	161	(1)
1958–1959	Gateshead	40	(0)
Total		201	(1)

Managerial career
- 1958–1960: Gateshead
- * Club domestic league appearances and goals

Ronald Robson Batty (born 5 October 1925 in Lanchester, County Durham - died 1971) was an English football full-back. He began his career with non-league Stanley United before signing for Newcastle United during the Second World War. He appeared for the club in 161 league games, scoring one goal. He left the club in 1958 to move to Gateshead where he added a further 40 league appearances before retiring. He played at left back in the FA Cup winning Newcastle United team of 1955

== Career statistics ==
Club	Season	League		FA Cup		Other		Total	
Club	Season	Apps	Goals	Apps	Goals	Apps	Goals	Apps	Goals
Newcastle United	1948–49	30	0	1	0	0	0	31	0
Newcastle United	1949–50	18	0	2	0	0	0	20	0
Newcastle United	1950–51	3	0	0	0	0	0	3	0
Newcastle United	1951–52	2	0	0	0	0	0	2	0
Newcastle United	1952–53	11	0	0	0	1 (Note: Appearance in Charity Shield)	0	12	0
Newcastle United	1953–54	13	0	1	0	0	0	14	0
Newcastle United	1954–55	25	0	10	0	0	0	35	0
Newcastle United	1955–56	22	0	2	0	0	0	24	0
Newcastle United	1956–57	24	0	3	0	0	0	27	0
Newcastle United	1957–58	13	1	1	0	0	0	14	1
Newcastle United	Total	161	1	20	0	1	0	182	1
Gateshead	1957–58	9	0	0	0	0	0	9	0
Gateshead	1958–59	31	0	1	0	0	0	32	0
Gateshead	Total	40	0	1	0	0	0	41	0
Career Total		201	1	21	0	1	0	223	1

== Honours ==
Newcastle United

- FA Cup: 1954–55
