= John Walton (footballer) =

English footballer

John Andrews Walton (born 21 March 1928 – 17 July 1979) was an English footballer. His regular position was as a forward. He was born in Horwich, Lancashire.

Walton began his career as an amateur and represented England at amateur level. He enjoyed two spells with Bury and also spent time at Manchester United, Burnley, Coventry City, Chester and non-league side Kettering Town.

He is sometimes referred to as Johnny Walton.

== Bibliography ==
- Hugman, Barry (2005). The PFA Premier & Football League Players' Records 1946-2005. Queen Anne Press. ISBN 1-85291-665-6.
