= Ernie Bond (footballer) =

English footballer (1929–2025)

Personal information
- Full name: James Ernest Bond
- Date of birth: 4 May 1929
- Place of birth: Preston, England
- Date of death: 28 November 2025 (aged 96)
- Height: 5 ft 6 in (1.68 m)
- Position: Outside left

Senior career*
Years	Team	Apps	(Gls)
- Leyland Motors
1950–1952	Manchester United	20	(4)
1952–1959	Carlisle United	192	(24)
1959	Queen of the South	1	(1)
- * Club domestic league appearances and goals

James Ernest Bond (4 May 1929 – 28 November 2025) was an English professional footballer who played as an outside left. Born in Preston, he played in the Football League for Manchester United and Carlisle United and in the Scottish League for Queen of the South.

Bond was born on 4 May 1929. He played for Leyland Motors before transferring to Manchester United in December 1950, where he helped the club win the 1952 League title. In September 1952, he was transferred to Carlisle United, where he spent seven seasons before moving on to Queen of the South. Bond died on 28 November 2025, at the age of 96.

== Honours ==
Manchester United

- First Division: 1951-52
