= Kenny Morgans =

Welsh footballer (1939–2012)

Personal information
- Full name: Kenneth Godfrey Morgans
- Date of birth: 16 March 1939
- Place of birth: Swansea, Glamorgan, Wales
- Date of death: 18 November 2012 (aged 73)
- Position: Outside right

Youth career
- Manchester United

Senior career*
Years	Team	Apps	(Gls)
1956–1961	Manchester United	17	(0)
1961–1964	Swansea Town	54	(8)
1964–1967	Newport County	125	(44)
1967–1968	Barry Town	24	(4)
1968–?	Cwmbran Town		
- * Club domestic league appearances and goals

Kenneth Godfrey Morgans (16 March 1939 – 18 November 2012) was a Welsh footballer. Born in Swansea, he signed for Manchester United on leaving school in the summer of 1955 and played on the youth team's outside-right position. He turned professional in 1956 but continued to play for the youth team until the following year, and was captain of the FA Youth Cup winning team in 1957.

== Career ==
Morgans began his playing career as an apprentice for Manchester United in the mid 1950s, and captained the 1957 FA Youth Cup winning side.

He made his first team debut on 21 December 1957, aged 18, against Leicester City in a league match at Old Trafford, and was selected ahead of the club's senior player and regular right-winger Johnny Berry for United’s subsequent fixtures over the next few weeks.

He was injured in the Munich air disaster on 6 February 1958, when still only 18 years old.

He was the youngest player involved in the crash and the last survivor to be rescued from the mangled wreckage of the BEA Elizabethan airliner after he was found unconscious amongst the debris by two journalists five hours after the official search was called off. He had played in the last match before the disaster, the European Cup quarter-final second leg against Red Star Belgrade, and had so far made 10 senior appearances for United. He was discharged from hospital by the end of that month.

Although he made a full recovery following the crash and was back in the side before the end of the season, playing a further nine games, he showed little of his previous form on the pitch, and made just four appearances for the first team over the next three seasons, as new signings and youth team graduates gradually established themselves as regular choices in the forward and wide positions.

He finally left United in 1961, having made 23 first-team appearances without scoring a goal, and signed for Swansea Town in a £3,000 deal. He then played for Newport County, where he played his last Football League game in 1967 at the age of 28. He then played for Barry Town and his final role in football was as player-manager of Cwmbran Town in the Welsh League.

After leaving Manchester United in 1961, he had returned to his native South Wales, where he lived until the end of his life. In 1972 he was appointed as manager of Welsh Football League side Blaenavon Blues where he managed them for a season.

== Later life and death ==
After leaving football, he worked as a pub landlord for 10 years at the Lower New Inn Pub in Pontypool, South Wales. He later finished his working life as a ship's chandler. Morgans rarely spoke to the media about the Munich air disaster or his time with Manchester United until he was well into his sixties, but during the early years of the 21st century, he contributed to a number of media projects, including television documentaries, centred on the Busby Babes and the Munich Air Disaster.

Morgans was taken ill at his home in Swansea on 17 November 2012 and admitted to hospital. He died the next morning at the age of 73. He was survived by Stephanie, his wife more than 50 years, and their sons John and Greg.

== Personal life ==
Morgans was the uncle of footballer Aaron Lewis.
