= John Doherty (English footballer) =

English footballer and manager

Personal information
- Full name: John Peter Doherty
- Date of birth: 12 March 1935
- Place of birth: Manchester, England
- Date of death: 13 November 2007 (aged 72)
- Position: Forward

Senior career*
Years	Team	Apps	(Gls)
1952–1957	Manchester United		
1957	Leicester City		
- Rugby Town
- Altrincham
- * Club domestic league appearances and goals

John Peter Doherty (12 March 1935 – 13 November 2007) was an English footballer. His regular position was at inside right.

Born in Manchester, Doherty started his professional career with Manchester United in 1952. He was part of the United squad that won the 1955–56 league title and scored seven goals in 26 appearances. In October 1957, he was transferred to Leicester City for £6,500. His exit from Old Trafford came just before eight of his United colleagues lost their lives in the Munich air disaster; he was in a Leicester hospital undergoing surgery for a knee injury when he heard the news.

He left Leicester after only one season due to his knee related problems, before moving on to Rugby Town, and then to Altrincham.

In the autumn of 1958, when Arsenal made an offer to Manchester United assistant manager Jimmy Murphy to become their new manager, Murphy offered Doherty the chance to become his assistant if he took charge at the North London club. However, Murphy then decided against moving to Arsenal and the partnership never happened

As of 2006, John was chairman of the Former Manchester United Players Association and co-authored the book The Insider's Guide to Manchester United with Ivan Ponting, where he gave his opinion of over 300 United players (including himself) since 1950. He was the driving force behind a friendly match at Old Trafford in 1998 to raise money for the families of the Munich victims on the disaster's 40th anniversary.

Doherty died of lung cancer in November 2007 at the age of 72.
