= Duncan Edwards =

English footballer (1936–1958)

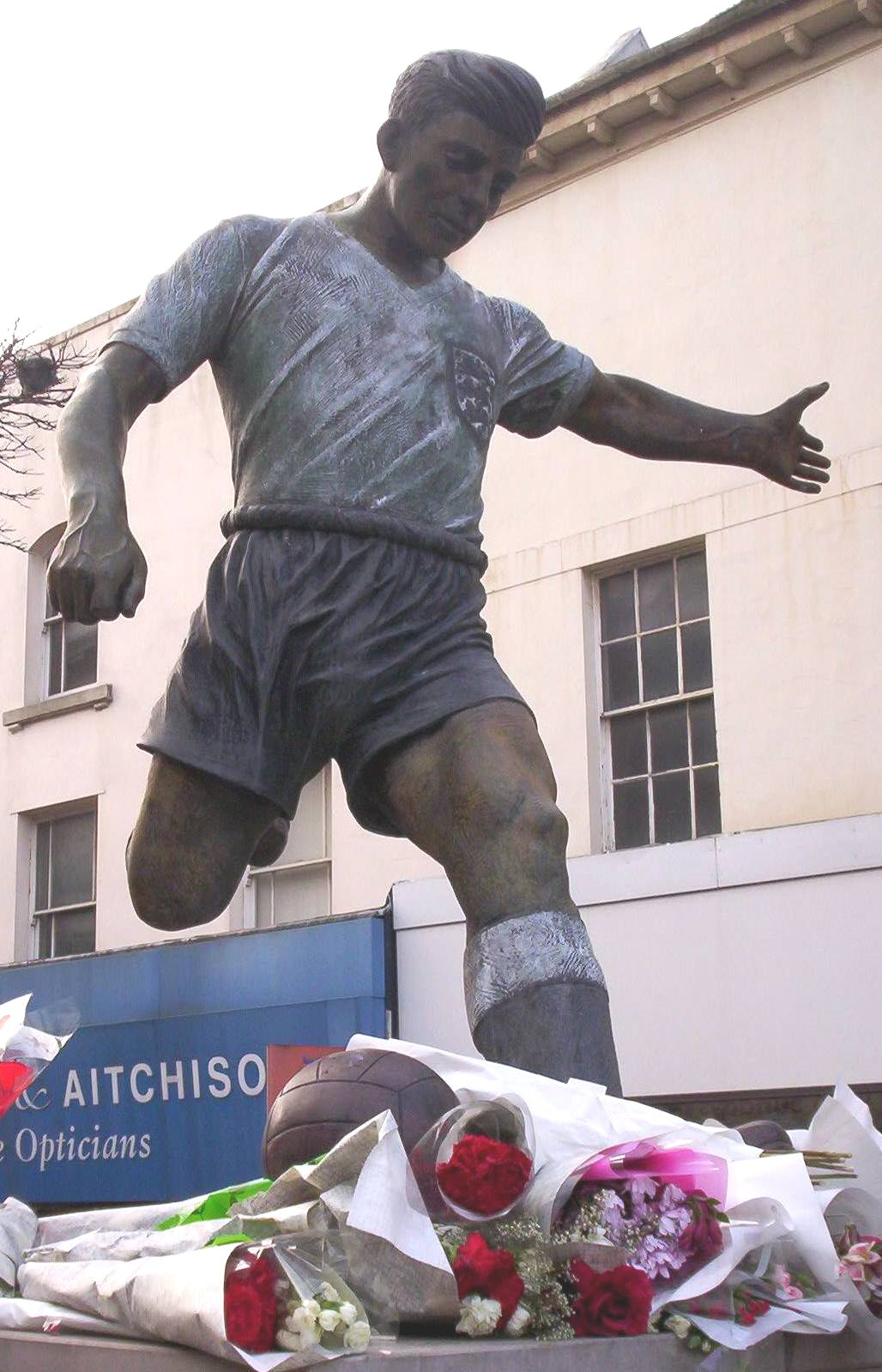
- The statue of Edwards in the centre of his home town of Dudley

Personal information
- Full name: Duncan Edwards
- Date of birth: 1 October 1936
- Place of birth: Woodside, Dudley, England
- Date of death: 21 February 1958 (aged 21)
- Place of death: Munich, West Germany
- Height: 5 ft 11 in (1.80 m)
- Position: Left half

Youth career
- 1952–1953: Manchester United

Senior career*
| Years | Team | Apps | (Gls) |
| 1953–1958 | Manchester United | 151 | (20) |

International career
| 1949–1952 | England Schoolboys | 9 | (0) |
| 1954–1957 | England U23 | 6 | (5) |
| 1953–1954 | England B | 4 | (0) |
| 1955–1957 | England | 18 | (5) |
- * Club domestic league appearances and goals

Duncan Edwards (1 October 1936 – 21 February 1958) was an English footballer who played as a left-half for Manchester United and the England national team. He was one of the Busby Babes, the young United team formed under manager Matt Busby in the mid-1950s, playing 177 matches for the club. He was noted for his physical strength, toughness, and level of authority on the pitch, and has been ranked amongst the toughest players of all time. One of eight players who died as a result of the Munich air disaster, he survived initially but succumbed to his injuries in hospital two weeks later. Many of his contemporaries have described him as one of the best, if not the best, players with whom they had played.

Born in Woodside, Dudley, Edwards signed for Manchester United as a teenager and went on to become the youngest player to play in the Football League First Division and at the time the youngest England player since the Second World War, going on to play 18 times for his country at top level. In a professional career of less than five years he helped United to win two Football League championships and two FA Charity Shields, and reach the semi-finals of the European Cup.

== Early life ==
Duncan Edwards was born on 1 October 1936 at 23 Malvern Crescent in the Woodside district of Dudley. (Note: Dudley is currently in the West Midlands county but was in Worcestershire at the time of Edwards' birth.) He was the first child of Gladstone and Sarah Ann Edwards and their only child to survive to adulthood, his younger sister Carol Anne dying in 1947 at the age of 14 weeks. His cousin, three years his senior, was Dennis Stevens, who also went on to become a professional footballer. Another cousin was Ray Westwood.

Soon after Edwards was born, his family moved to 31 Elm Road on the Priory Estate, also in Dudley. Edwards attended Priory Infant and Junior Schools from 1941 to 1948, and Wolverhampton Street Secondary School from 1948 to 1952. He played football for his school as well as for Dudley Schools, Worcestershire and Birmingham and District teams, and also represented his school at morris dancing. He was selected to compete in the National Morris and Sword Dancing Festival, but was also offered a trial for the English Schools Football Association's under-14 team, which fell on the same day, and opted to attend the latter.

Edwards impressed the selectors and was chosen to play for the English Schools XI, making his debut against the equivalent team from Wales at Wembley Stadium on 1 April 1950. He was soon appointed captain of the team, a position he held for two seasons. By this stage, he had already attracted the attention of major clubs, with Manchester United scout Jack O'Brien reporting back to manager Matt Busby in 1948 that he had "today seen a 12-year-old schoolboy who merits special watching. His name is Duncan Edwards, of Dudley."

Joe Mercer, who was then coaching the England schools team, urged Busby to sign Edwards, who was also attracting interest from Wolverhampton Wanderers and Aston Villa. Edwards signed for United as an amateur on 2 June 1952, but accounts of when he signed his first professional contract vary. Some reports state that it occurred on his 17th birthday in October 1953, but others contend that it took place a year earlier. Those accounts that favour the earlier date usually state that a club official, either Busby himself or coach Bert Whalley, arrived at the Edwards family home soon after midnight to secure the youngster's signature as early as possible, but other reports claim that this occurred when he signed his amateur contract. Wolves manager Stan Cullis was indignant at missing out on a highly touted local youngster and accused United of improperly offering financial inducements to Edwards or his family, but Edwards maintained that he had always wanted to play for the Lancashire team. To guard against the possibility that he might not make a success of his football career, he also began an apprenticeship as a carpenter.

== Career ==
Edwards began his Manchester United career in the youth team and made several appearances for the team that won the first ever FA Youth Cup in 1953, but by the time of the final had already made his debut for the first team. On 4 April 1953 he played in a Football League First Division match against Cardiff City, which United lost 4–1, aged just 16 years and 185 days. Mindful of the fact that his team contained a large number of ageing players, Busby was keen to bring new young players through the ranks. Edwards, along with the likes of Dennis Viollet and Jackie Blanchflower, was among a number of youngsters introduced to the team that season, and the new group of players came to be known collectively as the Busby Babes. Reviewing his performance on his first-team debut the Manchester Guardian newspaper commented that "he showed promise of fine ability in passing and shooting, but will have to move faster as a wing half".

The 1953–54 season saw Edwards emerge as a semi-regular player in the United first team. After impressing in a friendly against Kilmarnock he replaced the injured Henry Cockburn for the away match against Huddersfield Town on 31 October 1953, and went on to appear in 24 league matches as well as United's FA Cup defeat to Burnley. Nonetheless he was also still an active part of the youth squad and played in the team which won the Youth Cup for the second consecutive season. He made his first appearance for the national under-23 team on 20 January 1954 in Italy, and was considered for inclusion in the full England team, but on the day when the selection committee watched him in action, against Arsenal on 27 March, he gave a poor performance and was not called up.

The following season, he established himself as United's regular left-half, making 36 first-team appearances and scoring his first goals at senior level, finishing the season with six to his name. His performances revived calls for him to be selected for the senior England team, and a member of the selection committee was despatched to watch him play against Huddersfield Town on 18 September 1954, when he was just short of his 18th birthday, but nothing came of it in the short term, although he was selected for a Football League XI which played an exhibition match against a Scottish League team. In March he played for England B against an equivalent team from Germany and, despite being criticised in the press for his "poor showing", was called up for the full national team a week later. He made his debut in a match against Scotland on 2 April 1955 in the British Home Championship aged 18 years and 183 days, making him England's youngest debutant since the Second World War, a record which stood for 43 years, until Michael Owen made his England debut in February 1998. Three weeks later United took advantage of the fact that he was still eligible for the youth team to select him for the club's third consecutive FA Youth Cup final. The decision to field an England international player in the youth team was heavily criticised, and Matt Busby was forced to pen a newspaper article defending this decision, which paid off for United as the wing-half was instrumental in a third Youth Cup win. By now, the younger players were rapidly taking over the first team.

In May 1955, Edwards was selected for the England squad which travelled to mainland Europe for matches against France, Portugal and Spain, starting all three matches. Upon returning from the tour, he began a two-year stint in the British Army with the Royal Army Ordnance Corps. Army service was compulsory at the time for all men of his age under the national service scheme, with the exception of students and those working in certain trades. He was stationed at Nesscliffe near Shrewsbury along with teammate Bobby Charlton, 12 months his junior, but was allowed leave to play for United. He also served in Wales alongside future Tottenham Hotspur manager Keith Burkinshaw. Edwards took part in army matches, and in one season played nearly 100 matches in total. In the 1955–56 season, despite missing nearly two months of action due to a severe bout of influenza, Edwards played 33 times as United won the championship of the Football League by a margin of 11 points ahead of their nearest challengers Blackpool. The following season he made 34 league appearances, taking his total past the 100 mark, as United won a second consecutive league title, and was also in the team that contested the 1957 FA Cup Final, in which United missed out on the Double after a 2–1 defeat to Aston Villa. He also made seven appearances during United's first ever foray into the European Cup, including a 10–0 win over Anderlecht which remains the club's biggest-ever margin of victory. United reached the semi-finals of this competition, being ousted by Real Madrid.

By now he was also a regular in the England team, featuring in all four of England's qualifying matches for the 1958 World Cup and scoring two goals in the 5–2 win over Denmark on 5 December 1956. He was expected to be a key player for England in the 1958 World Cup, and was seen as a likely candidate to replace the ageing Billy Wright as national team captain.

Edwards began the 1957–58 season in good form and rumours abounded that top Italian clubs were seeking to sign him, as United battled with Wolverhampton Wanderers in their bid for a third successive league title, and made a strong start to their quest in the FA Cup and European Cup. His final match in England took place on 1 February 1958, when he scored the opening goal to help United defeat Arsenal 5–4 at Highbury. The press were critical of his performance, with the Sunday Pictorial's correspondent writing that he did not "think [Edwards'] display in this thrilling game would impress England team manager Walter Winterbottom, who was watching. He was clearly at fault for Arsenal's fourth goal when, instead of clearing, he dallied on the ball". Five days later he played his last ever match as United drew 3–3 away to Red Star Belgrade to progress to the semi-finals of the European Cup by an aggregate score of 5–4.

== Death ==
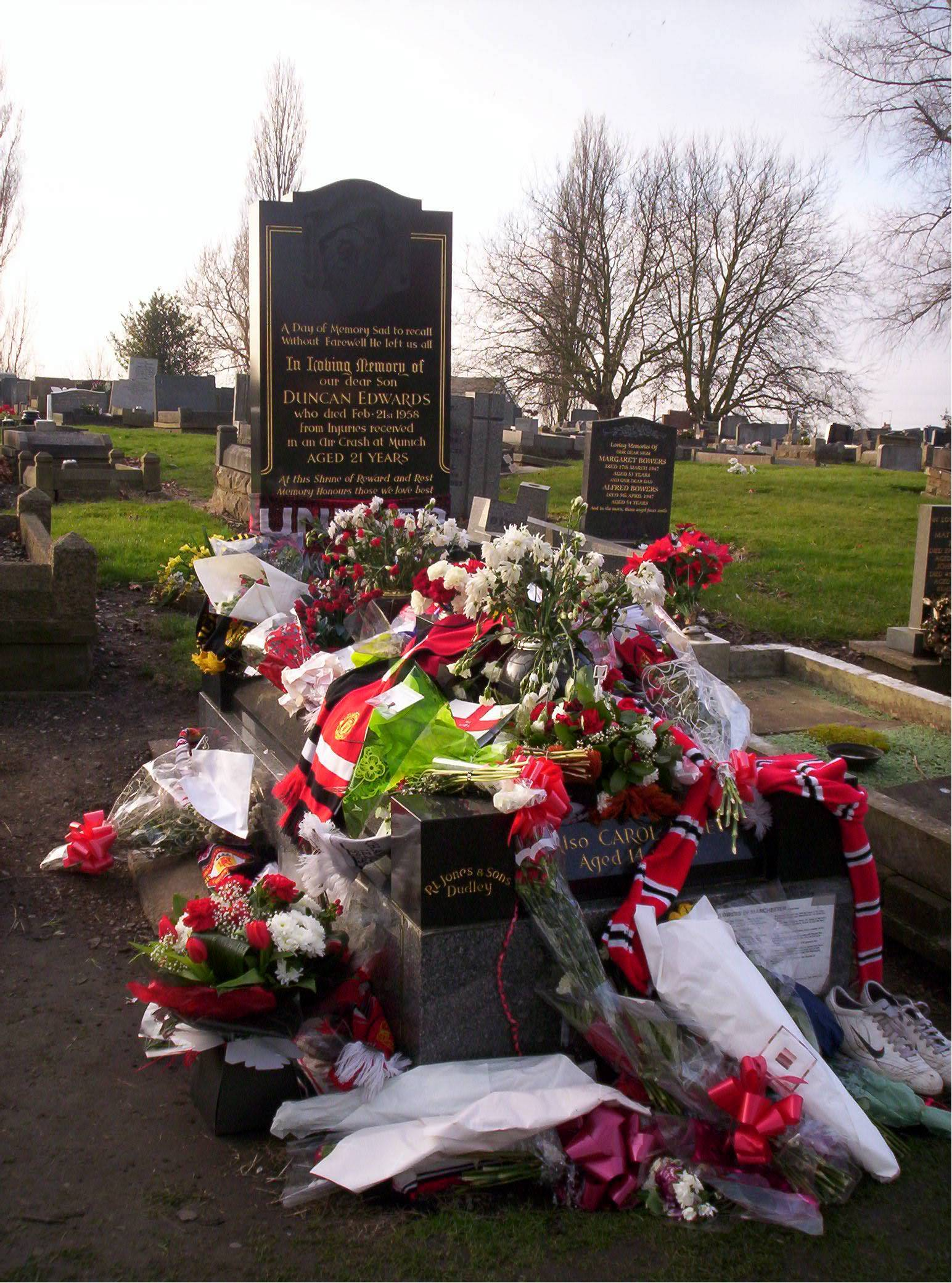
Edwards is buried in Dudley Cemetery, and his grave still attracts many tributes from fans.

Returning home from Belgrade on 6 February 1958, the aeroplane carrying Edwards and his teammates crashed on takeoff after a refuelling stop in Munich, Germany. Seven players and 14 other passengers died at the scene, and Edwards was taken to the Rechts der Isar Hospital suffering from many serious injuries including multiple leg fractures, fractured ribs and severely damaged kidneys. The doctors treating him were confident that he could recover, but were doubtful that he would ever be able to play football again.

Edwards regained consciousness soon after reaching the hospital. Over the next two weeks, his condition fluctuated. Doctors had an artificial kidney rushed to the hospital for him, but the artificial organ reduced his blood's ability to clot and he began to bleed internally. Despite this, the day after the crash he asked assistant manager Jimmy Murphy, "What time is the kick off against Wolves, Jimmy? I mustn't miss that match." By 14 February, his condition was reported to have "dramatically improved". By 19 February, his condition had deteriorated again, and it was reported that he was "sinking rapidly", with use of the artificial kidney machine developing into a "vicious circle, gradually sapping his strength".

Doctors had said several days earlier that they were "amazed" at his fight for life, and the next day a "very slight improvement" in his condition was reported. Nurses noticed that his circulation was failing, and injections briefly improved this, but his strength ebbed away and medical staff were unable to save him. He died at 2:15 a.m. on 21 February 1958. Hours before his death, by coincidence, a new issue of Charles Buchan's Football Monthly was published in the United Kingdom, with a photograph of a smiling Edwards on the cover.

Edwards was buried at Dudley Cemetery five days later, alongside his sister Carol Anne. More than 5,000 people lined the streets of Dudley for his funeral. His tombstone reads: "A day of memory, Sad to recall, Without farewell, He left us all" and his grave is regularly visited by fans.

== Legacy ==
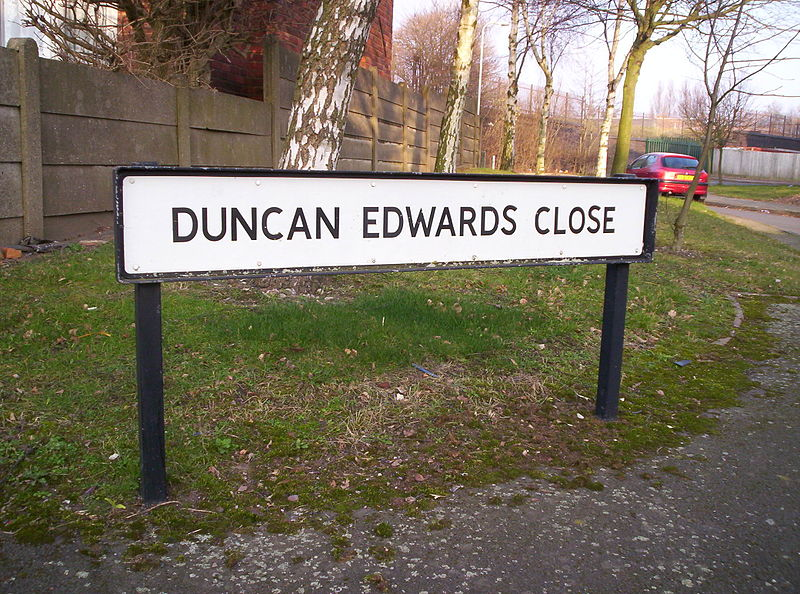
A street in Dudley was named in honour of Edwards.

Edwards has been commemorated in a number of ways in his home town of Dudley. A stained-glass window depicting Edwards, designed by Francis Skeat and paid for with donations from Football League clubs Brentford and Crystal Palace, was unveiled in St Francis's Church, the parish church for the Priory Estate, by Matt Busby in 1961, and a statue of Edwards unveiled in the centre of the town in October 1999 by his mother and his former teammate Bobby Charlton.

In 1993, a cul-de-sac of housing association homes near to the cemetery in which he is buried was named "Duncan Edwards Close". The Wren's Nest pub on the Priory Estate, near where he grew up, was renamed "The Duncan Edwards" in honour of him in 2001, but it closed within five years and was subsequently destroyed by arsonists before being demolished. In 2006, a £100,000 games facility was opened in Priory Park, where Edwards often played as a boy, in his memory. It was unveiled by Bobby Charlton. In 2008, Dudley's southern bypass was renamed 'Duncan Edwards Way' in his memory—this road had coincidentally opened to traffic nearly a decade earlier on the same day that his statue was unveiled.

Until its closure in 2016, Dudley Museum and Art Gallery hosted an exhibition of memorabilia devoted to his career, including his England caps. This collection had originally been displayed at Dudley Leisure Centre in 1986, again with his mother and Bobby Charlton in attendance.

A housing complex called Duncan Edwards Court exists in Manchester among a network of streets named after his fellow Munich victims, including Eddie Colman, Roger Byrne and Tommy Taylor. On 8 July 2011 a Blue Plaque was unveiled by Bobby Charlton at the site of the digs in Stretford where Edwards and other United players lived, and in 2016 local dignitaries in Dudley launched a fundraising drive with the aim of placing a similar plaque in the town. In 2022, a new leisure centre complex opened in Dudley and was named the Duncan Edwards Leisure Centre.

In 1996, Edwards was one of five deceased players chosen to appear on British stamps issued as part of a "Football Legends" set issued to commemorate the UEFA Euro 1996 tournament, which England was hosting. He was portrayed by Sam Claflin in the 2011 British TV film United centred on the Munich disaster and the success of the team in the two years leading up to it.

Contemporaries of Edwards have been unstinting in their praise of his abilities. Bobby Charlton described him as the best he ever saw or was likely to see. He also considered Edwards "the only player that made me feel inferior" and said his death was "the biggest single tragedy ever to happen to Manchester United and English football". Terry Venables said that, had he lived, it would have been Edwards, not Bobby Moore, who lifted the World Cup trophy as England captain in 1966. Tommy Docherty stated that "there is no doubt in my mind that Duncan would have become the greatest player ever. Not just in British football, with United and England, but the best in the world. George Best was something special, as was Pelé and Maradona, but in my mind Duncan was much better in terms of all-round ability and skill." In recognition of his talents Edwards was made an inaugural inductee to the English Football Hall of Fame in 2002. His memorabilia were exhibited at Dudley Museum prior to its closure, and was subsequently sold to Manchester United with a selection to be loaned back for display at the Dudley Archives.

== Style of play ==
Physically, he was enormous. He was strong and had a fantastic football brain. His ability was complete – right foot, left foot, long passing, short passing. He did everything instinctively.

— Bobby Charlton

Although he is primarily remembered as a defensive midfielder, Edwards is said to have been able to operate in any outfield position. His versatility was such that on one occasion he started the match playing as an emergency striker in place of one injured player before being switched to central defence in place of another. His greatest assets were his physical strength and his level of authority on the pitch, which was said to be remarkable for such a young player, and he was particularly noted for his high level of stamina. Stanley Matthews described him as being "like a rock in a raging sea", and Bobby Moore likened him to the Rock of Gibraltar when defending but also noted that he was "dynamic coming forward". His imposing physique earned him the nicknames "Big Dunc" and "The Tank", and he has been ranked amongst the toughest players of all time.

Edwards was noted for the power and timing of his tackles and for his ability to pass and shoot equally well with both feet. He was known for his surging runs up the pitch and was equally skilled at heading the ball and at striking fierce long-range shots. After scoring a goal on 26 May 1956, in a 3–1 friendly win against West Germany, he was given the nickname "Boom Boom" by the local press because of "the Big Bertha shot in his boots".

== Outside football ==
Edwards was teetotal, and outside football he was known as a very private individual, whose interests included fishing, playing cards and visiting the cinema. Although he attended dances with his teammates he was never confident in social surroundings. He was described by Jimmy Murphy as an "unspoilt boy" and retained a strong Black Country accent which his teammates would impersonate. He was once stopped by the police for riding his bicycle without lights and fined five shillings by the authorities and two weeks' wages by his club.

At the time of his death Edwards was living in lodgings in Gorse Avenue, Stretford. He was engaged to be married to Molly Leech, who was 22 years old and worked in the offices of a textile machine manufacturer in Altrincham. The couple met at a function at a hotel at Manchester Airport, dated for a year before becoming engaged, and were godparents to the daughter of Leech's friend Josephine Stott.

Edwards appeared in advertisements for Dextrosol glucose tablets and had written a book entitled Tackle Soccer This Way, commercial endeavours which supplemented his wage of £15 per week during the season and £12 per week during the summer. The book was published shortly after his death with the approval of his family and, after being out of print for many years, was re-published in November 2009.

== Career statistics ==
=== Club ===
Appearances and goals by club, season and competition
| Club | Season | Football League First Division | | FA Cup | | European Cup | | Charity Shield | | Total | |
| Club | Season | Apps | Goals | Apps | Goals | Apps | Goals | Apps | Goals | Apps | Goals |
|---|---|---|---|---|---|---|---|---|---|---|---|
| Manchester United | 1952–53 | 1 | 0 | 0 | 0 | 0 | 0 | 0 | 0 | 1 | 0 |
| Manchester United | 1953–54 | 24 | 0 | 1 | 0 | 0 | 0 | 0 | 0 | 25 | 0 |
| Manchester United | 1954–55 | 33 | 6 | 3 | 0 | 0 | 0 | 0 | 0 | 36 | 6 |
| Manchester United | 1955–56 | 33 | 3 | 0 | 0 | 0 | 0 | 0 | 0 | 33 | 3 |
| Manchester United | 1956–57 | 34 | 5 | 6 | 1 | 7 | 0 | 1 | 0 | 48 | 6 |
| Manchester United | 1957–58 | 26 | 6 | 2 | 0 | 5 | 0 | 1 | 0 | 34 | 6 |
| Career total | | 151 | 20 | 12 | 1 | 12 | 0 | 2 | 0 | 177 | 21 |

=== International ===
Appearances and goals by national team and year
| National team | Year | Apps | Goals |
|---|---|---|---|
| England | 1955 | 4 | 0 |
| England | 1956 | 7 | 3 |
| England | 1957 | 7 | 2 |
| Total | | 18 | 5 |

Scores and results list England's goal tally first, score column indicates score after each Edwards goal.

List of international goals scored by Duncan Edwards
| No. | Date | Venue | Opponent | Score | Result | Competition |
|---|---|---|---|---|---|---|
| 1 | 26 May 1956 | Olympic Stadium, Berlin, West Germany | West Germany | 1–0 | 3–1 | Friendly |
| 2 | 5 December 1956 | Molineux Ground, Wolverhampton, England | Denmark | 4–2 | 5–2 | 1958 World Cup qualifier |
| 3 | 5 December 1956 | Molineux Ground, Wolverhampton, England | Denmark | 5–2 | 5–2 | 1958 World Cup qualifier |
| 4 | 6 April 1957 | Wembley Stadium, London, England | Scotland | 2–1 | 2–1 | 1957 British Home Championship |
| 5 | 6 November 1957 | Wembley Stadium, London, England | Ireland | 2–3 | 2–3 | 1958 British Home Championship |

== Honours ==
Manchester United

- Football League First Division: 1955–56, 1956–57
- FA Charity Shield: 1956, 1957
- FA Cup runner-up: 1956–57

Individual

- Football League 100 Legends: 1998 (inducted)
- Inducted into the inaugural English Football Hall of Fame in 2002
- PFA Team of the Century (1907–1976): 2007
- UEFA Jubilee Poll (2004): #61
- Ballon d'Or 1957: 3rd place

== Bibliography ==
- Holt, Nick; Lloyd, Guy (2006). Total British Football. Flame Tree Publishing. ISBN 978-1-84451-403-8.
- Horne, John; Tomlinson, Alan; Whannel, Garry (1999). Understanding Sport: An Introduction to the Sociological and Cultural Analysis of Sport. Taylor & Francis. ISBN 978-0-419-13640-8.
- Leighton, James (2002). Duncan Edwards: The Greatest. London: Simon & Schuster UK. ISBN 978-0-85720-781-4.
- McCartney, Iain (2001). Duncan Edwards: The Full Report. Britespot Publishing Solutions. ISBN 978-0-9539288-5-9.
- Meek, David (2006). Legends of United: The Heroes of the Busby Years. Orion Books. ISBN 978-0-7528-7558-3.
- Wagg, Stephen (2004). Andrews, David L. (ed.). Manchester United: A Thematic Study. Routledge. ISBN 978-0-415-33333-7.
