= Frank Clempson =

English footballer and manager

Personal information
- Full name: Frank Clempson
- Date of birth: 27 May 1930
- Place of birth: Salford, England
- Date of death: 24 December 1970 (aged 40)
- Place of death: Worsley, England
- Height: 5 ft 8 in (1.73 m)
- Positions: Forward; wing half

Youth career
- Adelphi Boys Club
- 1948: Manchester United

Senior career*
| Years | Team | Apps | (Gls) |
| 1948–1953 | Manchester United | 15 | (2) |
| 1953–1959 | Stockport County | 246 | (35) |
| 1959–1961 | Chester | 67 | (8) |
| 1961–63 | Hyde United | 78 | (13) |

Managerial career
- 1961–63: Hyde United
- * Club domestic league appearances and goals

Frank Clempson (27 May 1930 – 24 December 1970) was an English professional footballer born in Salford who played in The Football League for three clubs. He was part of the Manchester United squad when they won the First Division title in 1951–52.

== Playing career ==
Clempson, who played as both a forward and a wing half, turned professional with Manchester United in September 1948. He made his debut for the club in 1950 against Sunderland and went on to make 15 league appearances for the club. Eight of these came in 1951–52, when United were champions of England.

In February 1953, Clempson moved to Stockport County, where he played regularly for six years. He was selected to play for the Third Division North representative side in 1954–55. In the summer of 1959, Clempson joined Chester, where his former Manchester United colleague Stan Pearson was manager. Clempson was installed as captain and played for two years before leaving to become player-manager of Hyde United. His signings included his Chester teammate, Billy Foulkes, who played for Newcastle United and Wales.

== Honours ==
Manchester United

- Football League First Division: 1951–52

== Bibliography ==
- Sumner, Chas (1997). On the Borderline: The Official History of Chester City F.C. 1885-1997. Yore Publications. ISBN 978-1-874427-52-0.
