= John Aston Sr. =

English footballer

Personal information
- Full name: John Aston
- Date of birth: 3 September 1921
- Place of birth: Prestwich, England
- Date of death: 31 July 2003 (aged 81)
- Place of death: Glossop, England
- Height: 5 ft 11 in (1.80 m)
- Positions: Left-back; centre-forward

Youth career
- Manchester United

Senior career*
Years	Team	Apps	(Gls)
1946–1954	Manchester United	253	(29)

International career
1948–1950	England	17	(0)
- * Club domestic league appearances and goals

John Aston (3 September 1921 – 31 July 2003) was an English footballer.

Like his son John Aston Jr., Prestwich-born Aston came through the Manchester United youth system and turned professional in December 1939. His debut for the club came almost seven years later, on 18 September 1946, against Chelsea. Aston was a strong, tough-tackling left-back who also played as a centre forward for his club on occasion. He won 17 England caps between 1948 and 1950, all at left-back, and featured in the 1950 FIFA World Cup. He played in the 1948 FA Cup Final triumph over Blackpool at Wembley Stadium. He was forced into retirement in 1954 after contracting tuberculosis, having scored 30 goals in 284 appearances for Manchester United. Because of the tuberculosis, he had to have a lung removed; he was offered treatment in Switzerland or North Wales, and chose the latter due to its proximity to home and family.

On 25th April 1956 a John Aston Testimonial Match was held with Manchester United playing an 'All Star' XI at Old Trafford.

Aston returned to the club as youth team coach in the early 1960s and was then chief scout under new manager Wilf McGuinness in 1969, and had a three-year spell in the position before being sacked along with McGuinness's successor, Frank O'Farrell in late 1972. Aston was also reserve team manager when McGuinness was manager, although McGuinness became reserve team manager again after he got sacked as manager in December 1970.

Aston died in July 2003 at the age of 81.

== Honours ==
Manchester United

- Football League First Division: 1951–52
- FA Cup: 1947–48
