= Johnny Downie =

Scottish footballer

Personal information
- Full name: John Dennis Downie
- Date of birth: 19 July 1925
- Place of birth: Lanark, Scotland
- Date of death: 19 February 2013 (aged 87)
- Place of death: Tynemouth, England
- Height: 1.75 m (5 ft 9 in)
- Position: Inside forward

Youth career
- Lanark ATC

Senior career*
Years	Team	Apps	(Gls)
1942–1949	Bradford Park Avenue	86	(33)
1949–1953	Manchester United	110	(35)
1953–1954	Luton Town	26	(12)
1954–1955	Hull City	27	(5)
1955–?	King's Lynn		
?–1958	Wisbech Town		
1958–1959	Mansfield Town	18	(4)
1959–1960	Darlington	15	(2)
1960–1961	Hyde United	36	(9)
1961	Mossley		
1961–1962	Stalybridge Celtic		
Total		282	(91)
- * Club domestic league appearances and goals

John Dennis Downie (19 July 1925 – 19 February 2013) was a Scottish footballer. He was born in Lanark, and played as an inside forward. Downie played football as a member of the Lanark Air Training Corps, but joined Bradford Park Avenue as an amateur in August 1942. After spending time working in a colliery in Bradford, he turned professional in December 1944, and made his debut when football restarted after the Second World War.

After 33 goals in 86 league appearances for Bradford Park Avenue, he joined Manchester United in March 1949 for a club record £18,000 as a replacement for the departing Johnny Morris. Downie scored 37 goals (including five in the FA Cup) in 116 appearances for the club, before leaving for Luton Town for £10,000 in 1953.

Downie also played league football for Hull City, Mansfield Town and Darlington, and spent time in the non-league with King's Lynn, Wisbech Town, Hyde United, Mossley and Stalybridge Celtic. After retiring from football, Downie worked as a newsagent in Bradford. He later lived in Tynemouth and regularly watched local teams North Shields and Whitley Bay, and also played snooker. He died in Tynemouth on 19 February 2013.
