= Johnny Berry =

English footballer (1926–1994)

Personal information
- Full name: Reginald John Berry
- Date of birth: 1 June 1926
- Place of birth: Aldershot, England
- Date of death: 16 September 1994 (aged 68)
- Place of death: Farnham, England
- Height: 5 ft 5 1/2 in (1.66 m)
- Position: Outside right

Youth career
- Aldershot YMCA

Senior career*
Years	Team	Apps	(Gls)
1946–1951	Birmingham City	104	(6)
1951–1958	Manchester United	247	(37)
Total		351	(43)

International career
1952	England B	1	(0)
1953–1956	England	4	(0)
- * Club domestic league appearances and goals

Reginald John Berry (1 June 1926 – 16 September 1994), also listed as John James Berry, was an English footballer. Berry joined Manchester United from Birmingham City in 1951. Despite his diminutive stature, he was a natural right winger with technique and pace. One of the Busby Babes, the February 1958 Munich air disaster brought his career to an end.

== Personal life ==
Berry was born in Aldershot, Hampshire, the son of Mary (née O'Connor) and Reginald Berry, a Sergeant in the Royal Horse Artillery; he lived with his family on Crimea Road in the town. As a boy, he played football for St Joseph's School in Aldershot and Aldershot YMCA, and on leaving school he worked as a projectionist for a local cinema. He tried to sign for Aldershot but was told he was too short. During service with the Royal Artillery in the Second World War, he was brought to the attention of Birmingham City and signed as a professional at St Andrews in 1944.

Berry died of cancer in a hospice in Farnham in Surrey at the age of 68 in September 1994 after a short illness and was buried in the Catholic section at Aldershot Cemetery. He was the first surviving player of the Munich air disaster to die.

Berry's grave in Aldershot Cemetery in 2019

Berry married Hilda Reeves at Aldershot in 1948. They had three sons; Neil (who was later the head teacher of Brampton Manor School), and twins Paul (born 1952) and Craig (1952–1995).

== Career ==
In 1951, Matt Busby paid Birmingham City £25,000 to bring Berry to Manchester United. Berry played 277 matches for Manchester United, scoring 44 goals along the way, including helping Manchester United win three league titles. He played regularly for the first six seasons, before losing his place in the starting XI to youngster Kenny Morgans.

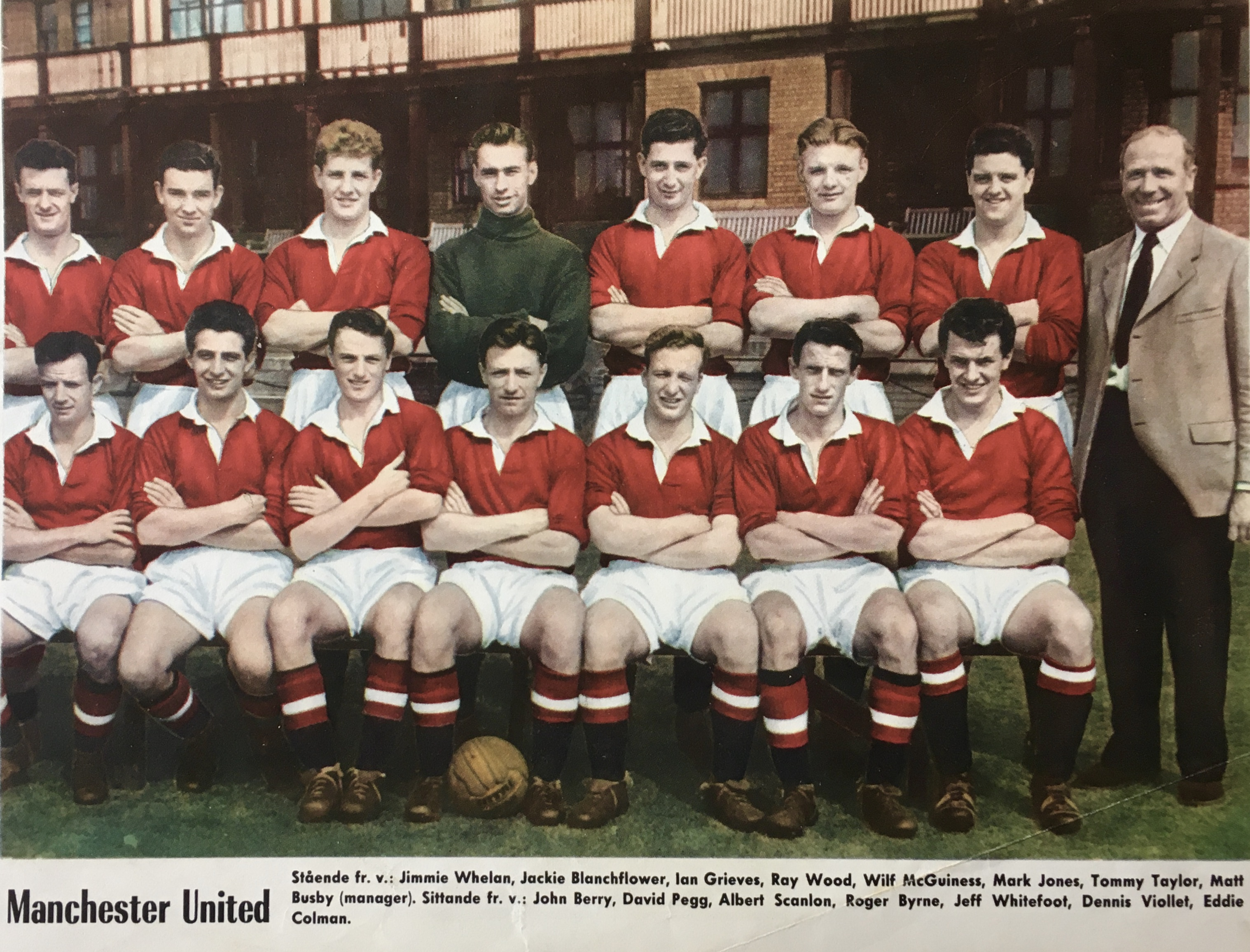
Berry (front row, far left) in a Manchester United team photo in 1957

Berry was also capped four times by England while playing for Manchester United, his chances of regular international action inevitably restricted by the form of Stanley Matthews and Tom Finney on the wing.

Injuries sustained in the Munich air disaster in February 1958 brought his footballing career to an end at the age of 31. When he woke up, he was totally unaware of the plane crash, his injuries having caused mild amnesia. A month after he regained consciousness, he found out about the crash from seeing a newspaper. He spent two months in hospital with a fractured skull, a broken jaw, a broken elbow, a broken pelvis, and a broken leg. All of his teeth had to be removed while treating his jaw injuries. He only found out which of his teammates had been killed some time after he returned to England. When still in hospital, he would complain to manager Matt Busby that his teammate Tommy Taylor was a poor friend for not visiting him, unaware that Taylor had died in the accident. Doctors treating Berry felt that he was not well enough to be told that any of his colleagues had died at the time.

His first job after retiring from football was with Massey Ferguson at Trafford Park, but in 1960 he was asked to leave the Manchester United-owned house to accommodate new signing Maurice Setters, and he left Manchester to return to Aldershot. He later ran a sports business with his younger brother Peter in Cove, a village near Aldershot, until the 1980s. Peter was also a professional footballer, most notably with Crystal Palace. They also ran the Berry Brothers sports shop at Queensmead in Farnborough. Johnny Berry spent the final years of his working life as a storeman in a local television warehouse.

== Depiction in media ==
Neil Berry published a book in 2007, The Forgotten Babe, describing his father's years at Manchester United.

== Honours ==
Manchester United

- Football League First Division: 1951–52, 1955–56, 1956–57
- FA Charity Shield: 1952, 1956, 1957
- FA Cup runner-up: 1956–57
