= Don Gibson (footballer, born 1929) =

English footballer (1929–2024)

Personal information
- Full name: Thomas Richard Donald Gibson
- Date of birth: 12 May 1929
- Place of birth: Manchester, England
- Date of death: 16 September 2024 (aged 95)
- Position: Right half

Youth career
- Manchester United

Senior career*
Years	Team	Apps	(Gls)
1946–1955	Manchester United	108	(0)
1955–1959	Sheffield Wednesday	80	(2)
1959–1960	Leyton Orient	8	(0)
Total		196	(2)
- * Club domestic league appearances and goals

Thomas Richard Donald Gibson (12 May 1929 – 16 September 2024) was an English footballer who played at right half in the Football League for Manchester United, Sheffield Wednesday and Leyton Orient.

Born in Manchester, Gibson joined Manchester United in 1946 as an amateur, turned professional the following year, and made his first-team debut in the First Division on 26 August 1950 against Bolton Wanderers. In the 1952–53 season, he lost his regular first-team place to Johnny Carey, who was moved to right half-back after Tommy McNulty was introduced at right back. He left United for Sheffield Wednesday in 1955 on an £8,000 transfer, after making 115 appearances without scoring. He later moved to Leyton Orient.

Gibson was the son-in-law of former Manchester United manager Sir Matt Busby, having been married to his daughter Sheena for 59 years until her death in May 2015 at the age of 78. They had three daughters. Gibson died on 16 September 2024, at the age of 95.
