= Henry Cockburn (footballer) =

English footballer (1921–2004)

Personal information
- Full name: Henry Cockburn
- Date of birth: 14 September 1921
- Place of birth: Ashton-under-Lyne, Lancashire, England
- Date of death: 2 February 2004 (aged 82)
- Place of death: Mossley, England
- Height: 5 ft 5 in (1.65 m)
- Position: Left half

Senior career*
Years	Team	Apps	(Gls)
1944–1954	Manchester United	243	(4)
1944–1945	→ Accrington Stanley (guest)		
1954–1956	Bury	35	(0)
1956–1958	Peterborough United	39	(1)
1959–1960	Corby Town		
1960–1961	Sankey's		

International career
1946–1951	England	13	(0)
- * Club domestic league appearances and goals

Henry Cockburn (14 September 1921 – 2 February 2004) was an English professional footballer, who played league football for Manchester United, Bury and Peterborough United. He represented England at international level, playing 13 times for his country. He also played once for the England B team.

Born in Ashton-under-Lyne, Lancashire, Cockburn attended Stamford High School and began his football career as a forward with Goslings FC in the early 1940s. He joined Manchester United in 1943, turning professional in August 1944. However, because of the Second World War, he had to wait until 1946 for his league debut, by which time he had been converted into a wing half. He also made his England debut against Northern Ireland that year.

With United, Cockburn won the 1948 FA Cup and the 1952 league title. He left United in October 1954, joining Bury where he ended his league career after two seasons. He subsequently played for Peterborough United, Corby Town and Sankey's.

After retiring as a player, Cockburn later worked as assistant trainer at Oldham Athletic and assistant and then senior coach at Huddersfield Town. It was whilst at Huddersfield Town in the 1960s that Henry was to be a major influence on future Wolves record appearance maker, Derek Parkin.

During the 1960s, Cockburn played cricket for Ashton Cricket Club, usually fielding at cover.

== Honours ==
Manchester United

- FA Cup: 1947–48
