= Thomas McNulty (footballer) =

English footballer (1929–1979)

Personal information
- Date of birth: 30 December 1929
- Place of birth: Salford, England
- Date of death: 1979 (aged 49–50)
- Height: 5 ft 9 in (1.75 m)
- Position: Defender

Youth career
- 1946–1949: Manchester United

Senior career*
| Years | Team | Apps | (Gls) |
| 1949–1954 | Manchester United | 57 | (0) |
| 1954–1958 | Liverpool | 36 | (0) |
| Total | | 93 | (0) |
- * Club domestic league appearances and goals

Thomas McNulty (30 December 1929 – April 1979) was an English footballer. He was born in Salford, Greater Manchester.

McNulty started his senior career with Manchester United in 1949 and made his debut with the senior team in a home fixture against Portsmouth on 15 April 1950. He helped United win the 1951–52 league championship. He left the club for Liverpool in 1954 for a transfer fee of £7,000 after having made 59 appearances in seven years for United.

== Honours ==
Manchester United

- First Division: 1951–52
