= 1951–52 Football League =

53rd season of the Football League

The Football League
- Season: 1951–52
- Champions: Manchester United
- New club in League: Workington

The 1951–52 season was the 53rd completed season of The Football League.

== Final league tables ==
The tables below are reproduced here in the exact form that they can be found at The Rec.Sport.Soccer Statistics Foundation website and in Rothmans Book of Football League Records 1888–89 to 1978–79, with home and away statistics separated.

Beginning with the 1894-95 season, clubs finishing level on points were separated according to goal average (goals scored divided by goals conceded), specifically, goals scored divided by goals conceded. Because this metric favoured teams that score fewer goals when goal differences were identical, the goal average system was eventually replaced ahead of the 1976-77 season.

From the 1922–23 season, the bottom two teams of both Third Division North and Third Division South were required to apply for re-election.

== First Division ==
First Division
- Season: 1951–52
- Champions: Manchester United; 3rd English title
- Relegated: Huddersfield Town; Fulham
- Matches: 462
- Goals: 1,490 (3.23 per match)
- Top goalscorer: George Robledo (33 goals)
- Biggest home win: Newcastle United 6–0 Stoke City (18 August 1951); Newcastle United 7–1 Burnley (15 September 1951); Burnley 7–1 Middlesbrough (29 December 1951); Fulham 6–0 Middlesbrough (19 January 1952); Newcastle United 6–0 Charlton Athletic (26 January 1952); Sunderland 7–1 Huddersfield Town (11 April 1952); Aston Villa 7–1 Chelsea (15 April 1952)
- Biggest away win: Huddersfield Town 1–7 Wolverhampton Wanderers (29 September 1951)
- Highest scoring: Newcastle United 7–2 Tottenham Hotspur (1 September 1951); Arsenal 6–3 West Bromwich Albion (10 November 1951); Blackpool 6–3 Newcastle United (10 November 1951); Stoke City 4–5 Newcastle United (15 December 1951)

After the title disappointments of the previous five seasons, Manchester United finally ended their 41-year wait for the First Division title, finishing four points ahead of their nearest rivals, Tottenham Hotspur and Arsenal.

Huddersfield Town and Fulham were relegated to the Second Division.

Pos	Team	Pld	W	D	L	GF	GA	GAv	Pts	Relegation
1	Manchester United (C)	42	23	11	8	95	52	1.827	57	
2	Tottenham Hotspur	42	22	9	11	76	51	1.490	53	
3	Arsenal	42	21	11	10	80	61	1.311	53	
4	Portsmouth	42	20	8	14	68	58	1.172	48	
5	Bolton Wanderers	42	19	10	13	65	61	1.066	48	
6	Aston Villa	42	19	9	14	79	70	1.129	47	
7	Preston North End	42	17	12	13	74	54	1.370	46	
8	Newcastle United	42	18	9	15	98	73	1.342	45	
9	Blackpool	42	18	9	15	64	64	1.000	45	
10	Charlton Athletic	42	17	10	15	68	63	1.079	44	
11	Liverpool	42	12	19	11	57	61	0.934	43	
12	Sunderland	42	15	12	15	70	61	1.148	42	
13	West Bromwich Albion	42	14	13	15	74	77	0.961	41	
14	Burnley	42	15	10	17	56	63	0.889	40	
15	Manchester City	42	13	13	16	58	61	0.951	39	
16	Wolverhampton Wanderers	42	12	14	16	73	73	1.000	38	
17	Derby County	42	15	7	20	63	80	0.788	37	
18	Middlesbrough	42	15	6	21	64	88	0.727	36	
19	Chelsea	42	14	8	20	52	72	0.722	36	
20	Stoke City	42	12	7	23	49	88	0.557	31	
21	Huddersfield Town (R)	42	10	8	24	49	82	0.598	28	Relegation to the Second Division
22	Fulham (R)	42	8	11	23	58	77	0.753	27	Relegation to the Second Division

Source: World Football
Rules for classification: 1) Points; 2) Goal average; 3) Goals scored
(C) Champions; (R) Relegated

=== Results ===
Home \ Away	ARS	AST	BLP	BOL	BUR	CHA	CHE	DER	FUL	HUD	LIV	MCI	MUN	MID	NEW	POR	PNE	STK	SUN	TOT	WBA	WOL
Arsenal		2–1	4–1	4–2	1–0	2–1	2–1	3–1	4–3	2–2	0–0	2–2	1–3	3–1	1–1	4–1	3–3	4–1	3–0	1–1	6–3	2–2
Aston Villa	1–0		4–0	1–1	4–1	0–2	7–1	4–1	4–1	1–0	2–0	1–2	2–5	2–0	2–2	2–0	3–2	2–3	2–1	0–3	2–0	3–3
Blackpool	0–0	0–3		1–0	1–0	1–2	1–2	2–1	4–2	3–1	2–0	2–2	2–2	2–2	6–3	0–0	0–3	4–2	3–0	1–0	2–0	3–2
Bolton Wanderers	2–1	5–2	1–0		1–4	2–1	3–0	1–2	2–1	2–1	1–1	2–1	1–0	3–1	0–0	0–3	1–1	1–1	1–1	1–1	3–2	2–2
Burnley	0–1	2–1	2–0	1–3		1–0	1–1	0–1	1–0	0–2	0–0	0–0	1–1	7–1	2–1	1–0	0–2	4–0	0–1	1–1	6–1	2–2
Charlton Athletic	1–3	0–1	2–0	1–0	1–0		1–1	3–3	3–0	4–0	2–0	0–0	2–2	4–3	3–0	0–2	4–2	4–0	2–1	0–3	3–3	1–0
Chelsea	1–3	2–2	2–1	1–3	4–1	1–0		0–1	2–1	2–1	1–3	0–3	4–2	5–0	1–0	1–1	0–0	1–0	2–1	0–2	1–3	0–1
Derby County	1–2	1–1	1–1	5–2	1–0	1–3	1–1		5–0	2–1	1–1	1–3	0–3	3–1	1–3	1–0	4–3	4–2	3–4	4–2	2–1	1–3
Fulham	0–0	2–2	1–2	1–2	1–2	3–3	1–2	3–0		1–0	1–1	1–2	3–3	6–0	1–1	2–3	2–3	5–0	0–1	1–2	1–0	2–2
Huddersfield Town	2–3	3–1	1–3	0–2	1–3	1–0	1–0	1–1	1–0		1–2	5–1	3–2	1–0	2–4	0–1	2–0	0–2	2–2	1–1	3–0	1–7
Liverpool	0–0	1–2	1–1	1–1	3–1	1–1	1–1	2–0	4–0	2–1		1–2	0–0	1–1	3–0	0–2	2–2	2–1	2–2	1–1	2–5	1–1
Manchester City	0–2	2–2	0–0	0–3	0–1	4–2	3–1	4–2	1–1	3–0	1–2		1–2	2–1	2–3	0–1	1–0	0–1	3–1	1–1	1–2	0–0
Manchester United	6–1	1–1	3–1	1–0	6–1	3–2	3–0	2–1	3–2	1–1	4–0	1–1		4–2	2–1	1–3	1–2	4–0	0–1	2–0	5–1	2–0
Middlesbrough	0–3	2–0	1–0	2–0	5–0	2–1	0–0	0–0	2–0	2–1	3–3	2–2	1–4		2–1	2–1	2–5	3–0	0–2	2–1	0–1	4–0
Newcastle United	2–0	6–1	1–3	0–1	7–1	6–0	3–1	2–1	0–1	6–2	1–1	1–0	2–2	0–2		3–3	3–0	6–0	2–2	7–2	1–4	3–1
Portsmouth	1–1	2–0	1–3	3–0	2–2	1–0	1–0	3–1	4–0	3–1	1–3	1–0	1–0	5–4	3–1		1–2	4–1	0–2	2–0	1–1	2–3
Preston North End	2–0	2–2	3–1	2–2	1–2	3–0	1–0	0–1	0–1	5–2	4–0	1–1	1–2	0–1	1–2	2–2		2–0	4–2	1–1	1–0	3–0
Stoke City	2–1	4–1	2–3	1–2	2–1	1–2	1–2	3–1	1–1	0–0	1–2	3–1	0–0	3–2	4–5	2–0	0–0		1–1	1–6	1–1	1–0
Sunderland	4–1	1–3	1–3	0–2	0–0	1–1	4–1	3–0	2–2	7–1	3–0	3–0	1–2	3–1	1–4	3–1	0–0	0–1		0–1	3–3	1–1
Tottenham Hotspur	1–2	2–0	2–0	2–1	1–1	2–3	3–2	5–0	1–0	1–0	2–3	1–2	2–0	3–1	2–1	3–1	1–0	2–0	2–0		3–1	4–2
West Bromwich Albion	3–1	1–2	1–1	3–2	1–1	1–1	0–1	1–0	0–2	0–0	3–3	3–2	3–3	2–3	3–3	5–0	1–1	1–0	1–1	3–1		2–1
Wolverhampton Wanderers	2–1	1–2	3–0	5–1	1–2	2–2	5–3	1–2	2–2	0–0	2–1	2–2	0–2	4–0	3–0	1–1	1–4	3–0	0–3	1–1	1–4	

Updated to match(es) played on unknown. Source: Ian Laschke: Rothmans Book of Football League Records 1888–89 to 1978–79. Macdonald and Jane’s, London & Sydney, 1980.
Legend: Blue = home team win; Yellow = draw; Red = away team win.

=== Maps ===
Locations of the Football League First Division London teams 1950–1951
Locations of the Football League First Division 1951–1952 teams

== Second Division ==
Second Division
- Season: 1951–52
- Champions: Sheffield Wednesday
- Promoted: Sheffield Wednesday; Cardiff City
- Relegated: Coventry City; Queens Park Rangers
- Matches: 462
- Goals: 1,488 (3.22 per match)
- Top goalscorer: Derek Dooley (46 goals)

Sheffield Wednesday were champions of the Second Division scoring exactly 100 goals in the process. After a weak start winning only three of their first eleven matches and losing 7-3 to rivals Sheffield United in September, the team found their feet and lost only one of their fourteen last matches. Cardiff City finished second on equal points with Birmingham City and were promoted thanks to a better goal average.

Pos	Team	Pld	W	D	L	GF	GA	GAv	Pts	Qualification or relegation
1	Sheffield Wednesday (C, P)	42	21	11	10	100	66	1.515	53	Promotion to the First Division
2	Cardiff City (P)	42	20	11	11	72	54	1.333	51	Promotion to the First Division
3	Birmingham City	42	21	9	12	67	56	1.196	51	
4	Nottingham Forest	42	18	13	11	77	62	1.242	49	
5	Leicester City	42	19	9	14	78	64	1.219	47	
6	Leeds United	42	18	11	13	59	57	1.035	47	
7	Everton	42	17	10	15	64	58	1.103	44	
8	Luton Town	42	16	12	14	77	78	0.987	44	
9	Rotherham United	42	17	8	17	73	71	1.028	42	
10	Brentford	42	15	12	15	54	55	0.982	42	
11	Sheffield United	42	18	5	19	90	76	1.184	41	
12	West Ham United	42	15	11	16	67	77	0.870	41	
13	Southampton	42	15	11	16	61	73	0.836	41	
14	Blackburn Rovers	42	17	6	19	54	63	0.857	40	
15	Notts County	42	16	7	19	71	68	1.044	39	
16	Doncaster Rovers	42	13	12	17	55	60	0.917	38	
17	Bury	42	15	7	20	67	69	0.971	37	
18	Hull City	42	13	11	18	60	70	0.857	37	
19	Swansea Town	42	12	12	18	72	76	0.947	36	
20	Barnsley	42	11	14	17	59	72	0.819	36	
21	Coventry City (R)	42	14	6	22	59	82	0.720	34	Relegation to the Third Division South
22	Queens Park Rangers (R)	42	11	12	19	52	81	0.642	34	Relegation to the Third Division South

Rules for classification: 1) Points; 2) Goal average; 3) Goals scored
(C) Champions; (P) Promoted; (R) Relegated

=== Results ===
Home \ Away	BAR	BIR	BLB	BRE	BRY	CAR	COV	DON	EVE	HUL	LEE	LEI	LUT	NOT	NTC	QPR	ROT	SHU	SHW	SOU	SWA	WHU
Barnsley		1–2	1–2	0–0	3–3	2–0	1–0	1–1	1–0	2–2	3–1	3–3	1–2	1–1	2–1	3–1	0–1	3–4	5–4	3–1	2–3	1–1
Birmingham	2–1		0–1	1–2	2–1	3–2	3–1	2–2	1–2	2–2	1–1	2–0	3–1	0–2	2–0	1–0	4–0	3–0	0–0	1–1	1–1	2–1
Blackburn Rovers	2–1	1–4		3–0	1–2	0–1	0–1	3–3	1–0	1–0	2–3	2–1	2–1	3–2	2–0	4–2	1–1	1–5	0–0	0–1	3–1	3–1
Brentford	1–1	1–0	1–1		4–0	1–1	1–0	1–0	1–0	2–1	2–1	1–3	3–3	1–1	1–0	0–0	2–0	4–1	2–3	1–2	3–1	1–1
Bury	3–0	3–0	0–2	1–0		1–1	0–2	1–1	1–0	3–1	1–2	1–4	0–1	2–0	2–1	3–1	3–1	1–0	1–2	8–2	4–1	4–0
Cardiff City	3–0	3–1	3–1	2–0	3–0		4–1	2–1	3–1	1–0	3–1	4–0	3–0	4–1	1–0	3–1	2–4	1–1	2–1	1–0	3–0	1–1
Coventry City	0–0	1–1	1–2	2–1	3–0	2–1		1–2	2–1	1–4	4–2	1–3	5–2	3–3	0–2	0–0	2–1	1–1	0–2	3–1	3–2	1–2
Doncaster Rovers	1–2	0–5	1–0	1–2	1–1	1–0	1–0		3–1	0–1	2–0	2–2	1–1	0–1	1–5	4–0	0–3	2–1	1–1	0–1	3–0	4–1
Everton	1–1	1–3	0–2	1–0	2–2	3–0	4–1	1–1		5–0	2–0	2–0	1–3	1–0	1–5	3–0	3–3	1–0	3–3	3–0	2–1	2–0
Hull City	0–0	0–1	3–0	4–1	5–0	0–0	5–0	2–0	1–0		3–2	3–1	1–2	1–4	1–3	4–1	3–3	2–1	0–1	0–0	5–2	1–1
Leeds United	1–0	1–1	1–0	1–1	2–1	2–1	3–1	0–0	1–2	2–0		2–1	1–1	0–0	1–0	3–0	3–0	3–1	3–2	1–1	1–1	3–1
Leicester City	1–2	4–0	2–1	1–1	1–1	3–0	3–1	2–1	1–2	1–0	1–2		3–3	3–1	1–1	4–0	2–0	5–5	3–1	3–0	1–1	3–1
Luton Town	4–2	2–4	1–1	0–2	2–1	2–2	2–1	1–4	1–1	1–1	2–1	1–2		3–3	6–0	0–1	1–1	2–1	5–3	2–1	2–2	6–1
Nottingham Forest	3–3	0–1	1–0	2–0	1–0	2–3	3–1	1–1	2–0	4–0	1–1	2–2	2–0		3–2	3–1	4–2	0–2	2–1	3–0	2–2	0–0
Notts County	4–0	5–0	0–1	5–2	2–1	1–1	2–1	1–0	0–0	4–0	1–2	2–3	5–4	2–2		0–0	0–3	3–1	2–2	3–4	2–0	1–0
Queens Park Rangers	1–1	0–2	2–1	3–1	3–2	1–1	1–4	0–2	4–4	1–1	0–0	1–0	0–0	4–3	1–4		2–3	4–2	2–2	2–1	1–1	2–0
Rotherham United	4–0	1–2	3–0	1–1	4–3	2–0	0–1	2–0	1–1	1–1	4–2	0–2	0–1	1–2	2–0	1–0		3–1	3–3	4–1	1–3	2–1
Sheffield United	1–2	4–2	1–1	1–4	1–0	6–1	1–2	2–1	1–2	4–1	3–0	5–0	3–0	1–4	1–0	1–2	1–0		7–3	2–2	5–0	6–1
Sheffield Wednesday	2–1	1–1	2–0	2–0	2–1	4–2	3–1	3–1	4–0	6–0	1–2	1–0	4–0	1–1	6–0	2–1	3–5	1–3		3–1	1–1	2–2
Southampton	1–1	2–0	2–1	2–1	4–2	1–1	2–2	2–0	1–0	1–1	0–0	2–0	2–3	5–2	4–0	1–1	3–1	0–1	1–4		3–2	1–2
Swansea Town	2–1	4–0	5–1	1–1	0–2	1–1	7–1	1–2	0–2	3–0	4–1	1–0	0–3	1–2	1–1	2–3	5–0	3–1	1–2	1–1		2–1
West Ham United	2–1	0–1	3–1	1–0	1–1	1–1	3–1	3–3	3–3	2–0	2–0	2–3	3–0	3–1	2–1	4–2	2–1	5–1	0–6	4–0	2–2	

Updated to match(es) played on unknown. Source: Ian Laschke: Rothmans Book of Football League Records 1888–89 to 1978–79. Macdonald and Jane’s, London & Sydney, 1980.
Legend: Blue = home team win; Yellow = draw; Red = away team win.

=== Maps ===
Locations of the Football League Second Division London teams 1950–1951
Locations of the Football League Second Division 1951–1952 teams

== Third Division North ==
Football League Third Division North
- Season: 1951–52
- Champions: Lincoln City (3rd title)
- Failed re-election: none
- New club in League: Workington
- Matches: 552
- Goals: 1,658 (3 per match)
- Top goalscorer: Andy Graver (Lincoln City), 36

Pos	Team	Pld	W	D	L	GF	GA	GAv	Pts	Promotion
1	Lincoln City (C, P)	46	30	9	7	121	52	2.327	69	Promotion to the Second Division
2	Grimsby Town	46	29	8	9	96	45	2.133	66	
3	Stockport County	46	23	13	10	74	40	1.850	59	
4	Oldham Athletic	46	24	9	13	90	61	1.475	57	
5	Gateshead	46	21	11	14	66	49	1.347	53	
6	Mansfield Town	46	22	8	16	73	60	1.217	52	
7	Carlisle United	46	19	13	14	62	57	1.088	51	
8	Bradford (Park Avenue)	46	19	12	15	74	64	1.156	50	
9	Hartlepools United	46	21	8	17	71	65	1.092	50	
10	York City	46	18	13	15	73	52	1.404	49	
11	Tranmere Rovers	46	21	6	19	76	71	1.070	48	
12	Barrow	46	17	12	17	57	61	0.934	46	
13	Chesterfield	46	17	11	18	65	66	0.985	45	
14	Scunthorpe & Lindsey United	46	14	16	16	65	74	0.878	44	
15	Bradford City	46	16	10	20	61	68	0.897	42	
16	Crewe Alexandra	46	17	8	21	63	82	0.768	42	
17	Southport	46	15	11	20	53	71	0.746	41	
18	Wrexham	46	15	9	22	63	73	0.863	39	
19	Chester	46	15	9	22	72	85	0.847	39	
20	Halifax Town	46	14	7	25	61	97	0.629	35	
21	Rochdale	46	11	13	22	47	79	0.595	35	
22	Accrington Stanley	46	10	12	24	61	92	0.663	32	
23	Darlington	46	11	9	26	64	103	0.621	31	Re-elected
24	Workington	46	11	7	28	50	91	0.549	29	Re-elected

Source: rsssf.com
(C) Champions; (P) Promoted

=== Results ===
Home \ Away	ACC	BRW	BRA	BPA	CRL	CHE	CHF	CRE	DAR	GAT	GRI	HAL	HAR	LIN	MAN	OLD	ROC	SCU	SOU	STP	TRA	WRK	WRE	YOR
Accrington Stanley		1–1	0–1	5–1	0–2	4–2	2–0	2–3	1–3	1–2	0–3	2–2	0–0	1–3	1–0	1–2	0–0	2–2	0–0	0–3	1–1	0–0	4–2	2–1
Barrow	3–1		1–0	0–2	0–1	1–0	2–0	2–1	2–2	2–1	3–1	0–0	2–1	1–2	1–1	0–1	4–0	2–1	0–0	1–3	2–0	1–0	3–1	0–0
Bradford City	1–3	2–2		2–2	1–2	1–0	1–0	0–2	3–1	1–1	0–2	3–2	0–2	1–1	2–1	5–2	3–0	1–0	2–1	2–3	2–0	1–0	3–2	3–3
Bradford Park Avenue	1–1	3–1	2–1		0–1	3–0	3–3	3–2	2–0	2–0	3–2	6–1	1–2	1–1	0–1	1–0	1–1	2–2	2–2	4–2	2–3	2–1	5–0	2–1
Carlisle United	4–1	0–1	1–0	1–0		0–0	2–3	2–0	1–1	0–0	1–2	2–2	2–1	1–4	0–0	3–3	1–1	3–0	0–2	2–1	1–0	0–1	2–0	2–1
Chester	3–1	0–0	1–0	4–2	4–2		3–0	2–0	2–0	0–3	0–3	5–1	3–3	0–1	1–5	1–2	4–0	3–1	2–1	0–0	4–1	2–2	2–1	0–1
Chesterfield	2–0	2–0	2–2	0–0	3–0	2–0		0–0	4–2	1–0	3–1	3–1	2–2	2–2	1–1	1–0	5–1	3–0	2–0	0–1	1–1	3–1	3–0	2–1
Crewe Alexandra	3–3	1–1	0–1	3–4	1–1	1–2	2–1		3–0	4–2	1–2	4–1	4–2	0–2	1–0	3–1	1–0	2–2	1–0	1–0	2–1	2–0	2–2	0–0
Darlington	4–5	1–2	3–1	3–0	1–2	1–1	3–0	0–1		3–2	0–2	0–2	2–1	1–1	2–1	2–2	2–1	2–3	1–1	1–2	2–2	2–1	2–1	1–0
Gateshead	1–0	2–0	2–2	0–1	1–1	1–0	1–1	1–0	2–2		1–1	3–0	2–0	3–1	4–1	1–0	1–0	2–1	3–0	0–2	4–1	4–1	1–1	1–1
Grimsby Town	2–1	1–0	2–1	3–0	4–1	2–1	2–0	0–1	3–0	2–0		8–1	2–0	2–3	1–1	3–1	4–0	3–2	4–1	4–0	1–0	5–0	1–0	0–0
Halifax Town	0–4	0–1	1–1	0–0	1–2	4–1	0–0	2–3	4–1	0–1	3–0		2–0	1–3	1–0	1–0	1–0	2–1	0–1	1–2	1–0	3–1	2–0	1–1
Hartlepool	4–2	3–1	2–1	2–1	1–0	2–1	4–1	3–0	2–0	1–0	2–1	6–1		1–1	2–0	1–1	1–1	3–1	3–1	0–1	0–1	0–1	1–0	3–2
Lincoln City	2–2	3–0	2–1	2–0	2–2	4–1	5–1	11–1	7–2	1–0	0–2	4–1	4–3		1–2	4–0	2–0	4–1	4–0	2–1	3–0	7–0	3–2	3–1
Mansfield Town	3–0	2–1	2–1	1–0	1–2	3–1	2–1	2–1	3–2	2–3	2–2	4–2	0–1	1–0		2–1	1–1	4–1	4–0	1–0	3–0	3–2	3–0	1–1
Oldham Athletic	3–1	3–1	2–1	1–2	2–0	11–2	3–0	5–2	3–2	2–0	1–1	2–0	5–2	4–1	5–3		1–1	2–0	2–1	1–0	3–0	0–1	2–1	2–0
Rochdale	3–1	4–1	1–1	1–1	0–4	0–5	2–0	1–0	6–2	0–3	0–0	0–2	3–0	0–1	1–0	2–2		1–2	1–0	0–0	3–2	2–0	1–5	0–2
Scunthorpe & Lindsey United	3–1	0–0	1–0	0–0	1–1	2–2	1–1	2–0	5–2	1–1	1–3	2–1	2–0	1–3	4–1	2–2	3–1		1–1	1–1	2–0	3–1	0–0	1–1
Southport	0–0	2–2	1–1	0–0	2–1	1–0	4–1	1–1	3–0	0–2	2–0	3–2	2–0	0–3	0–1	0–0	1–2	5–1		0–1	1–0	4–2	2–1	2–1
Stockport County	6–0	2–2	1–2	1–0	1–1	0–0	2–1	4–2	5–0	0–0	1–1	6–2	0–1	1–1	2–1	0–0	1–0	1–1	3–1		2–0	5–0	0–0	3–1
Tranmere	3–1	3–1	3–1	1–2	3–2	3–1	2–0	1–0	3–0	5–1	2–3	1–2	4–1	2–2	1–1	0–4	4–3	3–1	5–1	2–0		3–1	3–1	2–0
Workington	0–2	3–1	0–1	2–3	1–2	2–2	3–1	3–1	2–1	1–2	2–4	2–1	1–1	0–3	0–1	0–1	1–1	0–0	6–1	0–3	1–2		2–0	1–0
Wrexham	1–0	2–4	3–0	3–2	3–1	3–2	0–3	4–0	1–1	2–1	2–0	2–1	0–0	4–2	3–1	1–0	2–0	1–2	3–0	0–0	0–1	0–0		1–1
York City	6–1	2–1	3–1	1–0	0–0	4–2	1–0	3–0	2–1	1–0	1–1	6–2	3–1	1–0	3–0	5–0	1–1	0–1	0–2	0–1	1–1	5–1	4–2	

Updated to match(es) played on unknown. Source: Ian Laschke: Rothmans Book of Football League Records 1888–89 to 1978–79. Macdonald and Jane’s, London & Sydney, 1980.
Legend: Blue = home team win; Yellow = draw; Red = away team win.

=== Maps ===
Locations of the Football League Third Division North teams 1951–1952

== Third Division South ==
Football League Third Division South
- Season: 1951–52
- Champions: Plymouth Argyle (2nd title)
- Failed re-election: none
- Matches: 552
- Goals: 1,740 (3.15 per match)
- Top goalscorer: Ronnie Blackman (Reading), 39

Pos	Team	Pld	W	D	L	GF	GA	GAv	Pts	Promotion
1	Plymouth Argyle (C, P)	46	29	8	9	107	53	2.019	66	Promotion to the Second Division
2	Reading	46	29	3	14	112	60	1.867	61	
3	Norwich City	46	26	9	11	89	50	1.780	61	
4	Millwall	46	23	12	11	74	53	1.396	58	
5	Brighton & Hove Albion	46	24	10	12	87	63	1.381	58	
6	Newport County	46	21	12	13	77	76	1.013	54	
7	Bristol Rovers	46	20	12	14	89	53	1.679	52	
8	Northampton Town	46	22	5	19	93	74	1.257	49	
9	Southend United	46	19	10	17	75	66	1.136	48	
10	Colchester United	46	17	12	17	56	77	0.727	46	
11	Torquay United	46	17	10	19	86	98	0.878	44	
12	Aldershot	46	18	8	20	78	89	0.876	44	
13	Port Vale	46	14	15	17	50	66	0.758	43	Transferred to the Third Division North
14	Bournemouth & Boscombe Athletic	46	16	10	20	69	75	0.920	42	
15	Bristol City	46	15	12	19	58	69	0.841	42	
16	Swindon Town	46	14	14	18	51	68	0.750	42	
17	Ipswich Town	46	16	9	21	63	74	0.851	41	
18	Leyton Orient	46	16	9	21	55	68	0.809	41	
19	Crystal Palace	46	15	9	22	61	80	0.763	39	
20	Shrewsbury Town	46	13	10	23	62	86	0.721	36	
21	Watford	46	13	10	23	57	81	0.704	36	
22	Gillingham	46	11	13	22	71	81	0.877	35	
23	Exeter City	46	13	9	24	65	86	0.756	35	Re-elected
24	Walsall	46	13	5	28	55	94	0.585	31	Re-elected

(C) Champions; (P) Promoted

=== Results ===
Home \ Away	ALD	B&BA	B&HA	BRI	BRR	COL	CRY	EXE	GIL	IPS	LEY	MIL	NPC	NOR	NWC	PLY	PTV	REA	SHR	STD	SWI	TOR	WAL	WAT
Aldershot		1–3	0–2	1–0	1–3	1–1	3–0	4–1	2–1	1–1	0–1	2–1	4–0	0–1	2–0	1–2	4–1	0–2	1–1	2–2	4–0	1–3	3–1	2–0
Bournemouth & Boscombe Athletic	0–2		3–1	0–0	1–0	5–0	1–2	0–4	3–3	2–2	3–2	0–2	5–1	3–0	1–2	1–2	0–1	1–2	2–0	2–1	4–1	3–1	2–1	0–0
Brighton & Hove Albion	4–2	0–1		1–1	1–1	5–1	4–3	2–1	0–0	5–1	3–1	0–0	1–2	2–0	2–0	2–3	2–1	1–0	1–0	5–0	4–0	3–4	5–1	4–1
Bristol City	1–1	1–0	4–1		1–1	2–0	2–0	1–1	3–2	0–2	1–1	2–1	3–1	2–0	2–5	1–1	1–0	1–3	3–0	6–0	2–1	2–2	2–0	1–3
Bristol Rovers	5–1	1–2	5–0	2–0		6–0	4–0	2–2	5–0	1–0	1–0	2–1	1–1	2–2	1–1	1–2	4–1	1–2	3–3	2–0	1–0	5–0	5–1	0–1
Colchester United	0–2	1–1	0–0	4–1	2–1		1–2	1–0	1–0	1–0	0–1	2–2	2–1	2–5	1–1	1–0	0–0	4–1	2–2	1–0	2–0	0–0	3–2	1–0
Crystal Palace	0–2	2–2	1–2	2–1	0–1	2–2		2–1	0–2	3–1	2–1	1–1	1–1	3–3	2–0	0–1	3–1	1–2	1–1	1–0	0–1	1–1	2–1	2–0
Exeter City	0–4	2–2	2–0	0–0	0–1	0–0	0–1		4–2	2–1	6–1	0–3	3–4	0–3	2–4	1–0	2–0	1–4	4–2	2–2	1–2	4–0	1–0	3–0
Gillingham	3–3	0–2	2–3	5–0	2–1	1–2	4–4	2–1		1–1	1–1	1–1	2–3	2–1	1–2	1–2	4–2	1–1	0–0	2–0	4–0	3–0	4–1	1–0
Ipswich Town	2–3	3–1	5–0	1–1	1–2	0–2	1–1	2–4	1–1		1–0	3–0	3–1	3–2	0–2	2–2	2–0	4–2	1–0	4–1	1–5	2–0	0–1	3–0
Leyton Orient	0–1	1–0	2–3	2–0	3–3	7–0	0–4	3–0	1–0	2–0		0–0	1–1	2–1	3–3	1–0	2–0	0–4	4–1	1–4	1–0	0–1	3–0	0–0
Millwall	3–2	3–1	0–3	3–2	1–1	1–1	3–1	4–0	3–1	4–0	2–0		2–0	2–1	2–1	0–2	1–1	3–2	0–0	2–0	0–0	4–1	2–1	1–0
Newport County	4–2	2–0	1–1	1–0	2–2	0–1	1–0	4–0	1–1	2–1	1–0	2–1		2–0	2–2	3–3	1–1	3–1	3–1	3–0	0–0	1–2	4–2	2–5
Northampton Town	6–2	5–3	3–0	1–2	2–0	2–0	5–2	3–1	2–1	1–0	4–0	1–1	5–0		1–2	3–1	3–1	0–3	6–0	4–3	1–0	2–4	4–1	1–4
Norwich City	1–2	2–0	0–1	1–0	1–0	5–2	1–0	1–1	5–0	2–0	1–0	1–0	1–2	2–1		3–0	2–3	2–1	3–1	1–0	2–0	7–0	8–0	3–0
Plymouth Argyle	2–1	4–1	2–2	2–2	1–2	3–1	5–0	2–1	4–2	2–0	3–0	5–0	5–0	2–0	3–1		3–0	3–2	6–1	2–0	3–0	2–2	3–0	3–1
Port Vale	4–1	2–2	1–1	1–0	1–1	1–1	2–0	3–0	1–0	0–0	3–0	2–1	4–2	0–0	0–0	1–0		0–2	1–0	0–0	2–2	2–2	1–0	1–1
Reading	5–1	5–0	1–4	3–0	4–2	4–2	3–1	2–1	2–1	4–0	1–1	2–0	1–2	2–0	1–1	2–0	5–1		6–2	5–2	2–0	6–1	3–0	4–1
Shrewsbury Town	5–1	2–0	1–1	2–0	2–1	1–0	2–1	2–1	2–2	0–2	3–0	0–1	1–4	3–1	0–2	1–3	2–0	2–1		0–1	0–1	1–1	1–2	2–3
Southend	7–1	1–0	2–0	5–1	2–1	3–2	4–0	0–0	3–1	5–0	1–0	0–1	2–1	2–0	2–1	1–1	0–0	2–0	2–2		2–2	2–2	3–0	5–1
Swindon Town	1–1	2–0	0–2	0–0	0–0	2–1	0–2	3–1	2–1	1–2	2–0	2–2	1–1	1–1	1–1	2–2	2–0	2–0	1–2	1–0		2–1	1–1	0–1
Torquay United	6–1	2–2	0–1	1–2	4–2	3–1	1–5	5–1	2–1	2–0	1–1	2–5	1–2	1–2	1–2	3–2	2–3	0–3	3–2	1–3	9–0		1–1	2–0
Walsall	1–0	2–2	1–1	2–0	1–0	1–3	3–0	1–2	1–0	1–3	2–4	1–2	0–1	3–0	4–0	2–5	3–0	2–0	0–4	2–0	0–0	2–3		3–1
Watford	2–2	1–2	3–1	3–1	0–3	0–1	2–0	1–1	2–2	1–1	0–1	1–2	1–1	2–4	1–1	1–3	2–0	3–1	4–1	0–0	1–7	1–2	2–0	

Updated to match(es) played on unknown. Source: Ian Laschke: Rothmans Book of Football League Records 1888–89 to 1978–79. Macdonald and Jane’s, London & Sydney, 1980.
Legend: Blue = home team win; Yellow = draw; Red = away team win.

=== Maps ===
Locations of the Football League Third Division South London teams 1950–1951
Locations of the Football League Third Division South teams 1951–1952

== Attendances ==
=== Division One ===
No.	Club	Average
1	Tottenham Hotspur FC	51,134
2	Arsenal FC	51,030
3	Newcastle United FC	50,476
4	Manchester United	42,916
5	Chelsea FC	39,932
6	Sunderland AFC	39,853
7	Aston Villa FC	38,641
8	Manchester City FC	38,302
9	Liverpool FC	38,019
10	Bolton Wanderers FC	35,832
11	Wolverhampton Wanderers FC	34,437
12	Preston North End FC	32,936
13	Portsmouth FC	32,523
14	Fulham FC	31,645
15	West Bromwich Albion FC	29,580
16	Middlesbrough FC	28,775
17	Charlton Athletic FC	27,609
18	Burnley FC	26,624
19	Blackpool FC	25,854
20	Stoke City FC	25,222
21	Huddersfield Town AFC	24,250
22	Derby County FC	21,949

=== Division Two ===
No.	Club	Average
1	Sheffield Wednesday FC	41,350
2	Everton FC	37,391
3	Sheffield United FC	31,185
4	Hull City AFC	29,210
5	Cardiff City FC	28,945
6	Nottingham Forest FC	28,158
7	Notts County FC	26,525
8	Leicester City FC	26,080
9	Birmingham City FC	24,481
10	Leeds United FC	24,285
11	Blackburn Rovers FC	23,228
12	Brentford FC	23,022
13	Coventry City FC	22,548
14	Doncaster Rovers FC	21,078
15	West Ham United FC	20,264
16	Southampton FC	19,038
17	Rotherham United FC	18,770
18	Swansea City AFC	18,228
19	Queens Park Rangers FC	16,545
20	Luton Town FC	16,284
21	Barnsley FC	15,867
22	Bury FC	14,100

=== Division Three ===
No.	Club	Average
1	Norwich City FC	21,835
2	Millwall FC	19,375
3	Plymouth Argyle FC	19,236
4	Brighton & Hove Albion FC	17,831
5	Bristol City FC	17,780
6	Bristol Rovers FC	17,369
7	Oldham Athletic FC	16,153
8	Reading FC	15,455
9	Grimsby Town FC	14,909
10	Crystal Palace FC	14,873
11	Lincoln City FC	13,811
12	Gillingham FC	12,576
13	Bradford Park Avenue AFC	12,101
14	Stockport County FC	12,030
15	Northampton Town FC	11,767
16	Bradford City AFC	11,558
17	Leyton Orient FC	11,487
18	Ipswich Town FC	11,377
19	Port Vale FC	11,272
20	AFC Bournemouth	10,872
21	Swindon Town FC	10,564
22	Carlisle United FC	10,100
23	Newport County AFC	9,912
24	Shrewsbury Town FC	9,799
25	Chesterfield FC	9,730
26	Watford FC	9,609
27	Mansfield Town FC	9,569
28	Colchester United FC	9,414
29	Hartlepool United FC	9,248
30	Southend United FC	8,963
31	Exeter City FC	8,321
32	Scunthorpe United FC	8,303
33	Wrexham AFC	8,161
34	York City FC	7,968
35	Tranmere Rovers	7,567
36	Torquay United FC	7,565
37	Aldershot Town FC	7,493
38	Walsall FC	7,084
39	Barrow AFC	6,939
40	Halifax Town AFC	6,745
41	Workington AFC	6,679
42	Accrington Stanley FC	6,378
43	Chester City FC	6,146
44	Gateshead AFC	6,114
45	Crewe Alexandra FC	6,061
46	Southport FC	5,452
47	Darlington FC	5,044
48	Rochdale AFC	4,992

== See also ==
- 1951-52 in English football
