= 1950–51 Manchester United F.C. season =

English football club season

Manchester United
1950–51 season
- Chairman: James W. Gibson
- Manager: Matt Busby
- First Division: 2nd
- FA Cup: Sixth Round
- Top goalscorer: League: Stan Pearson (18); All: Stan Pearson (23)
- Highest home attendance: 55,434 vs Leeds United (27 January 1951)
- Lowest home attendance: 24,764 vs West Bromwich Albion (14 April 1951)
- Average home league attendance: 38,752
Home colours	Away colours

The 1950–51 season was Manchester United's 49th season in the Football League. The club finished runners-up to champions Tottenham Hotspur in the league and were also quarter-finalists in the FA Cup.

A notable debutant for the club this season was 17-year-old Barnsley born centre-half Mark Jones.

== First Division ==
Date	Opponents	H / A	Result F–A	Scorers	Attendance
19 August 1950	Fulham	H	1–0	Pearson	44,042
23 August 1950	Liverpool	A	1–2	Rowley	30,211
26 August 1950	Bolton Wanderers	A	0–1		40,431
30 August 1950	Liverpool	H	1–0	Downie	34,835
2 September 1950	Blackpool	H	1–0	Bogan	53,260
4 September 1950	Aston Villa	A	3–1	Rowley (2), Pearson	42,724
9 September 1950	Tottenham Hotspur	A	0–1		60,621
13 September 1950	Aston Villa	H	0–0		33,021
16 September 1950	Charlton Athletic	H	3–0	Delaney, Pearson, Rowley	36,619
23 September 1950	Middlesbrough	A	2–1	Pearson (2)	48,051
30 September 1950	Wolverhampton Wanderers	A	0–0		45,898
7 October 1950	Sheffield Wednesday	H	3–1	Downie, McShane, Rowley	40,651
14 October 1950	Arsenal	A	0–3		66,150
21 October 1950	Portsmouth	H	0–0		41,842
28 October 1950	Everton	A	4–1	Rowley (2), Aston, Pearson	51,142
4 November 1950	Burnley	H	1–1	McShane	39,454
11 November 1950	Chelsea	A	0–1		51,882
18 November 1950	Stoke City	H	0–0		30,031
25 November 1950	West Bromwich Albion	A	1–0	Birch	28,146
2 December 1950	Newcastle United	H	1–2	Birch	34,502
9 December 1950	Huddersfield Town	A	3–2	Aston (2), Birkett	26,713
16 December 1950	Fulham	A	2–2	Pearson (2)	19,649
23 December 1950	Bolton Wanderers	H	2–3	Aston, Pearson	35,382
25 December 1950	Sunderland	A	1–2	Aston	41,215
26 December 1950	Sunderland	H	3–5	Bogan (2), Aston	35,176
13 January 1951	Tottenham Hotspur	H	2–1	Birch, Rowley	43,283
20 January 1951	Charlton Athletic	A	2–1	Aston, Birkett	31,978
3 February 1951	Middlesbrough	H	1–0	Pearson	44,633
17 February 1951	Wolverhampton Wanderers	H	2–1	Birch, Rowley	42,022
26 February 1951	Sheffield Wednesday	A	4–0	McShane, Downie, Pearson, Rowley	25,693
3 March 1951	Arsenal	H	3–1	Aston (2), Downie	46,202
10 March 1951	Portsmouth	A	0–0		33,148
17 March 1951	Everton	H	3–0	Aston, Downie, Pearson	29,317
23 March 1951	Derby County	H	2–0	Aston, Downie	42,009
24 March 1951	Burnley	A	2–1	Aston, McShane	36,656
26 March 1951	Derby County	A	4–2	Aston, Downie, Pearson, Rowley	25,860
31 March 1951	Chelsea	H	4–1	Pearson (3), McShane	25,779
7 April 1951	Stoke City	A	0–2		25,690
14 April 1951	West Bromwich Albion	H	3–0	Downie, Pearson, Rowley	24,764
21 April 1951	Newcastle United	A	2–0	Rowley, Pearson	45,209
28 April 1951	Huddersfield Town	H	6–0	Aston (2), McShane (2), Downie, Rowley	25,560
5 May 1951	Blackpool	A	1–1	Downie	22,864

Pos	Team	Pld	W	D	L	GF	GA	GAv	Pts
1	Tottenham Hotspur (C)	42	25	10	7	82	44	1.864	60
2	Manchester United	42	24	8	10	74	40	1.850	56
3	Blackpool	42	20	10	12	79	53	1.491	50
4	Newcastle United	42	18	13	11	62	53	1.170	49
5	Arsenal	42	19	9	14	73	56	1.304	47

Source: World Football
Rules for classification: 1) Points; 2) Goal average; 3) Goals scored
(C) Champions

== FA Cup ==
Date	Round	Opponents	H / A	Result F–A	Scorers	Attendance
6 January 1951	Round 3	Oldham Athletic	H	4–1	Pearson, Aston, Birch, own goal	37,161
27 January 1951	Round 4	Leeds United	H	4–0	Pearson (3), Rowley	55,434
10 February 1951	Round 5	Arsenal	H	1–0	Pearson	55,058
24 February 1951	Round 6	Birmingham City	A	0–1		50,000

== Squad statistics ==
Pos.	Name	League		FA Cup		Total	
Pos.	Name	Apps	Goals	Apps	Goals	Apps	Goals
GK	(England) Reg Allen	40	0	4	0	44	0
GK	(England) Jack Crompton	2	0	0	0	2	0
FB	(Republic of Ireland) Johnny Carey	39	0	4	0	43	0
FB	(Scotland) Tommy Lowrie	0	0	1	0	1	0
FB	(England) Thomas McNulty	4	0	1	0	5	0
FB	(England) Billy Redman	16	0	2	0	18	0
HB	(England) Allenby Chilton	38	0	4	0	42	0
HB	(England) Henry Cockburn	35	0	4	0	39	0
HB	(England) Don Gibson	32	0	3	0	35	0
HB	(England) Mark Jones	4	0	0	0	4	0
HB	(England) Billy McGlen	26	0	1	0	27	0
HB	(Scotland) Ed McIlvenny	2	0	0	0	2	0
HB	(England) Jeff Whitefoot	2	0	0	0	2	0
FW	(England) John Aston, Sr.	41	15	4	1	45	16
FW	(England) Brian Birch	8	4	4	1	12	5
FW	(England) Cliff Birkett	9	2	4	0	13	2
FW	(Scotland) Tommy Bogan	11	3	0	0	11	3
FW	(England) Laurie Cassidy	1	0	0	0	1	0
FW	(England) Frank Clempson	2	0	0	0	2	0
FW	(Scotland) Jimmy Delaney	13	1	0	0	13	1
FW	(Scotland) John Downie	29	10	0	0	29	10
FW	(Scotland) Harry McShane	30	7	1	0	31	7
FW	(England) Stan Pearson	39	18	4	5	43	23
FW	(England) Jack Rowley	39	14	3	1	42	15
–	Own goals	–	0	–	1	–	1
