= 1955–56 Manchester United F.C. season =

74th season in existence of Manchester United

Manchester United
1955–56 season
- Chairman: Harold Hardman
- Manager: Matt Busby
- First Division: 1st
- FA Cup: Third Round
- Top goalscorer: League: Tommy Taylor (25); All: Tommy Taylor (25)
- Highest home attendance: 62,277 vs Blackpool (7 April 1956)
- Lowest home attendance: 22,192 vs Chelsea (19 November 1955)
- Average home league attendance: 38,893
Home colours	Away colours

The 1955–56 season was Manchester United's 54th season in the Football League, and their 11th consecutive season in the top division of English football.

A United side consisted mostly of players in their late teens and early twenties finished the season as league champions 11 points ahead of their nearest rivals Blackpool and Wolves.

Right-half Eddie Colman made his debut for United this season, first featuring in the league match against Bolton Wanderers at Burnden Park on 12 November 1955 and was soon a regular partner to Duncan Edwards in the United half-back positions. Colman's breakthrough forced Jeff Whitefoot out of the team and contributed to his transfer to Grimsby Town in the summer of 1956, while long-serving goalkeeper Jack Crompton played his final game for United this season.

== First Division ==
Date	Opponents	H / A	Result F–A	Scorers	Attendance
20 August 1955	Birmingham City	A	2–2	Viollet (2)	37,994
24 August 1955	Tottenham Hotspur	H	2–2	Berry, Webster	25,406
27 August 1955	West Bromwich Albion	H	3–1	Lewis, Scanlon, Viollet	31,996
31 August 1955	Tottenham Hotspur	A	2–1	Edwards (2)	27,453
3 September 1955	Manchester City	A	0–1		59,162
7 September 1955	Everton	H	2–1	Blanchflower, Edwards	27,843
10 September 1955	Sheffield United	A	0–1		28,241
14 September 1955	Everton	A	2–4	Blanchflower, Webster	34,897
17 September 1955	Preston North End	H	3–2	Pegg, Taylor, Viollet	33,078
24 September 1955	Burnley	A	0–0		26,873
1 October 1955	Luton Town	H	3–1	Taylor (2), Colin Webster	34,409
8 October 1955	Wolverhampton Wanderers	H	4–3	Taylor (2), Doherty, Pegg	48,638
15 October 1955	Aston Villa	A	4–4	Pegg (2), Blanchflower, Webster	29,478
22 October 1955	Huddersfield Town	H	3–0	Berry, Pegg, Taylor	34,150
29 October 1955	Cardiff City	A	1–0	Taylor	27,795
5 November 1955	Arsenal	H	1–1	Taylor	41,586
12 November 1955	Bolton Wanderers	A	1–3	Taylor	38,109
19 November 1955	Chelsea	H	3–0	Taylor (2), Byrne	22,192
26 November 1955	Blackpool	A	0–0		26,240
3 December 1955	Sunderland	H	2–1	Doherty, Viollet	39,901
10 December 1955	Portsmouth	A	2–3	Pegg, Taylor	24,594
17 December 1955	Birmingham City	H	2–1	Jones, Viollet	27,704
24 December 1955	West Bromwich Albion	A	4–1	Viollet (3), Taylor	25,168
26 December 1955	Charlton Athletic	H	5–1	Viollet (2), Byrne, Doherty, Taylor	44,611
27 December 1955	Charlton Athletic	A	0–3		42,040
31 December 1955	Manchester City	H	2–1	Taylor, Viollet	60,956
14 January 1956	Sheffield United	H	3–1	Berry, Pegg, Taylor	30,162
21 January 1956	Preston North End	A	1–3	Whelan	28,047
4 February 1956	Burnley	H	2–0	Taylor, Viollet	27,342
11 February 1956	Luton Town	A	2–0	Viollet, Whelan	16,354
18 February 1956	Wolverhampton Wanderers	A	2–0	Taylor (2)	40,014
25 February 1956	Aston Villa	H	1–0	Whelan	36,277
3 March 1956	Chelsea	A	4–2	Viollet (2), Pegg, Taylor	32,050
10 March 1956	Cardiff City	H	1–1	Byrne	44,693
17 March 1956	Arsenal	A	1–1	Viollet	50,758
24 March 1956	Bolton Wanderers	H	1–0	Taylor	46,114
30 March 1956	Newcastle United	H	5–2	Viollet (2), Doherty, Pegg, Taylor	58,994
31 March 1956	Huddersfield Town	A	2–0	Taylor (2)	37,780
2 April 1956	Newcastle United	A	0–0		37,395
7 April 1956	Blackpool	H	2–1	Berry, Taylor	62,277
14 April 1956	Sunderland	A	2–2	McGuinness, Whelan	19,865
21 April 1956	Portsmouth	H	1–0	Viollet	38,417

Pos	Team	Pld	W	D	L	GF	GA	GAv	Pts	Qualification or relegation
1	Manchester United (C)	42	25	10	7	83	51	1.627	60	Qualification for the European Cup preliminary round
2	Blackpool	42	20	9	13	86	62	1.387	49	
3	Wolverhampton Wanderers	42	20	9	13	89	65	1.369	49	
4	Manchester City	42	18	10	14	82	69	1.188	46	
5	Arsenal	42	18	10	14	60	61	0.984	46	

Source: World Football
Rules for classification: 1) Points; 2) Goal average; 3) Goals scored
(C) Champions

== FA Cup ==
Date	Round	Opponents	H / A	Result F – A	Scorers	Attendance
7 January 1956	Round 3	Bristol Rovers	A	0–4		35,872

== Squad statistics ==
Pos.	Name	League		FA Cup		Total	
Pos.	Name	Apps	Goals	Apps	Goals	Apps	Goals
GK	(England) Jack Crompton	1	0	0	0	1	0
GK	(England) Ray Wood	41	0	1	0	42	0
FB	(England) Geoff Bent	4	0	0	0	4	0
FB	(England) Roger Byrne	39	3	1	0	40	3
FB	(England) Bill Foulkes	26	0	1	0	27	0
FB	(England) Ian Greaves	15	0	0	0	15	0
HB	(Northern Ireland) Jackie Blanchflower	18	3	0	0	18	3
HB	(England) Eddie Colman	25	0	1	0	26	0
HB	(England) Duncan Edwards	33	3	0	0	33	3
HB	(England) Freddie Goodwin	8	0	0	0	8	0
HB	(England) Mark Jones	42	1	1	0	43	1
HB	(England) Wilf McGuinness	3	1	0	0	3	1
HB	(England) Jeff Whitefoot	15	0	1	0	16	0
HB	(England) Walter Whitehurst	1	0	0	0	1	0
FW	(England) Johnny Berry	34	4	1	0	35	4
FW	(England) John Doherty	16	4	1	0	17	4
FW	(England) Eddie Lewis	4	1	0	0	4	1
FW	(England) David Pegg	35	9	1	0	36	9
FW	(England) Albert Scanlon	6	1	0	0	6	1
FW	(Northern Ireland) Jackie Scott	1	0	0	0	1	0
FW	(England) Tommy Taylor	33	25	1	0	34	25
FW	(England) Dennis Viollet	34	20	1	0	35	20
FW	(Wales) Colin Webster	15	4	0	0	15	4
FW	(Republic of Ireland) Billy Whelan	13	4	0	0	13	4
