= Outwood Academy Danum =

Location
- Armthorpe Road; Doncaster, South Yorkshire, DN2 5QD; England
- 53.534023°N 1.083193°W

Information
- Type: Academy
- Motto: Students First
- Established: 1931
- Local authority: Doncaster
- Department for Education URN: 143938 Tables
- Ofsted: Reports
- Chair of Governors: Judy Parker
- Principal: Amanda Crane
- Staff: 270
- Gender: Mixed
- Age: 11 to 18
- Enrolment: 1224 as of May 2024
- Capacity: 1926
- Houses: Africa, Asia, Americas, and Europe
- Colours: Purple and gold
- Former names: Danum Grammar School; Danum School; Danum School Technology College; Danum Academy, Intake High School
- Website: danum.outwood.com

Outwood Academy Danum (formerly Danum School Technology College, Danum Academy and Intake Secondary Modern) is an academy school serving the east of Doncaster, South Yorkshire, England. Students primarily come from the Intake, Wheatley and Wheatley Hills estates, with some coming from nearby Armthorpe. The academy's name is based on that of former schools and is a nod to the Roman history of the town as Danum is the Roman name for Doncaster.

== Admissions ==
It is for ages 11–18. The academy is split into two sites; the Main School which caters for the students in Years 7, 8, 9, 10 and 11 on Armthorpe Road and the Sixth Form Centre which educates Years 12 and 13 on Leger Way. The main school site is next to the A18.

== History ==
The history of Outwood Academy Danum starts in 1931 with the original Central Schools. This led over time to the creation of three separate institutions which over the course of their history merged and replaced each other.

The school was originally the Central Schools, located on Danum Road and opened in 1931 with the boys and girls separated. After the Second World War, the girls department was renamed the Technical High School for Girls and the boys department changed its name to the Central Boys Secondary Modern School. The Central Boys Secondary Modern Schools was replaced by Intake High School which opened in 1957 on Leger Way.

=== Grammar schools ===
Doncaster Technical High School for Girls became Doncaster Technical Grammar School for Girls in the early 1960s, later becoming Danum Grammar School for Girls on Danum Road. Doncaster Technical High School for Boys on Greyfriars Road moved to Armthorpe Road in the 1950s, following the construction and opening of a new site, and had a similar name change to the girls' school. Edward Semper, the headmaster of the boys' schools, was one of the UK's leading proponents of specialist technical schools.

The Danum Grammar School for Boys (c. 500 boys) and Danum Grammar School for Girls merged in 1970 to form the co-educational selective Danum Grammar School. The school was administered by the County Borough of Doncaster Education Committee and had around 800 boys and girls. The Danum Grammar School operated from three sites across the town: at Danum Road, Leger Way and Armthorpe Road. The Danum Road site was closed in the 1980s and was run by the local council as a music centre.

=== Comprehensive ===
In 1978 Danum Grammar School became the comprehensive Danum School, merging with Intake High School, located on Leger Way.

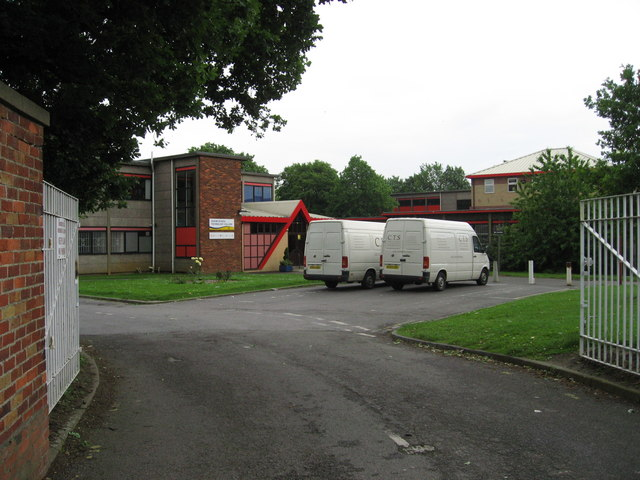
Technical College Campus (2007)

Danum School gained Technology College status in 2002, and changed its name to reflect its new specialism.

In 2006, students were asked to suggest names for the school houses. These were eventually decided as

- Belle Vue, (House colour Red) – named after the former home of Doncaster Rovers.
- St George, (House colour Yellow) – named after the minster and iconic building of Doncaster.
- St Leger, (House colour Green). – named after the famous classic horse race.
- Mallard, (House colour Blue) – named after the steam train that was built in Doncaster.

=== Danum Academy ===
On 1 September 2011 Danum School Technology College formally gained academy status, and changed its name to Danum Academy.

School Logo used from 2014 to 2016.

The school joined the CfBT Schools Trust in October 2011 and remained the sponsor of the school until 2016. In the Ofsted inspection of October 2011, the school was found to be Good by Ofsted. However, this judgement was not retained at the 2013 inspection where inspectors found the academy was 'Inadequate'. The report commented that the school required special measures as achievement was inadequate, progress was too slow, attendance being poor and not improving listed among other reasons for the judgement.

=== Outwood Academy Danum ===
In 2016, Danum Academy was taken over by Outwood Grange Academies Trust after the CfBT declared that it 'could not make rapid enough improvement' to the school. Upon joining the Outwood family of schools the name was changed to Outwood Academy Danum. Shortly after this the site at Leger Way was closed and all teaching moved to the Armthorpe Road site. In 2022, a new sports and mathematics block opened adjacent to Armthorpe Road. This houses 11 new classrooms, and a sports hall with changing facilities. A new car park was developed complete with electric car chargers.

=== Headteachers ===
2000: Mr. M. J. Vickers
2006: Dr K. Simmonds
2013 – 2016: Rebecca Staples
2016 – 2022: Jayne Gaunt
2022 – Present: Amanda Crane

=== Former teachers ===
- Peter Davies (politician)

== Sixth form ==
=== Historic Performance ===
Danum Sixth Form is located on Armthorpe Road and has approximately 450 students. The sixth form only accepts students with certain academic requirements; these are 6 GCSEs at grade C or above, including Maths and English.

In 2005, Danum Sixth Form achieved the highest point score per A Level than any other sixth form in Doncaster. Also, over 80% of leavers in 2005 continued their studies to pursue degree courses; these included Oxford and Cambridge.

In 2016, the sixth form's A Level results remained above the Doncaster average, with a progress score of +0.18 and an average grade of C.

=== Present Day ===
The sixth form provision at the school is shared with Outwood Academy Adwick to provide a larger number of courses for students. The provision as of May 2024 has 126 students.

== Sport ==
The school won the English School's basketball championship in 2006, beating Shenfield School 76–65 in the National Final, which was played in the Hemel Hempstead sports centre.

== Present day ==
As of January 2022, Amanda Crane has taken over the role principal of Outwood Academy Danum replacing the former Principal Jayne Gaunt. Amanda Crane came from a previous post at Wickersley School and Sports College in Rotherham. In the same year, it was announced that the school were trying to sell the 'Technical College Campus' (off Leger Way), both building and grounds, which had not been used for more than five years. The site is physically detached from the rest of the school.

In March 2023, a number of pupils protested against a school policy which left toilet facilities locked behind a shutter during lesson time. The shutters were also received with heavy criticism from parents and the general public and has appeared in local news.

The academy was inspected by Ofsted in 2024 and the overall effectiveness of the academy was found to be Good.

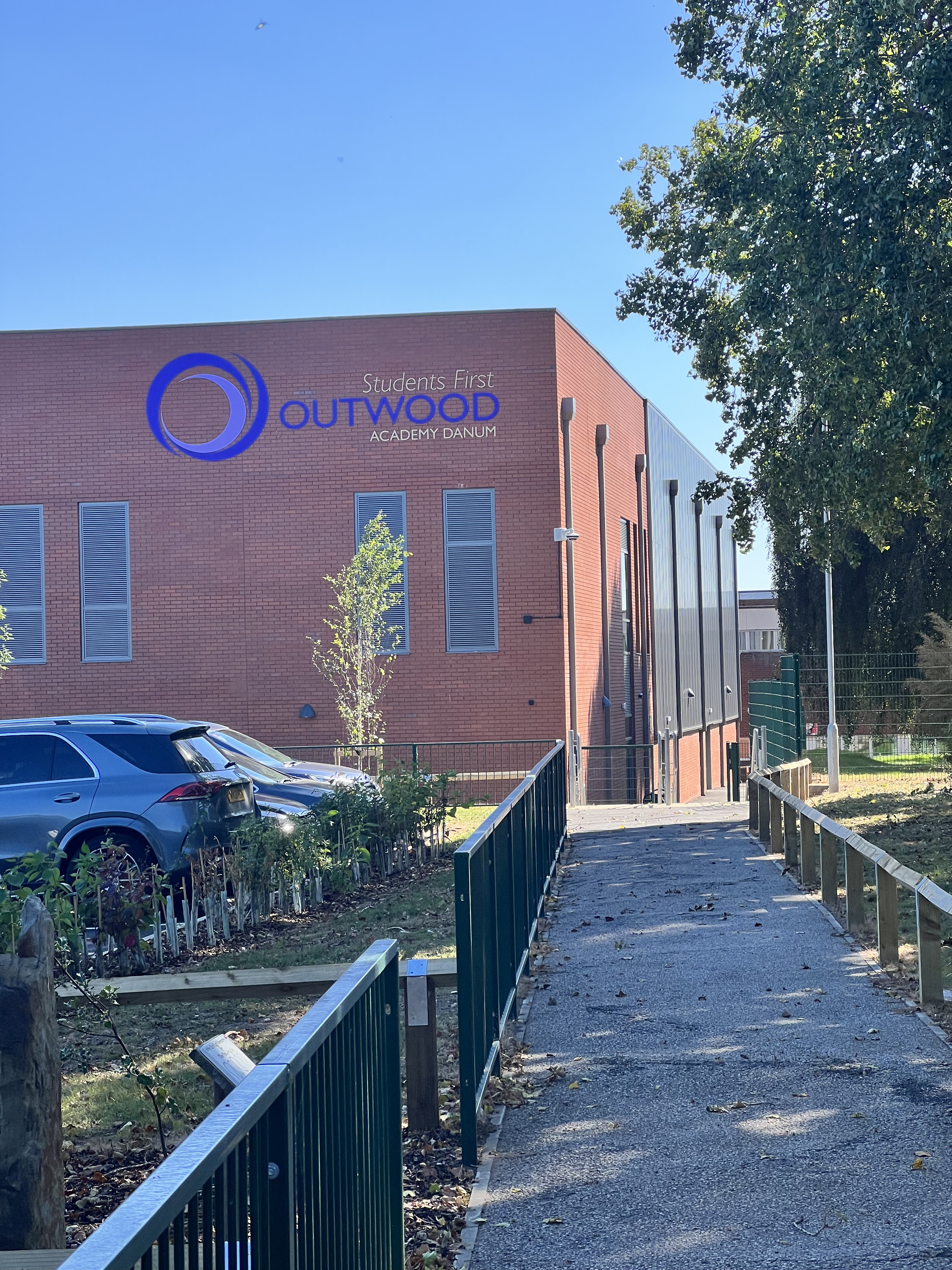
Showing the western elevation of the sports hall at Outwood Academy, viewed looking south.

== Notable alumni ==
- Jonti Picking – internet Flash animator, best known for the meme Badgers.
- Julia Mallam – actress, best known for being on Emmerdale
- Danny Rose – footballer, currently playing for Tottenham Hotspur and England
- Thomas Howes (actor) – best known for being on Downton Abbey

=== Danum Grammar School ===
- Neil Dudgeon – actor was known for his part in Midsomer Murders as John Barnaby
- Steve Hogarth – Musician and vocalist since 1989 with Marillion, previously with The Europeans and How We Live

=== Doncaster Technical High School for Boys ===
- David Pegg, Manchester United footballer who died in the Munich air disaster in February 1958
