= United (2011 film) =

- Title screen, featuring the Manchester United home changing rooms.
- Genre: Drama
- Written by: Chris Chibnall
- Directed by: James Strong
- Starring: David Tennant; Jack O'Connell; Sam Claflin; Dougray Scott
- Theme music composer: Clint Mansell
- Country of origin: United Kingdom
- Original language: English

Production
- Producer: Julia Stannard
- Running time: 91 minutes
- Budget: £2 million

Original release
- Network: BBC Two; BBC HD
- Release: 24 April 2011

United is a British television film directed by James Strong and written by Chris Chibnall. It is based on the true story of Manchester United's "Busby Babes" and the aftermath of the 1958 Munich air disaster, with the film's events taking place between August 1956 and May 1958. In particular, the film focuses on the experiences of and relationship between assistant manager Jimmy Murphy, played by David Tennant, and a young striker, Bobby Charlton, played by Jack O'Connell.

Largely filmed around the North East of England, the film was first broadcast on 24 April 2011 on BBC Two and BBC HD, and sold internationally as a theatrical picture by Content Media Corp. The series gained a 14.3% rating in its time slot and was generally well received by television critics.

== Plot ==
In the autumn of 1956, manager Matt Busby gives Bobby Charlton his debut with Manchester United's first team, nicknamed the ‘Busby Babes’, under the guidance of Busby and assistant manager Jimmy Murphy.

These younger players include centre-half Mark Jones, left-half Duncan Edwards, right-half Eddie Colman and outside left David Pegg. A rare signing is then made when Busby signs Northern Irish goalkeeper Harry Gregg in late 1957.

Meanwhile, Busby has persuaded Football League administrator Alan Hardaker to allow his team to play in the European Cup with the proviso that they are back in time for each scheduled fixture. They first compete for this title in the 1956–57 campaign after winning the league title and are able to compete in the cup again the following season after retaining their domestic crown.

The team succeeds both at home and abroad. However, on the return flight from a European Cup match in Belgrade, their aeroplane crashes while attempting to take off after refuelling in Munich and seven of the club's players (including Jones, Colman and Pegg) are killed. Gregg is instrumental in saving survivors from the wreckage of the plane, while Charlton suffers minor injuries. Edwards and Busby are seriously injured.

Within a week, Charlton is allowed to leave the hospital and return to England but Edwards and Busby remain in a critical condition. Murphy was not on the plane when it crashed due to his duties managing the Welsh national side, but flies out as soon as he can in order to visit his injured colleagues in hospital and travel home with Charlton.

Two weeks after the crash, Edwards dies in hospital, heaping fresh devastation on Charlton, who is ready to give up football until he has a visit from Murphy and is soon playing for United again.

Against the odds, Murphy vows to present a team to play their next home game and, ultimately, the 1958 FA Cup Final, taking charge of the first team until the following season as Busby recovers from his injuries.

== Cast ==
- David Tennant as Jimmy Murphy
- Jack O'Connell as Bobby Charlton
- Sam Claflin as Duncan Edwards
- Dougray Scott as Matt Busby
- Dean Andrews as Bert Whalley
- Kate Ashfield as Alma George
- David Calder as Harold Hardman
- Neil Dudgeon as Alan Hardaker
- Tim Healy as Tommy Skinner
- Melanie Hill as Cissie Charlton
- Bill Fellows as Robert Charlton
- Philip Hill-Pearson as Eddie Colman
- Thomas Howes as Mark Jones
- Ben Peel as Harry Gregg
- Brogan West as David Pegg

== Production ==
Bobby Charlton, still in shock, walks back towards the stricken airframe. The production included a full recreation of the disaster. The film was shot in a 2.35:1 aspect ratio.

The film was produced by World Productions with a budget of £2 million. In writing his script, Chris Chibnall drew on first-hand interviews with the survivors and their families. It was shot in November and December 2010 in the north of England including the Tyneside Cinema, Tynemouth Metro Station, Newcastle Civic Centre and the Assembly Rooms. Brunton Park in Carlisle doubled for the inside of Old Trafford and Žalgiris Stadium in Vilnius, Lithuania as the Stadium JNA in the 1950s. The shoot took four six-day weeks of filming and was hindered by heavy snowfall in December; one extra day cost the production £30,000 because the project was not insured against inclement weather conditions.

In recreating the crash, it was felt it would be appropriate to see events unfold through Charlton's eyes. O'Connell stated that it had a dream-like quality. "It has a lethargic feel. So it doesn't necessarily seem like reality. There's a hazy sense about it." Dougray Scott stated "We filmed the scene [of the crash] on a military base up in Newcastle. There were some people sitting in seats without a scratch on them, dead, others without a scratch on them alive, some with terrible injuries and dead. It was an emotional part of the shoot."

The score, composed by Clint Mansell, was released on iTunes in April 2011. It is Mansell's first TV film credit. The ending credit sequence features the song "Devotion" by Paul Weller.

== Ratings and critical reception ==
The film gained a 2.89 million (12.8%) audience share for BBC Two at 9pm, with a further 346,000 (1.5%) viewers watching on BBC HD.

Sandy Busby, the son of Matt Busby, said he thought the film was "very poorly done" stating that he was disappointed that the Busby family had not been contacted about the film, pointing out the drama is about the "Busby Babes". He went on to state he was "disgusted" with the portrayal of his father and critical about the omission of some players from the film; "Why didn't they include other players that died and were injured in the crash? If I was one of their family I would be very upset." In particular, he criticised film's portrayal of his father, which he thought made him look like a gangster; "I was disgusted with the portrayal of my father. He had this camel coat on, and a fedora, and all through the film he was never seen in a tracksuit. He was known as probably the first tracksuit manager at that time. I was disgusted."

Television reviews such as Gerard Gilbert in The Independent also noted a gangster-like appearance in Busby's costume, and suggested that painting Alan Hardaker as the villain seemed tame; "compared to Jimmy McGovern's Hillsborough, with its burning righteous anger aimed at the police and The Sun, Hardaker seemed like a flimsy scapegoat for what, au fond, was an appalling accident."

Jim White, writing for The Telegraph was more positive stating "United...is brilliant in its evocation of the pipe-puffing Fifties football orbit...the CGI evocation of immediate post-war Old Trafford, with the smokestacks brooding above the open terraces, looks more authentic than the real thing...David Tennant's performance as the central character should alert every award-giving body."

Centre-half Mark Jones was portrayed as United's captain in the film, when in real life the captain of the team was Roger Byrne, who also died in the disaster and was not credited in the film. Indeed, just six of the seventeen players involved in the crash were credited in the film.

Sam Wollaston in The Guardian commended the smaller period details, stating "There are lots of nice little differences between football then and football now. Can you imagine any of today's lot feeling that kind of connection not just with the club but with the whole area? Or living with a landlady? Or telling a girl they were a plumber because plumbers had better prospects than footballers? Or smoking a pipe on the way out of the tunnel, as team captain Mark Jones did? Lovely. But, of course, at the heart of Chris Chibnall's poignant drama is the tragedy that claimed eight of the Busby Babes. It's beautifully done – powerful, haunting and very human. And if you didn't shed a tear, then you're harder than I am."

The drama was nominated at the 2011 Prix Europa Awards as "Best European TV Production".

== See also ==
- List of association football films
