= Banzai (TV series) =

British comedy gambling game show

- Genre: Comedy; Game show
- Created by: Gary Monaghan
- Starring: Masashi Fujimoto (Mr Banzai); Jit Loi Chong (Mr Cheeky Chappy); Shizuka Hata (Lady One Question); Ryozo Kohira (Mr Shake Hands Man: Series 1); Tadao Tomomatsu (Mr Shake Hands Man Two: Series 2–3)
- Voices of: Burt Kwouk; Eiji Kusuhara
- Country of origin: United Kingdom
- Original language: English
- No. of series: 3
- No. of episodes: 25 (list of episodes)

Production
- Running time: 24 minutes
- Production company: Radar

Original release
- Network: E4
- Release: 18 January 2001 – 15 May 2003

Banzai is a British comedy gambling game show which spoofs Japanese game shows. It was produced by Radar, part of RDF Media. Each segment of the show is a silly or bizarre contest. Members of the viewing audience were encouraged to bet with each other on the outcome of each segment.

== Format ==
The show plays off like a betting show. In each segment, a bizarre challenge is presented with a choice of outcomes. Viewers are given a short amount of time to 'place their bets' before the challenge starts.

Betting contests on the show included grannies playing chicken with motorised wheelchairs, amputee football, egg eating, blindfolded petrol pumping, and the length of time it would take an object to hit the ground after being dropped from a roof. The show regularly skirted the bounds of what some would consider politically incorrect television content including nudity, sexuality, violence, swearing, racism, and sexism. Examples of the controversial contests would be to guess which man in a line-up has the longest penis, spying on lady nurses getting undressed, or who will first put their foot into a shoe filled with dog poo.

Many minor, and occasionally major, celebrities took part in the stunts. Usually the celebrity would be ridiculed in the segment while they stay composed, straight-faced, and serious. In one, actor Peter Davison, was asked which of three other Doctor Who lead actors he would most like to have sex with. Celebrities appearing with Mr Shake Hands Man or Lady One Question would be caught unaware in public setting.

Virtually every segment features background music, taken from the 1970s or 80s United Kingdom charts. Voiceovers (Eiji Kusuhara, and especially those by Burt Kwouk) are Engrish spoken with a heavily exaggerated Asian accent ("prace your bets – no bet, no get!"). At the end of each episode are the outtakes, often with the featured celebrities breaking their serious composure, and upcoming gambling contests that would never be shown.

== Characters ==
- Mr Banzai (Masashi Fujimoto)
  He does not speak except for saying and singing the word "Banzai" in different ways. Mr Banzai acts as referee for many of the contests, directing participants to begin by solemnly clapping his hands and emitting a kiai.
- Mr Cheeky Chappy (Jit Loi Chong)
  He wiggles his spectacles, grins, and laughs to camera. Occasionally he facilitates some of the contests.
- Mr Shake Hands Man (Ryozo Kohira)
  He tries to maintain a handshake with unaware celebrities for as long as possible. He was later replaced when he became too well known with Mr Shake Hands Man Two.
- Mr Shake Hands Man Two (Tadao Tomomatsu)
  He has a slightly different tactic to the original Mr Shake Hands Man. He poses as a Japanese reporter and often translates dialogue into Japanese to make conversations, and handshakes, last a little longer.
- Lady One Question (Shizuka Hata)
  She poses as a celebrity reporter, asks a single interview question and then stares silently at the celebrity interviewee. Bets are on how long it takes the celebrity to put a stop to the ruse.

== Broadcast history ==
Banzai first aired in the United Kingdom on the digital channel E4. It was repeated a few months later on E4's parent channel, Channel 4. It has been repeated on three other channels in the United Kingdom: Challenge, Dave and 4Music. It was later picked up for broadcast in Canada by Citytv, which broadcast the original, uncut, unedited episodes.

It was broadcast in the United States on USA Network for a short time only, and in a different format where the segments were cut up and interspersed with a movie. In 2003, Fox picked up the series in the United States (and Americanized it by editing content and saying that some of the people were from the United States instead of parts of the United Kingdom), airing its first episode on 13 July.

It also aired in Brazil in 2005 on the cable channel Multishow. It was broadcast with subtitles with no editing whatsoever.

After six episodes, however, pressure from Asian American groups led Fox to drop the show. In early 2004, the show found a new home on Comedy Central. Repeats moved once again on March 6 2006, to G4 as part of its late-night prime programming block Midnight Spank (formerly known as G4 Late Nights and Barbed Wire Biscuit). The recently-opened Philippine cable channel Jack TV also runs Banzai in a primetime weekend slot. RPN also runs the series in the Philippines every Thursday night at 7:30pm. It also airs in Australia on Fox8 and Channel V.

The series was broadcast in Italy on MTV Italy on Friday nights with Italian dubbing in early 2002. It was also broadcast in the United States on Fox 5 and Fox 5 HD on Wednesday nights. Banzai is sometimes mistaken for a Japanese-produced show, such as on Comcast's interactive guide.

== Controversy ==
In August 2001, two years before Fox aired its first episode of Banzai, USA Network aired clips of the Channel 4 edition of the show as part of their Banzai Movie Friday. Some Asian American groups objected to the clips.

When Fox picked up the show, the Media Action Network for Asian-Americans protested outside a presentation of the show in Hollywood. Group co-founder Guy Aoki told BBC News, "It's just all the backward images of Asian American people. This is like an Asian minstrel show. Can you imagine the black version of Banzai?".

In April 2002, the show caused further controversy when they attempted to record a sketch during the funeral of Queen Elizabeth the Queen Mother. The film crew were reportedly trying to measure the speed of the funeral procession, with a speed gun to allow viewers to bet on the speed. The police however stopped this, before the procession could pass.

== Series overview ==
Series overview
Series	Episodes	Originally released	
Series	Episodes	First released	Last released
1	8	18 January 2001	8 March 2001
2	9	13 November 2001	2 January 2002
3	8	27 March 2003	15 May 2003

== Episode list ==
Episodes are listed in the series order on the Channel 4 on-demand service, which vary from the original broadcast order, and include the Christmas special into Series 2. The betting opportunities and celebrity appearances are listed for each episode.

=== Series 1 (2001) ===
No. overall	No. in series	Original release date
1	1	18 January 2001
Old Lady Wheelchair Chicken Challenge, The Small Animal Balloon Lift Gamble, The Generous Portioned Gentleman Gamble, The Wheel Of Misfortune, Mr Shake Hands Man (Anna Nolan), The Naughty Lady Chatline Challenge, The Dishonourable Door Deception (Ian Smith), The Breast Weight Gamble (Nancy Lam), The Banzai Polling Booth Big Bet (Peter Davison), The Great Supermarket Trolley Cake Jump
2	2	23 January 2001
Men of Fire - War of Water, The Trouserless Cricket Man Conundrum (Phil Tufnell), Mr Shake Hands Man (Chris Tarrant), The Old Lady Fish Man Challenge (Fish), The Metally Mouthed Lady Puzzle, The Old Lady Tower Torment, Squirrel Fishing, Tramp Beer Temptation, Ye Olde Supermarket Trolley Jousting Tournament
3	3	25 January 2001
The Lying Lady Puzzle, The Pat Sharp Water Challenge, The Genital Wedge Gamble (Peter Dean), Posh Lady Dirty Mouth, The Lying Breakdance Man Puzzle, The Lying Breast Puzzle, The Vertically Challenged Vertical Challenge, The Dog Toilet Torment Challenge, Mr Shake Hands Man (Louise Redknapp), Speed Drinking
4	4	30 January 2001
The Wig Man Wager, 'Nice Lady, Nice Price', The Blessed Bucket of Bibles Bet, The Pop Prize Price Conundrum (Toyah Willcox), The Drink Of The Goths, The Celebrity Sexy Party Selection (John McCririck & Christopher Quinten), Mr Shake Hands Man (Donna Air), The Riddle Of The Talking Turkey Man, The Willy Carson [sic] Ground Touch Tournament (with Gina G)
5	5	1 February 2001
The Wonky Eye Gentleman Gamble, The Peter Purves Satanic Message Puzzle, The Floating Lady Fire Arm Flutter (Jakki Degg), Gone In Sixty Seconds, An Interesting Penalty Shootout Conundrum, The Pretend Pole Vault Puzzle, Mr Shake Hands Man (Ronan Keating & Keith Duffy), Shaun Ryder Coke Conundrum
6	6	15 February 2001
The Stringman Special Lady Friend Puzzle (Peter Stringfellow), The Old Lady Tower Of Egg Torment, The Seven Sins Of Deadliness (Peter Davison), Rubbish Clown - Rubbish Creature, Little Ted Fag Challenge, The Bachelor Bra Buy Bet, Englishman Irishman Scotsman, Mr Shake Hands Man (Declan Donnelly), The Goat Wee Wager
7	7	8 March 2001
Lying Cockney Conundrum, Andy Crane Spin Cycle Rodeo, The Gimp Watersport Battle, The Short Sighted Song Shouting Tournament, The State Sponsored Britney Bet, Mr Shake Hands Man (Floella Benjamin), Egg Smash Roulette With Go West (Peter Cox & Richard Drummie), The Battle Of The Dishonourable Motor Car Celebrity Bandits
8	8	22 February 2001
The Big Foot Lady Pleaser Poser, Tara Palmer-Tomkinson Toast Toss Test, The Persistent Adrian Mills, The Dance Of The Goths, The Mystery Fizz Can, The Chesney Choon Challenge, The Famous Person Poll Booth Poser (Shaun Ryder), Mr Shake Hands Man (Melanie Blatt), The Stupid Dog Sausage Challenge

=== Series 2 (2001) ===
No. overall	No. in series	Original release date
9	1	13 November 2001
The Four Letter Word Water Wager, Mr Shake Hands Man Two (Kelsey Grammer), The Famous Man Dingle Dangle Dilemma (Normski), The Man Monster Petrol Pump Off Puzzle (Roger De Courcey & Nookie Bear vs Keith Harris & Orville the Duck), The Mr Dean Insult Generation Game (Dean O'Loughlin), The Fantastic Elastic Band Bet, Lady One Question (June Whitfield), The Michael Jacksons Reverse Race Rendezvous
10	2	20 November 2001
A One Armed Deceitful Doctor Cow Conundrum, The Valerie Singleton Sexy Lady Party Snack Selection, Mr Shake Hands Man Two (Bill Murray), The Backwards Chinese Detective (Oliver Tobias), The New Romantic Dance Dilemma (Steve Strange), The Wheel of Misfortune, Lady One Question (Roger Moore), The Speed Soul Struggle (Lou Ferrigno)
11	3	27 November 2001
The Dirty Old Grandma Gamble, Mr Shake Hands Man Two (Angelina Jolie), The Fantastic Freddie Man Flutter, The Where's Willie Wheelie Wager (Willie Thorne), An Animal Scientific Experiment (Duncan Norvelle), The Mini Cab Monarch Mystery, Lady One Question (Chris Tarrant), The Magical News Bottom Bet (Jasmine Lowson), The Mike Gatting Glass Smash Bash Proposal
12	4	4 December 2001
The Bottomless Basic Instinct Bet, Mr Shake Hands Man Two (Jennifer Love Hewitt), The Roundabout of Righteousness Roulette, The Backwards Chinese Detective (Glen Matlock & Hugh Cornwell), The Celebrity Box of Death Dilemma (Amanda Barrie), The Little Chocolate Ball Blow Bet (Jodie Kidd & Lisa Barbuscia), Lady One Question (Jonathan Dimbleby), The Incredible Fast Food Silent Selection
13	5	11 December 2001
The Chair of Mischief Conundrum, Lady One Question (Nigella Lawson), Gone in Sixty Seconds, The Window of Wonder Watching Wager, The Lying Little Lady Puzzle, The Man of Speed Airport Carousel of Torment (Iwan Thomas), Men of God - Tongues of Fire, Mr Shake Hands Man Two (Jackie Collins), 'The Man, Dog, Stick Question' (Todd Bridges)
14	6	18 December 2001
The Hook Hand Man Piano Puzzle, Lady One Question (Terry Gilliam), The Great Grange Hill Gravy Gamble (Michael Sheard), The Mr Mark Lawrenson Big Head Bashing Bet, Mr Shake Hands Man Two (Anjelica Huston), The Shuffle of the Sinful Lady, A Very Interesting Bumper Car Question
15	7	26 December 2001
The Dog Poo Stinky Shoe Showdown, Lady One Question (Nick Ross), The Funny Man Funny Voice Conundrum (Joe Pasquale), The Fantastic Mr Mills Fast Food Flutter (Adrian Mills), The Genuine Gimp Gamble of Greatness (Penny Smith), The Ten Commandments of Modern Dance Decision, The Biscuit Boxing Championship of the World (Steve Collins & Nigel Benn), Mr Shake Hands Man Two (Thora Birch)
16	8	2 January 2002
An Interesting Painting Man Puzzle, Lady One Question (Bob Holness), The Smoking Celebrity Showdown Selection (Anne Charleston & Tommy Vance), Men of Brick War of China, The Lady Loving Lady Line Up, The Great Greek Name Game Game [sic], Mr Shake Hands Man Two (Elliott Gould), A Painful Pickled Onion Puzzle
17	9	24 December 2001
Christmas Special The Pretend Party Man Mystery, Lady One Question (John Inman), It's a Christmas Gone in Sixty Seconds, The Lonely Man Christmas Specimen Showdown, The Sexy Santa Gun Gift Selection, Mr Tony Hart's Difficult Disco Dilemma, The Seven Dwarf Dishonorable [sic] Door Deception, The Mr Biggins Backwards Satanic Christmas Message (Christopher Biggins)

=== Series 3 (2003) ===
No. overall	No. in series	Original release date
18	1	27 March 2003
A Little Boy Bra Size Bet (Janette Tough), Lady One Question (Simon Cowell), A Fascinating Door Doctor Decision (Colin Baker), A Chocolate Biscuit Gift Gamble (Dave Lee Travis), A Sucky Sucky Sportsman Showdown (Eric Bristow & Jimmy White), Lady One Answer (Helen Adams), A Crude Crop Pop Circle Conundrum (Reg Presley), Mr Boom-Tastic (Henry Cooper)
19	2	3 April 2003
Super Soccer Special A Cunning Commentary Breath Bet (Jim Rosenthal & Gerald Sinstadt), Lady One Question (Nancy Dell'Olio), Mr Cheeky Chappy Presents "It's A Celebrity Stars In My Eyes" (Barry Fry), An Amazing Escalator Tester Question (Stan Collymore), A Really Riveting Race With Genuine Babies (Rob Curling), A Sporty Answerphone Capacity Concern (Neville Southall & David Vine), How Long Left On Banzai Programme Today (Paul Durkin), A Full Time Haircut Analysis Investigation (Bob Wilson)
20	3	10 April 2003
Sponsored by Michael Berryman from The Hills Have Eyes A Genuine Dogs Dinner Dilemma (Judith Jacob, Ross Davidson, & Mark Homer), Lady One Question (Antonio Banderas), A Pretty Woman Car Proposal Puzzle (Emily Booth), Mr Keith Floyd's "The Wall", A Puzzling Playground Puzzle (John Holmes, Alison Bettles, & Peter Moran), A Genuine Cow Brain Bowling Bet, A Very Cunning Cracker Conundrum (Frank Carson)
21	4	17 April 2003
A Sexy Soapstar Sellotape Situation (Sophie Lawrence), Lady One Question (George Takei), A Satanic Celebrity Sacrifice Situation (Whigfield), Gone In 60 Seconds (Rik Waller), Mr Shake Hands Man Two (Alicia Keys), A Super Spin Showdown On The Buses, A Great Gate Gamble (Dickie Davies)
22	5	24 April 2003
A Deceitful Doctor Dilemma (Toby Anstis), Lady One Question (Gene Simmons), The Blood Let Bet With Genuine Virgins (Liza Goddard), A Very Tricky Dicky Diana Doll Decision, A Super Sick Bed Ciggie Bet (Captain Sensible), A Big Lady Big Stick Bet... With Taxis (Fatima Whitbread), Lesbian Lady Lover (Rhona Cameron), Men of Arrows - War of Toast (Cliff Lazarenko & Phil Taylor)
23	6	1 May 2003
The Cat Flap Shutter Flutter (Vanessa Feltz), Lady One Question (Nick Carter), The Man Puppet Prowler Puzzle (Keith Harris & Orville the Duck), An Interesting Good Man Bad Man Battle (Aled Jones & John McVicar), The Miniature Mr and Mrs Interesting Offspring Option, Mr Shake Hands Man Two (Adam Sandler), A Hanging Manhorse Mystery, Mr Patrick Moore's Chocolate Telescope Teaser
24	7	8 May 2003
A Baffling Briefcase Bet, A Smoking Cinema Celebrity Cigar Scenario (Rutger Hauer), Lady One Question (Samuel L. Jackson), An Interesting Pat Sharp Speed Selection, A Tricky Tiswas Touching Test (Sally James), Mr Shake Hands Man Two (Rick Allen), An 80's Revival Revolving Singer Showdown (Ben Volpeliere-Pierrot & Mark Shaw), A Bed Time Bet
25	8	15 May 2003
A Birthday Boy Bra Decision, Lady One Question (Graham Norton), The Fantastic Frisbee Ding Dong Duel, A High-Rise Lift Question With Celebrity People (Mark Owen & Howard Lew Lewis), Secret Insults To English People (Dougie Donnelly), The Trial Of The Tempting Turkey Tree (Peter Duncan), A Fantastic Fast Fingering Flutter (Mike Lindup & Rick Wakeman)

== Merchandise ==
=== Book ===
Book	Year published	Publisher	Cover photo	Notes	Ref
Banzai Book of Betting	11 October 2002	Channel 4 Books	Mr Banzai (Masashi Fujimoto) in a fighting stance, with Banzai logo.	Paperback	

=== VHS ===
Release name	Release date	Classification	Publisher	Format	Language	Subtitles	Notes	Ref
Super Banzai Video Show	4 November 2002	15	Universal Pictures	PAL	English	None	Released in the United Kingdom.	

=== DVD ===
Title	Region 1	Region 2	Region 4	Notes	Ref
Super Banzai Video Show	-	11 November 2002	-	One Disc	

Contains best bets from first and second series and also unseen bets. Includes a Banzai screensaver for Windows and MacOS.

In Super Banzai Video Show, players could play Banzai with the DVD player and the remote. Mr Banzai shocks viewers by jumping in front of the copyright warning at the beginning of the disc. Players are then asked to guess which letter is the Super-Banzai DVD button, A, B or C. If viewers select the wrong option, they see about long sections of Tony Hart or Erik Estrada standing staring at them.

Best Bets	The Man Monster Petrol Pump Off Puzzle (Roger De Courcey & Nookie Bear vs Keith Harris & Orville the Duck), Squirrel Fishing, The Lonely Man Christmas Specimen Showdown, The Famous Man Dingle Dangle Dilemma (Normski), The Mr Dean Insult Generation Game (Dean O'Loughlin), Old Lady Wheelchair Chicken Challenge, A Very Interesting Beefeater Investigation Question, The Old Lady Fish Man Challenge (Fish), The Speed Soul Struggle (Lou Ferrigno), The Peter Purves Satanic Message Puzzle, The Blessed Bucket of Bibles Bet, Mr Shake Hands Man (Anna Nolan), Mr Shake Hands Man Two (Kelsey Grammer & Bill Murray), Lady One Question (June Whitfield, Bob Holness, & John Inman), The Lying Breast Puzzle, The Celebrity Sexy Party Selection (John McCririck & Christopher Quinten), The Dirty Old Grandma Gamble, The Miniature Mr and Mrs Interesting Offspring Option, The Wheel Of Misfortune, The Fantastic Freddie Man Flutter, Ye Olde Supermarket Trolley Jousting Tournament, A Very Tricky Dicky Diana Doll Decision, The Genital Wedge Gamble (Peter Dean), The Four Letter Word Water Wager
Unseen Bets	An Interesting Doggie Death Dilemma, A Very Difficult Dummy Decision, The Wheel of Misfortune Insect Roulette

=== DVD betting game ===
RDF, the licence-holder of "Banzai", has also worked in conjunction with Screenlife, the makers of the popular Scene It? DVD games, to make possible the creation of a DVD board game for the show (Banzai.com). Board game creators Gary McGrew and Nick Saad can be seen as animated figures in the "How to Play" section of the DVD. The game DVD is packed with many of the best clips from the programme and uses plastic sushi pieces as the main betting and winning device.

Players must use chopsticks to transfer four types of bizarre sushi characters (King Fu Carl – the world's last starfish assassin, Lois – the Louisiana Squirrel Roll, Chum and Tako's Tentacle) into the main community betting bowl. Whoever transfers the most for that round gets to put down a numbered or lettered betting card in conjunction with the "Banzai" clip in the hopes of getting it right and winning all the sushi in the community bowl.

The player with the most sushi wins the game. The "underground" appeal of the show and the game has also contributed to drinking game rules. The show's MC, Mr Banzai, also starred in the making of the DVD as the man who jumped out and shouted "DVD!" and did a number of comical things on the DVD.

Banzai – DVD Betting Game was released 16 September 2011

=== Soundtrack ===
The Banzai soundtrack was released by 4Music 18 June 2001 on CD.

Original track listing
No.	Title	Length
1.	"Theme from Enter the Dragon – Lalo Schifrin"
2.	"I Saw the Light – Todd Rundgren"
3.	"Oh Lori – Alessi Brothers"
4.	"Avenues and Alleyways – Tony Christie"
5.	"Stay on these Roads – a-Ha"
6.	"Adding N to X – Add N to (X)"
7.	"Kites – Simon Dupree and the Big Sound"
8.	"When You’re in Love with a Beautiful Woman – Dr. Hook & the Medicine Show"
9.	"Egyptian Reggae – Jonathan Richman & the Modern Lovers"
10.	"Holiday Rap – MC Miker G & DJ Sven"
11.	"Sleepy Shores – Cyril Stapleton & his Orchestra"
12.	"Seasons in the Sun – Terry Jacks"
13.	"Spanish Stroll – Mink DeVille"
14.	"Chanson D’Amour – The Manhattan Transfer"
15.	"The Look of Love – Dusty Springfield"
16.	"Music – John Miles"
17.	"Dancing Lonely Night – The Jaguars"
