= Harry McShane (footballer) =

Scottish footballer

Personal information
- Full name: Harold McShane
- Date of birth: 8 April 1920
- Place of birth: Holytown, Lanarkshire, Scotland
- Date of death: 12 November 2012 (aged 92)
- Place of death: Manchester, England
- Height: 5 ft 8 in (1.73 m)
- Position: Winger

Youth career
- Bellshill Athletic

Senior career*
| Years | Team | Apps | (Gls) |
| 1937–1946 | Blackburn Rovers | 2 | (0) |
| 1946–1947 | Huddersfield Town | 15 | (1) |
| 1947–1950 | Bolton Wanderers | 93 | (6) |
| 1950–1954 | Manchester United | 56 | (8) |
| 1954–1955 | Oldham Athletic | 41 | (5) |
- Chorley
- Wellington Town
- Droylsden
| Total | | 207 | (20) |
- * Club domestic league appearances and goals

Harold McShane (8 April 1920 – 12 November 2012) was a Scottish professional footballer who played as a winger. He was the father of actor Ian McShane.

McShane began his professional career with Blackburn Rovers. After the Second World War he turned out for Huddersfield Town, Bolton Wanderers, Manchester United, Oldham Athletic, Chorley, Wellington Town, and Droylsden. He scored 20 goals in 207 league games in the Football League, and won the First Division title with Manchester United in 1951–52. He worked at Old Trafford after his retirement, spending a period as the stadium's announcer.

== Career ==
Born in Holytown, North Lanarkshire, McShane started his football career as an amateur with Bellshill Athletic before turning professional at Blackburn Rovers in April 1937. During the Second World War, he guested for Manchester City, Blackpool, Reading and Port Vale.

After the war ended, he joined Huddersfield Town. He made 15 appearances in the First Division in the 1946–47 season, scoring one goal in a 5–2 win over Derby County at Leeds Road on 11 September. After recovering from a broken arm, he moved on to league rivals Bolton Wanderers in 1947.

Walter Rowley's "Trotters" finished in 17th place in 1947–48, 14th place in 1948–49, and 16th place in 1949–50. He scored six goals in 93 league games during his spell at Burnden Park. McShane joined Manchester United in exchange for defender John Ball and £5,000 in September 1950. He was signed to replace the departing Charlie Mitten. He scored seven goals in 31 appearances in the 1950–51 season, as the "Red Devils" finished second in the league. His first goal at Old Trafford came on 7 October 1950, in a 3–1 win over Sheffield Wednesday. He was part of the United side that won the First Division title in 1951–52, scoring one goal in 12 league games. His goal was an important one, as it came against rivals Manchester City in a 2–1 win at Maine Road on 15 September. He then struggled with a cartilage injury, and appeared just five times in the 1952–53 campaign, as Matt Busby's side dropped to eighth place.

McShane failed to break into the first-team in the 1953–54 season, and in February 1954, was transferred to George Hardwick's Oldham Athletic for £750. The "Latics" were relegated out of the Second Division at the end of the 1953–54 season, and then finished tenth in the Third Division North in 1954–55. McShane scored five goals in 41 league games at Boundary Park.

He later played non-League football for Chorley (as a player-coach), Wellington Town, and Droylsden.

== Later life ==
After retiring as a player, McShane became the coach of Stalybridge Celtic. He then worked as a scout for Manchester United, where he was credited with bringing Wes Brown to the management's attention. He was also an announcer at Old Trafford during the 1960s. He died in November 2012, aged 92, after suffering from Alzheimer's disease. His son, actor Ian McShane, accepted a 1951–52 league winners medal when English Football League rule changes in 2023 meant that his father could be awarded with a medal.

== Career statistics ==
Appearances and goals by club, season and competition
| Club | Season | League | | | FA Cup | | Total | |
| Club | Season | Division | Apps | Goals | Apps | Goals | Apps | Goals |
|---|---|---|---|---|---|---|---|---|
| Blackburn Rovers | 1937–38 | Second Division | 2 | 0 | 0 | 0 | 2 | 0 |
| Huddersfield Town | 1946–47 | First Division | 15 | 1 | 0 | 0 | 15 | 1 |
| Bolton Wanderers | 1947–48 | First Division | 12 | 0 | 0 | 0 | 12 | 0 |
| Bolton Wanderers | 1948–49 | First Division | 36 | 2 | 3 | 0 | 39 | 2 |
| Bolton Wanderers | 1949–50 | First Division | 40 | 4 | 3 | 1 | 43 | 5 |
| Bolton Wanderers | 1950–51 | First Division | 5 | 0 | 0 | 0 | 5 | 0 |
| Bolton Wanderers | Total | | 93 | 6 | 6 | 1 | 99 | 7 |
| Manchester United | 1950–51 | First Division | 30 | 7 | 1 | 0 | 31 | 7 |
| Manchester United | 1951–52 | First Division | 12 | 1 | 0 | 0 | 12 | 1 |
| Manchester United | 1952–53 | First Division | 5 | 0 | 0 | 0 | 5 | 0 |
| Manchester United | 1953–54 | First Division | 9 | 0 | 0 | 0 | 9 | 0 |
| Manchester United | Total | | 56 | 8 | 1 | 0 | 57 | 8 |
| Oldham Athletic | 1953–54 | Second Division | 13 | 0 | 0 | 0 | 13 | 0 |
| Oldham Athletic | 1954–55 | Third Division North | 28 | 5 | 1 | 1 | 29 | 6 |
| Oldham Athletic | Total | | 41 | 5 | 1 | 1 | 42 | 6 |
| Career total | | | 207 | 20 | 8 | 2 | 215 | 22 |

== Honours ==
Manchester United

- Football League First Division: 1951–52
