= Orville the Duck =

Famous ventriloquist puppet

- Keith Harris and Orville performing "Orville's Song" in 1982
- Created by: Keith Harris
- Portrayed by: Keith Harris

In-universe information
- Species: Duck
- Gender: Male

Orville the Duck was the most famous puppet used by British ventriloquist Keith Harris (1947–2015). Named after Orville Wright (one of the Wright Brothers), he is a green duckling who wears a nappy with a large safety pin on the front. He speaks with a falsetto Lancashire accent.

== Appearances ==
=== Television ===
Orville appeared on BBC television from 1982 to 1990 on The Keith Harris Show, which featured assorted puppets such as Orville the Duck and Cuddles the Monkey. At the peak of their popularity in December 1982, Harris and Orville released the single "Orville's Song", reaching number 4 in the UK Singles Chart in January 1983 and selling over 400,000 copies in total.

After The Keith Harris Show ended in 1990, Harris took up work for Butlins holiday resorts.

Orville and Harris had a short appearance on the sketch comedy series Little Britain as themselves in a group of entertainers waiting to meet the royal family. In another episode, Orville was portrayed as an out-of-work actor shopping at a supermarket, played by Matt Lucas, dressed as an oversized version of Orville, and had a regularly pitched voice. Harris and Orville also made an appearance on Channel Four's Banzai.

In 2005, both Harris and Orville appeared in the Channel 5 reality TV show, The Farm and went on to win it. They also appeared in the video for Tony Christie's "Is This the Way to Amarillo", which was re-released in that year. In May 2009, they made a cameo appearance on the BBC drama Ashes to Ashes, set in November 1982.

In October 2012 and December 2013, Orville appeared with Harris on Pointless Celebrities.

=== Advertisements ===
In 2004, Harris provided Orville's personality in an advert for Surf washing powder. Harris, in an attempt to broaden the horizons of his original stage show, also toured with a more adult offering entitled Duck Off.

There were two Orville puppets that Harris used, one manual, one a radio-controlled animatronic version. The original Orville puppet is insured for £100,000.

In February 2012, Orville featured in a giffgaff advert.

== Retirement ==
Harris died of cancer on 28 April 2015 and his agent confirmed that Orville would be retired and would never appear in public again. The puppet was left to Harris' long time friend, ventriloquist Steve Hewlett, who subsequently donated it to the Grand Order of Water Rats Museum.
