= Neil Dudgeon =

English actor

- Born: 2 January 1961 (age 65); Doncaster, West Riding of Yorkshire, England
- Education: Intake Secondary Modern School; University of Bristol
- Occupation: Actor
- Years active: 1987–present
- Known for: Midsomer Murders (2002, 2010–present)
- Spouse: Mary Peate
- Children: 2

Neil Dudgeon (born 2 January 1961) is an English actor who, since 2010, has played DCI John Barnaby in the ITV drama series Midsomer Murders. He replaced John Nettles in the lead role in 2011.

== Early life and education ==
Dudgeon is the son of James C Dudgeon and June M Weeks. He has an older sister, Lynn W Dudgeon. He was born in Doncaster in 1961, where he was raised. At that time, it was a part of the West Riding of Yorkshire, but is now in South Yorkshire. He attended Intake Secondary Modern school in Doncaster, among other schools. He acted in several school plays, (including Rosencrantz and Guildenstern Are Dead), then went on to study drama at the University of Bristol (1979–82).

== Career ==
Dudgeon made his first screen appearance in 1987. The following year, he appeared as a Second World War pilot in Piece of Cake, alongside Tim Woodward, Jeremy Northam and Nathaniel Parker.

As well as occasional appearances in series such as Casualty, London's Burning and Lovejoy, he appeared in 1994 as Detective Constable Costello, a one-episode subordinate to Detective Inspector William Edward "Jack" Frost (played by David Jason), in the TV series A Touch of Frost, in 1998-99 as George the Chauffeur in The Mrs Bradley Mysteries (alongside Dame Diana Rigg), in Inspector Morse (episode "The Way Through the Woods"), Between The Lines, Common As Muck (in 1994 & 1997), Out of the Blue, Sherlock Holmes and the Case of the Silk Stocking, The Street and four series of Messiah with Ken Stott.

He also appeared in the romantic comedy film Bridget Jones: The Edge of Reason, playing the taxi driver who takes the title character to meet Mark Darcy (played by Colin Firth) towards the end of the film.

In 2007, Dudgeon appeared in the eponymous role of self-made millionaire Roman Pretty in the BBC2 sitcom Roman's Empire. From 2009 to 2011, he played a main character in BBC's Life of Riley. The same month the final season of Life of Riley aired, Dudgeon played the role of one time Football League secretary Alan Hardaker in the TV drama United, which centered on the events of the 1958 Munich air disaster involving Manchester United.

In 2010, Dudgeon appeared in an episode of the ITV crime drama Midsomer Murders called "The Sword of Guillaume". He was introduced in the episode as the cousin of Detective Chief Inspector Tom Barnaby, played by John Nettles, who retired from the role. Dudgeon, also cast as a senior detective, took over as the lead character in Midsomer Murders after the last episodes featuring John Nettles were screened in 2011. As of 2025 his tenure on the show has surpassed John Nettles', but he has not appeared in as many episodes. Dudgeon's character name is DCI John Barnaby, which has been suggested may be a vehicle for continued sales to territories where the show is known as "Inspector Barnaby". Dudgeon had first appeared in Midsomer Murders in the opening episode of the fourth series ("Garden of Death"), playing a secondary character.

In 2012, Dudgeon starred as Norman Birkett on BBC Radio 4's Afternoon Play series in four plays written by Caroline and David Stafford, based on Birkett's cases.

== Personal life ==
Dudgeon is married to BBC Radio producer Mary Peate. They have two children.

== Filmography ==
=== Film ===
| Year | Title | Role | Notes |
|---|---|---|---|
| 1989 | Red King White Knight | Russian Defector Vlasek | |
| 1987 | Prick Up Your Ears | Policeman | |
| 1990 | Fools of Fortune | Sergeant Rudkin | |
| 1996 | Different for Girls | Neil Payne | |
| 2000 | It Was an Accident | Holdsworth | |
| 2004 | Bridget Jones: The Edge of Reason | Taxi Driver | |
| 2007 | Son of Rambow | Joshua | |

=== Television ===
| Year | Title | Role | Notes |
|---|---|---|---|
| 1987–1990 | ScreenPlay | Crowson / Brink | 2 episodes |
| 1987 | London's Burning | Gary Woods | 1 episode |
| 1988 | Piece of Cake | 'Moggy' Cattermole | 6 episodes |
| 1989 | Saracen | Jimmy | 1 episode |
| 1989 | Red King, White Knight | Vlasek | TV movie |
| 1990 | Alive from Off Center | Brink | 1 episode |
| 1991 | Lovejoy | DS Graham Bentley | 1 episode |
| 1991 | Casualty | Mick | 1 episode |
| 1991 | The Bill | Stanley Houseman | 1 episode |
| 1992 | Resnick: Lonely Hearts | William Doria | 2 episodes |
| 1992 | Between the Lines | D.S. Alan Hanson | 1 episode |
| 1993 | Sharpe's Eagle | Gibbons | TV movie |
| 1993 | Resnick: Rough Treatment | William Doria | TV movie |
| 1994 | A Touch of Frost | DC Costello | 1 episode |
| 1994 | Screen Two | Priest | 1 episode |
| 1994 | Fatherland | Sex Crimes Cop | TV movie |
| 1994–1997 | Common As Muck | Ken Andrews | 12 episodes |
| 1995 | The All New Alexei Sayle Show | Himself | 3 episodes |
| 1995 | Inspector Morse | David Michaels | 1 episode |
| 1995–1996 | Out of the Blue | D.C. Marty Brazil | 12 episodes |
| 1997 | Breakout | Dr. Neil McFarlane | TV movie |
| 1997 | The History of Tom Jones, a Foundling | Puppeteer's Assistant | 1 episode |
| 1998–2000 | The Mrs Bradley Mysteries | George Moody | 5 episodes |
| 1998–2000 | The Canterbury Tales | The Miller | 2 episodes |
| 1999 | Four Fathers | Vince Yallop | 3 Episodes |
| 2000 | Midsomer Murders | Daniel Bolt | Episode: "Garden of Death" |
| 2001–2005 | Messiah | Duncan Warren | 2 episodes |
| 2002 | Murder in Mind | Edward Buttimore | 1 episode |
| 2004 | Sherlock Holmes and the Case of the Silk Stocking | Lestrade | TV movie |
| 2005 | Rose and Maloney | Alan Richmond | 1 episode |
| 2006 | The Lavender List | Joe Haines | TV movie |
| 2006 | The Street | Brian Peterson | 4 episodes |
| 2006 | Sorted | Harry Goodwin | 6 episodes |
| 2007 | Coming Up | Doctor | 1 episode |
| 2007 | Roman's Empire | Roman Pretty | 4 episodes |
| 2007 | Coming Down the Mountain | John Philips | TV movie |
| 2007 | Most Evil | Narrator | 3 episodes |
| 2008 | Silent Witness | Det-Supt. Paul Barker / Det Supt Paul Barker | 2 episodes |
| 2008 | Survivors | Sean | 1 episode |
| 2009 | Kingdom | Terry | 1 episode |
| 2009–2011 | Life of Riley | Jim Riley | 20 episodes |
| 2010 | The Nativity | Joachim | 3 episodes |
| 2011 | United | Alan Hardaker | TV movie |
| 2010– | Midsomer Murders | DCI John Barnaby | Series 13 (guest); Series 14–present (regular role) |
| 2012 | The Charles Dickens Show | Lord Shaftesbury | 1 episode |
| 2013 | Playhouse Presents | Jim | 1 episode |
