= Alan Hardaker =

English football administrator

Alan Hardaker OBE
Personal information
- Date of birth: 29 July 1912
- Place of birth: Hull, England
- Date of death: 4 March 1980 (aged 67)
- Place of death: England
- Position: Full back

Senior career*
Years	Team	Apps	(Gls)
1929–1939	Hull City	0	(0)
- Bridlington Central United
- Yorkshire Amateur
- * Club domestic league appearances and goals

Alan Hardaker OBE (29 July 1912 − 4 March 1980) was an English football administrator for the Football League, a wartime Royal Navy officer, and previously an amateur footballer. He was born in Hull, Yorkshire and was the second son to John and Emma Hardaker. He was younger brother of Ernest Hardaker.

== Education and early career ==
Hardaker's education began at Constable Street Elementary School in Hull, and from there he was awarded a scholarship to Riley High School, leaving in 1928 with qualifications in typing and shorthand. He initially went into the family removals and haulage business, until he was sacked in 1929 by his own father for playing dominoes instead of working. He was able to use his qualifications to find immediate employment as an office junior in the Town Clerk's department at the Hull Guildhall.

He met Irene Mundy when he was 17 and she was a year younger. They married eight years later in North Ferriby church. They would go on to have four daughters and many grandchildren.

He had first taken up playing football at the high school, and so joined Municipal Sports, the Guildhall team. He was sent off on one occasion during his time with them, for retaliation. Playing in the centre forward position, he scored 100 goals in three seasons, although he claimed that most of these were only possible due to the quality of those playing alongside him.

After moving on to East Riding County League champions Beverley White Star (now defunct), he was invited by Hull City to play for their reserve side against Bradford Park Avenue Reserves. He had been converted to full back by this time, and that was the position he took up for the Hull City Reserves. From then on, he played for one or other of the teams on a regular basis for the next three seasons.

In 1935, he captained the East Riding County FA representative team when they won the Northern Counties Amateur Championship.

He was offered professional terms in 1936 by manager Jack Hill, which he turned down, as by the age of 23 he had progressed to become Lord Mayor's secretary at the Guildhall. After then playing eleven games for the Reserves in the Midland League, and coinciding with a change in team management, he was released by the club. He went on to play for Bridlington Central United (later known as Bridlington Town) of the East Riding Amateur League, and then moved to the Yorkshire Amateur Football Club in the Yorkshire League.

== World War II ==
Both his sporting career and his professional life were interrupted by the imminent outbreak of the Second World War in 1939, and in his official capacity as Lord Mayor's secretary he was asked to help start the Humber Division of the Royal Naval Volunteer Reserve (RNVR) in readiness for hostilities. He joined them on 12 June 1939, as a Paymaster Lieutenant initially assigned to the light cruiser HMS Calcutta moored in Hull docks. However, after the war began, he was transferred to HMS Newcastle, based at Scapa Flow and saw service on the "Northern Patrol", which protected convoys of Allied ships from German vessels sent to attack.

In 1942, after subsequently serving on HMS Cumberland, he became a lieutenant commander, and transferred, this time to the decommissioned torpedo training ship HMS Marlborough secured at Eastbourne. He then received a posting to Australia as supply officer to HMS Alert, a shore-based camp in Sydney, and in December 1944 moved on to HMS Golden Hind, a Royal Navy manning depot, also in Sydney.

Whilst in Australia, he resumed his sporting career, captaining the Royal Navy football side in organised matches for a single season. Hardaker remained in Australia until the end of the war, eventually deciding to retire from playing at the age of 34.

== Career ==
Following his return to Britain, Hardaker fulfilled the temporary position of clerk to the Education Committee back at Hull Guildhall, due to his previous job being already occupied. When he was refused permission to resume his post as Lord Mayor's secretary in Hull, he applied for an identical appointment in Portsmouth and was successful at interview. He and his young family moved there in August 1946. In 1950, he was removed from the active list of the Royal Naval Volunteer Reserve at his own request.

In 1951, Portsmouth manager Bob Jackson got in touch with Hardaker to say that Fred Howarth, the Football League secretary, was considering retiring from the job, and recommended that he apply. Vernon Stokes, the chairman of Portsmouth at that time, also urged him to apply. Stokes later became chairman of the Football Association Disciplinary Committee.

Seen to be answering an advertisement in The Daily Telegraph newspaper inviting applications, he sent his application to the Football League headquarters in Starkie Street, Preston. The Management Committee of the League drew up a shortlist of six candidates, which included Hardaker, from an initial response of 410 applicants.

On 1 May 1951, he accepted the invitation to replace Howarth, although this was not to formally happen for another five and a half years, due to the seeming reluctance of Howarth to actually retire. Hardaker took up a junior position during this period, at a much-reduced salary and receiving only a small pay rise each year thereafter. He later indicated in his autobiography that he felt "badly let down" by Arthur Drewry, the League President at that time.

Eventually, on 5 July 1955, he was confirmed as assistant secretary to Fred Howarth. Hardaker had used the intervening time to read every archived document since 1888 which related to the League and its business and was better prepared to take on the top job.

On New Year's Eve 1956, Howarth deposited his work keys on Hardaker's desk and left the building for the last time, after 23 years' service. On 6 January 1957 Hardaker was appointed by the Management Committee as the new Football League secretary.

== As Football League secretary ==
One major change which took place at the Football League two years after Hardaker's appointment was a shift in location for the organisation's headquarters. The Starkie Street premises were little more than a converted town house, and the incoming League President at that time, Joe Richards, decided to ask Hardaker to look for more appropriate offices outside Preston.

The unanimous choice, after consideration of Blackpool and Leamington Spa as possibilities, was the former Sandown Hotel in Clifton Drive, Lytham St Annes, Lancashire, and this was purchased for £11,000. Hardaker was heavily involved in the six-month renovation of the building to make it suitable for purpose, and this was completed at a total cost of £40,000. The previous premises sold for £3,250.

When Hardaker first joined the staff of the League, they numbered six full-time employees. As a measure of the expansion and diversification achieved during his time as secretary, by 1977 this had increased to 25. He enjoyed the complete confidence of the Management Committee and was delegated by them many powers to act independently concerning certain matters. In his autobiography, he claims that, due to this measure of autonomy, he was perceived as "arrogant and high-handed" and had "frequently been called a dictator" by some club officials. He maintained that his "one aim" in football had always been to "see the League prosper".

Following the passing of the Copyright Act 1956, he suggested to the Management Committee that the lists of League fixtures published each year should be subject to copyright for use by companies such as football pools promoters. He was duly given approval to implement a test case against Littlewoods Pools in 1959, and this the League won, meaning that a source of income would be secured for the clubs, as the Pools companies now needed to pay for the privilege of printing the fixtures on their coupons.

Hardaker was also required to attend the House of Commons in London to address members of Parliament regarding the abolition of the maximum wage for football players, which Jimmy Hill, the ex-Fulham player and then chairman of the Professional Footballers' Association, had led a campaign for. The PFA won their members' pay freedom in 1961. However, this did not affect the transfer system, which still allowed clubs to retain players' registrations even after their contracts had expired.

When an application to the High Court was made in June 1963, submitted by the out-of-contract Newcastle United player George Eastham, Hardaker was called to give evidence. Despite him arguing in favour of the contract structure as it then was (the League Management Committee had instructed him in how he should proceed), Eastham won his case and thereafter the players could move more easily from club to club.

Hardaker was instrumental in designing the 1957 "Pattern of Football", which would have seen the existing 92 clubs, then occupying the four divisions of the League, increased to 100, with 20 teams in each of five divisions. The purpose of this was to reduce the number of weeks in the football season, allowing for less fixture congestion. At the same time, there would be more opportunity to accommodate extra competitions, such as the Football League Cup, which had been introduced during the 1960–61 season. The proposal was defeated after a vote by the member clubs, and the Pattern was discarded.

Although it is widely reported that the League Cup was Hardaker's idea, in his autobiography he credits Stanley Rous, who was at that time secretary of the Football Association. He relates the tale of the Post-War Reconstruction Committee, which was a joint exercise by the FA and League to help regenerate football in England at the end of the Second World War. Rous apparently designed a separate knockout competition, to be entered by those clubs beaten in the early rounds of the FA Cup proper, but the plan was never approved. It was this idea, in tandem with the blueprint of the already implemented Scottish League Cup north of the border, which prompted Hardaker to formulate the English League Cup.

The League Cup was poorly received when it was first announced. Hardaker said that the proposed competition received criticism not only from Fleet Street, but from the League clubs themselves - entry into the competition was not compulsory, and Arsenal, Luton Town, Sheffield Wednesday, West Bromwich Albion, Wolverhampton Wanderers and Tottenham Hotspur all refused to participate during the inaugural season.

However, the signing of television contracts for the 1961–62 competition, and the money this would generate, helped persuade many of the boycotters to take part the following year, although various clubs still declined to enter each year. The award by UEFA of a European cup competition place for the winner of the League Cup each year, plus the attraction of Wembley as a final venue, were also strong incentives for all the clubs to join, and this was achieved by 1967.

A much-quoted line from Alan Hardaker goes: "The FA Cup is football's Ascot, the League Cup its equivalent of Derby Day at Epsom".

Hardaker was asked to give advice to the League clubs when they were ordered by the FA in 1965 to sign statutory declarations regarding payments to amateur players and guarantee that no illegal dealings were being entered into, and thus leaving themselves legally vulnerable. His advice consisted of a recommendation that they (the League clubs) resign from the Football Association "as a matter of extreme urgency", in order to force the FA to back down on the issue. Having held a meeting in Manchester, they duly handed in their resignations, all except for a few unnamed clubs.

After a meeting between the Football League Management Committee and the FA in London, the demand for professional clubs to sign the declarations was withdrawn, and it was decided that only amateur clubs would be required to do so. The resignations were ignored.

In 1970, when a group of Midlands club chairmen proposed that the Football League handle its own disciplinary affairs, Hardaker was asked by them if this would be possible under FA regulations. He pointed out Association Rule 1(b), which gave provision for the game to be administered for amateur and professional clubs separately. This meant that the League could have full control of its own administration but would stop short of a breakaway from the FA. Although the rule was never implemented, when the League Management Committee raised the matter with the FA, they were able to negotiate many concessions, both financial and in terms of the disciplinary system, which changed as a result.

Many other incidents of note came under his influence during his time as Football League secretary. In 1969, he was asked to comment on the planned introduction of pensions for those professional players over 35 years of age; he claimed that the reported comment "I wouldn't hang a dog on the evidence of people like that" was actually in answer to the proposal that former professional footballers should sit on disciplinary committees and not about pensions.

At the start of the 1971–72 season, the League Management Committee issued a directive reminding referees of their obligations regarding maintaining discipline on the field of play. However, the Committee neglected to circulate the information to the press or the League clubs and there was widespread confusion when referees vastly increased the number of cautions and dismissals during matches.

The threat of withdrawal of League clubs from the FA Cup in 1973, following an argument over the fee for televising the 1972 European Championship (qualifying) quarter-final first leg between England and West Germany, was eventually averted.

Television companies made several attempts to secure contracts with the Football League to show football matches live, in 1955, 1956 and 1967, but this would never happen in Hardaker's lifetime, and he explained that in his opinion, "regular live football would undermine the game's health". Before the start of the 1974–75 season, there was even the possibility that no League football highlights would appear on television, due to the League chairmen initially rejecting a three-year deal in 1973, worth £750,000. After protracted negotiation, they finally accepted the offer.

In 1976, there was friction over the handling of the playing registration of ex-Manchester United and Northern Ireland international George Best, following his transfer from Los Angeles Aztecs of the United States to Fulham. It was discovered that, due to the terms of the contract and the method of registration, Aztecs might retain first call on Best. Hardaker acted to counter this situation "to protect the interests of all the Football League clubs".

== Honours ==
On 12 June 1971 he was made a civil Officer of the Order of the British Empire, in recognition of his services to the League.

== Controversy ==
Hardaker was known for his insular thinking. It was his decision to boycott Chelsea's attempt to enter the first ever European Cup competition in 1955 when Secretary of the Football League. He claimed that European football had "too many wops and dagoes", which he conveyed to a Times journalist.

In February 1958, Hardaker ordered Manchester United to return from Belgrade after their European Cup match on 5 February to fulfil their First Division match against Wolverhampton Wanderers on 8 February, threatening to deduct points from the club if they failed to do so. On 6 February, 23 people, including eight of the team's players, were killed in what became known as the Munich air disaster.

During the 1960s and 1970s Hardaker had a bitter relationship with Leeds United manager Don Revie, during the club's ten-year pursuit of domestic and European honours. Revie and his team frequently ran afoul of Hardaker's demanding fixture schedules and autocratic rule as secretary of the Football League. The acrimony between Revie and Hardaker continued when Revie took up the post as England national manager; Revie often protested bitterly to Hardaker against the Football League's rigid fixture schedules, which he claimed were "outdated" compared to other countries and negated any effort to establish a successful national team.

== Later years ==
In 1977, Hardaker published his autobiography, Hardaker of the League, which he co-wrote with former BBC Radio football correspondent Bryon Butler and in 1979 he was made Director General of the Football League, remaining in the role until his sudden death from a heart attack in 1980.

The Alan Hardaker Trophy was commissioned in 1990 as the award to be presented to the "man of the match" at each subsequent League Cup final. Hardaker's great-grandson, Tom Coyle, presented the trophy at the 2004 final between Bolton Wanderers and Middlesbrough.

In 2011, Hardaker was portrayed by actor Neil Dudgeon in United, a BBC TV drama centred on the 1958 Munich air disaster involving Manchester United.
