= Bargain-Loving Brits in the Sun =

- Country of origin: United Kingdom
- Original language: English
- No. of series: 12 (plus 4 for the UK version)

Production
- Running time: 1 hour (including adverts)
- Production companies: Blakeway North (2016–2020); Red Sauce (2020–)

Original release
- Network: 5
- Release: January 5, 2016 – present

Bargain-Loving Brits... is a television brand encompassing a number of series airing on Channel 5. As of April 2024, the channel are broadcasting a series set in Spain under the title Bargain-Loving Brits in the Sun each weekday afternoon, with a British holiday series called Bargain-Loving Brits by the Sea, also commissioned by the channel from Zinc Media’s factual label Red Sauce.

== Production ==
John Thomson is the show's narrator. The show is produced by television production company Zinc Media Group's label Red Sauce. In 2022, 22 million people watched Bargain-Loving Brits.

== Premise ==
The observational television series profiles British expatriates to the Costa Blanca, Costa del Sol and Romería de El Rocío in coastal Spain. The subjects are shown trying to keep within their means. They consume lager, manage animal shelters, and perform drag.

== History ==
The first series debuted on Channel 5 as an eight-part primetime production based in Benidorm, with a cast that included Graham 'Happy Days' Boland, the drag artist Dusty Crack and various residents of the Villamar campsite. At this point, the programme offered a number of handy guides to living a cost-effective life on the Costa Blanca, with segments such as their 'Top Ten Guide to Living in Benidorm on the Cheap'.

In the first and third episode of the 2019 season, the couple Jose and Jan, who had worked for Harrods as a florist, have managed the Costa del Sol animal shelter Animals in Distress for more than 15 years. They provide shelter for 60 dogs. The 2019 season's fourth episode covers Andy Wainwright, an antique dealer who had moved from Wollaton to Costa del Sol 15 years prior. Every day for a month, Wainwright is filmed as he attempts to locate treasured yet discarded items.

In 2020, the series was being filmed around Benidorm and Malaga, with Saydo Parks in Mollina being one of the main location places, in addition to Camping Villamar, Camping Benisol, and Camping Villasol from the other series In addition to this, Bargain-Loving Brits in the Sun was recommissioned as a 40-part series to run every weekday at 4pm with the working title Bargain Loving Brits In The Sun - Costa Living. Where previous series have been made up of around eight-to-ten episodes going out on Sunday nights, this series was due to run in the afternoon slot for most of the year round, with the new series alternating with repeated episodes from previous Benidorm and Blackpool series. When the daytime series turned up of Channel 5 it had dropped the Costa Living subtitle and had just become part of the main show, bringing the episode count to around 100 episodes (over the first eight series there were 60 episodes including a Christmas Special).

After ordering 46 new episodes of Bargain-Loving Brits in the Sun in 2022, the channel recommissioned the show in 2023 with an order totalling 136 episodes. Even though this order included 16 episodes to be broadcast in peak-time, only three episodes of series 11 were broadcast in this timeslot, including a tribute to the late Graham 'Happy Days' Boland. Instead of broadcasting the next episode in its 8pm Sunday night slot, the show was replaced in the schedule with a repeat of Greggs: What's Really in it? with Grace Dent. Nevertheless, the rest of the primetime series 11 episodes were moved into the daytime slot to run back-to-back with the episodes commissioned for that timeslot. In 2024 the cast included Ding Dong Val, the Avon sales lady, ex-haulage contractor Uncle Ron, who was now getting into the bar business in Benidorm, pitmaster Chunkz (Paul Devlin) from barbecue business The Saucy Pig, holiday park representative Bambi Dhami, part-time drag queen Colin ‘Coco’ Brown, seen performing his act by night and at the animal rescue centre he runs with his Spanish partner Sebastian in Murcia during the day, Nigel the Benidorm TikTok Guide and drag duo Wayne and Des.

Series 12 debuted in September 2024 in a 4pm slot with the cast including Welsh singer Laura Elen, bar owner Simon Dearing and JoJo Love. In October 2024, the series was recommissioned for another 80 episodes, with the show still being produced for Channel 5 by Red Sauce/Zinc Media Group.

== Bargain-Loving Brits by the Sea ==
This is the British seaside version of the main Spanish show. It started off as Bargain-Loving Brits in Blackpool in 2017 before locations on the east coast of England were added for following series under the amended title. Over the series, cast members have included impresario Simon Green, aka Betty Legs Diamond, Kurt and Lisa Walsh from The Crypt on Blackpool's Birley Street, the residents of residents at Merlewood Caravan Park, Neville Henshaw and Loraine Parker's Beeston Lodge Hotel, a Rock 'n' Roll-inspired B&B in Skegness, which featured one of the last TV appearances by comedian Duncan Norvelle, Phil Charles and Adam Tugwell's Dr Who-inspired B&B in Blackpool, Daisy and Matt at the Natureland seal sanctuary in Skegness, the drag queens of Funny Girls cabaret bar in Blackpool, and the donkey business run by John and his daughter Thalia in Skegness. In addition to Blackpool and Skegness the show also visited locations in Scarborough over its four series.

Including Bargain-Loving Brits in Blackpool as the first season, the first three series were each made up of six episodes, after which the episode order was increased, though Channel 5 have only broadcast three episodes of the last series before Bargain-Loving Brits by the Sea was dropped from the primetime schedule, with this last episode featuring an appearance from comedian Mick Miller.

== Bargain Brits in the Sun ==
This is a rebranded version of the 2013 programme Gibraltar: Britain in the Sun. It was repeated by Channel 5 in the 4pm weekday timeslot where the main series is usually scheduled with the title amended to give the striped programmes a coherent brand name from one series to the other, over the weeks of repeats.
