= Wilf Birkett =

English footballer (1922–1993)

Personal information
- Full name: Wilfred Birkett
- Date of birth: 26 June 1922
- Place of birth: Haydock, England
- Date of death: 24 December 1993 (aged 71)
- Place of death: Haydock, England
- Height: 5 ft 9 1/2 in (1.77 m)
- Position: Goalkeeper

Senior career*
Years	Team	Apps	(Gls)
- Haydock C & B
1944–1946	Everton	0	(0)
1946–1952	Southport	162	(0)
1952–1953	Shrewsbury Town	20	(0)
1953–1954	Southport	15	(0)
1958–196?	Wigan Athletic		
- * Club domestic league appearances and goals

Wilfred Birkett (26 June 1922 – 24 December 1993) was an English professional footballer who made nearly 200 appearances in the Football League playing as a goalkeeper for Southport and Shrewsbury Town.

== Life and career ==
Birkett was born in Haydock, Lancashire, in 1922. He joined Everton from Haydock Cricket and Bowling Club during the Second World War, but never played for their first team, and moved on to Southport in November 1946. He spent six years at Southport, then lost his place to Ray Minshull and signed for a season with Shrewsbury Town, when he was noted as a "Fine goalkeeper" despite being deaf. Returning to Southport in 1953, he regained his first-team place but was forced to retire on medical advice because his right shoulder was prone to dislocation. He remained at the club as assistant trainer for four years, and then spent 12 years as trainer at non-league club Wigan Athletic. He played for them occasionally, notably in the first round proper of the 1962–63 FA Cup against Gateshead; Wigan lost 2–1.

After retirement from playing football he was employed in the Parks Department of the municipal council at Ashton-under-Lyne. Birkett died at his Haydock home in 1993 at the age of 71.

Two brothers, Ronnie and Cliff, were also professional footballers.
