= Ronnie Birkett =

English footballer

Personal information
- Full name: Ronald Birkett
- Date of birth: 25 July 1927
- Place of birth: Warrington, England
- Date of death: December 1992 (aged 65)
- Place of death: Salford, England
- Position: Left winger

Senior career*
Years	Team	Apps	(Gls)
194?–1946	Cromptons Recreation		
1946–1947	Manchester City	0	(0)
1947–1948	New Brighton	8	(0)
1948–1949	Oldham Athletic	4	(0)
1949–1950	Accrington Stanley	14	(2)
1950–1951	Mossley		
- * Club domestic league appearances and goals

Ronald Birkett (25 July 1927 – December 1992) was an English professional footballer who played in the Football League as a left winger for New Brighton, Oldham Athletic and Accrington Stanley. He was on the books of Manchester City, without playing for their League side, and also played non-league football for Cromptons Recreation and Mossley, for which he made six appearances in all competitions.

Birkett was born in Warrington, Cheshire, in 1927 and died in Salford, Greater Manchester, in 1992 at the age of 65. Two brothers, Cliff and Wilf, were also professional footballers.
