= Keith Harris (ventriloquist) =

English ventriloquist (1947–2015)

- Keith Harris and Orville performing "Orville's Song" in 1982 on Top of the Pops
- Born: Keith Shenton Harris; 21 September 1947; Lyndhurst, Hampshire, England
- Died: 28 April 2015 (aged 67); Blackpool, Lancashire, England
- Occupations: Ventriloquist; puppeteer; voice actor
- Years active: 1965–2014

Keith Shenton Harris (21 September 1947 – 28 April 2015) was an English ventriloquist, best known for his television show The Keith Harris Show (1982–86), audio recordings, and club appearances with his puppets Orville the Duck and Cuddles the Monkey. He had a UK Top 10 hit single in 1982 with "Orville's Song" which reached number 4 in the charts.

The son of variety performers, Harris assisted in his father's ventriloquist acts as a child; as a teenager, he created his own ventriloquism characters which he performed at holiday resorts in the summer season, attracting the attention of television producers. He debuted on screen in 1965 and became a popular act guest starring on various shows; he had his first solo series Cuddles and Company in the 1970s, but got his big break in 1982 with The Keith Harris Show. He, Orville and Cuddles became popular performers on primetime television until The Quack Chat Show was cancelled in 1990, as audiences and television producers began to move away from variety performances.

After a low period and two failed business ventures in the early 1990s, he embarked on a busy stage career (mostly in pantomime) and found new appreciation in the 2000s, appearing as a guest in several television programmes. His output declined after a 2013 cancer diagnosis and he died two years later.

== Early life ==
Born in Lyndhurst, Hampshire, on 21 September 1947, Harris grew up in North Baddesley in Hampshire and near Chester, where he attended a secondary modern school. His parents were variety performers: his mother Lilian "Lila", née Simmons (1917–2018), was a dancer; his father, Norman Harris (1912–2005), was a singer, comedian and ventriloquist. From age nine Harris appeared on his father Norman's knee as a "dummy" in his ventriloquist act. Harris was severely dyslexic at school, and in 2014 he claimed his dyslexia had cost him millions of pounds because of his inability to read contracts accurately.

== Career ==
Harris began creating ventriloquism characters as a teenager. After appearing in summer seasons at holiday resorts, he had spots on the television series Let's Laugh (1965). Harris became a popular act on television variety shows, and following a spell as the host of The Black and White Minstrel Show, was given his own show called Cuddles and Company. He appeared several times on BBC TV's long-running show The Good Old Days.

Harris' best known creation, Orville the Duck, came about after he saw some green fur lying around backstage at a performance of The Black and White Minstrel Show in Bristol. Orville, recalled Simon Farquhar in his Independent obituary of Harris, was "a huge, gormless, falsetto-voiced green duckling sporting a nappy fastened by a giant safety pin". Harris recorded "Orville's Song", written by Bobby Crush. It made Number 4 in the UK singles chart in 1983 and sold 400,000 copies. It was later voted the worst song ever recorded.

The Keith Harris Show ran on Saturday evenings on BBC1 from 1982 to 1986 and a series for children The Quack Chat Show (1989–90) also on BBC1. Harris appeared in several Royal Variety Performances and also performed privately for the Royal Family. At the request of Diana, Princess of Wales he was booked as an act for the birthdays of Princes William and Harry at each of their respective third birthdays at Highgrove and Kensington Palace.

Alongside his continued pantomime performances, from the late 1990s Harris and Orville also enjoyed what The Stage described as a "long Indian summer" as they re-emerged on television in a new "era of knowing post-modern irony". Harris made guest appearances in a number of television shows during the 2000s including Harry Hill, Never Mind the Buzzcocks, Little Britain, Al Murray's Happy Hour, Banzai and The Weakest Link (2004). In 2002, he was the subject of a Louis Theroux documentary When Louis Met... Keith Harris. He and Orville won the Channel 5 reality TV show The Farm in 2005, the same year that he featured in Peter Kay and Tony Christie's music video to "(Is This the Way to) Amarillo".

== Later years ==
The end of Harris's television show coincided with a period when television was "turning away from variety acts". He entered a period of depression, drank heavily and was arrested for drink driving; his third marriage collapsed during this period. He also opened clubs in Blackpool and Portugal which failed, leading him to declare bankruptcy twice. However, he recovered and began performing in clubs, in pantomimes and at holiday camps, touring the United Kingdom; he wrote 17 of his own pantomimes and had his own pantomime company, Keith Harris Productions, which he sold in 2009.

He became an auctioneer on Bid TV and also appeared in an episode of the first season of the children's television programme The Slammer (2006). (Note: He turned down an offer to appear in the second series of Extras (2007), claiming that the writer, Ricky Gervais, wanted his character to be a "racist bigot"; Gervais said that Harris simply "didn't get it".) According to The Guardian, this renewed attention "established a new cult status for Harris and Orville and triggered a small comeback"; he appeared in Ashes to Ashes (2009) and Shameless (2011), in student unions (with his more adult show, Duck Off), and performed to the housemates in Celebrity Big Brother (2012).

== Personal life ==
Harris lived with his fourth wife (married in 1999), Sarah Metcalf, and his two youngest children (born in 2000), in Poulton-le-Fylde, where he converted the local cinema and bingo hall into a jazz nightclub called Club L'Orange.

=== Illness and death ===
In 2013, Harris had his spleen removed and underwent chemotherapy after a cancer diagnosis. He subsequently returned to work. The cancer returned in 2014. He died at Blackpool Victoria Hospital on 28 April 2015, aged 67.

== Legacy ==
In Harris's obituary in The Stage, Michael Quinn noted that "For more than a decade, ventriloquist Keith Harris was one of the biggest stars in light entertainment... Together, the saccharine-sweet avian [Orville], acerbic simian [Cuddles] and Harris as straight man and stooge were one of the most high-profile acts of the 1980s". Quinn also pointed out that this popularity faded after that decade, but that Harris nevertheless remained appreciated by audiences until his retirement. The Telegraph, however, remarked that the 2002 Louis Theroux documentary exposed a "darker side" of Harris, "a nervous, edgy man who kept telling rotten jokes" and who struggled to forgive past slights against him. In the same documentary Harris said of Orville that he had "created a monster ... Everybody knows Orville, not everybody knows Keith Harris", but also recognised that the bird had not "burdened" him and had contributed towards his success.

== Discography ==
=== Albums ===
- At the End of the Rainbow (1983) – UK No. 92

=== Singles ===
- "Orville's Song" (1982) – UK No. 4
- "Come to My Party" (1983) – UK No. 44
- "White Christmas" (1985) – UK No. 40
