= Eddie Colman =

English footballer (1936–1958)

- Colman in 1957

Personal information
- Full name: Edward Colman
- Date of birth: 1 November 1936
- Place of birth: Ordsall, Salford, England
- Date of death: 6 February 1958 (aged 21)
- Place of death: Munich, West Germany
- Position: Wing half

Youth career
- 1952–1955: Manchester United

Senior career*
| Years | Team | Apps | (Gls) |
| 1955–1958 | Manchester United | 85 | (1) |
- * Club domestic league appearances and goals

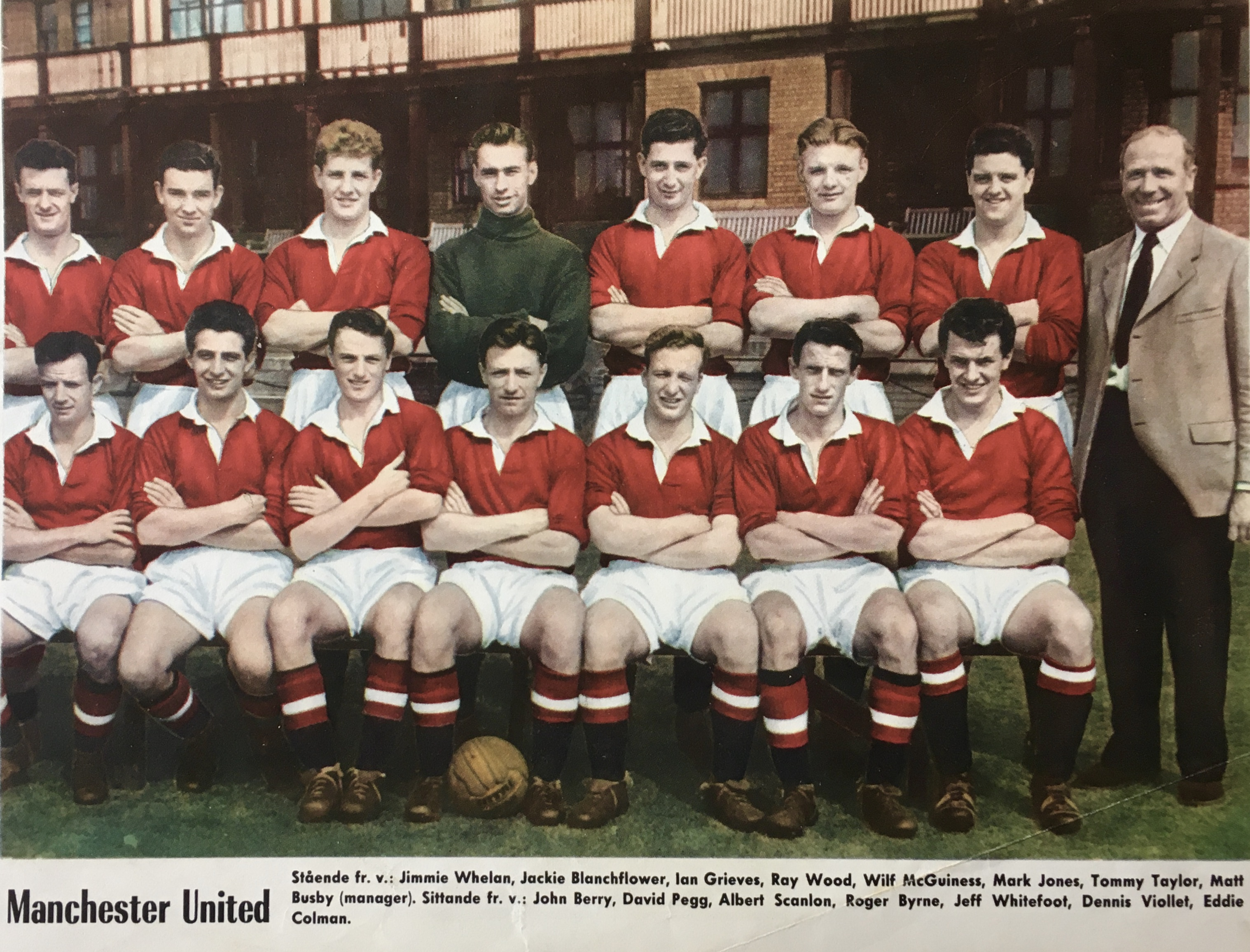
Manchester United F.C. in 1957 – from the left, standing: Liam Whelan, Jackie Blanchflower, Ian Greaves, Ray Wood, Wilf McGuinness, Mark Jones, Tommy Taylor, Matt Busby (manager); front row: Johnny Berry, David Pegg, Albert Scanlon, Roger Byrne, Jeff Whitefoot, Dennis Viollet and Eddie Colman.

Edward Colman (1 November 1936 – 6 February 1958), better known as Eddie Colman, was an English football player who played as a wing-half and one of the eight Manchester United players who lost their lives in the Munich air disaster.

== Biography ==
Colman joined Manchester United's youth team on leaving school in the summer of 1952. He became a first-team member at right-half during the 1955–56 season, ousting Jeff Whitefoot to play alongside Duncan Edwards. He finished the season with a Football League First Division title medal. He collected another league championship medal the following season, and also helped United reach the European Cup semi-finals. He played in the FA Cup final that season, but only collected a runners-up medal as United lost 2–1 to Aston Villa.

He made 108 first-team appearances for United, scoring two goals, the second of which came in the first leg of the fateful European Cup quarter-final tie against Red Star Belgrade. He died on 6 February 1958 in the crash at Munich airport after the plane stopped to refuel on the return flight.

In his time at United, he was nicknamed "Snakehips" for his trademark body swerve.

Aged 21 years and 3 months, he was the youngest of the 23 people to die. An accommodation building at the University of Salford is named after him – the Eddie Colman Court is a block of flats located near the main campus.

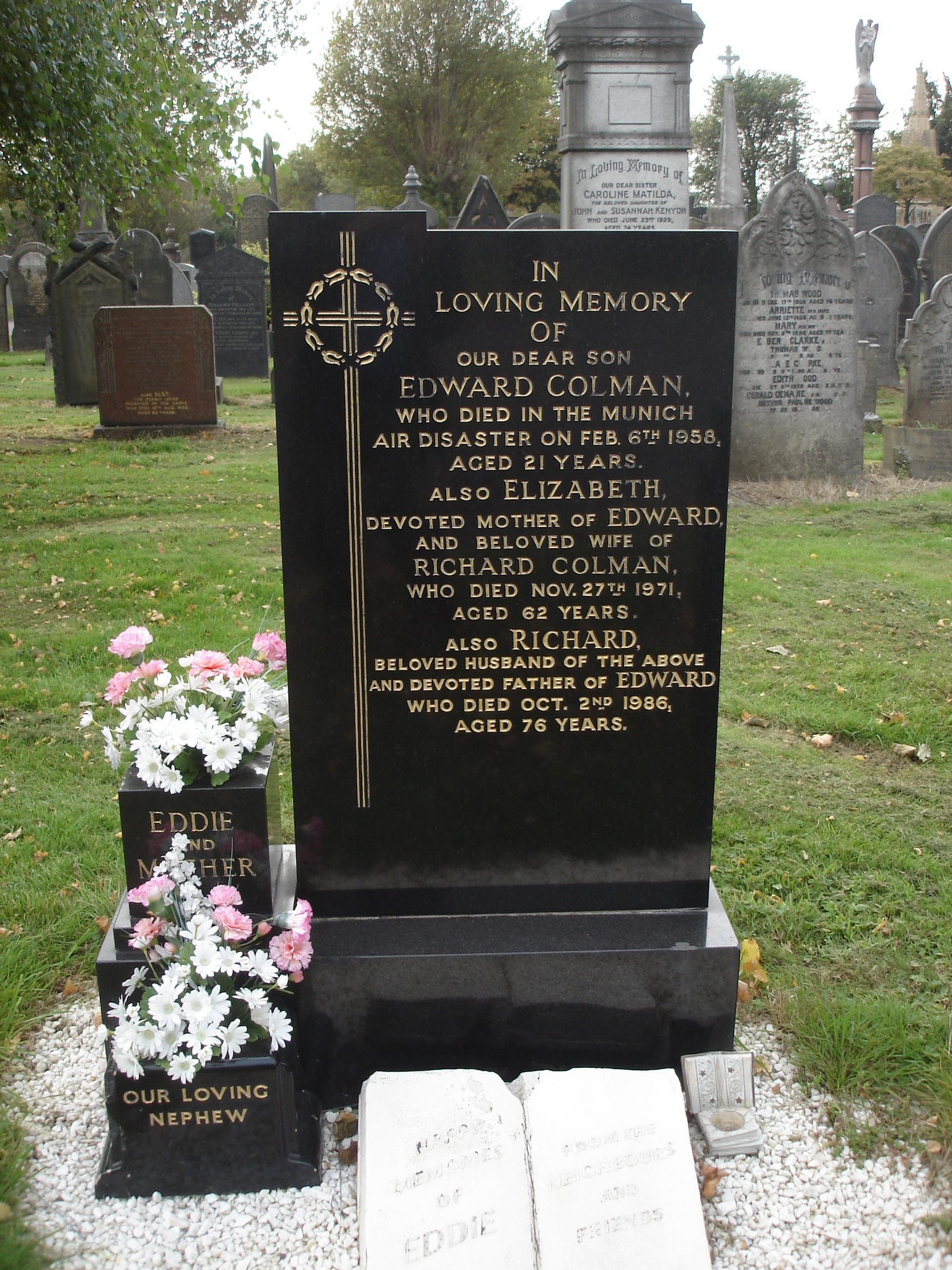
Eddie Colman's headstone, Weaste cemetery

A statue of Colman was erected at his graveside in Weaste Cemetery, Weaste, Salford, after his death, but it was badly damaged by vandals within a few years and after being repaired was placed in the home of his father Dick. Dick, who died in October 1986 at the age of 76, is buried alongside Eddie and Eddie's mother Elizabeth, who died in November 1971 at the age of 62.

Twenty-seven workers at a Manchester boxmaking firm were dismissed from their jobs for leaving work to attend Colman's funeral, but were all soon reinstated.

== Career statistics ==
Appearances and goals by club, season and competition
| Club | Season | League | | FA Cup | | European Cup | | Other | | Total | |
| Club | Season | Apps | Goals | Apps | Goals | Apps | Goals | Apps | Goals | Apps | Goals |
|---|---|---|---|---|---|---|---|---|---|---|---|
Manchester United
| Manchester United | 1955–56 | 25 | 0 | 1 | 0 | 0 | 0 | 0 | 0 | 26 | 0 |
| Manchester United | 1956–57 | 36 | 1 | 6 | 0 | 8 | 0 | 1 | 0 | 51 | 1 |
| Manchester United | 1957–58 | 24 | 0 | 2 | 0 | 5 | 1 | 0 | 0 | 31 | 1 |
| Total | | 85 | 1 | 9 | 0 | 13 | 1 | 1 | 0 | 108 | 2 |

== Honours ==
Manchester United

Football League Div 1: 1955-56, 1956-57

- FA Cup runner-up: 1956–57
