= Duncan Norvelle =

British comedian (1958–2024)

- Born: 2 April 1958; Hoton, Leicestershire, England
- Died: 12 December 2024 (aged 66); Boston, Lincolnshire, England

Duncan A. Norvelle (2 April 1958 – 12 December 2024) was an English comedian in the variety tradition, who appeared on British television from the early 1980s. He was often referred to as Duncan "Chase me" Norvelle, stemming from his catchphrase "Chase me!" His act was based on appearing to be a stereotypical camp homosexual despite being heterosexual and married three times.

== Early life and career ==
Norvelle was born in Hoton, near Loughborough, in Leicestershire. In the mid 1980s, he hosted an unscreened pilot dating show called It's a Hoot for London Weekend Television. The series was eventually re-titled Blind Date and hosted by Liverpudlian singer and entertainer Cilla Black. In 1991, Duncan appeared on the ITV comedy panel game show Through the Keyhole. He also appeared on Wogan, Surprise Surprise, The Bob Monkhouse Show, Bullseye, Blankety Blank and The Keith Harris Show.

2008 saw him go out on tour as part of the Ricky Tomlinson Laughter Show. Norvelle spent the 2009 pantomime season playing Buttons in Cinderella in Doncaster, South Yorkshire.

In 2011, he appeared on Celebrity Come Dine with Me with Sean Hughes, Gina Yashere and Paul Tonkinson.

In 2019, he appeared on an 80s special edition of Pointless Celebrities. His In the Club DVD was released on 16 January 2006 by Boulevard Entertainment, and he appeared on the Ricky Tomlinson Laughter Show Live DVD - the latter includes a brief interview. He also released an album, Music from My Life, in 2017. Norville was inducted into the Grand Order of Water Rats.

== Illness and death ==
Norvelle was hospitalised in 2012 after suffering a stroke, leaving him paralysed down the left side of his body. After nine weeks in hospital, he cancelled his summer season with comedy duo Cannon and Ball, and was replaced by Stu Francis.

In 2015, Norvelle chose the Embassy Theatre, Skegness, as his first performance after over three years off-stage, promising that funds from his show would be allocated to the Stroke Association. In the last few years of his life, he would also be filmed in Skegness at Neville Henshaw and Loraine Parker's 1960s themed Beeston Lodge Hotel for the Channel 5 series Bargain-Loving Brits by the Sea.

Norvelle died from a chest infection and sepsis at Pilgrim Hospital in Boston, Lincolnshire, on 12 December 2024, at the age of 66. His death was announced by his partner, Linda Trevallion. Among those to pay tribute to him was fellow comedian Jimmy Cricket, who described Norvelle as a "charismatic performer who thrilled audiences up and down the country with his style of humour and hilarious impressions."
