= Masashi Fujimoto =

Japanese actor, singer and composer

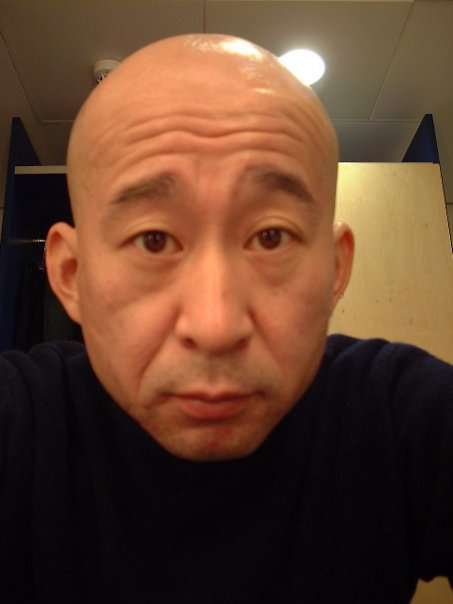
- Masashi Fujimoto in 2001
- Born: 1963 (age 62–63); Hiroshima, Japan
- Occupation: Entertainer
- Years active: 1995–present
- Website: www.masashi.co.uk

Masashi Fujimoto (藤本 政志, Fujimoto Masashi; born 1963) is a Japanese actor, singer, musician, and entertainer who lives in London, UK. He was born in Hiroshima in 1963, and graduated in music from Kunitachi College of Music in Tokyo in 1985. He joined Nikikai Opera in 1988. He moved to Italy in 1992, then to the UK in 1995.

Fujimoto's most high-profile role was as the MC, Mr Banzai, in the Channel 4 and Fox show Banzai. In 2007, he appeared in the BBC Two comedy series Roman's Empire as Mr Hokkasawa.

He is the voice of Mr Okatami in the game Party Game: Mr. Okatami's Winning Post released in November 2007 for the PlayStation 2.

He appeared in the music video for the song "Watch Out" by Alex Gaudino feat. Shena as a referee. In 2020 he appeared in the episode "Fish" (Series 1, Episode 4) of Diane Morgan's short comedy Mandy.
