= Roman's Empire =

British TV sitcom, BBC 2007

- Genre: Comedy
- Created by: Harry Williams; Jack Williams
- Starring: Mathew Horne; Neil Dudgeon; Montserrat Lombard; Sarah Solemani; Scarlett Rose Patterson; Carla Mendonça; Chris O'Dowd; Nicholas Burns; Morwenna Banks
- Narrated by: Mathew Horne
- Country of origin: United Kingdom
- Original language: English
- No. of series: 1
- No. of episodes: 6

Production
- Executive producer: Sophie Clarke-Jervoise
- Producer: Ben Cavey
- Running time: 30 minutes
- Production company: Tiger Aspect Productions

Original release
- Network: BBC Two
- Release: 12 April – 17 May 2007

Roman's Empire is a British television comedy programme starring Mathew Horne, Neil Dudgeon, Chris O'Dowd, Montserrat Lombard and Sarah Solemani. Written by brothers Harry and Jack Williams (sons of writer Nigel Williams) as their TV writing debut, the programme's first episode was aired on BBC Two on 12 April 2007 by the BBC.

== Plot ==
The show's central character is Leo (Mathew Horne), the ex-boyfriend of businessman Roman Pretty's (Neil Dudgeon) middle daughter Nikki (Montserrat Lombard), who still works and lives with the family. Nikki's new boyfriend, Seb (Nicholas Burns), has a shady past, which Leo tries to reveal to the Pretty family but usually ends up making himself look a fool. His best mate Jase (Chris O'Dowd) is married to the eldest sister, Jenny (Sarah Solemani), and is constantly attempting to get away from her and their new-born daughter.

After a complaint from Roman in a restaurant, Japanese chef Mr. Hokkasawa loses his job. He had sworn that he would never use his sword again but later takes the job of the Pretty family gardener, in a plot to kill Roman. However, he falls for Roman's youngest daughter Kelly. All the characters live in a large house owned by Roman, which is where the majority of the story is set.

== Cast ==
- Mathew Horne – Leo
- Neil Dudgeon – Roman
- Chris O'Dowd – Jase
- Nicholas Burns – Seb
- Sarah Solemani – Jenny
- Carla Mendonça – Morwenna
- Montserrat Lombard – Nikki
- Scarlett Rose Patterson – Kelly
- Robert Bathurst – Jesus
- Masashi Fujimoto – Mr. Hokkasawa
- Morwenna Banks – Baby Nikki (Voice)

== Running gags ==
The obvious Roman references can be seen throughout the series, most notably with the family "forum" and the lack of a male heir for the empire. There is also an incestuous undercurrent, though this seems to be due to the close-knit nature of the family. There is, however, one reference to Roman's whole-body massages.

The family is not averse to nudity, with Nikki declaring she will go to the Squid premiere naked in response to Leo's comment about clothing (Roman following suit), and Seb's infamous "Wang Shapes".

Although apparently a shrewd (and morally corrupt) businessman, Roman seems to lack certain common sense, and this is reflected on his insistence about the non-existence of geography, most notably Romania (the name for his theme park as inspired by Jase's scribbled escape plan) and later Rio de Janeiro (or Rio, as a combined Roman/Leo empire).

Mr. Hokkasawa was sacked from his job as a waiter in Yuki's Japanese restaurant at Roman's insistence (due to Nikki's unfounded accusations of Mr. Hokkasawa looking at her legs, which were under the tablecloth). From this point on, Mr. Hokkasawa plots his revenge taking up his samurai vows once again, and finding employment as the Pretty family gardener. His initial plot of luring Roman to his death in the potting shed (now redecorated as a Japanese house) fails, as it is Kelly who is drawn by the sprinklers. Mr. Hokkasawa is struck by her beauty, deciding it would be dishonourable to kill Roman and take his daughter as a wife. This becomes a running joke, as each time Mr. Hokkasawa is tempted to kill Roman he is also reminded of his love for Kelly.

As Mr. Hokkasawa speaks very little English, and as the rest of the cast do not speak Japanese, he often says things direct to the face of Roman, for example his plans to kill the latter. As Roman says, "a wonderful language."

Seb is a rugby-playing man's man who likes men but who is not homosexual. He does, however, enjoy a man-tangle, saying "It's what men do."

Jase hates the family, his wife Jenny and their baby. He tried to leave twice before the series but was foiled firstly by the death of Jenny's grandfather, and secondly by her announcement of her pregnancy. Throughout the series Jase plots a number of ways of getting out and moving to, for example, Thailand "where the women are cheaper than rice."

Seb always greets Leo with the phrase "Hey, mate!".

== Present status ==
Roman's Empire was not recommissioned by the BBC and was to remain as a one-off series. Sarah Solemani and Mathew Horne subsequently appeared in Jack Whitehall's Television series, Bad Education.

A pilot episode of an American remake of Roman's Empire has been commissioned by ABC, as a co-production between Tiger Aspect, Katalyst, and CBS Paramount. It was expected to star Nick Thune. However, as of October 2012, there has been no further production on the American version.
