= John Ball (footballer, born 1925) =

English footballer (1925–1998)

Personal information
- Date of birth: 13 March 1925
- Place of birth: Ince-in-Makerfield, Lancashire, England
- Date of death: 16 July 1998 (aged 73)
- Place of death: Australia
- Height: 1.78 m (5 ft 10 in)
- Position: Right back

Senior career*
Years	Team	Apps	(Gls)
?–1948	Wigan Athletic	18	(0)
- Gravesend (guest)
1948–1950	Manchester United	22	(0)
1950–1958	Bolton Wanderers	200	(2)
Total		240	(2)

Managerial career
- 1960–1963: Wigan Athletic
- * Club domestic league appearances and goals

John Ball (13 March 1925 – 16 July 1998) was an English footballer who played at right back for Manchester United and Bolton Wanderers in the late 1940s and 1950s.

Born in Ince-in-Makerfield, Lancashire, Ball began his football career with Wigan Athletic during the Second World War. During the war, since many players were in the armed forces, those who remained with their clubs would often make guest appearances for other clubs to make up the numbers. As well as playing for Wigan, Ball made guest appearances for Gravesend.

In February 1948, Ball was signed by Manchester United for a fee of £2,000. He made his debut two months later, a 2–0 defeat away to Everton on 10 April 1948. In just over two years with United, Ball was never a regular starter in the first team, serving as understudy to Johnny Carey at right back, and he made just 23 appearances in total for the club. In September 1950, he was sold to Bolton Wanderers as part of an exchange deal for Harry McShane.

Ball flourished at Bolton, playing in 200 league games for the Trotters. His Bolton career spanned eight seasons, from 1950 until his retirement from playing in 1958. He played in the 'Matthews Final' in 1953. In 1960, Ball was appointed as manager of his first club, Wigan Athletic. He remained in the position for three years, before retiring from football altogether and set up a painting and decorating business. Later he emigrated to live in Australia, where he died in July 1998 at the age of 73.

Ball's popularity led to the television presenter and mathematician Johnny Ball taking and using the nickname Johnny, instead of his birth name Graham.

== Honours ==
Bolton Wanderers

- FA Cup runner-up: 1952–53
