= Cliff Birkett =

English footballer

Personal information
- Full name: Clifford Birkett
- Date of birth: 17 September 1933
- Place of birth: Haydock, Lancashire, England
- Date of death: 11 January 1997 (aged 63)
- Place of death: Haydock, England
- Height: 5 ft 7 in (1.70 m)
- Position: Forward

Youth career
- 1949–1950: Manchester United

Senior career*
Years	Team	Apps	(Gls)
1950–1956	Manchester United	9	(2)
1956–1957	Southport	14	(4)
1957–195?	Cromptons Recreation		
1959	Wigan Rovers		
1959–1960	Macclesfield Town	19	(7)
- * Club domestic league appearances and goals

Clifford Birkett (17 September 1933 – 11 January 1997) was an English footballer who played in the Football League as a forward for Manchester United and Southport. He was a schoolboy international. He also played non-league football for Cromptons Recreation, Wigan Rovers and Macclesfield Town.

Birkett was born in Haydock, Lancashire, in 1933 and died there in 1997 at the age of 63. Two brothers, Ronnie and Wilf, were also professional footballers.
