= Walter Whitehurst =

English footballer

Personal information
- Full name: Walter Whitehurst
- Date of birth: 7 June 1934
- Place of birth: Manchester, England
- Date of death: 20 January 2012 (aged 77)
- Place of death: Blackpool, England
- Position: Wing half

Senior career*
Years	Team	Apps	(Gls)
1955–1956	Manchester United	1	(0)
1956–1960	Chesterfield	91	(2)
1960–1961	Crewe Alexandra	3	(1)
1961–1962	Macclesfield Town	3	(0)
1962–1964	Mossley	107	(3)
	Ashton United	?	(?)
Total		205	(6)
- * Club domestic league appearances and goals

Walter Whitehurst (7 June 1934 – 20 January 2012) was an English footballer. His regular position was at wing half. He was born in Manchester. He played for Manchester United and Chesterfield.

He died in Blackpool Victoria Hospital, aged 77, after being ill for some time.
