= Thomas Howes (actor) =

English actor (born 1986)

- Born: 16 July 1986 (age 39); Woodlands, South Yorkshire, England
- Education: Guildhall School of Music and Drama
- Occupation: Actor
- Known for: William Mason in Downton Abbey

Thomas Howes (born 16 July 1986) is an English actor. He trained at the Guildhall School of Music and Drama.

== Career ==
He is best known for having played the role of William Mason, the second footman in ITV's Downton Abbey, and played the role of Manchester United player Mark Jones in the 2011 TV film of the Munich air disaster, United. He also has performed on the stage in the roles of Dickie in The Winslow Boy (The Theatre Royal, Bath) and Scripps in The History Boys (The UK tour of the National Theatre), and on radio in the role of Joseph Prado in Tulips in Winter.

== Filmography ==
=== Film ===
Year	Title	Role	Notes
2011	United	Mark Jones	
2012	Anna Karenina	Yashvin	
2025	The Choral	Gilbert Pollard	

=== Television ===
Year	Title	Role	Notes
2008	ChuckleVision	Young Raef	Episode: 'The Mystery of Little-Under-Standing'
2010–2011	Downton Abbey	William Mason	12 episodes
2011	Downton Abbey: Behind the Drama	William Mason / Himself	Television documentary
2012	Downton Abbey Revisited	William Mason / Himself	Television documentary
2013	Murdoch Mysteries	Winston Churchill	Episode: 'Winston's Lost Night'
2016	Houdini & Doyle	Constable Booth	Episode: 'The Monsters of Nethermoor'
2016	Dark Angel	George Ward	
2016	Walk Invisible: The Brontë Sisters	Samuel Hartley	Television film
2019	Gentleman Jack	John Booth	6 episodes
2020	Call the Midwife	Eddie Tannerman	Series 9, episode 8
