= The Keith Harris Show =

- Starring: Keith Harris
- Country of origin: United Kingdom
- No. of series: 3
- No. of episodes: 20

Production
- Running time: 30 minutes

Original release
- Network: BBC
- Release: 31 December 1982 – 14 June 1986

The Keith Harris Show was a comedy variety show on BBC TV featuring Keith Harris and Orville the Duck.

== Series overview ==
- New Year Special: 31 December 1982
- Series 1: 14 May - 18 June 1983 6 epsoides:
- Bank Holiday Special 28 May 1984
- Series 2: 11 May - 8 June 1985 6 epsoides:
- Series 3: 10 May - 14 June 1986 6 epsoides:
