= Jeff Whitefoot (footballer) =

English footballer (1933–2024)

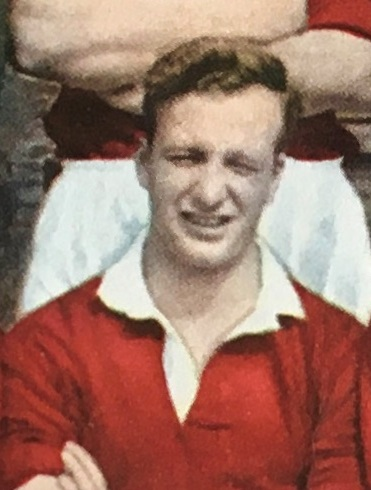
- Whitefoot in 1957

Personal information
- Date of birth: 31 December 1933
- Place of birth: Cheadle, Cheshire, England
- Date of death: 2 July 2024 (aged 90)
- Position: Wing half

Youth career
- 1949–1950: Manchester United

Senior career*
| Years | Team | Apps | (Gls) |
| 1950–1957 | Manchester United | 93 | (0) |
| 1957–1958 | Grimsby Town | 26 | (5) |
| 1958–1967 | Nottingham Forest | 255 | (5) |
| Total | | 374 | (10) |

International career
| 1954 | England U23 | 1 | (0) |
- * Club domestic league appearances and goals

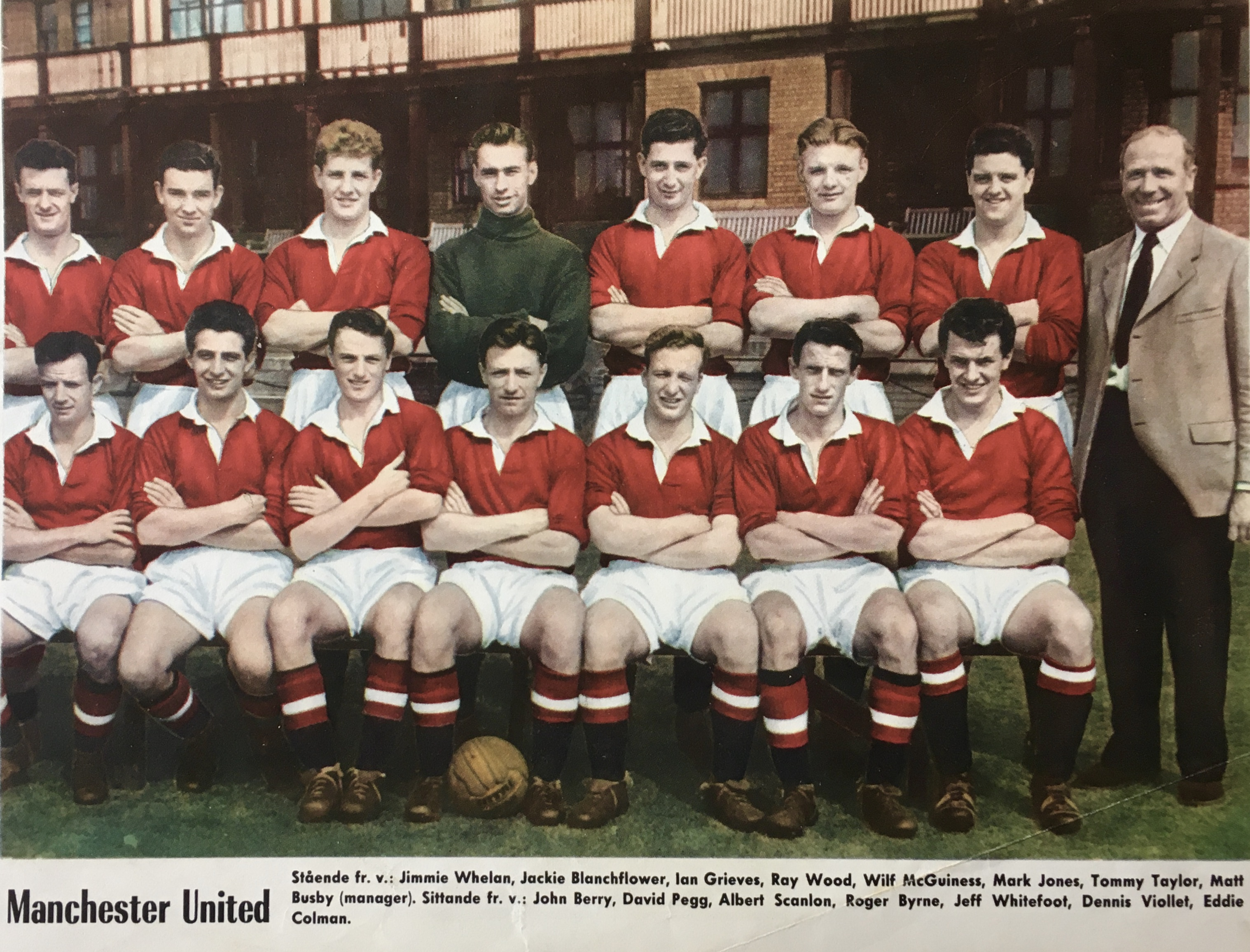
Manchester United F.C. in 1957 with this players – from the left, standing: Liam Whelan, Jackie Blanchflower, Ian Greaves, Ray Wood, Wilf McGuinness, Mark Jones, Tommy Taylor, Matt Busby (manager); from the left, sitting: Johnny Berry, David Pegg, Albert Scanlon, Roger Byrne, Jeff Whitefoot, Dennis Viollet and Eddie Colman.

Jeffrey Whitefoot (31 December 1933 – 2 July 2024) was an English footballer who played as a wing half in the Football League for Manchester United, Grimsby Town and Nottingham Forest. He was capped by England at under-23 level in 1954.

Whitefoot started his career as a trainee with Manchester United in 1949. When he made his debut against Portsmouth in April 1950 he was at the time the youngest player to start in a League match for United at 16 years and 105 days. In eight seasons at United, he made 95 appearances in all competitions and was a member of the 1952 and 1956 title-winning sides, although he never scored a goal for them. He left the club for Grimsby Town in 1957, but returned to the First Division to sign for Nottingham Forest a year later, and helped them win the FA Cup in 1959. He stayed at the City Ground until his retirement as a player at the end of the 1966–67 season, when Forest finished second behind Manchester United in the league—at the time Forest's best league finish.

After Billy Gray's death on 11 April 2011, Whitefoot became the only surviving member of the 1959 FA Cup winning team. The death of Bill Foulkes on 25 November 2013 also meant that Whitefoot then became the last player still living to have collected a league title winner's medal with Manchester United in the 1955–56 season, having played 15 times in the league that season. However, seven of the United players who qualified for a championship medal that season lost their lives as a result of the Munich air disaster on 6 February 1958, including Eddie Colman, the player who ousted Whitefoot as the club's regular right-half during that season.

After leaving football, Whitefoot ran pubs in East Leake and Oakham. He has been called "the last of the Busby Babes". Whitefoot died on 2 July 2024, at the age of 90.

== Honours ==
Manchester United

- Football League First Division: 1955–56

Nottingham Forest

- FA Cup: 1958–59
