= Mark Jones (footballer, born 1933) =

English footballer

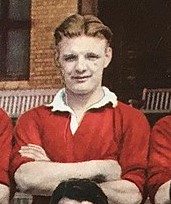
- Jones in 1957

Personal information
- Date of birth: 15 June 1933
- Place of birth: Wombwell, West Riding of Yorkshire, England
- Date of death: 6 February 1958 (aged 24)
- Place of death: Munich, Bavaria, Germany
- Position: Centre-half

Youth career
- Manchester United

Senior career*
Years	Team	Apps	(Gls)
1950–1958	Manchester United	103	(1)
- * Club domestic league appearances and goals

Mark Jones (15 June 1933 – 6 February 1958) was an English footballer who played as an centre-half and one of eight Manchester United players who lost their lives in the Munich air disaster. Jones was born in Wombwell, near Barnsley, West Riding of Yorkshire in 1933, the third of seven children born to miner Amos Jones (1894–1968) and his wife Lucy (1896–1957). He was the club's first-choice centre-half for much of the 1950s and collected two League Championship winner's medals.

== Career ==
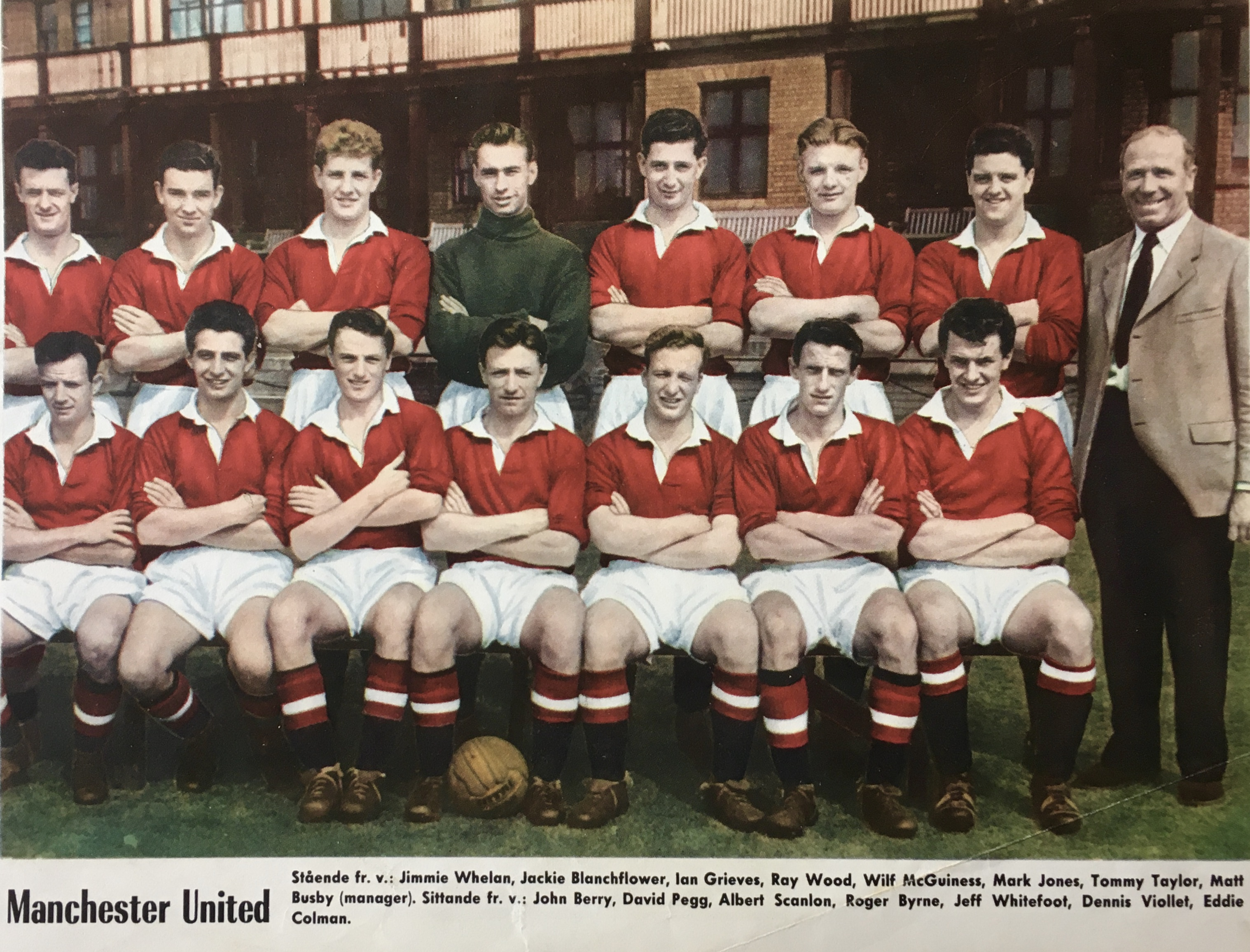
Jones (back row, third from right) in a Manchester United team photo in 1957

Jones signed for Manchester United as an apprentice on leaving school in 1948, and also worked an apprentice bricklayer for a while afterwards. He made his first two senior appearances for United in the 1950–51 season, aged 17, and by the time of United's title glory in 1955–56 he was a regular first team player, although he often found himself out of the team in favour of Jackie Blanchflower (who was originally a wing-half or an inside-forward), having previously been understudy to the veteran Allenby Chilton. By the time United won the league title in 1956, he was a regular member of the first team, and collected another league title medal the following year.

He missed the 1957 FA Cup Final defeat to Aston Villa because of an eye injury, although he did collect a second successive league title medal that season and helped United reach the semi-finals of the European Cup. He played a total of 120 first team games for United (103 of them in the league), and scored once. He was selected in an England senior squad once, but did not take to the field. Many observers believe that he would have been capped by England had he not died at Munich. He came close to international action, having been selected on the substitutes' bench, but his hopes of a breakthrough were not helped by the fact that his career coincided with that of Billy Wright. He was seen by many observers as a likely successor to Wright in the centre of the England defence.

== Legacy ==
Jones is buried in Wombwell near Barnsley, his birthplace. He had moved from there in the early 1950s after turning professional with Manchester United and moving to Flixton. For the last two years of his life he lived in Firswood, Stretford.

Jones was often nicknamed Dan Archer by his teammates, in reference to his pipe-smoking habit similar to that of the character in the radio serial The Archers.

He was portrayed in a 2011 BBC film, United, by actor Thomas Howes. The producers mistakenly cast him as the team captain, when in fact Roger Byrne was captain of the United side at the time.

== Career statistics ==
Appearances and goals by club, season and competition
Club	Season	League		FA Cup		European Cup		Other		Total	
Club	Season	Apps	Goals	Apps	Goals	Apps	Goals	Apps	Goals	Apps	Goals
Manchester United
Manchester United	1950–51	4	0	0	0	0	0	0	0	4	0
Manchester United	1951–52	3	0	0	0	0	0	0	0	3	0
Manchester United	1952–53	2	0	0	0	0	0	0	0	2	0
Manchester United	1953–54	0	0	0	0	0	0	0	0	0	0
Manchester United	1954–55	13	0	0	0	0	0	0	0	13	0
Manchester United	1955–56	42	1	1	0	0	0	0	0	43	1
Manchester United	1956–57	29	0	4	0	6	0	1	0	40	0
Manchester United	1957–58	10	0	2	0	4	0	0	0	16	0
Total		103	1	7	0	10	0	1	0	121	1
