= Frank Taylor =

Frank Taylor may refer to:

== Politics and law ==
- Frank Trafford Taylor (1891–1943), Canadian lawyer
- Frank Taylor (British politician) (1907–2003), English MP for Manchester Moss Side
- Frank Taylor (Irish politician) (1914–1998), Irish Fine Gael Party politician and TD
- Frank J. Taylor (1884–1958) American politician from New York

== Sports ==
=== Association football (soccer) ===
- Frank Taylor (footballer, born 1887) (1887–1928), English footballer who played for Lincoln City
- Frank Taylor (footballer, born 1901) (1901–1973), English footballer who played for Bournemouth and Gillingham
- Frank Taylor (Scottish footballer) (born 1909), Scottish footballer
- Frank Taylor (footballer, born 1916) (1916–1970), English footballer who played for Wolverhampton Wanderers

=== Cricket ===
- Frank Taylor (English cricketer) (1855–1936), English cricketer
- Frank Taylor (Wellington cricketer) (1859–1937), New Zealand cricketer
- Frank Taylor (Auckland cricketer) (1890–1960), New Zealand cricketer

=== Other sports ===
- Frank M. Taylor (1869–1941), American horse trainer, trained the winner of the Kentucky Derby in 1912
- Frank Taylor (American football) (fl. 1890s), American college football coach
- Bud Taylor (golfer) (Frank Monroe Taylor Jr., 1916–1991), American amateur golfer
- Frank Taylor (journalist) (1920–2002), English sports journalist
- Frank Taylor (boxer), Welsh boxer in the 1930s

== Others ==
- Frank Bursley Taylor (1860–1938), American geologist
- Frank E. Taylor, (1916-1999) American book publisher and film producer
- Frank Harold Taylor (1896–1985), World War I flying ace
- Frank Hamilton Taylor (1846–1927), American artist, illustrator, and author
- F. Sherwood Taylor (1897–1956), English historian of science and curator
- Frank Taylor (actor) (1920–2004), Scottish-born Australian actor

== See also ==
- Francis Taylor (disambiguation)
