= Denis Follows =

British sports administrator

Sir Denis Follows CBE
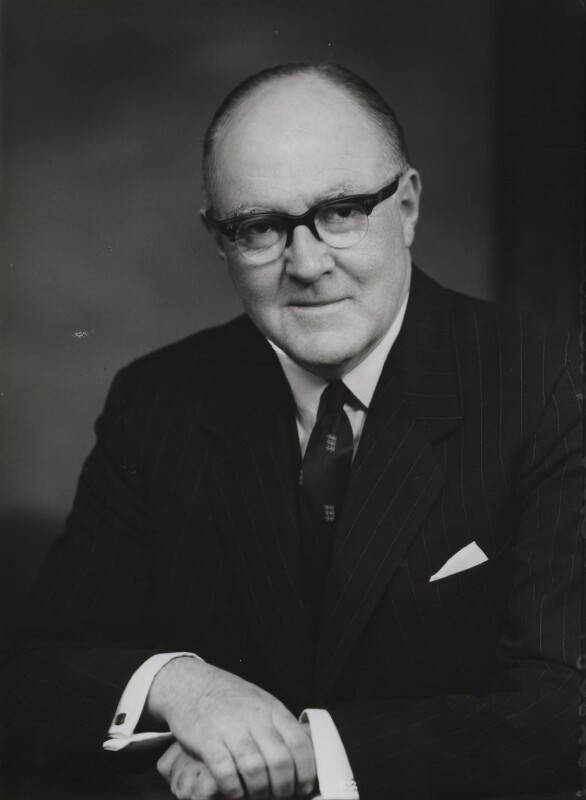
- Sir Denis Follows in 1962

Chairman of the British Olympic Association
- In office 1977–1983
- President: Lord Rupert Nevill; Anne, Princess Royal
- Preceded by: Lord Rupert Nevill
- Succeeded by: Charles Palmer

Secretary of the Football Association
- In office 1962–1973
- President: Prince Henry, Duke of Gloucester; George Lascelles, 7th Earl of Harewood; Prince Edward, Duke of Kent
- Chair: Graham Doggart; Joe Mears; Andrew Stephen
- Preceded by: Stanley Rous
- Succeeded by: Ted Croker

President of the National Union of Students
- In office 1931–1933
- Preceded by: H Trevor Lloyd
- Succeeded by: Charles G Gilmore

Personal details
- Born: 13 April 1908 Nottinghamshire
- Died: 17 September 1983 (aged 75) Chiswick, London
- Education: University of London; University of Nottingham
- Known for: 1966 FIFA World Cup; Great Britain at the 1980 Summer Olympics

Military service
- Allegiance: United Kingdom
- Branch/service: Royal Air Force
- Conflict: World War II

Sir Denis Follows, CBE (13 April 1908 – 17 September 1983) was a British sports administrator. Between 1962 and 1973 he was Secretary of the Football Association (FA) and was Chairman of the British Olympic Association from 1977 to 1983 .

== Early life and education ==
Born in Nottinghamshire, Follows moved to Lincolnshire with his family in 1919, after his father got a job as the station master at Lincoln St Marks railway station.

Follows was educated at the universities of London and Nottingham, studying English at the latter. He was Secretary and President of University of Nottingham Students' Union in 1929-30 and 1930–31, respectively. Follows became Vice-President of the National Union of Students in 1930-31, followed by two terms as the union's president between 1931 and 1933.

== Career ==
=== Aviation ===
Due his visual impairment, Follows was excluded from the National Service during World War II. Despite this, he joined the Royal Air Force as a teacher. After the war, Follows joined the British Airline Pilots' Association (BALPA), where he was general secretary from 1947 to 1966. In this role, Follows advocated for the introduction of a national maximum hours of duty for pilots that would allow for adequate rest time and thus ensure passengers' safety. Follows also acted as Captain James Thain's union representative when the pilot was blamed for causing the Munich air disaster. Thain's name was cleared in 1968.

As secretary for BALPA, Follows was also credited for his contribution to the foundation of the International Federation of Air Line Pilots' Associations, where he also served as secretary for several years.

=== Sports administrator ===
In 1962, Follows was appointed secretary of the Football Association, having previously been the association's honorary treasurer and Council member for 14 years. During his tenure at the FA, Follows oversaw the organisation of the 1966 FIFA World Cup, where England won its first champion title. Follows was also credited with the introduction of "World Cup Willie" as the mascot for the tournament, which was also the first ever World Cup official mascot.

In January 1970, while serving as the FA secretary, Follows wrote to the Women's Football Association to inform them that the 1921 ban on women's football had been rescinded. He continued to support women's football after his tenure at the FA. He presented the trophy at the 1982 WFA Cup final.

Follows was chairman of the British Olympic Association from 1977 to 1983. In this role, he was instrumental in ensuring that British competitors were able to choose whether or not to compete at the 1980 Moscow Olympics. The BOA had come under government pressure to withdraw the team in protest at the Soviet invasion of Afghanistan. Follows' argument against the boycott of the Olympics was that “Sport help[ed] to bridge the gulf between nations, it is the most unifying thing in the world today”. Due to the government's opposition and funding cuts, Follows had to travel across the country to fundraise for Britain's delegation to the Olympics. He later led the party to Moscow as Team Commandant.

== Honours and recognitions ==
Having been appointed Member of the Order of the British Empire (MBE) in the 1950 Birthday Honours for his work as Secretary of the British Airline Pilots Association, Follows was promoted to Commander of the Order of the British Empire (CBE) in the 1967 New Year Honours, and knighted in the 1978 Birthday Honours for services to sport.

In recognition of Follows' role in reversing the ban on women's football, the Women's Football Association made him an honorary life vice president in 1973.

Follows was awarded the JL Manning Award for services to sport off the field of play by the Sports Journalists' Association at the association's annual Sports Awards in 1980.

In 2020, University of Nottingham announced that it would induct Follows to its Sporting Hall of Fame.

== Personal life ==
Follows was married to Betty Follows, who supported him in his duty as secretary of the FA, notably presenting the trophy at the first ever WFA Cup final to the winning team, Southampton Women's F.C., in 1971.

Follows' daughter, Margaret Ferris, also studied at the University of Nottingham. She was invited back to the university in 2022 for a ceremony to celebrate her father's posthumous induction to the institution's Sporting Hall of Fame.

Follows passed away on 17 September 1983 at his home in Chiswick, London, aged 75.

== Bibliography ==
- Lopez, Sue (1997). Women on the Ball: A Guide to Women's Football. London, England: Scarlet Press. ISBN 1857270169.
