= Frank Taylor (footballer, born 1901) =

English footballer

Personal information
- Full name: Frank Edward Taylor
- Date of birth: 16 July 1901
- Place of birth: Wolverhampton, England
- Date of death: 1973 (aged 71–72)
- Height: 5 ft 8 in (1.73 m)
- Position: Inside forward

Senior career*
Years	Team	Apps	(Gls)
1920–1921	Sunbeam Motors		
1921–1922	Port Vale	0	(0)
1922–1923	Sunbeam Motors		
1923–1936	Newport County	34	(12)
1926–1928	Bournemouth & Boscombe Athletic	61	(21)
1928–1929	Gillingham	29	(8)
1929–19??	Shrewsbury Town		
Total		124	(41)
- * Club domestic league appearances and goals

Francis Edward Taylor (16 July 1901 – 1973) was an English professional footballer of the 1920s.

== Career ==
Born in Wolverhampton, he played at inside forward. He played non-League football for Sunbeam Motors and was briefly on the books at Port Vale. He joined Newport County for three years in 1923. He joined Gillingham from Bournemouth & Boscombe Athletic in 1928. He made 29 appearances for the club in the Football League, scoring eight goals. He later played for Shrewsbury Town in the Birmingham & District League.

== Career statistics ==
Appearances and goals by club, season and competition
Club	Season	League			FA Cup		Total	
Club	Season	Division	Apps	Goals	Apps	Goals	Apps	Goals
Port Vale	1921–22	Second Division	0	0	0	0	0	0
Newport County	1923–24	Third Division South	2	0	0	0	2	0
Newport County	1924–25	Third Division South	19	11	0	0	19	11
Newport County	1925–26	Third Division South	13	1	2	1	15	2
Newport County	Total		34	12	2	1	36	13
Bournemouth & Boscombe Athletic	1926–27	Third Division South	27	11	5	3	32	14
Bournemouth & Boscombe Athletic	1927–28	Third Division South	34	10	4	2	38	12
Bournemouth & Boscombe Athletic	Total		61	21	9	5	70	26
Gillingham	1928–29	Third Division South	29	8	2	0	31	8
Career total			124	41	13	6	137	47
