= No. 153 Squadron RAF =

Defunct flying squadron of the Royal Air Force

- Active: 4 November 1918 - 13 June 1919; 24 October 1941 - 5 September 1944; 7 October 1944 - 28 September 1945; 28 February 1955 – 2 July 1958
- Country: United Kingdom
- Branch: Royal Air Force
- Role: Fighter; Ground Attack; Bomber; Night Fighter
- Size: Squadron
- Motto: Noctividus Latin: Seeing by night

Insignia
- 1950s squadron roundel

No. 153 Squadron was a Royal Air Force squadron that saw service in both the First and Second World Wars.

== History ==
On 1 July 1958, the unit was renumbered as No. 25 Squadron RAF.

== Aircraft operated ==
Dates	Aircraft	Variant	Notes	References
1918–1919	Sopwith Camel		Single-engined biplane fighter	
1941–1942	Boulton Paul Defiant	I	Single-engined fighter	
1942–1943	Bristol Beaufighter	IF	Twin-engined ground attack	
1942–1944	Bristol Beaufighter	VIF		
1944	Hawker Hurricane	IIC	Single-engined fighter	
1944	Supermarine Spitfire	VIII; IX	Single-engined fighter	
1944–1945	Avro Lancaster	I and III	Four-engined heavy bomber	
1955–1957	Gloster Meteor	NF12 and NF14	Twin-engined jet night fighter	

== Bases used ==
- RAF Ballyhalbert - October 1941 - January 1943
- RAF Limavady - October 1941 to January 1942 - Detachment
- RAF Maison Blanche - Algiers Algeria - December 1942 - July 1943
- RAF Rerhaia - Reghaia Algeria - July 1943 - September 1944
- RAF Alghero - Sardinia - July - September 1944 - Detachment
- RAF Kirmington - October 1944 - UK
- RAF Scampton - October 15,1944 to September, 1945

== Notable personnel ==
- Kenneth Rayment, served with 153 Squadron from 1941 to 1943; he was the co-pilot during the Munich air disaster of 1958
- Francis Richard Lee Mellersh, commanded No. 153 Squadron from 1956–1957
