= Tom Curry (footballer) =

English footballer

Personal information
- Date of birth: 1 September 1894
- Place of birth: South Shields, England
- Date of death: 6 February 1958 (aged 63)
- Place of death: Munich, West Germany
- Height: 5 ft 8 1/2 in (1.74 m)
- Position: Half back

Senior career*
Years	Team	Apps	(Gls)
1919–1929	Newcastle United	221	(5)
1929–1930	Stockport County	19	(1)

Managerial career
- 1930–1934: Carlisle United (trainer)
- 1934–1958: Manchester United (trainer)
- * Club domestic league appearances and goals

Tom Curry (1 September 1894 – 6 February 1958) was an English footballer who played as a half back for Newcastle United and Stockport County in the 1920s. After retiring from playing, he became the club trainer at Carlisle United; he remained in that job for four years, before becoming the trainer for Manchester United, a position he held until his death in the Munich air disaster.

== Career ==
Born in South Shields, County Durham, Curry began his football career with his local side, Newcastle United. The start of his professional career was delayed by the First World War in which he served as a sergeant with the Tyne Electrical Engineers. He played as a half-back, making 221 appearances between 1919 and 1929, and scoring five goals. In 1929, he moved to Stockport County, for whom he played for one season; he scored once in 19 league appearances for Stockport.

In 1930, Curry retired from playing football and began to focus on coaching; he was soon appointed as the trainer of Carlisle United. After four years with Carlisle, Curry was picked up by Manchester United, who were then managed by Scott Duncan. Football was suspended in 1939 due to the Second World War. When it resumed after the war, Duncan was replaced by Matt Busby.

In 1958, Curry travelled to Yugoslavia with the Manchester United team for a European Cup quarter-final second leg against Red Star Belgrade. On the way back, the plane carrying the team stopped in Munich for refuelling. However, due to slush on the runway, the plane was unsuccessful in its third take-off attempt and crashed. The incident, later to become known as the Munich air disaster, killed 23 of the 44 people on board, including Curry.

Curry was cremated at Manchester Crematorium.
