= Les Olive =

English football executive

Personal information
- Full name: Robert Leslie Olive
- Date of birth: 27 April 1928
- Place of birth: Salford, England
- Date of death: 20 May 2006 (aged 78)
- Place of death: Salford, England
- Position: Goalkeeper

Youth career
- 1942–1953: Manchester United

Senior career*
Years	Team	Apps	(Gls)
1953	Manchester United	2	(0)
- * Club domestic league appearances and goals

Robert Leslie Olive (27 April 1928 – 20 May 2006) was a football player and administrator who was club secretary of Manchester United from 1958 to 1988, when he was made a director of the club.

Born in Salford, England, he joined the Manchester United ground staff at the age of 14 in 1942. He then performed his National Service with the Royal Air Force before returning to Manchester United in 1948 to begin his administrative career overseeing the club's reserve team. He retained ambitions as a player and was a regular in the club's 'A' and 'B' junior sides, as well as making the odd reserve team appearance. He played in "every position except outside left", but preferred a defensive role as either a full-back or a centre-half; however, it was as a goalkeeper that he made his first-team debut, just three weeks before his 25th birthday. With first-team goalkeepers Jack Crompton, Ray Wood and Reg Allen all unavailable due to injury and illness, Olive was picked to play in goal away to Newcastle United on 11 April 1953, helping Manchester United to a 2–1 win. He made one more appearance in senior football, a 2–2 draw at home to West Bromwich Albion the following week, before returning to the 'A' team as a left-back.

That year, he was made assistant club secretary under Walter Crickmer. In 1958, Crickmer was killed in the Munich air disaster along with eight Manchester United players, two other members of the club's staff and various others as the team returned from a European Cup match against Red Star Belgrade. Along with his wife Betty, Olive was responsible for breaking the news to the victims' families and helping to organise funerals. He was officially made club secretary in the summer of 1958 and remained in the role until his retirement in 1988, when he joined the club's board of directors.

Olive also represented Manchester United at the Manchester Football Association from 1959, and was president at the time of his death from prostate cancer at the age of 78 on 20 May 2006. He was survived by his wife and daughter, Susan.
