= Francis Taylor =

Francis Taylor may refer to:

- Francis Taylor, Baron Taylor of Hadfield (1905–1995), founder of the housebuilder Taylor Woodrow
- Francis Taylor (cricketer) (1890–1963), Derbyshire cricketer
- Francis Taylor (martyr) (died 1621), former Lord Mayor of Dublin, martyred 1621
- Francis Taylor (Liberal Unionist politician) (1845–1915), English Liberal Unionist MP for South Norfolk, 1885–1898
- Francis Henry Taylor (1903–1957), American museum director and curator
- Francis Lenn Taylor (1897–1968), American art dealer, father of actress Elizabeth Taylor
- Francis Pringle Taylor (1847–1913), UK naval officer, active in colonial Australia
- Francis X. Taylor, former ambassador-at-large for the U.S. Department of State; appointed by George W. Bush to the Privacy and Civil Liberties Oversight Board
- Francis Taylor, 1st Baron Maenan (1854–1951), English barrister and judge
- Frankie Taylor (born 1942), British Olympic boxer

== See also ==
- Frank Taylor (disambiguation)
