= 1924–25 Newport County A.F.C. season =

Welsh association football club season

Newport County
1924–25 season
- Manager: Jimmy Hindmarsh
- Stadium: Somerton Park
- Third Division South: 6th
- FA Cup: 5th qualifying round
- Welsh Cup: 6th round
- Top goalscorer: League: W.G.Charlton (14); All: W.G.Charlton (14)
- Highest home attendance: 15,000 vs Swansea Town (10 April 1925)
- Lowest home attendance: 5,000 vs Brentford (4 April 1925)
- Average home league attendance: 8,561
Home colours	Away colours

The 1924–25 season was Newport County's fifth season in the Football League, fourth consecutive season in the Third Division South and fifth season overall in the third tier. The club eventually finished sixth, but in the second half of the season County were in contention for the one available promotion place to the Second Division. The matches with local rivals Swansea Town on 10 and 13 April were crucial to either side's chances of promotion. Going into the home game on 10 April, Newport were in fifth place and Swansea were top. A season's best attendance saw County knock Town from top spot with a 3–0 win, but they regained it with a win in the return fixture three days later. Swansea went on to win the title by one point.

== Season review ==
=== Results summary ===
Overall								Home						Away					
Pld	W	D	L	GF	GA	GAv	Pts	W	D	L	GF	GA	Pts	W	D	L	GF	GA	Pts
42	20	9	13	62	42	1.476	49	13	6	2	35	12	32	7	3	11	27	30	17

Source: rsssf.com

=== Results by round ===
Round	1	2	3	4	5	6	7	8	9	10	11	12	13	14	15	16	17	18	19	20	21	22	23	24	25	26	27	28	29	30	31	32	33	34	35	36	37	38	39	40	41	42
Ground	H	A	A	H	H	A	A	H	A	A	A	H	H	A	H	H	H	A	H	A	H	A	A	A	H	A	H	H	A	A	H	A	H	A	H	H	A	A	H	H	A	H
Result	D	W	L	D	W	L	W	D	L	L	W	W	D	L	W	W	L	D	W	D	W	L	W	W	W	W	D	W	L	W	L	D	W	L	W	W	L	L	W	D	L	W
Position	9	2	12	10	6	8	6	7	7	11	9	7	7	10	7	8	11	9	7	8	7	7	7	6	6	4	4	4	4	4	5	5	5	6	5	4	6	7	6	5	6	6

Updated to match(es) played on 2 May 1925. Source: statto.com
A = Away; H = Home; W = Win; D = Draw; L = Loss

== Fixtures and results ==
=== Third Division South ===
Date	Opponents	Venue	Result	Scorers	Attendance
30 Aug 1924	Queens Park Rangers	H	0–0		10,000
3 Sep 1924	Reading	A	1–0	Turnbull	8,270
6 Sep 1924	Charlton Athletic	A	0–1		8,000
11 Sep 1924	Reading	H	1–1	Charlton	6,000
13 Sep 1924	Northampton Town	H	1–0	Gittins	6,000
15 Sep 1924	Brentford	A	0–2		4,000
20 Sep 1924	Watford	A	5–0	Charlton 4, Conner	—
27 Sep 1924	Southend United	H	1–1	Jenkins	9,000
29 Sep 1924	Merthyr Town	A	0–1		4,000
4 Oct 1924	Brighton & Hove Albion	A	1–4	Cook	12,000
11 Oct 1924	Bristol Rovers	A	1–0	Charlton	10,000
18 Oct 1924	Exeter City	H	2–1	Gittins, Lowes	7,000
25 Oct 1924	Plymouth Argyle	H	0–0		12,000
1 Nov 1924	Bristol City	A	0–2		8,000
8 Nov 1924	Swindon Town	H	3–1	Carney, Charlton, Conner	10,000
22 Nov 1924	Norwich City	H	3–0	Nairn, Lowes, Forward	6,000
6 Dec 1924	Millwall	H	2–3	Charlton, Lowes	7,000
13 Dec 1924	Luton Town	A	2–2	Nairn, Conner	—
20 Dec 1924	Gillingham	H	2–0	Lowes 2	8,000
25 Dec 1924	Bournemouth & Boscombe Athletic	A	0–0		6,000
26 Dec 1924	Bournemouth & Boscombe Athletic	H	2–0	Charlton, Gittins	8,000
27 Dec 1924	Queens Park Rangers	A	3–4	Taylor 2, H.White	3,000
10 Jan 1925	Aberdare Athletic	A	3–1	Forward, Taylor, Wetherby	5,000
17 Jan 1925	Northampton Town	A	2–0	Nairn, Taylor	6,000
24 Jan 1925	Watford	H	3–0	Nairn, Charlton, Taylor	8,000
31 Jan 1925	Southend United	A	1–0	Taylor	8,000
7 Feb 1925	Brighton & Hove Albion	H	0–0		12,000
14 Feb 1925	Bristol Rovers	H	4–1	Whitton, Charlton, Turnbull, Hiles	12,000
21 Feb 1925	Exeter City	A	3–4	Turnbull, Forward, Taylor	7,000
28 Feb 1925	Plymouth Argyle	A	2–0	Taylor 2	—
7 Mar 1925	Bristol City	H	0–2		11,800
14 Mar 1925	Swindon Town	A	2–2	F.T.McKenzie, Taylor	8,028
21 Mar 1925	Aberdare Athletic	H	1–0	Turnbull	7,000
28 Mar 1925	Norwich City	A	1–2	Wetherby	5,000
4 Apr 1925	Brentford	H	1–0	Taylor	5,000
10 Apr 1925	Swansea Town	H	3–0	Charlton 2, Lowes	15,000
11 Apr 1925	Millwall	A	0–3		12,000
13 Apr 1925	Swansea Town	A	0–1		22,000
14 Apr 1925	Charlton Athletic	H	2–1	Charlton, Wetherby	6,000
18 Apr 1925	Luton Town	H	1–1	Nairn	7,000
25 Apr 1925	Gillingham	A	0–1		5,000
2 May 1925	Merthyr Town	H	3–0	Lowes 2, Forward	7,000

=== FA Cup ===
Round	Date	Opponents	Venue	Result	Scorers	Attendance	Notes
4Q	15 Nov 1924	Aberdare Athletic	A	0–0		10,000	
4Qr	20 Nov 1924	Aberdare Athletic	H	3–0	Carney, Lowes, Forward	6,000	
5Q	29 Nov 1924	Exeter City	A	1–1	Gittins	11,000	
5Qr	4 Dec 1924	Exeter City	H	3–3	Lowes 2, Nairn	4,600	
5Qr2	8 Dec 1924	Exeter City	N	0–1		5,000	At Ashton Gate

=== Welsh Cup ===
Round	Date	Opponents	Venue	Result	Scorers	Attendance
5	5 Mar 1925	Wellington Town	H	2–0	Taylor, Whitton	
6	19 Mar 1925	Wrexham	H	0–1		3,500

== League table ==
Pos	Team	Pld	W	D	L	F	A	GA	Pts
1	Swansea Town	42	23	11	8	68	35	1.943	57
2	Plymouth Argyle	42	23	10	9	77	38	2.026	56
3	Bristol City	42	22	9	11	60	41	1.463	53
4	Swindon Town	42	20	11	11	66	38	1.737	51
5	Millwall	42	18	13	11	58	38	1.526	49
6	Newport County	42	20	9	13	62	42	1.476	49
7	Exeter City	42	19	9	14	59	48	1.229	47
8	Brighton & Hove Albion	42	19	9	15	59	45	1.311	46
9	Northampton Town	42	20	6	16	51	44	1.159	46
10	Southend United	42	19	5	18	51	61	0.836	43
11	Watford	42	17	9	16	38	47	0.809	43
12	Norwich City	42	14	13	15	53	51	1.039	41
13	Gillingham	42	13	14	15	35	44	0.795	40
14	Reading	42	14	10	18	37	38	0.974	38
15	Charlton Athletic	42	13	12	17	46	48	0.958	38
16	Luton Town	42	10	17	15	49	57	0.860	37
17	Bristol Rovers	42	12	13	17	42	49	0.857	37
18	Aberdare Athletic	42	14	9	19	54	67	0.806	37
19	Queens Park Rangers	42	14	8	20	42	63	0.667	36
20	Bournemouth & Boscombe Athletic	42	13	8	21	40	58	0.690	34
21	Brentford	42	9	7	26	38	91	0.418	25
22	Merthyr Town	42	8	5	29	35	77	0.455	21

Key	
	Division Champions
	Re-elected
	Failed re-election

P = Matches played; W = Matches won; D = Matches drawn; L = Matches lost; F = Goals for; A = Goals against; GA = Goal average; Pts = Points
