= Kenneth Rayment =

Pilot of the Munich air disaster

Kenneth Rayment DFC
- Born: Kenneth Gordon Rayment; 11 March 1921; Wanstead, Essex, England
- Died: 15 March 1958 (aged 37); Rechts der Isar Hospital, Munich, West Germany
- Known for: Co-Pilot during the Munich air disaster
- Military career
- Allegiance: United Kingdom
- Branch: Royal Air Force Volunteer Reserve
- Service years: 1940–1945
- Rank: Flight Lieutenant
- Service number: 126970 (other ranks); 108000 (officer)
- Units: No. 153 Squadron RAF; No. 264 Squadron RAF
- Conflicts: Second World War: North African Campaign; Western European Campaign
- Awards: Distinguished Flying Cross; Mentioned in Despatches

Kenneth Gordon Rayment, DFC (11 March 1921 – 15 March 1958) was a British pilot and decorated Second World War flying ace. On 6 February 1958, he was the co-pilot of BEA flight 609 that was to carry the Manchester United football team and journalists from West Germany to England but which crashed on take-off. This became known as the Munich air disaster. Rayment survived the crash, but died five weeks later of his injuries.

== Early life and education ==
Rayment was born on 11 March 1921 in Wanstead, Essex, England. He was brought up in Woodford Green. In 1937, after leaving school, he joined the Merchant Navy. He served as a deck officer on a route between England and Argentina.

== RAF service ==
On 15 October 1940, Rayment joined the ranks of the Royal Air Force Volunteer Reserve (RAFVR). In March 1941, he started his pilot training with 17 Elementary Flying Training School. He was then promoted to sergeant and sent to Canada to continue his training at 37 Service Flying Training School.

On 1 September 1941, Rayment was commissioned into the RAFVR as a pilot officer (on probation). After spending three months at 56 Operational Training Unit based at RAF Sutton Bridge, in December 1941 he was assigned to No. 153 Squadron RAF. After a few days, he was sent to 62 Operational Training Unit to train as a night fighter pilot. He rejoined No. 153 Squadron in February 1942, and flew Bristol Beaufighters. Between May and August 1942, he was once more training with 62 Operational Training Unit. He then rejoined No. 153 Squadron after leaving the OTU. His commission was confirmed on 1 September 1942.

In December 1942, Rayment was posted to North Africa with his squadron. He was promoted to war substantive flying officer in May 1943. On 2 June 1943, it was announced that he had been mentioned in despatches. On 27 July 1943, he was awarded the Distinguished Flying Cross (DFC). Between July and September 1943, having left No. 153 Squadron, he was stationed in Reghaïa, Algeria.

In September 1943, Rayment returned to England from North Africa. He was promoted to flight lieutenant (war substantive) on 1 September 1943. From September 1943 to April 1944, he was an instructor with 51 Operational Training Unit, based at RAF Cranfield. He then joined No. 264 Squadron RAF, a squadron flying De Havilland Mosquitos. He was posted to France with his squadron in August 1944. His last operational flight in a Mosquito occurred on 20 September 1944. He remained in France until November 1944. He was then seconded to the British Overseas Airways Corporation (BOAC), and flew Lockheed Model 18 Lodestars until the end of the war in 1945.

By the end of the Second World War, Rayment had become a flying ace. He had shot down five German fighters, one Italian plane, and a V-1 flying bomb.

== Civilian career ==
In 1945, Rayment joined British European Airways (BEA) as a pilot. In his early career with BEA, he flew Airspeed Consuls, Dakotas, and Vickers Vikings. In 1953, he started flying Airspeed Ambassadors and Vickers Viscounts as a senior captain. By 1958, he was considering retiring from flying and becoming a farmer. This was after Rayment had to recuperate from his piloting duties for BEA, following a hernia operation in late 1957.

=== Munich air disaster ===
On 6 February 1958, Rayment was the second pilot of a charted flight that was to bring the Manchester United football team, supporters and journalists from Germany back to England. BEA flight 609 crashed on its third attempt to take-off from a slush-covered runway at Munich-Riem Airport, West Germany.

Rayment was knocked unconscious during the crash, and had a broken leg, plus head injuries. Having been rescued from the wreckage, he was taken to Rechts der Isar Hospital in Munich. By 12 February, he was being kept in an oxygen tent. Having never regained consciousness, he died of his injuries on 15 March 1958, aged 37. He was the second crew member to die due to injuries received in the crash at Munich.
