= Ted Croker =

English footballer and administrator

Edgar Alfred Croker CBE (13 February 1924 – 25 December 1992) was an English football player and administrator. He was Secretary of the Football Association from 1973 to 1989.

== Life and career ==
Born in Kingston-upon-Thames in 1924, Croker joined the RAF as a pilot in 1942. He sustained injuries in a crash which hampered his later football career. In the late 1940s and 1950s he played as a defender for Charlton Athletic, Dartford, Headington United (later Oxford United) and Kidderminster Harriers.

He lived in Cheltenham in the 1950s, where he founded the heavy machinery company Liner-Croker Ltd. The company, specializing in earth-moving equipment, grew successfully throughout the 1960s. He sold the company in 1973. The Football Association, anxious to improve the commercial aspects of football, appointed him secretary in 1973 to succeed the retiring Denis Follows. The position was effectively that of chief executive, overseeing the day-to-day running of the FA. In 1974, he proposed the current format for the Charity Shield, with the match to be played between the champions of the top division of the Football League (now the Premier League), and FA Cup winners (or first and second in the League if one team wins both) at Wembley Stadium, as an introduction to each new football season. Much of his time at the FA was dogged by problems. The Heysel Stadium Disaster and the demise of the Home International Championship both occurred during his period of leadership.

In 1987, Croker became president of Cheltenham Town, a post that he occupied until his death.^{†} He was appointed Commander of the Order of the British Empire (CBE) in the 1989 Birthday Honours.

Towards the end of his career Croker suffered from ill-health. He retired from the Football Association in February 1989, to be succeeded by Graham Kelly, who assumed the role of chief executive, rather than secretary. Croker died at the age of 68 on Christmas Day in 1992.

His grandson, Eric Dier, is a professional footballer, who plays as a defender for AS Monaco. His brother, Peter Croker, was also a professional footballer, playing for Charlton Athletic in the 1947 FA Cup Final.
