= The Misfits (1961 film) =

1961 film by John Huston

- Theatrical release poster
- Directed by: John Huston
- Screenplay by: Arthur Miller
- Based on: "The Misfits" (1957 story) by Arthur Miller
- Produced by: Frank E. Taylor
- Starring: Clark Gable; Marilyn Monroe; Montgomery Clift; Thelma Ritter; Eli Wallach
- Cinematography: Russell Metty
- Edited by: George Tomasini
- Music by: Alex North
- Production company: Seven Arts Productions
- Distributed by: United Artists
- Release date: February 1, 1961
- Running time: 125 minutes
- Country: United States
- Language: English
- Budget: $4 million
- Box office: $4.1 million (domestic)

The Misfits is a 1961 American neo-Western romantic drama film directed by John Huston and written by Arthur Miller, who adapted his own 1957 short story. It stars Clark Gable, Marilyn Monroe, and Montgomery Clift, alongside Thelma Ritter and Eli Wallach. The plot centers on a newly divorced woman (Monroe), and her relationships with a friendly landlady (Ritter), an old-school cowboy (Gable), his tow-truck driving and plane-flying best friend (Wallach), and their rodeo-riding, bronco-busting friend (Clift).

The Misfits was the last completed film for both Gable (who died three months before the premiere) and Monroe (who died a year after its release). It was released by United Artists on February 1, 1961, on what would have been star Gable's 60th birthday.

The film was initially a commercial failure, but received critical acclaim for its script and performances. Its reputation has improved over the years, and many critics now consider it to be a masterpiece and one of the best films of the 1960s.

== Plot ==
In Reno, Nevada, 30-year-old Roslyn Tabor seeks a six-week residency divorce from her inattentive husband, Raymond. Afterward, her landlady, Isabelle, takes her to Harrah's cocktail lounge, where they meet an aging cowboy, Gaylord Langland, and his tow-truck driver friend, Guido. Guido mentions an unfinished house he built for his late wife, and later, the group visits the property. After an evening of drinking and dancing, Gaylord drives an inebriated Roslyn home to Reno.

Roslyn and Gaylord eventually move into Guido's unfinished house to complete it together. Gaylord confides his regret over being estranged from his children, and later, when rabbits eat their garden's lettuce, he proposes shooting them—an idea Roslyn opposes. When Guido and Isabelle visit, Guido suggests rounding up wild mustangs for profit. On the way to a rodeo in Dayton, they happen to meet Gaylord's friend Perce Howland, who joins them after Gaylord pays his entry fee. Later, at a bar, tensions flare when a drunk harasses Roslyn.

During the rodeo, Roslyn is disturbed to learn that the horses are forced to buck with a flank strap. Perce is injured after two rides but refuses medical help. Roslyn later finds him unconscious in an alley; upon waking, he expresses gratitude for her compassion and recounts his troubled past. A drunken Gaylord interrupts, claiming he met his children, only to cause a scene when he discovers they have already left town. On the drive home, Guido drunkenly propositions Roslyn. Back at the house, he resumes building while Gaylord asks if she would ever have a child with him—she avoids answering.

The next day, Gaylord, Guido, and Perce set out to capture mustangs, with Roslyn reluctantly accompanying them. She is horrified to learn the horses are destined for slaughter. After they capture several, Roslyn pleads for their release. Gaylord resists, angered when she offers him money. Guido offers to release them if she leaves Gaylord, which she refuses. Perce releases the stallion despite her objections, prompting Gaylord to chase and subdue it before freeing it himself, declaring he simply did not want anyone deciding for him.

As they drive away, Roslyn tells Gaylord she will leave the next day. When they stop to untether his dog, the two share a moment of reconciliation, realizing they still love each other as they drive off into the night.

== Cast ==
- Clark Gable as Gaylord Langland
- Marilyn Monroe as Roslyn Taber
- Montgomery Clift as Perce Howland
- Thelma Ritter as Isabelle Steers
- Eli Wallach as Guido
- Kevin McCarthy as Raymond Taber, Roslyn's husband
- James Barton as Fletcher's grandfather
- Estelle Winwood as the church lady

Uncredited

- Rex Bell as old cowboy
- Philip Mitchell as Charles Steers
- Marietta Tree as Susan

== Production ==
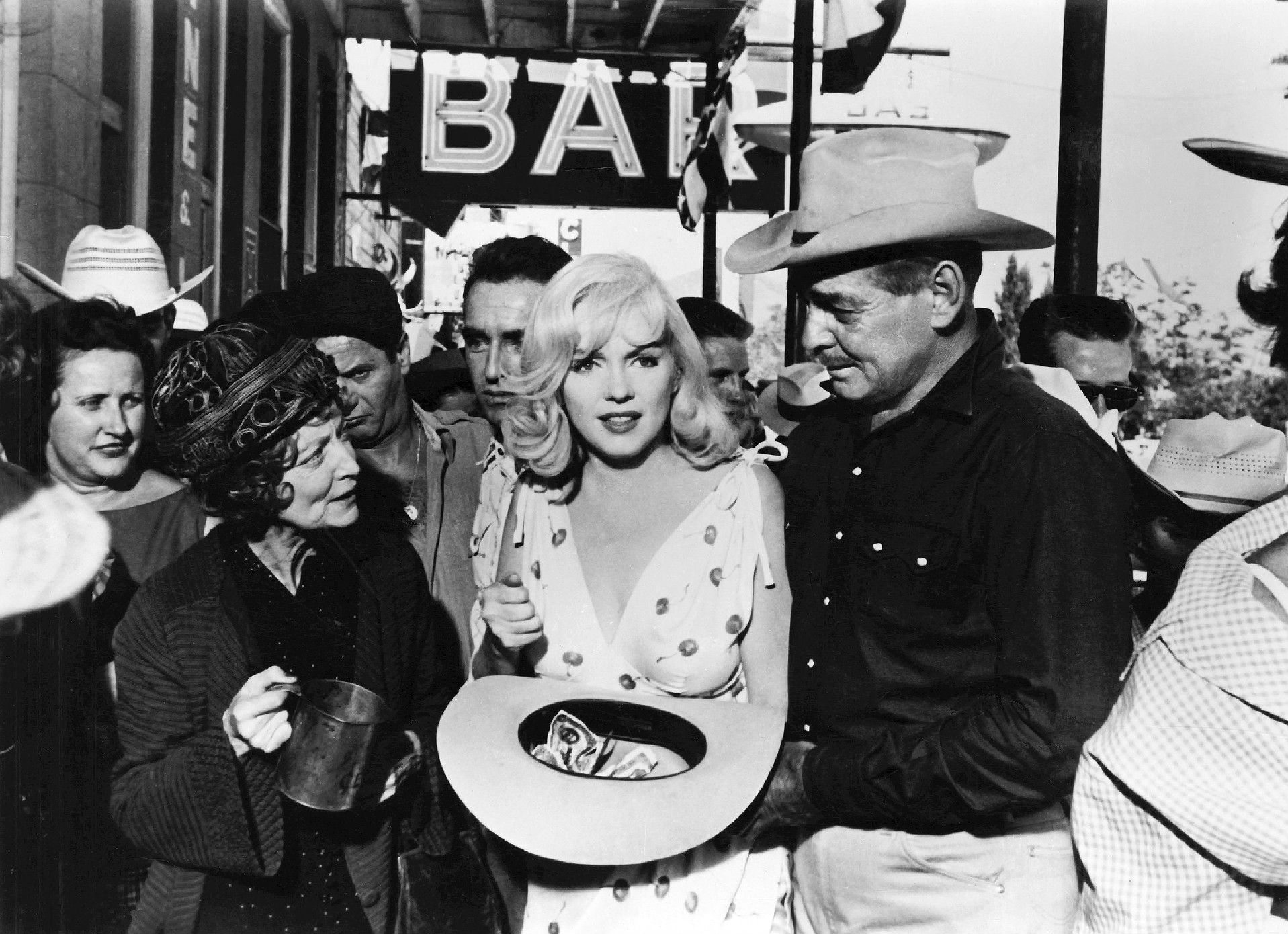
Estelle Winwood, Marilyn Monroe and Clark Gable in foreground, Eli Wallach and Montgomery Clift in background at left

The making of The Misfits was troublesome on several accounts, not the least of which was the sometimes 100 °F (38 °C) heat of the northern Nevada desert and the breakdown of Monroe's marriage to writer Arthur Miller. Miller revised the script throughout the shoot as the concepts of the film developed.

Meanwhile, with her marriage to Arthur Miller troubled, Marilyn Monroe was drinking too much after work and using prescription drugs. According to Huston in a 1981 retrospective interview, he felt "absolutely certain that she was doomed," a conclusion he reached while working on the film: "There was evidence right before me almost every day. She was incapable of rescuing herself or of being rescued by anyone else. And it sometimes affected her work. We had to stop the picture while she went to a hospital for two weeks." Huston shut down production in August 1960 when Monroe went to a hospital for relaxation and depression treatment. Some close-ups after her hospital discharge were shot using limited soft focus. Monroe was nearly always an hour late to the set, sometimes not showing up at all. Monroe spent her nights learning newly written lines with her drama coach Paula Strasberg. Monroe's confidant and masseur, Ralph Roberts, was cast as an ambulance attendant in the film's rodeo scene. The other actors and Huston did not complain to Monroe about her lateness—they knew they needed her to finish the movie. Gable reminisced in The Making of the Misfits with author James Goode saying, "Long ago, if an actor was late, they were fired."

Clark Gable insisted on doing some of his own stunts, but not the scene of being dragged 400 feet (120 m) across the dry lake bed at more than 30 miles per hour (48 km/h). Director John Huston said after Gable's death that he would never have allowed Gable to do the more dangerous mustang stunts.

Veteran B-movie Western actor Rex Bell, who had been married to Clara Bow, made his final film appearance in a brief cameo as an amusing elderly cowboy. Bell was lieutenant governor of Nevada at the time.

Thomas B. Allen was assigned to create drawings of The Misfits as the film was made. Magnum Photos had numerous staff photographers, including Henri Cartier-Bresson, Ernst Haas, Inge Morath, and Eve Arnold assigned to document the making of The Misfits. Inge Morath later married Arthur Miller, Monroe's former husband, a year after the film was released.

During production, the cast's principals stayed at the Mapes Hotel in Reno. Film locations included the Washoe County Court House on Virginia Street, and Quail Canyon, near Pyramid Lake. The bar scene wherein Monroe plays paddle ball and the rodeo scenes were filmed in Dayton, Nevada, east of Carson City. For the final three weeks of shooting, Miller and Monroe moved to the nearby Holiday Hotel and Casino, now the Renaissance Hotel, on Center Street in Reno. The Renaissance Hotel no longer has a casino. The climax of the film takes place during wrangling scenes on a Nevada dry lake twelve miles east of Dayton, near Stagecoach. The area today is known as "Misfits Flat".

Filming was completed on November 4, 1960, twelve days before Clark Gable's death, and The Misfits was released on February 1, 1961, on what would have been Gable's 60th birthday.

== Reception ==
=== Box office ===
The Misfits failed to meet expectations at the box office and has been historically referred to as a "box office disaster" of its day. Despite being shot in black and white, the final cost was about $4 million, which was the estimated budget. The film grossed $4.1 million domestically in its initial US release.

=== Critical response ===
Larry Tubelle of Variety called the film "a robust, high-voltage adventure drama vibrating with explosive emotional histrionics, conceived and executed with a refreshing disdain for superficial and photographic slickness in favor of an uncommonly honest and direct approach." Roger Angell of The New Yorker described the film as "absorbing but erratic," praising the performances while critiquing what it considered heavy-handed symbolism and a lack of narrative cohesion.

Philip K. Scheuer of the Los Angeles Times found the film "fascinating", stating: "It has a seriousness of purpose that most films do not, and by the time it is over it just about gets this seriousness across. Its theme—or one of its themes—is loneliness, the inability to communicate. The reaching out, the groping, can be pitiful and painful to look upon, and it is here—a reaching out whose smallness is intensified by the great size of the background."

The performance of Clark Gable, the last in his career, was praised. Kate Cameron of the New York Daily News wrote: "Gable has never done anything better on the screen, nor has Marilyn Monroe. Gable's acting is vibrant and lusty, hers true to the character as written by Miller." The Guardian wrote Gable's performance "is casually professional as ever, and yet he brings to the ageing cowboy an intensity of feeling one never suspected he possessed." The Chicago Tribune felt Gable "was never better cast as a romancing cowboy who lives each day as it comes. In view of his recent death, the final scenes, in which he asserts his strength and independence, are forceful."

On the other hand, Bosley Crowther of The New York Times was unimpressed, writing the characters "are scatterbrained, whimsical, lonely and, in the case of the character of Miss Monroe, inclined to adore all living creatures and have a quivering revulsion to pain. They are amusing people to be with, for a little while, anyhow. But they are shallow and inconsequential, and that is the dang-busted trouble with this film." The Chicago Tribune was mixed on the film: "Uneven, overly long and talkative, this film proves again that the stage and the screen are different mediums that require different writing techniques. Author Arthur Miller seems to be trying hard to say something, as are all his characters, but it doesn't quite come off." A review in Time magazine felt The Misfits was "a dozen pictures rolled into one. Most of them, unfortunately, are terrible."

The Misfits has received a positive reevaluation, in which it is seen as a significant American drama with enduring relevance. On Rotten Tomatoes, 94% of 32 critics gave the film a positive review. On Metacritic, the film has a weighted score of 77 out of 100, based on 9 critics, indicating "generally favorable reviews."

=== Accolades ===
At the 14th Directors Guild of America Awards, John Huston received a nomination for Outstanding Directing – Feature Film. Marilyn Monroe was honored as "World Film Favorite" at the 19th Golden Globe Awards in 1962, five months before her death. The film also received recognition decades later when it was nominated for inclusion in the American Film Institute's 2005 list, AFI's 100 Years of Film Scores.

== Legacy ==
The Misfits is remembered as the final completed film for both Clark Gable and Marilyn Monroe. Gable suffered a heart attack two days after filming ended and died on November 16, 1960. The film premiered in New York City on February 1, 1961, which would have been Gable's 60th birthday; Monroe and Montgomery Clift attended the premiere, while Arthur Miller appeared with his children. Less than 18 months later, on August 5, 1962, Monroe died of an apparent drug overdose at the age of 36. Her death, combined with Gable's, cast a long shadow over the film's legacy. In her final interview, Monroe—who never knew her father—revealed that she often fantasized Gable was her father, underscoring the personal weight she attached to their collaboration. She later expressed dissatisfaction with both the film and her performance.

The other principal cast members also met poignant fates: James Barton died in 1962; Clift died in 1966 after making only three more films; Thelma Ritter died in 1969; and Eli Wallach outlived all his co-stars, dying in 2014 at age 98.

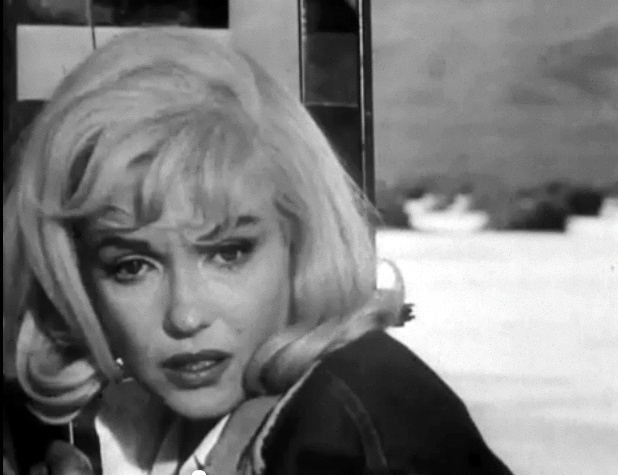
Monroe in The Misfits

The documentary The Legend of Marilyn Monroe (1966) includes footage shot while The Misfits was being made. Miller's autobiography Timebends (1987) described the making of the film. The 2001 PBS documentary Making The Misfits did the same. Primary sources such as The Making of the Misfits by James Goode, Conversations with Marilyn by W.J. Weatherby, and Miller's account, particularly his assertion that The Misfits script was a "valentine" for Monroe, inspired the docu-drama play Misfits by Alex Finlayson, which was commissioned by director Greg Hersov. Misfits premiered at the Royal Exchange Theatre in Manchester, England, in 1996, directed by Hersov and starring Lisa Eichhorn as Marilyn Monroe. Miller's last play Finishing the Picture (2004), although fiction, was based on the events involved in the making of The Misfits.

In August 2018, an unreleased nude scene where Monroe's character exposes herself while dressing after being woken up, and which was thought to have been lost, was discovered.

The film has also been referenced in contemporary artistic discourse, including by artist and writer Amadour, who connects its production in Nevada to broader histories of mid-century entertainment and landscape, including through The Mapes Suite, a project developed in relation to the Mapes Hotel and presented at the Nevada State Museum, Carson City.

== Home media ==
The Misfits was released on Blu-ray by MGM Home Entertainment on May 10, 2011. A Region 1 widescreen DVD edition followed on May 8, 2012.

== See also ==
- List of films about horses
- List of American films of 1961
