= Frank E. Taylor =

American film producer

Frank Eugene Taylor (March 16, 1916 – November 16, 1999) was an American book publisher and movie producer. During his four-decade career in publishing he worked with authors including Vladimir Nabokov, Eldridge Cleaver, and George Orwell. His work as a producer in Hollywood includes the 1961 film The Misfits. Taylor's papers are held at the Lilly Library, Indiana University, Bloomington, Indiana, and include correspondence with Charlie Chaplin, James Agee, Ralph Ellison, and Christopher Isherwood.

== Personal life ==
Frank E. Taylor was born in Malone, New York, and received a bachelor's degree in 1938 from Hamilton College. He married Nan Scallon (later Nan Taylor Abell), radio host and producer, in 1942, and they had four sons before divorcing in 1975. The family entertained Taylor's literary colleagues such as Marshall McLuhan, Alfred Kazin, and Arthur Miller with his wife Marilyn Monroe, during dinner parties at the Taylors' home in Belle Haven, Greenwich, Connecticut.

== Career ==
Pursuing a career in book publishing, Taylor was with Reynal & Hitchcock from 1941 to 1947, becoming editor-in-chief in 1944. There, he saw his first publishing success with Strange Fruit, the 1944 bestselling debut novel by American author Lillian Smith. Dealing with interracial romance, the novel had originally been titled "Jordan is so Chilly" but Taylor encouraged Smith to change the title to "Strange Fruit" in reference to the song protesting the lynching of Black Americans made famous by Billie Holiday. Another of Taylor's successes at Reynal and Hitchcock was Malcolm Lowry's Under the Volcano. Taylor notably also published Arthur Miller, both his 1944 non-fiction Situation Normal, based on Miller's experiences researching the war correspondence of Ernie Pyle, and his 1945 novel Focus, which deals with issues of racism, particularly antisemitism.

In 1948, Taylor joined Random House as editor, scout, and project director. He was an early supporter of Ralph Ellison, who was under contract with Reynal, and moved to Random House along with Taylor to publish his novel Invisible Man. Invisible Man won the U.S. National Book Award for Fiction in 1953, making Ellison the first African American writer to win the award. The book has never been out of print since.

At this time, Taylor was also under contract with Metro-Goldwyn-Mayer and moved with his family to Hollywood. Taylor produced one award-winning, low-budget film noir for MGM in 1950, Mystery Street. After this, he moved to 20th Fox for a spell, but with many friends being blacklisted during the second "red scare," Taylor decided to quit Fox and return to NY and publishing. He did also have one movie near-miss: when he told his friend Malcolm Lowry that he was producing a screen version of F. Scott Fitzgerald's Tender is the Night, Lowry and his wife, Margerie Bonner, proceeded to write a 455-page film script that Taylor felt was "brilliant" but which "quickly sank into oblivion." It was eventually published in 1990 as The Cinema of Malcolm Lowry: A Scholarly Edition of Lowry's Tender Is the Night. There is also a record of his working with W.H. Auden, Chester Kallman and Christopher Isherwood in 1959, on a musical based on Isherwood's 1939 novel Goodbye to Berlin.

Back in New York he was soon hired by Dell Publishing where from 1952 to 1961 he introduced classics in paperback form under the umbrella imprint "Laurel Editions" which included the Laurel Henry James series and the Laurel Poetry Series. Taylor also published James Baldwin's Go Tell It on the Mountain; Grace Metalious's Peyton Place; and Françoise Sagan's Bonjour Tristesse in paperback for Dell. Then in 1959 he was asked by his friends John Huston and Arthur Miller to produce their film The Misfits, so he returned to Hollywood. The Misfits was a commercial failure at the time of its release, but received critical acclaim for its script and performances, and many critics now consider the film to be a masterpiece.

Next, Taylor was publisher and executive officer of Avon Books, then a division of Hearst Corporation. In 1962, he brought in the young editor Peter Mayer, who would eventually succeed him. Mayer introduced Taylor to Henry Roth's 1934 book Call It Sleep and in 1964, Avon printed it for the first time in paperback. A review in The New York Times marked the first time a paperback appeared on its Book Review's front page.

From 1965 to 1970, Taylor was editor-in-chief and general manager of the McGraw-Hill Book Company's trade-book division. Here he published such diverse and important books as the Black Panther Eldridge Cleaver's memoir Soul on Ice; Marshall McLuhan's Understanding Media; Leo Rosten's The Joys of Yiddish; Desmond Morris' Naked Ape and Human Zoo; and Germaine Greer's The Female Eunuch. He also hired the graphic and interior designer Milton Glaser. In 1965, upon hearing of the discovery of The Madrid Codices I–II in the National Library of Spain, Taylor headed for Madrid, where he negotiated with the Spanish Government for permission for McGraw-Hill to publish a five‐volume set. In '67 Taylor visited Vladimir Nabokov in Montreux, Switzerland, and persuaded him to leave his current publisher, Putnam, for McGraw-Hill. Nabokov's first book with Taylor at McGraw was Ada or Ardor: A Family Chronicle, followed by "Poems and Problems". In 1969, after the New Yorker published Daniel Lang's "Casualties of War", about the Incident on Hill 192 – the kidnapping and murder of a young Vietnamese woman in the Vietnam War – Taylor put Lang's piece out in paperback.

Taylor left McGraw-Hill unceremoniously in 1970 after a reorganization that "pushed him aside." For the next three years, Taylor was publisher of The Patent Trader, a newspaper in Westchester County, N.Y. He was briefly with Mitchell Beazley, where in 1977 he published The Joy of Gay Sex with Charles Silverstein and Edmund White, and for the last few years of his career he had his own imprint, Frank E. Taylor Books, with Praeger. At Praeger he continued to publish important works such as Howard A. Wilcox' Hothouse Earth, an early book about climate change, and Mark Vonnegut's The Eden Express, both in 1975. Frank Taylor retired in 1979 and spent his final years in Key West, Florida, in an openly gay relationship with the author Stephen Roos. He reconnected with his old friend Ralph Ellison; joined the board of the Key West Literary Seminar, and was an associate editor of the Solares Hill newspaper.

== Notable publications ==
- 1942 Alfred Kazin – On Native Grounds
- 1944 Karl Shapiro - "V Letters"
- 1944 Lillian Smith – Strange Fruit
- 1944 Arthur Miller – Situation Normal
- 1945 Arthur Miller – Focus
- 1946 George Orwell - Dickens, Dali and Others
- 1947 Malcolm Lowry – Under the Volcano
- 1947 Richard Wilbur – The Beautiful Changes, and Other Poems
- 1952 Ralph Ellison – Invisible Man
- 1953 James Baldwin – Go Tell It on the Mountain
- 1954 Françoise Sagan – Bonjour Tristesse
- 1956 Grace Metalious – Peyton Place
- 1957 Evelyn Waugh – The Loved One
- 1959 James Beard – The James Beard Cookbook
- 1964 Henry Roth – Call It Sleep
- 1964 Marshall McLuhan – Understanding Media
- 1967 Desmond Morris – Naked Ape
- 1968 Eldridge Cleaver – Soul on Ice
- 1968 Leo Rosten – The Joys of Yiddish
- 1969 Vladimir Nabokov - Ada or Ardor: A Family Chronicle
- 1969 Desmond Morris – Human Zoo
- 1969 Daniel Lang – Casualties of War
- 1969 Marshall McLuhan – War and Peace in the Global Village
- 1969 Clifford Irving – Fake
- 1970 Germaine Greer – The Female Eunuch
- 1975 Howard A. Wilcox – Hothouse Earth
- 1975 Mark Vonnegut – The Eden Express
- 1977 Charles Silverstein and Edmund White – The Joy of Gay Sex
