= James Thain =

British aviator

- Born: 8 February 1921; Bermondsey, London, England
- Died: 6 August 1975 (aged 54); Bracknell, Berkshire, England
- Occupations: Aviator, farmer
- Spouse: Ruby Violet Thain (13.06.1913-27.11.1998)
- Military career
- Allegiance: United Kingdom
- Branch: Royal Air Force
- Rank: Flight lieutenant
- Conflicts: Second World War

James Thain (8 February 1921 – 6 August 1975) was a British aviator and former Royal Air Force officer. He was the pilot in command aboard BEA Flight 609 when it crashed in the 1958 Munich air disaster.

== Military career ==
Thain started his career as a Royal Air Force sergeant. He was later promoted to warrant officer and was given an emergency commission as an acting pilot officer in April 1944. He was promoted to pilot officer on probation in September that year. He was subsequently made a flight lieutenant in May 1948, receiving a permanent commission in that rank in 1952. He retired from the RAF to join British European Airways (BEA).

== The Munich incident, retirement and death ==
On 6 February 1958, Thain was the pilot in command of an Airspeed AS.57 Ambassador (Lord Burghley, G-ALZU) flying out of Munich. The aircraft was carrying the Manchester United football team back from a match in Yugoslavia.

After two failed take off attempts, caused by problems with boost surging in one of the Ambassador's engines, Thain chose to make a third try, hoping to stay on schedule, rather than remain overnight for maintenance at Munich. The aircraft failed to take off and crashed, killing twenty-three people. Twenty people died on board, and three died later in the hospital.

The German airport authorities blamed Thain for the accident at the time, saying he did not de-ice the aircraft's wings, despite eyewitness statements indicating de-icing was not required. On Christmas Day 1960 he was dismissed by BEA and spent the next decade trying to clear his name. He never flew for an airline again.

It was later learned that slush on the runway had made it impossible for the Ambassador to gain flying speed. In 1969, an inquiry for the UK government’s Board of Trade concluded that Thain was not to blame for the accident. Despite this finding, German authorities continued to blame Thain.

Retiring to his poultry farm in southern England, Thain died after suffering a heart attack on 6 August 1975, at the age of 54, in Berkshire.

== Sources ==
- Stewart, Stanley (1987). Air Disasters. London: Guild Publishing. ISBN 0-09-956200-6.
