= Harold Jenkins (footballer) =

Welsh footballer and cricketer (1902–1981)

- Born: 17 November 1902; Newport, Monmouthshire, Wales
- Died: 1981 (aged 78–79); Derby, Derbyshire, England
Association football career
Senior career*
Years	Team	Apps	(Gls)
1924–1925	Newport County	3	(1)
- * Club domestic league appearances and goals
- Cricket career

Cricket information

Domestic team information
- Years: Team
- 1923–1934: Monmouthshire

Harold Hughes Jenkins (17 November 1902 – 1981) was a Welsh footballer and minor counties cricketer.

Jenkins was born in Newport, Monmouthshire. He had a brief football career as an amateur for Newport County, signing in July 1924. He played in three matches in the 1924–25 Football League Third Division South, scoring one goal against Southend United. He was also an amateur cricketer for Monmouthshire, playing minor counties cricket for the county from 1923 to 1934, making 44 appearances in the Minor Counties Championship. He died at Derby towards the end of 1981.
