= 1925–26 Newport County A.F.C. season =

Welsh association football club season

Newport County
1925–26 season
- Manager: Jimmy Hindmarsh
- Stadium: Somerton Park
- Third Division South: 17th
- FA Cup: 2nd round
- Welsh Cup: Semi-final
- Top goalscorer: League: Davis (20); All: Davis (21)
- Highest home attendance: 11,232 vs Brighton & Hove Albion (29 August 1925)
- Lowest home attendance: 3,284 vs Norwich City (1 May 1926)
- Average home league attendance: 5,976
Home colours	Away colours

The 1925–26 season was Newport County's sixth season in the Football League, fifth season in the Third Division South and sixth season overall in the third tier.

== Season review ==
=== Results summary ===
Overall								Home						Away					
Pld	W	D	L	GF	GA	GAv	Pts	W	D	L	GF	GA	Pts	W	D	L	GF	GA	Pts
42	14	10	18	64	74	0.865	38	11	5	5	39	27	27	3	5	13	25	47	11

Source: rsssf.com

=== Results by round ===
Round	1	2	3	4	5	6	7	8	9	10	11	12	13	14	15	16	17	18	19	20	21	22	23	24	25	26	27	28	29	30	31	32	33	34	35	36	37	38	39	40	41	42
Ground	H	A	A	H	H	A	A	H	H	A	H	H	A	H	A	H	A	A	A	H	H	A	H	A	H	A	A	H	A	H	A	H	A	H	A	A	H	H	A	H	A	H
Result	W	D	L	W	D	D	W	L	L	L	D	D	L	L	L	W	L	D	L	W	W	L	W	W	W	L	L	W	L	W	L	W	D	D	L	L	L	W	W	L	D	D
Position	10	8	11	10	7	7	6	6	8	12	13	15	17	18	19	17	19	19	21	21	18	19	18	14	12	14	14	12	14	12	15	12	12	13	15	15	17	15	14	16	17	17

Updated to match(es) played on 1 May 1926. Source: statto.com
A = Away; H = Home; W = Win; D = Draw; L = Loss

== Fixtures and results ==
=== Third Division South ===
Date	Opponents	Venue	Result	Scorers	Attendance
29 Aug 1925	Brighton & Hove Albion	H	4–3	Davis 3, Taylor	11,232
3 Sep 1925	Charlton Athletic	A	0–0		4,968
5 Sep 1925	Luton Town	A	2–4	Davis 2	6,816
12 Sep 1925	Queens Park Rangers	H	4–1	Davis 3, Lowes	8,834
17 Sep 1925	Charlton Athletic	H	0–0		6,152
19 Sep 1925	Bristol Rovers	A	2–2	Davis 2	4,096
23 Sep 1925	Bournemouth & Boscombe Athletic	A	2–0	Lowes, OG	4,137
26 Sep 1925	Swindon Town	H	0–4		8,144
1 Oct 1925	Bournemouth & Boscombe Athletic	H	1–2	Davis	5,092
3 Oct 1925	Exeter City	A	1–2	Gittins	8,206
10 Oct 1925	Reading	H	1–1	Nairn	7,053
17 Oct 1925	Aberdare Athletic	H	0–0		8,083
24 Oct 1925	Northampton Town	A	0–2		7,987
31 Oct 1925	Brentford	H	2–3	Taylor, Cook	4,933
7 Nov 1925	Watford	A	1–5	Coates	5,393
14 Nov 1925	Southend United	H	1–0	Davis	4,503
21 Nov 1925	Plymouth Argyle	A	0–3		12,495
19 Dec 1925	Norwich City	A	0–0		4,660
25 Dec 1925	Merthyr Town	A	1–4	Drinnan	5,716
26 Dec 1925	Merthyr Town	H	3–1	Carney 3	7,882
28 Dec 1925	Bristol City	H	1–0	Carney	4,593
2 Jan 1926	Brighton & Hove Albion	A	1–2	Carney	7,398
16 Jan 1926	Luton Town	H	2–1	Coates, Drinnan	4,498
23 Jan 1926	Queens Park Rangers	A	2–0	Carney, Cook	6,385
30 Jan 1926	Bristol Rovers	H	3–1	Carney, Cook, Coates	3,472
6 Feb 1926	Swindon Town	A	1–2	Carney	5,687
10 Feb 1926	Crystal Palace	A	2–4	Forward 2	4,228
13 Feb 1926	Exeter City	H	3–0	Davis 2, Drinnan	5,437
20 Feb 1926	Reading	A	1–2	Davis	11,705
25 Feb 1926	Millwall	H	1–0	Forward	4,425
27 Feb 1926	Aberdare Athletic	A	0–2		4,346
6 Mar 1926	Northampton Town	H	3–0	Coates, Smith, Drinnan	5,293
13 Mar 1926	Brentford	A	3–3	Davis 2, Coates	9,643
20 Mar 1926	Watford	H	3–3	Carney 2, Drinnan	5,282
27 Mar 1926	Southend United	A	1–4	Drinnan	6,124
2 Apr 1926	Gillingham	A	0–2		7,138
3 Apr 1926	Plymouth Argyle	H	0–3		7,343
5 Apr 1926	Gillingham	H	4–0	Drinnan 2, Gittins, Davis	5,500
10 Apr 1926	Bristol City	A	2–1	Carney, Davis	9,802
17 Apr 1926	Crystal Palace	H	2–3	Smith, Drinnan	4,477
24 Apr 1926	Millwall	A	3–3	Davis, Lowes, Drinnan	12,884
1 May 1926	Norwich City	H	1–1	OG	3,284

=== FA Cup ===
Round	Date	Opponents	Venue	Result	Scorers	Attendance
1	28 Nov 1925	Weymouth	A	1–0	Taylor	3,465
2	12 Dec 1925	Northampton Town	H	1–3	Drinnan	10,266

=== Welsh Cup ===
Round	Date	Opponents	Venue	Result	Scorers	Attendance
5	18 Mar 1926	Barry	H	0–0		
5r	24 Mar 1926	Barry	A	3–2	Coates 2, Drinnan	
6	29 Mar 1926	Merthyr Town	A	1–1	Carney	
6r	12 Apr 1926	Merthyr Town	H	2–0	Carney 2	
SF	21 Apr 1926	Ebbw Vale	A	1–2	Davis	

== League table ==
Pos	Team	Pld	W	D	L	F	A	GA	Pts
1	Reading	42	23	11	8	77	52	1.481	57
2	Plymouth Argyle	42	24	8	10	107	67	1.597	56
3	Millwall	42	21	11	10	73	39	1.872	53
4	Bristol City	42	21	9	12	72	51	1.412	51
5	Brighton & Hove Albion	42	19	9	14	84	73	1.151	47
6	Swindon Town	42	20	6	16	69	64	1.078	46
7	Luton Town	42	18	7	17	80	75	1.067	43
8	Bournemouth & Boscombe Athletic	42	17	9	16	75	91	0.824	43
9	Aberdare Athletic	42	17	8	17	74	66	1.121	42
10	Gillingham	42	17	8	17	53	49	1.082	42
11	Southend United	42	19	4	19	78	73	1.068	42
12	Northampton Town	42	17	7	18	82	80	1.025	41
13	Crystal Palace	42	19	3	20	75	79	0.949	41
14	Merthyr Town	42	14	11	17	69	75	0.920	39
15	Watford	42	15	9	18	73	89	0.820	39
16	Norwich City	42	15	9	18	58	73	0.795	39
17	Newport County	42	14	10	18	64	74	0.865	38
18	Brentford	42	16	6	20	69	94	0.723	38
19	Bristol Rovers	42	15	6	21	66	69	0.957	36
20	Exeter City	42	15	5	22	72	70	1.029	35
21	Charlton Athletic	42	11	13	18	48	68	0.706	35
22	Queens Park Rangers	42	6	9	27	37	84	0.440	21

Key	
	Division Champions
	Re-elected
	Failed re-election

P = Matches played; W = Matches won; D = Matches drawn; L = Matches lost; F = Goals for; A = Goals against; GA = Goal average; Pts = Points
