= Frank Taylor (English cricketer) =

English cricketer

Personal information
- Born: 4 May 1855; Rochdale, Lancashire
- Died: 14 August 1936 (aged 81); Cheadle, Cheshire
- Batting: Right-handed

Domestic team information
- Years: Team
- 1873: Gloucestershire
- 1874 – 1888: Lancashire
- Source: Cricinfo, 4 April 2014

Frank Taylor (4 May 1855 – 14 August 1936) was an English cricketer who was active from 1873 to 1888. He was born in Rochdale and died in Cheadle, Cheshire. He made his first-class debut in 1873 and appeared in 55 matches as a right-handed batsman who bowled roundarm, playing for Gloucestershire and Lancashire. He scored 1,492 runs with a highest score of 96 and took three wickets with a best performance of one for 4.
