= Frank Trafford Taylor =

Frank Trafford Taylor, KC (1891 – November 1, 1943), was a Canadian lawyer, and the president of Kiwanis International.

== Biography ==
Taylor was born in Hamilton, Ontario, Canada, the son of William Taylor and Anne Hoare-Trafford. He was married twice, first in 1914 to Agnes Buchannan Morrison, until her death in 1928. They had two children. He later remarried, to Lilian Long, in 1935. He was a descendant of Sir Edmund Trafford KB of the de Trafford baronets.

== Career ==
Taylor received a B.A. from the University of Toronto and an LL.B. from the University of Manitoba. In 1922, he was appointed solicitor for the City of St. Boniface, holding the position until his death. He was also solicitor for the Manitoba Power Commission, and represented the Province of Manitoba at the Privy Council of the United Kingdom in London. He was made a King's Counsel in 1934. He also served as President of the Manitoba Liberal Party.

Taylor was President of Kiwanis International from 1938 to 1939, the second Canadian to do so. While President, he founded the Kiwanis International Fund in 1939

He died at his Winnipeg home on November 1, 1943, and was buried in Elmwood Cemetery. Taylor Avenue in the neighborhood of Tuxedo, Winnipeg, was named after him for his contributions to Manitoba.

The Manitoba Historical Society listed Taylor as one of Manitoba's "Prominent and Pioneering Peoples" in 2007.
