= Frank Taylor (journalist) =

English sports journalist

Frank Taylor OBE
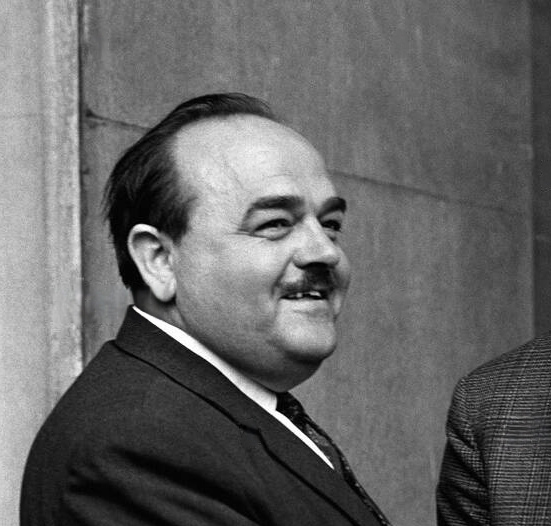
- Born: 7 December 1920; Barrow-in-Furness, Lancashire, England
- Died: 19 July 2002 (aged 81); London, England
- Notable work: "The Day a Team Died" (1960)

John Frederick "Frank" Taylor, OBE (7 December 1920 – 19 July 2002) was an English sports journalist and President of AIPS in 1973–1977 and 1981–1993. He was also President and former of UEPS – the biggest continental section of AIPS.

== Early life ==
Born in 1920 in Barrow-in-Furness, Lancashire, Taylor was the son of a shipyard engineer, and attended Barrow Grammar School. He fought in the Second World War as a volunteer with the Royal Air Force. In his early days, Taylor was involved in athletics.

== Journalism ==
Taylor had his first experience as a journalist in 1938 at the Barrow Guardian. Demobilisation in 1946 was followed by work for the North-West Evening Mail in Barrow, and the Sheffield Telegraph. At the end of 1950, he joined the News Chronicle (1953–61).

On 6 February 1958, Taylor was travelling with the Manchester United team and was the only sports journalist to survive the Munich air disaster. He suffered multiple injuries and spent six months in hospital. Later, he would contribute to many books and television documentaries about the disaster, such as The Day a Team Died (1960). After recovering from his injuries, he wrote for the Daily Mail, the Daily Herald and The Sun.

In 1961, Taylor would become a sports columnist for the Daily Mirror (1961–85), one of the most widely read newspapers in Europe. He reported on the Olympic Games without interruption from 1960 in Rome to 1992 in Barcelona.

In 1973, his career culminated when he became president of the Association Internationale de la Presse Sportive (AIPS) (The World Association of Sports Writers), at the 37th Congress in London. At this congress, Félix Lévitan and Antoine Herbauts transferred their leadership to Great Britain. Frank Taylor was appointed as president and Bobby Naidoo was appointed as general secretary.

In 1977, the UESP (AIPS – Europe biggest continent section of AIPS) was created following a suggestion by Taylor.

Between 1981 and 1993, Frank Taylor and Massimo Della Pergola sought to give AIPS a powerful and prestigious image at all levels.

== Family life ==
Taylor died of cancer in London in 2002 aged 81. He is survived by his wife Peggy and two journalist sons, Andrew MacDonald, of the Financial Times, and Alastair, of The Sun.

== Awards and honours ==
In 1973, Taylor was appointed an Officer of the Order of the British Empire (OBE) for his services to sport and sports journalism.

In 1977, he would receive the Queen's Silver Jubilee Medal.

Honorary member of the British Sports Writers' Association.

== Memory ==
The European Sportsman and Sportswoman of the Year Award was named the Frank Taylor Trophy since 2003 in honour of the former president of both AIPS and UEPS.

== Bibliography ==
- Frank Taylor The Day a Team Died. – Ed. Souvenir Press Limited, 2012. – 194 p. ISBN 9780285632622
- Matt – United – and Me by Murphy, Jimmy as told to Frank Taylor. – London: Souvenir Press, 1968. – First Edition. – 186 p. ISBN 9780285501843
- Taylor, Frank Association football (Handbooks for sportsmen). – Publisher: FOYLE (January 1, 1964). – 90 p. – ASIN B0000CM9ZK
- Taylor, Frank OBE at al (2001) [1998]. The Official Manchester United Illustrated Encyclopedia (3rd ed.). London: Manchester United Books. ISBN 0-233-99964-7
