= 1923–24 Newport County A.F.C. season =

Welsh association football club season

Newport County
1923–24 season
- Manager: Jimmy Hindmarsh
- Stadium: Somerton Park
- Third Division South: 10th
- FA Cup: 4th qualifying round
- Welsh Cup: Semi-final
- Top goalscorer: League: Conner (16); All: Conner/Lowes (18)
- Highest home attendance: 12,000 vs Swansea Town (21 April 1924)
- Lowest home attendance: 6,000 vs Reading (22 March 1924)/Brentford (22 April 1924)
- Average home league attendance: 8,300
Home colours	Away colours

The 1923–24 season was Newport County's fourth season in the Football League, third consecutive season in the Third Division South and fourth season overall in the third tier.

== Season review ==
=== Results summary ===
Overall								Home						Away					
Pld	W	D	L	GF	GA	GAv	Pts	W	D	L	GF	GA	Pts	W	D	L	GF	GA	Pts
42	17	9	16	56	64	0.875	43	15	4	2	39	15	34	2	5	14	17	49	9

Source: rsssf.com

=== Results by round ===
Round	1	2	3	4	5	6	7	8	9	10	11	12	13	14	15	16	17	18	19	20	21	22	23	24	25	26	27	28	29	30	31	32	33	34	35	36	37	38	39	40	41	42
Ground	H	A	A	H	H	A	A	H	A	A	H	A	H	H	A	H	A	H	A	A	H	H	H	A	A	H	A	H	H	A	A	H	A	H	A	A	A	H	H	H	A	H
Result	W	L	L	W	W	W	L	D	D	L	L	L	W	W	L	W	L	L	L	D	D	W	W	L	D	W	D	D	W	L	D	W	L	W	W	L	L	W	W	W	L	D
Position	1	14	17	15	7	4	6	7	8	10	13	16	12	10	12	12	14	14	15	15	14	12	11	11	12	11	11	12	12	12	11	10	11	10	10	10	12	10	10	9	10	10

Updated to match(es) played on 3 May 1924. Source: statto.com
A = Away; H = Home; W = Win; D = Draw; L = Loss

== Fixtures and results ==
=== Third Division South ===
Date	Opponents	Venue	Result	Scorers	Attendance
25 Aug 1923	Exeter City	H	2–0	Lowes, Cook	10,000
29 Aug 1923	Portsmouth	A	0–5		7,353
1 Sep 1923	Exeter City	A	0–5		8,000
6 Sep 1923	Portsmouth	H	2–1	Lowes, Cook	8,000
8 Sep 1923	Southend United	H	5–0	Conner 2, Belle 2, Lowes	9,000
12 Sep 1923	Queens Park Rangers	A	3–0	Lowes 2, Bell	10,000
15 Sep 1923	Southend United	A	0–2		10,000
22 Sep 1923	Northampton Town	H	1–1	Bell	9,500
29 Sep 1923	Northampton Town	A	0–0		10,000
6 Oct 1923	Charlton Athletic	A	1–2	Bell	5,000
13 Oct 1923	Charlton Athletic	H	0–1		9,000
20 Oct 1923	Gillingham	A	1–2	Bell	7,000
27 Oct 1923	Gillingham	H	2–1	Bell 2	8,000
3 Nov 1923	Norwich City	H	1–0	Charlton	7,800
10 Nov 1923	Norwich City	A	1–3	Conner	7,000
1 Dec 1923	Swindon Town	H	3–0	Charlton, Bell, Lowes	8,000
8 Dec 1923	Swindon Town	A	0–3		4,626
15 Dec 1923	Plymouth Argyle	H	1–2	Lowes	8,000
22 Dec 1923	Plymouth Argyle	A	2–3	Nicholls 2	9,000
25 Dec 1923	Merthyr Town	A	3–3	Conner 3	6,000
26 Dec 1923	Merthyr Town	H	4–4	Lowes 2, Carney, Nicholls	8,000
29 Dec 1923	Watford	H	1–0	Cook	8,000
1 Jan 1924	Queens Park Rangers	H	2–1	Lowes 2	8,000
5 Jan 1924	Watford	A	2–8	Conner 2	—
26 Jan 1924	Brentford	A	0–0		5,000
2 Feb 1924	Bristol Rovers	H	1–0	Conner	7,000
9 Feb 1924	Bristol Rovers	A	0–0		8,000
16 Feb 1924	Brighton & Hove Albion	H	0–0		7,000
1 Mar 1924	Luton Town	H	1–0	Charlton	9,000
8 Mar 1924	Luton Town	A	0–2		5,000
15 Mar 1924	Reading	A	1–1	Conner	8,000
22 Mar 1924	Reading	H	2–0	Conner, Lowes	6,000
26 Mar 1924	Brighton & Hove Albion	A	0–4		3,000
29 Mar 1924	Bournemouth & Boscombe Athletic	H	2–0	Conner, Lowes	8,000
5 Apr 1924	Bournemouth & Boscombe Athletic	A	1–0	Conner	4,000
12 Apr 1924	Millwall	A	1–2	Cook	15,000
18 Apr 1924	Swansea Town	A	1–2	Nicholls	16,000
19 Apr 1924	Millwall	H	2–1	Ogley, Conner	10,000
21 Apr 1924	Swansea Town	H	4–1	Conner, Lowes, Gittins, Ogley	12,000
22 Apr 1924	Brentford	H	3–2	Conner, Lowes, Gittins	6,000
26 Apr 1924	Aberdare Athletic	A	0–2		4,000
3 May 1924	Aberdare Athletic	H	0–0		8,000

=== FA Cup ===
Round	Date	Opponents	Venue	Result	Scorers	Attendance
4Q	17 Nov 1923	Exeter City	A	0–2		10,000

=== Welsh Cup ===
Round	Date	Opponents	Venue	Result	Scorers	Attendance
3	14 Feb 1924	Llanelly	H	5–2	Lowes 3, Conner 2	2,900
4	17 Mar 1924	Cardiff City	H	1–1	Charlton	5,500
4r	24 Mar 1924	Cardiff City	A	0–0		5,000
4r2	31 Mar 1924	Cardiff City	H	0–0	Charlton	4,000
4r3	10 Apr 1924	Cardiff City	A	3–0	Carney, Charlton, Nicholls	2,000
SF	16 Apr 1924	Wrexham	A	0–1		7,500

== League table ==
Pos	Team	Pld	W	D	L	F	A	GA	Pts
1	Portsmouth	42	24	11	7	87	30	2.900	59
2	Plymouth Argyle	42	23	9	10	70	34	2.059	55
3	Millwall	42	22	10	10	64	38	1.684	54
4	Swansea Town	42	22	8	12	60	48	1.250	52
5	Brighton & Hove Albion	42	21	9	12	68	37	1.838	51
6	Swindon Town	42	17	13	12	58	44	1.318	47
7	Luton Town	42	16	14	12	50	44	1.136	46
8	Northampton Town	42	17	11	14	64	47	1.362	45
9	Bristol Rovers	42	15	13	14	52	46	1.136	43
10	Newport County	42	17	9	16	56	64	0.875	43
11	Norwich City	42	16	8	18	60	59	1.017	40
12	Aberdare Athletic	42	12	14	16	45	58	0.776	38
13	Merthyr Town	42	11	16	15	45	65	0.692	38
14	Charlton Athletic	42	11	15	16	38	45	0.844	37
15	Gillingham	42	12	13	17	43	58	0.741	37
16	Exeter City	42	15	7	20	37	52	0.712	37
17	Brentford	42	14	8	20	54	71	0.761	36
18	Reading	42	13	9	20	51	57	0.985	35
19	Southend United	42	12	10	20	53	84	0.631	34
20	Watford	42	9	15	18	45	54	0.833	33
21	Bournemouth & Boscombe Athletic	42	11	11	20	40	65	0.615	33
22	Queens Park Rangers	42	11	9	22	37	77	0.481	31

Key	
	Division Champions
	Re-elected
	Failed re-election

P = Matches played; W = Matches won; D = Matches drawn; L = Matches lost; F = Goals for; A = Goals against; GA = Goal average; Pts = Points
