= Frank Taylor (Scottish footballer) =

Scottish footballer

Personal information
- Full name: Francis Perry Taylor
- Date of birth: 12 October 1909
- Place of birth: Plantation, Scotland
- Position: Outside forward

Senior career*
Years	Team	Apps	(Gls)
1929–1935	Queen's Park	48	(14)

International career
1930–1932	Scotland Amateurs	2	(0)
- * Club domestic league appearances and goals

Francis Perry Taylor (born 12 October 1909, date of death unknown) was a Scottish amateur footballer who played as an outside forward in the Scottish League for Queen's Park. He was capped by Scotland at amateur level.
