= Frank Hamilton Taylor =

American artist, illustrator, and author

Frank Hamilton Taylor (April 21, 1846–1927) was an artist, illustrator, and author who lived in Philadelphia, Pennsylvania. He worked for newspapers and magazines, painted watercolors, illustrated, and wrote and illustrated a book on Philadelphia during the American Civil War. He was part of a group that travelled with Ulysses S. Grant in 1880 before Grant's unsuccessful campaign for reelection.

Taylor was born in Rochester, New York. He had an internship in Philadelphia in 1865 at a lithography firm. The city had a thriving publishing industry and art community, and by 1870 Taylor established his lithography firm and was an artist for various newspapers and publications in the city. Taylor also collaborated on guidebooks and publications about the city and its buildings including Philadelphia in the Civil War and the Official Office Building Directory and Architectural Handbook of Philadelphia. He semi-retired in 1910 to devote himself to painting watercolors, doing washes, and drawing Philadelphia.

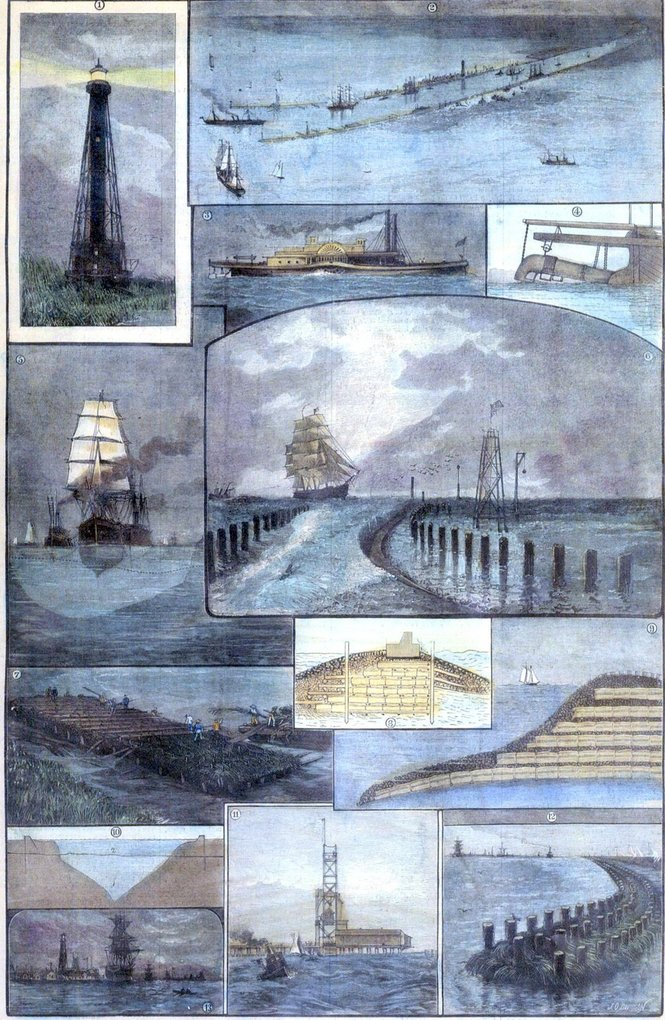
Jetties and Port Eads on the lower Mississippi in Louisiana in 1878 published in Harper's Weekly

He photographed Green's Hotel.

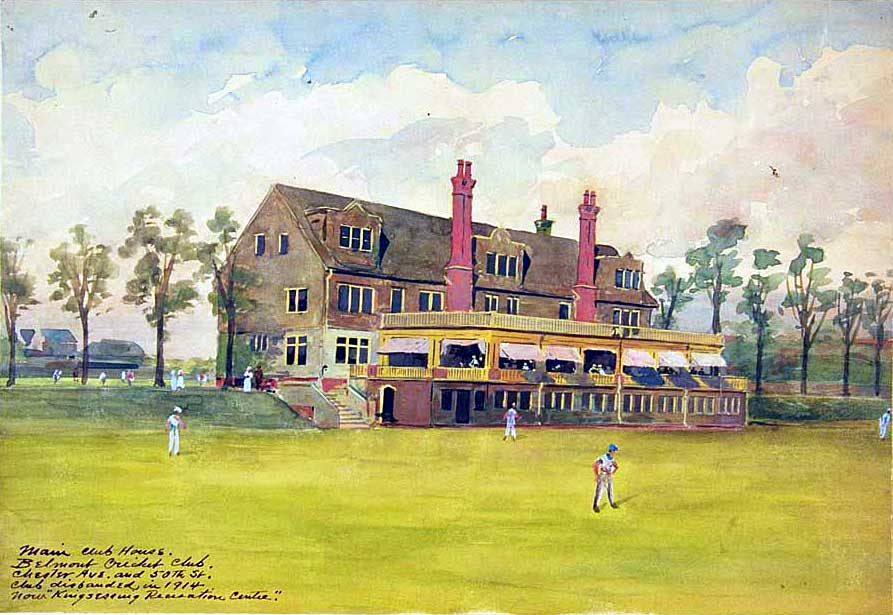
Belmont Cricket Club's clubhouse at Chester Avenue and 50th Street in west Philadelphia

Taylor donated a large collection of photographs to the Free Library of Philadelphia in 1922. The libraries at the University of Pennsylvania have a collection of his work.

He made images of the southern United States, Nassau, and the Canadian province of Quebec. Illustrator Frank Walter Taylor was his son. He accompanied former president Ulysses S. Grant, General Phillip Sheridan, and their wives to Florida, Cuba, and Mexico in 1880. He made depictions of the Thousand Islands.

Margaret G. Taylor was his wife. Drexel University has artworks by him and a carpet bag of his wife's in their collection.

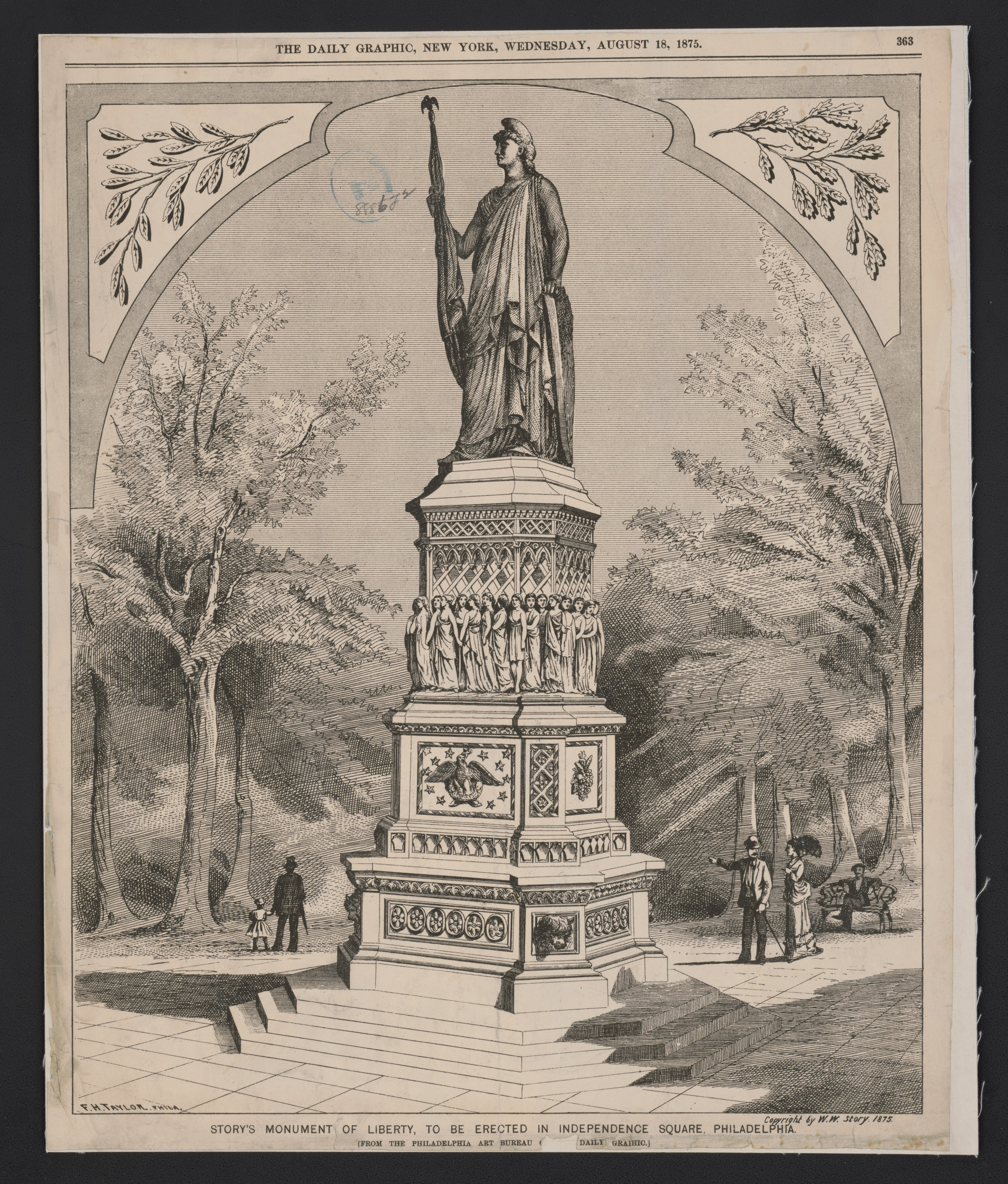
1875 print in the Daily Graphic of New York of William Wetmore Story's monument of Liberty to be erected in Independence Square

Nancy Louise Gustke wrote a doctoral dissertation on him at the University of New Hampshire in 1991 and her book The Special Artist in American Culture; a biography of Frank Hamilton Taylor (1846–1927) was published in 1995.

== Publications ==
- Philadelphia in the Civil War, 1861-1865 (1913), author and illustrator
