= Frank Taylor (footballer, born 1887) =

English footballer

Personal information
- Full name: Frank Taylor
- Date of birth: 1887
- Date of death: January 1928 (aged 40–41)
- Positions: Outside left; centre forward

Senior career*
Years	Team	Apps	(Gls)
–	Lincoln Liberal Club		
1905–1908	Lincoln City	36	(10)
1908–19??	Worksop Town		
–	Merthyr Town		
- * Club domestic league appearances and goals

Frank Taylor (1887 – January 1928) was an English footballer who scored 10 goals from 36 appearances in the Football League playing for Lincoln City. He played as an outside left or at centre forward. He went on to play non-league football for Worksop Town and in the Southern League for Merthyr Town.
