= Munich air disaster =

1958 aviation accident in West Germany

Munich air disaster British European Airways Flight 609
- The burning wreckage of the aircraft

Accident
- Date: 6 February 1958
- Summary: Runway overrun due to slush on the runway
- Site: Munich-Riem Airport, Munich, West Germany; 48°07′34″N 11°40′40″E

Aircraft
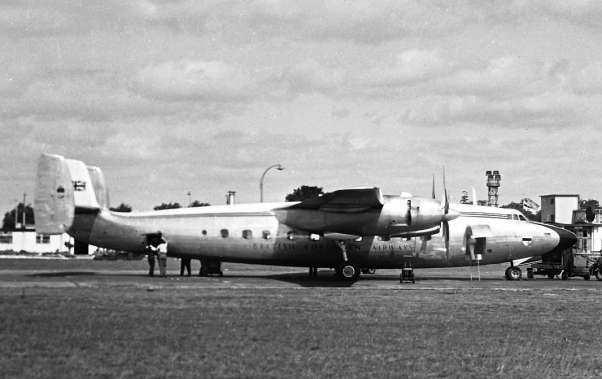
- G-ALZU, the aircraft involved in the accident, pictured in 1955
- Aircraft type: Airspeed AS-57 Ambassador
- Aircraft name: Lord Burghley
- Operator: British European Airways
- IATA flight No.: BE609
- ICAO flight No.: BEA609
- Call sign: BEALINE 609
- Registration: G-ALZU
- Flight origin: Belgrade Airport, Belgrade, SFR Yugoslavia
- Stopover: Munich-Riem Airport, Munich, West Germany
- Destination: Manchester Airport, Manchester, England
- Occupants: 44
- Passengers: 38
- Crew: 6
- Fatalities: 23
- Injuries: 19
- Survivors: 21

The Munich air disaster occurred on 6 February 1958, when British European Airways Flight 609 crashed on its third attempt to take off at Munich-Riem Airport in Munich, West Germany. The aircraft was carrying the Manchester United football team, nicknamed the "Busby Babes", along with supporters and journalists. There were 44 people on board, 20 of whom died at the scene. The injured, some unconscious, were taken to Munich's Rechts der Isar Hospital, where three more died, resulting in 23 fatalities, with 21 survivors.

The Manchester United team were returning from a European Cup match in Belgrade, Yugoslavia (now Serbia), having eliminated Red Star Belgrade to advance to the semi-finals of the competition. The flight stopped to refuel in Munich, because a non-stop flight from Belgrade to Manchester was beyond the range of the "Elizabethan"-class Airspeed Ambassador. After refuelling, pilots James Thain and Kenneth Rayment twice abandoned take-off because of boost surging in the left engine. Fearing they would fall too far behind schedule, Thain rejected an overnight stay in Munich in favour of a third take-off attempt. By that time, snow was falling, causing a layer of slush to form at the end of the runway. After hitting the slush, the aircraft ploughed through a fence beyond the end of the runway, and the left wing was ripped off when it struck a house. The tail section broke off and hit a barn with a parked fuel truck in it, which caught fire and exploded. Fearing the aircraft might explode, Thain began evacuating passengers, while goalkeeper Harry Gregg helped pull survivors from the wreckage.

An investigation by West German airport authorities originally blamed Thain, saying he did not de-ice the aircraft's wings, despite eyewitness statements indicating that de-icing was unnecessary. The last inquiry by the UK Board of Trade, released in 1969, found that the crash was caused by snow slush on the runway that slowed the plane too much to allow takeoff, and that Captain Thain was not to blame.

United were aiming to become the third club to win three successive Football League titles. They were six points behind league leaders Wolverhampton Wanderers, with 14 games still to play. They held the FA Charity Shield and had just advanced into their second successive European Cup semi-finals. The team had not been beaten for 11 matches. The crash not only derailed the team's title ambitions that year but also destroyed the nucleus of what promised to be one of the greatest generations of players in English football history. It took ten years for the club to recover after the tragedy. Busby, assisted by Murphy, rebuilt the team and won the European Cup in 1968 with a new generation of "Babes".

== Background ==
In April 1955, the Union of European Football Associations (UEFA) established the European Cup, a football competition for the champion clubs of UEFA-affiliated nations, the predecessor to the present-day UEFA Champions League, to begin in the 1955–56 season. The English league winners, Chelsea, were denied entry by the Football League's secretary, Alan Hardaker, who believed not participating was best for English football. The following season, the English league was won by Manchester United, managed by Matt Busby. The Football League again denied their champions entry, but Busby and his chairman, Harold Hardman, with the help of the Football Association's (FA) chairman Stanley Rous, defied the league and United became the first English team to play in Europe.

The team – known as the "Busby Babes" for their youth – reached the semi-finals, beaten there by the eventual winners, Real Madrid. Winning the First Division title again that season meant qualification for the 1957–58 tournament, and their semi-final run in 1956–57, meant they were one of the favourites to win. Domestic league matches were on Saturdays and European matches midweek, so, although air travel was risky, it was the only choice if United were to fulfil their league fixtures, which they would have to do if they were to avoid proving Hardaker right.

After overcoming Shamrock Rovers and Dukla Prague in the preliminary and first round respectively, United were drawn with Red Star Belgrade of Yugoslavia (now Serbia), for the quarter-finals. After beating them 2–1 at Old Trafford on 14 January 1958, the club was to travel to Yugoslavia for the return leg on 5 February. On the way back from Prague in the previous round, fog over England prevented the team from flying back to Manchester, so they flew to Amsterdam. They took the ferry from the Hook of Holland to Harwich, and then the train to Manchester. The trip took its toll on the players and they drew 3–3 with Birmingham City at St Andrew's three days later.

Eager not to miss Football League fixtures, and not to have a difficult trip again, the club chartered a British European Airways (BEA) plane from Manchester to Belgrade, for the away leg against Red Star. The match was drawn 3–3 but it was enough to send United to the semi-finals. The takeoff from Belgrade was delayed for an hour after outside right Johnny Berry lost his passport. The plane landed in Munich, West Germany, for refuelling at 13:15 GMT.

=== Aircraft and crew ===
The aircraft was a six-year-old Airspeed Ambassador 2, built in 1952 and delivered to BEA the same year.

The pilot, Captain James Thain, was a former flight lieutenant in the Royal Air Force (RAF). Originally a sergeant, later a warrant officer, he was given an emergency commission in the RAF as an acting pilot officer on probation in April 1944. He was promoted to pilot officer on probation in September 1944. He was promoted to flight lieutenant in May 1948, and received a permanent commission in the same rank in 1952. He retired from the RAF to join BEA.

The co-pilot, Captain Kenneth Rayment, was also a former RAF flight lieutenant and a Second World War flying ace. After joining the RAF in 1940, he was promoted to sergeant in September 1941. He was commissioned as a war substantive pilot officer a year later, and promoted to war substantive flying officer in May 1943. He shot down five German fighters, one Italian plane and a V-1 flying bomb. He was awarded the Distinguished Flying Cross in July 1943, and promoted to flight lieutenant in September 1943. After leaving the RAF in 1945, he joined British Overseas Airways Corporation in Cairo, before joining BEA in 1947. He had had experience with Vikings, Dakotas and the Ambassador "Elizabethan" class.

== Accident ==
Thain had flown the "Elizabethan"-class Airspeed Ambassador, registration G-ALZU, to Belgrade but handed the controls to Rayment for the return. At 14:19 GMT, the control tower at Munich was told the plane was ready to take off and gave clearance for take-off, expiring at 14:31. Rayment abandoned the take-off after Thain noticed the port boost pressure gauge fluctuating as the plane reached full power, and the engine sounded odd while accelerating. A second attempt was made three minutes later, but called off 40 seconds into the attempt because the engines were running on an overrich mixture, causing them to overaccelerate, a common problem for the "Elizabethan".

After the second failure, passengers retreated to the airport lounge. By then, it had started to snow heavily, and it looked unlikely that the plane would be making the return journey that day. Half-back Duncan Edwards sent a telegram to his landlady in Manchester, reading: "All flights cancelled, flying tomorrow. Duncan."

Thain told the station engineer, Bill Black, about the problem with the boost surging in the port engine. Black suggested that since opening the throttle more slowly had not worked, the only option was to hold the plane overnight for retuning. Thain was anxious to stay on schedule and suggested that opening the throttle even more slowly would suffice. This would mean that the plane would not achieve take-off velocity until further down the runway, but with the runway almost 2 kilometres (1.2 mi) long, he believed this would not be a problem. The passengers were called back to the plane 15 minutes after leaving it.

A few of the players were not confident fliers, particularly Billy Whelan, who said, "This may be death, but I'm ready". Others, including Edwards, Tommy Taylor, Mark Jones, Eddie Colman and journalist Frank Swift, moved to the back of the plane, believing it safer. Once everyone was on board, Thain and Rayment got the plane moving again at 14:56. At 14:59, they reached the runway holding point, where they received clearance to line up ready for take-off. On the runway, they made final cockpit checks. At 15:02, they were told their take-off clearance would expire at 15:04. The pilots agreed to attempt take-off, but that they would watch the instruments for surging in the engines. At 15:03, they told the control tower of their decision.

American newsreel footage reporting the crash

Rayment moved the throttle forward slowly and released the brakes. The plane began to accelerate, and radio officer Bill Rodgers radioed the control tower with the message "Zulu Uniform rolling". The plane threw up slush as it gathered speed, and Thain called out the plane's velocity in 10-knot increments. At 85 knots (157 km/h), the port engine began to surge again, and he pulled back marginally on the port throttle, before pushing it forward again.

Once the plane reached 117 knots (217 km/h), he announced "V1", at which it was no longer safe to abort take-off, and Rayment listened for the call of "V2" (119 knots (220 km/h)), the minimum required to get off the ground. Thain expected the speed to rise, but it fluctuated around 117 knots (217 km/h) before suddenly dropping to 112 knots (207 km/h), and then 105 knots (194 km/h). Rayment shouted, "Christ, we won't make it!", as Thain looked up to see what lay ahead.

The plane skidded off the end of the runway, crashed into the fence surrounding the airport, and across a road. Its port wing was torn off as it caught a house, home to a family of six. The father and eldest daughter were away, and the mother and the other three children escaped as the house caught fire. Part of the plane's tail was torn off, before the left side of the cockpit hit a tree. The right side of the fuselage hit a wooden hut, inside of which was a truck filled with tyres and fuel, which exploded.

On seeing flames around the cockpit, Thain feared that the aircraft would explode, and told his crew to evacuate the area. The stewardesses, Rosemary Cheverton and Margaret Bellis, were the first to leave through a blown-out emergency window in the galley, followed by radio officer Rodgers. Rayment was trapped in his seat by the crumpled fuselage and told Thain to go without him. Thain clambered out of the galley window. On reaching the ground, he saw flames growing under the starboard wing, which held 500 imperial gallons (2,300 L) of fuel. He shouted to his crew to get away and climbed back into the aircraft to retrieve two handheld fire extinguishers, stopping to tell Rayment he would be back when the fires had been dealt with.

Meanwhile, in the cabin, goalkeeper Harry Gregg was regaining consciousness, thinking that he was dead. He felt blood on his face and "didn't dare put [his] hand up. [He] thought the top of [his] head had been taken off, like a hard boiled egg." Just above him, light shone into the cabin, so Gregg kicked the hole wide enough for him to escape. He managed to save some passengers, among them teammates Bobby Charlton and Dennis Viollet, who were strapped into their seats away from the wreckage.

== Victims ==
Twenty passengers died at the scene, another died on his way to hospital, and two others died a few weeks later while in the hospital.

=== Fatalities ===
==== Crew members ====
- Kenneth Rayment. Co-pilot on this flight. Survived but suffered multiple injuries. Died in hospital 28 days later as a result of brain damage.
- Tommy Cable - Airline Steward

==== Passengers ====
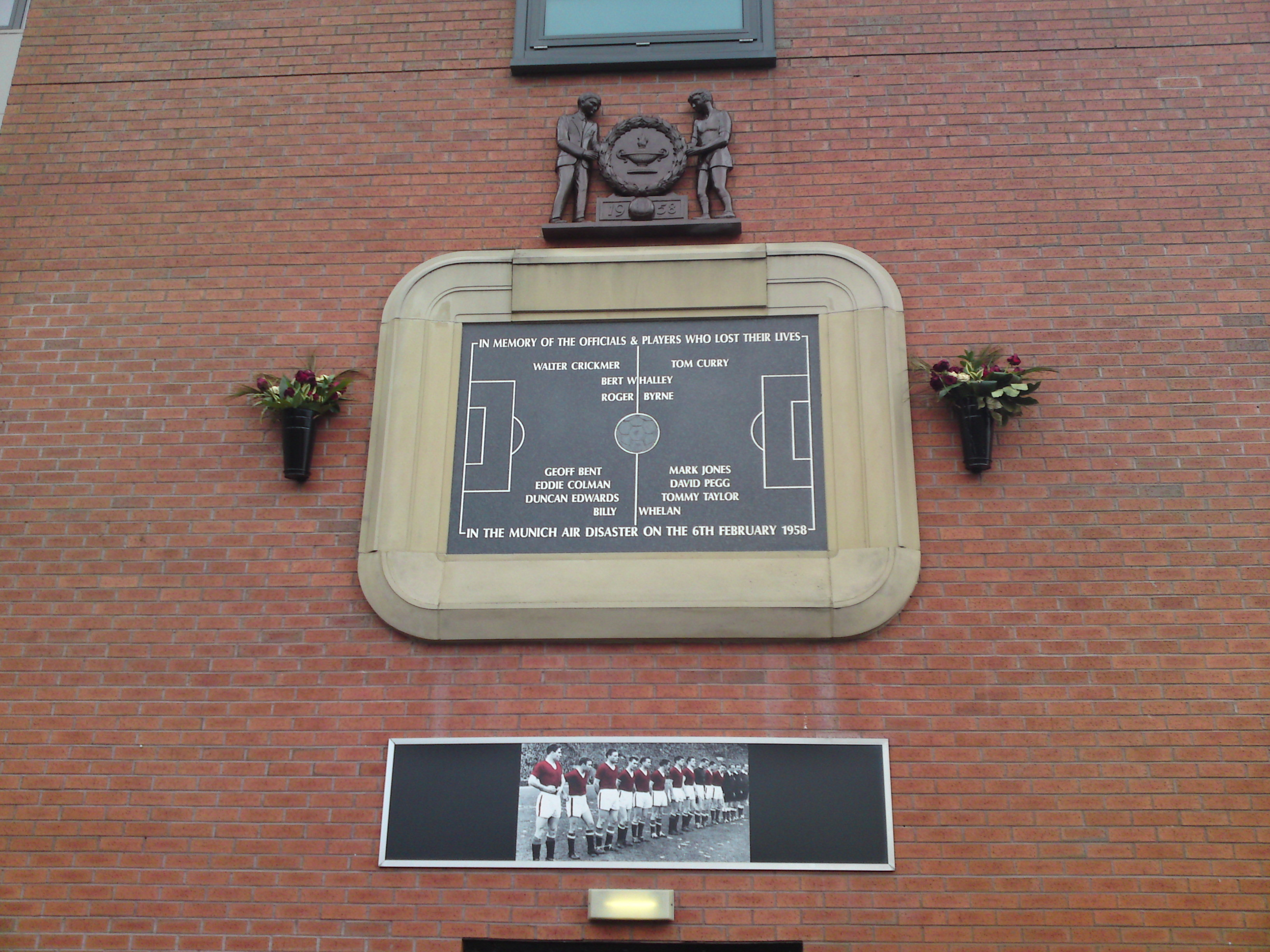
A plaque at Old Trafford in memory of the Munich air disaster

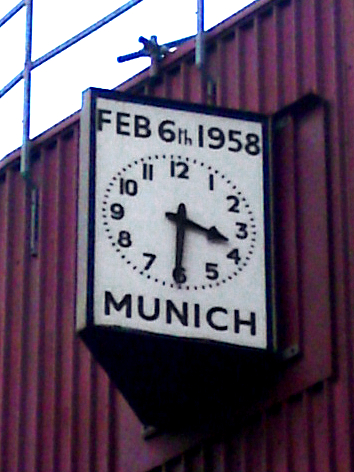
The Munich Clock, on the southeast corner of Old Trafford

Manchester United players

- Geoff Bent (Manchester United's left back)
- Roger Byrne (Manchester United's full back)
- Eddie Colman (Manchester United's wing-half)
- Duncan Edwards, survived the crash, but died in hospital 15 days later (Manchester United's young left-half prodigy)
- Mark Jones (Manchester United's centre-half)
- David Pegg (Manchester United's outside left)
- Tommy Taylor (Manchester United's centre-forward)
- Billy Whelan (Manchester United's inside forward)

Manchester United staff

- Walter Crickmer, Manchester United club secretary
- Tom Curry, trainer
- Bert Whalley, chief coach

Journalists

- Frank Swift, News of the World, also former England and Manchester City goalkeeper. Died on his way to hospital
- Donny Davies, retired footballer, who went on to write for the Manchester Guardian

=== Survivors ===
==== Crew ====
- James Thain, pilot, died 1975.

==== Passengers ====
Manchester United players

- Johnny Berry, never played again, died 1994.
- Jackie Blanchflower, never played again, died 1998.
- Bobby Charlton, died 2023.
- Bill Foulkes, died 2013.
- Harry Gregg, died 2020.
- Kenny Morgans, died 2012.
- Albert Scanlon, died 2009.
- Dennis Viollet, died 1999.
- Ray Wood, died 2002.

Manchester United staff

- Matt Busby, manager, died 1994.

Journalists and photographers

- Frank Taylor, News Chronicle reporter, died 2002.

== Investigation ==
The crash was originally blamed on pilot error, but it was later found to have been caused by slush towards the end of the runway, slowing the aircraft and preventing safe flying speed. During take-off, the aircraft had reached 117 knots (217 km/h), but, on entering the slush, dropped to 105 knots (194 km/h), too slow to leave the ground, and with not enough runway to abort the take-off. Aircraft with tail-wheel undercarriages had not been greatly affected by slush, due to the geometry of these undercarriages in relation to the aircraft's centre of gravity, (Note: Aircraft with tailwheel undercarriages have the main undercarriage – about which the aeroplane rotates on take-off – positioned ahead of the aircraft's centre of gravity, allowing the aircraft to be flown off by application of up-elevator should deceleration be applied to the mainwheels on take-off when close to flying speed. On aircraft with a nosewheel, the main wheels are positioned behind the centre of gravity, causing a nose-down moment (force) should undue drag occur at the mainwheels, even if the nosewheel is already off the ground. This nose-down force reduces the elevator authority and makes it more difficult to keep the nosewheel off the ground, whereas the tailwheel undercarriage aeroplane already has its tailwheel off the ground at this point, and applying up elevator will usually lower the tail sufficiently for the aircraft to lift-off. On the nosewheel-equipped aircraft, the additional drag of the nosewheel in the slush reduces speed even more, as once the mainwheels have entered slush and initiated a downward force on the nose, the aeroplane has three wheels in contact with the slush, rather than just two. The tailwheel-equipped aeroplane upon entering slush may be 'hauled off' at close to safe flying speed, whereas the nosewheel one may be prevented from reaching it, or have its speed reduced by the additional drag of the nosewheel. As the slush drag further slows the aeroplane, this can make it impossible to raise the nosewheel off the runway, so the aircraft is unable to rotate. On a tailwheeled aircraft, the slush drag force is usually insufficient to prevent rotation, providing sufficient airspeed is reached, whereas on a nosewheeled aeroplane, it may force the nosewheel back onto the runway, or, depending on the airspeed achieved, even prevent it from being raised at all. In the Munich case, the drag of the slush slowed the Ambassador – which had twin-wheeled nose and mainwheel undercarriage units – sufficiently to make take-off impossible, while insufficient runway remained for the aircraft to be stopped safely.) but newer types, such as the Ambassador, with nose wheel landing-gear and the main wheels behind the centre of gravity, were found to be vulnerable.

Despite this conclusion, German Federal Aviation Office ("Luftfahrt-Bundesamt") took legal action against Thain, as the one pilot who had survived the crash. They claimed he had taken off without clearing the wings of ice, which caused the crash, despite several witnesses stating that no ice had been seen. De-icing the aircraft was the captain's responsibility, while the state of the airport's runways was the responsibility of the airport authorities, among whom there was widespread ignorance of the danger of slush on runways for aircraft such as the Ambassador.

In 1969 Thain was cleared of any responsibility for the crash by a UK Board of Trade. As the cause, the Board of Trade recorded a build-up of melting snow on the runway, which prevented the plane from reaching the required take-off speed. Thain, having been dismissed by BEA on February 1961 and never re-engaged, retired and returned to run his poultry farm in Berkshire. He died of a heart attack at age 53, in August 1975.

== Aftermath ==
Twenty people, including seven of Manchester United's players, died at the scene of the crash. The 21st victim was Frank Swift, a journalist and former goalkeeper who played with Busby at Manchester City; he died on his way to hospital. Duncan Edwards died from his injuries on 21 February at the Rechts der Isar Hospital in Munich. The final death toll reached 23 several days later, when co-pilot Rayment died as a result of serious head injuries. Johnny Berry and Jackie Blanchflower were both injured so severely that they never played again.

Busby was seriously injured and had to stay in hospital for more than two months after the crash, and was given the Last Rites twice. After being discharged from hospital, he went to Switzerland to recuperate in Interlaken. At times, he felt like giving up football entirely, until he was told by his wife, Jean, "You know Matt, the lads would have wanted you to carry on." That statement lifted Busby from his depression, and he returned by land and sea to Manchester, before watching his team play in the 1958 FA Cup final.

Meanwhile, there was speculation that the club would fold, but a threadbare United team completed the 1957–58 season, with Busby's assistant Jimmy Murphy standing in as manager; he had not travelled to Belgrade as he was in Cardiff managing the Wales national team at the time. A team largely made up of reserve and youth team players beat Sheffield Wednesday 3–0 in the first match after the disaster. The programme for that match showed simply a blank space where each United player's name should have been. With seven players dead (Edwards died just over 24 hours later), and with only Gregg and Foulkes fit to play out of the surviving players, United were desperate to find replacements with experience, so Murphy signed Ernie Taylor from Blackpool and Stan Crowther from Aston Villa.

Three players, Derek Lewin, Bob Hardisty and Warren Bradley, were transferred to United on short-term contracts by non-League club Bishop Auckland. Bradley was the only one of the three players to play for the first team, and the only one to sign a permanent contract. The remaining places in the team were filled by reserve players including Shay Brennan and Mark Pearson. United's fierce rivals Liverpool offered them five loan players to help put a side together.

There were changes in the backroom staff at United too, following the deaths of secretary Walter Crickmer and coaches Tom Curry and Bert Whalley. Goalkeeper Les Olive, still registered as a player at the time of the disaster, retired from playing and took over from Crickmer as club secretary. Another former United goalkeeper, Jack Crompton, took over coaching duties after United chairman Harold Hardman had negotiated with Crompton's then-employers Luton Town for his release.

United only won one more league game in the 1957–58 season after the crash, causing their title challenge to collapse and they fell to ninth place. They managed to reach the FA Cup final, but lost 2–0 to Bolton Wanderers, and beat Milan at Old Trafford in the European Cup semi-finals, only to lose 4–0 at the San Siro. Real Madrid, who went on to win the trophy for the third year running, suggested that Manchester United be awarded the trophy for that year – a suggestion supported by Red Star Belgrade – but this failed to materialise. After the tragedy, UEFA floated the idea of Manchester City taking United's place in the European Cup, had United not been able to fulfil their fixtures, but this was rejected by all parties involved, City in particular.

Busby resumed managerial duties the following season. Real Madrid offered to loan Alfredo Di Stéfano until the end of the season for half his wages, but the transfer was blocked by the FA, as it would prevent a British player to take that spot in the team. Madrid instead raised funds and organized charity friendly matches with United. Eventually, Busby built a second generation of Busby Babes, including George Best and Denis Law, that ten years later won the European Cup by beating two-time winners Benfica. Charlton and Foulkes were the only two crash survivors who lined up in that team.

A fund for dependents of victims of the crash was established in March 1958, and chaired by the Chairman of the FA, Arthur Drewry. The fund raised £52,000 (equivalent to £1.06 million as of 2025) by the time of its disbursement in October 1958.

Manchester United announced on 8 January 1963 that legal action against BEA relating to the crash had been settled out of court. Club secretary Les Olive said the amount involved was not being disclosed. A BEA statement said: "A settlement has been made and an application will be made to the court on Friday, January 11, to stay proceedings."

== Memorials ==
=== Old Trafford ===
Commemorative plaque in the Munich Tunnel at Old Trafford

The first memorials at Old Trafford to the lost players and staff were unveiled on 25 February 1960. The first, a plaque in the shape of the stadium with the image of a green pitch, inscribed with the names of the victims in black and gold glass, was placed above the entrance to the directors' box. Above the plaque was a teak carving of a player and a supporter, heads bowed either side of a wreath and a football inscribed with the date "1958". The plaque was designed by Manchester architect J. Vipond and constructed by Messrs Jaconello (Manchester) Ltd. at a cost of £2,100, and unveiled by Matt Busby.

Also unveiled that day was a memorial to the members of the press who died at Munich, which consisted of a bronze plaque that named the eight lost journalists. It was unveiled by crash survivor Frank Taylor on behalf of the Football Writers' Association. The original plaque was stolen in the 1980s and replaced by a replica now behind the counter in the press entrance. The final memorial was the Munich clock, a simple two-faced clock paid for by the Ground Committee and attached to the southeast corner of the stadium, with the date "6 Feb 1958" at the top of both faces and "Munich" at the bottom. The clock has remained in the same position since it was first installed. The clock was unveiled on 25 February 1960 by Dan Marsden, the chairman of the Ground Committee.

When the stadium was renovated in the mid-1970s, the plaque had to be moved from the directors' entrance to allow the necessary changes. The plaque could not be removed without damaging it, so the old memorial was walled up within the Main Stand and a new memorial was made, simpler than the original, now consisting simply of a slate pitch with the names inscribed upon it, and installed in 1976.

A third version of the memorial, more like the original than the second in that it included the stands around the slate pitch and the figures above it, was installed in 1996, coinciding with the erection of the statue of Matt Busby, who had unveiled the original memorial. This third version was constructed by stonemasons Mather and Ellis from Trafford Park, and the second was put into storage. It is currently awaiting new display panels before being placed into the club museum's Munich display. The third plaque and the statue of Busby were originally on the north side of the East Stand, but the statue was moved to the front of the East Stand and the plaque to the south side of the stand after the stand's expansion in 2000.

=== Munich ===
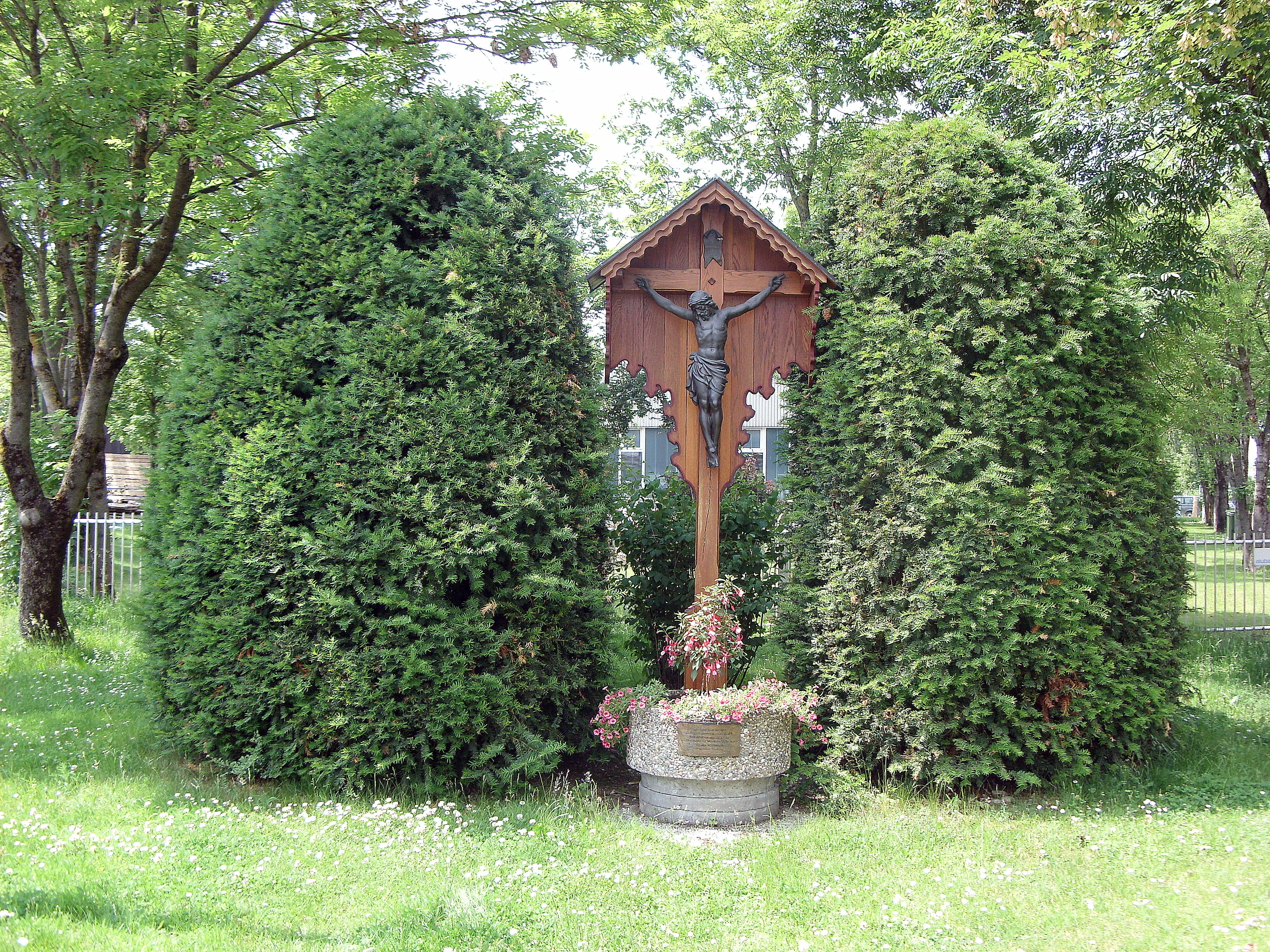
Memorial cross at the Emplstraße in Munich

There are also two memorials in Germany. First, in the Munich suburb of Trudering, on the corner of Karotschstraße and Emplstraße, there is a small wooden memorial depicting the Crucifixion, decorated by a stone trough filled with flowers. The trough bears a plaque with the inscription: "Im Gedenken an die Opfer der Flugzeugkatastrophe am 6.2.1958 unter denen sich auch ein Teil der Fußballmannschaft von Manchester United befand, sowie allen Verkehrstoten der Gemeinde Trudering" (In memory of the victims of the air disaster of 6 February 1958 including members of the football team of Manchester United as well as all the traffic victims from the municipality of Trudering).

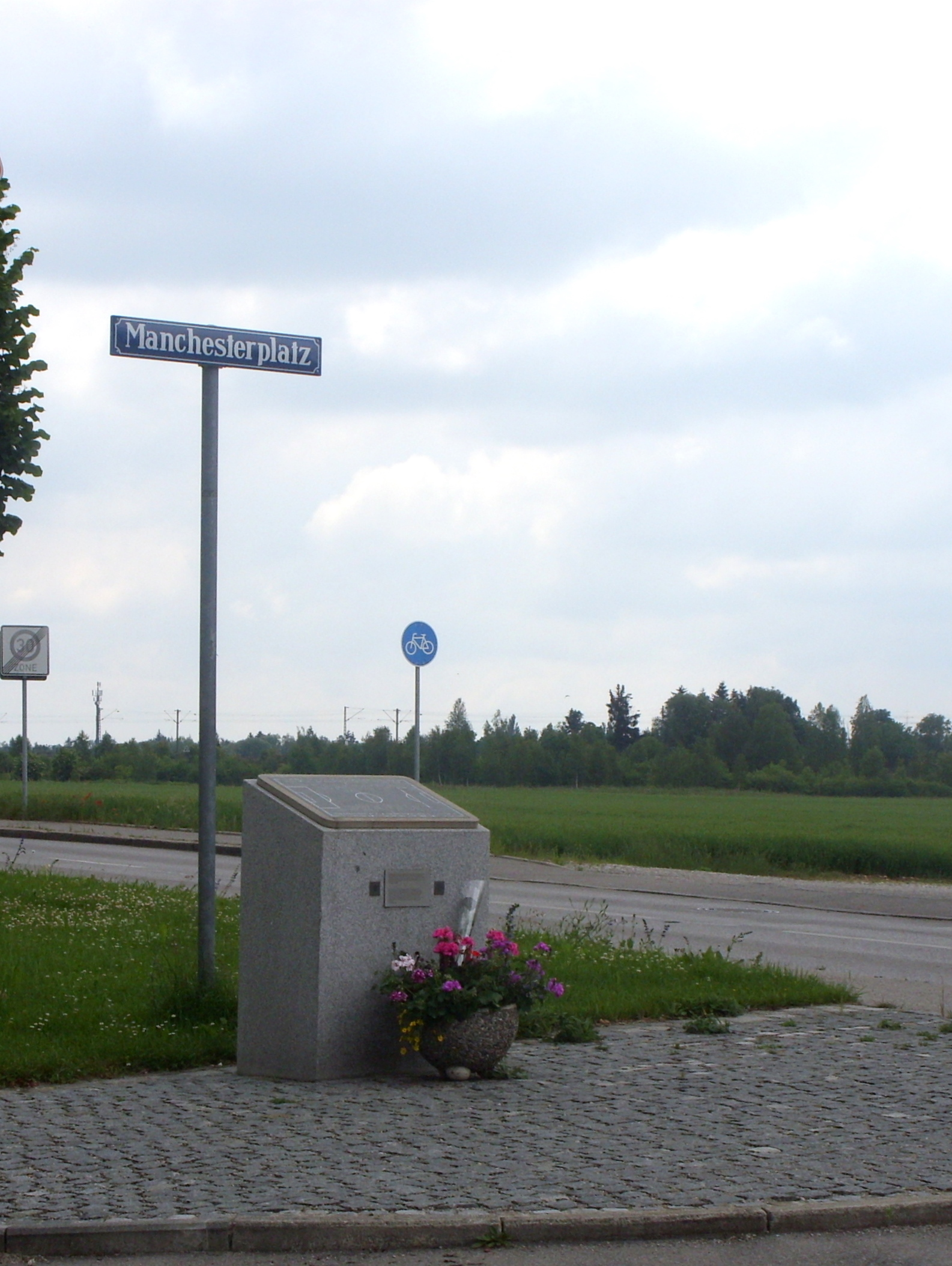
Memorial stone

On 22 September 2004, a dark blue granite plaque set in a sandstone border was unveiled in the vicinity of the old Munich Airport on the corner of Rappenweg and Emplstraße, just metres from the wooden memorial. With a design in the shape of a football pitch, it reads, in both English and German, "In memory of all those who lost their lives here in the Munich air disaster on 6 February 1958".

Underneath is a plaque expressing United's gratitude to the municipality of Munich and its people. The new memorial was funded by Manchester United themselves and the unveiling was attended by club officials, including chief executive David Gill, manager Alex Ferguson and director Bobby Charlton, a survivor of the disaster himself. On 24 April 2008, the Munich city council decided to name the site where the memorial stone is placed "Manchesterplatz" (Manchester Square). On 26 October 2026, a display cabinet installed in 2020 was broken into and looted by unknown persons.

On the 57th anniversary of the crash, 6 February 2015, Charlton and Bayern Munich chairman Karl-Heinz Rummenigge opened a new museum exhibit commemorating the disaster at the German club's stadium, the Allianz Arena.

=== Belgrade ===
There is a small display of artefacts at the Majestic Hotel, where the team stayed after the match. These include a menu card signed by 14 of the players, including the eight who were killed, a photograph taken at the meal and a match ticket. The menu card was acquired by the then-British ambassador to Yugoslavia and was auctioned by his son in 2006. Also at the hotel is the piano played by Manchester United's Mark Jones the night before the accident.

=== 40th anniversary ===
In late 1997, John Doherty (a former United player who had left the club shortly before the disaster) approached club chairman Martin Edwards on behalf of the Manchester United Former Players' Association to request a testimonial for those victims of the Munich disaster – both the survivors and the dependants of the ones who were lost. Edwards was hesitant, but a benefit match was eventually sanctioned for a date as close to the 40th anniversary of the disaster as possible. Red Star Belgrade and Bayern Munich were touted as possible opponents for the match, and fans purchased tickets without the opponents even having been decided.

In the midst of the preparations, former United player Eric Cantona, who had retired from football to pursue a career in film in 1997, expressed an interest in returning to the club for a farewell match. Edwards took the opportunity to combine the two events into one. Due to Cantona's acting career, his schedule meant that he would not be available in February 1998 and the match was moved to 18 August, with the opposition to be a European XI chosen by Cantona; the side selected by Cantona featured the likes of French internationals Laurent Blanc, Pascal Vahirua and Jean-Pierre Papin; England's Paul Gascoigne; former United players Bryan Robson and Mark Hughes; and Cantona's brother Joël. Cantona himself played the first half of the match for the European XI, before switching sides at half-time. United ultimately won the match 8–4, with goals from Ryan Giggs, Paul Scholes, Jordi Cruyff, Phil Neville, Nicky Butt, Alex Notman (2) and Cantona; while Papin, Blanc, Martin Dahlin and United player Mark Wilson were the scorers for the European XI.

Edwards was criticised for turning the match into a publicity stunt, while Elizabeth Wood, the divorced wife of survivor Ray Wood, compared the treatment of the Munich victims to that of "dancing bears at the circus". Nevertheless, the match earned £47,000 for each of the victims' families, while Cantona recouped over £90,000 in expenses directly from the testimonial fund, rather than from the club. The club also received criticism from some quarters for its poor treatment of the survivors: Berry and Blanchflower were forced to leave the flats they rented from the club to make way for new players. Berry was also notified by post that his employment with the club had been terminated. Another survivor, Ray Wood, complained about the lack of recognition from the club: "We feel that we helped to build Manchester United... They received massive international support following the disaster but they didn't treat people properly then, did nothing for us all those years, and they're still making money out of it directly now."

On 7 February 1998, United played Bolton Wanderers at Old Trafford in the Premier League a day after the 40th anniversary of the disaster. The match kicked off at 3:15 p.m. to allow a minute's silence to be observed at 3:04 p.m. Representatives from both teams laid floral tributes to those who died, with crash survivor and United director Bobby Charlton joined by Bolton president Nat Lofthouse in leading out the two teams.

=== 50th anniversary ===
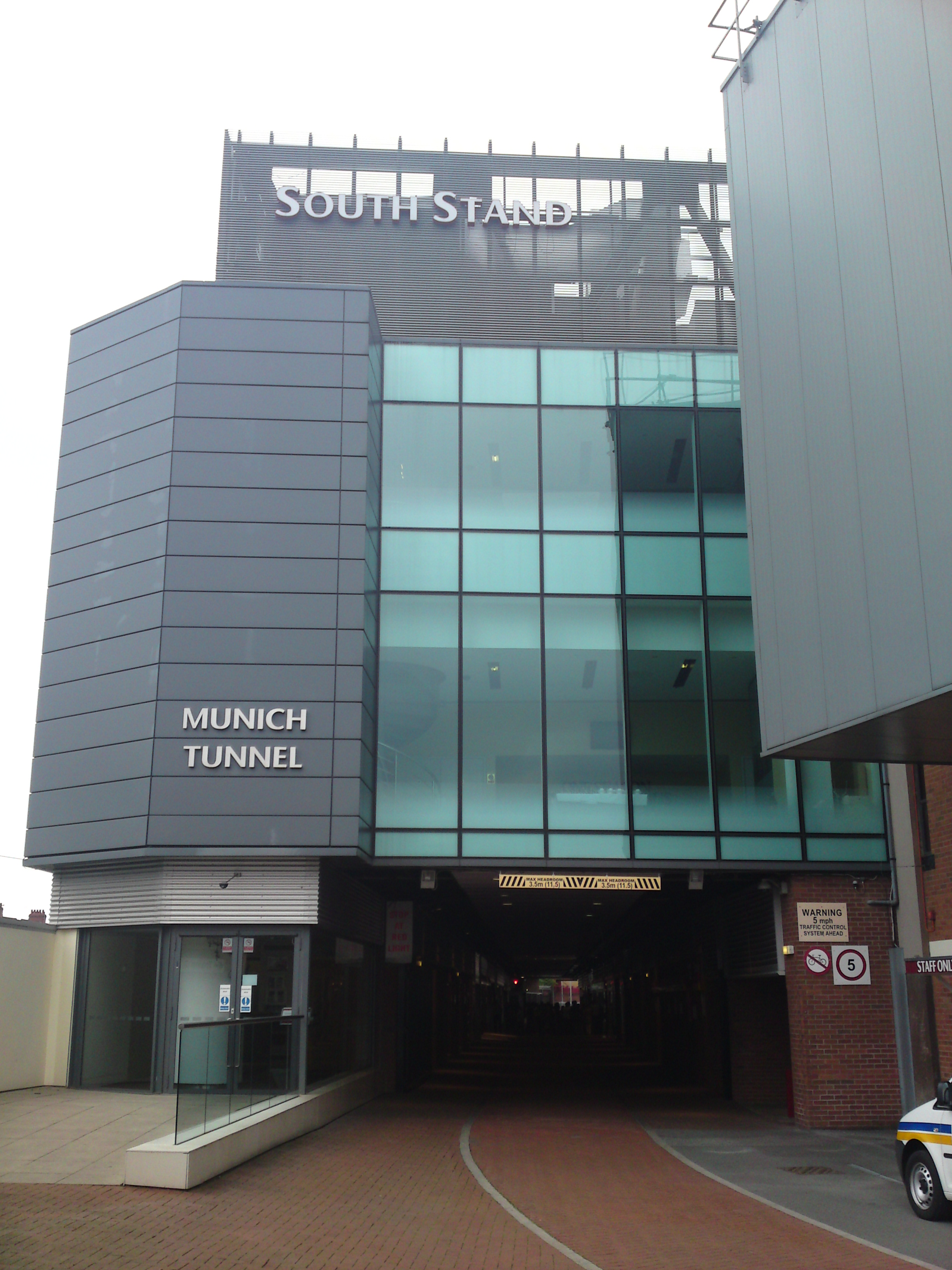
Old Trafford's Munich Tunnel, renamed on the 50th anniversary of the disaster

A memorial service was held at Old Trafford on 6 February 2008 to mark the 50th anniversary of the disaster. At the conclusion of the service, the surviving members of the 1958 team were the guests of honour at a ceremony to rename the tunnel under the stadium's South Stand as the "Munich Tunnel", which features an exhibition about the Busby Babes. A memorial billboard was unveiled outside Old Trafford, but it was criticized by some fans for including the logo of club's then-sponsor, American insurance firm AIG. The poster was later vandalised with paint bombs.

On the same day, the England national football team took on Switzerland at Wembley Stadium. Before the game, pictures of the players who lost their lives at Munich were displayed on big screens, and the England players wore black armbands. There was also a tribute to the Busby Babes in the match programme. Originally, there was no plan to observe a minute's silence on the day, because the FA feared that the silence would not be respected by fans of United's rivals. They eventually agreed that a moment of silence should be held and, in the event, it was generally well-observed; however, a small number of supporters made whistles and cat-calls and the referee cut the silence short after less than 30 seconds. One-minute silences were also observed at the Northern Ireland, Wales and the Republic of Ireland games.

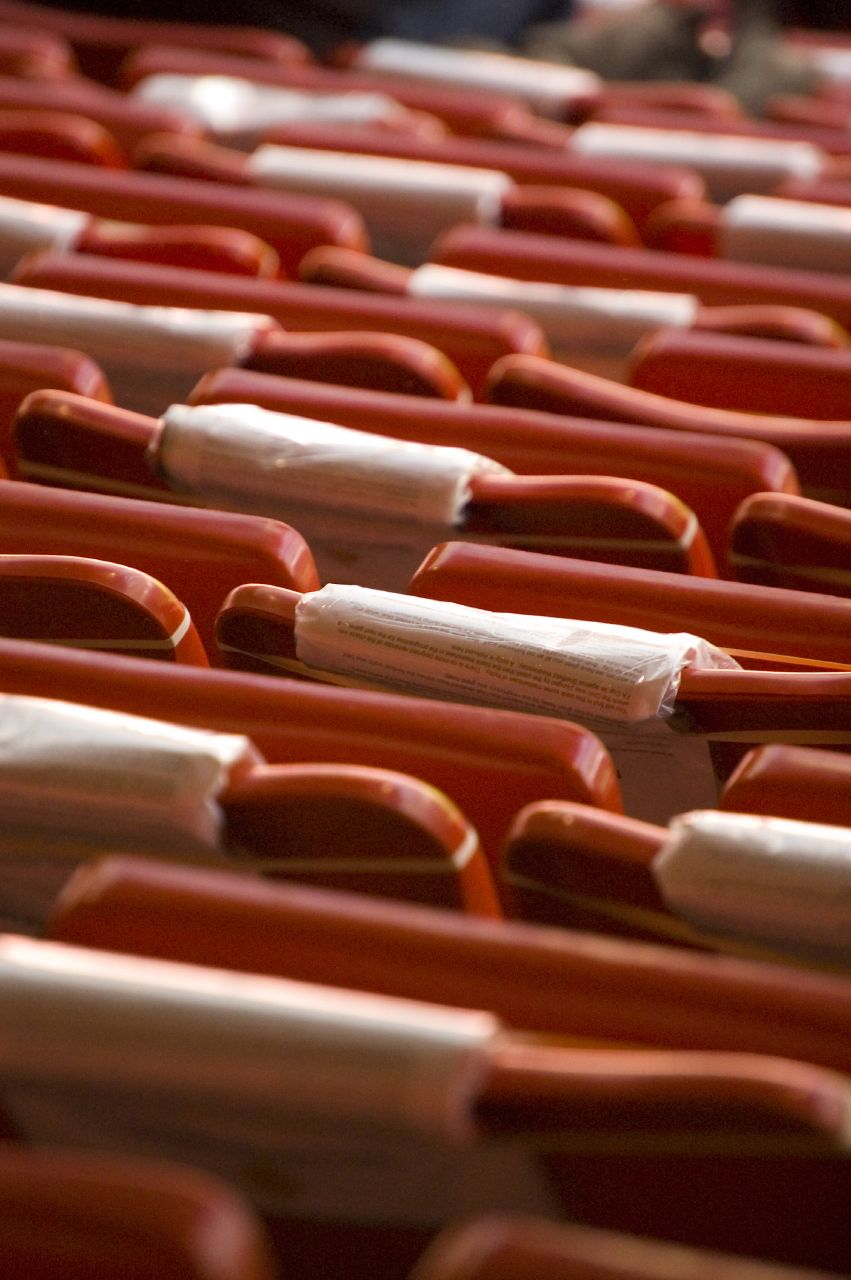
Commemorative scarves laid out on the backs of seats before the 50th anniversary match at Old Trafford

At the derby match between United and City at Old Trafford on 10 February 2008, both teams were led onto the pitch by a lone piper playing "The Red Flag", and the managers – Alex Ferguson and Sven-Göran Eriksson – each laid a wreath in the centre circle. This was followed by a minute's silence, which, despite previous concerns, was respected by all the fans. Kevin Parker, secretary of City's supporters club, had suggested a minute of applause instead of a minute's silence, so as to drown out anyone who would disrupt the silence, but this was rejected by the United management as inappropriate.

United played in strips reminiscent of those worn by the 1958 team, numbered 1 to 11, with no advertising on the front or players' names on the back, while City removed sponsors' logos from their kit and the image of a small black ribbon was heat pressed onto the right shoulder. Both teams wore black armbands in tribute to the victims of the Munich disaster. Manchester City won 2–1 thanks to first-half goals from Darius Vassell and debutant Benjani. Fans in attendance were given commemorative scarves – in red and white for the United fans, and sky blue and white for the City fans – which were held up during the silence.

== Tributes ==
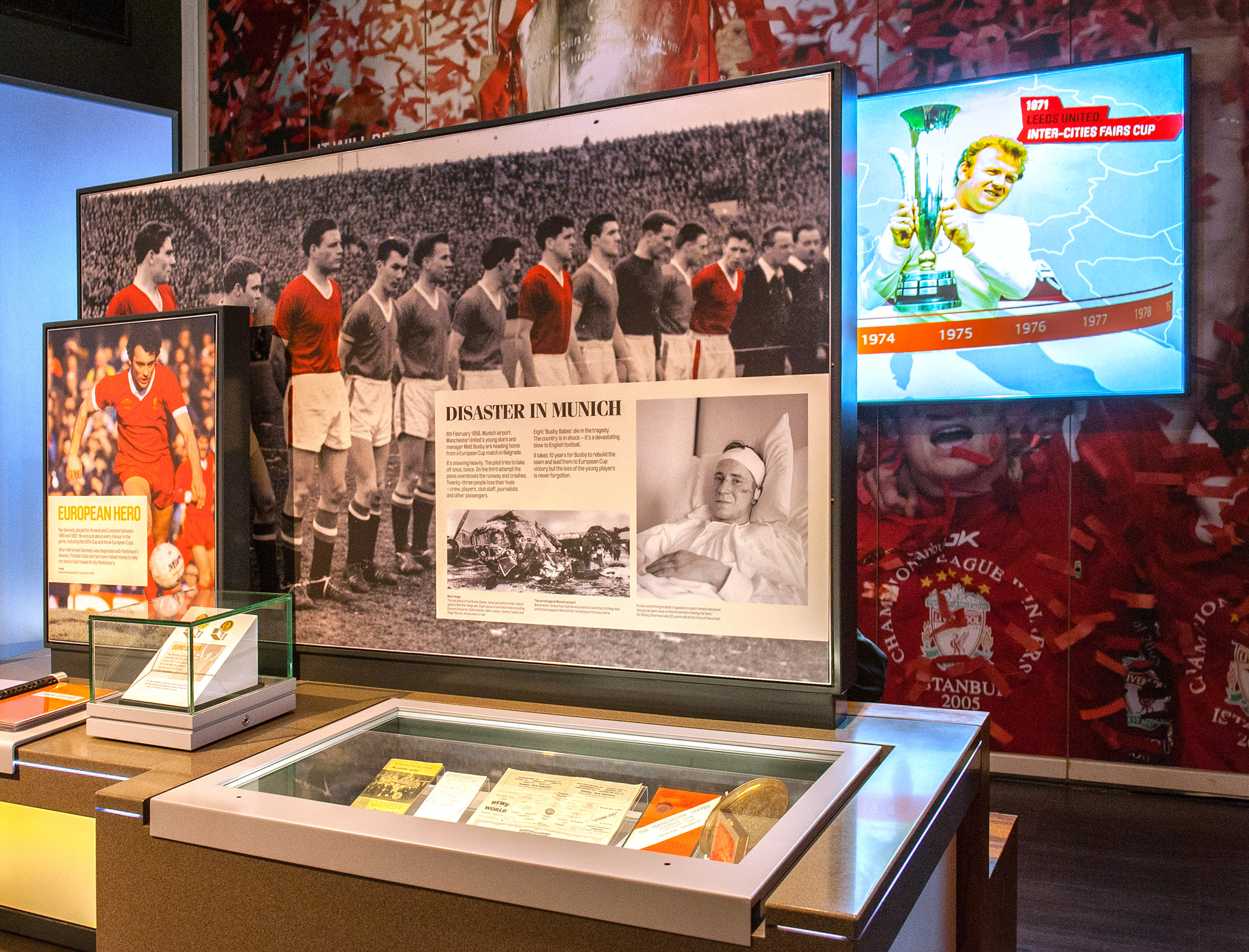
Display at the National Football Museum

=== Music ===
Several musical tributes to the Munich air disaster have been recorded, the earliest being the song "The Flowers of Manchester". Written by an anonymous author, later revealed to be Eric Winter, the editor of the magazine Sing, the song was recorded and released by Liverpool folk band The Spinners on their 1962 debut album Quayside Songs Old and New. Manchester-born singer Morrissey also released a song called "Munich Air Disaster, 1958" as a B-side to "Irish Blood, English Heart" in 2004. It later appeared on his live album, Live at Earls Court, in 2005 and his 2009 B-sides compilation, Swords.

Most recently, the English band The Futureheads named their album News and Tributes in honour of the disaster. The title track pays tribute to those who lost their lives, and includes the verse:

Cut down in their prime,
In silence, on that day,
February 58, they got what they need,
From Belgrade and back home to sleep

=== Film ===
Barry Navidi, producer of the 2004 film The Merchant of Venice, was reported to be working on a script for a Hollywood film about the Munich air crash. The Manchester Evening News reported on 22 April 2005 that the survivors had not been consulted and were concerned about how accurate the film would be.

Foulkes said that, if done right, the film could become a "tribute to the Busby Babes which could be seen for generations to come"; however, he expressed concerns about the accuracy of the film, given the filmmakers' lack of first-hand sources about what actually happened in Munich. Fellow survivor Harry Gregg was more concerned about the portrayal of the players, particularly those who died, and whether their families' feelings would be respected. John Doherty, a player who had left United only a few months before the crash, was less restrained, saying that "the only reason anyone would want to make a film like this is to make money" and that "while there may be a slight hint of truth in the film, it will be mainly untruths... Unless you were there, how could you know what conversations took place?".

=== Television ===
On 10 January 2006, the BBC showed a drama/documentary retelling the story in the series Surviving Disaster. The programme was met with criticism from former United winger Albert Scanlon, who claimed that it was full of inaccuracies, despite the production having consulted him about the content of the documentary. Errors in the programme included the depiction of Jimmy Murphy giving a pre-match team talk in Belgrade, despite him being in Cardiff at the time, and the plane being shown as only half full when nearly every seat was occupied.

On 6 February 2008, the 50th anniversary of the crash, several television channels showed programmes about it:

- UKTV History aired the BBC co-produced drama documentary Surviving Disaster to mark the 50th anniversary of the tragedy.
- MUTV aired a segmented documentary called Munich Remembered, aired throughout the day with memories of players, staff and supporters.
- The BBC showed as part of its One Life series a documentary following United goalkeeper Harry Gregg retracing his route from England to Belgrade to Munich. He met and talked with some of the first rescuers who had arrived on the scene. He also met Vera Lukić, the pregnant mother whom he had rescued and Zoran, the son she bore two months later.

Since the anniversary, two television programmes have been made about the disaster:

- A 2011 made-for-television film United, written by Chris Chibnall and directed by James Strong for the BBC, tells the story of the crash and the subsequent rebuilding of Manchester United as a footballing force. The story was seen largely through the eyes of coach Jimmy Murphy, who became de facto manager of the team while Busby recovered from the crash. The role of Murphy was played by David Tennant. The film gained generally good reviews, especially for its evocation of the period and for Tennant's acting, and was nominated at the Prix Europa 2011 Awards as "Best European TV Production". It was, however, condemned by Sandy Busby, the son of Matt Busby, who said he thought the film was "very poorly done", and strongly criticised the film's portrayal of his father.
- The Canadian TV series Mayday / Air Crash Investigation covered the crash in episode 77 (season 11, #5), first broadcast in December 2011. The episode covers the background of the flight, then investigates what caused the fatal crash.

=== Literature ===
The story of the disaster was fictionalised in Munichs (2024), by David Peace. The novel covers the disaster and its aftermath, ending with Manchester United’s defeat in the 1958 FA Cup Final. The title alludes to the use of the word "Munichs" as a term of abuse towards Manchester United supporters, which the author believes should be "reclaimed and worn as a badge of pride".

=== Other ===
The University of Salford honoured Munich victim Eddie Colman by naming one of its halls of residence after him. Colman was born in Salford in 1936. There is a network of small roads in Newton Heath named after the players who lost their lives in Munich, including Roger Byrne Close, David Pegg Walk, Geoff Bent Walk, Eddie Colman Close, Billy Whelan Walk, Tommy Taylor Close and Mark Jones Walk. Among those roads is an old people's home named after Duncan Edwards.

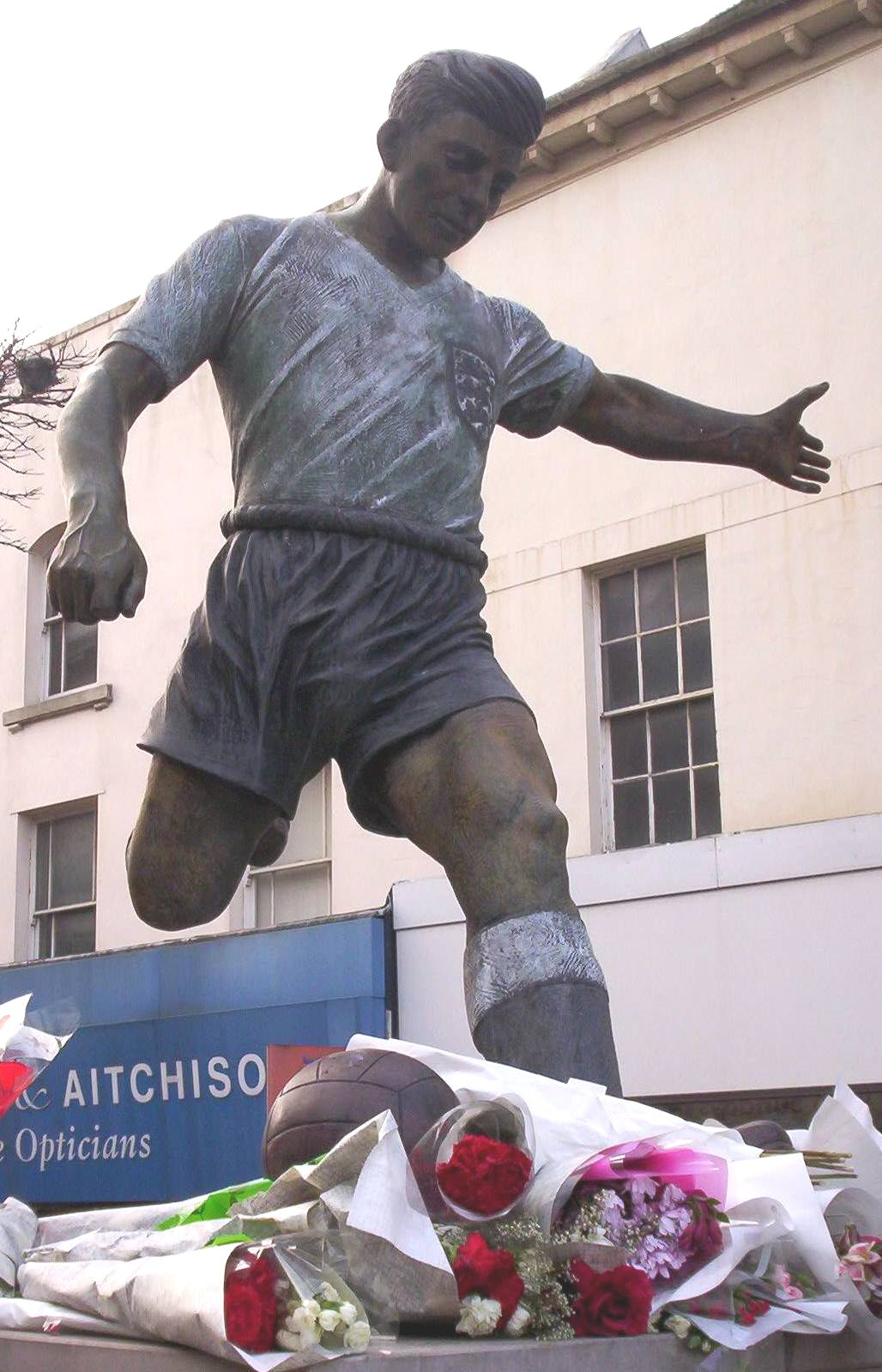
Statue of Edwards in the centre of his home town of Dudley

Edwards was honoured with street names in his home town of Dudley. There is a small close off Stourbridge Road named Duncan Edwards Close. A stained-glass window depicting Edwards, designed by Francis Skeat and paid for with donations from Football League clubs Brentford and Crystal Palace, was unveiled in St Francis's Church, the parish church of Dudley's Priory Estate, by Matt Busby in 1961, and a statue of Edwards unveiled in the centre of the town in October 1999 by his mother and his former team-mate Charlton. In 2008, the Dudley Southern Bypass was renamed Duncan Edwards Way. In 1996, Edwards was one of five deceased players chosen to appear on British stamps issued as part of a "Football Legends" set issued to commemorate the UEFA Euro 1996 tournament, which England was hosting.

The road bridge over the Luas tram line at Fassaugh Road, Cabra, Dublin 7 is named after Billy Whelan.

== See also ==
- History of Manchester United F.C. (1945–1969)
- List of accidents involving sports teams

== Bibliography ==
- Barnes, Justyn; Bostock, Adam; Butler, Cliff; Ferguson, Jim; Meek, David; Mitten, Andy; Pilger, Sam; Taylor, Frank OBE; Tyrrell, Tom (2001). The Official Manchester United Illustrated Encyclopedia. London: Manchester United Books. ISBN 0-233-99964-7.
- Connor, Jeff (2007). The Lost Babes. London: HarperSport. ISBN 978-0-00-720808-1.
- Crick, Michael; Smith, David (1990). Manchester United – The Betrayal of a Legend. London: Pan Books. ISBN 0-330-31440-8.
- Hall, David (2008). Manchester's Finest. London: Bantam Press. ISBN 978-0-593-05922-7.
- Middleton, Don (April 1982). "Airspeed's elegant Ambassador – Part 3". Aeroplane Monthly.
- Morrin, Stephen R. (2007). The Munich Air Disaster. Dublin: Gill & Macmillan. ISBN 978-0-7171-4110-4.
- Stewart, Stanley (1987). Air Disasters. London: Guild Publishing. ISBN 0-09-956200-6.
- White, Jim (2008). Manchester United: The Biography. London: Sphere. ISBN 978-1-84744-088-4.
- White, John (2007). The United Miscellany. London: Carlton Books. ISBN 978-1-84442-745-1.
