= List of people with surname Jenkins =

This is a list of people and fictional characters surnamed Jenkins.

== People ==
=== A ===
- Ab Jenkins (1883–1956), American racing car driver
- Al Jenkins (disambiguation)
- Alan Jenkins (engineer) (born 1947), English automotive engineer and designer
- Alan Jenkins (poet) (born 1955), English poet
- Albert Jenkins (footballer) (1865−1940), English footballer who formed Doncaster Rovers in 1879
- Albert Jenkins (rugby union) (1895–1953), Welsh international rugby union player
- Albert G. Jenkins (1830–1864), American soldier and politician
- Allan Jenkins (footballer) (born 1981), Scottish footballer
- Allen Jenkins (1900–1974), American actor and singer
- Andrew Jenkins (songwriter) (1885–1957), American country, folk and gospel songs composer
- Austin Jenkins (born 1989), American professional wrestler better known as Adam Cole

=== B ===
- Barbara Jenkins, Trinidadian writer
- Bert Jenkins (1885–1943), Welsh rugby league and rugby union footballer
- Bill Jenkins (drag racer) (1930–2012), American drag racer
- Bill Jenkins (politician) (born 1936), American politician
- Bill Jenkins (Royal Marines officer) (1925–2002), youngest Royal Marine to win a DSO in the Second World War
- Bill Jenkins, American voice actor for FUNimation Entertainment
- Bill Jenkings (1915–1996), Australian writer, newspaper reporter and Bondi Beach identity
- Billy Jenkins (disambiguation)
- Blanche Jenkins (active 1872–1915), British portrait painter
- Bob Jenkins (1947–2021), American television and radio sports announcer
- Bob Jenkins (American football) (1923–2001), American football halfback
- Bobo Jenkins (1916–1984), American blues guitarist, singer and songwriter
- Brian Jenkins (disambiguation)
- Bryan Jenkins, Australian environmental planner

=== C ===
- Carlos Jenkins (born 1968), American footballer
- Carol Jenkins (1947–1968), African-American murder victim
- Carter Jenkins (born 1991), American actor
- Charles Jenkins (disambiguation)
- Chase Jenkins (born 2004), American football player
- Chris Jenkins (disambiguation)
- Christopher Martin-Jenkins (1945–2013), cricket journalist
- Clay Jenkins (born 1964), American lawyer and politician
- Clive Jenkins (1926–1999), British trade unionist
- Constance Jenkins Macky (1883–1961), née Constance Jenkins, Australian-born American artist and teacher
- Cullen Jenkins (born 1981), American footballer
- Cynthia Jenkins (1924–2001), New York politician

=== D ===
- Dan Jenkins (1928–2019), American author and journalist
- Daniel H. Jenkins (born 1963), American actor

=== E ===
- Ebenezer Evans Jenkins (1820–1905), Wesleyan minister in India
- Ed Jenkins (American football) (born 1950), American lawyer and former footballer
- Ed Jenkins (rugby union) (born 1986), Australian rugby union player
- Ed Jenkins (U.S. politician) (1933–2012), Edgar Jenkins, U.S. Representative from Georgia
- Edward Jenkins (disambiguation)
- E. J. Jenkins (born 1998), American football player
- Elgton Jenkins (born 1995), American football player
- Ellis Jenkins (born 1993), Welsh rugby union footballer
- Ella Jenkins (1924–2024), American folk singer
- Ernie Jenkins (1880–1958), Wales international rugby union player
- Ernie Jenkins (baseball) (1906–1978), American baseball pitcher and manager
- Evan Jenkins (footballer) (1906–1990), Welsh football winger
- Evan Jenkins (politician) (born 1960), United States politician from West Virginia
- Evan Meredith Jenkins (1896–1985), British colonial administrator
- Eveline Annie Jenkins (1893–1976), British artist and illustrator

=== F ===
- Farish Jenkins (1940–2012), American paleontologist
- Ferguson Jenkins (born 1943), Canadian baseball player
- Florence Foster Jenkins (1868–1944), U.S. "soprano" known for her extraordinary bravery on stage
- Frances C. Jenkins (1826–1915), U.S. evangelist, Quaker minister, and social reformer

=== G ===
- G. Kenneth Jenkins (1918–2005), British numismatist
- Geoffrey Jenkins (1920–2001), South African writer
- George Jenkins (disambiguation)
- Geraint H. Jenkins (1946–2025), historian of Wales and the Welsh language
- Gethin Jenkins (born 1980), Welsh rugby player and coach
- Gordon Jenkins (1910–1984), American musician
- Graeme Jenkins (born 1958), British conductor
- Gus Jenkins (1931–1985), American blues pianist and singer
- Gwilym Jenkins (1932–1982), Welsh statistician

=== H ===
- Harold Jenkins (disambiguation)
- Harry Jenkins (disambiguation)
- Helen Jenkins (born 1984), British triathlete
- Henry Jenkins (disambiguation)
- Herbert George Jenkins (1876–1923), British writer and owner of publisher Herbert Jenkins Ltd
- Holman W. Jenkins Jr., Wall Street Journal editorial writer
- Horace Jenkins (born 1974), American basketball player
- Howard Jenkins (born 1952/3), American businessman
- Hugh Jenkins, Baron Jenkins of Putney (1908–2004), British Labour Party politician

=== I ===
- Ian Jenkins (disambiguation)
- Iain Jenkins (born 1972), former Northern Ireland footballer

=== J ===
- J. Geraint Jenkins (1929–2009), Welsh maritime historian and historian of rural crafts
- Jack Jenkins (disambiguation)
- Jackie 'Butch' Jenkins (1937–2001), American actor
- Jackie Jenkins-Scott (born c. 1950), American business and academic administrator
- James Jenkins (disambiguation)
- Jaray Jenkins (born 2000), American football player
- Jay Jenkins (born 1977), professionally known as Jeezy (formerly Young Jeezy), American rapper
- Jean Jenkins (ethnomusicologist) (1922–1990), American-born ethnomusicologist
- Jean Jenkins (politician) (born 1938), Australian educator and senator for Western Australia
- Jerry B. Jenkins (born 1949), American author
- Jim Jenkins (footballer) (1897–1983), Australian rules footballer
- Joe Jenkins (disambiguation)
- John Jenkins (disambiguation)
- Johnny Jenkins (1939–2006), American blues guitarist
- Johnny Jenkins (1939–2006), American blues guitarist
- Joseph Jenkins (disambiguation)
- Josh Jenkins (born 1989), Australian rules football player

=== K ===
- Karl Jenkins (born 1944), Welsh musician and composer
- Katherine Jenkins (born 1980), Welsh mezzo-soprano
- Kathryn Jenkins (1961–2009), Welsh hymn writer and scholar
- Keith Jenkins, English postmodern historian
- Ken Jenkins (born 1940), American actor
- Ken Jenkins (American football) (born 1959), American footballer
- Kenny Jenkins (1945–2009), Scottish footballer
- Keonta Jenkins (born 2002), American football player
- Kris Jenkins (born 1979), American footballer
- Kydran Jenkins (born 2002), American football player

=== L ===
- Larry "Flash" Jenkins (1955–2019), American actor, producer, director, and screenwriter
- Lauren Jenkins (born 1991), American singer-songwriter, actress, and director
- Lawrence L. Jenkins (1924–2017), American World War II pilot and prisoner of war
- Leoline Jenkins (1625–1685), Welsh lawyer and diplomat
- Leon Jenkins (born 1950), American football player
- Leroy Jenkins (jazz musician) (1932–2007), American composer and jazz musician
- Leroy Jenkins (televangelist) (1934–2017), American televangelist
- Lew Jenkins (1916–1981), American boxer
- Louis Jenkins (poet) (1942–2019), American poet
- Louis Jenkins (politician) (1860–1939), Canadian politician
- Louise Freeland Jenkins (1888–1970), American astronomer
- Luwanda Jenkins (born 1962), American politician

=== M ===
- Marilyn Jenkins (1937–2020), All-American Girls Professional Baseball League player
- Michael Jenkins (disambiguation)
- Mick Jenkins (rapper), American rapper
- Mick Jenkins (rugby), Welsh rugby footballer
- Mikaela Jenkins (born 2003), American Paralympic swimmer
- Mike Jenkins (American football) (born 1985), American footballer
- Mike Jenkins (poet) (born 1953), Welsh poet and fiction writer
- Mike Jenkins (strongman) (1982–2013), professional strongman competitor
- Minnie Braithwaite Jenkins (1874–1954), American school teacher

=== N ===
- Nathan Jenkins, British songwriter and record producer
- Neil Jenkins, Welsh rugby union footballer and coach
- Neil Jenkins (footballer) English soccer player
- Newell Sill Jenkins, American dentist and developer
- Nikara Jenkins (born 1997), Welsh rhythmic gymnast
- Niki Jenkins (born 1973), Canadian judoka
- Nikko Jenkins (born 1986), American spree killer
- Noam Jenkins, Canadian actor

=== O ===
- Oliver Peebles Jenkins (1850–1935), American physiologist and histologist, mainly associated with Stanford University

=== P ===
- Patrick Jenkins (American football) (born 2003), American football player
- Patty Jenkins, American film director and screenwriter
- Paul Jenkins (disambiguation), multiple people
- Peter Jenkins (journalist) (1934–1992), British journalist
- Philip Jenkins (born 1952), American history professor

=== R ===
- Rayshawn Jenkins (born 1994), American football player
- Richard Jenkins (disambiguation)
- Richard Jenkyns (1782–1854), British academic administrator and Dean of Wells
- Robert Jenkins (disambiguation)
- Rodney Jenkins (1944–2024), American equestrian
- Roy Jenkins, Baron Jenkins of Hillhead (1920–2003), British politician

=== S ===
- Sacha Jenkins (1971–2025), American hip-hop journalist
- Sally Jenkins (born 1960), American author and sports journalist
- Samuel Jenkins, Jr. (born 1956), African-American politician
- Scoville Jenkins (born 1986), American tennis player
- Simon Jenkins (born 1943), British newspaper columnist
- Speight Jenkins (born 1937), American music critic and opera general director
- Stephan Jenkins (born 1964), rock singer
- Stephan Jenkins (inmate) (died 2020), Belizean prisoner

=== T ===
- Terry Jenkins (born 1963), professional darts player
- Teven Jenkins (born 1998), American football player
- Thomas Jenkins (disambiguation)
- Thornton A. Jenkins (1811–1893), United States rear admiral
- Tom Jenkins (disambiguation)
- Tommy Jenkins (born 1947), English footballer
- Tommy Jenkins (Australian footballer) (1902–1979)
- Trefor Jenkins (1932–2025), South African human geneticist

=== W ===
- Walter Jenkins (1918–1985), top aide to Lyndon B. Johnson, resigned after a scandal
- Walter Jenkins (civil servant) (1874–1951), British admiralty official
- William Jenkins (disambiguation)
- Woody Jenkins (born 1947), American journalist and politician

=== V ===
- Victoria Jenkins, British adaptive fashion designer and disability activist

== Fictional characters ==
- Abner Jenkins (Beetle, MACH-1, etc.), a Marvel Comics supervillain-turned-hero
- Al Jenkins (EastEnders), in the BBC soap opera EastEnders, played by Adam Croasdell
- Anya Jenkins, in the television series Buffy the Vampire Slayer
- Billie Jenkins, in the television series Charmed
- Bruno Jenkins, in the BBC medical drama Casualty
- Carl Jenkins (Starship Troopers), in the film Starship Troopers
- Carl Jenkins (Oz), an inmate of the Aryan Brotherhood on the HBO drama Oz
- Christy Jenkins, in the television series Charmed
- Leeroy Jenkins, a player character and internet phenomenon from World of Warcraft
- Paul Jenkins (EastEnders), in the BBC soap opera EastEnders
- Peter "Tucker" Jenkins, in the BBC children's programme Grange Hill, portrayed by Todd Carty

== See also ==
- Jenkins (name)
- Jenkin
- Jenkyns
- Little John
