= John Jenkins =

John Jenkins may refer to:

== Politicians ==
- John Jenkins (governor) (died 1681), colonial governor of North Carolina
- John Theophilus Jenkins (1829–1919), Canadian physician and political figure in Prince Edward Island.
- John Jones Jenkins, 1st Baron Glantawe (1835–1915), Welsh MP for Carmarthen
- Edward Jenkins (MP) (John Edward Jenkins, 1838–1910), British barrister, author and Liberal Party politician
- John J. Jenkins (1843–1911), Wisconsin congressman and Puerto Rico judge
- John Jenkins (Australian politician) (1851–1923), American-born Premier of South Australia
- John Jenkins (British politician) (1852–1936), British politician, MP for Chatham, 1906–1910
- John George Jenkins (1919–2007), Scottish farmers leader, TV presenter and politician
- John Barnard Jenkins (1933–2020), Welsh nationalist, effective leader of Mudiad Amddiffyn Cymru in the 1960s
- John Jenkins (American politician) (1952–2020), Maine state senator, mayor and candidate for governor of Maine
- Sir John Jenkins (diplomat) (born 1955), British ambassador to Saudi Arabia
- John Jenkins (Welsh politician) (born 1981), local politician in Wales

== Musicians, artists and entertainers ==
- John Jenkins (composer) (1592–1678), English composer
- Johnny Jenkins (1939–2006), guitarist
- John Jenkins (poet) (born 1949), Australian poet
- John Jenkins (jazz musician) (1931–1993), American saxophonist
- John Pickens Jenkins, better known as Bobo Jenkins (1916–1984), American blues singer and record label owner
- John A. Jenkins (born 1950), American journalist and author

== Sportspeople ==
- John Jenkins (American football coach) (born 1952), American football coach
- John Jenkins (defensive back) (born 1975), American football player
- John Jenkins (defensive tackle) (born 1989), American football player
- John Jenkins (Australian footballer) (1936–1980), Australian footballer for Richmond and North Melbourne
- John Jenkins (baseball) (1896–1968), Chicago White Sox baseball player
- John Jenkins (basketball) (born 1991), American basketball player
- John Jenkins (figure skater) (born 1970), British figure skater
- John Jenkins (racing driver) (1875–1945), American auto racer
- John Jenkins (rugby) (1880–1971), Welsh rugby union and rugby league footballer

== Other people ==
- John Jenkins (penmanship) (1755–1822), American schoolteacher who devised a popular style of penmanship
- John Jenkins (Ifor Ceri) (1770–1829), Welsh Church of England priest and antiquarian
- John Carmichael Jenkins (1809–1855), American plantation owner in the Antebellum South
- John David Jenkins (1828–1876), Welsh Tractarian clergyman and railwaymen's union President
- John Lewis Jenkins (1857–1912), British administrator in the Imperial Civil Service
- John Jenkins (Gwili) (1872–1936), Welsh poet, theologian and Archdruid, 1932–1936
- John I. Jenkins (born 1953), former president of the University of Notre Dame, 2005–2024
- John Jenkins, former director of the University of Massachusetts Minuteman Marching Band
- John Holmes Jenkins (1940–1989), American historian, antiquarian bookseller, publisher, and poker player
- John Brady Jenkins, American drug dealer in The Yogurt Connection drug smuggling ring
- John Major Jenkins (1964–2017), American author and populariser of the Maya calendar

== See also ==
- Jack Jenkins (disambiguation)
- Jackie Jenkins (disambiguation)
- Jon Jenkins (born 1958), Australian politician
