= Captain Jenkins =

Captain Jenkins may refer to:

- Robert Jenkins (master mariner), a British sailor tortured by his Spanish captors by the removal of an ear
  - War of Jenkins' Ear, the ensuing war
- Bill Jenkins (Royal Marines officer) (1925–2002)
- Lawrence L. Jenkins (1924–2017), pilot and prisoner of war in World War II
- William Stanley Jenkins (1890–1966), Canadian flying ace in World War I
