= William Mallinson =

William Mallinson may refer to:

- William Mallinson (auctioneer), involved with the Sugarman Gang
- Sir William Mallinson, 1st Baronet (1854–1936) of the Mallinson Baronets
- Sir William James Mallinson, 2nd Baronet (1879–1944) of the Mallinson Baronets
- Sir (William) Paul Mallinson, 3rd Baronet (1909–1989) of the Mallinson Baronets
- Sir William John Mallinson, 4th Baronet (1942–1995) of the Mallinson Baronets
- Sir (William) James Mallinson, 5th Baronet (b. 1970) of the Mallinson Baronets
