= William Jenkins =

William, or Will Jenkins may refer to:

== Law and politics ==
- William Miller Jenkins (1856–1941), American politician
- William Jenkins (Labour politician) (1871–1944), British politician, MP for Neath
- William Franklin Jenkins (1876–1961), American jurist in Georgia
- William Jenkins (coal merchant) (1878–1968), British politician, MP for Brecon and Radnor
- William Jenkins (Australian politician) (1895–1963), South Australian politician
- William Jenkins (Northern Ireland politician) (1904–?), Lord Mayor of Belfast
- William Jenkins (Canadian politician) (1921–1995), Canadian politician in Manitoba

== Military ==
- William Stanley Jenkins (1890–1966), Canadian WWI flying ace
- William A. Jenkins (1917–2022), United States Coast Guard rear admiral
- William (Bill) Jenkins (1925–2002), English Royal Marines officer

== Sports ==
- William Jenkins (cricketer) (1788–1844), English cricketer
- William Jenkins (New Zealand) (1813–1902), New Zealand sailor, horse-trainer and jockey
- Will Jenkins (born 1994), English cricketer

== Others ==
- William O. Jenkins (1878–1963), American businessman in Mexico
- Murray Leinster (born William Fitzgerald Jenkins, 1896–1975), American science fiction author
- Bill Jenkins (bishop) (born 1963), American bishop in the Reformed Episcopal Church
- William Jenkins (veterinarian) (1937–2025), South-African veterinary scientist

== See also ==
- Lynching of Willie Lee Jenkins
- Bill Jenkins (disambiguation)
- Billy Jenkins (disambiguation)
