= Chris Jenkins =

Chris Jenkins may refer to:

- Chris Jenkins (actor) (born 1987), Welsh actor
- Chris Jenkins (boxer) (born 1988), Welsh boxer
- Chris Jenkins (film producer) (born 1960/1961), Welsh film producer
- Chris Jenkins (powerlifter), Welsh powerlifter and martial artist
- Chris Jenkins (sound engineer), American sound engineer

== See also ==
- Christopher Martin-Jenkins (1945–2013), cricket journalist
- Kris Jenkins (born 1979), American football player
- Kris Jenkins (American football, born 2001) (born 2001), American football player
- Kris Jenkins (basketball) (born 1993), American basketball player
- Jenkins (name)
- List of people with surname Jenkins
