= Spennymoor Town F.C. =

Coordinates: 54°42′16.29″N 1°35′56.87″W

Spennymoor Town
- Full name: Spennymoor Town Football Club
- Nickname: The Moors
- Founded: 2005; 21 years ago
- Ground: The Brewery Field; Spennymoor; County Durham
- Capacity: 4,300
- Chairman: Bradley Groves
- Manager: Peter Hartley
- League: National League North
- 2025–26: National League North, 10th of 24
- Website: spennymoortownfc.co.uk
Home colours	Away colours

Spennymoor Town Football Club is a football club based in Spennymoor, County Durham, England. The team currently compete in the National League North, the sixth level of the English football league system. They currently play their home matches at The Brewery Field.

The club began playing in the Northern League in 1931–32 as Evenwood Town, reaching the first round of the FA Cup in the 1956–57 season. In 2005, the club merged with Spennymoor United, who had folded earlier that year, and collectively changed their name to Spennymoor Town. They won the Northern League Division Two division in 2006–07. Spennymoor then won the Northern League division four times before joining the Northern Premier League in 2014 as well as winning the FA Vase in 2012–13. Spennymoor then won two automatic promotions via the play-offs to reach the National League North by 2017.

== Spennymoor United ==
Spennymoor United had some success over the years. In the 1977–78 season, the club reached the semi-final of the FA Trophy, where they lost to Leatherhead 2–0 away in the first leg and won 2–1 at home in the second Leg, therefore, losing 3–2 on aggregate. That year, Spennymoor United also won the Northern League for the fifth time in the space of 10 years. The following year, Spennymoor reached the 2nd Round of the FA Trophy.

During the 1990–91 season, Spennymoor joined the Northern Counties East League Premier Division and in the 1992–93 season were crowned champions, only on goal difference. The following season, they were runners-up of the Northern Premier League Division One and were promoted to the Premier Division. However, at the turn of the new millennium, with financial troubles resulting in losing 35 out of their 44 fixtures, they were relegated for the first time in their history. In the 2002–03 season, they were promoted back to the Premier Division as runners-up after losing the title on goal difference. The following season, the clubhouse was burnt down on Christmas Day 2003 and the club had lost their main source of income.

In the 2004–05 season, Spennymoor were deducted 24 points after failing to fulfil the fixture list due to not being able to field a side. During that season, manager Graeme Clarke resigned after losing 5–1 to Gateshead on 25 March 2005. The club resigned from the league after 33 games that season and later folded, which caused controversy over the unfulfilled fixtures.

== History ==
Spennymoor United was reborn under the name of Spennymoor Town, after a merger with Evenwood Town, who were on the verge of folding in the same year. Out of the gloom, people were working hard and managed to get the club together for the start of 2005–06. Headed by Alan Murray the fans rallied round and formed an independent supporters group, initially with the aim of running the club themselves. Both groups submitted their bids with the local council, but after a meeting held at the Penny Gill pub in Spennymoor, it was agreed to stand down and let Alan Murray's plan go ahead. The application proceeded with the name change to Spennymoor Town, the club were accepted into the Northern League Division Two.

=== Northern League (2005–2014) ===
==== Division Two (2005–2007) ====
On 13 August 2005, the first league game as Spennymoor Town was to be played at home against Darlington RA, which was met with a major attraction from the town. The official attendance for that first game was 511 people, in which the newly formed Spennymoor Town were victorious with a 3–2 win. The following Tuesday, The Moors carried on their winning ways, beating Guisborough 3–1. In the first four home games under the new name, one of those including The F.A Cup preliminary round, the club attracted over 1300 people to The Brewery Field.

In their first season, the club got off to a good start under then manager Ken Houlahan. In January 2006, Houlahan left his post as manager to become Director of Football and Justin Perry was appointed Player-Manager, finishing the season in a respectable 8th position. But things behind the scenes were not good, a rift between the club and the fans grew, as did the rift between the committee and the chairman. Business man Alan Murray was replaced as chairman in his absence during a board meeting. During the summer of 2006 the situation came to a head and resulted in the entire committee resigning their posts, taking all but four players with them. The club was taken over by Chairman Alan Murray, with Alan Courtney returning as vice chairman. The club also tried to change its name back to Spennymoor United before the 2006–07 season. However, the FA rejected the proposal.

In June 2006, a management team of Jamie Pollock and Moors favourite Jason Ainsley was put in place. Together they put together a strong squad of players. After a slow start, consisting of six away games out of the first seven, and a high number of draws, the squad went from strength to strength. They went unbeaten in the league from November, until 7 April 2007, where they travelled to Penrith. Backed by a travelling support of over 150 fans, if they won and Seaham lost, they would be champions. At half time, the news came through that Seaham were losing 3–1. Spennymoor's place was booked as champions when Tom Jones netted an 87th-minute winner.

During the summer of 2007, then Manager Jamie Pollock left the club, stating "he wanted to concentrate on getting his coaching badges and pursue his career at a higher level" and moors favourite Jason Ainsley was swiftly given the position of first team manager. Yet another crisis hit the club during this summer when the council evicted the club from its home of 103 years. However, a new 25-year lease was agreed on 25 September 2007, securing the future of the club.

==== Division One (2007–2014) ====
Spennymoor's first season back in the 1st Division of the Northern League resulted in them finishing in a mid-table position. They also had a few memorable cup games, defeating higher league opposition in Garforth Town and Brigg Town. They narrowly missed out on a Durham Challenge Cup final appearance against Sunderland, losing the semi-final to a 120th-minute winner 1–0 at Gateshead. In the 2008–09 season, the club chairman resigned, but Spennymoor battled against the odds and finished 4th in the league on goal difference below Newcastle Benfield, Consett and Whitley Bay. Also notable in this season, Spennymoor reached the 5th Round of the FA Vase, losing 2–0 away to Bideford.

The 2009–10 season was a success, with the arrival of former Aston Villa player Bradley Groves as club chairman, with former Newcastle and West Ham United Striker Paul Kitson as president. Spennymoor were crowned Northern Football League Division One Champions with 100 points, at the time being only the third team ever to do so and a feat that was surpassed the season after by winning the league with 103 points. Despite winning the league in three consecutive seasons (2009–10, 2010–11, 2011–12), the club did not apply for promotion as they wanted to be financially stable before they took the next step up. Although an application for promotion was subsequently made after their runners-up position in 2012–13 to Darlington 1883 (again breaking the 100 point mark), the club was not deemed by the FA worthy enough of an offer of promotion. At the beginning of the season, then Assistant Manager Brian Atkinson joined Martin Gray at Darlington 1883 and Gavin Fell took the position of Assistant Manager. Also in this season, Spennymoor reached the final of the FA Vase for the first time and defeated Tunbridge Wells 2–1 in front of 16,000 people, followed by a victory parade around the town the following Monday. Along with the cup runs and the loss of winter games due to bad weather, the season was eventually extended into the middle of May as the club played over 80 games if pre-season friendlies are included.

In the 2013–14 season, Spennymoor Town started off retaining the JR Cleator Cup, as the league champions Darlington declined the invitation to compete. Spennymoor also made their 3rd consecutive appearance in the Durham Challenge Cup final and ultimately lost 2–1 against a strong Shildon side thanks to a last minute Shildon goal. This year Spennymoor won the league for the 4th time in 5 years, beating strong promotion rivals Celtic Nation by 5 points and finishing the season unbeaten at home in league matches.

=== The NPL 1st Division North (2014–2017) ===
The club had applied for promotion into the pyramid during the 2013–14 season and played their first competitive game outside of the Northern League away to Padiham on 16 August 2014, winning 2–0.

Spennymoor also had a good run in the FA Cup, reaching the 4th Qualifying Round, beating Tadcaster Albion, Bishop Auckland, Dunston UTS and Ashton United and finally losing in a replay against AFC Telford United. In the first match, Spennymoor were winning 2–0 by the 90th minute, but Telford scored two goals in injury time to secure the replay. In the replay, Spennymoor were beaten 3–0 to secure Telford's place in the 1st Round against Basingstoke Town

Spennymoor recorded their 250th win as Spennymoor Town at home versus Kendal Town on 16 December 2014. On 23 December 2014, then Assistant Manager Gavin Fell left his post after 2 1/2 years with the club and was replaced by ex Gateshead and West Auckland manager Anthony Smith. Spennymoor finished their first season in the NPL Division One North in 5th place on 77 points and but lost 3–2 against Darlington 1883 in the play-off semi-final.

In 2016, Spennymoor claimed the runners-up spot in Division One North and entered the play-offs for the second season in succession. Spennymoor saw off Burscough in the semi-final, to set up a final against Northwich Victoria at Brewery Field with Spennymoor winning the game 2–0 in front of 1,129 fans thus sealing promotion for the second time in three years and guaranteeing them a place at Step 3 for the first time since Spennymoor United was dissolved in 2005.

In the 2016–17 season, Spennymoor finished runners-up to Blyth Spartans, qualifying for the play-offs. They saw off Nantwich Town 2–0 at Brewery Field, thus qualifying for the final and a place in the National League North. On 29 April 2017, Spennymoor hosted Stourbridge in the Northern Premier League Premier Division play-off final, a goal from Rob Ramshaw sealed a 1–0 victory at Brewery Field. Spennymoor had therefore reached their highest position in the footballing pyramid of any team from the town and took their place in the National League North for the 2017–18 Season. They also reached the first round of the FA Cup for the first time, losing 3–2 to League One club MK Dons.

=== National League North (2017–present) ===
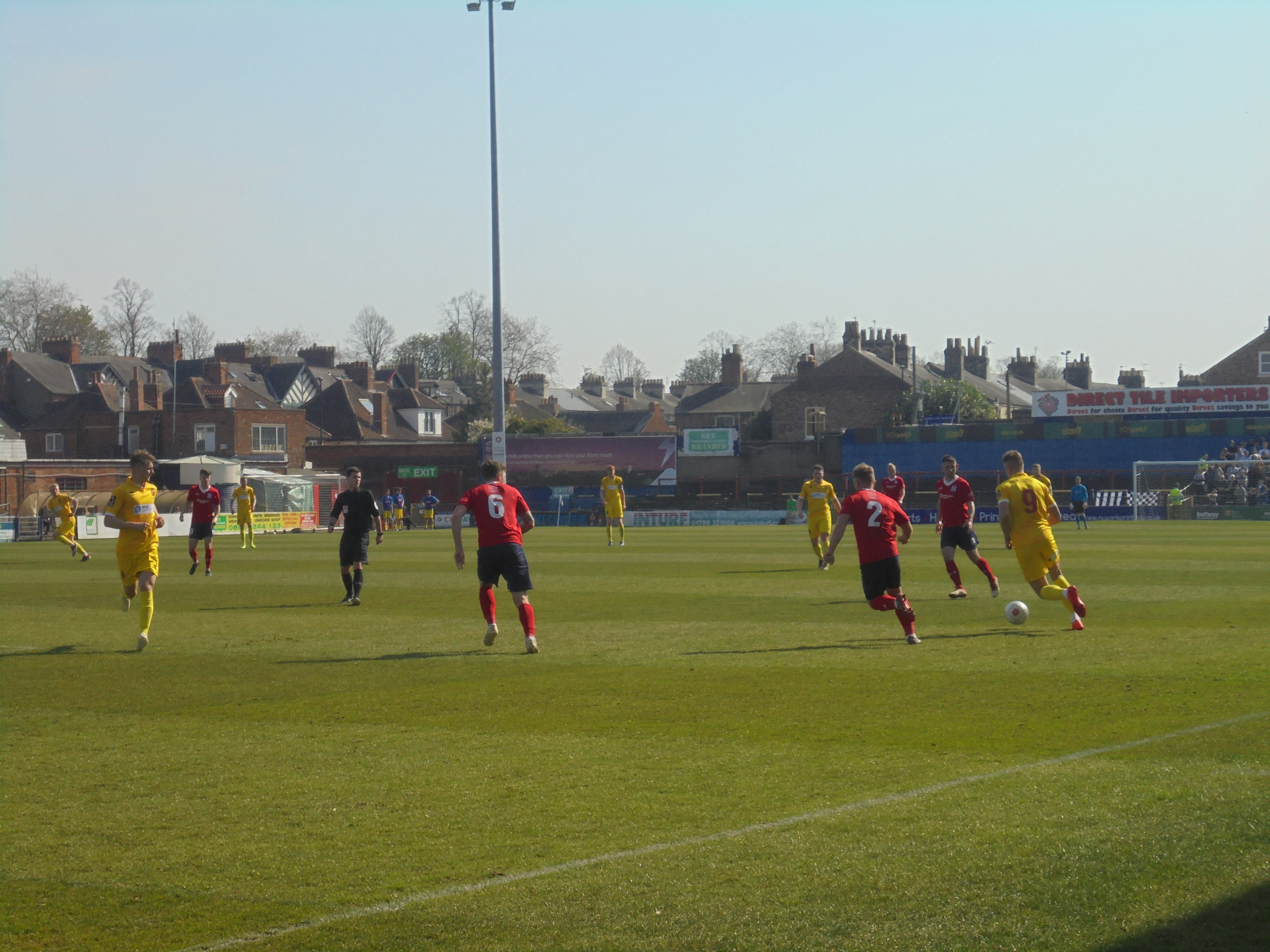
Spennymoor Town against York City at Bootham Crescent in 2019.

Spennymoor began the 2017–18 season in the National League North for the first time in their history. The Moors reached the FA Trophy quarter-finals for the first time before losing to Bromley. During the 2018–19 season, Spennymoor finished 4th, qualifying for the play-offs. However, they were defeated in the play-off final on penalties by Chorley after a 1–1 draw. In December 2020, Jason Ainsley stepped down as Spennymoor manager by mutual consent after 14 years with the club and after having won eleven trophies with the side.

Jamie Chandler was appointed as the new Spennymoor manager at the end of the 2022–23 season. However, Chandler resigned from this position on 22 September 2023 after nine matches in charge. Lewis Dickman was appointed on an interim basis before departing in December. Graeme Lee was appointed as the new first-team manager.

In 2024–25, the club reached the final of the FA Trophy for the first time in the club's history, after they defeated National League side Rochdale away from home 5–4 on penalties after a 2–2 draw, which saw them return to Wembley 12 years on from the FA Vase win. Alongside Rochdale, Spennymoor also defeated Sutton United en route to the final, both teams sitting a division higher than the Moors. Spennymoor faced Aldershot Town in the final but lost 3–0.

== Stadium ==
Throughout Spennymoor United's history, their home venue was the Brewery Field. They started using the Brewery Field when the club was formed in 1904 and took over use of it from Tudhoe Rugby Club. The ground itself used to belong to 'Tower Brewery', which was located on King Street, hence the name 'Brewery Field'. The ground is located near the bottom of Spennymoor, on Wood Vue off Durham Road.

After the merger with Evenwood Town, Spennymoor Town were granted the lease from the town council and decided to carry on using The Brewery Field for their home games. Most notably to the fans, the sign over the Wood Vue entrance had the 'United A.F.C.' removed and left with just 'Spennymoor'. In late 2012 and early 2013, a lot of upgrades were made to the ground, including brand new floodlights, manufactured by local company Thorn Lighting to replace the old ones, which had been at the ground for over 40 years. Other improvements were made, such as a tunnel for the players leading into the home and away dressing rooms and new dugouts on the far side of the pitch, as well as new terracing and access for disabled fans. New work is planned to rebuild the old clubhouse that was burnt down on Christmas Day 2003.

Spennymoor Town's biggest attendance at Brewery Field came in February 2013 when 2,670 fans turned out for a Northern Football League Division One game against Championship rivals Darlington.

== Supporters and rivalries ==
Spennymoor were the biggest supported club in the Northern League in the 2013–14 season.

Spennymoor's local rivals are considered to be Bishop Auckland, one of the oldest members of the Northern League, who currently play at Heritage Park. Since 2012–13, Spennymoor have had a competitive rivalry with Darlington where they were rivals for the Northern League Championship, Darlington would pip Spennymoor to the title in 2012–13, where both teams finished the season collecting more than 100 points. Both teams met again two seasons later in the Northern Premier League Division One North where Darlington battered Spennymoor in the play-offs. The rivalry was once again ignited in 2017–18 when Spennymoor confirmed their place in the National League North.

== Players ==
=== Current squad ===
As of 18 August 2026

Note: Flags indicate national team as defined under FIFA eligibility rules; some limited exceptions apply. Players may hold more than one non-FIFA nationality.

No.	Pos.	Nation	Player
1	GK	ENG	Brad James
2	DF	ENG	Louis Stephenson
3	DF	ENG	Dan Jones
4	MF	ENG	George Cantrill
5	DF	ENG	Frankie Whelan
6	DF	ENG	Ben Beals
7	FW	ENG	Aiden Marsh
8	MF	ENG	Jack Jenkins
9	FW	ENG	Glen Taylor (captain)
10	MF	ENG	Rob Ramshaw (vice-captain)
11	FW	ENG	Junior Mondal
13	GK	ENG	Lyle Robson

No.	Pos.	Nation	Player
14	DF	ENG	Campbell Darcy
16	DF	ENG	Ben Pollock
17	MF	ENG	Harley Dawson
20	MF	ENG	Tom Miller
21	GK	ENG	Zac Hadi
24	MF	ENG	Cameron Salkeld
26	FW	ENG	Richie Bennett
27	MF	ENG	Jack Young
29	MF	ENG	Matthew Dolan
30	FW	ENG	Cole Raine
39	FW	ENG	Danny Johnson
—	DF	ENG	Sam Murray

== Leadership and management ==
As of 4 February 2024

=== Club board ===
Position	Name
Chairman	Bradley Groves
Managing Director	Ian Geldard
Non-Executive Director	Debra Swinburn
Non-Executive Director	Tony Wilson
Non-Executive Director	Bobby Taylor

=== Club representatives ===
Position	Name
Honorary President	Trevor Beaumont
Head of Football	Jason Ainsley

=== Club management ===
Position	Name
Club Secretary and Media & Communications Manager	Mark Simpson
Head Groundsman	Mark Sleightholme

=== Coaching staff ===
==== First team ====
As of 2 September 2026

- First-team managers: Vacant
- Assistant manager: Gavin Cogdon
- Goalkeeper Coach/Analyst: Dan Wilson
- Physio: Jamie Sinclair
- Head of Football Development: Gavin Cogdon

=== Managers ===
As of match played 18 May 2023

Only counts competitive matches.

Name	Nationality	Period	P	W	D	L	Win%	Honours
Peter Hartley	England	2026–	0	0	0	0	0%	–
Graeme Lee	England	2024–2026	95	43	23	28	45.26%	–
Lewis Dickman	England	2023	17	4	3	10	21.05%	–
Jamie Chandler	England	2023	9	4	2	3	44.44%	–
Anthony Johnson and Bernard Morley	England	2021–2022						–
Tommy Miller	England	2020–2021 (caretaker), 2021						–
Jason Ainsley	England	2007–2020, 2022–2023	727	439	127	161	60.39%	4 Northern League Division 1 Champions, 4 JR Cleator Cup Winners, FA Vase Winners, Durham Challenge Cup Winners, Northern League Challenge Cup Winners Northern League Manager of the Year 2012–13; FWA's non-League Manager of the Year 2013
Jamie Pollock	England	2006–2007	47	31	8	8	65.96%	Northern League Division 2 Champions
Justin Perry	England	2006	17	9	2	6	52.94%	None
Ken Houlahan	England	2005–2006	30	12	9	9	40%	None

== Records ==
=== Evenwood Town FC ===
- Best FA Cup performance: First round, 1956–57
- Best FA Trophy performance: Second qualifying round, 1976–77
- Best FA Vase performance: First round, 1987–88, 1989–90, 1992–93, 1993–94, 1994–95, 2001–02
- Best FA Amateur Cup performance: Quarter-finals, 1972–73 (replay)

=== Spennymoor Town FC ===
- Best FA Cup performance: First round, 2016–17,2025–26
- Best FA Trophy performance: Runners-up, 2024–25
- Best FA Vase performance: Champions, 2012–13
- Furthest travelled for an English Cup Competition: 432 Miles v Guernsey, FA Vase Semi-final 1st Leg, 23 March 2013
- Record Points: 109 Points, 2012–13 Season
- Biggest Home Victory: 10–0 v Billingham Town, Northern Football League Division 1, 18 March 2014
- Biggest Away Victory: 7–0 v Billingham Town, Northern Football League Division 1, 11 January 2014
- Biggest Home Defeat: 6–1 v Bamber Bridge, Northern Premier League Division One North, 8 November 2014
- Biggest Away Defeat: 8–2 v Clitheroe, FA Cup 2nd Qualifying Round, 29 September 2007
- Biggest Home Attendance: 2,670 v Darlington 1883, Northern Football League Division 1, 15 February 2013
- Longest Unbeaten Home Run: (League) 46 Games, 8 January 2011 – 15 February 2013
- Longest Unbeaten Away Run: (League) 20 Games, 14 April 2012 – 18 April 2013
- Most games won in a row: (League) 19 Games, 31 March 2012 – 10 October 2012
- Most games lost in a row: (League) 3 Games, 11 April 2006 – 18 April 2006

=== Player records ===
- Record goalscorer: Glen Taylor, 239 Goals
- Player with most appearances: Lewis Dodds, 227 Appearances
- Player with most goals in a single season: Liam Henderson, 37 Goals, 2013–14 Season
- Players with most goals in one match:
  - Craig Hubbard, Home vs Morpeth Town, 28 April 2010, 4 Goals
  - Michael Rae, Away vs Billingham Town, 9 October 2010, 4 Goals
  - Liam Henderson, Home vs Billingham Town, 18 March 2014, 4 Goals

== Honours ==
Spennymoor Town's honours include the following:

League

- Northern Premier League
  - Premier Division play-off winners: 2017
  - Division One play-off winners: 2016
- Northern League
  - Division One champions: 2009–10, 2010–11, 2011–12, 2013–14
  - Division One runners-up: 2012–13
  - Division Two champions: 2006–07

Cup

- FA Trophy
  - Runners-up: 2024–25
- FA Vase
  - Winners: 2012–13
- Durham County Challenge Cup
  - Winners: 2011–12
  - Runners-up: 2012–13, 2013–14
- Brooks Mileson Memorial League Cup
  - Winners: 2012–13
  - Runners-up: 2010–11
- JR Cleator Cup
  - Winners: 2011–12, 2012–13, 2013–14, 2014–15

== Affiliated clubs ==
- Spennymoor Town Youth FC (See below)
- Sunderland
- Coxhoe Athletic
- Parkhill FC
- Plymouth Parkway FC
- Esh Winning FC
