= John Manuel =

John Manuel may refer to:

- John Manuel (writer), baseball writer and scout
- John G. Manuel, Canadian First World War flying ace
