= General Jenkins =

General Jenkins may refer to:

- Albert G. Jenkins (1830–1864), Confederate States Army brigadier general
- David Jenkins (British Army officer) (born 1945), British Army major general
- Gwyn Jenkins (fl. 2010s–2020s), Royal Marines major general
- Harry W. Jenkins (fl. 1960s–1990s), U.S. Marine Corps major general
- Micah Jenkins (1835–1864), Confederate States Army brigadier general
- Reuben Ellis Jenkins (1896–1975), U.S. Army lieutenant general
- Sean M. Jenkins (born 1966), U.S. Army major general

== See also ==
- Attorney General Jenkins (disambiguation)
