= Bill Jenkins =

Bill Jenkins may refer to:

- Bill Jenkins (politician) (born 1936), American politician
- Bill Jenkins (drag racer) (1930–2012), American drag racer
- Bill Jenkins (Royal Marines officer) (1925–2002), youngest Royal Marine to win a DSO in the Second World War
- Bill Jenkins (epidemiologist) (1945–2019), government whistleblower
- Bill Jenkins (bishop) (born 1963), American bishop in the Reformed Episcopal Church
- Bill Jenkins (voice actor), American voice actor for Funimation
- Bill Jenkins (curler) (1957–2025), Canadian curler

== See also ==
- Bill Jenkings (1915–1996), Australian news reporter
- Billy Jenkins (disambiguation)
- William Jenkins (disambiguation)
