= Paul Mallinson =

Paul Mallinson may refer to:

- Paul Mallinson (author), see Resident Evil 2 and Star Wars Jedi Knight: Mysteries of the Sith
- Paul Mallinson of the Mallinson Baronets
