= Harry Jenkins (disambiguation) =

Harry Jenkins (born 1952) is an Australian Labor politician.

Harry Jenkins may also refer to:

- Harry Jenkins Sr. (1925–2004), Australian Labor politician
- Harry Reginald Jenkins (1881–1970), New Zealand Member of Parliament
- Harry W. Jenkins, general in the United States Marine Corps

== See also ==
- Henry Jenkins (disambiguation)
- Harold Jenkins (disambiguation)
