= Billy Jenkins =

Billy Jenkins may refer to:

- Billy Jenkins (rugby union) (1885-1956), Welsh international forward, played club rugby for Swansea
- Billy Jenkins (musician) (born 1956), English blues guitarist, composer, and bandleader
- Billy Jenkins (American football) (born 1974), American football defensive back
- Billy Jenkins (Australian footballer) (born 1914), Australian rules footballer
- Billy Jenkins (actor) (born 2007), British actor

== See also ==
- Bill Jenkins (disambiguation)
- William Jenkins (disambiguation)
