= Samuel Lewis Honey =

Samuel Lewis Honey VC DCM MM
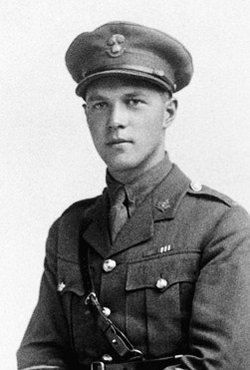
- Born: 9 February 1894; Conn, Ontario
- Died: 30 September 1918 (aged 24); Bourlon Wood, near Canal du Nord, France
- Burial place: Queant Communal Cemetery, Pas de Calais, France
- Military career
- Allegiance: Canada
- Branch: Canadian Expeditionary Force
- Service years: 1915–1918
- Rank: Lieutenant
- Nickname: Lew
- Units: 78th Battalion, CEF
- Conflicts: First World War: Battle of Arras; Battle of Vimy Ridge; Battle of the Canal du Nord †
- Awards: Victoria Cross; Distinguished Conduct Medal; Military Medal

Samuel Lewis Honey, VC DCM MM (9 February 1894 – 30 September 1918) was a soldier in the Canadian Expeditionary Force, and posthumous recipient of the Victoria Cross, the highest military award for gallantry in the face of the enemy given to British and Commonwealth forces, during the First World War. He had already been awarded the Military Medal and Distinguished Conduct Medal for actions earlier in the war.

== Early life ==
Samuel Lewis Honey was born on 9 February 1894 in Conn in Ontario to Reverend George Edward Honey and Metta née Blaisdell. His father, originally from Boston, was a Methodist who moved his family from town to town as he took up a succession of ministries. Honey, who was known to his family as "Lew", attended schools in Drayton, Princeton and London, all in Ontario.

When he was 17, Honey taught at schools on the Six Nations Indian Reserve in Ontario. He then resumed his own education, attending Walkerton High School from which he graduated in mid-1914 with honours in several subjects. He returned to teaching for a brief period while planning to enter Victoria College at University of Toronto. However, with the First World War underway, he decided to join the Canadian Expeditionary Force.

== First World War ==
Honey enlisted on 22 January 1915 and was posted to the 34th Battalion of the Canadian Expeditionary Force as a private. The battalion departed for England in October 1915, and by this time Honey had been promoted to sergeant. While in England he served as a physical fitness instructor, and briefly served with the 87th Battalion (Canadian Grenadier Guards), CEF before being transferred to the 78th Battalion, which was engaged on the Western Front.

He earned the Military Medal for his actions in a raid on German trenches on 22 February 1917, providing cover for both his squad and another in the face of heavy grenade fire, having cleared a communications trench. Afterwards, Honey wrote that his entire party deserved recognition as well. In April 1917, he fought in the Battle of Vimy Ridge, earning the Distinguished Conduct Medal (DCM) for leadership and maintaining morale in the face of extremely heavy fire. He was modest about his DCM, stating in correspondence that he was simply lucky.

Recommended for a commission after the battle, Honey was subsequently selected for officer training. Sent to England, he spent time at Bramshott Camp as an instructor before taking an officer's course at Bexhill. He was commissioned as a lieutenant in October 1917 and returned to the 78th Battalion for duty.

In late September 1918 at Bourlon Wood, the 78th Battalion participated in the Battle of the Canal du Nord (a part of Canada's Hundred Days). During the fighting on 27 September, Honey had to take command of his company due to all the other officers becoming casualties. He led the company in clearing German strongpoints and defending a number of counterattacks. Towards the end of the battle, he was wounded and died on 30 September 1918. He was buried in Pas de Calais in France, at the Queant Communal Cemetery.

For his actions during the Battle of the Canal du Nord, Honey was awarded the Victoria Cross (VC). The VC, instituted in 1856, was the highest award for valour that could be bestowed on a soldier of the British Empire. The citation for his VC, gazetted in early January 1919, read:

For most conspicuous bravery during the Bourlon Wood operations, 27th September to 2nd October, 1918. On 27th September, when his company commander and all other officers of his company had become casualties, Lt. Honey took command and skilfully reorganised under very severe fire. He continued the advance with great dash and gained the objective. Then finding that his company was suffering casualties from enfilade machine-gun fire he located the machine-gun nest and rushed it single-handed, capturing the guns and ten prisoners. Subsequently he repelled four enemy counter-attacks and after dark again went out alone, and having located an enemy post, led a party which captured the post and three guns. On the 29th September he led his company against a strong enemy position with great skill and daring and continued in the succeeding days of the battle to display the same high example of valour and self-sacrifice. He died of wounds received during the last day of the attack by his battalion.

— London Gazette

There was no formal presentation of the VC to Honey's relatives, at their request. Instead, the medal was sent to Canada by the War Office. In turn, the Governor General forwarded it on by mail to Honey's father. Plaques to his memory exist in several locations; Wescott United Church in Conn, Valour Place in Cambridge, Ontario, and the Galt Armoury.

== Medals ==
Honey's medals, from left to right: the Victoria Cross, Distinguished Conduct Medal, Military Medal, British War Medal, Victory Medal

His Victoria Cross is displayed at the Canadian War Museum in Ottawa, Canada, alongside his Distinguished Conduct Medal, Military Medal, British War Medal and Victory Medal.
