= Allan Jenkins =

Alan, Allan or Allen Jenkins may refer to:

- Allan Jenkins (footballer) (born 1981), Scottish footballer
- Allen Jenkins (1900–1974), American character actor
- Alan Jenkins (poet) (born 1955), British poet; winner of the 1994 Forward Poetry Prize
- Alan Jenkins (engineer) (born 1947), former designer with McLaren, and technical director of Footwork Arrows Formula One motor racing teams

== See also ==
- Al Jenkins (disambiguation)
