= Mick Jenkins (disambiguation) =

Mick Jenkins may refer to:

- Mick Jenkins (rugby league) (born 1972), Welsh rugby footballer
- Mick Jenkins (rapper) (born 1991), American rapper

== See also ==
- Michael Jenkins (disambiguation)
