= Attorney General Jenkins =

Attorney General Jenkins may refer to:

- Charles J. Jenkins (1805–1883), Attorney General of Georgia
- Edward Enoch Jenkins (1895–1960), Attorney General of Fiji
- Hugh S. Jenkins (1903–1976), Attorney General of Ohio

== See also ==
- General Jenkins (disambiguation)
