= 87th Battalion (Canadian Grenadier Guards), CEF =

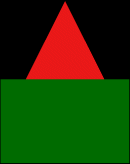
- Active: 15 September 1915 - 30 August 1920
- Country: Canada
- Branch: Canadian Expeditionary Force
- Role: Infantry
- Engagements: First World War

The 87th Battalion (Canadian Grenadier Guards), CEF was a Household Foot Guards infantry unit in the Canadian Expeditionary Force during the First World War.

== History ==
Based in Montreal, Quebec, the unit was authorized on September 15, 1915, as an exclusively Canadian Grenadier Guards (CGG) formation with Guards uniforms and accoutrements approved by The Governor General of Canada, HRH, Duke of Connaught (Colonel of the Canadian Grenadier Guards). Mobilization and recruiting for soldiers began on October 23, 1915.

More than 4,213 men served in the 87th Battalion, representing all regions of Canada, but predominantly Ontario, until the last few months of the war when the balance was furnished by soldiers from Quebec (included the need to form a francophone company) The battalion earned 17 battle honours at a cost of 886 dead and 2,246 wounded, many of them wounded multiple times.

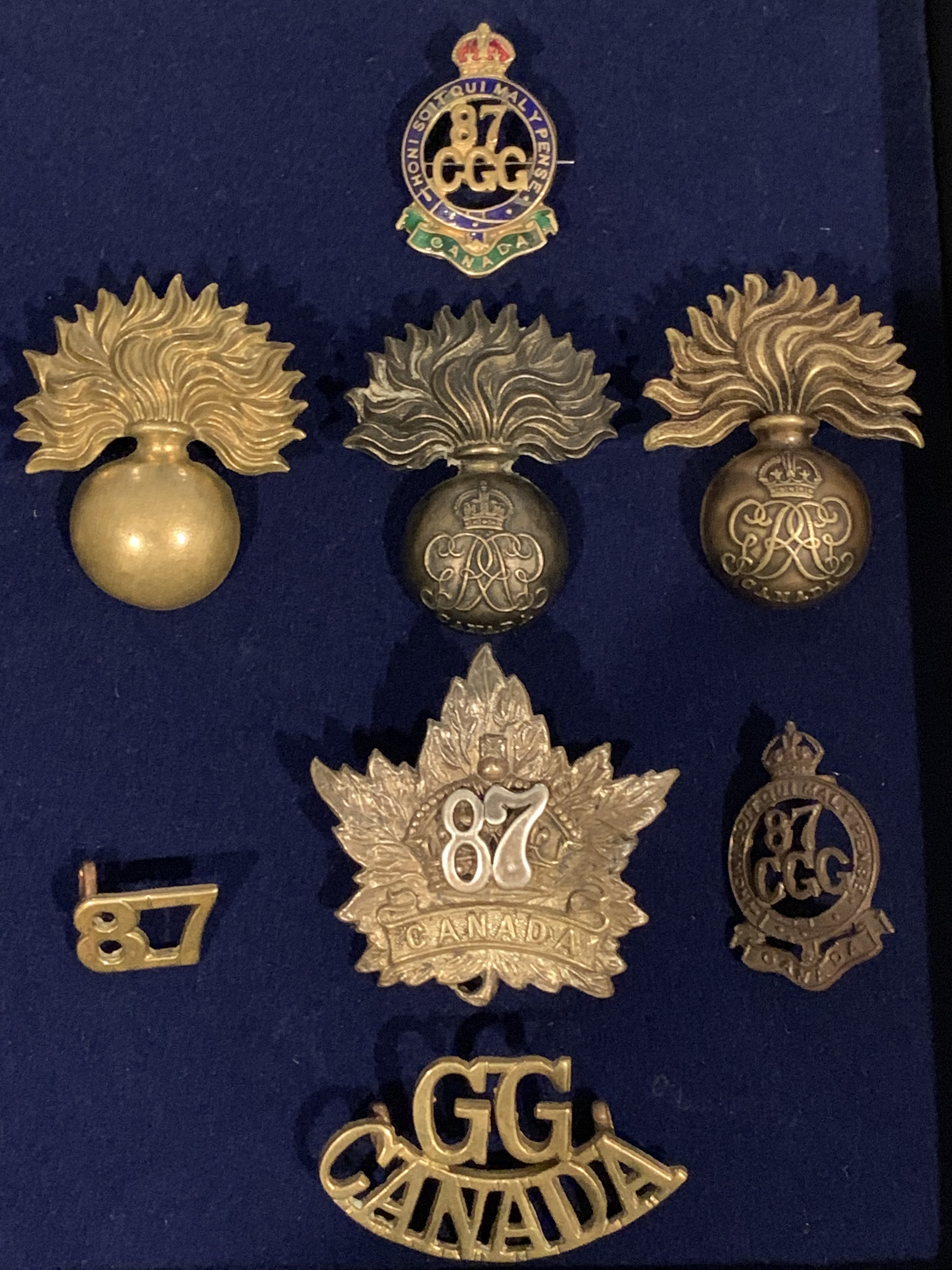
Badges of the 87th Battalion (Canadian Grenadier Guards) CEF - Hayes-Rivet (MHR) collection

=== Unit distinctions & achievements ===
The 87th Battalion (Canadian Grenadier Guards) CEF holds several distinctions in compared to other CEF battalions:

- CGG was one of only 7 Militia Regiments (out of 51 CEF units) to recruit their own battalions that fought as a distinct unit within the Canadian Corps.
- The 87th Battalion (Canadian Grenadier Guards) CEF was one of only 3 Canadian CEF Infantry units authorized by the Minister of Militia, Sir Sam Hughes, to recruit across all of Canada. The other 2 were the Royal Canadian Regiment and Princess Patricia's Canadian Light Infantry.
- The 87th Battalion (Canadian Grenadier Guards) was the only Canadian Foot Guards CEF unit active during The Great War. The Governor Generals Foot Guards (GGFG) contributed volunteers for the 2nd Battalion (Eastern Ontario Regiment), CEF, and the 77th Battalion CEF (Ottawa), CEF. The Governor Generals Horse Guards (GGHG) contributed men for the 4th and 7th Canadian Mounted Rifles (Bantams) CEF, but these were composite or regional units and none bore the title or accoutrements of a FootGuards unit.
- Title of 'Guardsman' was awarded by King George V in 1919 as a permanent distinction in conjunction with all other Guards units, in recognition of their collective contributions to victory in the Great War.
- 87th Battalion were the first to liberate Belgium on 5 November 1918. Patrols from the 87th Battalion (Canadian Grenadier Guards), of the 4th Division, crossed the River Aunelle, thereby marking the liberation, by the Canadians, of the first part of occupied Belgium.
- The 87th Battalion had within its ranks 4 members who Founded/Formed CEF Battalions during WWI: BGen Frank S. Meighen (14th and 87th Bns); Col. Hercule Barre (150th Bn); Maj. Olivar F-J. Asselin (163rd Bn); and LCol J. V. O'Donahoe, (199th Bn)
- The 87th Battalion contained 10% of the Black Canadian Soldiers who fought as part of Infantry Battalions during The Battle of Vimy Ridge.
- The 87th Battalion contained over 2.6% of CEF Canadian First Nation Soldiers who fought and were killed in action as part of the CEF during WW1. Tribes represented in CGG Uniform included Mohawk, Mi'kmaq, and Haudenosaunea. (Pte Angus Laforce 1916; Pte Archie Simpson 1917; Pte Harry Barnhart 1917; Pte Stephen Bernard 1917; Pte William Crow; Pte John Deny; Pte Arthur Honyust 1917; and Pte Joe John 1917.)

== Unit milestones ==
=== Mobilization and England ===
The 87th Battalion departed Canada after boarding R.M.S. Empress of Britain on April 23, 1916, and arrived in Liverpool, England on May 5, 1916. The battalion arrived and billeted on May 27 at Bramshott Military Camp as part of the 12th Infantry Brigade (until June 1916) and then designated as part of the 11th Infantry Brigade of the 4th Canadian Infantry Division in August of the same year. During the period in England, the battalion received training from an officer and four drill sergeants from the British Grenadier Guards, all trench veterans, all previously wounded in action (WIA). On August 11/12, the battalion crossed over to France and landed at Le Havre, France on August 13, 1916, with a total strength of 1,090 all ranks. The battalion served the duration of the war as part of the 11th Infantry Brigade, 4th Canadian Infantry Division.

=== First Actions & casualties ===
Following the Battle of Mont Sorrel, 303 members of the 87th Battalion were detached to reinforce the 1st Battalion (Ontario Regiment), CEF. Of these CGG members, two, 177281 Private John Leitch, (later KIA 9 April 1917), and 178218 Private William Anson Ogilvie, would distinguish themselves with the 1st Battalion during the Battle of the Somme and win multiple Military Medals for bravery in the field. The initial loss of men were replaced by 391 officers & men from the 77th, Battalion, (Ottawa) CEF, from the GGFG. The battalion was introduced and indoctrinated into trench warfare beginning August 18, 1916 in the Ypres area. Their first casualties, two wounded, occurred that same day. The first 87th Battalion fatality occurred on August 26, 1916. Total casualties for the first weeks of the war were eventually 17 KIA / 25 WIA. On September 16, 1916, the 87th battalion participated in their first trench raid resulting in 36 casualties out of 60 engaged unit members.

=== Battle of the Somme ===
On 10 October 1916, the 87th Battalion was relocated to Albert area along the Ancre area and on the 21 October, attacked and took a section of Regina Trench. The first gallantry awards earned by the 87th Battalion were awarded to four members for the attack on Regina Trench, CSM W. Blaney, Sgt. J.C. Noon, Ptes J.E. Blaney, and J.D. Hunter. After some routine activities and tours along the front, on November 18, the 87th Battalion was assigned to capture a section of Desire Trench, as well as its support systems. The attack was launched from Regina Trench. It succeeded well beyond expectations, and in addition to capturing Desire, Major Franklin Hall, with 41 volunteers, with only their rifles, bayonets, grenades and 2 Lewis Guns advanced a further 500 yards and captured part of Grandcourt Trench, including taking 115 prisoners. 80 of these were taken unaided by four privates; Roy, Thompson, Garneau and Winke.

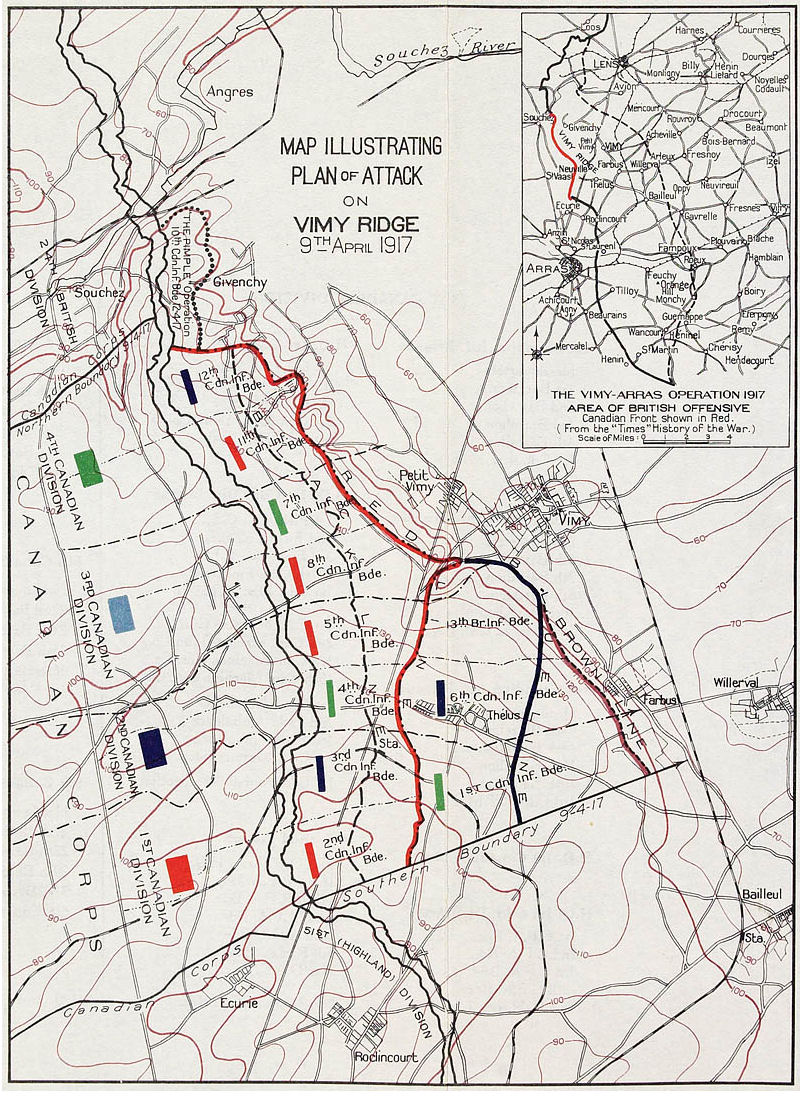
87th Battalion was to advance as part of the 11th Brigade, 4th Division. (2nd from top) Plan of Attack for Vimy Ridge 9 April 1917

=== Battle of Vimy Ridge ===
The Battle of Vimy Ridge was a gallant yet terrible tragedy for the battalion. One Military Cross (MC), 14 Military Medals(MM), and 1 Mentioned in Dispatches (MID) were awarded to members of the 87th Bn. Total casualties for the Battle were 315 all ranks out of an attacking force of 520 (60.6%). 10 of the 11 officers who led the first wave, were casualties.

"The 4th Canadian Division's principal objective was Hill 145, the highest and most important feature of the whole Ridge. Once taken, its summit would give the Canadians a commanding view of German rearward defences. Because of its importance, the Germans had fortified Hill 145 with well-wired trenches and a series of deep dug-outs beneath its rear slope. The brigades of the 4th Division were hampered by fire from the Pimple, the other prominent height, which inflicted costly losses on the advancing waves of infantry."

From the start of the battle, progress on the right was slow because, for a time, the centre had practically collapsed. The 87th Battalion (Canadian Grenadier Guards) were in the first wave but for some reason, a section of enemy trench barely a hundred metres in front of them had been left untouched by the artillery bombardment. Subsequently, the lead assault company was virtually wiped out within the first few minutes. This caused a delay of the other guardsmen so that they lost the barrage, and those who tried to continue the advance were cut down by German machine gunners firing from positions of relative safety in the untouched trenches.

"The 87th Battalion War diaries reports that six of the seven officers leading the 87th into battle were killed or wounded within the first hours. "Word had been received that Captain Harry Sare, MID (Officer Commanding the Assault), had been shot through the head with a bullet and could no longer carry on. Lieutenant Yonkles had also been hit in the left arm, Majors Joy and Ross and Lieut. Savage had been killed, and Lieut. Sinclair badly wounded, leaving Lieutenant Hannaford the only available officer of those who went over." The 87th Battalion first day casualties for April 9 at Vimy Ridge were 7 officers & 149 men killed; 4 officers and 155 men wounded with most having occurred have occurred within the first few minutes of the battle.

== Officers Commanding ==
- Lieut.-Col. F.S. Meighen (September 20, 1915 to March 29, 1916)
- Lieut.-Col. J. P. Rexford (March 27, 1916 to August 1, 1916)
- Lieut.-Col. R. W. Frost, DSO (August 2, 1916 to April 6, 1917)
- Major H. LeR. Shaw (April 7, 1917 to May 7, 1917)
- Lieut.-Col. J. V. P. O'Donahoe, DSO (May 8, 1917 to April 5, 1918)
- Major J. S. Ralston, MC (April 6, 1918 to May 14, 1918)
- Lieut.-Col. K. M. Perry, DSO and Bar (May 15, 1918 to September 10, 1918), one of only 92 Canadians of the CEF to be awarded a 2nd DSO
- Lieut.-Col. F. S. Meighen, CMG (October 14, 1918 to March 7, 1919)
- Lieut.-Col. R. Bickerdike, DSO and Bar (March 7, 1919, until demobilization), one of only 92 Canadians of the CEF to be awarded a 2nd DSO

== Battle honours ==
- Somme 1916
- Ancre Heights
- Ancre, 1916
- Arras, 1917 & 1918
- Vimy, 1917
- Hill 70
- Ypres, 1915
- Passchendaele, 1917
- Amiens, 1918
- Scarpe, 1918
- Drocourt-Queant
- Hindenburg Line
- Canal du Nord
- Valenciennes
- Sambre
- France and Flanders, 1916–18

== Victoria Cross Awards ==
=== Private John Francis Young ===
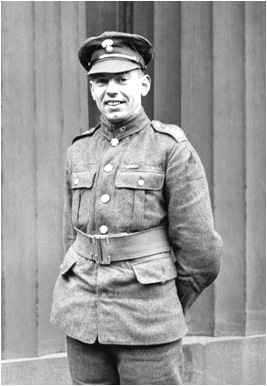
Private John Francis Young Victoria Cross recipient

The award of the VC was announced in the London Gazette on December 14, 1918. Private Young was in Kidderminster, England at the time and received the decoration from King George V at Buckingham Palace in April 1919. That month, he married Ida May Thatcher at St. Mary's Church in Kidderminster. He took his bride back to Canada dying in 1929.

Commemorations / Plaques honouring John Francis Young, VC

Montreal, Canada: A tribute plaque in front of Sergeant Young's Heads Stone in Mount Royal Cemetery was unveiled by The Canadian Grenadier Guards. The Canadian Grenadier Guards' Junior Ranks Mess is named the "John Francis Young Club" in his honour. Past and present serving members of The Canadian Grenadier Guards are required to execute a proper halt, come to attention, each time entering the Jr. Ranks Mess. There is a memorial plaque to him in the CGG Sergeants' mess.

Kidderminster, England: The dedication of a new road name and a paving stone in J.F. Young's memory was unveiled by the Wyre Forest District Council. The ceremony in front took place outside St Mary's and All Saints Church in Kidderminster on September 3, 2018. The ceremony was attended by local dignitaries and veterans' organisations as well as representatives of the Canadian High Commission and the Canadian Grenadier Guards.

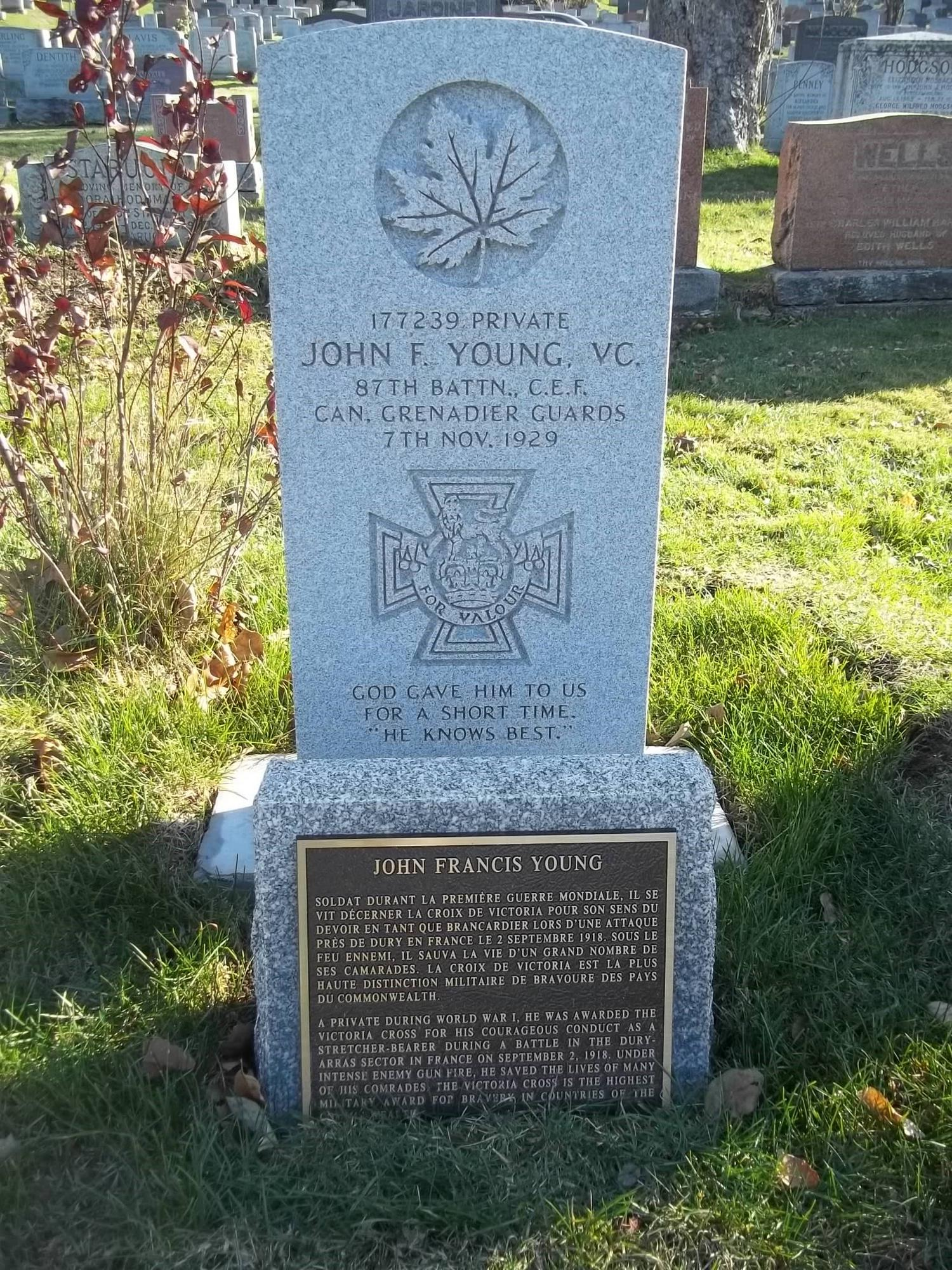
Headstone of Sergeant John Francis Young, VC - 87th Bn Canadian Grenadier Guards located in Mount Royal Cemetery. (Montreal, Canada)

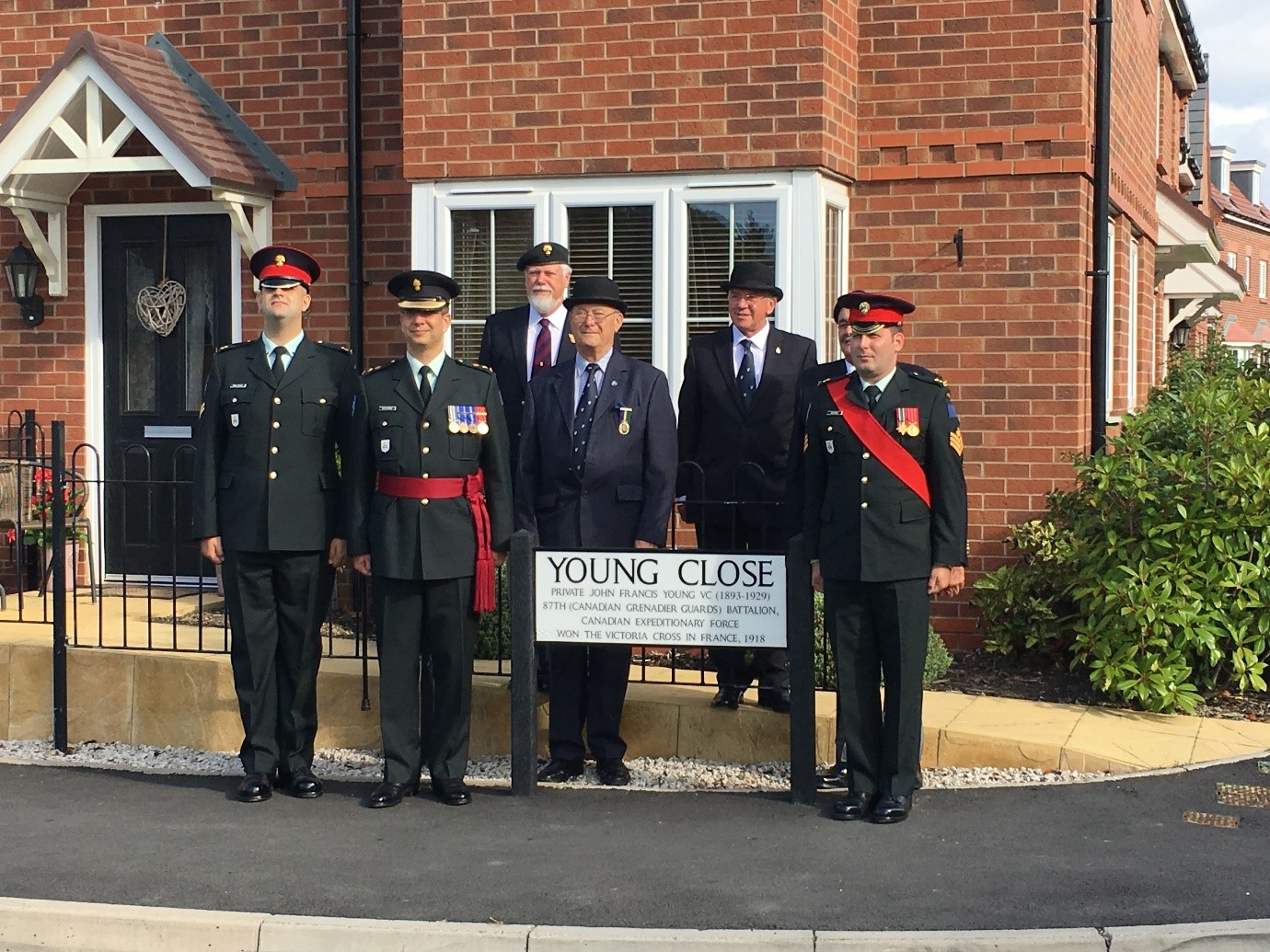
Members of Canadian Grenadier Guards and Kiddermionster City Council unveil the JF Young, VC road on 3rd September, 2018

York, Ontario - Canada: The Canadian Victoria Cross Memorial commissioned by The Mount Pleasant Group is a beautiful memorial dedicated to the 99 men who have been awarded the Victoria Cross while fighting as with the Canadian military. The monument is set out to represent the shapes of the Victoria Cross and a Maple Leaf and occupies the main walkway along the boulevard that runs through York Cemetery. Unveiled in July 2017, the memorial has individual plaques for each VC winner describing their actions of bravery which led to their receiving the highest honour awarded by the British Commonwealth. Also featured is a large replica of the Victoria Cross and an accompanying plaque that describes the history and significance of the award.

Memorial Plaque - near CWGC Dury Crucifix Cemetery, Dury, France: A Memorial Plaque dedicated to Pte John Francis Young and the Town of Drury by the French Major Jean-Marie Dez, MSM was unveiled in 2018. The CWGC Dury Crucifix cemetery is close to the location where J.F. Young won his Victoria Cross and, was begun by Canadian units (mainly the 46th and 47th Battalions) immediately after the capture of the village of Drury. There are 2058 First World War casualties buried in this site. Of these, 1766 are unidentified. This cemetery was designed by G H Goldsmith.

La Voie sacree du Canada, Route939 between Arras and Cambrai, France: A Memorial Round about dedicated to the "Magnificent 7" Canadian soldiers who won their Victoria Cross medals on the same day (Spet 2nd, 1918), in the same sector, including Pte. John Francis Young, VC. Dedicated September 1, 2018, by the municipality of Vis-en-Artois as a result of research completed by Jean-Marie Dez. 7500 Canadian soldiers were killed on this small stretch of road and the memorial is located in the center of the round-about. The project was commissioned by the local French community of Osartis-Marquion and the Department of Pas-de-Calais. The seven CEF members memorialized include: Bellenden Hutchison, Arthur George Knight, William Henry Metcalf, Claude Joseph Patrick Nunney, Cyrus Wesley Peck, Walter Leigh Rayfield, and CGG 87th Bn John Francis Young.

== Gallantry awards ==
The following summarizes additional awards earned and gazetted to members while serving with the 87th Battalion (Canadian Grenadier Guards) CEF.

- Victoria Cross : 1 (Plus one recipient who served with the 87th prior to winning their VC award)
- Knight Bachelor : 1
- Companion of the Order of the Bath : 1
- Companion of the Order of St. Michael and St. George: 3
- Distinguished Service Order and Bar: 3
- Distinguished Service Order: 9
- Officer of the Order of the British Empire: 2
- Member of the Order of the British Empire: 1
- Distinguished Flying Cross and Bar: 1
- Distinguished Flying Cross: 2
- Military Cross and Bar: 5
- Military Cross: 49
- Distinguished Conduct Medal: 20
- Meritorious Service Medal: 12
- Military Medal and Bar: 14
- Military Medal: 168
- Mentioned in Dispatches: 40

== Notable members ==
- Lieutenant Samuel Lewis Honey, VC, served with 87th Bn in 1916 prior to being transferred to 78th Bn CEF
- Major-General Frederick Ross Phelan, CB, DSO, CStJ, MC, VD - Director-General Reserve Army
- Brigadier General Marcel Noel, CBE, ED, Vice Adjutant-General, National Defence Headquarters
- Lieutenant Colonel Maurice Alexander, CMG, KC - Famous Canadian Lawyer, Judge Advocate General and highest ranking Jewish Officer in the CEF.
- Lieutenant Colonel Hercule Barré, LoH, CDG - Founder of 150th Battalion CEF
- Major Gilbert Sutherland Stairs, MC - Lawyer - Rhodes Scholar, Harvard Law School
- Major John S. Lewis, Editor of The Montreal Star (KIA November 18, 1916)
- Major Olivar Joseph-Francois Asselin - Famous Quebec Journalist, philanthropist, Newspaper owner (Le Droit), Quebec Politician, past president of Le Société Saint-Jean-Baptisteand, and founder and sponsor of the 163rd "Poil-aux-Pattes" Battalion CEF
- Major Howard Frank Fogg, Musical Pioneer and Canadian Composer, credited with writing the first original composition for a Canadian film.
- Major Gordon Lewis, No2 Coy Commander, Hockey Player, Won Stanley Cup with Montreal Victorias 1896
- Major Lewis "Lou" Edwin Marsh - Famous Canadian Athlete and Sports Editor (Toronto Star)
- Art Ross, Coach The Canadian Grenadier Guards Hockey Club (1915), Canadian professional ice hockey player
- Captain Henry Scott, Son of Canon Frederick George Scott
- Captain Alfred Craig Hannaford, MC and Bar, (one of only 294 Canadians in the CEF)
- Captain William Stanley Jenkins, DFC and Bar, Canadian Ace with 12 confirmed aerial victories and 1 Balloon attack.
- Lt. Charles Douglas Spittal, Hockey Player, won Stanley Cup with Ottawa Sevens in 1903
- Lieutenant / Sgt Alexander McClintock, DCM, Author "Best o' luck; how a fighting Kentuckian won the thanks of Britain's king", published 1917
- Lieutenant Jimmy Montgomerie, Professional Football Player, Canadian Sports Hall of Fame
- Private William Anson Olgilvie, MM and 2 Bars (One of only 38 Canadians to win 3 MMs)
- Private Whiteford Stewart Dobbs, Founding member of The Canadian War Amps
- Private Albert Nightingale Withey, DCM - Montreal Diocesan Theological College
- Private Maynard Stansfield - Son of MP Joshua Stansfield
- Private George Steven Lam - From British Guiana, One of 20 Black Canadian Infantry Soldiers who fought at The Battle Vimy Ridge with the CEF. Ridge
- Private Arthur John Duff - From Trinidad (British West Indies) KIA 1917 - One of 20 Black Canadian Infantry Soldiers who fought at The Battle of Vimy Ridge and only Canadian Grenadier Guard to be honoured in Trinidad.
- Pte Angus Laforce 1916; Pte Archie Simpson 1917; Pte Harry Barnhart 1917; Pte Stephen Bernard 1917; Pte William Crow; Pte John Deny; Pte Arthur Honyust 1917; and Pte Joe John 1917. 8 First Nations Members who served with the 87th Bn Canadian Grenadier Guards and were sadly all KIA - only 300 CEF First Nations members were KIA during WW1.
- Private Arthur Stanley Bourinot, Canadian Lawyer and Poet - Recipient of the SM (Service Medal of the Order of Canada in 1968
- Lieutenant Colonel Robert Innes, Commanding Officer of 106th Battalion, (Nova Scotia Rifles), CEF - Influential Officer in supporting Canadian Black Soldiers in Infantry Battalions during WW1.
- Major Ernest George Forsbery, Famous Canadian Painter and WW1 War Artist
- Private Johnston, Harold Clifford - Black Canadian Soldier from Bermuda who enlisted with the CEF during WW1
- Corporal Charles Fallon Shearer (Westmount Quebec) - Older brother of three prominent Hollywood Film industry notables including: Douglas Shearer, Norma Shearer, and Athole Shearer. Norma Shearer was the first person to receive five Academy Award nominations for acting and She and her brother Douglas Shearer are the first Oscar-winning siblings.
- Sir (Late Lt.-Col) William Price, businessman, industrialist, officer, and politician; b. 30 Aug. 1867 in Talcahuano, Chile

== Memorials ==
Christ Church Cathedral - Montreal Canada. The cathedral is the regimental church of the Canadian Grenadier Guards and houses The Guards' retired regimental colours.

87th Battalion Vimy Cross CGG Armoury, Montreal Canada - Unveiled on 16 September 1917 by Major general Sir David Watson. The memorial was constructed by Pioneer Sgt C.G. Durrant and bears the names of 217 of the 87th Battalion who were killed or died of wounds during the period of February 1 to June 30, 1917.

Canadian National Vimy Memorial - (1936) Two Hundred and Forty Six "87th Battalion CGG" Soldiers names are inscribed on the outside wall of the monument amongst the names of the 11,285 Canadians killed in France whose final resting place is unknown. King Edward VIII unveiled it on 26 July 1936 in the presence of French President Albert Lebrun and a crowd of over 50,000 people, including 6,200 attendees from Canada. Following an extensive multi-year restoration, Queen Elizabeth II re-dedicated the monument on 9 April 2007 at a ceremony commemorating the 90th anniversary of the battle. 18 original 87th Battalion (CGG) members participated in the 1936 Vimy Ridge pilgrimage. Approximately 22 members of The Canadian Grenadier Guards (and associates) attended the 100th Anniversary in 2017. The 18 CGG Members who participated in the 1936 Vimy Ridge Pilgrimage: Alfred E Bailey, James Boon, James M Dever, Frederick Guthrie, Arthur J Hill, Alfred H Jackson, George A McGee, Thomas A Parkinson, Arthur E Parsons, William Reid, Major Henry H Rolland, Edmund Round, Herbert H Sheel, F.W. Skeates, Dr. Even A. Stewart, Wilfred G. Symons, and Clyde T. Wilson.

87th Battalion Panel - Menin Gate Ypres. Ypres, Belgium - (1927) - 26 Members of the 87th Bn CGG are remembered at this memorial. The memorial is a covered archway with a bridge over the moat that surrounds the city. Inside, and on the stairwells on either side, there are panels for the names of the 56,000 soldiers, approximately 6,983 Canadians, without known graves. When the memorial was inaugurated in 1926 the Brigadier who gave the opening speech addressed those that had no grave to mourn and said "he is not missing, he is here". The 87th Battalion (Canadian Grenadier Guards) have a panel (Panel 24 - 26 - 28 - 30) dedicated to the memories of Lieutenant G.E. Morris, Sgt J.W. Auldjo, Sgt. W. Brereton, Cpl. A. Anderson, Pte. O.J. Beauregard, Pte. C. Bell, Pte I. Breaux, Pte. J. Buckley, Pte. J.J.M. Calvey, Pte. N.E. Combes, Pte. R.S. Deuel, Pte. J.C. Donaghy, Pte. A. Donahue, Pte. A.J. Duff, Pte. A. Hardman, Pte. T.R. Haward, Pte. C.J. Huntley, Pte. W.F. Hurry, Pte. J. Joe, Pte. P.J. Joyce, Pte E.J. McGann, Pte. E.A. Merkley, Pte. G. Munroe, Pte. J.E. Orr, Pte. F.P. Seymour, Pte. R. D. West, Pte. E.V. Wood

Two German Field Guns - the First World War Memorial Site on the Plains of Abraham, Plains of Abraham, Quebec City, QC - (2019) - Two 7.7 cm Field guns captured by the 87th Battalion (Canadian Grenadier Guards) on September 27, 1918, southwest of Bourlon during the Battle of the Canal-du-Nord and Cambria. with dedication plaque were unveiled as a collection of 7 artillery pieces captured by the 13th (one) and 42nd (two) Bns (perpetuated by the Royal Highlanders of Canada, 22nd Bn (one) perpetuated by the Royale 22e Regiment, and the 87th (two) perpetuated by CGG, and the 60th Bn (one) perpetuated by The Victoria Rifles of Canada. The site was dedicated on Remembrance Day, 11 November 2019.

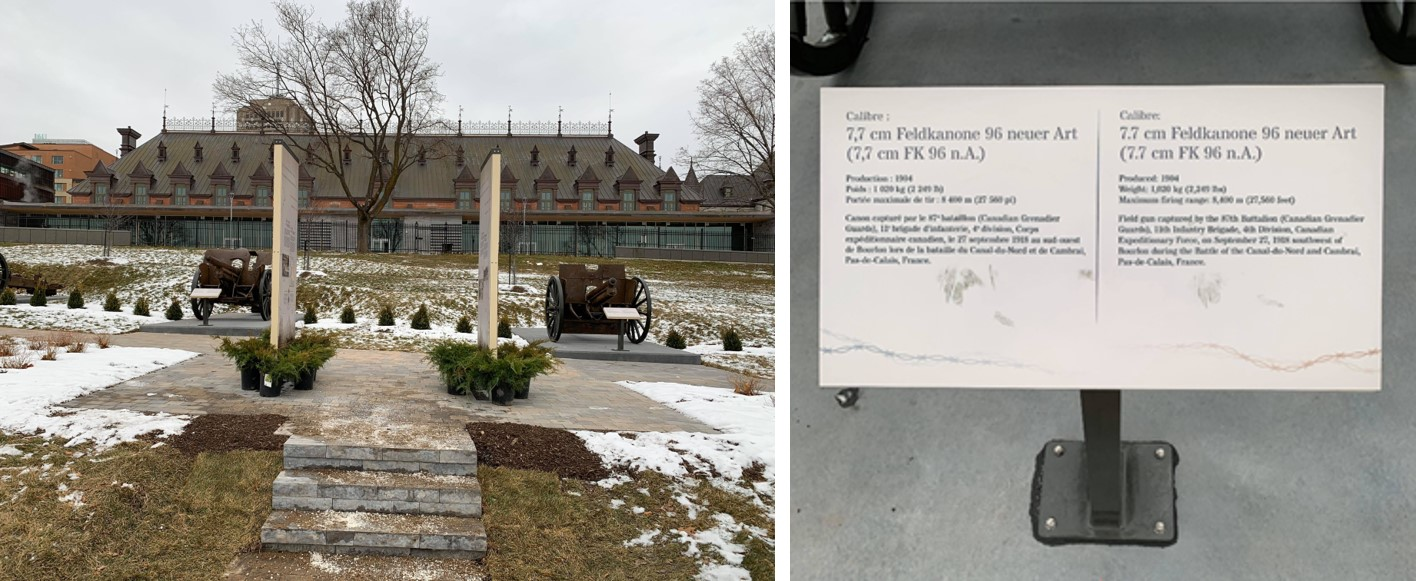
Two German field artillery guns captured by The 87th Battalion, (The Canadian Grenadier Guards) on 27th September, 1918 and displayed as part of the First World War Memorial on The Plains of Abraham, Quebec

Alter Frontal - St Paul's Cathedral, London, England - (1919) - The Frontal was used for the first time on Sunday 6 July 1919, at the national service of thanksgiving for peace at the end of the war in the presence of the King and Queen and many of the 138 soldiers from the UK, Canada, South Africa and Australia who had made it. Pte Edward Hodder represented the 87th Battalion (CGG).

Memorial Brass Tablet - Cathedral of the Holy Trinity, Quebec City, Canada - (1935) - In memory of Lieutenant James William Williams, son of Lennox Waldron Williams, Bishop of Quebec. Lt. Williams was killed on November, 18th, 1916 during the Battle of the Somme.

Memorial Window - Chapel, Montreal Diocesan Theological College, Montreal, Canada' - (1935) - Memorial stained glass windows created by Charles William Kelsey. The window remembers Albert Withney, D.C.M. who was killed in Amiens on the 8th of August, 1918

Bell Telephone Company Memorial Plaque, Montreal, Canada - (1929) - Bell Canada Building at 1050, Côte du Beaver-Hall, Montréal. The Memortial is flanked by the logo of the Bell Telephone Company of Canada. The Memorial celebrates four 87th Bn Canadian Grenadier Guards members - Captain Harry Sare, 177252 Pte J.C. MacFarlane, 177199 Pte W.N. Rumsey, and 177277 Pte W.J. Simmons.

Concordia University Road of Remembrance, Montreal West, Canada - (1922) - 37 trees are planted in as a "Road of Remembrance" for the 37 graduates of Loyola College who fought and died during World War 1. One of 37 trees is dedicated to the memory of a Canadian Grenadier Guards Alumni of Loyola College who fell in 1915.

McGill University Book of Remembrance, Montreal, Canada - (1926) - McGill University commissioned the first book of Remembrance, known as the McGill Honour Roll, listing the names of close to 400 staff, student and faculty who lost their lives during the First World War. A total of 26 Members of The Canadian Grenadier Guards are remembered, biographic, and highlighted.

Royal Bank of Canada, Montreal, Canada - (1928) - The Royal Bank of Canada built its new headquarters at 360 St James St W in 1928 (the tallest building in the British Empire at the time), the bank honoured its employees who had died in World War One. The names of 4 Canadian Grenadier Guards are remembered. Pte L. Porter, Sergeant A.S. Hill, L/Cpl J. Glass, and Pte L.V. Garneau (M.M.).

Bank of Montreal - The Honour Roll of the Members, Montreal, Canada - (1928) - The Bank of Montreal is the oldest bank in Canada (founded in 1817). The Montreal main branch at 119 rue Saint-Jacques contains Tributes to the fallen employees of three banks (Bank of Montreal, The Merchants Bank of Canada, and Molsons Bank). 8 87th Battalion Canadian Grenadier Guards are remembered. (Sgt Devon S. Bailly, Captain David Jellet Barker, Lt. Horrace Yeomans Carroll, Cpl Gerald Federick Kennedy, Lt. George Gordon Laberee, Captain John Reginald Wallace MID, Pte Arthur E.S. Olding (POW), and Captain Errol V. Hall (C.S.E.F.)

Port Hope Cenotaph and The Honour Roll, Port Hope, Ontario, Canada - (1926) - The granite cenotaph was originally erected in 1926 by the Col. Arthur Williams Chapter of the Imperial Order Daughters of the Empire (I.O.D.E.). On the front are inscribed the names of the local men who died in the Great War and remembers 8 Canadian Grenadier Guards who were KIA while part of the 87th Bn. (Pte F. Arkless, Pte C Clark, Pte A.R. Currie, Pte L.T. Godman, Pte D.J.C. Hinton, Pte J. Johnston, Pte W.N. Lownie, Pte C.H. Staples)

Lt. S.G. Hobday, DCM family Brass Plaque, St Michael the Archangel Church, East Sussex, England - (1919) - The brass plaque memorializes Lt. S.G. Hobday (who served with the Canadian Grenadier Guards and won a DCM) and his brother.

City of Sherbrooke, Quebec Monument, (1926) - The Sherbrooke WWI memorial was designed by Mr. G. W. Hill of Montreal, Quebec with bronze figures cast in Belgium and granite from the Stanstead district. It was unveiled on November 7, 1926. The bronze Memorial tablet lists 249 names, including those of 87th Battalion Members Lt. G.E. Morris, Private William Charles Worster

Royal Canadian Legion Branch 6, Owen Sound - Ontario, (1960s) - The CGG 87th Battalion display located in the Owen Sound Royal Canadian Branch No6 was donated by The Reverend Oliver Walter Holmes. It contains a Family made needle point and badges of the Canadian Grenadier Guards. In 2021, a plaque was presented on behalf of The Canadian Grenadier Guards Museum (Donated by Lieutenant Michael Hayes-Rivet, (Ret.)).

Cenotaph Memorial, Port of Spain, Trinidad, (1924) - "The Memorial is of Portland stone and bronze, with a set of four granite steps around the base constructed on a solid circular concrete foundation about eighteen feet across. Standing squarely on the granite steps is the massive base of the column, let into which are the bronze panels engraved with the names of the fallen, some 168 in number." Private Arthur John Duff 144504 is the only Canadian Grenadier Guard commemorated on the Cenotaph and in Trinidad.

Kahnawake War Memorial, Kahnawake, Quebec, (1998) - "The Kahnawake cenotaph is adorned with a Cross. There is a howitzer on top and plaques on the front in tribute to the individuals who lost their lives in the course of World War I, World War II and the Korean War. Plaques on each side of the monument honors the Mohawks who served in the Armed Forces of Canada and the United-States. The monument rests on a cement base while flag poles and light standards are on the base as well but behind the cenotaph. The number 219 representing Branch 219 of the Royal Canadian Legion and is located inside a fenced area, across the street from St. Francis Xavier Church, in Kahnawake, Québec." One of only 300 aboriginals Killed in action during WW1, Private Angus Laforce 145383 is the only First Nations Canadian Grenadier Guard commemorated on the Cenotaph.

Williamsburg War Memorial, Williamsburg, New Brunswick, (1930) - The Williamsburg War Memorial is dedicated to WW1 soldiers from the region that became casualties and memorializes Private William Ingles Fullarton 793960 of the 87th Battalion, Canadian Grenadier Guards.

Ormstown WW1 Memorial Arch, Ormstown, Quebec, (1924) - The Ormstown Quebec Memorial Arch celebrates the soldiers WW1 who fell from the area and contains the name of Pte John Erskine Orr 177906 of the 87th Battalion, Canadian Grenadier Guards.

East Clifton QC WW1 Memorial, East Clifton, Quebec, (1923) - The East Clifton QC Memorial captures several Canadian Grenadier Guards who fell from the area and contains the names of two CGG soldiers of the 87th and 14th Battalions, Canadian Grenadier Guards.; Sgt. George Edwin Thompson, M.M.+ BAR, 87TH. BATT., and Pte. John Frederick Parkinson 87TH BATT.

Mural of Honour - The Military Museums, Calgary, Alberta Canada, (2015) - The Mural of Honourees captures at least one Canadian Grenadier Guard (Lieutenant Reginald Eric Rex Binmore) who fell during the Battle of Arras in 1918 while fighting with Canadian tanks.

L'Anneau de la Mémoire ("The Ring of Memory" or "Ring of Remembrance"), Notre-Dame-de-Lorette France, (2014) - a World War I memorial in Ablain-Saint-Nazaire, France. Designed by Philippe Prost and inaugurated on 11 November 2014, the 96th anniversary of Armistice Day, the memorial honors the 576,606 soldiers of forty different nationalities who died at Nord-Pas-de-Calais. Lieutenant David Jellet Barker (87th Battalion Canadian Grenadier Guards) is commemorated with a plaque as part of this memorial.

The Crusader - Memorial to Captain David Jellet Barker, Picton, Ontario, Canada' - (1925) - Stained Glass Window – commissioned by his parents, David and Rose Barker, in the Anglican Church of St. Mary Magdelene, Picton, Ontario.

== See also ==
- The Canadian Grenadier Guards
- List of infantry battalions in the Canadian Expeditionary Force
