= Thomas Jenkins =

Thomas Jenkins may refer to:

- Thomas Jenkins (bishop) (1871–1955), missionary bishop of the Episcopal Church
- Thomas Jenkins (footballer) (1877–?), Rhyl F.C. and Wales international footballer
- Thomas Jenkins (headmaster), Shakespeare's headmaster
- Thomas Jenkins (Medal of Honor) (1831–?), American sailor and Medal of Honor recipient in the American Civil War
- Thomas Jenkins (rugby league), Australian rugby league footballer
- Thomas Jenkins (Wisconsin politician, born 1801) (1801–1866), member of the Legislature of the Wisconsin Territory and of the Wisconsin State Assembly
- Thomas Jenkins (Wisconsin politician, born 1832) (1832–1911), two-term member of the Wisconsin State Assembly
- Thomas A. Jenkins (1880–1959), U.S. congressman from Ohio
- Thomas Lowten Jenkins (1812–1867), English rower and barrister
- Thomas Jenkins (antiquary) (1722–1798), English antiquarian in Rome

== See also ==
- Bert Jenkins or Thomas Bertie Jenkins (1885–1943), Welsh rugby union and rugby league footballer
- Edward Jenkins (priest) or Thomas Edward Jenkins (1902–1996), Anglican priest
- Tom Jenkins (disambiguation)
- Tommy Jenkins (born 1947), English footballer
- Tommy Jenkins (Australian footballer) (1902–1979), Australian rules footballer
- Jenkins (name)
