= Albert Jenkins =

Albert Jenkins may refer to:

- Albert G. Jenkins (1830–1864), Brigadier General (Confederacy), American Civil War
- Albert Jenkins (footballer) (1861–1940), English footballer who formed Doncaster Rovers in 1879
- Albert Jenkins (rugby union) (1895–1953), Welsh international rugby union player
- Bert Jenkins (1885–1943), Welsh rugby league footballer who played in the 1900s, 1910s and 1920s for Great Britain, Wales, and Wigan

== See also ==
- Al Jenkins (disambiguation)
