= Jackie Jenkins =

Jackie Jenkins may refer to:

- Jackie "Butch" Jenkins (1937–2001), American actor
- Jackie Jenkins (boxer) (1913–2003), New Zealand champion amateur boxer
- Jackie Jenkins (fl. 1990s), alleged alias of British writer Vanessa Bishop

== See also ==
- Jack Jenkins (disambiguation)
- John Jenkins (disambiguation)
