= Harold Jenkins =

Harold Jenkins may refer to:

- Conway Twitty (Harold Lloyd Jenkins, 1933–1993), American rock 'n' roll and country music singer
- Harold Jenkins (footballer) (1902–1981), Welsh footballer
- Harold Jenkins (Shakespeare scholar) (1909–2000)
- Harold Jenkins (nightclub owner) (1890–1967)
- Harold Jenkins, member of Sugarman Gang
- Harold Jenkins, a major antagonist of the Netflix Original Series The Umbrella Academy

== See also ==
- Harry Jenkins (disambiguation)
