= Al Jenkins =

Al Jenkins may refer to:

- Al Jenkins (EastEnders), fictional character from EastEnders
- Al Jenkins (American football) (born 1946), American football player
- Al Jenkins, American boxer on List of U.S. national Golden Gloves heavyweight champions

== See also ==
- Albert Jenkins (disambiguation)
- Allan Jenkins (disambiguation)
