= Paul Jenkins =

Paul Jenkins may refer to:

- Paul Jenkins (actor) (1938–2013), American actor
- Paul Jenkins (barrister) (1954–2018), chief executive of the Treasury Solicitor's Department and Treasury Solicitor
- Paul Jenkins (cricketer) (born 1972), English cricketer
- Paul Jenkins (EastEnders), fictional character from EastEnders
- Paul Jenkins (economist), Canadian economist and Senior Deputy Governor of the Bank of Canada
- Paul Jenkins (painter) (1923–2012), American abstract expressionist painter
- Paul Jenkins (poet), professor of poetry, Hampshire College
- Paul Jenkins (politician) (born 1938), Australian politician
- Paul Jenkins (writer) (born 1965), British comic book writer
- Paul Jenkins, Welsh martial arts fighter, see list of mixed martial artists with the most sanctioned fights
