= Ian Jenkins =

Ian Jenkins may refer to:

- Ian Jenkins (curator) (1953–2020), curator at the British Museum
- Ian Jenkins (figure skater) (born 1962), British figure skater
- Ian Jenkins (politician) (1941–2025), Scottish politician
- Ian Jenkins (Royal Navy officer) (1944–2009), former Surgeon General of the British Armed Forces
- Iain Jenkins (born 1972), former Northern Ireland footballer
