= Ebenezer Evans Jenkins =

English Wesleyan missionary

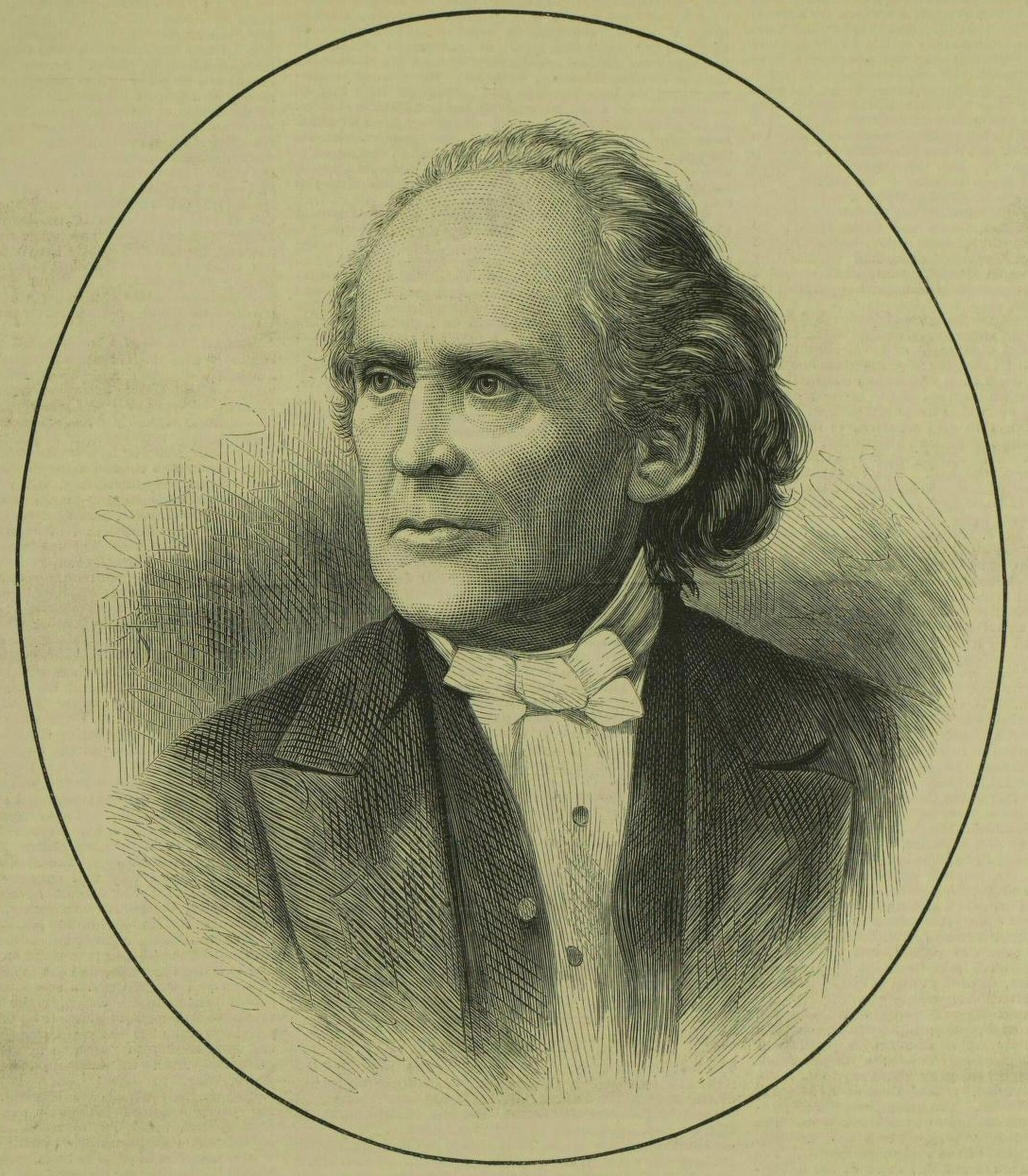
Jenkins in 1880

Ebenezer Evans Jenkins (10 May 1820 – 19 July 1905) was a British Wesleyan Methodist missionary who worked in India and visited the United States of America, China and Japan on official tours of the Wesleyan mission. He established the Royapettah College in Madras.

Jenkins was born in Exeter, the second son of cabinet maker John and his Welsh wife Mary Evans. His parents were Methodists and he was educated at the Exeter Grammar School before becoming a teacher at William Pengelly's school. He then joined the Methodist ministry and was ordained at the Greet Queen Street Wesleyan Chapel on 31 October 1845 and was sent to Madras. He worked at Mannargudi and Nagapatnam before moving to Madras in 1848. He founded the Royapettah school. During the mutiny years he was away in England due to poor health and returned in 1857 to Madras. He became famous as a speaker and preacher and made numerous tours, speaking at the Evangelical Alliance convention in New York 1873 and visited China and Japan. He returned to England and lived in Southport where he died. He was buried in Norwood cemetery.

Jenkins married Eliza Drewett at Madras in 1850 and after her death in 1869 he married Margaret Heald Wood (daughter of Dr. Peter Wood of Southport) in 1871. Margaret died shortly after their son James Heald Jenkins was born. James Heald wrote a memoir on the life of his father. He became a preacher and his son Romilly James Heald Jenkins (1907–1969) became a professor of Byzantine history.

Jenkins`s younger brother David James Jenkins (1824-1891) was a shipowner, and MP for Penryn and Falmouth from 1874 to 1886.
