= Michael Jenkins =

Michael or Mike Jenkins may refer to:

- Michael Jenkins (diplomat) (1936–2013), British diplomat
- Michael Jenkins (director) (1946–2024), Australian writer, producer and director
- Mike Jenkins (poet) (born 1953), Welsh poet and novelist
- Michael Jenkins (sportscaster) (born 1973), Comcast SportsNet
- Michael Jenkins (running back) (born 1976), Canadian Football League
- Mike Jenkins (strongman) (1982–2013), American professional strongman competitor
- Mike Jenkins (wide receiver, born 1974), American football player
- Michael Jenkins (wide receiver) (born 1982), American football
- Mike Jenkins (American football) (born 1985), cornerback
- Michael Jenkins (basketball) (born 1986), American professional basketball player
- Michael Jenkins (athlete) (born 2004), Welsh para-athlete
- Michael Jenkins (Unification Church), president, Unification Church of America
- Michael A. G. Jenkins, co-creator of the Jenkins–Traub algorithm
- Michael Jenkins, victim in the 2023 Rankin County torture incident
- Mike Jenkins, creator of Traxxas, radio-controlled vehicles

== See also ==
- Mick Jenkins (disambiguation)
