= Thomas Jenkins (footballer) =

Welsh footballer

Personal information
- Date of birth: 1877
- Place of birth: Wales

International career
Years	Team	Apps	(Gls)
1902	Wales	1	(0)

Thomas Jenkins (born 1877) was a Welsh international footballer. He was part of the Wales national football team, playing 1 match on 22 February 1902 against Ireland.

== See also ==
- List of Wales international footballers (alphabetical)
