= The Yogurt Connection =

American drug smuggling ring

The Yogurt Connection was a drug smuggling ring that operated out of Indianapolis, Indiana, United States, in the late 1970s and early 1980s. Prosecutors estimated that the gang ran an estimated 250,000 pounds of Colombian, Jamaican and Thai marijuana. Distribution reached into eleven midwestern states and was valued at US$50 million to $100 million, making it the largest known ring of its kind at the time.

== History ==
From their hometown of Indianapolis, Indiana, during 1975, Linda Leary (born April 15, 1931) and her two sons, Richard Heilbrunn (born June 20, 1951) and Paul Heilbrunn (born January 15, 1954), organized a drug smuggling ring that prosecutors called "The Yogurt Connection"—an allusion to the family's YoGo franchise and the French Connection drug trafficking scheme.

Officially, they were selling Dr. Bronner's Natural Castile Soap through a health-food distribution business called Heilbrunn and Friends. Initially the "friends" were North Central High School graduates who set up marijuana sales networks at universities and eventually the wider market.

In addition to their illegal activities, Linda and her sons maintained high profiles and excellent reputations in the community. Paul was a broker and financier. Linda was head of the Indianapolis League of Women Voters, president of the local chapter of the National Council of Jewish Women and a volunteer fund-raiser for the city's new zoo. She also aided inner-city school immunization programs and child care centers in poverty-stricken areas, which a judge noted was "incredibly ironic" that she also flooded the same neighborhoods with marijuana. They made highly visible loans to unknowing recipients, including a local radio station, a Cablevision franchise, and the Indianapolis Dining Guide. Few residents suspected that the same people who played tennis at the club and supported the government initiatives of then-mayor Richard Lugar, could also smuggle illegal drugs.

According to the federal government's indictment of the family, Paul organized the gang and saw to its growth. The Connection moved about 250,000 pounds of marijuana throughout their 12-year operation, estimated to have made $50 to $100 million by the late 80s. Authorities reported that the individuals hired to count money were "told to not bother with $1 bills." Millions of dollars were laundered in offshore accounts and fake companies in the Bahamas and Panama.

More businessman than drug dealer, Paul wore three-piece suits, drove a late-model BMW, frequented the most expensive restaurants and paid in hundred dollar bills. Paul had a reputation for being ruthless, which was evident in September 1975. According to federal prosecutors, Paul was supposed to talk to John Brady Jenkins, an employee and an old friend from North Central High School, about a large debt Jenkins owed the organization. Paul suspected trouble with Jenkins and, rather than meeting with John himself, Paul asked his brother Richard to take his place. Paul was correct; at the meeting, Jenkins pulled a pistol, killed Jerry Fitzgerald, a man who had accompanied Richard and put four bullets into Richard, leaving him for dead. Richard survived the wounds, though later he walked with a pronounced limp.

Jenkins escaped and was eventually captured in a small Canadian town; he hanged himself in a British Columbia jail. According to hearsay, he committed suicide to put an end to threats made on a younger brother, intended to prevent Jenkins from turning government informant. A string of unsolved murders were attributed to the gang, including the 1976 death of Philip Winkler, the son of an Indianapolis oil company executive. None were ever prosecuted.

In 1983, federal agents say they picked up a cocaine distributor who had been fired by Paul. In exchange for a grant of immunity, the man agreed to tell the authorities as much as he knew about the Heilbrunn operation. In the second half of 1985 Linda and her sons fled to Austria after learning a federal grand jury was looking into allegations the Heilbrunns were directing a multi-state smuggling operation. In November 1987, after four years spent gathering evidence, the authorities moved in on the Yogurt Connection with indictments against Leary, her sons and more than 30 other people. Leary and her sons were arrested in May 1989 in Austria.

A 1987 indictment put together by law enforcement charged most of the known participants, but referred to three Michigan residents via aliases: “John Doe" or "the Joker” and two Jane Does, “Tipper and Topper.” The Joker was only known as Paul Heilbrunn's "trusted and valued peer." The indicted were prosecuted and convicted as Heilbrunns were fought extradition in Austria. Of the indicted was James Shedd, who had stored in his barn 40,000 pounds marijuana. He refused both a plea deal and naming the Joker. In early 1989, Michigan FBI agent Greg Stejskal had gained the trust of a Michigan man connected to the ring (his identity still unknown) who identified the joker as James Hill. Hill still lived in Burns Park, MI and owned an ice cream shop by the name of the Lovin’ Spoonful. Like the general upstanding nature of other ring members, the only spot on Hill's record was in 1973 for a minor traffic violation. Hill was arrested by Ann Arbor FBI and taken to Detroit to be arraigned. In October 1990, Hill pleaded guilty, agreed to testify against the Heilbrunns, and admitted to paying the Connection nearly $20 million for over than 100,000 pounds of marijuana. His sentence was lightened for his cooperation to 20 years in prison.

U.S. District Judge Larry J. McKinney sentenced Leary to nine years for conspiracy to possess with intent to distribute marijuana. He sentenced her to a concurrent five-year term for racketeering. Convictions of Richard and Paul followed.

== Release dates ==
The family members have been released from federal prisons:

- Paul Bruce Heilbrunn, DOC Number 03367-028, released April 15, 2003
- Richard S. Heilbrunn, DOC Number 03368-028, released September 23, 1994
- Linda Leary, DOC Number 03366-028, released June 16, 1992

== See also ==
- George Jung
- Illegal drug trade
- International Drug Control
- Wonderland Gang
- Black Tuna Gang
