= Richard Jenkins (disambiguation) =

Richard Jenkins (born 1947) is an American actor.

Richard Jenkins may also refer to:

- Richard L. Jenkins (1903–1991), American child psychiatrist
- Richard Jenkins (engineer) (born 1977), British engineer
- Richard Jenkins (MP) (1785–1853), Member of Parliament for Shrewsbury
- Richard Jenkins (RCMP) interrogated Abdullah Khadr while he was in a secret prison in Pakistan
- Richard Lewis Jenkins (1815–1883), New South Wales politician
- Richard Jenkins (sociologist) (born 1952)

== See also ==
- Richard Jenkyns (1782–1854), British academic administrator and Dean of Wells
- Richard Burton (1925–1984), Welsh actor whose birth name was Richard Walter Jenkins Jr.
