= Robert Jenkins =

Robert Jenkins may refer to:

- Robert Jenkins (American football) (born 1963), American NFL player
- Robert Jenkins (Australian politician) (1814–1859), member of the New South Wales Legislative Council
- Robert Jenkins (master mariner) (fl. 1731–1745), English master mariner who sparked the War of Jenkins' Ear
- Robert Jenkins (Pennsylvania politician) (1769–1848), United States congressman from Pennsylvania
- Robert Jenkins (British politician) (1900–1978), British Conservative member of parliament for Dulwich, 1951–1964
- Robert Harold Jenkins (1873–1939), Canadian politician
- Robert H. Jenkins Jr. (1948–1969), U.S. Marine Corps Medal of Honor recipient, killed in action in Vietnam
- Robert Thomas Jenkins (1881–1969), Welsh historian and academic
- Bob Jenkins (American football) (1923–2001), American football halfback
- Robert John Jenkins Jr. (born 1966), computer professional
- Bob Jenkins (1947–2021), American sports announcer
- Bob Jenkins, character in Almost Normal
- Charles Robert Jenkins (1940–2017), sometimes known as Robert Jenkins, U.S. soldier who defected to North Korea; husband of Hitomi Soga
