= John Jenkins (rugby) =

Wales international rugby league footballer

Personal information
- Full name: John T. Jenkins

Playing information

Rugby union
Club
Years	Team	Pld	T	G	FG	P
	Llwynypia RFC

Rugby league
- Position: Stand-off, Scrum-half
Club
Years	Team	Pld	T	G	FG	P
1906–10	Warrington	99	31	0	0	93
Representative
Years	Team	Pld	T	G	FG	P
1909	Wales	1	0	0	0	0

John "Jack" T. Jenkins was a Welsh rugby union and professional rugby league footballer who played in the 1900s and 1910s. He played club level rugby union (RU) for Llwynypia RFC and representative level rugby league (RL) for Wales, and at club level for Warrington, as a stand-off or scrum-half.

== Playing career ==
=== International honors ===
Jack Jenkins won a cap for Wales (RL) while at Warrington in 1909.

=== Notable tour matches ===
Jack Jenkins played scrum-half in Warrington's 10–3 victory over Australia in the 1908–09 Kangaroo tour of Great Britain tour match during the 1908–09 season at Wilderspool Stadium, Warrington, Saturday 14 November 1908, in front of a crowd of 5,000, due to the strikes in the cotton mills, the attendance was badly affected, the loss of earnings meant that some fans could not afford to watch the first tour by the Australian rugby league team, and played and scored a try in the 8–8 draw with Australia in the 1908–09 Kangaroo tour of Great Britain tour match during the 1908–09 season at Wilderspool Stadium, Warrington, Monday 8 February 1909, in front of a crowd of 7,000.

== Personal life ==
Jenkins' son Griff Jenkins, was also a rugby league footballer. He played for Warrington in the 1930s, and was appointed as Oldham's first ever coach in 1954.
