= Chris Jenkins (powerlifter) =

Welsh powerlifter

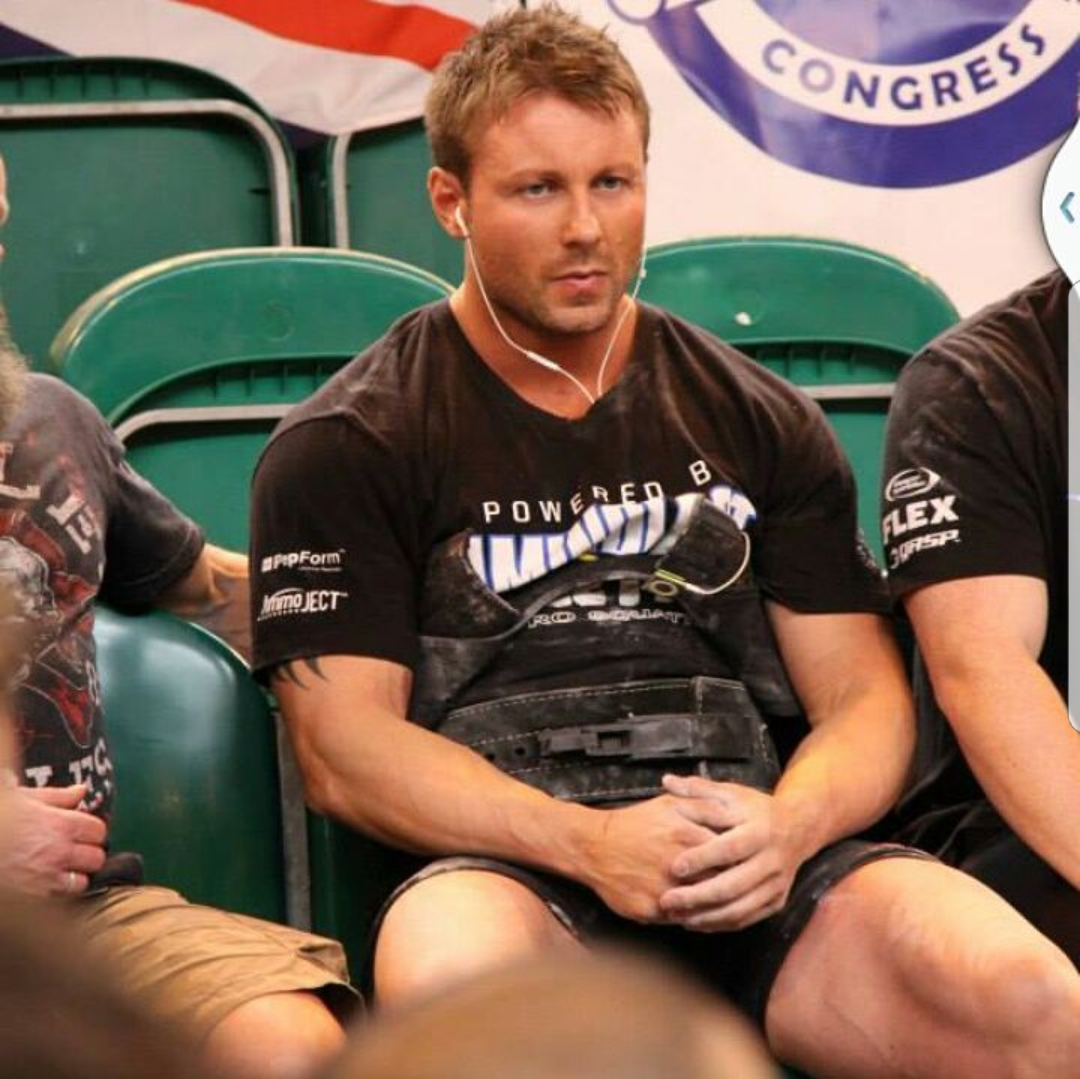
- Born: Neath, Wales
- Nationality: Welsh
- Height: 5 ft 9 in (1.75 m)
- Weight: 90 kg (198 lb; 14 st 2 lb) (198LB)
- Style: Powerlifting, Olympic Weightlifting.
- Last updated on: 21 July 2010

Christopher Jenkins is a Welsh powerlifter and strongman. He is a former junior World powerlifting champion and holds Welsh, British, European and World records in the powerlifts. Jenkins has been described as one of the greatest junior powerlifters of all time.

== Early life ==
Chris Jenkins was born in South Wales and was a pupil at Ysgol Gyfun Gwyr. Jenkins began weight training at age 11 to improve his running at school.

Chris Jenkins was coached in his teens, by Welsh Weightlifter Mike Brown at his private home gym in Margam, Port Talbot. Brown also coached double Commonwealth Weightlifting medalist Gareth Hives.

Competition record

Powerlifting Competition Record British Senior National Championships
1st	2000 (18–19) 82.5 kg teenage division
1st	2001 junior 90 kg division
1st	2002 junior 90 kg division
1st	2003 open & junior 90 kg division
1st	2004 open & junior 90 kg division
1st	2005 open 90 kg division
1st	2006 open 90 kg division
1st	2007 open 90 kg division
1st	2009 open 82.5 kg division
1st	2011 open 100 kg division
1st	2012 open 100 kg division
1st	2013 open 90 kg division
1st	2014 open 90 kg division

World Powerlifting Congress World Championships
1st	2001 Junior 90 kg division
3rd	2002 Junior 90 kg division
1st	2003 junior 90 kg division
2nd	2004 open 90 kg division
1st	2006 open 90 kg division
1st	2008 open 82.5 kg division
1st	2009 open 90 kg division
1st	2018 open 82.5 kg division

Mr Olympia Pro Invitational contest
1st	2011 open 100 kg division
3rd	2012 open 100 kg division
1st	2018 open 82.5 kg division
1st	2019 open 82.5 kg division

== Powerlifting career ==
Chris Jenkins competed in his first powerlifting contest in 1999, winning the 17-19 teenage 90kg division and breaking the Welsh deadlift record with 252.5kg.

Jenkins competed in his first British powerlifting championships in 2000, winning the 18/19 teenage class, breaking the British and European senior deadlift record of 282.5 kg at 82.5 kg bodyweight.

In 2001 he won his first junior world title in Dallas, Texas. Jenkins holds the junior world record deadlift of 331 kg at 90 kg bodyweight and has been described as one of the biggest talents in British Powerlifting.

Jenkins also holds a WR deadlift in the International Strength Association with 352.5 kg (775.5 lbs) set at 90 kg (198 lbs) bodyweight in Fort Worth, Texas in 2007.

Chris Jenkins is widely regarded as one of the greatest pound-for-pound strength athletes Wales has ever produced.

In Strongman Jenkins is a three time winner of Wales Strongest Man U90kg and is coached by former Weightlifter and Olympian Natasha Perdue.

=== Best equipped lifts ===
- Squat - 821 lbs (~372.5 kg) -2006 BPC British Powerlifting championships. Maidstone, Kent. Age 25, Open division. Multiply, 90kg class, weight 88.2kg.
- Bench press - 534 lbs (~235.5 kg) -2009 WPC World Powerlifting championships. Bournemouth, England. Age 29, Open division. Multi-ply, 90kg class, weight 89.9kg.
- Deadlift - 815.71 lbs (~370kg kg) -BPC 2008 UK open championships. Folkestone, England. Age 27, Open division. Multi-ply, 90k class, weight 89.7kg.

=== Other lifts ===
Axle Press - 363 lbs, (~165 kg) 2013 Giants live contest, Bala, North Wales.

Axle Press - 377 lbs, (~171 kg) Welsh Open record, previously held by Gavin Bilton -375 lbs, (~170 kg) 2024, Aberavon shopping centre.

Yoke carry - 800 lbs, (~362.5 kg) 2021 Official Strongman Games, Daytona Beach, Florida.
