= Henry Jenkins (disambiguation) =

Henry Jenkins is a media scholar at USC.

Henry Jenkins may also refer to:

- Henry Jenkins (longevity claimant) (died 1670), English supercentenarian claimant
- Henry Jenkins (MP) for Boroughbridge
- Harry Jenkins (Henry Alfred Jenkins, born 1952), Australian politician

== See also ==
- Harry Jenkins (disambiguation)
- Henry Jenkin, engineering professor
