= Billy Jenkins (Australian footballer) =

Australian rules footballer, born 1914

Personal information
- Full name: William Morgan Jenkins
- Born: 4 June 1914
- Died: 9 October 2001 (aged 87)
- Height: 168 cm (5 ft 6 in)
- Weight: 73 kg (161 lb)

Playing career^{1}
Years	Club	Games (Goals)
1938	Richmond	3 (0)
- ^{1} Playing statistics correct to the end of 1938.

William Morgan Jenkins (4 June 1914 – 9 October 2001) was an Australian rules footballer who played with Richmond in the Victorian Football League (VFL).
