= William Jenkins (New Zealand) =

- Born: 13 September 1813; Isle of Sheppey, Kent, England
- Died: 26 September 1902 (aged 89)
- Occupations: Sailor, whaler, accommodation-house keeper, farmer, market gardener, horse-trainer, jockey
- Known for: Early New Zealand coastal whaling and settler economy activities

William Jenkins (13 September 1813–26 September 1902) was a New Zealand sailor, whaler, accommodation-house keeper, farmer, market gardener, horse-trainer and jockey. He was born in Isle of Sheppey in Kent, England on 13 September 1813.
