= James Jenkins =

James Jenkins may refer to:

== Sports ==
- James Lindley Jenkins (born 1954), English footballer
- James Jenkins (American football) (born 1967), American football player
- Pee Wee Jenkins (James Edward Jenkins, 1923–2002), American baseball player

== Other fields ==
- James Jenkins (Cornish scholar) (died 1710)
- James Jenkins (Methodist) (1764–1847), circuit rider
- James Graham Jenkins (1834–1921), U.S. federal judge
- James J. Jenkins (1923–2012), American psychologist
- James Allister Jenkins, Canadian–American mathematician
- James Christopher Jenkins (lawyer) (born 1939), British lawyer

== See also ==
- Jim Jenkins (footballer) (1897–1983), Australian rules footballer
- Jim Jinkins (born 1953), American animator, creator of the television series PB&J Otter and Doug
