= John G. Manuel =

Canadian World War I flying ace

- Born: John Gerald Manuel; 29 March 1893; Winnipeg, Manitoba
- Died: 10 June 1918 (aged 25)
- Burial place: Y Farm Military Cemetery, Bois-Grenier, Nord, France
- Military career
- Allegiance: George V
- Branch: Royal Naval Air Service
- Units: 19th Alberta Dragoons; Canadian Field Artillery; No. 12N Squadron RNAS; No. 10N Squadron RNAS/210 Squadron RAF
- Awards: Distinguished Service Cross, Distinguished Flying Cross

Captain John Gerald Manuel DSC DFC (29 March 1893 – 10 June 1918) was a Canadian First World War flying ace, officially credited with 13 victories. He was the son of George Morton and Edith Juliet Paget Manuel (née Imlach).

Manuel originally began service with the Canadian Field Artillery after enlisting on 27 November 1914. His attestation papers offer a few details about him. He was unmarried, a civil engineer, and belonged to a militia unit, the Alberta Dragoons. His next of kin was George M. Manuel, relationship unnoted. Medical records show him with dark hair, gray eyes, medium complexion, and standing five feet six inches tall. Neither his weight nor his build was given.

Manuel switched to the Royal Naval Air Service in March 1917. After training, he spent a short period in 12 Naval Squadron. On 12 August 1917, he was posted to 10 Naval Squadron as a Sopwith Camel pilot. Nine days later, he drove a German Albatros D.V down out of control, and destroyed another five minutes later. A month later, on 21 September, Manuel destroyed a German reconnaissance two-seater. Another D.V fell under his guns on 15 November 1917. He then received the Distinguished Service Cross on 19 December to close out his year.

Manuel scored his fifth victory on 18 February, destroying another D.V to become an ace. He drove another down out of control the next day. He would continue to score until his final two wins on 9 June 1918. Not even a hand wound caused by an exploding Very pistol during a patrol on 9 May 1918 seemed to phase him, as he quickly returned from hospital to fly combat.

On 10 June 1918, the day after his final victories, Manuel fatally collided with rookie pilot F. C. Dodd. His final tally was ten enemy airplanes destroyed (including one shared with William Stanley Jenkins), and three driven down out of control.

== Text of citations ==
Distinguished Service Cross

Flt. Sub-Lieut. John Gerald Manuel, R.N.A.S. For conspicuous gallantry and devotion to duty in air fights and bombing raids, particularly on 26 September 1917, when he attacked alone the Abeele Aerodrome, dropping his bombs from about 1,500 feet with good results. A machine gun then opened fire on him, but he dived down low and silenced it by firing fifty rounds from his machine gun.

Distinguished Flying Cross

Mentioned in Despatches 1 January 1919
