= Tom Jenkins =

Tom Jenkins may refer to:

- Tom Jenkins (baseball) (1898–1979), American baseball player
- Tom Jenkins (golfer) (born 1947), American golfer
- Tom Jenkins (teacher) (1797–1859), Britain's first black school teacher
- Tom Jenkins (trade unionist) (1920–2012), Welsh trade union leader
- Tom Jenkins (wrestler) (1872–1957), American professional wrestler

== See also ==
- Tommy Jenkins (born 1947), former English footballer
- Tommy Jenkins (Australian footballer) (1902–1979), Australian rules footballer
- Thomas Jenkins (disambiguation)
