= George Jenkins =

George Jenkins may refer to:

- George Jenkins (Australian politician) (1878–1957)
- George Jenkins (musician) (1911–1967), American jazz drummer who worked with artists such as Jimmy Bryant and who led the band George Jenkins and the Tune Twisters
- George Jenkins (soccer) (1904–1985), Canadian soccer player
- George Jenkins (born 1973), American dentist and motivational speaker of The Three Doctors
- George A. Jenkins (1818–1896), Wisconsin state senator
- George C. Jenkins (1908–2007), American production designer
- George Henry Jenkins (1843–1911), Australian public servant
- George J. Jenkins (1927–2002), politician in the Legislative Assembly of New Brunswick
- George Neil Jenkins (1914–2007), British professor of oral physiology
- George P. Jenkins (1914–2009), American business executive
- George W. Jenkins (1907–1996), founder of Publix

== See also ==
- George W. Jenkins High School, a high school in Lakeland, Florida
