= John Jenkins (penmanship) =

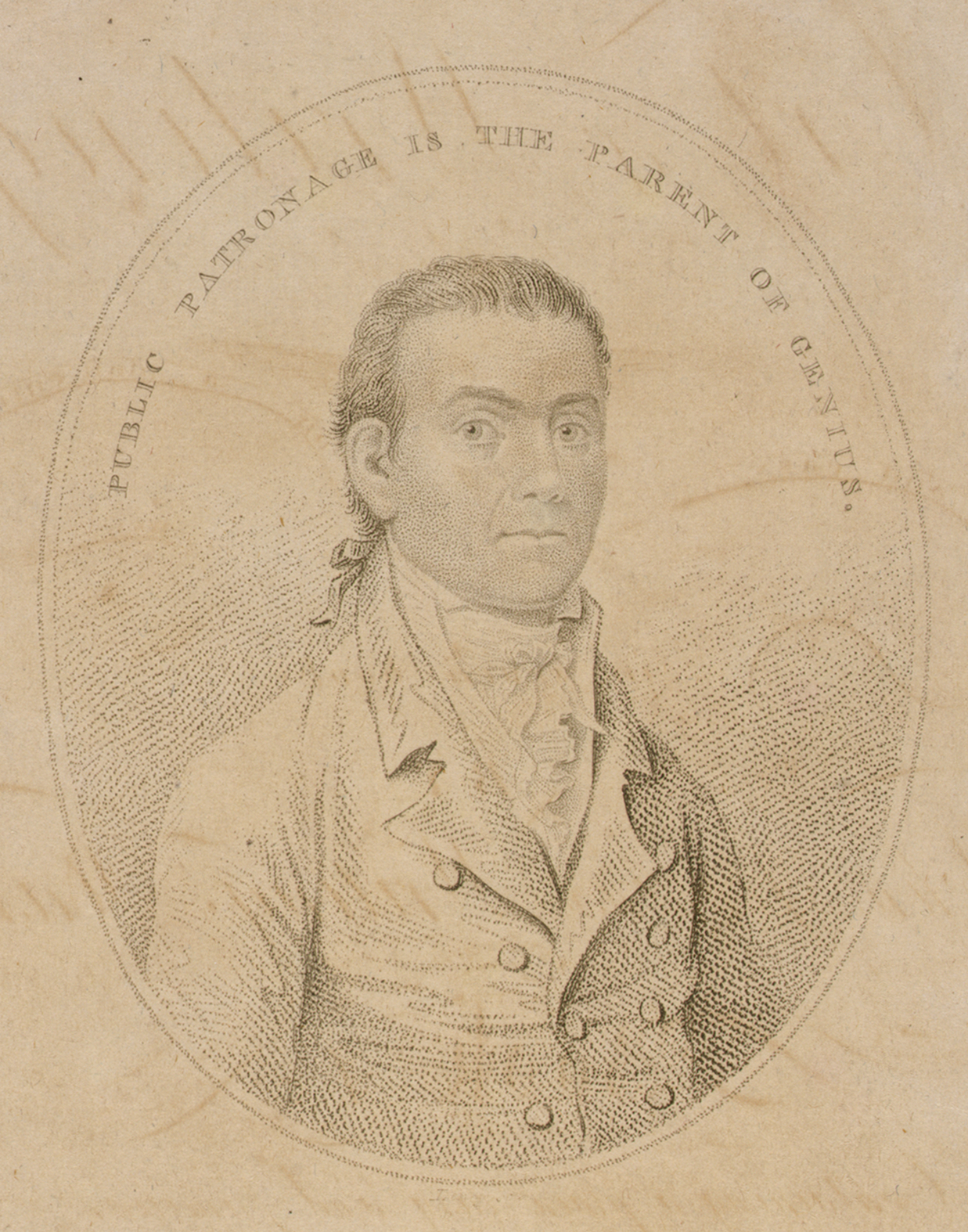
John Jenkins engraving in the frontispiece of The Art of Writing

John Jenkins (1755–1822) was an American schoolteacher who wrote the first entirely American book on penmanship, The Art of Writing, Reduced to a Plain and Easy System, first printed in 1791 by Isaiah Thomas. It consisted of 32 pages of text, four plates of engraved writing samples and a frontispiece. It was recommended by John Adams, Benjamin Franklin and John Hancock. Jenkins' system became the standard in America, and a revised second edition was published in 1813 by Flagg & Gould.

== See also ==
- Platt Rogers Spencer, who created a later writing system
