= Joseph Jenkins =

Joseph or Joe Jenkins may refer to:

- Joseph Jenkins (diarist) (1818–1898), Welsh-Australian diarist
- Joseph Jenkins (pastor) (1859–1929), Calvinistic Methodist preacher
- Joe Clint Jenkins (1895–1959), American politician
- Joseph John Jenkins (1811–1885), English engraver and watercolour painter
- Joseph Wiley Jenkins (1901–1950), African-American pharmacist, resident of Jenkins House (West Palm Beach, Florida)
- Joseph Willcox Jenkins (1928–2014), American composer, professor of music, and musician
- Joe Jenkins (baseball) (1890–1974), American baseball player
- Joe Jenkins (dancer), American dancer
- Joe Jenkins (rugby union), Anglo-Welsh rugby union player
- Joe Jenkins (scholar), Kahlil Gibran scholar
