= Mallinson baronets =

Baronetcy in the Baronetage of the United Kingdom

The Mallinson Baronetcy, of Walthamstow in the County of Essex, is a title in the Baronetage of the United Kingdom. It was created on 6 July 1935 for William Mallinson. He was a Justice of the Peace for Essex. The second Baronet was a Deputy Lieutenant of Essex.

The title is currently held by Dr. James Mallinson, a scholar of Sanskrit and Yoga, who is the Boden Professor of Sanskrit at the University of Oxford.

== Mallinson baronets, of Walthamstow (1935) ==
- Sir William Mallinson, 1st Baronet (1854–1936)
- Sir William James Mallinson, 2nd Baronet (1879–1944)
- Sir (William) Paul Mallinson, 3rd Baronet (1909–1989)
- Sir William John Mallinson, 4th Baronet (1942–1995)
- Sir (William) James Mallinson, 5th Baronet (born 1970)

The heir presumptive is the present holder's cousin Jonathan Justin Stuart Mallinson (born 1971).
