= Sugarman Gang =

- Years active: c.1900-1910
- Territory: Leeds, London
- Ethnicity: English, Jews
- Criminal activities: burglary

The Sugarman Gang was a burglary ring which operated between Leeds and London, England, during the early 1900s until its breakup by Scotland Yard in 1910.

Stolen goods and property would be passed from jewelry auctioneer William Mallinson to Samuel Sugarman, the proprietor of a remnant business. A known fence in the local underworld, Sugarman was known to sell stolen goods including jewelry, watches, drapes, clothing and clocks.

A Detective Ernest Nicholls of Scotland Yard, who had been investigating the organization, recognized Sugarman as having previously attempted to report a false burglary. Bringing Sugarman into custody, he was tried at the Old Bailey on charges of conspiracy, fraud and receiving stolen goods and sentenced to 18 months imprisonment at hard labour. Although his accomplices Mallinson and Harold Jenkins immediately fled the country, Harry Jacobson, was arrested. After being freed on bail, Jacobsen had reportedly swindled his mother out of £600 which he claimed would use to compensate the burglary victims before attempting to flee the country himself.
