= Harry W. Jenkins =

United States Marine Corps general

- Military career
- Allegiance: United States of America
- Branch: United States Marine Corps
- Service years: 1960–1993
- Rank: Major general
- Conflicts: Vietnam War; Gulf War

Harry W. Jenkins is a former major general in the United States Marine Corps.

== Career ==
Jenkins graduated from San Jose State College with a B.A. degree in June 1960, and was commissioned a second lieutenant in the Marine Corps. He also holds an M.S. degree from the University of Wisconsin (1972). He completed The Basic School the following year. He was then assigned to the 5th Marine Regiment and then the 9th Marine Regiment in Okinawa, Japan.

From 1962 to 1964, Jenkins was executive officer of the San Francisco Naval Shipyard. The following year, he became a senior instructor at the Mountain Warfare Training Center.

After studying amphibious warfare at the Officer Candidates School, Jenkins was deployed to serve in the Vietnam War with the 26th Marine Regiment. In 1969, he was assigned to the 1st Marine Division as Civil Affairs Officer.

After returning to the United States, Jenkins was named the Marine Officer instructor of the Naval Reserve Officers Training Corps at the University of Wisconsin–Madison. From there he was stationed at Headquarters Marine Corps, where he eventually served in the Office of the Commandant of the Marine Corps.

In 1976, Jenkins was deployed to serve with the 9th Marine Regiment. The following year, he was assigned to the Office of the Assistant Secretary of Defense for Public Affairs and served in the National Military Command Center. After graduating from the Naval War College, Jenkins returned to Headquarters Marine Corps.

Jenkins was assigned to the 2nd Marine Division in 1984. In 1986, he became chief of staff of the division. The following year, he was named legislative assistant to the commandant of the Marine Corps. In 1988, he was given the additional duties of director of public affairs.

In 1989, he was assigned to Naval Amphibious Base Little Creek. After serving in the Gulf War, Jenkins was named assistant chief of staff of command, control, communications and computers of the Marine Corps in 1991. The following year, he became director, expeditionary warfare, in the staff of the Chief of Naval Operations. Since retiring from the Marine Corps, he has been chairman of the executive committee of the Marine Corps Association.

== Awards and decorations ==
Awards he received during his career include the Navy Distinguished Service Medal, the Legion of Merit, the Bronze Star Medal with Combat Valor device and three award stars, the Defense Meritorious Service Medal, the Navy Commendation Medal with Combat Valor device, the Combat Action Ribbon, the Presidential Unit Citation with two service stars, the Navy Unit Commendation, the National Defense Service Medal with service star, the Vietnam Service Medal with silver service star, the Southwest Asia Service Medal with two service stars, the Navy Sea Service Deployment Ribbon with service star, the Arctic Service Ribbon, the Vietnamese Gallantry Cross, the Vietnam Campaign Medal and the Kuwait Liberation Medal.

1st Row	Navy Distinguished Service Medal	Legion of Merit	Bronze Star Medal with Combat Valor device and three award stars	Defense Meritorious Service Medal
2nd Row	Navy and Marine Corps Commendation Medal with "V" device	Combat Action Ribbon	Presidential Unit Citation with 2 service stars	Navy Unit Commendation
3rd Row	National Defense Service Medal with 1 bronze service star	Vietnam Service Medal with 1 silver service star	Southwest Asia Service Medal with 2 service stars	Navy Sea Service Deployment Ribbon with service star
4th Row	Arctic Service Ribbon	Vietnam Gallantry Cross	Republic of Vietnam Campaign Medal	Kuwait Liberation Medal

== Education ==
- B.A. – San Jose State University
- M.S. – University of Wisconsin-Madison
