= William Stanley Jenkins =

Canadian flying ace

- Born: 26 May 1890; Russell, Ontario, Canada
- Died: Unknown; Washington, D.C., U.S.
- Military career
- Allegiance: United Kingdom
- Branch: Canadian Expeditionary Force; Royal Flying Corps
- Service years: 1915–1919
- Rank: Captain
- Units: 87th Battalion (Canadian Grenadier Guards), CEF; No. 87 Squadron RFC; No. 40 Squadron RAF; No. 210 Squadron RAF
- Conflicts: World War I • Western Front
- Awards: Distinguished Flying Cross & Bar

Captain William Stanley Jenkins DFC* (26 May 1890 – May 1966) was a Canadian flying ace during World War I. He was officially credited with 12 aerial victories, having scored his first two while still on sick leave.

== Early life and entry into military ==
Jenkins was born in Russell, Ontario, Canada, on 26 May 1890 to Robert S Jenkins and Annie Bickford. He enlisted into the Canadian military and the 87th Battalion (Canadian Grenadier Guards), CEF on 9 October 1915. His enlistment papers list his next of kin as his mother, Mrs. R. S. Jenkins. Jenkins gave his profession as "window dresser", and served for three years with the 1st Regiment, Grenadier Guards of Canada. The medical officer's description said Jenkins had fair hair and complexion, grey eyes, and was 5 feet 7 3/4 inches (1.72 m) tall. The medical clearance was dated 1 December 1915. The young recruit was assigned to 87th Battalion (Canadian Grenadier Guards), CEF and served as a corporal in France. He transferred to the Royal Flying Corps in May 1917.

A surviving memo by Jenkins gives some insight into his transition into the RFC. He was training with 87 Training Squadron in Canada, beginning perhaps as early as August 1917, when it moved overseas. This interruption to his training shunted him off to No. 40 Squadron RAF at Croydon, England, where he was forced to repeat some of his training. He had 39 hours 55 minutes in his pilot's log by 25 March 1918. He then had to wait out bad weather and a shortage of aircraft to make his final flight. As a result, his date of rank was 1 April 1918, leaving him shy of one day's seniority for promotion.

== World War I ==
=== Promotions and appointments ===
On 2 October 1917, Jenkins was appointed temporary captain while still a second lieutenant.

On 25 January 1918, he was relieved of duties as captain and second in command of a siege battalion. On 1 February 1918, he was again appointed temporary captain, with the actual rank of second lieutenant. On 13 March 1918, he was posted to 40 Squadron. Upon completion of training, he moved on to 210 Squadron on either 15 or 19 May 1918; his admission to hospital at this time may have confused the record. He would not officially return to duty until 2 August 1918.

In the meantime, on 28 June 1918, he relinquished the rank of captain when he ceased being second in command of a siege battalion; once again, he reverted to second lieutenant.

=== Aerial success ===
Jenkins used his Sopwith Camel to destroy a German Albatros D.V fighter on 27 May 1918. On 6 June, he teamed with fellow Canadian John Gerald Manuel to destroy an enemy reconnaissance two-seater aircraft over Doulieu. It appears that while Jenkins was still technically convalescent, he was not too ill to fight. He would not be discharged from hospital until 2 August 1918.

He then ran off a string of eight consecutive triumphs over German fighters during August, September, and October. On 3 October, he was injured; he returned to duty on the 14th. The day before the armistice, 10 November 1918, he destroyed a DFW C.V reconnaissance aircraft and a Fokker D.VII. Jenkins thus ended his war with a tally of two Fokker D.VIIs set afire in flight, five other German fighters destroyed, two German reconnaissance aircraft destroyed, and three enemy aircraft driven down out of control. He had twice received the Distinguished Flying Cross for his valour.

Also on 10 November, Jenkins' Officer Commanding recommended him for both promotion and decoration. The recommendation for decoration noted that Jenkins had flown some very effective ground attack missions during early November, and mentions a victory over a German kite balloon. An attachment, listing his victories, lists a victory date not seen elsewhere, on 14 August 1918. If Jenkins was indeed a balloon buster, it seems likely he downed the gasbag on this date.

== List of aerial victories ==
Aerial victories
No.	Date/time	Aircraft	Foe	Result	Location	Notes
1	27 May 1918 @ 1920 hours	Sopwith Camel; Serial number D3404	Albatros D.V	Destroyed	East of Ypres	
2	6 June 1918 @ 0825 hours	Sopwith Camel s/n D9590	Reconnaissance aircraft	Destroyed	Doulieu	Victory shared with John Gerald Manuel
3	21 August 1918 @ 1220 hours	Sopwith Camel s/n E4407	Albatros D.V	Destroyed	West of Warneton	
4	31 August 1918 @ 1625 hours	Sopwith Camel s/n E4407	Fokker D.VII	Driven down out of control	Wijnendaele Wood	
5	3 September 1918 @ 1810 hours	Sopwith Camel s/n E4407	Fokker D.VII	Driven down out of control	Lille	
6	17 September 1918 @ 1830 hours	Sopwith Camel s/n E4407	Fokker D.VII	Set afire; destroyed	South of Ostend	
7	17 September 1918 @ 1830 hours	Sopwith Camel s/n E4407	Fokker D.VII	Set afire; destroyed	South of Ostend	
8	24 September 1918 @ 1440 hours	Sopwith Camel s/n E4407	Fokker D.VII	Destroyed	Schooze-Keyem	
9	29 September 1918 @ 0755 hours	Sopwith Camel s/n D8147	Fokker D.VII	Destroyed	A mile west of Lichtervelde	
10	1 October 1918 @ 1710 hours	Sopwith Camel s/n D8147	Fokker D.VII	Driven down out of control	Roulers	
11	10 November 1918 @ 0840 hours	Sopwith Camel s/n D8219	DFW reconnaissance aircraft	Destroyed	Merbes-le-Château	
12	10 November 1918 @ 1315 hours	Sopwith Camel s/n D8219	Fokker D.VII	Destroyed	East of Binche	

== Post World War I ==
Jenkins remained in the Royal Air Force postwar. On 11 December 1918, he addressed the memo to his Officer Commanding concerning the shortage of a day's seniority for promotion. He would be repatriated on 6 April 1919.

== Honours and awards ==
Distinguished Flying Cross

2nd Lt. William Stanley Jenkins, Sea Patrol.

"An intrepid pilot who has met with much success in numerous battles. On one day last month he led three machines in an attack on seven of the enemy. He engaged in combat with four separate enemy machines, set fire to one at a height of 14,000 feet, and then, getting on the tail of another, fired 150 rounds into it, resulting in complete destruction. Lt. Jenkins has, on previous occasions, destroyed or brought down out of control six enemy aircraft."

Bar to the Distinguished Flying Cross
2nd Lieut. William Stanley Jenkins, D.F.C.

"An exceptionally skilful pilot, conspicuous for his courage and disregard of danger. Since 5 October he has accounted for four enemy aeroplanes crashed and one driven down out of control. On 10 November he crashed an enemy two-seater, and later on destroyed a Fokker, in addition to attacking enemy troops and transport with marked success."
