= Jack Jenkins =

Jack Jenkins may refer to:

- Jack Jenkins (baseball) (1942–2002), American player
- Jack Jenkins (American football) (1921–1982), player
- Jack Jenkins (rugby union) (1880–1971), Wales international rugby union player
- Jack Jenkins (Welsh footballer) (1892–1946), Welsh international player
- Jack Jenkins (English footballer), English footballer

== See also ==
- Jackie Jenkins (disambiguation)
- John Jenkins (disambiguation)
