= Bill Jenkins (Royal Marines officer) =

British Marine officer (1925–2002)

- Born: 28 March 1925; Morpeth, Northumberland, England
- Died: 24 October 2002 (aged 77)
- Education: Hertford College, Oxford
- Military career
- Allegiance: United Kingdom
- Branch: Royal Marines
- Service years: 1943–1946
- Rank: Captain
- Conflicts: Second World War: Italian Campaign; Operation Roast
- Awards: Distinguished Service Order

Captain William Glyn Jenkins DSO (28 March 1925 – 24 October 2002) was a Royal Marines officer and academic. He was the youngest Royal Marine to win the Distinguished Service Order in the Second World War, and later became senior lecturer in international affairs at the Royal Military Academy Sandhurst.

== Early life ==
Jenkins was born at Morpeth in Northumberland. He was educated at Blundell's School in Tiverton, where he won a bursary, and, in October 1942, he gained a Macbride Open Scholarship to Hertford College, Oxford, to read geography.

Jenkins cut short his studies after a year and applied to join the Royal Navy; but he failed his medical because of slight colour-blindness and joined the Royal Marines in August 1943. After passing through Officer Cadet Training Unit, he was commissioned early in 1944 and posted to the Commando Basic Training Centre at Achnacarry, north of Fort William in the Highlands.

== Second World War ==
After gaining his green beret, Jenkins was posted to Vis, off the Dalmatian coast, the only Yugoslav island in Allied hands. No. 43 (Royal Marine) Commando were supporting Tito's partisans and, as a subaltern with "E" Troop, he took part in a number of raids on the German garrisons of the other islands.

In October 1944, 43 Commando disembarked at Gruz Harbour, near Dubrovnik, as part of "Floydforce" and Jenkins's troop was deployed inland to harry the retreating Germans. One of its more unusual tasks was to get supplies by mule to an isolated patrol of the Long Range Desert Group.

=== Distinguished Service Order ===
43 Commando went to Italy in January 1945 and, two months later, as part of the last major offensive of the Italian campaign, it moved up to its new front on the river Reno, north of Ravenna. In the first few days of April, as part of 2nd Commando Brigade, it launched "Operation Roast", a curtain-raiser for the Eighth Army's spring offensive (in which the British 78th Infantry Division, supported by armour, attacked towards Argenta from the east, while, to the west of the town, 10th Indian Division was poised for a thrust north of Bologna).

As reported in Jenkins' obituary:

In the early hours of 18 April, 43 Commando passed through 2 Commado’s position with the aim of clearing a pumping station and the fortified houses that dominated the surrounding country. When the commanders of 'D' and 'E' Troops were wounded, Jenkins, a 20-year-old subaltern, took over both troops and led the left prong of the attack. Reconnoitring ahead of his men, he was wounded in the neck and then hit in the back with a force which flattened him. After picking himself off the ground, astonished to be still alive, he found that he was on the edge of a German slit trench.

Cocking his Colt .45 pistol, Jenkins fired blind into the trench. A terrified man jumped up shouting, 'Don't shoot! I'm an Austrian!' Jenkins first took him prisoner, and then the Spandau gunners who were little more than shapes in the darkness beside him. After sending them to the rear under the escort of a corporal with orders to return with a section of 'E' Troop, he found himself alone again. In the improving light, Jenkins saw a file of seven German soldiers with slung rifles emerge from behind a building. There was not a stitch of cover, so all that he could do was crouch down. The Germans stopped and started chatting to each other and, a few moments later, they were joined by two more.

Jenkins stood up, marched forward, pointed his Tommy gun at them and bellowed: Hande hoch! After a moment of indecisiveness, they lowered their rifles to the ground and were sent to the rear with a group of marines which had made a timely reappearance.

43 Commando was now exposed on a narrow salient with Germans on both flanks. Its diversionary assault had proved highly effective and it was ordered to pull back. When Jenkins had seen his troops into their new position, a doctor removed some metal splinters from his neck; the bullet that had knocked him down was discovered lodged among the biscuits in his 24-hour pack.

He was awarded the Distinguished Service Order for his actions.

== Post war ==
The Germans surrendered northern Italy on 2 May 1945 and 43 Commando was disbanded soon afterwards. Jenkins was posted to Hong Kong to join 42 Commando and, after promotion to captain, he took command of "W" Troop.

Jenkins was demobilised in 1946 and returned to Oxford to complete his degree. He won a Blue for swimming and captained his college rugby XV before going to Yale for a year on a Henry Fellowship. He taught for six years at Christ's Hospital in Horsham, with a break for a year at Hilton College in Natal. In 1956, he became a senior lecturer in international affairs at the Royal Military Academy Sandhurst.

== Sources ==
- Extracted from the Obituary of Captain Bill Jenkins, The Daily Telegraph, 27 December 2002.
- Obituary of Captain William Jenkins, The Times, 14 November 2002.
- Commando Subaltern at War: Royal Marine Operations in Yugoslavia and Italy, 1944–1945; W.G. Jenkins; Greenhill Books, 1996. ISBN 1-85367-231-9; ISBN 978-1-85367-231-6
- Royal Marine Officers 1939−1945
