= Jenkinson =

Jenkinson is a surname. Notable people with the surname include:

- Anthony Jenkinson (1529–1610/1611), English explorer
- Jenkinson baronets, holders of the two British baronetcies for people with the surname Jenkinson
  - Charles Jenkinson, 1st Earl of Liverpool (1729–1808), British politician
  - Robert Jenkinson, 2nd Earl of Liverpool (1770–1828), British politician
  - Charles Jenkinson, 3rd Earl of Liverpool (1784–1851), British politician
- Carl Jenkinson (born 1992), English footballer
- Clay S. Jenkinson (born 1955), American author
- David Jenkinson (1934–2004), English railway modeller and historian
- David Stewart Jenkinson (1928–2011), English soil scientist
- Debbie Jenkinson, Irish illustrator and comic artist
- Denis Jenkinson (1921–1997), English motorsport journalist
- Hilary Jenkinson (1882–1961), English archivist
- Kate Jenkinson (born 1981), Australian actress
- Leigh Jenkinson (born 1969), English footballer
- Louisa Jenkinson, Countess of Liverpool (1767–1821), first wife of Robert Jenkinson, 2nd Earl of Liverpool
- Mary Jenkinson, Countess of Liverpool (1777–1846), second wife of Robert Jenkinson, 2nd Earl of Liverpool
- Monique Jenkinson (born 1971), also known as Fauxnique, American artist, choreographer, drag performer and author
- Philip Jenkinson (1935–2012), English journalist, television presenter and film collector
- Robert Jenkinson (canoeist) (born 1960), New Zealand canoeist
- Selina Jenkinson (1812–1883), British aristocrat
- Thomas Jenkinson (MP) (fl. 16th century), English member of Parliament for Leicester
- Tom Jenkinson (footballer) (1865–?), Scottish footballer (Heart of Midlothian and Scotland)
- Thomas Jenkinson (English footballer) (fl. 1914–1916), English footballer (Bradford City)
- Thomas Jenkinson (footballer, born 1877) (1877–1949), English footballer (Sheffield United, Grimsby Town)
- Tom Jenkinson (musician) (born 1975), British recording artist and record producer known professionally as Squarepusher
- William Jenkinson (footballer, born 1892) (1892–1967), English footballer
- William Jenkinson (footballer, born 1883) (born 1883), English footballer

== See also ==
- Warner-Jenkinson Co. v. Hilton Davis Chemical Co.
- Jenkin
- Jenkins (disambiguation)
