= Jinkinson =

Jinkinson is a surname, similar to Jinkins, Jenkinson, Jenkins and Jenkyns. Notable people with this surname include:

- Alan Jinkinson (1935–2022), British trade union leader
- Earl Jinkinson (1905–1995), American antitrust lawyer and father of Georgia Bonesteel
- Georgia Bonesteel (née Jinkinson) (born 1936), American quilter, author and television host

== See also ==
- Jinkinson v Oceana Gold (NZ) Ltd, a 2009 New Zealand court case
