= Jenkyn =

Jenkyn is a surname. Notable people with the surname include:

- Edwin Jenkyn (1876–1947), Australian rules footballer
- William Jenkyn (1613–1685), English clergyman
- William Jenkyn Thomas (1870–1959), Welsh headmaster and author

== See also ==
- Jenkyn Beverley Smith, British historian of medieval Wales
- Jenkyns
- Jenkins (disambiguation)
- Jenkins (surname)
