= Eleanor Burns =

American quilter (born 1945)

- Born: July 3, 1945 (age 81); Zelienople, Pennsylvania, U.S.
- Occupations: Quilter, teacher, author
- Known for: Quilt in a Day
- Television: PBS, RFD-TV
- Children: 2
- Awards: Inducted into the Quilters Hall of Fame, 2012
- Website: eleanorburns.com

Eleanor Burns (born July 3, 1945, in Zelienople, Pennsylvania) is a master quilter and former TV series host of Quilt in a Day, which aired in 1994 on PBS for six seasons.

== Career ==
Burns first began sewing on a crankle-handle toy sewing machine as a child, then started stitching on her Aunt Edna's feed sacks.

She attended Edinboro State College and earned a Bachelor of Science degree in education there. She then went on to a graduate program at Pennsylvania State University and became a special education teacher in the Pittsburgh School District.

Her first book, Make a Quilt in a Day: Log Cabin Pattern, was self-published in 1978. The book has been credited with starting a quilt-making revolution as people learned Burns' style of stitching a quilt. She has since written more than 100 books on the subject of quilting. In addition, Burns has written many patterns and developed a series of specialty rulers for quilting. The Quilt in a Day TV series, which first aired in 1990, was based on Burns' book Make a Quilt in a Day. Burns had a show on PBS called Women Who Taught Us to Sew, in which she taught about historical women who were influential in the field of quilting, such as Ruby McKim and Marie Webster.

Burns has designed fabric collections for Benartex, Inc. She was a spokesperson for Elna sewing machines and Baby Lock Quilters Dream machines. She also designed specialty rulers for quilting.

=== Awards ===
In 2012, Burns was inducted into the Quilters Hall of Fame.

=== List of publications ===
- All Star Quilts
- Amish Quilt
- Applique in a Day
- Bears in the Woods
- Birds in the Air
- Boston Common Quilt
- Christmas Quilts and Crafts
- Cross Stitch Quilts
- Day & Night Quilt Book
- Delectable Mountains
- Double Pinwheel Quilt
- Dutch Windmills
- Easy Strip Tulip
- Fans & Flutterbys Quilts
- Flying Geese Quilt in a Day
- Garden Lattic
- GO! Qube - Mix and Match Blocks and Quilts Book
- Go! Sampler Book
- Grandmother's Garden Quilt
- Hearts Delight-Nine Patch Variations
- It's 'El'ementary
- Jewel Box Quilt
- Last Minute Gifts
- Lover's Knot Placemats
- Lover's Knot Quilt
- Machine Quilting Primer
- Magic Vine Quilt
- Make a Quilt in a Day: Log Cabin Pattern (1978)
- May Basket
- Nana's Garden
- Northern Star
- Orion's Star Quilt
- Pineapple Quilt
- Quick Trip Quilts
- Quilt Blocks on American Barns
- Quilter's Almanac Block Party Three
- Quilts From El's Attic
- Quilts from El's Kitchen
- Quilts Through the Seasons
- Recycled Treasures from Grandma's Attic
- Radiant Stars Quilts
- Schoolhouse Wallhanging
- Scrap Quilt
- Snowball Quilt Simplified
- Spools and Tools Wallhanging
- A Star For All Seasons
- Star Log Cabin
- Star Spangled Favorites
- Stars Across America Block Party Series Seven
- Still Stripping - After 25 Years
- Stockings and Small Quilts
- Sunbonnet Sue Visits Quilt in a Day
- Tales of First Ladies and Their Quilt Blocks
- Tennessee Waltz Quilt
- Trio of Treasured Quilts
- Triple Irish Chain
- Underground Railroad Sampler
- Victory Quilts
- Wild Goose Chase Quilts

== Personal life ==
Burns maintains a quilting studio at her Bear's Paw Ranch in Julian, California, a mountain town in San Diego County.

She has dyslexia.

Burns shares her interest in quilting with two sisters, Patricia (Patty) and Judith (Judy). Judy died in 2012.

== See also ==
- Barbara Brackman
- Bonnie Leman
- Georgia Bonesteel
- List of North American pieced quilt patterns
- List of quilters
