= Jenkin =

Jenkin, of Franconian origin, is translated in English as "Little John" or more literally "John the little".

== Forename history ==
Jen/Jean (pronounced "Jon") being a diminutive of Jehan/Jehannes* (John/Johan*) followed by kin/ken meaning little creating Jenkin or Jenken. *(Referred to as Johannes in the Latin and Germanic referring to the Bible name John.) The name "Jenkin" or "Jenken" first use in England is seen as early as 1086 as a diminutive of the English form of John. It was often translated from the Dutch/French as "John the younger" or seen as "John Jenken". The non-diminutive Jehan/Jehannes (pronounced "Jo-han/Jo-han-nes") was also translated into English as John. When Jen/Jean is present, usually given to a younger child, Jehan/Jehannes is listed as "John the elder" but, never translated as "Big John".

Confusion can arise when the sire is listed as John, a son is John (the elder) and another son is John (the younger). Today, in English the term John, Senior is used for the father, while the names of John can use Junior or numeric designation (i.e. "II"). "Jon" the phonetic of John is sometimes seen but only in males as is the younger male nickname of "Johnny". The name "Jean" once pronounced "Jon" in English and once a male name has become since the 16th century a female name in English from the French Jeanne.

== Surname history ==
Jenkin is a surname variant of Jenkins commonly seen in Welsh, Cornish and in English (mainly Devon) ancestry. Its translation is "Little John" or more literally "John the little". It first was found in Monmouthshire in the Domesday Book of 1086 and some say earlier than 1066 and the Norman Conquest of England.

Its common English use, eventually becoming a surname, may have come as a generic and now obsolete nickname as the "Little Johns". This may have been a 12th Century reference to the Welsh and Cornish people because of their relative smaller stature or more likely as a derogatory for the subjects or illegitimate offspring of King John of England, Earl of Cornwall and Gloucester (1166–1216).

Jenkin or Jenkins and its surname variants should not be confused as a shortened Jenkinson and its variants which refers to the son of "Little John".

== People with the surname ==
- Alan Jenkin (born 1962), Australian rules footballer
- Albert Jenkin (1872–1961), Wales international rugby player
- Anne Jenkin (born 1955), British politician
- Bernard Jenkin (born 1959), British politician
- Charles Frewen Jenkin (1865–1940), British engineer and academic
- Dorothy Jenkin (1892–1995), New Zealand watercolorist, botanical illustrator and printmaker
- Fleeming Jenkin (1833–1885), British engineer
- Graham Jenkin (born 1938), Australian poet, historian, composer, and educator
- Guy Jenkin (born 1955), British film director and comedy writer
- Horrie Jenkin (1893–1985), Australian rules footballer
- Kenneth Hamilton Jenkin (1900–1980), British writer on Cornish topics
- Louis Fleeming Jenkin (1895-1917), British military pilot
- Loveday Jenkin, Cornish politician and language campaigner
- Mark Jenkin (born 1976), Cornish director, editor, screenwriter, cinematographer and producer
- Martin Jenkin (born 1975), English cricketer
- Patrick Jenkin (1926–2016), British politician
- Richard Jenkin (1925–2002), Cornish language scholar and politician
- Robert Jenkin (1656–1727), English clergyman and nonjuror
- T. J. Jenkin (1885–1965), Welsh professor of agriculture
- Tim Jenkin (born 1948), South African writer, former anti-apartheid activist and political prisoner
- Brown Jenkin, a “small, furry thing” with a human face in the horror story The Dreams in the Witch House by H. P. Lovecraft

== People with the forename ==
- Jenkin Alban Davies (1885–1976), Welsh international rugby union player
- Jenkin Coles (1843–1911), Australian politician
- Jenkin Jones (disambiguation), several people
- Jenkin Thompson (1911–1944), British Army doctor, awarded the George Cross
- Jenkin Whiteside (1772–1822), American lawyer and politician

== See also ==
- The surname of Jenkins.
- Junkin
- Little John
- Jenkintown
