= Thomas Jenkinson =

Thomas Jenkinson may refer to:

- Thomas Jenkinson (MP) (fl. 16th century), English member of Parliament for Leicester
- Tom Jenkinson (footballer) (1865–?), Scottish footballer (Heart of Midlothian and Scotland)
- Thomas Jenkinson (English footballer) (fl. 1914–1916), English footballer (Bradford City)
- Thomas Jenkinson (footballer, born 1877) (1877–1949), English footballer (Sheffield United, Grimsby Town)
- Squarepusher (born 1975), pseudonym of Tom Jenkinson, British recording artist
