= Mary Alice Barton =

American quilter, quilt historian, collector, and philanthropist (1917–2003)

- Born: Mary Alice Pemble; June 9, 1917; Indianola, Iowa, U.S.
- Died: December 7, 2003 (aged 86); Ames, Iowa, U.S.
- Spouse: Thomas Arthur Barton
- Children: 4

Mary Alice Barton (June 9, 1917 – December 7, 2003) was a nationally recognized American quilter, quilt historian, collector, and philanthropist. She was inducted into the Quilters Hall of Fame as of September 29, 1984, for greatly contributing "through her collecting, researching and sharing of information." In 1999, her work as a quilter was recognized when her "Heritage Quilt" was chosen as one of the 100 Best American Quilts of the 20th century.

Barton was one of the first people who collected women's magazines and clothing, using them to date quilts by the fabrics they contained. She created "one of the most comprehensive collections of quilts, costumes, and fashion plates ever assembled and donated to public institutions." Her collection was eventually divided among a number of Iowa institutions, donated for use in research and teaching as well as exhibition.

== Biography ==
Mary Alice Pemble was born on June 9, 1917, one of six children of Harold H. Pemble and Edith Lisle Pemble of Indianola, Iowa. Her family lived in town, where they had a large garden, cattle, horses, and chickens. They later started an orchard outside of town. Mary's father helped run a hardware store, and her mother sold cheese and produce with the children's help.

Both of her grandmothers were quilters who made quilts for her. Mary learned to sew and embroider at a young age, and won awards at the Iowa State Fair for her dresses, suits and coats. She was also an outstanding student athlete.

She graduated from Indianola High School in 1936. She attended Simpson College, and then completed a B.S. degree in landscape architecture at Iowa State University.

In 1942, she married a classmate, Thomas Arthur Barton. They moved to Washington, D.C. During World War II they worked as engineering draftsmen at the Hydrographic Office of the U.S. Navy, making maps for air navigation. Mary Barton was the only woman in her department.

In 1946, with the arrival of her first child, Barton gave up her job to become a full-time homemaker. The couple eventually had 4 sons. Following her husband's career, they moved from Washington to Iowa, then to Michigan, and finally back to Ames, Iowa in 1955. There Thomas Barton became the head of the department of Landscape Architecture.

== Collecting ==
In 1949, Barton inherited several family quilts made by her grandmothers. She first purchased a quilt at a farm auction in 1967. In 1968, she organized a program on quilts for the Heritage Division of the Faculty Women's Club at Iowa State University. She was later elected president of the Faculty Women's Club, and served from 1974-1975. As part of the program she wrote a play on the history of quilting. Aunt Mary's Quilting Party was performed around a quilt frame for the Faculty Women's Club on January 8, 1969. The lack of collected and published resources on fabrics and quilts impelled Barton towards collecting.

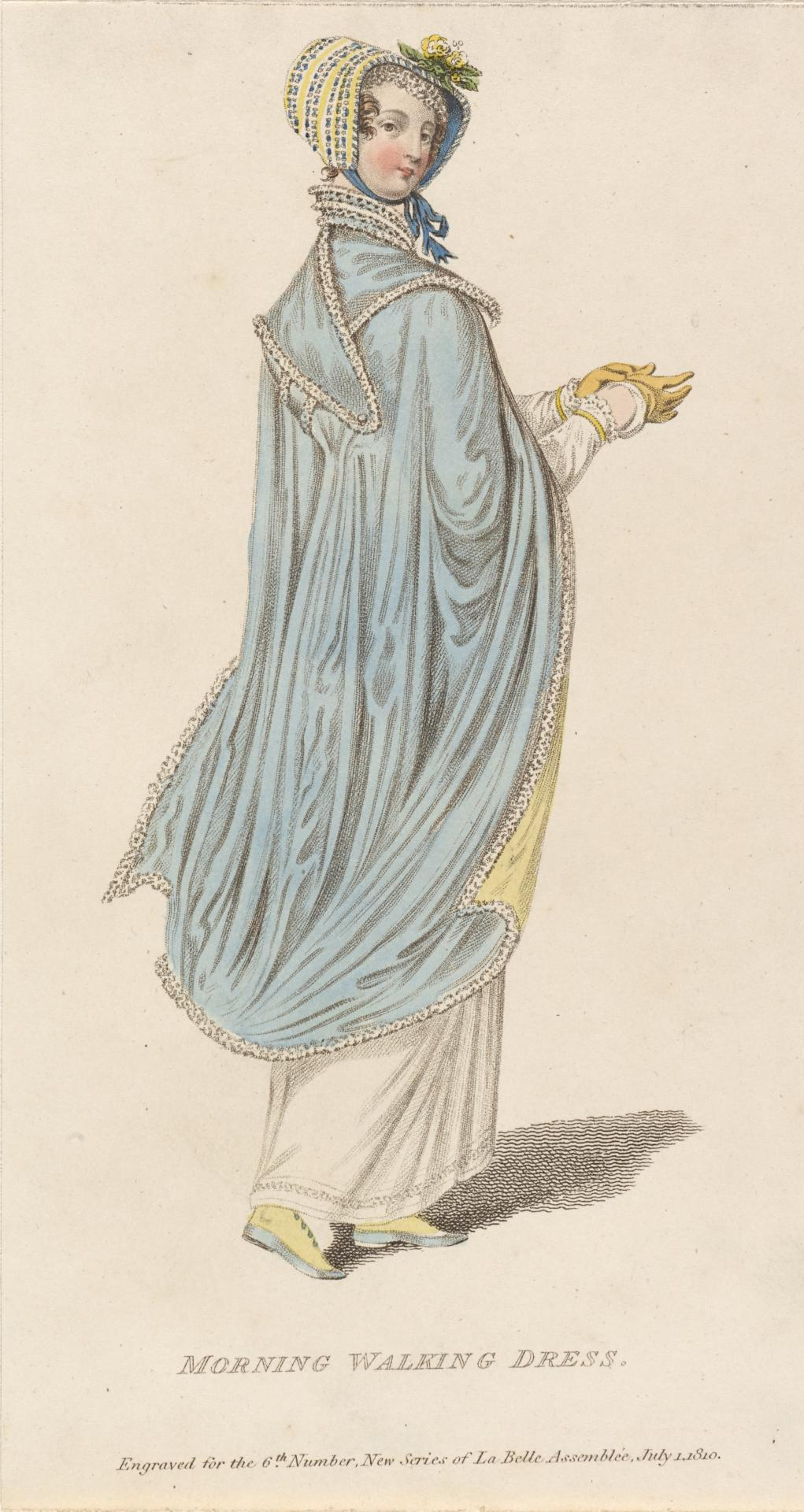
Morning walking dress (1810), Fashion plate from La Belle Assemblée, Included in Barton's collection

Barton collected far more than just finished quilts. She created extensive notebooks to document a collection that also included fabric scraps, patterns, magazines, photographs, family letters and diaries, newspaper clippings, fashion illustrations and catalogs. She studied the manufacture of fabrics and their use in clothing, quilts, and household textiles. By researching the companies that had produced dated materials, and comparing fabrics to other dated materials and garments in her quilt and clothing collections, she was able to create references that showed what fabrics looked like and how they were used at different times. As a result it became possible to use the references to date quilt pieces and determine not only when they were individually made, but also when they were combined into quilts.

Barton was invited to lecture at major events, including the Kansas Quilt Symposium (1978) and the Missouri Quilt Symposium (1980). She served on the planning committee of Iowa's first statewide quilting event, the Heirloom to Heirloom Quilt Conference (1983). There, and again at the Continental Quilting Congress in Arlington, Virginia in 1984, she set up innovative Study Centers. There, people could use items from her collection, arranged by decade, to comparatively date other works.

Interviewed in 1984, she described herself as an "independent researcher" and a "conservator" who was "just trying to save things for future historians." At the Continental Quilting Congress in Arlington, Virginia, on September 29, 1984, Mary Barton was inducted into the Quilters Hall of Fame.

== Quilting ==
External videos
- A Century of Quilts - Part 5, Mary Pemble Barton's "Heritage Quilt", PBS.

Barton created many quilt study panels comparing fabrics and patterns from her collections. She also made a number of complete quilt tops, often reproducing antique quilts that she particularly liked.

Barton may have begun working on her "Heritage Quilt" as early as 1966, although some sources suggest 1968. In this quilt, she created a historically accurate visual record of the tools, activities, places, people and quilt patterns involved in her pioneer family's migration across America. The fabrics "worn" by the women and children in the quilt are heirloom materials.

Completed in time for the 1976 bicentennial, the quilt won a blue ribbon at the 1976 Iowa State Fair. It was entered in the National Bicentennial Quilt Contest in Warren, Michigan, where it won an honorable mention. In 1999, Barton's work as a quilter was nationally recognized when her "Heritage Quilt" was chosen as one of the 100 Best American Quilts of the 20th century. The choice of quilts was adjudicated by the Quilter's Newsletter Magazine, the International Quilt Festival, Quiltmaker magazine and McCall's Quilting. This resulted in publication of a book, an exhibition at the 2000 International Quilt Festival, and a PBS documentary film.

== Philanthropy ==
Mary Barton's activities as a collector and philanthropist were inspired in part by her concern that the crafts heritage of Iowa should be preserved in Iowa. As early as the 1970s, she began donating quilts from her collection to organizations in Iowa. Barton donated hundreds of quilts to the Living History Farms in Urbandale, Iowa; Simpson College in Indianola, Iowa; the State Historical Society of Iowa; and the Farm House Museum on the campus of Iowa State University.

Her "Heritage Quilt", along with 67 quilts and quilt tops and 1500 other items, was donated to the State Historical Museum of Iowa between 1987 and 2001. This donation became the basis of the exhibit Patterns for learning: Selections from the Mary Barton Collection in 1993. A similarly named exhibit was presented in 2007–2008. As of 2009, many items from her collections were included in the Quilt Index.

Mary Barton left her extensive collection of fashion illustrations and related materials, organized by year from 1776–2008, to the Iowa State University Archives. Part of her collection was donated in 1988, the rest in 1995.
