= Marie Webster House =

Historic house in Indiana, United States

- U.S. National Register of Historic Places
- U.S. National Historic Landmark
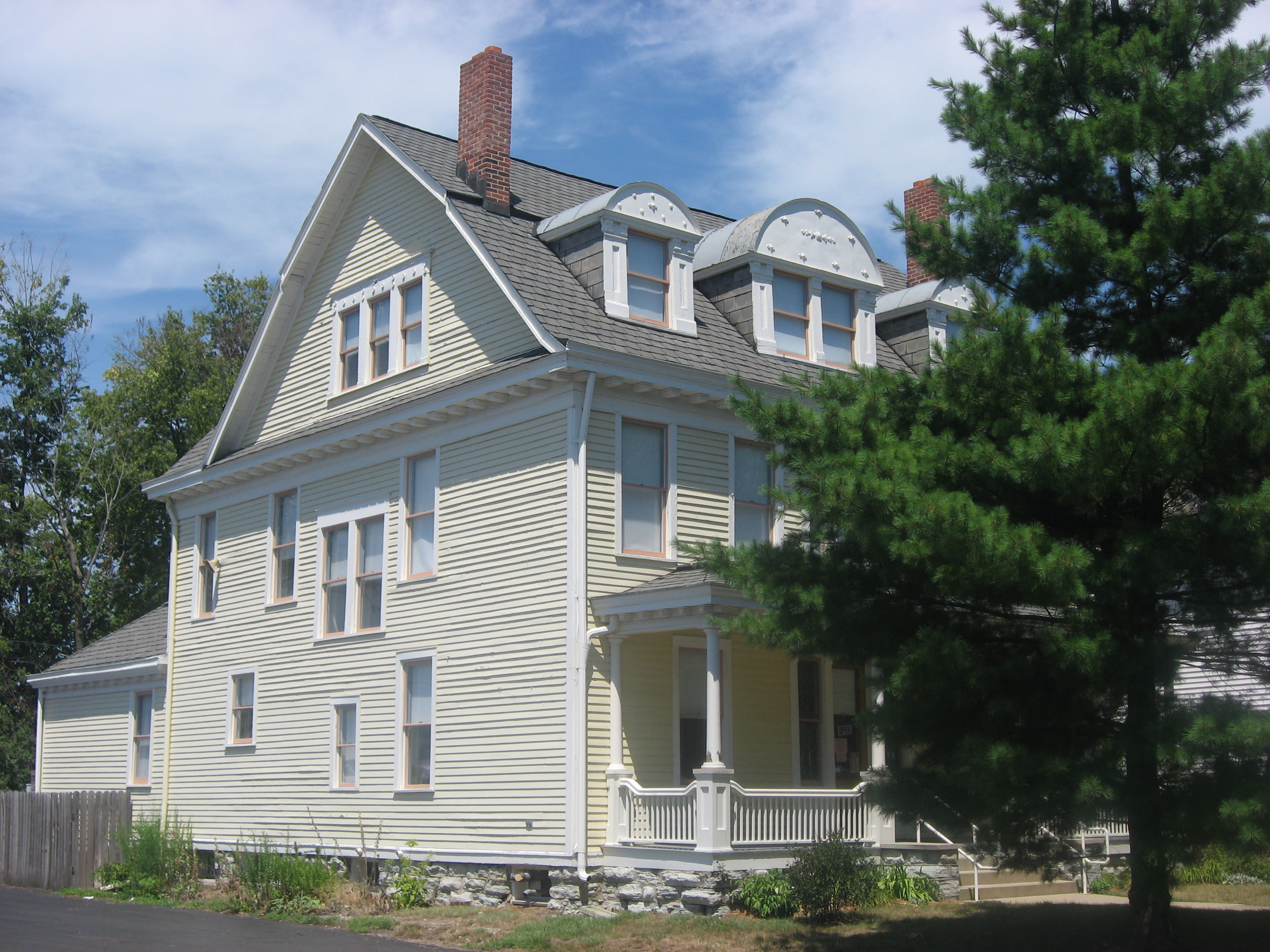
- Marie Webster House, now the Quilters Hall of Fame

- Location within Indiana Location within the United States
- Location: 926 South Washington Street, Marion, Indiana
- Coordinates: 40°33′9″N 85°39′36″W
- Area: less than one acre
- Built: 1905
- Architectural style: Colonial Revival
- NRHP reference No.: 92000678

Significant dates
- Added to NRHP: June 17, 1992
- Designated NHL: November 4, 1993

The Marie Webster House, also known as George Webster Jr. and Marie Daugherty House, is a historic house at 926 South Washington Street in Marion, Indiana. Built in 1905, it was the home of quilter Marie Webster (1859–1956) from 1909 until 1942, and is now home to the Quilters Hall of Fame. It was declared a National Historic Landmark in 1993, honoring Webster's role in promoting and broadening interest and knowledge of the craft.

The Quilters Hall of Fame is a non-profit organization dedicated to honoring those who have made outstanding contributions to the world of quilting. Founded in 1979 by Hazel McDowell Carter, the Hall features a museum with exhibits of quilts and quilt-makers.

== Description and history ==
The Marie Webster House stands south of the Marion town center, on the west side of South Washington Street between 9th and 10th Streets. It is a 2 1/2-story wood-frame structure with Colonial Revival styling that is not architecturally distinguished. The building's interior has retained features and finishes original to the period of the Webster's ownership, despite its initial conversion to apartments and its present use as a museum. Marie Webster displayed quilts and patterns to customers in the second-floor sitting room.

Marie Webster did not begin making quilts until 1909, when she was fifty years old. In her childhood she had learned, sewing, embroidery, and needlework, but she did not become an aficionado of quilting until later in her life. Her critical contribution to the craft was in bringing the craft to a broad national audience, when it had previously been a largely regional practice. Her 1915 publication Quilts: Their Story and How to Make Them was a seminal work in this respect, and remains an influence on the field to this day. She introduced the practice of selling quilting patterns, kits with precut fabrics, as well as partially and completely finished quilts. She ran her business, the Practical Patchwork Company, out of this house, until her retirement in 1942.

The house was purchased by neighbors, who converted it to apartments. After standing vacant for several years, it was condemned by the city in 1990. It was rescued from demolition by Webster's granddaughter, who purchased it and gave it as site for the Quilter's Hall of Fame.

== Quilters Hall of Fame honorees ==
Honoree Name	Year inducted
Lenice Ingram Bacon	1979
William R. Dunton	1979
Ruth Ebright Finley	1979
Jonathan Holstein	1979
Gail Van Der Hoof	1979
Marguerite Ickis	1979
Averil Colby	1980
Anne Orr	1980
Florence Peto	1980
Grace Snyder	1980
Bertha Stenge	1980
Jean Ray Laury	1982
Bonnie Leman	1982
Cuesta Benberry	1983
Mary Alice Barton	1984
Jinny Beyer	1984
Carrie Hall	1985
Rose G. Kretsinger	1985
Patsy Orlofksy	1987
Jeffrey Gutcheon	1990
Carter Houck	1990
Donna Wilder	1990
Marie D. Webster	1991
Amy Emms, MBE	1992
Michael James	1993
Sally Garoutte	1994
Karey Bresenhan	1995
Joyce Gross	1996
Nancy Crow	1997
Yvonne Porcella	1998
Shiela Betterton	1999
Barbara Brackman	2001
Ruby Short McKim	2002
Georgia Bonesteel	2003
Bets Ramsey	2005
Virginia Avery	2006
Mary Vida Schafer	2007
Helen Kelley	2008
Merikay Waldvogel	2009
Jean Wells	2010
Ardis & Robert James	2011
Eleanor Burns	2012
Meredith Schroeder	2013
Ruth B. McDowell	2014
Mimi Dietrich	2015
Carolyn L. Mazloomi	2016
Virginia Gunn	2017
Xenia Cord	2018
Fons & Porter, Mary McElwain	2019
Marti Michelle, Mary Gasperik	2021
Diane Gaudynski, Florence LaGanke Harris	2022
Elly Sienkiewicz	2023

== See also ==
- List of museums in Indiana
- List of National Historic Landmarks in Indiana
- National Register of Historic Places listings in Grant County, Indiana
