= Pioneer Girl =

Pioneer Girl may refer to:

- Pioneer Girl, The Early Life of Frances Willard, a 1939 book illustrated by Genevieve Foster
- Pioneer Girl, a 1982 novel by Margaret Pemberton, also issued as A Many-Splendoured Thing
- Pioneer Girl: Growing Up on the Prairie, a 1998 biography of American quilter Grace Snyder by Andrea Warren
- Pioneer Girl, a 2014 novel by Bich Minh Nguyen
- Pioneer Girl: The Annotated Autobiography, an autobiography by Laura Ingalls Wilder, annotated and published in 2014

== See also ==
- Sallie Fox: The Story of a Pioneer Girl, a 1995 children's book about California pioneer Sallie Fox
- Pioneer Girls, a youth organization
