= Junkin =

Junkin is a surname. Notable people with the surname include:

- George Junkin, Presbyterian minister and college president
- George C. Junkin, American politician from Nebraska
- George G. Junkin, lawyer
- Harry W. Junkin (writer), Canadian radio and television writer
- John Junkin, British comic actor and writer
- Mike Junkin, American football player
- Trey Junkin, American football player

== See also ==
- Jenkin
- Jenkins
- Junkins
