= William Jenkinson =

William Jenkinson may refer to:

- William Jenkinson (footballer, born 1892) (1892–1967), English footballer for Liverpool and Wigan Borough
- William Jenkinson (footballer, born 1883) (1883–?), English footballer for Gainsborough Trinity
- Bill Jenkinson (1874–1960), English footballer for Burnley and West Ham United
