= Lap Quilting with Georgia Bonesteel =

- Genre: How-to
- Directed by: Bill Hannah
- Presented by: Georgia Bonesteel
- Country of origin: United States
- No. of seasons: 12

Production
- Executive producer: Bob Royster
- Producer: Bill Hannah
- Production locations: Eno Park, NC
- Cinematography: Lynn McConnell, Todd Hall, Galen K. Black
- Running time: 27 minutes
- Production company: UNC-TV

Original release
- Network: UNC-TV, PBS
- Release: January 7, 1979 – present

Lap Quilting with Georgia Bonesteel is a how to series on PBS hosted by Georgia Bonesteel. The show debuted in January 7, 1979 on UNC-TV (now PBS North Carolina) and has been on the air for over 40 years. By 1983, it was being distributed out of Boston to 120 major PBS stations, including Chicago's WYCC. The show shares different quilting techniques and styles from around the United States and the world.

== Overview ==
The series shows viewers how to make quilts using a particular type of quilting known as lap quilting. Traditional quilting uses a hoop or frame which the fabric is stretched across. Lap quilting does not use a frame.

Viewers are shown various project ideas and different quilting and sewing techniques they can try at home. Tips and tricks are also provided, such as how often to replace the needle in their sewing machines.

The series was one of the first how-to shows produced by UNC-TV, along with The Woodwright's Shop, to be broadcast around the United States. The show has been broadcast on over 200 PBS stations across the country. This series was started after Bonesteel had been a guest on an early PBS series Sewing Is Fun.

== Host ==
Georgia Bonesteel is a quilting judge, author and host of the show. She has been the president of the International Quilt Association, which is involved in the history and art of quilting worldwide.

Bonesteel is credited with having invented lap quilting while teaching a class at Blue Ridge Community College in North Carolina. She has incorporated quilts in to the presentation at the national historic site Connemara Farms, the home of Pulitzer Prize winner Carl Sandburg. In 2005, Georgia Bonesteel acted as the executive producer for the documentary her son, Paul Bonesteel, produced titled, The Great American Quilt Revival.

== Guests ==
The show has had numerous guests that share their expertise in different quilting fields. Guests have included teacher Laura Wasilowski, thimble maker Tommie Jane Lane and quilting instructor Linda Taylor.
