= Ruby McKim =

American quilt designer

- Born: Ruby Short; July 27, 1891; Millersburg, Illinois
- Died: July 26, 1976 (aged 85); Independence, Missouri
- Occupations: Quilt designer; Entrepreneur; Art teacher; Writer; Editor
- Years active: 1916–1937
- Spouse: Arthur McKim (m. 1917–1967)
- Children: 2

Ruby Short McKim (née Short; July 27, 1891 – July 26, 1976) was an American quilt designer, entrepreneur, teacher, writer and magazine editor. She developed an early interest in drawing, and graduated from the New York School of Fine and Applied Art in 1912. McKim taught drawing in the Missouri public school system, and became a contributor to The Kansas City Star, from which her quilt works was first published.

She was appointed editor of various magazines, and co-founded the McKim Studios mail-order company with her husband Arthur McKim in 1925 as a means of distributing her works widely. The business later evolved into Kimport Dolls, and McKim began selling imported antique dolls in the domestic market. Her works experienced a revival from 1999, and she was inducted into the Quilters Hall of Fame in 2002.

== Early life ==
McKim was born on July 27, 1891, in Millersburg, Illinois. Her father, Morris Trimble Short, was a Church of Jesus Christ of Latter-day Saints-affiliated frontier missionary, and her mother, Viola Vernon Short, was a librarian for the church and avidly promoted children's education. McKim had an older sister and one elder brother. The family was poor and relied on church donations to survive. They moved west to Independence, Missouri in 1899, when she was eight years old, because the town was the focal point of their religion.

Morris died in 1901 and McKim and her siblings were raised solely by their mother. She demonstrated an early interest in drawing, and graduated from Independence High School in 1910. McKim earned the Art Award during her senior year, and was art editor of the high school yearbook. At age 19, she ventured to the New York School of Fine and Applied Arts (now the Parsons School of Design) to study design with Frank Alvah Parsons, and received sponsorship from her uncle. McKim graduated from the school in 1912, and returned to Independence, Missouri to teach in the public school system. She became supervisor of drawing for grades one to twelve that year.

== Quilting ==
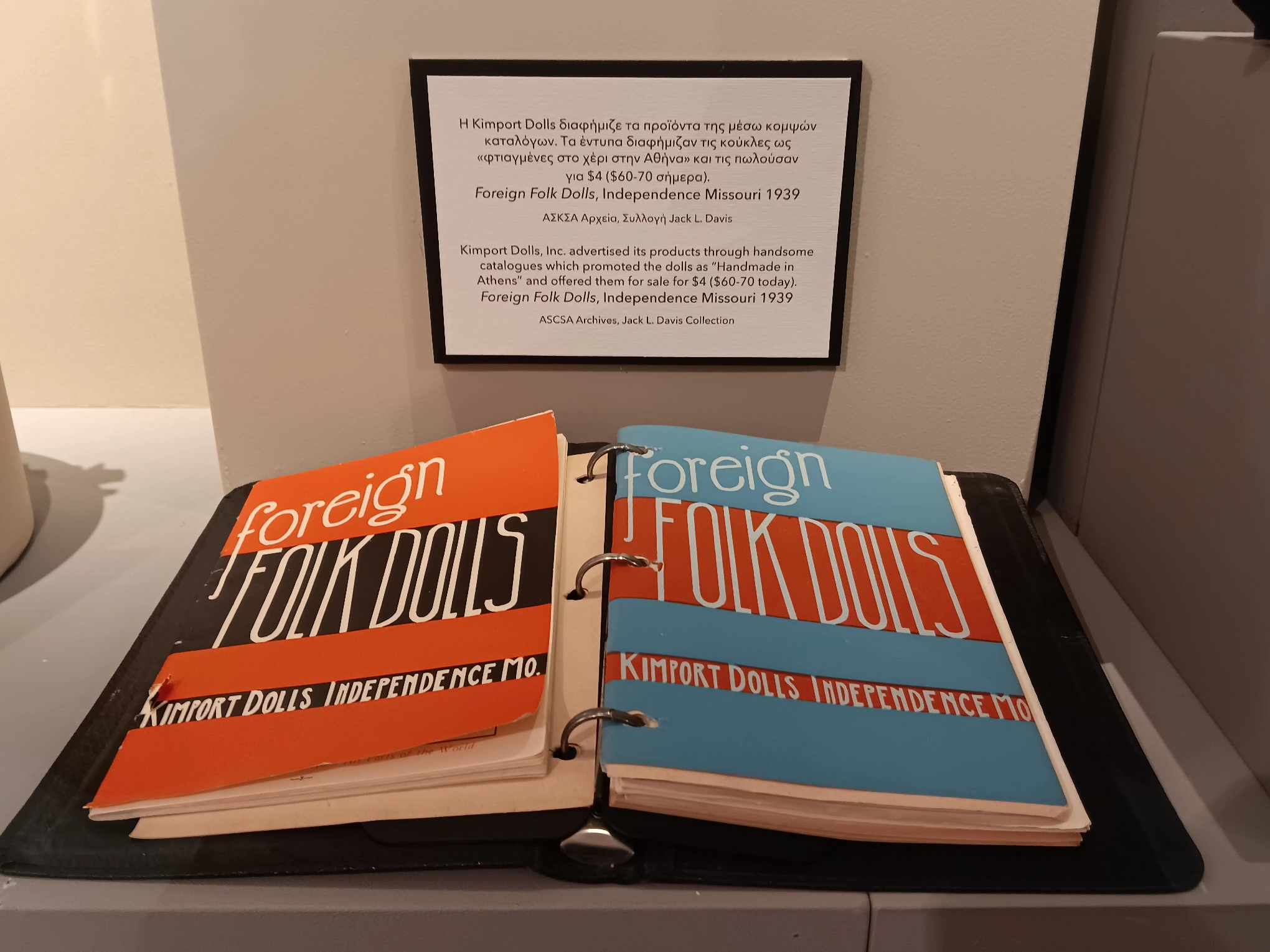
1939 Kimport Dolls Foreign Folk Dolls catalogue

In 1916, McKim became a teacher at Kansas City Manual Training High School, and sponsored a club for fine art students. That same year on May 7, her needlework quilt block designs called "Quaddy Quiltie" were first published by The Kansas City Star after winning a contest the newspaper. Her second quilt matter, "Mother Goose", was published later in the year. McKim traveled across the United States from 1920 to 1922 in order to begin business relationships so her patterns and needlework could be sold. Her first nationally syndicated pattern was "Nursery Rhyme" in 1921. She became children's art editor of Child Life magazine in January 1922, and she co-founded McKim Studios as a mail-order company with her husband Arthur in 1925, with McKim designing the patterns. In September 1928, McKim was made art editor and a columnist for Better Homes and Gardens, and became a contributor to a regular quilt pattern feature in The Kansas City Star in the same year until 1930, when the column was taken over by Eveline Foland.

She published her only book, 101 Patchwork Patterns, in 1931. The patterns seen in the book are compilations of old quilt patterns that McKim redrew or remade, and was described by Christina Fullerton Jones as "a comprehensive pattern encyclopedia and how-to book for avid quiltmakers at a time when obtaining this information was a daunting task." Soon after the publication of the book, her family ventured to Europe in 1933 to discover new markets to publish their material. They returned to the United States with a contract from an Australian newspaper and a new business in selling imported antique dolls domestically, and evolving the company name to Kimport Dolls. McKim was later made editor of Doll Talk magazine, a role she held for decades. She published the pattern "Toy Shop" in 1933, the "Flower Basket" pattern came in 1934, and her final work "American Ships" was published in 1937.

After the death of her husband, McKim authored a poem on the influence he had on her life, and distributed among the company's mail-order clients. She was a former president of the Mothers Club of the Independence Sanitarium, and was a member of the Independence Music Club.

== Personal life ==
She was married to her high school classmate Arthur McKim from July 16, 1917, until his death in June 1967. They had two children. McKim died at a nursing home in Independence, Missouri on July 26, 1976.

== Legacy ==
The Encyclopædia Britannica called her "one of the 20th century's most innovative American quilt designers", and she was included in the first edition of Who's Who of American Women as well as in subsequent editions of the encyclopedia. According to a biography of McKim, she became a successful entrepreneur during a period where women did not enter into the business industry. The publications of her works led to quilt contests and shows to spread across the United States. and her works experienced a revival from 1999 to the 21st century. McKim was inducted into the Quilters Hall of Fame in July 2002, the 33rd member to be so honored, in recognition of her "important contributions to the quilt revival of the early twentieth century, through her widely distributed designs, her book, and her business."

== See also ==
- Bonnie Leman
