= Jinkins =

Jinkins is a surname. It is similar to Jinkinson, Jenkins and Jenkyns.

== List of people with the surname ==
- Jim Jinkins (born 1953), American animator, cartoonist, children's author and creator of the animated Doug television series
- Laurie Jinkins (born 1964), American politician

== See also ==
- Jinkies
