= Queer Person =

1930 children's novel by Ralph Hubbard

- Author: Ralph Hubbard
- Illustrator: Harold von Schmidt
- Language: English
- Genre: Children's literature
- Publisher: Doubleday
- Publication date: 1930
- Publication place: United States

Queer Person is a 1930 children's novel written by Ralph Hubbard and illustrated by Harold von Schmidt. It tells the story of a deaf-mute toddler boy who is raised among the Pikuni in central Montana. The novel earned a Newbery Honor in 1931.

== Plot summary ==
When a lost four-year-old deaf-mute wanders into a Pikuni camp he is shunned by them as marked by evil spirits. They give him the name "Queer Person". An old medicine woman takes him in and raises him. She predicts greatness for him and ensures he is worthy of it. During his test of bravery as an adolescent, he rescues the chief's son. He wins the heart of the chief's daughter and eventually becomes a leader of the tribe.
