= Nancy Crow =

American artist

Nancy Morrison Crow (born 1943) is an American artist whose medium is quilts. She is one of the leading figures in contemporary quilting, beginning in the 1970s and 1980s, and is also known for her development of certain techniques to allow more spontaneity and expression.

== Early life and education ==
Crow was born in 1943 in the small town of Loudonville, Ohio. She is the youngest of eight children. Crow studied ceramics and weaving at Ohio State University where she earned a BFA in 1965 and a MFA in 1969.

== Quilting ==
In 1979, Crow began to concentrate seriously on quilt making. Her emphasis from the beginning was on graphic power of color. In her early quilts, she juxtaposed traditional quilt patterns like the Log Cabin block with vibrant color combinations. Her later works use her own asymmetrical designs. Crow is one of the leading figures in the development of the art quilting movement of the 1970s and 1980s. In the 1990s, Crow developed freeform cutting techniques allowing for more spontaneity and personal expression. She says of her work:

The purpose of my quilts is to make something beautiful but, at the same time, my quilts are a means of expression, representing my deepest feelings and my life experiences. In addition, my quilts are all about how I see color and color relationships, how I see shapes, and how I see line and linear movements. They are also about complexity, sadness, and hope.

— Nancy Crow

In 1979 Crow co-founded of the Quilt National exhibitions, a juried biennial exhibition of contemporary quilt art. In 1994, she established a teaching workshop on the farm where she lives, near Baltimore, Ohio.

== Quilt series ==
- Newe (1980)
- Bittersweet (1980–1982) In 1979 Crow and her husband moved to a 50-acre farm west of Baltimore, Ohio. Bittersweet is a series of 22 quilts produced during the three-year period after she and her husband moved to the farm.
- Tramp Art (1983 – )
- Passion (1983–1985) A series of five quilts Crow created while she cared for her dying mother.
- Yellow Crosses' (1985)
- Lady of Guadalupe (1985–1988)
- Jacob's Ladder (1986 – )
- Amish Paisley (1987 – )
- Mexican Wheels (1987 – )
- Double Mexican Wedding Rings (1988–1992) This series combines the traditional Double Wedding Ring block with innovative changes in the scale of the blocks and her dramatic use of color.
- Color Blocks I (1988–1991) Color Blocks I comprised three quilts: Color Blocks #1, Color Blocks #2, Color Blocks #3 (1988–1989). These three quilts explore visual complexity. In 1990 Crow returned to the Color Blocks series and created Color Blocks #4, which explores the square as a motif.
- Bow Tie (1991–1995) This series of 13 quilts explores the traditional quilt block Bow Tie in the context of abstract expressionist painting and asymmetrical shapes. Using simple shapes and simple formats, Crow explores the figure/ground relationship.
- Chinese Souls (1990–1994) In September 1990, Crow visited Xi'an in Shaanxi Province in China. While there she witnessed an episode of police brutality. Trucks filled with young men were driven around the city by the police with the sirens blaring. The young men had committed crimes and were scheduled to be executed. Crow created a series of quilts in which the circle represented the souls of the men scheduled to be executed, color threads symbolized the ropes around their necks.
- Constructions (1995–present) This series comprises more than 75 quilts. They mark Crow's ongoing explorations of shape and the actions of sewing, cutting and re-sewing to form complex patterns.
- Self-Portraits Mono-prints (2011-2012) during 7 focused weeks beginning in July 2011 Nancy created over 125 mono-prints by drawing marks in thickened dye then lifting fabric over the top and printing it. She said 40% were total duds, 20% had some redeeming qualities, 20% were not bad at all, and the last 20% were pretty darn good.

== Awards and honors ==
- 1996 – National Living Treasure Award from the University of North Carolina at Wilmington.
- 1997 – Inducted into the Quilters Hall of Fame
- 1999 – Fellow of the American Craft Council, an award made "to honor those who have made an outstanding contribution to the crafts in America."
- 2002 – Individual Artist Fellowship from the Ohio Arts Council.
- 2019 - James Renwick Alliance For Craft Master of the Medium in Fiber

== Exhibitions ==
- 1987 "Craft Today: Poetry of the Physical", American Craft Museum, New York City
- 1992 Invitational: Craft Today USA, sponsored by the American Craft Museum, New York City
- 1992 Solo at the Miami University Art Museum, Oxford, Ohio
- 1994 British Crafts Council Gallery, London, England
- 1995–6 Solo exhibition at the Renwick Gallery of the Smithsonian American Art Museum, Washington DC
- 2008 Solo show, Nancy Crow: Transformational Quilts, at the Muskegon Museum of Art, Michigan.
- 2008, Solo show "Nancy Crow: Works from 1988-2008", Miller Gallery at Carnegie Mellon University, Pittsburgh
- 2010, Fuller Craft Museum, Brockton, Massachusetts.
- 2020-2021 NANCY CROW | DRAWINGS: MONOPRINTS & RIFFS at the International Quilt Museum in Lincoln, Nebraska
- 2023 NANCY CROW | SEQUENCES, RIFFS & DRAWINGS at the Schweinfurth Art Center, Auburn, NY
- 2024 NANCY CROW | ON MY MIND - RIFFS / CONSTRUCTIONS / DRAWINGS / MONOPRINTS, at the Kent State University Museum, Kent State University, Kent, Ohio

== Public collections ==
- American Folk Art Museum, New York City
- Indianapolis Museum of Art
- Miami University Art Museum, Oxford, Ohio
- Museum of Arts and Design, New York City (formerly the American Craft Museum)
- Renwick Gallery, Smithsonian American Art Museum, Washington, D.C.
- International Quilt Museum

== Publications ==
- Crow, Nancy (1990). Nancy Crow, quilts and influences. Paducah, KY: American Quilter's Society. ISBN 9780891459446.
- ————— (1992). Nancy Crow : work in transition. Paducah, KY: American Quilter's Society. ISBN 9780891459958.
- ————— (1995). Gradations. Saddle Brook, NJ: Quilt House Pub. ISBN 978-1881588122.
- ————— (1995). Nancy Crow – improvisational quilts. Lafayette, CA: C & T. ISBN 9781571200044.
- ————— (2006). Nancy Crow. Elmhurst, IL: Breckling Press. ISBN 1933308036.
- ————— (2008). Crossroads : constructions, markings, and structures. Elmhurst, IL: Breckling Press. ISBN 978-1933308197.
- ————— (2012). Nancy Crow Self-Portraits Mono-Prints. Baltimore, OH: Nancy Crow.
- ————— (2020). Nancy Crow: Drawings: Monoprints and Riffs. Lincoln, NE: International Quilt Study Center and Museum. ISBN 978-1735278407.

== See also ==
- Chinese Souls, a quilt made by Crow in 1992, purchased by the Indianapolis Museum of Art
