= Dorothy Jenkin =

New Zealand artist and printmaker

- Born: Dorothy Catherine Wentworth Venning; 23 October 1892; Paddington, London, United Kingdom
- Died: 13 April 1995 (aged 102); New Zealand
- Known for: Painting, Printmaking, Botanical illustration
- Spouse: Thomas Hugh Jenkin (m. 1918; died 1958)

Dorothy Catherine Wentworth Jenkin (née Venning; 23 October 1892 – 13 April 1995) was a New Zealand watercolorist, botanical illustrator, and printmaker. She was a founding member of the Invercargill Art Society and participated in campaigning for a public art gallery in Invercargill. She was involved in ensuring the acquisition of Anderson Park and the establishment of the Invercargill Art Gallery at that location. Many of her works are held at the Rakiura Museum and have been reproduced as prints and postcards.

== Biography ==
Jenkin was born in Paddington, London on 23 October 1892 to Mary Kate Venning and her husband Wentworth and named Dorothy Catherine Wentworth Venning. She studied art at the Royal College of Art (where she was only one of three women in her cohort), and while there met her husband Thomas Hugh Jenkin, who was also studying to become an artist. The couple married in 1918 in Kingston and subsequently had two children prior to emigrating to New Zealand. In 1922, after Thomas had gained a position as a teacher at Otago Boys' High School and also controller of the Dunedin School of Art, they emigrated to New Zealand.

Sometime in 1925 Thomas' contract with the Dunedin School of Art was not renewed and Jenkin and he moved their family to Invercargill. There Jenkin undertook commissions as well as teaching art at both the Southland Girl's High School and Gore High School. She and her husband became active members of the arts community in Southland. Jenkin was a member of the Otago Art Society and exhibited works at various Otago Art Society exhibitions from the late 1920s onwards. In 1929 Jenkin had an artwork published in the first volume of the journal Art of New Zealand. She also exhibited with the Canterbury Society of Arts in the 1930s. She was a founding member of the Invercargill Art Society (now part of the Southland Art Society) and exhibited frequently there, specialising in still life paintings. Jenkin was also involved in campaigning for a public art gallery for Invercargill. She was involved in ensuring the acquisition of Anderson Park and establishing the Invercargill Art Gallery at that location.

During summer holidays the Jenkin family visited Stewart Island / Rakiura and Thomas organised a summer art school there. On their retirement in 1952 the Jenkin's moved to Stewart Island / Rakiura permanently, building a log house that overlooked Paterson Inlet / Whaka a Te Wera, and tending to an elaborate garden of rhododendrons, a cherry magnolia, kauri trees, mamaku, and many plants native to New Zealand. Thomas died in 1958. Around this time, at the suggestion of Cedric Smith, the curator at the Rakiura Museum, Jenkin undertook watercolour studies of Stewart Island fungi. Smith sent several of these illustrations to Kew Gardens to assist with the identification of the fungi collected. Jenkin had intended for a book to be published using the watercolour paintings but this did not eventuate. However the Rakiura Museum did make prints as well as postcards of her watercolours and sold the same to the public, many of which became popular designs for postcards. Jenkin also undertook studies of Stewart Island orchids, which inspired the publication of a book on her work. Many of her original botanical illustrations are now held at the Rakiura Museum. Jenkin continued to illustrate until the 1960s, when she stopped due to her failing eyesight.

In 1971 Jenkin donated one of her husband's works, a portrait of Alfred Henry O'Keeffe, to the Dunedin Public Art Gallery.

Jenkin lived on Stewart Island / Rakiura along for 33 years, until she was 98 at which point she went to live with her daughters in Clyde. In 1992 the Rakiura Museum created a special issue of Jenkin's paintings, to celebrate her 100th birthday. She died on 13 April 1995 and is buried with her husband at Saint Johns Cemetery in Invercargill.
