= Jennifer Chiaverini =

American author (born 1969)

- Born: 1969 (age 56–57); Cincinnati, Ohio, U.S.
- Education: University of Notre Dame; University of Chicago

Jennifer Chiaverini (born 1969) is a New York Times bestselling author of several historical novels and the Elm Creek Quilts series, as well as six collections of quilt patterns inspired by her books.

Her original quilt designs have been featured in Country Woman, Quiltmaker, Quiltmaker’s 100 Blocks Volumes 3-5, and Quilt, and her short stories have appeared in Quiltmaker and Quilter's Newsletter. She also designed the Elm Creek Quilts fabric lines for Red Rooster Fabrics. Her first book, The Quilter's Apprentice, was released in 1999.

A graduate of the University of Notre Dame and the University of Chicago, she taught writing in the English Departments of Penn State and Edgewood College. A native of Cincinnati, Ohio, she currently resides in Madison, Wisconsin.

About her historical fiction, the Milwaukee Journal Sentinel writes, “In addition to simply being fascinating stories, these novels go a long way in capturing the texture of life for women, rich and poor, black and white, in those perilous years.”

Chiaverini's 2016 book, Fates and Traitors, tells the story of John Wilkes Booth from Booth's point of view.

In 2017, Chiaverini released Enchantress of the Numbers, a historical novel about the mathematician Ada Lovelace.

== Bibliography ==
=== Elm Creek Quilts novels ===
1. The Quilter's Apprentice (1999)
2. Round Robin (2000)
3. The Cross-Country Quilters (2001)
4. The Runaway Quilt (2002)
5. The Quilter's Legacy (2003)
6. The Master Quilter (2004)
7. The Sugar Camp Quilt (2005)
8. The Christmas Quilt (2005)
9. Circle of Quilters (2006)
10. The Quilter's Homecoming (2007)
11. The New Year's Quilt (2007)
12. The Winding Ways Quilt (2008)
13. The Quilter's Kitchen (2008)
14. The Lost Quilter (2009)
15. A Quilter's Holiday (2009)
16. The Aloha Quilt (2010)
17. The Union Quilters (2011)
18. The Wedding Quilt (2011)
19. Sonoma Rose (2012)
20. The Giving Quilt (2012)
21. The Christmas Boutique (2019)
22. The Museum of Lost Quilts (2024)
23. The World's Fair Quilt (2025)

=== Collections of quilt patterns inspired by the Elm Creek Quilts novels ===
1. Elm Creek Quilts: Quilt Projects Inspired by the Elm Creek Quilts Novels
2. Return to Elm Creek: More Quilt Projects Inspired by the Elm Creek Quilts Novels
3. More Elm Creek Quilts: 11 Quilt Projects Inspired by the Elm Creek Quilts Novels
4. Sylvia's Bridal Sampler from Elm Creek Quilts

=== Historical novels ===
1. Mrs. Lincoln's Dressmaker (2013)
2. The Spymistress (2013)
3. Mrs. Lincoln's Rival (2014)
4. Mrs. Grant and Madame Jule (2015)
5. Christmas Bells (2015)
6. Fates and Traitors (2016)
7. Enchantress of Numbers (2017)
8. Resistance Women (2019)
9. Mrs. Lincoln's Sisters (2020)
10. The Women's March (2021)
11. Switchboard Soldiers (2022)
