= Nellie Snyder Yost =

American historian

Nellie Irene Snyder Yost
- Nellie Snyder Yost in 1980s
- Born: June 20, 1905; Lincoln County, Nebraska
- Died: January 16, 1992 (aged 86); Lincoln, Nebraska
- Resting place: Fort McPherson National Cemetery, Maxwell, Nebraska
- Spouse(s): David Harrison "Harry" Yost, Frank A. Lydic
- Children: Thomas Snyder Yost
- Parent(s): Albert Benton Snyder and Grace Bell McCance Snyder

Nellie Irene Snyder Yost (June 20, 1905 – January 16, 1992) was a historian and writer. She was an active member of the Nebraska State Historical Society, serving for many years as its president, and wrote 13 books (primarily biographies) and many articles on Nebraska history, including biographies of her father, her mother, and Buffalo Bill Cody.

== Early life ==
Nellie Irene Snyder was born on June 20, 1905, to Albert Benton Snyder and Grace Bell McCance Snyder, in a sod house in northwest Lincoln County, Nebraska. At the age of two weeks, she was carried on horseback to a ranch in McPherson County, Nebraska. She suffered a childhood illness that permanently damaged her spine and slowed her growth resulting in her diminutive height of 4 feet,8 inches. She lived with her family in McPherson County until 1919 when the family moved to Maxwell, Nebraska, where she graduated as class valedictorian in 1923. She taught one year in a rural McPherson County school, riding horseback to her school 6 miles (9.7 km) a day. After that, she moved to Salem, Oregon, for two years, where she worked in the office of Miller Department Store.

== Family and later life ==
After moving back to Nebraska, she married David Harrison "Harry" Yost on July 6, 1929, and the couple lived on a ranch in the Box Elder Canyon, south of North Platte, Nebraska, for 30 years. They had one son, Thomas Snyder Yost. Harry fell ill and spent his last five years at the Grand Island Veterans Hospital. During those years, as Nellie spent about 10 days out of each month at the hospital, she would sit by his bed side, writing manuscripts in long hand. He died in 1968. She moved to North Platte, Nebraska, where she was active in the Lincoln County Historical Society. She was very active while in the Historical Society as they worked to open the Lincoln County Museum in 1976. She was active as well in Nebraska Writers Guild. She was active in Riverside Baptist Church where she married Frank A. Lydic on August 30, 1984. He was a long time friend and fellow writer. Frank died on November 9, 1991. Soon after, while finishing a trip to promote her last book, she developed pneumonia and was hospitalized. She was transferred to a hospital in Lincoln where she died on January 16, 1992. She was buried next to her first husband at Fort McPherson National Cemetery. Her information was carved on the back of his gravestone with the epitaph, "She Loved Life."

== Writing ==
Her first book, Pinnacle Jake, was a recounting of her father's stories about the west and ranching. Nellie was 46 when it was published. No Time on My Hands was based on a diary her mother had kept. One of her most noted books, Buffalo Bill: His Family, Friends, Fame, Failures and Fortunes, was published in 1979. It received excellent reviews, garnered awards, and resulted in a trip to New York to appear on Good Morning America on February 22, 1980. Her last book, Evil Obsession, was published in October 1991, just a few months before she died. During her 40 years as a published author, she traveled extensively.

== Awards and honors ==
- Eyes of Nebraska Award, Nebraska Optometric Association, 1970
- Tenth annual Spur Award for Boss Cowman, 1969
- Western Heritage Wrangler Award, Cowboy Hall of Fame, for Buffalo Bill, 1979
- Golden Saddleman, 1975
- Nebraska Foundation Pioneer Award, 1982

== Bibliography ==
- Pinnacle Jake, Caxton Printers, Ltd., Caldwell, Idaho, 1951
- The West That Was, Southern Methodist University Press, Dallas, Texas, 1958
- No Time on My Hands, Caxton Printers, Ltd., Caldwell, Idaho, 1963
- The Call of the Range, Ohio University Press, Athens, Ohio, 1966
- Medicine Lodge, Ohio University Press, Athens, Ohio, 1966
- Boss Cowman, Nebraska University Press, Lincoln, Nebraska, 1969
- Before Today, Holt County Historical Society, O'Neill, Nebraska, 1976
- Buffalo Bill: His Family, Friends, Fame, Failures and Fortunes, Ohio University Press, Athens, Ohio, 1979
- A Man as Big as the West, Pruett Publishing Co., Boulder, Colorado, 1979 – biography of Ralph Hubbard
- Back Trail of an Old Cowboy, University of Nebraska Press, Lincoln, Nebraska, 1983
- Keep On Keeping On, Self Published, 1983
- Pinnacle Jake & Pinnacle Jake Roundup, J. L. Lee Publishers, Lincoln, Nebraska, 1991
- Evil Obsession: The Annie Cook Story, Westport Publishers, Lincoln, Nebraska, 1991
