= Millersburg Township, Mercer County, Illinois =

Coordinates: 41°11′56″N 90°50′24″W

Millersburg Township
- Township
- Location in Mercer County

- Mercer County's location in Illinois
- Country: United States
- State: Illinois
- County: Mercer
- Established: November 8, 1853

Area
  - Total: 36.32 sq mi (94.1 km^{2})
  - Land: 36.32 sq mi (94.1 km^{2})
  - Water: 0 sq mi (0 km^{2}) 0%

Population (2010)
  - Estimate (2016): 707
  - Density: 20.8/sq mi (8.0/km^{2})
- Time zone: UTC-6 (CST)
  - Summer (DST): UTC-5 (CDT)
- FIPS code: 17-131-49256

Millersburg Township is located in Mercer County, Illinois. As of the 2010 census, its population was 755 and it contained 334 housing units. It contains the census-designated place of Millersburg.

Millersburg is named after George Abraham Miller, a Primitive Baptist who, with several families, settled in Mercer County, Illinois on the Edwards River in 1834. These families traveled from Crawfordsville, Montgomery County, Indiana for the purpose of expanding the church into the area. The congregation was known as the Edwards River Church of Regular Baptists. The Church was disbanded in 1847, and the last of the Original settlers Isaac Miller, left for Oregon in 1851.

== Geography ==
According to the 2010 census, the township has a total area of 36.32 square miles (94.1 km^{2}), all land.

== Demographics ==
Historical population
Census	Pop.	Note	%±
2016 (est.)	707
U.S. Decennial Census
