= Chinese Souls =

Quilt designed by Nancy Crow

Chinese Souls #2
- Artist: Nancy Crow
- Year: 1992
- Type: Quilt
- Dimensions: 210 cm × 230 cm (81 in × 89 in)
- Location: Indianapolis Museum of Art, Indianapolis
- Owner: Indianapolis Museum of Art

Chinese Souls #2 is a quilt by American artist Nancy Crow, located at the Indianapolis Museum of Art, in Indianapolis, Indiana. It was created in 1992 as part of a series of memorial quilts she began in response to an atrocity she witnessed in China in 1990.

== Description ==
Chinese Souls #2 is made of resist-dyed fabric which has been embroidered, machine-pieced, and quilted. The dying process created the circular patterns and rich array of hues. The spiraling embroidery adds energy to the composition. This combination of vivid colors, striking patterns, and social commentary is typical of Crow's work.

Crow performed the initial dying of the fabric, which was then resist-dyed by Lunn Fabrics. Crow cut and pieced the quilt alone in her studio, still hearing the cries of the condemned. She stopped frequently to weep. She then embroidered the quilt with the help of Marla Hattabaugh, Suzanne Keller, and Maria Magisano. Hattabaugh performed the hand-quilting according to the pattern created by Crow.

== Background information ==
According to the artist, "Chinese Souls quilts are my memorial to more than 60 teenage boys who were bound and loaded on two trucks to be driven to their execution for petty crimes. I witnessed this horrible incident while I was an exchange artist in China in September 1990. The boys were all wrapped with heavy ropes. In these quilts, the circles represent their souls and the bull’s-eye embroidery and the hand-quilting represents the ropes tied around their souls. The colours of the circles represent the individuals. I have always felt there is an eerie energy that radiates out from the surface of each of these quilts".

So intense was Crow's visceral reaction to the executions that she felt compelled to begin embroidering a grid of circles on the resist-dyed fabric she had with her, an intersection between the cross-hairs of a gun and the circles painted on the wall so the boys' parents would know where they had died. When she returned to the United States, she quickly produced a series of ten quilts based on the same theme, of which she considers Chinese Souls #2 to be the finest.

The artwork was sold by Nancy Crow to the Indianapolis Museum of Art in 1996, where it has the accession number 1996.249.
