= Jenkins =

Jenkins may refer to:

== People ==
- Jenkins (name), history of the surname
  - List of people with surname Jenkins

== Places ==
=== United States ===
- Jenkins, Illinois
- Jenkins, Kentucky
- Jenkins, Minnesota
- Jenkins, Missouri
- Jenkins County, Georgia
- Jenkins Township, Crow Wing County, Minnesota
- Jenkins Township, Luzerne County, Pennsylvania

=== Elsewhere ===
- Hundred of Jenkins, a region in South Australia
- Jenkins (crater), on the Moon and VA

== Software ==
- Jenkins (software), an open source automation server, also known as a continuous integration tool in older versions
- Jenkins hash function

== Other uses ==
- Jenkins Activity Survey, a psychological assessment tool
- Jenkins (drinking game)
- Jenkins Group, a publishing company
- The Jenkins, a country music group
- "Jenkins" (How I Met Your Mother), a television episode
- Leeroy Jenkins, an Internet meme related to World of Warcraft

== See also ==
- Jenkins Commission (UK), an English voting reform commission
- Jenkins Commission (EU), a European monetary commission
- Jenkin
- Jenkyns
