= Ralph Hubbard =

American writer

Ralph "Doc" Hubbard (June 22, 1886 – November 14, 1980) was involved in promoting and preserving Native American culture. He wrote two children's novels with Native American settings, (Queer Person (1930); Newbery Honor (1931)) and The Wolf Song (1935).

Hubbard was born in East Aurora, New York, a son of author and philosopher Elbert Hubbard and his first wife Bertha (née Crawford) Hubbard. As a child he attended Buffalo Bill's Wild West Show, and as a teenager on a trip to the Western United States he visited the Battle of the Little Big Horn site on one of his summer trips to his uncle's ranch in Harlowton, Montana.

Hubbard eventually moved to North Dakota and promoted tribal culture. In the 1920s, he organized Indian dance troupes that toured the U.S. and Europe, and in 1927, he wrote the "American Indian Craft" section of the Handbook for Boys (1927 Boy Scout Handbook). Hubbard taught at the State Teachers College in Minot (now Minot State University). He built Indian museums at Wounded Knee, South Dakota and at Medora.

Nellie Snyder Yost wrote a biography of Hubbard published in 1979, A Man as Big as the West (Boulder CO: Pruett), OCLC 5353711. Minot State University offers the Ralph Hubbard Scholarship. On May 14, 1983, astronomer Norman G. Thomas discovered an asteroid and named it Hubbard in honor of Ralph Hubbard. On June 2, 2009, the Medora City Council changed the name of South Third Street to Doc Hubbard Drive.
