= Debbie Jenkinson =

Irish comic artist

- Areas: Artist, illustrator
- Notable works: Remorse
- Collaborators: Sarah Bowie

Debbie Jenkinson is an illustrator and comic artist from Dublin, Ireland, who is active in the small-press comic scene.

== Education ==
Jenkinson studied animation in the 1990s at Ballyfermot, when she read and was inspired by Art Spiegelman's Maus. After working in an animation studio in the United States, she returned to Ireland to pursue her MA at the National College of Art and Design (NCAD).

== Career ==
Jenkinson is the creator of a long-form comic, Remorse, a story about a young Dubliner who is trapped in a call centre job. It was chosen as runner up on Comicosity's Best of 2015 by Alison Berry. Jenkinson speaks about the "magical triangulation" that occurs in comics, between the image, the text, and the reader. "I think our brains take in pictorial information in a different way...a more natural way. There's something really immersive about reading a comic, that's different from reading prose...It's like looking at the world through someone else's eyes."

She is co-founder of The Comics Lab, a quarterly meet-up of artists in Ireland. She also helped launch the first Graphic Short Prize which is run through The Irish Times with fellow artist Sarah Bowie.

Jenkinson has served on the committee of the Dublin Comic Arts Festival (DCAF), a quarterly comics festival, since 2017.

Jenkinson is a member of Stray Lines, an Irish collective of illustrators and comics artists. In 2015, she contributed the comic Bubble: A True Story to Experiment, the collective's debut comics anthology, which was reviewed by Broken Frontier. Jenkinson is also a member of Illustrators Ireland, a non-profit professional organization representing illustrators in Ireland.

=== Comics ===
Jenkinson's comics work includes Ghosting, which won the Irish Comic News Awards' Overall Best Irish Comic award in 2020 and was included in The Irish Times' list of the best graphic novels of 2021.

In 2023, Jenkinson published Midlands, a self-published graphic novel. Irish Examiner included the work in its list of the best comics and graphic novels of 2023, describing it as a follow-up to her 2020 work Ghosting and discussing its use of landscape, landmarks and themes of community. Midlands was also featured in the World Illustration Awards. The work was subsequently reviewed by Una Mullally in The Irish Times in March 2024.

In 2025, Jenkinson contributed to the Museum of Childhood Ireland's Kings and Queens of the Road project, an initiative exploring people's memories of travelling to and from school.

== Selected works ==
- Heirloom
- War Chest
- The Yellow Planet
- Remorse
- Sunset 4:19
