= Loren and Dora Doxey =

Husband and wife who were charged with murder in St. Louis, Missouri

Loren Doxey (October 20, 1858 – June 19, 1912) and Dora Doxey (March 17, 1879 – 1921) were a husband and wife who were charged with murder in St. Louis, Missouri, in 1909, accused of killing a man whom Dora had married in a bigamous relationship. Dora was found not guilty, and the case against Loren was dismissed. Dora was later convicted of bigamy.

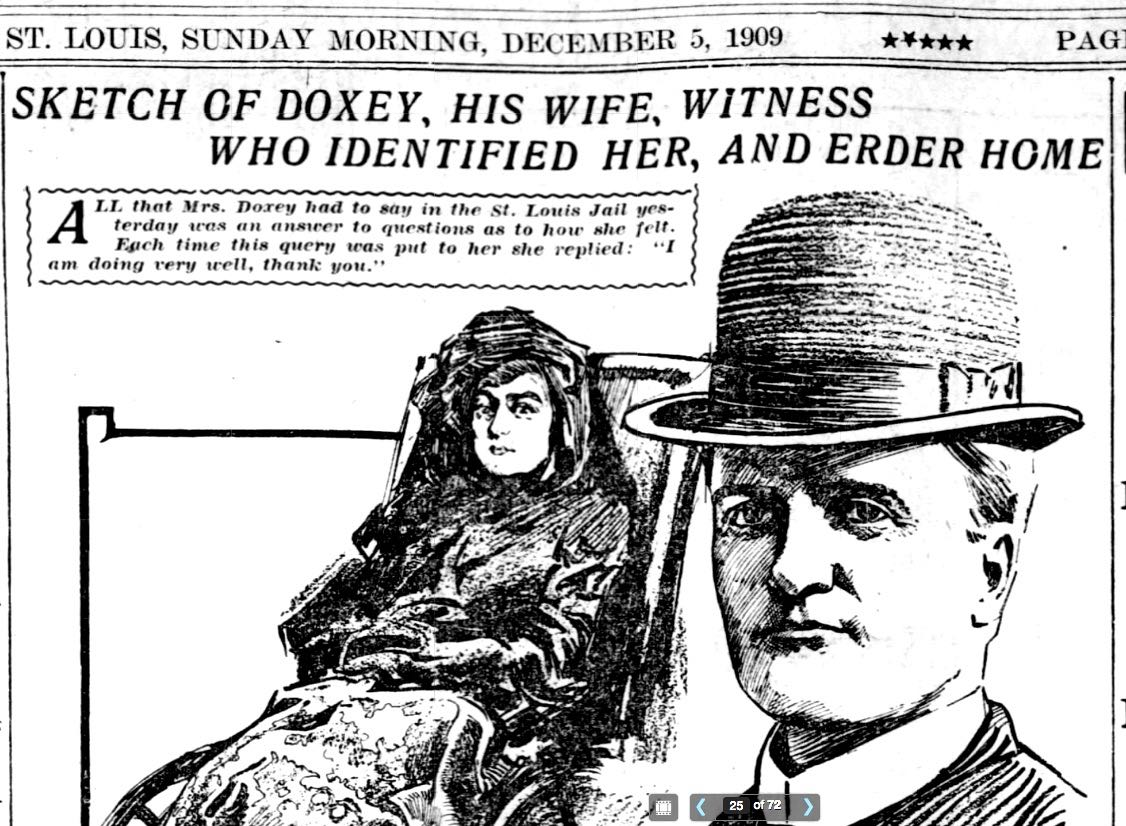
Sketches of Dora Doxey and Loren Doxey on the front page of the St. Louis Post-Dispatch, December 5, 1909

== Personal ==
=== Loren Doxey ===
Loren Doxey was born on October 20, 1858, in Waterloo, Iowa, the son of Thomas Biscoe Doxey and Margaret Henry Doxey. He was graduated with a medical degree from Rush College in 1894, and set up a medical practice in Joy, Illinois, with the aid of Mary Bridgeford, the principal of Joy High School, whom he married in May 1897. Mary died of tuberculosis in 1898.

Doxey drowned in the Tennessee River in Clifton, Tennessee on June 19, 1912. A coroner's jury ruled the death as accidental.

=== Dora Doxey ===
Dora Doxey was born on March 17, 1879, in Millersburg, Illinois, as Dora Fuller, the daughter of Jefferson Fuller, a farmer and land owner in Mercer County, Illinois, and Josephine Himman Awbrey. Dora had two sisters, Mary, older than she, and Grace, younger.

In December 1895, at the age of 16, Dora married Robert L. Downing, one of her teachers at Joy High School. They had four children, all of whom died young. The couple separated in September 1903 and divorced in 1905.

Dora was married to Frank J. Le Gear in Devil's Lake, Wisconsin, in 1905, then to Loren Doxey in 1906 in Burlington, Iowa. She married William J. Erder in Clayton, Missouri, on April 26, 1909, and he died on July 10 of that year. Dora Doxey married Fred Whitney in 1912 in Orofino, Idaho, and George Thomas in 1919, supposedly in the same city.

She died in 1921 in San Francisco.

== Doxey marriage ==
Loren and Dora Doxey began a sexual relationship while she was a patient of his and she was still married to Robert Downing. They were married on August 29, 1906, in Burlington, Iowa. During their marriage, Dora became addicted to morphine, which Loren prescribed and administered. At first they lived in Columbus, Nebraska, and later in Savannah, Tennessee, where Loren Doxey found it difficult to earn a living. They were on their way to a new life in Idaho when Loren drowned.

== Murder trial ==
In December 1909, the authorities in St. Louis found traces of arsenic in the body of William J. Erder, and murder indictments were issued by a grand jury against the two Doxeys, both of them having been arrested on suspicion. Former Lieutenant Governor Charles P. Johnson was engaged as the attorney for both The murder charges were separated, and Dora Doxey was put on trial in May and June 1910. She was found not guilty on June 3, and Loren was set free on June 7, the charges against him being dismissed.

== Bigamy trial ==
Dora Doxey was charged in St. Louis County, Missouri, in December 1909 on a charge of committing bigamy with William J. Erder, and after many continuances, she pleaded guilty and was sentenced to jail on December 1, 1913. While serving time in the county jail in Clayton, Missouri, she carried on a flirtation via a series of letters and whispered conversations with another inmate, Earl Wheeler. She was released on February 24, 1914, and went to Idaho with Fred Whitney.
