= Mimi Dietrich =

American quilter

Mimi Dietrich is an American quilter, quilting instructor, author of 17 books about quilting and a member of the Quilter's Hall of Fame. A lifelong resident of Maryland, she lives in the Baltimore County community of Catonsville. Her first book, Happy Endings: Finishing the Edges of Your Quilts, was originally published in 1987. Her books and workshops focus mainly on applique techniques and Baltimore Album Quilts. In total, her books have sold over a half million copies.

In 2013, Mimi was named as Quilt Teacher of the Year by the International Association of Creative Arts Professionals.

Mimi was the 2015 inductee into the Quilter's Hall of Fame. An exhibition of her quilts named Hometown Girl: Contemporary Quilts of Mimi Dietrich began in 2019 at the Maryland Historical Society.

A breast cancer survivor, Mimi has identified quilting as a tool for maintaining a positive attitude, aiding in her recovery. This inspired her writing of Pink Ribbon Quilts, published in 2011.

== Bibliography ==
- Happy Endings: Finishing the Edges of Your Quilts (That Patchwork Place, June 4, 2013, ISBN 978-1-56477-500-9)
- Baltimore Blocks for Beginners: A Step-by-Step Guide (Martingale & Company, July 10, 2012, ISBN 978-1-60468-172-7)
- Pink Ribbon Quilts: A book Because of Breast Cancer (Martingale & Company, March 23, 2012, ISBN 978-1-56477-279-4)
- A Quilter's Diary: Written in Stitches (That Patchwork Place, May 13, 2008, ISBN 978-1-56477-792-8)
- Mimi Dietrich's Favorite Applique Quilts (That Patchwork Place, November 5, 2007, ISBN 978-1-56477-679-2)
- Mimi Dietrich's Baltimore Basics: Album Quilts from Start to Finish (That Patchwork Place, October 9, 2006, ISBN 978-1-56477-678-5)
- Easy Applique Samplers: 20 Designs to Mix and Match, (Martingale and Company, March 2005, ISBN 978-1-56477-562-7)
- Growing Up with Quilts: 15 Projects for Babies to Teens, with Sally Schneider (That Patchwork Place, September 2004, ISBN 978-1-56477-539-9)
- Bed & Breakfast Quilts with Rise and Shine Recipes, (That Patchwork Place, March 2003, ISBN 978-156477-439-2)
- Borders and Bindings (Basic Quiltmaking Techniques) (Martingale and Company, January 1999, ISBN 978-1-56477-253-4)
- Basic Quiltmaking Techniques for Hand Applique, with Ursula Reikes (Martingale and Company, May 1998, ISBN 978-1-56477-220-6)
- Quilts: An American Legacy (Martingale & Co., Inc., June 1996, ISBN 978-1-56477-167-4)
- Easy Art of Applique: Techniques for Hand, Machine, and Fusible Applique, with Kerry Hoffman and Cheryl Senecal (That Patchwork Place, November 1994, ISBN 978-1-56477-081-3)
- Baltimore Bouquets: Patterns and Techniques for Dimensional Applique (That Patchwork Place, September 1, 1992, ISBN 978-1-56477-010-3)
- Handmade Quilts (Martingale & Co Inc., May 1990, ISBN 978-0-94357-467-7)
