= Jinny Beyer =

American artist, author, teacher, and lecturer (born 1941)

- Born: Geraldine Elizabeth Kahle Beyer; July 27, 1941 (age 84); Denver, Colorado, United States
- Occupations: Quilter; Quilt designer; Author; Lecturer; Teacher
- Years active: 1972–present
- Spouse: John Beyer (m. 1962)
- Children: 3

Geraldine Elizabeth Kahle Beyer (born July 27, 1941) is an American quilt designer, quilter, author, teacher and lecturer. Considered by the quilting industry and the publishing media to be of the first designers to form a fabric collection suited to the needs of quilters, she began her career in India after she had run out of yarn. Beyer's works have won awards in the print media, and she has written about the history of quilting and her techniques. She has designed collections for fabric companies and has taught and lectured on the subject domestically and internationally. Beyer was inducted into the Quilters Hall of Fame in 1984.

== Early life ==
Beyer was born in Denver, Colorado on July 27, 1941. Her mother is artist Polly Kahle and she has three sisters. The family later moved to California, and she was taught knitting and sewing by her mother from an early age. Beyer graduated from the University of the Pacific in Stockton with a Bachelor of Arts degree in Speech and French in 1962, and earned a Master of Arts degree from Boston University in special education. After she left Boston University, Beyer offered to volunteer for the Malaysian Department of Education. She commenced a program for the deaf in Kuching, Sarawak with help from the department.

== Quilting career ==
In 1972, while residing in India after spells in Borneo, Nepal and South America, she sought a new project after she had run out of yarn. Beyer was given a Grandmother's Flower Garden quilt pattern, and cut her first quilt into 600 hexagons of Indian fabrics in the colors dark blue and deep red. Upon returning to the United States, she learned quilting on the top and binding; Beyer was unable to locate another quilter before she came across a meeting held by Hazel Carter near her residence, and showed them a navy-colored Indian Grandmother's Flower Garden quilt top, which they praised. Carter encouraged Beyer to enter the 1976 Quilter's Newsletter Magazine's Bicentennial Quilt Contest, which she won with her red, white, and blue Bicentennial Quilt. The victory launched her career.

She entered Good Housekeeping's 1978 Great American Quilt Contest, and earned national recognition with her first prize victory with her hand-pieced Ray of Light quilt that had American and batik prints. Beyer took ten consecutive months to complete the quilt. She authored her first book, Patchwork Patterns, in 1979 and specialized in drafting techniques. Beyer's second book, The Quilter's Album of Blocks and Borders, in 1980 rationalizes a system proposed by a small number of individuals of eight patterns, and featured 532 pieced block designs and 212 border designs. She wrote a third book, The Quilter's Album of Blocks and Borders, in 1982 to inspire others to produce their own quilt designs. Other books that Beyer authored on the history of quilting and techniques include Medallion Quilts in 1982, The Scrap Look in 1985, Color Confidence for Quilters in 1992, Soft-Edge Piecing in 1995, Designing Tessellations in 1999, Quiltmaking by Hand: Simple Stitches, Exquisite Quilts in 2004, Patchwork Puzzle Balls in 2005, the encyclopedic The Quilter's Album of Patchwork Patterns,: More than 4050 Pieced Blocks for Quilters in 2009 by Breckling Press, and The Golden Album Quilt in 2010.

She was the first quilter to have her independent line of fabrics after she began designing for V.I.P. by Cranston fabric, and introduced the Jinny Beyer Collection for RJR Fabrics in 1985. Beyer had designed more than 2,000 fabrics by 2000, and averaging four to six collections every year. She filmed three videos on quilting between 1987 and 1991, and works as a teacher locally and internationally in countries such as Asia, Australia, New Zealand, Europe, Canada, and Iceland. She ran the Jinny Beyer Seminar on Hilton Head Island, South Carolina from 1981 to 2009, and lectured at an artist and mathematics convention in Stockholm on symmetry in 2000. Beyer was invited to teach at an Australian quilt seminar from 2010 to 2015 and in Ukraine for three years. She also appeared on internet and HGTV television programs to share her methodology and her color and designs to a wider audience.

== Personal life ==
She was married to John Beyer in 1962 until his death in 2020. The couple had two sons (Sean and Darren) and one daughter (Kiran) from the marriage. Beyer is an avid gardener, plays the sitar, takes parts in debates, and took up running at the age of 40.

== Impact ==
Encyclopædia Britannica and RJR Fabrics credited her for being one of the first designers to form a fabric collection suited to the needs of quilters. Beyer uses high-technology computer programs to produce new designs, and used color shading techniques; she told her students to eschew this method in favor by doing their designs by hand as much as possible. She was inspired by Indian designs and fabric.

She was inducted into the Quilters Hall of Fame in 1984 to honor her "outstanding contributions to the world of quilting". In 1995, Beyer was made a recipient of the annual Silver Star Award at the International Quilt Festival "to honor a person who is active in the quilt world today, and whose work presents a lasting influence on today's quilting and the future of the art", and the International Quilt Market named her the winner of the Michael Kile Award of Achievement to recognize her "commitment to creativity and excellence in the quilting industry" the following year. Her Ray of Light quilt was selected as one of Quilter's Newsletter's "100 Best American Quilts of the 20th Century" in 1999, and readers of American Quilter's Society magazine named her its "American Quilter" in mid-2004.

== See also ==
- Bonnie Leman
- History of quilting
