= Junkins =

Junkins is a surname. Notable people with the surname include:

- George S. Junkins, American politician from Massachusetts.
- Jerry Junkins (1937–1996), American electronics businessman
- John Junkins (born 1943), American aerospace engineer
- Lowell Junkins (born 1944), American politician from Iowa

== Other ==
- Junkin
