= William Jenkyn Thomas =

Welsh headmaster and author (1870–1959)

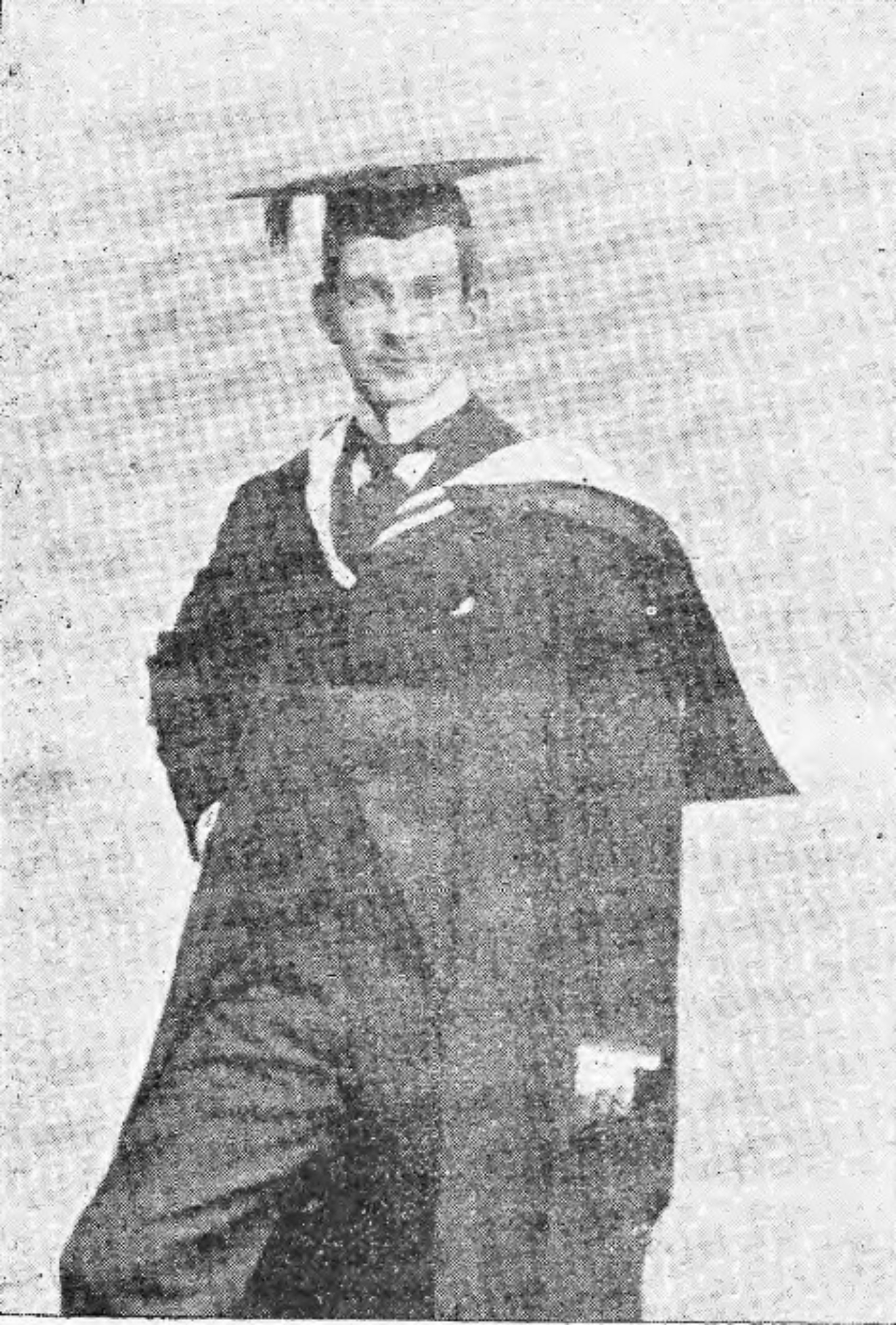
William Jenkyn on academic gown

William Jenkyn Thomas (5 July 1870 – 14 March 1959) was a Welsh headmaster and author best known for his The Welsh Fairy Book. He was an undergraduate student at the University of Cambridge and in addition to his writings worked as a lecturer and teacher. He was the first Head Master at Aberdare Intermediate School (1896-1905) and was headmaster (1905-1935) at Hackney Downs School.

His father, John Thomas, later lived in Cloddia, Llidiardau, Llanycil, on the outskirts of Bala, Merionethshire, and Jenkyn’s family are buried in the Methodist chapel there.

John Thomas (1827-1905) presented evidence totalling 6 pages to the Welsh Land Commission in the Shire Hall, Bala, in September 1893, which Jenkyn helped, in part, to prepare (National Library of Wales letter Papers of Wm George Solicitor NLW MSS (12) 4128). In this, “Siencyn” explains he is teaching Latin to D Lloyd George’s cousin and is returning to Cloddiau to assist his father.

In John Thomas’ oral submission to the commissioners of 1893, he explains that his family were tenants of Sir Watkin Williams-Wynn at Gwernhefyn, Llanycil, [a farm next to Glanllyn at the SW tip of Llyn Tegid or Bala Lake] before the battle of Waterloo.

The family connection is tenuous but present through a great uncle, John Owens (1765-1819) of Pandy Mawr who married John Thomas’ great aunt Elin Jones. John Owen’s father, Evan Owen (1726-1819) and grandfather Owen Robert (fl. 1717-1750) were tenants at Gwernhefyn.

== Selected publications ==
Thomas, W. J. (1894). Penillion telyn, Rhan 1. Caernarfon: Gwymni y Cyhoeddwys Cymreig.

Thomas, W. J. (1870). Cambrensia: A literary reading book for Welsh schools. London: Edward Arnold.

Thomas, W. J. (1907). The Welsh fairy book. London: Fisher Unwin.

Thomas, W. J. (1941). Some Forgotten Welshmen. Trans. Cymmrodorion (1941) 100-114
