= Jenkin Jones =

Jenkin Jones may refer to:

- Jenkin Jones (captain) (1623–?), Welsh captain, Puritan cleric and preacher
- Jenkin Jones (pastor) (1700?–1742), Welsh Arminian pastor and writer
- Jenkin Lloyd Jones (1843–1918), American Unitarian minister
- Jenkin Jones (trade unionist) (1859–1929), Welsh trade unionist
- Jenkin Lloyd Jones Sr. (died 2004), owner and editor of the Tulsa Tribune

== See also ==
- Jenkinjones, West Virginia
