= International Quilt Festival =

Annual conference

The International Quilt Festival is an annual conference in Houston, Texas. The event is the largest annual quilt show in the United States and is Houston's second-most attended annual public show, held in the George R. Brown Convention Center. Spanning four days plus a "preview night," the festival regularly attracts 55,000 people, provides more than 1,000 vendor booths and 550 classes and lectures, and features more than 1,600 quilts and other works of textile art.

== History ==
The festival began as a Quilt Fair organized by Karey Patterson Bresenhan at her antique store Great Expectations in 1975. The Quilt Fair was held at three venues over the following four years. In 1980 it became known as the Quilt Festival and was held at the Shamrock Hilton, which served as the event's venue for six years. In 1987 "International" was added to the name, and the George R. Brown Convention Center was established as the festival's venue.
