= Edwin Jenkyn =

Australian rules footballer

Personal information
- Full name: Edwin Jenkyn
- Born: 18 July 1876; Shepparton, Victoria
- Died: 7 May 1947 (aged 70); Parkville, Victoria
- Original teams: Brighton, Wesley College
- Height: 174 cm (5 ft 9 in)

Playing career^{1}
Years	Club	Games (Goals)
1897	Melbourne	17 (2)
- ^{1} Playing statistics correct to the end of 1897.

Edwin Jenkyn (18 July 1876 – 7 May 1947) was an Australian rules footballer who played with Melbourne in the Victorian Football League (VFL). He served in the First Australian Imperial Force in World War I.
