= Georgia Bonesteel =

American quilter (born 1936)

- Born: Georgia Anne Jinkinson; July 21, 1936 (age 89); Sioux City, Iowa
- Occupation: Quilter
- Known for: Hosting Lap Quilting with Georgia Bonesteel

Georgia Anne Bonesteel (née Jinkinson; born July 21, 1936) is an American quilter. She is the author of several books about quilting, as well as the former host of multiple television programs about quilting, most notably Lap Quilting with Georgia Bonesteel. She has been credited with inventing "lap quilting".

== Early life and career ==
Bonesteel was born Georgia Anne Jinkinson in Sioux City, Iowa, to Earl Jinkinson, a lawyer, and his wife Virginia. She has a sister, Jill Moore. She learned to sew by watching her mother, who sewed in order to save money on clothes. She attended Iowa State University and Northwestern University, receiving a bachelor's degree in home economics from Northwestern. One of her first jobs was working for Marshall Field's designing store window displays. She moved to New Orleans in 1969, by which time she was able to concentrate on sewing, her favorite pastime.

== Quilting career ==
In New Orleans, Bonesteel auditioned for the role of a seamstress on the Terry Flettrich Show, and won, beating 20 other women in doing so. One day, when the show was out of ideas, Bonesteel decided to make a patch quilt out of scrap material, which began her career in quilt making. In 1969, Bonesteel won an audition with Sears & Roebuck to appear on the TV show Sewing is Fun. In 1972, Bonesteel moved to Flat Rock, Henderson County, North Carolina with her family, where she began working at Connemara Farms, part of the Carl Sandburg Home National Historic Site. At Connemara, Bonesteel worked in Sandburg's upstairs workroom. While working there, she got the idea of making a quilt to serve as a backdrop for presentations there.

In 1982, Bonesteel opened a quilt store in the corner of Bonesteel's Hardware and Gifts, a hardware store in Hendersonville, North Carolina run by her husband. In 1985, she was one of five judges at that year's Woodlawn Needlework Exhibition at Woodlawn Plantation. In 2005, with her son Paul, Bonesteel produced the documentary The Great American Quilt Revival. She has served as president of the International Quilt Association and was the founding president of the Western North Carolina Quilters Guild.

=== Television career ===
In 1978, Bonesteel first approached UNC-TV with the idea for Lap Quilting with Georgia Bonesteel. The first six segments of the show first aired in 1980. Although they were not widely viewed at first, these segments were so well-received that another seven segments were later taped, and the show aired on public television across the country. In total, Bonesteel has hosted various television programs about quilting for 27 years.

=== Teaching ===
Bonesteel began teaching at Blue Ridge Community College after a neighbor asked her to take over a sewing class there when she first moved to North Carolina in 1972. She has also taught at the John C. Campbell Folk School in Brasstown since 1995.

=== Honors and awards ===
In 1993, Bonesteel was named honorary chairwoman of the Mary Barton Collection in Des Moines, Iowa. In 2001, she received the Silver Star Salute at Quilt Festival. In 2002, she received the Bernina Leadership Award. In 2003, she was inducted into the Quilters Hall of Fame. In 2015, she was named a "Quilting Legend" by TheQuiltShow.com, which also released a four-part video series about her.

== Personal life ==
Bonesteel met her husband, Peter Bonesteel, while living in the northern suburbs of Chicago working at Marshall Field's. The two celebrated their 49th wedding anniversary in 2008. As of 2008, they have three children and eight grandchildren. As of 2014, she keeps chickens at her house, and is a member of the Hendersonville Hen Society. She remained married to Peter Bonesteel until his death in 2024.
