= Martin Jenkin =

English cricketer (born 1975)

Martin Jenkin (born 1 March 1975) was an English cricketer who was born in Redruth, and was a left-handed batsman who played for Cornwall.

== Playing career ==
Jenkin made a single List A appearance for the side during the C&G Trophy in August 2002, against Somerset Cricket Board. From the lower-middle order, he scored 6 runs with the bat. He took figures of 2-44 from seven overs with the ball.

Jenkin played for Hayle in the Cornwall Cricket League in 2007.
