= Sarah Bowie =

Irish illustrator, writer and cartoonist

- Born: Sarah Bowie; Ireland
- Occupation: Illustrator
- Website: sarahbowie.com

Sarah Bowie is an Irish illustrator, author and cartoonist.

== Life and career ==
Bowie lives in Waterford. She was a founder member of The Comics Lab.

Although she got a degree in marketing and languages in 1999, she has gone on to become a visual artist. Her art has appeared in a range of books, comics and magazines including cover illustrations such as an issue of the Dublin Inquirer.

She has supported comics creators in producing their published work. She published her first picture book in 2016. Bowie worked as a Visual Analyst for a design thinking company. She organised the first indie Irish-French Comics Festival. Bowie completed a three-month residency in Angouleme. She has published several children's books. She has been interviewed in various media outlets about her journey to illustration. Bowie also does workshops with children. She is founder of the weekly meetup group Waterford Sketchers.

== Personal life ==
Bowie recently spoke to the Irish Examiner about a previous health issue.

== Bibliography ==
- A Clock or a Crown (Little Island – 2015)
- BUZZ 2 (Oonagh Young Gallery – 2015)
- Ruaille Buaille (Coimici Gael – 2015)
- Let's See Ireland (O'Brien Press – 2016)
- We're Going to the Zoo! (O'Brien Press – 2018)
- Kevin's in a Mood (O' Brien Press - 2023)
- Nina Peanut: Is Amazing (Scholastic - 2024) (known as Nina Peanut: Creative Genius in the United States)
- Nina Peanut: Mega Mystery Solver (Scholastic - 2024) (known as Nina Peanut and the Mystery of the Ghost Shoe in the United States)
- Nina Peanut: Epic World Tour Era (Scholastic - 2025)
