= Alan Jenkin =

Australian rules footballer

Personal information
- Full name: Alan Jenkin
- Born: 10 December 1962 (age 63)
- Original team: North Ballarat
- Height: 173 cm (5 ft 8 in)
- Weight: 75 kg (165 lb)

Playing career^{1}
Years	Club	Games (Goals)
1984	St Kilda	6 (4)
- ^{1} Playing statistics correct to the end of 1984.

Alan Jenkin (born 10 December 1962) is a former Australian rules footballer who played for the St Kilda Football Club in the Victorian Football League (VFL).
