= Bonnie Leman =

American magazine publisher (1926–2010)

- Born: Bonnie Lee Hale; September 28, 1926 Purdin, Missouri
- Died: September 4, 2010 (aged 83) Arvada, Colorado
- Occupation: Writer; journalist; editor; publisher; quilt historian
- Language: English
- Education: Park University, 1947; University of Denver
- Genre: non-fiction; crafts; history
- Subject: Quilting
- Years active: 1969–1996
- Notable awards: Quilters Hall of Fame; 1982
- Spouse: George Leman
- Children: 7
- Relatives: Roy Hale (brother)

Bonnie Lee Hale Leman (September 28, 1926 — September 4, 2010) was the founder of Quilter's Newsletter Magazine, the first quilting-focused magazine in the United States. She was one of the first women magazine publishers in the country and was inducted into the Quilters Hall of Fame in 1982.

== Early life and education ==
She was born September 28, 1926, in Purdin, Missouri. Her parents were Rex and Laura Hale, and she had one brother, Roy. As a child, she was considered a good student and athlete.

Bonnie Leman left home at the age of 16 to attend Park University. She graduated in 1947, at the age of 19, earning a degree in home economics with a minor in English. After graduating, she taught English and home economics to junior high students in Shannon City, Iowa and Abilene, Kansas, and received a teaching certificate while working. However, she found she did not enjoy her second teaching post, so she moved to Denver, Colorado with her brother. There, she worked as a waitress, then taught herself shorthand from a book at the Denver Public Library so that she could work as a secretary, and worked her way up to a production manager position at an electrical manufacturing company. She then moved to Washington, D.C. and worked as a secretary at the National Academy of Sciences before moving back to Denver to be nearer to her parents.

She then began pursuing a teaching degree at the University of Denver. In 1954, she met George Leman in the teaching master's program there, and they were married later that same year.

== Quilter's Newsletter Magazine ==
In 1968, the Lemans started a mail-order business selling quilting templates, so that Bonnie could stay home with their children while also earning income to supplement George's teacher's salary. The templates they sold were reproduced from the collection of Kansas City Star quilt patterns that Bonnie inherited from her mother after she died. After her mother's death, she discovered that her family had a history of quilting, and she became very interested in the craft.

The first edition of Quilter's Newsletter was published by the Sentinel on September 21, 1969. Leman composed all 5,000 copies of the first issue on her manual typewriter.

Through the magazine, she helped revive and foster an appreciation of quilting as an active and modern art form, while informing readers of quilting history. The publication is credited for kickstarting the North American quilt revival in the 1970s, around the time of the United States Bicentennial. Quilter's Newsletter was an important platform for contemporary quilters, such as Mary Alice Barton, Jinny Beyer, Sue Reno, and Grace Snyder, and helped quilters connect and build organizations such as the Women of Color Quilters Network. It garnered international praise and had a readership of more than 200,000 subscribers in over 100 countries.

Writers for the magazine included Cuesta Benberry, Barbara Brackman, and Jennifer Chiaverini.

The magazine ceased publication in late 2016, citing economic reasons caused by a changing market.

== Other work ==
In addition to her work on the magazine, Leman was also a freelance writer. She wrote and published books and other publications on the subject of quilt making. She traveled much of the world in the course of her career, and contributed to the growth of the quilt making art in many countries.

=== Books ===
- Quick and Easy Quilting (1972), ISBN 082080343X
- Patchwork Sampler Quilt, Intermediate & Advanced Lessons in Patchwork (1979)
- Log Cabin Quilts (1980), ISBN 0960297014
- Taking the Math Out of Making Patchwork Quilts (1981), ISBN 0960297030
- Patchwork Sampler Legacy Quilt: Intermediate and Advanced Lesson in Patchwork (1984), ISBN 0960297073 – co-author
- Hands All Around: Quilts From Many Nations (1987), ISBN 0525245049 – co-author
- Quilts: Visions of the World (1988), LCCN 88-62634 OL 2065683M
- Choice Scrap Quilts (1994), ISBN 0943721148

== Personal life ==
George Leman died in 1986. Bonnie Leman retired in 1996, and her daughter Mary Austin took over running Quilter's Newsletter Magazine as its Editor-in-Chief. Leman died in Arvada, Colorado on September 4, 2010, at the age of 83, and was survived by 7 children.

== See also ==
- History of quilting
- Jinny Beyer
- List of North American pieced quilt patterns
- List of quilters
- Quilt
- Shelly Zegart
