= Marie Webster =

American artist, lecturer, businesswoman, and writer (1859–1956)

- Born: Marie Daugherty; July 19, 1859; Wabash, Indiana, United States
- Died: August 29, 1956 (aged 97); Princeton, New Jersey
- Known for: Quilt designs
- Spouse: George Webster Jr.

Marie Daugherty Webster (July 19, 1859 – August 29, 1956) was a quilt designer, quilt producer, and businesswoman, as well as a lecturer and author of Quilts, Their Story, and How to Make Them (1915), the first American book about the history of quilting, reprinted many times since. She also ran the Practical Patchwork Company, a quilt pattern-making business from her home in Marion, Indiana, for more than thirty years. Webster's appliquéd quilts influenced modern quilting designs of the early twentieth century. Her quilts have been featured in museums and gallery exhibition in the United States and Japan. The Indianapolis Museum of Art holds the largest collection of her quilts in the United States. Webster was inducted into the Quilters Hall of Fame in 1991. The Marie Webster House, her former residence in Marion, Indiana, was listed on the National Register of Historic Places in 1992, was designated a National Historic Landmark in 1993, and serves as the present-day home of the Quilters Hall of Fame.

== Early life and education ==
Marie Daugherty was born on July 19, 1859, in Wabash, Indiana, to Minerva Harriet (Lumaree) and Josiah Scott Daugherty. She was oldest of the family's six children. Her father was an entrepreneur, bank president, and civic leader in Wabash. During her childhood, Daugherty learned the art of fine handsewing from her mother. She was educated in the Wabash public schools, graduating from Union School in Wabash in 1878. Daugherty's parents discouraged her from attending college and she had no formal art training. Although needlework became a favorite pastime of hers, she did not start designing quilts until the age of fifty.

== Marriage and family ==
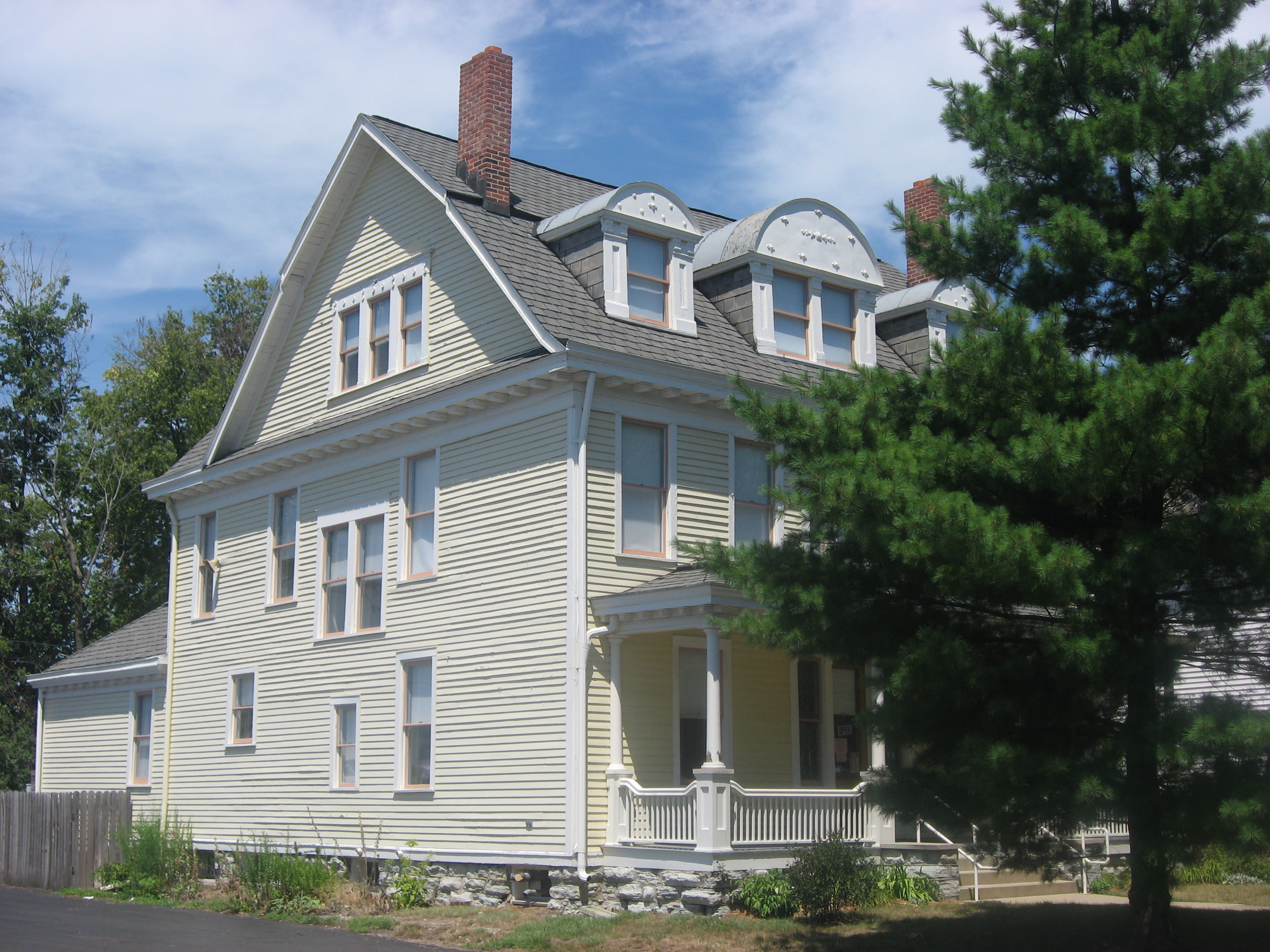
Webster's house in Marion

Marie Daugherty married George Webster Jr. of Marion, Indiana, on Valentine's Day, February 14, 1884. Their only child, a son named Lawrence Burns Webster, was born on October 29, 1884. He became a Harvard-trained mechanical engineer and married Jeannette Scott.

Marie and George Webster established their home in Marion where they spent most of their fifty-four years of married life. Marie was devoted to her family, active in social and volunteer projects, and enjoyed reading, sewing, and amateur theater, while George became a banker and was active in civic affairs, including service on Wabash's school and library boards. The couple built a Colonial Revival-style home in Marion in 1902.

The couple also traveled in the United States and in Europe until George's severe rheumatoid arthritis forced his retirement from the bank around 1910 and ended their travels. Around 1909 Marie took up quilting while caring for her ailing husband. George Webster died in 1938.

After her husband's death, Webster and her sister, Emma Daugherty, stayed in the Webster home in Marion. The Websters' son, Lawrence, and his family lived nearby. In 1942, Webster and her sister relocated to Princeton, New Jersey, to join Lawrence Webster and his family.

== Career ==
=== Early quilt designs ===
In 1909 at the age of fifty, Webster made her first appliquéd quilt of her own design, adapted from the traditional "Rose of Sharon" pattern using shaped pieces cut from colored fabrics and sewn to a background fabric. Webster's friends encouraged her to send the quilt to the Ladies Home Journal, whose editor asked her to provide additional samples of her work. In its January 1911 issue, the magazine featured for the first time using full-color pages, four of Webster's quilt designs ("Pink Rose," "Iris," "Snowflake," and "Wind-blown Tulip") which were stylized designs inspired by her garden flowers. More of her appliquéd quilts were published as full-color features in the Ladies' Home Journal issues for August 1911, January 1912, and August 1912. (Note: Webster's quilts featured in the January 1912 issue of the Ladies' Home Journal included "Poppy," "Morning Glory," "White Dogwood," and "Sunflower" designs. The August 1912 issue featured her baby quilt designs: "Pansies and Butterflies," "Sunbonnet Lassies" (also known as "Keepsake"), "Daisies," "Wild Rose," "Morning Glory Wreath," and "Bedtime." See: Imami-Paydar, "Marie Webster Quilts" in American Quilt Renaissance.) The Journal also asked her to write articles about quilts using her name as a byline, leading the way for other professional women quilters to use their own names in association with their work. Webster had subsequent quilt designs published in other women's magazines. In addition, her quilts were displayed in 1911 at Marshall Field's galleries in Chicago, Illinois.

Exposure to her quilt designs in the Ladies' Home Journal, with a circulation at that time of about 1.5 million readers, brought Webster and her quilts national recognition. As her quilt designs became well known, requests for her patterns also increased. With her son, Lawrence, making the blueprints for her patterns and her sister, Emma Daugherty, helping make the full-size, tissue-paper patterns, Webster created kits to keep up with the demand. The kits initially sold for fifty cents each and included instructions, pattern templates, and a picture of the completed quilt.

=== Quilt book ===
In 1912, Doubleday, Page, and Company invited Webster to research and write a book about the history of quilting and pattern names. Quilts, Their Story and How to Make Them, published in October 1915, was the first full-length quilting history published in America, and it was reprinted multiple times. (Note: Quilts, Their Story and How to Make Them was reprinted in 1916, 1926, 1928, 1929, 1943, 1948, and in 2009. See: Marie Daugherty Webster (January 2, 2009). Quilts: Their Story and How to Make Them. Dodo Press. p. 180. ISBN 978-1-4099-1131-9.) Webster took a broad view of the subject in her book, tracing its origins in Egypt, Asia, Africa, the Middle East, and the Renaissance. She also included chapters on quilting techniques and quilt collections, and concluded with a list of more than 400 quilt pattern names. Although her quilting history was not footnoted, it was based on earlier reference sources and included a list of references she consulted. Webster's extensively researched book received favorable reviews from The New York Times, the Chicago Tribune, The Christian Science Monitor, and the Boston Herald. A February 1916 review of her book in Gustav Stickley's The Craftsman magazine called it "thoroughly delightful" and said, "little has been left unsaid in this book on the pleasant matter of patchwork making". Webster's book brought her national and international recognition as a quilt designer and quiltmaker and increased the popularity of her designs among quilters. Her notoriety lead to additional publicity about her work, invitations to lecture, and offers to publish more of her designs.

=== Entrepreneur ===
The mail-order business operating out of Webster's home expanded after her quilt book was published in 1915, increasing the requests for her quilt patterns. Around 1921, the popularity of Webster's appliqué quilt designs led her to form The Practical Patchwork Company with two friends, Ida Hess and Evangeline Beshore, and her sister, Emma Daugherty. Webster operated the mail-order business out of her home with her cofounders and the additional assistance of her family members. The company, whose motto was "A Thing of Beauty Is a Joy Forever," specialized in selling her original designs in kits that included packaged patterns, instruction sheets, and precut fabric quilting pieces. It also marketed Webster-designed, partially completed quilts and shipped them throughout the United States. The company promoted its offerings in its published catalogs (the initial four-page catalog was entitled The New Patch-work Patterns), through advertising in periodicals, such as House Beautiful, and through occasional sales to retail shops. Webster created the designs, she or others in the business appliquéd the pieces, and other quilters were contracted to do the quilting. By 1930 the company's catalog included thirty-three of her designs.

=== Influences and inspiration ===
Webster designed dozens of quilts and became a leader of the early twentieth century quilting revival. Webster's designs rejected the bright colors and heavily embroidered "Crazy Quilt" patterns of the late nineteenth century in favor of the simple, appliquéd quilts that were popular in the mid-nineteenth century. The Arts and Crafts Movement of the early 1900s also influenced her simple, handmade appliquéd quilts. The hallmarks of her work have been characterized as "balance, harmony, restrain, elegance, and above all, simplification."

Webster frequently used a palette of soft, muted pastels and modern designs that were less elaborate and more realistic, as opposed to the stylized forms and bright colors of the late Victorian era. Her appliqué quilt patterns became especially known for their beautiful, mostly floral designs, done in pastel colors. These qualities also made her designs unusual for that time. Her quilt motifs were typically inspired from nature, especially flowers from her garden, with popular pattern such as "Iris," "Poppy," "Daisies," "Sunflower," "Poinsetta," "Morning Glory," "Pink Rose," and "Grapes and Vines." Webster's modern quilting designs and her patterns, published in women's magazines and in advertisements for her mail-order quilting business, inspired adaptations from other quilt designers, patternmakers, and quilt producers, although they did not always attribute her for the original design idea.

== Later years ==
During the 1920s and 1930s, Webster wrote articles for periodicals; however, she did not create any new designs for a time after her husband died in 1938, and friends and associates ran the business. When she was about seventy years of age, two of her quilts were featured in Needlecraft, a home arts magazine. Webster and her associates continued to operate the Practical Patchwork Company from her home in Marion, Indiana, until she retired at the age of eighty-three in 1942. Webster and her sister, Emma Daugherty, left the mail-order business in Indiana to join her son and his family after they moved to Princeton, New Jersey.

== Death and legacy ==
After suffering a stroke from which she never fully recovered, Webster died in Princeton, New Jersey, on August 29, 1956, at the age of ninety-seven.

She is remembered as a pioneer in the design, production, marketing, and selling of quilt patterns, as well as a quilt lecturer and author of Quilts: Their Story and How to Make Them, America's first full-length book on the history of quilts. Webster also ran a quilt pattern-making business from her home in Wabash, Indiana, for more than thirty years. Several sources recognize the influence that Webster's appliquéd quilts had on quilting designs of the twentieth century.

Webster was inducted into the Quilters Hall of Fame in 1991. Her former residence on South Washington Street in Marion, Indiana, where she lived from 1902 to 1942, it the present-day home of the Quilters Hall of Fame. Also referred to as the Marie Webster House, it was listed on the National Register of Historic Places in 1992 and designated a National Historic Landmark in 1993.

Webster's quilts have been featured in museums and galleries in the United States and in Japan, beginning with an exhibition at Marshall Field's galleries in Chicago, Illinois, in 1911. "Marie Webster Quilts: A Retrospective," a traveling exhibition, was shown in the 1990s at the Indianapolis Museum of Art; the American Museum of Quilts and Textiles in San Jose, California; the Museum of American Folk Art in New York City; the Spencer Museum of Art in Lawrence, Kansas; and in 2000 at the IMA-Columbus Gallery in Columbus, Indiana. Twenty-four Webster-designed quilts, along with others created by quilt designers Rose Kretsinger and Carrie Hall, were featured in the "American Applique Quilt" exhibition in 1998 in galleries and museums throughout Japan, including in Tokyo. Webster's work was also shown in other exhibitions, including those at the Bard Graduate School of Design in New York City in 2000–01, the Indianapolis Museum of Art in 2001, and at the Indiana Historical Society in Indianapolis in 2001–02. The Indianapolis Museum of Art holds the largest collection of her quilts in the United States.

== Published works ==
- Quilts, Their Story, and How to Make Them (Doubleday, 1915) (Note: Webster's book, the first book published in America about the history of quilting, has been reprinted many times, including an illustrated edition, published in 2009. The book was re-published by Rosalind Webster Perry, one of her granddaughters. The 1990 edition includes a biography of Marie Webster, additional color photos, notes and a bibliography. See: Marie Daugherty Webster (January 2, 2009). Quilts: Their Story and How to Make Them. Dodo Press. p. 180. ISBN 978-1-4099-1131-9. Also: Marie Daugherty Webster (January 2, 1990). Quilts: Their Story and How to Make Them. Practical Patchwork. p. 248. ISBN 0-9620811-5-9.)
