= Millersburg, Illinois =

- Census-designated place
- Location within Illinois Location within the United States
- Coordinates: 41°14′25″N 90°49′07″W
- Country: United States
- State: Illinois
- County: Mercer
- Township: Millersburg

Area
  - Total: 0.30 sq mi (0.77 km^{2})
  - Land: 0.30 sq mi (0.77 km^{2})
  - Water: 0 sq mi (0.00 km^{2})
- Elevation: 742 ft (226 m)

Population (2020)
  - Total: 54
  - Density: 182/sq mi (70.2/km^{2})
- Time zone: UTC-6 (Central (CST))
  - Summer (DST): UTC-5 (CDT)
- ZIP Codes: 61260 (Joy); 61231 (Aledo)
- Area code: 309
- GNIS feature ID: 2806527

Millersburg is an unincorporated community and census-designated place in Millersburg Township, Mercer County, Illinois, United States. As of the 2020 census, it had a population of 54. Millersburg is 4.5 miles (7.2 km) northwest of Aledo.

== Demographics ==
Historical population
Census	Pop.	Note	%±
2020	54		—
U.S. Decennial Census

Millersburg first appeared as a census designated place in the 2020 United States census.

== Notable person ==
- Dora Doxey, tried for murder in 1910 and found not guilty.
