= Jenkin Thompson =

Recipient of the George Cross

Jenkin Robert Oswald Thompson GC
- Born: 13 July 1911; Fulham, London
- Died: 24 January 1944 (aged 32) off Anzio, Italy
- Military career
- Allegiance: United Kingdom
- Branch: British Army
- Service years: 1940–1944
- Rank: Captain
- Service number: 115213
- Units: Royal Army Medical Corps; HM Hospital Carrier SS St. David
- Conflicts: World War II: French and Low Countries campaign; Battle of France; Dunkirk evacuation; Italian campaign; Allied invasion of Sicily; Allied invasion of Italy; Battle of Salerno; Battle of Anzio †
- Awards: George Cross

Captain Jenkin Robert Oswald Thompson GC (13 July 1911 – 24 January 1944) was posthumously awarded the George Cross for conspicuous gallantry and devotion to duty. He was awarded the decoration for the courage he showed while serving as a captain in the Royal Army Medical Corps on board HM Hospital Carriers Paris and St. David in Sicily and Anzio.

== George Cross ==
Thompson was awarded a posthumous George Cross for his duty from May 1940 to January 1944. This was while he was serving as a captain in the Royal Army Medical Corps on board the HM Hospital Carriers Paris (at Dunkirk in May 1940); and the HM Hospital Carriers St. David (at Sicily from 10 to 14 July 1943; at Salerno from 10 to 15 September 1943; and at Anzio during 23/24 January 1944).

On all these occasions, despite repeated dive-bombing attacks and enemy shell-fire, he showed indifference to danger and physical exhaustion in the care of his patients. On the night of 24 January 1944 as the St. David sailed out from Anzio, he displayed outstanding heroism when the ship was sinking rapidly as the result of a direct hit from a Luftwaffe dive-bomber.

Captain Thompson organised parties to carry the seriously wounded to safety in the boats and by his courage and coolness was instrumental in saving the lives of all the patients in his ward, except one, as well as those of many walking cases from other wards. Finally, when the ship was about to founder and all were ordered to save themselves, he returned alone to almost certain death in an endeavour to save the one remaining patient who was still lying trapped below decks. He went down with the ship.

== George Cross citation ==
His citation was published in the London Gazette on 2 February 1945.

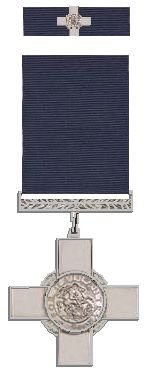
George Cross and its ribbon bar

The King has been graciously pleased to approve the posthumous award of the George Cross, in recognition of most conspicuous gallantry in carrying out hazardous work in a very brave manner, to:-Captain Jenkin Robert Oswald Thompson (115213), Royal Army Medical Corps (Claygate, Surrey).

— London Gazette
