= Anderson Park, Invercargill =

Park in Invercargill, New Zealand

Coordinates: 46.3618°S 168.3597°E

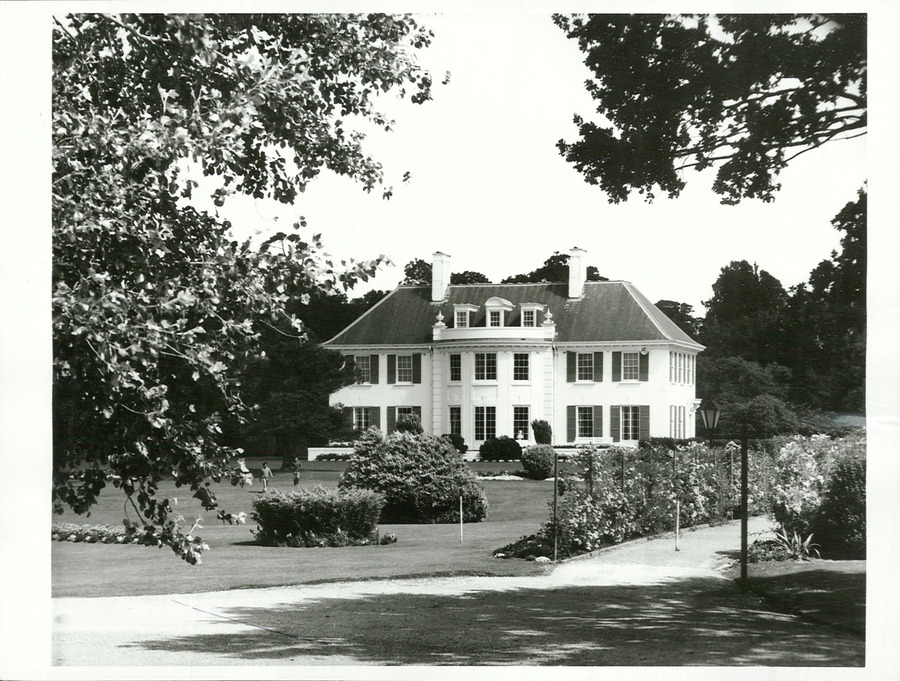
Anderson Park. Invercargill City Art Gallery

Anderson Park is a park in Invercargill, New Zealand. It consists of a Georgian-style residence set in 24 hectares of landscaped gardens. The house displays Invercargill's extensive collection of New Zealand art.

== History ==
Sir Robert Anderson, a notable Invercargill businessman, built the house and it was completed in 1925. The house was designed by Cecil Wood, a Christchurch-based architect. Interior walls were of white plaster to show Sir Robert's paintings and etchings to best advantage. To the rear of the house stands a wharepuni or Māori house known as Te Wharepuni o Anehana, the traditional carving coming from Rotorua.

After the deaths of Sir Robert (1942) and his wife (1951), the house and grounds were given to the city of Invercargill. From 1951 the house has been used to display Invercargill's collection of art. The collection is extensive, with a number of early European works but largely focusing on notable New Zealand and local art. The collection is managed by an incorporated society. Exhibitions from the permanent collection and notable artists were held regularly until it was closed on 30 January 2014 due to earthquake risk. It was re-opened on 12 November 2022 after 1.5 million dollars of renovations.
