= David Stewart Jenkinson =

British soil scientist

David Stewart Jenkinson FRS (25 February 1928 – 16 February 2011) was a soil scientist whose career was based at Rothamsted Research, Harpenden, UK. His first role in soil science was a three-year assistant lectureship in the Department of Agricultural Chemistry at the University of Reading. His research at Rothamsted included the development of a method to measure the organic carbon content of soil microorganisms, the development of a computer model for soil organic carbon turnover ('Rothamsted Carbon Model'), and work with nitrogen-15 isotope for investigating the efficiency of nitrogen fertilizer. He was elected Fellow of the Royal Society in 1991, and was made an Honorary Member of the Soil Science Society of America in 1995.
