= Earl Jinkinson =

American lawyer

Earl Alfred Jinkinson
- Born: September 26, 1905
- Died: November 30, 1995 (aged 90); Tryon, North Carolina, U.S.
- Education: Stetson University
- Occupation: Antitrust lawyer
- Employer: Winston & Strawn
- Known for: Chief of the Antitrust Division, U.S. Department of Justice (Chicago division)
- Spouse: Virginia Jinkinson (née Watson)
- Children: Georgia Bonesteel, Jill Moore

Earl Alfred Jinkinson (September 26, 1905 – November 30, 1995 in Tryon, North Carolina) was an American antitrust lawyer.

== Biography ==
Jinkinson received his law degree from Stetson University, after which he became an FBI agent in 1941. He worked for the United States Department of Justice (DOJ) as chief of their antitrust division in Jacksonville, Florida from 1948 to 1952, whereupon he began working at their Chicago division. He later became the chief of this anti-trust division. While in charge of the DOJ's Chicago antitrust office, he led cases against Seeburg Corporation and the Kansas City Star. He later joined Winston & Strawn, where he went on to become a senior partner. While there, he handled antitrust cases including one involving the Milwaukee Braves, in which he served as lead counsel. He retired from Winston & Strawn in 1988.

=== Personal life ===
Jinkinson was married to Virginia Jinkinson (née Watson) until his death in 1995. They had two daughters: Georgia Bonesteel and Jill Moore.
