= Thomas Jenkinson (footballer, born 1877) =

English footballer

Personal information
- Full name: Thomas Iddo Jenkinson
- Date of birth: 1877
- Place of birth: Sheffield, England
- Date of death: 1949 (aged 71–72)
- Position: Winger

Senior career*
Years	Team	Apps	(Gls)
1895–1896	Sheffield Heeley		
1896–1897	Gainsborough Trinity	0	(0)
1897–1898	Sheffield United	2	(0)
1898–1901	Grimsby Town	66	(24)
- * Club domestic league appearances and goals

Thomas Iddo Jenkinson (1877–1949) was an English professional footballer who played as a winger.
