= Jenkyns =

Jenkyns is a surname. Notable people with the surname include:

- Andrea Jenkyns (born 1974), British politician
- Caesar Jenkyns (1866–1941), Welsh international footballer
- Henry Jenkyns (1838–1899), English lawyer and parliamentary counsel
- Richard Jenkyns (1782–1854), English academic administrator and dean
- Richard Jenkyns (born 1949), Professor of the Classical Tradition at Oxford University

== See also ==
- The Jenkyns Event, one of the names for the Toarcian extinction event
- Jenkyn
- Jenkins
- Jenkins (surname)
