= Thomas Jenkinson (English footballer) =

English footballer

Personal information
- Place of birth: Bradford, England
- Position: Outside left

Senior career*
Years	Team	Apps	(Gls)
- Wapping
1914–1916	Bradford City	1	(0)
- * Club domestic league appearances and goals

Thomas Jenkinson was an English professional footballer who played as an outside left.

== Career ==
Born in Bradford, Jenkinson signed for Bradford City in April 1914 from Wapping, leaving the club in 1916 to play local football. During his time with Bradford City he made one appearance in the Football League.

== Sources ==
- Frost, Terry (1988). Bradford City A Complete Record 1903-1988. Breedon Books Sport. ISBN 0-907969-38-0.
