= Blue Ridge Community College (North Carolina) =

Public college in Henderson and Transylvania Counties, North Carolina, US

Coordinates: 35.307°N 82.423°W

Founded in 1969, Blue Ridge Community College is a public two-year post-secondary community college with three campuses located in North Carolina's Henderson County and Transylvania County. These locations include the Henderson County Campus in Flat Rock, the healthcare-focused Health Sciences Center in Hendersonville, and the Transylvania County Campus in Brevard. Blue Ridge is one of 58 community colleges of the North Carolina Community College System .

== History ==
According to its college catalog and student handbook, the college was established in May 1969 as Henderson County Technical Institute. At that time, the citizens of Henderson County approved a bond issue and a special tax levy which provided funds for the construction, operation, and maintenance of a physical plant for the school. The institution began operation on December 1, 1969, with the first course offered on January 8, 1970. The first full-time curriculum began on September 14, 1970. On October 12, 1970, the school's board of trustees voted to change the school's name to Blue Ridge Technical Institute. On July 9, 1979, they voted to change the name to Blue Ridge Technical College. Its current name—Blue Ridge Community College—was approved by the board of trustees on September 14, 1987.

Today, Blue Ridge operates on three campuses. The Henderson County Campus along College Drive is a 13-building, 128-acre complex two-and-a-half miles southeast of Hendersonville, North Carolina. Its mailing address is 180 West Campus Drive, Flat Rock, NC 28731. The Transylvania County Campus, completed in 2008, occupies two large facilities on nine acres off Oak Park Drive in Brevard. The mailing address of this campus is 45 Oak Park Drive, Brevard, NC 28742. The third location is the Health Sciences Center located in downtown Hendersonville. Blue Ridge shares this facility with UNC Health Pardee and Wingate University, and the mailing address of this campus is 805 6th Avenue West, Hendersonville, NC 28739. offer curriculum and continuing education classes.

== Academics ==
Blue Ridge Community College is accredited by the Commission on Colleges of the Southern Association of Colleges and Schools (SACS) to award the Associate in Arts degree (A.A.), the Associate in Science degree (A.S.), the Associate in Fine Arts degree (A.F.A.), the Associate in General Education degree (A.G.E.), and the Associate in Applied Science degree (A.A.Sc.). The college is an accredited member of the North Carolina Community College System and all its programs have been approved by the North Carolina State Board of Community Colleges. Private support of the college comes from the Blue Ridge Community College Educational Foundation, Inc., founded in 1974.
