= Thomas Jenkinson (MP) =

16th-century English politician

Thomas Jenkinson (by 1527 – 1554 or later) was an English politician.

He was a member (MP) of the parliament of England for Leicester in April 1554.
