= William Jenkinson (footballer, born 1883) =

English footballer

Personal information
- Full name: William Jenkinson
- Date of birth: 1883
- Place of birth: Wombwell, England
- Position: Half-back

Senior career*
| Years | Team | Apps | (Gls) |
| 1900–1901 | Wombwell Town | | |
| 1901–1911 | Gainsborough Trinity | 280 | (14) |
| Total | | 280 | (14) |
- * Club domestic league appearances and goals

William Jenkinson (born 1883) was an English footballer who played in the Football League for Gainsborough Trinity.
