= Grace Snyder =

American quilter, settler, and centenarian (1882–1982)

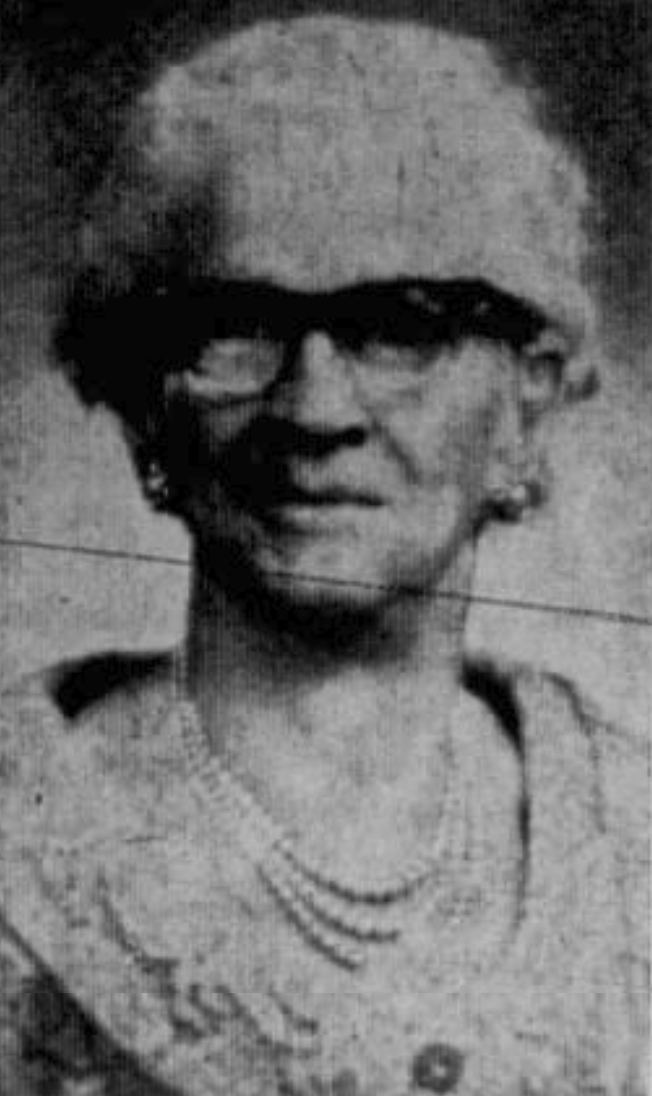
- Snyder in 1963
- Born: April 23, 1882; Cass County, Missouri, US
- Died: December 8, 1982 (aged 100); North Platte, Nebraska, US
- Spouse: Albert Benton Snyder (m. 1903)

Grace Bell McCance Snyder (April 23, 1882 – December 8, 1982), was an American quilter, pioneer and centenarian, whose story is known through the books No Time on My Hands and Pioneer Girl: Growing Up on the Prairie.

== Childhood ==
Born Grace McCance in 1882, she moved to Nebraska with her parents in 1885 to homestead in a sod house in Custer County, which her father acquired through the Homestead Act. She had nine siblings. She had three childhood dreams: to create the most beautiful quilts, to look down from a cloud, and to marry a cowboy. As a small child, she pieced quilt blocks while tending the family's cows. It would be years before she made a quilt from purchased fabric instead of scraps.

== Adulthood ==
Snyder grew up in Nebraska Sand Hills, where she first met her future husband, Bert Snyder, at 17, when he offered to help her family when her father fell ill. She met Bert again at 21, and they married in 1903 and spent 53 years together before his death.

They lived on a ranch forty miles (64 km) northwest of North Platte, where they raised four children: Nellie Snyder Yost, Miles, Billie, and Bertie.

The relatively isolated ranch life gave Snyder time for quilting—she kept a box of quilting supplies with her as she drove around the ranch. But her move to Oregon in 1927 gave her even more time as her domestic and farming duties changed, allowing more time for her textile work. She became recognized for her quilts as their technical detail had reached a national audience.

During times of poverty in her area, she created the Helping Hand Club, which gave quilts and assistance to those in need.

Snyder was also proficient at crochet, embroidery, and other fabric work.

Snyder lived to be 100 years old. She is buried in North Platte Cemetery in North Platte, Nebraska.

== Career ==
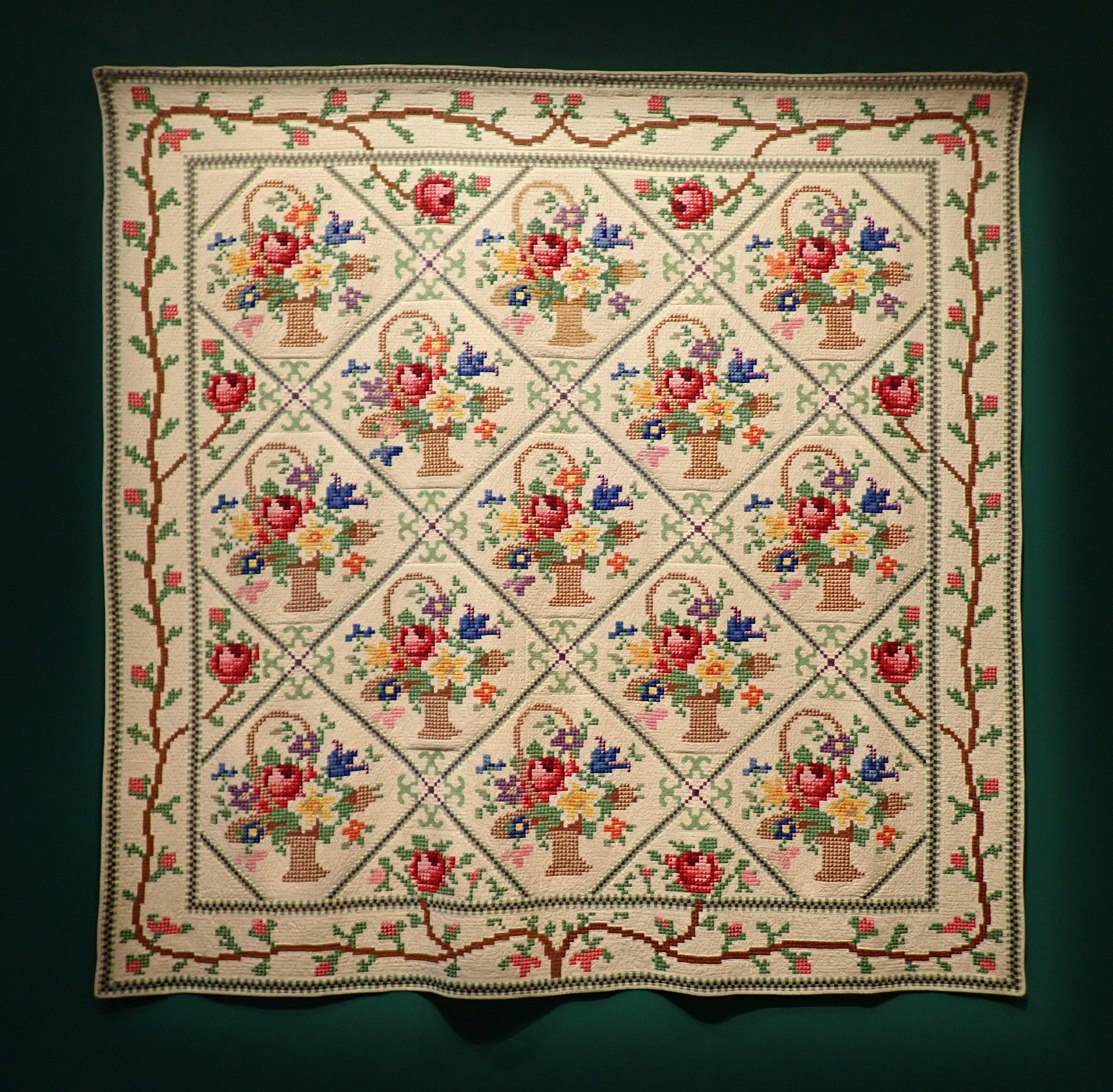
Petit Point Flower Baskets (1943), displayed at the Renwick Gallery in Washington, D.C.

Snyder won many awards and ribbons in local Nebraska quilting competitions. The Women's International Exhibition displayed four of her quilts in 1950.

Although quilt-making became less popular nationwide during the mid 20th century, Snyder continued to produce work throughout her adult life.

The Congress of Quilters Hall of Fame in Arlington, Virginia, inducted her in 1980, as did the Nebraska Quilters Hall of Fame in 1986.

In 1999, when Quilter's Newsletter Magazine commissioned 29 experts to select the hundred best 20th-century American quilts, more than half the jurors included Snyder's Petit Point Flower Baskets in their initial nominations. The quilt is constructed from more than 85,000 fabric pieces.

== Books ==
McCance is remembered by her own memoir No Time On My Hands as told to her daughter Nellie Snyder Yost. Her story is also told in the children's biography Pioneer Girl: Growing Up on the Prairie by Andrea Warren (Morrow Junior Books, 1998).

== Sources ==
- Grace McCance Snyder at www.nebraskapress.unl.edu
- Grace McCance Snyder at andreawarren.com
- Grace McCance Snyder at storytorch.squarespace.com
- Stories of Nebraska Quilters at nequilters.org
