= Jenkins (name) =

- Pronunciation: Jen-kins or Jon-kins

Origin
- Origin: English, Welsh, Dutch, Danish
- Meaning: diminutive of John, "Little John"

Other names
- Variant forms: Jenkin, Jinkins, Jenken, Jankin, Siencyn, Johnson

Jenkins is a surname that originated in Cornwall, but came to be popular in southern Wales. The name "Jenkin" originally meant "little John" or "son of John". The "kin" portion is of Dutch or Danish origin (-kijn), which then gained a certain popularity in England.

== History ==
=== As a forename ===
John, followed by kin/ken meaning "little", gave Jenkin or Jenken. The first use of the name "Jenkins" or "Jenkens" in England occurred as early as 1086 as a diminutive of the English form of John. It was often translated (as a loan word) from Flemish or French as "John the Younger" or seen as "John Jenken", and often referred to as "Little John". Note that while the non-diminutive Jehan (in French) or Jehannes (in Flemish) were also sometimes listed as "John the Elder" in English, they were never translated as "Big John".

In studying early English historical texts, confusion can arise when the father is listed as John, with two sons also named John (the elder) and John (the younger). At that time, it was a direct reference to the name John in the formal and diminutive forms and not associated with birth order. Today, the term "John, Senior" is sometimes used for the father, distinguishing him from "John, Junior" or a numeric designation (e.g., "II").

=== As a surname ===
Jenkins is a surname variant of Jenkin commonly seen in Cornish and in English (mainly Devon) ancestry, also meaning "Little John" or, more literally, "John the Little". Its earliest documented occurrence was in Monmouthshire, in the Domesday Book of 1086, but it almost certainly predates the Norman Conquest.

A common English use, leading to use as a surname, may have been the now-obsolete "little Johns", a 12th-century term for the Cornish (and later Welsh) people, either alluding to their comparatively small stature or, more likely, classing them as illegitimate offspring of the unpopular King John of England, who was previously the Earl of Cornwall and Gloucester.

A Welsh form of the name is Siencyn. "Jenkin" or "Jenkins" and variants should not be construed as shortened forms of "Jenkinson", which denotes "the son of little John."

== Spelling variations ==
Variations of the name Jenkins have included:

- Jankins
- Jenken
- Jenkens
- Jenkin
- Jenkins
- Jenkynn
- Jenkynns
- Jenkyns
- Jenniskens
- Jinkens
- Jinkines
- Jinkins
- Junkin
- Junkins
- Siencyn – a Welsh variation – John is sometimes spelled Zhahn, Sion and Sien

== See also ==
- List of people with surname Jenkins
- Jenkin
- Jenkyns
- Little John
